= 2026 Greek Football Cup final =

2026 Greek Cup final
- Match Poster
- Event: 2025–26 Greek Football Cup
PAOK	OFI
2	3
- After extra time
- Date: 25 April 2026
- Venue: Panthessaliko Stadium, Volos
- Referee: Angelos Evangelou (Athens)
- Attendance: 20,108
- Weather: Fair; 18 °C (64 °F); 55% humidity
- Man of the Match: Aaron Leya Iseka (OFI)

The 2026 Greek Cup final was the 82nd final of the Greek Cup. It took place on 25 April 2026 at Panthessaliko Stadium. The contesting teams were OFI and PAOK. It was OFI's fourth Greek Cup final and second consecutive, in their 101 years of existence and PAOK's twenty fourth Greek Cup final of their 100-year history.

== Venue ==
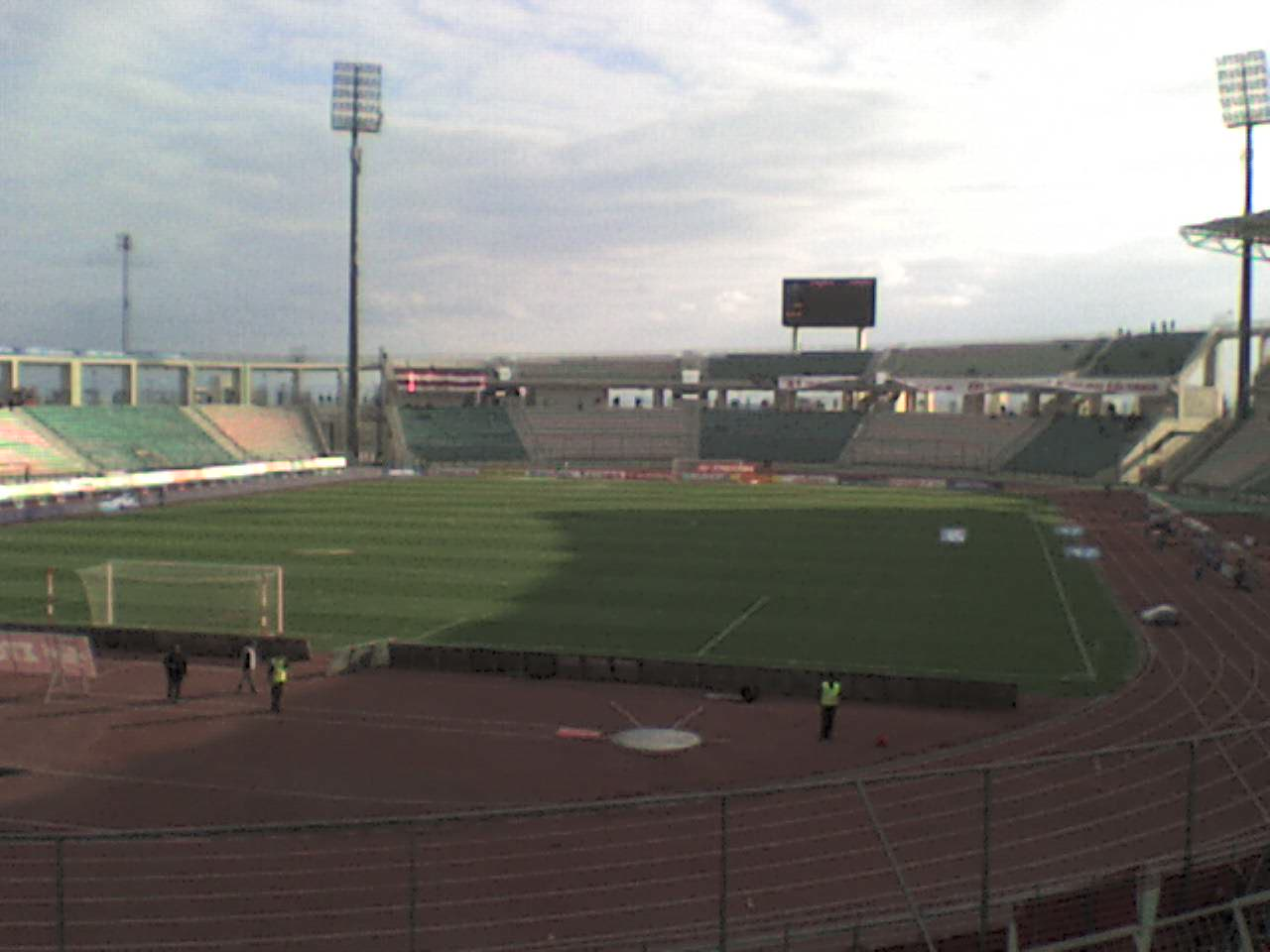
Panthessaliko Stadium.

This was the sixth Greek Cup final held at the Panthessaliko Stadium, after the 2007, 2017, 2020, 2023 and 2024 finals.

Panthessaliko Stadium was built in 2004. The stadium is used as a venue for Niki Volos and Volos. Its current capacity is 22,189.

== Background ==
OFI has reached the Greek Cup final three times, winning one of them. The last time that they had won the Cup was in 1987 (3–1 in penalty shootout against Iraklis). The last time that had played in a final was in 2025, where they had lost to Olympiacos by 2–0.

PAOK has reached the Greek Cup final twenty three times, winning eight of them. The last time that had played in a final was in 2023, where they lost to AEK Athens by 2–0.

The two teams had never met each other in a Cup final.

== Route to the final ==
PAOK				Round	OFI			
Opponent	Result			League phase	Opponent	Result		
Levadiakos	1–4 (A)			Matchday 1	Kavala	3–0 (H)		
AEL	4–1 (H)			Matchday 2	Athens Kallithea	1–0 (A)		
Aris	1–1 (A)			Matchday 3	Iraklis	3–1 (H)		
Marko	4–1 (H)			Matchday 4	AEK Athens	0–2 (A)		
8th place Advanced to knockout phase play-offs				Final position	6th place Advanced to knockout phase play-offs			
Atromitos	1–1 (5–4 p) (H)			Play-offs	Asteras Tripolis	2–0 (H)		
Olympiacos	2–0 (A)			Quarter-finals	AEK Athens	1–0 (A)		
Opponent	Agg.	1st leg	2nd leg		Opponent	Agg.	1st leg	2nd leg
Panathinaikos	3–0	1–0 (A)	2–0 (H)	Semi-finals	Levadiakos	2–1	1–1 (H)	1–0 (A)

== Match ==
=== Details ===
25 April 2026
20:30 EEST

PAOK	2–3 (a.e.t.)	OFI
Kędziora 15'; Jeremejeff 90+7'	Report	Fountas 28'; Nuss 49'; Leya Iseka 105+4'

Panthessaliko Stadium, Volos
Attendance: 20,108
Referee: Angelos Evangelou (Athens)

PAOK	OFI

GK	99	(Greece) Antonis Tsiftsis
RB	3	(England) Jonjoe Kenny
CB	5	(Greece) Giannis Michailidis
CB	15	(Poland) Tomasz Kędziora
LB	21	(Ghana) Baba Rahman
CM	8	(France) Soualiho Meïté		(substituted off) 61'
CM	27	(Russia) Magomed Ozdoyev		(substituted off) 78'
AM	65	(Greece) Giannis Konstantelias	(yellow card) 60'
LW	11	(Brazil) Taison		(substituted off) 61'
RW	14	(Serbia) Andrija Živković (c)		(substituted off) 78'
CF	56	(Greece) Anestis Mythou		(substituted off) 61'
Substitutes:
GK	1	(Czech Republic) Jiří Pavlenka
GK	41	(Greece) Dimitrios Monastirlis
DF	4	(Italy) Alessandro Vogliacco
DF	32	(Scotland) Greg Taylor
DF	35	(Mexico) Jorge Sánchez
MF	2	(Guinea) Mady Camara		(substituted on) 78' (substituted off) 98'
MF	10	(Greece) Dimitris Pelkas		(substituted on) 78'
MF	18	(Croatia) Luka Ivanušec
MF	20	(Greece) Christos Zafeiris		(substituted on) 61'
ΜF	21	(Italy) Alessandro Bianco	(yellow card) 108'	(substituted on) 98'
MF	52	(Greece) Dimitris Chatsidis	(yellow card) 90'	(substituted on) 61'
FW	19	(Sweden) Alexander Jeremejeff		(substituted on) 61'
Manager:
(Romania) Răzvan Lucescu

GK	31	(Greece) Nikos Christogeorgos		(substituted off) 89'
RB	27	(Georgia (country)) Levan Shengelia		(substituted off) 106'
CB	2	(Croatia) Krešimir Krizmanić
CB	15	(Greece) Achilleas Poungouras
CB	5	(Greece) Konstantinos Kostoulas	(yellow card) 89'	(substituted off) 89'
LB	3	(Greece) Nikos Athanasiou
DM	6	(Greece) Zisis Karachalios
CM	14	(Greece) Thanasis Androutsos (c)
RW	11	(Greece) Taxiarchis Fountas		(substituted off) 78'
LW	18	(Argentina) Thiago Nuss	(yellow card) 52'	(substituted off) 77'
CF	9	(Italy) Eddie Salcedo	(yellow card) 86'	(substituted off) 91'
Substitutes:
GK	1	(Albania) Klidman Lilo	(yellow card) 120'	(substituted on) 89'
GK	13	(Greece) Panagiotis Katsikas
DF	4	(Greece) Nikos Marinakis
DF	12	(Greece) Ilias Chatzitheodoridis
DF	24	(Greece) Vasilios Lampropoulos		(substituted on) 106'
DF	90	(Greece) Pavlos Kenourgiakis
MF	7	(Greece) Georgios Kanellopoulos	(yellow card) 93'	(substituted on) 89'
MF	10	(Argentina) Juan Neira
MF	21	(Greece) Giannis Apostolakis		(substituted on) 77'
ΜF	25	(Serbia) Filip Bainović
FW	46	(Greece) Giannis Theodosoulakis		(substituted on) 78'
FW	99	(Belgium) Aaron Leya Iseka	(yellow card) 105+5'	(substituted on) 91'
Manager:
(Greece) Christos Kontis

Man of the Match:
Aaron Leya Iseka (OFI)

Assistant referees:
Andreas Fotopoulos (Athens)
Ioannis Karagizopoulos (Imathia)
Fourth official:
Christos Vergetis (Arcadia)
Video assistant referee:
Anastasios Papapetrou (Athens)
Assistant video assistant referee:
Vasilis Fotias (Pella)

Match rules

- 90 minutes
- 30 minutes of extra time if necessary
- Penalty shoot-out if scores still level
- Nine named substitutes, of which up to five may be used at maximum three times, with a sixth allowed in extra time.
