= 2025 Greek Football Cup final =

2025 Greek Cup final
- Match Poster
- Event: 2024–25 Greek Football Cup
OFI	Olympiacos
0	2
- Date: 17 May 2025
- Venue: Olympic Stadium, Marousi, Athens
- Referee: Szymon Marciniak (Poland)
- Attendance: 55,000
- Weather: Fair; 20 °C (68 °F); 54% humidity
- Man of the Match: Ayoub El Kaabi (Olympiacos)

The 2025 Greek Cup final was the 81st final of the Greek Cup. It took place on 17 May 2025 at the Olympic Stadium. The contesting teams were OFI and Olympiacos. It was OFI's third Greek Cup final in their 100 years of existence and Olympiacos' forty second Greek Cup final of their 100-year history. This was the first final to use semi-automated offside technology and goal-line technology. In social media, the final was branded as #TheCentennials.

== Venue ==
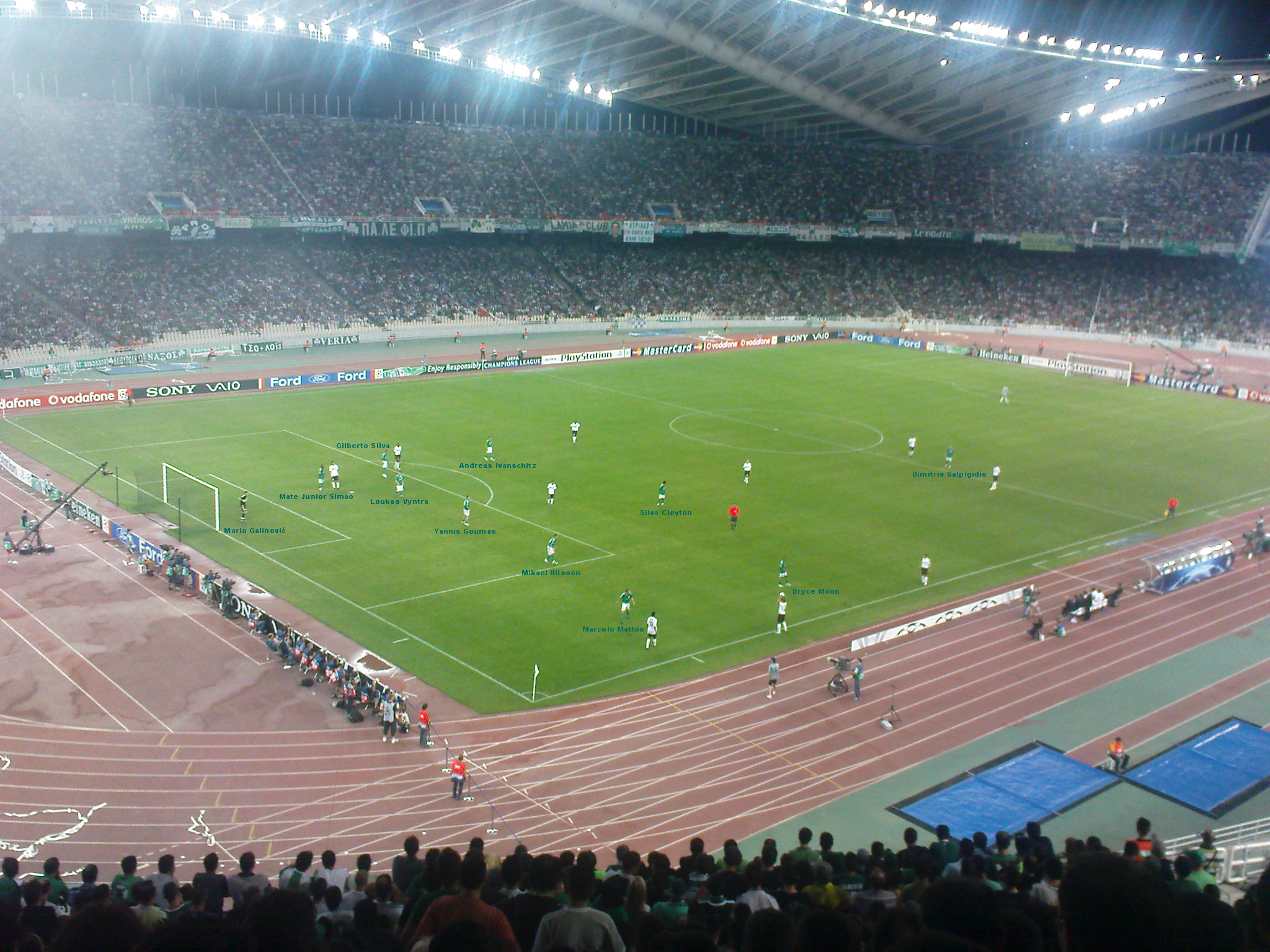
Athens Olympic Stadium.

This was the twenty seventh Greek Cup final held at the Athens Olympic Stadium, after the 1983, 1984, 1985, 1986, 1987, 1988, 1989, 1990, 1993, 1994, 1995, 1996, 1999, 2000, 2002, 2009, 2010, 2011, 2012, 2013, 2014, 2015, 2016, 2018, 2019, 2021 and 2022 finals.

The Athens Olympic Stadium was built in 1982 and renovated once in 2004. The stadium is used as a venue for Panathinaikos and was used for AEK Athens, Olympiacos and Greece and on various occasions. Its current capacity is 69,618 and it hosted three European Cup/UEFA Champions League finals in 1983, 1994 and 2007, a UEFA Cup Winners' Cup final in 1987, the 1991 Mediterranean Games and the 2004 Summer Olympics.

== Background ==
OFI has reached the Greek Cup final two times, winning one of them. The last time that they had won the Cup was in 1987 (3–1 in penalty shootout against Iraklis). The last time that had played in a final was in 1990, where they had lost to Olympiacos by 4–2.

Olympiacos has reached the Greek Cup final forty one times, winning twenty eight of them. The last time that had played in a final was in 2021, where they lost to PAOK by 2–1.

The two teams have met each other in a Cup final once in the 1990 final.

== Route to the final ==
OFI				Round	Olympiacos			
Opponent	Agg.	1st leg	2nd leg		Opponent	Agg.	1st leg	2nd leg
Panetolikos	2–1 (H)			Fourth Round	Bye			
Volos	3–2	3–1 (H)	0–1 (A)	Round of 16	Athens Kallithea	2–1	1–0 (A)	1–1 (H)
Panachaiki	7–1	5–0 (H)	2–1 (A)	Quarter-finals	Panathinaikos	2–1	1–1 (A)	1–0 (H)
Asteras Tripolis	2–1	1–0 (A)	1–1 (H)	Semi-finals	AEK Athens	6–2	6–0 (H)	0–2 (A)

== Match ==
=== Details ===
17 May 2025
20:00 EEST

OFI	0–2	Olympiacos
	Report	El Kaabi 9'; Yaremchuk 90+3'

Olympic Stadium, Marousi
Attendance: 55,000
Referee: Szymon Marciniak (Poland)

OFI	Olympiacos

GK	31	(Greece) Nikos Christogeorgos
RB	17	(Spain) Borja González
CB	24	(Greece) Vasilios Lampropoulos (c)	(yellow card) 81'
CB	30	(Mexico) Jordan Silva	(yellow card) 2'
LB	12	(Greece) Ilias Chatzitheodoridis	(yellow card) 78'	(substituted off) 83'
DM	6	(Greece) Zisis Karachalios		(substituted off) 64'
CM	88	(Montenegro) Marko Bakić		(substituted off) 83'
CM	14	(Greece) Thanasis Androutsos
RW	11	(Greece) Taxiarchis Fountas
LW	18	(Argentina) Thiago Nuss	(yellow card) 68'
CF	9	(Italy) Eddie Salcedo		(substituted off) 83'
Substitutes:
GK	1	(Bulgaria) Daniel Naumov
DF	4	(Greece) Nikos Marinakis
DF	22	(Greece) Giannis Christopoulos
DF	34	(Uruguay) Kevin Lewis		(substituted on) 83'
MF	10	(Argentina) Juan Neira		(substituted on) 83'
ΜF	27	(Georgia (country)) Levan Shengelia		(substituted on) 64'
MF	45	(Greece) Giannis Apostolakis
FW	29	(France) Andrew Jung
FW	46	(Greece) Giannis Theodosoulakis		(substituted on) 83'
Manager:
(Serbia) Milan Rastavac

GK	1	(Greece) Alexandros Paschalakis
RB	20	(Portugal) Costinha		(substituted off) 71'
CB	45	(Greece) Panagiotis Retsos (c)
CB	5	(Italy) Lorenzo Pirola
LB	3	(Argentina) Francisco Ortega		(substituted off) 89'
DM	14	(Spain) Dani García	(yellow card) 21'	(substituted off) 84'
DM	32	(Argentina) Santiago Hezze
RW	23	(Brazil) Rodinei
LW	10	(Portugal) Gelson Martins	(yellow card) 47'
AM	22	(Portugal) Chiquinho
CF	9	(Morocco) Ayoub El Kaabi
Substitutes:
GK	99	(Greece) Alexandros Anagnostopoulos
DF	4	(France) Giulian Biancone
DF	16	(Portugal) David Carmo
DF	70	(Nigeria) Bruno Onyemaechi		(substituted on) 89'
MF	8	(New Zealand) Marko Stamenić
MF	96	(Greece) Christos Mouzakitis		(substituted on) 84'
MF	64	(Greece) Antonis Papakanellos
FW	11	(Norway) Kristoffer Velde
FW	17	(Ukraine) Roman Yaremchuk	(yellow card) 74'	(substituted on) 71'
Manager:
(Spain) José Luis Mendilibar

Man of the Match:
Ayoub El Kaabi (Olympiacos)

Assistant referees:
Listkiewicz Tomasz (Poland)
Kupsik Adam Michal (Poland)
Fourth official:
Ioannis Papadopoulos (Macedonia)
Video assistant referee:
Kwiatkowski Tomasz Andrzej (Poland)
Assistant video assistant referee:
Angelos Evangelou (Athens)
Offside video assistant referee:
Anastasios Papapetrou (Athens)

Match rules

- 90 minutes
- 30 minutes of extra time if necessary
- Penalty shoot-out if scores still level
- Nine named substitutes, of which up to five may be used at maximum three times, with a sixth allowed in extra time.
