= 2026–27 Super League Greece =

91st season of top-tier football league in Greece

Super League 1
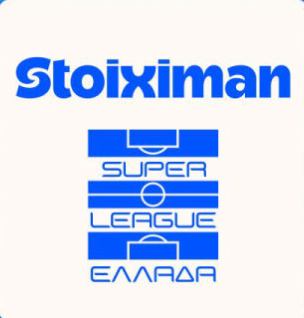
- Season: 2026–27
- Dates: 22 August 2026 – 23 May 2027
- Matches: 69
- Goals: 188 (2.72 per match)
- Top goalscorer: Barnabás Varga (6 goals)
- Biggest home win: AEK Athens 5–0 Aris (5 September 2026); AEK Athens 5–0 Panetolikos (24 October 2026); Olympiacos 5–0 Kalamata (25 October 2026)
- Biggest away win: PAOK 1–3 Kalamata (12 October 2026); Volos 1–3 A.E. Kifisia (7 November 2026)
- Highest scoring: Kalamata 4–3 OFI (18 October 2026)
- Longest winning run: Panathinaikos; Olympiacos (5 matches)
- Longest unbeaten run: AEK Athens (7 matches)
- Longest winless run: Volos (10 matches)
- Longest losing run: Panetolikos (7 matches)
- Highest attendance: 33,113; Olympiacos 1–0 Panathinaikos (11 October 2026)
- Lowest attendance: 475; A.E. Kifisia 0–0 Levadiakos (13 September 2026)
- Total attendance: 401,535
- Average attendance: 8,365
- All statistics correct as of 8 November 2026.

The 2026–27 Super League Greece, also known as Stoiximan Super League for sponsorship reasons, is the 91st season of the Super League Greece, the professional association football league in Greece and the highest level of the Greek football league system under the supervision of the HFF established in 1927. The season also marks the 68th championship since the establishment of the 1st National Division in 1959.

The 2026–27 season began on 22 August 2026. The winter break will begin on 21 December 2026, while the regular season will be concluded on 21 March 2027. The Championship and Europe spot play-offs as well as the Relegation play-outs are expected to begin on 3 April 2027. The league will conclude with the last match day of the Relegation Play-Outs on 23 May 2027.

The draw for the fixtures took place on Thursday 16 July 2026 in Alimos and the full regular season schedule was released shortly after.

AEK Athens are the defending champions having won their 14th title last season.

== Teams ==
Fourteen teams compete in the league – the top twelve teams from the previous season and two teams promoted from Super League 2. Iraklis returns in the Super League, having secured promotion from Super League 2 as north group champions, after a nine-year absence and the 2016–17 season. Kalamata returns in the Super League after twenty five years of absence and the 2000–01 season, after winning the Super League 2 south championship. AEL were relegated to Super League 2 after only one year in the Super League 1. Panserraikos were relegated to Super League 2 for the first time, after 3 consecutive years playing in the top division and the 2023–24 season.

Promoted from 2025–26 Super League Greece 2	Relegated from 2025–26 Super League Greece 1
Iraklis; Kalamata	AEL; Panserraikos

== Format ==
The championship is being held again in two phases, same as last year's, namely the regular season (phase 1) and then the Championship play-offs with the top 4 teams, the play-offs for the UEFA Conference League qualifying rounds between the teams ranked 5 through 8 and the Relegation play-outs round with the bottom 6 teams (phase 2). In the regular season 26 matches will be played in 2 rounds of 13 match days each, where in each round all teams will compete against all others based on a draw.

== Stadiums and locations ==
Locations of the 2026–27 Super League Greece 1 teams

Note: The table is listed in alphabetical order.

Team	Location	Stadium	Capacity	2025–26
AEK Athens	Athens (Nea Filadelfeia)	Agia Sophia Stadium	31,100	1st
A.E. Kifisia	Athens (Ampelokipoi)	Leoforos Alexandras Stadium	16,003	10th
Aris	Thessaloniki (Charilaou)	Kleanthis Vikelidis Stadium	22,800	5th
Asteras Tripolis	Tripoli	Theodoros Kolokotronis Stadium	7,423	11th
Atromitos	Athens (Peristeri)	Peristeri Stadium	9,050	9th
Iraklis	Thessaloniki (Saranta Ekklisies)	Kaftanzoglio Stadium	27,560	Promoted from Super League 2
Kalamata	Kalamata	Kalamata Municipal Stadium	4,496	Promoted from Super League 2
Levadiakos	Livadeia	Levadia Municipal Stadium	5,915	6th
OFI	Heraklion	Pankritio Stadium	26,240	7th
Olympiacos	Piraeus (Neo Faliro)	Karaiskakis Stadium	33,334	2nd
Panathinaikos	Athens (Marousi)	Athens Olympic Stadium	69,618	4th
Panetolikos	Agrinio	Panetolikos Stadium	7,321	12th
PAOK	Thessaloniki (Toumba)	Toumba Stadium	28,703	3rd
Volos	Volos	Panthessaliko Stadium	22,189	8th

=== Personnel, kits and TV channel ===
Team	Manager	Captain	Kit manufacturer	Shirt sponsor (chest)	Shirt sponsor (sleeve)	Broadcast Channel
AEK Athens	(Serbia) Marko Nikolić	(Greece) Petros Mantalos	(United States) Nike	(Greece) Pame Stoixima	N/A	Magenta Sport
A.E. Kifisia	(Argentina) Sebastián Leto	(Portugal) Hugo Sousa	(Germany) Erima	(Greece) Tutu Deals	(Greece) NetBet	Magenta Sport
Aris	(Greece) Michalis Grigoriou	(Serbia) Uroš Račić	(United States) Nike	(Greece) Novibet	(Greece) Zotalease	Nova Sports
Asteras Tripolis	(Portugal) Gonçalo Feio	(Greece) Dimitrios Kourbelis	(United States) Nike	(Greece) Aktor	(Greece) Tutu Deals	Nova Sports
Atromitos	(Bosnia and Herzegovina) Dušan Kerkez	(Greece) Lefteris Choutesiotis	(United States) Capelli	(Greece) Novibet	(Greece) Xmoto	Nova Sports
Iraklis	(Italy) Walter Mazzarri	(Spain) Carles Soria	(Germany) Erima	(Greece) Venetis Bakery	(Greece) HSS Hire Shops	SportFM TV
Kalamata	(Greece) Panagiotis Christofileas	(Greece) Ioannis Gelios	(Italy) Macron	(Greece) Novibet	(Greece) Carhino	Nova Sports
Levadiakos	(Cyprus) Elias Charalambous	(Greece) Panagiotis Liagas	(Italy) Erreà	(Romania) Superbet	(Greece) Avance	Nova Sports
OFI	(Greece) Christos Kontis	(Greece) Thanasis Androutsos	(Germany) Puma	(Sweden) Betsson	(Greece) Zaros	Magenta Sport
Olympiacos	(Spain) Imanol Alguacil	(Greece) Panagiotis Retsos	(Germany) Adidas	(Greece) Stoiximan	(Greece) Shopflix.gr	Magenta Sport
Panathinaikos	(Denmark) Jacob Neestrup	(Netherlands) Stefan de Vrij	(Germany) Adidas	(Romania) Superbet	(Germany) Allianz	SportFM TV
Panetolikos	(Greece) Giorgos Petrakis	(Greece) Charalampos Mavrias	(Italy) Erreà	(Greece) Novibet	(Greece) Avance	Magenta Sport
PAOK	(Italy) Alessio Lisci	(Serbia) Andrija Živković	(Italy) Macron	(Romania) Superbet	N/A	Nova Sports
Volos	(Spain) Juan Carlos Garrido	(Greece) Marios Siampanis	(England) Admiral	(Greece) Elabet	N/A	Magenta Sport

- Puma is the official match ball supplier for a third consecutive year with the PUMA Stellar NITRO™ Ultimate model.
- Adidas is the official uniform supplier of the Referee's Committee of the Hellenic Football Federation.
- Avance is the official sponsor of the Referee's Committee of the Hellenic Football Federation.

=== Managerial changes ===
Team	Outgoing manager	Manner of departure	Date of vacancy	Position in table	Incoming manager	Date of appointment
Kalamata	(Greece) Alekos Vosniadis	End of contract	31 March 2026	Pre-season	(Greece) Panagiotis Christofileas	7 May 2026
Iraklis	(Greece) Giorgos Petrakis	End of contract	12 April 2026	Pre-season	(Italy) Walter Mazzarri	13 May 2026
Panathinaikos	(Spain) Rafael Benítez	Sacked	22 May 2026	Pre-season	(Denmark) Jacob Neestrup	26 May 2026
Levadiakos	(Greece) Nikos Papadopoulos	End of contract	12 June 2026	Pre-season	(Cyprus) Elias Charalambous	24 June 2026
PAOK	(Romania) Răzvan Lucescu	Sacked	19 June 2026	Pre-season	(Italy) Alessio Lisci	22 June 2026
Olympiacos	(Spain) José Luis Mendilibar	Sacked	9 September 2026	3rd	(Spain) Imanol Alguacil	10 September 2026
Volos	(Greece) Kostas Bratsos	Sacked	25 October 2026	14th	(Spain) Juan Carlos Garrido	26 October 2026
Asteras Tripolis	(Greece) Georgios Antonopoulos	Sacked	28 October 2026	11th	(Greece) Giannis Kontoes (caretaker)	29 October 2026
Asteras Tripolis	(Greece) Giannis Kontoes (caretaker)	End of tenure as caretaker	2 November 2026	12th	(Portugal) Gonçalo Feio	2 November 2026
Panetolikos	(Greece) Giannis Anastasiou	Sacked	9 November 2026	10th	(Greece) Giorgos Petrakis	14 November 2026

== League table ==
Pos	Team	Pld	W	D	L	GF	GA	GD	Pts	Qualification or relegation
1	Panathinaikos	10	9	0	1	22	5	+17	27	Qualification for the Championship play-offs
2	AEK Athens	10	7	2	1	24	6	+18	23	Qualification for the Championship play-offs
3	Olympiacos	10	7	2	1	16	5	+11	23	Qualification for the Championship play-offs
4	PAOK	10	6	1	3	19	13	+6	19	Qualification for the Championship play-offs
5	Aris	10	6	1	3	16	17	−1	19	Qualification for the Europe play-offs
6	OFI	10	5	2	3	14	12	+2	17	Qualification for the Europe play-offs
7	A.E. Kifisia	10	4	2	4	15	15	0	14	Qualification for the Europe play-offs
8	Kalamata	11	3	3	5	15	20	−5	12	Qualification for the Europe play-offs
9	Iraklis	10	2	4	4	11	14	−3	10	Qualification for the Relegation play-outs
10	Panetolikos	10	3	0	7	8	20	−12	9	Qualification for the Relegation play-outs
11	Asteras Tripolis	10	1	4	5	9	18	−9	7	Qualification for the Relegation play-outs
12	Atromitos	9	1	3	5	9	12	−3	6	Qualification for the Relegation play-outs
13	Levadiakos	10	1	3	6	4	13	−9	6	Qualification for the Relegation play-outs
14	Volos	10	0	3	7	7	19	−12	0 (Note: Volos were deducted 3 points due to match-fixing in their games v Panserraikos in the Relegation play-outs of the 2024–25 season in order for both to avoid relegation, which resulted in Athens Kallithea being relegated instead.)	Qualification for the Relegation play-outs

Updated to match(es) played on 8 November 2026. Source: Super League Greece
Rules for classification: 1) Points; 2) Head-to-head points; 3) Head-to-head goal difference; 4) Overall goal difference.

== Results ==
Home \ Away	AEK	KIF	ARIS	AST	ATR	IRA	KAL	LEV	OFI	OLY	PAO	PNE	PAOK	VOL
AEK Athens	—		5–0			4–0		2–1	3–0	a	a	5–0	a	
A.E. Kifisia	1–1	—	1–2					0–0		2–3		2–0		
Aris			—		3–1	0–0			2–1			3–0	a	3–2
Asteras Tripolis	1–1			—	2–1	0–2	1–1	0–0		0–1				
Atromitos		1–2			—		1–1						1–2	3–0
Iraklis		2–3			1–1	—		2–0			1–2			
Kalamata	0–1		2–3			1–1	—		4–3		0–1			3–1
Levadiakos			3–0		1–1			—		0–1	0–2	0–2		0–0
OFI		2–0		2–2	0–0				—				2–1	2–0
Olympiacos	a				1–0	6–2	5–0		0–1	—	1–0		1–1	
Panathinaikos	2–0	3–1		5–1					2–0	a	—	3–0	3–1	
Panetolikos				3–1			2–0		0–1	0–2		—	1–3	1–0
PAOK	a	4–0	2–0	2–1		2–1	1–3	4–0		a	a		—	
Volos	1–2	1–3				1–1				1–1	0–1			—

Updated to match(es) played on 8 November 2026. Source: Super League Greece
Legend: Blue = home team win; Yellow = draw; Red = away team win.
For upcoming matches, an "a" indicates there is an article about the rivalry between the two participants.

== Positions by round ==
The table lists the positions of teams after each week of matches. To preserve chronological evolvements, any postponed matches are not included in the round at which they were originally scheduled, but added to the full round they were played immediately afterwards. For example, if a match is scheduled for round 13, but then postponed and played between rounds 16 and 17, it will be added to the standings for round 16. Juridical decisions regarding a match are also added to the full round after which they were ruled.

Team ╲ Round	1	2	3	4	5	6	7	8	9	10	11	12	13	14	15	16	17	18	19	20	21	22	23	24	25	26
Panathinaikos	8	6	1	1	1	1	1	1	1	1	1															
Olympiacos	6	4	4	6	5	3	2	2	2	2																
AEK Athens	1	5	3	5	3	2	4	3	4	3																
PAOK	2	1	6	2	2	4	3	5	3	4																
Aris	5	3	5	7	7	6	5	4	5	5																
OFI	4	7	7	3	4	5	7	6	6	6																
A.E. Kifisia	7	10	12	12	9	9	10	7	7	7																
Kalamata	9	12	11	9	10	10	6	8	8	8																
Iraklis	13	9	8	8	8	7	8	9	9	9																
Panetolikos	3	2	2	4	6	8	9	10	10	10																
Asteras Tripolis	11	13	13	13	12	11	11	11	12	11																
Atromitos	10	11	10	10	11	12	12	13	13	12																
Levadiakos	14	14	14	14	14	13	13	12	11	13																
Volos	12	8	9	11	13	14	14	14	14	14																

Leader and Championship play-offs
Championship play-offs
Europe play-offs
Relegation play-outs

Updated to match(es) played on 8 November 2026. Source: Super League Greece

== Season statistics ==
As of 8 November 2026

=== Top scorers ===
Rank	Player	Club	Goals
1	(Hungary) Barnabás Varga	AEK Athens	6
2	(Portugal) Jota Silva	Olympiacos	5
2	(Greece) Andrews Tetteh	Panathinaikos	5
2	(Poland) Dawid Kurminowski	Kalamata	5
2	(Serbia) Luka Jović	AEK Athens	5
6	(Spain) Jorge Pombo	A.E. Kifisia	4
6	(Chile) Ángelo Sagal	A.E. Kifisia	4
6	(Brazil) Fabiano Leismann	Aris	4
6	(Bosnia and Herzegovina) Kenan Kodro	OFI	4
6	(Nigeria) Cyriel Dessers	Panathinaikos	4
6	(Senegal) Cherif Ndiaye	PAOK	4
12	Eleven players		3

=== Clean sheets ===
Rank	Player	Club	Clean sheets
1	(Germany) Stefan Ortega	Olympiacos	6
2	(Spain) Iñaki Peña	Panathinaikos	5
3	(Greece) Nikos Christogeorgos	OFI	3
3	(Greece) Georgios Athanasiadis	Iraklis	3
5	(Czech Republic) Jiří Pavlenka	PAOK	2
5	(Albania) Thomas Strakosha	AEK Athens	2
5	(Italy) Alberto Brignoli	AEK Athens	2
5	(Ukraine) Yevhen Kucherenko	Panetolikos	2

==== Hat-tricks ====
Numbers in superscript represent the goals that the player scored.

Player	For	Against	Result	Date
(Poland) Dawid Kurminowski	Kalamata	OFI	4–3 (H)	18 October 2026
(Portugal) Jota Silva	Olympiacos	Kalamata	5–0 (H)	25 October 2026

== Awards ==
=== Stoiximan Player of the Month ===
Month	Player	Club	Ref
August	(Romania) Răzvan Marin	AEK Athens	
September	(Serbia) Luka Jović	AEK Athens	
October	(Cameroon) Harold Moukoudi	AEK Athens	
November			
December			
January			
February			
March			
April			
May			

=== Stoiximan Best Goal ===
Matchday	Player	Club	Ref
Regular Season
1st	(Serbia) Luka Jović	AEK Athens	
2nd	(Guinea-Bissau) Nanu	Iraklis	
3rd	(Hungary) Barnabás Varga	AEK Athens	
4th	(Portugal) Pedro Marques	Iraklis	
5th	(Greece) Nikos Athanasiou	OFI	
6th	(Austria) Marco Krainz	Iraklis	
7th			
8th	(Mauritania) Aboubakary Koïta	AEK Athens	
9th	(Argentina) Santino Andino	Panathinaikos	
10th	(Greece) Giannis Gianniotas	Aris	
11th			
12th			
13th			
14th			
15th			
16th			
17th			
18th			
19th			
20th			
21st			
22nd			
23rd			
24th			
25th			
26th			
