= Thiago Romano =

Argentine footballer (born 2006)

Personal information
- Date of birth: 23 June 2006 (age 20)
- Place of birth: Buenos Aires, Argentina
- Height: 1.80 m (5 ft 11 in)
- Position: Winger

Team information
- Current team: OFI
- Number: 30

Youth career
- –2024: Panathinaikos
- 2024–2026: Inter Milan

Senior career*
Years	Team	Apps	(Gls)
2026–	OFI	5	(0)

International career^{‡}
2024–	Argentina U20	5	(0)
- * Club domestic league appearances and goals as of 31 May 2026 ‡ National team caps and goals as of 6 November 2024

Thiago Romano (Greek: Τιάγκο Ρομάνο; born 23 June 2006) is an Argentine-Greek footballer who plays as a winger for Greek Super League club OFI.

== Life and career ==
Romano was born on 23 June 2006 in Buenos Aires, Argentina. He is the son of Argentine footballer Diego Romano. He grew up in Crete, Greece. He mainly operates as a winger. He specifically operates as a left-winger. He can also operate as a midfielder. He is left-footed. He is known for his versatility. He is also known for his dribbling ability. He has received comparisons to Argentine footballer Matías Soulé.

As a youth player, he joined the youth academy of Greek side Panathinaikos. He was described as "went through the ranks to play a leading role with the Athens club's Under 19s" while playing for the club. In 2024, he joined the youth academy of Italian side Inter Milan.

On 6 February 2026, Romano joined Greek Super League club OFI, signing a contact until June 2029.

He is an Argentine youth international.

== Honours ==
OFI

- Greek Cup: 2025–26
- Greek Super Cup: 2026
