= 2026 Greek Super Cup =

AEK Athens	OFI
2	2
- OFI won 5–4 on penalties
- Date: 12 August 2026
- Venue: Pankritio Stadium, Heraklion
- Man of the Match: Thanasis Androutsos (OFI)
- Referee: Anastasios Papapetrou (Athens)
- Weather: Fair; 28 °C (82 °F); 70% humidity

The 2026 Greek Super Cup was the 11th edition of the Greek Super Cup, a football match between the winners of the previous Super League Greece and the holders of the previous Greek Cup. The match was held on 12 August 2026 at the Pankritio Stadium and was the opening match to the 2026–27 football season in Greece. The contesting teams were the 2025–26 Super League Greece champions, AEK Athens and the 2025–26 Greek Cup winners, OFI.

OFI won the trophy with 5–4 on penalties, after the match ended in a 2–2 draw in regulation time.

== Venue ==
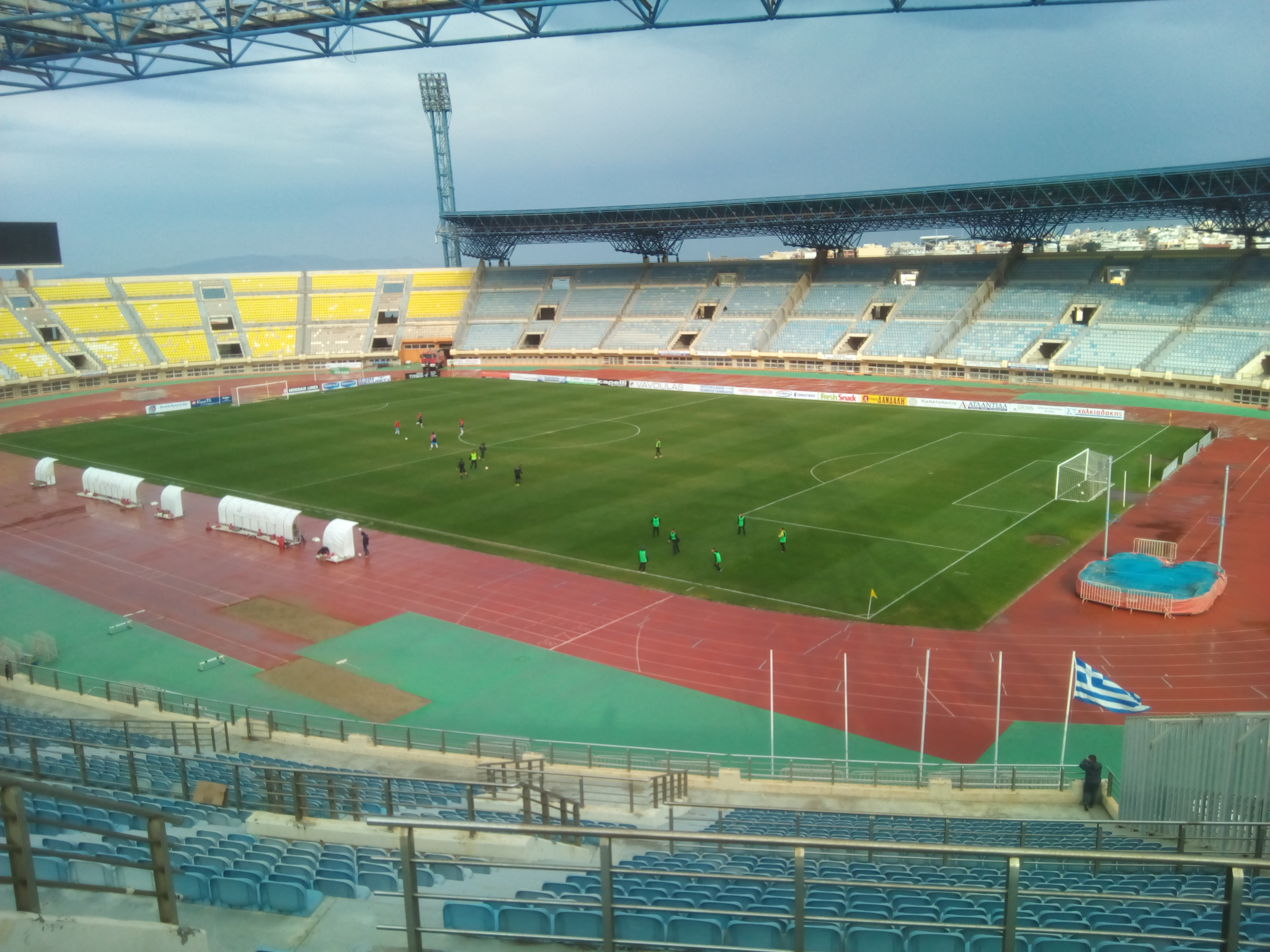
Pankritio Stadium

This was the second Greek Super Cup held at the Pankritio Stadium, after 2025.

The Pankritio Stadium was built in 2004. The stadium is used as a venue for OFI and was used for Ergotelis and Greece. Its current capacity is 26,240.

== Background ==
AEK Athens has participated in the Greek Super Cup five times, winning two of them. The last time that they had played in the Super Cup was in 1996, where they had won Panathinaikos 9–8 on penalties, which came after a 1–1 draw at the end of the extra time.

OFI has participated in the Greek Super Cup two times, winning none of them. The last time that they had played in the Super Cup was in 2025, where they lost to Olympiacos 3–0.

The two teams had never met each other before in the Super Cup.

== Match ==
=== Details ===
12 August 2026
20:00 EEST

AEK Athens	2–2	OFI
Jović 38'; Zini 90+7'	Report	Androutsos 69'; Kostoulas 76'
Penalties
Jović (penalty scored); Majer (penalty scored); Mantalos (penalty scored); Varga (penalty missed); Zini (penalty scored)	4–5	(penalty scored) Iseka; (penalty scored) Bouchalakis; (penalty scored) Dickmann; (penalty scored) Athanasiou; (penalty scored) Androutsos

Pankritio Stadium, Heraklion
Referee: Anastasios Papapetrou (Athens)

AEK Athens	OFI

GK	41	(Greece) Marios Balamotis		(substituted off) 90+9'
RB	23	(Greece) Lazaros Rota		(substituted off) 90+9'
CB	2	(Cameroon) Harold Moukoudi (c)
CB	44	(Portugal) Filipe Relvas
LB	3	(Albania) Stavros Pilios
CM	18	(Romania) Răzvan Marin	(yellow card) 34'	(substituted off) 81'
CM	6	(Finland) Kaan Kairinen		(substituted off) 81'
RM	17	(Greece) Dimitris Kaloskamis
LM	11	(Mauritania) Aboubakary Koïta		(substituted off) 63'
CF	25	(Hungary) Barnabás Varga
CF	9	(Serbia) Luka Jović
Substitutes:
GK	1	(Albania) Thomas Strakosha		(substituted on) 90+8'
GK	91	(Italy) Alberto Brignoli
DF	5	(Greece) Christos Alexiou
DF	21	(Croatia) Domagoj Vida
DF	29	(Scotland) James Penrice
DF	57	(Greece) Spyros Christakopoulos		(substituted on) 90+8'
MF	8	(Serbia) Mijat Gaćinović
MF	10	(Ukraine) Oleksandr Zubkov
MF	14	(Croatia) Lovro Majer		(substituted on) 63'
MF	20	(Greece) Petros Mantalos	(yellow card) 90+5'	(substituted on) 81'
MF	27	(Hungary) Milán Vitális
FW	90	(Angola) Zini		(substituted on) 81'
Manager:
(Serbia) Marko Nikolić

GK	31	(Greece) Nikos Christogeorgos
CB	5	(Greece) Konstantinos Kostoulas
CB	15	(Greece) Achilleas Poungouras
CB	16	(Cyprus) Christos Sielis
DM	6	(Greece) Zisis Karachalios		(substituted off) 56'
DM	14	(Greece) Thanasis Androutsos (c)
RM	21	(Greece) Giannis Apostolakis	(yellow card) 43'	(substituted off) 74'
LM	3	(Greece) Nikos Athanasiou
RW	11	(Greece) Taxiarchis Fountas		(substituted off) 75'
LW	10	(Spain) Aitor Cantalapiedra		(substituted off) 86'
CF	18	(Argentina) Thiago Nuss		(substituted off) 86'
Substitutes:
GK	1	(Albania) Klidman Lilo
GK	13	(Greece) Panagiotis Katsikas
CB	2	(Croatia) Krešimir Krizmanić
DF	24	(Italy) Lorenzo Dickmann		(substituted on) 75'
DF	43	(Greece) Dimitrios Nikolaou
DF	90	(Greece) Pavlos Kenourgiakis
MF	7	(Greece) Georgios Kanellopoulos		(substituted on) 86'
MF	30	(Argentina) Thiago Romano
MF	41	(Greece) Andreas Bouchalakis		(substituted on) 56'
MF	71	(Greece) Athanasios Sitmalidis
FW	46	(Greece) Giannis Theodosoulakis		(substituted on) 74'
FW	99	(Belgium) Aaron Leya Iseka		(substituted on) 86'
Manager:
(Greece) Christos Kontis

Man of the Match:
Thanasis Androutsos (OFI)

Assistant referees:
Tryfonas Petropoulos (Arcadia)
Petros Patras (Macedonia)
Fourth official:
Alexandros Katsikogiannis (Epirus)
Video assistant referee:
Spyros Zabalas (Epirus)
Assistant video assistant referee:
Meletis Gioumatzidis (Pella)
Offside video assistant referee:

Match rules

- 90 minutes
- Penalty shoot-out if scores still level
- Twelve named substitutes, of which up to five may be used at maximum three times.
