= Klidman Lilo =

Albanian footballer

Personal information
- Date of birth: 31 January 2003 (age 23)
- Place of birth: Athens, Greece
- Height: 1.90 m (6 ft 3 in)
- Position: Goalkeeper

Team information
- Current team: OFI
- Number: 1

Youth career
- 2018–2023: Panathinaikos

Senior career*
Years	Team	Apps	(Gls)
2023–2024	Panathinaikos B	10	(0)
2024–2025	Panathinaikos	0	(0)
2025–	OFI	10	(0)

International career^{‡}
2022–2024	Albania U21	9	(0)
- * Club domestic league appearances and goals as of 14 June 2026 ‡ National team caps and goals as of 13 September 2024

Klidman Lilo (born 31 January 2003) is a professional footballer who plays as a goalkeeper for Greek Super League club OFI. Born into an Albanian family in Greece, he is a youth international for Albania.

== Career ==
=== Panathinaikos ===
Lilo joined Panathinaikos from the team's youth ranks.

On 18 February 2023, Lilo signed a professional contract with Panathinaikos until the summer of 2025.

=== OFI Crete ===
On 25 April 2026, he won the 2025–26 Greek Cup with OFI Crete, coming on as an 89th-minute substitute for Nikos Christogeorgos in the final against PAOK with his side leading 2–1; after PAOK equalised in the 97th minute, the match went to extra time, where OFI scored a penalty in the 105th+4th minute to secure a 3–2 victory, with Lilo also receiving a yellow card in the 120th minute for time-wasting.

== Honours ==
OFI

- Greek Cup: 2025–26
- Greek Super Cup: 2026
