= Achilleas Poungouras =

Greek footballer

Personal information
- Date of birth: 13 December 1995 (age 30)
- Place of birth: Thessaloniki, Greece
- Height: 1.87 m (6 ft 1 1/2 in)
- Position: Centre-back

Team information
- Current team: OFI
- Number: 15

Youth career
- 2010–2012: Promitheas Larissa
- 2012–2014: PAOK

Senior career*
Years	Team	Apps	(Gls)
2014–2018	PAOK	8	(0)
2015–2016	→ Veria (loan)	19	(0)
2018	→ Arka Gdynia (loan)	3	(0)
2018–2023	Panathinaikos	82	(0)
2023–2025	Sivasspor	37	(0)
2026–	OFI	18	(0)

International career
2013	Greece U18	4	(0)
2013	Greece U19	3	(0)
2015–2016	Greece U21	4	(0)
- * Club domestic league appearances and goals as of 20 September 2026

Achilleas Poungouras (Greek: Αχιλλέας Πούγγουρας; born 13 December 1995) is a Greek professional footballer who plays as a centre-back for Super League club OFI.

== Career ==
Born in Thessaloniki, Poungouras began his career with hometown club PAOK, progressing through the organisation's youth system to eventually break into the first team in the 2014–15 season. However, he failed to hold down a spot in the senior roster, subsequently sent on loan to Veria and to Polish club Arka Gdynia. On 10 February 2017, Poungouras extended his contract with PAOK until 2019.

On 25 July 2018, Panathinaikos signed Poungouras with a three-year contract through to 2021. Poungouras moved to Panathinaikos as a free agent from PAOK, who kept a resale rate of 40%. Poungouras overtook João Nunes and Dimitrios Kolovetsios in popularity and has his performances are being tracked by Greek national coach John van 't Schip.

On 29 June 2020, Panathinaikos officially announced the extension of his contract, until the summer of 2023. On 3 March 2021, Pougouras scored his first professional goal with a header in the home defeat of Panathinaikos by PAS Giannina, losing the qualification to the semifinals of the Greek Cup.

On 11 August 2023, Poungouras known to be dependable at the back, recognized for his strong tackling, adept aerial ability, and reliable passing, he signed a two years' contract with Turkish club Sivasspor.

== Career statistics ==
As of match played 15 February 2025

Appearances and goals by club, season and competition
Club	Season	League			National cup (Note: Includes Greek Cup, Turkish Cup)		Europe		Total	
Club	Season	Division	Apps	Goals	Apps	Goals	Apps	Goals	Apps	Goals
PAOK	2014–15	Super League Greece	2	0	0	0	0	0	2	0
PAOK	2015–16	Super League Greece	0	0	—		1 (Note: Appearance in UEFA Europa League)	0	1	0
PAOK	2016–17	Super League Greece	5	0	1	0	1	0	7	0
PAOK	2017–18	Super League Greece	1	0	2	0	0	0	3	0
PAOK	Total		8	0	3	0	2	0	13	0
Veria (loan)	2015–16	Super League Greece	19	0	3	0	—		22	0
Arka Gdynia (loan)	2017–18	Ekstraklasa	3	0	0	0	—		3	0
Panathinaikos	2018–19	Super League Greece	15	0	4	0	—		19	0
Panathinaikos	2019–20	Super League Greece	24	0	4	0	—		28	0
Panathinaikos	2020–21	Super League Greece	27	0	2	1	—		29	1
Panathinaikos	2021–22	Super League Greece	8	0	2	0	—		10	0
Panathinaikos	2022–23	Super League Greece	8	0	2	0	1 (Note: Appearance in UEFA Europa Conference League)	0	11	0
Panathinaikos	Total		82	0	14	1	1	0	97	1
Sivasspor	2023–24	Süper Lig	18	0	3	0	—		21	0
Sivasspor	2024–25	Süper Lig	15	0	1	0	—		16	0
Sivasspor	Total		33	0	4	0	0	0	37	0
Career total			145	0	24	1	3	0	172	1

== Honours ==
PAOK

- Greek Cup: 2016–17, 2017–18

Panathinaikos

- Greek Cup: 2021–22

OFI

- Greek Cup: 2025–26
- Greek Super Cup: 2026
