= Taxiarchis Fountas =

Greek footballer (born 1995)

Personal information
- Full name: Taxiarchis Fountas
- Date of birth: 4 September 1995 (age 31)
- Place of birth: Messolonghi, Greece
- Height: 1.70 m (5 ft 7 in)
- Position: Forward

Team information
- Current team: OFI
- Number: 11

Youth career
- –2011: Acheloos Neochori
- 2011: AEK Athens

Senior career*
Years	Team	Apps	(Gls)
2011–2013	AEK Athens	35	(4)
2013–2016	Red Bull Salzburg	0	(0)
2013	→ Liefering (loan)	6	(0)
2014	→ Grödig (loan)	7	(0)
2014–2015	→ Panionios (loan)	26	(4)
2015–2016	→ Asteras Tripolis (loan)	16	(1)
2016–2017	Panionios	19	(2)
2017–2018	Sonnenhof Grossaspach	14	(1)
2018–2019	St. Pölten	21	(4)
2019–2022	Rapid Wien	68	(35)
2022–2023	D.C. United	38	(18)
2023–2024	Trabzonspor	29	(2)
2024–	OFI	62	(16)

International career^{‡}
2011	Greece U17	5	(1)
2012–2014	Greece U19	12	(1)
2013	Greece U20	1	(0)
2015	Greece U21	3	(1)
2015–	Greece	19	(1)
- * Club domestic league appearances and goals as of 8 November 2026 ‡ National team caps and goals as of 20 March 2025

Taxiarchis Fountas (Greek: Ταξιάρχης Φούντας; born 4 September 1995) is a Greek professional footballer who plays as a forward for Super League club OFI and the Greece national team.

After beginning his career at AEK Athens, where he became the youngest player to appear for the club in the Super League, he joined Red Bull Salzburg in 2013, which loaned him to Liefering, Grödig, Panionios and Asteras Tripolis. After a second spell at Panionios and a season in Germany with Sonnenhof Großaspach, he returned to the Austrian Bundesliga with St. Pölten and Rapid Wien. He joined D.C. United of Major League Soccer in 2022, reportedly as the club's highest-paid player. He was twice accused of directing a racial slur at another player, an opponent in 2022 and a teammate in 2023, which he denied. MLS did not discipline him over the first, saying it could not verify what he had said; after the league found the second allegation credible, he and the club agreed in August 2023 to terminate his contract. He joined Trabzonspor in 2023 and OFI in 2024, and won the Greek Cup with OFI in 2026.

Fountas made his senior international debut for Greece in 2015 and scored his first international goal in 2022.

== Club career ==
=== AEK Athens ===
Taxiarchis Fountas was scouted by Toni Savevski, the head of AEK Athens' youth academy at the time. On 17 March 2012, Fountas made his senior debut for AEK Athens against Asteras Tripolis, becoming the youngest player to play for AEK Athens in a Super League game, aged 16 years, 6 months and 13 days. He played 31 minutes in this game. He made his first start for the club on 22 April on the final day of the 2011–12 regular season against Doxa Drama, completing the whole 90 minutes.

Fountas scored his first goal for the club in a 1–0 win against Platanias on 28 October 2012, thus becoming the youngest player to score for AEK at the age of 17 years and 54 days. He scored another goal against Veria on 18 October 2012 and another one against PAS Giannina on 3 November 2012. He was named the most valuable player of that match. He scored his fourth goal, again against Veria, on 16 March 2013. When the club was relegated, he was released. He also scored against Everton in a friendly match in the summer of 2012.

=== Red Bull Salzburg ===
In June Fountas was linked with a move to Red Bull Salzburg. A potential transfer was complicated by the financial problems of Fountas' club AEK Athens, which was on the verge of financial collapse. In September 2013, he joined the club on a four-year contract. After the signing of his contract, Fountas joined FC Liefering of the Austrian Football First League on a six-month loan.

In January 2014, Fountas moved on loan to SV Grödig until the end of the season. He made his first appearance in the Austrian Bundesliga a week later.

At the beginning of the 2014–15 season, Fountas moved on loan to Panionios, returning to the Super League Greece.

After a season with Panionios, he was loaned to Asteras Tripolis. On 2 January 2016, he scored his first goal for the club in a 4–0 home win against Panthrakikos. On 5 January 2016, a few days after his first league goal for the club, he scored in a 3–0 away win against AEL in the Greek Cup.

=== Panionios ===
On 21 July 2016, Fountas, who had been released from Asteras Tripolis, signed a one-year contract, with the option of a second year, and returned to Panionios. On 1 July 2017, Panionios and Fountas terminated his contract by mutual agreement.

=== Sonnenhof Großaspach ===
On 20 September 2017, as a free agent, Fountas signed with German 3. Liga club SG Sonnenhof Großaspach. He was signed by their Greek sporting director, Yiannis Koukoutrigas.

=== St. Pölten ===
On 14 July 2018, after a year in Germany, Fountas signed a season-long contract with Austrian club St. Pölten. He scored four goals in 21 games in his only season.

=== Rapid Wien ===
On 9 May 2019, Fountas signed a deal with Austrian club Rapid Wien through the summer of 2022, with his St. Pölten contract due to expire. On 4 August, he scored his first goal for the club in a 2–2 away draw against his previous club and a week later he scored a brace against SC Rheindorf Altach, contributing to his team's first win of the season. On 29 September, in a 3–3 home draw against TSV Hartberg, he scored another brace. On 15 December, he scored his third brace of the season, sealing a 3–0 away win against Admira Wacker, which earned him a place in the Austrian Bundesliga Team of the Week for matchday 18. Fountas led the club's scoring with 11 goals from 15 matches.

On 3 February 2020, Rapid Wien's fans named Fountas as the best player of 2019. On 1 July, he scored in his fifth game in a row, a 3–1 home win against LASK. He finished the 2019–20 Austrian Football Bundesliga campaign with 19 goals, to help his club earn a berth in the UEFA Champions League qualifiers. He was the third-highest scorer in the league, trailing only Shon Weissman (30 goals, Wolfsberger) and Patson Daka (24 goals, Red Bull Salzburg).

On 30 August 2020, in his first official game for the 2020–21 season, he scored a hat-trick in a 5–0 Austrian Cup win against TSV St. Johann. On 11 September 2020, Fountas scored a brace as his club beat Admira in the 2020–21 Austrian Football Bundesliga opener. He scored again during a 2–1 defeat to Arsenal in the Europa League group stage on 22 October, capitalising on an error by goalkeeper Bernd Leno to put the ball in the net.

On 18 January 2021, Fountas spat at Lukas Malicsek in the friendly match between his club and Admira, with the Austrian Bundesliga punishing him for four games. On 4 April, he scored a hat-trick in his team's 8–1 away win against Wolfsberger AC.

On 8 August 2021, Fountas scored a hat-trick, once in the first half and twice in quick succession in the second, in a 3–0 home win against Wolfsberger AC; later in the month he scored in both legs of a 2021–22 UEFA Europa League playoffs tie against FC Zorya Luhansk in a 6–2 aggregate win over the Ukrainian side.

=== D.C. United ===
On 25 January 2022, according to a report in The Washington Post, Fountas agreed a three-year contract with MLS club D.C. United and would become its highest-paid player with a reported contract worth a total of $7 million. He was initially not expected to arrive from Rapid Wien until summer 2022, when his contract expired. On 21 March, it was announced that he would join D.C. United ahead of the summer.

Fountas made his debut for D.C. United on 16 April, in a 2–3 loss against Austin FC. In his second game and first start for the club, he scored twice and assisted another goal in a 3–2 win over the New England Revolution. On 4 July, he scored a hat-trick in a 5–3 win at Orlando City SC.

==== Racial slur allegations and contract termination ====
During a match between D.C. United and Inter Miami on 18 September 2022, Fountas and Miami defender Damion Lowe were both booked after exchanging words in the second half, and Fountas was accused of directing a racial slur, the n-word, at Lowe. After Miami's players said they would not continue unless action was taken, D.C. United coach Wayne Rooney substituted Fountas, and MLS opened an investigation into the incident. Fountas denied the allegation in a statement on Instagram, saying that he had not used the word and that he rejected racism in any form. The referee's report stated that none of the officials, including the video assistant referee, had heard racist or abusive language. On 31 October, MLS said it had found the allegation "credible" but could not independently verify what Fountas had said, and that it would not discipline him. Fountas spent the investigation in Greece and, citing personal reasons, did not rejoin the team for the rest of the season.

On 21 July 2023, D.C. United placed Fountas and teammate Nigel Robertha on administrative leave while MLS investigated "possible violations of league policy." The club gave no reason, but The Athletic reported that Fountas had been accused of directing a racial slur at Robertha during a training session, and that Robertha had then physically attacked him. Later reporting said that the two had argued on the field during the team's 4–0 defeat away to the New England Revolution on 15 July until Christian Benteke intervened, and that Robertha had allegedly struck Fountas with a foam roller in the locker room afterwards; Robertha then alleged that Fountas had used the n-word during the argument on the field, which Fountas denied. Fountas took a polygraph test he had commissioned, in which he denied using the slur, and submitted the results to the club and the league. Robertha was reinstated on 24 July, while Fountas remained on leave; sources briefed on the investigation told The Athletic that no other player interviewed had heard Fountas use the slur.

On 10 August 2023, D.C. United and Fountas mutually agreed to terminate his contract. The club said that he had been placed on leave after the league determined that there were credible allegations that he had used prohibited and discriminatory language against another player. Rooney later said that it was difficult to say whether Fountas was guilty because no one knew what he had said, but that the club had had to make a decision.

=== Trabzonspor ===
Fountas joined Trabzonspor in 2023.

=== OFI ===
Fountas joined OFI in 2024, signing a two-year contract. On 25 April 2026, Fountas scored a goal in OFI's 3–2 win over PAOK in the Greek Cup final. The victory was OFI's first major trophy since its 1986–87 Greek Cup triumph.

== International career ==
Fountas made his international debut for Greece on 13 June 2015, in a UEFA Euro 2016 qualifier away to the Faroe Islands. In the 2–1 loss, he came on in the 81st minute for Panagiotis Kone.

He did not play for Greece again from September 2015 until 2020. He scored his first international goal on 17 November 2022, coming on for Dimitrios Pelkas and equalising in added time at the end of a 2–2 draw away to Malta.

== Career statistics ==
=== Club ===
As of match played 8 November 2026

Appearances and goals by club, season and competition
Club	Season	League			National cup (Note: Includes Greek Football Cup, Austrian Cup, DFB-Pokal, Turkish Cup)		Continental		Other		Total	
Club	Season	Division	Apps	Goals	Apps	Goals	Apps	Goals	Apps	Goals	Apps	Goals
AEK Athens	2011–12	Super League Greece	8	0	0	0	—		—		8	0
AEK Athens	2012–13	Super League Greece	27	4	0	0	—		—		27	4
AEK Athens	Total		35	4	0	0	—		—		35	4
Red Bull Salzburg	2013–14	Austrian Bundesliga	0	0	1	0	0	0	—		1	0
FC Liefering	2013–14	2. Liga	6	0	1	0	—		—		6	0
Grödig (loan)	2013–14	Austrian Bundesliga	7	0	0	0	—		—		7	0
Panionios (loan)	2014–15	Super League Greece	26	4	7	0	—		—		33	4
Asteras Tripolis (loan)	2015–16	Super League Greece	16	1	4	3	4 (Note: Appearances in UEFA Europa League)	0	—		24	4
Panionios (loan)	2016–17	Super League Greece	19	2	1	0	—		—		20	2
Sonnenhof Großaspach	2017–18	3. Liga	14	1	2	0	—		—		16	1
St. Pölten	2018–19	Austrian Bundesliga	21	4	1	0	—		—		22	4
Rapid Wien	2019–20	Austrian Bundesliga	27	19	2	1	—		—		29	20
Rapid Wien	2020–21	Austrian Bundesliga	24	9	2	4	5 (Note: Two appearances in UEFA Champions League, three appearances and one goal in UEFA Europa League)	1	—		31	14
Rapid Wien	2021–22	Austrian Bundesliga	17	7	3	1	11 (Note: Two appearances in UEFA Champions League, eight appearances and three goals in UEFA Europa League, one appearance in UEFA Europa Conference League)	3	—		31	11
Rapid Wien	Total		68	35	7	6	16	4	—		91	45
D.C. United	2022	Major League Soccer	21	12	0	0	—		—		21	12
D.C. United	2023	Major League Soccer	17	6	0	0	—		—		17	6
D.C. United	Total		38	18	0	0	—		—		38	18
Trabzonspor	2023–24	Süper Lig	29	2	6	4	—		—		35	6
OFI	2024–25	Super League Greece	28	6	7	3	—		—		35	9
OFI	2025–26	Super League Greece	25	9	6	1	—		1 (Note: Appearance in Greek Super Cup)	0	32	10
OFI	2026–27	Super League Greece	9	1	2	0	6 (Note: Appearance in UEFA Europa League)	4	1	0	18	5
OFI	Total		62	16	15	4	6	4	2	0	85	24
Career total			341	87	45	17	27	9	2	0	414	110

=== International ===
As of 20 March 2025

Appearances and goals by national team and year
National team	Year	Apps	Goals
Greece
Greece	2015	3	0
Greece	2016	0	0
Greece	2017	0	0
Greece	2018	0	0
Greece	2019	0	0
Greece	2020	4	0
Greece	2021	1	0
Greece	2022	4	1
Greece	2023	6	0
Greece	2024	0	0
Greece	2025	1	0
Total		19	1

== Honours ==
Red Bull Salzburg

- Austrian Bundesliga: 2013–14
- Austrian Cup: 2013–14

OFI

- Greek Cup: 2025–26
- Greek Super Cup: 2026

Individual

- Best Greek Player playing Abroad: 2019–20
- Austrian Bundesliga Team of the Year: 2019–20
- Rapid Wien Best Player Award: 2019
- MLS All-Star: 2022
