= Panagiotis Katsikas =

Greek footballer

Personal information
- Date of birth: 10 March 1999 (age 27)
- Place of birth: Athens, Greece
- Height: 1.90 m (6 ft 3 in)
- Position: Goalkeeper

Team information
- Current team: OFI
- Number: 13

Senior career*
Years	Team	Apps	(Gls)
2017–2018	Anagennisi Karditsa	2	(0)
2018–2021	Lamia	4	(0)
2021–2025	Panserraikos	34	(0)
2025–	OFI	1	(0)
- * Club domestic league appearances and goals as of 14 June 2026

Panagiotis Katsikas (Greek: Παναγιώτης Κατσίκας; born 10 March 1999) is a Greek professional footballer who plays as a goalkeeper for Super League club OFI.

== Honours ==
OFI

- Greek Cup: 2025–26
- Greek Super Cup: 2026
