= Nikos Athanasiou =

Greek footballer (born 2001)

Personal information
- Full name: Nikolaos Athanasiou
- Date of birth: 16 March 2001 (age 25)
- Place of birth: Athens, Greece
- Height: 1.77 m (5 ft 10 in)
- Position: Left-back

Team information
- Current team: OFI (on loan from Olympiacos)
- Number: 3

Youth career
- 2013–2014: Olympiacos
- 2014–2020: Atromitos

Senior career*
Years	Team	Apps	(Gls)
2020–2025	Atromitos	55	(4)
2022	→ Niki Volos (loan)	20	(0)
2025–	Olympiacos	0	(0)
2025–2026	→ Rio Ave (loan)	17	(0)
2026–	→ OFI (loan)	19	(1)
- * Club domestic league appearances and goals as of 20 September 2026

Nikos Athanasiou (Greek: Νίκος Αθανασίου; born 16 March 2001) is a Greek professional footballer who plays as a left-back for Super League club OFI, on loan from Olympiacos.

== Career ==
Athanasiou was born in Athens. He comes from the youth ranks of Atromitos.

In January 2025, Athanasiou scored in what would be an Atromitos tie to Panathinaikos in the Greek Cup.

On 4 July 2025, Athanasiou joined Super League Greece club Olympiacos. Four days later, he was sent on a season-long loan to Primeira Liga side Rio Ave.

== Career stats ==
As of 31 May 2026

Club	Season	League			Cup		Continental		Other		Total	
Club	Season	Division	Apps	Goals	Apps	Goals	Apps	Goals	Apps	Goals	Apps	Goals
Atromitos	2020–21	Superleague Greece	1	0	0	0	—		—		1	0
Atromitos	2021–22	Superleague Greece	2	0	1	0	—		—		3	0
Atromitos	2022–23	Superleague Greece	5	0	2	0	—		—		7	0
Atromitos	2023–24	Superleague Greece	17	1	5	0	—		—		22	1
Atromitos	2024–25	Superleague Greece	30	3	3	1	—		—		33	4
Atromitos	Total		55	4	11	1	—		—		66	5
Niki Volos (loan)	2021–22	Superleague Greece 2	20	0	0	0	—		—		20	0
Rio Ave (loan)	2025–26	Primeira Liga	17	0	1	0	—		—		18	0
OFI (loan)	2025–26	Superleague Greece	14	0	2	0	—		—		16	0
Career total			106	4	14	1	0	0	0	0	120	5

== Honours ==
OFI

- Greek Cup: 2025–26
- Greek Super Cup: 2026

Individual

- Super League Greece Team of the Season: 2024–25
