= Christos Kontis =

Retired Greek footballer (born 1975)

Personal information
- Full name: Christos Kontis
- Date of birth: 13 May 1975 (age 51)
- Place of birth: Athens, Greece
- Height: 1.82 m (6 ft 0 in)
- Position: Defender

Team information
- Current team: OFI (manager)

Youth career
- 1987–1995: A.O. Kifisia

Senior career*
Years	Team	Apps	(Gls)
1995–1999	Ethnikos Piraeus	105	(4)
1999–2000	Panionios	27	(2)
2000–2002	Olympiacos	21	(0)
2002–2004	Panionios	41	(6)
2004–2006	AEK Athens	40	(2)
2006–2011	APOEL	129	(9)
Total		363	(23)

Managerial career
- 2011–2013: APOEL (assistant)
- 2013–2016: Al-Nasr (assistant)
- 2017–2018: Olympiacos (assistant)
- 2018: Olympiacos (interim)
- 2019–2020: Hatta
- 2021–2023: Panathinaikos (assistant)
- 2024: Volos
- 2024: Panathinaikos (interim)
- 2024: Al-Fayha
- 2025: Panathinaikos (interim)
- 2025–: OFI
- * Club domestic league appearances and goals

Christos Kontis (Greek: Χρήστος Κόντης, born 13 May 1975) is a Greek professional football manager and former player. He is the current manager of Super League club OFI.

== Playing career ==
Kontis started his career at A.E. Kifisia and in 1995 he moved to Ethnikos Piraeus, where he became a professional. There he spent four seasons playing as a starter until 1999 when he moved to Panionios. In 2000 he was transferred to Olympiacos, where he was used as a back-up choice. During his spell at the club he won 3 Greek Championships. On 19 July 2004 he was moved to the rivals, AEK Athens.

In the summer of 2006 he moved to Cyprus and signed with APOEL. During his five-year spell with APOEL, he won 3 Championships, 1 Cup and 3 Super Cups. He also appeared in four official 2009–10 UEFA Champions League group stage matches with APOEL.

=== APOEL ===
After a successful career at APOEL, Kontis was forced to retire due to heart failure problems. During the first official 2011–12 Cypriot First Division match (29 August 2011) between AEK Larnaca and APOEL, Kontis felt a slight discomfort and a pain in his chest. Later that night the discomfort continued to exist and the pain got worse, thus the club's doctors moved him to Nicosia's General Hospital. It was diagnosed that Kontis had suffered a minor heart attack that had damaged one of the veins in his heart. Consequently, he was forced to retire from his professional football career 9 months before his contract with APOEL expires.

With APOEL, Kontis wore jersey with the number 24.

== Managerial career ==
When Christos Kontis recovered fully from the heart incident that forced him to retire, the Board of Directors of APOEL appointed him as an assistant of the manager of APOEL, Ivan Jovanović. He served this position for two years, until the end of 2013.

Kontis has served as an assistant manager of the manager of Al-Nasr, Ivan Jovanović from 2013 to 2016. He was subsequently hired by Olympiacos for the same role, and served as the team's caretaker manager for a fixture against Larisa on 7 January 2018, while the transition from Takis Lemonis to the club's new manager Óscar García took place; he also coached the team in a Greek Cup quarter-final return leg game against rivals AEK Athens on 7 February 2018 as García was hospitalised with an appendicitis inflammation. He also finished the season as a head manager for the last month of the 2017–18 campaign.

On the summer of 2019, Christos took his first full managerial job at Hatta with the job of keeping the promoted club in the top flight of UAE football. However on November of 2020, he was sacked due to lack of victories, during the cancelled 19–20 season, Hatta was at the relegation zone and in the first six matches of the following 20–21 season, Hatta was at the bottom of the league with 1 point.

On 8 July 2024, Kontis was appointed as manager of Saudi Pro League side Al-Fayha.

On 17 September 2025, Kontis was appointed as interim manager of Panathinaikos.

On 29 October 2025, Kontis was appointed as the manager of OFI.

=== Managerial statistics ===
As of match played 22 November 2026

Team	Nat	From	To	Record							
Team	Nat	From	To	G	W	D	L	GF	GA	GD	Win %
Olympiacos	(Greece)	4 January 2018	8 January 2018	1	1	0	0	3	0	+3	100.00
Olympiacos	(Greece)	3 April 2018	5 May 2018	4	2	0	2	8	4	+4	50.00
Hatta	(United Arab Emirates)	10 June 2019	22 November 2020	34	5	8	21	26	64	−38	14.71
Volos	(Greece)	22 February 2024	17 May 2024	10	5	2	3	14	13	+1	50.00
Panathinaikos	(Greece)	17 May 2024	31 May 2024	2	1	1	0	3	2	+1	50.00
Al-Fayha	(Saudi Arabia)	8 July 2024	4 December 2024	14	3	4	7	12	21	−9	21.43
Panathinaikos	(Greece)	18 September 2025	24 October 2025	7	3	2	2	11	9	+2	42.86
OFI	(Greece)	26 October 2025	present	54	25	8	21	74	69	+5	46.30
Total				129	45	25	59	151	182	−31	34.88

== Honours ==
=== Player ===
Olympiacos

- Greek Super League: 2000-01, 2001–02, 2002–03

APOEL

- Cypriot First Division: 2006–07, 2008–09, 2010–11
- Cypriot Cup: 2007–08
- Cypriot Super Cup: 2008, 2009, 2011

=== Manager ===
Panathinaikos

- Greek Cup: 2023–24

OFI

- Greek Cup: 2025–26
- Greek Super Cup: 2026
