= Giannis Theodosoulakis =

Greek footballer

Personal information
- Full name: Ioannis Fivos Theodosoulakis
- Date of birth: 11 September 2004 (age 22)
- Place of birth: Rethymno, Crete, Greece
- Height: 1.80 m (5 ft 11 in)
- Position: Forward

Team information
- Current team: OFI
- Number: 46

Youth career
- 2019–2022: OFI

Senior career*
Years	Team	Apps	(Gls)
2022–	OFI	50	(4)

International career^{‡}
2025–	Greece U21	5	(0)
- * Club domestic league appearances and goals as of 12 September 2026 ‡ National team caps and goals as of 26 September 2026

Giannis Theodosoulakis (Greek: Γιάννης Θεοδοσουλάκης; born 11 September 2004) is a Greek professional footballer who plays as a forward for Super League club OFI.

== Honours ==
OFI

- Greek Cup: 2025–26
- Greek Super Cup: 2026
