= Saranta Ekklisies =

Neighborhood of Thessaloniki, Greece

Coordinates: 40.632573°N 22.965573°E

Saranta Ekklisies (Greek: Σαράντα Εκκλησιές "Forty Churches") or 40 Ekklisies is a neighbourhood in Thessaloniki, Greece. It is located next to the Ano Poli.

It was created in the 1920s during the Greek-Turkish population exchange by Greek refugees from the city of Saranta Ekklisies (currently known as Kırklareli) in Eastern Thrace.

The central street was constructed in 1940. Beside the area there was the Jewish cemetery.

== Streets ==
- Kyriakidi Street
- Teloglou Street
- Vizyinou Street

== People ==
- Dinos Christianopoulos, poet
