= Giannis Apostolakis =

Greek footballer (born 2004)

Personal information
- Full name: Ioannis Apostolakis
- Date of birth: 24 September 2004 (age 22)
- Place of birth: Rethymno, Crete, Greece
- Height: 1.79 m (5 ft 10 in)
- Position: Midfielder

Team information
- Current team: OFI
- Number: 21

Youth career
- 2019–2022: OFI

Senior career*
Years	Team	Apps	(Gls)
2022–	OFI	72	(4)

International career^{‡}
2023	Greece U19	2	(0)
2024–	Greece U21	10	(0)
- * Club domestic league appearances and goals as of 20 September 2026 ‡ National team caps and goals as of 26 September 2026

Giannis Apostolakis (Greek: Γιάννης Αποστολάκης; born 24 September 2004) is a Greek professional footballer who plays as a midfielder for Super League club OFI.

== Career ==
OFI Crete F.C. announced that Giannis Apostolakis, a player developed through the club's youth academy, extended his contract with OFI until the summer of 2027.

Born in Rethymno, Crete, Apostolakis made his senior team debut on 28 August 2022 in a match against Panathinaikos. Since then, he has made three appearances for the first team. Apostolakis progressed through OFI's youth system, representing the club at U15, U17, and U19 levels, and captained the U19 team during the 2021–22 season.

In July 2023, he was called up to the Greece U19 squad for the UEFA European Under-19 Championship in Malta.

== Career stats ==
As of 26 April 2026

Club	Season	League			Cup		Continental		Other		Total	
Club	Season	Division	Apps	Goals	Apps	Goals	Apps	Goals	Apps	Goals	Apps	Goals
OFI	2022–23	Superleague Greece	3	0	0	0	—		—		3	0
OFI	2023–24	Superleague Greece	13	2	1	0	—		—		14	2
OFI	2024–25	Superleague Greece	24	0	5	0	—		—		29	0
OFI	2025–26	Superleague Greece	25	1	7	0	—		1	0	33	1
OFI	Total		65	3	13	0	0	0	1	0	79	3
Career total			65	3	13	0	0	0	1	0	79	3

== Honours ==
OFI

- Greek Cup: 2025–26
- Greek Super Cup: 2026

Individual

- Super League Greece Best Goal: 2025–26 (Matchday 6)
