= Thanasis Androutsos =

Greek footballer (born 1997)

Personal information
- Full name: Athanasios Georgios Androutsos
- Date of birth: 6 May 1997 (age 29)
- Place of birth: Athens, Greece
- Height: 1.76 m (5 ft 9 in)
- Positions: Midfielder; right back

Team information
- Current team: OFI
- Number: 14

Youth career
- 2008–2016: Olympiacos

Senior career*
Years	Team	Apps	(Gls)
2016–2025	Olympiacos	75	(3)
2019–2020	→ Atromitos (loan)	27	(4)
2022–2024	Olympiacos B	15	(1)
2024	→ VfL Osnabrück (loan)	13	(0)
2025–	OFI	49	(5)

International career^{‡}
2015	Greece U18	2	(1)
2015–2016	Greece U19	7	(0)
2017–2018	Greece U21	12	(6)
2018–	Greece	15	(1)
- * Club domestic league appearances and goals as of 26 October 2026 ‡ National team caps and goals as of 4 October 2026

Athanasios Georgios "Thanasis" Androutsos (Greek: Αθανάσιος Γεώργιος "Θανάσης" Ανδρούτσος, born 6 May 1997) is a Greek professional footballer who plays as a right back or a midfielder for Super League club OFI and the Greece national team.

== Club career ==
On 18 August 2016, Androutsos made his debut with Olympiacos in a European match for UEFA Europa League playoffs against Portuguese club Arouca as a late substitute. On 4 December 2016, he made his debut in the Super League Greece as a late substitute in a 4–0 home win against Levadiakos. On 11 February 2017, he scored after 14 seconds, his first goal in the Super League Greece in a 2–0 home win against AEL.

On 30 August 2019, Androutsos signed a season-long deal with Atromitos on loan from Olympiacos. On 6 October 2019, he scored his first goal with Atromitos in a 3–2 away win against Volos.

Androutos returned to Olympiacos in the summer of 2020, after the season-loan to Atromitos, but from mid-July, he entered the squad on 21 November 2020. He played for less than 10 minutes in the 1–0 derby game against rivals Panathinaikos. Until then, from the management that had been done to him, it was clear that in coming transfer period, he would transfer to another club. Among those clubs, the Dutch club VVV-Venlo offered him a contract, but since then he has played in a total of 19 games over a period of four months and also secured a new contract, until the summer of 2023.

== International career ==
On 15 March 2017, Androutsos was first called up to the Greece national team by Michael Skibbe for Greece's crucial qualifier against Belgium. On 15 May 2018, he made his debut in a 2–0 away loss in Seville against Saudi Arabia. On 6 May 2021, he scored his first goal for Greece, giving a 2–0 lead in a friendly against Norway sealing a 2–1 away win.

== Career statistics ==
=== Club ===
As of 26 August 2026

Appearances and goals by club, season and competition
Club	Season	League			Greek Cup		Europe		other		Total	
Club	Season	Division	Apps	Goals	Apps	Goals	Apps	Goals	Apps	Goals	Apps	Goals
Olympiacos	2016–17	Super League Greece	17	1	8	0	5	0	—		30	1
Olympiacos	2017–18	Super League Greece	11	0	5	0	2	0	—		18	0
Olympiacos	2018–19	Super League Greece	5	0	4	1	0	0	—		9	1
Olympiacos	2020–21	Super League Greece	19	1	6	1	4	0	—		29	2
Olympiacos	2021–22	Super League Greece	15	0	4	0	5	0	—		24	0
Olympiacos	2022–23	Super League Greece	7	1	3	0	1	0	—		11	1
Olympiacos	2024–25	Super League Greece	1	0	0	0	0	0	—		0	0
Olympiacos	Total		75	3	30	2	17	0	—		121	5
Atromitos (loan)	2019–20	Super League Greece	27	4	4	0	—		—		31	4
Olympiacos B	2021–22	Super League Greece 2	3	0	0	0	—		—		3	0
Olympiacos B	2023–24	Super League Greece 2	12	1	0	0	—		—		12	1
Olympiacos B	Total		15	1	0	0	0	0	—		15	1
VfL Osnabrück	2023–24	2. Bundesliga	7	0	0	0	—		—		7	0
OFI Crete F.C.	2024–25	Super League Greece	13	0	3	0	—		—		16	0
OFI Crete F.C.	2025–26	Super League Greece	29	3	8	0	—		1 (Note: Appearances in Greek Super Cup)	0	38	3
OFI Crete F.C.	2026–27	Super League Greece	1	0	0	0	1	0	1 (Note: Appearances in Greek Super Cup)	1	3	1
OFI Crete F.C.	Total		43	3	11	0	1	0	2	1	57	4
Career total			166	8	45	2	18	0	2	1	231	14

=== International ===
Scores and results list Greece's goal tally first, score column indicates score after each Androutsos goal.

List of international goals scored by Thanasis Androutsos
No.	Date	Venue	Opponent	Score	Result	Competition
1	6 June 2021	La Rosaleda Stadium, Málaga, Spain	Norway	2–0	2–1	Friendly

== Honours ==
Olympiacos

- Super League Greece: 2016–17, 2020–21, 2021–22

OFI

- Greek Cup: 2025–26
- Greek Super Cup: 2026
