= Thiago Nuss =

Argentine footballer (born 2001)

Personal information
- Full name: Thiago Thomas Nuss
- Date of birth: 2 February 2001 (age 25)
- Place of birth: Cañuelas, Argentina
- Height: 1.72 m (5 ft 8 in)
- Position: Winger

Team information
- Current team: OFI
- Number: 18

Youth career
- Deportivo Español

Senior career*
Years	Team	Apps	(Gls)
2019	Deportivo Español	23	(5)
2020–2025	Argentinos Juniors	54	(4)
2020	→ Atlético Rafaela (loan)	1	(0)
2024	→ Central Córdoba (loan)	12	(1)
2024–2025	→ OFI (loan)	26	(8)
2025–	OFI	31	(10)
- * Club domestic league appearances and goals as of 19 October 2026

Thiago Thomas Nuss (born 2 February 2001) is an Argentine professional footballer who plays as a winger for Super League Greece club OFI.

== Career ==
Nuss began his career with Deportivo Español. He was promoted into their senior squad midway through the 2018–19 season at the age of eighteen, making his professional bow during a Primera B Metropolitana loss to Acassuso on 23 February 2019. Two appearances later, Nuss scored their sole goal in a win over Flandria on 4 March. In the succeeding May, Nuss netted a brace in a 2–1 win versus Comunicaciones. Despite three goals in twelve matches, only one of which was as a starter, Nuss couldn't prevent Deportivo Español suffering relegation to Primera C Metropolitana.

In December 2019, Nuss joined Argentinos Juniors, signing a 3-year contract. In the first couple of months, Nuss turned out for Argentinos' reserve team. To gain some experience, he was loaned out to Atlético de Rafaela in September 2020 until the end of the year. Nuss didn't play a professional game for Argentinos until 2022.

== Career statistics ==
As of match played on 7 April 2026.

Appearances and goals by club, season and competition
Club	Season	League			Cup		Other		Total	
Club	Season	Division	Apps	Goals	Apps	Goals	Apps	Goals	Apps	Goals
Deportivo Español	2018–19	Primera B Metropolitana	12	3	0	0	—		12	3
Argentinos Juniors	2022	Argentine Primera División	32	4	1	0	—		33	4
Argentinos Juniors	2023	Argentine Primera División	22	0	1	0	4 (Note: Appearances in the Copa Libertadores)	0	27	0
Argentinos Juniors	Total		54	4	2	0	4	0	60	4
Central Córdoba SdE (loan)	2024	Argentine Primera División	12	1	0	0	—		12	1
OFI	2024–25	Super League Greece	26	8	7	4	—		33	12
OFI	2025–26	Super League Greece	25	7	8	3	1 (Note: Appearances in the Greek Super Cup)	0	34	10
Career total			117	23	17	7	5	0	139	30

== Honours ==
OFI

- Greek Cup: 2025–26
- Greek Super Cup: 2026
