= OFI Crete F.C. =

Greek football club

OFI
- Full name: Podosfairiki Anonymi Etaireia Omilos Filathlon Irakleiou
- Nickname: O Ómilos (The Club)
- Short name: OFI
- Founded: 25 November 1925; 100 years ago
- Ground: Pankritio Stadium
- Capacity: 26,240
- President: Michael Bousis
- Head coach: Christos Kontis
- League: Super League Greece
- 2025–26: Super League Greece, 7th of 14
- Website: oficretefc.com
Home colours	Away colours	Third colours

OFI Football Club (Greek: Ποδοσφαιρική Ανώνυμη Εταιρεία Όμιλος Φιλάθλων Ηρακλείου, romanized: Podosfairiki Anonymi Etaireia Omilos Filathlon Irakleiou, lit. 'Heraklion Sportsmen Club Football Anonymous Society'), commonly known as OFI Crete or simply OFI (Greek: ΟΦΗ, pronounced [ˈofi]; approximately "OH-fee"), is a Greek professional football club based in Heraklion, on the island of Crete.

OFI Crete are the most successful Cretan football club and the only club from the island to have participated in European competitions. Among clubs based outside the two major urban centres of Athens and Thessaloniki, it has recorded the highest number of appearances in the Greek first division, with 48 seasons as of 2024 since its top-flight debut in 1968–69. The club has won two Greek Cups, in 1986–87 and 2025–26, one Greek Super Cup in 2026, as well as the Balkans Cup in 1989, and has made seven appearances in UEFA competitions. These achievements make OFI one of the most prominent Greek clubs outside Athens and Thessaloniki.

== History ==
=== Foundation ===
OFI were founded in 25 of November 1925 by a group of Cretan athletes who trained together in Heraklion. They formed a new club named Omilos Filathlon Irakliou (acronym OFI), which translates as "Heraklion Sportsmen Club". The club aimed to compete in various athletic events and exhibitions. In its early years, most members were among its own founders.

=== The years before World War II (1925–1940) ===
The pre-war years posed significant challenges for Crete and Greece as a whole, making travel and participation in national tournaments difficult for OFI. As a result, the club primarily competed in local matches on the island, often facing other Heraklion-based teams. Although no official records survive, older supporters estimate that OFI played roughly 400 matches before the German occupation of Crete.

=== First participation in the National League (1945–1962) ===
Football competitions in Crete were suspended during World War II, with many OFI players joining the war effort; some lost their lives. After the war, Greece's “First Division” resumed but was dominated by Athens and Thessaloniki clubs, leaving little room for provincial teams like OFI.

OFI's squad in 1954

Because teams outside these major cities were required to progress through multiple preliminary stages, OFI—despite being Crete's leading side—initially failed to qualify for the national championship. In 1957–58, OFI finally succeeded by winning its preliminary group, but the club finished last in the National Championship. A more stable footing emerged in 1962 with the creation of the official Second Division, where OFI established a firmer presence in Greek football.

=== Attempts in the 2nd League (1962–1968) ===
In 1962–63 the official Greek 2nd division league was set up for first time. OFI was one of the teams that participated in the league and completed the season in 9th position. In 1963–64 and 1964–65, OFI finished in 3rd and 5th position respectively.

In 1965–66, OFI were the champions of the 2nd Division of Greek football and only one step away from promotion to the official 1st National Division of Greek football. Yet, the Hellenic Football Federation decided that even the champions of the 2nd Division had to play preliminary games in order to be promoted.

OFI lost in the play-off matches and remained in the 2nd Division. In 1966–67 the disappointment was huge, even though OFI ended in 3rd position. Everyone on the island of Crete was feeling that the moment where they could see the pride of their island in the top league was very close. In 1967–68, OFI finished in 2nd position and went into play-off games with the bottom team of the 1st division. The final match of the play-offs was to take place in the city of Chania, on 26 June 1968. OFI, with the help of 10,000 Cretans thrashed the team from the 1st division with a 3–0 win and made the dreams of thousands of supporters come true. OFI was an official member of the 1st National Division.

=== Debut in the 1st League (1968–1971) ===
OFI's debut in the national 1st division was very difficult. "Omilos" ended the first round in 15th position. It was a difficult task to remain in the league. However, in the 2nd round the Cretans played magnificently and finally finished in 12th place. In the next season OFI had already gained the experience of playing in the top league of Greek football. The "Snakes" finished in 13th place, but the strange thing was that OFI remained unbeaten in almost all of their home games in Heraklion. Only two teams managed to survive and leave Crete with an away win. Thus, even if OFI was not a feared opponent, all the other teams were anxious when taking the trip to the island of Crete.

1970–71 was the worst season the team from Heraklion ever had in the 1st Division. OFI ended in 17th position and were relegated for the last time in their history to the 2nd division. The whole season was a tragedy for the Cretans. OFI had to meet "old friends" from the 2nd division again and start battling again in order to be promoted for a second time.

=== Back to the 2nd League (1971–1976) ===
OFI had been relegated again, but this time the 2nd division had changed entirely. After all, the championship had been more officially organized and opponents were tougher than before.

OFI spent another 5 seasons in the 2nd division, from 1971–72 to 1975–76. During the first season, the team was continually in 1st place.

However, at the end of the season, OFI's good performances deteriorated and they finally finished 4th. In 1972–73 the management decided on a complete overhaul of the squad. In these circumstances, the 13th position OFI achieved was predictable, yet a new era of the stars of OFI had just begun. In the next season OFI finished 6th and in 1974–75 they finished 5th. In the next season the league was divided again into two groups, each of 20 teams. The champions of each group would be promoted directly to the First National Division. OFI couldn't afford to miss this chance. Everything started perfectly for "Omilos" in 1975–76. They finished 1st at the end of the first round with a huge lead over the runners-up and then finished the season as champions. The whole island of Crete was celebrating the promotion of OFI to the 1st division.

=== Vardinoyiannis Era (1980s) ===
During the late 1970s, OFI Crete established itself as a competitive team in the Greek 1st Division. In the 1976–77 season, despite being new to the top flight, OFI finished in 6th place, gaining national attention. Dimitris Papadopoulos emerged as the league's top scorer that year. The club continued to perform respectably over the next two seasons, finishing 8th and 7th respectively. During this period, OFI remained unbeaten at home, including against league heavyweights like Panathinaikos, Olympiacos, AEK, and PAOK, who found it challenging to secure points when visiting Crete.

The transformation of Greek football into a professional competition in the 1979–80 season coincided with the arrival of the Vardinoyiannis family as majority shareholders of OFI. Under the leadership of Theodoros Vardinoyiannis, the club entered a new era. In their first professional season, OFI finished 11th, with their only home loss being to Panathinaikos.

From the early 1980s, Panathinaikos began to send young players to OFI as part of a strategic collaboration. This led to mixed results, as the influx of inexperienced players contributed to OFI's struggles in the 1980–81 season, where they finished in 13th place. The subsequent seasons saw gradual improvement, with the team finishing 9th in 1981–82 and 7th in 1982–83.

Thus, in 1983–84, three goalkeepers, one midfielder, and one defender came from Panathinaikos to OFI. Among these players were Nikos Nioplias and Vangelis Chosadas, who became key contributors to the team. However, the strategy of relying on young, untested players continued to yield inconsistent results, and OFI finished in 8th place that season. Despite these challenges, the team began to develop a more cohesive unit, laying the groundwork for future success.

The following season, OFI's fortunes improved under a new coach, who managed to harness the potential of the team, turning them into a more competitive force in the Greek league.

==== Gerards' years (1985–2000) ====
In 1985, OFI appointed Dutch coach Eugène Gerards, marking the beginning of a 15-year tenure. This remains the longest coaching stint in the history of the Greek League. In 1985–86, OFI finished 2nd in the league, missing out on the championship by five points. The team followed this up with a 3rd-place finish in 1986–87 and 4th in 1987–88.

On 21 June 1987, Gerards led OFI to the Greek Cup by defeating Iraklis 3–1 on penalties at the Olympic Stadium in Athens.

In the 1987–88 season, OFI finished above Panathinaikos for the first time, including a 2–1 win over them in Heraklion, with a last-minute goal by Stefanos Vavoulas. During this era, OFI also participated in European competitions such as the UEFA Cup in 1986 and the UEFA Cup Winners' Cup in 1987.

On 7 June 1989, OFI won the Balkans Cup after defeating FK Radnički Niš 3–1 in Serres.

In the following seasons (1989–1992), OFI finished 6th, 7th, and 6th. On 27 May 1990, OFI overturned a 4–0 deficit against Olympiacos at Karaiskakis Stadium to win 4–5.

In 1992–93, OFI finished 4th in the league and qualified for the UEFA Cup, where they eliminated Slavia Prague and Atlético Madrid before being knocked out by Boavista. Despite this European run, OFI finished 7th in the 1993–94 Championship.

In 1996–97, OFI finished 3rd and qualified for the UEFA Cup again, with four of its players called up to the Greek national team. The season ended with a 2–1 victory over Panathinaikos, leaving them outside the European qualification spots.

In 2000, after 15 years, Gerards announced his retirement from the OFI bench, capping an era that saw the club consistently rank among Greece's elite teams. This would be the last time OFI qualified for European competition for the next 20 years, until their return in the 2019–20 season.

=== A Period of Transition and Resilience (2000–2009) ===
The early 21st century was a time of transition for OFI, as the club navigated a series of challenges while maintaining its position in the Greek Super League. The retirement of key players such as Nioplias and Machlas led to a period of rebuilding, with the team making adjustments to its roster and management. Although 2001 proved to be a difficult year, with OFI fighting to remain in the 1st League, the following seasons saw gradual improvement, as the club managed to secure safety from relegation with increasing consistency.

President Fanouris Vatsinas appointed German Reiner Maurer as coach in the summer of 2006. Maurer revitalized the team's style of play, and for the first time since the Gerards era, OFI was in contention for a European spot. The club even participated in the Intertoto Cup in the summer of 2007. Although they did not advance far, this marked an important achievement for the club. However, the 2007–08 season proved to be another test, and after a difficult campaign, Maurer was replaced by Georgios Paraschos, and later by Czech coach František Straka.

In 2009, OFI faced further challenges, including leadership changes and financial difficulties. The fans called for President Vatsinas to step down, and former player Machlas expressed his interest in purchasing the club, offering significant financial support. Despite efforts to turn the season around, Straka was dismissed, and Ioannis Matzourakis was brought in. However, OFI was ultimately relegated to the second division after finishing 16th in the 2008–09 season.

Despite these setbacks, OFI has shown resilience. Following the season, some senior players filed claims over unpaid wages, leading to their departure, but the club remained determined to rebuild and return to its former standing.

=== Rebuilding and Revival (2009−2018) ===
After a challenging period, OFI returned to the Super League in 2011 under a new administration led by former OFI legend Nikos Machlas. The club achieved an impressive 6th-place finish in the 2013−14 season, showcasing the team's potential. However, significant financial difficulties, with debts amounting to around €12 million, hindered further success. During the 2014–15 season, the club fell behind in the league standings, and on 21 March 2015, OFI withdrew from professional competitions due to the administration's inability to meet financial obligations. In a touching moment, the 15 remaining players took to the pitch at Theodoros Vardinogiannis Stadium to bid farewell to OFI's loyal fans. After 47 consecutive years in professional competitions, OFI was relegated to amateur status.

In response, the professional football department merged with its parent sports club, and a new leadership took over, initiating a fresh start. This allowed OFI to compete in the amateur Gamma Ethniki (third tier) under a new administration, free from the financial burdens of the past. OFI quickly bounced back, securing promotion after winning the 2015−16 Gamma Ethniki title. After two successful seasons in the Football League, OFI reclaimed its place in the Super League as 2017−18 Second Division champions, alongside historic rivals Aris Thessaloniki.

=== The Bousis era, cup triumph and return to Europe (2018–present) ===
On 4 October 2018, the Professional Sports Committee of Greece approved Michael Bousis as the new major shareholder of OFI. On 10 October, he formally assumed control of the club's administration during a press conference in Heraklion.

In April 2019, Angelo P. Palivos, his brother Gregory Palivos, and their mother Vassiliki Tyrvolis Palivos acquired ownership and control of 36.4% of the club's shares. Angelo and Gregory Palivos also served on the club's Board of Directors on behalf of the Palivos family of Las Vegas, Nevada, and Chicago, Illinois. On 22 June 2020, Bousis bought out the Palivos family's shares and again became the club's majority owner. On the same day, Angelo and Gregory Palivos resigned from the Board of Directors.

The Bousis administration also sought to modernise OFI's institutional and commercial identity. In August 2020, the club presented a new crest, replacing the traditional shield-based design with a circular emblem centred on the Greek letters ΟΦΗ. The redesign retained the club's black-and-white colour identity while introducing a more distinctive visual mark associated with the club's new era.

On 17 May 2021, Bousis announced Minas Lysandrou as the club's new CEO. Lysandrou had previously served as CEO of AEK Athens F.C. until 31 March 2021. His collaboration with OFI ended in May 2025, after four years at the club, and later that month AEK announced his return as A Vice President and CEO.

Under Bousis's ownership, OFI initially avoided relegation in the 2018-19 season through the play-offs. The following season, the club improved significantly, entering the championship play-offs and qualifying for European competition for the first time in 20 years. OFI competed in the 2020-21 UEFA Europa League qualifying rounds, where it was eliminated by Apollon Limassol.

The club's league results in the following seasons were mixed, but OFI remained in the Super League. It finished 12th in 2020-21, 8th in 2021-22, 7th in 2022-23 after topping the playout group, 10th in 2023-24, and 8th in 2024-25.

The most significant sporting achievement of the Bousis era came in the 2025–26 season, when OFI won the Greek Cup for the second time in its history, defeating PAOK 3–2 after extra time in the final at the Panthessaliko Stadium in Volos. The victory was the club's first major trophy since its 1986–87 Greek Cup triumph and secured OFI entry into the 2026–27 UEFA Europa League play-off round. It also guaranteed the club a place in the league phase of a UEFA competition, either in the Europa League or, if eliminated from the Europa League play-off round, in the UEFA Conference League.

== Crest and colours ==
=== Crest ===
OFI's traditional crest has been a significant symbol of the club since its foundation in 1925, undergoing several variations over the years. The original crest featured a white shield with a black outline and a diagonal black ribbon containing the club's acronym "ΟΦΗ" in white Greek letters, read from the bottom left to the top right of the crest. In 2016, as part of the club's re-entry into professional competitions after its dissolution the year before, the club's foundation date «1925» was added to the crest, and the outline was significantly thickened to create a substantial visual change from the logo of the bankrupt, liquidated forerunner club.

On August 7, 2020, the club's new administration introduced a new crest, replacing the traditional shield with a circle. The new emblem features the Greek letters "ΟΦΗ" at the center of the circle. According to the club's press release, this design shift represents unity, strength, authenticity, and pride. The perfect circle symbolizes a complete world, a new football ethos, and the vision of the people of OFI for the team and the island of Crete. The design was inspired by the lines of a football field as seen from above, with the letters O and H corresponding to the two penalty areas, and the letter Φ representing the center of the pitch.

1925-1980

1980–2016 (variations)

2016–2020

2020 - Present

=== Colours ===
The colours that OFI has used since its foundation are black and white. Black is a traditional color worn by Cretan men, reflecting the island's heritage. Additionally, no other sports club in Crete had the same colour combination at the time. These colours have become synonymous with the club's identity, representing its heritage and values.

Sponsorships:

- Great Shirt Sponsor and big sponsor: Betsson
- Official Sport Clothing Manufacturer: Puma
- Golden Sponsor: AVIS

== Stadium ==
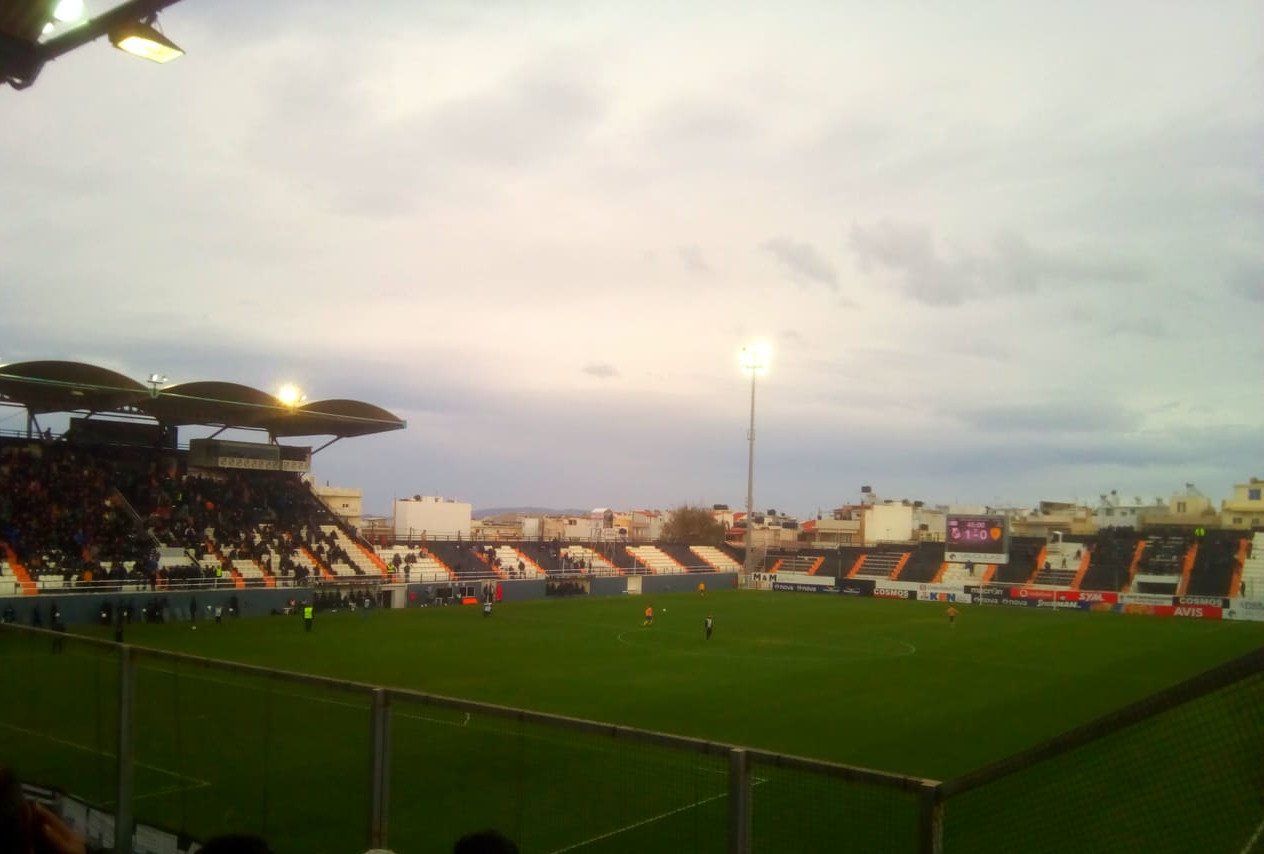
Theodoros Vardinogiannis Stadium

OFI's home ground is the Theodoros Vardinogiannis Stadium, located in Heraklion, Crete, Greece. Originally built in 1951, it has since undergone several renovations. The stadium is popularly known by its nickname "Yedi Kule," a reference to the famous Heptapyrgion (also known as "Yedi Kule" in Ottoman Turkish)—a Byzantine and Ottoman-era fortress located in the Acropolis of Thessaloniki, Greece.

After the death of OFI's iconic leader, the stadium was officially named after Theodoros Vardinogiannis. The inaugural match took place on 11 November 1951, with OFI playing against the team of A.S.D.A.N. (similar to the current national team), resulting in a 4–1 defeat for OFI. Despite the loss, the event was historic, as OFI had finally acquired a permanent "home" to host its loyal fans and support the growing football culture in Heraklion. The stadium was built on the site of former Christian, Jewish and Armenian cemeteries, and the pitch area still contains remnants of large gun emplacements from the World War II occupation by German forces.

The highest recorded attendance at Yedi Kule was 12,391 spectators during a match between OFI and Olympiacos on 25 September 1988, which OFI won 2–1.

Starting from the 2025–26 season, OFI will play its home matches at the Pankritio Stadium, as the historical stadium can no longer be licensed for official use due to structural safety concerns, therefore it no longer meets the necessary standards for accommodating spectators.

== Supporters ==
OFI has a big fan base in Crete. Most popular organized fan clubs are the "Snakes 4 Heraklion club" and "S.F Cretans 4 T. Papadopoulos". OFI (ΟΦΗ) is a homophone of the Greek root ophi- (οφι-), meaning "serpent", from which the supporters' nickname "Snakes" derives.

OFI fans have good relations with the fans of PAOK, a friendship that started in October 1987 when OFI faced Atalanta for 1987–88 Cup Winners' Cup at Toumba Stadium and numerous PAOK fans supported the Cretans.

== Rivalries ==
=== Rivalry with Ergotelis ===
OFI has a long-standing rivalry with local side Ergotelis, often referred to as the "Cretan derby." The rivalry dates back to 1929 when the first-ever match between the two sides, a friendly, ended in chaos. The game, held in August 1929, was abandoned after just 35 minutes due to a violent clash between players. At that time, Ergotelis were leading by one goal.

The rivalry intensified under the Greek military junta of 1967–1974, when new legislation mandated that every regional Greek city should be represented by just one football team. At that time, both OFI and Ergotelis were competing in the Second National Division (Football League). After the 1966–67 season, Ergotelis finished 8th, while OFI placed higher in the standings, resulting in Ergotelis' relegation. The legislation also allowed the remaining second-division teams to sign players from relegated clubs, which led to five key Ergotelis players transferring to OFI. This marked the beginning of a prolonged period where Ergotelis languished in the lower leagues.

The rivalry, however, softened in the early 2000s when Ergotelis made their return to top-flight football. In a display of solidarity, OFI fans attended Ergotelis' games during their debut season in the Super League. Further evidence of improving relations came when Ergotelis loaned their legendary scorer, Patrick Ogunsoto, to a financially struggling OFI in the Beta Ethniki (second division) for no fee, to help the club in its bid to return to the Super League.

== Honours ==
OFI Crete F.C. honours oficretefc.com
Type	Competition	Titles	Winners	Runners-up
Continental	Balkans Cup	1	1988–89	
Domestic	Football League	3	1965–66, 1975–76, 2017–18	
Domestic	Gamma Ethniki	1	2015–16	
Domestic	Greek Cup	2	1986–87, 2025–26	1989–90, 2024–25
Domestic	Greek Super Cup	1	2026	1987, 2025
Regional	Heraklion FCA Championship	18	1927−28, 1928−29, 1930−31, 1931−32, 1932−33, 1934−35, 1947−48, 1948−49, 1951−52, 1953−54, 1954−55, 1955−56, 1956−57, 1957−58, 1958−59, 1959−60, 1960−61, 1961−62	

- record
- ^{S} Shared record

== Seasons in the Super League era ==
Season	Category	Position	Cup
2000–01	Alpha Ethniki	12th	GS
2001–02	Alpha Ethniki	8th	R16
2002–03	Alpha Ethniki	8th	R16
2003–04	Alpha Ethniki	11th	R16
2004–05	Alpha Ethniki	13th	R16
2005–06	Alpha Ethniki	13th	4R
2006–07	Super League	7th	5R
2007–08	Super League	12th	QF
2008–09	Super League	14th	5R
2009–10	Beta Ethniki	3rd	5R
2010–11	Football League	3rd	4R
2011–12	Super League	10th	SF
2012–13	Super League	14th	3R
2013–14	Super League	**6th**	SF
2014–15	Super League	16th	QF
2015–16	Gamma Ethniki (Group 4)	1st	-
2016–17	Football League	4th	R16
2017–18	Football League	1st	R16
2018–19	Super League	13th	R16
2019–20	Super League	**6th**	R16
2020–21	Super League	12th	1R
2021–22	Super League	8th	R16
2022–23	Super League	7th	5R
2023–24	Super League	10th	QF
2024–25	Super League	8th	RU
2025–26	Super League	7th	**W**

Best position in bold.

Key: 1R = First Round, 3R = Third Round, 4R = Fourth Round, 5R = Fifth Round, GS = Group Stage, R16 = Round of 16, QF = Quarter-finals, SF = Semi-finals, RU = Runner-up, W = Winner.

== Players ==
=== Current squad ===
As of 11 September 2026

Note: Flags indicate national team as defined under FIFA eligibility rules; some limited exceptions apply. Players may hold more than one non-FIFA nationality.

No.	Pos.	Nation	Player
1	GK	ALB	Klidman Lilo
2	DF	CRO	Krešimir Krizmanić
3	DF	GRE	Nikos Athanasiou (on loan from Olympiacos)
4	DF	GRE	Nikos Marinakis
5	DF	GRE	Konstantinos Kostoulas
6	MF	GRE	Zisis Karachalios
7	MF	GRE	Anastasios Chatzigiovanis
8	MF	GRE	Georgios Kanellopoulos
9	FW	BEL	Aaron Leya Iseka
10	MF	ESP	Aitor Cantalapiedra
11	FW	GRE	Taxiarchis Fountas
13	GK	GRE	Panagiotis Katsikas
14	MF	GRE	Thanasis Androutsos (captain)
15	DF	GRE	Achilleas Poungouras
16	DF	CYP	Christos Sielis

No.	Pos.	Nation	Player
17	DF	ESP	Borja González
18	MF	ARG	Thiago Nuss
19	FW	BIH	Kenan Kodro (on loan from Ferencváros)
21	MF	GRE	Giannis Apostolakis
23	GK	BEL	Manuel Kalafatis
24	DF	ITA	Lorenzo Dickmann
30	MF	ARG	Thiago Romano
31	GK	GRE	Nikos Christogeorgos
41	MF	GRE	Andreas Bouchalakis
43	DF	GRE	Dimitrios Nikolaou (on loan from Palermo)
46	FW	GRE	Giannis Theodosoulakis
52	DF	GRE	Konstantinos Lagoudakis
71	MF	GRE	Athanasios Sitmalidis
90	DF	GRE	Pavlos Kenourgiakis
91	MF	GRE	Emmanouil Chnaris

=== Out on loan ===
Note: Flags indicate national team as defined under FIFA eligibility rules; some limited exceptions apply. Players may hold more than one non-FIFA nationality.

No.	Pos.	Nation	Player
—	MF	GRE	Manolis Faitakis (at Athens Kallithea until 30 June 2027)

== Personnel ==
=== Ownership and current staff ===
Position	Staff
Owner and president	(Greece) (United States) Michael Bousis
Vice president	(Greece) Ilias Poursanidis
Commercial Manager	(Greece) Nontas Kargakis
Legal Counsel	(Greece) Iasonas Papastefanakis
Football Admin	(Greece) Theano Rasouli
Team Manager	(Greece) Savvas Tsabouris
Player Liaison	(Greece) Pavlos Adamos
Head of Scouting	(Greece) Christos Papantonopoulos
Communication Director	(Greece) Manolis Vogiatzakis
TMS and game operations	(Greece) Antonis Chronakis

=== Coaching staff ===
Position	Staff
Head coach	(Greece) Christos Kontis
Assistant head coach	(Greece) Alexandros Tziolis
Fitness coach	(Greece) Nikos Koundourakis (Cyprus) Efthymios Kyprianou
Goalkeeper coach	(Greece) Dionysis Chiotis
Analyst	(Greece) Dimos Christofis

=== Medical staff ===
Position	Staff
Medical Director	(Greece) Georgios Kouvidis
Doctor	(Greece) Charis Christoforidis (Greece) Elena Drakonaki
Head of Rehabilitation	(Greece) Giannis Stathas
Physiotherapists	(Greece) Giannis Rompogiannakis (Greece) Markos Miglis (Greece) Nikos Karemfyllakis
Masseur	(Greece) Leonidas Sakoutis

== European record ==
Season	Competition	Round	Club	Home	Away
1986–87	UEFA Cup	1st Round	(Socialist Federal Republic of Yugoslavia) Hajduk Split	1–0	0–4
1987–88	Cup Winners' Cup	1st Round	(Bulgaria) Vitosha Sofia	3–1	0–1
1987–88	Cup Winners' Cup	2nd Round	(Italy) Atalanta	1–0	0–2
1993–94	UEFA Cup	1st Round	(Czech Republic) Slavia Prague	1–0	1–1
1993–94	UEFA Cup	2nd Round	(Spain) Atlético Madrid	2–0	0–1
1993–94	UEFA Cup	3rd Round	(Portugal) Boavista	1–4	0–2
1995–96	Intertoto Cup	Group stage (Group 7)	(Cyprus) Nea Salamina	2–1	
1995–96	Intertoto Cup	Group stage (Group 7)	(Germany) Bayer Leverkusen		0–1
1995–96	Intertoto Cup	Group stage (Group 7)	(Estonia) Tervis Pärnu	2–0	
1995–96	Intertoto Cup	Group stage (Group 7)	(Serbia and Montenegro) Budućnost		4–3
1995–96	Intertoto Cup	2nd Round	(Turkey) Bursaspor		1–2
1997–98	UEFA Cup	2nd Qual. Round	(Iceland) KR Reykjavík	3–1	0–0
1997–98	UEFA Cup	1st Round	(Hungary) Ferencváros	3–0	1–2
1997–98	UEFA Cup	2nd Round	(France) Auxerre	3–2	1–3
2000–01	UEFA Cup	1st Round	(Serbia and Montenegro) Napredak	6–0	0–0
2000–01	UEFA Cup	2nd Round	(Czech Republic) Slavia Prague	2–2	1–4
2007–08	Intertoto Cup	3rd Round	(Kazakhstan) Tobol	0–1	0–1
2020–21	UEFA Europa League	2nd Qual. Round	(Cyprus) Apollon Limassol	0–1	—N/a
2026–27	UEFA Europa League	Play-off Round	(Bulgaria) CSKA Sofia	3–0	2–0
2026–27	UEFA Europa League	League phase	(Germany) Bayer Leverkusen	0–2	—N/a
2026–27	UEFA Europa League	League phase	(Portugal) Benfica	—N/a	—
2026–27	UEFA Europa League	League phase	(Belgium) Anderlecht	—	—N/a
2026–27	UEFA Europa League	League phase	(France) Rennes	—N/a	1–2
2026–27	UEFA Europa League	League phase	(Austria) Sturm Graz	—N/a	—
2026–27	UEFA Europa League	League phase	(Poland) Lech Poznań	—	—N/a
2026–27	UEFA Europa League	League phase	(Germany) TSG Hoffenheim	2–0	—N/a
2026–27	UEFA Europa League	League phase	(Israel) Hapoel Be'er Sheva	—N/a	2–0

== Managerial history ==
- (Greece) Stratos (1946)
- (Greece) Kostas Zogas (1958)
- (Greece) Mantalopoulos (1959)
- (Greece) Vaggelis Helmis (1965–66)
- (Greece) Petritsis (1967–68)
- (Greece) Kostas Zogas (1967–68)
- (Socialist Federal Republic of Yugoslavia) Domagoj Kapetanović (1968–71)
- (Greece) Giorgos Stratakis (1970–71)
- (Greece) Thanasis Soulis (1971–72)
- (Greece) Giorgos Stratakis (1971–72)
- (Greece) Takis Papartheniou (1972–73)
- (Greece) Kostas Karapatis & (Greece) Manolis Tzanis (1973–74)
- (Greece) Thanasis Zafeiropoulos (1975–76)
- (Greece) Nikos Alefantos (1976–77) & (Czechoslovakia) František Fadrhonc (1978)
- (Greece) Antonis Georgiadis (1978–30 June 1980)
- (England) Les Shannon (1979–80)
- (Greece) Nikos Alefantos (1981–82)
- (Greece) Giorgos Stratakis (1981–82)
- (England) Les Shannon (1982–84)
- (Greece) Manolis Tzanis & (Greece) Aris Vasileiou (1984)
- (Greece) Lakis Petropoulos (1984–85)
- (Greece) Giannis Parasidis (1984–85)
- (Czech Republic) Petr Packert (1984–85)
- (England) Mike Bailey (1984–85)
- (Netherlands) Eugène Gerards (23 June 1985 – 20 Nov 2000)
- (Greece) Aris Vasileiou (2000)
- (Greece) Giannis Samaras (2000–02)
- (Czech Republic) Zdeněk Ščasný (1 July 2002 – 15 Nov 2003)
- (Greece) Georgios Firos (26 Nov 2003 – 30 June 2004)
- (Greece) Giannis Chatzinikolaou (1 July 2004 – 30 June 2005)
- (Greece) Vangelis Vlachos (1 July 2005 – 13 Feb 2006)
- (Greece) Myron Sifakis (14 Feb 2006 – 30 June 2006)
- (Germany) Reiner Maurer (1 July 2006 – 12 Nov 2007)
- (Greece) Georgios Paraschos (16 Nov 2007 – 30 June 2008)
- (Czech Republic) František Straka (1 July 2008 – 11 Oct 2008)
- (Greece) Ioannis Matzourakis (12 Oct 2008 – 15 May 2009)
- (Greece) Georgios Paraschos (2009)
- (Cyprus) Nikodimos Papavasiliou & (Greece) Myron Sifakis (1 July 2009 – 2 Nov 2009)
- (Greece) Nikos Goulis (5 Nov 2009 – 30 June 2010)
- (Greece) Giannis Chatzinikolaou (1 July 2010 – 28 Sept 2010)
- (Greece) Nikos Anastopoulos (28 Sept 2010 – 29 Dec 2012)
- (Greece) Giannis Petrakis (2 Jan 2013 – 10 May 2013)
- (Greece) Pavlos Dermitzakis (16 May 2013 – 7 Oct 2013)
- (Portugal) Ricardo Sá Pinto (18 Oct 2013 – 25 May 2014)
- (Italy) Gennaro Gattuso (5 June 2014 – 30 Dec 2014)
- (Greece) Nikos Anastopoulos (1 Jan 2015 – 21 Mar 2015)
- (Armenia) Murat Seropian (1 July 2015 – 29 Sept 2015)
- (Greece) Nikos Goulis (7 Oct 2015 – 7 Jan 2016)
- (Greece) Nikos Nioplias (21 Jan 2016 – 21 Jan 2017)
- (Greece) Nikos Papadopoulos (24 Jan 2017 – 21 Jan 2019)
- (Chile) Jaime Vera (25 Jan 2019 – 29 June 2019)
- (Greece) Georgios Simos (12 July 2019 – 6 March 2021)
- (Greece) Nikos Nioplias (6 March 2021 – 21 October 2022)
- (Lithuania) Valdas Dambrauskas (25 October 2022 – 9 December 2023)
- (Spain) Pepe Mel (14 December 2023 – 11 February 2024)
- (Greece) Traianos Dellas (14 February 2024 – 11 October 2024)
- (Serbia) Milan Rastavac (13 October 2024 – 26 October 2025)
- (Greece) Christos Kontis (26 October 2025 – present)

== Records and statistics ==
=== Most appearances and top scorers ===
Most appearances:

Rank	Name	Apps
1	(Greece) Nikos Nioplias	416
2	(Greece) Petros Marinakis	258
3	(Greece) Kostas Chaniotakis	255
4	(Greece) Manolis Patemtzis	250
5	(Greece) Nikos Goulis	249

Top scorers:

Rank	Name	Goals
1	(Greece) Nikos Machlas & Nikos Nioplias	73
2	(Greece) Georgios Vlastos	55
3	(Costa Rica) Rónald Gómez	52
4	(Greece) Dimitrios Papadopoulos	49
5	(Greece) Thalis Tsirimokos & Dimitrios Manos	40

== See also ==
- O.F.I. (sports club)
