= Nikos Christogeorgos =

Greek association football player

Personal information
- Full name: Nikolaos Christogeorgos
- Date of birth: 3 January 2000 (age 26)
- Place of birth: Athens, Greece
- Height: 1.90 m (6 ft 3 in)
- Position: Goalkeeper

Team information
- Current team: OFI
- Number: 31

Youth career
- 2016–2018: Panathinaikos

Senior career*
Years	Team	Apps	(Gls)
2018–2023	Panathinaikos	2	(0)
2021–2023	Panathinaikos B	20	(0)
2023–	OFI	62	(0)

International career^{‡}
2018	Greece U19	3	(0)
2021	Greece U21	1	(0)
- * Club domestic league appearances and goals as of 20 October 2026 ‡ National team caps and goals as of 3 September 2021

Nikos Christogeorgos (Greek: Νίκος Χριστογεώργος; born 3 January 2000) is a Greek professional footballer who plays as a goalkeeper for Super League club OFI.

== Career ==
=== Panathinaikos ===
Christogeorgos plays mainly as a goalkeeper and joined Panathinaikos from the team's youth ranks.

On 9 April 2021, he signed a new contract, running until the summer of 2024.

=== OFI ===
On 31 January 2023, Christogeorgos joined OFI on a deal running until the summer of 2026.

== Career statistics ==
As of 9 September 2023

Club	Season	League			Cup		Continental		Other		Total	
Club	Season	Division	Apps	Goals	Apps	Goals	Apps	Goals	Apps	Goals	Apps	Goals
Panathinaikos	2019–20	Super League Greece	1	0	0	0	—		—		1	0
Panathinaikos	2020–21	Super League Greece	1	0	0	0	—		—		1	0
Panathinaikos	Total		2	0	0	0	—		—		2	0
Panathinaikos B	2021–22	Super League Greece 2	17	0	—		—		—		17	0
Panathinaikos B	2022–23	Super League Greece 2	3	0	—		—		—		3	0
Panathinaikos B	Total		20	0	—		—		—		20	0
OFI	2022–23	Super League Greece	1	0	—		—		—		1	0
OFI	2023–24	Super League Greece	7	0	0	0	—		—		7	0
OFI	Total		8	0	0	0	0	0	—		8	0
Career total			30	0	0	0	0	0	0	0	30	0

== Honours ==
OFI

- Greek Cup: 2025–26
- Greek Super Cup: 2026
