= 2025–26 Greek Football Cup =

2025–26 Greek Cup
Betsson Greek Cup

Tournament details
- Country: Greece
- Teams: 31

Final positions
- Champions: OFI (2nd title)
- Runners-up: PAOK

Tournament statistics
- Matches played: 64
- Goals scored: 172 (2.69 per match)
- Top goal scorer(s): Jorge Aguirre; Said Hamulić; Jasin-Amin Assehnoun; Roman Yaremchuk; Yusuf Yazıcı; Anastasios Bakasetas (4 goals each)

The 2025–26 Greek Football Cup, also named Betsson Greek Cup for sponsorship reasons, was the 84th edition of the Greek Football Cup. The winners, OFI, qualified for the 2026–27 UEFA Europa League play-off round, as well as the next season's Greek Super Cup.

The teams of the 2 professional national leagues, Super League 1 and Super League 2, participated, while the cup winners of the Local FCAs optionally and the teams of Gamma Ethniki, compulsorily, participated in the Amateur Cup, which was reinstated.

The competition began on 18 August 2025 with the qualifying round, which included the Super League 2 teams, the teams that took places 9 to 12 in the previous season's Super League 1, and the two teams that won promotion to the Super League 1 from Super League 2, in the 2024–25 season, and concluded with the final on 25 April 2026, where OFI secured their second title in their 101 year presence.

In addition, extra time was abolished in matches up to the semi-finals, while each team was required to have at least one Greek player born in 2004 or later in the starting lineup and in the whole game.

This year's competition was the first implementation of a new conducting system, which included a qualifying round, league phase, play-offs, quarter-finals, semi-finals and final, adapting the format of the competition to the UEFA standards.

Olympiacos were the defending champions having won the 2024–25 edition of this cup.

== Calendar ==
Round	Main date(s)	Fixtures	Clubs	New entries
Qualifying round	18, 19, 20 August 2025	11	23 → 12	23
League phase	16, 17, 23–25 September, 28, 29 October & 2–4, 17 December 2025	40	20 → 8	8
Play-offs	6, 7, 8 January 2026	4	8 → 4	0
Quarter-finals	13, 14, 15 January 2026	4	8 → 4	0
Semi-finals	2, 12 February 2026	4	4 → 2	0
Final	25 April 2026	1	2 → 1	0

Source: epo.gr

== Qualifying round ==
The draw for the qualifying round took place on 4 August 2025.

The 4 Super League 1 teams that finished in positions 9 to 12 the previous season, the 2 teams promoted from Super League 2 to Super League 1 from the previous season and the 17 teams participating in this year's Super League 2, with the exception of the B teams, participated in the qualifying round of the competition. The 11 teams that qualified, along with the 1 team that qualified without a match from the draw, advanced to the league phase of the competition.

=== Summary ===
Team 1	Score	Team 2
18 August 2025
Niki Volos	1–2	Panetolikos
Makedonikos	1–2	Levadiakos
19 August 2025
PAS Giannina	0–4	Volos
Kavala	1–1 (5–4 p)	Panserraikos
Kalamata	1–2	AEL
Anagennisi Karditsa	1–1 (2–3 p)	A.E. Kifisia
Egaleo	1–1 (6–5 p)	Panargiakos
20 August 2025
Kampaniakos	0–1	Athens Kallithea
Hellas Syros	1–0	Nestos Chrysoupoli
Chania	0–1	Marko
Panionios	1–1 (2–3 p)	Iraklis
N/A
Ilioupoli	bye	

=== Matches ===
18 August 2025
17:00 EEST

Niki Volos	1–2	Panetolikos
Lolis 76'	Report	Luís 18'; Aguirre 90+7'

Pantelis Magoulas Stadium, Volos
Referee: Athanasios Tzilos (Larissa)

18 August 2025
17:00 EEST

Makedonikos	1–2	Levadiakos
Nikos 90'	Report	Layous 78'; Liagas 86'

Makedonikos Stadium, Thessaloniki
Referee: Fotis Polychronis (Pieria)

19 August 2025
17:00 EEST

PAS Giannina	0–4	Volos
	Report	Comba 7'; Legisi 10'; Hamulić 75'; Joca 79'

Zosimades Stadium, Ioannina
Referee: Meletis Gioumatzidis (Pella)

19 August 2025
17:00 EEST

Kavala	1–1 (a.e.t.)	Panserraikos
Bregu 90+2'	Report	Ivan 71' (pen.)
Penalties
Sifneos (penalty scored); Gavriilidis (penalty scored); Katsoulidis (penalty scored); Bregu (penalty scored); Aliatidis (penalty missed); Stamoulis (penalty scored)	5–4	(penalty scored) Green; (penalty missed) Oméonga; (penalty scored) De Marco; (penalty scored) Volnei; (penalty scored) Lyratzis; (penalty missed) Tsaousis

Anthi Karagianni Stadium, Kavala
Referee: Panagiotis Koukoulas (Lesbos)

19 August 2025
17:00 EEST

Kalamata	1–2	AEL
Pamlidis 33'	Report	Chakla 53'; Mourgos 77'

Kalamata Municipal Stadium, Kalamata
Referee: Konstantinos Katikos (Athens)

19 August 2025
17:00 EEST

Anagennisi Karditsa	1–1 (a.e.t.)	A.E. Kifisia
Zygeridis 39'	Report	Tetteh 79' (pen.)
Penalties
Moustakopoulos (penalty scored); Nikokyrakis (penalty scored); Nikolias (penalty missed); Bousis (penalty missed); Andreou + (penalty missed)	2–3	(penalty scored) Manalis; (penalty missed) Rubén Pérez; (penalty scored) Chouchoumis; (penalty missed) Esquivel; (penalty scored) Tetteh

Municipal Stadium of Karditsa, Karditsa
Referee: Georgios Kokkinos (Chalkidiki)

19 August 2025
17:00 EEST

Egaleo	1–1 (a.e.t.)	Panargiakos
Varkas 76'	Report	Voriazidis 90+3' (o.g.)
Penalties
Varkas (penalty scored); Kosteas (penalty scored); Tsilingiris (penalty scored); Daviotis (penalty scored); Xenitidis (penalty scored); Evangelou (penalty scored)	6–5	(penalty scored) Cani; (penalty scored) Chatzidimitriou; (penalty scored) Panagiotou; (penalty scored) Nalitzis; (penalty scored) Petrovic; (penalty missed) Zisoulis

Stavros Mavrothalassitis Stadium, Aigaleo
Referee: Michalis Matsoukas (Aetoloacarnania)

20 August 2025
17:00 EEST

Kampaniakos	0–1	Athens Kallithea
	Report	Mavrias 42'

Kampaniakos Stadium, Thessaloniki
Referee: Ioannis Tomaras (Thrace)

20 August 2025
17:15 EEST

Hellas Syros	1–0	Nestos Chrysoupoli
Kalos 71'	Report

Zirineio Stadium, Kifissia
Referee: Vasilios Fitsas (Preveza-Lefkada)

20 August 2025
17:00 EEST

Chania	0–1	Marko
	Report	Dettler 7'

Veria Stadium, Veria
Referee: Athanasios Boutsikos (Macedonia)

20 August 2025
17:00 EEST

Panionios	1–1 (a.e.t.)	Iraklis
Van der Water 14' (pen.)	Report	Erramuspe 3'
Penalties
Morsay (penalty scored); Yakovlev (penalty scored); Saramantas (penalty missed); Stoupis (penalty missed); Giannakopoulos (penalty missed)	2–3	(penalty missed) Erramuspe; (penalty missed) Gerolemou; (penalty scored) Tsintonis; (penalty scored) Hammond; (penalty scored) Macheras

Nea Smyrni Stadium, Nea Smyrni
Referee: Dimitris Moschou (Lasithi)

== League phase ==
The league phase of the competition will feature the teams that finished 1st to 8th in the 2024–25 Super League 1, along with the 11 teams that qualified from the qualifying round plus the one team that qualified without a match. In total, each team will play 4 matches (2 home and 2 away).

The teams that will finish in the top 4 places, will qualify directly to the quarter-finals, while the teams that will finish in 5th to 12th place will compete in the play-offs with the winners advancing also to the quarter-finals.

=== League phase table ===
Pos	Team	Pld	W	D	L	GF	GA	GD	Pts	Qualification
1	Olympiacos	4	4	0	0	18	3	+15	12	Advance to Quarter-finals
2	Levadiakos	4	4	0	0	10	3	+7	12	Advance to Quarter-finals
3	AEK Athens	4	4	0	0	6	1	+5	12	Advance to Quarter-finals
4	Panathinaikos	4	4	0	0	6	2	+4	12	Advance to Quarter-finals
5	Aris	4	3	1	0	6	2	+4	10	Advance to Play-offs (seeded)
6	OFI	4	3	0	1	7	3	+4	9	Advance to Play-offs (seeded)
7	Volos	4	2	1	1	10	7	+3	7	Advance to Play-offs (seeded)
8	PAOK	4	2	1	1	10	7	+3	7	Advance to Play-offs (seeded)
9	Atromitos	4	2	1	1	7	5	+2	7	Advance to Play-offs (unseeded)
10	A.E. Kifisia	4	1	2	1	4	4	0	5	Advance to Play-offs (unseeded)
11	Asteras Tripolis	4	1	1	2	7	4	+3	4	Advance to Play-offs (unseeded)
12	Panetolikos	4	1	1	2	5	4	+1	4	Advance to Play-offs (unseeded)
13	Iraklis	4	1	1	2	2	9	−7	4	
14	Athens Kallithea	4	1	0	3	3	5	−2	3	
15	Hellas Syros	4	1	0	3	8	13	−5	3	
16	AEL	4	0	1	3	4	9	−5	1	
17	Kavala	4	0	1	3	3	8	−5	1	
18	Marko	4	0	1	3	4	10	−6	1	
19	Ilioupoli	4	0	0	4	1	10	−9	0	
20	Egaleo	4	0	0	4	1	13	−12	0	

Updated to match(es) played on 17 December 2025. Source: epo.gr

=== Results summary ===
Matchday 1
Home team	Score	Away team
Ilioupoli	1–3	Volos
Atromitos	4–2	Hellas Syros
A.E. Kifisia	1–1	Asteras Tripolis
Levadiakos	4–1	PAOK
Marko	2–2	AEL
OFI	3–0	Kavala
Panathinaikos	1–0	Athens Kallithea
Panetolikos	0–1	Aris
Egaleo	0–1	AEK Athens

Matchday 2
Home team	Score	Away team
AEK Athens	2–1	Panetolikos
AEL	1–2	Levadiakos
Asteras Tripolis	1–2	Olympiacos
Athens Kallithea	0–1	OFI
Aris	1–0	Marko
Volos	1–1	Atromitos
Hellas Syros	3–0	Egaleo
Kavala	1–1	A.E. Kifisia
Iraklis	1–0	Ilioupoli

Matchday 3
Home team	Score	Away team
Atromitos	1–2	Panathinaikos
Ilioupoli	0–1	AEK Athens
A.E. Kifisia	2–1	Athens Kallithea
Levadiakos	1–0	Asteras Tripolis
Olympiacos	5–0	Volos
OFI	3–1	Iraklis
Panetolikos	4–1	Hellas Syros
PAOK	4–1	AEL
Egaleo	1–3	Aris

Matchday 4
Home team	Score	Away team
AEK Athens	2–0	OFI
AEL	0–1	Atromitos
Asteras Tripolis	5–0	Ilioupoli
Athens Kallithea	2–1	Kavala
Aris	1–1	PAOK
Volos	6–0	Egaleo
Hellas Syros	2–5	Olympiacos
Marko	1–3	Levadiakos
Iraklis	0–0	Panetolikos
Panathinaikos	1–0	A.E. Kifisia

Matchday 5
Home team	Score	Away team
Kavala	1–2	Panathinaikos
Olympiacos	6–0	Iraklis
PAOK	4–1	Marko

Source:epo.gr

=== Matches ===
==== Matchday 1 ====
16 September 2025
16:00 EEST

Ilioupoli	1–3	Volos
Sam 73'	Report	Assehnoun 15', 90+3'; Zarzana 21'

Ilioupoli Municipal Stadium, Ilioupoli
Referee: Michalis Matsoukas (Euboea)

17 September 2025
15:00 EEST

A.E. Kifisia	1–1	Asteras Tripolis
Tetteh 70' (pen.)	Report	Emmanouilidis 30'

Zirineio Stadium, Kifissia
Referee: Angelos Evangelou (Athens)

17 September 2025
15:00 EEST

Panetolikos	0–1	Aris
	Report	Morón 90+2' (pen.)

Panetolikos Stadium, Agrinio
Referee: Stavros Tsimenteridis (Kozani)

17 September 2025
16:00 EEST

Egaleo	0–1	AEK Athens
	Report	Pierrot 23'

Stavros Mavrothalassitis Stadium, Aigaleo
Referee: Konstantinos Katikos (Athens)

17 September 2025
16:00 EEST

OFI	3–0	Kavala
Nuss 21'; Shengelia 43'; Neira 58'	Report

Theodoros Vardinogiannis Stadium, Heraklion
Referee: Athanasios Tzilos (Larissa)

17 September 2025
16:00 EEST

Atromitos	4–2	Hellas Syros
Tsakmakis 15'; Tsantilas 45', 46'; Palmezano 45+4'	Report	Gogos 80'; Tsiantoulas 83'

Peristeri Stadium, Peristeri
Referee: Georgios Kokkinos (Chalkidiki)

17 September 2025
17:30 EEST

Panathinaikos	1–0	Athens Kallithea
Dessers 30'	Report

Leoforos Alexandras Stadium, Ampelokipoi
Referee: Dimitris Moschou (Lasithi)

17 September 2025
17:30 EEST

Levadiakos	4–1	PAOK
Kędziora 12' (o.g.); Vichos 39'; Pedrozo 50' (pen.); Manthatis 52'	Report	Chalov 36' (pen.)

Levadia Municipal Stadium, Livadeia
Referee: Spyros Zabalas (Ioannina)

17 September 2025
17:30 EEST

Marko	2–2	AEL
Smalis 43'; Mendoza 90+1' (pen.)	Report	Chatzistravos 28'; Mourgos 71'

Karditsa Municipal Stadium, Karditsa
Referee: Meletis Gioumatzidis (Pella)

==== Matchday 2 ====
24 September 2025
19:00 EEST

AEK Athens	2–1	Panetolikos
Pierrot 26'; Kaloskamis 45+1'	Report	Aguirre 90+2' (pen.)

Agia Sophia Stadium, Nea Filadelfeia
Attendance: 15,221
Referee: Stavros Tsimenteridis (Kozani)

24 September 2025
19:00 EEST

AEL	1–2	Levadiakos
Katris 82' (o.g.)	Report	Symelidis 43'; Palacios 90+5'

AEL FC Arena, Larissa
Referee: Anastasios Sidiropoulos (Dodecanese)

24 September 2025
17:00 EEST

Asteras Tripolis	1–2	Olympiacos
Emmanouilidis 90+4'	Report	Taremi 13' (pen.), 18'

Theodoros Kolokotronis Stadium, Tripoli
Referee: Ioannis Papadopoulos (Macedonia)

24 September 2025
15:00 EEST

Athens Kallithea	0–1	OFI
	Report	Salcedo 45'

Grigoris Lamprakis Stadium, Kallithea
Referee: Anastasios Papapetrou (Athens)

23 September 2025
20:00 EEST

Aris	1–0	Marko
Misehouy 16'	Report

Kleanthis Vikelidis Stadium, Thessaloniki
Referee: Georgios Kokkinos (Chalkidiki)

24 September 2025
15:00 EEST

Volos	1–1	Atromitos
Zarzana 38'	Report	Tsantilas 76'

Panthessaliko Stadium, Volos
Referee: Christos Vergetis (Arcadia)

24 September 2025
16:30 EEST

Hellas Syros	3–0	Egaleo
Vernardos 10'; Kola 34'; Trimmatis 62'	Report

Ermoupoli Municipal Stadium, Ermoupoli
Referee: Konstantinos Katikos (Athens)

23 September 2025
15:00 EEST

Kavala	1–1	A.E. Kifisia
Dimosthenous 45+3'	Report	Patiras 90+5'

Doxa Drama Stadium, Drama
Referee: Michalis Matsoukas (Euboea)

25 September 2025
16:00 EEST

Iraklis	1–0	Ilioupoli
Dovedan 35' (pen.)	Report

Kaftanzoglio Stadium, Thessaloniki
Referee: Alexandros Katsikogiannis (Epirus)

==== Matchday 3 ====
29 October 2025
19:30 EET

Atromitos	1–2	Panathinaikos
Baku 37'	Report	Pantović 49'; Mladenović 67'

Peristeri Stadium, Athens
Referee: Alexandros Tsakalidis (Chalkidiki)

29 October 2025
15:30 EET

Ilioupoli	0–1	AEK Athens
	Report	Kaloskamis 90+6'

Ilioupoli Municipal Stadium, Ilioupoli
Referee: Giorgos Kokkinos (Chalkidiki)

28 October 2025
20:00 EET

A.E. Kifisia	2–1	Athens Kallithea
Amani 65'; Musiolik 69'	Report	Cantillo 8'

Panthessaliko Stadium, Volos
Referee: Stavros Tsimenteridis (Kozani)

29 October 2025
18:30 EET

Levadiakos	1–0	Asteras Tripolis
Balzi 73'	Report

Levadia Municipal Stadium, Livadeia
Referee: Angelos Evangelou (Athens)

29 October 2025
17:30 EET

Olympiacos	5–0	Volos
Biancone 5', 45+2'; Yaremchuk 43', 44'; Yazıcı 67' (pen.)	Report

Karaiskakis Stadium, Piraeus
Referee: Spyros Zabalas (Epirus)

28 October 2025
16:00 EET

OFI	3–1	Iraklis
Rakonjac 35'; Nuss 84'; Salcedo 90+3'	Report	Kushta 28'

Pankritio Stadium, Heraklion
Referee: Meletis Gioumatzidis (Pella)

28 October 2025
18:00 EET

Panetolikos	4–1	Hellas Syros
Chura 3'; Mățan 13'; Aguirre 61', 86'	Report	Giakos 6' (pen.)

Panetolikos Stadium, Agrinio
Referee: Michalis Matsoukas (Aetoloacarnania)

29 October 2025
21:30 EET

PAOK	4–1	AEL
Ivanušec 2'; Konstantelias 12'; Despodov 18' (pen.); Mythou 31'	Report	Tupta 75'

Toumba Stadium, Thessaloniki
Referee: Fotis Polychronis (Pieria)

29 October 2025
15:00 EET

Egaleo	1–3	Aris
Fofana 54'	Report	Rose 29'; Sundberg 59'; Morón 90+5'

Municipal Stadium of Karditsa, Karditsa
Referee: Panagiotis Koukoulas (Lesbos)

==== Matchday 4 ====
3 December 2025
17:30 EET

AEK Athens	2–0	OFI
Pereyra 19'; João Mário 61'	Report

Agia Sophia Stadium, Nea Filadelfeia
Referee: Angelos Evangelou (Athens)

3 December 2025
16:00 EET

AEL	0–1	Atromitos
	Report	Baku 79'

AEL FC Arena, Larissa
Referee: Stavros Tsimenteridis (Kozani)

3 December 2025
17:00 EET

Asteras Tripolis	5–0	Ilioupoli
Gioacchini 22', 90+2'; Muñoz 34'; Emmanouilidis 77'; Chidera 82'	Report

Theodoros Kolokotronis Stadium, Tripoli
Referee: Ioannis Papadopoulos (Macedonia)

3 December 2025
15:00 EET

Athens Kallithea	2–1	Kavala
Sotirakos 19'; Sardelis 51'	Report	Stamoulis 48'

Grigoris Lamprakis Stadium, Kallithea
Referee: Meletis Gioumatzidis (Pella)

3 December 2025
21:30 EET

Aris	1–1	PAOK
Dudu 47'	Report	Giakoumakis 90+6'

Kleanthis Vikelidis Stadium, Thessaloniki
Referee: Anastasios Papapetrou (Athens)

2 December 2025
19:00 EET

Volos	6–0	Egaleo
Assehnoun 10', 88'; Santis 13'; Hamulić 57', 62', 84'	Report

Panthessaliko Stadium, Volos
Referee: Michalis Matsoukas (Aetoloacarnania)

3 December 2025
13:30 EET

Hellas Syros	2–5	Olympiacos
Vernardos 51', 78'	Report	Yazıcı 25', 61'; Taremi 48'; Yaremchuk 84'; El Kaabi 90+1'

Ermoupoli Municipal Stadium, Ermoupoli
Referee: Konstantinos Katikos (Athens)

3 December 2025
15:00 EET

Marko	1–3	Levadiakos
Kyriakidis 90+2' (pen.)	Report	Jurić 45+2' (pen.), 75'; Pedrozo 65'

Municipal Stadium of Markopoulo, Markopoulo Mesogeas
Referee: Alexandros Katsikogiannis (Epirus)

4 December 2025
17:00 EET

Iraklis	0–0	Panetolikos
	Report

Kaftanzoglio Stadium, Thessaloniki
Referee: Dimitris Moschou (Lasithi)

3 December 2025
19:30 EET

Panathinaikos	1–0	A.E. Kifisia
Bakasetas 67' (pen.)	Report

Leoforos Alexandras Stadium, Ampelokipoi
Referee: Vasilis Fotias (Pella)

==== Matchday 5 ====
17 December 2025
16:00 EET

Kavala	1–2	Panathinaikos
Sifneos 34' (pen.)	Report	Mladenović 18'; Taborda 53'

Anthi Karagianni Stadium, Kavala
Referee: Georgios Kokkinos (Chalkidiki)

17 December 2025
18:00 EET

Olympiacos	6–0	Iraklis
Yazıcı 12'; Kalogeropoulos 22'; Rodinei 40'; Chiquinho 45'; Yaremchuk 51'; Retsos 70'	Report

Karaiskakis Stadium, Piraeus
Referee: Alexandros Katsikogiannis (Epirus)

17 December 2025
20:00 EET

PAOK	4–1	Marko
Konstantelias 17', 37'; Mythou 26'; Camara 90'	Report	Müller 84'

Toumba Stadium, Thessaloniki
Referee: Dimitris Moschou (Lasithi)

== Bracket ==
Play-offs
Aris	2
Panetolikos	0
PAOK (p)	1(5)
Atromitos	1(4)
OFI	2
Asteras Tripolis	0
Volos	0
A.E. Kifisia	1

Quarter-finals
Panathinaikos	3
Aris	0
Olympiacos	0
PAOK	2
AEK Athens	0
OFI	1
Levadiakos	2
A.E. Kifisia	0

Semi-finals
Panathinaikos	0	0	0
PAOK	1	2	3
OFI	1	1	2
Levadiakos	1	0	1

Final
PAOK	2
OFI (a.e.t.)	3

== Play-offs ==
=== Summary ===
Team 1	Score	Team 2
Aris	2–0	Panetolikos
Volos	0–1	A.E. Kifisia
PAOK	1–1 (5–4 p)	Atromitos
OFI	2–0	Asteras Tripolis

=== Matches ===
6 January 2026
15:00 EET

Aris	2–0	Panetolikos
Morón 30'; Račić 44'	Report

Kleanthis Vikelidis Stadium, Thessaloniki
Referee: Anastasios Sidiropoulos (Dodecanese)

6 January 2026
17:30 EET

Volos	0–1	A.E. Kifisia
	Report	Amani 82'

Panthessaliko Stadium, Volos
Referee: Alexandros Tsakalidis (Chalkidiki)

6 January 2026
20:00 EET

PAOK	1–1	Atromitos
Živković 54'	Report	Baku 52'
Penalties
Michailidis (penalty scored); Kenny (penalty scored); Kędziora (penalty scored); Taison (penalty scored); Giakoumakis (penalty scored)	5–4	(penalty scored) Tsakmakis; (penalty scored) Aitor García; (penalty scored) Palmezano; (penalty scored) Mansur; (penalty missed) Karamanis

Toumba Stadium, Thessaloniki
Referee: Anastasios Papapetrou (Athens)

7 January 2026
17:00 EET

OFI	2–0	Asteras Tripolis
González 36'; Iseka 58' (pen.)	Report

Pankritio Stadium, Heraklion
Referee: Ioannis Papadopoulos (Macedonia)

== Quarter-finals ==
=== Summary ===
Team 1	Score	Team 2
Levadiakos	2–0	A.E. Kifisia
AEK Athens	0–1	OFI
Olympiacos	0–2	PAOK
Panathinaikos	3–0	Aris

=== Matches ===
14 January 2026
15:00 EET

Levadiakos	2–0	A.E. Kifisia
Magnússon 45+2'; Balzi 90+4'	Report

Levadia Municipal Stadium, Livadeia
Referee: Vasilis Fotias (Pella)

14 January 2026
17:00 EET

AEK Athens	0–1	OFI
	Report	Salcedo 80'

Agia Sophia Stadium, Nea Filadelfeia
Referee: Anastasios Papapetrou (Athens)

14 January 2026
18:30 EET

Olympiacos	0–2	PAOK
	Report	Mythou 7'; Ozdoyev 15'

Karaiskakis Stadium, Piraeus
Referee: Alexandros Tsakalidis (Chalkidiki)

14 January 2026
20:30 EET

Panathinaikos	3–0	Aris
Bakasetas 16', 53' (pen.), 65' (pen.)	Report

Olympic Stadium, Marousi
Referee: Angelos Evangelou (Athens)

== Semi-finals ==
=== Summary ===
Team 1	Agg.	Team 2	1st leg	2nd leg
Panathinaikos	0–3	PAOK	0–1	0–2
OFI	2–1	Levadiakos	1–1	1–0

=== Matches ===
4 February 2026
17:00 EET

OFI	1–1	Levadiakos
González 5'	Report	Balzi 18'

Pankritio Stadium, Heraklion
Referee: Alexandros Tsakalidis (Chalkidiki)
11 February 2026
17:00 EET

Levadiakos	0–1	OFI
	Report	Lampropoulos 45'

Levadia Municipal Stadium, Livadeia
Referee: Anastasios Papapetrou (Athens)

4 February 2026
20:30 EET

Panathinaikos	0–1	PAOK
	Report	Giakoumakis 66' (pen.)

Leoforos Alexandras Stadium, Ampelokipoi
Referee: Angelos Evangelou (Athens)
11 February 2026
20:30 EET

PAOK	2–0	Panathinaikos
Giakoumakis 71'; Chatsidis 87'	Report

Toumba Stadium, Thessaloniki
Referee: Vasilis Fotias (Pella)

== Final ==
25 April 2026
20:30 EEST

PAOK	2–3 (a.e.t.)	OFI
Kędziora 15'; Jeremejeff 90+7'	Report	Fountas 28'; Nuss 49'; Leya Iseka 105+4'

Panthessaliko Stadium, Volos
Attendance: 20,108
Referee: Angelos Evangelou (Athens)

== Top scorers ==
Rank	Player	Club	Goals
1	(Cuba) Jorge Aguirre	Panetolikos	4
1	(Bosnia and Herzegovina) Said Hamulić	Volos	4
1	(Finland) Jasin-Amin Assehnoun	Volos	4
1	(Ukraine) Roman Yaremchuk	Olympiacos	4
1	(Turkey) Yusuf Yazıcı	Olympiacos	4
1	(Greece) Anastasios Bakasetas	Panathinaikos	4
7	(Greece) Panagiotis Tsantilas	Atromitos	3
7	(Greece) Makana Baku	Atromitos	3
7	(Greece) Giannis Konstantelias	PAOK	3
7	(Greece) Anestis Mythou	PAOK	3
7	(Greece) Giorgos Giakoumakis	PAOK	3
7	(Italy) Eddie Salcedo	OFI	3
7	(Argentina) Thiago Nuss	OFI	3
7	(Iran) Mehdi Taremi	Olympiacos	3
7	(Greece) Dimitrios Emmanouilidis	Asteras Tripolis	3
7	(Argentina) Guillermo Balzi	Levadiakos	3
7	(Spain) Loren Morón	Aris	3
