= 2025–26 Olympiacos F.C. season =

Olympiacos
2025–26 season
- Owner: Evangelos Marinakis
- President: Evangelos Marinakis
- Manager: José Luis Mendilibar
- Stadium: Karaiskakis Stadium
- Super League Greece: 2nd
- Greek Cup: Quarter-finals
- Greek Super Cup: Winners
- Champions League: Knockout phase play-offs
- Top goalscorer: League: Ayoub El Kaabi (18); All: Ayoub El Kaabi (21)
- Highest home attendance: 32,930
- Lowest home attendance: 24,494
- Average home league attendance: 28,664
- Biggest win: Olympiacos 6–0 Iraklis
- Biggest defeat: Barcelona 6–1 Olympiacos
Home colours	Away colours	Third colours
- All statistics correct as of 17 May 2026.

The 2025–26 season is the 101st season in existence of Olympiacos and the club's 67th consecutive season in the top flight of Greek football. In addition to the Greek Super League, Olympiacos participates in this season's Greek Cup, the Greek Super Cup, and UEFA Champions League as the winner of the 2024–25 Greek Super League. The season covers the period from June 2025 to late May 2026.

== Players ==
=== First team ===
As of 3 February 2025

Squad No.	Name	Nationality	Position(s)	Place of birth	Date of birth (Age)	Previous club
Goalkeepers
1	Alexandros Paschalakis	(Greece)	GK	Athens, Greece	28 July 1989 (36)	(Greece) PAOK
31	Nikolaos Botis	(Greece)	GK	Larisa, Greece	31 March 2004 (21)	(Italy) Inter U19
61	Georgios Kouraklis	(Greece)	GK	Athens, Greece	18 March 2006 (19)	(Greece) Olympiacos U19
88	Konstantinos Tzolakis	(Greece)	GK	Chania, Greece	8 November 2002 (23)	(Greece) Olympiacos U19
Defenders
3	Francisco Ortega	(Argentina)	LB	Santa Fe, Argentina	19 March 1999 (26)	(Argentina) Velez Sarsfield
4	Giulian Biancone	(France)	CB	Fréjus, France	31 March 2000 (25)	(England) Nottingham Forest
5	Lorenzo Pirola	(Italy)	CB	Carate Brianza, Italy	20 February 2002 (23)	(Italy) Salernitana
6	Alexis Kalogeropoulos	(Greece)	CB	Andravida, Greece	26 July 2004 (21)	(Greece) Volos
20	Costinha	(Portugal)	RB	Póvoa de Varzim, Portugal	26 March 2000 (25)	(Portugal) Rio Ave
21	Rúben Vezo	(Portugal)	CB	Setúbal, Portugal	25 April 1994 (31)	(Turkey) Eyüpspor
23	Rodinei	(Brazil)	RB/RW	Tatuí, Brazil	29 January 1992 (34)	(Brazil) Flamengo
45	Panagiotis Retsos	(Greece)	CB	Johannesburg, South Africa	9 August 1998 (27)	(Italy) Hellas Verona
70	Bruno Onyemaechi	(Nigeria)	LB	Owerri, Nigeria	3 April 1999 (26)	(Portugal) Boavista
Midfielders
8	Diogo Nascimento	(Portugal)	CM	Leiria, Portugal	2 November 2002 (22)	(Portugal) Vizela
10	Gelson Martins	(Cape Verde) (Portugal)	RW	Praia, Cape Verde	11 May 1995 (30)	(France) Monaco
14	Dani García	(Spain)	DM	Zumarraga, Spain	24 May 1990 (35)	(Spain) Athletic Bilbao
16	Lorenzo Scipioni	(Argentina) (Italy)	DM/CM	Buenos Aires, Argentina	20 November 2004 (20)	(Argentina) Tigre
17	André Luiz	(Brazil)	LW	Rio de Janeiro, Brazil	23 February 2002 (23)	(Portugal) Rio Ave
22	Chiquinho	(Portugal)	CM/AM	Santo Tirso, Portugal	19 July 1995 (30)	(Portugal) Benfica
32	Santiago Hezze	(Argentina) (Poland)	DM/CM	Buenos Aires, Argentina	22 October 2001 (24)	(Argentina) Huracán
56	Daniel Podence	(Portugal)	LW/RW	Oeiras, Portugal	21 October 1995 (30)	(Saudi Arabia) Al-Shabab
67	Argyris Liatsikouras	(Greece)	DM	Paiania, Greece	20 December 2006 (19)	(Greece) Olympiacos U19
96	Christos Mouzakitis	(Greece)	CM	Corfu, Greece	25 December 2006 (19)	(Greece) Olympiacos U19
97	Yusuf Yazıcı	(Turkey)	AM	Trabzon, Turkey	29 January 1997 (28)	(France) Lille
Forwards
9	Ayoub El Kaabi	(Morocco)	FW	Casablanca, Morocco	25 June 1993 (32)	(Qatar) Al Sadd
19	Clayton	(Brazil)	FW	Belo Horizonte, Brazil	11 January 1999 (27)	(Portugal) Rio Ave
99	Mehdi Taremi	(Iran)	FW	Bushehr, Iran	18 July 1992 (33)	(Italy) Inter Milan

== Backroom staff ==
=== Coaching staff ===
Position	Staff
Sports director	(Serbia) Darko Kovačević
Assistant sports director	(Spain) Jose Ignacio Navarro
Strategic Advisor & Ambassador	(France) Christian Karembeu
Head coach	(Spain) José Luis Mendilibar
Assistant coaches	(Spain) Antonio Jose Ruiz Perez
Assistant coaches	(Spain) Francisco Manuel Rico Castro
Analysts	(Greece) Giannis Vogiatzakis
Analysts	(Greece) Iosif Loukas
Fitness coach	(Greece) Christos Mourikis
Goalkeepers coach	(Greece) Panagiotis Agriogiannis
Rehabilitation trainer	(Greece) Kostas Liougkos
Medical team
Doctor	(Greece) Andreas Piskopakis
Physios	(Greece) Nikos Lykouresis
Physios	(Greece) Stavros Petrocheilos
Physios	(Greece) Konstantinos Koulidis
Physios	(Greece) Panagiotis Karamouzas
Nutritionist	(Portugal) Hernani Araujo Gomes
Scouts
Scouting Coordinator	(Spain) Jaime Cordon
Scouting and Sports Technology	(Greece) Giannis Theodorou
Scout	(Greece) Simos Havos

== Transfers ==
=== In ===
Νο.	Pos.	Nat.	Name	Age	Moving from	Type	Transfer window	Transfer fee	Notes
90	MF	(France)	Rémy Cabella	35	(France) Lille	Transfer	Summer	Free	
6	DF	(Greece)	Alexis Kalogeropoulos	21	(Greece) Volos	End of Loan	Summer	Free	
81	FW	(Greece)	Konstantinos Angelakis	18	(Greece) Asteras Tripolis	Transfer	Summer	€1.2M	B team
	DF	(Greece)	Nikos Athanasiou	24	(Greece) Atromitos	Transfer	Summer	Free	
16	MF	(Argentina)	Lorenzo Scipioni	20	(Argentina) Tigre	Transfer	Summer	€3.67M	
8	MF	(Portugal)	Diogo Nascimento	22	(Portugal) Vizela	Transfer	Summer	€4M	
27	MF	(Brazil)	Gabriel Strefezza	28	(Italy) Como	Transfer	Summer	€8M	
39	DF	(Brazil)	Gustavo Mancha	21	(Brazil) Fortaleza	Transfer	Summer	€4.5M	
99	FW	(Iran)	Mehdi Taremi	33	(Italy) Inter Milan	Transfer	Summer	€2M	
56	MF	(Portugal)	Daniel Podence	29	(Saudi Arabia) Al-Shabab	Loan	Summer	Free	Option to buy
	MF	(Greece)	Theofanis Bakoulas	21	(Portugal) Rio Ave	End of Loan	Winter	Free	
17	MF	(Brazil)	André Luiz	24	(Portugal) Rio Ave	Transfer	Winter	€6.75M	
	DF	(Greece)	Nikos Athanasiou	24	(Portugal) Rio Ave	End of Loan	Winter	Free	
19	FW	(Brazil)	Clayton	27	(Portugal) Rio Ave	Transfer	Winter	€5M	

▼ Total Spending: €35.12M

=== Out ===
Νο.	Pos.	Nat.	Name	Age	Moving to	Type	Transfer window	Transfer fee	Notes
8	MF	(New Zealand)	Marko Stamenić	23	(England) Nottingham Forest	End of Loan	Summer	Free	
21	MF	(Portugal)	André Horta	28	(Portugal) Braga	End of Loan	Summer	Free	
16	DF	(Angola)	David Carmo	26	(England) Nottingham Forest	End of Loan	Summer	Free	
50	MF	(Honduras)	Luis Palma	25	(Scotland) Celtic	End of Loan	Summer	Free	
	DF	(Israel)	Doron Leidner	23	(Israel) Hapoel Tel Aviv	Loan	Summer	Free	Option to buy
84	FW	(Greece)	Charalampos Kostoulas	18	(England) Brighton	Transfer	Summer	€35M	
	DF	(Greece)	Nikos Athanasiou	24	(Portugal) Rio Ave	Loan	Summer	Free	
	MF	(Greece)	Antonis Papakanellos	20	(Portugal) Rio Ave	Loan	Summer	Free	
	DF	(Greece)	Andreas Ntoi	22	(Portugal) Rio Ave	Transfer	Summer	Free	
	DF	(England)	Nelson Abbey	22	(Portugal) Rio Ave	Transfer	Summer	Free	
	GK	(Albania)	Anxhelo Sina	21	(Portugal) Rio Ave	Transfer	Summer	Free	
	DF	(Greece)	Konstantinos Kostoulas	20	(Greece) OFI	Transfer	Summer	Free	
11	MF	(Norway)	Kristoffer Velde	26	(United States) Portland Timbers	Transfer	Summer	€4.3M	
	FW	(Spain)	Jefté Betancor	32	(Spain) Albacete	Loan	Summer	Free	Option to buy
	MF	(Greece)	Georgios Masouras	31	(Saudi Arabia) Al-Khaleej	Loan	Summer	Free	
99	GK	(Greece)	Alexandros Anagnostopoulos	31	(Greece) AEL	Transfer	Summer	Free	
90	MF	(France)	Rémy Cabella	35	(France) Nantes	Loan	Winter	Free	
	MF	(Spain)	Pep Biel	29	(United States) Charlotte	Transfer	Winter	€3.5M	
11	FW	(Ukraine)	Roman Yaremchuk	30	(France) Lyon	Loan	Winter	€1.5M	Option to buy €5M
27	MF	(Brazil)	Gabriel Strefezza	28	(Italy) Parma	Loan	Winter	Free	
39	DF	(Brazil)	Gustavo Mancha	21	(Portugal) Rio Ave	Loan	Winter	Free	
80	LW	(Greece)	Stavros Pnevmonidis	19	(Greece) Atromitos	Loan	Winter	Free	
	DF	(Greece)	Nikos Athanasiou	24	(Greece) OFI	Loan	Winter	Free	

▲ Total Income: €44.3M

Net Income: ▲€9.18M

== Friendlies ==
Win Draw Loss

19 July 2025	(Netherlands) NAC Breda	2–3	Olympiacos (Greece)	Sint Willebrord, Netherlands
15:00 EEST	Mahmutović 80'; Reulen 90'	Report	Yaremchuk 6'; Pnevmonidis 10'; Liatsikouras 38'	Stadium: Sportpark De Gagelrijzen

25 July 2025	(England) Norwich City	0–3	Olympiacos (Greece)	Vlaardingen, Netherlands
13:00 EEST		Report	Yazıcı 32'; Yaremchuk 47'; Biancone 56'	Stadium: Sportpark 't Nieuwelant

26 July 2025	(Netherlands) AZ Alkmaar	0–2	Olympiacos (Greece)	Alkmaar, Netherlands
16:00 EEST		Report	El Kaabi 36', 72'	Stadium: AFAS Stadion

2 August 2025	(Netherlands) Heerenveen	1–1	Olympiacos (Greece)	Heerenveen, Netherlands
17:00 EEST	Brouwers 28'	Report	Chiquinho 50'	Stadium: Abe Lenstra Stadion

3 August 2025	(Netherlands) ADO Den Haag	2–3	Olympiacos (Greece)	The Hague, Netherlands
16:00 EEST	Sylla 71'; Silva-Richards 85'	Report	El Kaabi 12', 19', 65'	Stadium: Zuiderpark Stadium; Referee: Allard Lindhout (Netherlands)

8 August 2025	(Saudi Arabia) Al-Taawoun	1–2	Olympiacos (Greece)	Vlaardingen, Netherlands
17:00 EEST	Martínez 51'	Report	Pnevmonidis 10'; Strefezza 47'	Stadium: Sportpark 't Nieuwelant

9 August 2025	(Germany) Union Berlin	0–1	Olympiacos (Greece)	Berlin, Germany
16:30 EEST		Report	Chiquinho 74'	Stadium: Stadion An der Alten Försterei

14 August 2025	(Italy) Napoli	2–1	Olympiacos (Greece)	Castel di Sangro, Italy
19:00 EEST	Politano 16'; Lucca 53'	Report	Chiquinho 90+1'	Stadium: Stadio Teofilo Patini; Referee: Federico Dionisi (ITA)

16 August 2025	(Italy) Inter Milan	2–0	Olympiacos (Greece)	Bari, Italy
21:30 EEST	Dimarco 16'; Thuram 53'	Report		Stadium: Stadio San Nicola; Referee: Ivano Pezzuto (ITA)

== Competitions ==
=== Overview ===
Competition	Starting round	Final position	Record							
Competition	Starting round	Final position	Pld	W	D	L	GF	GA	GD	Win %
Super League Greece	Matchday 1	2nd	32	19	9	4	51	17	+34	59.38
Greek Football Cup	League Phase	Quarter-finals	5	4	0	1	18	5	+13	80.00
UEFA Champions League	League Phase	Knockout phase play-offs	10	3	3	4	10	16	−6	30.00
Greek Super Cup	Final	Winners	1	1	0	0	3	0	+3	100.00
Total			48	27	12	9	82	38	+44	56.25

Last updated: 17 May 2026
Source: Competitions

=== Super League Greece ===
==== League table ====
Pos	Team	Pld	W	D	L	GF	GA	GD	Pts	Qualification or relegation
1	AEK Athens	26	18	6	2	49	17	+32	60	Qualification for the Championship play-offs
2	Olympiacos	26	17	7	2	45	11	+34	58	Qualification for the Championship play-offs
3	PAOK	26	17	6	3	52	17	+35	57	Qualification for the Championship play-offs
4	Panathinaikos	26	14	7	5	44	26	+18	49	Qualification for the Championship play-offs
5	Levadiakos	26	12	6	8	51	37	+14	42	Qualification for the Europe play-offs

Source: Super League Greece
Rules for classification: 1) Points; 2) Head-to-head points; 3) Head-to-head goal difference; 4) Overall goal difference; 5) Goals scored; 6) Total wins; 7) Away goals scored; 8) Away wins.

==== Results summary ====
Overall								Home						Away					
Pld	W	D	L	GF	GA	GD	Pts	W	D	L	GF	GA	GD	W	D	L	GF	GA	GD
26	17	7	2	45	11	+34	58	9	3	1	24	5	+19	8	4	1	21	6	+15

==== Results by matchday ====
Matchday	1	2	3	4	5	6	7	8	9	10	11	12	13	14	15	16	17	18	19	20	21	22	23	24	25	26
Ground	H	A	H	A	H	A	A	H	H	A	H	A	H	A	H	A	A	H	A	H	A	H	A	H	A	H
Result	W	W	W	D	W	L	W	W	W	W	W	W	W	D	D	W	W	W	D	L	D	W	W	D	W	D
Position	4	1	1	1	1	3	2	2	2	1	1	1	1	1	2	1	3	2	3	2	2	2	1	3	2	2

Source: Super League Greece
A = Away; H = Home; W = Win; D = Draw; L = Loss

==== Regular season matches ====
Win Draw Loss

23 August 2025 1	Olympiacos	2–0	Asteras Tripolis	Piraeus
20:00 EEST	Yazıcı 90+3'; El Kaabi 90+7'	Report	Tsintotas (yellow card) 83'; Triantafyllopoulos (yellow card) 90+1'; Papadopoulos (yellow card) 90+1'	Stadium: Karaiskakis Stadium; Attendance: 0 Referee: Anastasios Sidiropoulos

30 August 2025 2	Volos	0–2	Olympiacos	Volos
19:00 EEST	Martínez (yellow card) 11'; Hermannsson (yellow card) 45+2'	Report	Chiquinho 77'; Retsos 86'	Stadium: Panthessaliko Stadium; Attendance: 9,259; Referee: Stavros Tsimenteridis

13 September 2025 3	Olympiacos	5–0	Panserraikos	Piraeus
18:00 EEST	El Kaabi 48'; Ortega 66'; Podence 70'; Taremi 88', 90+3'	Report	Banjaqui (yellow card) 17'; Green (red card) 35'; De Marco (yellow card) 73'; Nunnely (yellow card) 76'	Stadium: Karaiskakis Stadium; Attendance: 30,000; Referee: Spyridon Zampalas

21 September 2025 4	Panathinaikos	1–1	Olympiacos	Athens
21:00 EEST	Dessers (yellow card) 39' (goal) 48'; Bakasetas (yellow card) 53'; Chirivella (yellow card) 87'; Kotsiras (yellow card) 90+6'	Report	Strefezza (yellow card) 22'; Cabella (yellow card) 35'; Scipioni (yellow card) 67'; El Kaabi 90+2' (yellow card) 90+2'	Stadium: Leoforos Alexandras Stadium; Attendance: 11,880; Referee: Deniz Aytekin (Germany)

27 September 2025 5	Olympiacos	3–2	Levadiakos	Piraeus
18:00 EEST	Ortega (yellow card) 19'; Retsos 43'; Hezze (yellow card) 50'; Chiquinho 60', 90+6'	Report	Abu Hanna (yellow card) 29'; Liagas (yellow card) 57'; Palacios 58'; Çokaj (yellow card) 63'; Kosti (yellow card) 72'; Goumas 79'; Pedrozo (yellow card) 90+13'	Stadium: Karaiskakis Stadium; Attendance: 30,500; Referee: Alexandros Katsikogiannis

5 October 2025 6	PAOK	2–1	Olympiacos	Thessaloniki
20:30 EEST	Kędziora (yellow card) 42'; Taison 63'; Živković 75' (pen.) (yellow card) 90+3'; Konstantelias (yellow card) 85'; Ivanušec (yellow card) 90'	Report	Chiquinho 22'; Biancone (yellow card) 36'; Podence (yellow card) 42'; Costinha (yellow card) 47'	Stadium: Toumba Stadium; Attendance: 23,961; Referee: Harm Osmers (Germany)

18 October 2025 7	AEL	0–2	Olympiacos	Larissa
17:00 EEST	Kovačević (yellow card) 17'; Chakla (yellow card) 69'; Kossonou (yellow card) 90'	Report	El Kaabi 1', 44' (pen.); Scipioni (yellow card) 36'	Stadium: AEL FC Arena; Attendance: 10,184; Referee: Alexandros Tsakalidis

26 October 2025 8	Olympiacos	2–0	AEK Athens	Piraeus
21:00 EEST	Podence (yellow card) 24'; El Kaabi 33' (pen.); García (yellow card) 35'; Taremi 67'; Retsos (yellow card) 73'	Report	Koïta (yellow card) 62'; Mantalos (yellow card) 66'	Stadium: Karaiskakis Stadium; Attendance: 32,930; Referee: Tobias Stieler (Germany)

1 November 2025 9	Olympiacos	2–1	Aris	Piraeus
20:00 EET	Mouzakitis (yellow card) 40'; Podence 49'; Taremi 60'; Mancha (red card) 73'; Bruno (yellow card) 90+2'	Report	Morón 74' (pen.); Monchu (yellow card) 90+6'	Stadium: Karaiskakis Stadium; Attendance: 31,000; Referee: Daniel Siebert (Germany)

9 November 2025 10	A.E. Kifisia	1–3	Olympiacos	Piraeus
15:00 EET	Sousa (yellow card) 13'; Tetteh (yellow card) 40'; Ramírez (yellow card) 43'; Pantelidis 47'; Maidana (yellow card) 54' (yellow-red card) 61'	Report	Nascimento 37'; El Kaabi (yellow card) 43' (goal) 57' (pen.), 70' (pen.)	Stadium: Neapoli Stadium; Attendance: 1,940; Referee: Christos Vergetis

22 November 2025 11	Olympiacos	3–0	Atromitos	Piraeus
20:00 EET	El Kaabi 37' (pen.); Taremi 81', 90'	Report	Michorl (yellow card) 20'; Tsakmakis (yellow card) 36'	Stadium: Karaiskakis Stadium; Attendance: 30,001; Referee: Anastasios Sidiropoulos

30 November 2025 12	Panetolikos	0–1	Olympiacos	Agrinio
17:00 EET		Report	El Kaabi 70'	Stadium: Panetolikos Stadium; Attendance: 3,061; Referee: Alexandros Tsakalidis

6 December 2025 13	Olympiacos	3–0	OFI	Piraeus
17:00 EET	El Kaabi 33', 40'; Strefezza 63'	Report	Nuss (yellow card) 27'; Theodosoulakis (yellow card) 57'	Stadium: Karaiskakis Stadium; Attendance: 28,759; Referee: Fotis Polychronis

14 December 2025 14	Aris	0–0	Olympiacos	Thessaloniki
20:00 EET	Galanopoulos (yellow card) 48'; Fadiga (red card) 61'; Frýdek (yellow card) 68'; Morón (yellow card) 81'; Athanasiadis (yellow card) 89'	Report	García (yellow card) 19' (yellow-red card) 51'; Mouzakitis (yellow card) 29'	Stadium: Kleanthis Vikelidis Stadium; Attendance: 4,876; Referee: Sven Jablonski (Germany)

20 December 2025 15	Olympiacos	1–1	A.E. Kifisia	Piraeus
20:30 EET	Taremi 19' (pen.)	Report	Pantelidis 23' (yellow card) 17' (yellow-red card) 90+2'; Pokorný (yellow card) 45+1'; Villafáñez (yellow card) 79'; Christopoulos (yellow card) 88'	Stadium: Karaiskakis Stadium; Attendance: 29,501; Referee: Angelos Evangelou

10 January 2026 16	Atromitos	0–2	Olympiacos	Peristeri
19:30 EET	Moutoussamy (yellow card) 34'; Stavropoulos (yellow card) 38'; Michorl (yellow card) 59'	Report	Martins 35'; Taremi 56'; Biancone (yellow card) 79'; Yaremchuk (yellow card) 90+3'	Stadium: Peristeri Stadium; Attendance: 2,818; Referee: Stavros Tsimenteridis

24 January 2026 18	Olympiacos	1–0	Volos	Piraeus
17:00 EET	El Kaabi 26'	Report		Stadium: Karaiskakis Stadium; Attendance: 27,777; Referee: Anastasios Sidiropoulos

1 February 2026 19	AEK Athens	1–1	Olympiacos	Nea Filadelfeia
21:00 EET	Varga 59'; Koïta (yellow card) 82'; Marin (yellow card) 90+2'; Moukoudi (yellow card) 90+3'	Report	Costinha (yellow card) 20'; Hezze (yellow card) 52'; Podence (yellow card) 61'; Taremi (yellow card) 68' (goal) 90+16' (pen.); Retsos (yellow card) 90+15'	Stadium: Agia Sophia Stadium; Attendance: 31,100; Referee: Danny Makkelie (Netherlands)

4 February 2026 17	Asteras Tripolis	0–3	Olympiacos	Tripoli
18:30 EET	Castaño (yellow card) 53'	Report	García 3'; Bruno (yellow card) 19'; Taremi 27'; Martins 59'; André Luiz (yellow card) 75'	Stadium: Theodoros Kolokotronis Stadium; Attendance: 3,919; Referee: Alexandros Katsikogiannis

8 February 2026 20	Olympiacos	0–1	Panathinaikos	Piraeus
21:00 EET	Martins (yellow card) 90+2'	Report	Taborda 7'; Calabria (yellow card) 48'; Tetteh (yellow card) 63'; Świderski (yellow card) 71'	Stadium: Karaiskakis Stadium; Attendance: 32,954; Referee: Erik Lambrechts (Belgium)

15 February 2026 21	Levadiakos	0–0	Olympiacos	Livadeia
16:00 EET	Jallow (yellow card) 17'; Ožbolt (yellow card) 41' (yellow-red card) 42'	Report	Rodinei (yellow card) 45+1'	Stadium: Livadeia Municipal Stadium; Attendance: 3,440; Referee: Vasilis Fotias

21 February 2026 22	Olympiacos	2–0	Panetolikos	Piraeus
17:00 EEST	Pirola 37'; Yazıcı 89'; Ortega (yellow card) 90+2'	Report	Lobato (yellow card) 23'; Badji (yellow card) 75'	Stadium: Karaiskakis Stadium; Attendance: 24,494; Referee: Spyridon Zampalas

1 March 2026 23	Panserraikos	1–2	Olympiacos	Serres
16:00 EET	Ivan (yellow card) 29'; De Marco 82'	Report	El Kaabi 60', 70'; Bruno (yellow card) 87'	Stadium: Serres Municipal Stadium; Attendance: 4,124; Referee: Fotis Polychronis

8 March 2026 24	Olympiacos	0–0	PAOK	Piraeus
21:00 EET	Retsos (yellow card) 44'	Report	Michailidis (yellow card) 89'	Stadium: Karaiskakis Stadium; Attendance: 32,855; Referee: José María Sánchez Martínez (ESP)

14 March 2026 25	OFI	0–3	Olympiacos	Heraklion
17:00 EET	Kanellopoulos (yellow card) 36'; Salcedo (yellow card) 77'	Report	El Kaabi 30', 70'; Rodinei (yellow card) 45+3'; Retsos (yellow card) 65'; García (yellow card) 67'; Mouzakitis 90+2' (pen.)	Stadium: Theodoros Vardinogiannis Stadium; Attendance: 10,232; Referee: Michail Matsoukas

22 March 2026 26	Olympiacos	0–0	AEL	Piraeus
19:00 EET	Sisto (yellow card) 68'; Garate (yellow card) 85'; Naor (yellow card) 90+3'	Report		Stadium: Karaiskakis Stadium; Attendance: 32,500; Referee: Christos Vergetis

==== Championship Play-Offs ====
Pos	Team	Pld	W	D	L	GF	GA	GD	Pts	Qualification
1	AEK Athens (C)	32	21	9	2	57	20	+37	72	Qualification for the Champions League play-off round
2	Olympiacos	32	19	9	4	51	17	+34	66	Qualification for the Champions League third qualifying round (Note: Olympiacos, as one of the two clubs with the highest club coefficient that would otherwise have entered the League Path second qualifying round, will enter the League Path third qualifying round, due to the rebalancing of the default access list.)
3	PAOK	32	18	10	4	59	25	+34	64	Qualification for the Europa League second qualifying round
4	Panathinaikos	32	14	10	8	47	33	+14	52	Qualification for the Conference League second qualifying round

Source: Super League Greece
Rules for classification: 1) Points; 2) Head-to-head points (Regular season and play-off); 3) Head-to-head goal difference (Regular season and play-off); 4) Regular season position.
(C) Champions

==== Results summary ====
Overall								Home						Away					
Pld	W	D	L	GF	GA	GD	Pts	W	D	L	GF	GA	GD	W	D	L	GF	GA	GD
6	2	2	2	6	6	0	8	1	1	1	2	2	0	1	1	1	4	4	0

==== Results by matchday ====
Matchday	1	2	3	4	5	6
Ground	H	A	A	H	H	A
Result	L	W	L	D	W	D
Position	3	2	3	3	2	2

A = Away; H = Home; W = Win; D = Draw; L = Loss

==== Play-off matches ====
Win Draw Loss

5 April 2026 1	Olympiacos	0–1	AEK Athens	Piraeus
21:00 EEST	García (yellow card) 34'		Koïta 5'; Pereyra (yellow card) 31'; Penrice (yellow card) 67'	Stadium: Karaiskakis Stadium; Attendance: 32,850; Referee: Tobias Stieler (Germany)

19 April 2026 2	Panathinaikos	0–2	Olympiacos	Athens
21:00 EEST	Tetteh (yellow card) 12'; Kyriakopoulos (yellow card) 67'; Hernández (yellow card) 69'; Bakasetas (yellow card) 90+7'	Report	Ortega (yellow card) 9'; Martins 33'; Rodinei 45+1'; Costinha (yellow card) 68'; Hezze (yellow card) 90+6'	Stadium: Leoforos Alexandras Stadium; Attendance: 12,100; Referee: Halil Umut Meler (TUR)

3 May 2026 3	PAOK	3–1	Olympiacos	Thessaloniki
19:00 EEST	Jeremejeff 15', 65'; Zafeiris (yellow card) 45'; Živković 55'	Report	El Kaabi 29'; Ortega (yellow card) 43'	Stadium: Toumba Stadium; Attendance: 17.705; Referee: Simone Sozza (ITA)

10 May 2026 4	Olympiacos	1–1	PAOK	Piraeus
19:30 EEST	Pirola (yellow card) 52'; Rodinei 61'	Report	Rahman (yellow card) 52'; Meïté (yellow card) 52'; Konstantelias 69'; Zafeiris (yellow card) 80'; Jeremejeff (yellow card) 89'; Bianco (yellow card) 90+5'; Živković (yellow card) 90+7'	Stadium: Karaiskakis Stadium; Attendance: 32,005; Referee: José María Sánchez Martínez (ESP)

13 May 2026 5	Olympiacos	1–0	Panathinaikos	Piraeus
19:30 EEST	Rodinei 45+5'; Costinha (yellow card) 50'; Scipioni (yellow card) 87'	Report	Pedro Chirivella} (yellow card) 90+1'	Stadium: Karaiskakis Stadium; Attendance: 30,500; Referee: Rade Obrenović (Slovenia)

17 May 2026 6	AEK Athens	1–1	Olympiacos	Nea Filadelfeia
19:30 EEST	Jović (yellow card) 27'; Moukoudi (yellow card) 43'; Koïta 72'; Rota (yellow card) 90'	Report	Rodinei 41' (yellow card) 68'; Pirola (yellow card) 74'	Stadium: Agia Sophia Stadium; Attendance: 22.152; Referee: Andrea Colombo (ITA)

=== Greek Football Cup ===
==== League phase ====
Pos	Team	Pld	W	D	L	GF	GA	GD	Pts	Qualification
1	Olympiacos	4	4	0	0	18	3	+15	12	Advance to Quarter-finals
2	Levadiakos	4	4	0	0	10	3	+7	12	Advance to Quarter-finals
3	AEK Athens	4	4	0	0	6	1	+5	12	Advance to Quarter-finals
4	Panathinaikos	4	4	0	0	6	2	+4	12	Advance to Quarter-finals
5	Aris	4	3	1	0	6	2	+4	10	Advance to Play-offs (seeded)

Updated to match(es) played on 17 December 2025. Source: epo.gr

Round	1	2	3	4	5
Ground	-	A	H	A	H
Result	-	W	W	W	W
Position	10	8	5	4	1

A = Away; H = Home; W = Win; D = Draw; L = Loss

Win Draw Loss Fixtures

24 September 2025 2	Asteras Tripolis	1–2	Olympiacos	Tripoli
17:00 EEST	Pomonis (yellow card) 56'; Kaltsas (yellow card) 68'; Emmanouilidis 90+4'	Report	Taremi 13' (pen.), 18'; García (yellow card) 23'; Bruno (yellow card) 49'; Biancone (yellow card) 69'; Mancha (yellow card) 76'; Podence (yellow card) 90'	Stadium: Theodoros Kolokotronis Stadium; Referee: Ioannis Papadopoulos

29 October 2025 3	Olympiacos	5–0	Volos	Piraeus
17:30 EET	Biancone 5', 45+2' (yellow card) 60'; Yaremchuk 43', 44'; Scipioni (yellow card) 48'; Yazıcı 67' (pen.)	Report	Sinanaj (yellow card) 58'; Grosdis (yellow card) 77'	Stadium: Karaiskakis Stadium; Referee: Spyridon Zampalas

3 December 2025 4	Hellas Syros	2–5	Olympiacos	Syros
13:00 EET	Vernardos 51', 78'	Report	Yazıcı 25', 61'; Taremi 48'; Mancha (yellow card) 70'; Yaremchuk 84'; El Kaabi 90+1'	Stadium: Municipal Stadium of Ermoupolis; Referee: Konstantinos Katoikos

17 December 2025 5	Olympiacos	6–0	Iraklis	Piraeus
18:00 EET	Yazıcı 12'; Kalogeropoulos 21'; Rodinei 40'; Chiquinho 45'; Yaremchuk 51'; Retsos 70'	Report		Stadium: Karaiskakis Stadium; Referee: Alexandros Katsikogiannis

==== Quarter-finals ====
14 January 2026	Olympiacos	0–2	PAOK	Piraeus
18:30 EET	Costinha (yellow card) 27'; Biancone (yellow card) 59'; Rodinei (yellow card) 87'	Report	Mythou 7'; Ozdoyev 15'; Taison (yellow card) 53'; Konstantelias (yellow card) 61'; Zafeiris (yellow card) 88'	Stadium: Karaiskakis Stadium; Referee: Alexandros Tsakalidis

=== Greek Super Cup ===
3 January 2026	Olympiacos	3–0 (a.e.t.)	OFI	Heraklion
20:00 EET	Hezze (yellow card) 60'; Martins (yellow card) 90+10'; Taremi 95' (pen.); Kalogeropoulos 107'; Yazıcı 113'	Report	Salcedo (yellow card) 38'; Androutsos (yellow card) 42'; Apostolakis (yellow card) 47'; Kostoulas (yellow card) 93'; Lampropoulos (yellow card) 100'; Neira (yellow card) 119'	Stadium: Pankritio Stadium; Attendance: 16,471; Referee: Alexandros Tsakalidis (Chalkidiki)

=== UEFA Champions League ===
==== League phase ====
Pos	Team	Pld	W	D	L	GF	GA	GD	Pts	Qualification
16	(German Football Association) Bayer Leverkusen	8	3	3	2	13	14	−1	12	Advance to knockout phase play-offs (seeded)
17	(German Football Association) Borussia Dortmund	8	3	2	3	19	17	+2	11	Advance to knockout phase play-offs (unseeded)
18	(Hellenic Football Federation) Olympiacos	8	3	2	3	10	14	−4	11	Advance to knockout phase play-offs (unseeded)
19	(Royal Belgian Football Association) Club Brugge	8	3	1	4	15	17	−2	10	Advance to knockout phase play-offs (unseeded)
20	(Turkish Football Federation) Galatasaray	8	3	1	4	9	11	−2	10	Advance to knockout phase play-offs (unseeded)

Source: UEFA
Rules for classification: League phase tiebreakers

Round	1	2	3	4	5	6	7	8
Ground	H	A	A	H	H	A	H	A
Result	D	L	L	D	L	W	W	W
Position	21	29	33	31	33	29	24	18

Source: UEFA
A = Away; H = Home; W = Win; D = Draw; L = Loss

Win Draw Loss Fixtures

17 September 2025 1	Olympiacos (Greece)	0–0	(Cyprus) Pafos	Piraeus, Greece
19:45 EEST	García (yellow card) 20'; Pirola (yellow card) 32'; Taremi (yellow card) 72'	Report	Bruno (yellow card) 15' (yellow-red card) 26'; Langa (yellow card) 88'	Stadium: Karaiskakis Stadium; Attendance: 32,050; Referee: István Kovács (Romania)

1 October 2025 2	Arsenal (England)	2–0	(Greece) Olympiacos	London, England
22:00 EEST	Martinelli 12'; Gabriel (yellow card) 58'; Zubimendi (yellow card) 61'; Rice (yellow card) 78'; Saka 90+2'	Report	Strefezza (yellow card) 90'	Stadium: Emirates Stadium; Attendance: 56,820; Referee: François Letexier (France)

21 October 2025 3	Barcelona (Spain)	6–1	(Greece) Olympiacos	Barcelona, Spain
19:45 EEST	Fermín 7', 39', 76'; Balde (yellow card) 23'; Yamal 68' (pen.); Rashford 74', 79'	Report	Hezze (yellow card) 35' (yellow-red card) 57'; D. García (yellow card) 39'; El Kaabi 54' (pen.); Podence (yellow card) 55'	Stadium: Estadi Olímpic Lluís Companys; Attendance: 46,264; Referee: Urs Schnyder (Switzerland)

4 November 2025 4	Olympiacos (Greece)	1–1	(Netherlands) PSV Eindhoven	Piraeus, Greece
22:00 EET	Martins 17'; Scipioni (yellow card) 89'	Report	Perišić (yellow card) 63'; Pepi 90+3'	Stadium: Karaiskakis Stadium; Attendance: 32,570; Referee: Clément Turpin (France)

26 November 2025 5	Olympiacos (Greece)	3–4	(Spain) Real Madrid	Piraeus, Greece
22:00 EET	Chiquinho 8'; Ortega (yellow card) 40'; Taremi 52'; El Kaabi 81'	Report	Mbappé 22', 24', 29', 60'; Camavinga (yellow card) 23'; Güler (yellow card) 56'	Stadium: Karaiskakis Stadium; Attendance: 32,325; Referee: Michael Oliver (England)

9 December 2025 6	Kairat (Kazakhstan)	0–1	(Greece) Olympiacos	Astana, Kazakhstan
17:30 EET	Tuyakbayev (yellow card) 70'	Report	Hezze (yellow card) 14'; Biancone (yellow card) 35'; Martins 73'	Stadium: Astana Arena; Attendance: 19,463; Referee: Juan Martínez Munuera (Spain)

20 January 2026 7	Olympiacos (Greece)	2–0	(Germany) Bayer Leverkusen	Piraeus, Greece
22:00 EET	Costinha 2'; Retsos (yellow card) 5'; Taremi 45+1' (yellow card) 73'	Report	Kofane (yellow card) 29'	Stadium: Karaiskakis Stadium; Attendance: 32,400; Referee: Maurizio Mariani (Italy)

28 January 2026 8	Ajax (Netherlands)	1–2	(Greece) Olympiacos	Amsterdam, Netherlands
22:00 EET	Dolberg 69' (pen.)	Report	Costinha (yellow card) 45+1'; Hezze (yellow card) 49' (goal) 79'; Martins 52'	Stadium: Johan Cruyff Arena; Referee: François Letexier (France)

==== Knockout phase play-offs ====
18 February 2026 First leg	Olympiacos (Greece)	0–2	(Germany) Bayer Leverkusen	Piraeus, Greece
22:00 EET	El Kaabi (yellow card) 13'	Report	García (yellow card) 14'; Schick 60', 63'	Stadium: Karaiskakis Stadium; Attendance: 32,300; Referee: João Pinheiro (Portugal)

24 February 2026 Second leg	Bayer Leverkusen (Germany)	0–0 (2–0 agg.)	(Greece) Olympiacos	Leverkusen, Germnany
22:00 EET		Report	Pirola (yellow card) 90+3'	Stadium: BayArena; Attendance: 30,210; Referee: Michael Oliver (England)

== Squad statistics ==
=== Appearances ===
As of 17 May 2026

No.	Pos.	Nat.	Name	Super League Greece	Greek Cup	Super Cup	UEFA Champions League	Total
No.	Pos.	Nat.	Name	Apps	Apps	Apps	Apps	Apps
88	GK	(Greece)	Konstantinos Tzolakis	32	1	1	9	43
45	DF	(Greece)	Panagiotis Retsos	26	1(1)	1	9	37(1)
22	MF	(Portugal)	Chiquinho	22(8)	2	1	8(2)	33(10)
9	FW	(Morocco)	Ayoub El Kaabi	25(3)	0(2)	0	8(2)	33(7)
5	DF	(Italy)	Lorenzo Pirola	22(1)	0	0	10	32(1)
3	DF	(Argentina)	Francisco Ortega	18(2)	2	1	10	31(2)
32	MF	(Argentina)	Santiago Hezze	21(5)	0(3)	1	8(1)	30(9)
10	MF	(Portugal)	Gelson Martins	19(8)	1	1	9	30(8)
20	DF	(Portugal)	Costinha	22(2)	2(1)	0(1)	4(3)	28(7)
23	DF	(Brazil)	Rodinei	15(7)	1(3)	1	8	27(10)
14	MF	(Spain)	Dani García	18(3)	2(1)	0	6(2)	26(6)
56	MF	(Portugal)	Daniel Podence	16(5)	1(2)	1	7(1)	25(8)
99	FW	(Iran)	Mehdi Taremi	14(10)	3(1)	1	4(5)	22(16)
96	MF	(Greece)	Christos Mouzakitis	10(16)	2	1	7(3)	20(19)
70	DF	(Nigeria)	Bruno Onyemaechi	14(3)	2(1)	0	0(5)	16(9)
4	DF	(France)	Giulian Biancone	10(6)	3	1	1(6)	15(12)
8	MF	(Portugal)	Diogo Nascimento	11(8)	4	0(1)	0(2)	15(11)
16	MF	(Argentina)	Lorenzo Scipioni	9(9)	3	0	0(6)	12(15)
27	MF	(Brazil)	Gabriel Strefezza	7(6)	1(2)	0(1)	1(4)	9(13)
39	DF	(Brazil)	Gustavo Mancha	4	4	0	0	8
97	MF	(Turkey)	Yusuf Yazıcı	2(19)	5	0(1)	0	7(20)
6	DF	(Greece)	Alexis Kalogeropoulos	3(4)	4(1)	0(1)	0	7(6)
17	FW	(Ukraine)	Roman Yaremchuk	2(8)	3(1)	0(1)	0(1)	5(11)
90	MF	(France)	Rémy Cabella	3(4)	2(1)	0	0	5(5)
17	MF	(Brazil)	André Luiz	3(5)	0	0	0(2)	3(7)
80	MF	(Greece)	Stavros Pnevmonidis	2	1(1)	0	0(1)	3(2)
1	GK	(Greece)	Alexandros Paschalakis	0	2	0	1	3
31	GK	(Greece)	Nikolaos Botis	0	2	0	0	2
21	DF	(Portugal)	Rúben Vezo	0	1(2)	0	0	1(2)
19	FW	(Brazil)	Clayton	0(6)	0	0	0(1)	0(7)
67	MF	(Greece)	Argyris Liatsikouras	0	0(2)	0	0	0(2)

=== Goalscorers & Assists ===
As of 17 May 2026

No.	Pos.	Nat.	Name	Super League Greece		Greek Cup		Super Cup		Champions League		Total		
No.	Pos.	Nat.	Name	G	A	G	A	G	A	G	A	Goals	Assists	G+A
9	FW	(Morocco)	Ayoub El Kaabi	18	1	1	0	0	0	2	1	21	2	23
99	FW	(Iran)	Mehdi Taremi	10	3	3	0	1	0	2	2	16	5	21
97	MF	(Turkey)	Yusuf Yazıcı	2	2	4	4	1	0	0	0	7	6	13
22	MF	(Portugal)	Chiquinho	4	5	1	0	0	0	1	2	6	7	13
10	MF	(Portugal)	Gelson Martins	3	1	0	0	0	0	3	0	6	1	7
23	DF	(Brazil)	Rodinei	4	3	1	1	0	0	0	2	5	6	11
17	FW	(Ukraine)	Roman Yaremchuk	0	1	4	0	0	0	0	0	4	1	5
45	DF	(Greece)	Panagiotis Retsos	2	0	1	0	0	0	0	0	3	0	3
56	MF	(Portugal)	Daniel Podence	2	6	0	3	0	0	0	0	2	9	11
4	DF	(France)	Giulian Biancone	0	0	2	0	0	0	0	0	2	0	2
6	DF	(Greece)	Alexios Kalogeropoulos	0	0	1	0	1	0	0	0	2	0	2
27	MF	(Brazil)	Gabriel Strefezza	1	1	0	3	0	0	0	1	1	5	6
96	MF	(Greece)	Christos Mouzakitis	1	2	0	0	0	1	0	0	1	3	4
3	DF	(Argentina)	Francisco Ortega	1	3	0	0	0	0	0	0	1	3	4
8	MF	(Portugal)	Diogo Nascimento	1	2	0	1	0	0	0	0	1	3	4
32	MF	(Argentina)	Santiago Hezze	0	1	0	0	0	0	1	1	1	2	3
20	DF	(Portugal)	Costinha	0	0	0	0	0	1	1	0	1	1	2
5	DF	(Italy)	Lorenzo Pirola	1	1	0	0	0	0	0	0	1	1	2
14	MF	(Spain)	Dani García	1	0	0	0	0	0	0	0	1	0	1
90	MF	(France)	Rémy Cabella	0	1	0	1	0	0	0	0	0	2	2

== Individual awards ==
Name	Pos.	Award
(Portugal) Chiquinho	Central Midfielder	Super League Greece Player of the Month August 2025; Super League Greece Player of the Month September 2025
