= Retsos =

Retsos is a surname. Notable people with the surname include:

- Christos Retsos (born 2001), Greek footballer
- Panagiotis Retsos (born 1998), Greek footballer
