= Rodinei =

Brazilian footballer

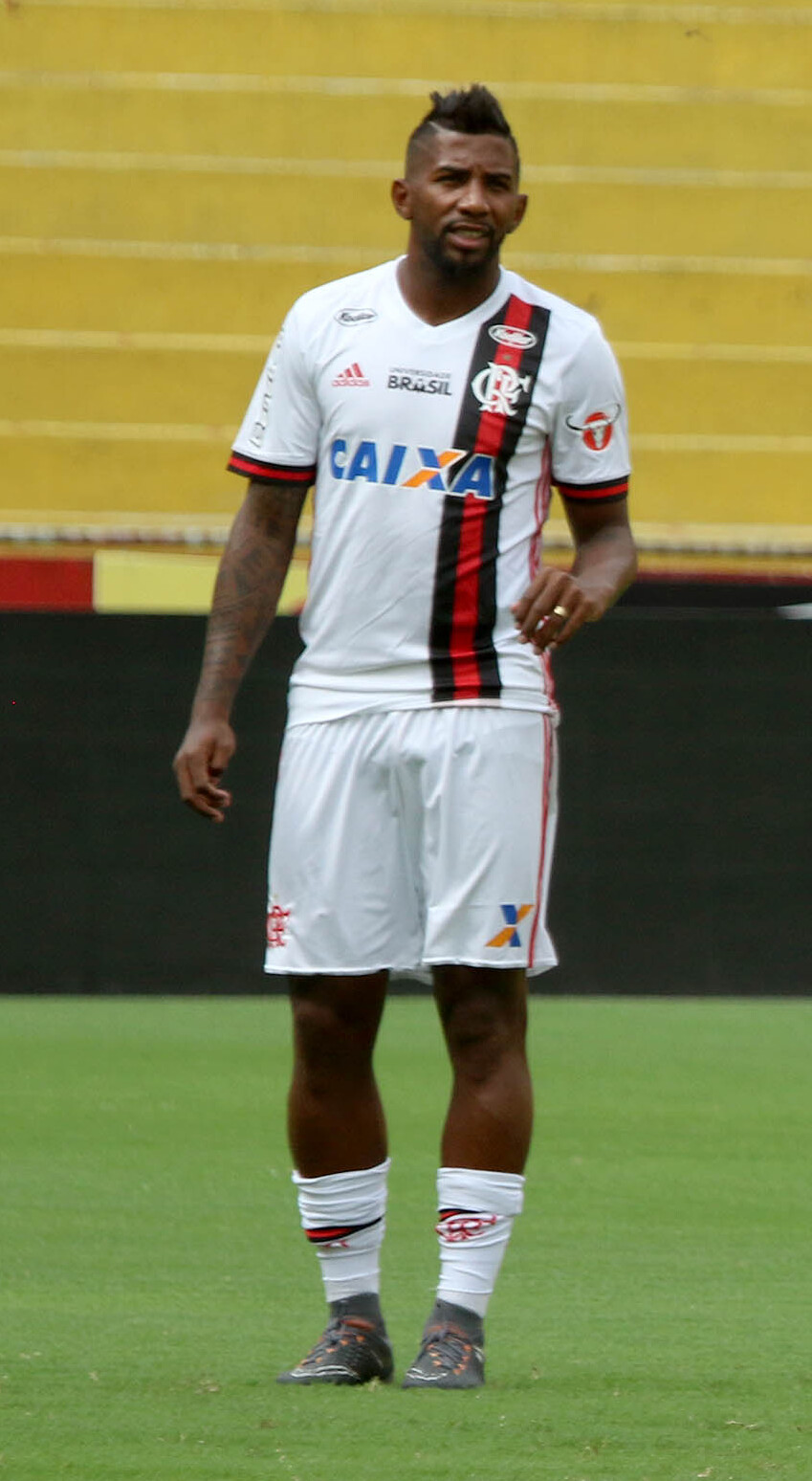
- Rodinei training with Flamengo in 2018

Personal information
- Full name: Rodinei Marcelo de Almeida
- Date of birth: 29 January 1992 (age 34)
- Place of birth: Tatuí, Brazil
- Height: 1.77 m (5 ft 10 in)
- Position: Right-back

Team information
- Current team: Santos
- Number: 23

Youth career
- 2011–2012: Avaí

Senior career*
Years	Team	Apps	(Gls)
2009	Videira		
2010	Porto-SC		
2011–2014	Avaí	0	(0)
2012	→ Marcílio Dias (loan)	7	(0)
2012–2013	→ Corinthians (loan)	1	(0)
2013	→ CRAC (loan)	17	(0)
2014	→ Penapolense (loan)	16	(0)
2014	→ Ponte Preta (loan)	22	(2)
2015	SEV Hortolândia	0	(0)
2015	→ Ponte Preta (loan)	51	(0)
2016–2022	Flamengo	156	(6)
2020–2021	→ Internacional (loan)	37	(2)
2023–2026	Olympiacos	105	(10)
2026–	Santos	10	(0)
- * Club domestic league appearances and goals as of 18 November 2026

Rodinei Marcelo de Almeida (born 29 January 1992), simply known as Rodinei, is a Brazilian professional footballer who plays as a right-back for Campeonato Brasileiro Série A club Santos.

== Early life ==
Born in Tatuí, São Paulo, Rodinei's father died before his birth, and his mother was deceased due to a brain tumor in 2002, turning him into an orphan at the age of only ten. He was then raised by his grandmother until her passing three years later, and went on to live with an uncle who were struggling with drug addiction.

== Career ==
=== Early career ===
After training in social projects in his hometown, Rodinei started his career at the age of 17 with Videira Esporte Clube in the Campeonato Catarinense Série B. He moved to fellow league team Porto União in 2010, and had failed trials at Figueirense and Vitória before signing a professional contract with Avaí in 2011.

Initially a member of the under-20 squad, Rodinei was an unused substitute in a 3–1 away loss to Santos on 5 June 2011, and had his deal with Avaí renewed until 2015 afterwards. On 24 February 2012, he was loaned to Marcílio Dias for the year's Campeonato Catarinense, and made his senior debut two days later, in a 2–1 win over Atlético Ibirama.

On 22 May 2012, Rodinei joined Corinthians on loan for one year. A third-choice behind Alessandro and Guilherme Andrade, he made his Série A debut on 17 October, coming on as a late substitute for Willian Arão in a 2–0 away loss against Cruzeiro; it was his only appearance for the club before departing in March 2013.

On 3 May 2013, Rodinei extended his contract with Avaí and was immediately loaned to CRAC until the end of the year, being a regular starter in the club's Série C run. He then moved to Penapolense also in a temporary deal for the 2014 Campeonato Paulista, being an undisputed first-choice as his side reached the quarterfinals of the competition.

=== Ponte Preta ===
On 1 July 2014, Rodinei signed for Ponte Preta on loan until the end of the year. He scored his first professional goal in only his second match for the club, in a 2–0 home defeat of Joinville for the Série B championship.

Rodinei contributed with two goals in 22 appearances for the side during his first year, helping in their top tier promotion. On 11 December 2014, he agreed to a new one-year contract with Ponte, now owned by a group of businessmen which assigned his federative rights to SEV Hortolândia. During the 2015 season, he was again an undisputed starter, only missing three league matches as his side achieved a comfortable 11th place.

=== Flamengo ===
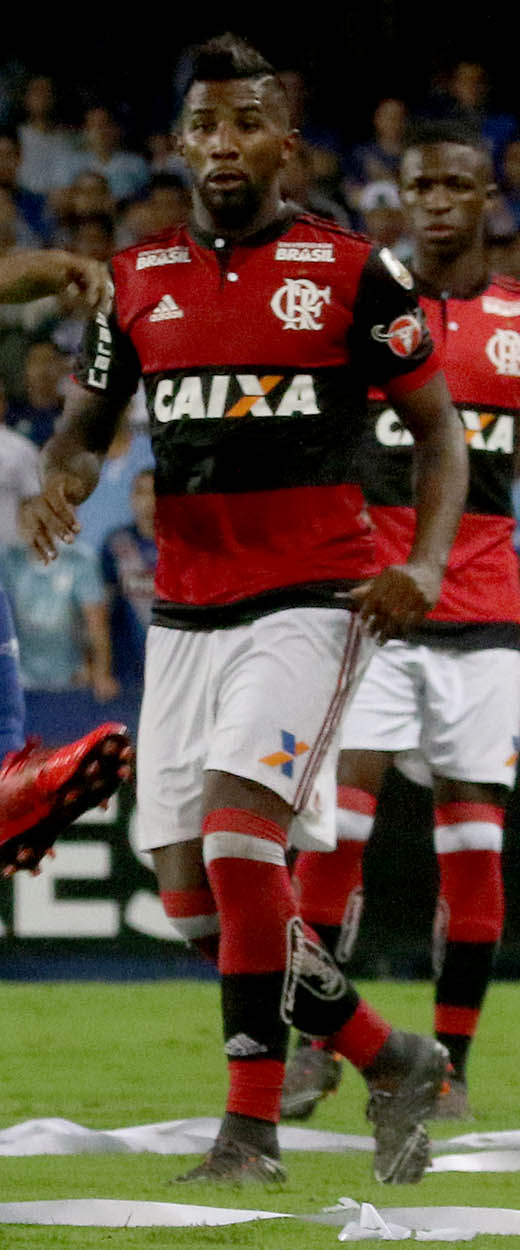
Rodinei with Flamengo in 2017

On 10 December 2015, Flamengo announced the signing of Rodinei for the 2016 season. He made his debut for the club on 30 January, starting in a 1–1 Campeonato Carioca home draw against Boavista.

Rodinei quickly established himself as a first-choice under head coach Muricy Ramalho until July 2016, when an elbow injury sidelined him for a month. Upon returning to action, he saw Pará overtake him as a starter, and then spent the 2017 campaign as a backup.

On 17 July 2018, after regaining his starting spot, Rodinei extended his contract with Fla until December 2022. He then saw his playing time reduce in the following year, mainly after the arrival of Rafinha.

==== Loan to Internacional ====
On 23 December 2019, Flamengo agreed to loan Rodinei to Internacional until the end of the 2020 season with an option to buy at the end of the loan set at €4 million. Regularly used, his loan was extended until May 2021 on 14 July 2020.

Rodinei was sent off during a decisive match against parent club Flamengo on 21 February 2021, which ended in a 2–1 and saw Inter lose the top spot of the 2020 Série A in the penultimate round; initially unavailable to play in that match due to his loan contract, Inter paid a R$ 1 million fee after receiving a donation from a supporter. Despite having a strong start of the 2021 campaign, providing seven assists in 13 matches, the club announced his departure in May, as his buyout clause would not be activated.

==== Return from loan ====
Back to Flamengo on 2 June 2021, Rodinei acted mainly as a backup to Mauricio Isla during the remainder of the year. In 2022, he became an undisputed starter after the arrival of Dorival Júnior as head coach, helping the club to win both the 2022 Copa do Brasil and 2022 Copa Libertadores titles, also converting the decisive penalty in the shootout of the former's final.

=== Olympiacos ===
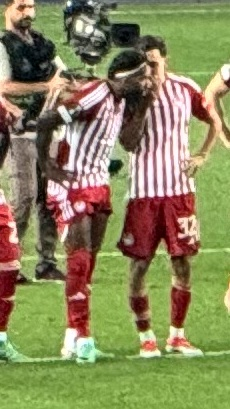
Rodinei (left) with Olympiacos in 2024

On 11 December 2022, Rodinei moved abroad for the first time in his career, joining Greek side Olympiacos on a two-and-a-half-year contract. He made his club debut the following 3 January, starting in a 2–0 Super League Greece win over Ionikos, and scored his first goal on 1 October 2023, in a 3–0 away success over PAS Giannina.

In September 2024, after also acting as team captain in some matches, Rodinei signed a contract extension with the club, keeping him at the club until June 2027. In the 2025–26 season, he was also deployed as a right winger on several matches.

On 2 September 2026, Olympacos announced Rodinei's departure.

=== Santos ===
Immediately after leaving Olympiacos, Rodinei returned to Brazil after being announced at top tier side Santos, on a contract until December 2027. He made his club debut on 9 September 2026, starting in a 2–0 home win over Atlético Mineiro for the 2026 Copa Sudamericana.

== Career statistics ==
As of match played 18 November 2026

Appearances and goals by club, season and competition
Club	Season	League			State league (Note: Includes Campeonato Catarinense, Campeonato Paulista, Campeonato Carioca, Campeonato Gaúcho)		National cup (Note: Includes Copa do Brasil, Greek Cup)		Continental		Other		Total	
Club	Season	Division	Apps	Goals	Apps	Goals	Apps	Goals	Apps	Goals	Apps	Goals	Apps	Goals
Avaí	2011	Série A	0	0	—		—		—		—		0	0
Avaí	2012	Série B	0	0	0	0	0	0	—		—		0	0
Avaí	Total		0	0	0	0	0	0	—		—		0	0
Marcílio Dias (loan)	2012	Série C	0	0	7	0	—		—		—		7	0
Corinthians (loan)	2012	Série A	1	0	—		0	0	—		—		1	0
CRAC (loan)	2013	Série C	17	0	—		3	0	—		—		20	0
Penapolense (loan)	2014	Paulista	—		16	0	—		—		—		16	0
Ponte Preta	2014	Série B	22	2	—		—		—		—		22	2
Ponte Preta	2015	Série A	35	0	16	0	1	0	—		—		52	0
Ponte Preta	Total		57	2	16	0	1	0	—		—		74	2
Flamengo	2016	Série A	13	0	14	1	4	0	2 (Note: Appearances in Copa Sudamericana)	0	3 (Note: Appearances in Primeira Liga)	0	36	1
Flamengo	2017	Série A	19	2	8	1	7	0	5 (Note: Two appearances and two goals in Copa Libertadores, three appearances in Copa Sudamericana)	2	2	0	41	5
Flamengo	2018	Série A	28	1	9	1	5	0	8 (Note: Appearances in Copa Libertadores)	0	—		50	2
Flamengo	2019	Série A	17	0	6	0	2	0	2	0	0	0	27	0
Flamengo	2021	Série A	18	0	0	0	4	1	1	0	—		23	1
Flamengo	2022	Série A	16	0	8	0	10	0	11	0	1 (Note: Appearance in Supercopa do Brasil)	0	46	0
Flamengo	Total		111	3	45	3	32	1	29	2	6	0	223	9
Internacional (loan)	2020	Série A	23	0	5	0	3	1	8	0	—		39	1
Internacional (loan)	2021	Série A	0	0	9	2	0	0	4	0	—		13	2
Internacional (loan)	Total		23	0	14	2	3	1	12	0	—		52	3
Olympiacos	2022–23	Super League Greece	19	0	—		3	0	—		—		22	0
Olympiacos	2023–24	Super League Greece	30	2	—		2	0	18 (Note: Nine appearances in UEFA Europa League, nine appearances and one goal in UEFA Conference League)	1	—		50	3
Olympiacos	2024–25	Super League Greece	29	4	—		6	0	10 (Note: Appearances in UEFA Europa League)	0	—		45	4
Olympiacos	2025–26	Super League Greece	24	4	—		4	1	8 (Note: Appearances in UEFA Champions League)	0	1 (Note: Appearance in Greek Super Cup)	0	37	5
Olympiacos	2026–27	Super League Greece	1	0	—		0	0	2	0	—		3	0
Olympiacos	Total		105	10	—		15	1	38	1	1	0	157	12
Santos	2026	Série A	10	0	—		—		2	0	—		12	0
Career total			333	15	104	5	53	4	84	3	7	0	576	26

== Honours ==
Flamengo

- Série A: 2019
- Copa do Brasil: 2022
- Copa Libertadores: 2019, 2022
- Campeonato Carioca: 2017, 2019
- FIFA Club World Cup runner-up: 2019

Olympiacos

- Super League Greece: 2024–25
- Greek Football Cup: 2024–25
- UEFA Conference League: 2023–24
- Greek Super Cup: 2025

Individual

- Campeonato Carioca Team of the Year: 2016
- Troféu Mesa Redonda Team of the Year: 2018, 2022
- Campeonato Gaúcho Team of the Year: 2021
- Super League Greece Team of the Season: 2022–23, 2023–24
- Super League Greece top assist provider: 2024–25
