= Gelson Martins =

Portuguese footballer (born 1995)

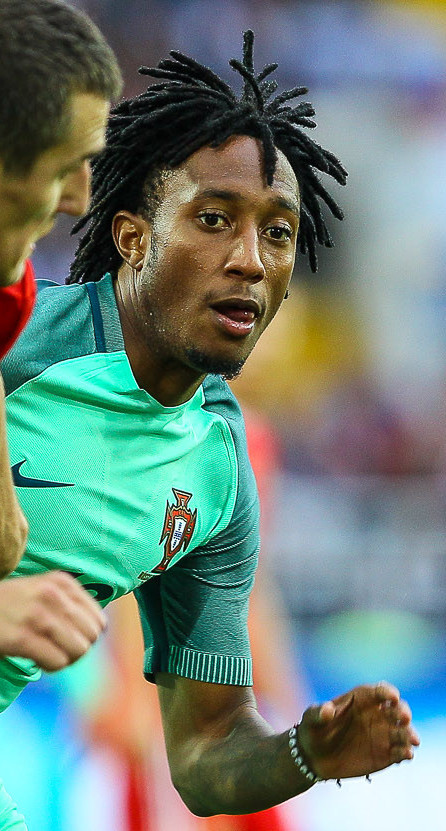
- Martins with Portugal at the 2017 Confederations Cup

Personal information
- Full name: Gelson Dany Batalha Martins
- Date of birth: 11 May 1995 (age 31)
- Place of birth: Praia, Cape Verde
- Height: 1.73 m (5 ft 8 in)
- Position: Winger

Team information
- Current team: Olympiacos
- Number: 10

Youth career
- 2008–2010: Futebol Benfica
- 2010–2014: Sporting CP

Senior career*
Years	Team	Apps	(Gls)
2014–2015	Sporting CP B	40	(6)
2015–2018	Sporting CP	92	(18)
2018–2019	Atlético Madrid	8	(0)
2019	→ Monaco (loan)	16	(4)
2019–2024	Monaco	87	(11)
2024–	Olympiacos	77	(13)

International career
2012–2013	Portugal U18	10	(0)
2013–2014	Portugal U19	21	(7)
2014–2015	Portugal U20	9	(3)
2015–2017	Portugal U21	5	(2)
2016	Portugal U23	1	(1)
2016–2018	Portugal	21	(0)
Medal record
Men's football
Representing Portugal
FIFA Confederations Cup
Third place	2017 Russia
UEFA European Under-19 Championship
Runner-up	2014 Hungary
- * Club domestic league appearances and goals as of 20:55, 22 November 2026 (UTC)

Gelson Dany Batalha Martins (Portuguese pronunciation: [ˈʒɛlsɐ̃ mɐɾˈtĩʃ]; born 11 May 1995) is a professional footballer who plays as a winger for Super League Greece club Olympiacos.

He began his career at Sporting CP, appearing in 140 competitive matches and winning two trophies during his three-year tenure. In 2018, he signed with Atlético Madrid and, the following year, joined Monaco, initially on loan. He moved to Olympiacos in January 2024, notably winning the 2024–25 Super League Greece.

Born in Cape Verde, Martins was a Portugal international since 2016, and was part of the squads at the 2018 FIFA World Cup and the 2017 FIFA Confederations Cup.

== Club career ==
=== Sporting CP ===
Born in Praia, Cape Verde, Martins moved to Portugal in his teens and played youth football with C.F. Benfica and Sporting CP. In March 2014, he was promoted to the B team of the latter and signed a contract lasting until 2019 and which included a release clause of €45 million. During his youth spell, his goal against C.F. União de Coimbra earned the praise of many, even though his coach at Sporting B had previously said that he was being "harmed" by not playing in his preferred position as winger.

Martins made his professional debut on 24 August 2014, coming on as a late substitute for Lewis Enoh in a 1–0 away win against S.C. Olhanense in the Segunda Liga. On 21 December, he scored his first goal in the competition, contributing to a 3–1 victory at Vitória S.C. B.

In summer 2015, Martins was promoted to the main squad by new manager Jorge Jesus. He made his competitive debut on 9 August, playing injury time in a 1–0 win over S.L. Benfica in the Supertaça Cândido de Oliveira.

Martins first appeared in the Primeira Liga on 14 August 2015, playing one minute in a 2–1 defeat of newly promoted C.D. Tondela. On 15 January of the following year, against the same opponent, he scored Sporting's 5,000th goal in the competition, putting the hosts ahead in an eventual 2–2 draw.

On 11 June 2018, Martins requested that his contract with Sporting be terminated following an incident in May in which a group of around 50 supporters invaded the club's training centre and assaulted several players and staff members.

=== Atlético Madrid ===
On 18 July 2018, Martins accepted an offer from Atlético Madrid. One week later, he was announced as a new player of the Spanish club after agreeing to a five-year deal on a free transfer. Sporting made an official complaint to FIFA over the transfer demanding compensation of €100 million, the release clause of his cancelled contract, and in May 2019 announced it had reached an agreement worth €22.5 million for the unlawful signing.

Martins made his La Liga debut on 20 August 2018 in a 1–1 away draw with Valencia CF, where he played 18 minutes in place of Antoine Griezmann. Two months later, in a 1–0 victory against amateurs UE Sant Andreu in the round of 32 of the Copa del Rey, he scored his first goal.

During his spell at the Metropolitano Stadium, Martins was sparingly played by coach Diego Simeone.

=== Monaco ===
On 27 January 2019, Martins joined AS Monaco FC on loan until the end of the season. He made his first Ligue 1 appearance on 2 February, providing an assist for Aleksandr Golovin early in the first half and also being involved in Cesc Fàbregas' goal in the 2–1 home victory over Toulouse FC.

In July 2019, Martins joined Monaco outright after signing a five-year contract. The following 1 February, at the 30-minute mark of an away fixture against Nîmes Olympique, he repeatedly pushed referee Mikael Lesage in retaliation for his teammate Tiémoué Bakayoko's ejection seconds before, and was too sent off as his team eventually lost 3–1. For his actions, he was issued a six-month suspension on 5 March.

Martins took part in no competitive games in the first half of the 2023–24 campaign.

=== Olympiacos ===
Martins moved to the Super League Greece with Olympiacos F.C. on 2 January 2024, agreeing to a deal until June 2026 for a reported fee of €3 million. He won the double in his first full season, scoring seven goals in the league.

== International career ==
Martins was in the Portugal squad for the 2014 UEFA European Under-19 Championship, playing all the matches en route to a runner-up finish in Hungary. He also represented the nation at the 2015 FIFA U-20 World Cup, scoring in the group stage against Senegal and in the round of 16 against hosts New Zealand in an eventual quarter-final exit.

In late September 2016, Martins got his first call up to the senior team, for 2018 FIFA World Cup qualifiers against Andorra and the Faroe Islands. He won his first cap against the former, replacing Pepe for the last 18 minutes of the 6–0 win in Aveiro.

Martins was picked by manager Fernando Santos for his 2018 FIFA World Cup squad. He made his debut in the competition on 20 June, playing roughly 30 minutes in the 1–0 group stage defeat of Morocco after replacing Bernardo Silva.

== Style of play ==
Mainly a winger on both flanks, Martins can also operate as a right-back, a trait which cemented his place in the junior national teams.

== Personal life ==
Martins' cousin, Euclides Cabral, is also a footballer.

== Career statistics ==
=== Club ===
As of match played 5 September 2026

Appearances and goals by club, season and competition
Club	Season	League			National cup (Note: Includes Taça de Portugal, Copa del Rey, Coupe de France, Greek Football Cup)		League cup (Note: Includes Taça da Liga, Coupe de la Ligue)		Europe		Other		Total	
Club	Season	Division	Apps	Goals	Apps	Goals	Apps	Goals	Apps	Goals	Apps	Goals	Apps	Goals
Sporting CP B	2014–15	Segunda Liga	40	6	—		—		—		—		40	6
Sporting CP	2014–15	Primeira Liga	0	0	0	0	2	0	0	0	—		2	0
Sporting CP	2015–16	Primeira Liga	29	4	3	1	2	1	7 (Note: One appearance in UEFA Champions League, six appearances and one goal in UEFA Europa League)	1	1 (Note: Appearance in Supertaça Cândido de Oliveira)	0	42	7
Sporting CP	2016–17	Primeira Liga	32	6	4	0	2	1	6 (Note: Appearances in UEFA Champions League)	0	—		44	7
Sporting CP	2017–18	Primeira Liga	31	8	5	1	3	1	13 (Note: Eight appearances and two goals in UEFA Champions League, five appearances and one goal in UEFA Europa League)	3	—		52	13
Sporting CP	Total		92	18	12	2	9	3	26	4	1	0	140	27
Atlético Madrid	2018–19	La Liga	8	0	2	1	—		2	0	0	0	12	1
Monaco (loan)	2018–19	Ligue 1	16	4	—		1	0	—		—		17	4
Monaco	2019–20	Ligue 1	21	4	2	0	0	0	—		—		23	4
Monaco	2020–21	Ligue 1	23	3	4	0	—		—		—		27	3
Monaco	2021–22	Ligue 1	32	4	5	0	—		10 (Note: Four appearances and one goal in UEFA Champions League, six appearances in UEFA Europa League)	1	—		47	5
Monaco	2022–23	Ligue 1	11	0	1	0	—		3 (Note: Two appearances in UEFA Champions League, one appearance in UEFA Europa League)	0	—		15	0
Monaco	Total		103	15	12	0	1	0	13	1	0	0	129	16
Olympiacos	2023–24	Super League Greece	14	2	1	0	—		0	0	—		15	2
Olympiacos	2024–25	Super League Greece	26	7	5	0	—		7 (Note: Appearances in UEFA Europa League)	0	—		38	7
Olympiacos	2025–26	Super League Greece	27	3	1	0	—		9	3	1 (Note: Appearance in Greek Super Cup)	0	38	6
Olympiacos	2026–27	Super League Greece	3	0	1	0	—		2	0	—		6	0
Olympiacos	Total		70	12	8	0	0	0	18	3	1	0	97	15
Career total			313	51	34	3	10	3	59	8	2	0	418	65

=== International ===
Appearances and goals by national team and year
National team	Year	Apps	Goals
Portugal	2016	3	0
Portugal	2017	12	0
Portugal	2018	6	0
Total		21	0

== Honours ==
Sporting CP

- Taça da Liga: 2017–18
- Supertaça Cândido de Oliveira: 2015

Atlético Madrid

- UEFA Super Cup: 2018

Olympiacos

- Super League Greece: 2024–25
- Greek Football Cup: 2024–25
- Greek Super Cup: 2025

Portugal

- FIFA Confederations Cup third place: 2017

Individual

- SJPF Primeira Liga Team of the Year: 2015–16, 2016–17
- Super League Greece Team of the Season: 2024–25, 2025–26
- UEFA Europa League Squad of the Season: 2017–18
- UEFA European Under-19 Championship Team of the Tournament: 2014
