= Diogo Nascimento =

Portuguese footballer

Personal information
- Full name: Diogo André Santos Nascimento
- Date of birth: 2 November 2002 (age 24)
- Place of birth: Leiria, Portugal
- Height: 1.66 m (5 ft 5 in)
- Position: Central midfielder

Team information
- Current team: Rio Ave (on loan from Olympiacos)
- Number: 90

Youth career
- 2010–2012: Sporting CP
- 2012–2014: Belenenses
- 2014–2022: Benfica

Senior career*
Years	Team	Apps	(Gls)
2022–2023	Benfica B	7	(0)
2023–2025	Vizela	69	(1)
2025–	Olympiacos	19	(1)
2026–	→ Rio Ave (loan)	6	(0)

International career^{‡}
2019–2020	Portugal U18	4	(0)
2021–2022	Portugal U20	5	(0)
2025	Portugal U21	6	(0)
- * Club domestic league appearances and goals as of 1 November 2026 ‡ National team caps and goals as of 21 June 2025

Diogo André Santos Nascimento (born 2 November 2002) is a Portuguese professional footballer who plays as a central midfielder for Primeira Liga club Rio Ave, on loan from Olympiacos.

== Club career ==
Having played for both Sporting CP and Belenenses, Nascimento joined Benfica in 2014. He signed his first professional contract in July 2021.

In June 2023, Nascimento signed a two-year contract with Primeira Liga club Vizela. On 23 January 2024, after having made 22 appearances in all competitions for the main team, he signed a contract extension until June 2027.

== International career ==
Nascimento has represented Portugal at youth international level.

== Career statistics ==
As of match played 3 January 2026

Appearances and goals by club, season and competition
Club	Season	League			National cup (Note: Includes Taça de Portugal, Greek Football Cup)		League cup (Note: Includes Taça da Liga)		Continental		Other		Total	
Club	Season	Division	Apps	Goals	Apps	Goals	Apps	Goals	Apps	Goals	Apps	Goals	Apps	Goals
Benfica B	2021–22	Liga Portugal 2	3	0	—		—		—		—		3	0
Benfica B	2022–23	Liga Portugal 2	4	0	—		—		—		—		4	0
Benfica B	Total		7	0	—		—		—		—		7	0
Vizela	2023–24	Primeira Liga	34	0	4	0	1	0	—		—		39	0
Vizela	2024–25	Liga Portugal 2	35	1	1	0	—		—		—		36	1
Vizela	Total		69	1	5	0	1	0	—		—		75	1
Olympiacos	2025–26	Super League Greece	17	1	4	0	—		2 (Note: Appearances in UEFA Champions League)	0	1 (Note: Appearance in Greek Super Cup)	0	24	1
Career total			93	2	9	0	1	0	2	0	1	0	106	2

== Honours ==
Benfica Youth

- Under-20 Intercontinental Cup: 2022

Olympiacos

- Greek Super Cup: 2025

Individual

- Liga Portugal 2 Player of the Month: January 2025, February 2025, March 2025, April 2025
- Liga Portugal 2 Midfielder of the Month: January 2025, February 2025, March 2025, April 2025
- Liga Portugal 2 Player of the Season: 2024–25
- Liga Portugal 2 Team of the Season: 2024–25
- Liga Portugal 2 Young Player of the Season: 2024–25
