= Francisco Ortega (footballer, born 1999) =

Argentine footballer

Personal information
- Full name: Francisco Gabriel Ortega
- Date of birth: 19 March 1999 (age 27)
- Place of birth: Santa Rosa de Lima, Santa Fe, Argentina
- Height: 1.77 m (5 ft 10 in)
- Position: Left-back

Team information
- Current team: River Plate

Youth career
- 2013–2017: Vélez Sarsfield

Senior career*
Years	Team	Apps	(Gls)
2017–2023	Vélez Sarsfield	84	(3)
2023–2026	Olympiacos	67	(1)
2026–	River Plate	1	(0)

International career
2018–2019	Argentina U20	12	(0)
2019–2021	Argentina U23	5	(0)
- * Club domestic league appearances and goals as of 17 May 2026 (UTC)

Francisco Gabriel Ortega (born 19 March 1999), also known as Pancho Ortega, is an Argentine professional footballer who plays as a left-back for Argentine Primera División club River Plate.

== Club career ==
Ortega's career began in Vélez Sarsfield's youth system, originally arriving in 2013. He made his senior professional debut for the club in November 2017, during a 3–0 home victory over Olimpo. Throughout the rest of the 2017–18 campaign, Ortega made ten further league appearances.

== International career ==
June 2017 saw Ortega train with the Argentina national team in Australia and Singapore. In 2018, Ortega received a call-up for the Argentina U20s for friendlies with England U18s and Real Madrid Castilla. He played the full duration of a 2–1 defeat to England on 23 March. In December, Ortega was selected for the 2019 South American U-20 Championship. After appearing six times in Chile, Ortega was called up for the 2019 FIFA U-20 World Cup in Poland. In the succeeding September, Ortega was picked by the U23s ahead of a friendly with Bolivia. In Argentina's opening match of the 2021 Olympic Games Ortega was sent off after receiving a second yellow card.

== Career statistics ==
As of match played 17 September 2025

Appearances and goals by club, season and competition
Club	Season	League			National cup (Note: Includes Copa Argentina, Greek Football Cup)		League cup		Continental		Other		Total	
Club	Season	Division	Apps	Goals	Apps	Goals	Apps	Goals	Apps	Goals	Apps	Goals	Apps	Goals
Vélez Sarsfield	2017–18	Argentine Primera División	11	0	1	0	—		—		—		12	0
Vélez Sarsfield	2018–19	Argentine Primera División	4	0	1	0	—		—		—		5	0
Vélez Sarsfield	2019–20	Argentine Primera División	5	0	2	0	9	0	8	0	—		24	0
Vélez Sarsfield	2021	Argentine Primera División	20	1	0	0	12	0	6	0	—		38	1
Vélez Sarsfield	2022	Argentine Primera División	19	1	3	0	13	0	12	0	—		47	1
Vélez Sarsfield	2023	Argentine Primera División	25	1	2	0	—		—		—		27	1
Vélez Sarsfield	Total		84	3	9	0	31	0	26	0	—		153	3
Olympiacos	2023–24	Super League Greece	23	0	2	0	—		13 (Note: Five appearances in UEFA Europa League, eight appearances in UEFA Conference League)	0	—		38	0
Olympiacos	2024–25	Super League Greece	24	0	3	0	—		9	0	—		36	0
Olympiacos	2025–26	Super League Greece	20	1	2	0	—		10 (Note: Appearances in UEFA Champions League)	0	1	0	33	1
Olympiacos	Total		67	1	7	0	—		32	0	1	0	107	1
Career total			151	4	16	0	33	0	57	0	1	0	258	4

== Honours ==
Olympiacos

- UEFA Conference League: 2023–24
- Super League Greece: 2024–25
- Greek Football Cup: 2024–25
- Greek Super Cup: 2025
