= Gabriel Strefezza =

Brazilian footballer (born 1997)

Personal information
- Full name: Gabriel Tadeu Strefezza Rebelato
- Date of birth: 18 April 1997 (age 29)
- Place of birth: São Paulo, Brazil
- Height: 1.68 m (5 ft 6 in)
- Positions: Forward; midfielder

Team information
- Current team: Palermo
- Number: 7

Youth career
- 2006–2016: Corinthians
- 2016–2017: SPAL

Senior career*
Years	Team	Apps	(Gls)
2017–2021	SPAL	62	(5)
2017–2018	→ Juve Stabia (loan)	32	(3)
2018–2019	→ Cremonese (loan)	23	(1)
2021–2024	Lecce	89	(23)
2024	→ Como (loan)	15	(3)
2024–2025	Como	37	(6)
2025–2026	Olympiacos	14	(1)
2026	→ Parma (loan)	14	(2)
2026–	Palermo	0	(0)
- * Club domestic league appearances and goals as of 7 August 2026

Gabriel Tadeu Strefezza Rebelato (born 18 April 1997), sometimes known as Espeto, is a Brazilian professional footballer who plays as a forward or midfielder for Serie B club Palermo.

== Career ==
=== SPAL ===
Strefezza was born in Brazil and is of Italian descent. He played for the Corinthians youth teams for 10 years, until moving to SPAL in December 2016. On 31 March 2017 Strefezza made his professional debut for SPAL in Serie B as a substitute replacing Paolo Ghiglione in the 79th minute of a 1–0 away defeat against Avellino. He signed his first professional contract with SPAL on 2 May 2017.

==== Loan to Juve Stabia ====
On 10 July 2017, Strefezza and Tommaso Costantini were signed by Serie C side Juve Stabia on a season-long loan deal. On 30 July, Strefezza made his debut with Juve Stabia and he scored his first professional goal in the 47th minute in a 3–1 home win over Bassano Virtus in the first round of Coppa Italia, he played the entire match. On 23 September, Espeto made his Serie C debut for Juve Stabia as a substitute replacing Filippo Berardi in the 68th minute of a 2–1 away win over Paganese. On 3 October he played his first match as a starter for Juve Stabia in Serie C, a 1–0 away defeat against Bisceglie. On 3 December, he scored his first Serie C goal in the 53rd minute of a 2–2 home draw against Casertana. On 21 January 2018 he played his first entire match for the club, a 1–1 home draw against Catanzaro. On 11 March, he scored his second goal in the league in the 39th minute of a 7–0 home win over Akragas. On 22 April he scored his third goal in the 58th minute of a 3–1 away defeat against Casertana. Strefezza ended his loan to Juve Stabia with 36 appearances, four goals and four assists.

==== Loan to Cremonese ====
On 10 July 2018, Strefezza was loaned to Serie B club Cremonese with an option to buy. On 5 August he made his debut for Cremonese as a substitute replacing Gaetano Castrovilli in the 66th minute of a match lost 4–2 at penalties after a 2–2 draw against Pisa in the second round of Coppa Italia. On 31 August he made his Serie B debut as a substitute replacing Giampietro Perrulli in the 64th minute and in the same minute he scored his first goal for the club. On 23 September, he played his first match as a starter for Cremonese, a 1–1 away draw against Padova, he was replaced by Paulinho in the 60th minute. On 22 December he played his first entire match for the club, a 2–1 home defeat against Carpi. On 10 March 2019, he was sent-off with a double yellow card, as a substitute, in the 91st minute of a 1–0 home win over Benevento. Strefezza ended his loan to Cremonese with 24 appearances and one goal.

==== Return to SPAL ====
Strefezza returned to SPAL for the Serie A 2019/2020 season, making his debut on the pitch as a substitute in the team's third game, and first win, against Lazio. His contract with the club was renewed the day after, until 30 June 2022. On 21 December 2019 he scored his first goal in Serie A in 2–1 away win against Torino.

=== Lecce ===
On 12 August 2021, Strefezza joined Lecce on a permanent basis. He was one of the key figures in the 2021–22 Serie B season, contributing with 14 goals to Lecce’s successful campaign, crowned with promotion to Serie A.

==== Loan to Como ====
On 29 January 2024, Strefezza moved to Como on a 41-week loan with an obligation to buy.

=== Olympiacos ===
On 31 July 2025, Strefezza joined Olympiacos.

==== Loan to Parma ====
On 2 February 2026, Strefezza returned to Italy and joined Parma on loan until the end of the season.

=== Palermo ===
On 6 August 2026, Strefezza joined Palermo on a permanent basis, transferring from Olympiacos. The Sicilian club closed the deal for a €2.8 million transfer fee, signing the Brazilian player through a long term contract until 2030.

== Career statistics ==
=== Club ===
As of matches played 10 May 2026

Appearances and goals by club, season and competition
Club	Season	League			National cup (Note: Includes Coppa Italia)		Europe		Other		Total	
Club	Season	Division	Apps	Goals	Apps	Goals	Apps	Goals	Apps	Goals	Apps	Goals
SPAL	2016–17	Serie B	1	0	0	0	—		—		1	0
SPAL	2019–20	Serie A	32	1	1	0	—		—		33	1
SPAL	2020–21	Serie B	29	4	2	0	—		—		31	4
SPAL	Total		62	5	3	0	—		—		65	5
Juve Stabia (loan)	2017–18	Serie C	32	3	2	1	—		4 (Note: One appearance in Coppa Italia Serie C, three appearances in Serie C promotion play-offs)	0	38	4
Cremonese (loan)	2018–19	Serie B	23	1	1	0	—		—		24	1
Lecce	2021–22	Serie B	35	14	1	0	—		—		36	14
Lecce	2022–23	Serie A	35	8	1	1	—		—		36	9
Lecce	2023–24	Serie A	19	1	2	1	—		—		21	2
Lecce	Total		89	23	4	2	—		—		93	25
Como (loan)	2023–24	Serie B	15	3	0	0	—		—		15	3
Como	2024–25	Serie A	37	6	1	0	—		—		38	6
Como	Total		52	9	1	0	—		—		53	9
Olympiacos	2025–26	Super League Greece	11	1	3	0	5	0	—		20	1
Parma	2026	Serie A	13	2	0	0	—		—		13	2
Parma	Total		24	3	3	0	5	0	—		33	3
Palermo	2026–2027	Serie B	—	—	—	—	—		—		—	—
Career total			282	43	14	3	6	0	4	0	306	46

== Honours ==
SPAL

- Serie B: 2016–17

Lecce

- Serie B: 2021–22

Olympiacos

- Greek Super Cup: 2025
