= Stavros Pnevmonidis =

Greek footballer (born 2006)

Personal information
- Full name: Stavros Pnevmonidis
- Date of birth: 7 August 2006 (age 20)
- Place of birth: Kastoria, Greece
- Position: Winger

Team information
- Current team: Atromitos (on loan from Olympiacos)
- Number: 10

Youth career
- 2012–2018: Doxa Korisou
- 2018–2025: Olympiacos

Senior career*
Years	Team	Apps	(Gls)
2025–	Olympiacos	2	(0)
2025–2026	Olympiacos B	12	(3)
2026–	→ Atromitos (loan)	19	(2)

International career^{‡}
2024–	Greece U19	4	(0)
2025–	Greece U21	6	(4)
- * Club domestic league appearances and goals as of 19 September 2026 ‡ National team caps and goals as of 26 September 2026

Stavros Pnevmonidis (born 7 August 2006) is a Greek professional footballer who plays as a winger for Super League club Atromitos, on loan from Olympiacos.

He was part of the team that won the 2024 UEFA Youth League and has represented Greece U19.

== Club career ==
Pnevmomidis began his career at Olympiacos U19, emerging as a key player in their historic UEFA Youth League 2023–24 victory. He featured in 7 matches, accumulating 550 minutes of playing time and scoring 5 goals.

On 12 February 2025, he scored a decisive header in Olympiacos's 1–0 win over Girona in the Round of 16 of the UEFA Youth League.

He made the jump to Olympiacos's first team on 1 July 2025, signing a professional contract.

== International career ==
Since 2024, Pnevmomidis has been capped by Greece U19, appearing in at least 4 matches during qualification and friendly matches.

== Career statistics ==
As of match played 5 July 2026

Appearances and goals by club, season and competition
Club	Season	League			Greek Cup		Europe		Total	
Club	Season	Division	Apps	Goals	Apps	Goals	Apps	Goals	Apps	Goals
Olympiacos	2025–26	Super League Greece	2	0	2	0	1 (Note: Appearance in UEFA Champions League)	0	5	0
Atromitos (loan)	2025–26	Super League Greece	14	2	0	0	–	–	14	2
Career total			16	0	2	0	1	0	19	2

== Honours ==
Olympiacos Youth

- UEFA Youth League: 2023–24

Olympiacos

- Greek Super Cup: 2025
