= Giulian Biancone =

French footballer (born 2000)

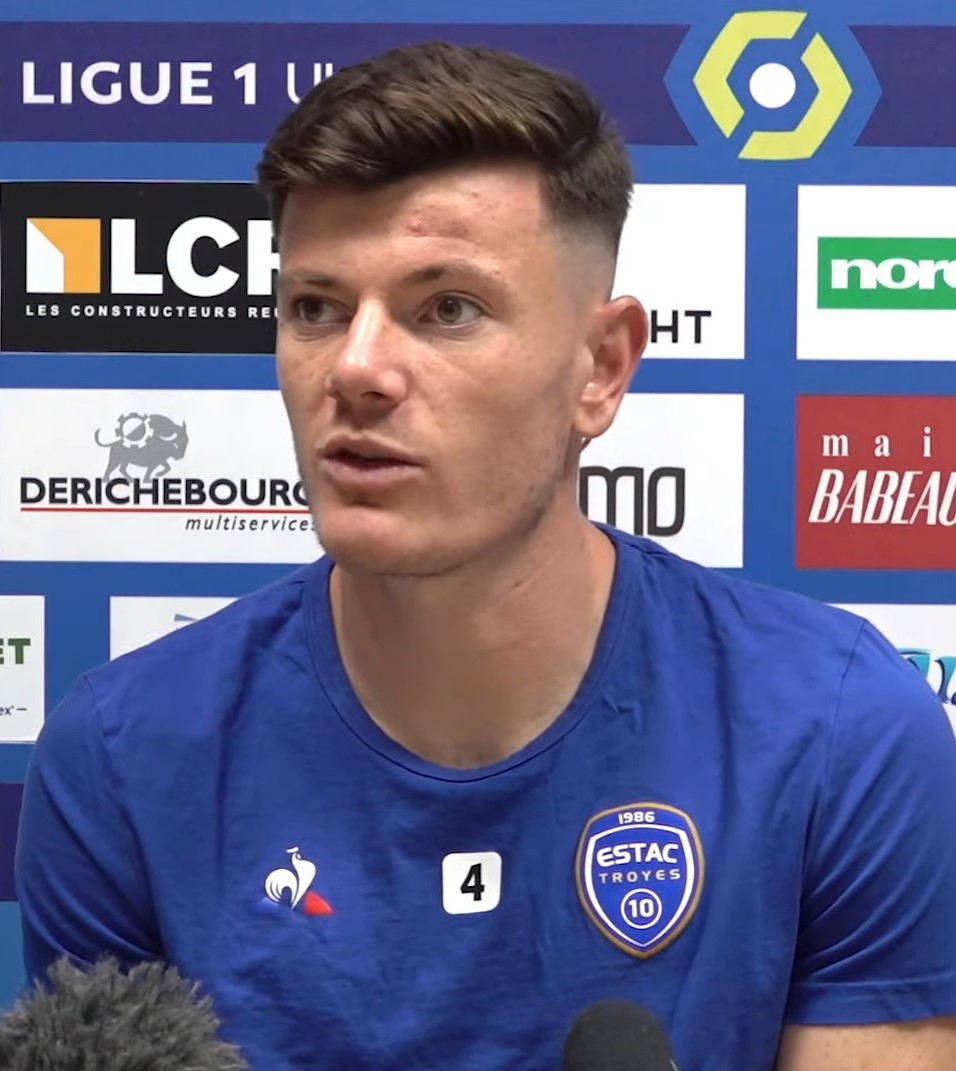
- Biancone with Troyes in 2021

Personal information
- Full name: Giulian Alexis André Biancone
- Date of birth: 31 March 2000 (age 26)
- Place of birth: Fréjus, France
- Height: 1.87 m (6 ft 2 in)
- Position: Centre-back

Team information
- Current team: RSC Anderlecht
- Number: 4

Youth career
- 2006–2011: AS Maximoise
- 2011–2015: Fréjus
- 2015–2018: Monaco

Senior career*
Years	Team	Apps	(Gls)
2018–2021	Monaco	3	(0)
2019	Monaco B	13	(1)
2019–2020	→ Cercle Brugge (loan)	25	(1)
2020–2021	→ Cercle Brugge (loan)	18	(1)
2021–2022	Troyes	33	(1)
2022	Troyes B	1	(0)
2022–2023	Nottingham Forest	2	(0)
2023–2026	Olympiacos	44	(1)
2023	Olympiacos B	3	(0)
2026–	Anderlecht	7	(0)

International career
2018–2019	France U19	7	(0)
- * Club domestic league appearances and goals as of 25 October 2026

Giulian Alexis André Biancone (born 31 March 2000) is a French professional footballer who plays as a centre-back for Belgian Pro League club Anderlecht.

== Early life ==
Giulian Alexis André Biancone was born on 31 March 2000 in Fréjus, Var.

== Club career ==
Biancone made his professional debut with Monaco in a 2–0 UEFA Champions League loss to Atlético Madrid on 28 November 2018.

In July 2019, Biancone joined Monaco's satellite club Cercle Brugge on a season-long loan.

On 12 August 2021, Ligue 1 club Troyes signed Biancone on a five-year contract.

On 3 July 2022, Biancone signed a three-year contract with Premier League club Nottingham Forest for an undisclosed fee. On 23 August, he made his debut for the club in a 3–0 win over Grimsby Town in the EFL Cup. On 31 August, Biancone made his Premier League debut as a substitute for Cheikhou Kouyaté in a 6–0 away defeat to champions Manchester City.

On 18 September 2023, Biancone signed with Greek Super League side Olympiacos for an undisclosed transfer fee.

On 23 June 2026, Biancone was announced at RSC Anderlecht on a three year contract, with the option of an extra season.

== International career ==
Biancone is a youth international for France, having represented the France U19s.

== Career statistics ==
As of match played 25 October 2026

Appearances and goals by club, season and competition
Club	Season	League			National cup (Note: Includes Coupe de France, Belgian Cup, Greek Football Cup)		League cup (Note: Includes Coupe de la Ligue, EFL Cup)		Continental		Other		Total	
Club	Season	Division	Apps	Goals	Apps	Goals	Apps	Goals	Apps	Goals	Apps	Goals	Apps	Goals
Monaco B	2018–19	Championnat National 1	13	1	—		—		—		—		13	1
Monaco	2018–19	Ligue 1	1	0	1	0	1	1	2 (Note: Appearances in UEFA Champions League)	0	—		5	1
Monaco	2019–20	Ligue 1	0	0	0	0	0	0	0	0	—		0	0
Monaco	2020–21	Ligue 1	2	0	0	0	—		—		—		2	0
Monaco	Total		3	0	1	0	1	1	2	0	—		7	1
Cercle Brugge (loan)	2019–20	Belgian Pro League	25	1	1	0	—		—		—		26	1
Cercle Brugge (loan)	2020–21	Belgian Pro League	18	1	2	0	—		—		—		20	1
Cercle Brugge (loan)	Total		43	2	3	0	—		—		—		46	2
Troyes B	2021–22	Championnat National 2	1	0	—		—		—		—		1	0
Troyes	2021–22	Ligue 1	33	1	0	0	—		—		—		33	1
Nottingham Forest	2022–23	Premier League	2	0	0	0	1	0	—		—		3	0
Olympiacos	2023–24	Super League Greece	11	0	1	0	—		0	0	—		12	0
Olympiacos	2024–25	Super League Greece	17	1	4	0	—		4 (Note: Appearances in UEFA Europa League)	1	—		25	2
Olympiacos	2025–26	Super League Greece	16	0	3	2	—		7	0	1 (Note: Appearance in Greek Super Cup)	0	27	2
Olympiacos	Total		44	1	8	2	—		11	1	1	0	64	4
Olympiacos B	2023–24	Super League Greece 2	3	0	—		—		—		—		3	0
RSC Anderlecht	2026–27	Belgian Pro League	7	0	0	0	—		7	1	—		14	1
Career total			149	5	12	2	2	1	20	2	1	0	184	10

== Honours ==
Olympiacos

- Super League Greece: 2024–25
- Greek Football Cup: 2024–25
- Greek Super Cup: 2025
