= Gustavo Mancha =

Brazilian footballer (born 2004)

Personal information
- Full name: Gustavo Teixeira Lopes da Conceição
- Date of birth: 25 July 2004 (age 22)
- Place of birth: Oliveira dos Brejinhos, Brazil
- Height: 1.88 m (6 ft 2 in)
- Position: Centre-back

Team information
- Current team: Rio Ave (on loan from Olympiacos)
- Number: 39

Youth career
- 2019–2023: Palmeiras
- 2024–2025: Fortaleza

Senior career*
Years	Team	Apps	(Gls)
2025	Fortaleza	14	(0)
2025–	Olympiacos	4	(0)
2026–	→ Rio Ave (loan)	21	(0)
- * Club domestic league appearances and goals as of 1 November 2026

Gustavo Teixeira Lopes da Conceição (born 25 July 2004), commonly known as Gustavo Mancha, is a Brazilian professional footballer who plays as a centre-back for Primeira Liga club Rio Ave, on loan from Olympiacos.

== Career ==
=== Fortaleza ===
Born in Oliveira dos Brejinhos, Bahia, Gustavo Mancha joined Palmeiras' youth sides for the under-15 squad. On 11 March 2024, he left the club after terminating his link, and was announced at Fortaleza on 4 April, initially for the under-20 team.

After playing in the 2025 Copa São Paulo de Futebol Júnior, Gustavo Mancha was promoted to the first team, and made his senior debut on 25 January of that year by starting in a 3–1 Campeonato Cearense away win over Horizonte. Four days later, he renewed his contract until December 2026.

=== Olympiacos ===
On 1 September 2025, Gustavo Mancha moved abroad and joined Super League Greece side Olympiacos, for a fee of € 4.5 million for 80% of his economic rights.

==== Rio Ave (loan) ====
On 2 February 2026, Mancha was sent on loan to Portuguese Primeira Liga club Rio Ave until the end of the season.

== Career statistics ==
As of 15 September 2025

Appearances and goals by club, season and competition
Club	Season	League			State league		Cup		Continental		Other		Total	
Club	Season	Division	Apps	Goals	Apps	Goals	Apps	Goals	Apps	Goals	Apps	Goals	Apps	Goals
Fortaleza	2025	Série A	13	0	1	0	2	0	4 (Note: Appearance(s) in Copa Libertadores)	0	3 (Note: Appearance(s) in Copa do Nordeste)	0	23	0
Olympiacos	2025–26	Super League Greece	0	0	—		1	0	0	0	—		1	0
Career total			13	0	1	0	3	0	4	0	3	0	24	0

== Honours ==
Olympiacos

- Greek Super Cup: 2025
