= Yusuf Yazıcı =

Turkish footballer (born 1997)

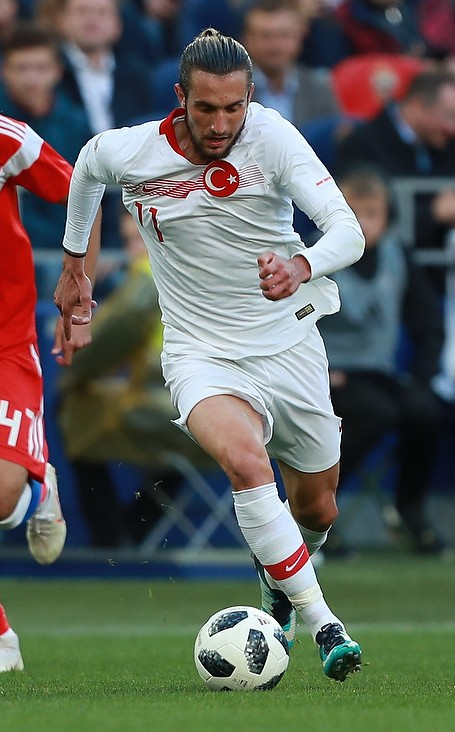
- Yazıcı playing for Turkey in 2018

Personal information
- Full name: Yusuf Yazıcı
- Date of birth: 29 January 1997 (age 29)
- Place of birth: Trabzon, Turkey
- Height: 1.83 m (6 ft 0 in)
- Positions: Attacking midfielder; second striker

Team information
- Current team: Olympiacos
- Number: 97

Youth career
- 2008–2016: Trabzonspor

Senior career*
| Years | Team | Apps | (Gls) |
| 2015–2019 | Trabzonspor | 87 | (20) |
| 2019–2024 | Lille | 96 | (15) |
| 2022 | → CSKA Moscow (loan) | 10 | (8) |
| 2022–2023 | → Trabzonspor (loan) | 13 | (3) |
| 2024– | Olympiacos | 22 | (2) |

International career^{‡}
| 2016 | Turkey U19 | 3 | (1) |
| 2016–2017 | Turkey U21 | 3 | (0) |
| 2017– | Turkey | 45 | (3) |
- * Club domestic league appearances and goals as of 23:00, 5 April 2026 (UTC) ‡ National team caps and goals as of 23:25, 22 June 2024 (UTC)

Yusuf Yazıcı (born 29 January 1997) is a Turkish professional footballer who plays as an attacking midfielder for Super League Greece club Olympiacos and the Turkey national team.

An academy graduate of Trabzonspor, Yazıcı made his senior debut in December 2015, aged 18, and made over eighty league appearances for the club. In 2019, he joined Lille for €17.5 million, including €1 million of performance criteria, the highest transfer revenue of Trabzonspor's history. He made his senior international debut for Turkey in June 2017, and represented the side at UEFA Euro 2020. In 2022, he then returned to his hometown club on loan.

== Club career ==
=== Trabzonspor ===
Yazıcı was born in the Turkish town of Trabzon. During his schooling at Trabzon Erdogdu Anatolian High School, he was part of the football team which was crowned World High School Football Champions. He then progressed through the academy of local side Trabzonspor and signed his first professional contract with the club on 21 December 2015. He made his competitive debut the following day, starting in a 2–1 Turkish Cup win over Gaziantepspor. Yazıcı made his Süper Lig debut in the new year on 2 February 2016, coming on as a second-half substitute for Musa Nizam in a 2–1 loss to Akhisar Belediyespor. He scored his first goals for the club on 8 May, netting twice and assisting another two in a 6–0 win over Rizespor. In dong so, he became the youngest player to score during the 2015–16 Süper Lig season at the age of 19. He ultimately made nine appearances across all competitions for the season, scoring twice as Trabzonspor ended the campaign in twelfth position.

Midway through the following season, on 22 December, he scored his first Cup goals for the club, netting a brace in a 5–0 win over Kızılcabölükspor. Following the exclusion of regular midfielder Mehmet Ekici, Yazıcı enjoyed an extended run in the first team the following year and in March was rewarded with a new five-year contract worth a guaranteed TL250,000 a year. He ended the month by scoring in a 2–0 win over Galatasaray, a match in which scouts from Premier League side Manchester United and the Eredivisie's PSV Eindhoven were present to watch his performance. Yazıcı ultimately ended the season with a return of six goals in 22 appearances across all competitions.

On 22 October 2017, Yazıcı received his first ever red card when he was sent off in stoppage time in a 1–0 loss to Yeni Malatyaspor. Later that month, he scored his first goal for the campaign, netting the winner in a 2–1 victory over Galatasaray. In January the following year he was named by UEFA as one of the 50 young players to watch in 2018 and went on to end the season having scored 10 goals and recorded 5 assists in 33 league appearances. The following season, he contributed four goals and three assists in 34 appearances across all competitions.

On 6 June 2019, Yazıcı was linked with Lille OSC according to press declaration by Ahmet Ağaoğlu, club president. Although Ağagolu's statement to avoid potential transfer of Yazıcı, on 6 July 2019, Gérard Lopez, president of Lille, stated that there is a mutual interest between the club and Yazıcı. On 14 July 2019, Yazıcı reportedly submitted his request to Trabzonspor management in order to proceed negotiations with Lille. On 17 July 2019, Ağaoğlu stated that he is not distant to a potential transfer of Yazıcı to Lille, however it is not in their agenda due to the fact that amount of offer is not satisfying at such stage. On 4 August 2019, Yazıcı announced on his Instagram account that he decided to leave Trabzonspor, in order to "represent Trabzonspor abroad successfully". On 4 August 2019, Trabzonspor reportedly agreed with Lille for transfer of Yazıcı, in scope of €17.5 million and 50% transfer fee right of Portuguese defender Edgar Ié. Yazıcı left the club on 5 August 2019, taking pertinent flight from Trabzon Airport to France.

=== Lille ===
On 6 August 2019, Yazıcı joined Lille OSC on a five-year deal. On 6 August 2019, Trabzonspor announced the details of the transfer, confirming a €17.5 million, including €1 million of performance criteria, making it the highest transfer revenue of Trabzonspor's history. He chose number 12 for his jersey. Substituted in on 68th minute, Yazıcı made his Ligue 1 debut on week 1 encounter of 2019–20 season against Nantes that ended 2–1 for Lille at Stade Pierre-Mauroy, on 11 August 2019.

On 22 October 2020, he scored a hat-trick in a 4–1 away win against Sparta Prague in the 2020–21 UEFA Europa League. On 5 November 2020, he scored another Europa League hat-trick, this time in a 3–0 away win against Milan at the San Siro. Yazici's hat-trick was the first Milan had conceded at home in any competition since Barcelona's Rivaldo in 2000.

==== Loan to CSKA Moscow ====
On 19 January 2022, CSKA Moscow announced the loan of Yazıcı from Lille until the end of the season, with an option to buy the player in the summer. On 26 February 2022, he scored the opening goal from a direct free kick in his first Russian Premier League game for CSKA, a Main Moscow derby game against FC Spartak Moscow, the game ended with a 2–0 victory for CSKA. He followed that up with two assists in CSKA's next game, a Russian Cup 2–1 victory over PFC Sochi. In CSKA's next league game he scored the only goal of the game deep in added time to secure a victory over FC Nizhny Novgorod. He scored again in his third game on 12 March 2022 against FC Lokomotiv Moscow to extend CSKA's winning streak to 6 games. In the next game against FC Rubin Kazan on 20 March 2022, Yazıcı scored a hat-trick in a 6–1 victory. He became the first ever foreign player to score in each of their first 4 games in the RPL. On 25 March 2022, he was named Russian Premier League's player of the month.

On 3 April 2022, Yazıcı scored in his fifth straight game, a late equalizer in a 2–2 game against FC Ural Yekaterinburg, setting a new league record for most consecutive scoring games to start the league career for all players, not just foreign ones. He extended his streak to 6 in the next game on 9 April that CSKA lost to FC Khimki. The streak ended in the next game against FC Ufa on 16 April. On 23 June 2022, CSKA announced that the club was not able to reach agreement on a permanent transfer of Yazıcı and he returned to Lille.

=== Olympiacos ===
On 28 September 2024 Yazici signed a 3-year contract with the Greek giants and Conference League winners Olympiacos. On his debut performance for the team, he was badly injured in his left knee, suffering from a torn anterior cruciate ligament.

== International career ==
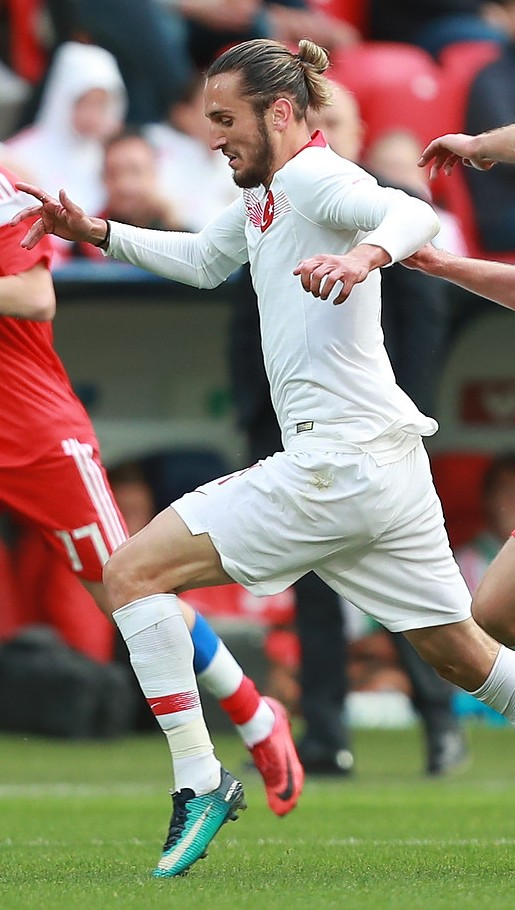
Yazıcı competing for Turkey against Russia in a friendly in 2018.

=== Youth ===
Yazıcı made his debut for the Turkey national under-19 football team on 25 February 2016 and scored the opening goal in a 3–2 loss to the Czech Republic. He later also represented the nation at U-21 level.

=== Senior ===
Yazıcı made his debut for the senior Turkey national football team on 11 June 2017 in a 4–1 2018 FIFA World Cup qualification win over Kosovo, and registered the assist for Turkey's fourth goal.

== Career statistics ==
=== Club ===
As of match played 3 January 2026

Appearances and goals by club, season and competition
| Club | Season | League | | | National cup (Note: Includes Turkish Cup, Coupe de France, Russian Cup, Greek Football Cup) | | Continental | | Other | | Total | |
| Club | Season | Division | Apps | Goals | Apps | Goals | Apps | Goals | Apps | Goals | Apps | Goals |
|---|---|---|---|---|---|---|---|---|---|---|---|---|
| Trabzonspor | 2015–16 | Süper Lig | 6 | 2 | 3 | 0 | — | | — | | 9 | 2 |
| Trabzonspor | 2016–17 | Süper Lig | 18 | 4 | 4 | 2 | — | | — | | 22 | 6 |
| Trabzonspor | 2017–18 | Süper Lig | 33 | 10 | 2 | 0 | — | | — | | 35 | 10 |
| Trabzonspor | 2018–19 | Süper Lig | 30 | 4 | 4 | 0 | — | | — | | 34 | 4 |
| Trabzonspor | Total | | 87 | 20 | 13 | 2 | 0 | 0 | 0 | 0 | 100 | 22 |
| Lille | 2019–20 | Ligue 1 | 18 | 1 | 1 | 0 | 6 (Note: Appearances in UEFA Champions League) | 0 | 0 | 0 | 25 | 1 |
| Lille | 2020–21 | Ligue 1 | 32 | 7 | 2 | 0 | 8 (Note: Appearances in UEFA Europa League) | 7 | — | | 42 | 14 |
| Lille | 2021–22 | Ligue 1 | 15 | 1 | 2 | 0 | 4 | 0 | 1 (Note: Appearance in Trophée des Champions) | 0 | 22 | 1 |
| Lille | 2022–23 | Ligue 1 | 4 | 1 | 0 | 0 | — | | — | | 4 | 1 |
| Lille | 2023–24 | Ligue 1 | 27 | 5 | 3 | 2 | 11 (Note: Appearances in UEFA Europa Conference League) | 5 | — | | 41 | 12 |
| Lille | Total | | 96 | 15 | 8 | 2 | 29 | 12 | 1 | 0 | 134 | 29 |
| CSKA Moscow (loan) | 2021–22 | Russian Premier League | 10 | 8 | 2 | 0 | — | | — | | 12 | 8 |
| Trabzonspor (loan) | 2022–23 | Süper Lig | 13 | 3 | 1 | 2 | 7 (Note: Four appearances in UEFA Europa League, three appearances in UEFA Europa Conference League) | 0 | — | | 21 | 5 |
| Olympiacos | 2024–25 | Super League Greece | 1 | 0 | 0 | 0 | 0 | 0 | — | | 1 | 0 |
| Olympiacos | 2025–26 | Super League Greece | 11 | 1 | 4 | 4 | 0 | 0 | 1 (Note: Appearance in Greek Super Cup) | 1 | 17 | 6 |
| Olympiacos | Total | | 12 | 1 | 4 | 4 | 0 | 0 | 1 | 1 | 18 | 6 |
| Career total | | | 217 | 47 | 28 | 8 | 34 | 12 | 2 | 1 | 282 | 67 |

=== International ===
As of match played 22 June 2024

Appearances and goals by national team and year
| National team | Year | Apps | Goals |
|---|---|---|---|
| Turkey | 2017 | 4 | 0 |
| Turkey | 2018 | 6 | 0 |
| Turkey | 2019 | 9 | 1 |
| Turkey | 2020 | 8 | 0 |
| Turkey | 2021 | 11 | 1 |
| Turkey | 2022 | 1 | 0 |
| Turkey | 2023 | 2 | 1 |
| Turkey | 2024 | 4 | 0 |
| Total | | 45 | 3 |

Scores and results list Turkey's goal tally first.

List of international goals scored by Yusuf Yazıcı
| No. | Date | Venue | Opponent | Score | Result | Competition |
|---|---|---|---|---|---|---|
| 1 | 10 September 2019 | Zimbru Stadium, Chișinău, Moldova | Moldova | 4–0 | 4–0 | UEFA Euro 2020 qualification |
| 2 | 1 September 2021 | Vodafone Park, Istanbul, Turkey | Montenegro | 2–0 | 2–2 | 2022 FIFA World Cup qualification |
| 3 | 21 November 2023 | Cardiff City Stadium, Cardiff, Wales | Wales | 1–1 | 1–1 | 2024 UEFA Euro qualification |

== Honours ==
Lille

- Ligue 1: 2020–21
- Trophée des Champions: 2021

Olympiacos

- Super League Greece: 2024–25
- Greek Football Cup: 2024–25
- Greek Super Cup: 2025

Individual

- UNFP Player of the Month: December 2020
- UEFA Europa League top scorer: 2020–21 (joint – 7 goals)
