= Argyris Liatsikouras =

Greek professional footballer

Personal information
- Full name: Argyrios Liatsikouras
- Date of birth: 12 October 2006 (age 20)
- Place of birth: Greece
- Height: 1.85 m (6 ft 1 in)
- Position: Defensive midfielder

Team information
- Current team: Kalamata (on loan from Olympiacos B)
- Number: 8

Youth career
- 2020–2025: Olympiacos

Senior career*
Years	Team	Apps	(Gls)
2025–	Olympiacos B	22	(2)
2026–	→ Kalamata (loan)	4	(0)

International career^{‡}
2024	Greece U19	11	(1)
- * Club domestic league appearances and goals as of 20 September 2026 ‡ National team caps and goals as of 1 July 2025

Argyris Liatsikouras (born 12 October 2006) is a Greek professional footballer who plays as a defensive midfielder for Super League club Kalamata, on loan from Olympiacos B, and the Greece U19 team.

== Club career ==
Liatsikouras is a product of the Olympiacos Academy. He played a key role in Olympiacos U19's successful UEFA Youth League 2023–24 campaign, appearing in six matches and helping the team reach the Round of 16.

He signed his first professional contract with Olympiacos on 1 July 2025.

== International career ==
Liatsikouras has been capped by Greece U19 since 2024, making appearances in qualification and friendly matches.

== Career statistics ==
As of 1 July 2025.

=== Club ===
Season	Club	League	Apps	Goals
2023–24	Olympiacos U19	UEFA Youth League	6	0
2025–	Olympiacos F.C.	Super League Greece	0	0

=== International ===
National team	Year	Apps	Goals
Greece U19	2024–	3	0

== Honours ==
Olympiacos Youth

- UEFA Youth League: 2023–24

Olympiacos

- Greek Super Cup: 2025
