= Lorenzo Scipioni =

Argentinian footballer (born 2004)

Personal information
- Full name: Lorenzo Scipioni
- Date of birth: 24 November 2004 (age 21)
- Place of birth: Martínez, Argentina
- Height: 1.81 m (5 ft 11 in)
- Position: Midfielder

Team information
- Current team: Olympiacos
- Number: 16

Senior career*
Years	Team	Apps	(Gls)
2022–2025	Tigre	30	(1)
2025–	Olympiacos	21	(1)
- * Club domestic league appearances and goals as of 22 November 2026

Lorenzo Scipioni (born 24 November 2004) is an Argentine professional footballer who plays as a midfielder for Super League Greece club Olympiacos.

== Club career ==
Scipioni began his professional career in Argentina at Vélez Sarsfield, where he was developed through their youth academy. In 2022, he transferred to Tigre, where he played for three seasons, making a total of 31 appearances and scoring 2 goals. During the 2024–25 season with Tigre, he played in 18 matches, scoring 2 goals and providing 1 assist.

On July 9, 2025, Olympiacos announced his signing from Tigre for a fee of €3.65 million for 80% of his rights, with Tigre retaining 20% and a sell-on clause. Scipioni signed a 4+1 year contract with the Greek club.

== Honours ==
Olympiacos

- Greek Super Cup: 2025
