= Alexis Kalogeropoulos =

Greek footballer (born 2004)

Personal information
- Full name: Alexios Kalogeropoulos
- Date of birth: 26 July 2004 (age 22)
- Place of birth: Andravida, Elis, Greece
- Height: 1.87 m (6 ft 2 in)
- Position: Centre-back

Team information
- Current team: 1. FC Nürnberg
- Number: 4

Youth career
- 2008–2018: Dafni Andravida
- 2018–2020: Asteras Tripolis
- 2020–2021: Olympiacos

Senior career*
Years	Team	Apps	(Gls)
2021–2026	Olympiacos	10	(0)
2021–2023	Olympiacos B	26	(0)
2023–2025	→ Volos (loan)	58	(1)
2026–	1. FC Nürnberg	6	(0)

International career^{‡}
2021–2023	Greece U19	12	(1)
2024–	Greece U21	14	(1)
- * Club domestic league appearances and goals as of 19 September 2026 ‡ National team caps and goals as of 26 September 2026

Alexis Kalogeropoulos (Greek: Αλέξης Καλογερόπουλος; born 26 July 2004) is a Greek professional footballer who plays as a centre-back for 2. Bundesliga club 1. FC Nürnberg.

== Club career ==
On 12 June 2026, Kalogeropoulos signed with 1. FC Nürnberg in German 2. Bundesliga.

== Career statistics ==
=== Club ===
As of match played 3 January 2025

Club	Season	League			Greek Cup		Continental		Other		Total	
Club	Season	Division	Apps	Goals	Apps	Goals	Apps	Goals	Apps	Goals	Apps	Goals
Olympiacos	2020–21	Super League Greece	3	0	0	0	0	0	—		3	0
Olympiacos	2022–23	Super League Greece	0	0	0	0	1 (Note: Appearance in UEFA Europa League)	0	—		1	0
Olympiacos	2025–26	Super League Greece	3	0	4	1	0	0	1 (Note: Appearance in Greek Super Cup)	1	8	2
Olympiacos	Total		6	0	4	1	1	0	1	1	12	2
Olympiacos B	2021–22	Super League Greece 2	13	0	—		—		—		13	0
Olympiacos B	2022–23	Super League Greece 2	13	0	—		—		—		13	0
Olympiacos B	Total		26	0	—		—		—		26	0
Volos (loan)	2023–24	Super League Greece	25	0	3	0	—		—		28	0
Volos (loan)	2024–25	Super League Greece	33	1	2	1	—		—		35	2
Volos (loan)	Total		58	1	5	1	—		—		63	2
Career total			90	1	9	2	1	0	1	1	101	4

== Honours ==
Olympiacos

- Super League Greece: 2020–21
- Greek Super Cup: 2025

Individual

- Volos Player of the Season: 2024–25
