= Panagiotis Retsos =

Footballer (born 1998)

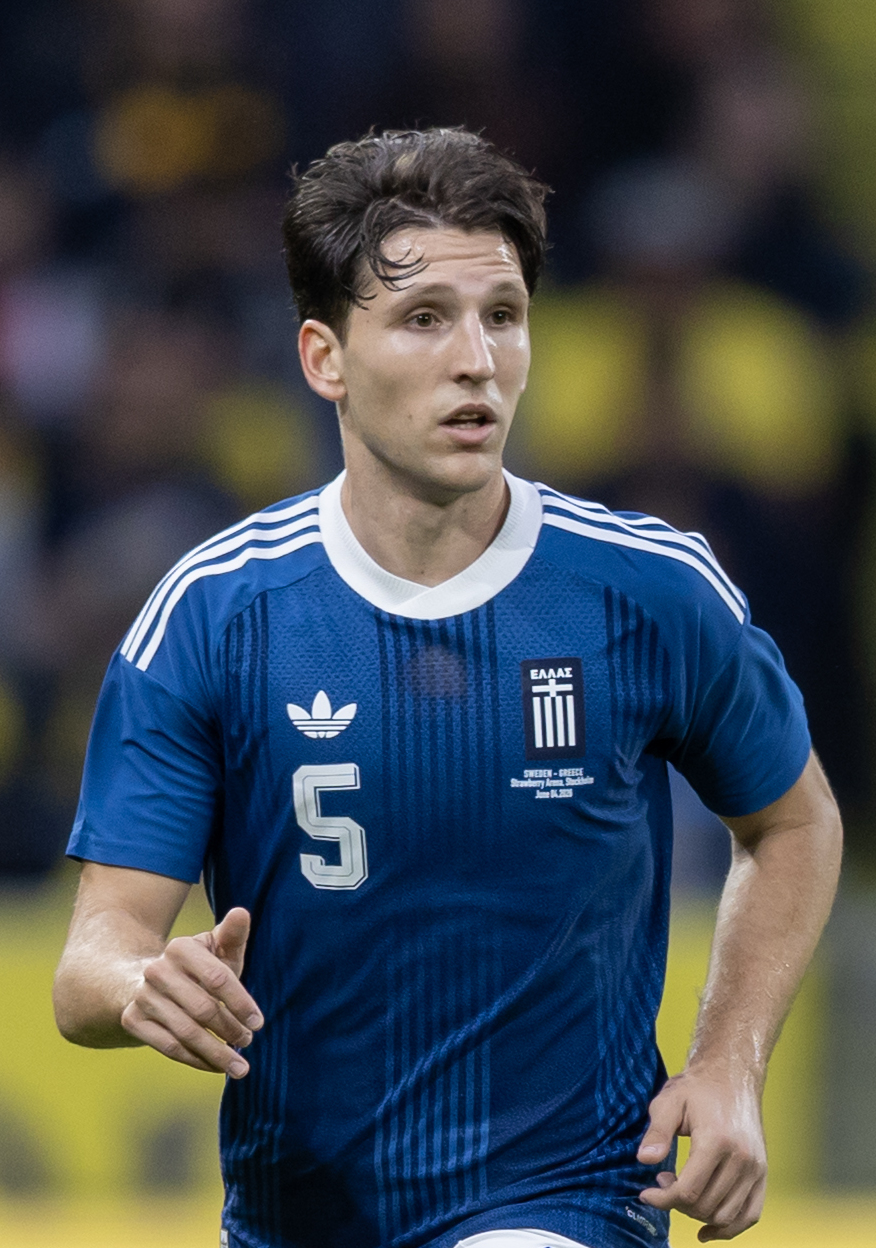
- Retsos playing for Greece in 2026

Personal information
- Full name: Panagiotis Retsos
- Date of birth: 9 August 1998 (age 28)
- Place of birth: Johannesburg, South Africa
- Height: 1.86 m (6 ft 1 in)
- Position: Centre-back

Team information
- Current team: Olympiacos
- Number: 45

Youth career
- 2008–2016: Olympiacos

Senior career*
Years	Team	Apps	(Gls)
2016–2017	Olympiacos	20	(0)
2017–2022	Bayer Leverkusen	31	(1)
2020	→ Sheffield United (loan)	0	(0)
2020–2021	→ Saint-Étienne (loan)	4	(0)
2022–2023	Hellas Verona	7	(0)
2022–2023	→ Olympiacos (loan)	7	(0)
2023–	Olympiacos	79	(4)

International career^{‡}
2014	Greece U16	1	(0)
2014–2015	Greece U17	10	(0)
2015	Greece U18	3	(1)
2016–2017	Greece U19	10	(0)
2019–2020	Greece U21	5	(0)
2017–	Greece	29	(0)
- * Club domestic league appearances and goals as of 22 November 2026 ‡ National team caps and goals as of 16 November 2026

Panagiotis Retsos (Greek: Παναγιώτης Ρέτσος, born 9 August 1998) is a professional footballer who plays as a centre-back and captain for Super League club Olympiacos. Born in South Africa, he plays for the Greece national team.

== Club career ==
=== Olympiacos ===
In the summer of 2016, at age 18, he was promoted from Olympiacos' youth team by first manager Víctor Sánchez, who was impressed by his stamina. On 25 August 2016, he made his debut with the club in a Europa League playoffs home match against Arouca.

On 8 February 2017, Retsos was appointed captain of the club in a Greek Cup goalless home draw against Atromitos. Retsos became the youngest captain of Olympiacos aged only 18, five months and 30 days.

=== Bayer Leverkusen ===
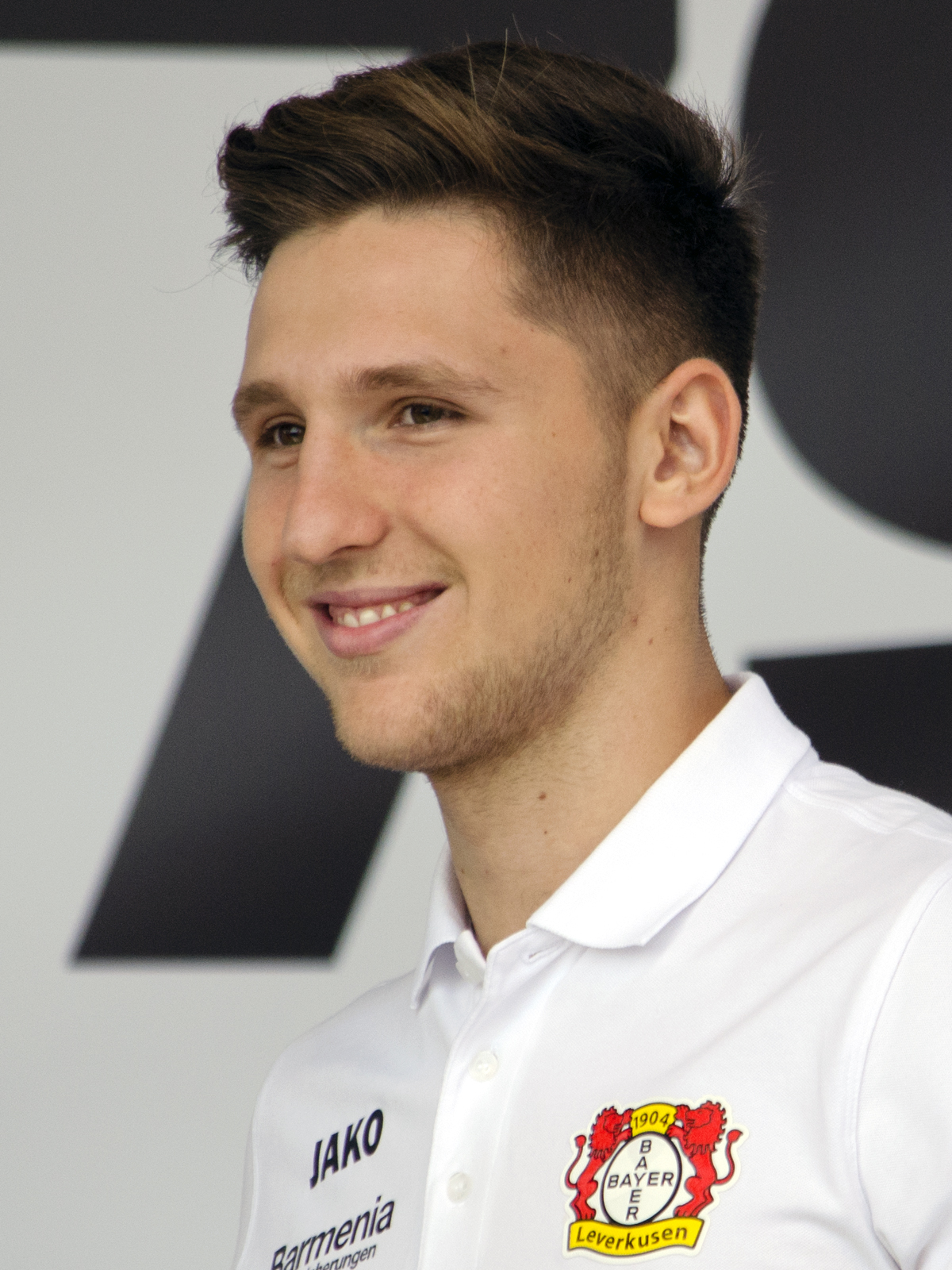
Retsos with Bayer Leverkusen in 2018

On 30 August 2017, Retsos was sold to Bayer Leverkusen for a fee of £15.75 million. The 19-year-old centre-back signed a five-year deal with Leverkusen. On 17 September 2017, he made his Bundesliga debut in a 4–0 home win against SC Freiburg as a starter. On the club's Twitter account, Retsos was voted the Man of the Match.

On 9 April 2018, Retsos scored his first goal in Bundesliga in a 4–1 away win against RB Leipzig. Retsos made a total of 20 appearances in his debut Bundesliga campaign.

On 2 August 2018, Retsos suffered a heavy blow to the quadriceps during pre-season training with Bayer Leverkusen and was diagnosed with tendonitis in the right thigh. The injury is expected to sideline the defender for at least six weeks.

On 29 November 2018, Retsos returned to action in a UEFA Europa League home game against Ludogorets, but suffered a new injury in his left thigh. On 29 October 2019, after almost a year out with injury, Retsos played in a DFB-Pokal game as a substitute in a 1–0 home win against Paderborn SC.

==== Loan to Sheffield United ====
On 1 February 2020, Retsos signed for Premier League club Sheffield United on loan from Bayer Leverkusen until the end of the 2019–20 season with an option to buy. The breakout of COVID-19 across the UK, however, which lead to the temporary suspension of football in England meant Retsos failed to make an appearance. Retsos declined an offer to extend his loan to comply with the extended Premier League season, returning to his parent club.

==== Loan to Saint-Étienne ====
On 4 October 2020, Retsos joined Saint-Étienne on loan with a purchase option of €6.5 million in the summer of 2021, becoming an obligation if he makes 20 appearances. On 25 October 2020, Retsos suffered a muscular injury at the beginning of the second half vs FC Metz, keeping him out for 2½ months. He returned on 6 January 2021 playing 90 minutes against PSG. However, three days later in the away match against Reims he went off injured at the end of the first half with another injury. Retsos did not appear again for the club.

=== Hellas Verona ===
On 25 January 2022, Retsos joined Hellas Verona on a free transfer signing an 18-month contract.

==== Loan to Olympiacos ====
On 31 August 2022, Retsos returned to Olympiacos on loan. After only a few months, in December 2022 Olympiacos activated the purchase option and acquired Panagiotis Retsos through a transfer with a contract until 2025. On 29 May 2024, he won the Conference League with Olympiacos. He played for the entire duration of the match. Before the start of the 2024–25 season, Olympiacos proceeded with an extension of Retsos’ contract until 2028, along with an increase in the player's earnings. He was also appointed captain of the team together with Giorgos Masouras.

In the 2025–26 season, Retsos continues to be a key member of Olympiacos’ defense, wearing the captain's armband in several matches and contributing significantly to the team's strong performance both in the league and in European competitions. In December 2025, he suffered a strain to the adductor muscle, which kept him out for the remainder of the year, with the team choosing to protect him to ensure full recovery.

== International career ==
Retsos made his debut for Greece on 31 August 2017, in a 0–0 home draw against Estonia in the 2018 FIFA World Cup qualification.

== Personal life ==
Retsos was born in Johannesburg, South Africa to Greek parents Christos and Eleni. He and his family returned to their native Greece a year after his birth. He has a younger cousin, Christos, who is also a footballer. His paternal family hails from Skortsinos.

== Career statistics ==
As of match played 20 December 2025

Appearances and goals by club, season and competition
Club	Season	League			National cup (Note: Includes Greek Football Cup, DFB-Pokal, FA Cup)		Europe		Total	
Club	Season	Division	Apps	Goals	Apps	Goals	Apps	Goals	Apps	Goals
Olympiacos	2016–17	Super League Greece	18	0	8	0	8 (Note: Appearances in UEFA Europa League)	0	34	0
Olympiacos	2017–18	Super League Greece	2	0	0	0	4 (Note: Appearances in UEFA Champions League)	0	6	0
Olympiacos	Total		20	0	8	0	12	0	40	0
Bayer Leverkusen	2017–18	Bundesliga	24	1	4	0	0	0	28	1
Bayer Leverkusen	2018–19	Bundesliga	0	0	0	0	1	0	1	0
Bayer Leverkusen	2019–20	Bundesliga	3	0	1	0	2	0	6	0
Bayer Leverkusen	2021–22	Bundesliga	4	0	2	0	3	0	9	0
Bayer Leverkusen	Total		31	1	7	0	6	0	44	1
Sheffield United (loan)	2019–20	Premier League	0	0	1	0	–		1	0
Saint-Étienne (loan)	2020–21	Ligue 1	4	0	0	0	–		4	0
Hellas Verona	2021–22	Serie A	5	0	0	0	–		5	0
Hellas Verona	2022–23	Serie A	2	0	0	0	–		2	0
Hellas Verona	Total		7	0	0	0	–		7	0
Olympiacos (loan)	2022–23	Super League Greece	7	0	3	0	4	0	14	0
Olympiacos	2023–24	Super League Greece	27	0	1	0	17 (Note: Ten appearances and one goal in UEFA Europa League, seven appearances in UEFA Conference League)	1	45	1
Olympiacos	2024–25	Super League Greece	17	1	5	0	9	0	31	1
Olympiacos	2025–26	Super League Greece	26	2	3	1	9	0	38	3
Olympiacos	2026–27	Super League Greece	1	0	0	0	2	0	3	0
Olympiacos	Total		71	3	9	1	37	1	117	5
Career total			140	4	28	1	59	1	228	6

== Honours ==
Olympiacos

- Super League Greece: 2016–17, 2024–25
- Greek Football Cup: 2024–25
- UEFA Conference League: 2023–24
- Greek Super Cup: 2025

Individual

- Super League Greece Team of the Season: 2016–17, 2024–25, 2025–26
- Super League Greece Young Player of the Season: 2016–17
