= Nikolaos Botis =

Greek footballer (born 2004)

Personal information
- Full name: Nikolaos Nestoras Botis
- Date of birth: 31 March 2004 (age 22)
- Place of birth: Larissa, Greece
- Height: 1.96 m (6 ft 5 in)
- Position: Goalkeeper

Team information
- Current team: Pogoń Szczecin
- Number: 31

Youth career
- –2020: PAOK
- 2020–2023: Inter Milan
- 2024–2025: Olympiacos

Senior career*
| Years | Team | Apps | (Gls) |
| 2022–2024 | Inter Milan | 0 | (0) |
| 2023–2024 | → Monopoli (loan) | 0 | (0) |
| 2024–2026 | Olympiacos B | 12 | (0) |
| 2024–2026 | Olympiacos | 0 | (0) |
| 2026– | Pogoń Szczecin | 1 | (0) |

International career^{‡}
| 2022 | Greece U18 | 2 | (0) |
| 2021–2023 | Greece U19 | 5 | (0) |
| 2024– | Greece U21 | 12 | (0) |
- * Club domestic league appearances and goals as of 19:13, 12 November 2026 (UTC) ‡ National team caps and goals as of 23:20, 17 November 2026 (UTC)

Nikolaos Nestoras Botis (Greek: Νικόλαος Νέστορας Μπότης; born 31 March 2004) is a Greek professional footballer who plays as a goalkeeper for Ekstraklasa club Pogoń Szczecin.

== Club career ==
Born in Larissa, Botis started his career with PAOK, before joining the academy of Italian club Inter Milan in the summer of 2020.

On 1 September 2023, Botis joined Serie C club Monopoli on a season-long loan.

== International career ==
In July 2023, Botis was named in the Greece under-19 squad for the 2023 UEFA European Under-19 Championship.

== Honours ==
Olympiacos

- Greek Super Cup: 2025
