= 2025 Greek Super Cup =

Olympiacos	OFI
3	0
- After extra time
- Date: 3 January 2026
- Venue: Pankritio Stadium, Heraklion
- Man of the Match: Alexis Kalogeropoulos (Olympiacos)
- Referee: Alexandros Tsakalidis (Chalkidiki)
- Attendance: 16,471
- Weather: Fair; 16 °C (61 °F); 59% humidity

The 2025 Greek Super Cup was the 10th edition of the Greek Super Cup, a football match between the winners of the previous Super League Greece and the holders or runners-up of the Greek Cup. The match was held on 3 January 2026 at Pankritio Stadium.The contesting teams were the 2024–25 Super League Greece champions and the 2024–25 Greek Cup winners, Olympiacos and the 2024–25 Greek Cup runners-up, OFI, after Olympiacos won the double the previous season. It was the first Super Cup that was held in 18 years, as in the interim, general interest in the competition had decreased, mainly due to the frequent conquest of the double by the same clubs. The match was originally scheduled to be played in 2025, but was postponed to 2026 due to the competitive commitments of both clubs. Olympiacos won the match 3–0 after extra time.

== Venue ==
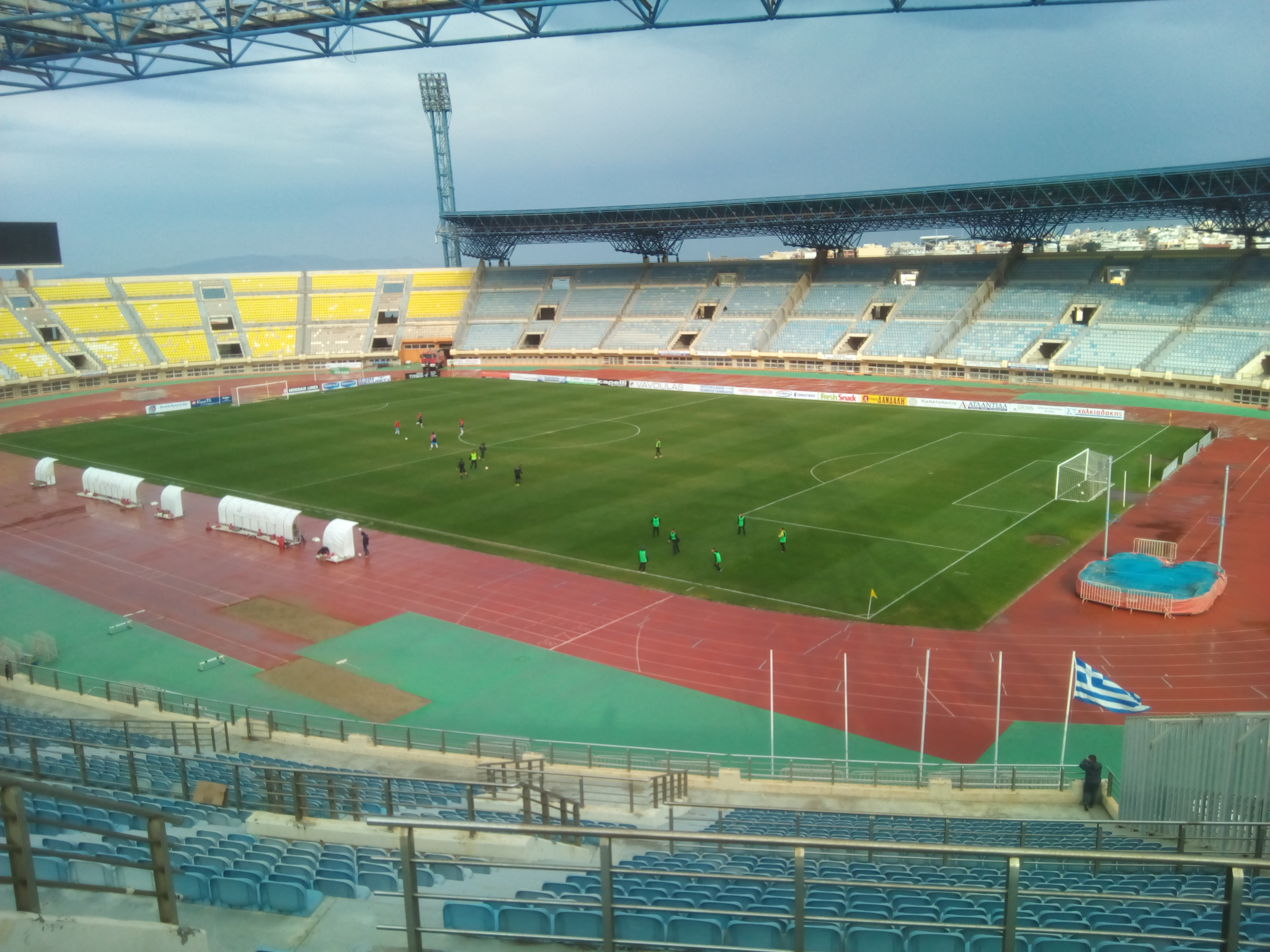
Pankritio Stadium

This was the first Greek Super Cup to be held at Pankritio Stadium.

The Pankritio Stadium was built in 2004. The stadium is used as a venue for OFI and was used for Ergotelis and Greece. Its current capacity is 26,240.

== Background ==
Olympiacos has participated in the Greek Super Cup four times, winning all of them. The last time that they had played in the Super Cup was in 2007, where they beat AEL 1–0.

OFI participated in the Greek Super Cup once in 1987, where they lost to Olympiacos 1–0.

The two teams met each other once in the Super Cup, in 1987.

== Match ==
=== Details ===
3 January 2026
20:00 EET

Olympiacos	3–0 (a.e.t.)	OFI
Taremi 95' (pen.); Kalogeropoulos 107'; Yazıcı 113'	Report

Pankritio Stadium, Heraklion
Attendance: 16,471
Referee: Alexandros Tsakalidis (Chalkidiki)

Olympiacos	OFI

GK	88	(Greece) Konstantinos Tzolakis
RB	23	(Brazil) Rodinei		(substituted off) 91'
CB	45	(Greece) Panagiotis Retsos (c)
CB	4	(France) Giulian Biancone		(substituted off) 88'
LB	3	(Argentina) Francisco Ortega
DM	96	(Greece) Christos Mouzakitis
DM	32	(Argentina) Santiago Hezze	(yellow card) 60'
RW	10	(Portugal) Gelson Martins	(yellow card) 90+11'	(substituted off) 110'
LW	56	(Portugal) Daniel Podence		(substituted off) 102'
AM	22	(Portugal) Chiquinho		(substituted off) 90+2'
CF	99	(Iran) Mehdi Taremi		(substituted off) 106'
Substitutes:
GK	31	(Greece) Nikolaos Botis
DF	6	(Greece) Alexis Kalogeropoulos		(substituted on) 88'
DF	20	(Portugal) Costinha		(substituted on) 91'
DF	39	(Brazil) Gustavo Mancha
MF	8	(Portugal) Diogo Nascimento		(substituted on) 106'
MF	14	(Spain) Dani García
MF	16	(Argentina) Lorenzo Scipioni
MF	67	(Greece) Argyris Liatsikouras
MF	80	(Greece) Stavros Pnevmonidis
MF	97	(Turkey) Yusuf Yazıcı		(substituted on) 110'
FW	11	(Ukraine) Roman Yaremchuk		(substituted on) 90+2'
FW	27	(Brazil) Gabriel Strefezza		(substituted on) 102'
Manager:
(Spain) José Luis Mendilibar

GK	31	(Greece) Nikos Christogeorgos
CB	5	(Greece) Konstantinos Kostoulas	(yellow card) 93'	(substituted off) 106'
CB	24	(Greece) Vasilios Lampropoulos (c)	(yellow card) 100'	(substituted off) 106'
CB	2	(Croatia) Krešimir Krizmanić
DM	21	(Greece) Giannis Apostolakis	(yellow card) 47'
DM	14	(Greece) Thanasis Androutsos	(yellow card) 42'
RM	17	(Spain) Borja González
LM	12	(Greece) Ilias Chatzitheodoridis		(substituted off) 68'
RW	27	(Georgia (country)) Levan Shengelia		(substituted off) 68'
LW	18	(Argentina) Thiago Nuss		(substituted off) 83'
CF	9	(Italy) Eddie Salcedo	(yellow card) 37'
Substitutes:
GK	1	(Albania) Klidman Lilo
GK	13	(Greece) Panagiotis Katsikas
DF	4	(Greece) Nikos Marinakis
DF	15	(Greece) Achilleas Poungouras		(substituted on) 106'
DF	22	(Greece) Giannis Christopoulos
DF	90	(Greece) Pavlos Kenourgiakis
MF	8	(Montenegro) Ilija Vukotić
MF	10	(Argentina) Juan Neira	(yellow card) 119'	(substituted on) 106'
MF	25	(Serbia) Filip Bainović		(substituted on) 68'
FW	11	(Greece) Taxiarchis Fountas		(substituted on) 68' (substituted off) 90+5'
FW	46	(Greece) Giannis Theodosoulakis		(substituted on) 83'
FW	99	(Belgium) Aaron Leya Iseka		(substituted on) 90+5'
Manager:
(Greece) Christos Kontis

Man of the Match:
Alexis Kalogeropoulos (Olympiacos)

Assistant referees:
Polychronis Kostaras (Aetoloacarnania)
Lazaros Dimitriadis (Macedonia)
Fourth official:
Fotis Polychronis (Pieria)
Video assistant referee:
Pol van Boekel (Netherlands)
Assistant video assistant referee:
Richard Martens (Netherlands)
Offside video assistant referee:

Match rules

- 90 minutes
- 30 minutes of extra time if necessary
- Penalty shoot-out if scores still level
- Twelve named substitutes, of which up to five may be used at maximum three times, with a sixth allowed in extra time.
