= Christos Retsos =

South African soccer player (born 2001)

Personal information
- Full name: Christos Retsos
- Date of birth: 2 May 2001 (age 25)
- Place of birth: Johannesburg, South Africa
- Height: 1.72 m (5 ft 8 in)
- Position: Midfielder

Team information
- Current team: AE Mykonou

Youth career
- 2018–2019: Panionios

Senior career*
Years	Team	Apps	(Gls)
2019–2020	Panionios	4	(0)
2020–2021	SuperSport United	0	(0)
2021–2022	Rodos	5	(0)
2021–2022	Kavala	13	(0)
2022–2023	Irodotos	0	(0)
2023	Aris Petroupolis	15	(1)
2024-	AE Mykonou		
- * Club domestic league appearances and goals as of 27 April 2022

Christos Retsos (Greek: Χρήστος Ρέτσος; born 2 May 2001) is a Greek professional soccer player who plays as a midfielder. He is currently playing for AE Mykonou in Gamma Ethniki.

== International career ==
Retsos was called up to play for the South Africa U23s for 2023 U-23 Africa Cup of Nations qualification matches in March 2023.

== Personal life ==
Born in South Africa to Greek parents, Retsos moved to Greece in his teenage years. He is the younger cousin of fellow footballer, Panagiotis Retsos. He has a younger brother, Karoly, who plays for Ifestos Peristeriou in the EPS Athens league.
