= Greek Super Cup =

Football competition

- Organiser(s): Hellenic Football Federation
- Founded: 1980; 46 years ago (by PSAT); 1987; 39 years ago (by the HFF)
- Region: Greece
- Teams: 2 (1980–present)
- Related competitions: Greek Cup (qualifier); Super League Greece (qualifier)
- Current champions: OFI (1st title)
- Most championships: Olympiacos (5 titles)
- Broadcaster: SKAI TV Channel
- Website: epo.gr
- 2026 Greek Super Cup

The Greek Super Cup (Greek: Σούπερ Καπ Ελλάδος), formerly known as Friendship and Solidarity Cup (Greek: Κύπελλο Φιλίας και Αλληλεγγύης) and now officially known as Superbet Super Cup (Greek: Superbet Σούπερ Καπ) for sponsorship reasons is a Greek association football one-match competition, which is contested annually between the champions of the previous Super League Greece season and the holders of the Greek Cup.

== History ==
From 1948 to 1976 several matches between the Greek champions and the Greek Cup winners were held, but without any official recognition. The institution got officially started in 1980 under PSAT. According to the announcement, if the champions of the Alpha Ethniki and the Cup-winners were the same club, the match would not be held. For various reasons, the institution was interrupted until 1987 when, the HFF reestablished it under the name Friendship and Solidarity Cup, which was held with breaks until 1996. In ten years, seven finals were held in 1987, 1988, 1989, 1992, 1993, 1994 and 1996.

The institution was then abolished, mainly due to the difficulty of controlling fanaticism in derby matches. For example, in 1990, the match between the champion, Panathinaikos and the Cup winner, Olympiacos was cancelled, for fear of incidents due to the tense situation between the fans caused by the transfer of Stratos Apostolakis from the first club to the latter. Matches were also not played in 1991 and 1995, when Panathinaikos won the double, but not in 1997 and 1998. The conquest of the double by Olympiacos in the following year and the general interest of continuing the institution waned, despite the fact that matches could have been held between 2000 and 2003. In the three-year period that followed Panathinaikos and Olympiacos emerged as double winners.

In 2007, the HFF reintroduced the institution under the name "Super Cup", but it was not continued as in the following years Olympiacos and Panathinaikos won the double. In 2011, the match between the champion, Olympiacos and the Cup winner, AEK Athens was scheduled but never took place for unknown reasons. In the following two seasons Olympiacos won the double and the competition was discontinued.

From 1987 to 1994, the institution was held at the Olympic Stadium in Athens, while in 1980, 1996 and 2007 they were held at Karaiskakis Stadium. The matches were single-elimination and in the event of no winner was determined during regular time, a 30 minutes of extra time followed and if there was still no winner, a penalty shoot-out was held, which took place twice: in 1989 and 1996.

On 21 January 2025, at a meeting of the Professional Football Committee, the HFF decided in the restoration of the Greek Super Cup. This time if the champions of the Super League Greece and the Cup-winners were the same club, the match would be held between the champions and the runners-up of the Greek Cup.

== Predecessors of Greek Super Cup ==
Year	Champion	Score	Cup Winner	Venue	Trophy name
1948	Olympiacos	0–3 (1st leg); 0–2 (2nd leg)	Panathinaikos	Leoforos Alexandras Stadium, Ampelokipoi, Athens	Cup of the Champions (unofficial competition) (Greek: Κύπελλον των Πρωταθλητών)
1963	AEK Athens	3–2	Olympiacos	Nikos Goumas Stadium, Nea Filadelfeia, Athens	Athletic Echo Cup (unofficial competition) (Greek: Κύπελλο Αθλητικής Ηχούς)
1970	Panathinaikos	2–1	Aris	Karaiskakis Stadium, Piraeus	Childcare Cup (unofficial competition) (Greek: Κύπελλο Παιδικής Μερίμνης)
1971	AEK Athens	2–2 (1st leg); 1–1 (4–2 p) (2nd leg)	Olympiacos	Karaiskakis Stadium, Piraeus; Nikos Goumas Stadium, Nea Filadelfeia, Athens	Supercup (unofficial competition) (Greek: Υπερκύπελλον)
1976	PAOK	3–2	Iraklis	Kaftanzoglio Stadium, Thessaloniki	Game for the Superclub of the year (unofficial competition) (Greek: Αγώνας για την Υπέρ-ομάδα της χρονιάς)

== Finals ==
Year	Champion	Score	Cup Winner	Venue
PSAT edition
1980	Olympiacos	4–3	Kastoria	Karaiskakis Stadium, Piraeus
HFF editions
1987	Olympiacos	1–0	OFI	Olympic Stadium, Marousi, Athens
1988	AEL	1–3	Panathinaikos	Olympic Stadium, Marousi, Athens
1989	AEK Athens	1–1 (6–5 p)	Panathinaikos	Olympic Stadium, Marousi, Athens
1992	AEK Athens	1–3	Olympiacos	Olympic Stadium, Marousi, Athens
1993	AEK Athens	0–1	Panathinaikos	Olympic Stadium, Marousi, Athens
1994	AEK Athens	0–3	Panathinaikos	Olympic Stadium, Marousi, Athens
1996	Panathinaikos	1–1 (8–9 p)	AEK Athens	Karaiskakis Stadium, Piraeus
2007	Olympiacos	1–0	AEL	Karaiskakis Stadium, Piraeus
2025	Olympiacos	3–0	OFI	Pankritio Stadium, Heraklion
2026	AEK Athens	2–2 (4–5 p)	OFI	Pankritio Stadium, Heraklion

== Performance by club ==
Note: winning years are marked with bold.

Club	Winners	Runners-up	Participation Years
Olympiacos	5	—	1980, 1987, 1992, 2007, 2025
Panathinaikos	3	2	1988, 1989, 1993, 1994, 1996
AEK Athens	2	4	1989, 1992, 1993, 1994, 1996, 2026
OFI	1	2	1987, 2025, 2026
AEL	—	2	1988, 2007
Kastoria	—	1	1980

== Top scorers ==
Rank	Player	Club(s)	Goals
1	(Sweden) Thomas Ahlström	Olympiacos	2
1	(Greece) Antonis Kopanos	Kastoria	2
1	(Greece) Petros Xanthopoulos	Olympiacos	2
1	(Denmark) Claus Nielsen	Panathinaikos	2
5	(Greece) Kostas Bakis	Kastoria	1
5	(Greece) Andreas Voitsidis	Kastoria	1
5	(Greece) Georgios Kokolakis	Olympiacos	1
5	(Australia) Chris Kalantzis	Panathinaikos	1
5	(Greece) Georgios Mitsibonas	AEL	1
5	(Greece) Georgios Christodoulou	AEK Athens	1
5	(Greece) Vangelis Vlachos	Panathinaikos	1
5	(Greece) Alexis Alexandris	AEK Athens	1
5	(Greece) Daniel Batista	Olympiacos	1
5	(Greece) Panagiotis Tsalouchidis	Olympiacos	1
5	(Greece) Vassilis Karapialis	Olympiacos	1
5	(Greece) Dimitris Saravakos	Panathinaikos	1
5	(Greece) Marinos Ouzounidis	Panathinaikos	1
5	(Greece) Stratos Apostolakis	Panathinaikos	1
5	(Greece) Dimitris Markos	Panathinaikos	1
5	(North Macedonia) Toni Savevski	AEK Athens	1
5	(Greece) Alexis Alexoudis	Panathinaikos	1
5	(Greece) Kostas Mitroglou	Olympiacos	1
5	(Iran) Mehdi Taremi	Olympiacos	1
5	(Greece) Alexis Kalogeropoulos	Olympiacos	1
5	(Turkey) Yusuf Yazıcı	Olympiacos	1
5	(Serbia) Luka Jović	AEK Athens	1
5	(Greece) Thanasis Androutsos	OFI	1
5	(Greece) Konstantinos Kostoulas	OFI	1
5	(Angola) Zini	AEK Athens	1

== See also ==
- Super League Greece
- Greek Football Cup
- Greek League Cup
