= Stavros Pilios =

Footballer (born 2000)

Personal information
- Date of birth: 10 December 2000 (age 25)
- Place of birth: Rhodes, Greece
- Height: 1.75 m (5 ft 9 in)
- Positions: Left-back; wing-back

Team information
- Current team: AEK Athens
- Number: 3

Youth career
- 2016–2019: PAS Giannina

Senior career*
Years	Team	Apps	(Gls)
2019–2023	PAS Giannina	32	(0)
2021–2022	→ Iraklis (loan)	28	(2)
2023–	AEK Athens	62	(1)

International career^{‡}
2026–	Albania	7	(0)
- * Club domestic league appearances and goals as of 21 November 2026 ‡ National team caps and goals as of 15 November 2026

Stavros Pilios (Greek: Σταύρος Πήλιος; Albanian: Stavro Pilo; born 10 December 2000) is a professional footballer who plays as a left-back for Super League club AEK Athens. Born in Greece, he represents Albania internationally.

Pilios began his senior career at PAS Giannina, making his professional debut in 2019, before spending the 2021–22 season on loan at Iraklis. He returned to PAS Giannina in 2022 and established himself as the club's first-choice left-back. Pilios joined AEK Athens in 2023 and has since scored in the Super League and UEFA Champions League, provided assists in the UEFA Conference League and helped the club win the 2025–26 Super League title.

== Club career ==
=== PAS Giannina ===
Pilios progressed through the youth ranks of PAS Giannina before signing his first professional contract in January 2019. He made his professional debut on 2 October 2019, starting in a Greek Cup match against Enosis Aspropyrgos. He made his Super League 2 debut on 22 December against A.E. Karaiskakis.

On 21 January 2021, Pilios started in a 2–2 draw against Atromitos in the first leg of the Greek Cup round of 16. Ten days later, he made his Super League debut as a left-back in a 1–0 home defeat to Atromitos, clearing the ball near the goal line in the 67th minute to prevent a second goal. PAS Giannina extended his contract until 2023 on 26 March. He made seven league appearances during the 2020–21 season, five as a starter, totalling 475 minutes.

On 24 August 2021, Pilios joined Iraklis on loan for the 2021–22 season. Pilios established himself as a regular starter, making 30 appearances and scoring twice in the Super League 2, where was praised for his speed, ball control and attacking contributions.

Following his loan spell, he returned to PAS Giannina ahead of the 2022–23 end of the season. He established himself as the club's first-choice left-back, making 23 league appearances, all as a starter, and provided two assists. His performances attracted interest from other Greek clubs, including Olympiacos.

=== AEK Athens ===
On 23 June 2023, AEK Athens announced the Pilo's signing on a four-year contract. During the 2023–24 season, he initially featured for AEK B in the Super League Greece 2, making nine appearances and scoring twice. He made his senior debut on 4 November, coming on as a late substitute in a 1–1 Super League draw against Kifisia. He subsequently established himself in the first team, taking advantage of the opportunities given to him by manager Matías Almeyda at left-back.

Pilo made his UEFA competition debut on 15 August 2024, starting in a 1–0 win over Noah in the 2024–25 UEFA Conference League third qualifying round, although AEK were eliminated 3–2 on aggregate. Three days later, he scored his first goal for AEK and provided an assist in a 3–0 win over OFI Crete, earning the match's MVP award. He was subsequently named Super League Player of the Month for August. He made 17 league appearances in 2024–25, as AEK finished fourth in the Super League.

During the 2025–26 season, Pilo became a regular in AEK's defence under manager Marko Nikolić, forming part of the preferred back four alongside Lazaros Rota, Harold Moukoudi and Filipe Relvas. He helped AEK win the Super League Greece title, alternating with James Penrice at left-back during the season. On 27 November 2025, he assisted the winning goal in a 1–0 away victory over Fiorentina in the UEFA Conference League league phase. In the Conference League quarter-final second leg against Rayo Vallecano on 16 April 2026, his throw-in led to Zini's opening goal in a 3–1 victory, but AEK were eliminated 4–3 on aggregate. On 9 August, he extended his contract until 2030 after recording 40 appearances and six assists across all competitions during the season.

Pilo began the 2026–27 season with an assist in AEK's 4–0 opening Super League win over Iraklis on 22 August. On 14 October, he assisted AEK's opening goal in a 3–1 defeat to Shakhtar Donetsk in the UEFA Champions League league phase, advancing down the left flank before setting up a teammate in the 28th minute. A week later, he scored his first European goal in a 5–1 defeat to Manchester City, netting in the 52nd minute. On 4 November, he scored his second consecutive Champions League goal, giving AEK a 2–1 lead over Real Madrid in the 75th minute; however Kylian Mbappé equalised three minutes later before Federico Valverde scored in stoppage time to secure a 3–2 win for the Spanish side.

== International career ==
On 21 March 2026, Pilios received his first call-up to the Albania national team for the 2026 World Cup qualification play-offs. He made his international debut on 26 March, coming on as a substitute in the 67th minute of a 2–1 defeat to Poland in the play-off semi-final; five minutes later, he had a scoring opportunity saved by the opposing goalkeeper.

He made his first start for Albania on 26 September, playing the full match in a 2–0 2026–27 UEFA Nations League C win over Belarus and helping the team keep a clean sheet, earning praises from local media.

== Personal life ==
Pilios is of Greek origin, with his parents belonging to the Greek minority in Albania and originating from Dropull.

== Career statistics ==
=== Club ===
As of match played 21 November 2026

Club	Season	League			Greek Cup		Europe		Total	
Club	Season	Division	Apps	Goals	Apps	Goals	Apps	Goals	Apps	Goals
PAS Giannina	2019–20	Super League Greece 2	2	0	2	1	—		4	1
PAS Giannina	2020–21	Super League Greece	7	0	1	0	—		8	0
PAS Giannina	2022–23	Super League Greece	23	0	1	0	—		24	0
PAS Giannina	Total		32	0	4	1	—		36	1
Iraklis (loan)	2021–22	Super League Greece 2	28	2	2	0	—		30	2
AEK Athens B	2023–24	Super League Greece 2	9	2	—		—		9	2
AEK Athens	2023–24	Super League Greece	11	0	2	0	—		13	0
AEK Athens	2024–25	Super League Greece	17	1	2	0	1 (Note: Appearance(s) in UEFA Conference League)	0	23	1
AEK Athens	2025–26	Super League Greece	24	0	1	0	15	0	40	0
AEK Athens	2026–27	Super League Greece	10	0	3	0	6	2	19	2
AEK Athens	Total		62	1	8	0	22	2	92	3
Career total			131	5	14	1	22	2	167	8

=== International ===
As of match played 15 November 2026

Appearances and goals by national team and year
National team	Year	Apps	Goals
Albania
Albania	2026	7	0
Total		7	0

== Honours ==
PAS Giannina

- Super League Greece 2: 2019–20

AEK Athens

- Super League Greece: 2025–26

Individual

- Super League Greece Player of the Month: August 2024
