= Zani =

Zani may refer to:

== People ==
- Alice 'Zani' Jacobsen (1928–1993), American sculptor
- Andrea Zani (1696–1757), Italian violinist, composer
- Angelo Vincenzo Zani (born 1950), archbishop, Vatican official
- Celso Zani, also Giuliano Zani (born 1580), Catholic bishop
- Costanzo Zani (1622–1694), Roman Catholic Bishop of Imola
- Federico Zani (born 1989), Italian rugby union player
- Francesco Zani (1938–2026), Italian rugby union player
- Giselda Zani (1909–1975), Uruguayan poet, short story writer, art critic
- Marco Aurelio Zani de Ferranti (1801–1878), Italian classical guitarist, composer
- Marie-Joséphe Zani-Fé Touam-Bona (1933–2001), politician in the Central African Republic
- Marigona Zani (born 1996), Albanian football goalkeeper
- Mauro Zani (born 1949), Italian politician
- Octávio Zani (1902 – date of death unknown), Brazilian athlete

== Places ==
- Ab Zani, village in Kohgiluyeh and Boyer-Ahmad Province, Iran
- Galleh Zani, village in Bushehr Province, Iran
- Kart Zani, village in Hormozgan Province, Iran
- Zani, Iran, village in South Khorasan Province, Iran

== Other ==
- Palazzo Zani, Bologna, Renaissance palace in central Bologna, region of Emilia Romagna, Italy
- Qama Zani, an act of mourning by Shia Muslims of Iran and South Asia
- Zani i Ri (English: New Voice), fortnightly newspaper published in Albania
- Zani Çaushi, Albanian criminal group active in Vlora during 1997–1999
