= 2025–26 AEK Athens F.C. season =

AEK Athens
2025–26 season
- Chairman: Evangelos Aslanidis
- Manager: Marko Nikolić
- Stadium: Agia Sophia Stadium
- Super League: 1st (After play-offs); 1st (Regular season)
- Greek Cup: Quarter-finals
- UEFA Conference League: Quarter-finals
- Top goalscorer: League: Luka Jović (17); All: Luka Jović (21)
- Highest home attendance: 31,100 (vs Olympiacos) (1 February 2026) (vs Rayo Vallecano) (16 April 2026) (vs PAOK) (19 April 2026) (vs Panathinaikos) (10 May 2026) (vs Olympiacos) (17 May 2026)
- Lowest home attendance: 13,853 (vs Hapoel Be'er Sheva) (24 July 2025)
- Average home league attendance: 26,665
- Biggest win: AEK Athens 6–0 Aberdeen
- Biggest defeat: Rayo Vallecano 3–0 AEK Athens
Home colours	Away colours	Third colours

The 2025–26 season was the 102nd season in the existence of AEK Athens F.C. and the 65th competitive season and eleventh consecutive in the top flight of Greek football. They competed in the Super League, the Greek Cup and the Conference League. The season began on 24 July 2025 and finished on 17 May 2026.

== Kits ==
Supplier: Nike
Sponsor(s): Pame stoixima
Features: Seajets, Piraeus Bank

Home	Away	Third

== Management team ==
Position	Staff
Manager	(Serbia) Marko Nikolić
Assistant manager	(Serbia) Radoje Smiljanić
Assistant manager	(Greece) Ilias Kyriakidis
Goalkeeping coach	(Italy) Marco Garofalo
Fitness coach	(Serbia) Goran Basarić
Fitness coach	(Greece) Kostas Konstantopoulos
Fitness coach	(Greece) Giorgos Papaleontiou
Fitness coach	(Greece) Sotiris Mavros
Director of Football	(Spain) Javier Ribalta
Scout	(Italy) Roberto Malfitano
Scout	(Italy) Francesco Panfili
Academy director	(Greece) Georgios Georgiadis
Academy manager	(Serbia) Ivan Nedeljković
Head of Medical	(Greece) Lakis Nikolaou

- Source: aekfc.gr

== Players ==
=== Squad information ===
NOTE: The players are the ones that have been announced by the AEK Athens' press release. No edits should be made unless a player's arrival or exit is announced. Updated 17 May 2026, 23:59 UTC+3.

No.	Player	Nat.	Position(s)	Date of birth (Age)	Signed	Previous club	Transfer fee	Contract until
Goalkeepers
1	Thomas Strakosha	(Albania) (Greece)	GK	19 March 1995 (aged 31)	2024	(England) Brentford	Free	2029
41	Marios Balamotis	(Greece)	GK	6 May 2005 (aged 21)	2025	(Greece) AEK Athens Β	—	2027
81	Angelos Angelopoulos	(Greece)	GK	19 February 2003 (aged 23)	2025	(Greece) AEK Athens Β	—	2027
91	Alberto Brignoli	(Italy)	GK	19 August 1991 (aged 34)	2024	(Greece) Panathinaikos	Free	2027
Defenders
2	Harold Moukoudi (Vice-captain 2)	(Cameroon) (France)	CB	27 November 1997 (aged 28)	2022	(France) Saint-Étienne	Free	2029
3	Stavros Pilios	(Albania) (Greece)	LB / LM	10 December 2000 (aged 25)	2023	(Greece) PAS Giannina	Free	2027
12	Lazaros Rota	(Greece) (Albania)	RB / RM	23 August 1997 (aged 28)	2021	(Netherlands) Fortuna Sittard	Free	2030
15	Martin Georgiev	(Bulgaria)	CB / RB	24 September 2005 (aged 20)	2026	(Bulgaria) Slavia Sofia	€2,000,000	2030
21	Domagoj Vida (Vice-captain)	(Croatia)	CB / RB	29 April 1989 (aged 37)	2022	(Turkey) Beşiktaş	Free	2027
22	Alexander Callens	(Peru) (Spain)	CB / LB	4 May 1992 (aged 34)	2024	(Spain) Girona	€300,000	2026
29	James Penrice	(Scotland)	LB / LM / CM	22 December 1998 (aged 27)	2025	(Scotland) Hearts	€2,300,000	2028
34	Christos Kosidis	(Greece)	CB / RB	28 February 2005 (aged 20)	2025	(Greece) AEK Athens Β	—	2026
44	Filipe Relvas	(Portugal)	CB / LB	20 September 1999 (aged 26)	2025	(Portugal) Vitória Guimarães	€3,500,000	2029
Midfielders
4	Marko Grujić	(Serbia)	DM / CM	13 April 1996 (aged 30)	2025	(Portugal) Porto	Free	2028
6	Jens Jønsson	(Denmark)	DM / CM / CB	10 January 1993 (aged 33)	2022	(Spain) Cádiz	Free	2026
8	Mijat Gaćinović	(Serbia) (Bosnia and Herzegovina)	AM / CM / LM / LW / RM / RW	8 February 1995 (aged 31)	2022	(Germany) Hoffenheim	€1,000,000	2026
10	João Mário	(Portugal) (Angola)	AM / CM / LM / LW / RM / RW	19 January 1993 (aged 33)	2025	(Turkey) Beşiktaş	Free	2026
13	Orbelín Pineda	(Mexico)	AM / CM / LM / LW / RM / RW / SS / DM / RB	24 March 1996 (aged 30)	2023	(Spain) Celta de Vigo	€6,500,000	2027
17	Dimitris Kaloskamis	(Greece)	AM / LM / LW / RM / RW	1 March 2005 (aged 21)	2025	(Greece) Atromitos	€1,100,000	2030
18	Răzvan Marin	(Romania)	CM / AM / DM	23 May 1996 (aged 30)	2025	(Italy) Cagliari	€1,700,000	2028
19	Niclas Eliasson	(Sweden) (Brazil)	RM / LM / RW / LW	7 December 1995 (aged 30)	2022	(France) Nîmes	€2,000,000	2028
20	Petros Mantalos (Captain)	(Greece)	AM / LM / CM / LW / SS / RM / RW / DM	31 August 1991 (aged 34)	2014	(Greece) Xanthi	€500,000	2027
23	Robert Ljubičić	(Croatia) (Austria)	CM / RM / LM / AM / DM / LB	14 July 1999 (aged 26)	2024	(Croatia) Dinamo Zagreb	€4,000,000	2029
37	Roberto Pereyra	(Argentina)	CM / AM / LM / RM / SS	7 January 1991 (aged 35)	2024	(Italy) Udinese	Free	2026
80	Hakim Sahabo	(Rwanda) (Belgium)	CM / AM / DM	16 June 2005 (aged 21)	2026	(Belgium) Standard Liège	€2,500,000	2029
Forwards
7	Dereck Kutesa	(Switzerland) (Angola)	LW / RW / LM / RM / AM / ST	6 December 1997 (aged 28)	2025	(Switzerland) Servette	Free	2028
9	Luka Jović	(Serbia)	ST	23 December 1997 (aged 28)	2025	(Italy) AC Milan	Free	2027
11	Aboubakary Koïta	(Mauritania) (Belgium)	LW / LM / SS / ST / RW / RM	20 September 1998 (aged 27)	2024	(Belgium) Sint-Truidense	€4,000,000	2029
25	Barnabás Varga	(Hungary)	ST	24 October 1994 (aged 31)	2026	(Hungary) Ferencváros	€4,500,000	2029
27	Zois Karargyris	(Greece)	ST	18 August 2007 (aged 18)	2025	(Netherlands) Jong FC Utrecht	—	2029
90	Zini	(Angola)	ST / SS / LW / LM / RW / RM	3 July 2002 (aged 23)	2023	(Angola) 1º de Agosto	€350,000	2029
Left during Summer Transfer Window
26	Anthony Martial	(France)	ST / RW / LW	5 December 1995 (aged 30)	2024	(England) Manchester United	Free	2027
Left during Winter Transfer Window
14	Frantzdy Pierrot	(Haiti) (United States)	ST	29 March 1995 (aged 31)	2024	(Israel) Maccabi Haifa	€2,500,000	2027
24	Gerasimos Mitoglou	(Greece)	CB	20 October 1999 (aged 26)	2021	(Greece) Volos	€300,000	2026
28	Moses Odubajo	(England) (Nigeria)	RB / RM / LB / LM	28 July 1993 (aged 32)	2024	(Greece) Aris	€1,000,000	2026
55	Konstantinos Chrysopoulos	(Greece)	CB	21 May 2003 (aged 23)	2023	(Greece) Aris	€800,000	2028
73	Christoforos Kolimatsis	(Greece)	DM / CM	4 August 2006 (aged 19)	2025	(Greece) AEK Athens Β	—	2029
From U19 Squad
35	Stavros Psyropoulos	(Greece)	CB	21 March 2007 (aged 18)	2025	(Greece) AEK Athens U19	—	2028

== Transfers ==
=== In ===
==== Summer ====
No.	Pos.	Player	From	Fee	Date	Contract Until	Source
4	MF	(Serbia) Marko Grujić	(Portugal) Porto	Free transfer	2 September 2025	30 June 2028	
7	FW	(Switzerland) Dereck Kutesa	(Switzerland) Servette	Free transfer	1 July 2025	30 June 2028	
9	FW	(Serbia) Luka Jović	(Italy) AC Milan	Free transfer	5 August 2025	30 June 2027	
17	MF	(Greece) Dimitris Kaloskamis	(Greece) Atromitos	€1,200,000	17 June 2025	30 June 2030	
18	MF	(Romania) Răzvan Marin	(Italy) Cagliari	€1,700,000	23 July 2025	30 June 2028	
27	FW	(Greece) Zois Karargyris	(Netherlands) Jong FC Utrecht	Free transfer	1 August 2025	30 June 2029	
29	DF	(Scotland) James Penrice	(Scotland) Hearts	€2,300,000	5 July 2025	30 June 2028	
32	FW	(Argentina) Elián Sosa	(Greece) AEK Athens Β	Promotion	1 July 2025	30 June 2028	
34	DF	(Greece) Christos Kosidis	(Greece) AEK Athens Β	Promotion	1 July 2025	30 June 2026	
41	GK	(Greece) Marios Balamotis	(Greece) AEK Athens Β	Promotion	1 July 2025	30 June 2027	
44	DF	(Portugal) Filipe Relvas	(Portugal) Vitória Guimarães	€3,500,000	28 June 2025	30 June 2029	
55	DF	(Greece) Konstantinos Chrysopoulos	(Cyprus) Anorthosis Famagusta	Loan return	1 July 2025	30 June 2028	
60	DF	(Australia) Dimitri Valkanis	(Greece) AEK Athens Β	Promotion	1 July 2025	30 June 2027	
73	MF	(Greece) Christoforos Kolimatsis	(Greece) AEK Athens Β	Promotion	1 July 2025	30 June 2029	
80	MF	(Ivory Coast) Hamed Kader Fofana	(Greece) AEK Athens Β	Promotion	1 July 2025	30 June 2029	
81	GK	(Greece) Angelos Angelopoulos	(Greece) AEK Athens Β	Promotion	1 July 2025	30 June 2027	
87	FW	(Greece) Vasilios Kontonikos	(Greece) AEK Athens Β	Promotion	1 July 2025	30 June 2029	
88	FW	(Greece) Markos Nino	(Greece) AEK Athens Β	Promotion	1 July 2025	30 June 2026	
90	FW	(Angola) Zini	(Greece) Levadiakos	Loan return	1 July 2025	30 June 2028	
96	DF	(Greece) Alexandros Parras	(Greece) AEK Athens Β	Promotion	1 July 2025	30 June 2026	
—	DF	(Bosnia and Herzegovina) Vedad Radonja	(Greece) Lamia	Loan return	1 July 2025	30 June 2026	
—	FW	(Greece) Michalis Kosidis	(Greece) AEK Athens Β	Promotion	1 July 2025	30 June 2026	

==== Winter ====
No.	Pos.	Player	From	Fee	Date	Contract Until	Source
15	DF	(Bulgaria) Martin Georgiev	(Bulgaria) Slavia Sofia	€2,000,000	30 December 2025	30 June 2030	
25	FW	(Hungary) Barnabás Varga	(Hungary) Ferencváros	€4,500,000	6 January 2026	30 June 2029	
80	MF	(Rwanda) Hakim Sahabo	(Belgium) Standard Liège	€2,500,000	31 January 2026	30 June 2029	
—	GK	(Greece) Dimitris Goumas	(Finland) PK-35	Loan return	1 January 2026	30 June 2027	

=== Out ===
==== Summer ====
No.	Pos.	Player	To	Fee	Date	Source
4	MF	(Poland) Damian Szymański	(Poland) Legia Warsaw	€1,200,000	14 August 2025	
9	FW	(Argentina) Erik Lamela	Retired		14 August 2025	
16	FW	(Greece) Sotiris Tsiloulis	(Greece) Atromitos	Free transfer	15 July 2025	
26	FW	(France) Anthony Martial	(Mexico) Monterrey	€1,000,000	12 September 2025	
27	DF	(Bosnia and Herzegovina) Vedad Radonja	Free agent	Contract termination	1 July 2025	
28	DF	(Iran) Ehsan Hajsafi	(Iran) Sepahan	End of contract	20 July 2025	
35	FW	(Greece) Michalis Kosidis	(Poland) Zagłębie Lubin	€200,000	4 July 2025	
—	GK	(Austria) Cican Stanković	Free agent	End of contract	1 July 2025	

==== Winter ====
No.	Pos.	Player	To	Fee	Date	Source
24	DF	(Greece) Gerasimos Mitoglou	(Greece) Atromitos	Free transfer^{[a]}	16 January 2026	
28	DF	(England) Moses Odubajo	(Cyprus) Omonia	Free transfer	21 January 2026	
—	GK	(Greece) Dimitris Goumas	(Greece) Egaleo	Free transfer	17 January 2026	

Notes

a. AEK keeps a percentage of the player's rights.

=== Loan in ===
==== Summer ====
No.	Pos.	Player	From	Fee	Date	Until	Option to buy	Source
10	MF	(Portugal) João Mário	(Turkey) Beşiktaş	Free	12 September 2025	30 June 2026	✗	

=== Loan out ===
==== Summer ====
No.	Pos.	Player	To	Fee	Date	Until	Option to buy	Source
22	MF	(Spain) Paolo Fernandes	(Saudi Arabia) Al-Khaleej	Free	4 August 2025	30 June 2026	✗	
32	FW	(Argentina) Elián Sosa	(Cyprus) Anorthosis Famagusta	Free	12 August 2025	30 June 2026	✗	
60	DF	(Australia) Dimitri Valkanis	(Australia) Brisbane Roar	Free	12 August 2025	30 June 2026	✗	
80	MF	(Ivory Coast) Hamed Kader Fofana	(Greece) Iraklis	Free	30 July 2025	30 June 2026	✗	
87	FW	(Greece) Vasilios Kontonikos	(Greece) PAS Giannina	Free	11 September 2025	30 June 2026	✗	
88	FW	(Greece) Markos Nino	(Greece) Hellas Syros	Free	15 September 2025	30 June 2026	✗	
96	DF	(Greece) Alexandros Parras	(Slovenia) Domžale	Free	11 September 2025	30 June 2026	✗	

==== Winter ====
No.	Pos.	Player	To	Fee	Date	Until	Option to buy	Source
14	FW	(Haiti) Frantzdy Pierrot	(Turkey) Rizespor	Free	6 February 2026	30 June 2026	✓	
55	DF	(Greece) Konstantinos Chrysopoulos	(Italy) Mantova	Free	21 January 2026	30 June 2026	✓	
73	MF	(Greece) Christoforos Kolimatsis	(Greece) Hellas Syros	Free	9 January 2026	30 June 2026	✗	

=== Contract renewals ===
No.	Pos.	Player	Date	Former Exp. Date	New Exp. Date	Source
2	DF	(Cameroon) Harold Moukoudi	30 September 2025	30 June 2028	30 June 2029	
12	DF	(Greece) Lazaros Rota	25 November 2025	30 June 2026	30 June 2030	
20	MF	(Greece) Petros Mantalos	22 March 2026	30 June 2026	30 June 2027	
21	DF	(Croatia) Domagoj Vida	29 April 2026	30 June 2026	30 June 2027	
90	FW	(Angola) Zini	10 October 2025	30 June 2028	30 June 2029	

=== Overall transfer activity ===
==== Expenditure ====
Summer: ▼€8,700,000

Winter: ▼€9,000,000

Total: ▼€17,700,000

==== Income ====
Summer: ▲€2,400,000

Winter: ▲€0

Total: ▲€2,400,000

==== Net Totals ====
Summer: ▼€6,300,000

Winter: ▼€9,000,000

Total: ▼€15,300,000

== Pre-season and friendlies ==
28 June 2025 Friendly	FC De Westhoek	0–6	AEK Athens	Burgh-Haamstede
14:00 EEST (UTC+3)		Report	Kutesa 2'; Eliasson 10', 30', 39'; Golfinos 65'; Fernandes 69'	Stadium: Sportpark van Zuijen

2 July 2025 Friendly	AEK Athens	0–2	Zulte Waregem	Burgh-Haamstede
19:00 EEST (UTC+3)		Report	Opoku 8'; Emeka 75'	Stadium: Sportpark van Zuijen

6 July 2025 Friendly	AEK Athens	4–1	Beerschot	Burgh-Haamstede
19:00 EEST (UTC+3)	Ljubičić 10'; Pierrot 27'; Relvas (yellow card) 38'; Pereyra 44'; Szymański (yellow card) 77'; Gacinovic 88'	Report	Vargas 90'	Stadium: Sportpark van Zuijen

9 July 2025 Friendly	AEK Athens	2–1	K.V. Kortrijk	Burgh-Haamstede
19:00 EEST (UTC+3)	Pereyra 67'; Zini 88'; Mantalos (penalty missed) 90+1'; Koïta (yellow card) 90+2'	Report	Lambert 28'; Cissé (yellow card) 84'	Stadium: Sportpark van Zuijen

17 July 2025 Friendly	AEK Athens	1–0	Omonia	Nea Filadelfeia
21:00 EEST (UTC+3)	Zini 53'	Report	Panagiotou (yellow card) 48'	Stadium: Agia Sophia Stadium; Referee: Angelos Evangelou (Athens)

8 September 2025 Friendly	AEK Athens	2–0	PAS Giannina	Spata
11:00 EEST (UTC+3)	Martial; Kaloskamis	Report		Stadium: Spata Training Centre; Attendance: Behind closed doors
Note: 70-minute match.

31 March 2026 Friendly	AEK Athens	5–0	Nea Salamina	Spata
				Stadium: Spata Training Centre

27 April 2026 Friendly	AEK Athens	7–1	Krasava Ypsonas	Nea Filadelfeia
12:00 EEST (UTC+3)	Zini; Marin; Gacinovic; João Mário	Report	Davidian	Stadium: Agia Sophia Stadium; Attendance: Behind closed doors

== Competitions ==
=== Overall record ===
Competition	First match	Last match	Starting round	Final position	Record							
Competition	First match	Last match	Starting round	Final position	Pld	W	D	L	GF	GA	GD	Win %
Super League	24 August 2025	22 March 2026	Matchday 1	1st	26	18	6	2	49	17	+32	69.23
Super League Play-offs	5 April 2026	17 May 2026	Matchday 1	Winners	6	3	3	0	8	3	+5	50.00
Greek Cup	17 September 2025	14 January 2026	League Phase	Quarter-finals	5	4	0	1	6	2	+4	80.00
UEFA Conference League	24 July 2025	16 April 2026	Second qualifying round	Quarter-finals	16	9	4	3	30	18	+12	56.25
Total					53	34	13	6	93	40	+53	64.15

Last updated: 17 May 2026
Source: Competitions

=== Super League Greece ===
==== Regular season ====
===== League table =====
Pos	Team	Pld	W	D	L	GF	GA	GD	Pts	Qualification or relegation
1	AEK Athens	26	18	6	2	49	17	+32	60	Qualification for the Championship play-offs
2	Olympiacos	26	17	7	2	45	11	+34	58	Qualification for the Championship play-offs
3	PAOK	26	17	6	3	52	17	+35	57	Qualification for the Championship play-offs
4	Panathinaikos	26	14	7	5	44	26	+18	49	Qualification for the Championship play-offs
5	Levadiakos	26	12	6	8	51	37	+14	42	Qualification for the Europe play-offs

Source: Super League Greece
Rules for classification: 1) Points; 2) Head-to-head points; 3) Head-to-head goal difference; 4) Overall goal difference; 5) Goals scored; 6) Total wins; 7) Away goals scored; 8) Away wins.

===== Results summary =====
Overall								Home						Away					
Pld	W	D	L	GF	GA	GD	Pts	W	D	L	GF	GA	GD	W	D	L	GF	GA	GD
26	18	6	2	49	17	+32	60	11	1	1	25	5	+20	7	5	1	24	12	+12

Last updated: 2026-03-22.
Source: Super League Greece

===== Results by Matchday =====
Round	1	2	3	4	5	6	7	8	9	10	11	12	13	14	15	16	17	18	19	20	21	22	23	24	25	26
Ground	H	H	A	A	H	A	H	A	H	A	H	A	H	A	H	A	H	A	H	A	A	H	A	H	A	H
Result	W	W	W	D	W	W	L	L	W	W	W	W	W	W	W	D	W	W	D	W	D	W	D	W	D	W
Position	2	2	2	2	2	1	3	3	3	3	3	3	3	2	1	3	2	1	1	1	1	1	3	1	3	1

Updated to match(es) played on 22 March 2026. Source: slgr.gr
A = Away; H = Home; W = Win; D = Draw; L = Loss; P = Postponed

===== Matches =====
24 August 2025 1	AEK Athens	2–0	Panserraikos	Nea Filadelfeia
20:15 EEST (UTC+3)	Mantalos 23' (pen.); Zini 27'; Pineda (yellow card) 90+3'	Report	Liasos (yellow card) 39'	Stadium: Agia Sophia Stadium; Attendance: 19,219; Referee: Fotis Polychronis (Pieria); Man of the Match: Petros Mantalos

31 August 2025 2	AEK Athens	1–0	Asteras Tripolis	Nea Filadelfeia
20:00 EEST (UTC+3)	Pierrot (yellow card) 4', (goal) 38'; Mantalos (yellow card) 82'; Jović (yellow card) 88'	Report	Šipčić (yellow card) 23'; Castaño (yellow card) 71'	Stadium: Agia Sophia Stadium; Attendance: 19,219; Referee: Alexandros Tsakalidis (Chalkidiki); Man of the Match: Frantzdy Pierrot

14 September 2025 3	Levadiakos	0–1	AEK Athens	Livadeia
20:00 EEST (UTC+3)	Kosti (yellow card) 65'; Verbič (yellow card) 86'	Report	Kutesa (yellow card) 54'; Koïta 69'; Ljubičić (yellow card) 84'	Stadium: Levadia Municipal Stadium; Attendance: 3,013; Referee: Anastasios Papapetrou (Athens); Man of the Match: Aboubakary Koïta

21 September 2025 4	AEL	1–1	AEK Athens	Larissa
17:30 EEST (UTC+3)	Atanasov (yellow card) 20'; Pasas (yellow card) 45+2'; Pérez (yellow card) 62'; Pantelakis (yellow card) 66'; Chakla 75'	Report	Mantalos 55'	Stadium: AEL FC Arena; Attendance: 8,564; Referee: Dimitrios Moschou (Lasithi); Man of the Match: Petros Mantalos

28 September 2025 5	AEK Athens	1–0	Volos	Nea Filadelfeia
17:00 EEST (UTC+3)	Penrice (yellow card) 44'; Pierrot 54'; Relvas (yellow card) 63'; Rota (yellow card) 80'	Report	Fortuna (yellow card) 80'; Martínez (yellow card) 81'	Stadium: Agia Sophia Stadium; Attendance: 21,911; Referee: Vasilis Fotias (Pella); Man of the Match: Frantzdy Pierrot

5 October 2025 6	A.E. Kifisia	2–3	AEK Athens	Peristeri
18:00 EEST (UTC+3)	Tetei (penalty missed) 7', 14'; Pantelidis 29'; Larouci (yellow card) 33'; Antonisse (yellow card) 57'; Botía (yellow card) 90+1'	Report	Moukoudi (yellow card) 6'; Strakosha (yellow card) 6'; Vida (yellow card) 34'; Mantalos (yellow card) 39'; Kaloskamis 44'; Pierrot (yellow card) 45+6'; Relvas (red card) 48'; Jović 60'; Rota (yellow card) 62'; Marin 90+2' (pen.)	Stadium: Peristeri Stadium; Attendance: 2,015; Referee: Christos Vergetis (Arcadia); Man of the Match: Luka Jović

19 October 2025 7	AEK Athens	0–2	PAOK	Nea Filadelfeia
21:00 EEST (UTC+3)	Vida (yellow card) 44'; Moukoudi (red card) 86'; Pineda (yellow card) 90+1'	Report	Baba 45'; Konstantelias 49'; Tsiftsis (yellow card) 90+2'	Stadium: Agia Sophia Stadium; Attendance: 29,210; Referee: Sascha Stegemann (Germany); Man of the Match: Andrija Živković

26 October 2025 8	Olympiacos	2–0	AEK Athens	Piraeus
21:00 EET (UTC+2)	Podence (yellow card) 24'; El Kaabi 33' (pen.); García (yellow card) 35'; Taremi 67'; Retsos (yellow card) 73'	Report	Koïta (yellow card) 62'; Mantalos (yellow card) 66'	Stadium: Georgios Karaiskakis Stadium; Attendance: 32,930; Referee: Tobias Stieler (Germany); Man of the Match: Mehdi Taremi

2 November 2025 9	AEK Athens	1–0	Panetolikos	Nea Filadelfeia
21:00 EET (UTC+2)	Vida (yellow card) 19'; Relvas (yellow card) 41'; Rota (yellow card) 79'; Jović (yellow card) 81'; Pilios (yellow card) 81'; Pineda 90+2'	Report	Kontouris (yellow card) 26'; Mățan (yellow card) 90+1'	Stadium: Agia Sophia Stadium; Attendance: 19,921; Referee: Ioannis Papadopoulos (Macedonia); Man of the Match: Orbelín Pineda

9 November 2025 10	OFI	0–1	AEK Athens	Heraklion
17:30 EET (UTC+2)	Apostolakis (yellow card) 39'; Faitakis (yellow card) 90+3'	Report	Moukoudi (yellow card) 29'; Gaćinović (yellow card) 40'; Pineda 74'	Stadium: Pankritio Stadium; Attendance: 8,711; Referee: Alexandros Tsakalidis (Chalkidiki); Man of the Match: Orbelín Pineda

23 November 2025 11	AEK Athens	1–0	Aris	Nea Filadelfeia
21:00 EET (UTC+2)	Pineda (yellow card) 12'; Penrice (yellow card) 63'; Zini 77', (yellow card) 78'	Report	Pérez (yellow card) 50'; Álvaro (yellow card) 81'	Stadium: Agia Sophia Stadium; Attendance: 26,321; Referee: Harm Osmers (Germany); Man of the Match: Zini

30 November 2025 12	Panathinaikos	2–3	AEK Athens	Ampelokipoi
21:00 EET (UTC+2)	Calabria (yellow card) 41'; Touba (yellow card) 45+1' (yellow-red card) 64'; Palmer-Brown (yellow card) 54'; Tetê 71'; Đuričić (yellow card) 78', (goal) 90'	Report	Jović 16', 45+2' (pen.), 90+3' (pen.); Pilios (yellow card) 27'; Gaćinović (yellow card) 29'; Marin (yellow card) 50' (yellow-red card) 85'; Penrice (yellow card) 78'	Stadium: Leoforos Alexandras Stadium; Attendance: 13,656; Referee: Robert Schröder (Germany); Man of the Match: Luka Jović

7 December 2025 13	AEK Athens	4–1	Atromitos	Nea Filadelfeia
21:00 EET (UTC+2)	Pineda 18'; Jović 65' (pen.), 70'; Ljubičić 87'; Pilios (yellow card) 90+1'	Report	Stavropoulos (yellow card) 53'; Tsantilas 73'; Tsakmakis (yellow card) 74'; Tsingaras (yellow card) 85'	Stadium: Agia Sophia Stadium; Attendance: 23,218; Referee: Spyros Zabalas (Epirus)

14 December 2025 14	Panetolikos	0–5	AEK Athens	Agrinio
17:30 EET (UTC+2)	García (yellow card) 76'; Agapakis (yellow card) 81'	Report	Pineda 26'; Rota (yellow card) 32'; João Mário 34'; Ljubičić 62', 65'; Grujić (yellow card) 75'; Chrysopoulos 77'	Stadium: Panetolikos Stadium; Attendance: 2,902; Referee: Anastasios Papapetrou (Athens); Man of the Match: Robert Ljubičić

21 December 2025 15	AEK Athens	2–1	OFI	Nea Filadelfeia
21:00 EET (UTC+2)	Penrice (yellow card) 44'; Jović (penalty missed) 45+3', 68'; Ljubičić 54', (yellow card) 76'; Mantalos (yellow card) 71'	Report	Salcedo 2', (yellow card) 55'; González (yellow card) 45+1'; Krizmanić (yellow card) 59'; Neira (yellow card) 89'	Stadium: Agia Sophia Stadium; Attendance: 29,210; Referee: Vasilis Fotias (Pella); Man of the Match: Luka Jović

11 January 2026 16	Aris	1–1	AEK Athens	Thessaloniki
19:30 EET (UTC+2)	Jensen 11'; Kadewere (yellow card) 39'; Athanasiadis (yellow card) 66'; Monchu (yellow card) 90+3'	Report	Koïta 9', (yellow card) 39'; Pineda (yellow card) 30'	Stadium: Kleanthis Vikelidis Stadium; Attendance: 4,753; Referee: Rohit Saggi (Norway); Man of the Match: Fredrik Jensen

18 January 2026 17	AEK Athens	4–0	Panathinaikos	Nea Filadelfeia
21:00 EET (UTC+2)	Jović 15', 57', 65', 78'; Gaćinović (yellow card) 59'	Report	Jedvaj (yellow card) 45+2'	Stadium: Agia Sophia Stadium; Attendance: 30,921; Referee: Rade Obrenović (Slovenia); Man of the Match: Luka Jović

24 January 2026 18	Asteras Tripolis	0–1	AEK Athens	Tripoli
19:30 EET (UTC+2)	Muñoz (yellow card) 19'; Sylla (yellow card) 58'	Report	Jović 38', (yellow card) 86'; Koïta (yellow card) 55'; Relvas (yellow card) 61'; Rota (yellow card) 67'	Stadium: Theodoros Kolokotronis Stadium; Attendance: 4,073; Referee: Angelos Evangelou (Athens); Man of the Match: Luka Jović

1 February 2026 19	AEK Athens	1–1	Olympiacos	Nea Filadelfeia
21:00 EET (UTC+2)	Varga 59'; Koïta (yellow card) 82'; Marin (yellow card) 90+2'; Moukoudi (yellow card) 90+3'	Report	Costinha (yellow card) 20'; Hezze (yellow card) 52'; Podence (yellow card) 61'; Taremi (yellow card) 68', (goal) 90+16' (pen.); Retsos (yellow card) 90+15'	Stadium: Agia Sophia Stadium; Attendance: 31,100; Referee: Danny Makkelie (Netherlands); Man of the Match: Filipe Relvas

8 February 2026 20	Panserraikos	0–4	AEK Athens	Serres
16:00 EET (UTC+2)	Volnei (yellow card) 27' (yellow-red card) 88'; Kalinin (yellow card) 61'; Ben Sallam (yellow card) 80'	Report	Penrice (yellow card) 29'; Pineda (yellow card) 52'; Varga 55', 90+4'; Marin (yellow card) 63', (goal) 89' (pen.); Grujić 90+1'	Stadium: Serres Municipal Stadium; Attendance: 4,897; Referee: Athanasios Tzilos (Larissa); Man of the Match: Răzvan Marin

15 February 2026 21	PAOK	0–0	AEK Athens	Thessaloniki
19:30 EET (UTC+2)	Giakoumakis (penalty missed) 12'; Živković (yellow card) 33'; Camara (yellow card) 55'; Kędziora (yellow card) 84'	Report	Varga (yellow card) 56'; Relvas (yellow card) 83'; Kutesa (yellow card) 84'; Strakosha (yellow card) 85'	Stadium: Toumba Stadium; Attendance: 25,022; Referee: Harm Osmers (Germany); Man of the Match: Orbelín Pineda

22 February 2026 22	AEK Athens	4–0	Levadiakos	Nea Filadelfeia
20:00 EET (UTC+2)	Moukoudi 5'; Varga (yellow card) 42'; Jović 49'; Mantalos 59'; Marin (yellow card) 15', (goal) 68'; João Mário (yellow card) 83'	Report	Goumas (yellow card) 38'; Balzi (yellow card) 83'	Stadium: Agia Sophia Stadium; Attendance: Behind closed doors Referee: Christos Vergetis (Arcadia); Man of the Match: Petros Mantalos
Note: The match was played behind closed doors due to AEK receiving a 1-game ban for objects thrown at the end of AEK–Olympiacos

1 March 2026 23	Volos	2–2	AEK Athens	Volos
17:30 EET (UTC+2)	Comba 14', (yellow card) 19'; Hurtado 61' (pen.); Bouzoukis (yellow card) 65'; González (yellow card) 79'; Kargas (yellow card) 81'; Makni (yellow card) 89'; Siampanis (yellow card) 90+6'	Report	Varga 34'; Jović (yellow card) 45+6'; Koïta (yellow card) 66'; Gaćinović (yellow card) 82'; Relvas 90+8'	Stadium: Panthessaliko Stadium; Attendance: 19,665; Referee: Stavros Tsimenteridis (Kozani); Man of the Match: Jan Carlos Hurtado

7 March 2026 24	AEK Athens	1–0	AEL	Nea Filadelfeia
18:00 EET (UTC+2)	Moukoudi 5'; Eliasson (yellow card) 45+6'; Jović (penalty missed) 56; Relvas (yellow card) 90'	Report	Ólafsson (yellow card) 75'; Iliadis (yellow card) 78'; Sourlis (yellow card) 84'	Stadium: Agia Sophia Stadium; Attendance: 30,214; Referee: Fotis Polychronis (Pieria); Man of the Match: Harold Moukoudi

15 March 2026 25	Atromitos	2–2	AEK Athens	Peristeri
19:30 EET (UTC+2)	Karamanis (yellow card) 18'; Mitoglou 33'; Moutoussamy 71'; Pnevmonidis (yellow card) 90+5'	Report	Penrice (yellow card) 48'; Jović 63', 69'; Rota (yellow card) 90+6'	Stadium: Peristeri Stadium; Attendance: 3,828; Referee: Angelos Evangelou (Athens); Man of the Match: Luka Jović

22 March 2026 26	AEK Athens	3–0	A.E. Kifisia	Nea Filadelfeia
19:00 EET (UTC+2)	Jović 5' (pen.); Petkov 16' (o.g.); Varga 26'; Pilios (yellow card) 47'	Report	Larouci (yellow card) 4'; Chouchoumis (yellow card) 29'; Roukounakis (yellow card) 77'; Theodoridis (yellow card) 87'	Stadium: Agia Sophia Stadium; Attendance: 26,218; Referee: Vasilis Fotias (Pella); Man of the Match: Aboubakary Koïta

==== Championship play-offs ====
===== Table =====
Pos	Team	Pld	W	D	L	GF	GA	GD	Pts	Qualification
1	AEK Athens (C)	32	21	9	2	57	20	+37	72	Qualification for the Champions League play-off round
2	Olympiacos	32	19	9	4	51	17	+34	66	Qualification for the Champions League third qualifying round (Note: Olympiacos, as one of the two clubs with the highest club coefficient that would otherwise have entered the League Path second qualifying round, will enter the League Path third qualifying round, due to the rebalancing of the default access list.)
3	PAOK	32	18	10	4	59	25	+34	64	Qualification for the Europa League second qualifying round
4	Panathinaikos	32	14	10	8	47	33	+14	52	Qualification for the Conference League second qualifying round

Source: Super League Greece
Rules for classification: 1) Points; 2) Head-to-head points (Regular season and play-off); 3) Head-to-head goal difference (Regular season and play-off); 4) Regular season position.
(C) Champions

===== Results summary =====
Overall								Home						Away					
Pld	W	D	L	GF	GA	GD	Pts	W	D	L	GF	GA	GD	W	D	L	GF	GA	GD
6	3	3	0	8	3	+5	12	2	1	0	6	2	+4	1	2	0	2	1	+1

Last updated: 2026-05-10.
Source: Super League Greece

===== Results by Matchday =====
Round	1	2	3	4	5	6
Ground	A	H	A	H	A	H
Result	W	W	D	W	D	D
Position	1	1	1	1	1	1

Updated to match(es) played on 17 May 2026. Source: Super League Greece
A = Away; H = Home; W = Win; D = Draw; L = Loss; P = Postponed

===== Matches =====
5 April 2026 1	Olympiacos	0–1	AEK Athens	Piraeus
21:00 EEST (UTC+3)	García (yellow card) 34'	Report	Koïta 5'; Pereyra (yellow card) 31'; Penrice (yellow card) 67'	Stadium: Karaiskakis Stadium; Attendance: 32,850; Referee: Tobias Stieler (Germany); Man of the Match: Aboubakary Koïta

19 April 2026 2	AEK Athens	3–0	PAOK	Nea Filadelfeia
18:00 EEST (UTC+3)	Gaćinović (yellow card) 30'; Kędziora 36' (o.g.); Koïta 73'; Pineda 80'	Report	Sánchez (yellow card) 4'; Zafeiris (yellow card) 47'; Konstantelias (yellow card) 51'	Stadium: Agia Sophia Stadium; Attendance: 31,100; Referee: Jesús Gil Manzano (Spain); Man of the Match: Orbelín Pineda

3 May 2026 3	Panathinaikos	0–0	AEK Athens	Ampelokipoi
21:00 EEST (UTC+3)	Hernández (red card) 17'; Ingason (yellow card) 39'	Report	Georgiev (yellow card) 29'; Pilios (yellow card) 42'; Relvas (yellow card) 45'; Vida (yellow card) 69'; João Mário (yellow card) 87'; Marin (yellow card) 90+3'	Stadium: Leoforos Alexandras Stadium; Attendance: 8,608; Referee: Halil Umut Meler (Turkey); Man of the Match: Alban Lafont
Note: Georgiev and Vida received their yellow cards while being on the bench.

10 May 2026 4	AEK Athens	2–1	Panathinaikos	Nea Filadelfeia
19:30 EEST (UTC+3)	Moukoudi (yellow card) 18'; Relvas (yellow card) 34'; Strakosha (yellow card) 64'; Zini 72'; Pineda (yellow card) 85'; João Mário 90+3'	Report	Calabria (yellow card) 42'; Tetteh (yellow card) 61', (goal) 62'; Lafont (yellow card) 81'	Stadium: Agia Sophia Stadium; Attendance: 31,100; Referee: Harm Osmers (Germany); Man of the Match: Zini

13 May 2026 5	PAOK	1–1	AEK Athens	Thessaloniki
19:30 EEST (UTC+3)	Baba (yellow card) 48'; Bianco (yellow card) 77'; Živković (yellow card) 84'; Mythou 88'	Report	Koïta (yellow card) 10'; Jović 73'	Stadium: Toumba Stadium; Attendance: 14,390; Referee: Sven Jablonski (Germany); Man of the Match: Anestis Mythou

17 May 2026 6	AEK Athens	1–1	Olympiacos	Nea Filadelfeia
19:30 EEST (UTC+3)	Jović (yellow card) 27'; Moukoudi (yellow card) 43'; Koïta 72'; Rota (yellow card) 90'	Report	Rodinei 41', (yellow card) 68'; Podence (yellow card) 45'; Pirola (yellow card) 74'	Stadium: Agia Sophia Stadium; Attendance: 31,100; Referee: Andrea Colombo (Italy); Man of the Match: Aboubakary Koïta

=== Greek Cup ===
==== League phase ====
Round	1	2	3	4
Ground	A	H	A	H
Result	W	W	W	W
Position	6	3	4	3
Points	3	6	9	12

Source: epo.gr
A = Away; H = Home; W = Win; D = Draw; L = Loss

==== Matches ====
17 September 2025 1	Egaleo	0–1	AEK Athens	Aigaleo
16:00 EEST (UTC+3)	Takesian (yellow card) 44'; Kosteas (yellow card) 79'; Kariqi (yellow card) 84'	Report	Odubajo (yellow card) 10'; Pierrot 23'; Kaloskamis (yellow card) 48'; Vida (yellow card) 79'	Stadium: Stavros Mavrothalassitis Stadium; Referee: Konstantinos Katikos (Athens); Man of the Match: Frantzdy Pierrot

24 September 2025 2	AEK Athens	2–1	Panetolikos	Nea Filadelfeia
19:00 EEST (UTC+3)	Pierrot 26'; Kaloskamis 45+1'; Odubajo (yellow card) 59'; Jović (yellow card) 90+4'	Report	Sielis (yellow card) 50'; Kontouris (yellow card) 62'; Manrique (yellow card) 72'; Aguirre 90+2' (pen.)	Stadium: Agia Sophia Stadium; Attendance: 15,221; Referee: Stavros Tsimenteridis (Kozani); Man of the Match: Dimitris Kaloskamis

29 October 2025 3	Ilioupoli	0–1	AEK Athens	Ilioupoli
15:30 EET (UTC+2)	Tsilingiris (yellow card) 90+3'; Maidanos (yellow card) 90+5'	Report	Kaloskamis 90+6'	Stadium: Ilioupoli Municipal Stadium; Referee: Giorgos Kokkinos (Chalkidiki); Man of the Match: Dimitris Kaloskamis

3 December 2025 4	AEK Athens	2–0	OFI	Nea Filadelfeia
17:30 EET (UTC+2)	Pereyra 19'; Jović (yellow card) 33'; João Mário 62'	Report	Kostoulas (yellow card) 14'; Nuss (yellow card) 36'; Bainović (yellow card) 54'; Lewis (yellow card) 55'	Stadium: Agia Sophia Stadium; Referee: Angelos Evangelou (Athens); Man of the Match: Roberto Pereyra

==== Quarter-finals ====
14 January 2026 Quarter-finals	AEK Athens	0–1	OFI	Nea Filadelfeia
17:00 EET (UTC+2)	Mantalos (yellow card) 22'; Pineda (yellow card) 71'; Relvas (yellow card) 90+8'	Report	Giannis Apostolakis (yellow card) 13'; Krizmanić (yellow card) 74'; Salcedo 80'; Androutsos (yellow card) 85'; Nuss (yellow card) 90+7' (yellow-red card) 90+9'; Lampropoulos (red card) 90+8'	Stadium: Agia Sophia Stadium; Referee: Anastasios Papapetrou (Athens)

=== UEFA Conference League ===
==== Second qualifying round ====
The draw for the second qualifying round was held on 18 June 2025.

24 July 2025 First leg	AEK Athens (Greece)	1–0	(Israel) Hapoel Be'er Sheva	Athens, Greece
21:00 EEST (UTC+3)	Pereyra (yellow card) 42'; Relvas 50'; Ljubičić (yellow card) 69'; Pilios (yellow card) 78'	Report	Zlatanović (yellow card) 42'; Elias (yellow card) 67'; Garita (yellow card) 85'	Stadium: Agia Sophia Stadium; Attendance: 21,123; Referee: Luca Pairetto (Italy)

31 July 2025 Second leg	Hapoel Be'er Sheva (Israel)	0–0 (0–1 agg.)	(Greece) AEK Athens	Nyíregyháza, Hungary
21:00 EEST (UTC+3)	Blorian (yellow card) 30'; Baltaxa (yellow card) 57'	Report	Koïta (yellow card) 2'	Stadium: Városi Stadion; Attendance: 431; Referee: Urs Schnyder (Switzerland); Man of the Match: Răzvan Marin

==== Third qualifying round ====
7 August 2025 First leg	Aris Limassol (Cyprus)	2–2	(Greece) AEK Athens	Kolossi, Cyprus
19:00 EEST (UTC+3)	Kakoullis 18'; Goldson 31', (yellow card) 55'; Caju (yellow card) 72'; McCausland (yellow card) 80'	Report	Pereyra 9'; Relvas 15', (yellow card) 45+3'; Mantalos (yellow card) 27'; Pierrot (yellow card) 55'	Stadium: Alphamega Stadium; Attendance: 5,921; Referee: Goga Kikacheishvili (Georgia)

14 August 2025 Second leg	AEK Athens (Greece)	3–1 (a.e.t.) (5–3 agg.)	(Cyprus) Aris Limassol	Athens, Greece
21:00 EEST (UTC+3)	Pineda (yellow card) 44'; Marin 51' (pen.); Kutesa 104'; Jović 110'	Report	Markhiyev (yellow card) 21'; Kvilitaia 62' (pen.); Goldson (yellow card) 79'; Charalampous (yellow card) 110'	Stadium: Agia Sophia Stadium; Attendance: 15,221; Referee: Allard Lindhout (Netherlands)

==== Play-off round ====
21 August 2025 First leg	Anderlecht (Belgium)	1–1	(Greece) AEK Athens	Anderlecht
21:00 EEST (UTC+3)	Llansana (yellow card) 11'; Augustinsson (yellow card) 39'; Dolberg 21'	Report	Relvas (yellow card) 9'; Mantalos (yellow card) 56' (yellow-red card) 90+5'; Eliasson 74'	Stadium: Constant Vanden Stock Stadium; Attendance: 13,466; Referee: Jérôme Brisard (France)

28 August 2025 Second leg	AEK Athens (Greece)	2–0 (3–1 agg.)	(Belgium) Anderlecht	Athens, Greece
21:00 EEST (UTC+3)	Koïta 36'; Kutesa 48'; Rota (yellow card) 59'	Report	Huerta (yellow card) 19'; Dolberg (yellow card) 23'; Angulo (yellow card) 85'; Llansana (yellow card) 90+3'; Augustinsson (yellow card) 90+7'	Stadium: Agia Sophia Stadium; Attendance: 25,891; Referee: Rohit Saggi (Norway)

==== League phase ====
The draw for the league phase pairings was held on 29 August 2025.

Pos	Team	Pld	W	D	L	GF	GA	GD	Pts	Qualification
1	(French Football Federation) Strasbourg	6	5	1	0	11	5	+6	16	Advance to round of 16 (seeded)
2	(Polish Football Association) Raków Częstochowa	6	4	2	0	9	2	+7	14	Advance to round of 16 (seeded)
3	(Hellenic Football Federation) AEK Athens	6	4	1	1	14	7	+7	13	Advance to round of 16 (seeded)
4	(Football Association of the Czech Republic) Sparta Prague	6	4	1	1	10	3	+7	13	Advance to round of 16 (seeded)
5	(Royal Spanish Football Federation) Rayo Vallecano	6	4	1	1	13	7	+6	13	Advance to round of 16 (seeded)

Source: UEFA
Rules for classification: League phase tiebreakers

Round	1	2	3	4	5	6
Ground	A	H	H	A	A	H
Result	L	W	D	W	W	W
Position	27	12	15	10	4	3
Points	0	3	4	7	10	13

Source: UEFA
A = Away; H = Home; W = Win; D = Draw; L = Loss

===== Matches =====
2 October 2025 1	Celje (Slovenia)	3–1	(Greece) AEK Athens	Celje, Slovenia
22:00 EEST (UTC+3)	Kovačević 34', 55', 80', (yellow card) 81'; Hrka (yellow card) 70'; Lisakovich (yellow card) 78'	Report	Kutesa 7'; Strakosha (yellow card) 18'; Marin (yellow card) 53'; Rota (yellow card) 63'; Mantalos (yellow card) 74'	Stadium: Stadion Z'dežele; Attendance: 7,420; Referee: Oleksii Derevinskyi (Ukraine)

23 October 2025 2	AEK Athens (Greece)	6–0	(Scotland) Aberdeen	Athens, Greece
19:45 EEST (UTC+3)	Koïta 11', 18'; Eliasson 27'; Relvas (yellow card) 35'; Marin 55'; Jović 81'; Kutesa 87'	Report	Knoester (yellow card) 59'	Stadium: Agia Sophia Stadium; Attendance: 20,921; Referee: Jasper Vergoote (Netherlands)

6 November 2025 3	AEK Athens (Greece)	1–1	(Republic of Ireland) Shamrock Rovers	Athens, Greece
19:45 EET (UTC+2)	Jović 90' (pen.), (yellow card) 90+8'; Vida (yellow card) 90+8'	Report	Burke 21' (pen.), (yellow card) 24'; Watts (yellow card) 31'; Cleary (yellow card) 48'; Nugent (yellow card) 51'	Stadium: Agia Sophia Stadium; Attendance: 20,210; Referee: José Luis Munuera Montero (Spain)

27 November 2025 4	Fiorentina (Italy)	0–1	(Greece) AEK Athens	Florence, Italy
22:00 EET (UTC+2)	Guðmundsson (yellow card) 44'; Pongračić (yellow card) 69'; Mandragora (yellow card) 90+7'	Report	Gaćinović 35'; Pereyra (yellow card) 63'; Pilios (yellow card) 64'	Stadium: Stadio Artemio Franchi; Attendance: 10,964; Referee: Robert Jones (England)

11 December 2025 5	Samsunspor (Turkey)	1–2	(Greece) AEK Athens	Samsun, Turkey
19:45 EET (UTC+2)	Moukoudi 4' (o.g.); Šatka (yellow card) 33'	Report	Marin (yellow card) 7', (goal) 52'; Mantalos (yellow card) 44'; Pineda (yellow card) 57'; Koïta 63'; Jović (yellow card) 76'	Stadium: Samsun 19 Mayıs Stadium; Attendance: 19,382; Referee: Jérémie Pignard (France)

18 December 2025 6	AEK Athens (Greece)	3–2	(Romania) Universitatea Craiova	Athens, Greece
22:00 EET (UTC+2)	Vida (yellow card) 4', (goal) 65'; Kutesa (yellow card) 82', (goal) 90+8'; Rota (yellow card) 90+12'; Jović 90+15' (pen.)	Report	Baiaram 30', (yellow card) 72'; Cicâldău 59'; Teles (yellow card) 82'; Crețu (yellow card) 90+3'; Isenko (yellow card) 90+4' (red card); Bancu (yellow card) 90+11'	Stadium: Agia Sophia Stadium; Attendance: 26,021; Referee: Giorgi Kruashvili (Georgia)

==== Knockout phase ====
===== Round of 16 =====
The draw for the round of 16 was held on 27 February 2026.

12 March 2026 First leg	Celje (Slovenia)	0–4	(Greece) AEK Athens	Celje, Slovenia
22:00 EEST (UTC+3)	Hrka (yellow card) 30'; Castro (yellow card) 81'	Report	Varga 3'; Koïta 33', (yellow card) 57'; Gaćinović 36'; Moukoudi 49'	Stadium: Stadion Z'dežele; Attendance: 6,020; Referee: Luís Godinho (Portugal)

19 March 2026 Second leg	AEK Athens (Greece)	0–2 (4–2 agg.)	(Slovenia) Celje	Nea Filadelfeia, Greece
19:45 EEST (UTC+3)	Gaćinović (yellow card) 37'	Report	Iosifov 13'; Ćalušić (yellow card) 23'; Požeg 42'	Stadium: Agia Sophia Stadium; Attendance: 26,221; Referee: Simone Sozza (Italy)

===== Quarter-finals =====
9 April 2026 First leg	Rayo Vallecano (Spain)	3–0	(Greece) AEK Athens	Madrid, Spain
19:45 EEST (UTC+3)	Akhomach 2'; López 45+2'; Díaz (yellow card) 65'; Palazón 74' (pen.)	Report	Varga (yellow card) 61'; Relvas (yellow card) 72'; Jović (yellow card) 89'	Stadium: Campo de Fútbol de Vallecas; Attendance: 13,184; Referee: Benoît Bastien (France)

16 April 2026 Second leg	AEK Athens (Greece)	3–1 (3–4 agg.)	(Spain) Rayo Vallecano	Nea Filadelfeia, Greece
22:00 EEST (UTC+3)	Zini 13', 51'; Varga (yellow card) 30'; Marin 36' (pen.); Koïta (yellow card) 90+1'	Report	Akhomach (yellow card) 19'; López (yellow card) 44'; Palazón 60'; Díaz (yellow card) 90+6'	Stadium: Agia Sophia Stadium; Attendance: 31,100; Referee: Espen Eskås (Norway)

== Statistics ==
=== Squad statistics ===
As of 17 May 2026

No.	Pos	Player	Super League		Super League Play-offs		Greek Cup		Conference League		Total	
No.	Pos	Player	Apps	Goals	Apps	Goals	Apps	Goals	Apps	Goals	Apps	Goals
Goalkeepers
1	GK	(Albania) Thomas Strakosha	26	0	4	0	0	0	16	0	46	0
41	GK	(Greece) Marios Balamotis	0	0	0	0	0	0	0	0	0	0
81	GK	(Greece) Angelos Angelopoulos	0	0	0	0	0	0	0	0	0	0
91	GK	(Italy) Alberto Brignoli	0	0	2	0	5	0	0	0	7	0
Defenders
2	DF	(Cameroon) Harold Moukoudi	20	2	5	0	3	0	14	1	42	3
3	DF	(Albania) Stavros Pilios	20	0	4	0	1	0	15	0	40	0
12	DF	(Greece) Lazaros Rota	23	0	6	0	2	0	16	0	47	0
15	DF	(Bulgaria) Martin Georgiev	2	0	0	0	0	0	0	0	2	0
21	DF	(Croatia) Domagoj Vida	12	0	1	0	2	0	5	1	20	1
22	DF	(Peru) Alexander Callens	0	0	0	0	0	0	0	0	0	0
29	DF	(Scotland) James Penrice	16	0	4	0	5	0	8	0	33	0
34	DF	(Greece) Christos Kosidis	0	0	0	0	2	0	0	0	2	0
44	DF	(Portugal) Filipe Relvas	22	1	6	0	3	0	16	2	47	3
Midfielders
4	MF	(Serbia) Marko Grujić	11	1	0	0	4	0	5	0	20	1
6	MF	(Denmark) Jens Jønsson	0	0	0	0	0	0	2	0	2	0
8	MF	(Serbia) Mijat Gaćinović	14	0	2	0	2	0	13	2	31	2
10	MF	(Portugal) João Mário	20	1	6	1	5	1	0	0	31	3
13	MF	(Mexico) Orbelín Pineda	25	4	6	1	3	0	16	0	50	5
17	MF	(Greece) Dimitris Kaloskamis	14	1	0	0	5	2	1	0	20	3
18	MF	(Romania) Răzvan Marin	25	3	6	0	2	0	15	4	48	7
19	MF	(Sweden) Niclas Eliasson	17	0	1	0	3	0	8	2	29	2
20	MF	(Greece) Petros Mantalos	21	3	3	0	3	0	14	0	41	3
23	MF	(Croatia) Robert Ljubičić	15	4	3	0	3	0	7	0	28	4
37	MF	(Argentina) Roberto Pereyra	5	0	5	0	1	1	11	1	22	2
80	MF	(Rwanda) Hakim Sahabo	1	0	0	0	0	0	0	0	1	0
Forwards
7	FW	(Switzerland) Dereck Kutesa	14	0	3	0	3	0	13	5	33	5
9	FW	(Serbia) Luka Jović	24	16	5	1	3	0	11	4	43	21
11	FW	(Mauritania) Aboubakary Koïta	25	2	6	3	5	0	16	5	52	10
25	FW	(Hungary) Barnabás Varga	11	5	6	0	1	0	3	1	21	6
27	FW	(Greece) Zois Karargyris	1	0	0	0	1	0	0	0	2	0
90	FW	(Angola) Zini	12	2	6	1	1	0	9	2	28	5
Left during Summer Transfer Window
26	FW	(France) Anthony Martial	0	0	0	0	0	0	1	0	1	0
Left during Winter Transfer Window
14	FW	(Haiti) Frantzdy Pierrot	9	2	0	0	3	2	9	0	21	4
24	DF	(Greece) Gerasimos Mitoglou	0	0	0	0	0	0	0	0	0	0
28	DF	(England) Moses Odubajo	2	0	0	0	3	0	0	0	5	0
55	DF	(Greece) Konstantinos Chrysopoulos	1	1	0	0	2	0	0	0	3	1
73	MF	(Greece) Christoforos Kolimatsis	0	0	0	0	0	0	0	0	0	0
From U19 Squad
35	DF	(Greece) Stavros Psyropoulos	0	0	0	0	0	0	0	0	0	0

=== Goalscorers ===
As of 17 May 2026
The list is sorted by competition order when total goals are equal, then by position and then by squad number.

Rank	No.	Pos.	Player	Super League	Super League Play-offs	Greek Cup	Conference League	Total
1	9	FW	(Serbia) Luka Jović	16	1	0	4	21
2	11	FW	(Mauritania) Aboubakary Koïta	2	3	0	5	10
3	18	MF	(Romania) Răzvan Marin	3	0	0	4	7
4	25	FW	(Hungary) Barnabás Varga	5	0	0	1	6
5	13	MF	(Mexico) Orbelín Pineda	4	1	0	0	5
5	7	FW	(Switzerland) Dereck Kutesa	0	0	0	5	5
5	90	FW	(Angola) Zini	2	1	0	2	5
7	23	MF	(Croatia) Robert Ljubičić	4	0	0	0	4
7	14	FW	(Haiti) Frantzdy Pierrot	2	0	2	0	4
10	20	MF	(Greece) Petros Mantalos	3	0	0	0	3
10	2	DF	(Cameroon) Harold Moukoudi	2	0	0	1	3
10	17	MF	(Greece) Dimitris Kaloskamis	1	0	2	0	3
10	44	DF	(Portugal) Filipe Relvas	1	0	0	2	3
10	10	MF	(Portugal) João Mário	1	1	1	0	3
14	37	MF	(Argentina) Roberto Pereyra	0	0	1	1	2
14	19	MF	(Sweden) Niclas Eliasson	0	0	0	2	2
14	8	MF	(Serbia) Mijat Gaćinović	0	0	0	2	2
18	55	DF	(Greece) Konstantinos Chrysopoulos	1	0	0	0	1
18	4	MF	(Serbia) Marko Grujić	1	0	0	0	1
18	21	DF	(Croatia) Domagoj Vida	0	0	0	1	1
Own goals				1	1	0	0	0
Totals				49	8	6	30	93

=== Hat-tricks ===
Numbers in superscript represent the goals that the player scored.

Player	Against	Result	Date	Competition	Source
(Serbia) Luka Jović	(Greece) Panathinaikos	3–2 (A)	30 November 2025	Super League Greece	
(Serbia) Luka Jović^{4}	(Greece) Panathinaikos	4–0 (H)	18 January 2026	Super League Greece	

=== Assists ===
As of 17 May 2026
The list is sorted by competition order when total assists are equal, then by position and then by squad number.

Rank	No.	Pos.	Player	Super League	Super League Play-offs	Greek Cup	Conference League	Total
1	18	MF	(Romania) Răzvan Marin	6	0	0	2	8
1	12	DF	(Greece) Lazaros Rota	5	1	0	2	8
3	20	MF	(Greece) Petros Mantalos	4	0	0	2	6
4	23	MF	(Croatia) Robert Ljubičić	4	0	0	1	5
4	19	FW	(Sweden) Niclas Eliasson	3	0	0	2	5
6	3	DF	(Albania) Stavros Pilios	2	0	0	2	4
6	13	MF	(Mexico) Orbelín Pineda	1	1	0	2	4
6	7	FW	(Switzerland) Dereck Kutesa	1	1	0	2	4
9	25	FW	(Hungary) Barnabás Varga	2	0	0	0	2
9	10	MF	(Portugal) João Mário	1	0	1	0	2
9	17	MF	(Greece) Dimitris Kaloskamis	0	0	2	0	2
12	11	FW	(Mauritania) Aboubakary Koïta	1	0	0	0	1
12	14	FW	(Haiti) Frantzdy Pierrot	1	0	0	0	1
12	29	DF	(Scotland) James Penrice	0	0	1	0	1
12	37	MF	(Argentina) Roberto Pereyra	0	0	1	0	1
12	8	MF	(Serbia) Mijat Gaćinović	0	0	0	1	1
12	9	FW	(Serbia) Luka Jović	0	0	0	1	1
Totals				31	3	5	17	56

=== Clean sheets ===
As of 17 May 2026
The list is sorted by competition order when total clean sheets are equal and then by squad number. Clean sheets in games where both goalkeepers participated are awarded to the goalkeeper who started the game. Goalkeepers with no appearances are not included.

Rank	No.	Player	Super League	Super League Play-offs	Greek Cup	Conference League	Total
1	1	(Albania) Thomas Strakosha	15	3	0	6	24
2	91	(Italy) Alberto Brignoli	0	0	3	0	3
Totals			15	3	3	6	27

=== Disciplinary record ===
As of 17 May 2026

N	P	Nat.	Name	Super League			Super League Play-offs			Greek Cup			Conference League			Total			Notes
N	P	Nat.	Name	Yellow card	Second yellow card	Red card	Yellow card	Second yellow card	Red card	Yellow card	Second yellow card	Red card	Yellow card	Second yellow card	Red card	Yellow card	Second yellow card	Red card	Notes
Goalkeepers
1	GK	(Albania)	Thomas Strakosha	2			1						1			4			
41	GK	(Greece)	Marios Balamotis																
81	GK	(Greece)	Angelos Angelopoulos																
91	GK	(Italy)	Alberto Brignoli																
Defenders
2	DF	(Cameroon)	Harold Moukoudi	3		1	2									5		1	
3	DF	(Albania)	Stavros Pilios	4			1						2			7			
12	DF	(Greece)	Lazaros Rota	6			1						3			10			
15	DF	(Bulgaria)	Martin Georgiev				1									1			
21	DF	(Croatia)	Domagoj Vida	3			1			1			2			7			
22	DF	(Peru)	Alexander Callens																
29	DF	(Scotland)	James Penrice	6			1									7			
34	DF	(Greece)	Christos Kosidis																
44	DF	(Portugal)	Filipe Relvas	5		1	2			1			4			12		1	
Midfielders
4	MF	(Serbia)	Marko Grujić	1												1			
6	MF	(Denmark)	Jens Jønsson																
8	MF	(Serbia)	Mijat Gaćinović	4									2			6			
10	MF	(Portugal)	João Mário	1			1									2			
13	MF	(Mexico)	Orbelín Pineda	5			1			1			3			10			
17	MF	(Greece)	Dimitris Kaloskamis							1						1			
18	MF	(Romania)	Răzvan Marin	3	1		1						2			6	1		
19	MF	(Sweden)	Niclas Eliasson	1												1			
20	MF	(Greece)	Petros Mantalos	4						1			3	1		8	1		
23	MF	(Croatia)	Robert Ljubičić	2									1			3			
37	MF	(Argentina)	Roberto Pereyra				1						2			3			
80	MF	(Rwanda)	Hakim Sahabo																
Forwards
7	FW	(Switzerland)	Dereck Kutesa	2									1			3			
9	FW	(Serbia)	Luka Jović	4			1			2			3			10			
11	FW	(Mauritania)	Aboubakary Koïta	5			1						3			9			
25	FW	(Hungary)	Barnabás Varga	2									2			4			
27	FW	(Greece)	Zois Karargyris																
90	FW	(Angola)	Zini	1												1			
Left during Summer Transfer Window
26	FW	(France)	Anthony Martial																
Left during Winter Transfer Window
14	FW	(Haiti)	Frantzdy Pierrot	2									1			3			
24	DF	(Greece)	Gerasimos Mitoglou																
28	DF	(England)	Moses Odubajo							2						2			
55	DF	(Greece)	Konstantinos Chrysopoulos																
73	MF	(Greece)	Christoforos Kolimatsis																
From U19 Squad
35	DF	(Greece)	Stavros Psyropoulos																

=== Starting 11 ===
This section presents the most frequently used formation along with the players with the most starts across all competitions.

N.	Formation	Matchday(s)
31	4–4–2	1, 4, 5, 11, 16–26
18	4–2–3–1	2, 3, 6–10, 12–15
4	4–4–2 (D)

No.	Nat.	Player	Pos.
1	(Albania)	Thomas Strakosha	GK
2	(Cameroon)	Harold Moukoudi	RCB
44	(Portugal)	Filipe Relvas	LCB
12	(Greece)	Lazaros Rota	RB
3	(Albania)	Stavros Pilios	LB
13	(Mexico)	Orbelín Pineda	RCM
18	(Romania)	Răzvan Marin	LCM
11	(Mauritania)	Aboubakary Koïta	RM
20	(Greece)	Petros Mantalos (C)	LM
25	(Hungary)	Varga	RCF
9	(Serbia)	Luka Jović	LCF

Last updated: 2026-02-22

== Awards ==
Player	Pos.	Award	Source
(Romania) Răzvan Marin	MF	UECL Goal of the Week (5th Matchday)	
(Romania) Răzvan Marin	MF	UECL Goal of the League Phase	
(Serbia) Luka Jović	FW	Stoiximan Best Goal (18th Matchday)	
(Greece) Petros Mantalos	MF	Stoiximan Best Goal (22nd Matchday)	
(Portugal) Filipe Relvas	DF	Stoiximan Best Goal (23rd Matchday)	
(Romania) Răzvan Marin	MF	Stoiximan Player of the Month (February)	
(Serbia) Luka Jović	FW	Stoiximan Best Goal (25th Matchday)	
(Hungary) Barnabás Varga	FW	Stoiximan Best Goal (26th Matchday)	
(Serbia) Luka Jović	FW	Stoiximan Player of the Month (March)	
(Mexico) Orbelín Pineda	MF	Stoiximan Best Goal Playoffs (1st & 2nd Matchday)	
(Mauritania) Aboubakary Koïta	FW	Stoiximan Player of the Month (April)	
(Angola) Zini	FW	Stoiximan Best Goal Playoffs (3rd & 4th Matchday)	
(Serbia) Luka Jović	FW	Stoiximan Best Goal Playoffs (5th & 6th Matchday)	
(Mexico) Orbelín Pineda	MF	Stoiximan Player of the Club	
(Mexico) Orbelín Pineda	MF	Stoiximan Player of the Season	
(Mexico) Orbelín Pineda	MF	Stoiximan Goal of the Season	
(Mexico) Orbelín Pineda	MF	Foreign Player of the Season	
(Albania) Thomas Strakosha	GK	Goalkeeper of the Season	
(Serbia) Marko Nikolić	—	Manager of the Season	
(Albania) Thomas Strakosha	GK	Team of the Season	
(Portugal) Filipe Relvas	DF	Team of the Season	
(Greece) Lazaros Rota	DF	Team of the Season	
(Mexico) Orbelín Pineda	MF	Team of the Season	
(Romania) Răzvan Marin	MF	Team of the Season	
(Serbia) Luka Jović	FW	Team of the Season	
