= Zini =

Zini may refer to:

- Zini, a lemur in the 2000 Disney animated film Dinosaur
- Zeyni, a village in Baqeran Rural District, Iran
- Zini (footballer), Angolan footballer
- Guo Yuan (Zini), courtesy name Zini, Chinese politician
- David Zini, Israeli military officer
