= Zanussi (disambiguation) =

Zanussi can refer to the following:

- Zanussi, a home appliance company
- Zanussi (balloon), 1978 trans-Atlantic balloon attempt
- Zanussi (surname), an Italian surname
