= Hakim Sahabo =

Rwandan footballer (born 2005)

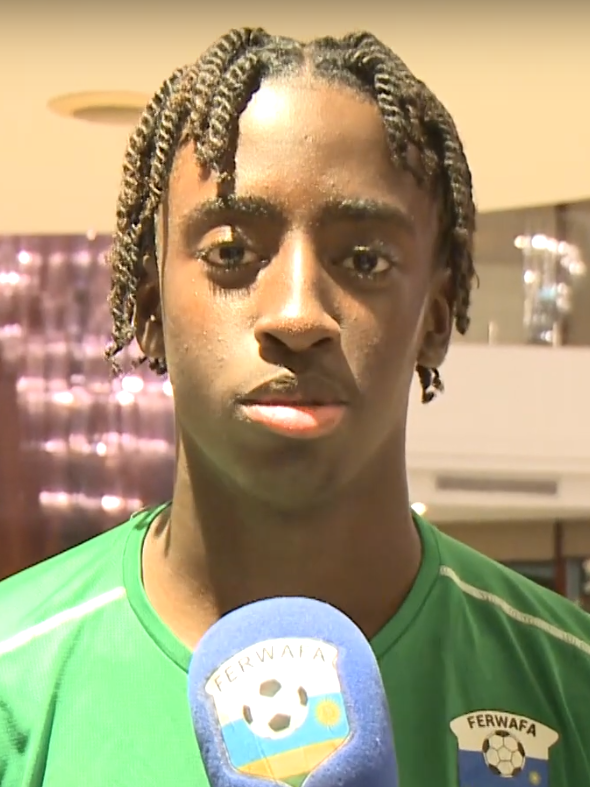
- Sahabo in 2022

Personal information
- Date of birth: 16 June 2005 (age 21)
- Place of birth: Brussels, Belgium
- Height: 1.83 m (6 ft 0 in)
- Position: Midfielder

Team information
- Current team: AEK Athens
- Number: 80

Youth career
- Willebroek-Meerhof
- Beerschot
- Anderlecht
- Genk
- 2020–2021: Mechelen
- 2021–2022: Lille

Senior career*
| Years | Team | Apps | (Gls) |
| 2022–2023 | Lille II | 7 | (0) |
| 2023–2025 | SL16 | 24 | (0) |
| 2024–2026 | Standard Liège | 32 | (0) |
| 2025 | → Beerschot (loan) | 15 | (1) |
| 2026– | AEK Athens | 1 | (0) |

International career^{‡}
| 2022– | Rwanda | 13 | (1) |
Medal record
Representing Rwanda
Men's football
FIFA Series
| Winner | 2026 Rwanda |
- * Club domestic league appearances and goals as of 22:00, 22 March 2026 (UTC) ‡ National team caps and goals as of 21:00, 27 March 2026 (UTC)

Hakim Sahabo (born 16 June 2005) is a professional footballer who plays as a midfielder for Super League Greece club AEK Athens. Born in Belgium, he represents the Rwanda national team.

== Club career ==
Sahabo is a youth product of Willebroek-Meerhof, Beerschot, Anderlecht, Genk, Mechelen, and Lille. He began his senior career with Lille's reserves in 2022.

On 29 June 2023, Sahabo signed a three-year contract with Standard Liège. He was initially assigned to their reserves squad SL16.

On 9 January 2025, Sahabo moved on a half-season loan to Beerschot.

On 2 February 2026, Sahabo signed with Greek club AEK Athens.

== International career ==
Sahabo was born in Belgium to a Burundian father and a Rwandan mother, he was eligible to represent Belgium, Burundi or the Rwanda national team. He chose to represent Rwanda through his maternal heritage. On 17 November 2022, he made his debut for Rwanda in a friendly match against Sudan, which ended in a 0–0 draw.

On 27 March 2026, he scored his first international goal in a 2026 FIFA Series match against Grenada, helping Rwanda secure a 4–0 victory.

== Career statistics ==
=== Club ===
As of 2 February 2026

Appearances and goals by club, season and competition
| Club | Season | League | | | National cup (Note: Includes Belgian Cup) | | Continental | | Other | | Total | |
| Club | Season | Division | Apps | Goals | Apps | Goals | Apps | Goals | Apps | Goals | Apps | Goals |
|---|---|---|---|---|---|---|---|---|---|---|---|---|
| Lille II | 2021–22 | Championnat National 3 | 7 | 0 | 0 | 0 | – | | – | | 7 | 0 |
| SL16 FC | 2023–24 | Challenger Pro League | 14 | 0 | 0 | 0 | – | | – | | 14 | 0 |
| SL16 FC | 2024–25 | Belgian Division 1 | 8 | 0 | 0 | 0 | – | | – | | 8 | 0 |
| SL16 FC | 2025–26 | Belgian Division 1 | 2 | 0 | 0 | 0 | – | | – | | 2 | 0 |
| SL16 FC | Total | | 24 | 0 | 0 | 0 | 0 | 0 | 0 | 0 | 24 | 0 |
| Standard Liège | 2023–24 | Belgian Pro League | 9 | 0 | 0 | 0 | – | | 9 (Note: Appearances in Belgian Pro League European Playoffs) | 0 | 18 | 0 |
| Standard Liège | 2025–26 | Belgian Pro League | 14 | 0 | 2 | 0 | – | | – | | 16 | 0 |
| Standard Liège | Total | | 23 | 0 | 2 | 0 | 0 | 0 | 9 | 0 | 34 | 0 |
| Beerschot (loan) | 2024–25 | Belgian Pro League | 9 | 0 | 0 | 0 | – | | 6 (Note: Appearances in Belgian Pro League Relegation Playouts) | 0 | 15 | 0 |
| AEK Athens | 2025–26 | Super League Greece | 0 | 0 | 0 | 0 | 0 | 0 | 0 | 0 | 0 | 0 |
| Career total | | | 63 | 0 | 2 | 0 | 0 | 0 | 15 | 0 | 80 | 0 |

=== International ===
Scores and results list Rwanda's goal tally first.

| No. | Date | Venue | Opponent | Score | Result | Competition |
|---|---|---|---|---|---|---|
| 1. | 27 March 2026 | Amahoro Stadium, Kigali, Rwanda | Grenada | 4–0 | 4–0 | 2026 FIFA Series |

== Honours ==
Rwanda

- FIFA Series: 2026

AEK Athens

- Super League Greece: 2025–26
