= Dimitris Kaloskamis =

Greek footballer (born 2005)

Personal information
- Full name: Dimitrios Kaloskamis
- Date of birth: 1 March 2005 (age 21)
- Place of birth: Athens, Greece
- Height: 1.85 m (6 ft 1 in)
- Position: Attacking midfielder

Team information
- Current team: AEK Athens
- Number: 17

Youth career
- Arsenal Soccer School Greece
- 2016–2023: Panathinaikos

Senior career*
Years	Team	Apps	(Gls)
2023–2024	Panathinaikos B	12	(1)
2024–2025	Atromitos	20	(3)
2025–	AEK Athens	14	(1)

International career^{‡}
2021–2022	Greece U17	10	(4)
2023–2024	Greece U19	12	(3)
2024–	Greece U21	14	(1)
- * Club domestic league appearances and goals as of 24 January 2026 ‡ National team caps and goals as of 26 September 2026

Dimitris Kaloskamis (Greek: Δημήτρης Καλοσκάμης; born 1 March 2005) is a Greek professional footballer who plays as an attacking midfielder for Super League club AEK Athens.

== Club career ==
Kaloskamis first started playing football at an Arsenal soccer school in Chalandri, before trialing with Panathinaikos, Olympiacos and AEK Athens, eventually deciding to sign for the former in 2016. He signed his first professional contract in July 2021.

In September 2022, he was named by English newspaper The Guardian as one of the best players born in 2005 worldwide.

On 17 June 2025, Kaloskamis signed for AEK Athens on a five-year contract until 2030. On 24 September 2025, he scored his first goal for the club in a cup game against Panetolikos. His first goal in the league came in a 3–2 comeback win against A.E. Kifisia on 5 October 2025.

== Career statistics ==
As of 13 March 2026

Club	Season	League			Greek Cup		Europe		Total	
Club	Season	Division	Apps	Goals	Apps	Goals	Apps	Goals	Apps	Goals
Panathinaikos B	2023–24	Super League Greece 2	12	1	—		—		12	1
Atromitos	2024–25	Super League Greece	20	3	3	0	—		23	3
AEK Athens	2025–26	Super League Greece	14	1	5	2	1 (Note: Appearance in UEFA Conference League)	0	20	3
Career total			44	4	8	2	1	0	55	6

== Honours ==
AEK Athens

- Super League Greece: 2025–26
