= Zanussi (surname) =

Zanussi is a surname of Italian origin. Notable people with surname include:

- Joe Zanussi (born 1947), Canadian retired professional ice hockey player
- Krzysztof Zanussi (born 1939), Polish film and theatre director, producer and screenwriter
- Lino Zanussi (1920–1968), Italian businessman and appliance manufacturer
- Per Zanussi (born 1977), Italian–Norwegian jazz musician (upright bass) and composer
- Ron Zanussi (born 1956), Canadian retired professional Hockey right winger
- Stefania Zanussi (born 1965), Italian basketball player

== See also ==
- Zani (disambiguation)
- Zanotti
