= James Penrice =

Scottish footballer (born 1998)

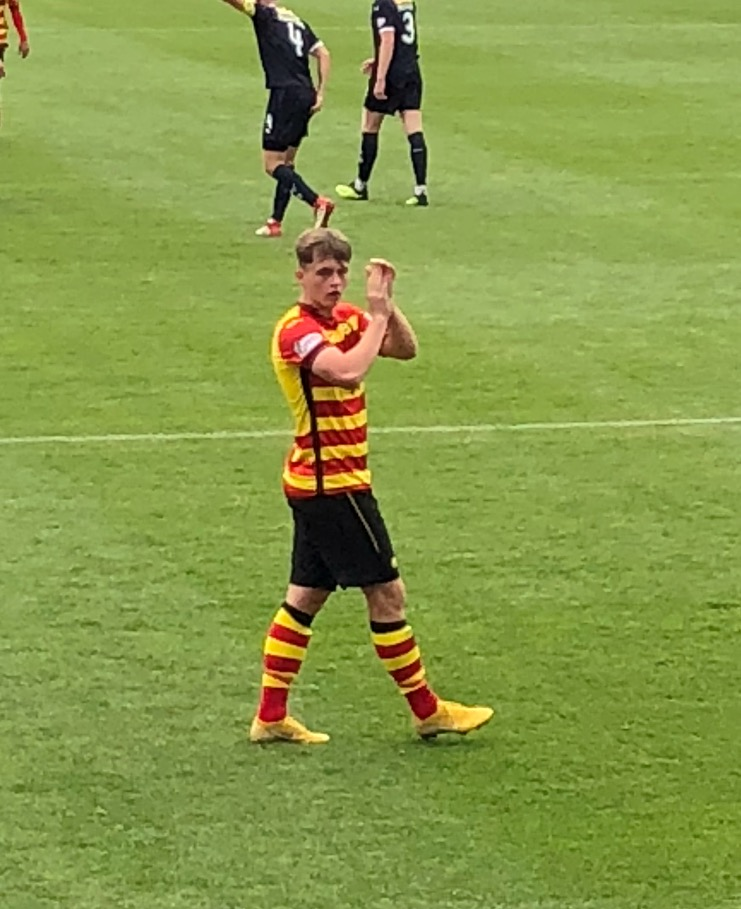
- Penrice with Partick Thistle in 2018

Personal information
- Full name: James Regan Penrice
- Date of birth: 22 December 1998 (age 27)
- Place of birth: Livingston, West Lothian, Scotland
- Height: 1.77 m (5 ft 10 in)
- Position: Left-back

Team information
- Current team: Rangers (on loan from AEK Athens)
- Number: 29

Youth career
- Partick Thistle

Senior career*
Years	Team	Apps	(Gls)
2015–2021	Partick Thistle	84	(1)
2016–2017	→ East Fife (loan)	18	(2)
2017–2018	→ Livingston (loan)	13	(1)
2021–2024	Livingston	77	(3)
2024–2025	Heart of Midlothian	33	(2)
2025–	AEK Athens	19	(0)
2026–	→ Rangers (loan)	9	(0)
- * Club domestic league appearances and goals as of 03 November 2026

James Regan Penrice (born 22 December 1998) is a Scottish professional footballer, who went to Deans Community High School in Livingston & who plays as a left-back for Scottish Premiership club Rangers, on loan from Super League Greece side AEK Athens.

He has previously played for Partick Thistle, Livingston, East Fife and Heart of Midlothian.

== Career ==
=== Partick Thistle ===
After progressing through the club's Thistle Weir Academy, Penrice made his senior debut in a 3–3 draw between Partick Thistle and Dundee United in which he was credited with an assist. He then made his home debut in a 2–2 draw with Hamilton Academical on the last day of the 2015–16 season, winning the man of the match award.

Penrice joined Scottish League One side East Fife on loan in December 2016, until the end of the season. The following summer Penrice was then loaned to Livingston in August 2017 until January. After returning, he signed a contract with Thistle until 2020. Penrice scored his first goal for Thistle in a 2–1 win over Greenock Morton, in the League Cup. He scored his first league goal for Thistle in a 2–1 win over Falkirk. Penrice played every minute of the 2018–19 season for Thistle, becoming the first player to achieve that feat since 2006.

Penrice scored his first goal of the 2019–20 season in a 2–0 win over Welsh side Connah's Quay Nomads in the Scottish Challenge Cup. In January 2020, he signed a new one-year contract extension with Thistle until the summer of 2021. After the 2019–20 season was ended early due to the Coronavirus pandemic, Partick Thistle were relegated for the second time in three seasons, now being relegated to League One. Penrice chose to stay at Thistle following their relegation making him and teammate Stuart Bannigan, the only two players left at the club from their time in the Premiership.

Following winning the Scottish League One title with Thistle, Penrice left the club at the expiry of his contract to move to Premiership side Livingston, in a 'technical' swap deal with Scott Tiffoney heading in the other direction also on a free transfer.

=== Livingston ===
Penrice returned to Livingston on a permanent basis in June 2021.

=== Heart of Midlothian ===
On 18 June 2024, Heart of Midlothian announced that Penrice had signed for the club with a three-year deal, taking the number 29 ahead of the 2024–25 Scottish Premiership season.

Penrice's debut season for Hearts saw him win both the club's Player of the Year Awards. He was also named in the 2024-25 PFA Scotland Team of the Year.

=== AEK Athens ===
On 5 July 2025, Penrice signed for Super League Greece side AEK Athens for a £2 million transfer fee.

=== Rangers ===
On 15 August 2026, Penrice signed for Scottish Premiership club Rangers on loan, with an option to buy. He scored on his debut against St Mirren on 16 August 2026 in a 5-1 victory.

== Career statistics ==
As of match played 31 October 2026

Appearances and goals by club, season and competition
Club	Season	League			National cup (Note: Includes Scottish Cup, Greek Football Cup)		League cup (Note: Includes Scottish League Cup)		Europe		Other		Total	
Club	Season	Division	Apps	Goals	Apps	Goals	Apps	Goals	Apps	Goals	Apps	Goals	Apps	Goals
Partick Thistle	2015–16	Scottish Premiership	2	0	0	0	0	0	—		—		2	0
Partick Thistle	2016–17	Scottish Premiership	0	0	—		0	0	—		—		0	0
Partick Thistle	2017–18	Scottish Premiership	2	0	0	0	2	0	—		0	0	4	0
Partick Thistle	2018–19	Scottish Championship	36	1	4	0	5	1	—		2 (Note: Appearances in Scottish Challenge Cup)	0	47	2
Partick Thistle	2019–20	Scottish Championship	26	0	2	0	5	0	—		4	1	37	1
Partick Thistle	2020–21	Scottish League One	18	0	2	0	4	0	—		—		24	0
Partick Thistle	Total		84	1	8	0	16	2	—		6	1	114	3
Partick Thistle U-20s	2016–17	SPFL Development League	—		—		—		—		2	1	2	1
Partick Thistle U-20s	2017–18	SPFL Development League	—		—		—		—		2	0	2	0
Partick Thistle U-20s	Total		—		—		—		—		4	1	4	1
East Fife (loan)	2016–17	Scottish League One	18	0	2	0	—		—		—		20	0
Livingston (loan)	2017–18	Scottish Championship	13	1	1	0	0	0	—		0	0	14	1
Livingston	2021–22	Scottish Premiership	26	0	1	0	5	0	—		—		31	0
Livingston	2022–23	Scottish Premiership	29	3	2	0	2	0	—		—		34	3
Livingston	2023–24	Scottish Premiership	22	0	1	0	6	0	—		—		29	0
Livingston	Total		77	3	4	0	13	0	—		—		94	3
Heart of Midlothian	2024–25	Scottish Premiership	33	2	4	0	1	0	8 (Note: Two appearances in UEFA Europa League, six appearances in UEFA Conference League)	0	—		46	2
AEK Athens	2025–26	Super League Greece	19	0	5	0	—		8 (Note: Appearances in UEFA Conference League)	0	—		32	0
Rangers	2026–27	Scottish Premiership	9	0	0	0	3	1	2	0	—		14	1
Career total			248	5	24	0	31	3	16	0	10	2	329	1

== Honours ==
Partick Thistle

- Scottish League One: 2020–21

AEK Athens

- Super League Greece: 2025–26

Individual

- Heart of Midlothian Player of the Year: 2024–25
- PFA Scotland Team of the Year (Premiership): 2024–25
