= Filipe Relvas =

Portuguese footballer

Personal information
- Full name: Filipe do Bem Relvas Vitó Oliveira
- Date of birth: 20 September 1999 (age 27)
- Place of birth: Espinho, Portugal
- Height: 1.92 m (6 ft 4 in)
- Position: Defender

Team information
- Current team: AEK Athens
- Number: 44

Youth career
- 2007–2009: Espinho
- 2009–2013: Feirense
- 2013–2014: Espinho
- 2014–2015: Feirense
- 2015–2018: Espinho

Senior career*
Years	Team	Apps	(Gls)
2018–2019	Gondomar	0	(0)
2019–2020	Pedras Rubras	25	(1)
2020–2025	Portimonense	106	(2)
2025	Vitória Guimarães	11	(0)
2025–	AEK Athens	37	(2)
- * Club domestic league appearances and goals as of 23:47, 15 November 2026 (UTC)

Filipe do Bem Relvas Vitó Oliveira (born 20 September 1999), known as Relvas, is a Portuguese professional footballer who plays as a central defender or a left-back for Super League Greece club AEK Athens.

== Club career ==
Relvas was born in Espinho, Aveiro District. He played youth football with S.C. Espinho and C.D. Feirense, and made his senior debut in the lower leagues with Gondomar S.C. and F.C. Pedras Rubras.

In the summer of 2020, Relvas moved straight to the Primeira Liga after joining Portimonense SC, being initially assigned to the under-23 team. After signing a professional contract on 29 July 2021, he made his competitive debut for the main squad on 1 August, featuring the entire 2–0 away loss against Boavista F.C. in the second round of the Taça da Liga. His maiden league appearance took place one week later, when he also started the 1–0 win at Vitória de Guimarães.

Relvas scored his first goal in the Portuguese top division on 17 December 2023, but in a 5–2 defeat away to Moreirense FC. On the last day of the January 2025 transfer window, he agreed to a three-and-a-half-year deal at Guimarães.

On 28 June 2025, Relvas signed with Super League Greece club AEK Athens F.C. for €3 million. He scored on his debut on 24 July, being decisive to a 1–0 victory over Hapoel Be'er Sheva F.C. in the second qualifying round of the UEFA Conference League. His second came in the first leg of the competition's next stage, when he put his team ahead 2–0 in an eventual 2–2 draw at Aris Limassol FC.

== Career statistics ==
As of match played 17 May 2026

Club	Season	League			National cup (Note: Includes Taça de Portugal, Greek Football Cup)		League cup (Note: Includes Taça da Liga)		Europe		Total	
Club	Season	Division	Apps	Goals	Apps	Goals	Apps	Goals	Apps	Goals	Apps	Goals
Portimonense	2020–21	Primeira Liga	0	0	0	0	0	0	—		0	0
Portimonense	2021–22	Primeira Liga	24	0	3	0	1	0	—		28	0
Portimonense	2022–23	Primeira Liga	33	0	1	0	3	0	—		37	0
Portimonense	2023–24	Primeira Liga	32	2	2	1	2	0	—		36	3
Portimonense	2024–25	Liga Portugal 2	17	0	1	0	—		—		18	0
Portimonense	Total		106	2	7	1	6	0	—		119	3
Vitória Guimarães	2024–25	Primeira Liga	11	0	—		—		—		11	0
AEK Athens	2025–26	Super League Greece	28	1	3	0	—		16 (Note: Appearances in UEFA Conference League)	2	47	3
Career total			145	3	10	1	6	0	16	2	177	6

== Honours ==
AEK Athens

- Super League Greece: 2025–26

Individual

- Super League Greece Team of the Season: 2025–26
