= Andrews Tetteh =

Greek footballer (born 2001)

- Tetteh with Greece in 2026

Personal information
- Date of birth: 25 May 2001 (age 25)
- Place of birth: Athens, Greece
- Height: 1.88 m (6 ft 2 in)
- Position: Forward

Team information
- Current team: Panathinaikos
- Number: 7

Youth career
- 2007–2013: Atlas Kypseli
- 2013–2016: Koronida Galatsi
- 2016–2019: PAO Rouf

Senior career*
Years	Team	Apps	(Gls)
2018–2020	PAO Rouf	46	(14)
2020–2026	A.E. Kifisia	123	(39)
2025	→ Panetolikos (loan)	13	(2)
2026–	Panathinaikos	25	(10)

International career^{‡}
2025–	Greece	9	(0)
- * Club domestic league appearances and goals as of 14 November 2026 ‡ National team caps and goals as of 2 October 2026

Andrews Tetteh (Greek: Ανδρέας Τετέι, romanized: Andreas Tetei; born 25 May 2001) is a Greek professional footballer who plays as a forward for Super League club Panathinaikos and the Greece national team.

== Club career ==
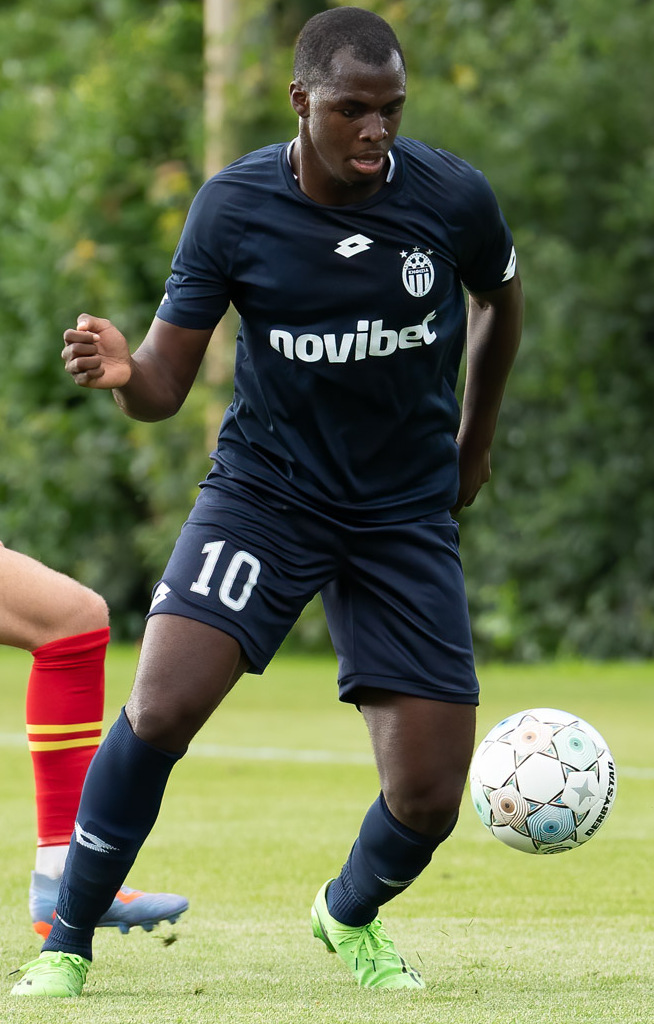
Tetteh playing for A.E. Kifisia in 2023

On 15 October 2025, Panathinaikos purchased Tetteh and teammate Pavlos Pantelidis for an eventual transfer in summer 2026, with an option to move in January 2026.

== International career ==
Tetteh was born and raised in Greece to a Sierra Leonean mother and Ghanaian father and holds Greek citizenship. He was called up to the Greece national team for a set of 2026 FIFA World Cup qualification matches in November 2025. He earned his first international cap for Greece against Scotland on 15 November 15, 2025, coming on for Vangelis Pavlidis and getting an assist.

== Career statistics ==
=== Club ===
As of match played 8 November 2026

Club	Season	League			Greek Cup		Europe		Other		Total	
Club	Season	Division	Apps	Goals	Apps	Goals	Apps	Goals	Apps	Goals	Apps	Goals
PAO Rouf	2017–18	A' Athens FCA	3	0	—		—		0	0	3	0
PAO Rouf	2018–19	A' Athens FCA	23	5	—		—		1 (Note: Appearance in Athens FCA Cup)	0	24	5
PAO Rouf	2019–20	A' Athens FCA	20	9	—		—		1	0	21	9
PAO Rouf	Total		46	14	—		—		2	0	48	14
A.E. Kifisia	2020–21	Gamma Ethniki	9	3	—		—		5 (Note: Four appearances and four goals in Gamma Ethniki promotion play-offs, one appearance in Athens FCA Cup)	4	14	7
A.E. Kifisia	2021–22	Super League Greece 2	31	11	4	2	—		—		35	13
A.E. Kifisia	2022–23	Super League Greece 2	24	12	5	1	—		—		29	13
A.E. Kifisia	2023–24	Super League Greece	30	1	3	0	—		—		33	1
A.E. Kifisia	2024–25	Super League Greece 2	15	8	3	0	—		—		18	8
A.E. Kifisia	2025–26	Super League Greece	14	4	2	2	—		—		16	6
A.E. Kifisia	Total		123	39	17	5	—		5	4	135	48
Panetolikos (loan)	2024–25	Super League Greece	13	2	0	0	—		—		13	2
Panathinaikos	2025–26	Super League Greece	14	5	3	0	4 (Note: Appearances in UEFA Europa League)	3	—		21	8
Panathinaikos	2026–27	Super League Greece	10	5	1	0	7 (Note: Appearances in UEFA Conference League)	2	—		18	7
Panathinaikos	Total		24	10	4	0	11	5	0	0	39	15
Career total			207	65	21	5	11	5	7	4	246	79

=== International ===
As of match played 1 October 2026

Appearances and goals by national team and year
National team	Year	Apps	Goals
Greece	2025	2	0
Greece	2026	7	0
Total		9	0

== Honours ==
P.A.O. Rouf

- A' Athens FCA: 2019–20

A.E. Kifisia

- Super League Greece 2: 2022–23
- Gamma Ethniki: 2020–21

Individual

- Super League Greece 2, Group B, Young Player of the Year: 2021–22
