= Lazaros Rota =

Greek footballer (born 1997)

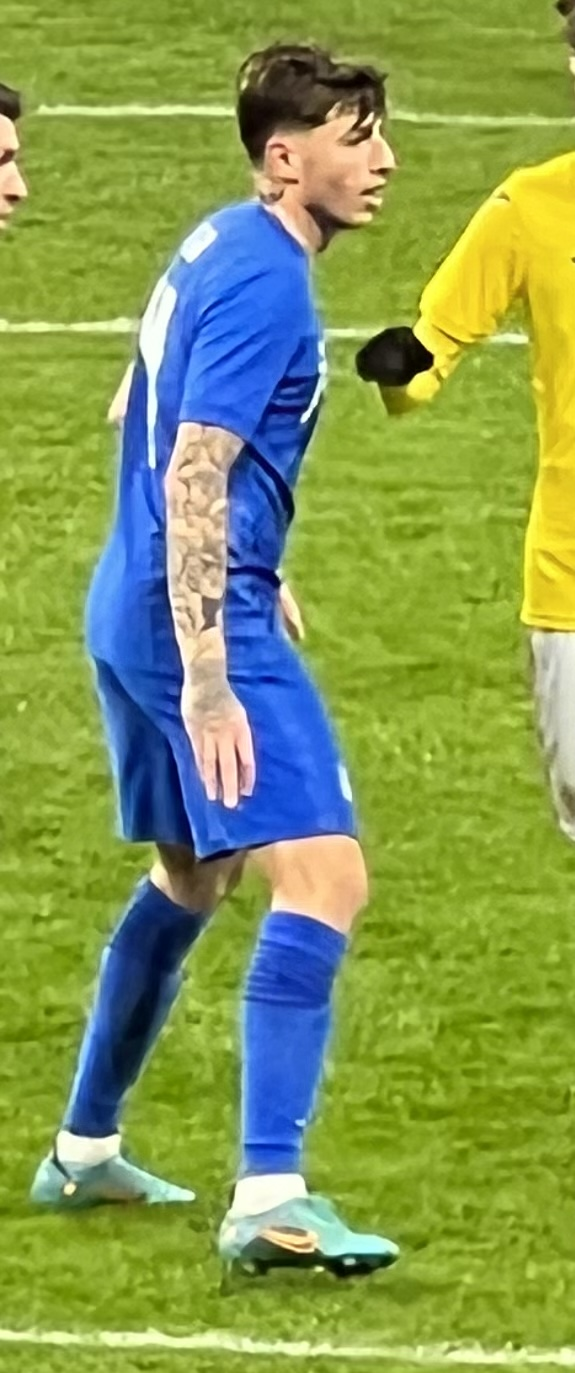
- Rota playing for Greece in 2022

Personal information
- Date of birth: 23 August 1997 (age 29)
- Place of birth: Katerini, Greece
- Height: 1.80 m (5 ft 11 in)
- Position: Right-back

Team information
- Current team: AEK Athens
- Number: 12

Youth career
- –2017: Iraklis

Senior career*
Years	Team	Apps	(Gls)
2017–2018	Slavoj Trebišov	12	(1)
2018–2020	Zemplín Michalovce	40	(2)
2020–2021	Fortuna Sittard	31	(0)
2021–	AEK Athens	133	(4)

International career^{‡}
2020–	Greece	29	(0)
- * Club domestic league appearances and goals as of 13 September 2026 ‡ National team caps and goals as of 7 June 2026

Lazaros Rota (Greek: Λάζαρος Ρότα; born 23 August 1997) is a Greek professional footballer who plays as a right-back for Super League club AEK Athens and the Greece national team.

== Club career ==
Rota started his career in ΑΜΣ Πανοράματος, in Panorama Thessaloniki. Later on he played in Santos FC Panorama. Then he went to Aris. They did not use him. Rota started his career with the second team of Iraklis Reserves. He continued in FK Slavoj Trebišov, a 2. Liga (Slovakia) club until he signed a professional contract with Zemplín Michalovce.

=== Zemplín Michalovce ===
Rota made his professional Fortuna Liga debut for Zemplín Michalovce against DAC Dunajská Streda on 29 July 2018. He played the entirety of the 4–1 defeat away at the MOL Aréna.

=== Fortuna Sittard ===
Rota's move to Fortuna Sittard was announced on 31 January 2020. He signed a 3.5-year contract with the Dutch club. On 31 August, the Dutch club announced that the two sides had reached a mutual consensus to terminate the contract.

=== AEK Athens ===
On 2 September 2021, AEK Athens announced the acquisition of Rota, for the next three years for an undisclosed fee. On 10 April, he scored an equaliser, which was later voted the best goal of matchday 28, against Aris. The following week he scored in Ioannina against the local team. His goal was again voted the best of the specific matchday.

== International career ==
Rota was eligible to play for the Albania national team due to having ethnic Albanian parents, and the Greece national team. In August 2020, Rota had called up to Greece national team for the UEFA Nations League against Slovenia and Kosovo. He made his debut on 11 October 2020 in a Nations League game against Moldova.

== Career statistics ==
=== Club ===
As of 11 September 2025

Appearances and goals by club, season and competition
Club	Season	League			National cup (Note: Includes Slovak Cup, KNVB Cup, Greek Football Cup)		Europe		Total	
Club	Season	Division	Apps	Goals	Apps	Goals	Apps	Goals	Apps	Goals
Slavoj Trebišov	2017–18	2. Liga	12	1	0	0	—		12	1
Zemplín Michalovce	2018–19	Slovak First Football League	26	1	7	1	—		33	2
Zemplín Michalovce	2019–20	Slovak First Football League	14	1	1	0	—		15	1
Zemplín Michalovce	Total		40	2	8	1	0	0	48	3
Fortuna Sittard	2019–20	Eredivisie	5	0	—		—		5	0
Fortuna Sittard	2020–21	Eredivisie	24	0	2	0	—		26	0
Fortuna Sittard	2021–22	Eredivisie	2	0	—		—		2	0
Fortuna Sittard	Total		31	0	2	0	0	0	33	0
AEK Athens	2021–22	Super League Greece	23	2	4	0	—		27	2
AEK Athens	2022–23	Super League Greece	31	0	5	0	—		36	0
AEK Athens	2023–24	Super League Greece	22	2	1	0	5 (Note: Two appearances in UEFA Champions League, three appearances in UEFA Europa League)	0	28	2
AEK Athens	2024–25	Super League Greece	24	0	5	0	4 (Note: Appearances in UEFA Conference League)	0	33	0
AEK Athens	2025–26	Super League Greece	2	0	0	0	6	0	8	0
AEK Athens	Total		102	4	15	0	15	0	132	4
Career total			186	7	25	1	15	0	226	8

== Honours ==
AEK Athens

- Super League Greece: 2022–23, 2025–26
- Greek Cup: 2022–23
