= Zani i Ri =

- Language: Albanian

Zani i Ri (New Voice) was a fortnightly newspaper published in Albania from August 1920 by Osman Myderrizi, a member of the first Parliament of Albania and the 1924–1925 Constitutional Convention. It was the first newspaper to be published in Tirana after it had been made capital of Albania.
