= Kart Zani =

Kart Zani كرت زني
- Village
- Location within Iran
- Coordinates: 26°42′06″N 57°34′36″E
- Country: Iran
- Province: Hormozgan
- County: Minab
- Bakhsh: Senderk
- Rural District: Dar Pahn

Population (2006)
  - Total: 148
- Time zone: UTC+3:30 (IRST)
  - Summer (DST): UTC+4:30 (IRDT)

Kart Zani (Persian: كرت زني, also Romanized as Kart Zanī; also known as Kūrt Zanī) is a village in Dar Pahn Rural District, Senderk District, Minab County, Hormozgan Province, Iran. At the 2006 census, its population was 148, in 29 families.
