= Zeyni =

Zeyni زيني
- Village
- Location within Iran
- Coordinates: 32°49′57″N 59°05′42″E
- Country: Iran
- Province: South Khorasan
- County: Birjand
- Bakhsh: Central
- Rural District: Baqeran

Population (2006)
  - Total: 124
- Time zone: UTC+3:30 (IRST)
  - Summer (DST): UTC+4:30 (IRDT)

Zeyni (Persian: زيني, also Romanized as Zeynī and Zīnī; also known as Zani, Zeini Olya, and Zeni) is a village in Baqeran Rural District, in the Central District of Birjand County, South Khorasan Province, Iran. At the 2006 census, its population was 124, in 38 families.
