= Facundo Pérez =

Argentine footballer

Facundo 'Paloma' Pérez
Personal information
- Full name: Facundo Martín Pérez
- Date of birth: 31 July 1999 (age 27)
- Place of birth: Villa Fiorito, Argentina
- Height: 1.70 m (5 ft 7 in)
- Position: Midfielder

Team information
- Current team: APOEL
- Number: 99

Youth career
- Lanús

Senior career*
Years	Team	Apps	(Gls)
2020–2026	Lanús	88	(3)
2023–2025	→ Panetolikos (loan)	61	(3)
2025–2026	→ AEL Larissas (loan)	33	(4)
2026–	APOEL	2	(1)
- * Club domestic league appearances and goals as of 8 September 2026

Facundo Martín Pérez (born 31 July 1999) is an Argentine professional footballer who plays as a midfielder for Cypriot First Division club APOEL.

== Career ==
Pérez signed his first professional contract with Lanús in June 2019. He made his professional debut for Lanús in a 2–0 Argentine Primera División win over Godoy Cruz on 2 February 2020.

=== Greece ===
He subsequently moved to Greece, joining Panetolikos on loan, where he played from 2023 to 2025. He then joined AEL Larissas on loan, playing for the club from 2025 to 2026.

=== APOEL ===
On 11 August 2026, Pérez joined APOEL after the Cypriot club reached an agreement with Lanús for his transfer.
