= Zini (footballer) =

Angolan footballer (born 2002)

Personal information
- Full name: Ambrosini António Cabaça Salvador
- Date of birth: 3 July 2002 (age 24)
- Place of birth: Cazenga, Luanda, Angola
- Height: 1.81 m (5 ft 11 in)
- Position: Forward

Team information
- Current team: AEK Athens
- Number: 90

Youth career
- 2020: 1º de Agosto

Senior career*
Years	Team	Apps	(Gls)
2020–2023	1º de Agosto	22	(12)
2023	→ AEK Athens B (loan)	3	(0)
2023–2024	AEK Athens B	12	(3)
2023–	AEK Athens	36	(5)
2024–2025	→ Levadiakos (loan)	29	(14)

International career^{‡}
2019	Angola U17	4	(2)
2022-2022	Angola U23	1	(2)
2021–	Angola	34	(9)
- * Club domestic league appearances and goals as of 21:00, 20 September 2026 (UTC) ‡ National team caps and goals as of 5 June 2026

Ambrosini António Cabaça Salvador (born 3 July 2002), known professionally as Zini or sometimes Zine, is an Angolan professional footballer who plays as a forward for Greek Super League club AEK Athens and the Angola national team.

== Club career ==
=== AEK Athens ===
On 3 January 2023, Zini joined AEK Athens B on a six-month loan with an option to buy. Roughly a month later, on 16 February, AEK exercised the buy-out option and Zini signed a contract until the summer of 2028. For the rest of the season he was used in both first and second team matches. At the end of the season he won the domestic double with AEK Athens. On 30 November 2023, he scored his first goal with the second team, in the home match against Kampaniakos.

==== Loan to Levadiakos ====
On 11 September 2024, Zini was loaned to Levadiakos for the 2024–25 season. During the season, he appeared in 30 games with the club and scored 14 goals, being the top scorer of the club.

== International career ==
In December 2023, Zini was named in the Angola's squad for the 2023 Africa Cup of Nations. However, he was ruled out of the 2025 Africa Cup of Nations with an injury and replaced by Agostinho Calunga.

== Career statistics ==
=== Club ===
As of match played 8 September 2026

Appearances and goals by club, season and competition
Club	Season	League			National cup (Note: Includes Greek Football Cup)		Continental		Other		Total	
Club	Season	Division	Apps	Goals	Apps	Goals	Apps	Goals	Apps	Goals	Apps	Goals
1º de Agosto	2020–21	Girabola	22	12	0	0	3 (Note: Appearances in CAF Champions League)	1	—		25	13
AEK Athens B	2022–23	Super League Greece 2	8	0	—		—		—		8	0
AEK Athens B	2023–24	Super League Greece 2	7	3	—		—		—		7	3
AEK Athens B	Total		15	3	—		—		—		15	3
AEK Athens	2022–23	Super League Greece	2	0	—		—		—		2	0
AEK Athens	2023–24	Super League Greece	11	0	0	0	0	0	—		11	0
AEK Athens	2025–26	Super League Greece	18	3	1	0	9 (Note: Appearances in UEFA Conference League)	2	—		28	5
AEK Athens	2026–27	Super League Greece	3	2	1	1	3 (Note: Appearances in UEFA Champions League)	0	1 (Note: Appearance in Greek Super Cup)	1	7	4
AEK Athens	Total		34	5	2	1	12	2	1	1	49	9
Levadiakos (loan)	2024–25	Super League Greece	29	14	1	0	—		—		30	14
Career total			100	34	3	1	15	3	1	1	119	39

=== International ===
As of matches played 5 June 2026

Appearances and goals by national team and year
National team	Year	Apps	Goals
Angola	2021	5	2
Angola	2022	5	2
Angola	2023	4	0
Angola	2024	10	3
Angola	2025	9	2
Angola	2026	1	0
Total		34	9

Scores and results list Angola's goal tally first, score column indicates score after each Zini goal.

List of international goals scored by Zini
No.	Date	Venue	Opponent	Score	Result	Competition
1	8 October 2021	Estádio 11 de Novembro, Talatona, Angola	Gabon	1–0	3–1	2026 FIFA World Cup qualifying
2	16 November 2021	28 March Stadium, Benghazi, Libya	Libya	1–1	1–1	2026 FIFA World Cup qualifying
3	26 March 2022	Estádio Municipal, Rio Maior, Portugal	Guinea-Bissau	2–1	3–2	Friendly
4	20 November 2022	Mbombela Stadium, Mbombela, South Africa	South Africa	1–0	1–1	Friendly
5	23 January 2024	Charles Konan Banny Stadium, Yamoussoukro, Ivory Coast	Burkina Faso	2–0	2–0	2023 Africa Cup of Nations
6	15 October 2024	Larbi Zaouli Stadium, Casablanca, Morocco	Niger	1–0	1–0	2025 Africa Cup of Nations qualification
7	15 November 2024	Estádio 11 de Novembro, Talatona, Angola	Ghana	1–1	1–1	2025 Africa Cup of Nations qualification
8	13 June 2025	Free State Stadium, Bloemfontein, South Africa	Madagascar	3–0	4–1	2025 COSAFA Cup
9	9 September 2025	Estádio 11 de Novembro, Talatona, Angola	Mauritius	3–1	3–1	2026 FIFA World Cup qualification

== Honours ==
AEK Athens

- Super League Greece: 2022–23, 2025–26
- Greek Cup: 2022–23

Angola

- COSAFA Cup: 2025

Individual

- Puto do Girabola: 2021–22
