= 2025–26 Super League Greece =

90th season of top-tier football league in Greece

Super League 1
- Season: 2025–26
- Dates: 23 August 2025 – 21 May 2026
- Champions: AEK Athens; 3rd Super League Greece title 14th Greek title
- Relegated: AEL; Panserraikos
- Champions League: AEK Athens; Olympiacos
- Europa League: OFI (as Cup winners); PAOK
- Conference League: Panathinaikos
- Matches: 236
- Goals: 606 (2.57 per match)
- Best player: Orbelin Pineda
- Top goalscorer: Ayoub El Kaabi (18 goals)
- Biggest home win: Levadiakos 6–0 Panetolikos (5 October 2025); Atromitos 6–0 Panserraikos (21 May 2026)
- Biggest away win: Panserraikos 0–5 PAOK (2 November 2025); Panetolikos 0–5 AEK Athens (14 December 2025)
- Highest scoring: AEL 2–5 Volos (4 October 2025); Levadiakos 5–2 Panserraikos (9 November 2025); Levadiakos 5–2 Volos (3 May 2026)
- Longest winning run: Olympiacos (7 matches)
- Longest unbeaten run: AEK Athens (24 matches)
- Longest winless run: AEL (15 matches)
- Longest losing run: Panserraikos (10 matches)
- Highest attendance: 32,954; Olympiacos 0–1 Panathinaikos (8 February 2026)
- Lowest attendance: 134; Volos 0–3 Atromitos (19 January 2026)
- Total attendance: 1,753,400
- Average attendance: 7,690

The 2025–26 Super League Greece, also known as Stoiximan Super League for sponsorship reasons, was the 90th season of the Super League Greece, the professional association football league in Greece and the highest level of the Greek football league system under the supervision of the HFF established in 1927. The season also marked the 67th championship since the establishment of the 1st National Division in 1959. Olympiacos were the defending champions having won their 48th title last season. Puma was the official match ball supplier for a second consecutive year.

The 2025–26 season began on 23 August 2025. The winter break began on 22 December 2025, while the regular season concluded on 22 March 2026. The Championship and UEFA Conference League spot play-offs as well as the Relegation play-outs began on 4 April 2026. The league concluded with the last match day of the Relegation Play-Outs on 21 May 2026.

Thiat was the first full season where semi-automated offside technology was in use, following its introduction during the previous season in the Championship play-offs round. Super League clubs unanimously agreed to its use for the next 4 championships, starting from this season.

The draw for the fixtures took place on Wednesday 9 July 2025 in Alimos and the full regular season schedule was released shortly after.

AEK Athens secured the 14th title in their history on 10 May 2026, after defeating Panathinaikos by 2–1, at home in the fourth matchday of the Championship play-offs, thus sealing their first title after the 2022–23 season.

== Teams ==
Fourteen teams competed in the league – the top twelve teams from the previous season and two teams promoted from Super League 2. AEL returned in the Super League, having secured promotion from Super League 2, after a four-year absence and the 2020–21 season. A.E. Kifisia returned in the Super League after one year absence and the 2023–2024 season, after winning the Super League 2 championship. Lamia were relegated to Super League 2 for the first time, after 8 consecutive years playing in the top division and 2017–18 season, their debut season in the highest division of Greek football. Athens Kallithea were relegated to Super League 2 after only one year in the Super League.

Promoted from 2024–25 Super League Greece 2	Relegated from 2024–25 Super League Greece 1
AEL; A.E. Kifisia	Athens Kallithea; Lamia

=== Format ===
The championship was held in two phases, same as last year's, namely the regular season (phase 1) and then the Championship play-offs with the top 4 teams, the play-offs for the UEFA Conference League qualifying rounds between the teams ranked 5 through 8 and the Relegation play-outs round with the bottom 6 teams (phase 2). In the regular season 26 matches were played in 2 rounds of 13 match days each, where in each round all teams competed against all others based on a draw.

=== Stadiums and locations ===
Locations of the 2025–26 Super League Greece 1 teams

Note: The table is listed in alphabetical order.

Team	Location	Stadium	Capacity	2024–25
AEK Athens	Athens (Nea Filadelfeia)	Agia Sophia Stadium	32,500	4th
A.E. Kifisia	Piraeus (Nikaia)	Neapoli Stadium	5,500	1st (South Group SL2)
AEL	Larissa	AEL FC Arena	16,118	1st (North Group SL2)
Aris	Thessaloniki (Charilaou)	Kleanthis Vikelidis Stadium	22,800	5th
Asteras Tripolis	Tripoli	Theodoros Kolokotronis Stadium	7,423	6th
Atromitos	Athens (Peristeri)	Peristeri Stadium	9,050	7th
Levadiakos	Livadeia	Levadia Municipal Stadium	5,915	9th
OFI	Heraklion	Pankritio Stadium	26,240	8th
Olympiacos	Piraeus	Karaiskakis Stadium	33,334	1st
Panathinaikos	Athens (Ampelokipoi)	Leoforos Alexandras Stadium	16,003	2nd
Panetolikos	Agrinio	Panetolikos Stadium	7,321	10th
Panserraikos	Serres	Serres Municipal Stadium	9,500	12th
PAOK	Thessaloniki (Toumba)	Toumba Stadium	28,703	3rd
Volos	Volos	Panthessaliko Stadium	22,700	11th

=== Personnel, kits and TV channel ===
Team	Manager	Captain	Kit manufacturer	Shirt sponsor (chest)	Shirt sponsor (sleeve)	Broadcast Channel
AEK Athens	(Serbia) Marko Nikolić	(Greece) Petros Mantalos	(United States) Nike	(Greece) Pame Stoixima	(Greece) Piraeus Bank	Cosmote TV
A.E. Kifisia	(Argentina) Sebastián Leto	(Spain) Alberto Botía	(Germany) Erima	(Greece) Elite Strom	(Greece) Dimcom	Cosmote TV
AEL	(Italy) Gianluca Festa	(Greece) Thanasis Papageorgiou	(Italy) Macron	(Greece) Novibet	(Greece) Avance	Cosmote TV
Aris	(Greece) Michalis Grigoriou	(Brazil) Fabiano Leismann	(Italy) Kappa	(Greece) Novibet	(Greece) Miraval	Nova Sports
Asteras Tripolis	(Greece) Georgios Antonopoulos	(Greece) Nikos Kaltsas	(Italy) Macron	(Greece) Aktor	(Greece) Volton	Nova Sports
Atromitos	(Bosnia and Herzegovina) Dušan Kerkez	(Greece) Lefteris Choutesiotis	(United States) Capelli	(Greece) Novibet	(Greece) Xmoto	Nova Sports
Levadiakos	(Greece) Nikos Papadopoulos	(Greece) Panagiotis Liagas	(Italy) Erreà	(Romania) Superbet	(Greece) Avance	Nova Sports
OFI	(Greece) Christos Kontis	(Greece) Vasilios Lampropoulos	(Germany) Puma	(Sweden) Betsson	(Greece) Zaros	Cosmote TV
Olympiacos	(Spain) José Luis Mendilibar	(Greece) Panagiotis Retsos	(Germany) Adidas	(Greece) Stoiximan	(Greece) Shopflix.gr	Cosmote TV
Panathinaikos	(Spain) Rafael Benítez	(Greece) Anastasios Bakasetas	(Germany) Adidas	(Romania) Superbet	(Greece) Piraeus Bank	Cosmote TV
Panetolikos	(Greece) Giannis Anastasiou	(Greece) Christos Belevonis	(Italy) Erreà	(Greece) Novibet	(Greece) Avance	Cosmote TV
Panserraikos	(Spain) Gerard Zaragoza	(Slovakia) Vernon De Marco	(Italy) Erreà	(Greece) Novibet	(Greece) Avance	Nova Sports
PAOK	(Romania) Răzvan Lucescu	(Greece) Dimitrios Pelkas	(Italy) Macron	(Romania) Superbet	N/A	Nova Sports
Volos	(Greece) Kostas Bratsos	(Greece) Tasos Tsokanis	(England) Admiral	(Greece) Novibet	N/A	Cosmote TV

=== Managerial changes ===
Team	Outgoing manager	Manner of departure	Date of vacancy	Position in table	Incoming manager	Date of appointment
AEL	(Greece) Alekos Vosniadis	End of contract	11 May 2025	Pre-season	(Greece) Giorgos Petrakis	15 May 2025
AEK Athens	(Argentina) Matías Almeyda	Sacked	13 May 2025	Pre-season	(Serbia) Marko Nikolić	14 June 2025
Panserraikos	(Spain) Juan Ferrando	Sacked	27 May 2025	Pre-season	(Italy) Cristiano Bacci	4 June 2025
Volos	(Greece) Kostas Georgiadis	End of contract	30 May 2025	Pre-season	(Spain) Juan Ferrando	11 June 2025
Atromitos	(Uruguay) Pablo García	Sacked	10 June 2025	Pre-season	(Greece) Leonidas Vokolos	30 June 2025
Aris	(Greece) Marinos Ouzounidis	Sacked	30 August 2025	8th	(Spain) Manolo Jiménez	9 September 2025
Panathinaikos	(Portugal) Rui Vitória	Sacked	14 September 2025	12th	(Greece) Christos Kontis (caretaker)	16 September 2025
Asteras Tripolis	(Greece) Savvas Pantelidis	Sacked	5 October 2025	14th	(Wales) Chris Coleman	8 October 2025
AEL	(Greece) Giorgos Petrakis	Sacked	5 October 2025	12th	(Greece) Stelios Malezas	7 October 2025
Panetolikos	(Greece) Giannis Petrakis	Sacked	6 October 2025	13th	(Greece) Giannis Anastasiou	7 October 2025
Panathinaikos	(Greece) Christos Kontis (caretaker)	End of tenure as caretaker	23 October 2025	7th	(Spain) Rafael Benítez	24 October 2025
OFI	(Serbia) Milan Rastavac	Sacked	25 October 2025	12th	(Greece) Christos Kontis	27 October 2025
Panserraikos	(Italy) Cristiano Bacci	Sacked	2 November 2025	13th	(Greece) Alexandros Vergonis (caretaker)	8 November 2025
Atromitos	(Greece) Leonidas Vokolos	Sacked	9 November 2025	10th	(Bosnia and Herzegovina) Dušan Kerkez	15 November 2025
Panserraikos	(Greece) Alexandros Vergonis (caretaker)	End of tenure as caretaker	14 November 2025	14th	(Spain) Gerard Zaragoza	15 November 2025
AEL	(Greece) Stelios Malezas	Sacked	7 December 2025	13th	(Greece) Savvas Pantelidis	8 December 2025
Asteras Tripolis	(Wales) Chris Coleman	Sacked	14 January 2026	11th	(Serbia) Milan Rastavac	14 January 2026
Volos	(Spain) Juan Ferrando	Sacked	8 February 2026	7th	(Greece) Kostas Bratsos	10 February 2026
Aris	(Spain) Manolo Jiménez	Sacked	22 February 2026	6th	(Greece) Michalis Grigoriou	26 February 2026
Asteras Tripolis	(Serbia) Milan Rastavac	Sacked	2 March 2026	13th	(Greece) Giorgos Antonopoulos (caretaker)	3 March 2026
AEL	(Greece) Savvas Pantelidis	Sacked	22 April 2026	13th	(Italy) Gianluca Festa	23 April 2026

== League table ==
Pos	Team	Pld	W	D	L	GF	GA	GD	Pts	Qualification or relegation
1	AEK Athens	26	18	6	2	49	17	+32	60	Qualification for the Championship play-offs
2	Olympiacos	26	17	7	2	45	11	+34	58	Qualification for the Championship play-offs
3	PAOK	26	17	6	3	52	17	+35	57	Qualification for the Championship play-offs
4	Panathinaikos	26	14	7	5	44	26	+18	49	Qualification for the Championship play-offs
5	Levadiakos	26	12	6	8	51	37	+14	42	Qualification for the Europe play-offs
6	OFI	26	10	2	14	34	45	−11	32	Qualification for the Europe play-offs
7	Volos	26	9	4	13	26	38	−12	31	Qualification for the Europe play-offs
8	Aris	26	6	12	8	20	27	−7	30	Qualification for the Europe play-offs
9	Atromitos	26	7	8	11	26	30	−4	29	Qualification for the Relegation play-outs
10	A.E. Kifisia	26	6	9	11	32	42	−10	27	Qualification for the Relegation play-outs
11	Panetolikos	26	7	5	14	24	38	−14	26	Qualification for the Relegation play-outs
12	AEL	26	4	11	11	22	39	−17	23	Qualification for the Relegation play-outs
13	Panserraikos	26	4	5	17	16	55	−39	17	Qualification for the Relegation play-outs
14	Asteras Tripolis	26	3	8	15	22	41	−19	17	Qualification for the Relegation play-outs

Source: Super League Greece
Rules for classification: 1) Points; 2) Head-to-head points; 3) Head-to-head goal difference; 4) Overall goal difference; 5) Goals scored; 6) Total wins; 7) Away goals scored; 8) Away wins.

== Results ==
Home \ Away	AEK	KIF	AEL	ARIS	AST	ATR	LEV	OFI	OLY	PAO	PNE	PNS	PAOK	VOL
AEK Athens	—	3–0	1–0	1–0	1–0	4–1	4–0	2–1	1–1	4–0	1–0	2–0	0–2	1–0
A.E. Kifisia	2–3	—	1–1	0–1	0–0	0–1	1–0	2–2	1–3	3–2	1–1	3–0	1–4	2–0
AEL	1–1	1–1	—	1–0	1–1	0–0	0–2	1–2	0–2	2–2	1–4	1–0	1–1	2–5
Aris	1–1	1–1	2–1	—	0–0	0–0	2–2	0–2	0–0	1–1	0–2	1–1	0–0	2–0
Asteras Tripolis	0–1	2–2	2–2	0–1	—	1–2	1–1	3–0	0–3	1–2	1–1	0–1	3–3	2–0
Atromitos	2–2	1–2	1–1	1–2	0–1	—	2–2	1–2	0–2	0–0	1–0	2–2	2–0	0–1
Levadiakos	0–1	3–2	3–0	1–1	3–1	1–0	—	4–0	0–0	1–4	6–0	5–2	2–3	3–1
OFI	0–1	1–3	3–0	3–0	4–0	1–3	3–2	—	0–3	0–2	1–0	3–0	1–2	0–1
Olympiacos	2–0	1–1	0–0	2–1	2–0	3–0	3–2	3–0	—	0–1	2–0	5–0	0–0	1–0
Panathinaikos	2–3	3–0	1–1	3–1	2–0	1–0	1–1	4–1	1–1	—	0–0	3–0	2–1	2–1
Panetolikos	0–5	2–1	3–0	0–1	3–1	0–2	1–3	4–2	0–1	1–2	—	0–0	0–3	1–2
Panserraikos	0–4	2–1	0–2	0–0	2–1	1–1	0–2	0–1	1–2	0–3	0–1	—	0–5	2–1
PAOK	0–0	3–0	1–0	3–1	2–0	1–0	3–0	3–0	2–1	2–0	0–0	4–1	—	3–0
Volos	2–2	1–1	0–2	1–1	2–1	0–3	1–2	1–1	0–2	1–0	1–0	2–1	2–1	—

Source: Super League Greece
Legend: Blue = home team win; Yellow = draw; Red = away team win.

== Positions by round ==
The table lists the positions of teams after each week of matches. To preserve chronological evolvements, any postponed matches are not included in the round at which they were originally scheduled, but added to the full round they were played immediately afterwards. For example, if a match is scheduled for round 13, but then postponed and played between rounds 16 and 17, it will be added to the standings for round 16. Juridical decisions regarding a match are also added to the full round after which they were ruled.

Team ╲ Round	1	2	3	4	5	6	7	8	9	10	11	12	13	14	15	16	17	18	19	20	21	22	23	24	25	26
AEK Athens	2	2	2	2	2	1	3	3	3	3	3	3	3	2	1	3	2	1	1	1	1	1	3	1	3	1
Olympiacos	4	1	1	1	1	3	2	2	2	1	1	1	1	1	2	1	3	2	3	2	2	2	2	3	2	2
PAOK	6	3	3	3	3	2	1	1	1	2	2	2	2	3	3	2	1	3	2	3	3	3	1	2	1	3
Panathinaikos	8	9	12	12	8	7	7	5	6	6	5	6	6	5	6	5	5	5	5	5	5	5	4	4	4	4
Levadiakos	5	4	5	5	5	4	5	4	4	4	4	4	4	4	4	4	4	4	4	4	4	4	5	5	5	5
OFI	7	6	8	11	12	9	11	12	14	13	11	12	12	12	12	9	10	9	8	8	8	8	6	7	8	6
Volos	12	14	10	6	7	6	4	7	5	5	6	5	5	6	5	6	6	6	7	7	7	7	9	9	9	7
Aris	3	8	4	4	4	5	6	6	8	7	7	7	7	8	7	7	7	7	6	6	6	6	7	6	6	8
Atromitos	1	5	7	7	9	10	10	8	9	10	10	11	11	11	11	12	9	10	11	9	9	9	8	8	7	9
A.E. Kifisia	9	10	6	8	6	8	8	9	7	8	8	8	8	7	8	8	8	8	9	10	11	10	10	11	10	10
Panetolikos	13	7	9	9	11	13	9	10	10	9	9	9	9	9	9	10	11	12	12	12	10	12	11	10	11	11
AEL	10	11	11	10	10	12	13	11	11	12	13	13	13	13	13	13	13	11	10	11	12	11	12	12	12	12
Panserraikos	14	13	14	14	14	11	12	13	13	14	14	14	14	14	14	14	14	14	14	14	14	14	14	14	14	13
Asteras Tripolis	11	12	13	13	13	14	14	14	12	11	12	10	10	10	10	11	12	13	13	13	13	13	13	13	13	14

Leader and Championship play-offs
Championship play-offs
Europe play-offs (Note: If Domestic Cup winner finishes in place 1-4)
Relegation play-outs

Source: Super League Greece

== Championship play-offs ==
The top four teams from the regular season met twice (6 matches per team) for places in the 2026–27 UEFA Champions League, 2026–27 UEFA Europa League and 2026–27 UEFA Conference League as well as deciding the League Champion. Points and goals were carried over in full from the regular season.

Pos	Team	Pld	W	D	L	GF	GA	GD	Pts	Qualification
1	AEK Athens (C)	32	21	9	2	57	20	+37	72	Qualification for the Champions League play-off round
2	Olympiacos	32	19	9	4	51	17	+34	66	Qualification for the Champions League third qualifying round (Note: Olympiacos, as one of the two clubs with the highest club coefficient that would otherwise have entered the League Path second qualifying round, will enter the League Path third qualifying round, due to the rebalancing of the default access list.)
3	PAOK	32	18	10	4	59	25	+34	64	Qualification for the Europa League second qualifying round
4	Panathinaikos	32	14	10	8	47	33	+14	52	Qualification for the Conference League second qualifying round

Source: Super League Greece
Rules for classification: 1) Points; 2) Head-to-head points (Regular season and play-off); 3) Head-to-head goal difference (Regular season and play-off); 4) Regular season position.
(C) Champions

=== Results ===
Home \ Away	AEK	OLY	PAOK	PAO
AEK Athens	—	1–1	3–0	2–1
Olympiacos	0–1	—	1–1	1–0
PAOK	1–1	3–1	—	0–0
Panathinaikos	0–0	0–2	2–2	—

Source: Super League Greece
Legend: Blue = home team win; Yellow = draw; Red = away team win.

=== Positions by round ===
Team ╲ Round	27	28	29	30	31	32
AEK Athens	1	1	1	1	1	1
Olympiacos	3	2	3	3	2	2
PAOK	2	3	2	2	3	3
Panathinaikos	4	4	4	4	4	4

Champions and Champions League play-off round
Champions League second qualifying round
Europa League second qualifying round
Conference League second qualifying round

Source: Super League Greece

== Europe play-offs ==
The teams ranked 5 through 8 from the regular season participated in the Europe play-offs to determine the last available spot for 2026–27 UEFA Conference League, which was to be awarded to the 5th placed team only if the 2025–26 Greek Cup winner finished in the top 4. Since OFI won the 2025–26 Greek Cup, it received a ticket for next year's Europa League. The fourth place in the league qualifies for next year's Conference League, therefore the European play-off process was no longer relevant. The teams met twice (6 matches per team) and entered this round with half the points they earned during the regular season.

Pos	Team	Pld	W	D	L	GF	GA	GD	Pts	Qualification
5	Aris	32	11	13	8	34	32	+2	31 (Note: Aris finished ahead of Levadiakos on head-to-head points: Aris 6, Levadiakos 3.)	
6	Levadiakos	32	15	7	10	63	47	+16	31	
7	OFI	32	12	3	17	43	55	−12	23	Qualification for the Europa League play-off round (Note: OFI qualified for the Europa League play-off round as 2025–26 Greek Cup winners.)
8	Volos	32	9	5	18	33	55	−22	17	

Source: Super League Greece
Rules for classification: 1) Points; 2) Head-to-head points (Regular season and play-off); 3) Head-to-head goal difference (Regular season and play-off); 4) Regular season position.

=== Results ===
Home \ Away	LEV	OFI	ARIS	VOL
Levadiakos	—	3–2	1–1	5–2
OFI	2–0	—	0–2	3–1
Aris	3–0	3–1	—	3–2
Volos	0–3	1–1	1–2	—

Source: Super League Greece
Legend: Blue = home team win; Yellow = draw; Red = away team win.

=== Positions by round ===
Team ╲ Round	27	28	29	30	31	32
Aris	8	7	6	6	6	5
Levadiakos	5	5	5	5	5	6
OFI	7	6	7	7	7	7
Volos	6	8	8	8	8	8

Source: Super League Greece

== Relegation play-outs ==
The teams ranked 9 through 14 from the regular season participated in the Relegation play-outs. They met twice (10 matches per team) to determine the last 2 teams that were relegated to 2026–27 Super League 2.

Pos	Team	Pld	W	D	L	GF	GA	GD	Pts	Qualification
9	Atromitos	36	12	10	14	49	42	+7	46	
10	A.E. Kifisia	36	9	14	13	40	51	−11	41	
11	Asteras Tripolis	36	8	12	16	36	49	−13	36	
12	Panetolikos	36	9	9	18	35	51	−16	36	
13	AEL (R)	36	5	15	16	34	56	−22	30	Relegation to Super League 2
14	Panserraikos (R)	36	7	8	21	25	73	−48	29	Relegation to Super League 2

Source: Super League Greece
Rules for classification: 1) Points; 2) Head-to-head points (Regular season and play-out); 3) Head-to-head goal difference (Regular season and play-out); 4) Regular season position.
(R) Relegated

=== Results ===
Home \ Away	ATR	PNE	KIF	AST	AEL	PNS
Atromitos	—	1–2	0–0	2–1	3–2	6–0
Panetolikos	1–1	—	0–1	1–2	1–1	2–3
A.E. Kifisia	0–3	0–0	—	0–0	3–2	1–2
Asteras Tripolis	4–2	2–1	0–0	—	3–1	1–0
AEL	2–1	1–2	1–1	1–1	—	0–1
Panserraikos	0–4	1–1	1–2	0–0	1–1	—

Source: Super League Greece
Legend: Blue = home team win; Yellow = draw; Red = away team win.

=== Positions by round ===
Team ╲ Round	27	28	29	30	31	32	33	34	35	36
Atromitos	9	9	9	9	9	9	9	9	9	9
A.E. Kifisia	11	11	11	11	11	10	10	10	10	10
Asteras Tripolis	14	14	14	12	13	13	12	12	12	11
Panetolikos	10	10	10	10	10	11	11	11	11	12
AEL	12	12	13	13	14	14	14	14	13	13
Panserraikos	13	13	12	14	12	12	13	13	14	14

Relegation to 2026–27 Super League 2

Source: Super League Greece

== Season statistics ==
As of 21 May 2026

=== Top scorers ===
Rank	Player	Club	Goals
1	(Morocco) Ayoub El Kaabi	Olympiacos	18
2	(Serbia) Luka Jović	AEK Athens	17
3	(Argentina) Fabricio Pedrozo	Levadiakos	13
4	(Argentina) Julián Bartolo	Asteras Tripolis	12
5	(Slovenia) Alen Ožbolt	Levadiakos	11
6	(Iran) Mehdi Taremi	Olympiacos	10
6	(Italy) Eddie Salcedo	OFI	10
6	(Spain) Jorge Pombo	A.E. Kifisia	10
6	(Germany) Makana Baku	Atromitos	10
10	(Greece) Taxiarchis Fountas	OFI	9

=== Clean sheets ===
Rank	Player	Club	Clean sheets
1	(Greece) Konstantinos Tzolakis	Olympiacos	19
2	(Albania) Thomas Strakosha	AEK Athens	18
3	(Greece) Antonis Tsiftsis	PAOK	8
3	(Czech Republic) Jiří Pavlenka	PAOK	8
3	(Ivory Coast) Alban Lafont	Panathinaikos	8
3	(Ecuador) Moisés Ramírez	A.E. Kifisia	8
7	(Greece) Nikos Papadopoulos	Asteras Tripolis	7
7	(Greece) Georgios Athanasiadis	Aris	7
7	(Greece) Nikos Christogeorgos	OFI	7
10	(Greece) Lefteris Choutesiotis	Atromitos	6
10	(Russia) Yuriy Lodygin	Levadiakos	6

==== Hat-tricks ====
Numbers in superscript represent the goals that the player scored.

Player	For	Against	Result	Date
(Serbia) Luka Jović	AEK Athens	Panathinaikos	3–2 (A)	30 November 2025
(Argentina) Thiago Nuss^{4}	OFI	Asteras Tripolis	4–0 (H)	11 January 2026
(Serbia) Luka Jović^{4}	AEK Athens	Panathinaikos	4–0 (H)	18 January 2026
(Switzerland) Steven Zuber^{4}	Atromitos	Panserraikos	6–0 (H)	21 May 2026

== Awards ==
=== Stoiximan Player of the Month ===
Month	Player	Club	Ref
August	(Portugal) Chiquinho	Olympiacos	
September	(Portugal) Chiquinho	Olympiacos	
October	(Greece) Giannis Konstantelias	PAOK	
November	(Russia) Magomed Ozdoyev	PAOK	
December	(Brazil) Taison	PAOK	
January	(Greece) Giorgos Giakoumakis	PAOK	
February	(Romania) Răzvan Marin	AEK Athens	
March	(Serbia) Luka Jovic	AEK Athens	
April	(Mauritania) Aboubakary Koïta	AEK Athens	
May	(Brazil) Rodinei	Olympiacos	

=== Stoiximan Player of the Club ===
Club	MVP	Ref
AEK Athens	(Mexico) Orbelín Pineda	
Olympiacos	(Greece) Konstantinos Tzolakis	
PAOK	(Greece) Giannis Konstantelias	
Panathinaikos	(Greece) Andrews Tetteh	
Aris	(Greece) Georgios Athanasiadis	
Levadiakos	(Greece) Triantafyllos Tsapras	
OFI	(Greece) Thanasis Androutsos	
Volos	(Greece) Lazaros Lamprou	
Atromitos	(Germany) Makana Baku	
A.E. Kifisia	(Greece) Andrews Tetteh	
Asteras Tripolis	(Argentina) Julian Bartolo	
Panetolikos	(Romania) Alexandru Mățan	
AEL	(Slovakia) Ľubomír Tupta	
Panserraikos	(Brazil) Alex Teixeira	

=== Stoiximan Player of the Season ===
Player	Club	Votes	Ref
(Mexico) Orbelín Pineda	AEK Athens	66.69%	

=== Stoiximan Goal of the Season ===
Player	Club	Match	Votes	Ref
(Mexico) Orbelin Pineda	AEK Athens	vs PAOK 3–0 (Matchday 2 Play-offs)	20.78%	

=== Stoiximan Best Goal ===
Matchday	Player	Club	Ref
Regular Season
1st	(Morocco) Anass Zaroury	Panathinaikos	
2nd	(Portugal) Chiquinho	Olympiacos	
3rd	(Greece) Giannis Pasas	AEL	
4th	(Morocco) Ayoub El Kaabi	Olympiacos	
5th	(Portugal) Chiquinho	Olympiacos	
6th	(Greece) Giannis Apostolakis	OFI	
7th	(Morocco) Ayoub El Kaabi	Olympiacos	
8th	(Greece) Giorgos Giakoumakis	PAOK	
9th	(Italy) Alessandro Bianco	PAOK	
10th	(Greece) Giannis Konstantelias	PAOK	
11th	(Croatia) Tin Jedvaj	Panathinaikos	
12th	(Greece) Giorgos Giakoumakis	PAOK	
13th	(Morocco) Ayoub El Kaabi	Olympiacos	
14th	(Nigeria) Cyriel Dessers	Panathinaikos	
15th	(Italy) Eddie Salcedo	OFI	
16th	(Argentina) Thiago Nuss	OFI	
17th	(Brazil) Taison	PAOK	
18th	(Serbia) Luka Jovic	AEK Athens	
19th	(Greece) Andrews Tetteh	Panathinaikos	
20th	(Argentina) Vicente Taborda	Panathinaikos	
21st	(Slovakia) Ľubomír Tupta	AEL	
22nd	(Greece) Petros Mantalos	AEK Athens	
23rd	(Portugal) Filipe Relvas	AEK Athens	
24th	(Greece) Giorgos Kyriakopoulos	Panathinaikos	
25th	(Serbia) Luka Jović	AEK Athens	
26th	(Hungary) Barnabás Varga	AEK Athens	
Play-offs
1st & 2nd	(Mexico) Orbelín Pineda	AEK Athens	
3rd & 4th	(Angola) Zini	AEK Athens	
5th & 6th	(Serbia) Luka Jovic	AEK Athens	
Play-outs
1st & 2nd	(Serbia) Kosta Aleksić	Panetolikos	
3rd, 4th & 5th	(Greece) Andreas Bouchalakis	Panetolikos	
6th, 7th & 8th	(Slovakia) Ľubomír Tupta	AEL	
9th & 10th	(Argentina) Facundo Pérez	AEL	

=== Annual awards ===
Annual awards were announced on 2 November 2026.

Award	Winner	Club
Greek Player of the Season	(Greece) Giannis Konstantelias	PAOK
Foreign Player of the Season	(Mexico) Orbelín Pineda	AEK Athens
Young Player of the Season	(Greece) Sotiris Kontouris	Panetolikos / Panathinaikos
Goalkeeper of the Season	(Albania) Thomas Strakosha	AEK Athens
Golden Boot	(Morocco) Ayoub El Kaabi	Olympiacos
Manager of the Season	(Serbia) Marko Nikolić	AEK Athens

Team of the Season
Goalkeeper	(Albania) Thomas Strakosha (AEK Athens)			
Defence	(Greece) Lazaros Rota (AEK Athens) / (Greece) Triantafyllos Tsapras (Levadiakos)	(Greece) Panagiotis Retsos (Olympiacos)	(Portugal) Filipe Relvas (AEK Athens)	(Greece) Marios Vichos (Levadiakos)
Midfield	(Serbia) Andrija Živković (PAOK) / (Portugal) Gelson Martins (Olympiacos)	(Mexico) Orbelín Pineda (AEK Athens)	(Romania) Răzvan Marin (AEK Athens)	(Greece) Giannis Konstantelias (PAOK)
Attack	(Greece) Andrews Tetteh (A.E. Kifisia/Panathinaikos) / (Morocco) Ayoub El Kaabi (Olympiacos)		(Serbia) Luka Jović (AEK Athens)	

== Attendances ==
Olympiacos drew the highest average home attendance in the 2025–26 edition of the Super League Greece.

#	Team	Total attendance	Average attendance
1	Olympiacos	458,626	30,575
2	AEK Athens	399,982	26,655
3	PAOK	272,895	18,193
4	Panathinaikos	130,407	9,315
5	OFI	83,511	6,424
6	AEL	98,293	5,461
7	Aris	74,506	4,657
8	Volos	47,291	2,956
9	Panetolikos	39,720	2,207
10	Panserraikos	39,519	2,196
11	Asteras Tripolis	36,900	2,050
12	Levadiakos	28,594	1,787
13	Atromitos	25,039	1,391
14	A.E. Kifisia	18,137	1,007
