= 2026–27 Olympiacos F.C. season =

Olympiacos
2026–27 season
- Owner: Evangelos Marinakis
- President: Evangelos Marinakis
- Manager: José Luis Mendilibar (1 June 2026 - 9 September 2026); Imanol Alguacil (from 10 September 2026)
- Stadium: Karaiskakis Stadium
- Super League Greece: 2nd
- Greek Cup: League phase
- Champions League: Third qualifying round
- Europa League: League phase
- Top goalscorer: League: Jota Silva (6); All: Armando González (7)
- Highest home attendance: 33,113
- Lowest home attendance: 26,614
- Biggest win: Olympiacos 5-0 Kalamata
- Biggest defeat: Nijmegen 2-1 Olympiacos
Home colours	Away colours	Third colours
- All statistics correct as of 25 October 2026.

The 2026–27 season is the 102nd season in existence of Olympiacos and the club's 68th consecutive season in the top flight of Greek football. In addition to the Greek Super League, Olympiacos participates in this season's Greek Cup, UEFA Champions League and UEFA Europa League as the runner-up of the 2025–26 Greek Super League. The season covers the period from June 2026 to late May 2027.

== Players ==
=== First team ===
As of 20 September 2026

Squad No.	Name	Nationality	Position(s)	Place of birth	Date of birth (Age)	Previous club
Goalkeepers
1	Stefan Ortega	(Germany) (Spain)	GK	Hofgeismar, Germany	6 November 1992 (33)	(England) Nottingham Forest
31	Balša Popović	(Montenegro)	GK	Kotor, Montenegro	10 June 2000 (26)	(Serbia) Red Star Belgrade
91	Dimitrios Stournaras	(Greece)	GK	Davleia, Greece	30 May 2001 (25)	(Greece) Iraklis
Defenders
2	Manolis Saliakas	(Greece)	RB	Heraklion, Greece	12 September 1996 (30)	(Germany) St. Pauli
4	Zinedin Smajlović	(Sweden) (Bosnia and Herzegovina)	CB	Stockholm, Sweden	20 December 2003 (22)	(Norway) Sandefjord
5	Lorenzo Pirola	(Italy)	CB	Carate Brianza, Italy	20 February 2002 (24)	(Italy) Salernitana
6	David Carmo	(Angola) (Portugal)	CB	Aveiro, Portugal	19 July 1999 (27)	(England) Nottingham Forest
27	Marcus Pedersen	(Norway)	RB	Hammerfest, Norway	16 July 2000 (26)	(Italy) Torino
45	Panagiotis Retsos	(Greece)	CB	Johannesburg, South Africa	9 August 1998 (28)	(Italy) Hellas Verona
70	Bruno Onyemaechi	(Nigeria)	LB	Owerri, Nigeria	3 April 1999 (27)	(Portugal) Boavista
71	Nair Tiknizyan	(Armenia) (Russia)	LB	Saint Petersburg, Russia	12 May 1999 (27)	(Serbia) Red Star Belgrade
Midfielders
7	Kostas Fortounis	(Greece)	AM	Trikala, Greece	16 October 1992 (34)	(Saudi Arabia) Al-Khaleej
8	Gustavo Sá	(Portugal)	AM	Póvoa de Varzim, Portugal	11 November 2004 (21)	(England) Nottingham Forest
10	Gelson Martins	(Cape Verde) (Portugal)	RW	Praia, Cape Verde	11 May 1995 (31)	(France) Monaco
15	Gustavo Puerta	(Colombia)	CM	La Victoria, Colombia	23 July 2003 (23)	(Spain) Racing Santander
16	Lorenzo Scipioni	(Argentina) (Italy)	DM/CM	Buenos Aires, Argentina	20 November 2004 (21)	(Argentina) Tigre
17	Leon Bailey	(Jamaica)	RW	Kingston, Jamaica	9 August 1997 (29)	(England) Aston Villa
19	Remo Freuler	(Switzerland)	DM	Ennenda, Switzerland	15 April 1992 (34)	(Italy) Bologna
21	Theofanis Bakoulas	(Greece)	DM	Athens, Greece	4 January 2005 (21)	(Portugal) Rio Ave
22	Chiquinho	(Portugal)	CM/AM	Santo Tirso, Portugal	19 July 1995 (31)	(Portugal) Benfica
32	Santiago Hezze	(Argentina) (Poland)	DM/CM	Buenos Aires, Argentina	22 October 2001 (25)	(Argentina) Huracán
73	Joel Roca	(Spain)	LW/AM	Camprodon, Spain	7 June 2005 (21)	(Spain) Girona
77	Christos Filis	(Greece)	DM	Aspropyrgos, Greece	25 June 2007 (19)	(Greece) Olympiacos U19
97	Yusuf Yazıcı	(Turkey)	AM	Trabzon, Turkey	29 January 1997 (29)	(France) Lille
Forwards
9	Ayoub El Kaabi	(Morocco)	FW	Casablanca, Morocco	25 June 1993 (33)	(Qatar) Al Sadd
11	Roman Yaremchuk	(Ukraine)	FW	Lviv, Ukraine	27 November 1995 (30)	(Belgium) Club Brugge
20	Jota Silva	(Portugal)	FW	Melres, Portugal	1 August 1999 (27)	(England) Nottingham Forest
34	Armando González	(Mexico)	FW	Celaya, Mexico	20 April 2003 (23)	(Mexico) Guadalajara
90	Clayton	(Brazil)	FW	Belo Horizonte, Brazil	11 January 1999 (27)	(Portugal) Rio Ave
99	Marius Mouandilmadji	(Chad)	FW	Doba, Chad	22 January 1998 (28)	(Turkey) Samsunspor

== Backroom staff ==
=== Coaching staff ===
Position	Staff
Head coach	(Spain) Imanol Alguacil (from 10/9/26)
Head coach	(Spain) José Luis Mendilibar (until 9/9/26)
Assistant coach	(Greece) Avraam Papadopoulos
Analysts	(Greece) Giannis Vogiatzakis
Analysts	(Greece) Iosif Loukas
Fitness coach	(Greece) Christos Mourikis
Goalkeepers coach	(Greece) Panagiotis Agriogiannis
Assistant Goalkeepers coach	(Greece) Makis Veniamin
Rehabilitation trainer	(Greece) Kostas Liougkos
Sports director	(Serbia) Darko Kovačević
Assistant sports director	(Spain) Jose Ignacio Navarro
General Director of Football Business and International Club Strategy	(Portugal) Antonio Miguel Cardoso
Strategic Advisor & Ambassador	(France) Christian Karembeu
Medical team
Doctor	(Greece) Christos Theos
Physios	(Greece) Nikos Lykouresis
Physios	(Greece) Stavros Petrocheilos
Physios	(Greece) Spyros Kavvadias
Physios	(Greece) Dionisis Papadopoulos
Nutritionist	(Portugal) Hernani Araujo Gomes
Scouts
Scouting Coordinator	(Spain) Jaime Cordon
Scouting and Sports Technology	(Greece) Giannis Theodorou
Scout	(Greece) Simos Havos

== Transfers ==
=== In ===
Νο.	Pos.	Nat.	Name	Age	Moving from	Type	Transfer window	Transfer fee	Notes
11	FW	(Ukraine)	Roman Yaremchuk	30	(France) Lyon	End of Loan	Summer	Free	
7	MF	(Greece)	Kostas Fortounis	34	(Saudi Arabia) Al-Khaleej	Transfer	Summer	Free	
25	MF	(Argentina)	Pablo Maffeo	29	(Spain) Mallorca	Transfer	Summer	€2.7M	
91	GK	(Greece)	Dimitrios Stournaras	25	(Greece) Iraklis	Transfer	Summer	Free	
6	DF	(Angola)	David Carmo	27	(England) Nottingham Forest	Transfer	Summer	€9M	
31	GK	(Montenegro)	Balša Popović	26	(Serbia) Red Star Belgrade	Transfer	Summer	€1.5M	
4	DF	(Sweden)	Zinedin Smajlović	22	(Norway) Sandefjord	Transfer	Summer	€5M	
20	FW	(Portugal)	Jota Silva	27	(England) Nottingham Forest	Transfer	Summer	€4M	
73	MF	(Spain)	Joel Roca	21	(Spain) Girona	Transfer	Summer	€5M	
2	DF	(Greece)	Manolis Saliakas	29	(Germany) St. Pauli	Transfer	Summer	€1.3M	
1	GK	(Germany)	Stefan Ortega	33	(England) Nottingham Forest	Transfer	Summer	Free	
8	MF	(Portugal)	Gustavo Sá	21	(England) Nottingham Forest	Loan	Summer	Free	
19	MF	(Switzerland)	Remo Freuler	34	(Italy) Bologna	Transfer	Summer	Free	
71	DF	(Armenia)	Nair Tiknizyan	27	(Serbia) Red Star Belgrade	Transfer	Summer	€6M	
34	FW	(Mexico)	Armando González	23	(Mexico) Guadalajara	Transfer	Summer	€8.6M	
27	DF	(Norway)	Marcus Pedersen	26	(Italy) Torino	Transfer	Summer	€6M	
15	MF	(Colombia)	Gustavo Puerta	23	(Spain) Santander	Transfer	Summer	€16M	
17	MF	(Jamaica)	Leon Bailey	29	(England) Aston Villa	Transfer	Summer	€5M	
99	FW	(Chad)	Marius Mouandilmadji	28	(Turkey) Samsunspor	Transfer	Summer	€7M	

▼ Total Spending: €76.1M

=== Out ===
Νο.	Pos.	Nat.	Name	Age	Moving to	Type	Transfer window	Transfer fee	Notes
56	MF	(Portugal)	Daniel Podence	30	(Saudi Arabia) Al-Shabab	End of Loan	Summer	Free	
6	DF	(Greece)	Alexis Kalogeropoulos	22	(Germany) Nürnberg	Transfer	Summer	Free	
31	GK	(Greece)	Nikolaos Botis	22	(Poland) Pogoń Szczecin	Transfer	Summer	Free	
20	DF	(Portugal)	Costinha	26	(England) Brighton	Transfer	Summer	€12.7M	
4	DF	(France)	Giulian Biancone	26	(Belgium) Anderlecht	Transfer	Summer	€2.5M	
	DF	(Israel)	Doron Leidner	24	(Israel) Hapoel Tel Aviv	Transfer	Summer	€350k	
1	GK	(Greece)	Alexandros Paschalakis	37		Transfer	Summer	Free	
21	DF	(Portugal)	Rúben Vezo	32		Transfer	Summer	Free	
8	MF	(Portugal)	Diogo Nascimento	23	(Portugal) Rio Ave	Loan	Summer	Free	
	FW	(Spain)	Jefté Betancor	33	(Spain) Las Palmas	Transfer	Summer	Free	
67	MF	(Greece)	Argyris Liatsikouras	19	(Greece) Kalamata	Loan	Summer	Free	
	MF	(Greece)	Antonis Papakanellos	21	(Greece) Asteras Tripolis	Loan	Summer	Free	
88	GK	(Greece)	Konstantinos Tzolakis	23	(England) Hull City	Transfer	Summer	€23.3M	
	MF	(Brazil)	Gabriel Strefezza	29	(Italy) Palermo	Transfer	Summer	€4M	
3	DF	(Argentina)	Francisco Ortega	27	(Argentina) River Plate	Transfer	Summer	€5M	
	MF	(Greece)	Georgios Masouras	32	(Saudi Arabia) Neom	Transfer	Summer		
17	MF	(Brazil)	André Luiz	24	(United States) Kansas City	Transfer	Summer	€15.5M	
99	FW	(Iran)	Mehdi Taremi	34	(United Arab Emirates) Al Wasl	Transfer	Summer	€400k	
25	DF	(Argentina)	Pablo Maffeo	29	(Spain) Valencia	Loan	Summer	Free	
96	MF	(Greece)	Christos Mouzakitis	19	(England) Hull City	Transfer	Summer	€15M	
23	MF	(Brazil)	Rodinei	34	(Brazil) Santos	Transfer	Summer	Free	
	MF	(France)	Rémy Cabella	36	(Greece) Volos	Transfer	Summer	Free	
14	MF	(Spain)	Dani García	36	(Greece) Atromitos	Transfer	Summer	Free	

▲ Total Income: €78.75M

Net Income: ▲€2.65M

== Friendlies ==
Win Draw Loss

8 July 2026	(Poland) Raków Częstochowa	1–2	Olympiacos (Greece)	Vlaardingen, Netherlands
19:00 EEST	Brunes 70'	Report	Fortounis 85'; Yaremchuk 90+3'	Stadium: Sportpark 't Nieuwelant

11 July 2026	(Belgium) OH Leuven	1–1	Olympiacos (Greece)	Vlaardingen, Netherlands
14:30 EEST	Murru 87'	Report	André Luiz 68'	Stadium: Sportpark 't Nieuwelant

17 July 2026	(Netherlands) Fortuna Sittard	1–3	Olympiacos (Greece)	Vlaardingen, Netherlands
19:30 EEST	Oukili 56'	Report	Jota Silva 20', 24', 58' (pen.)	Stadium: Sportpark 't Nieuwelant

18 July 2026	(Netherlands) Ajax	1–0	Olympiacos (Greece)	Duivendrecht, Netherlands
16:30 EEST	Edvardsen 80'	Report		Stadium: Sportpark De Toekomst

24 July 2026	(Belgium) Antwerp	3–0	Olympiacos (Greece)	Antwerp, Belgium
20:00 EEST	Somers 68', 78'; Verstraeten 74'	Report		Stadium: Bosuilstadion

25 July 2026	(Netherlands) AZ Alkmaar	3–2	Olympiacos (Greece)	Alkmaar, Netherlands
16:30 EEST	Meerdink 73', 87' (pen.); Carmo 77' (o.g.)		El Kaabi 24'; Carmo 45'	Stadium: AFAS Stadion

== Competitions ==
=== Overview ===
Competition	Starting round	Record							
Competition	Starting round	Pld	W	D	L	GF	GA	GD	Win %
Super League Greece	Matchday 1	11	8	2	1	22	7	+15	72.73
Greek Football Cup	League Phase	3	3	0	0	9	2	+7	100.00
UEFA Champions League	3rd Qualifying Round	2	0	1	1	1	2	−1	0.00
UEFA Europa League	League Phase	4	3	1	0	4	1	+3	75.00
Total		20	14	4	2	36	12	+24	70.00

Last updated: 22 November 2026
Source: Competitions

=== Super League Greece ===
==== League table ====
Pos	Team	Pld	W	D	L	GF	GA	GD	Pts	Qualification or relegation
1	Panathinaikos	10	9	0	1	22	5	+17	27	Qualification for the Championship play-offs
2	AEK Athens	10	7	2	1	24	6	+18	23	Qualification for the Championship play-offs
3	Olympiacos	10	7	2	1	16	5	+11	23	Qualification for the Championship play-offs
4	PAOK	10	6	1	3	19	13	+6	19	Qualification for the Championship play-offs
5	Aris	10	6	1	3	16	17	−1	19	Qualification for the Europe play-offs

Updated to match(es) played on 8 November 2026. Source: Super League Greece
Rules for classification: 1) Points; 2) Head-to-head points; 3) Head-to-head goal difference; 4) Overall goal difference.

==== Results summary ====
Overall								Home						Away					
Pld	W	D	L	GF	GA	GD	Pts	W	D	L	GF	GA	GD	W	D	L	GF	GA	GD
11	8	2	1	22	7	+15	26	4	1	1	14	4	+10	4	1	0	8	3	+5

Last updated: 22 November 2026.

==== Results by matchday ====
Matchday	1	2	3	4	5	6	7	8	9	10	11	12	13	14	15	16	17	18	19	20	21	22	23	24	25	26
Ground	Η	Α	Α	Η	Α	Η	Α	Η	Α	Η	Η	Α	Η	Α	Η	Α	Α	Η	Α	Η	Η	Α	Η	Α	Η	Α
Result	W	W	D	L	W	W	W	W	W	D	W															
Position	6	4	3	6	5	3	2	2	2	2	2															

Updated to match(es) played on 22 November 2026. Source: Super League Greece
A = Away; H = Home; W = Win; D = Draw; L = Loss

==== Regular season matches ====
Win Draw Loss

22 August 2026 1	Olympiacos	1–0	Atromitos	Piraeus
21:30 EEST	Martins (yellow card) 44'; Hezze (yellow card) 53'; Carmo 82'; Rodinei (yellow card) 65', (red card) 90+1'	Report	Tsingaras (yellow card) 15'; Tsantilas (yellow card) 24'; Uronen (yellow card) 26'; Tsiloulis (yellow card) 79'; Karamanis (yellow card) 84'; Tzovaras (yellow card) 90+4'	Stadium: Karaiskakis Stadium; Attendance: 26.614; Referee: Alexandros Tsakalidis

30 August 2026 2	Asteras Tripolis	0–1	Olympiacos	Tripoli
21:00 EEST		Report	Jota Silva 21'	Stadium: Theodoros Kolokotronis Stadium; Attendance: 3.230; Referee: Fotis Polychronis

5 September 2026 3	Volos	1–1	Olympiacos	Volos
19:00 EEST	Comba 76'	Report	Jota Silva 45+3' (pen.)	Stadium: Panthessaliko Stadium; Attendance: 5.916; Referee: Athanasios Tzilos

12 September 2026 4	Olympiacos	0–1	OFI	Piraeus
19:00 EEST		Report	Kodro 66'	Stadium: Karaiskakis Stadium; Attendance: 29.575; Referee: Vassilis Fotias

20 September 2026 5	Levadiakos	0–1	Olympiacos	Livadeia
17:00 EEST		Report	Saliakas 90+2'	Stadium: Livadeia Municipal Stadium; Attendance: 3.089; Referee: Stavros Tsimenteridis

11 October 2026 6	Olympiacos	1–0	Panathinaikos	Piraeus
21:00 EEST	Retsos 34'; Saliakas (yellow card) 63' (yellow-red card) 66'	Report		Stadium: Karaiskakis Stadium; Attendance: 33.113; Referee: Alejandro Hernández Hernández (Spain)

18 October 2026 7	Panetolikos	0–2	Olympiacos	Agrinio
17:00 EEST		Report	Roca 17'; Chiquinho 73'	Stadium: Panetolikos Stadium; Attendance: 3.818; Referee: Eleftherios Matsoukas

25 October 2026 8	Olympiacos	5–0	Kalamata	Piraeus
16:00 EEST	Jota Silva 37', 40', 46'; Marius 74'; Bailey 85'	Report		Stadium: Karaiskakis Stadium; Referee: Spyridon Zampalas

31 October 2026 9	Kifisia	2–3	Olympiacos	Athens
19:00 EEST	Mboula 80'; Sousa 90+1'	Report	Roca 46'; Marius 71'; Martins 90+5'	Stadium: Leoforos Alexandras Stadium; Attendance: 847; Referee: Konstantinos Tsetsilas

8 November 2026 10	Olympiacos	1–1	PAOK	Piraeus
21:00 EET	González 58'	Report	Živković 71'	Stadium: Karaiskakis Stadium; Attendance: 32.515; Referee: José María Sánchez (ESP)

22 November 2026 11	Olympiacos	6–2	Iraklis	Piraeus
19:00 EET	Scipioni 26'; Jota Silva 45+3'; Bailey 54' (pen.), 81'; Marius 58'; González 83'	Report	Žulevič 23', 37'	Stadium: Karaiskakis Stadium; Referee: Stavros Tsimenteridis

29 November 2026 12	Aris	–	Olympiacos	Thessaloniki
19:00 EET				Stadium: Kleanthis Vikelidis Stadium

5 December 2026 13	Olympiacos	–	AEK Athens	Piraeus
20:00 EET				Stadium: Karaiskakis Stadium

December 2026 14	Atromitos	–	Olympiacos	Peristeri
: EET				Stadium: Peristeri Stadium

December 2026 15	Olympiacos	–	Panetolikos	Piraeus
: EET				Stadium: Karaiskakis Stadium

January 2027 16	Kalamata	–	Olympiacos	Kalamata
: EET				Stadium: Kalamata Municipal Stadium

January 2027 17	PAOK	–	Olympiacos	Thessaloniki
: EET				Stadium: Toumba Stadium

January 2027 18	Olympiacos	–	Levadiakos	Piraeus
: EET				Stadium: Karaiskakis Stadium

January 2027 19	Panathinaikos	–	Olympiacos	Athens
: EET				Stadium: Athens Olympic Stadium

February 2027 20	Olympiacos	–	Asteras Tripolis	Piraeus
: EET				Stadium: Karaiskakis Stadium

February 2027 21	Olympiacos	–	Volos	Piraeus
: EET				Stadium: Karaiskakis Stadium

February 2027 22	Iraklis	–	Olympiacos	Thessaloniki
: EET				Stadium: Kaftanzoglio Stadium

February 2027 23	Olympiacos	–	Aris	Piraeus
: EET				Stadium: Karaiskakis Stadium

March 2027 24	AEK Athens	–	Olympiacos	Nea Filadelfeia
: EET				Stadium: Agia Sophia Stadium

March 2027 25	Olympiacos	–	A.E. Kifisia	Piraeus
: EET				Stadium: Karaiskakis Stadium

March 2027 26	OFI	–	Olympiacos	Heraklion
: EET				Stadium: Theodoros Vardinogiannis Stadium

=== Greek Football Cup ===
==== League phase ====
Pos	Team	Pld	W	D	L	GF	GA	GD	Pts	Qualification
1	Olympiacos	3	3	0	0	9	2	+7	9	Advance to Quarter-finals
2	Panathinaikos	3	3	0	0	5	1	+4	9	Advance to Quarter-finals
3	PAOK	3	2	1	0	4	1	+3	7	Advance to Quarter-finals
4	AEK Athens	3	2	0	1	11	4	+7	6	Advance to Quarter-finals
5	Atromitos	3	2	0	1	4	2	+2	6	Advance to Play-offs (seeded)

Updated to match(es) played on 28 October 2026. Source: League Phase Results and Standings

Round	1	2	3	4	5
Ground	A	H	-	A	H
Result	W	W	-	W	
Position	1	1	2	1	

A = Away; H = Home; W = Win; D = Draw; L = Loss

Win Draw Loss Fixtures

2 September 2026 1	AEL	0–4	Olympiacos	Larissa
20:00 EEST			González 34'; Sá 49'; Bruno 54'; Roca 66'	Stadium: AEL FC Arena; Referee: Alexandros Katsikogiannis

8 September 2026 2	Olympiacos	3–2	Volos	Piraeus
21:45 EET	González 42', 50'; Puerta 68'		M.González 79'; Charalampoglou 89'	Stadium: Karaiskakis Stadium; Referee: Christos Vergetis

28 October 2026 4	Marko	0–2	Olympiacos	Markopoulo
15:00 EEST			Saliakas 15'; Carmo 71'	Stadium: Markopoulo Municipal Stadium; Referee: Konstantinos Katoikos

December 2026 5	Olympiacos	–	Panathinaikos	Piraeus
: EET				Stadium: Karaiskakis Stadium

=== UEFA Champions League ===
Win Draw Loss

==== Third qualifying round ====
4 August 2026 First leg	Olympiacos (Greece)	0–0	(Netherlands) NEC	Piraeus, Greece
21:00 EEST		Report		Stadium: Karaiskakis Stadium; Attendance: 31,134; Referee: José María Sánchez Martínez (Spain)

11 August 2026 Second leg	NEC (Netherlands)	2–1 (a.e.t.) (2–1 agg.)	(Greece) Olympiacos	Nijmegen, Netherlands
20:30 EEST	Linssen 70'; Mor 95'	Report	El Kaabi 46'; Fortounis (red card) 77'	Stadium: Goffertstadion; Attendance: 11,700; Referee: Maurizio Mariani (Italy)

=== UEFA Europa League ===
==== League phase ====
Pos	Team	Pld	W	D	L	GF	GA	GD	Pts	Qualification
4	(Belgium) Union Saint-Gilloise	4	3	1	0	10	2	+8	10	Advance to round of 16 (seeded)
5	(Italy) Juventus	4	3	1	0	11	4	+7	10	Advance to round of 16 (seeded)
6	(Greece) Olympiacos	4	3	1	0	4	1	+3	10	Advance to round of 16 (seeded)
7	(Germany) Bayer Leverkusen	4	3	0	1	8	1	+7	9	Advance to round of 16 (seeded)
8	(Turkey) Beşiktaş	4	2	1	1	11	8	+3	7	Advance to round of 16 (seeded)

Updated to match(es) played on 5 November 2026. Source: UEFA
Rules for classification: League phase tiebreakers

Round	1	2	3	4	5	6	7	8
Ground	H	A	H	A	H	A	H	A
Result	W	W	W	D				
Position	13	10	5	6				

Updated to match(es) played on 4 November 2026. Source: UEFA
A = Away; H = Home; W = Win; D = Draw; L = Loss

Win Draw Loss Fixtures

16 September 2026 1	Olympiacos (Greece)	2–1	(Poland) Jagiellonia Białystok	Piraeus, Greece
22:00 EEST	Onyemaechi (yellow card) 38'; González 43'; Hezze (yellow card) 76'; Yaremchuk 84'	Report	Szmyt 20'; Wojtuszek (yellow card) 29'; Montóia (yellow card) 54'; Vital (yellow card) 80'	Stadium: Karaiskakis Stadium; Attendance: 30,540; Referee: Harm Osmers (Germany)

15 October 2026 2	Marseille (France)	0–1	(Greece) Olympiacos	Marseille, France
22:00 EEST	Abdallah (yellow card) 36'; Meïté (yellow card) 77'	Report	Hezze 42'; Retsos (yellow card) 43'; Onyemaechi (yellow card) 60'	Stadium: Stade Vélodrome; Attendance: 57,051; Referee: Michael Oliver (England)

22 October 2026 3	Olympiacos (Greece)	1–0	(Czech Republic) Sparta Prague	Piraeus, Greece
22:00 EEST	González 78'; Jota Silva (yellow card) 83'; Martins (yellow card) 90+2'	Report	Zelený (yellow card) 29'; Macek (yellow card) 38'; Singhateh (yellow card) 77'; Suchomel (yellow card) 80'	Stadium: Karaiskakis Stadium; Referee: Espen Eskås (Norway)

5 November 2026 4	Rennes (France)	0–0	(Greece) Olympiacos	Rennes, France
19:45 EET	Rongier (yellow card) 88'	Report		Stadium: Roazhon Park; Attendance: 27,276; Referee: Igor Pajač (Croatia)

26 November 2026 5	Olympiacos (Greece)	–	(Italy) Milan	Piraeus, Greece
19:45 EET				Stadium: Karaiskakis Stadium

10 December 2026 6	Celje (Slovenia)	–	(Greece) Olympiacos	Stadion Z'dežele
19:45 EET				Attendance: Celje, Slovenia

21 January 2027 7	Olympiacos (Greece)	–	(Germany) TSG Hoffenheim	Piraeus, Greece
19:45 EET				Stadium: Karaiskakis Stadium

28 January 2027 8	Torreense (Portugal)	–	(Greece) Olympiacos	Estádio Dr. Magalhães Pessoa
22:00 EET				Attendance: Leiria, Portugal

== Squad statistics ==
=== Appearances ===
As of 22 November 2026

No.	Pos.	Nat.	Name	Super League Greece	Greek Cup	UEFA Champions League	UEFA Europa League	Total
No.	Pos.	Nat.	Name	Apps	Apps	Apps	Apps	Apps
45	DF	(Greece)	Panagiotis Retsos	9	0(1)	2	4	15(1)
1	GK	(Germany)	Stefan Ortega	11	0	0	4	15
5	DF	(Italy)	Lorenzo Pirola	10	0	1(1)	3	14(1)
20	MF	(Portugal)	Jota Silva	9(2)	0(1)	1(1)	3	13(4)
19	MF	(Switzerland)	Remo Freuler	8(2)	1(1)	0	2(1)	11(4)
22	MF	(Portugal)	Chiquinho	7(2)	0	1(1)	3(1)	11(4)
2	DF	(Greece)	Manolis Saliakas	5(1)	1	1	4	11(2)
71	DF	(Armenia)	Nair Tiknizyan	9(1)	1(1)	0	0(4)	10(6)
32	MF	(Argentina)	Santiago Hezze	4(5)	1	1	4	10(5)
15	MF	(Colombia)	Gustavo Puerta	6(1)	2	0	2(2)	10(3)
70	DF	(Nigeria)	Bruno Onyemaechi	2(2)	2	2	4	10(2)
7	MF	(Greece)	Kostas Fortounis	6(3)	2(1)	0(1)	1(1)	9(6)
10	MF	(Portugal)	Gelson Martins	1(9)	2(1)	1(1)	3(1)	7(12)
8	MF	(Portugal)	Gustavo Sá	3(6)	2	1	1(2)	7(8)
73	MF	(Spain)	Joel Roca	6(3)	0(1)	1(1)	0	7(5)
34	FW	(Mexico)	Armando González	2(6)	2	0	2(2)	6(8)
27	DF	(Norway)	Marcus Pedersen	5(1)	1(1)	0	0(3)	6(5)
6	DF	(Angola)	David Carmo	1(2)	3	1	1	6(2)
99	FW	(Chad)	Marius Mouandilmadji	4(3)	1	0	0	5(3)
4	DF	(Sweden)	Zinedin Smajlović	2(1)	3	0(2)	0	5(3)
96	FW	(Morocco)	Ayoub El Kaabi	3	0	2	0	5
31	GK	(Montenegro)	Balša Popović	0	3	2	0	5
11	FW	(Ukraine)	Roman Yaremchuk	2(2)	0(2)	0	2(2)	4(6)
14	MF	(Spain)	Dani García	1	0	2	0	3
23	MF	(Brazil)	Rodinei	1	0	2	0	3
77	MF	(Greece)	Christos Filis	0	3	0	0	3
16	MF	(Argentina)	Lorenzo Scipioni	2(1)	0(2)	0(1)	0	2(4)
17	MF	(Jamaica)	Leon Bailey	1(2)	0(1)	0	1(1)	2(4)
96	MF	(Greece)	Christos Mouzakitis	1	0	1(1)	0	2(1)
72	DF	(Greece)	Athanasios Koutsogoulas	0	2	0	0	2
21	MF	(Greece)	Theofanis Bakoulas	0	0(2)	0	0	0(2)
89	MF	(Greece)	Paschalis Toufakis	0	0(1)	0	0	0(1)
25	DF	(Argentina)	Pablo Maffeo	0	0	0(1)	0	0(1)

=== Goalscorers & Assists ===
As of 22 November 2026

No.	Pos.	Nat.	Name	Super League Greece		Greek Cup		Champions League		Europa League		Total		
No.	Pos.	Nat.	Name	G	A	G	A	G	A	G	A	Goals	Assists	G+A
34	FW	(Mexico)	Armando González	2	0	3	2	0	0	2	0	7	2	9
20	MF	(Portugal)	Jota Silva	6	2	0	0	0	0	0	0	6	2	8
99	FW	(Chad)	Marius Mouandilmadji	3	1	0	0	0	0	0	0	3	1	4
17	MF	(Jamaica)	Leon Bailey	3	1	0	0	0	0	0	0	3	1	4
73	MF	(Spain)	Joel Roca	2	1	1	0	0	0	0	0	3	1	4
2	DF	(Greece)	Manolis Saliakas	1	1	1	0	0	0	0	0	2	1	3
6	DF	(Angola)	David Carmo	1	0	1	0	0	0	0	0	2	0	2
22	MF	(Portugal)	Chiquinho	1	2	0	0	0	0	0	1	1	3	4
8	MF	(Portugal)	Gustavo Sá	0	1	1	0	0	0	0	0	1	1	2
15	MF	(Colombia)	Gustavo Puerta	0	0	1	1	0	0	0	0	1	1	2
70	DF	(Nigeria)	Bruno Onyemaechi	0	1	1	0	0	0	0	0	1	1	2
9	FW	(Morocco)	Ayoub El Kaabi	0	0	0	0	1	0	0	0	1	0	1
32	MF	(Argentina)	Santiago Hezze	0	0	0	0	0	0	1	0	1	0	1
45	DF	(Greece)	Panagiotis Retsos	1	0	0	0	0	0	0	0	1	0	1
16	MF	(Argentina)	Lorenzo Scipioni	1	0	0	0	0	0	0	0	1	0	1
11	FW	(Ukraine)	Roman Yaremchuk	0	0	0	0	0	0	1	0	1	0	1
10	MF	(Portugal)	Gelson Martins	1	0	0	0	0	0	0	0	1	0	1
19	MF	(Switzerland)	Remo Freuler	0	3	0	0	0	0	0	1	0	4	4
27	DF	(Norway)	Marcus Pedersen	0	1	0	1	0	0	0	1	0	3	3
7	MF	(Greece)	Kostas Fortounis	0	1	0	1	0	0	0	0	0	2	2
71	DF	(Armenia)	Nair Tiknizyan	0	1	0	0	0	0	0	0	0	1	1
77	MF	(Greece)	Christos Filis	0	0	0	1	0	0	0	0	0	1	1

== Individual awards ==
Name	Pos.	Award
