= List of Greek football transfers summer 2026 =

This is a list of Greek football transfers for the 2026 summer transfer window. Only transfers featuring Super League 1 are listed.

== Super League 1 ==
Note: Flags indicate national team as has been defined under FIFA eligibility rules. Players may hold more than one non-FIFA nationality.

=== AEK Athens ===
In:

No.	Pos.	Nation	Player
5	DF	GRE	Christos Alexiou (on loan from (Italy) Inter Milan U23)
6	MF	FIN	Kaan Kairinen (from (Czech Republic) Sparta Prague)
10	MF	UKR	Oleksandr Zubkov (from (Turkey) Trabzonspor)
14	MF	CRO	Lovro Majer (from (Germany) VfL Wolfsburg)
16	MF	HON	Kervin Arriaga (from (Spain) Levante)
27	MF	HUN	Milán Vitális (from (Hungary) Győr)
—	DF	GRE	Charalampos Lykogiannis (from (Italy) Bologna)

Out:

No.	Pos.	Nation	Player
4	MF	SRB	Marko Grujić (to (Bulgaria) Levski Sofia)
6	MF	DEN	Jens Jønsson (to (Denmark) AGF)
10	MF	POR	João Mário (loan return to (Turkey) Beşiktaş)
13	MF	MEX	Orbelín Pineda (to (Mexico) Monterrey)
19	MF	SWE	Niclas Eliasson (on loan to (Brazil) Internacional)
22	DF	PER	Alexander Callens (free agent)
23	MF	CRO	Robert Ljubičić (on loan to (Austria) LASK)
29	DF	SCO	James Penrice (on loan to (Scotland) Rangers)
34	DF	GRE	Christos Kosidis (free agent)
37	MF	ARG	Roberto Pereyra (free agent)
81	GK	GRE	Angelos Angelopoulos (on loan to Athens Kallithea)
—	FW	GRE	Vasilios Kontonikos (on loan to Athens Kallithea, previously on loan at PAS Giannina)
—	DF	AUS	Dimitri Valkanis (to (Australia) Brisbane Roar, previously on loan)
—	DF	GRE	Konstantinos Chrysopoulos (to Asteras Tripolis, previously on loan at (Italy) Mantova)
—	MF	GRE	Christophoros Kolimatsis (to Asteras Tripolis B, previously on loan at Hellas Syros)
—	FW	GRE	Markos Nino (to Hellas Syros, previously on loan)
—	FW	GRE	Anastasios Kontorouchas (to Saronikos Anavyssos, previously on loan at (Cyprus) ASIL Lysi)

=== Olympiacos ===
In:

No.	Pos.	Nation	Player
1	GK	GER	Stefan Ortega (from (England) Nottingham Forest)
2	DF	GRE	Manolis Saliakas (from (Germany) FC St. Pauli)
4	DF	SWE	Zinedin Smajlović (from (Norway) Sandefjord)
6	DF	ANG	David Carmo (from (England) Nottingham Forest, previously on loan at (Spain) Real Oviedo)
7	MF	GRE	Kostas Fortounis (from (Saudi Arabia) Al-Khaleej)
8	MF	POR	Gustavo Sá (on loan from (England) Nottingham Forest)
19	MF	SUI	Remo Freuler (from (Italy) Bologna)
20	FW	POR	Jota Silva (on loan from (England) Nottingham Forest)
25	DF	ARG	Pablo Maffeo (from (Spain) Espanyol)
31	GK	MNE	Balša Popović (from (Serbia) Red Star Belgrade, previously on loan at (Serbia) OFK Beograd)
71	DF	ARM	Nair Tiknizyan (from (Serbia) Red Star Belgrade)
73	MF	ESP	Joel Roca (from (Spain) Girona)
91	GK	GRE	Dimitrios Stournaras (from Iraklis)
—	FW	MEX	Armando González (from (Mexico) Guadalajara)

Out:

No.	Pos.	Nation	Player
1	GK	GRE	Alexandros Paschalakis (free agent)
3	DF	ARG	Francisco Ortega (to (Argentina) River Plate)
4	DF	FRA	Giulian Biancone (to (Belgium) Anderlecht)
6	DF	GRE	Alexis Kalogeropoulos (to (Germany) 1. FC Nürnberg)
8	MF	POR	Diogo Nascimento (on loan to (Portugal) Rio Ave)
17	FW	BRA	André Luiz (to (United States) Sporting Kansas City)
20	DF	POR	Costinha (to (England) Brighton & Hove Albion)
21	DF	POR	Rúben Vezo (free agent)
25	DF	ARG	Pablo Maffeo (on loan to (Spain) Valencia)
31	GK	GRE	Nikolaos Botis (to (Poland) Pogoń Szczecin)
56	MF	POR	Daniel Podence (loan return to (Saudi Arabia) Al Shabab)
88	GK	GRE	Konstantinos Tzolakis (to (England) Hull City)
99	FW	IRN	Mehdi Taremi (to (United Arab Emirates) Al Wasl)
—	MF	GRE	Antonis Papakanellos (on loan to Asteras Tripolis, previously on loan at (Portugal) Rio Ave)
—	DF	ISR	Doron Leidner (to (Israel) Hapoel Tel Aviv, previously on loan)
—	MF	GRE	Georgios Masouras (to (Saudi Arabia) Neom, previously on loan at Al-Khaleej)
—	FW	BRA	Gabriel Strefezza (to (Italy) Palermo, previously on loan at (Italy) Parma)
—	FW	ESP	Jefté Betancor (to (Spain) Las Palmas, previously on loan at (Spain) Albacete)

=== PAOK ===
In:

No.	Pos.	Nation	Player
4	DF	GRE	Pantelis Chatzidiakos (from (Denmark) Copenhagen)
6	DF	ESP	Aritz Elustondo (from (Spain) Real Sociedad)
7	MF	FRA	Baptiste Santamaria (from (Spain) Valencia)
13	DF	GRE	Dimitris Giannoulis (from (Germany) FC Augsburg)
22	MF	SWE	Taha Ali (from (Sweden) Malmö)
23	MF	FRA	Tom Louchet (from (France) Nice)
27	FW	SEN	Cherif Ndiaye (on loan from (Turkey) Samsunspor)

Out:

No.	Pos.	Nation	Player
4	DF	ITA	Alessandro Vogliacco (loan return to (Italy) Genoa)
6	DF	CRO	Dejan Lovren (free agent)
7	FW	GRE	Giorgos Giakoumakis (loan return to (Mexico) Cruz Azul)
16	DF	POL	Tomasz Kędziora (to (Ukraine) Dynamo Kyiv)
18	MF	CRO	Luka Ivanušec (loan return to (Netherlands) Feyenoord)
19	FW	SWE	Alexander Jeremejeff (to (Indonesia) Persija Jakarta)
22	MF	ITA	Alessandro Bianco (loan return to (Italy) Fiorentina)
23	DF	ESP	Joan Sastre (to (Cyprus) APOEL)
27	MF	RUS	Magomed Ozdoyev (to (Russia) Krasnodar)
35	DF	MEX	Jorge Sánchez (to (Mexico) Atlas)
43	MF	ESP	Mahamadou Baldé (on loan to Levadiakos)
65	MF	GRE	Giannis Konstantelias (to (Germany) Borussia Dortmund)
—	GK	GEO	Luka Gugeshashvili (on loan to (Turkey) Göztepe, previously on loan at Atromitos)
—	DF	GRE	Lefteris Lyratzis (to Atromitos, previously on loan at Panserraikos)

=== Panathinaikos ===
In:

No.	Pos.	Nation	Player
1	GK	ESP	Iñaki Peña (from (Spain) Barcelona, previously on loan at (Spain) Elche)
6	DF	NED	Stefan de Vrij (from (Italy) Inter Milan)
11	MF	MAR	Anass Zaroury (from (France) Lens, previously on loan)
19	DF	GRE	Triantafyllos Tsapras (from Levadiakos)
22	MF	FRA	Etienne Camara (from (Belgium) Charleroi)
34	DF	DEN	Victor Kristiansen (on loan from (England) Leicester City)
42	MF	ZAM	Kings Kangwa (from (Israel) Hapoel Be'er Sheva)
55	DF	NED	Rick van Drongelen (from (Turkey) Samsunspor)
74	FW	MKD	Elmin Rastoder (from (Switzerland) Thun)
99	FW	TRI	Levi García (on loan from (Russia) Spartak Moscow)
—	MF	ALB	Aidon Shehu (from (England) Hull City U21)

Out:

No.	Pos.	Nation	Player
6	MF	GRE	Manolis Siopis (to (Turkey) Fatih Karagümrük)
8	MF	POR	Renato Sanches (loan return to (France) Paris Saint-Germain)
19	FW	POL	Karol Świderski (to (Poland) Widzew Łódź)
21	DF	CRO	Tin Jedvaj (to (Saudi Arabia) Al Shabab)
26	DF	ESP	Javi Hernández (loan return to (Spain) Leganés)
27	DF	GRE	Giannis Kotsiras (to Asteras Tripolis)
31	MF	SRB	Filip Đuričić (to (Cyprus) APOEL)
40	GK	CIV	Alban Lafont (loan return to (France) Nantes)
—	MF	GRE	Markos Spatharis (to Zakynthos)
—	GK	GRE	Giorgos Karakasidis (to Iraklis, previously on loan)
—	DF	GRE	Nikolas Nikoletopoulos (to Marko, previously on loan at Panargiakos)
—	DF	SRB	Filip Mladenović (free agent, previously on loan at (Turkey) Fatih Karagümrük)
—	DF	GRE	Athanasios Prodromitis (to Panetolikos, previously on loan at Athens Kallithea)
—	MF	POR	Miguel Tavares (to Panionios, previously on loan at Kifisia)
—	MF	ALB	Enis Çokaj (to (Germany) VfL Bochum, previously on loan at Levadiakos)
—	MF	GRE	Odysseas Lazaris (to PAS Pyrgos, previously on loan at Marko)
—	MF	GRE	Dimitrios Limnios (to (Cyprus) APOEL, previously on loan at (Netherlands) Fortuna Sittard)

=== Aris ===
In:

No.	Pos.	Nation	Player
2	DF	FRA	Jeremy Petris (from (England) Watford)
3	DF	ENG	Omar Richards (from (England) Nottingham Forest, previously on loan at (Portugal) Rio Ave)
14	MF	CIV	Diallo Sanoussi (from (Denmark) Nordsjælland)
17	FW	ESP	Rafa Mir (on loan from (Spain) Sevilla, previously on loan at (Spain) Elche)
18	MF	CMR	Martin Hongla (from (Spain) Granada, previously on loan)
20	MF	NGA	Tom Dele-Bashiru (from (England) Watford, previously on loan at (Turkey) Gençlerbirliği)
24	GK	GRE	Apostolos Barbopoulos (from Ilioupoli)
33	GK	POR	Ricardo Velho (from (Portugal) Farense, previously on loan at (Turkey) Gençlerbirliği)
34	FW	ARG	Sebastián Palacios (from Levadiakos)
45	DF	SEN	Matar Thiam (from (Senegal) Rufisque Olympique Sport)
—	MF	GRE	Alexandros Lafkas (from Hellas Syros)
—	FW	SEN	Tafsir Diop (from (Senegal) Espoirs de Guediawaye)

Out:

No.	Pos.	Nation	Player
7	MF	ESP	Carles Pérez (loan return to (Spain) Celta Vigo)
15	DF	ESP	Álvaro Tejero (to (Spain) Leganés)
17	DF	CZE	Martin Frýdek (free agent)
20	DF	GAM	Noah Sonko Sundberg (to (Turkey) Göztepe)
26	MF	NED	Gabriel Misehouy (loan return to (Spain) Girona)
28	FW	BRA	Dudu (on loan to (Russia) Akron Tolyatti)
33	GK	GRE	Giorgos Athanasiadis (to Iraklis)
37	DF	MAR	Hamza Mendyl (to Volos)
77	FW	GRE	Michalis Panagidis (to (Cyprus) Krasava)
91	GK	ALB	Emiliano Karaj (to (Slovakia) Humenné)
92	DF	MRI	Lindsay Rose (to (Romania) Sepsi OSK)
—	MF	GRE	Alexandros Lafkas (on loan to Apollon Kalamarias)
—	FW	SEN	Tafsir Diop (on loan to Apollon Kalamarias)
—	MF	SEN	Clayton Diandy (to (Saudi Arabia) Al-Diriyah, previously on loan)
—	FW	GRE	Georgios Pamlidis (to Niki Volos, previously on loan at Kalamata)

=== Levadiakos ===
In:

No.	Pos.	Nation	Player
7	MF	ARG	Juan Bauza (from (Romania) FC U Craiova, previously on loan at (Colombia) Atlético Nacional)
11	MF	ARG	Agustín Urzi (on loan from (Chile) Universidad de Concepción)
15	MF	ROU	Adrian Șut (on loan from (United Arab Emirates) Al Ain)
17	MF	GRE	Dimitrios Emmanouilidis (from Asteras Tripolis)
21	MF	ESP	Mahamadou Baldé (on loan from PAOK)
66	MF	SEN	Mohamed Ndiaye (from (Senegal) Guelwaars)
77	MF	GRE	Georgios Vrakas (from (Australia) Brisbane Roar)

Out:

No.	Pos.	Nation	Player
6	DF	GRE	Triantafyllos Tsapras (to Panathinaikos)
23	MF	ALB	Enis Çokaj (loan return to Panathinaikos)
34	FW	ARG	Sebastián Palacios (to Aris)

=== OFI ===
In:

No.	Pos.	Nation	Player

Out:

No.	Pos.	Nation	Player

=== Volos ===
In:

No.	Pos.	Nation	Player
37	DF	MAR	Hamza Mendyl (from Aris)

Out:

No.	Pos.	Nation	Player

=== Atromitos ===
In:

No.	Pos.	Nation	Player
2	DF	GRE	Lefteris Lyratzis (from PAOK, previously on loan at Panserraikos)

Out:

No.	Pos.	Nation	Player
25	GK	GEO	Luka Gugeshashvili (loan return to PAOK)

=== Kifisia ===
In:

No.	Pos.	Nation	Player

Out:

No.	Pos.	Nation	Player

=== Asteras Tripolis ===
In:

No.	Pos.	Nation	Player
6	DF	GRE	Konstantinos Chrysopoulos (from AEK Athens, previously on loan at (Italy) Mantova)
27	DF	GRE	Giannis Kotsiras (from Panathinaikos)
44	MF	GRE	Antonis Papakanellos (on loan from Olympiacos, previously on loan at (Portugal) Rio Ave)

Out:

No.	Pos.	Nation	Player
11	MF	GRE	Dimitrios Emmanouilidis (to Levadiakos)

=== Panetolikos ===
In:

No.	Pos.	Nation	Player
5	DF	GRE	Athanasios Prodromitis (from Panathinaikos, previously on loan at Athens Kallithea)

Out:

No.	Pos.	Nation	Player

=== Iraklis ===
In:

No.	Pos.	Nation	Player
1	GK	GRE	Giorgos Karakasidis (from Panathinaikos, previously on loan)
33	GK	GRE	Giorgos Athanasiadis (from Aris)

Out:

No.	Pos.	Nation	Player
91	GK	GRE	Dimitrios Stournaras (to Olympiacos)

=== Kalamata ===
In:

No.	Pos.	Nation	Player

Out:

No.	Pos.	Nation	Player
14	FW	GRE	Georgios Pamlidis (loan return to Aris)

== See also ==
- 2026–27 Super League Greece
