= 2026–27 Greek Football Cup =

2026–27 Greek Cup
Superbet Greek Cup

Tournament details
- Country: Greece
- Teams: 28

Tournament statistics
- Matches played: 13
- Goals scored: 43 (3.31 per match)
- Top goal scorer(s): Konstantinos Papageorgiou (4 goals)

The 2026–27 Greek Football Cup, also named Superbet Greek Cup for sponsorship reasons, is the 85th edition of the Greek Football Cup. The winners will qualify for the 2027–28 UEFA Europa League play-off round, as well as the next season's Greek Super Cup.

The teams of the 2 professional national leagues, Super League 1 and Super League 2 will participate once again.

The competition will begin on 11 August 2026 with the qualifying round, which will include the Super League 2 teams without the B Teams and the cup winners of the Local FCAs, should they opt to participate.

In addition, extra time is abolished in matches up to the semi-finals, while each team is required to have at least two Greek players born in 2004 or later in the starting lineup and in the whole game. Additionally, players who accumulate enough yellow cards to trigger a suspension after the conclusion of the semi-final stage will no longer be barred from participating in the final.

This year's competition will follow the new conducting system from last year's competition, which includes a qualifying round, league phase, play-offs, quarter-finals, semi-finals and final, adapting the format of the competition to the UEFA standards.

OFI are the defending champions having won the 2025–26 edition of this cup.

== Calendar ==
Round	Main date(s)	Fixtures	Clubs	New entries
First Qualifying round	11 August 2026	1	14 → 13	14
Second Qualifying round	17, 18, 19, 24 August 2026	11	22 → 11	9
League phase	1, 2, 3 September/ 8, 9, 10 September/ 15, 16, 17 September 2026/ 27, 28, 29 October 2026 & 2 December 2026	32	16 → 8	5
Play-offs	22, 23 December 2026	4	8 → 4	0
Quarter-finals	12, 13, 14 January 2027	4	8 → 4	0
Semi-finals	2, 3, 4 & 9, 10, 11 February 2027	4	4 → 2	0
Final	22 May 2027	1	2 → 1	0

Source: epo.gr

== Qualifying rounds ==
The draw for the qualifying rounds took place on 31 July 2026.

=== First Qualifying round ===
The 13 teams participating in the 2026–27 Super League 2, with the exception of B Teams, will take part in the 1st qualifying round, as will the winner of the 2025–26 Greek Amateur Cup. The total number of participating teams is fourteen. From the draw, only one match is scheduled for this round and all the remaining 12 teams qualify to the next round without a match.

==== Summary ====
Team 1	Score	Team 2
11 August 2026
Trikala	0–4	AEL
N/A
Athens Kallithea	bye	
Zakynthos	bye	
PAS Pyrgos	bye	
Anagennisi Karditsa	bye	
Hellas Syros	bye	
Marko	bye	
Niki Volos	bye	
Panionios	bye	
Nestos Chrysoupoli	bye	
Apollon Kalamarias	bye	
Panserraikos	bye	
Panthrakikos	bye	

==== Matches ====
11 August 2026
18:00 EEST

Trikala	0–4	AEL
		K.Papageorgiou 11', 52'; Andrada 45'; Pinakas 63'

AEL FC Arena (Note: The match was played at AEL's stadium as a result of Trikala's stadium not getting a permit), Larissa
Referee: Georgios Tassiopoulos (Thessaly)

=== Second Qualifying round ===
The second qualifying round will feature the 1 team that will advance from the first qualifying round, the 12 teams that qualified for the second qualifying round without playing a match, and the 9 teams participating in 2026–27 Super League 1 championship, that are not competing in European competitions. The total number of participating teams is 22, with the 11 winners of the single matches, advancing to the League phase.

==== Summary ====
Team 1	Score	Team 2
17 August 2026
Athens Kallithea	1–3	AEL
Anagennisi Karditsa	0–2	Aris
Iraklis	1–3	Volos
18 August 2026
Atromitos	3–1	PAS Pyrgos
Levadiakos	0–3 (w/o)^{*}	Asteras Tripolis
19 August 2026
Niki Volos	0–0 (3–1 p)	Panionios
Zakynthos	1–6	A.E. Kifisia
Nestos Chrysoupoli	1–0	Apollon Kalamaria
Kalamata	4–2	Panetolikos
Panserraikos	2–1	Panthrakikos
24 August 2026
Hellas Syros	1–1 (3–4 p)	Marko

^{*}Levadiakos-Asteras 2–0, awarded with 0–3 due to illegal participation of a Levadeiakos player.

==== Matches ====
17 August 2026
17:00 EEST

Athens Kallithea	1–3	AEL
Manias 86'	Report	K.Papageorgiou 45', 53'; Albanis 90+3'

Grigoris Lamprakis Stadium, Kallithea
Referee: Georgios Touloumis (Euboea)

17 August 2026
18:00 EEST

Anagennisi Karditsa	0–2	Aris
	Report	Fadiga 49'; Anastasopoulos (o.g.)

Makedonikos Stadium, Efkarpia
Referee: Konstantinos Katoikos (Athens)

17 August 2026
21:00 EEST

Iraklis	1–3	Volos
Kushta 45+1'	Report	Katsikas 22'; Hatim Es-Saoubi 45+4'; Joca 60'

Serres Municipal Stadium, Serres
Referee: Fotios Ntaoulas (West Attica)

18 August 2026
19:00 EEST

Atromitos	3–1	PAS Pyrgos
Núñez 16'; Zuber 25'; Tsiloulis 68'	Report	Lemonis 75'

Peristeri Stadium, Peristeri
Referee: Stavros Tsimenteridis (Kozani)

18 August 2026
21:00 EEST

Levadiakos	0–3 (Awarded)	Asteras Tripolis
	Report

Levadia Municipal Stadium, Livadeia
Referee: Konstantinos Tsetsilas (Grevena)

19 August 2026
17:00 EEST

Niki Volos	0–0	Panionios
	Report
Penalties
Pamlidis (penalty scored); Juan Manuel Arias (penalty scored); Poletto (penalty missed); Fernández (penalty scored)	3–1	(penalty scored) Manalis; (penalty missed) Alexis Bairamidis; (penalty missed) Ulrich Fokam; (penalty missed) Vasco Gadelho

Pantelis Magoulas Stadium, Volos
Referee: Konstantinos Safouris-Argyropoulos (Serres)

19 August 2026
17:00 EEST

Zakynthos	1–6	A.E. Kifisia
Iván Silva 65' (pen.)	Report	Jagne 17'; Sagal 27'; Konstantinos Polykratis 45+2'; Antonisse 63'; Theodoridis 76'; Martins 90+1' (pen.)

Michalis Kritikopoulos Stadium, Kaisariani
Referee: Konstantinos Andrianos (Achaea)

19 August 2026
17:00 EEST

Nestos Chrysoupoli	1–0	Apollon Kalamaria
Giakoumakis 51'	Report

Municipal Stadium of Chrysoupoli, Chrysoupoli
Referee: Ioannis Tomaras (Thrace)

19 August 2026
17:15 EEST

Kalamata	4–2	Panetolikos
Kaloutsikidis 31', 78'; Vargas 34', 50'	Report	Vangelis Nikolaou 52'; Manrique 90+2' (pen.)

Grigoris Lamprakis Stadium, Kallithea
Referee: Vasilios Fitsas (Preveza Lefkada)

19 August 2026
19:00 EEST

Panserraikos	2–1	Panthrakikos
Alexandros Adam 4'; Pasas 90+2' (pen.)	Report	Gordeziani 24'

Serres Municipal Stadium, Serres
Referee: Dimitrios Gaitatzis (Drama)

24 August 2026
17:30 EEST

Hellas Syros	1–1	Marko
Nino 90+2' (pen.)	Report	Necul 90'
Penalties
Vasilios Tsiantoulas (penalty scored); Georgios Gemistos (penalty missed); Emiljano Bullari (penalty scored); Demir Zahi (penalty scored); Nino (penalty missed)	3–4	(penalty scored) Kyriakidis; (penalty scored) El-Arabi; (penalty missed) Sebá; (penalty scored) Necul; (penalty scored) Mendoza

Municipal Stadium of Ermoupoli, Ermoupoli
Attendance: 800
Referee: Eleni Antoniou (Achaea)

== League phase ==
The league phase of the competition will feature the 5 teams that participate this year in European football competitions, along with the 11 teams that will qualify from the qualifying rounds. In total, each team will play 4 matches (2 home and 2 away).

The teams that will finish in the top 4 places, will qualify directly to the quarter-finals, while the teams that will finish in 5th to 12th place will compete in the play-offs with the winners advancing also to the quarter-finals.

=== League phase table ===
Pos	Team	Pld	W	D	L	GF	GA	GD	Pts	Qualification
1	Olympiacos	3	3	0	0	9	2	+7	9	Advance to Quarter-finals
2	Panathinaikos	3	3	0	0	5	1	+4	9	Advance to Quarter-finals
3	PAOK	3	2	1	0	4	1	+3	7	Advance to Quarter-finals
4	AEK Athens	3	2	0	1	11	4	+7	6	Advance to Quarter-finals
5	Atromitos	3	2	0	1	4	2	+2	6	Advance to Play-offs (seeded)
6	Kalamata	3	1	2	0	5	3	+2	5	Advance to Play-offs (seeded)
7	OFI	3	1	1	1	3	1	+2	4	Advance to Play-offs (seeded)
8	Asteras Tripolis	3	1	1	1	4	3	+1	4	Advance to Play-offs (seeded)
9	A.E. Kifisia	3	1	1	1	4	4	0	4	Advance to Play-offs (unseeded)
10	Aris	3	1	1	1	3	3	0	4	Advance to Play-offs (unseeded)
11	AEL	3	1	1	1	2	5	−3	4	Advance to Play-offs (unseeded)
12	Niki Volos	3	1	0	2	1	4	−3	3	Advance to Play-offs (unseeded)
13	Volos	3	0	1	2	5	8	−3	1	
14	Marko	3	0	1	2	2	5	−3	1	
15	Nestos Chrysoupoli	3	0	0	3	0	7	−7	0	
16	Panserraikos	3	0	0	3	1	10	−9	0	

Updated to match(es) played on 28 October 2026. Source: League Phase Results and Standings

=== Matches ===
==== Matchday 1 ====
1 September 2026
18:00 EEST

Volos	2–2	Kalamata
Hurtado 74'; Matías González 84'	Report	Bolívar 26'; Julián Bonetto 39'

Panthessaliko Stadium, Volos
Referee: Michail Matsoukas (Euboea)

2 September 2026
17:00 EEST

Nestos Chrysoupoli	0–2	AEK Athens
	Report	Zini 10'; Georgiev 83'

Municipal Stadium of Chrysoupoli, Chrysoupoli
Referee: Eleftherios Katopis (Samos)

2 September 2026
19:00 EEST

Marko	2–2	A.E. Kifisia
Sebá 15'; Alexopoulos 90+4'	Report	Theodoridis 19'; Christos Ligdas 48'

Michalis Kritikopoulos Stadium (Note: The match took place in the Michalis Kritikopoulos Stadium of Kaisariani due to maintenance works in the Municipal Stadium of Markopoulo), Kaisariani
Referee: Vasilios Fitsas (Preveza-Lefkada)

2 September 2026
20:00 EEST

Panserraikos	0–1	Atromitos
	Report	Tsiloulis 80'

Serres Municipal Stadium, Serres
Referee: Stavros Tsimenteridis (Kozani)

2 September 2026
20:00 EEST

AEL	0–4	Olympiacos
	Report	González 34'; Gustavo Sá 49'; Onyemaechi 54'; Roca 67'

AEL FC Arena, Larissa
Referee: Alexandros Katsikogiannis (Epirus)

2 September 2026
22:15 EEST

PAOK	0–0	OFI
	Report

Toumba Stadium, Thessaloniki
Referee: Fotis Polychronis (Pieria)

3 September 2026
21:00 EEST

Panathinaikos	1–0	Niki Volos
Taborda 59'	Report

Athens Olympic Stadium, Marousi
Referee: Konstantinos Tsetsilas (Kastoria)

==== Matchday 2 ====
8 September 2026
21:45 EEST

Olympiacos	3–2	Volos
González 42', 52'; Puerta 68'	Report	Matías González 79'; Charalampoglou 89'

Karaiskakis Stadium, Piraeus
Referee: Christos Vergetis (Arcadia)

8 September 2026
17:00 EEST

OFI	3–0	Nestos Chrysoupoli
Nuss 54'; Borja González 57'; Theodosoulakis 65'	Report

Pankritio Stadium, Heraklion
Referee: Konstantinos Tsetsilas (Grevena)

10 September 2026
17:45 EEST

Asteras Tripolis	1–1	Aris
Macheda 60'	Report	Morón 68'

Theodoros Kolokotronis Stadium, Tripoli
Referee: Athanasios Tzilos (Larissa)

==== Matchday 3 ====
16 September 2026
15:00 EEST

Niki Volos	0–3	Asteras Tripolis
	Report	Pasalidis 50' (o.g.); Ricardinho 57' (pen.); Papakanellos 67'

Pantelis Magoulas Stadium, Volos
Referee: Fotios Ntaoulas (West Attica)

16 September 2026
16:45 EEST

Aris	1–0	Marko
Pavlos Smalis 63' (o.g.)	Report

Kleanthis Vikelidis Stadium, Thessaloniki
Referee: Alexandros Katsikogiannis (Epirus)

16 September 2026
17:45 EEST

A.E. Kifisia	0–2	Panathinaikos
	Report	Ounahi 76' (pen.), 89'

Leoforos Alexandras Stadium, Ampelokipoi
Referee: Athanasios Tzilos (Larissa)

16 September 2026
20:00 EEST

Atromitos	0–1	PAOK
	Report	Mythou 20'

Peristeri Stadium, Peristeri
Referee: Konstantinos Tsetsilas (Grevena)

17 September 2026
16:30 EEST

Kalamata	1–1	AEL
Bolívar 83'	Report	Nikokyrakis 45'

Neapoli Stadium (Note: The match was played at the Neapoli Stadium (home of Ionikos) due to major ongoing renovation works at the Kalamata Municipal Stadium), Nikaia, Attica
Referee: Meletios Goumatzidis (Pella)

17 September 2026
17:45 EEST

AEK Athens	8–1	Panserraikos
Alexiou 8', 84'; Varga 33', 38'; João Mário 35'; Vitális 44'; Mantalos 45+1'; Zubkov 72'	Report	Iliadis 90+1'

Agia Sophia Stadium, Nea Filadelfeia
Referee: Spyros Zampalas (Epirus)

==== Matchday 4 ====
27 October 2026
16:00 EET

Panserraikos	0–1	Niki Volos
	Report	Christos Makrygiannis 43'

Serres Municipal Stadium, Serres
Referee: Meletios Gioumartzidis (Pella)

27 October 2026
17:30 EET

Asteras Tripolis	0–2	A.E. Kifisia
	Report	Mboula 41'; Theodoridis 51'

Theodoros Kolokotronis Stadium, Tripoli
Referee: Eleftherios Katopis (Samos)

28 October 2026
15:00 EET

Marko	0–2	Olympiacos
	Report	Saliakas 15'; Carmo 71'

Municipal Stadium of Markopoulo, Markopoulo
Referee: Konstantinos Katoikos (Athens)

28 October 2026
15:00 EET

Nestos Chrysoupoli	0–2	Kalamata
	Report	Bolívar 51'; Miranda 90+1' (pen.)

Municipal Stadium of Chrysoupoli, Chrysoupoli
Referee: Panagiotis Koukoulas (Lesbos)

28 October 2026
17:30 EET

Panathinaikos	2–1	Aris
Kontouris 10'; Rastoder 89'	Report	Kadewere 65'

Athens Olympic Stadium, Marousi
Referee: Alexandros Tsakalidis (Chalkidiki)

28 October 2026
19:30 EET

AEL	1–0	OFI
Nikolaos Nitsos 52'	Report

AEL FC Arena, Larissa
Referee: Fotios Polihronis (Pieria)

28 October 2026
20:30 EET

PAOK	3–1	AEK Athens
Banza 8'; Shoretire 70'; Ndiaye 79'	Report	Jovic 49'

Toumba Stadium, Thessaloniki
Referee: Angelos Evangelou (Athens)

29 October 2026
18:00 EET

Volos	1–3	Atromitos
Charalampoglou 8'	Report	Ofori 10'; Moutoussamy 12'; Agyakwa 22' (o.g.)

Panthessaliko Stadium, Volos
Referee: Georgios Kokkinos (Chalkidiki)

==== Matchday 5 ====
2 December 2026
XX:XX EET

Niki Volos	v	Marko
	Report

Pantelis Magoulas Stadium, Volos

2 December 2026
XX:XX EET

Kalamata	v	PAOK
	Report

TBA

2 December 2026
XX:XX EET

OFI	v	Volos
	Report

Pankritio Stadium, Heraklion

2 December 2026
XX:XX EET

Aris	v	Panserraikos
	Report

Kleanthis Vikelidis Stadium, Thessaloniki

2 December 2026
XX:XX EET

Atromitos	v	Nestos Chrysoupoli
	Report

Peristeri Stadium, Peristeri

2 December 2026
XX:XX EET

Olympiacos	v	Panathinaikos
	Report

Karaiskakis Stadium, Piraeus

2 December 2026
XX:XX EET

A.E. Kifisia	v	AEL
	Report

Leoforos Alexandras Stadium, Ampelokipoi

2 December 2026
19:00 EET

AEK Athens	v	Asteras Tripolis
	Report

Agia Sophia Stadium, Nea Filadelfeia

== Bracket ==
Play-offs
TBD
TBD
TBD
TBD
TBD
TBD
TBD
TBD

Quarter-finals
TBD
TBD
TBD
TBD
TBD
TBD
TBD
TBD

Semi-finals
TBD
TBD
TBD
TBD

Final
TBD
TBD

== Final ==
2027 Greek Football Cup final

== Top scorers ==
As of 28 October 2026

Rank	Player	Club	Goals
1	(Greece) Konstantinos Papageorgiou	AEL	4
2	(Greece) Dimitrios Theodoridis	A.E. Kifisia	3
2	(Venezuela) Jovanny Bolívar	Kalamata	3
2	(Mexico) Armando González	Olympiacos	3
