= Matías González =

Matías González may refer to:

- Matías González (football manager), Argentine football manager
- Matías González (footballer, born 1925), Uruguayan defender
- Matías González (footballer, born 1990), Argentine forward
- Matías González (footballer, born 1992), Uruguayan defender
- Matías González (footballer, born 1993), Uruguayan defender
- Matías González (footballer, born 1994), Argentine defender
- Matías González (footballer, born 1997), Argentine forward
- Matías González (footballer, born 1999), Argentine forward
- Matías González (politician), Filipino politician
