= Leidner =

Leidner is a surname. Notable people with the surname include:

- Doron Leidner (born 2002), Israeli footballer
- Mitch Leidner (born 1994), American college football player
