= Gustavo Puerta =

Colombian footballer (born 2003)

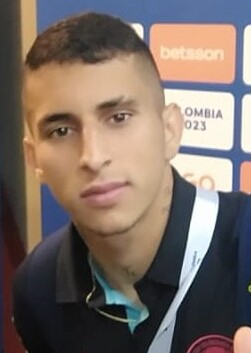
- Puerta with Colombia U20 in 2023

Personal information
- Full name: Gustavo Adolfo Puerta Molano
- Date of birth: 23 July 2003 (age 23)
- Place of birth: La Victoria, Colombia
- Height: 1.71 m (5 ft 7 in)
- Position: Central midfielder

Team information
- Current team: Olympiacos
- Number: 15

Youth career
- Supercampeones
- Talentos Gustavo Victoria

Senior career*
Years	Team	Apps	(Gls)
2021–2023	Bogotá	34	(3)
2023–2025	Bayer Leverkusen	7	(0)
2023	→ 1. FC Nürnberg (loan)	0	(0)
2024–2025	→ Hull City (loan)	30	(0)
2025–2026	Racing Santander	36	(3)
2026–	Olympiacos	7	(0)

International career^{‡}
2021–2023	Colombia U20	30	(5)
2025–	Colombia	14	(1)
Medal record
Men's football
Representing Colombia
South American Games
Bronze medal – third place	2022 Asunción	Team
South American U-20 Championship
Third place	2023 Colombia
- * Club domestic league appearances and goals as of 8 November 2026 ‡ National team caps and goals as of 6 October 2026

Gustavo Adolfo Puerta Molano (born 23 July 2003) is a Colombian professional footballer who plays as a central midfielder for Super League Greece club Olympiacos and the Colombia national team.

Puerta began his professional career in the Categoría Primera B with Bogotá in 2021. In January 2023 he joined Bundesliga club Bayer Leverkusen, who loaned him to 1. FC Nürnberg before recalling him for the 2023–24 season, in which he was part of the squad that won the club's first Bundesliga title without losing a league match. He spent 2024–25 on loan at EFL Championship club Hull City, where his appearances triggered a permanent transfer that was blocked by a registration embargo on the club. He joined Segunda División club Racing Santander in 2025 and helped them win the 2025–26 Segunda División title and promotion to La Liga, before moving to Olympiacos in September 2026 for a reported €16 million, a record fee for a Greek club.

At youth level, Puerta captained Colombia to third place at the 2023 South American U-20 Championship and to the quarter-finals of the 2023 FIFA U-20 World Cup. He made his senior debut for Colombia in 2025, scoring on his first appearance, and represented the nation at the 2026 FIFA World Cup.

== Early life ==
Puerta was born on 23 July 2003 in La Victoria, a municipality in the north of the Valle del Cauca, where his parents run a small shop from the family home; they raised money through raffles to pay his bus fares to training. From the age of ten to sixteen he played for the amateur side Supercampeones, before joining the Talentos Gustavo Victoria academy in Tuluá, where his coaches worked on his weight, having been nicknamed el gordito ("the chubby one") as a boy.

== Club career ==
=== Bogotá ===
Puerta signed his first professional contract with Primera B club Bogotá in June 2021 and made his debut on 25 July 2021. Converted from a number 10 into a box-to-box midfielder, he made 34 league appearances and scored three goals for the club. A move to Santa Fe under coach Martín Cardetti did not materialise, with reports differing over whether the Bogotá club had turned him down after a trial.

=== Bayer Leverkusen ===
On 31 January 2023, Puerta joined Bundesliga club Bayer Leverkusen on a contract until 2028 for a reported fee of €2 million, which equalled the record for a player sold directly from the Colombian second division to Europe. He was immediately loaned to 2. Bundesliga club 1. FC Nürnberg, but did not play a competitive match for them; Leverkusen used a recall clause in June 2023, citing his lack of playing prospects during Nürnberg's fight against relegation and his absence at the U-20 World Cup.

Under Xabi Alonso, Puerta made his Bundesliga debut as an 88th-minute substitute in a 3–0 win at Borussia Mönchengladbach on 26 August 2023, and his UEFA Europa League debut in a 5–1 home win over Qarabağ on 26 October. He made ten appearances across the two competitions as Leverkusen won the 2023–24 Bundesliga unbeaten, becoming the third Colombian to win the Bundesliga and the first to do so with a club other than Bayern Munich.

=== Loan to Hull City ===
On 27 August 2024, Puerta joined EFL Championship club Hull City on a season-long loan with an option to buy. He made his debut on 20 October 2024, starting in a 1–0 home defeat to Sunderland. His first goal for Hull came in the 80th minute of an FA Cup third-round tie against Doncaster Rovers on 12 January 2025, which finished 1–1 before Doncaster won on penalties. On 12 March, his late shot against Oxford United deflected in off goalkeeper Jamie Cumming for the winner in a 2–1 victory, although he was sent off in stoppage time after a second yellow card for simulation. In April 2025, his 27th league appearance triggered a clause in the loan agreement that made the move permanent from 1 July. On the final day of the season, his corner set up Matt Crooks's equaliser in a 1–1 draw at Portsmouth that confirmed Hull's survival in the Championship. A transfer embargo imposed on Hull by the English Football League prevented the club from registering him, and he returned to Leverkusen for the start of the 2025–26 season.

=== Racing Santander ===
On 1 September 2025, Puerta joined Segunda División club Racing Santander on a contract until June 2029. Six days later he scored on his debut, heading the winner from a Michelin free kick in the 75th minute of a 3–2 comeback victory away to Almería. A regular in José Alberto's midfield, he was named the club's player of the month for December 2025. Racing secured promotion to La Liga with a 4–1 win over Real Valladolid on 16 May 2026, ending a 14-year absence from the top flight, and clinched the 2025–26 Segunda División title on the final day after Puerta had left to join Colombia's World Cup preparations. He made his La Liga debut in a 2–2 home draw with Villarreal on 16 August 2026, the first of three league appearances before his departure.

=== Olympiacos ===
On 1 September 2026, Racing announced that Super League Greece club Olympiacos had paid Puerta's release clause, reported as €16 million, with total costs of around €20 million; the contract runs until 2030, and the fee was reported as the highest paid by a Greek club. He scored on his debut on 8 September, finishing a move set up by Armando González in the 68th minute of a 3–2 win over Volos in the Greek Football Cup.

== International career ==
=== Youth ===
Puerta captained Colombia at the 2023 South American U-20 Championship, held in Colombia, playing every minute until a suspension ruled him out against Argentina. He scored against Brazil in a 1–1 group-stage draw in Cali and against Paraguay in a 3–0 win in the final round, as Colombia finished third and qualified for the U-20 World Cup. At the 2023 FIFA U-20 World Cup in Argentina, he scored the winner as captain in Colombia's 2–1 opening win over Israel, and the team reached the quarter-finals, where they lost 3–1 to Italy.

=== Senior ===
Néstor Lorenzo first included Puerta in a senior training camp in 2022, and he made his debut on 15 November 2025, scoring in the opening minutes of a 2–1 friendly win over New Zealand in Fort Lauderdale before being substituted to an ovation. On 25 May 2026 he was named in Colombia's 26-man squad for the 2026 FIFA World Cup. He started Colombia's opening match, a 3–1 win over Uzbekistan at the Estadio Azteca, providing an assist for Luis Díaz, and partnered Jefferson Lerma in midfield in the 1–0 win over DR Congo that secured qualification for the knockout stage. Colombia topped their group and beat Ghana 1–0 in the round of 32, after which FIFA described him as a key part of Lorenzo's side, before being eliminated on penalties by Switzerland in the round of 16 on 7 July.

== Style of play ==
Puerta is a central midfielder who began as a number 10 before developing into a two-way player in a deeper role, combining defensive work with playmaking and a powerful long-range shot. At the 2026 World Cup he completed 92 per cent of his passes and 88.3 per cent in the final third, carried the ball 94 times, with seven of those carries ending in a shot or chance, the most in Colombia's squad, and applied 61 more pressures than any of his teammates.

== Career statistics ==
=== Club ===
As of match played 20 September 2026

Appearances and goals by club, season and competition
Club	Season	League			National cup (Note: Includes Copa Colombia, DFB-Pokal, FA Cup, Copa del Rey, Greek Football Cup)		Continental		Total	
Club	Season	Division	Apps	Goals	Apps	Goals	Apps	Goals	Apps	Goals
Bogotá	2021	Categoría Primera B	11	0	0	0	—		11	0
Bogotá	2022	Categoría Primera B	23	3	1	0	—		24	3
Bogotá	Total		34	3	1	0	—		35	3
Bayer Leverkusen	2022–23	Bundesliga	0	0	0	0	0	0	0	0
Bayer Leverkusen	2023–24	Bundesliga	7	0	0	0	3 (Note: Appearances in the UEFA Europa League)	0	10	0
Bayer Leverkusen	Total		7	0	0	0	3	0	10	0
1. FC Nürnberg (loan)	2022–23	2. Bundesliga	0	0	0	0	—		0	0
Hull City (loan)	2024–25	Championship	30	0	1	1	—		31	1
Racing Santander	2025–26	Segunda División	33	3	1	0	—		34	3
Racing Santander	2026–27	La Liga	3	0	0	0	—		3	0
Racing Santander	Total		36	3	1	0	—		37	3
Olympiacos	2026–27	Super League Greece	2	0	1	1	1 (Note: Appearance in the UEFA Europa League)	0	4	1
Career total			109	6	4	2	4	0	117	8

=== International ===
As of match played 6 October 2026

Appearances and goals by national team and year
National team	Year	Apps	Goals
Colombia	2025	2	1
Colombia	2026	12	0
Total		14	1

Scores and results list Colombia's goal tally first.

List of international goals scored by Gustavo Puerta
No.	Date	Venue	Opponent	Score	Result	Competition
1	15 November 2025	Inter Miami CF Stadium, Fort Lauderdale, United States	New Zealand	1–0	2–1	Friendly

== Honours ==
Bayer Leverkusen

- Bundesliga: 2023–24

Racing Santander

- Segunda División: 2025–26

Colombia U20

- South American U-20 Championship third place: 2023
- South American Games bronze medal: 2022
