= Spyros Vlachos =

Greek footballer

Personal information
- Full name: Spyridon Vlachos
- Date of birth: 19 January 1996 (age 30)
- Place of birth: Athens, Greece
- Height: 1.89 m (6 ft 2 in)
- Position: Centre-back

Team information
- Current team: Hellas Syros
- Number: 21

Youth career
- –2015: Apollon Smyrnis
- 2015–2016: Atromitos

Senior career*
Years	Team	Apps	(Gls)
2016–2017	Fostiras		
2017–2018	Aiginiakos	26	(0)
2018–2019	Sparta	9	(0)
2019	Apollon Pontus	11	(0)
2019–2020	Karaiskakis	16	(0)
2020–2022	Egaleo	46	(0)
2023–2024	Athens Kallithea	24	(0)
2024–2025	Niki Volos	20	(0)
2025–	Hellas Syros	28	(1)
- * Club domestic league appearances and goals as of 19 September 2026

Spyros Vlachos (Greek: Σπύρος Βλάχος; born 19 January 1996) is a Greek professional footballer who plays as a centre-back for Super League 2 club Hellas Syros.

== Career ==
Born in Athens, Vlachos came through the academy at Atromitos before turning professional with Fostiras. After early stints with Aiginiakos, Sparta, Apollon Pontus, Karaiskakis, Vlachos spent two-and-a-half years at Egaleo, making a total of 46 appearances in Super League 2.

In January 2023, Vlachos joined Athens Kallithea FC.
