= Antonis Papasavvas =

Greek football player

Personal information
- Full name: Antonios Papasavvas
- Date of birth: March 20, 1995 (age 31)
- Place of birth: Arta, Greece
- Height: 1.85 m (6 ft 1 in)
- Position: Midfielder

Team information
- Current team: Hellas Syros
- Number: 6

Youth career
- 2011–2013: Olympiacos

Senior career*
Years	Team	Apps	(Gls)
2013–2014	Olympiacos	0	(0)
2015	Tyrnavos	11	(1)
2015–2016	Asteras Vari		
2016–2017	Triglia Rafinas		
2017–2018	Acharnaikos	2	(0)
2018–2019	Egaleo		
2019–2020	Panthiraikos	18	(1)
2020–2024	A.E. Kifisia	66	(3)
2024–2025	Iraklis	12	(0)
2026	Ilioupoli	11	(0)
2026–	Hellas Syros	1	(0)

International career
2013	Greece U18	1	(0)
2013	Greece U19	1	(0)
- * Club domestic league appearances and goals as of 19 September 2026

Antonis Papasavvas (Greek: Αντώνης Παπασάββας; born 20 March 1995) is a Greek professional footballer who plays as a midfielder for Super League 2 club Hellas Syros.

== Career ==
Antonis Papasavvas' first team was Keravnos Thesprotikou. Ηis transfer to Olympiacos was made when he was 13 years old, making him a product of the Olympiacos youth system. Papasavvas made his debut with the first team on 30 October 2013 in a Greek Football Cup (Greek: Κύπελλο Ελλάδος Ποδοσφαίρου) away match against Fokikos F.C. as a substitute in the 46th minute. He managed to score with a powerful shot from outside the penalty area in the 86th minute. Papasavvas was released from Olympiacos the following summer.

On 30 August 2017, he signed for Acharnaikos.
