= Athanasios Koutsogoulas =

Greek footballer

Personal information
- Date of birth: 3 April 2004 (age 22)
- Place of birth: Athens, Greece
- Height: 1.84 m (6 ft 0 in)
- Position: Right-back

Team information
- Current team: Olympiacos B
- Number: 72

Youth career
- 2021–2024: Olympiacos

Senior career*
Years	Team	Apps	(Gls)
2024–	Olympiacos	0	(0)
2024–2025	→ Panserraikos (loan)	12	(0)
2025–	Olympiacos B	24	(0)

International career^{‡}
2024–	Greece U21	14	(0)
- * Club domestic league appearances and goals as of 20 September 2026 ‡ National team caps and goals as of 26 September 2026

Athanasios Koutsogoulas (Greek: Αθανάσιος Κουτσογούλας, born 3 April 2004) is a Greek professional footballer who plays as a right-back for Super League 2 club Olympiacos B.

He has represented Greece at youth level and was part of the Olympiacos U19 team that competed in and won the 2023–24 UEFA Youth League.

== Career ==
Athanasios Koutsogoulas came through the youth system of Olympiacos. Operating primarily as a right-back or right midfielder, he progressed through the club's development ranks, establishing himself as a key player and team captain for Olympiacos U19. During the 2023–24 season, Koutsogoulas played a pivotal role, as captain, in the UEFA Youth League, where Olympiacos secured a historical title—becoming the first Greek club to win a European competition at any level.

On 26 July 2024, he joined Super League club Panserraikos on a loan from Olympiacos until the end of the season.

Following his loan spell at Panserraikos, he returned to Olympiacos and featured for Olympiacos B in Super League 2.

Koutsogoulas made his first-team debut during the 2026–27 Greek Cup in an away match against AEL in Larissa.

== Honours ==
Olympiacos Youth

- UEFA Youth League: 2023–24
