= Giannis Sourdis =

Greek footballer

Personal information
- Full name: Ioannis Sourdis
- Date of birth: 29 September 2001 (age 25)
- Place of birth: Athens, Greece
- Height: 1.91 m (6 ft 3 in)
- Position: Goalkeeper

Team information
- Current team: Hellas Syros
- Number: 55

Youth career
- 2013–2017: Panathinaikos
- 2017–2018: Watford
- 2018–2019: Udinese

Senior career*
Years	Team	Apps	(Gls)
2019–2021	Udinese	0	(0)
2019–2020	→ Cjarlins Muzane (loan)	28	(0)
2020–2021	→ Rimini (loan)	0	(0)
2021	→ Cjarlins Muzane (loan)	12	(0)
2021–2024	Panathinaikos B	5	(0)
2024–2025	Lamia	1	(0)
2025–2026	Levadiakos	0	(0)
2026–	Hellas Syros	0	(0)

International career^{‡}
2019	Greece U18	2	(0)
- * Club domestic league appearances and goals as of 16 June 2025 ‡ National team caps and goals as of 5 June 2019

Giannis Sourdis (Greek: Γιάννης Σουρδής; born 29 September 2001) is a Greek professional footballer who plays as a goalkeeper for Super League 2 club Hellas Syros.
