= Matías González (footballer, born 1992) =

Uruguayan footballer

Personal information
- Full name: Matías González Laicovsky
- Date of birth: 20 February 1992 (age 34)
- Place of birth: Uruguay
- Position: Defender

Youth career
- 2007–2008: Durazno
- 2008–2009: Crucero del Norte

Senior career*
Years	Team	Apps	(Gls)
2009	Rocha	8	(0)
2012	Atenas	11	(1)
2014	Torque	10	(0)
- * Club domestic league appearances and goals

Matías González Laicovsky (born 20 February 1992) is a Uruguayan footballer who plays as a defender. He is currently a free agent.

== Career ==
González had youth spells with Durazno in Uruguay and Crucero del Norte in Argentina between 2007 and 2009. In 2009, González joined Uruguayan Segunda División side Rocha. He subsequently made eight professional appearances for the club. In 2012, González scored one goal in eleven matches for Atenas in the Segunda División. During the 2013–14 campaign, González joined his third second tier team in Torque. He made his debut on 5 April 2014 in a 6–0 victory versus Progreso. Nine appearances later, he left Torque.

== Career statistics ==
As of 26 January 2018.

Club statistics
Club	Season	League			Cup		League Cup		Continental		Other		Total	
Club	Season	Division	Apps	Goals	Apps	Goals	Apps	Goals	Apps	Goals	Apps	Goals	Apps	Goals
Rocha	2009–10	Segunda División	8	0	—		—		—		0	0	8	0
Atenas	2011–12	Segunda División	11	1	—		—		—		0	0	11	1
Torque	2013–14	Segunda División	10	0	—		—		—		0	0	10	0
Career total			29	1	—		—		—		0	0	29	1
