= Matías González (football manager) =

Uruguayan footballer and manager (born 1980)

Personal information
- Full name: Nelson Matías González Huelmo
- Date of birth: 15 October 1980 (age 46)
- Place of birth: Rocha, Uruguay
- Position: Defender

Senior career*
Years	Team	Apps	(Gls)
2006	Rocha	5	(0)

Managerial career
- Plaza Congreso
- Lavalleja
- 2014–2015: Rocha Academy
- 2015–2016: Rocha
- * Club domestic league appearances and goals as of 22:52, 26 January 2018 (UTC)

Nelson Matías González Huelmo (born 15 October 1980) is a Uruguayan football manager and former professional footballer.

== Career ==
He had a playing career with Rocha, playing in the Uruguayan Primera División throughout 2006. In December 2014, after managing Plaza Congreso and Lavalleja, González was made manager of Rocha's academy. In November 2015, González became manager of Rocha's first-team. He replaced Fabio Castromán who was sacked following a 2–0 defeat to Canadian. He made his managerial debut in a 4–3 Uruguayan Segunda División win over Oriental. He achieved four more wins but it wasn't enough as the club were relegated to the Uruguayan Segunda División Amateur. He subsequently left and was replaced by Neri Machado.

== Career statistics ==
As of 26 January 2018.

Managerial record by team and tenure
Team	From	To	Record					Ref
Team	From	To	P	W	D	L	Win %	Ref
Rocha	25 November 2015	5 June 2016	16	5	5	6	31.3	
Total			16	5	5	6	31.3	—
