= Matías González (footballer, born 1993) =

Uruguayan footballer

Personal information
- Full name: Robert Matías González Núñez
- Date of birth: 23 November 1993 (age 32)
- Place of birth: Montevideo, Uruguay
- Height: 1.86 m (6 ft 1 in)
- Position: Defender

Team information
- Current team: Atenas
- Number: 22

Senior career*
| Years | Team | Apps | (Gls) |
| 2013–2014 | Liverpool | 1 | (0) |
| 2014–2018 | El Tanque Sisley | 41 | (3) |
| 2018–2020 | San Marcos | 70 | (11) |
| 2021–2022 | Rangers | 18 | (4) |
| 2022–2023 | Progreso | 17 | (4) |
| 2023 | Unión Huaral | 12 | (2) |
| 2023 | Cerrito | 9 | (0) |
| 2024 | Sud América | 21 | (4) |
| 2025–2026 | Colón | 18 | (0) |
| 2026– | Atenas | 0 | (0) |
- * Club domestic league appearances and goals as of 19 March 2026

Robert Matías González Núñez (born 23 November 1993) is a Uruguayan footballer who plays as a defender for Uruguayan Segunda División side Atenas.

== Career ==
González's career began in 2013 with Liverpool of the Uruguayan Primera División. His one and only first-team appearance for Liverpool came on 24 February 2013 in a league loss versus Danubio. In August 2014, González completed a transfer to fellow Primera División side El Tanque Sisley, with whom he made his debut for in November 2014 against River Plate. Six further appearances arrived during 2014–15, prior to another six in 2015–16 which concluded with relegation for the club but it did feature González scoring his first senior goal in a 5–6 home defeat to Defensor Sporting.

In the Uruguayan Segunda División, González played four times as the club won promotion back to the top-flight for 2017. In 2017, he had his most productive season with El Tanque Sisley after featuring twenty-four times and scoring twice as they finished 13th. However, El Tanque Sisley were relegated at the beginning of 2018 due to outstanding debt issues, González subsequently departed the club and joined Primera B de Chile side San Marcos. His debut for San Marcos came on 4 March during a defeat to Deportes Valdivia.

== Career statistics ==
As of 20 May 2018.

Club statistics
| Club | Season | League | | | Cup (Note: Includes the Copa Chile) | | League Cup | | Continental (Note: Includes the Copa Sudamericana) | | Other | | Total | |
| Club | Season | Division | Apps | Goals | Apps | Goals | Apps | Goals | Apps | Goals | Apps | Goals | Apps | Goals |
|---|---|---|---|---|---|---|---|---|---|---|---|---|---|---|
| Liverpool | 2012–13 | Primera División | 1 | 0 | — | | — | | 0 | 0 | 0 | 0 | 1 | 0 |
| Liverpool | 2013–14 | Primera División | 0 | 0 | — | | — | | — | | 0 | 0 | 0 | 0 |
| Liverpool | Total | | 1 | 0 | — | | — | | 0 | 0 | 0 | 0 | 1 | 0 |
| El Tanque Sisley | 2014–15 | Primera División | 7 | 0 | — | | — | | — | | 0 | 0 | 7 | 0 |
| El Tanque Sisley | 2015–16 | Primera División | 6 | 1 | — | | — | | — | | 0 | 0 | 6 | 1 |
| El Tanque Sisley | 2016 | Segunda División | 4 | 0 | — | | — | | — | | 0 | 0 | 4 | 0 |
| El Tanque Sisley | 2017 | Primera División | 24 | 2 | — | | — | | — | | 0 | 0 | 24 | 2 |
| El Tanque Sisley | Total | | 41 | 3 | — | | — | | — | | 0 | 0 | 41 | 3 |
| San Marcos | 2018 | Primera B de Chile | 8 | 1 | 2 | 0 | — | | — | | 0 | 0 | 10 | 1 |
| Career total | | | 50 | 4 | 2 | 0 | — | | 0 | 0 | 0 | 0 | 52 | 4 |

== Honours ==
El Tanque Sisley

- Segunda División: 2016
