= Konstantinos Papageorgiou =

Greek footballer (born 1995)

Personal information
- Date of birth: 13 July 1995 (age 31)
- Place of birth: Edessa, Greece
- Height: 1.75 m (5 ft 9 in)
- Position: Central midfielder

Team information
- Current team: AEL
- Number: 8

Youth career
- –2012: Edessaikos
- 2012–2015: Veria

Senior career*
Years	Team	Apps	(Gls)
2015–2016	Veria	0	(0)
2016–2019	Edessaikos	72	(5)
2019–2021	Trikala	49	(1)
2021–2025	AEL	97	(16)
2025–2026	Panionios	21	(6)
2026–	AEL	3	(0)
- * Club domestic league appearances and goals as of 21 September 2026

Konstantinos Papageorgiou (Greek: Κωνσταντίνος Παπαγεωργίου; born 13 July 1995) is a Greek professional footballer who plays as a midfielder for Super League 2 club AEL.

== Career ==
Papageorgiou joined AEL in 2021.

== Career stats ==
As of 24 November 2025

Club	Season	League			Cup		Continental		Other		Total	
Club	Season	Division	Apps	Goals	Apps	Goals	Apps	Goals	Apps	Goals	Apps	Goals
Trikala	2019–20	Superleague Greece 2	23	1	6	1	—		—		29	2
Trikala	2020–21	Superleague Greece 2	26	0	0	0	—		—		26	0
Trikala	Total		49	1	6	1	—		—		55	2
AEL	2021–22	Superleague Greece 2	29	0	4	0	—		—		33	0
AEL	2022–23	Superleague Greece 2	26	5	2	1	—		—		28	6
AEL	2023–24	Superleague Greece 2	27	10	2	0	—		—		29	10
AEL	2024–25	Superleague Greece 2	15	1	3	0	—		—		18	1
AEL	Total		97	16	11	1	—		—		108	17
Career total			146	17	17	2	0	0	0	0	163	19
