= Zinedin Smajlović =

Bosnian footballer (born 2003)

- Smajlović with Sweden U21 in 2023

Personal information
- Date of birth: 20 December 2003 (age 22)
- Place of birth: Stockholm, Sweden
- Height: 1.91 m (6 ft 3 in)
- Position: Centre-back

Team information
- Current team: Olympiacos
- Number: 4

Youth career
- AIK
- 2019: FC Djursholm
- 2020: IFK Stocksund
- 2021: IK Frej
- 2022: IF Brommapojkarna

Senior career*
Years	Team	Apps	(Gls)
2023	Täby FK	13	(5)
2023–2024	Lecce	0	(0)
2024	→ Lecco (loan)	0	(0)
2024	Sandvikens	10	(2)
2025–2026	Sandefjord	26	(2)
2026–	Olympiacos	3	(0)

International career^{‡}
2023	Sweden U21	3	(0)
2026–	Bosnia and Herzegovina	4	(0)
- * Club domestic league appearances and goals as of 25 October 2026 ‡ National team caps and goals as of 17 November 2026

Zinedin Smajlović (pronounced [zinědin smǎjloʋitɕ]; born 20 December 2003) is a professional footballer who plays as a centre-back for Super League Greece club Olympiacos. Born in Sweden, he plays for the Bosnia and Herzegovina national team.

A former Swedish youth international, Smajlović made his senior international debut for Bosnia and Herzegovina in 2026.

== Club career ==
=== Early career ===
Smajlović started playing footbal at his hometown club AIK, before moving on to other team's youth setups. He made his professional debut playing for Täby FK against Piteå IF on 2 April 2023 at the age of 19. On 15 April, he scored his first professional goal in a triumph over IF Sylvia.

In July 2023, he moved to Italian side Lecce, which loaned him to Lecco.

=== Olmypiacos ===
In July 2026, Smajlović was transferred to Greek outfit Olympiacos for an undisclosed fee. He made his official debut for the team in a UEFA Champions League qualifier against NEC on 4 August. Three weeks later, he made his league debut against Atromitos.

== International career ==
Despite representing Sweden at the under-21 level, Smajlović decided to play for Bosnia and Herzegovina at the senior level.

In September 2026, he received his first senior call up, for 2026–27 UEFA Nations League B games against Poland, Romania and Sweden. He debuted against Poland on 25 September.

== Personal life ==
Smajlović is a practising Muslim; together with international teammates Sead Kolašinac, Amar Memić, Tarik Muharemović, Haris Tabaković, Nail Omerović, Salko Hamzić, Nihad Mujakić, Samed Baždar and Ermin Mahmić he visited a mosque in Ilidža during the national team's concentration.

== Career statistics ==
=== Club ===
As of match played 28 October 2026

Appearances and goals by club, season and competition
Club	Season	League			National cup (Note: Includes Norwegian Cup, Greek Cup)		Continental		Total	
Club	Season	Division	Apps	Goals	Apps	Goals	Apps	Goals	Apps	Goals
Täby FK	2023	Ettan	13	5	–		–		13	5
Sandvikens	2024	Superettan	10	2	–		–		10	2
Sandefjord	2025	Eliteserien	26	2	3	0	–		29	2
Sandefjord	2026	Eliteserien	10	0	0	0	–		10	0
Sandefjord	Total		36	2	3	0	–		39	2
Olympiacos	2026–27	Super League Greece	3	0	3	0	2 (Note: Appearances in UEFA Champions League)	0	8	0
Career total			62	9	6	0	2	0	70	9

=== International ===
As of match played 17 November 2026

Appearances and goals by national team and year
National team	Year	Apps	Goals
Bosnia and Herzegovina
Bosnia and Herzegovina	2026	4	0
Total		4	0
