= Matías González (footballer, born 1994) =

Argentine footballer

Personal information
- Full name: Matías Nahuel González
- Date of birth: 20 July 1994 (age 32)
- Place of birth: Argentina
- Position: Defender

Senior career*
Years	Team	Apps	(Gls)
2014	Colegiales	1	(0)
2015–2018	Claypole	40	(0)
- * Club domestic league appearances and goals

Matías Nahuel González (born 20 July 1994) is an Argentine footballer who plays as a defender. He is currently a free agent.

== Career ==
Colegiales of Primera B Metropolitana were González's first senior career club, he joined them in 2014 and made his professional debut in May versus Villa Dálmine. In 2015, González completed a move to Primera D side Claypole. He subsequently made thirty-three appearances between 2015 and 2017. González departed Claypole in 2018.
