= Matías González (footballer, born 1990) =

Argentine footballer

Personal information
- Full name: Matías González
- Date of birth: 4 July 1990 (age 36)
- Place of birth: Santa Fe, Argentina
- Height: 1.74 m (5 ft 8 1/2 in)
- Position: Forward

Team information
- Current team: Atlético Camioneros

Senior career*
Years	Team	Apps	(Gls)
2012	Racing Club	0	(0)
2012–2013	Ferro Carril Oeste	2	(0)
2013–2014	El Porvenir	20	(1)
2015–2017	Ben Hur	56	(14)
2017–2018	San Telmo	6	(0)
2018–	Atlético Camioneros	0	(0)
- * Club domestic league appearances and goals as of 14:13, 8 September 2018 (UTC)

Matías González (born 4 July 1990) is an Argentine professional footballer who plays as a forward for Atlético Camioneros.

== Career ==
González began his senior career in 2012 with Racing Club of the Argentine Primera División, appearing on the first-team's bench once in June 2012 versus Vélez Sarsfield. He departed in the following August to sign for Ferro Carril Oeste in Primera B Nacional, with them he made his professional debut on 10 September in a goalless draw at home to Almirante Brown. One further appearance followed prior to González leaving Ferro to join El Porvenir at the conclusion of the 2012–13 campaign. He went onto play twenty times and score one goal for El Porvenir in Primera D.

In January 2015, González completed a move to Torneo Federal B's Ben Hur. He would leave almost three years later in November 2017, after scoring fourteen goals in fifty-six matches for Ben Hur. In November 2017, González returned to professional football with Primera B Metropolitana side San Telmo. His debut arrived on 14 March 2018 against Sacachispas. Atlético Camioneros of Torneo Federal A signed González in the following July.

== Career statistics ==
As of 8 September 2018.

Club statistics
Club	Season	League			Cup (Note: Includes the Copa Argentina)		League Cup		Continental		Other		Total	
Club	Season	Division	Apps	Goals	Apps	Goals	Apps	Goals	Apps	Goals	Apps	Goals	Apps	Goals
San Telmo	2017–18	Primera B Metropolitana	6	0	0	0	—		—		0	0	6	0
Atlético Camioneros	2018–19	Torneo Federal A	0	0	0	0	—		—		0	0	0	0
Career total			6	0	0	0	—		—		0	0	6	0
