= Dimitrios Stournaras =

Greek association football player (born 2001)

Personal information
- Date of birth: 30 May 2001 (age 25)
- Place of birth: Davleia, Greece
- Height: 1.90 m (6 ft 3 in)
- Position: Goalkeeper

Team information
- Current team: Olympiacos
- Number: 91

Youth career
- 2017–2020: Olympiacos

Senior career*
Years	Team	Apps	(Gls)
2020–2021	Panionios	14	(0)
2021–2024	Olympiacos B	23	(0)
2024–2026	Iraklis	38	(0)
2026–	Olympiacos	0	(0)
- * Club domestic league appearances and goals as of June 21, 2026

Dimitrios Stournaras (Greek: Δημήτριος Στουρνάρας; born 30 May 2001) is a Greek professional footballer who plays as a goalkeeper for Super League club Olympiacos.

== Career ==
On 3 August 2024, Stournaras signed a contract with Iraklis on a free transfer.

== Career statistics ==
As of 26 March 2026

Club	Season	League			Cup		Continental		Other		Total	
Club	Season	Division	Apps	Goals	Apps	Goals	Apps	Goals	Apps	Goals	Apps	Goals
Olympiacos B	2021–22	Superleague Greece 2	11	0	—		—		—		11	0
Olympiacos B	2022–23	Superleague Greece 2	10	0	—		—		—		10	0
Olympiacos B	2023–24	Superleague Greece 2	2	0	—		—		—		2	0
Olympiacos B	Total		23	0	—		—		—		23	0
Iraklis	2024–25	Superleague Greece 2	19	0	0	0	—		—		19	0
Iraklis	2025–26	Superleague Greece 2	19	0	1	0	—		—		20	0
Iraklis	Total		38	0	1	0	—		—		39	0
Career total			51	0	1	0	0	0	0	0	62	0
