= Armando González (footballer, born 2003) =

Mexican footballer (born 2003)

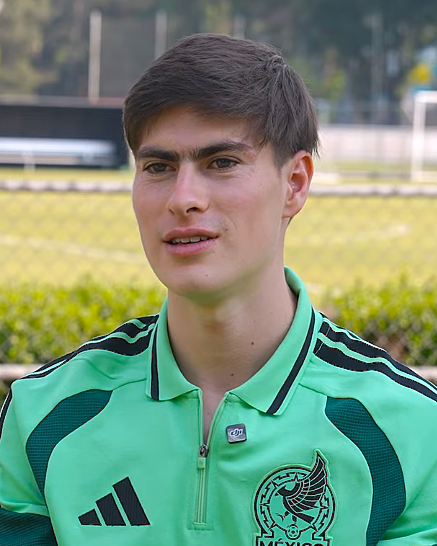
- González with Mexico in 2025

Personal information
- Full name: Armando González Alba
- Date of birth: 20 April 2003 (age 23)
- Place of birth: Celaya, Guanajuato, Mexico
- Height: 1.79 m (5 ft 10 in)
- Position: Forward

Team information
- Current team: Olympiacos
- Number: 34

Youth career
- Real Aguascalientes
- 2018–2024: Guadalajara

Senior career*
Years	Team	Apps	(Gls)
2020–2023	Tapatío	7	(0)
2024–2026	Guadalajara	59	(29)
2026–	Olympiacos	8	(2)

International career^{‡}
2025–	Mexico	12	(1)
- * Club domestic league appearances and goals as of 22 November 2026 ‡ National team caps and goals as of 17 November 2026

Armando González Alba (born 20 April 2003), nicknamed "La Hormiga" (lit. 'The Ant'), is a Mexican professional footballer who plays as a forward for Super League Greece club Olympiacos and the Mexico national team.

== Club career ==
=== Guadalajara ===
González made his professional debut with Guadalajara's reserve team Tapatío on 11 November 2020, coming on as a 89th-minute substitute against Pumas Tabasco.

González made his first team, and Liga MX debut on 13 January 2024 coming on as a 85th-minute substitute in a 1–1 draw against Santos Laguna. He finished his debut season with just 3 appearances and no goals.

González scored his first goal for Guadalajara in a match against Tijuana on 12 July 2024, where Guadalajara would go on to lose 2–4.

On 26 July 2025, González would score a brace against Atlético San Luis within the final minutes of the match, helping Chivas guarantee a 4–3 home victory. On 25 October, González would score his first career hat-trick against Clásico Tapatío rivals Atlas in a 4–1 win. He would go on to finish the Apertura tournament as the joint-top scorer with 12 goals, earning him the distinction of "Most Valuable Player."

On 14 March 2026, González scored a brace against Santos Laguna in a 3–0 home victory. On 5 April, he would score another brace, scoring a final minute penalty against Pumas to give his team a draw at 2–2. González finished as 2nd-top scorer of the Clausura tournament with 12 goals, being named "Most Valuable Player" once again.

=== Olympiacos ===
On 22 August 2026, González joined Olympiacos in the Super League Greece, becoming the third Mexican to join the club after Nery Castillo and Alan Pulido. He made his debut for the club on 30 August, in a match against Asteras Tripolis. On 2 September, he scored his first goal in that season's Greek Cup match against AEL, opening the scoreboard in a 4–0 away victory. Six days later, he scored a brace and contributed an assist in his club's 3–2 Greek Cup victory over Volos. On 16 September, on his UEFA Europa League debut, he scored his side's first goal for an eventual comeback of 2–1 against Polish club Jagiellonia Białystok.

== International career ==
González was called up to the senior Mexico team by manager Javier Aguirre in November 2025 for friendly matches against Uruguay and Paraguay set to be played on the 15 and 18 of November respectively. González made his debut appearance for Mexico on 18 November against Paraguay with his side losing the match 2–1. On 25 February 2026, González scored his debut goal with the national team against Iceland, the second in an eventual 4–0 win.

González was named in the 26-man squad for the 2026 FIFA World Cup, hosted on home soil. González only played fourteen minutes in Mexico's five games, only participating in the opening match against South Africa.

== Personal life ==
González is the son of former professional footballer Armando "Mandín" González Bejarano. According to his mother, Araceli Alba, González's nickname "Hormiga" (Spanish for "Ant") dates back to his early childhood, in which during a family gathering, his older siblings Emilio and Mariana accidentally stood on a red ant nest and were stung multiple times as a result, an incident that frightened a toddler-aged González, who witnessed it from his stroller. As he began learning to speak, he would say "yiyiga" whenever he saw an ant; his family eventually realized that "yiyiga" was his way for saying "hormiga" ("ant"), from which his lifelong nickname originated. He is also nicknamed by Mexican fans as "El Otaku del Gol" (Spanish for "The Goal's Otaku") as he's a well-known anime fan and has incorporated gestures from several series into his celebrations

Gonzalez is a Catholic, and during the 2026 FIFA World Cup he was seen, alongside teammates Mateo Chavez and Alvaro Fidalgo, kneeling and praying in front of an image of Our Lady of Guadalupe.

== Career statistics ==
=== Club ===
As of match played on 25 October 2026

Appearances and goals by club, season and competition
Club	Season	League			National cup (Note: Includes Greek Cup)		Continental		Other		Total	
Club	Season	Division	Apps	Goals	Apps	Goals	Apps	Goals	Apps	Goals	Apps	Goals
Tapatío	2020–21	Liga de Expansión MX	1	0	—		—		—		1	0
Tapatío	2021–22	Liga de Expansión MX	1	0	—		—		—		1	0
Tapatío	2022–23	Liga de Expansión MX	5	0	—		—		—		5	0
Tapatío	Total		7	0	—		—		—		7	0
Guadalajara	2023–24	Liga MX	3	0	—		1 (Note: Appearances in CONCACAF Champions Cup)	0	—		4	0
Guadalajara	2024–25	Liga MX	18	3	—		1	1	2 (Note: Appearances in Leagues Cup)	0	21	4
Guadalajara	2025–26	Liga MX	35	24	—		—		3	1	38	25
Guadalajara	2026–27	Liga MX	3	0	—		—		3	0	6	0
Guadalajara	Total		59	27	—		2	1	8	1	69	29
Olympiacos	2026–27	Super League Greece	7	1	2	3	4 (Note: Appearances in UEFA Europa League)	2	—		13	6
Career total			74	28	2	3	5	3	8	1	89	34

=== International ===
As of match played on 17 November 2026

Appearances and goals by national team and year
National team	Year	Apps	Goals
Mexico	2025	1	0
Mexico	2026	11	1
Total		12	1

Scores and results list Mexico's goal tally first, score column indicates score after each González goal.

List of international goals scored by Armando González
No.	Date	Venue	Opponent	Score	Result	Competition
1	25 February 2026	Estadio Corregidora, Querétaro, Mexico	Iceland	2–0	4–0	Friendly

== Honours ==
Individual

- Liga MX Golden Boot: Apertura 2025 (shared)
- Liga MX Player of the Month: October 2025, January 2026, March 2026
- Liga MX Most Valuable Player: Apertura 2025, Clausura 2026
- Liga MX Best XI: Apertura 2025, Clausura 2026
- Liga MX All-Star: 2026
