= La Victoria, Valle del Cauca =

La Victoria
- Municipality and town
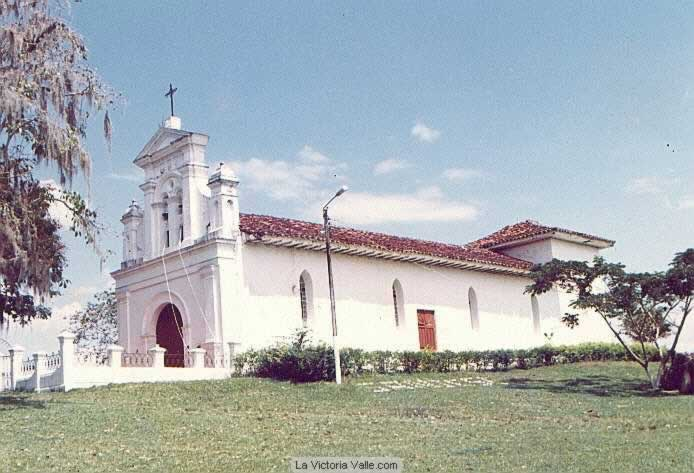

- Flag Coat of arms

- Location of the municipality and town of La Victoria, Valle del Cauca in the Valle del Cauca Department of Colombia.

- Location in Colombia
- Coordinates: 4°31′17″N 76°2′11″W
- Country: Colombia
- Department: Valle del Cauca Department

Area
  - Total: 276 km^{2} (107 sq mi)

Population (2015)
  - Total: 13,247
  - Density: 48.0/km^{2} (124/sq mi)
- Time zone: UTC-5 (Colombia Standard Time)
- Website: http://lavictoria-valle.gov.co

La Victoria is a town and municipality located in the Department of Valle del Cauca, Colombia, in the northern region. It is located in the right side of the Cauca River, in the valley between the western and central ranges.

The town was founded on August 12, 1835 under the name of 'La Cañada' (The Ravine in English), founded very close to a creek called 'Los Micos'. The village was after renamed as 'San José' in the current location of the corregimientos of Holguín and San José, where still exists the Sanctuary of San José, built in 1832. Looking for a better connection with other cities and towns, the village was moved closer to the Cauca River, where currently is located the municipal head. The village was enacted as munipality in December 23, 1850.
