= Hellas Syros F.C. =

Greek association football club

Hellas Syros
- Full name: Αθλητικός Προοδευτικός Όμιλος Ελλάς Σύρου - Ποδοσφαιρική Ανώνυμη Εταιρεία; Athletic Progressive Club Hellas Syros
- Founded: 1929; 97 years ago
- Ground: Municipal Stadium of Ermoupolis
- Capacity: 2,500
- Chairman: Giorgos Leontaritis
- Manager: Thanasis Staikos
- League: Super League Greece 2
- 2025–26: Super League Greece 2 (South Group), 5th
- Website: www.hellassyrou.gr
Home colours	Away colours

The Athletic Progressive Club Hellas Syros is a Greek football club based in Ermoupolis, Syros. It was founded in 1929 but was officially recognized as a club by the HFF in 1946 under the name "Progressive Association of Fans Hellas". Its official colors are blue and white, and its emblem is the Flag of Greece. It uses the Municipal Stadium of Ermoupolis as its home ground, which features artificial turf and a built grandstand with a capacity of 2,500 seats.

It currently operates a men's football department, while in the past it had sections for women's football, track and field, volleyball, and basketball. In the past, the men's football team has competed for three seasons in the Fourth National Division and two in the Gamma Ethniki. It currently competes in the second tier Super League Greece 2 under the name "Athletic Progressive Club Hellas Syros Football Public Limited Company" and the trade title "Hellas Syros P.A.E.".

== History ==
=== Foundation and early friendlies ===
The Progressive Association of Fans Ellas Syrou was founded in 1929 as a football club and in 1938 became an officially recognized association by the Court of First Instance with founding members: Leontaritis, Flytzanis, Korres, Rusonellos, Mouchtopoulos. After World War II, the team was first mentioned on 10 June 1946, when it drew 2-2 (0-2) in a friendly against A.O. Kifisias. The lineup was: Boumpoulis, Sikaropoulos, Syrigos, Skordis, Melanis, Chalkias, Baltas, Lignos, Xagoraris, Ventouris, Roussos.

In September 1946, it hosted the strong Ilysiakos from Athens, losing 1-5 despite taking the lead with a goal by Topakas. In November of the same year, it was officially accepted as a member of the HFF but not attached to any local association, although together with Aris Syrou it had requested to join the Aegean Union. As a result, Ellas (and Aris, which was not formalized) remained outside official football championships. The only official competition it entered was the Greek Cup.

In this period, the team played only friendly matches - as a single club or reinforced with players from other local clubs using the name “Syros Mixed team” - against various visiting teams from Athens or military selections. It also organized friendly tournaments, covering the hospitality costs of the guests. Since there was no public stadium, the club used the field of the Military Reserve Officers’ School, paying 10% of the ticket income, which often made hosting teams financially unfeasible. In 1947, the management petitioned the Ministry of Defense to allow free use of the pitch. However, the situation worsened; at times the field was completely unavailable, as on 26 October 1949, when their official Greek Cup match against Esperos Kallitheas was cancelled because the commander denied access.

=== Participation in the Greek Cup ===
In October 1949, Ellas Syrou entered the Greek Cup, becoming the first team from Syros to do so. Its debut match was scheduled for October 26, 1949, against Esperos Kallitheas, but was canceled when the Commander of the Military Reserve Officers’ School denied permission to use the field. The game was postponed until January 15, 1950, when Ellas Syrou hosted Esperos and lost 2–5 (1–2). The starting lineup was: Bouboulis, Melanis, Miliarakis, Skordis, Zolotas, Delaporia, Baltas, Chalkias, Lignos, Xagoraris, Topakas.

In 1950, Ellas Syrou faced A.O. Kifisias in the next edition, drawing 3–3 at home (goals by Topakas 2*, Xagoraris) and losing 1–4 away in the replay, thus being eliminated. In 1951, it hosted Panachaiki for the same competition, losing 1–3, with Xagoraris scoring Ellas's only goal.

These matches gave the island's team valuable experience against more established Athenian and Peloponnesian clubs and contributed to the spread of organized football in Syros.

=== Local Championships ===
In the early 1950s, Ellas Syrou played mostly friendly matches or local tournaments, as there was still no official football association for the Cyclades. In 1954, together with A.O. Aris Syrou, it co-founded the Football Union of the Aegean Island*, which organized regional tournaments including teams from Syros, Mykonos, and Naxos. Ellas Syrou was among the dominant clubs of the period, often finishing at or near the top of the standings.

In 1957, when the Cyclades Football Clubs Association (E.P.S. Kykladon) was established, Ellas Syrou was one of its **founding members**. However, due to financial difficulties and the limited means of transportation between the islands, the club often could not travel to away games, and in several seasons it withdrew or was inactive.

In the 1960s, the club reorganized and took part in several Cyclades Championships, frequently competing for the title with A.O. Mykonos, Panellinios Syrou, and Aris Syrou. The rivalry between Ellas and Aris in particular was the highlight of local football, filling the stands of the Municipal Stadium of Ermoupoli.

During the 1970s, Ellas Syrou alternated between good and weaker seasons but remained one of the most historic and respected clubs of the Cyclades. In 1978, the club temporarily suspended its activities due to administrative and financial problems.

=== Modern Era ===
In the 2000s, Ellas Syrou continued to participate regularly in the Cyclades Football Clubs Association (E.P.S. Kykladon) leagues. Despite occasional financial or administrative challenges, the club maintained a stable presence in local football and invested in the development of youth academies that supplied players to its senior team.

In 2007, Ellas reached another milestone by advancing to the Cyclades Cup Final, where it faced A.O. Mykonos, ultimately finishing as runner-up. Throughout that period, the team remained a key force on the island and was known for its disciplined and technically skilled style of play.

In the 2010s, under the leadership of President Giorgos Leontaritis, the club strengthened its organizational structure and facilities. The management placed emphasis on the revival of the club's historical identity and the improvement of its training conditions at the Municipal Stadium of Ermoupolis.

Ellas Syrou won the Cyclades Championship in 2017–18, which earned it promotion once again to the Fourth National Division (Delta Ethniki), a competition that was later merged into the Gamma Ethniki. In the 2023–24 season, the club competed in Gamma Ethniki (Group 3) and achieved 1st place, securing promotion to the Super League 2, the second tier of Greek football.

Since 2024, Ellas Syrou has been operating under the name “Athletic Progressive Club Ellas Syrou Football Public Limited Company” (P.A.E.), marking the club's return to professional football after many decades. Its home matches are still held at the Municipal Stadium of Ermoupolis, which features artificial turf and a seated grandstand with a capacity of 2,500 spectators.

== Honours ==
=== National ===
- Gamma Ethniki
  - Winners (1): 2024–25

=== Regional ===
- Cyclades FCA First Division
  - Winners (6): 1986–87, 1990–91, 1994–95, 2006–07, 2021–22, 2022–23
- Cyclades FCA Cup
  - Winners (2): 1995–96, 2024–25

== Players ==
=== Current squad ===
As of 25 September 2026

Note: Flags indicate national team as defined under FIFA eligibility rules; some limited exceptions apply. Players may hold more than one non-FIFA nationality.

No.	Pos.	Nation	Player
3	DF	GRE	Zacharias Venakis
4	DF	GRE	Georgios Gogos
6	MF	GRE	Antonis Papasavvas
7	FW	GRE	Markos Nino
8	MF	GRE	Orestis Kreci
9	FW	ALB	Emiljano Bullari
10	MF	GRE	Vasilios Tsiantoulas
11	MF	GHA	King Faisal
14	FW	GRE	Georgios Gemistos
17	MF	GRE	Aristidis Andrikopoulos
18	MF	GRE	Christos Prevezianos
19	DF	ALB	Demir Zahi
20	MF	GRE	Panagiotis Kalyvas

No.	Pos.	Nation	Player
21	DF	GRE	Spyros Vlachos (captain)
22	DF	GRE	Stefanos Zafiris
25	DF	ARG	Tiago Andino
27	DF	GRE	Spyros Kostopoulos
28	FW	BRA	Felipe Felicio
29	MF	GRE	Paris Babis
30	MF	GRE	Garabet Takesian
44	GK	GRE	Ilias Karargyris
47	MF	GRE	Christos Paleologou
55	GK	GRE	Giannis Sourdis
67	DF	GRE	Apostolos Diamantis
74	DF	CYP	Nikos Koutsoudakis
99	FW	NGR	Oche Ochowechi
—	FW	EST	Alexandr Sapovalov

== Organization and Administration ==
Hellas Syros operates under the official legal form of a Football Public Limited Company (P.A.E.), with full administrative responsibilities for professional competitions, while still maintaining its amateur and youth divisions under the Athletic Progressive Club Ellas Syrou umbrella.

The club's headquarters and training facilities are located in Ermoupoli, and all home matches are played at the Municipal Stadium of Ermoupoli, which has a 2,500-seat capacity and features artificial turf.

Management emphasizes historical preservation, local talent development, and community engagement, ensuring that the club remains a central part of Syros’ sports culture.
