= Markos Nino =

Greek footballer (born 2002)

Personal information
- Date of birth: 3 November 2002 (age 23)
- Place of birth: Athens, Greece
- Height: 1.83 m (6 ft 0 in)
- Positions: Winger; attacking midfielder

Team information
- Current team: Hellas Syros
- Number: 7

Youth career
- 2018–2020: Panionios

Senior career*
Years	Team	Apps	(Gls)
2020–2021	Panionios	4	(1)
2021–2024	AEL	48	(4)
2024–2025	AEK Athens B	19	(2)
2025–2026	AEK Athens	0	(0)
2025–2026	→ Hellas Syros (loan)	15	(1)
2026–	Hellas Syros	3	(2)
- * Club domestic league appearances and goals as of 19 September 2026

Markos Nino (Greek: Μάρκος Νίνο; born 3 November 2002) is a Greek professional footballer who plays as a winger for Super League 2 club Hellas Syros.
