= Joel Roca =

Spanish footballer

Personal information
- Full name: Joel Roca Casals
- Date of birth: 7 June 2005 (age 21)
- Place of birth: Camprodon, Spain
- Height: 1.76 m (5 ft 9 in)
- Position: Winger

Team information
- Current team: Olympiacos
- Number: 73

Youth career
- 2014–2016: Campodron
- 2016–2019: Barcelona
- 2019–2021: Girona

Senior career*
Years	Team	Apps	(Gls)
2021–2024	Girona B	24	(3)
2022–2026	Girona	36	(2)
2024–2025	→ Mirandés (loan)	38	(6)
2026–	Olympiacos	9	(2)

International career^{‡}
2021–2022	Spain U17	10	(6)
2022–2024	Spain U19	5	(1)
2025	Spain U20	3	(0)
2025–	Spain U21	4	(2)
2025–	Catalonia	1	(1)
- * Club domestic league appearances and goals as of 22 November 2026 ‡ National team caps and goals as of 31 March 2026

Joel Roca Casals (born 7 June 2005) is a Spanish professional footballer who plays as a left winger for Super League Greece club Olympiacos.

== Club career ==
Born in Camprodon, Girona, Catalonia, Roca began playing football in his hometown UE Campodron, where he was a top goalscorer. He moved to the youth academy of FC Barcelona in 2016, and then to Girona FC's youth sides in 2019. In September 2021 at the age of 16, he debuted for the latter's reserves in the Tercera División RFEF, jumping up four youth categories in three years. On 3 June 2022, he extended his contract with the club keeping him until 2026.

Roca made his professional – and La Liga – debut with Girona on 26 August 2022, coming on as a late substitute in a 1–0 loss to RC Celta de Vigo. In August 2023, shortly after recovering from a biceps femoris muscle injury, he suffered a serious knee injury which kept him sidelined for the entire 2023–24 season.

On 20 August 2024, after fully recovering, Roca was loaned to Segunda División side CD Mirandés for one year. He scored his first professional goal on 6 December, netting the equalizer in a 2–1 home win over Levante UD.

On 3 July 2025, after being regularly used for the Jabatos as they narrowly missed out promotion in the play-offs, Roca renewed his contract with Girona until 2029. He scored his first goal in the top tier on 15 August, netting his side's only in a 3–1 home loss to Rayo Vallecano.

On 18 July 2026, Roca signed for Greek club Olympiacos.

== International career ==
Roca is a youth international for Spain, having played for the under-19 level. He was named in the under-20 squad for the 2025 FIFA U-20 World Cup in Chile.

He debuted with the Catalonia team in a friendly 2–1 win over Palestine on 18 November 2025.

== Playing style ==
Roca is a winger most well known for his goalscoring ability and direct style of play. Although comparably small in height, he is noted for his pace and verticality in transition.

== Career statistics ==
As of match played 23 May 2026

Appearances and goals by club, season and competition
Club	Season	League			Cup		Europe		Other		Total	
Club	Season	Division	Apps	Goals	Apps	Goals	Apps	Goals	Apps	Goals	Apps	Goals
Girona B	2021–22	Tercera Federación	13	0	—		—		—		13	0
Girona B	2022–23	Tercera Federación	11	3	—		—		—		11	3
Girona B	Total		24	3	—		—		—		24	3
Girona	2022–23	La Liga	5	0	0	0	—		—		5	0
Girona	2025–26	La Liga	31	2	1	0	—		—		32	2
Girona	Total		36	2	1	0	0	0	—		37	2
Mirandés (loan)	2024–25	Segunda División	38	6	1	0	—		4 (Note: Appearances in La Liga play-offs)	0	43	6
Olympiacos	2026–27	Super League Greece	0	0	0	0	2	0	—		2	0
Career total			98	11	2	0	2	0	4	0	105	11
