= Bruno Onyemaechi =

Nigerian footballer (born 1999)

Personal information
- Full name: Sopuruchukwu Bruno Onyemaechi
- Date of birth: 3 April 1999 (age 27)
- Place of birth: Owerri, Nigeria
- Height: 1.84 m (6 ft 0 in)
- Position: Left-back

Team information
- Current team: Olympiacos
- Number: 70

Youth career
- 2018: Lillestrøm
- 2018–2020: Feirense

Senior career*
Years	Team	Apps	(Gls)
2020–2023	Feirense	29	(2)
2020–2021	→ Vila Real (loan)	16	(1)
2022–2023	→ Boavista (loan)	29	(1)
2023–2025	Boavista	42	(3)
2025–	Olympiacos	30	(0)

International career^{‡}
2023–	Nigeria	33	(0)
Medal record
Men's football
Representing Nigeria
Africa Cup of Nations
Runner-up	2023 Ivory Coast
Third place	2025 Morocco
- * Club domestic league appearances and goals as of 22 November 2026 ‡ National team caps and goals as of 17 November 2026

Sopuruchukwu Bruno Onyemaechi MON (//; born 3 April 1999) is a Nigerian footballer who plays as a left-back for Super League Greece club Olympiacos and the Nigeria national team.

== Club career ==
In the winter of 2018, Onyemaechi was trialled by clubs in Norway, which used player agent Atta Aneke. Onyemaechi was first on trial with Stabæk, then Lillestrøm together with compatriot Jerome Philip. Onyemaechi was brought to Lillestrøm's Marbella training camp and played friendly games, but ended up not being signed.

=== Boavista ===
On 17 August 2022, Onyemaechi joined Boavista on a season-long loan with an option to buy. In June 2023, Boavista triggered the option and signed him on a permanent deal.

=== Olympiacos ===
In 2025, Onyemaechi joined Olympiacos.

== International career ==
On 10 September 2023, Onyemaechi made his international debut for Nigeria, playing as a left-back for the full 90 minutes of a 6–0 victory over São Tomé and Príncipe, in the final group match of the 2023 Africa Cup of Nations qualifiers. Nigeria qualified and went all the way to the finals, where they lost 1–2 to Ivory Coast.

On 11 December 2025, Bruno Onyemaechi was selected to be part of Nigeria's squad for the Africa Cup of Nations 2025 event in Morocco, where he achieved a bronze medal.

== Career statistics ==
=== Club ===
As of match played 27 January 2025

Appearances and goals by club, season and competition
Club	Season	League			National cup		League cup		Continental		Other		Total	
Club	Season	Division	Apps	Goals	Apps	Goals	Apps	Goals	Apps	Goals	Apps	Goals	Apps	Goals
Feirense	2020–21	Liga Portugal 2	0	0	0	0	0	0	—		—		0	0
Feirense	2021–22	Liga Portugal 2	27	2	2	0	0	0	—		—		29	2
Feirense	2022–23	Liga Portugal 2	2	0	0	0	0	0	—		—		2	0
Feirense	Total		29	2	2	0	0	0	—		—		31	2
Vila Real (loan)	2020–21	Campeonato de Portugal	16	1	0	0	—		—		—		16	1
Boavista (loan)	2022–23	Primeira Liga	29	1	1	0	3	1	—		—		33	2
Boavista	2023–24	Primeira Liga	24	0	2	0	0	0	—		—		26	0
Boavista	2024–25	Primeira Liga	18	3	0	0	0	0	—		—		18	3
Boavista	Total		71	4	3	0	3	1	—		—		77	5
Olympiacos	2024–25	Super League Greece	9	0	3	0	—		1	0	—		14	0
Olympiacos	2025–26	Super League Greece	9	0	3	0	—		3	0	0	0	15	0
Olympiacos	Total		18	0	6	0	—		4	0	0	0	28	0
Career total			131	7	11	0	3	1	2	0	0	0	148	8

=== International ===
As of match played 17 November 2026

Appearances and goals by national team and year
National team	Year	Apps	Goals
Nigeria	2023	5	0
Nigeria	2024	6	0
Nigeria	2025	12	0
Nigeria	2026	10	0
Total		33	0

== Honours ==
Olympiacos

- Super League Greece: 2024–25
- Greek Football Cup: 2024–25

Nigeria

- Africa Cup of Nations runner-up: 2023; third place: 2025

Orders

- Member of the Order of the Niger
