= Balša Popović =

Montenegrin footballer

Personal information
- Full name: Balša Popović
- Date of birth: 10 June 2000 (age 26)
- Place of birth: Kotor, FR Yugoslavia
- Height: 1.94 m (6 ft 4 in)
- Position: Goalkeeper

Team information
- Current team: Olympiacos
- Number: 31

Youth career
- Mogren
- 2017–2018: Grbalj

Senior career*
Years	Team	Apps	(Gls)
2018–2021	Grbalj	46	(0)
2018–2019	→ Arsenal Tivat (loan)	4	(0)
2022–2023	Kolubara	10	(0)
2023–2025	OFK Beograd	71	(0)
2025–2026	Red Star Belgrade	0	(0)
2025–2026	→ OFK Beograd (loan)	34	(0)
2026–	Olympiacos	0	(0)

International career^{‡}
2016–2017	Montenegro U17	5	(0)
2017	Montenegro U18	2	(0)
2017–2019	Montenegro U19	12	(0)
2021	Montenegro U21	3	(0)
2025–	Montenegro	9	(0)
- * Club domestic league appearances and goals as of 20:36, 6 June 2026 (UTC) ‡ National team caps and goals as of 13:13, 13 November 2026 (UTC)

Balša Popović (Montenegrin Cyrillic: Балша Поповић; born 10 June 2000) is a Montenegrin professional footballer who plays as a goalkeeper for Super League Greece club Olympiacos.

== Club career ==
Popović began his career at Mogren in Budva before joining Grbalj Radanovići, where he spent several seasons across the Montenegrin First Football League and the second division, making over 40 appearances for the club. He subsequently moved to Serbia, joining Kolubara where he spent two seasons in the Serbian SuperLiga.

In August 2023, Popović joined OFK Beograd and quickly established himself as first choice, keeping 12 clean sheets in 34 appearances as the club won the Prva Liga title in 2023–24 and earned promotion to the Serbian SuperLiga. He went on to play all 37 league matches in OFK Beograd's debut Superliga season in 2024–25, serving as club captain, and was named the best goalkeeper in the Serbian SuperLiga at the end of the season.

In the summer of 2025, Red Star Belgrade signed Popović. He remained at OFK Beograd on loan for the 2025–26 season.

== International career ==
Popović made his senior debut for the Montenegro national football team on 25 March 2025, starting in a 2026 World Cup qualifying fixture against the Faroe Islands, a match Montenegro won 1–0. Coach Robert Prosinečki confirmed the decision to start Popović had been planned in advance as part of a rotation between his two goalkeepers.

== Personal life ==
Popović has spoken of his unusual path to becoming a goalkeeper — having started as a striker before moving to centre-back and eventually settling between the posts. His father Saša Popović is a former goalkeeping coach who worked alongside Ljubiša Tumbaković in China, and his brother Stefan is also a goalkeeper at Mornar.

== Honours ==
OFK Beograd

- Serbian First League: 2023–24
