= Antonis Papakanellos =

Greek footballer

Personal information
- Full name: Antonios Papakanellos
- Date of birth: 11 August 2005 (age 21)
- Place of birth: Greece
- Height: 1.86 m (6 ft 1 in)
- Positions: Attacking midfielder; winger

Team information
- Current team: Asteras Tripolis (on loan from Olympiacos)
- Number: 44

Youth career
- 2019–2024: Olympiacos

Senior career*
Years	Team	Apps	(Gls)
2023–2024	Olympiacos B	15	(1)
2024–	Olympiacos	7	(0)
2025–2026	→ Rio Ave (loan)	21	(0)
2026–	→ Asteras Tripolis (loan)	5	(1)

International career^{‡}
2021–2022	Greece U17	2	(0)
2023–2024	Greece U19	8	(0)
2024–	Greece U21	11	(1)
- * Club domestic league appearances and goals as of 13 September 2026 ‡ National team caps and goals as of 26 September 2026

Antonis Papakanellos (born 11 August 2005) is a Greek professional footballer who plays as an attacking midfielder or a winger for Super League club Asteras Tripolis, on loan from Olympiacos. He has represented Greece at youth level and was part of the Olympiacos U19 team that competed in and won the 2023–24 UEFA Youth League.

== Career ==
Papakanellos came through the youth system of Olympiacos and made his debut with Olympiacos B in Super League Greece 2. In July 2025, he joined Portuguese side Rio Ave F.C. on a season-long loan from Olympiacos.

== Honours ==
Olympiacos Youth

- UEFA Youth League: 2023–24

Olympiacos

- Super League Greece: 2024–25
- Greek Football Cup: 2024–25
