= Doron Leidner =

Israeli association footballer (born 2002)

Personal information
- Date of birth: 26 April 2002 (age 24)
- Place of birth: Rishon LeZion, Israel
- Height: 1.78 m (5 ft 10 in)
- Position: Left wing-back

Team information
- Current team: Hapoel Tel Aviv
- Number: 16

Youth career
- 2010–2017: Maccabi Tel Aviv
- 2017: Maccabi Petah Tikva
- 2017–2020: Hapoel Tel Aviv

Senior career*
Years	Team	Apps	(Gls)
2020–2022	Hapoel Tel Aviv	53	(1)
2022–2024	Olympiacos B	10	(0)
2022–2026	Olympiacos	0	(0)
2023	→ Austria Wien (loan)	10	(1)
2024–2025	→ Zürich (loan)	5	(0)
2025–2026	→ Hapoel Tel Aviv (loan)	23	(0)
2026–	Hapoel Tel Aviv	0	(0)

International career^{‡}
2018	Israel U17	2	(1)
2019	Israel U18	4	(0)
2021–2024	Israel U21	9	(1)
2022–	Israel	8	(0)
- * Club domestic league appearances and goals as of 31 May 2026 ‡ National team caps and goals as of 10 September 2024

Doron Leidner (Hebrew: דורון ליידנר; born 26 April 2002) is an Israeli professional footballer who plays as a left wing-back for Israeli Premier League club Hapoel Tel Aviv and the Israel national team.

== Early and personal life ==
Leidner was born and raised in Rishon LeZion, Israel, to an Israeli family of Ashkenazi Jewish (Romanian-Jewish) descent.

He also holds a Romanian passport, on account of his Ashkenazi Jewish ancestors, which eases the move to certain European football leagues.

== Club career ==
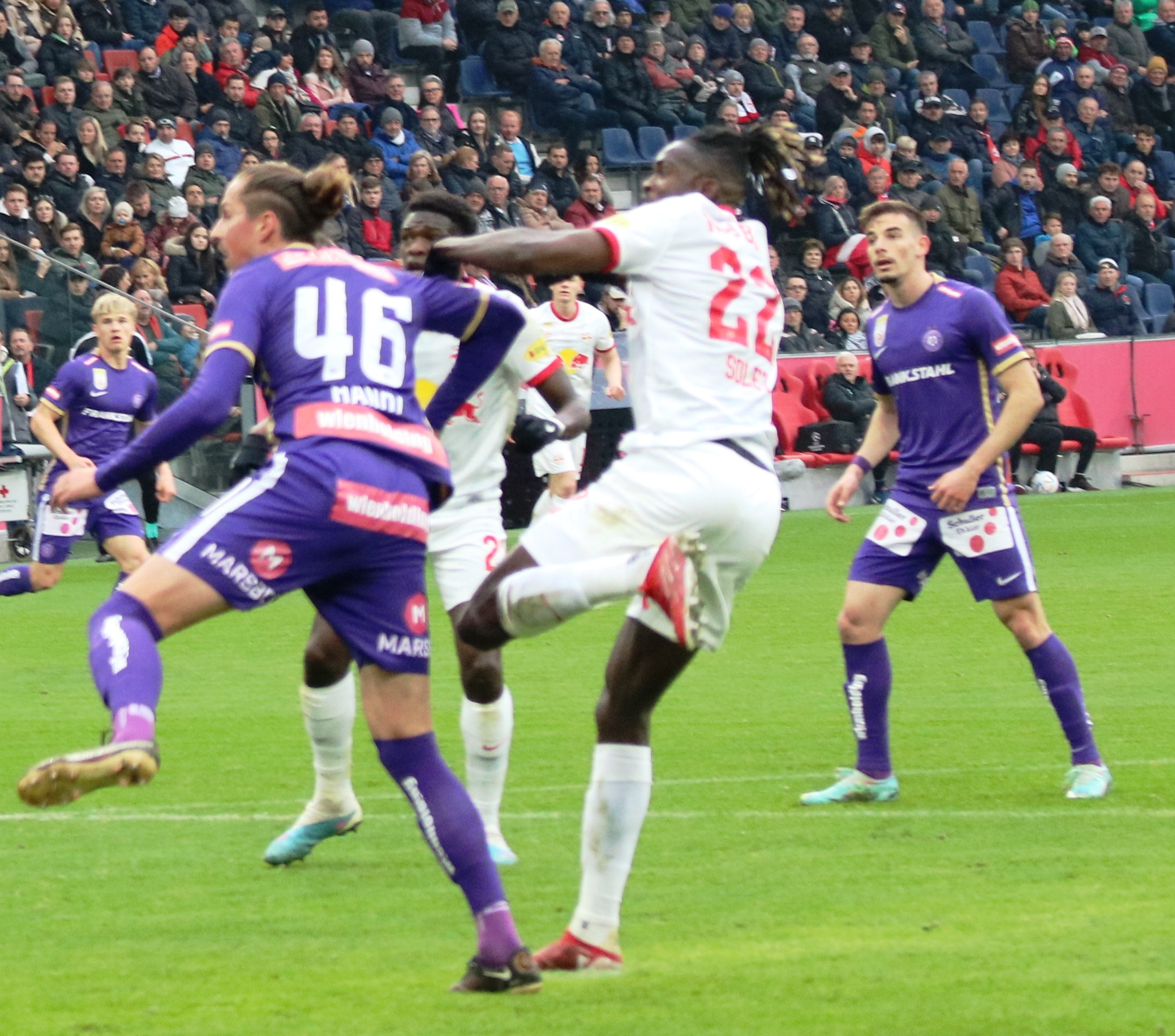
Leidner (right) playing for Austria Wien in 2023

On 29 July 2022, Leidner signed a four-year deal with Greek Super League club Olympiacos for a fee of €2 million. On 18 January 2023, Leidner was loaned to Austrian Bundesliga side Austria Wien until the end of the season. On 28 May 2023, Leidner picked up an injury in a 3–1 league defeat to LASK. On 2 June, it was reported that he had torn his cruciate ligament and would return to Athens to undergo surgery.

== International career ==
From 2018, until 2024, Leidner has been part of Israel at youth international level, respectively has been part of the U17, U18 and U21 teams and he with these teams played fifteen matches and scored two goals.

He was first called up to the Israeli senior side on 5 November 2021. He made his senior debut with the Israel senior side on 2 June 2022, opening in a 2022–23 UEFA Nations League match against Iceland that ended in a 2–2 home draw, where Leidner assisted the second equalizing goal in the 84th minute.

== Career statistics ==
=== Club ===
As of match played 10 February 2026

Appearances and goals by club, season and competition
Club	Season	League			National cup (Note: Includes State Cup, Swiss Cup)		League cup (Note: Includes Toto Cup)		Europe		Other		Total	
Club	Season	Division	Apps	Goals	Apps	Goals	Apps	Goals	Apps	Goals	Apps	Goals	Apps	Goals
Hapoel Tel Aviv	2019–20	Israeli Premier League	10	0	1	0	0	0	—		—		11	0
Hapoel Tel Aviv	2020–21	Israeli Premier League	17	0	3	0	4	0	—		—		24	0
Hapoel Tel Aviv	2021–22	Israeli Premier League	26	1	0	0	5	0	—		—		31	1
Hapoel Tel Aviv	Total		53	1	4	0	9	0	–		—		66	1
Olympiacos B	2023–24	Super League Greece 2	2	0	—		—		—		7 (Note: Appearances in Super League Greece 2 Play-out)	0	9	0
Austria Wien (loan)	2022–23	Austrian Bundesliga	10	1	—		—		—		—		10	1
Zürich (loan)	2024–25	Swiss Super League	4	0	1	0	—		0	0	—		5	0
Hapoel Tel Aviv (loan)	2025–26	Israeli Premier League	12	0	0	0	—		—		—		12	0
Career total			81	2	5	0	9	0	0	0	7	0	102	2

=== International ===
As of 28 March 2023

Appearances and goals by national team and year
National team	Year	Apps	Goals
Israel	2022	6	0
Israel	2023	2	0
Total		8	0

== See also ==
- List of Jewish footballers
- List of Jews in sports
- List of Israelis
