= Theocharis Tsingaras =

Greek footballer

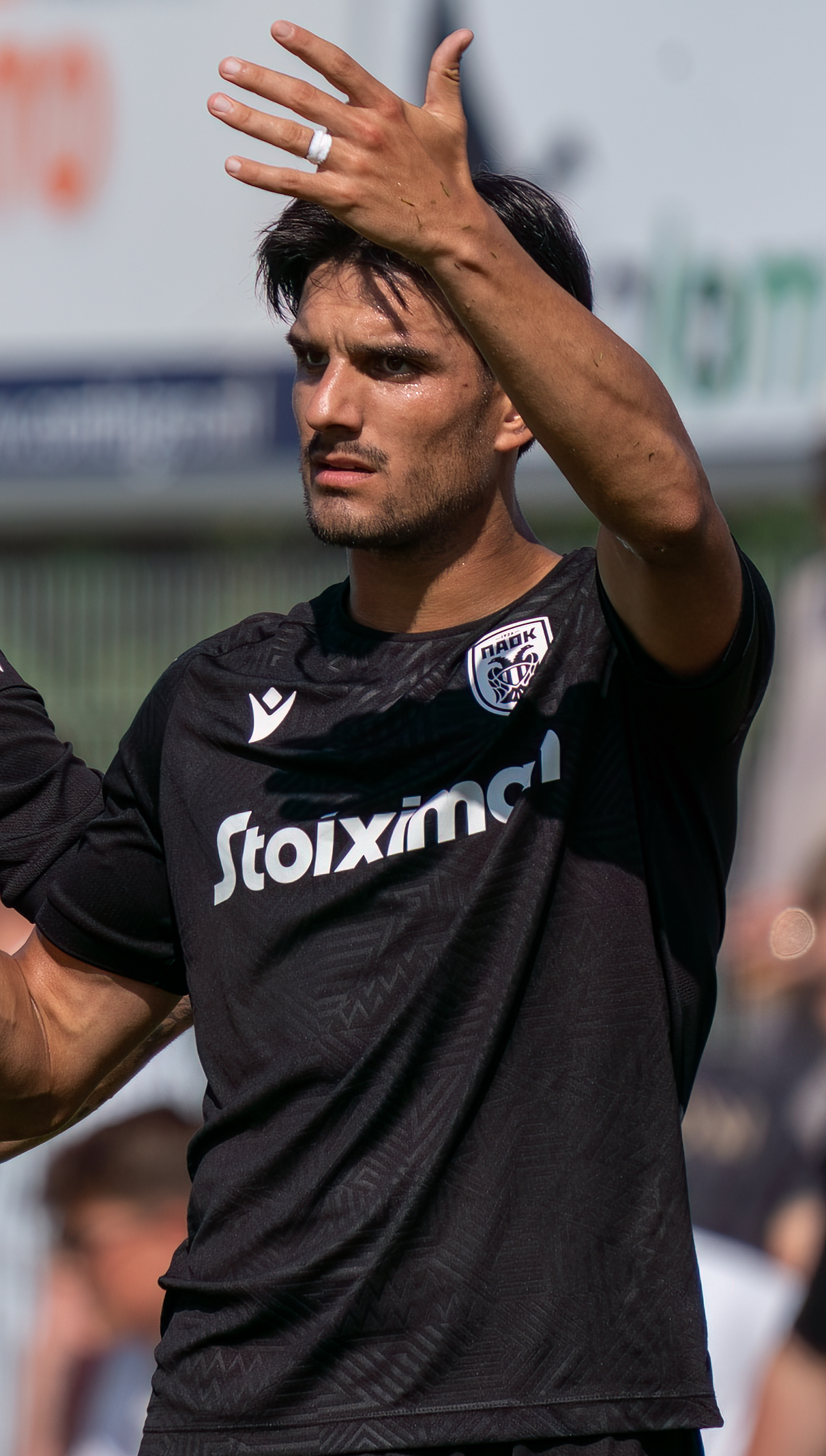
- Tsingaras with PAOK in 2023

Personal information
- Full name: Theocharis Tsingaras
- Date of birth: 20 August 2000 (age 26)
- Place of birth: Portaria, Chalkidiki, Greece
- Height: 1.75 m (5 ft 9 in)
- Position: Midfielder

Team information
- Current team: Atromitos
- Number: 5

Youth career
- 2010–2020: PAOK

Senior career*
Years	Team	Apps	(Gls)
2019–2024	PAOK	48	(1)
2022–2023	→ Toulouse (loan)	1	(0)
2024–	Atromitos	65	(2)

International career^{‡}
2017	Greece U17	2	(0)
2020–2022	Greece U21	14	(0)
2024	Greece	1	(0)
- * Club domestic league appearances and goals as of 20 October 2026 ‡ National team caps and goals as of 11 June 2024

Theocharis Tsingaras (Greek: Θεοχάρης Τσιγγάρας; born 20 August 2000) is a Greek professional footballer who plays as a midfielder for Super League club Atromitos and the Greece national team.

== Club career ==
=== Early career ===
As a child, Tsingaras thought of the journey as a normal everyday part of his life. "It was tedious and I did not always find the time I wanted to study, but I stole some hours to read on the bus from home to school", he recalled. The busy and stressful training program never stopped him from being consistent at school. Always a good student, he also enrolled in the School of Management, Economics and Communication. Since joining PAOK in 2010, Tsingaras, born on 20 August 2000, opted to make the PAOK Academy house his home after years of clocking up the kilometers with his road trips.

Tsiggaras is a defensive midfielder who contributes to his team in both defence and attack. He was part of the Under-15 title-winning side in the 2014–15 season, won the championship with the Under-17s in the 2015–16 season, and won the title with the Under-19s in three consecutive seasons (2017–18, 2018–19, 2019–20). He also featured in UEFA Youth League campaigns and has represented Greece at various youth levels.

=== PAOK ===
In the summer of 2019, he joined up with the first team squad for pre-season training, and played in the friendly against PEC Zwolle, and continued to work with consistency and patience, but also with an obvious development, which did not go unnoticed by former coach Abel Ferreira during the 2020 pre-season. He played for the senior side for the first time in June 2020 against Aris, coming off the bench in the 86th minute. Some details on the procedure separate Theocharis Tsingaras from the renewal of his contract with PAOK, something that was now considered certain that will happen. According to a LiveSport article, the two sides have talked and agreed on the 20-year-old midfielder staying in Toumba, and only the signatures remain. However, the details of the deal are not yet known. The matter is expected to be closed immediately and the young midfielder will be invited to sign his new contract and everything shows that he will get some opportunities from Abel Ferreira.

=== Atromitos ===
On 26 August 2024, Tsingaras joined Atromitos.

== International career ==
Tsingaras made his debut for the Greece national team on 11 June 2024 in a friendly against Malta in Grödig, Austria. He substituted Manolis Saliakas in the 81st minute, Greece won 2–0.

== Personal life ==
Tsingaras' older brother, Angelos, is also a professional footballer.

== Career statistics ==
=== Club ===
As of match played 15 May 2026

Appearances and goals by club, season and competition
Club	Season	League			National cup (Note: Includes Greek Football Cup, Coupe de France)		Europe		Total	
Club	Season	Division	Apps	Goals	Apps	Goals	Apps	Goals	Apps	Goals
PAOK	2019–20	Super League Greece	2	0	0	0	—		2	0
PAOK	2020–21	Super League Greece	16	0	5	1	4 (Note: Appearances in UEFA Europa League)	0	25	1
PAOK	2021–22	Super League Greece	19	0	2	0	7 (Note: Appearances in UEFA Conference League)	0	28	0
PAOK	2023–24	Super League Greece	11	1	4	0	10	0	25	1
PAOK	2024–25	Super League Greece	—		—		1 (Note: Appearance in UEFA Champions League)	0	1	0
PAOK	Total		48	1	11	1	22	0	81	2
PAOK B	2021–22	Super League Greece 2	2	0	—		—		2	0
Toulouse (loan)	2022–23	Ligue 1	1	0	3	0	—		4	0
Toulouse B (loan)	2022–23	National 3	2	0	—		—		2	0
Atromitos	2024–25	Super League Greece	28	1	2	0	—		30	1
Atromitos	2025–26	Super League Greece	31	1	5	0	—		36	1
Atromitos	Total		59	2	7	0	—|		66	2
Career total			112	2	21	1	22	0	155	4

== Honours ==
=== PAOK ===
- Super League Greece: 2023–24
- Greek Cup: 2018–19, 2020–21

=== Toulouse ===
- Coupe de France: 2022–23
