= Stefanos Tzimas =

Greek footballer (born 2006)

Personal information
- Full name: Stefanos Tzimas
- Date of birth: 6 January 2006 (age 20)
- Place of birth: Thessaloniki, Greece
- Height: 1.84 m (6 ft 0 in)
- Position: Striker

Team information
- Current team: Brighton & Hove Albion
- Number: 9

Youth career
- 2013–2022: PAOK

Senior career*
| Years | Team | Apps | (Gls) |
| 2022–2023 | PAOK B | 10 | (7) |
| 2023–2025 | PAOK | 20 | (4) |
| 2024–2025 | → 1. FC Nürnberg (loan) | 17 | (10) |
| 2025 | 1. FC Nürnberg | 0 | (0) |
| 2025– | Brighton & Hove Albion | 9 | (1) |
| 2025 | → 1. FC Nürnberg (loan) | 6 | (2) |

International career^{‡}
| 2022 | Greece U16 | 3 | (3) |
| 2021–2023 | Greece U17 | 13 | (6) |
| 2023 | Greece U19 | 11 | (7) |
| 2024– | Greece U21 | 9 | (5) |
- * Club domestic league appearances and goals as of 3 December 2025 ‡ National team caps and goals as of 18 November 2025

Stefanos Tzimas (Greek: Στέφανος Τζίμας; born 6 January 2006) is a Greek professional footballer who plays as a striker for Premier League club Brighton & Hove Albion and the Greece under-21 national team.

== Career ==
=== PAOK ===
Tzimas joined the PAOK Academy in 2013, aged seven. On 10 January 2023, Tzimas made his PAOK debut, against Kalamata in the Greek Cup coming on for Diego Biseswar. On 25 February 2023, he made his league debut, against PAS Giannina coming on for Brandon Thomas. On 5 March 2023, he became PAOK record youngest goalscorer in the 6–0 win against Ionikos.

On 11 October 2023, he was named by English newspaper The Guardian as one of the best players born in 2006 worldwide. On 19 May 2024, Tzimas won the Greek Superleague with PAOK, totalling 23 apps (16 league apps) and 4 goals (3 league goals) in the 2023–24 season.

=== 1. FC Nürnberg ===
On 27 June 2024, Tzimas joined German 2. Bundesliga club 1. FC Nürnberg on a season-long loan deal.

On 3 February 2025, Nürnberg exercised their option to buy Tzimas' rights from PAOK, and transferred him to the English club Brighton & Hove Albion for £20.8m until 30 June 2030, while Brighton loaned him back to Nürnberg until the end of the 2024–25 season.

=== Brighton & Hove Albion ===
Tzimas joined Brighton ahead of the 2025–26 season, scoring a brace on his debut in a 6–0 away win over Oxford United in the EFL Cup. Two matchweeks later, Tzimas made his Premier League debut for the Seagulls in the second half in a loss to AFC Bournemouth. On the 30th November 2025, Tzimas scored his first goal for the Seagulls in the Premier League against Nottingham Forest in a 2–0 away win. On 3 December 2025, Tzimas suffered an anterior cruciate ligament (ACL) injury on his first Premier League start during the 4–3 loss against Aston Villa, ruling him out for the rest of the season.

== Career statistics ==
As of match played 3 December 2025

Appearances and goals by club, season and competition
| Club | Season | League | | | National cup (Note: Includes Greek Cup, DFB-Pokal) | | League cup (Note: Includes EFL Cup) | | Europe | | Total | |
| Club | Season | Division | Apps | Goals | Apps | Goals | Apps | Goals | Apps | Goals | Apps | Goals |
|---|---|---|---|---|---|---|---|---|---|---|---|---|
| PAOK B | 2022–23 | Super League Greece 2 | 9 | 6 | — | | — | | — | | 9 | 6 |
| PAOK B | 2023–24 | Super League Greece 2 | 1 | 1 | — | | — | | — | | 1 | 1 |
| PAOK B | Total | | 10 | 7 | — | | — | | — | | 10 | 7 |
| PAOK | 2022–23 | Super League Greece | 4 | 1 | 3 | 0 | — | | — | | 7 | 1 |
| PAOK | 2023–24 | Super League Greece | 16 | 3 | 3 | 1 | — | | 4 (Note: Appearances in UEFA Europa Conference League) | 0 | 23 | 4 |
| PAOK | Total | | 20 | 4 | 6 | 1 | — | | 4 | 0 | 30 | 5 |
| 1. FC Nürnberg (loan) | 2024–25 | 2. Bundesliga | 17 | 10 | 1 | 0 | — | | — | | 18 | 10 |
| Brighton & Hove Albion | 2024–25 | Premier League | 0 | 0 | 0 | 0 | — | | — | | 0 | 0 |
| Brighton & Hove Albion | 2025–26 | Premier League | 9 | 1 | 0 | 0 | 3 | 2 | — | | 12 | 3 |
| Brighton & Hove Albion | 2026–27 | Premier League | 0 | 0 | 0 | 0 | 0 | 0 | 0 | 0 | 0 | 0 |
| Brighton & Hove Albion | Total | | 9 | 1 | 1 | 0 | 3 | 2 | — | | 30 | 13 |
| 1. FC Nürnberg (loan) | 2024–25 | 2. Bundesliga | 6 | 2 | — | | — | | — | | 6 | 2 |
| Career total | | | 62 | 24 | 7 | 1 | 3 | 2 | 4 | 0 | 76 | 27 |

== Honours ==
PAOK

- Super League Greece: 2023–24

Individual

- PAOK record youngest goalscorer: 17 years, 1 month and 26 days (PAOK – Ionikos 6–0, 5 March 2023)
