= Kyriakos Giaxis =

Greek footballer

Personal information
- Date of birth: 3 April 2001 (age 25)
- Place of birth: Serres, Greece
- Height: 1.85 m (6 ft 1 in)
- Positions: Midfielder; defender

Youth career
- 2014–2016: Pigasos Serres
- 2016–2017: Panserraikos
- 2018–2021: PAOK

Senior career*
Years	Team	Apps	(Gls)
2017–2018	Panserraikos	12	(0)
2021–2024	PAOK B	56	(3)
2021–2024	PAOK	1	(0)
2024–2025	AEL	12	(0)
2025–2026	Anagennisi Karditsa	6	(0)
2026	Nestos Chrysoupoli	13	(0)

International career
2017	Greece U17	2	(0)
2018	Greece U18	1	(0)
2019	Greece U19	1	(0)
- * Club domestic league appearances and goals as of 26 April 2026

Kyriakos Giaxis (Greek: Κυριάκος Γιαξής; born 3 April 2001) is a Greek professional footballer who plays as a midfielder.

== Career ==
=== Early career ===
Giaxis joined PAOK in 2018 from Panserraikos. He was first included in the first-team squad on 3 March 2021, for the Greek Football Cup game against Lamia. A transfer from Panserraikos, Kyriakos Giaxis came to PAOK in 2018 with expectations to do well, given that he has already played for Serres in the Football League. He is a midfielder, excellent in both defense and attack, with a good technique and intelligence in his game. He also stands out for his maturity and perception. An Under-19 league champion, he was also a member of the senior squad that won the Greek Cup final in May 2021, and he is now a student in the School of Physical Education and Sports Science at Serres.

== Personal life ==
Giaxis hails from Tragilos, Serres.

== Career statistics ==
As of 4 August 2024

Club	Season	League			Cup		Continental		Other		Total	
Club	Season	Division	Apps	Goals	Apps	Goals	Apps	Goals	Apps	Goals	Apps	Goals
Panserraikos	2016–17	Superleague Greece 2	3	0	0	0	—		—		3	0
Panserraikos	2017–18	Superleague Greece 2	9	0	1	0	—		—		10	0
Panserraikos	Total		12	0	1	0	—		—		13	0
PAOK B	2021–22	Superleague Greece 2	15	0	—		—		—		15	0
PAOK B	2022–23	Superleague Greece 2	21	2	—		—		—		21	2
PAOK B	2023–24	Superleague Greece 2	29	1	—		—		—		29	1
PAOK B	Total		65	3	—		—		—		65	3
PAOK	2023–24	Superleague Greece	1	0	0	0	0	0	—		0	0
Career total			78	3	1	0	0	0	0	0	79	3

== Honours ==
PAOK

- Greek Cup: 2020–21
- Super League Greece: 2023–24

AEL

- Super League Greece 2: 2024–25 (North Group)
- Greek Super Cup Super League 2: 2024–25
