= Angelos Tsingaras =

Greek footballer

Personal information
- Date of birth: 24 July 1999 (age 27)
- Place of birth: Portaria, Chalkidiki, Greece
- Height: 1.73 m (5 ft 8 in)
- Position: Defensive midfielder

Team information
- Current team: AEL
- Number: 37

Youth career
- 2015–2018: Panetolikos

Senior career*
| Years | Team | Apps | (Gls) |
| 2018–2024 | Panetolikos | 107 | (0) |
| 2024–2025 | Vitesse | 26 | (0) |
| 2025 | Benevento | 1 | (0) |
| 2026 | Montana | 18 | (0) |
| 2026– | AEL | 3 | (0) |

International career^{‡}
| 2019–2020 | Greece U21 | 6 | (0) |
- * Club domestic league appearances and goals as of 21 September 2026 ‡ National team caps and goals as of 13 November 2020

Angelos Tsingaras (Greek: Άγγελος Τσιγγάρας; born 24 July 1999) is a Greek professional footballer who plays as a defensive midfielder for Super League 2 club AEL.

== Club career ==
On 23 August 2024, Tsingaras joined Vitesse in the Netherlands on a one-year contract with an option for a second year.

On 8 July 2025, Tsingaras signed a contract with Benevento in Italian third-tier Serie C for one season, with an option to extend for two additional seasons.

== Personal life ==
Tsingaras' younger brother, Theocharis, is also a professional footballer.

== Career statistics ==
=== Club ===
As of 21 May 2024

| Club | Season | League | | | Cup | | Continental | | Other | | Total | |
| Club | Season | Division | Apps | Goals | Apps | Goals | Apps | Goals | Apps | Goals | Apps | Goals |
|---|---|---|---|---|---|---|---|---|---|---|---|---|
| Panetolikos | 2018–19 | Super League Greece | 15 | 0 | 3 | 0 | — | | — | | 18 | 0 |
| Panetolikos | 2019–20 | Super League Greece | 23 | 0 | 5 | 0 | — | | — | | 28 | 0 |
| Panetolikos | 2020–21 | Super League Greece | 27 | 0 | 2 | 0 | — | | — | | 29 | 0 |
| Panetolikos | 2021–22 | Super League Greece | 19 | 0 | 5 | 0 | — | | — | | 24 | 0 |
| Panetolikos | 2022–23 | Super League Greece | 3 | 0 | 1 | 0 | — | | — | | 4 | 0 |
| Panetolikos | 2023–24 | Super League Greece | 20 | 0 | 6 | 0 | — | | — | | 26 | 0 |
| Panetolikos | Total | | 107 | 0 | 22 | 0 | 0 | 0 | — | | 129 | 0 |
| Career total | | | 107 | 0 | 22 | 0 | 0 | 0 | 0 | 0 | 129 | 0 |
