= Andrija Živković =

Serbian footballer

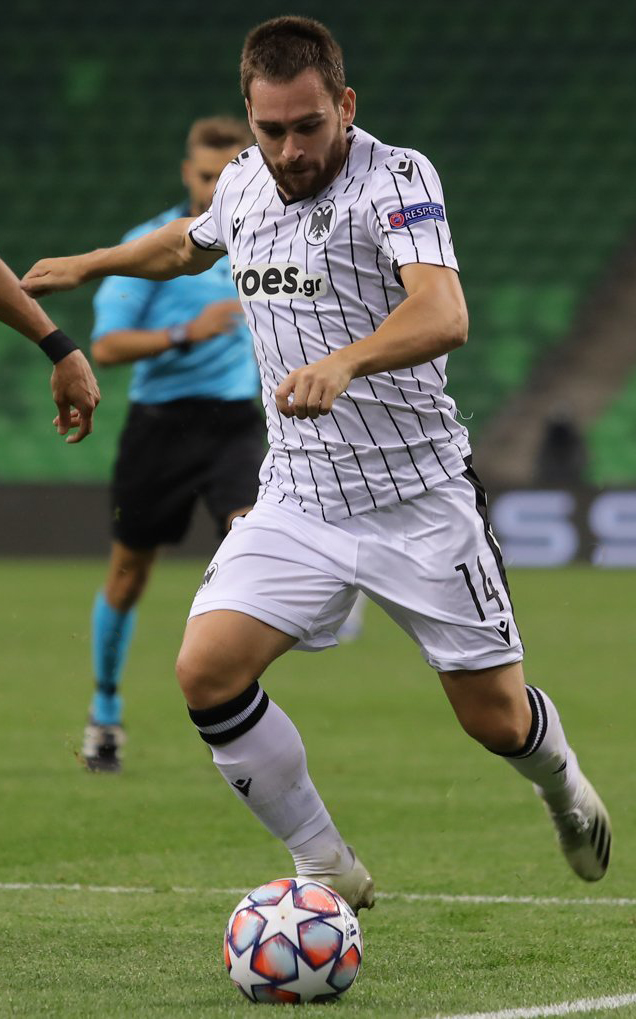
- Živković with PAOK in 2020

Personal information
- Full name: Andrija Živković
- Date of birth: 11 July 1996 (age 30)
- Place of birth: Niš, Serbia, FR Yugoslavia
- Height: 1.69 m (5 ft 7 in)
- Position: Winger

Team information
- Current team: PAOK
- Number: 14

Youth career
- Nacional Niš
- 2009–2013: Partizan

Senior career*
Years	Team	Apps	(Gls)
2013–2016	Partizan	63	(17)
2016–2020	Benfica	55	(3)
2020–	PAOK	185	(47)

International career^{‡}
2011–2013	Serbia U17 (Note: Only official UEFA matches included)	11	(4)
2014–2015	Serbia U19	8	(2)
2014–2015	Serbia U20	9	(2)
2013–2019	Serbia U21	15	(2)
2013–	Serbia	67	(2)
Medal record
Men's Football
Representing Serbia
FIFA U-20 World Cup
Gold medal – first place	2015 New Zealand	U-20 Team
- * Club domestic league appearances and goals as of 22 November 2026 ‡ National team caps and goals as of 13 November 2026

Andrija Živković (Serbian Cyrillic: Андрија Живковић, pronounced [ǎndrija ʒǐːʋkoʋitɕ]; born 11 July 1996) is a Serbian professional footballer who plays as a winger for Super League Greece club PAOK and the Serbia national team.

He is the youngest player ever to make a senior appearance for Serbia, as well as the youngest Partizan captain in the club's history.

Živković was a vital member of the Serbia national under-20 team that won the 2015 FIFA U-20 World Cup, scoring two goals and providing two assists.

== Club career ==
=== Partizan ===
Živković joined Partizan in September 2009. He was a member of the club's promising generation, alongside Danilo Pantić and Nemanja Radonjić, among others.

==== 2012–13 season ====
Živković made his competitive debut for their first team in a league fixture against Novi Pazar on 28 April 2013, replacing Darko Brašanac after 65 minutes of the match that ended in a goalless draw. That was his only appearance in the 2012–13 campaign, as the club won its sixth consecutive championship title.

==== 2013–14 season ====
After a long negotiation, Živković signed his first professional contract with Partizan on 23 August 2013, on a three-year deal. He scored his first competitive goal for the club only two days later, after coming on as a substitute for Nikola Ninković in a 5–1 home victory over Radnički Kragujevac. Afterwards, Živković scored a goal in the next three league games, in a 3–1 home win over Rad, in a 2–1 away win against Sloboda Užice, as well as in a 2–0 home victory over OFK Beograd.

On 4 March 2014, Živković became Partizan's youngest captain of all-time at 17 years, 7 months and 18 days. This honour was previously held by Nikola Ninković, who captained the team at 17 years, 10 months and 12 days. In his first full senior season, Živković made a total of 25 appearances in all competitions and scored five goals.

==== 2014–15 season ====
In his third senior season, Živković played regularly since the beginning of the campaign, despite being unable to score in any competition. He also appeared in five games of the UEFA Europa League group stage. After failing to find the back of the net for several months, he scored his first goal of the season in a 5–1 home league win over Borac Čačak on 7 December 2014. He improved his tally after the winter break by scoring four more league goals, including a brace in a 3–1 away victory over OFK Beograd on 13 April 2015. In total, Živković made 40 appearances in all competitions and scored seven goals, as the club won the championship title.

==== 2015–16 season ====
After missing the majority of the team's pre-season schedule due to national team duty, Živković made his first appearance of the season in a 1–0 home win over Dila Gori in the first leg of the UEFA Champions League second qualifying round on 14 July 2015. He entered the field as a 60th-minute substitute for Aboubakar Oumarou, managing to earn a free kick in the 81st minute, which would eventually result in the game-winning goal. On 17 July 2014, Živković scored once in the league's opener versus Metalac Gornji Milanovac, as the game ended 4–0. He then scored his first goal for the club in UEFA competitions, finding the back of the net in a 4–2 home victory over Steaua București on 5 August 2015. He also provided an assist in the game and helped Partizan reach the Champions League play-off round.

On 17 September, Živković scored a goal and provided an assist in a 3–2 home victory over AZ in the opening round of the Europa League group stage. He subsequently scored a brace in a 3–1 away win against Augsburg on 1 October. In the fifth round of the group stage, Živković continued his goal scoring form, netting the winning goal against AZ in a 2–1 away victory on 26 November.

On 4 February 2016, Živković was suspended from the first team for refusing to extend his contract with the club.

=== Benfica ===
On 5 July 2016, Živković signed a five-year deal with Portuguese champions S.L. Benfica. He was signed on a free transfer after his contract with Partizan had expired. He was given the number 17 shirt. On 2 October he was given his Benfica debut, coming on in the 84th minute for Gonçalo Guedes. He made his UEFA Champions League debut five months later in a 4–0 away loss to Borussia Dortmund. He ended the season winning the league title with Benfica, having scored no goals in 15 league appearances. In total, he appeared in 24 games and scored one goal in the national cup.

Živković played his first Benfica match of the 2017–18 season against Rio Ave.

=== PAOK ===
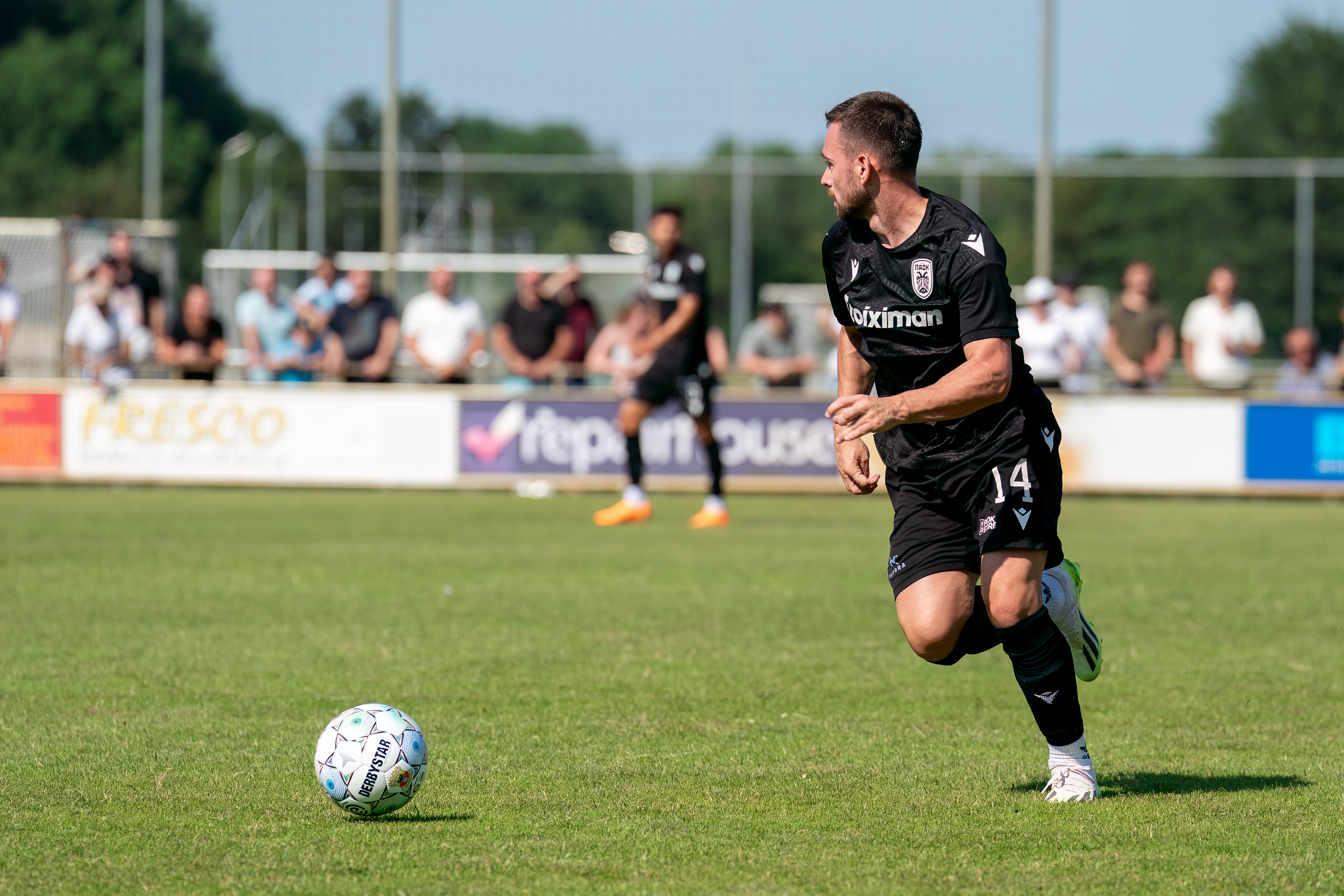
Živković playing for PAOK in 2023

On 8 September 2020, PAOK announced the signing of Živković on a free transfer. The 24-year-old Serbian international was previously released by Benfica as part of their summer overhaul and PAOK snapped him up on a two-year contract for an undisclosed fee. He made 88 appearances for Benfica, scoring four goals and contributing 24 assists. In his first official game for PAOK he scored a goal against his previous team Benfica, which as a result missed the Champions League play-offs. On 15 September 2020, Živković scored the winning goal as PAOK secured a berth in the UEFA Champions League play-off round after defeating his former club Benfica in Thessaloniki 2–1 in the 3rd qualifying round. On 5 November 2020, he scored a brace in a 4–1 home win 2020–21 UEFA Europa League group stage game against PSV Eindhoven helping PAOK to increase the possibility of qualifying for the next phase of the UEFA Europa League. Among some other highlights, on 29 April 2021, helped his club to seal qualification to the Greek Cup final with a spectacular lob in extra time, forming a 2–1 home win game against rivals AEK Athens. Zivkovic won the Greek Cup, his first trophy with PAOK, after helping his team win the final against Olympiacos with 1–2, giving a high class assist to one of his teammates on the 90th minute.

On 30 October 2021, Andrija agreed to a three-year contract extension for an annual fee in the excess of €1,000,000, which will keep tied with the club until the summer of 2024. On 9 December, he opened the score with a header, in a 2–0 UEFA Europa Conference League home win game against Lincoln, sealing the qualification of the club in the phase of Knockout round play-offs, for the first time in the last five years.

PAOK footballers, on the wings of Andrija Živković, outclassed Hajduk Split with 3–0 in the Hell of Toumba Stadium and passed to the qualifying Play-off round of the 2023–24 UEFA Europa Conference League. On 20 August 2023 Andrija Živković confirmed that he is in "life form", PAOK defeated Asteras Tripolis 3–0 in the first round of the Greek championship, as he scored two goals tonight. On 15 May 2024, in a 4–1 victory over Panathinaikos, Živković once again proved that he is a key player when it matters most, stepping on the field in the 66th minute as a substitute for Taison, scoring two goals and assisting one. On 19 May 2024 PAOK achieved a great success by winning the title of Greek champion in the last round of the 2023–24 Super League Greece, defeating arch-rival Aris with a score of 2–1. Živković had a notable role in this victory, providing an assist for PAOK's leading goal.

== International career ==
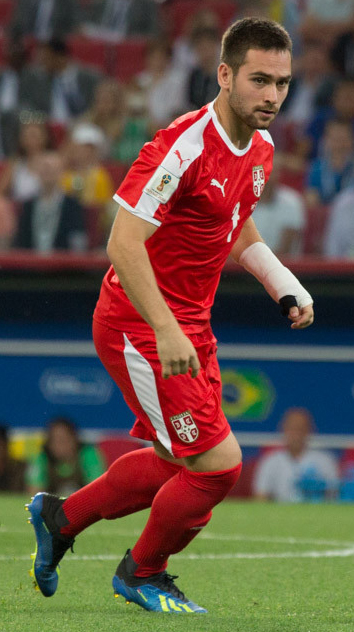
Andrija Živković in action for 2018 FIFA World Cup

Živković was a key member of the Serbia national under-17 team in two UEFA European Under-17 Championship qualification cycles, but failed to help them reach the final tournament on both occasions. He subsequently received his first call-up for the senior national team by manager Siniša Mihajlović, following his performances at club level. On 11 October 2013, Živković became the youngest player ever to debut for Serbia, aged 17, after coming on as a substitute for Zoran Tošić in a 2–0 home friendly win over Japan.

Subsequently, Živković took part at the 2014 UEFA European Under-19 Championship. He appeared in the opening two games of the tournament, before leaving the team upon his club's decision. Serbia were eventually eliminated by Portugal after a penalty shoot-out in the semi-final of the competition.

Likewise, Živković was selected to represent his country at the 2015 FIFA U-20 World Cup. He played in all of his team's seven games, as they won the gold medal. Furthermore, Živković managed to score on two occasions, including a direct free kick against Mexico, eventually being voted as the tournament's best goal.

=== Senior team ===
Živković made his debut for the Serbia national football team on 11 October 2013, becoming the youngest player in the history of Serbian team to make a debut.

In June 2018, Živković was included in the final 23-man squad for the 2018 FIFA World Cup, where he appeared in a match against Brazil.

In November 2022, he was selected in Serbia's squad for the 2022 FIFA World Cup in Qatar. He played in all three group stage matches, against Brazil, Cameroon, and Switzerland. He provided two assists in a group stage match against Cameroon, which ended in a 3–3 draw. Serbia finished fourth in the group.

Žikvović was selected in Serbia's squad for the UEFA Euro 2024. He played in all three group stage matches, against England, Slovenia and Denmark. Serbia finished fourth in the group.

== Career statistics ==
=== Club ===
As of 22 November 2026

Appearances and goals by club, season and competition
Club	Season	League			National cup (Note: Includes Serbian Cup, Taça de Portugal, Greek Cup)		League cup (Note: Includes Taça da Liga)		Europe		Other		Total	
Club	Season	Division	Apps	Goals	Apps	Goals	Apps	Goals	Apps	Goals	Apps	Goals	Apps	Goals
Partizan	2012–13	Serbian SuperLiga	1	0	—		—		—		—		1	0
Partizan	2013–14	Serbian SuperLiga	23	5	1	0	—		1	0	—		25	5
Partizan	2014–15	Serbian SuperLiga	24	5	6	2	—		10	0	—		40	7
Partizan	2015–16	Serbian SuperLiga	15	7	1	0	—		11	5	—		27	12
Partizan	Total		63	17	8	2	—		22	5	—		93	24
Benfica	2016–17	Primeira Liga	15	0	5	1	3	0	1 (Note: Appearance(s) in UEFA Champions League)	0	—		24	1
Benfica	2017–18	Primeira Liga	21	3	1	0	3	0	5	0	—		30	3
Benfica	2018–19	Primeira Liga	16	0	4	0	2	0	8 (Note: Five appearances in UEFA Champions League, three appearances in UEFA Europa League)	0	—		30	0
Benfica	2019–20	Primeira Liga	3	0	0	0	1	0	0	0	—		4	0
Benfica	Total		55	3	10	1	9	0	14	0	—		88	4
PAOK	2020–21	Super League Greece	33	10	6	1	—		9 (Note: Three appearances and one goal in UEFA Champions League, six appearances and two goals in UEFA Europa League)	3	—		48	14
PAOK	2021–22	Super League Greece	31	3	7	0	—		14 (Note: Appearances in UEFA Europa Conference League)	4	—		52	7
PAOK	2022–23	Super League Greece	33	7	6	0	—		2	0	—		41	7
PAOK	2023–24	Super League Greece	29	10	5	3	—		15	6	—		49	19
PAOK	2024–25	Super League Greece	25	8	4	2	—		13	2	—		42	12
PAOK	2025–26	Super League Greece	24	3	6	1	—		13	3	—		43	7
PAOK	2026–27	Super League Greece	11	6	1	0	—		4	1	—		16	7
PAOK	Total		185	47	35	7	—		70	19	—		292	73
Career total			304	67	53	10	9	0	106	24	—		473	101

=== International ===
As of match played 13 November 2026

Appearances and goals by national team and year
National team	Year	Apps	Goals
Serbia	2013	2	0
Serbia	2014	0	0
Serbia	2015	1	0
Serbia	2016	2	0
Serbia	2017	2	0
Serbia	2018	7	0
Serbia	2019	3	0
Serbia	2020	0	0
Serbia	2021	4	0
Serbia	2022	11	1
Serbia	2023	10	0
Serbia	2024	11	0
Serbia	2025	8	0
Serbia	2026	6	1
Total		67	2

Scores and results list Serbia's goal tally first, score column indicates score after each Živković goal.

List of international goals scored by Andrija Živković
No.	Date	Venue	Cap	Opponent	Score	Result	Competition
1	12 June 2022	Stožice Stadium, Ljubljana, Slovenia	26	Slovenia	1–0	2–2	2022–23 UEFA Nations League B
2	24 September 2026	Rajko Mitić Stadium, Belgrad, Serbia	63	Greece	1–0	1–2	2026–27 UEFA Nations League A

== Honours ==
Partizan

- Serbian SuperLiga: 2012–13, 2014–15
- Serbian Cup: 2015–16

Benfica

- Primeira Liga: 2016–17, 2018–19
- Taça de Portugal: 2016–17

PAOK

- Super League Greece: 2023–24
- Greek Cup: 2020–21

Serbia

- FIFA U-20 World Cup: 2015

Individual

- Sportsperson of the Year of Niš (2015)
- Super League Greece PAOK Player of the Season: 2020–21
- PAOK Player of the Month: July–August 2024, September 2024
- PAOK Player of the Season: 2023–24
