= 2023–24 PAOK FC season =

PAOK
2023–24 season
- President: Ivan Savvidis
- Manager: Răzvan Lucescu
- Stadium: Toumba Stadium
- Super League 1: 1st (winners)
- Greek Cup: Semi-finals (eliminated by Panathinaikos)
- UEFA Europa Conference League: Quarter-finals (eliminated by Club Brugge)
- Top goalscorer: League: Kiril Despodov (11 goals); All: Andrija Živković (19 goals)
- Highest home attendance: 25,346 vs Olympiacos (18 February 2024)
- Lowest home attendance: 5,800 vs Panserraikos (25 November 2023)
- Average home league attendance: 14,109
- Biggest win: A.E. Kifisia 0–6 PAOK
- Biggest defeat: PAOK 1–4 Olympiacos
Home colours	Away colours
- All statistics correct as of 19 May 2024.

The 2023–24 PAOK FC season was the club's 98th season in existence and the club's 65th consecutive season in the top flight of Greek football. In addition to the domestic league, PAOK participated in this season's editions of the Greek Cup and in the Europa Conference League.

PAOK had an amazing season, breaking the club's records on matches won (40 from 58 games) and goals scored (135). PAOK reached the quarter-finals of the UEFA Conference league and in the league they finished first in the regular season and managed to remain on top after the conclusion of the play-offs, winning their fourth league title on a remarkable fashion. PAOK defeated all their major rivals (AEK Athens, Olympiacos, Panathinaikos and Aris) in the last four matches, winning against the three league contenders from Athens at home and clinching the title with a 1–2 away victory over city rivals Aris at the Kleanthis Vikelidis Stadium on 19 May 2024.

== Coaching staff ==
Position	Staff
Head coach	(Romania) Răzvan Lucescu
Head of Football Department	(Greece) Christos Karypidis
Assistant Coach	(Greece) Pantelis Konstantinidis
Assistant Coach	(Romania) Nicolae Constantin
Goalkeeping Coach	(Italy) Giorgio Bianchi
Trainer	(Italy) Matteo Spatafora
Development coach	(Italy) Gianpaolo Castorina
Rehabilitation Coach	(Greece) Georgios Tsonakas
Mental Coach	(Romania) Christian Fota

Last updated: 1 September 2023

paokfc.gr

== Players ==
=== Squad ===
As of 29 January 2024

Note: Flags indicate national team as defined under FIFA eligibility rules; some limited exceptions apply. Players may hold more than one non-FIFA nationality.

No.	Pos.	Nation	Player
3	DF	NOR	Ivan Näsberg
4	DF	GRE	Konstantinos Koulierakis
5	DF	GRE	Giannis Michailidis
6	MF	GRE	Theocharis Tsingaras
7	MF	GRE	Giannis Konstantelias
8	MF	FRA	Soualiho Meïté (on loan from Benfica)
10	MF	AUT	Thomas Murg
11	FW	BRA	Taison
14	MF	SRB	Andrija Živković (vice-captain)
15	DF	NGR	William Troost-Ekong
16	DF	POL	Tomasz Kędziora (on loan from Dynamo Kyiv)
18	GK	SRB	Živko Živković
19	DF	ESP	Jonny

No.	Pos.	Nation	Player
20	DF	POR	Vieirinha (captain)
21	DF	GHA	Baba Rahman
22	MF	AUT	Stefan Schwab (vice-captain)
23	DF	ESP	Joan Sastre
27	MF	RUS	Magomed Ozdoyev
33	FW	TAN	Mbwana Samatta
42	GK	CRO	Dominik Kotarski
50	MF	POR	Filipe Soares
55	DF	POR	Rafa Soares
64	GK	GRE	Christos Talichmanidis
71	FW	ESP	Brandon Thomas
77	FW	BUL	Kiril Despodov
88	MF	BRA	Marcos Antônio (on loan from Lazio)

== Transfers ==
As of 29 January

=== In ===
No.	Pos	Player	Transferred from	Fee	Date	Source	
29	MF	(Greece) Georgios Vrakas	(Greece) Levadiakos	Loan return	1 July 2023		
51	MF	(Greece) Theocharis Tsingaras	(France) Toulouse	Loan return	1 July 2023		
68	MF	(Greece) Panagiotis Tzimas	(Greece) PAS Giannina	Loan return	1 July 2023		
15	DF	(Nigeria) William Troost-Ekong	(England) Watford	Free transfer	4 July 2023		
-	DF	(Ghana) Baba Rahman	(England) Chelsea	Free transfer	10 July 2023		
16	FW	(Poland) Tomasz Kędziora	(Ukraine) Dynamo Kyiv	Loan	11 July 2023		
33	FW	(Tanzania) Mbwana Samatta	(Turkey) Fenerbahçe	Undisclosed	17 July 2023		
27	MF	(Russia) Magomed Ozdoyev	(Turkey) Fatih Karagümrük	450K	6 August 2023		
8	MF	(France) Soualiho Meïté	(Portugal) Benfica	Loan	27 August 2023		
88	MF	(Brazil) Marcos Antônio	(Italy) Lazio	Loan	1 September 2023		
77	FW	(Bulgaria) Kiril Despodov	(Bulgaria) Ludogorets Razgrad	3,500,000	4 September 2023		
	MF	(Uruguay) Nicolás Quagliata	(Brazil) Cuiabá Esporte Clube	Loan Return	31 December 2023		
19	DF	(Spain) Jonny	(England) Wolverhampton Wanderers	Free transfer	29 January 2024		
Total							€ 3.950,000.00

=== Out ===
No.	Pos	Player	Transferred to	Fee	Date	Source	
21	MF	(Suriname) Diego Biseswar		End of contract	30 June 2023		
7	MF	(Morocco) Omar El Kaddouri		End of contract	30 June 2023		
9	FW	(Portugal) Nélson Oliveira		End of contract	30 June 2023		
27	MF	(Slovenia) Jasmin Kurtić	(Italy) Parma	End of loan	30 June 2023		
16	DF	(Poland) Tomasz Kędziora	(Ukraine) Dynamo Kyiv	End of loan	30 June 2023		
26	MF	(Portugal) Tiago Dantas	(Portugal) Benfica	End of loan	30 June 2023		
2	DF	(Greece) Giannis Kargas	(Cyprus) Anorthosis	Free transfer	28 June 2023		
4	DF	(Iceland) Sverrir Ingi Ingason	(Denmark) Midtjylland	4,0 mio	7 July 2023		
68	MF	(Greece) Panagiotis Tzimas	(Greece) PAS Giannina	Loan	20 July 2023		
8	MF	(Brazil) Douglas Augusto	(France) Nantes	5.5 mio	12 August 2023		
13	DF	(Brazil) Lucas Taylor	(Ukraine) Shakhtar Donetsk	300 k	1 July 2023		
24	DF	(Greece) Marios Tsaousis	(Greece) PAS Giannina	Loan	16 August 2023		
77	FW	(Germany) Khaled Narey	(Saudi Arabia) Al-Khaleej	2.0 mio	28 August 2023		
29	FW	(Greece) Georgios Vrakas	(Greece) Atromitos	Free transfer +50% resale-clause	6 January 2024		
50	MF	(Portugal) Felipe Soares	(Portugal) Famalicão	Loan	12 January 2024		
19	DF	(Greece) Lefteris Lyratzis	(Greece) Asteras Tripolis	Loan	19 January 2024		
Total							€ 11,800,000

== Pre-season and other friendlies ==
Win Draw Loss

5 July 2023 Friendly	FCSB	1–1	PAOK	Swolgen
19:30 EET, UTC+03:00	Coman 24'		Gordeziani 70'	Stadium: Multifunctionale accomodatie "De Kerkebos"

8 July 2023 Friendly	Go Ahead Eagles	2–1	PAOK	Zutphen
17:00 EET, UTC+03:00	Lidberg 35'; Adekanye 70'		Schwab 48'	Stadium: Sportcentrum Hanzepark

12 July 2022 Friendly	KRC Genk	2–3	PAOK	Swolgen
19:00 EET, UTC+03:00	Sor 62'; Castro 83'		Tsingaras 6'; Schwab 12'; Troost-Ekong (yellow card) 32'; A. Živković 55'	Stadium: Multifunctionale accomodatie "De Kerkebos"

15 July 2022 Friendly	PAOK	4–1	Al-Taawon	Tegelen
19:00 EET, UTC+03:00	Tzimas 33'; Murg 57'; Al-Ghamdi 67' (o.g.); Vrakas 72'		Medrán 6'	Stadium: Sportpark "De Bakenbos"; Attendance: Behind closed doors

16 July 2022 Friendly	Westerlo	3–2	PAOK	Dessel
17:00 EET, UTC+03:00	Matsuo 14'; Yow 15'; Daci 64'		Narey 5'; Brandon 17'	Stadium: Armand Melis Stadium

== Competitions ==
=== Overview ===
As of 19 May 2024

Competition	First match	Last match	Starting round	Record							
Competition	First match	Last match	Starting round	Pld	W	D	L	GF	GA	GD	Win %
Super League Greece	20 August 2023	19 May 2024	Matchday 1	36	25	5	6	87	34	+53	69.44
Greek Football Cup	7 December 2023	21 February 2024	Round of 16	6	5	0	1	14	2	+12	83.33
UEFA Europa Conference League	27 July 2023	18 April 2024	Second qualifying round	16	10	3	3	34	18	+16	62.50
Total				58	40	8	10	135	54	+81	68.97

Source: Soccerway

=== Managerial statistics ===
Head coach	From	To	Record							
Head coach	From	To	G	W	D	L	GF	GA	GD	Win %
(Romania) Răzvan Lucescu	27 July 2023	19 May 2024	58	40	8	10	135	54	+81	68.97

Last updated: 19 May 2024

=== Super League Greece ===
==== League table ====
Pos	Team	Pld	W	D	L	GF	GA	GD	Pts	Qualification or relegation
1	PAOK	26	19	3	4	66	21	+45	60	Qualification for the Play-off round
2	AEK Athens	26	17	8	1	60	25	+35	59	Qualification for the Play-off round
3	Olympiacos	26	18	3	5	58	24	+34	57	Qualification for the Play-off round
4	Panathinaikos	26	17	5	4	62	21	+41	56	Qualification for the Play-off round
5	Aris	26	12	6	8	39	29	+10	42	Qualification for the Play-off round

Source: Super League Greece
Rules for classification: 1) Points; 2) Head-to-head points; 3) Head-to-head goal difference; 4) Goal difference; 5) Goals scored; 6) Play-offs (neutral ground).
(Note: Criterion 6 is only used if needed to decide champion, teams for relegation or teams for UEFA competitions).

==== Matches ====
20 August 2023 1	PAOK	3–0	Asteras Tripolis	Thessaloniki
20:00 EEST, UTC+03:00	Murg 22'; Taison (yellow card) 45+4'; A. Živković 54', 59'; R. Soares (yellow card) 90'	Report	Miritello (penalty missed) 41'; Munafo (yellow card) 78'	Stadium: Toumba Stadium; Attendance: 10,037; Referee: Vasilis Fotias (Pella)

27 August 2023 2	PAOK	2–1	A.E. Kifisia	Thessaloniki
21:00 EEST, UTC+03:00	A. Živković (penalty missed) 25'; Tzimas 45+2'; Konstantelias (yellow card) 64'; Capan 78' (o.g.)	Report	Peios (yellow card) 20'; Vafeas (yellow card) 24'; Kristinsson (yellow card) 60'; Masouras 75'; Ožegović (yellow card) 80'; Šakić (yellow card) 90'	Stadium: Toumba Stadium; Attendance: 8,876; Referee: Konstantinos Tsetsilas (Grevena)

3 September 2023 3	OFI	1–0	PAOK	Heraklion
20:00 EEST, UTC+03:00	Gallegos (yellow card) 21'; Bakić (yellow card) 26'; Pasalidis (yellow card) 45+2'; Abanda 90+7'; Toral (yellow card) 90+9'	Report	Troost-Ekong (yellow card) 45'; A. Živković (yellow card) 53'; Meïté (yellow card) 70'; Baba (yellow card) 72'; Konstantelias (yellow card) 85'	Stadium: Theodoros Vardinogiannis Stadium; Attendance: 4,682; Referee: Aristotelis Diamantopoulos (Arcadia)

17 September 2023 4	PAOK	0–0	Aris	Thessaloniki
20:30 EEST, UTC+03:00	Vieirinha (yellow card) 36'; Koulierakis (yellow card) 67'; Kędziora (yellow card) 90+3'; Murg (yellow card) 90+7'	Report	Doukouré (yellow card) 22'; Montoya (yellow card) 28'; Cuesta (yellow card) 87'	Stadium: Toumba Stadium; Attendance: 17,731; Referee: Anastasios Papapetrou (Athens)

24 September 2023 5	PAS Giannina	1–3	PAOK	Ioannina
20:30 EEST, UTC+03:00	Pamlidis 25', (yellow card) 76'; Kiakos (yellow card) 70'; Erramuspe (yellow card) 72'; Liasos (yellow card) 79'	Report	Konstantelias 4', 33'; Kędziora (yellow card) 37'; A. Živković 77', (yellow card) 79'	Stadium: Zosimades Stadium; Attendance: 2,360; Referee: Angelos Evangelou (Athens)

27 September 2023 6	PAOK	3–0	Volos	Thessaloniki
20:30 EEST, UTC+03:00	Koulierakis 39'; Murg 45+1'; Samatta 55'	Report	Tachatos (yellow card) 22'	Stadium: Toumba Stadium; Attendance: 8,879; Referee: Anastasios Sidiropoulos (Dodecanese)

1 October 2023 7	Panathinaikos	2–2	PAOK	Athens
19:30 EEST, UTC+03:00	Palacios 32'; Đuričić (yellow card) 48'; Schenkeveld (yellow card) 90+3'; Jeremejeff 90+6'	Report	Brandon 19'; Baba (yellow card) 44'; Taison (yellow card) 45+2'; Schwab (yellow card) 54'; A. Živković 58'; Kotarski (yellow card) 77'	Stadium: Leoforos Alexandras Stadium; Attendance: 11,530; Referee: Tiago Martins (Portugal)

22 October 2023 8	PAOK	2–0	Atromitos	Thessaloniki
18:30 EEST, UTC+03:00	Ozdoyev 44', 51'; Murg (yellow card) 54'; Baba (yellow card) 72'; Kędziora (yellow card) 88'	Report	Tsakmakis (yellow card) 19'; Tzavellas (yellow card) 54'; Camara (yellow card) 64'	Stadium: Toumba Stadium; Attendance: 13,106; Referee: Konstantinos Poulikidis (Drama)

30 October 2023 9	AEK Athens	2–0	PAOK	Athens
19:30 EET, UTC+02:00	Pineda 17', (yellow card) 90+4'; Szymański (yellow card) 32'; Eliasson 54'; Galanopoulos (yellow card) 87'; Gaćinović (yellow card) 90+4'	Report	(yellow card) 24' A. Živković; (yellow card) 29' Baba; (yellow card) 80' Sastre; (yellow card) 87' Taison; (yellow card) 88' Brandon	Stadium: Agia Sophia Stadium; Attendance: 31,100; Referee: Felix Brych (Germany)

5 November 2023 10	Olympiacos	2–4	PAOK	Piraeus
19:30 EET, UTC+02:00	Hezze (yellow card) 45+2'; Retsos (yellow card) 57'; Camara (yellow card) 76'; Fortounis 86'; Masouras 90+8'	Report	A. Živković 38'; Brandon 56' (pen.), 65', (yellow card) 57'; Ozdoyev 78'; Kotarski (yellow card) 90+2'	Stadium: Karaiskakis Stadium; Attendance: 28,301; Referee: Daniel Schlager (Germany)

12 November 2023 11	PAOK	2–1	Panetolikos	Thessaloniki
17:30 EET, UTC+02:00	Samatta 26'; Murg (yellow card) 33'; A. Živković 36'; Michailidis (yellow card) 67'	Report	Torrejón 20'; Liavas (yellow card) 25'; Duarte (yellow card) 34'; Oikonomou (yellow card) 65'	Stadium: Toumba Stadium; Attendance: 11,785; Referee: Panagiotis Tsiaras (Kavala)

25 November 2023 12	PAOK	5–0	Panserraikos	Thessaloniki
19:30 EET, UTC+02:00	Ozdoyev 21'; Murg 28', 71'; Despodov 74'; R. Soares 90'	Report		Stadium: Toumba Stadium; Attendance: 5,800; Referee: Alexandros Katsikogiannis (Epirus)
Note: Match was initially scheduled to be held at the Serres Stadium which did not meet the required standards in November 2023. As a result, MD 12 and MD 25 matches between the two teams were reversed.

4 December 2023 13	PAOK	3–0	Lamia	Thessaloniki
18:00 EET, UTC+02:00	Konstantelias 21'; R. Soares 43'; Sastre 57'	Report	Tzandaris (yellow card) 72'	Stadium: Toumba Stadium; Attendance: 7,926; Referee: Anastasios Sidiropoulos (Dodecanese)

17 December 2023 14	Asteras Tripolis	1–4	PAOK	Tripoli
17:30 EET, UTC+02:00	Álvarez (yellow card) 45+2'; Alagbe (yellow card) 58'; Zukanović 63'	Report	Murg 34', 69'; Despodov 59', 90'; Schwab (yellow card) 86'	Stadium: Theodoros Kolokotronis Stadium; Attendance: Behind Closed Doors; Referee: Dimitris Maloutas (Imathia)
Note: Match was initially scheduled for 10 December, but it was postponed as referees were on a strike. On 11 December, Greek authorities ordered all football matches to be played behind closed doors for two months following the death of a police officer who was hit by a naval flare during a Greek Volleyball match between Olympiacos and Panathinaikos.

21 December 2023 15	A.E. Kifisia	0–6	PAOK	Kaisariani
20:00 EET, UTC+02:00	Tetteh (yellow card) 53'	Report	Konstantelias 13'; Brandon 28'; Despodov 34'; Murg 52'; Ozdoyev 72'; Tsingaras 80'	Stadium: Michalis Kritikopoulos Stadium; Attendance: Behind Closed Doors; Referee: Konstantinos Poulikidis (Drama)

3 January 2024 16	PAOK	4–0	OFI	Thessaloniki
20:00 EET, UTC+02:00	Schwab (penalty missed) 23'; Despodov 39'; Baba 41'; Samatta (penalty missed) 45+3'; Sastre (yellow card) 83'; Marcos Antônio 89'; Brandon 90+2'	Report	Vouros (yellow card) 21'; Neira (yellow card) 30'; Lampropoulos (yellow card) 36'	Stadium: Toumba Stadium; Attendance: Behind Closed Doors; Referee: Konstantinos Tsetsilas (Grevena)

7 January 2024 17	Aris	2–1	PAOK	Thessaloniki
19:30 EET, UTC+02:00	Suleymanov 46'; Saverio 59'; Jean Jules (yellow card) 88'; Darida (yellow card) 90'	Report	Baba (yellow card) 6', (goal) 75'; Meïté (yellow card) 48'; Ozdoyev (yellow card) 64'; Taison (yellow card) 88'	Stadium: Kleanthis Vikelidis Stadium; Attendance: Behind Closed Doors; Referee: Sandi Putros (Denmark)

14 January 2024 18	PAOK	4–0	PAS Giannina	Thessaloniki
20:30 EET, UTC+02:00	Baba 29'; Meïté 49'; Tzimas 53'; Rienstra 66' (o.g.)	Report		Stadium: Toumba Stadium; Attendance: Behind Closed Doors; Referee: Alexandros Tsakalidis (Chalkidiki)

21 January 2024 19	Volos	1–5	PAOK	Volos
16:00 EET, UTC+02:00	Kalogeropoulos (yellow card) 37'; Deletić 58'; Moraitis (yellow card) 80'	Report	Despodov 22', 51'; Michailidis (yellow card) 26'; Murg 45+1'; Taison 71'; Tzimas 89'	Stadium: Panthessaliko Stadium; Attendance: Behind Closed Doors; Referee: Alexandros Katsikogiannis (Epirus)

28 January 2024 20	PAOK	2–1	Panathinaikos	Thessaloniki
20:30 EET, UTC+02:00	Despodov 43', 56'; Taison (yellow card) 50'; Murg (yellow card) 53'; Baba (yellow card) 76'; Koulierakis (yellow card) 90+1'	Report	Bakasetas 51' (pen.); Đuričić (yellow card) 65'; Bernard (yellow card) 79'	Stadium: Toumba Stadium; Attendance: Behind Closed Doors; Referee: Rohit Saggi (Norway)

4 February 2024 21	Atromitos	0–2	PAOK	Athens
20:30 EET, UTC+02:00	Acevedo (yellow card) 45+4'; Tsakmakis (yellow card) 69'; Friðjónsson (yellow card) 85'	Report	Brandon (yellow card) 45+5'; Schwab 89'; Meïté (yellow card) 90+1'; Konstantelias 90+3'; Koulierakis (yellow card) 90+5'	Stadium: Peristeri Stadium; Attendance: Behind Closed Doors; Referee: Anastasios Sidiropoulos (Dodecanese)

11 February 2024 22	PAOK	1–1	AEK Athens	Thessaloniki
20:00 EET, UTC+02:00	Samatta (yellow card) 34'; Kędziora 89'; Brandon (yellow card) 90+1'	Report	Rota (yellow card) 25'; Vida (yellow card) 35'; Eliasson 47'; Callens (yellow card) 88'	Stadium: Toumba Stadium; Attendance: Behind Closed Doors; Referee: Aliyar Aghayev (Azerbaijan)

18 February 2024 23	PAOK	1–4	Olympiacos	Thessaloniki
20:30 EET, UTC+02:00	Despodov (yellow card) 13', (goal) 39'; Brandon (yellow card) 71'	Report	Biancone (yellow card) 12'; Navarro 29', (yellow card) 68'; Fortounis (yellow card) 41'; Podence 54'; Hezze (yellow card) 57'; Paschalakis (yellow card) 64'; Carmo (yellow card) 80'; El Kaabi 83', 90'	Stadium: Toumba Stadium; Attendance: 25,346; Referee: Christian Dingert (Germany)

25 February 2024 24	Panetolikos	1–3	PAOK	Agrinio
17:00 EET, UTC+02:00	Chatzitheodoridis 5', (yellow card) 22'; Juanpi (yellow card) 57'	Report	Torrejón 72' (o.g.); A. Živković 73'; Konstantelias 90'	Stadium: Panetolikos Stadium; Attendance: 1,512; Referee: Alexandros Katsikogiannis (Epirus)

28 February 2024 25	Panserraikos	0–2	PAOK	Serres
20:00 EET, UTC+02:00	Moreira (yellow card) 37' (yellow-red card) 69'; Ikonomou (yellow card) 40'; Deligiannidis (red card) 83'	Report	Schwab (yellow card) 15'; Konstantelias 45+2'; Petavrakis 90' (o.g.)	Stadium: Serres Municipal Stadium; Attendance: 984; Referee: Aristotelis Diamantopoulos (Arcadia)

3 March 2024 26	Lamia	0–2	PAOK	Lamia
19:30 EET, UTC+02:00	Tzanetopoulos (yellow card) 42'; Papadopoulos (yellow card) 90+4'	Report	Kędziora (yellow card) 34'; A. Živković (yellow card) 49'; Taison 71'; Baba 90+2'	Stadium: Lamia Municipal Stadium; Referee: Konstantinos Poulikidis (Drama)

==== Results summary ====
Overall								Home						Away					
Pld	W	D	L	GF	GA	GD	Pts	W	D	L	GF	GA	GD	W	D	L	GF	GA	GD
26	19	3	4	66	21	+45	60	10	2	1	32	8	+24	9	1	3	34	13	+21

Last updated: 3 March 2024.
Source: Competitive matches

==== Results by round ====
Round	1	2	3	4	5	6	7	8	9	10	11	12	13	14	15	16	17	18	19	20	21	22	23	24	25	26
Ground	H	H	A	H	A	H	A	H	A	A	H	H	H	A	A	H	A	H	A	H	A	H	H	A	A	A
Result	W	W	L	D	W	W	D	W	L	W	W	W	W	W	W	W	L	W	W	W	W	D	L	W	W	W
Position	1	2	3	4	2	2	2	3	4	4	4	4	3	1	1	1	3	1	1	1	1	1	2	2	2	1

A = Away; H = Home; W = Win; D = Draw; L = Loss

==== Play-off round ====
The top six teams from Regular season will meet twice (10 matches per team) for places in the 2024–25 UEFA Champions League, 2024–25 UEFA Conference League, and potentially 2024–25 UEFA Europa League (depending on Greek Cup), as well as deciding the league champion.

Pos	Team	Pld	W	D	L	GF	GA	GD	Pts	Qualification
1	PAOK (C)	36	25	5	6	87	34	+53	80	Qualification for the Champions League second qualifying round
2	AEK Athens	36	23	9	4	80	35	+45	78	Qualification for the Conference League second qualifying round
3	Olympiacos	36	23	5	8	78	36	+42	74	Qualification for the Europa League league phase (Note: Olympiacos qualified for the Europa League league phase as 2023–24 UEFA Europa Conference League winners.)
4	Panathinaikos	36	22	6	8	82	37	+45	72	Qualification for the Europa League second qualifying round (Note: Panathinaikos qualified for the Europa League second qualifying round as 2023–24 Greek Cup winners.)
5	Aris	36	16	7	13	51	44	+7	55	
6	Lamia	36	9	8	19	43	79	−36	35	

Source: Super League Greece
Rules for classification: 1) Points; 2) Head-to-head points (Regular season and play-off); 3) Head-to-head goal difference (Regular season and play-off); 4) Regular season position.
(C) Champions

==== Results summary ====
Overall								Home						Away					
Pld	W	D	L	GF	GA	GD	Pts	W	D	L	GF	GA	GD	W	D	L	GF	GA	GD
10	6	2	2	21	13	+8	20	4	0	1	12	5	+7	2	2	1	9	8	+1

Last updated: 19 May 2024.
Source: Competitive matches

==== Results by round ====
Round	1	2	3	4	5	6	7	8	9	10
Ground	H	A	H	A	A	A	H	H	H	A
Result	L	W	W	D	L	D	W	W	W	W
Position	2	2	1	1	3	3	2	2	1	1

Updated to match(es) played on 19 May 2024. Source: League matches
A = Away; H = Home; W = Win; D = Draw; L = Loss

• Matches are in chronological order

==== Matches ====
10 March 2024 1	PAOK	0–1	Aris	Thessaloniki
21:00 EEST, UTC+02:00	Schwab (yellow card) 60'; A. Živković (yellow card) 75'	Report	Morón 31'; Ansarifard (yellow card) 66'; Verstraete (yellow card) 90+5'; Ferrari (yellow card) 90+6'	Stadium: Toumba Stadium; Attendance: Behind Closed Doors; Referee: Rade Obrenović (Slovenia)
Note: Match played behind closed doors due to a one-game ban imposed on PAOK fans by the Standing Committee on Spectator Violence.

31 March 2024 2	Panathinaikos	2–3	PAOK	Athens
18:00 EEST, UTC+03:00	Bernard 29', 90+3'; Kotsiras (yellow card) 53'; Palacios (red card) 88'	Report	Despodov 2', (yellow card) 9'; Kędziora (yellow card) 31'; Brandon 37'; Kotarski (yellow card) 65'; Samatta (yellow card) 73'; Schwab 89' (pen.); Koulierakis (yellow card) 90+5'; Taison (yellow card) 90+5'	Stadium: Leoforos Alexandras Stadium; Attendance: 13,209; Referee: Mikkel Redder (Denmark)

3 April 2024 3	PAOK	3–1	Lamia	Thessaloniki
19:30 EEST, UTC+03:00	Michailidis 45+1'; Schwab 70', 88' (pen.)	Report	Martínez 7'; Tzanetopoulos (yellow card) 59'; Santana (yellow card) 66'; Tsiloulis (yellow card) 80'	Stadium: Toumba Stadium; Attendance: 12,190; Referee: Alexandros Katsikogiannis (Epirus)

7 April 2024 4	AEK Athens	2–2	PAOK	Athens
20:30 EEST, UTC+03:00	Gaćinović 30', (yellow card) 36'; Amrabat 49', (yellow card) 71'; Szymański (yellow card) 61'; Vida (yellow card) 68'; Ponce (yellow card) 80'; Athanasiadis (yellow card) 84'	Report	Murg (yellow card) 27'; Meïté (yellow card) 28'; Jonny (yellow card) 48'; Baba 62', (yellow card) 68'; A. Živković (yellow card) 77'; Ozdoyev 89'; Sastre (yellow card) 90+6'	Stadium: Agia Sophia Stadium; Attendance: 31,080; Referee: Tobias Stieler (Germany)

21 April 2024 6	Olympiacos	2–1	PAOK	Piraeus
20:30 EEST, UTC+03:00	Podence (penalty missed) 27'; Quini 27'; Abbey (yellow card) 35'; Martins 61'	Report	Koulierakis (yellow card) 25'; Ozdoyev (yellow card) 63'; A. Živković (yellow card) 63'; Z. Živković (yellow card) 64'; Baba (yellow card) 90'; Marcos Antônio 90+2'	Stadium: Karaiskakis Stadium; Attendance: 29,014; Referee: Miguel Nogueira (Portugal)

24 April 2024 7	Lamia	1–1	PAOK	Lamia
17:00 EEST, UTC+03:00	Kontonikos (yellow card) 45+1'; Slivka 45+4', (yellow card) 85' (yellow-red card) 90+1'; Stanko (yellow card) 68'; Giannoutsos (yellow card) 75'; Amaral (red card) 90+1'; Núñez (yellow card) 90+6'	Report	Schwab 90+10'	Stadium: Lamia Municipal Stadium; Attendance: 1,312; Referee: Alexandros Katsikogiannis (Epirus)

28 April 2024 8	PAOK	3–2	AEK Athens	Thessaloniki
19:30 EEST, UTC+03:00	Konstantelias 3', 81', (yellow card) 41'; Brandon (yellow card) 21'; Jonny (yellow card) 38'; Sastre 90'; A. Živković (yellow card) 90+9'	Report	Pineda 9'; Rota (yellow card) 20'; Araujo (yellow card) 64'; Vida 75'; Zuber (yellow card) 89'	Stadium: Toumba Stadium; Attendance: 17,362; Referee: Robert Schröder (Germany)

12 May 2024 5	PAOK	2–0	Olympiacos	Thessaloniki
20:00 EEST, UTC+03:00	Taison 26'; Schwab (yellow card) 49'; Brandon (yellow card) 57'; A. Živković 65'; Despodov (yellow card) 90+2'	Report	Podence (yellow card) 49'; Carmo (yellow card) 54'; Quini (yellow card) 62'; Retsos (yellow card) 89'	Stadium: Toumba Stadium; Attendance: 22,102; Referee: Willy Delajod (France)
Note: Match was rescheduled due to Olympiacos and PAOK fixtures in the UEFA Europa Conference League quarter-finals.

15 May 2024 9	PAOK	4–1	Panathinaikos	Thessaloniki
20:00 EEST, UTC+03:00	Taison 37'; A. Živković 72' (pen.), 90+2'; Koulierakis (yellow card) 88'; Vieirinha 89'; Samatta (yellow card) 90+1'	Report	Juankar (yellow card) 59'; Jedvaj (yellow card) 70'; Jeremejeff 78'; Mladenović (yellow card) 87'	Stadium: Toumba Stadium; Attendance: 22,281; Referee: Allard Lindhout (Netherlands)

19 May 2024 10	Aris	1–2	PAOK	Thessaloniki
20:00 EEST, UTC+03:00	Montoya (yellow card) 39'; Morón 47'; Verstraete (yellow card) 55'; Manu García (yellow card) 88'; Zamora (yellow card) 90+3'	Report	Michailidis (yellow card) 1' (yellow-red card) 78'; Brandon 30'; Taison 62'; Kędziora (yellow card) 70'; Konstantelias (yellow card) 77'	Stadium: Kleanthis Vikelidis Stadium; Attendance: 18,644; Referee: Orel Grinfeld (Israel)

=== Greek Cup ===
==== Round of 16 ====
7 December 2023 1st leg	PAOK	1–0	Volos	Thessaloniki
18:00 EET, UTC+02:00	Schwab 45+2' (pen.); Meïté (yellow card) 74'; Vieirinha (yellow card) 88'		Cornette (yellow card) 35'; Comba (yellow card) 90'	Stadium: Toumba Stadium; Referee: Angelos Evangelou (Athens)

10 January 2024 2nd leg	Volos	0–2 (0–3 agg.)	PAOK	Volos
17:00 EET, UTC+02:00			Konstantelias 17'; Schwab (yellow card) 54', (goal) 73'	Stadium: Panthessaliko Stadium; Attendance: Behind Closed Doors; Referee: Dimitris Maloutas (Imathia)

==== Quarter-finals ====
17 January 2024 1st leg	Panserraikos	0–4	PAOK	Serres
17:00 EET, UTC+02:00			Näsberg 8'; Sastre 22'; Brandon (penalty missed) 59'; Marcos Antônio 69'; A. Živković 79'	Stadium: Serres Municipal Stadium; Attendance: Behind Closed Doors; Referee: Konstantinos Tsetsilas (Grevena)

31 January 2024 2nd leg	PAOK	5–0 (9–0 agg.)	Panserraikos	Thessaloniki
21:00 EET, UTC+02:00	Tzimas 21'; A. Živković 26'; André Ricardo 83'; Brandon 85'; Konstantelias 90+1'	Report	Petavrakis (yellow card) 67'	Stadium: Toumba Stadium; Attendance: Behind closed doors Referee: Panagiotis Tsiaras (Kavala)

==== Semi-finals ====
14 February 2024 1st leg	PAOK	0–1	Panathinaikos	Thessaloniki
19:30 EET, UTC+02:00	Taison (red card) 79'; Z. Živković (yellow card) 86'		Jedvaj (yellow card) 24'; Rubén Pérez (yellow card) 48'; Šporar 53'; Bakasetas (red card) 79'; Mladenović (yellow card) 84'	Stadium: Toumba Stadium; Attendance: 18,008; Referee: Allard Lindhout (Netherlands)

21 February 2024 2nd leg	Panathinaikos	1–2 (2–2 agg.) (6–5 p)	PAOK	Athens
19:00 EET, UTC+02:00	Bakasetas (yellow card) 16'; Zeca (yellow card) 68'; Palacios (yellow card) 82'; Limnios 120+9'		Brandon (yellow card) 23'; Meïté (yellow card) 51'; A. Živković 72'; Despodov (yellow card) 90'; Ozdoyev (yellow card) 97'; Koulierakis (yellow card) 100'; Kędziora 105'; Murg (yellow card) 111'	Stadium: Leoforos Alexandras Stadium; Referee: Daniel Siebert (Germany)
	Penalties
	Šporar (penalty missed); Jeremejeff (penalty scored); Bakasetas (penalty scored); Kotsiras (penalty scored); Mladenović (penalty scored); Limnios (penalty missed); Mancini (penalty scored); Willian Arão (penalty missed); Schenkeveld (penalty scored)		(penalty scored) Koulierakis; (penalty scored) Murg; (penalty scored) Kędziora; (penalty scored) Meïté; (penalty missed) Despodov; (penalty missed) Ozdoyev; (penalty scored) Marcos Antonio; (penalty missed) Jonny; (penalty missed) Samatta

=== UEFA Europa Conference League ===
==== Second qualifying round ====
27 July 2023 First leg	PAOK (Greece)	0–0	(Israel) Beitar Jerusalem	Thessaloniki, Greece
20:30 EEST	Schwab (penalty missed) 12'; Baba (yellow card) 86'; Taison (yellow card) 90+1'	Report	Gotlieb (yellow card) 10'; Bitton (yellow card) 21'; Silva (yellow card) 76'; Micha (yellow card) 90+1'	Stadium: Toumba Stadium; Attendance: 16,851; Referee: Mykola Balakin (Ukraine)

3 August 2023 Second leg	Beitar Jerusalem (Israel)	1–4 (1–4 agg.)	(Greece) PAOK	Jerusalem, Israel
20:30 IDT	Shua (yellow card) 14', (penalty missed) 42'; Friday 45+7'	Report	Gotlieb 12' (o.g.); Michailidis (yellow card) 32'; Douglas Augusto (red card) 40'; Brandon 45+1'; Thomas 90+2' (o.g.); Konstantelias 90+6'	Stadium: Teddy Stadium; Attendance: 26,557; Referee: Benoît Millot (France)

==== Third qualifying round ====
10 August 2023 First leg	Hajduk Split (Croatia)	0–0	(Greece) PAOK	Split, Croatia
22:00 EEST	Sigur (yellow card) 63'	Report	Tsingaras (yellow card) 32'; Brandon (yellow card) 40'; Schwab (yellow card) 82'; Baba (yellow card) 87'	Stadium: Stadion Poljud; Attendance: 33,573; Referee: Morten Krogh (Denmark)

17 August 2023 Second leg	PAOK (Greece)	3–0 (3–0 agg.)	(Croatia) Hajduk Split	Thessaloniki, Greece
20:30 EEST	Schwab 12' (pen.); Baba (yellow card) 52'; Konstantelias (yellow card) 56'; Samatta (yellow card) 75'; A. Živković 79', 85'	Report	Moufi (yellow card) 23'; Šarlija (yellow card) 51'; Odjidja-Ofoe (yellow card) 63'; Diallo (yellow card) 84'; Čuić (yellow card) 89'	Stadium: Toumba Stadium; Attendance: 24,133; Referee: Sascha Stegemann (Germany)

==== Play-off round ====
24 August 2023 First leg	Heart of Midlothian (Scotland)	1–2	(Greece) PAOK	Edinburgh, Scotland
21:45 EEST	Shankland 9' (pen.), (yellow card) 51'; Devlin (yellow card) 83'	Report	Schwab 12' (pen.); Tsingaras (yellow card) 51'; A. Živković 75'; Troost-Ekong (yellow card) 83'; R. Soares (yellow card) 90+5'; Murg (yellow card) 90+9'	Stadium: Tynecastle Park; Attendance: 17,409; Referee: Andris Treimanis (Latvia)

31 August 2023 Second leg	PAOK (Greece)	4–0 (6–1 agg.)	(Scotland) Heart of Midlothian	Thessaloniki, Greece
20:30 EEST	Taison 16', 71'; Brandon 23', (yellow card) 24'; Koulierakis (yellow card) 54'; Konstantelias 57'	Report	Sibbick (yellow card) 18'; Shankland (yellow card) 37'; Devlin (yellow card) 45'	Stadium: Toumba Stadium; Attendance: 19,032; Referee: Guillermo Cuadra (Spain)

==== Group stage ====
The draw for the group stage was held on 1 September 2023.

Pos	Team	Pld	W	D	L	GF	GA	GD	Pts	Qualification	PAOK	FRA	ABE	HJK
1	(Greece) PAOK	6	5	1	0	16	10	+6	16	Advance to round of 16	—	2–1	2–2	4–2
2	(Germany) Eintracht Frankfurt	6	3	0	3	11	7	+4	9	Advance to knockout round play-offs	1–2	—	2–1	6–0
3	(Scotland) Aberdeen	6	1	3	2	10	10	0	6		2–3	2–0	—	1–1
4	(Finland) HJK	6	0	2	4	7	17	−10	2		2–3	0–1	2–2	—

Source: UEFA
Rules for classification: Group stage tiebreakers

21 September 2023 1	HJK Helsinki (Finland)	2–3	(Greece) PAOK	Helsinki, Finland
19:45 EET, UTC+03:00	Bandé 35'; Hetemaj (yellow card) 61'; Radulović 90+9' (pen.)	Report	Koulierakis 55'; Baba (yellow card) 64'; Despodov (yellow card) 64', (goal) 81'; Brandon 90+4'	Stadium: Bolt Arena; Attendance: 8,532; Referee: Marian Alexandru Barbu (Romania)

5 October 2023 2	PAOK (Greece)	2–1	(Germany) Eintracht Frankfurt	Thessaloniki, Greece
22:00 EET, UTC+03:00	A. Živković 28'; Koulierakis 90+2'; Meïté (yellow card) 90+3', (red card) 90+6'	Report	Nkounkou (yellow card) 43'; Marmoush 68'; Trapp (red card) 90+6'	Stadium: Toumba Stadium; Attendance: 21,549; Referee: Simone Sozza (Italy)

26 October 2023 3	Aberdeen (Scotland)	2–3	(Greece) PAOK	Aberdeen, Scotland
22:00 EET, UTC+03:00	Miovski 50'; Polvara 58'; Rubežić (yellow card) 90+5'	Report	Schwab (yellow card) 38', (goal) 90+6' (pen.); Despodov 73'; Vieirinha 84'; Troost-Ekong (yellow card) 90+2'	Stadium: Pittodrie Stadium; Attendance: 16,089; Referee: Sebastian Gishamer (Austria)

9 November 2023 4	PAOK (Greece)	2–2	(Scotland) Aberdeen	Thessaloniki, Greece
19:45 EET, UTC+02:00	Taison 23'; Vieirinha (yellow card) 34'; Tsingaras (yellow card) 45'; Samatta 67'; Koulierakis (yellow card) 90+7'	Report	Duk 14'; Hayes (yellow card) 64'; McGrath 70'	Stadium: Toumba Stadium; Attendance: 19,019; Referee: Juxhin Xhaja (Albania)

30 November 2023 5	Eintracht Frankfurt (Germany)	1–2	(Greece) PAOK	Frankfurt, Germany
22:00 EET, UTC+02:00	Marmoush 58', (yellow card) 81'; Tuta (yellow card) 69'; Jakić (yellow card) 90+2' (yellow-red card) 90+4'	Report	Kędziora 55'; Brandon (yellow card) 69'; A. Živković 73'	Stadium: Deutsche Bank Park; Attendance: 58,000; Referee: Damian Sylwestrzak (Poland)

14 December 2023 6	PAOK (Greece)	4–2	(Finland) HJK Helsinki	Thessaloniki, Greece
19:45 EET, UTC+02:00	Troost-Ekong (yellow card) 35'; Ozdoyev 37'; Konstantelias 47'; Toivio 53' (o.g.); Murg 85'	Report	Radulović 6'; Hostikka (yellow card) 21'; Hetemaj 90+2' (pen.)	Stadium: Toumba Stadium; Attendance: 13,696; Referee: Giorgi Kruashvili (Georgia)

==== Round of 16 ====
7 March 2024 First leg	Dinamo Zagreb (Croatia)	2–0	(Greece) PAOK	Zagreb, Croatia
22:00 EET, UTC+02:00	Petković 37', 71'; Vidović (yellow card) 47'; Sučić (yellow card) 87'; Zagorac (yellow card) 87'	Report	Ozdoyev (yellow card) 62'; Murg (yellow card) 76'; Despodov (yellow card) 90+2'	Stadium: Stadion Maksimir; Attendance: 18,562; Referee: Aliyar Aghayev (Azerbaijan)

14 March 2024 Second leg	PAOK (Greece)	5–1 (5–3 agg.)	(Croatia) Dinamo Zagreb	Thessaloniki, Greece
19:45 EET, UTC+02:00	Baba 27', (yellow card) 87'; Sučić 33' (o.g.); Brandon 42'; Koulierakis (yellow card) 60', (goal) 72'; A. Živković 88' (pen.)	Report	Baturina (yellow card) 14'; Hoxha 49'; Mišić (yellow card) 87'; Ogiwara (yellow card) 90+1'	Stadium: Toumba Stadium; Attendance: 19,701; Referee: Harm Osmers (Germany)

==== Quarter-finals ====
11 April 2024 First leg	Club Brugge (Belgium)	1–0	(Greece) PAOK	Bruges, Belgium
22:00 EET, UTC+02:00	Vetlesen 6'; Thiago (yellow card) 25', (penalty missed) 78'; De Cuyper (yellow card) 83'; Mechele (yellow card) 90'; Skóraś (yellow card) 90+2'	Report	Samatta (yellow card) 49'; Brandon (yellow card) 90'	Stadium: Jan Breydel Stadium; Attendance: 19,917; Referee: Daniel Siebert (Germany)

18 April 2024 Second leg	PAOK (Greece)	0–2 (0–3 agg.)	(Belgium) Club Brugge	Thessaloniki, Greece
22:00 EET, UTC+02:00		Report	Jutglà 33', 45'	Stadium: Toumba Stadium; Attendance: 24,738; Referee: Davide Massa (Italy)

== Statistics ==
=== Squad statistics ===
As of 19 May 2024

Appearances denote players in the starting lineup, with the numbers in parentheses denoting appearances as substitute.

No.	Name	Super League		Greek Cup		Europa Conference League		Total	
No.	Name	Apps	Goals	Apps	Goals	Apps	Goals	Apps	Goals
Goalkeepers
42	(Croatia) Dominik Kotarski	34	0	2	0	16	0	52	0
18	(Serbia) Živko Živković	2	0	4	0	0	0	6	0
64	(Greece) Christos Talichmanidis	0	0	0 (1)	0	0	0	0 (1)	0
Defenders
16	(Poland) Tomasz Kędziora	28 (1)	1	4 (1)	1	12 (2)	1	44 (4)	3
21	(Ghana) Baba Rahman	24 (4)	5	1 (1)	0	12 (2)	1	37 (7)	6
4	(Greece) Konstantinos Koulierakis	20 (2)	1	0 (1)	0	13 (1)	3	33 (4)	4
23	(Spain) Joan Sastre	19 (7)	2	4	1	0	0	23 (7)	3
15	(Nigeria) William Troost-Ekong	10	0	0	0	11 (1)	0	21 (1)	0
55	(Portugal) Rafa Soares	11 (1)	2	4	0	4 (1)	0	19 (2)	2
5	(Greece) Giannis Michailidis	12	1	5	0	3	0	20	1
19	(Spain) Jonny	7 (5)	0	2	0	2 (2)	0	11 (7)	0
3	(Norway) Ivan Näsberg	4 (4)	0	3	1	0	0	7 (4)	1
Midfielders
7	(Greece) Giannis Konstantelias	20 (14)	9	5	2	11 (5)	3	36 (19)	14
22	(Austria) Stefan Schwab	15 (18)	5	6	2	10 (5)	3	31 (23)	10
27	(Russia) Magomed Ozdoyev	25 (9)	6	1 (2)	0	5 (8)	1	31 (19)	7
10	(Austria) Thomas Murg	25 (5)	8	1 (4)	0	4 (7)	1	30 (16)	9
8	(France) Soualiho Meïté	24 (6)	1	1 (4)	0	7	0	32 (10)	1
20	(Portugal) Vieirinha	9 (8)	1	1	0	7 (2)	1	17 (10)	2
6	(Greece) Theocharis Tsingaras	6 (5)	1	4	0	8 (2)	0	18 (7)	1
88	(Brazil) Marcos Antônio	3 (8)	2	4 (1)	1	0 (1)	0	7 (10)	3
38	(Greece) Kyriakos Giaxis	0 (1)	0	0	0	0	0	0 (1)	0
31	(Portugal) André Ricardo	0	0	0 (1)	1	0	0	0 (1)	1
Forwards
71	(Spain) Brandon Thomas	20 (13)	7	4 (2)	1	12 (4)	4	36 (19)	12
11	(Brazil) Taison	24 (5)	5	1 (4)	0	13 (3)	3	38 (12)	8
14	(Serbia) Andrija Živković	19 (10)	10	4 (1)	3	13 (2)	6	36 (13)	19
77	(Bulgaria) Kiril Despodov	19 (14)	11	3 (1)	0	4 (6)	2	26 (21)	13
33	(Tanzania) Mbwana Samatta	13 (16)	2	1 (2)	0	5 (7)	1	19 (25)	3
95	(Greece) Stefanos Tzimas	3 (13)	3	1 (2)	1	0 (4)	0	4 (19)	4
Players transferred out during the season
77	(Germany) Khaled Narey	0 (1)	0	0	0	3 (2)	0	3 (3)	0
50	(Portugal) Filipe Soares	0	0	0	0	1 (2)	0	1 (2)	0
19	(Greece) Lefteris Lyratzis	0 (3)	0	0	0	0	0	0 (3)	0
8	(Brazil) Douglas Augusto	0	0	0	0	1	0	1	0
29	(Greece) Georgios Vrakas	0	0	0	0	0 (1)	0	0 (1)	0

=== Goalscorers ===
As of 19 May 2024

Rank	No.	Pos.	Player	Super League	Greek Cup	Europa Conference League	Total
1	14	FW	(Serbia) A. Živković	10	3	6	19
2	7	MF	(Greece) Konstantelias	9	2	3	14
3	77	FW	(Bulgaria) Despodov	11	0	2	13
4	71	FW	(Spain) Brandon	7	1	4	12
5	22	MF	(Austria) Schwab	5	2	3	10
6	10	MF	(Austria) Murg	8	0	1	9
7	11	MF	(Brazil) Taison	5	0	3	8
8	27	MF	(Russia) Ozdoyev	6	0	1	7
9	21	DF	(Ghana) Baba	5	0	1	6
10	95	FW	(Greece) Tzimas	3	1	0	4
10	4	DF	(Greece) Koulierakis	1	0	3	4
12	33	FW	(Tanzania) Samatta	2	0	1	3
12	23	DF	(Spain) Sastre	2	1	0	3
12	88	MF	(Brazil) Marcos Antônio	2	1	0	3
12	16	DF	(Poland) Kędziora	1	1	1	3
16	55	DF	(Portugal) R. Soares	2	0	0	2
16	20	MF	(Portugal) Vieirinha	1	0	1	2
18	5	DF	(Greece) Michailidis	1	0	0	1
18	6	MF	(Greece) Tsingaras	1	0	0	1
18	8	MF	(France) Meïté	1	0	0	1
18	3	DF	(Norway) Näsberg	0	1	0	1
18	31	MF	(Portugal) André Ricardo	0	1	0	1
Own goals				4	0	4	8
TOTAL				87	14	34	135

=== Most assists ===
As of 19 May 2024

Rank	Pos.	Player	League	Cup	ECL	Total
1	FW	(Serbia) Andrija Živković	8	3	3	14
2	FW	(Brazil) Taison	10	0	3	13
2	FW	(Bulgaria) Kiril Despodov	8	2	3	13
4	MF	(Greece) Giannis Konstantelias	7	2	1	10
5	FW	(Spain) Brandon Thomas	4	0	3	7
6	MF	(Austria) Stefan Schwab	3	0	2	5
7	MF	(Austria) Thomas Murg	4	0	0	4
7	FW	(Tanzania) Mbwana Samatta	4	0	0	4
7	DF	(Ghana) Baba Rahman	3	0	1	4
10	DF	(Spain) Joan Sastre	2	1	0	3

=== Clean sheets ===
As of 19 May 2024

Player	League	Cup	ECL	Total	Games played	Percentage
(Croatia) Dominik Kotarski	12	0	4	16	52	30,77%
(Serbia) Živko Živković	1	4	0	5	6	83,33%
Total	13	4	4	21	58	36,21%

=== Disciplinary record ===
As of 19 May 2024

S	P	N	Name	Super League			Greek Cup			Europa Conference League			Total		
S	P	N	Name	Yellow card	Yellow-red card	Red card	Yellow card	Yellow-red card	Red card	Yellow card	Yellow-red card	Red card	Yellow card	Yellow-red card	Red card
21	DF	(Ghana)	Baba	8	0	0	0	0	0	5	0	0	13	0	0
71	FW	(Spain)	Brandon	7	0	0	1	0	0	4	0	0	12	0	0
4	DF	(Greece)	Koulierakis	6	0	0	1	0	0	3	0	0	10	0	0
8	MF	(France)	Meïté	4	0	0	2	0	0	1	0	1	7	0	1
22	MF	(Austria)	Schwab	5	0	0	1	0	0	2	0	0	8	0	0
10	MF	(Austria)	Murg	5	0	0	1	0	0	2	0	0	8	0	0
14	FW	(Serbia)	A. Živković	8	0	0	0	0	0	0	0	0	8	0	0
11	FW	(Brazil)	Taison	6	0	0	0	0	1	1	0	0	6	0	1
16	DF	(Poland)	Kędziora	6	0	0	0	0	0	0	0	0	6	0	0
5	DF	(Greece)	Michailidis	2	1	0	0	0	0	1	0	0	3	1	0
7	MF	(Greece)	Konstantelias	4	0	0	0	0	0	1	0	0	5	0	0
33	FW	(Tanzania)	Samatta	3	0	0	0	0	0	2	0	0	5	0	0
77	FW	(Bulgaria)	Despodov	3	0	0	1	0	0	1	0	0	5	0	0
15	DF	(Nigeria)	Troost-Ekong	1	0	0	0	0	0	3	0	0	4	0	0
27	MF	(Russia)	Ozdoyev	2	0	0	1	0	0	1	0	0	4	0	0
42	GK	(Croatia)	Kotarski	3	0	0	0	0	0	0	0	0	3	0	0
23	DF	(Spain)	Sastre	3	0	0	0	0	0	0	0	0	3	0	0
20	MF	(Portugal)	Vieirinha	1	0	0	1	0	0	1	0	0	3	0	0
6	MF	(Greece)	Tsingaras	0	0	0	0	0	0	3	0	0	3	0	0
19	DF	(Spain)	Jonny	2	0	0	0	0	0	0	0	0	2	0	0
55	DF	(Portugal)	R. Soares	1	0	0	0	0	0	1	0	0	2	0	0
18	GK	(Serbia)	Z. Živković	1	0	0	1	0	0	0	0	0	2	0	0
Players transferred out during the season
8	MF	(Brazil)	Douglas Augusto	0	0	0	0	0	0	0	0	1	0	0	1

== Awards ==
As has been voted by PAOK fans on official PAOK website and mobile app.

=== Player of the Month award ===
Month	Player	Source
July–August	(Serbia) Andrija Živković	
September	(Serbia) Andrija Živković	
October	(Brazil) Taison	
November	(Brazil) Taison	
December	(Austria) Thomas Murg	
January	(Bulgaria) Kiril Despodov	
February	(Greece) Giannis Konstantelias	
March	(Greece) Konstantinos Koulierakis	
April	(Greece) Giannis Konstantelias	
May	(Brazil) Taison	

=== Season MVP award ===
Player	Source
(Serbia) Andrija Živković	

=== Best Goal of the season award ===
Player	Date	Venue	Opponent	Score	Result	Source
(Brazil) Taison	19 May 2024	Kleanthis Vikelidis Stadium, Thessaloniki	Aris	1–2	1–2	
