= Christos Talichmanidis =

Greek footballer

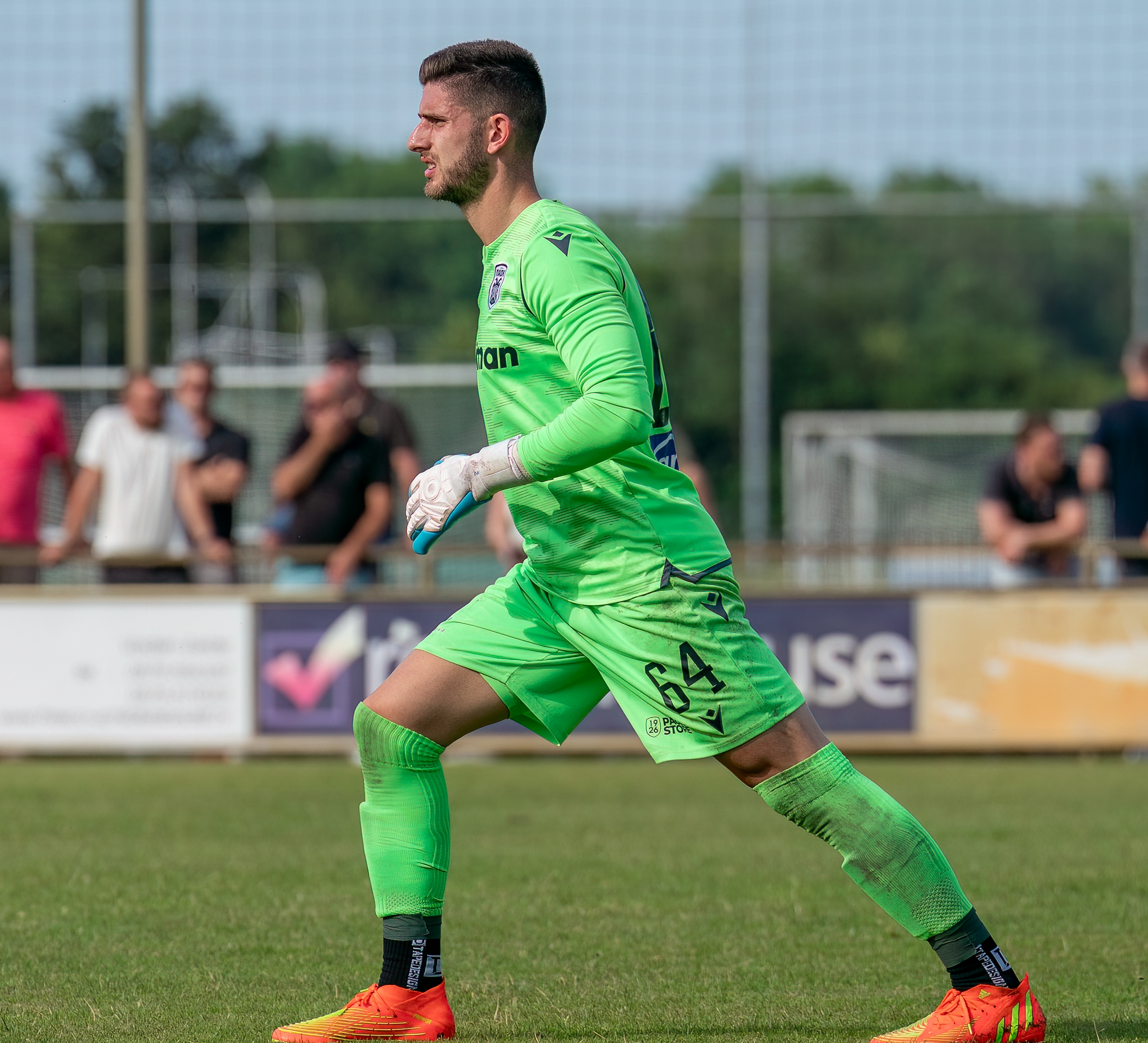
- with PAOK Saloniki, 2023

Personal information
- Date of birth: 16 March 2001 (age 25)
- Place of birth: Thessaloniki, Greece
- Height: 1.87 m (6 ft 2 in)
- Position: Goalkeeper

Team information
- Current team: Olympiakos Nicosia
- Number: 1

Youth career
- 2013–2020: PAOK

Senior career*
Years	Team	Apps	(Gls)
2020–2025	PAOK	1	(0)
2021–2025	PAOK B	28	(0)
2024–2025	→ Makedonikos (loan)	18	(0)
2025–	Olympiakos Nicosia	38	(0)

International career
2017–2018	Greece U17	3	(0)
2022	Greece U21	1	(0)
- * Club domestic league appearances and goals as of 16 October 2026

Christos Talichmanidis (Greek: Χρήστος Ταλιχμανίδης; born 16 March 2001) is a Greek professional footballer who plays as a goalkeeper for Cypriot First Division club Olympiakos Nicosia.

== Career ==
=== Early career ===
In his youth, Talichmanidis expressed desire to be a goalkeeper, likely because his father was also a goalkeeper. Talichmanidis was enrolled at the age of 10 at the Pavlos Melos academy, and in only his second year there he became the leader of the mixed team of Macedonian Football League Championship. In 2013, he joined PAOK, apparently to stay.

Talichmanidis has numerous playing successes. In his youth, he was a key member of the Under-14s MFCA championship-winning side of the 2014–15 season, and he played an influential role in the Under-15s title win, as well as the Under-17s title success in the 2017–18 season. At the age of 17 he became a member of PAOK's Under-19s, with whom he celebrated two league championships and also enjoyed playing two seasons in the UEFA Youth League. At the age of 18, he enrolled in the Department of Accounting and Finance at the University of Macedonia.

Talichmanidis remarked on his game against Barcelona: «I remember everything, but what I will never forget and what was extra special is the game against Barcelona,» he said. Both Talichmanidis and Christos Tzolis celebrated the 2–1 score against Barcelona in Spain in January 2014 as members of PAOK's Under-12 side.

=== PAOK ===
In the summer of 2019, Talichmanidis took part in the senior side's pre-season training. On 31 January 2024, he made his debut in 5–0 victory against Panserraikos for the Greek Cup.

== Career statistics ==
As of 16 October 2026

Club	Season	League			Cup		Continental		Other		Total	
Club	Season	Division	Apps	Goals	Apps	Goals	Apps	Goals	Apps	Goals	Apps	Goals
PAOK B	2021–22	Superleague Greece 2	14	0	—		—		—		14	0
PAOK B	2022–23	Superleague Greece 2	6	0	—		—		—		6	0
PAOK B	2023–24	Superleague Greece 2	8	0	—		—		—		8	0
PAOK B	Total		28	0	—		—		—		28	0
PAOK	2023–24	Superleague Greece	0	0	1	0	0	0	—		1	0
Makedonikos (loan)	2024–25	Superleague Greece 2	18	0	1	0	—		—		19	0
Olympiakos Nicosia	2025–26	Cypriot First Division	33	0	1	0	—		—		34	0
Olympiakos Nicosia	2026–27	Cypriot First Division	5	0	0	0	—		—		5	0
Olympiakos Nicosia	Total		38	0	1	0	0	0	0	0	39	0
Career total			84	0	3	0	0	0	0	0	87	0

== Honours ==
PAOK

- Greek Cup: 2020–21
