= Konstantinos Koulierakis =

Greek footballer (born 2003)

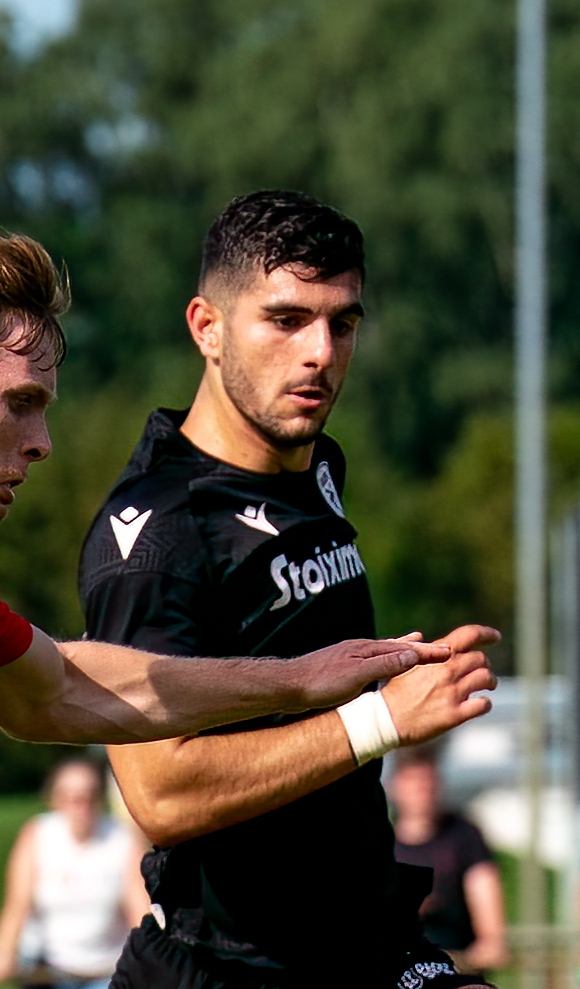
- Koulierakis playing for PAOK in 2023

Personal information
- Date of birth: 28 November 2003 (age 22)
- Place of birth: Chania, Crete, Greece
- Height: 1.88 m (6 ft 2 in)
- Position: Centre-back

Team information
- Current team: Roma
- Number: 3

Youth career
- 2017–2021: PAOK

Senior career*
Years	Team	Apps	(Gls)
2021–2022	PAOK B	22	(0)
2022–2024	PAOK	47	(3)
2024–2026	VfL Wolfsburg	59	(4)
2026–	Roma	6	(0)

International career^{‡}
2019	Greece U16	3	(0)
2019–2020	Greece U17	5	(0)
2021–2022	Greece U19	3	(0)
2022–	Greece	23	(0)
- * Club domestic league appearances and goals as of 07:29, 7 November 2026 (UTC) ‡ National team caps and goals as of 4 October 2026

Konstantinos Koulierakis (Greek: Κωνσταντίνος Κουλιεράκης; born 28 November 2003) is a Greek professional footballer who plays as a centre-back for Serie A club Roma and the Greece national team.

== Club career ==
=== Early career ===
Koulierakis started playing football at Doxa Pachianon at Calcetto F.C. Football Academy in Chania, Crete. He joined PAOK's youth system from Chania in 2017.

=== PAOK ===
During the 2022 preseason, several scouts were impressed with Koulierakis' output in a friendly game against Heerenveen and asked to know his availability, with the club's officials responding with a €15 million price.

Koulierakis made his official debut in a home win against Panetolikos, which ended as a 1–0 win, on 20 August 2022. In his first competitive season with the club, Koulierakis managed to gain a position in the starting line-up, making 31 appearances in all competitions, attracting interest from big European teams, including Fiorentina.

On 14 March 2024, Koulierakis scored a brace in a home match against Dinamo Zagreb along with one assist securing a 5–1 win (5–3 on aggregate) and qualification to the quarter-finals of UEFA Europa Conference League. He was declared man of the match.

=== VfL Wolfsburg ===
On 20 August 2024, Koulierakis signed with VfL Wolfsburg in Germany. The clubs agreed to postpone the transfer until 29 August 2024, after PAOK finished their Europa League play-off games. He scored his first goal for the club in a 2–1 defeat against Borussia Dortmund on 7 February 2026.

=== Roma ===
On 1 August 2026, Koulierakis joined Serie A side Roma.

== Career statistics ==
=== Club ===
As of match played 7 November 2026

Appearances and goals by club, season and competition
Club	Season	League			National cup (Note: Includes Greek Cup, DFB-Pokal)		Europe		Other		Total	
Club	Season	Division	Apps	Goals	Apps	Goals	Apps	Goals	Apps	Goals	Apps	Goals
PAOK B	2021–22	Super League Greece 2	22	0	—		—		—		22	0
PAOK	2022–23	Super League Greece	25	2	6	0	0	0	—		31	2
PAOK	2023–24	Super League Greece	22	1	1	0	14 (Note: Appearances in UEFA Europa Conference League)	3	—		37	4
PAOK	2024–25	Super League Greece	—		—		5 (Note: Appearances in UEFA Champions League)	3	—		5	3
PAOK	Total		47	3	7	0	19	6	—		73	9
VfL Wolfsburg	2024–25	Bundesliga	30	0	3	0	—		—		33	0
VfL Wolfsburg	2025–26	Bundesliga	29	4	2	0	—		2 (Note: Appearances in Bundesliga relegation play-offs)	0	33	4
VfL Wolfsburg	Total		59	4	5	0	—		2	0	66	4
Roma	2026–27	Serie A	6	0	0	0	2	0	—		8	0
Career total			133	7	12	0	21	6	2	0	169	13

=== International ===
As of match played 4 October 2026

Appearances and goals by national team and year
National team	Year	Apps	Goals
Greece	2022	1	0
Greece	2023	4	0
Greece	2024	6	0
Greece	2025	8	0
Greece	2026	4	0
Total		23	0

== Honours ==
PAOK

- Super League Greece: 2023–24

Individual

- Super League Greece Team of the Season: 2022–23, 2023–24
- PAOK Player of the Month: March 2024
