= Taison =

Brazilian footballer (born 1988)

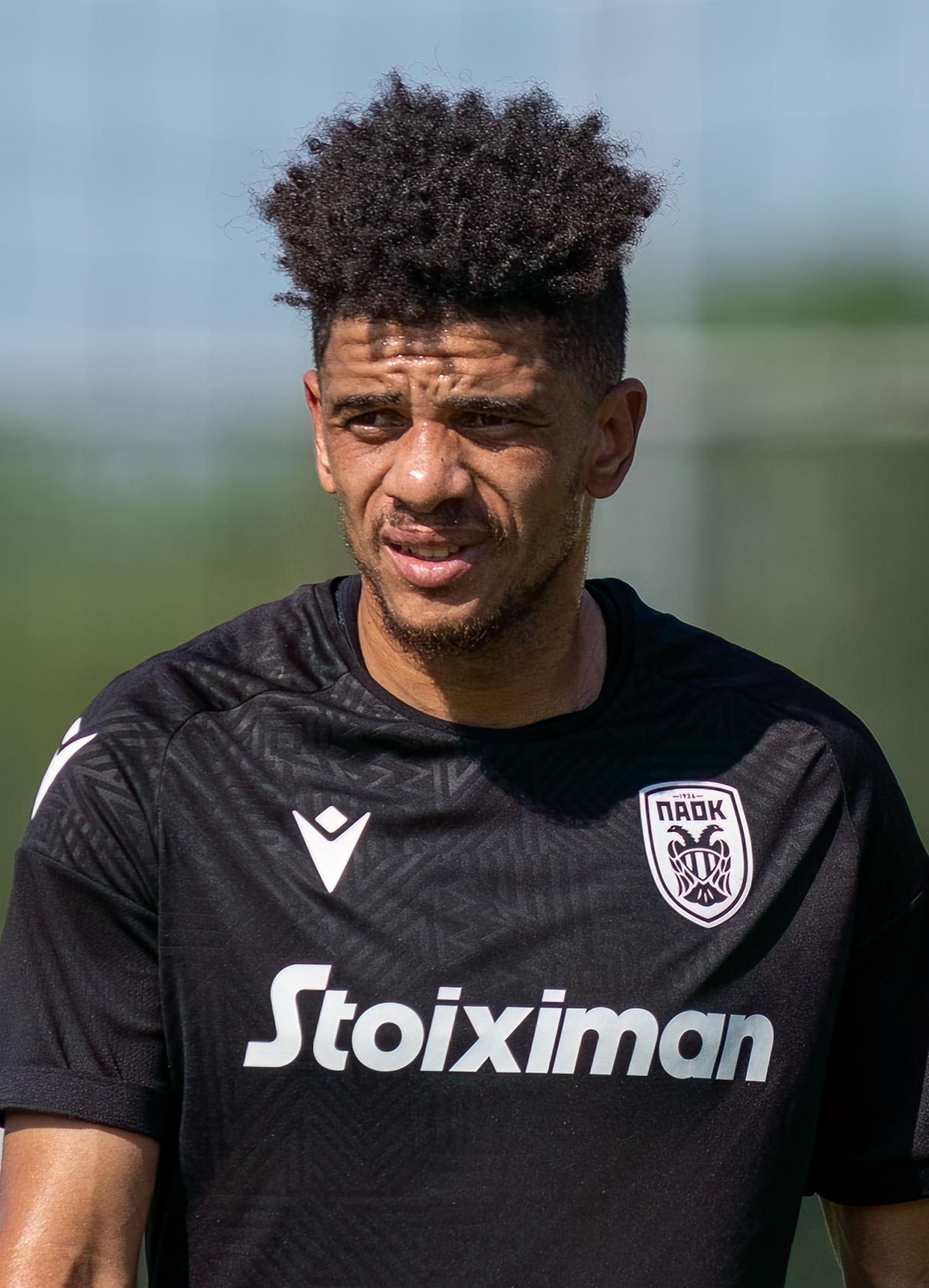
- Taison with PAOK in 2023

Personal information
- Full name: Taison Barcellos Freda
- Date of birth: 13 January 1988 (age 38)
- Place of birth: Pelotas, Brazil
- Height: 1.72 m (5 ft 8 in)
- Positions: Left winger; wide midfielder; attacking midfielder

Team information
- Current team: PAOK
- Number: 11

Senior career*
Years	Team	Apps	(Gls)
2008–2010	Internacional	102	(28)
2010–2012	Metalist Kharkiv	57	(13)
2013–2021	Shakhtar Donetsk	182	(37)
2021–2023	Internacional	41	(7)
2023–	PAOK	100	(14)
2026–	PAOK B	0	(0)

International career^{‡}
2016–2018	Brazil	8	(1)
- * Club domestic league appearances and goals as of 13 September 2026 ‡ National team caps and goals as of 30 May 2019

Taison Barcellos Freda (born 13 January 1988), simply known as Taison, is a Brazilian professional footballer who plays as a left winger or attacking midfielder for Super League Greece club PAOK.

== Club career ==
=== Internacional ===
Taison started his career with Brazilian club Internacional and quickly rose to prominence within their youth set up, becoming one of the brightest prospects at the club. After making his first team debut in 2008, he went on to become an instrumental part of the team, subsequently winning the Copa Sudamericana. His great form continued into the next season, where he won the Campeonato Gaúcho, the Suruga Bank Championship and finished as runner-up in the Copa do Brasil. Taison's first stint at the club reached its conclusion in great fashion with the 2010 Copa Libertadores title.

=== Metalist Kharkiv ===
After being linked with a host of clubs across Europe, including Wolfsburg and Napoli Taison eventually signed for Ukrainian club Metalist Kharkiv for an approximate fee of 6 million euros. He started brightly in Ukraine and even pipped Willian to the "best new signing" accolade. The Brazilian scored an incredible Marco van Basten style volley against Rosenborg BK on 8 November 2012 in the Europa League. In the same game he also provided the assist for the second in a 3–1 win.

=== Shakhtar Donetsk ===
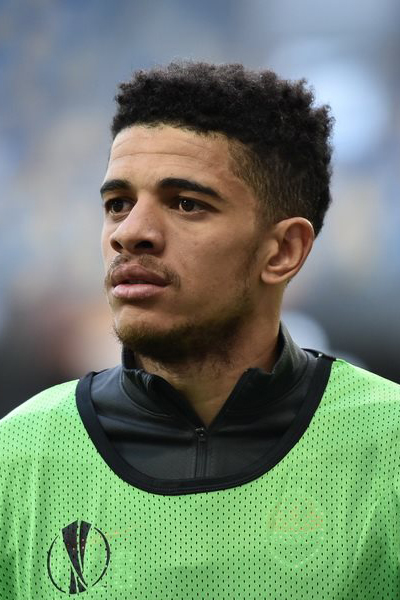
Taison with Shakhtar in 2016

Taison signed with Shakhtar Donetsk on 1 January 2013 for a fee of around £12.4 million. He made his debut for Shakhtar in the Champions League against Borussia Dortmund in a 2–2 draw on 13 February 2013. He scored his first goal for Shakhtar and was named Man of the Match in a 3–3 draw with Metalurh Zaporizhya on 19 May 2013, scoring an equalising goal in the 92nd minute. Taison scored in a 3–0 victory over Chornomorets Odesa in the 2012–13 Ukrainian Cup final. On 10 July 2013 Taison scored in a 3–1 victory over Chornomorets in the Ukrainian Super Cup. In November 2019 he was sent-off after reacting to alleged racist abuse, and was also given a one-match ban.

=== Return to Internacional ===
On 16 April 2021, Internacional announced that Taison would be returning to his boyhood club after 11 years, signing a contract until 2023. The athlete took a significant paycut in order to make the deal happen, refusing more lucrative offers from various other clubs in order to return to Inter.

=== PAOK ===
On 14 January 2023, Taison joined Greek club PAOK for 1.5 years. Taison won the Greek Superleague with PAOK in 2024, with the Brazilian scoring the winning goal against arch rivals Aris Thessaloniki, to win the league for PAOK on the last game of the season.

== International career ==
In an interview with the coach of the Ukraine national team, Mykhaylo Fomenko spoke of him as a possible naturalized. Taison indicated that he would be likely to accept a call-up for Ukraine if asked. But on 22 August 2016, newly appointed manager Tite has called him up for the Brazil national team. On 13 June 2017, Taison scored his first international goal in a match against Australia, that ended 4–0. He scored the 3rd goal of the match.

In May 2018, he was named in Tite’s final 23 man squad for the 2018 World Cup in Russia.

== Career statistics ==
=== Club ===
As of match played 19 April 2025

Appearances and goals by club, season and competition
Club	Season	League			State league (Note: Includes Campeonato Gaúcho)		National cup (Note: Includes Copa do Brasil, Ukrainian Cup, Greek Football Cup)		Continental		Other		Total	
Club	Season	Division	Apps	Goals	Apps	Goals	Apps	Goals	Apps	Goals	Apps	Goals	Apps	Goals
Internacional	2008	Série A	30	2	—		—		6 (Note: Appearances in Copa Sudamericana)	0	—		36	2
Internacional	2009	Série A	28	4	19	15	12	7	2	0	2 (Note: Appearances in Recopa Sudamericana)	0	63	26
Internacional	2010	Série A	11	3	14	4	—		11 (Note: Appearances in Copa Libertadores)	0	—		36	7
Internacional	Total		69	9	33	19	12	7	19	0	2	0	135	35
Metalist Kharkiv	2010–11	Ukrainian Premier League	21	8	—		0	0	6 (Note: Appearances in UEFA Europa League)	1	—		27	9
Metalist Kharkiv	2011–12	Ukrainian Premier League	23	2	—		0	0	13	5	—		36	7
Metalist Kharkiv	2012–13	Ukrainian Premier League	13	3	—		1	0	6	1	—		20	4
Metalist Kharkiv	Total		57	13	—		1	0	25	7	—		83	20
Shakhtar Donetsk	2012–13	Ukrainian Premier League	11	2	—		3	1	2 (Note: Appearances in UEFA Champions League)	0	—		16	3
Shakhtar Donetsk	2013–14	Ukrainian Premier League	19	1	—		4	1	8 (Note: Six appearances and one goal in UEFA Champions League, two appearances in UEFA Europa League)	1	1 (Note: Appearance in Ukrainian Super Cup)	1	32	4
Shakhtar Donetsk	2014–15	Ukrainian Premier League	21	4	—		6	0	8	0	1	0	36	4
Shakhtar Donetsk	2015–16	Ukrainian Premier League	18	6	—		6	1	17 (Note: Nine appearances in UEFA Champions League, eight appearances and one goal in UEFA Europa League)	1	1	0	42	8
Shakhtar Donetsk	2016–17	Ukrainian Premier League	24	5	—		3	1	12 (Note: Ten appearances and four goals in UEFA Champions League, two appearances in UEFA Europa League)	4	1	0	40	10
Shakhtar Donetsk	2017–18	Ukrainian Premier League	24	4	—		3	2	8	1	1	0	36	7
Shakhtar Donetsk	2018–19	Ukrainian Premier League	25	3	—		3	0	7 (Note: Five appearances and two goals in UEFA Champions League, two appearances and one goal in UEFA Europa League)	3	0	0	35	6
Shakhtar Donetsk	2019–20	Ukrainian Premier League	25	10	—		1	0	11 (Note: Five appearances in UEFA Champions League, six appearances and one goal in UEFA Europa League)	1	1	0	38	11
Shakhtar Donetsk	2020–21	Ukrainian Premier League	15	2	—		1	0	7 (Note: Four appearances in UEFA Champions League, three appearances in UEFA Europa League)	0	1	0	24	2
Shakhtar Donetsk	Total		182	37	—		30	6	80	11	7	1	299	55
Internacional	2021	Série A	22	4	—		2	0	5	0	—		29	4
Internacional	2022	Série A	1	0	9	3	0	0	1	0	—		11	3
Internacional	Total		23	4	9	3	2	0	6	0	—		40	7
PAOK	2022–23	Super League Greece	14	1	—		5	1	—		—		19	2
PAOK	2023–24	Super League Greece	29	5	—		5	0	16 (Note: Appearance in UEFA Europa Conference League)	3	—		50	8
PAOK	2024–25	Super League Greece	25	2	—		3	1	14 (Note: Four appearances and two goals in UEFA Champions League, ten appearances and two goals in UEFA Europa League)	4	—		42	7
PAOK	2025–26	Super League Greece	26	6	—		8	0	10	0	—		44	6
PAOK	Total		94	14	—		21	2	40	7	—		155	23
Career total			425	77	42	22	66	15	170	25	9	1	712	140

=== International ===
As of 2 June 2019

Appearances and goals by national team and year
National team	Year	Apps	Goals
Brazil	2016	2	0
Brazil	2017	3	1
Brazil	2018	3	0
Total		8	1

Score and result list Brazil's goal tally first, score column indicates score after Taison goal.

International goal scored by Taison
No.	Date	Venue	Opponent	Score	Result	Competition
1	13 June 2017	Melbourne Cricket Ground, Melbourne, Australia	Australia	3–0	4–0	Friendly

== Honours ==
Internacional

- Copa Libertadores: 2010
- Copa Sudamericana: 2008
- Suruga Bank Championship: 2009
- Campeonato Gaúcho: 2009

Shakhtar Donetsk

- Ukrainian Premier League: 2012–13, 2013–14, 2016–17, 2017–18, 2018–19, 2019–20
- Ukrainian Cup: 2012–13, 2015–16, 2016–17, 2017–18, 2018–19
- Ukrainian Super Cup: 2013, 2014, 2015, 2017

PAOK

- Super League Greece: 2023–24

Individual

- List of 33 Top Players of the Ukrainian Premier League: 2016–17
- Football Stars of Ukraine – Best UPL player: 2019
- Ukrainian Premier League Footballer of the Year: 2019
- Ukrainian Premier League Top Assists Provider: 2019–20
- Ukrainian Premier League Player of Season: 2019–20
- UEFA Europa League Squad of the Season: 2019–20
- PAOK Player of the Month: October 2023, November 2023, May 2024
- PAOK Player of the Season: 2023–24
- PAOK Goal of the Season: 2023–24
