= 2023–24 Super League Greece =

88th season of top-tier football league in Greece

Super League 1
- Season: 2023–24
- Dates: 18 August 2023 – 19 May 2024
- Champions: PAOK; 4th Greek title
- Relegated: A.E. Kifisia; PAS Giannina
- Champions League: PAOK
- Europa League: Olympiacos (as Europa Conference League Winners); Panathinaikos (via domestic cup)
- Conference League: AEK Athens
- Matches: 240
- Goals: 713 (2.97 per match)
- Best player: Ayoub El Kaabi
- Top goalscorer: Loren Morón (20 goals)
- Biggest home win: Panathinaikos 5–0 Atromitos (8 October 2023); Panathinaikos 5–0 Panserraikos (29 October 2023); PAOK 5–0 Panserraikos (25 November 2023)
- Biggest away win: A.E. Kifisia 0–6 PAOK (21 December 2023)
- Highest scoring: A.E. Kifisia 4–4 Panserraikos (17 September 2023)
- Longest winning run: PAOK (7 matches)
- Longest unbeaten run: AEK Athens (22 matches)
- Longest winless run: PAS Giannina (15 matches)
- Longest losing run: Lamia (9 matches)
- Highest attendance: 31,914; Olympiacos 0–3 Panathinaikos (22 October 2023)
- Lowest attendance: 137; Volos 0–2 Aris (11 November 2023)
- Total attendance: 1,290,793
- Average attendance: 7,683

The 2023–24 Super League Greece, also known as Stoiximan Super League for sponsorship reasons, was the 88th season of the Super League Greece, the top Greek professional league for association football clubs, since its establishment in 1959. The draw for the fixtures was announced on 17 July 2023. AEK Athens were the defending champions.

On 5 December, the league referees announced a collective hiatus from refereeing indefinitely, citing the attacks on the home of referee Andreas Gamaris and his family's store, as well as the threats made by ultras of Olympiacos to Anastasios Papapetrou and his family, following his controversial refereeing as "tipping points"; they called for better protection of the referees. The strike eventually ended on 13 December.

On 11 December, the government announced its decision to hold all Super League games behind closed doors for the next two months, i.e. until 12 February 2024, as a measure to combat fan violence. A package of new measures was decided after the serious injury and later death of a police officer that was hit by a naval flare during the incidents that took place outside the stadium, during the volleyball match between Olympiacos and Panathinaikos in Rentis. The next day, after a motion of no confidence was submitted to the League's board of directors, Vangelis Marinakis resigned as president of the League.

PAOK won the 4th title in their history on 19 May 2024, after defeating arch-rivals Aris 2–1, away from home in the last matchday of the play-offs, thus sealing the championship, the first since the 2018–19 season.

== Teams ==
Fourteen teams competed in the league – the top twelve teams from the previous season and two teams promoted from Super League 2. Panserraikos played in the Super League for the first time since the 2010–11 season. A.E. Kifisia played in the Super League for the first time in their history.

Promoted from 2022–23 Super League Greece 2	Relegated from 2022–23 Super League Greece
Panserraikos; A.E. Kifisia	Ionikos; Levadiakos

=== Way of conduct ===
The championship was held in two phases, namely the regular season (phase 1) and the play-offs with the top 6 teams and play-outs round with the bottom 8 teams (phase 2). In the regular season 26 matches were played in 2 rounds of 13 match days each, where in each round all teams competed against all others based on a draw. After the end of the regular season the teams ranked 1 through 6 participated in the play-offs and the teams ranked 7 through 14 participated in the play-outs, keeping (both in the play-offs and in the play-outs) the total points that they won during the regular season.

The play-offs were held in ten game days, i.e. in two rounds of five games each where in each round all teams competed against all others, based on a draw. The champion was declared the team (of those that participated in the play-offs) that after the completion of the play-offs had the highest score (that is, it had accumulated the most points during the regular season and the play-offs combined). In the same way (sum of points in the regular season and in the play-offs) the other positions of the championship (2nd, 3rd etc.) was determined from which the teams that participated in the UEFA Competitions emerged.

The play-outs were held over seven game days i.e. one single round in which all teams competed against all others, based on a draw. The teams ranked 7th, 8th, 9th and 10th in the regular season competed in four home and three away games in the play-outs while the other teams competed in three home games and four away games in the play-outs, based on a draw. Positions 7 through 14 were determined by the total points the teams participating in the play-outs earned cumulatively during the regular season and the play-outs. The last two teams were relegated to Super League 2.

Locations of the 2023–24 Super League Greece teams

=== Stadiums and locations ===
Note: Table lists in alphabetical order.

Team	Location	Stadium	Capacity	2022–23
AEK Athens	Athens (Nea Filadelfeia)	Agia Sophia Stadium	31,100	1st
A.E. Kifisia	Athens (Kaisariani)	Michalis Kritikopoulos Stadium	4,851	1st (South Group SL2)
Aris	Thessaloniki (Charilaou)	Kleanthis Vikelidis Stadium	22,800	5th
Asteras Tripolis	Tripoli	Theodoros Kolokotronis Stadium	7,442	10th
Atromitos	Athens (Peristeri)	Peristeri Stadium	10,050	8th
Lamia	Lamia	Lamia Stadium	5,500	12th
OFI	Heraklion	Theodoros Vardinogiannis Stadium	9,088	7th
Olympiacos	Piraeus	Karaiskakis Stadium	32,115	3rd
Panathinaikos	Athens (Ampelokipoi)	Leoforos Alexandras Stadium	16,003	2nd
Panetolikos	Agrinio	Panetolikos Stadium	7,321	11th
Panserraikos	Serres	Serres Municipal Stadium	9,500	1st (North Group SL2)
PAOK	Thessaloniki (Toumba)	Toumba Stadium	28,703	4th
PAS Giannina	Ioannina	Zosimades Stadium	7,652	9th
Volos	Volos	Panthessaliko Stadium	22,700	6th

=== Personnel, kits and TV channel ===
Team	Manager	Captain	Kit manufacturer	Shirt sponsor (chest)	Shirt sponsor (sleeve)	Broadcast channel
AEK Athens	(Argentina) Matías Almeyda	(Argentina) Sergio Araujo	Nike	Pame Stoixima	Piraeus Bank	Cosmote TV
A.E. Kifisia	(Greece) Kostas Bratsos	(Greece) Antonis Papasavvas	Lotto	Novibet	Leasing Planet	Cosmote TV
Aris	(Greece) Akis Mantzios	(Spain) Julián Cuesta	Kappa	Novibet	Miraval	Nova Sports
Asteras Tripolis	(Serbia) Milan Rastavac	(Argentina) Juan Munafo	Macron	Intrakat	Volton	Nova Sports
Atromitos	(Serbia) Saša Ilić	(Greece) Kyriakos Kivrakidis	Capelli	Novibet	Xmoto	Nova Sports
Lamia	(Greece) Leonidas Vokolos	(Greece) Adam Tzanetopoulos	Macron	Interwetten	Interkat	Cosmote TV
OFI	(Greece) Traianos Dellas	(Greece) Kostas Giannoulis	Puma	OPAP	Zaros	Cosmote TV
Olympiacos	(Spain) José Luis Mendilibar	(Greece) Kostas Fortounis	Adidas	Stoiximan	Shopflix.gr	Cosmote TV
Panathinaikos	(Greece) Christos Kontis	(Netherlands) Bart Schenkeveld	Adidas	Stoiximan	Avance	Cosmote TV
Panetolikos	(Greece) Giannis Petrakis	(Greece) Nikos Karelis	Givova	Novibet	Avance	Cosmote TV
Panserraikos	(Uruguay) Pablo García	(Greece) Stavros Petavrakis	Macron	Novibet	Avance	Nova Sports
PAOK	(Romania) Răzvan Lucescu	(Portugal) Vieirinha	Macron	Stoiximan	Millionero	Nova Sports
PAS Giannina	(Greece) Giorgos Georgoulopoulos	(Spain) Pedro Conde	Puma	Novibet	Novibet	Nova Sports
Volos	(Spain) Joaquín Gómez	(Greece) Tasos Tsokanis	Admiral	Novibet	Volton	Cosmote TV

=== Managerial changes ===
Team	Outgoing manager	Manner of departure	Date of vacancy	Position in table	Incoming manager	Date of appointment
Asteras Tripolis	(Greece) Akis Mantzios	End of contract	13 May 2023	Pre-season	(Serbia) Milan Rastavac	31 May 2023
Olympiacos	(France) José Anigo (caretaker)	End of tenure as caretaker	14 May 2023	Pre-season	(Spain) Diego Martínez	14 June 2023
Panetolikos	(Greece) Giannis Anastasiou	End of contract	24 May 2023	Pre-season	(Argentina) Gabriel Schürrer	1 June 2023
A.E. Kifisia	(Greece) Giorgos Petrakis	End of contract	17 June 2023	Pre-season	(Greece) Giannis Anastasiou	27 June 2023
Panserraikos	(Greece) Pavlos Dermitzakis	End of contract	19 June 2023	Pre-season	(Uruguay) Pablo García	20 June 2023
Aris	(Greece) Apostolos Terzis	Resigned	27 August 2023	12th	(Greece) Akis Mantzios	29 August 2023
Panetolikos	(Argentina) Gabriel Schürrer	Sacked	3 October 2023	13th	(Greece) Giannis Petrakis	4 October 2023
Atromitos	(Wales) Chris Coleman	Sacked	8 October 2023	12th	(Greece) Georgios Korakakis (caretaker)	11 October 2023
Atromitos	(Greece) Georgios Korakakis (caretaker)	End of tenure as caretaker	23 October 2023	13th	(Serbia) Saša Ilić	24 October 2023
Volos	(Greece) Kostas Bratsos	Sacked	15 November 2023	13th	(Spain) Ángel López	16 November 2023
Olympiacos	(Spain) Diego Martínez	Sacked	4 December 2023	4th	(Portugal) Carlos Carvalhal	5 December 2023
OFI	(Lithuania) Valdas Dambrauskas	Sacked	4 December 2023	8th	(Portugal) Pedro Caravela (caretaker)	5 December 2023
A.E. Kifisia	(Greece) Giannis Anastasiou	Sacked	5 December 2023	14th	(Greece) Epaminondas Koutromanos (caretaker)	6 December 2023
A.E. Kifisia	(Greece) Epaminondas Koutroumanos (caretaker)	End of tenure as caretaker	7 December 2023	14th	(Denmark) David Nielsen	8 December 2023
OFI	(Portugal) Pedro Caravela (caretaker)	End of tenure as caretaker	14 December 2023	8th	(Spain) Pepe Mel	15 December 2023
PAS Giannina	(Greece) Thanasis Staikos	Sacked	16 December 2023	14th	(Greece) Michalis Grigoriou	17 December 2023
Panathinaikos	(Serbia) Ivan Jovanović	Sacked	25 December 2023	2nd	(Turkey) Fatih Terim	26 December 2023
A.E. Kifisia	(Denmark) David Nielsen	Sacked	29 January 2024	14th	(Greece) Kostas Bratsos	30 January 2024
Olympiacos	(Portugal) Carlos Carvalhal	Sacked	8 February 2024	4th	(Greece) Sotiris Sylaidopoulos (caretaker)	8 February 2024
Olympiacos	(Greece) Sotiris Sylaidopoulos (caretaker)	End of tenure as caretaker	11 February 2024	4th	(Spain) José Luis Mendilibar	11 February 2024
OFI	(Spain) Pepe Mel	Sacked	12 February 2024	10th	(Greece) Traianos Dellas	12 February 2024
Volos	(Spain) Ángel López	Sacked	21 February 2024	12th	(Greece) Christos Kontis	22 February 2024
PAS Giannina	(Greece) Michalis Grigoriou	Resigned	21 April 2024	14th	(Greece) Giorgos Georgoulopoulos (caretaker)	22 April 2024
Panathinaikos	(Turkey) Fatih Terim	Sacked	15 May 2024	4th	(Greece) Christos Kontis (caretaker)	17 May 2024
Volos	(Greece) Christos Kontis	Resigned	16 May 2024	12th	(Spain) Joaquín Gómez	10 June 2024

== League table ==
Pos	Team	Pld	W	D	L	GF	GA	GD	Pts	Qualification or relegation
1	PAOK	26	19	3	4	66	21	+45	60	Qualification for the Play-off round
2	AEK Athens	26	17	8	1	60	25	+35	59	Qualification for the Play-off round
3	Olympiacos	26	18	3	5	58	24	+34	57	Qualification for the Play-off round
4	Panathinaikos	26	17	5	4	62	21	+41	56	Qualification for the Play-off round
5	Aris	26	12	6	8	39	29	+10	42	Qualification for the Play-off round
6	Lamia	26	9	7	10	35	44	−9	34	Qualification for the Play-off round
7	Asteras Tripolis	26	9	4	13	36	46	−10	31	Qualification for the Play-out round
8	Atromitos	26	6	10	10	29	44	−15	28	Qualification for the Play-out round
9	Panserraikos	26	6	9	11	28	45	−17	27	Qualification for the Play-out round
10	OFI	26	5	10	11	26	44	−18	25	Qualification for the Play-out round
11	A.E. Kifisia	26	4	9	13	31	56	−25	21	Qualification for the Play-out round
12	Panetolikos	26	4	8	14	26	46	−20	20	Qualification for the Play-out round
13	Volos	26	4	7	15	24	52	−28	19	Qualification for the Play-out round
14	PAS Giannina	26	3	9	14	25	48	−23	18	Qualification for the Play-out round

Source: Super League Greece
Rules for classification: 1) Points; 2) Head-to-head points; 3) Head-to-head goal difference; 4) Goal difference; 5) Goals scored; 6) Play-offs (neutral ground).
(Note: Criterion 6 is only used if needed to decide champion, teams for relegation or teams for UEFA competitions).

== Results ==
Home \ Away	AEK	KIF	ARIS	AST	ATR	LAM	OFI	OLY	PAO	PNE	PNS	PAOK	PAS	VOL
AEK Athens	—	3–0	1–0	4–2	2–1	3–0	3–0	1–1	2–2	3–0	1–1	2–0	4–2	3–0
A.E. Kifisia	1–1	—	0–1	1–3	2–1	1–1	0–0	2–3	0–1	2–2	4–4	0–6	4–2	3–0 (Note: The match originally finished 0-0. On March 4 it was awarded to A.E. Kifisia with 3–0, after the racist attack of the president of Volos to Andrews Tetteh.)
Aris	3–3	1–1	—	3–2	1–3	2–2	1–0	1–2	2–0	3–0	1–0	2–1	2–0	2–0
Asteras Tripolis	0–3	3–3	3–2	—	3–1	0–1	3–0	0–2	1–4	2–2	1–0	1–4	2–2	1–0
Atromitos	0–5	3–0	0–2	0–0	—	3–1	1–1	0–0	3–2	3–2	1–1	0–2	1–1	1–1
Lamia	1–3	4–1	1–0	2–1	3–3	—	2–2	1–0	1–2	1–0	0–2	0–2	2–1	1–2
OFI	2–0	1–2	3–2	0–2	1–1	1–1	—	0–2	2–2	1–0	4–0	1–0	1–1	1–1
Olympiacos	1–2	4–0	4–1	2–1	4–0	4–0	4–0	—	0–3 (Note: The match was suspended at the 51st minute while the score at 1–1, after the injury of Panathinaikos' player, Juankar due to a firecracker burst next to him and was transferred to the hospital. The court awarded the game 0–3 in favor of Panathinaikos. Initially, the juridicial decision was to deduct 1 point from Olympiacos, but this was overruled by CAS on 29 February 2024.)	3–1	2–0	2–4	3–1	3–0
Panathinaikos	1–2	1–1	2–0	2–0	5–0	2–2	4–0	2–0	—	2–1	5–0	2–2	2–0	3–0
Panetolikos	2–2	3–0	0–4	0–1	1–0	1–2	1–1	1–2	0–5	—	3–2	1–3	0–0	2–0
Panserraikos	2–2	1–1	1–1	2–1	0–0	2–0	2–1	0–1	0–3	1–1	—	0–2	3–2	2–2
PAOK	1–1	2–1	0–0	3–0	2–0	3–0	4–0	1–4	2–1	2–1	5–0	—	4–0	3–0
PAS Giannina	0–1	3–0	0–0	2–1	1–1	1–4	2–2	0–3	0–1	0–0	0–2	1–3	—	1–1
Volos	2–3	2–1	0–2	1–2	1–2	2–2	3–1	2–2	0–3	1–1	1–0	1–5	1–2	—

Source: Super League Greece
Legend: Blue = home team win; Yellow = draw; Red = away team win.
For upcoming matches, an "a" indicates there is an article about the rivalry between the two participants.

== Positions by round ==
The table lists the positions of teams after each week of matches. To preserve chronological evolvements, any postponed matches are not included in the round at which they were originally scheduled, but added to the full round they were played immediately afterwards. For example, if a match is scheduled for round 13, but then postponed and played between rounds 16 and 17, it will be added to the standings for round 16. Juridical decisions regarding a match are also added to the full round after which they were ruled.

Team ╲ Round	1	2	3	4	5	6	7	8	9	10	11	12	13	14	15	16	17	18	19	20	21	22	23	24	25	26
PAOK	1	2	3	3	2	2	2	3	4	4	4	4	3	1	1	1	3	1	1	1	1	1	2	2	2	1
AEK Athens	7	8	6	6	4	4	5	4	3	3	3	3	2	2	4	3	2	3	3	2	2	3	1	1	1	2
Olympiacos	3	1	1	1	1	1	1	2	2	2	2	2	4	4	3	4	4	4	4	4	4	4	4	4	4	3
Panathinaikos	9	5	2	2	3	3	3	1	1	1	1	1	1	3	2	2	1	2	2	3	3	2	3	3	3	4
Aris	11	12	8	9	6	7	7	7	6	6	5	5	5	5	5	5	5	5	5	5	5	5	5	5	5	5
Lamia	5	4	7	7	10	9	9	6	5	5	6	6	7	7	7	7	8	8	7	7	6	6	6	6	6	6
Asteras Tripolis	13	6	9	8	7	8	8	9	9	9	9	8	6	6	6	6	6	6	6	6	7	7	7	7	7	7
Atromitos	8	14	14	14	13	13	12	13	12	10	10	10	10	9	8	8	7	7	8	8	9	9	10	10	8	8
Panserraikos	12	10	12	11	8	5	6	8	8	8	8	9	9	11	11	11	10	9	9	9	8	8	9	9	10	9
OFI	4	7	4	4	5	6	4	5	7	7	7	7	8	8	9	9	9	10	10	10	10	10	8	8	9	10
A.E. Kifisia	14	13	10	10	11	11	10	10	10	11	11	12	14	12	13	13	14	14	14	14	13	13	14	14	13	11
Panetolikos	10	9	11	13	12	12	13	11	11	14	14	14	12	13	12	12	11	11	11	12	12	11	11	11	12	12
Volos	6	11	13	12	14	14	14	14	14	13	13	11	11	10	10	10	12	12	12	11	11	12	12	13	11	13
PAS Giannina	2	3	5	5	9	10	11	12	13	12	12	13	13	14	14	14	13	13	13	13	14	14	13	12	14	14

Leader and Play-off round
Play-off round
Play-out round

Source: Super League Greece

== Play-off round ==
The top six teams from the regular season will meet twice (10 matches per team) for places in the 2024–25 UEFA Champions League, 2024–25 UEFA Conference League, and potentially 2024–25 UEFA Europa League (depending on Greek Cup), as well as deciding the league champion.

Pos	Team	Pld	W	D	L	GF	GA	GD	Pts	Qualification
1	PAOK (C)	36	25	5	6	87	34	+53	80	Qualification for the Champions League second qualifying round
2	AEK Athens	36	23	9	4	80	35	+45	78	Qualification for the Conference League second qualifying round
3	Olympiacos	36	23	5	8	78	36	+42	74	Qualification for the Europa League league phase (Note: Olympiacos qualified for the Europa League league phase as 2023–24 UEFA Europa Conference League winners.)
4	Panathinaikos	36	22	6	8	82	37	+45	72	Qualification for the Europa League second qualifying round (Note: Panathinaikos qualified for the Europa League second qualifying round as 2023–24 Greek Cup winners.)
5	Aris	36	16	7	13	51	44	+7	55	
6	Lamia	36	9	8	19	43	79	−36	35	

Source: Super League Greece
Rules for classification: 1) Points; 2) Head-to-head points (Regular season and play-off); 3) Head-to-head goal difference (Regular season and play-off); 4) Regular season position.
(C) Champions

=== Results ===
Home \ Away	PAOK	AEK	OLY	PAO	ARIS	LAM
PAOK	—	3–2	2–0	4–1	0–1	3–1
AEK Athens	2–2	—	1–0	3–0	2–0	3–0
Olympiacos	2–1	2–0	—	1–3	3–0	4–1
Panathinaikos	2–3	2–1	2–2	—	0–1	3–1
Aris	1–2	1–2	1–1	0–2	—	3–1
Lamia	1–1	0–4	1–5	0–5	2–4	—

Source: Super League Greece
Legend: Blue = home team win; Yellow = draw; Red = away team win.
For upcoming matches, an "a" indicates there is an article about the rivalry between the two participants.

=== Play-off round positions by round ===
Team ╲ Round	26	27	28	29	30	31	32	33	34	35	36
PAOK	1	2	2	1	1	3	3	2	2	1	1
AEK Athens	2	1	1	2	2	1	1	1	1	2	2
Olympiacos	3	4	4	4	4	4	4	4	4	3	3
Panathinaikos	4	3	3	3	3	2	2	3	3	4	4
Aris	5	5	5	5	5	5	5	5	5	5	5
Lamia	6	6	6	6	6	6	6	6	6	6	6

Champion and Champions League second qualifying round
Conference League second qualifying round
Europa League league phase
Europa League second qualifying round

Source: Super League Greece

== Play-out round ==
The bottom eight teams met once (seven matches per team) to avoid relegation. The bottom two were relegated.

Pos	Team	Pld	W	D	L	GF	GA	GD	Pts	Relegation
7	Panserraikos	33	9	11	13	37	53	−16	38	
8	Asteras Tripolis	33	11	5	17	40	55	−15	38	
9	Panetolikos	33	9	9	15	36	49	−13	36	
10	OFI	33	7	14	12	36	50	−14	35	
11	Atromitos	33	7	13	13	36	53	−17	34	
12	Volos	33	8	9	16	36	58	−22	33	
13	A.E. Kifisia (R)	33	6	10	17	38	68	−30	28	Relegation to Super League 2
14	PAS Giannina (R)	33	4	11	18	33	62	−29	23	Relegation to Super League 2

Source: Super League Greece
Rules for classification: 1) Points; 2) Head-to-head points (Regular season and play-off); 3) Head-to-head goal difference (Regular season and play-off); 4) Regular season position.
(R) Relegated

=== Results ===
Home \ Away	PNS	AST	PNE	OFI	ATR	VOL	KIF	PAS
Panserraikos	—	2–0	—	2–2	—	—	2–0	2–1
Asteras Tripolis	—	—	0–2	1–1	—	0–2	1–2	—
Panetolikos	3–0	—	—	—	1–0	0–1	—	—
OFI	—	—	1–2	—	0–0	2–1	—	4–0
Atromitos	1–1	0–1	—	—	—	—	1–2	3–2
Volos	1–0	—	—	—	2–2	—	4–1	—
A.E. Kifisia	—	—	0–1	0–0	—	—	—	2–3
PAS Giannina	—	0–1	1–1	—	—	1–1	—	—

Legend: Blue = home team win; Yellow = draw; Red = away team win.
For upcoming matches, an "a" indicates there is an article about the rivalry between the two participants.

=== Play-out round positions by round ===
Team ╲ Round	26	27	28	29	30	31	32	33
Panserraikos	9	9	9	9	10	7	7	7
Asteras Tripolis	7	7	8	8	9	10	8	8
Panetolikos	12	11	12	13	12	12	11	9
OFI	10	10	10	10	7	8	9	10
Atromitos	8	8	7	7	8	9	10	11
Volos	13	13	11	11	11	11	12	12
A.E. Kifisia	11	12	13	12	13	13	13	13
PAS Giannina	14	14	14	14	14	14	14	14

Relegation to 2024–25 Super League Greece 2

Source: Super League Greece

== Season statistics ==
=== Top scorers ===
Rank	Player	Club	Goals
1	(Spain) Loren Morón	Aris	20
2	(Morocco) Ayoub El Kaabi	Olympiacos	17
3	(Serbia) Ognjen Ožegović	A.E. Kifisia	16
4	(Argentina) Ezequiel Ponce	AEK Athens	15
4	(Greece) Fotis Ioannidis	Panathinaikos	15
6	(Trinidad and Tobago) Levi García	AEK Athens	13
6	(Argentina) Juan Miritello	Asteras Tripolis	13
8	(Bulgaria) Kiril Despodov	PAOK	11
8	(Portugal) Daniel Podence	Olympiacos	11
10	(Serbia) Andrija Živković	PAOK	10
10	(Brazil) Bernard	Panathinaikos	10
10	(Spain) Carlitos	Lamia	10

==== Hat-tricks ====
Player	For	Against	Result	Date
(Brazil) Bernard	Panathinaikos	Panetolikos	5–0 (A)	16 September 2023
(Argentina) Ezequiel Ponce	AEK Athens	Atromitos	5–0 (A)	21 January 2024

== Awards ==
=== Stoiximan Player of the Month ===
Month	Player	Club	Ref
August	(Greece) Georgios Masouras	Olympiacos	
September	(Morocco) Ayoub El Kaabi	Olympiacos	
October	(Sweden) Niclas Eliasson	AEK Athens	
November	(Spain) Loren Morón	Aris	
December	(Bulgaria) Kiril Despodov	PAOK	
January	(Bulgaria) Kiril Despodov	PAOK	
February	(Argentina) Ezequiel Ponce	AEK Athens	
March	(Spain) Loren Morón	Aris	
April	(Argentina) Santiago Hezze	Olympiacos	
May	(Brazil) Taison	PAOK	

=== Stoiximan Player of the Club ===
Club	MVP	Ref
PAOK	(Brazil) Taison	
AEK Athens	(Sweden) Niclas Eliasson	
Olympiacos	(Morocco) Ayoub El Kaabi	
Panathinaikos	(Greece) Fotis Ioannidis	
Aris	(Spain) Loren Morón	
Lamia	(Spain) Carlitos	
Panserraikos	(Greece) Panagiotis Deligiannidis	
Asteras Tripolis	(Argentina) Juan Miritello	
Panetolikos	(Greece) Georgios Liavas	
OFI	(Montenegro) Marko Bakić	
Atromitos	(Greece) Panagiotis Tsintotas	
Volos	(Argentina) Juan Manuel Garcia	
A.E. Kifisia	(Serbia) Ognjen Ožegović	
PAS Giannina	(Spain) Pedro Conde	

=== Stoiximan Player of the Season ===
Player	Club	Votes	Ref
(Morocco) Ayoub El Kaabi	Olympiacos	59.26%	

=== Stoiximan Goal of the Season ===
Player	Club	Match	Votes	Ref
(Portugal) Daniel Podence	Olympiacos	vs PAOK 1–2 (Matchday 23)	83.59%	

=== Stoiximan Best Goal ===
Matchday	Player	Club	Ref
Regular Season
1st	(Spain) Loren Morón	Aris	
2nd	(Serbia) Mijat Gaćinović	AEK Athens	
3rd	(Switzerland) Steven Zuber	AEK Athens	
4th	(Morocco) Ayoub El Kaabi	Olympiacos	
5th	(Spain) Loren Morón	Aris	
6th	(Greece) Fotis Ioannidis	Panathinaikos	
7th	(Spain) Loren Morón	Aris	
8th	(Switzerland) Steven Zuber	AEK Athens	
9th	(Mexico) Orbelín Pineda	AEK Athens	
10th	(Russia) Magomed Ozdoyev	PAOK	
11th	(Tanzania) Ally Samatta	PAOK	
12th	(Greece) Kostas Fortounis	Olympiacos	
13th	(Spain) Aitor Cantalapiedra	Panathinaikos	
14th	(Sweden) Niclas Eliasson	AEK Athens	
15th	(Sweden) Alexander Jeremejeff	Panathinaikos	
16th	(Spain) Brandon Thomas	PAOK	
17th	(Trinidad and Tobago) Levi García	AEK Athens	
18th	(Greece) Georgios Masouras	Olympiacos	
19th	(Bulgaria) Kiril Despodov	PAOK	
20th	(Argentina) Ezequiel Ponce	AEK Athens	
21st	(Greece) Giannis Konstantelias	PAOK	
22nd	(Greece) Kostas Fortounis	Olympiacos	
23rd	(Portugal) Daniel Podence	Olympiacos	
24th	(Switzerland) Steven Zuber	AEK Athens	
25th	(Greece) Panagiotis Tzimas	PAS Giannina	
26th	(Greece) Giannis Fetfatzidis	Aris	
Play-offs
1st & 2nd	(Trinidad and Tobago) Levi García	AEK Athens	
3rd & 4th	(Portugal) Daniel Podence	Olympiacos	
5th & 6th	(Argentina) Ezequiel Ponce	AEK Athens	
7th & 8th & 9th	(Spain) Loren Morón	Aris	
Play-outs
1st & 2nd	(Greece) Georgios Pamlidis	PAS Giannina	
3rd & 4th	(Montenegro) Marko Bakić	OFI	
5th & 6th	(Spain) Jon Toral	OFI	
Play-offs & Play-outs
10th & 7th	(Spain) Loren Morón	Aris	

=== Annual awards ===
Annual awards were announced on 9 December 2024.

Award	Winner	Club
Greek Player of the Season	(Greece) Fotis Ioannidis	Panathinaikos
Foreign Player of the Season	(Morocco) Ayoub El Kaabi	Olympiacos
Young Player of the Season	(Greece) Giannis Konstantelias	PAOK
Goalkeeper of the Season	(Croatia) Dominik Kotarski	PAOK
Golden Boot	(Spain) Loren Morón	Aris
Manager of the Season	(Romania) Răzvan Lucescu	PAOK

Team of the Season
Goalkeeper	(Croatia) Dominik Kotarski (PAOK)			
Defence	(Brazil) Rodinei (Olympiacos)	(Croatia) Domagoj Vida (AEK Athens)	(Greece) Konstantinos Koulierakis (PAOK)	(Ghana) Baba Rahman (PAOK)
Midfield	(Sweden) Niclas Eliasson (AEK Athens)	(Portugal) Chiquinho (Olympiacos)	(Mexico) Orbelín Pineda (AEK Athens)	(Greece) Giannis Konstantelias (PAOK)
Attack	(Greece) Fotis Ioannidis (Panathinaikos) / (Spain) Loren Morón (Aris)		(Morocco) Ayoub El Kaabi (Olympiacos)	

== Attendances ==
=== Overall ===
As of 19 May 2024

Pos	Team	Total	High	Low	Average	Change
1	AEK Athens (14)	384,082	31,914	22,080	27,434	n/a
2	Olympiacos (12)	286,695	31,500	14,627	23,891	n/a
3	PAOK (13)	183,421	22,281	5,800	14,109	n/a
4	Panathinaikos (14)	144,107	13,521	7,546	10,293	n/a
5	Aris (14)	89,455	18,644		6,390	n/a
6	OFI (13)	55,869	5,100		4,298	n/a
7	PAS Giannina (11)	28,085	4,534		2,553	n/a
8	Lamia (12)	26,481	4,405		2,207	n/a
9	Asteras Tripolis (12)	25,127	4,135		2,094	n/a
10	Panetolikos (11)	19,684	3,708		1,789	n/a
11	Atromitos (11)	14,149	2,632		1,286	n/a
12	Panserraikos (11)	11,325	2,414	406	1,030	n/a^{1}
13	A.E. Kifisia (11)	11,297	2,670	187	1,027	n/a^{1}
14	Volos (9)	11,016	5,177	137	1,224	n/a
	League total	1,290,793	31,914	137	7,683	n/a

Updated to match(es) played on 19 May 2024. Source: Super League Greece
Notes:
1: Team was promoted from the 2022–23 Super League Greece 2.

=== Home matches played ===
Team \ Match played	Regular season													Play-off & play-out					Total
Team \ Match played	1	2	3	4	5	6	7	8	9	10	11	12	13	1	2	3	4	5	Total
AEK Athens	25,231	22,080	29,421	25,045	30,452	24,502	26,810	—	—	—	—	26,325	22,523	31,100	31,080	27,313	31,100	31,100	384,082 (14)
Aris	5,805	6,129	5,581	4,719	5,917	5,423	7,313	—	—	—	—	3,765	7,445	3,885	7,503	3,793	3,533	18,644	89,455 (14)
Asteras Tripolis	1,573	1,369	4,348	5,188	1,929	5,171	963	—	—	—	—	1,048	743	—	819	1,182	794		25,127 (12)
Atromitos	860	1,385	1,450	1,464	1,716	—	—	—	—	—	—	1,354	1,138	1,252	1,104	1,182	1,244		14,149 (11)
Kifisia	407	941	564	268	1,625	1,973	746	—	—	—	—	—	1,822	663	1,074	1,214			11,297 (11)
Lamia	2,141	1,875	2,058	1,780	2,554	1,662	—	—	—	—	—	2,667	1,639	—	2,659	5,153	1,312	981	26,481 (12)
OFI	4,721	4,682	4,314	5,094	5,100	4,062	3,542	—	—	—	—	4,010	5,100	3,992	3,754	3,784	3,714		55,869 (13)
Olympiacos	—	18,458	21,569	20,514	20,653	31,914	28,301	—	—	—	—	—	22,599	31,500	17,526	29,014	14,627	30,020	286,695 (12)
Panathinaikos	9,761	8,671	13,521	11,530	11,635	10,944	—	—	—	—	10,087	9,669	8,323	13,209	12,101	7,546	8,609	8,501	144,107 (14)
Panetolikos	1,683	1,516	1,286	1,475	1,640	1,903	—	—	—	—	—	1,512	2,079	1,576	2,191	2,823			19,684 (11)
Panserraikos	406	1,165	1,610	1,283	—	—	—	—	—	—	970	984	1,084	1,004	993	671	1,155		11,325 (11)
PAOK	10,037	8,876	17,731	8,879	13,106	11,785	5,800	7,926	—	—	—	—	25,346	—	12,190	22,102	17,362	22,281	183,421 (13)
PAS Giannina	2,562	2,927	2,360	2,916	2,113	3,269	—	—	—	—	—	3,586	3,033	2,986	1,393	940			28,085 (11)
Volos	552	3,471	187	425	190	137	5,177	—	—	—	—	474	403	—	—	—			11,016 (9)
League total																			1,290,793

Source: Super League Greece
