= 2026–27 PAOK FC season =

PAOK
2026–27 season
- President: Ivan Savvidis
- Manager: Alessio Lisci
- Stadium: Toumba Stadium
- Super League 1: 4th
- Greek Cup: League Phase
- UEFA Europa League: Third qualifying round
- UEFA Conference League: Play-off round
- Top goalscorer: League: Cherif Ndiaye; Dimitrios Pelkas (3 each); All: Cherif Ndiaye (4 goals)
Home colours	Away colours	Third colours
- All statistics correct as of 12 October 2026.

The 2026–27 PAOK FC season is the club's 101st season in existence and the club's 68th consecutive season in the top flight of Greek football. In addition to the domestic league, PAOK are participating in this season's editions of the Greek Cup and in the Europa League. The season covers the period from 23 July 2026 to 30 June 2027.

== Coaching staff ==
Position	Staff
Head Coach	(Italy) Alessio Lisci
Assistant Coach	(Spain) Moises Hurtado

Last updated: 22 June 2026

== Players ==
=== Squad ===
As of 15 September 2026

Note: Flags indicate national team as defined under FIFA eligibility rules; some limited exceptions apply. Players may hold more than one non-FIFA nationality.

No.	Pos.	Nation	Player
1	GK	CZE	Jiří Pavlenka
2	MF	GUI	Mady Camara
3	DF	ENG	Jonjoe Kenny
4	DF	GRE	Pantelis Chatzidiakos
5	DF	GRE	Giannis Michailidis
6	DF	ESP	Aritz Elustondo
7	MF	FRA	Baptiste Santamaria
8	MF	FRA	Soualiho Meïté
9	FW	RUS	Fyodor Chalov
10	MF	GRE	Dimitrios Pelkas
11	FW	BRA	Taison (vice captain)
13	DF	GRE	Dimitris Giannoulis
14	MF	SRB	Andrija Živković (captain)
16	MF	SRB	Ognjen Ugrešić
18	MF	CRO	Kristijan Jakić (on loan from Augsburg)

No.	Pos.	Nation	Player
19	DF	BRA	Diego Costa (on loan from Krasnodar)
20	MF	GRE	Christos Zafeiris
21	DF	GHA	Baba Rahman
22	MF	SWE	Taha Ali
23	MF	FRA	Tom Louchet
24	FW	COD	Simon Banza (on loan from Al Jazira)
27	FW	SEN	Cherif Ndiaye (on loan from Samsunspor)
32	DF	SCO	Greg Taylor
41	GK	GRE	Dimitrios Monastirlis
47	MF	ENG	Shola Shoretire
52	FW	GRE	Dimitris Chatsidis
56	FW	GRE	Anestis Mythou
77	MF	BUL	Kiril Despodov
99	GK	GRE	Antonis Tsiftsis

== Transfers ==
=== In ===
No.	Pos	Player	Transferred from	Fee	Date	Source
	DF	(Greece) Lefteris Lyratzis	(Greece) Panserraikos	Loan return	1 July 2026	
18	DF	(Mexico) Jonathan Gómez	(Spain) Albacete	Loan return	1 July 2026	
88	GK	(Georgia (country)) Luka Gugeshashvili	(Greece) Atromitos	Loan return	1 July 2026	
9	FW	(Russia) Fyodor Chalov	(Turkey) Kayserispor	Loan return	1 July 2026	
47	FW	(England) Shola Shoretire	(Netherlands) PEC Zwolle	Loan return	1 July 2026	
4	DF	(Greece) Pantelis Chatzidiakos	(Denmark) Copenhagen	€1.5M	17 July 2026	
23	MF	(France) Tom Louchet	(France) Nice	€2M	3 August 2026	
13	DF	(Greece) Dimitris Giannoulis	(Germany) Augsburg	€4.3M	6 August 2026	
27	FW	(Senegal) Cherif Ndiaye	(Turkey) Samsunspor	Loan	17 August 2026	
19	DF	(Brazil) Diego Costa	(Russia) Krasnodar	Loan	6 September 2026	
24	FW	(Democratic Republic of the Congo) Simon Banza	(United Arab Emirates) Al Jazira	Loan	14 September 2026	
Total						€ 7,800,000.00

=== Out ===
No.	Pos	Player	Transferred to	Fee	Date	Source
16	DF	(Poland) Tomasz Kędziora	(Ukraine) Dynamo Kyiv	Free transfer	19 June 2026	
6	DF	(Croatia) Dejan Lovren		End of contract	24 June 2026	
23	DF	(Spain) Joan Sastre	(Cyprus) APOEL	Free transfer	26 June 2026	
18	FW	(Croatia) Luka Ivanušec	(Netherlands) Feyenoord	End of loan	30 June 2026	
7	FW	(Greece) Giorgos Giakoumakis	(Mexico) Cruz Azul	End of loan	30 June 2026	
4	DF	(Italy) Alessandro Vogliacco	(Italy) Genoa	End of loan	30 June 2026	
22	MF	(Italy) Alessandro Bianco	(Italy) Fiorentina	End of loan	30 June 2026	
27	MF	(Russia) Magomed Ozdoyev	(Russia) Krasnodar	Free transfer	6 July 2026	
35	DF	(Mexico) Jorge Sánchez	(Mexico) Atlas	€3M	16 July 2026	
88	GK	(Georgia (country)) Luka Gugeshashvili	(Turkey) Göztepe	Loan	29 July 2026	
71	DF	(Greece) Lefteris Lyratzis	(Greece) Atromitos	Free transfer	3 August 2026	
65	MF	(Greece) Giannis Konstantelias	(Germany) Borussia Dortmund	€26M + ?% resale	17 August 2026	
19	FW	(Sweden) Alexander Jeremejeff	(Indonesia) Persija Jakarta	Free transfer	21 August 2026	
18	DF	(United States) Jonathan Gómez	(Germany) VfL Osnabrück	Loan	1 September 2026	
25	DF	(Greece) Konstantinos Thymianis	(Greece) Panetolikos	Free transfer	16 September 2026	
Total						€ 29,000,000.00

== Pre-season and other friendlies ==
Win Draw Loss

Wednesday, 1 July Friendly	PAOK	4–1	Beveren	Zaltbommel
18:00 EEST, UTC+03:00	Mythou 9'; Zafeiris 53', 62'; Pelkas 87'		40'	Stadium: Sportpark De Watertoren

Saturday, 4 July Friendly	PAOK	4–0	Westerlo	Zaltbommel
15:30 EEST, UTC+03:00	Konstantelias 55'; Thymianis 63'; Camara 74', 79'			Stadium: Sportpark De Watertoren

Tuesday, 7 July 2026 Friendly	PAOK	3–2	AEK Larnaca	Zaltbommel
19:00 EEST, UTC+03:00	Chatsidis 31'; Jeremjeff 59'; Taison 73'		16', 62'	Stadium: Sportpark De Watertoren

Saturday, 11 July 2026 Friendly	PAOK	2–3	Twente	Huissen
17:00 EEST, UTC+03:00	10' (o.g.); Jeremejeff 88'		37', 58', 90+4'	Stadium: Sportpark De Rode Veste; Attendance: Behind closed doors

== Competitions ==
=== Overview ===
Competition	First match	Last match	Starting round	Record							
Competition	First match	Last match	Starting round	Pld	W	D	L	GF	GA	GD	Win %
Super League Greece	23 August 2026		Matchday 1	9	6	0	3	18	12	+6	66.67
Greek Football Cup	2 September 2026		Matchday 1	3	2	1	0	4	1	+3	66.67
Europa League	23 July 2026	13 August 2026	Second qualifying round	4	2	0	2	7	6	+1	50.00
Conference League	20 August 2026	27 August 2026	Play-off round	2	0	1	1	3	4	−1	0.00
Total				18	10	2	6	32	23	+9	55.56

Source: Soccerway

=== Managerial statistics ===
Head Coach	From	To	Record							
Head Coach	From	To	G	W	D	L	GF	GA	GD	Win %
(Italy) Alessio Lisci	1 July 2026	Present	18	10	2	6	32	23	+9	55.56

Last updated: 1 November 2026

=== Super League Greece ===
==== League table ====
Pos	Team	Pld	W	D	L	GF	GA	GD	Pts	Qualification or relegation
2	Olympiacos	10	7	2	1	16	5	+11	23	Qualification for the Championship play-offs
3	AEK Athens	9	6	2	1	23	6	+17	20	Qualification for the Championship play-offs
4	PAOK	10	6	1	3	19	13	+6	19	Qualification for the Championship play-offs
5	Aris	10	6	1	3	16	17	−1	19	Qualification for the Europe play-offs
6	OFI	10	5	2	3	14	12	+2	17	Qualification for the Europe play-offs

Updated to match(es) played on 8 November 2026. Source: Super League Greece
Rules for classification: 1) Points; 2) Head-to-head points; 3) Head-to-head goal difference; 4) Overall goal difference; 5) Goals scored; 6) Total wins; 7) Away goals scored; 8) Away wins.

==== Matches ====
Sunday, 23 August 2026 1	PAOK	4–0	Levadiakos	Thessaloniki
21:00 EEST, UTC+03:00	Shoretire 36'; Pelkas 41'; Mythou 72'; Živković 89' (pen.)			Stadium: Toumba; Attendance: 9,014; Referee: Angelos Evangelou (Athens)

Sunday, 30 August 2026 2	Atromitos	1–2	PAOK	Peristeri
20:15 EEST, UTC+03:00	19'		43', 64' Pelkas; (yellow card) 51' Taylor	Stadium: Peristeri Stadium; Attendance: 2,398; Referee: Athanasios Tzilos (Thessaly)

Sunday, 6 September 2026 3	Panathinaikos	3–1	PAOK	Marousi
21:30 EEST, UTC+03:00	29', (penalty missed) 45+2', 38', 53'; (red card) 69'		(red card) 15' Elustondo; (yellow card) 45+1' Bataoulas; 90+2' Ugrešić	Stadium: Athens Olympic Stadium; Attendance: 23,086; Referee: Felix Zwayer (Germany)

Sunday, 13 September 2026 4	PAOK	2–0	Aris	Thessaloniki
20:30 EEST, UTC+03:00	Kenny (yellow card) 3'; Zafeiris (yellow card) 20'; Ndiaye 32' (pen.), (yellow card) 77'; Živković 42'			Stadium: Toumba Stadium; Attendance: 19,545; Referee: Andrea Colombo (Italy)

20 September 2026 5	Panetolikos	1–3	PAOK	Agrinio
21:00 EEST, UTC+03:00	51'		Ali 33'; Ndiaye 39'; Jakić (yellow card) 89'; Baba (yellow card) 90+8'; Shoretire 90+5'	Stadium: Panetolikos Stadium; Attendance: 2,944; Referee: Konstantinos Katoikos (Athens)

Monday, 12 October 2026 6	PAOK	v	Kalamata	Thessaloniki
18:00 EEST, UTC+03:00				Stadium: Toumba Stadium

Sunday, 18 October 2026 7	PAOK	v	Iraklis	Thessaloniki
21:00 EEST, UTC+03:00				Stadium: Toumba Stadium

Sunday, 25 October 2026 8	OFI	v	PAOK	Heraklion
20:00 EET, UTC+02:00				Stadium: Theodoros Vardinogiannis Stadium

Sunday, 1 November 2026 9	PAOK	v	Asteras Tripolis	Thessaloniki
19:00 EET, UTC+02:00				Stadium: Toumba Stadium

Sunday, 8 November 2026 10	Olympiacos	v	PAOK	Piraeus
21:00 EET, UTC+02:00				Stadium: Karaiskakis Stadium

Sunday, 22 November 2026 11	PAOK	v	Kifisia	Thessaloniki
19:30 EET, UTC+02:00				Stadium: Toumba Stadium

Sunday, 29 November 2029 12	AEK Athens	v	PAOK	Nea Filadelfeia
21:00 EET, UTC+02:00				Stadium: Agia Sophia Stadium

Sunday, 6 December 2026 13	PAOK	v	Volos	Thessaloniki
19:30 EET, UTC+02:00				Stadium: Toumba Stadium

==== Results by round ====
Round	1	2	3	4	5	6	7	8	9	10	11	12	13	14	15	16	17	18	19	20	21	22	23	24	25	26
Ground	H	A	A	H	A	H	H	A	H	A	H	A	H	H	A	A	H	A	H	A	H	A	H	A	H	A
Result	W	W	L	W	W	L	W	L	W																	
Position	1	1	6	2	2	4	3	5	3																	

A = Away; H = Home; W = Win; D = Draw; L = Loss

==== Results summary ====
Overall								Home						Away					
Pld	W	D	L	GF	GA	GD	Pts	W	D	L	GF	GA	GD	W	D	L	GF	GA	GD
9	6	0	3	18	12	+6	18	4	0	1	11	5	+6	2	0	2	7	7	0

=== Greek Cup ===
==== League phase ====
Pos	Team	Pld	W	D	L	GF	GA	GD	Pts	Qualification
1	Olympiacos	3	3	0	0	9	2	+7	9	Advance to Quarter-finals
2	Panathinaikos	3	3	0	0	5	1	+4	9	Advance to Quarter-finals
3	PAOK	3	2	1	0	4	1	+3	7	Advance to Quarter-finals
4	AEK Athens	3	2	0	1	11	4	+7	6	Advance to Quarter-finals
5	Atromitos	3	2	0	1	4	2	+2	6	Advance to Play-offs (seeded)

Updated to match(es) played on 28 October 2026. Source: League Phase Results and Standings

Round	1	2	3	4	5
Ground	H	-	A	H	A
Result	D	-	W	W	
Position	10	11	7	3	

A = Away; H = Home; W = Win; D = Draw; L = Loss

Win Draw Loss Fixtures

Wednesday, 2 September 2026 1	PAOK	0–0	OFI	Thessaloniki
22:15 EEST, UTC+03:00	Taylor (red card) 86'	Report		Stadium: Toumba; Referee: Fotis Polychronis (Pieria)

Wednesday, 16 September 2026 3	Atromitos	0–1	PAOK	Peristeri
20:00 EEST, UTC+03:00		Report	20' Mythou; (yellow card) 90+2' Tsiftsis	Stadium: Peristeri Stadium; Referee: Konstantinos Tsetsilas (Grevena)

Wednesday, 28 October 2026 4	PAOK	v	AEK	Thessaloniki
20:30 EET, UTC+02:00				Stadium: Toumba

5	Kalamata	v	PAOK	Kalamata
EET, UTC+02:00				Stadium: Kalamata Municipal Stadium

=== UEFA Europa League ===
==== Second qualifying round ====
23 July 2026 First leg	Dynamo Kyiv (Ukraine)	2–3	(Greece) PAOK	Lublin, Poland
20:00 EEST	3', 77'	Report	Konstantelias 13', (yellow card) 63'; Zafeiris 38'; Santamaria 51'; Chatzidiakos (yellow card) 57'; Jeremejeff (yellow card) 88'	Stadium: Arena Lublin, Attendance: 3,225; Referee: Sandi Putros (Denmark)

30 July 2026 Second leg	PAOK (Greece)	2–0 (5–2 agg.)	(Ukraine) Dynamo Kyiv	Thessaloniki
20:45 EEST	Chatzidiakos (yellow card) 35'; Konstantelias 45+1', 48'			Stadium: Toumba Stadium; Attendance: 18,760; Referee: Damian Sylwestrzak (Poland)

==== Third qualifying round ====
Thursday, 6 August 2026 First leg	PAOK (Greece)	0–1	(Belgium) Anderlecht	Thessaloniki
20:45 EEST	Michailidis (penalty missed) 36'; Chatzidiakos (yellow card) 38'; Elustondo (yellow card) 86'	Report	1'	Stadium: Toumba Stadium; Attendance: 19,161; Referee: Juan Martínez Munuera (Spain)

Thursday, 13 August 2026 Second leg	Anderlecht (Belgium)	3–2 (4–2 agg.)	(Greece) PAOK	Anderlecht
21:30 EEST	20', 47', 55'	Report	Živković 34', (red card) 89'; Baba (yellow card) 43'; Zafeiris (yellow card) 82'; Jeremejeff 88' (pen.), (red card) 90+4'	Stadium: Constant Vanden Stock Stadium; Attendance: 17,976; Referee: Simone Sozza (Italy)

=== UEFA Conference League ===
==== Play-offs round ====
Thursday, 20 August 2026 First leg	PAOK (Greece)	1–1	(Norway) Brann	Thessaloniki
19:45 EEST	Zafeiris (yellow card) 63'; Baba 80'; Chatzidiakos (yellow card) 90+3'	Report	57'	Stadium: Toumba Stadium; Attendance: 14,667; Referee: Daniel Siebert (Germany)

Thursday, 27 August 2026 Second leg	Brann (Norway)	3–2 (4–3 agg.)	PAOK (Greece)	Bergen
19:00 EEST	45+3', 56', 86' (pen.)	Report	(yellow card) 37' Louchet; (yellow card) 53' Michailidis; (yellow card) 57', (goal) 67' Zafeiris; 63' Ndiaye; (yellow card) 84' Giannoulis; (yellow card) 90+4' Pelkas	Stadium: Brann Stadion; Attendance: 15,483; Referee: John Brooks (England)

== Statistics ==
=== Squad statistics ===
The squad was informed and the official page of PAOK FC.

As of 1 November 2026

Appearances denote players in the starting lineup, with the numbers in parentheses denoting appearances as substitute.

No.	Name	Super League		Greek Cup		Europa League		Conference League		Total	
No.	Name	Apps	Goals	Apps	Goals	Apps	Goals	Apps	Goals	Apps	Goals
Goalkeepers
1	(Czech Republic) Jiří Pavlenka	5	0	0	0	4	0	2	0	11	0
41	(Greece) Dimitrios Monastirlis	2 (1)	0	1	0	0	0	0	0	3 (1)	0
99	(Greece) Antonis Tsiftsis	2 (1)	0	2	0	0	0	0	0	4 (1)	0
Defenders
3	(England) Jonjoe Kenny	9	0	3	0	4	0	2	0	18	0
4	(Greece) Pantelis Chatzidiakos	2 (1)	0	1	0	3	0	2	0	8 (1)	0
5	(Greece) Giannis Michailidis	7 (1)	1	1	0	4	0	1	0	13 (1)	1
6	(Spain) Aritz Elustondo	4 (3)	0	1	0	1 (3)	0	1	0	7 (6)	0
13	(Greece) Dimitris Giannoulis	3	0	1	0	0 (1)	0	2	0	6 (1)	0
19	(Brazil) Diego Costa	5	0	2	0	0	0	0	0	7	0
21	(Ghana) Baba Rahman	6 (1)	0	1	0	1 (2)	0	0 (2)	1	8 (5)	1
32	(Scotland) Greg Taylor	2 (2)	0	2 (1)	0	0 (2)	0	0 (2)	0	4 (7)	0
97	(Greece) Dimitrios Bataoulas	0 (2)	0	1 (1)	0	0	0	0	0	1 (3)	0
Midfielders
2	(Guinea) Mady Camara	0 (4)	0	1 (2)	0	0 (3)	0	1	0	2 (9)	0
7	(France) Baptiste Santamaria	2 (4)	0	2 (1)	0	4	1	2	0	10 (5)	1
10	(Greece) Dimitrios Pelkas	6	3	0 (1)	0	0 (2)	0	0 (1)	0	6 (4)	3
16	(Serbia) Ognjen Ugrešić	3 (3)	1	2	0	0	0	0	0	5 (3)	1
18	(Croatia) Kristijan Jakić	4 (2)	0	2	0	0	0	0	0	6 (2)	0
20	(Greece) Christos Zafeiris	8	0	0 (2)	0	4	1	2	1	14 (2)	2
22	(Sweden) Taha Ali	3 (1)	1	1 (1)	0	1	0	0	0	5 (2)	1
23	(France) Tom Louchet	1 (1)	0	0	0	0 (1)	0	1 (1)	0	2 (3)	0
Forwards
11	(Brazil) Taison	4 (2)	0	1	0	3 (1)	0	1 (1)	0	9 (4)	0
14	(Serbia) Andrija Živković	8 (1)	2	2	0	4	1	0	0	14 (1)	3
24	(Democratic Republic of the Congo) Simon Banza	1 (3)	2	1	1	0	0	0	0	2 (3)	3
27	(Senegal) Cherif Ndiaye	9	4	1 (2)	1	0	0	1 (1)	1	11 (3)	6
47	(England) Shola Shoretire	2 (2)	2	0 (2)	1	0	0	1 (1)	0	3 (5)	3
52	(Greece) Dimitris Chatsidis	1 (4)	0	2 (1)	0	0 (2)	0	2	0	5 (7)	0
56	(Greece) Anestis Mythou	0 (4)	2	2 (1)	1	4	0	1 (1)	0	7 (6)	3
77	(Bulgaria) Kiril Despodov	0	0	0	0	0	0	0	0	0	0
Players transferred out during the season
65	(Greece) Giannis Konstantelias	0	0	0	0	4	3	0	0	4	3
19	(Sweden) Alexander Jeremejeff	0	0	0	0	0 (3)	1	0	0	0 (3)	1
18	(United States) Jonathan Gómez	0	0	0	0	3	0	0	0	3	0
25	(Greece) Konstantinos Thymianis	0 (2)	0	0	0	0	0	0	0	0 (2)	0

=== Goalscorers ===
As of 1 November 2026

Rank	No.	Pos.	Player	Super League	Greek Cup	Europa League	Conference League	Total
1	27	FW	(Senegal) Ndiaye	4	1	0	1	6
2	65	MF	(Greece) Konstantelias	0	0	3	0	3
	10	MF	(Greece) Pelkas	3	0	0	0	3
	14	FW	(Serbia) Živković	2	0	1	0	3
	24	FW	(Democratic Republic of the Congo) Banza	2	1	0	0	3
	47	MF	(England) Shoretire	2	1	0	0	3
	56	FW	(Greece) Mythou	2	1	0	0	3
8	20	MF	(Greece) Zafeiris	0	0	1	1	2
9	7	MF	(France) Santamaria	0	0	1	0	1
	19	FW	(Sweden) Jeremejeff	0	0	1	0	1
	21	DF	(Ghana) Baba	0	0	0	1	1
	16	FW	(Serbia) Ugrešić	1	0	0	0	1
	22	MF	(Sweden) Ali	1	0	0	0	1
	5	DF	(Greece) Michailidis	1	0	0	0	1
Own goals				0	0	0	0	0
TOTAL				18	4	7	3	32

=== Clean sheets ===
As of 1 November 2026

Player	League	Cup	EL	CoL	Total	Games played	Percentage
(Czech Republic) Jiří Pavlenka	2		1	0	3	11	27,27%
(Greece) Antonis Tsiftsis	1	2			3	5	60,00%
(Greece) Dimitrios Monastirlis	0	0				4	0,00%
Total	3	2	1	0	6	20	30,00%

=== Disciplinary record ===
As of 1 November 2026

S	P	N	Name	Super League			Greek Cup			Europa League			Conference League			Total		
S	P	N	Name	Yellow card	Yellow-red card	Red card	Yellow card	Yellow-red card	Red card	Yellow card	Yellow-red card	Red card	Yellow card	Yellow-red card	Red card	Yellow card	Yellow-red card	Red card
4	DF	(Greece)	Chatzidiakos	0	0	0	0	0	0	3	0	0	1	0	0	4	0	0
6	FW	(Spain)	Elustondo	1	0	1	0	0	0	1	0	0	0	0	0	2	0	1
21	DF	(Ghana)	Baba	1	0	0	0	0	0	1	0	0	0	0	0	2	0	0
20	MF	(Greece)	Zafeiris	1	0	0	0	0	0	1	0	0	2	0	0	4	0	0
14	FW	(Serbia)	Živković	1	0	0	0	0	0	0	0	1	0	0	0	1	0	1
23	MF	(France)	Louchet	1	0	0	0	0	0	0	0	0	1	0	0	2	0	0
5	DF	(Greece)	Michailidis	0	0	0	0	0	0	0	0	0	1	0	0	1	0	0
13	DF	(Greece)	Giannoulis	1	0	0	1	0	0	0	0	0	1	0	0	3	0	0
10	MF	(Greece)	Pelkas	0	0	0	0	0	0	0	0	0	1	0	0	1	0	0
32	DF	(Scotland)	Taylor	1	0	0	1	0	1	0	0	0	0	0	0	2	0	1
97	DF	(Greece)	Bataoulas	1	0	0	0	0	0	0	0	0	0	0	0	1	0	0
3	DF	(England)	Kenny	1	1	0	0	0	0	0	0	0	0	0	0	1	1	0
27	FW	(Senegal)	Ndiaye	1	0	0	0	0	0	0	0	0	0	0	0	1	0	0
99	GK	(Greece)	Tsiftsis	0	0	1	1	0	0	0	0	0	0	0	0	1	0	1
18	MF	(Croatia)	Jakić	2	0	0	0	0	0	0	0	0	0	0	0	2	0	0
19	DF	(Brazil)	Costa	1	0	0	0	0	0	0	0	0	0	0	0	1	0	0
47	FW	(England)	Shoretire	1	0	0	0	0	0	0	0	0	0	0	0	1	0	0
Players transferred out during the season
65	MF	(Greece)	Konstantelias	0	0	0	0	0	0	1	0	0	0	0	0	1	0	0
19	FW	(Sweden)	Jeremejeff	0	0	0	0	0	0	1	0	1	0	0	0	1	0	1
