= 2025–26 PAOK FC season =

PAOK
2025–26 season
- President: Ivan Savvidis
- Manager: Răzvan Lucescu
- Stadium: Toumba Stadium
- Super League Greece: 3rd
- Greek Cup: Runners-up
- UEFA Europa League: Knockout phase play-offs
- Top goalscorer: League: Magomed Ozdoyev; Giannis Konstantelias (8 goals each); All: Giorgos Giakoumakis (15 goals)
- Highest home attendance: 25,022 vs AEK Athens (15 February 2026)
- Lowest home attendance: 13,062 vs Panetolikos (20 September 2025)
- Average home league attendance: 18,193
- Biggest win: 0–5 vs Panserraikos (2 November 2025)
- Biggest defeat: 3–0 vs AEK Athens (19 April 2026)
Home colours	Away colours	Third colours
- All statistics correct as of 17 May 2026.

The 2025–26 PAOK FC season is the club's 100th season in existence and the club's 67th consecutive season in the top flight of Greek football. In addition to the domestic league, PAOK are participating in this season's editions of the Greek Cup and in the Europa League. The season covers the period from 7 August 2025 to 30 June 2026.

== Coaching staff ==
(Romania) Răzvan Lucescu	Head coach
(Italy) Gianpaolo Castorina	Assistant coaches
(Greece) Pantelis Konstantinidis	Assistant coaches
(Romania) Nicolae Constantin	Assistant coaches
(Greece) Vangelis Lappas	Goalkeeping coach

Source: PAOK Staff

== Players ==
=== Squad ===
As of 5 February 2026

Note: Flags indicate national team as defined under FIFA eligibility rules; some limited exceptions apply. Players may hold more than one non-FIFA nationality.

No.	Pos.	Nation	Player
1	GK	CZE	Jiří Pavlenka
2	MF	GUI	Mady Camara
3	DF	ENG	Jonjoe Kenny
4	DF	ITA	Alessandro Vogliacco (on loan from Genoa)
5	DF	GRE	Giannis Michailidis
6	DF	CRO	Dejan Lovren
7	FW	GRE	Giorgos Giakoumakis (on loan from Cruz Azul)
8	MF	FRA	Soualiho Meïté
10	MF	GRE	Dimitrios Pelkas
11	MF	BRA	Taison (vice captain)
14	MF	SRB	Andrija Živković (captain)
16	DF	POL	Tomasz Kędziora
18	MF	CRO	Luka Ivanušec (on loan from Feyenoord)

No.	Pos.	Nation	Player
19	FW	SWE	Alexander Jeremejeff
20	MF	GRE	Christos Zafeiris
21	DF	GHA	Baba Rahman
22	MF	ITA	Alessandro Bianco (on loan from Fiorentina)
23	DF	ESP	Joan Sastre
25	DF	GRE	Konstantinos Thymianis
27	MF	RUS	Magomed Ozdoyev
32	DF	SCO	Greg Taylor
35	DF	MEX	Jorge Sánchez
52	FW	GRE	Dimitris Chatsidis
56	FW	GRE	Anestis Mythou
65	MF	GRE	Giannis Konstantelias
77	MF	BUL	Kiril Despodov
99	GK	GRE	Antonis Tsiftsis

== Transfers ==
=== In ===
No.	Pos	Player	Transferred from	Fee	Date	Source
3	DF	(England) Jonjoe Kenny	(Germany) Hertha BSC	Free Transfer	20 June 2025	
	MF	(Austria) Thomas Murg	(Saudi Arabia) Al-Khaleej	Loan return	1 July 2025	
	MF	(Greece) Lefteris Lyratzis	(Netherlands) NEC	Loan return	1 July 2025	
	MF	(Portugal) Filipe Soares	(Portugal) Farense	Loan return	1 July 2025	
	MF	(Portugal) André Ricardo	(Portugal) Chaves	Loan return	1 July 2025	
88	GK	(Georgia (country)) Luka Gugeshashvili	(Greece) Panserraikos	1M	1 July 2025	
32	DF	(Scotland) Greg Taylor	(Scotland) Celtic	Free Transfer	1 July 2025	
18	FW	(Croatia) Luka Ivanušec	(Netherlands) Feyenoord	Loan	13 July 2025	
7	FW	(Greece) Giorgos Giakoumakis	(Mexico) Cruz Azul	Loan	13 August 2025	
20	MF	(Greece) Christos Zafeiris	(Czech Republic) Slavia	10,5M	26 August 2025	
4	DF	(Italy) Alessandro Vogliacco	(Italy) Genoa	Loan	31 August 2025	
22	MF	(Italy) Alessandro Bianco	(Italy) Fiorentina	Loan	1 September 2025	
19	FW	(Sweden) Alexander Jeremejeff	(Greece) Panathinaikos	Free Transfer	31 December 2025	
35	DF	(Mexico) Jorge Sánchez	(Mexico) Cruz Azul	2,5M	5 February 2026	
Total						€ 14,000,000.00

=== Out ===
No.	Pos	Player	Transferred to	Fee	Date	Source
22	MF	(Austria) Stefan Schwab	(Germany) Holstein Kiel	Free transfer	16 June 2025	
20	DF	(Portugal) Vieirinha		Retired	30 June 2025	
28	DF	(Poland) Mateusz Wieteska	(Italy) Cagliari	End of loan	30 June 2025	
	FW	(Morocco) Tarik Tissoudali	(United Arab Emirates) Khor Fakkan	1,7M	2 July 2025	
19	DF	(Spain) Jonny Otto	(Spain) Alavés	Free transfer	2 July 2025	
42	GK	(Croatia) Dominik Kotarski	(Denmark) Copenhagen	€5M + 15% resale	9 July 2025	
4	MF	(Peru) Sergio Peña	(Peru) Alianza Lima	€315,000	9 July 2025	
18	DF	(Mexico) Jonathan Gómez	(Spain) Albacete	Loan	10 July 2025	
	DF	(Greece) Lefteris Lyratzis	(Greece) Panserraikos	Loan	17 July 2025	
45	DF	(Greece) Marios Tsaousis	(Greece) Panserraikos	Free transfer	19 July 2025	
	MF	(Portugal) Filipe Soares	(Portugal) Nacional	Free transfer	22 July 2025	
	MF	(Uruguay) Nicolás Quagliata	(Peru) Melgar	Free transfer	22 July 2025	
15	DF	(The Gambia) Omar Colley	(Saudi Arabia) Al-Diriyah	Free transfer	23 July 2025	
70	FW	(Tanzania) Mbwana Samatta	(France) Le Havre	Free transfer	5 August 2025	
71	FW	(Spain) Brandon Thomas	(Cyprus) Apollon Limassol	Free transfer	6 August 2025	
47	FW	(England) Shola Shoretire	(Netherlands) PEC Zwolle	Loan	3 September 2025	
9	FW	(Russia) Fyodor Chalov	(Turkey) Kayserispor	Loan	4 February 2026	
88	GK	(Georgia (country)) Luka Gugeshashvili	(Greece) Atromitos	Loan	6 February 2026	
Total						€ 7,015,000.00

== Pre-season and other friendlies ==
Win Draw Loss

Friday, 11 July 2025 Friendly	PAOK	2–0	Panserraikos	Nea Mesimvria
18:30 EEST, UTC+03:00	Chatsidis 1'; Despodov 89'			Stadium: PAOK Sport Center; Attendance: Behind closed doors

Wednesday, 16 July 2025 Friendly	Ajax	2–1	PAOK	Amsterdam
15:00 EEST, UTC+03:00	29'; Bataoulas 71' (o.g.)		(yellow card) 35' Shoretire; 74' Mythou; (yellow card) 83' Ozdoyev	Stadium: Sportpark De Toekomst; Attendance: Behind closed doors Referee: Joey Kooij

Saturday, 19 July 2025 Friendly	Go Ahead Eagles	3–3	PAOK	Zaltbommel
18:00 EEST, UTC+03:00	Edvardsen 6'; Kramer 47'; Tengstedt 112'		Konstantelias 14'; Lovren 34'; Chatsidis 36'	Stadium: Sportpark De Watertoren
Note: Two-hour game consisting of four 30 minute quarters

Wednesday, 23 July 2025 Friendly	PAOK	3–1	Apollon Limassol	Zaltbommel
18:00 EEST, UTC+03:00	Despodov 74'; Chalov 88'; Baba 90+1'		113'	Stadium: Sportpark De Watertoren
Note: Two-hour game consisting of four 30 minute quarters

Saturday, 26 July 2025 Friendly	NEC	2–3	PAOK	Zaltbommel
15:00 EEST, UTC+03:00	20' (pen.), 63'		Živković 9'; Konstantelias 48'; Taison 84'	Stadium: Sportpark De Watertoren; Attendance: Behind closed doors
Note: Two-hour game consisting of four 30 minute quarters

== Competitions ==
=== Overview ===
Competition	First match	Last match	Starting round	Record							
Competition	First match	Last match	Starting round	Pld	W	D	L	GF	GA	GD	Win %
Super League Greece	24 August 2025	17 May 2026	Matchday 1	32	18	10	4	59	25	+34	56.25
Greek Football Cup	17 September 2025	25 April 2026	Matchday 1	9	5	2	2	18	11	+7	55.56
Europa League	7 August 2025	26 February 2026	Third qualifying round	14	5	4	5	24	18	+6	35.71
Total				55	28	16	11	101	54	+47	50.91

Source: Soccerway

=== Managerial statistics ===
Head coach	From	To	Record							
Head coach	From	To	G	W	D	L	GF	GA	GD	Win %
(Romania) Răzvan Lucescu	1 July 2025	Present	55	28	16	11	101	54	+47	50.91

Last updated: 17 May 2026

=== Super League Greece ===
==== League table ====
Pos	Team	Pld	W	D	L	GF	GA	GD	Pts	Qualification or relegation
1	AEK Athens	26	18	6	2	49	17	+32	60	Qualification for the Championship play-offs
2	Olympiacos	26	17	7	2	45	11	+34	58	Qualification for the Championship play-offs
3	PAOK	26	17	6	3	52	17	+35	57	Qualification for the Championship play-offs
4	Panathinaikos	26	14	7	5	44	26	+18	49	Qualification for the Championship play-offs
5	Levadiakos	26	12	6	8	51	37	+14	42	Qualification for the Europe play-offs

Source: Super League Greece
Rules for classification: 1) Points; 2) Head-to-head points; 3) Head-to-head goal difference; 4) Overall goal difference; 5) Goals scored; 6) Total wins; 7) Away goals scored; 8) Away wins.

==== Matches ====
Sunday, 24 August 2025 1	PAOK	1–0	AEL	Thessaloniki
21:00 EEST, UTC+03:00	Despodov 47'; Giakoumakis (yellow card) 90+5'			Stadium: Toumba Stadium; Attendance: Behind closed doors Referee: Vasilis Fotias (Pella)

Sunday, 31 August 2025 2	PAOK	1–0	Atromitos	Thessaloniki
21:00 EEST, UTC+03:00	Pelkas 73', (yellow card) 90+4'		(yellow card) 37' (yellow-red card) 45+4'	Stadium: Toumba Stadium; Attendance: 16,687; Referee: Alexandros Katsikogiannis (Epirus)

Sunday, 14 September 2025 3	OFI	1–2	PAOK	Ampelokipoi
21:30 EEST, UTC+03:00	75'		10' Ozdoyev; 24' Pelkas; (yellow card) 42' Baba; (penalty missed) 66' Živković	Stadium: Leoforos Alexandras Stadium; Attendance: Behind closed doors Referee: Angelos Evangelou (Athens)

Saturday, 20 September 2025 4	PAOK	0–0	Panetolikos	Thessaloniki
20:30 EEST, UTC+03:00	Živković (yellow card) 5'		(red card) 82'	Stadium: Toumba Stadium; Attendance: 13,062; Referee: Anastasios Sidiropoulos (Dodecanese)

Sunday, 28 September 2025 5	Asteras Tripolis	3–3	PAOK	Tripoli
20:30 EEST, UTC+03:00	7', 45+2', 74', (yellow card) 56' (yellow-red card) 90'		Despodov 21' (pen.); Konstantelias 26'; Kenny (yellow card) 28'; Chalov 34' (pen.); Camara (yellow card) 40'; Ozdoyev (yellow card) 90+3'; Živković (yellow card) 67'	Stadium: Theodoros Kolokotronis Stadium; Attendance: 1,738; Referee: Stavros Tsimenteridis (Kozani)

Sunday, 5 October 2025 6	PAOK	2–1	Olympiacos	Thessaloniki
20:30 EEST	Kędziora (yellow card) 42'; Taison 63'; Živković 75' (pen.) (yellow card) 90+3'; Konstantelias (yellow card) 85'; Ivanušec (yellow card) 90'	Report	22'	Stadium: Toumba Stadium; Attendance: 23,961; Referee: Harm Osmers (Germany)

Sunday, 19 October 2025 7	AEK Athens	0–2	PAOK	Nea Filadelfeia
21:00 EEST, UTC+03:00	(red card) 86'	Report	Baba 45'; Konstantelias 48'; Tsiftsis (yellow card) 90+1'	Stadium: Agia Sophia Stadium; Attendance: 29,210; Referee: Sascha Stegemann (Germany)

Sunday, 26 October 2025 8	PAOK	3–0	Volos	Thessaloniki
19:30 EET, UTC+02:00	Giakoumakis 49'; Meïté (yellow card) 59'; Kenny (yellow card) 70'; Ozdoyev 73', 80'			Stadium: Toumba Stadium; Attendance: 17,385; Referee: Christos Vergetis (Arcadia)

Sunday, 2 November 2025 9	Panserraikos	0–5	PAOK	Serres
19:30 EET, UTC+02:00			3' Own-goal; 16', 73' Ozdoyev; 81' Giakoumakis; 89' Bianco	Stadium: Serres Municipal Stadium; Attendance: 5,020; Referee: Athanasios Tzilos (Thessaly)

Sunday, 9 November 2025 10	Panathinaikos	2–1	PAOK	Ampelokipoi
21:00 EET, UTC+02:00	20', 31'	Report	(yellow card) 46' Giakoumakis; 61' Konstantelias; (yellow card) 72' Taison; (yellow card) 61' Bianco	Stadium: Leoforos Alexandras Stadium; Attendance: 11,114; Referee: Daniel Schlager (Germany)

Sunday, 23 November 2025 11	PAOK	3–0	A.E. Kifisia	Thessaloniki
19:00 EET, UTC+02:00	Own-goal 43'; 88', 90+3' Taison; (yellow card) 90' Ozdoyev		(yellow card) 46' (yellow-red card) 73'	Stadium: Toumba Stadium; Attendance: 15,057; Referee: Georgios Kokkinos (Chalkidiki)

Sunday, 30 November 2025 12	Levadiakos	2–3	PAOK	Livadeia
19:00 EET, UTC+02:00	10', 50'		(yellow card) 30' Kędziora; 45', 55' Ozdoyev; (red card) 77' Meïté; (yellow card) 77' Lovren; 90' Giakoumakis	Stadium: Levadia Municipal Stadium; Attendance: 2,198; Referee: Anastasios Sidiropoulos (Dodecanese)

Sunday, 7 December 2025 13	PAOK	3–1	Aris	Thessaloniki
19:30 EET, UTC+02:00	Ivanušec (yellow card) 1'; Taison 28'; Giakoumakis 45+6' (pen.) 48'; Ozdoyev (yellow card) 68'		45'	Stadium: Toumba Stadium; Attendance: 24,636; Referee: Srđan Jovanović (Serbia)

Sunday, 14 December 2025 14	Atromitos	2–0	PAOK	Peristeri
18:00 EET, UTC+02:00	17', 90+5' (pen.)		(yellow card) 37' Despodov	Stadium: Peristeri Stadium; Attendance: 2,144; Referee: Alexandros Tsakalidis (Chalkidiki)

Sunday, 21 December 2025 15	PAOK	2–0	Panathinaikos	Thessaloniki
19:30 EET, UTC+02:00	Konstantelias 39'; Mythou 53'; Kenny (yellow card) 57'			Stadium: Toumba Stadium; Attendance: 22,938; Referee: Irfan Peljto (Bosnia and Herzegovina)

Saturday, 10 January 2026 16	Panetolikos	0–3	PAOK	Agrinio
19:30 EET, UTC+02:00			26', 57' Konstantelias; 45+1' Giakoumakis; (yellow card) 81' Živković	Stadium: Panetolikos Stadium; Attendance: 1,843; Referee: Vasilis Fotias (Pella)

Sunday, 18 January 2026 17	PAOK	3–0	OFI	Thessaloniki
19:00 EET, UTC+02:00	Pelkas 18'; Taison 40'; Giakoumakis 43'; Zafeiris (yellow card) 75'			Stadium: Toumba Stadium; Attendance: 12,816; Referee: Meletis Gioumatzidis (Pella)

Wednesday, 4 March 2026 18	A.E. Kifisia	1–4	PAOK	Nikaia
20:00 EET, UTC+02:00	60'		32' (pen.), 72' (pen.) Jeremejeff; (yellow card) 34' Bianco; (yellow card) 62' Ivanušec; 88' Baba; 90+2' Konstantelias	Stadium: Neapoli Stadium; Attendance: 1,177; Referee: Vasilis Fotias (Pella)
Note: Fixture was initially scheduled for 25 January 2026.

Sunday, 1 February 2026 19	PAOK	4–1	Panserraikos	Thessaloniki
19:30 EET, UTC+02:00	Jeremejeff 5'; Despodov 8'; Pelkas 19'; Vogliacco 26'		12'	Stadium: Toumba Stadium; Attendance: 14,416; Referee: Michalis Matsoukas (Aetoloacarnania)

Sunday, 8 February 2026 20	Aris	0–0	PAOK	Thessaloniki
19:00 EET, UTC+02:00			Zafeiris (yellow card) 10'; Vogliacco (yellow card) 45'; Taison (yellow card) 90+6'	Stadium: Kleanthis Vikelidis Stadium; Attendance: 8,946; Referee: Sascha Stegemann (Germany)

Sunday, 15 February 2026 21	PAOK	0–0	AEK Athens	Thessaloniki
19:30 EET, UTC+02:00	Giakoumakis (penalty missed) 12'; A. Živković (yellow card) 33'; Tsiftsis (yellow card) 34'; Camara (yellow card) 55'; Kędziora (yellow card) 84'			Stadium: Toumba Stadium; Attendance: 25,022; Referee: Harm Osmers (Germany)
Note: Tsiftsis received his yellow card while being a sub on the bench.

Sunday, 22 February 2026 22	AEL	1–1	PAOK	Larissa
18:00 EET, UTC+02:00	62'		14' Chatsidis	Stadium: AEL FC Arena; Attendance: 5,766; Referee: Stavros Tsimenteridis (Kozani)

Sunday, 1 March 2026 23	PAOK	2–0	Asteras Tripolis	Thessaloniki
19:00 EET, UTC+02:00	Chatsidis 7'; Živković 89'			Stadium: Toumba Stadium; Attendance: 13,915; Referee: Anastasios Papapetrou (Athens)

Sunday, 8 March 2026 24	Olympiacos	0–0	PAOK	Piraeus
21:00 EET, UTC+02:00			(yellow card) 89' Michailidis	Stadium: Karaiskakis Stadium; Attendance: 32,855; Referee: José María Sánchez Martínez (Spain)

Sunday, 15 March 2026 25	PAOK	3–0	Levadiakos	Thessaloniki
18:00 EET, UTC+02:00	Taison 7'; Kędziora (yellow card) 45+2'; Chatsidis 47'; Lovren (yellow card) 52'; Jeremejeff 57'			Stadium: Toumba Stadium; Attendance: 17,420; Referee: Christos Vergetis (Arcadia)

Sunday, 22 March 2026 26	Volos	2–1	PAOK	Volos
19:00 EET, UTC+02:00	64', 90+5'		13' Jeremejeff	Stadium: Panthessaliko Stadium; Attendance: 5,835; Referee: Fotios Polychronis (Pieria)

==== Results by round ====
Round	1	2	3	4	5	6	7	8	9	10	11	12	13	14	15	16	17	18	19	20	21	22	23	24	25	26
Ground	H	H	A	H	A	H	A	H	A	A	H	A	H	A	H	A	H	A	H	A	H	A	H	A	H	A
Result	W	W	W	D	D	W	W	W	W	L	W	W	W	L	W	W	W	W	W	D	D	D	W	D	W	L
Position	6	3	3	3	3	2	1	1	1	2	2	2	2	3	3	2	1	3	2	3	3	3	3	2	1	3

A = Away; H = Home; W = Win; D = Draw; L = Loss

== Play-off round ==
The top four teams from Regular season will meet twice (6 matches per team) for places in 2026–27 UEFA Champions League, 2026–27 UEFA Conference League and potentially 2026–27 UEFA Europa League (depending on this season's Greek Cup), as well as deciding the league champion.

Pos	Team	Pld	W	D	L	GF	GA	GD	Pts	Qualification
1	AEK Athens (C)	32	21	9	2	57	20	+37	72	Qualification for the Champions League play-off round
2	Olympiacos	32	19	9	4	51	17	+34	66	Qualification for the Champions League third qualifying round (Note: Olympiacos, as one of the two clubs with the highest club coefficient that would otherwise have entered the League Path second qualifying round, will enter the League Path third qualifying round, due to the rebalancing of the default access list.)
3	PAOK	32	18	10	4	59	25	+34	64	Qualification for the Europa League second qualifying round
4	Panathinaikos	32	14	10	8	47	33	+14	52	Qualification for the Conference League second qualifying round

Source: Super League Greece
Rules for classification: 1) Points; 2) Head-to-head points (Regular season and play-off); 3) Head-to-head goal difference (Regular season and play-off); 4) Regular season position.
(C) Champions

=== Results by round ===
Round	1	2	3	4	5	6
Ground	H	A	H	A	H	A
Result	D	L	W	D	D	D
Position	2	3	2	2	3	3

Updated to match(es) played on 19 April 2026. Source: League matches
A = Away; H = Home; W = Win; D = Draw; L = Loss

=== Matches ===
Sunday, 5 April 2026 1	PAOK	0–0	Panathinaikos	Thessaloniki
19:00 EEST, UTC+03:00	Taison (yellow card) 28'; Sánchez (yellow card) 68'			Stadium: Toumba Stadium; Attendance: 23,485; Referee: Damian Sylwestrzak (Poland)

Sunday, 19 April 2026 2	AEK	3–0	PAOK	Nea Filadelfeia
18:00 EEST, UTC+03:00	Kędziora 36' (o.g.); 73'; 80'		(yellow card) 4' Sánchez; (yellow card) 47' Zafeiris; (yellow card) 51' Konstantelias	Stadium: Agia Sophia Stadium; Attendance: 31,100; Referee: Jesús Gil Manzano (Spain)

Sunday, 3 May 2026 3	PAOK	3–1	Olympiacos	Thessaloniki
19:00 EEST, UTC+03:00	Jeremejeff 15', 65'; Zafeiris (yellow card) 45'; Živković 55'		29'	Stadium: Toumba Stadium; Attendance: 17,705; Referee: Simone Sozza (Italy)

Sunday, 10 May 2026 4	Olympiacos	1–1	PAOK	Piraeus
19:30 EEST, UTC+03:00	61'		(yellow card) 51' Baba; (yellow card) 52' Meïté; 69' Konstantelias; (yellow card) 80' Zafeiris; (yellow card) 89' Jeremejeff; (yellow card) 90+5' Bianco; (yellow card) 90+5' Živković	Stadium: Karaiskakis Stadium; Attendance: 32,005; Referee: José María Sánchez Martínez (Spain)

Wednesday, 13 May 2026 5	PAOK	1–1	AEK	Thessaloniki
19:30 EEST, UTC+03:00	Baba (yellow card) 48'; Bianco (yellow card) 77'; Živković (yellow card) 84'; Mythou 88'		73'	Stadium: Toumba Stadium; Attendance: 14,390; Referee: Sven Jablonski (Germany)

Sunday, 17 May 2026 6	Panathinaikos	2–2	PAOK	Ampelokipoi
19:30 EEST, UTC+03:00	68', 81'		30' Ozdoyev; 35' Mythou; (yellow card) 78' Živković; (yellow card) 80' Ivanušec	Stadium: Leoforos Alexandras Stadium; Attendance: Behind closed doors Referee: Goga Kikacheishvili (Georgia)

=== Greek Cup ===
==== League phase ====
Pos	Team	Pld	W	D	L	GF	GA	GD	Pts	Qualification
6	OFI	4	3	0	1	7	3	+4	9	Advance to Play-offs (seeded)
7	Volos	4	2	1	1	10	7	+3	7	Advance to Play-offs (seeded)
8	PAOK	4	2	1	1	10	7	+3	7	Advance to Play-offs (seeded)
9	Atromitos	4	2	1	1	7	5	+2	7	Advance to Play-offs (unseeded)
10	A.E. Kifisia	4	1	2	1	4	4	0	5	Advance to Play-offs (unseeded)

Updated to match(es) played on 17 December 2025. Source: epo.gr

Round	1	2	3	4	5
Ground	A	-	H	A	H
Result	L	-	W	D	W
Position	19	18	11	12	8

A = Away; H = Home; W = Win; D = Draw; L = Loss

Win Draw Loss Fixtures

17 September 2025 1	Levadiakos	4–1	PAOK	Livadeia
17:30 EEST, UTC+03:00	Kędziora 12' (o.g.); 41', 51' (pen.), 54'	Report	36' (pen.) Chalov; (yellow card) 38' Michailidis; (yellow card) 43' Bianco; (yellow card) 87' Pelkas	Stadium: Levadia Municipal Stadium; Referee: Spyridon Zabalas (Epirus)

29 October 2025 3	PAOK	4–1	AEL	Thessaloniki
21:30 EET UTC+02:00	Ivanušec 2'; Konstantelias 12'; Despodov 18' (pen.); Kenny (yellow card) 27'; Mythou 31'; Bianco (yellow card) 42'	Report	75'	Stadium: Toumba; Referee: Fotis Polychronis (Pieria)

3 December 2025 4	Aris	1–1	PAOK	Thessaloniki
21:30 EET, UTC+02:00	47'		(penalty missed) 16' Despodov; (yellow card) 72' Živković; (yellow card) 76' Chatsidis; (yellow card) 87' Baba; 90+6' Giakoumakis	Stadium: Kleanthis Vikelidis; Referee: Anastasios Papapetrou (Athens)

17 December 2025 5	PAOK	4–1	Marko	Thessaloniki
20:00 EET	Konstantelias 17', 37'; Mythou 26'; Thymianis (yellow card) 50'; Bianco (yellow card) 66'; Camara 90'	Report	84'	Stadium: Toumba; Referee: Dimitris Moschou (Lasithi)

==== Play-offs ====
6 January 2026	PAOK	1–1 (5–4 p)	Atromitos	Thessaloniki
20:00 EET	Živković 54'; Baba (yellow card) 80'		52'	Stadium: Toumba Stadium; Referee: Anastasios Papapetrou (Athens)
	Penalties
	Michailidis (penalty scored); Kenny (penalty scored); Kędziora (penalty scored); Taison (penalty scored); Giakoumakis (penalty scored)		Penalty scored Penalty missed

==== Quarter-finals ====
14 January 2026	Olympiacos	0–2	PAOK	Piraeus
18:30 EET			7' Mythou; 15' Ozdoyev; (yellow card) 53' Taison; (yellow card) 61' Konstantelias; (yellow card) 88' Zafeiris	Stadium: Karaiskakis Stadium; Referee: Alexandros Tsakalidis (Chalkidiki)

==== Semi-finals ====
4 February 2026 First leg	Panathinaikos	0–1	PAOK	Athens
20:30 EET, UTC+02:00		Report	Kenny (yellow card) 28'; Giakoumakis 67' (pen.); Chatsidis (yellow card) 72'	Stadium: Leoforos Alexandras Stadium; Referee: Angelos Evangelou (Athens)

11 February 2026 Second leg	PAOK	2–0 (3–0 agg.)	Panathinaikos	Thessaloniki
20:30 EET, UTC+02:00	Michailidis (yellow card) 33'; Giakoumakis 71', (yellow card) 72'; Chatsidis 87'	Report		Stadium: Toumba Stadium; Referee: Vasilis Fotias (Pella)

==== Final ====
Saturday, 25 April 2026 Greek Cup Final	PAOK	2–3 (a.e.t.)	OFI	Volos
20:30 EEST, UTC+03:00	Michailidis 15'; Konstantelias (yellow card) 62'; Chatsidis (yellow card) 90'; Jeremejeff 90+7'; Bianco (yellow card) 108'		28', 50', 105+4' (pen.)	Stadium: Panthessaliko Stadium; Referee: Angelos Evangelou (Athens)

=== UEFA Europa League ===
==== Third qualifying round ====
Thursday, 7 August 2025 First leg	PAOK	0–0	Wolfsberger AC	Thessaloniki
20:30 EEST	Konstantelias (yellow card) 3'; Meïté (yellow card) 50'; Ivanušec (yellow card) 76'; Ozdoyev (yellow card) 90+5'	Report		Stadium: Toumba Stadium; Attendance: 21,340; Referee: Morten Krogh (Denmark)

Thursday, 14 August 2025 Second leg	Wolfsberger AC	0–1 (a.e.t.) (0–1 agg.)	PAOK	Klagenfurt
20:00 EEST		Report	(yellow card) 44' Ozdoyev; (yellow card) 79' Konstantelias; 115' Camara	Stadium: Wörthersee Stadion; Attendance: 6,720; Referee: Orel Grinfeld (Israel)
Note: Wolfsberger AC will play home matches at the Wörthersee Stadion, in Klagenfurt, instead of their regular venue, the Lavanttal-Arena, in Wolfsberg, which did not meet UEFA requirements.

==== Play-off round ====
Thursday, 21 August 2025 First leg	Rijeka (Croatia)	1–0	(Greece) PAOK	Rijeka, Croatia
21:45 EEST	Janković (yellow card) 21'; Menalo 39'; Čop (yellow card) 67'	Report	(yellow card) 7' Kenny; (yellow card) 46' Ivanušec; (yellow card) 55' Živković; (yellow card) 70' Michailidis; (yellow card) 71' Kędziora	Stadium: Stadion Rujevica; Attendance: 6,882; Referee: Ivan Kružliak (Slovakia)

Thursday, 28 August 2025 Second leg	PAOK (Greece)	5–0 (5–1 agg.)	(Croatia) Rijeka	Thessaloniki, Greece
20:30 EEST	Meite 12'; Konstantelias 25'; Chalov 56'; Giakoumakis 77'; Pelkas 89'	Report	Majstorović (yellow card) 34' (yellow-red card) 71'	Stadium: Toumba Stadium; Attendance: 24,223; Referee: José María Sánchez Martínez (Spain)

==== League phase ====
===== League phase table =====
Pos	Team	Pld	W	D	L	GF	GA	GD	Pts	Qualification
15	(Football Association of Serbia) Red Star Belgrade	8	4	2	2	7	6	+1	14	Advance to knockout phase play-offs (seeded)
16	(Royal Spanish Football Federation) Celta Vigo	8	4	1	3	15	11	+4	13	Advance to knockout phase play-offs (seeded)
17	(Hellenic Football Federation) PAOK	8	3	3	2	17	14	+3	12	Advance to knockout phase play-offs (unseeded)
18	(French Football Federation) Lille	8	4	0	4	12	9	+3	12	Advance to knockout phase play-offs (unseeded)
19	(Turkish Football Federation) Fenerbahçe	8	3	3	2	10	7	+3	12	Advance to knockout phase play-offs (unseeded)

Source: UEFA
Rules for classification: League phase tiebreakers

===== Matches =====
The draw for the league phase pairings was held at the Grimaldi Forum in Monaco on 29 August 2025, 13:00 CEST.

24 September 2025	PAOK (Greece)	0–0	(Israel) Maccabi Tel Aviv	Thessaloniki, Greece
19:45 EEST	Kenny (yellow card) 24'	Report		Stadium: Toumba Stadium; Attendance: 19,667; Referee: Sven Jablonski (Germany)

2 October 2025	Celta Vigo (Spain)	3–1	(Greece) PAOK	Vigo, Spain
22:00 EEST	45+2', 53', 70'	Report	37', (yellow card) 51' Giakoumakis; (yellow card) 90+2' Ozdoyev	Stadium: Balaídos Stadium; Attendance: 20,849; Referee: Igor Pajač (Croatia)

23 October 2025	Lille (France)	3–4	(Greece) PAOK	Villeneuve-d'Ascq, France
22:00 EEST	57', 68', 78'	Report	18' Meïté; 23', (yellow card) 29', (penalty missed) 71', 74' Živković; 42' Konstantelias; (yellow card) 44' (yellow-red card) 90+9' Kędziora; (yellow card) 90+2' Tsiftsis; (yellow card) 90+5' Giakoumakis	Stadium: Stade Pierre-Mauroy; Attendance: 23,666; Referee: Nikola Dabanović (Montenegro)

6 November 2025	PAOK (Greece)	4–0	(Switzerland) Young Boys	Thessaloniki, Greece
22:00 EET	Bianco 54'; Giakoumakis 67'; Konstantelias 72'; Baba 75'; Vogliacco (yellow card) 84'	Report	(red card) 6'	Stadium: Toumba Stadium; Attendance: 21,608; Referee: Srđan Jovanović (Serbia)

27 November 2025	PAOK (Greece)	1–1	(Norway) Brann	Thessaloniki, Greece
19:45 EET	Ivanušec (yellow card) 53', (goal) 64'; Despodov (yellow card) 90+1'	Report	(penalty missed) 18', 89'	Stadium: Toumba Stadium; Attendance: 16,005; Referee: Sascha Stegemann (Germany)

11 December 2025	Ludogorets Razgrad (Bulgaria)	3–3	(Greece) PAOK	Razgrad, Bulgaria
19:45 EET	33', 70', 77'	Report	39' Despodov; 48' Vogliacco; (yellow card) 69' Camara; 90' Mythou	Stadium: Huvepharma Arena; Attendance: 6,433; Referee: Horațiu Feșnic (Romania)

22 January 2026	PAOK (Greece)	2–0	(Spain) Real Betis	Thessaloniki, Greece
19:45 EET	Pelkas (yellow card) 26'; Ozdoyev (yellow card) 51'; Živković 67', (yellow card) 85'; Michailidis (yellow card) 85'; Giakoumakis 86' (pen.)	Report		Stadium: Toumba Stadium; Attendance: 22,221; Referee: Simone Sozza (Italy)

29 January 2026	Lyon (France)	4–2	(Greece) PAOK	Décines-Charpieu, France
22:00 EET	34', 55', (penalty missed) 83', 88', 90+3'	Report	20', (yellow card) 77' Giakoumakis; (yellow card) 35' (yellow-red card) 40' Konstantelias; 66' Meïté	Stadium: Parc Olympique Lyonnais; Attendance: 26,149; Referee: Ricardo de Burgos Bengoetxea (Spain)

==== Knockout phase ====
The draw for the League phase was held on 30 January 2026.

==== Knockout phase play-offs ====
19 February 2026 First leg	PAOK (Greece)	1–2	(Spain) Celta Vigo	Thessaloniki, Greece
19:45 EET	Jeremejeff 77'; Živković (yellow card) 90'	Report	34', 43'	Stadium: Toumba Stadium; Attendance: 20,448; Referee: Ivan Kružliak (Slovakia)

26 February 2026 Second leg	Celta Vigo (Spain)	1–0 (3–1 agg.)	(Greece) PAOK	Vigo, Spain
22:00 EET	63'	Report		Stadium: Balaídos Stadium; Attendance: 21,344; Referee: Marco Guida (Italy)

== Statistics ==
=== Squad statistics ===
The squad was informed and the official page of PAOK FC.

As of 17 May 2026

Appearances denote players in the starting lineup, with the numbers in parentheses denoting appearances as substitute.

No.	Name	Super League		Greek Cup		Europa League		Total	
No.	Name	Apps	Goals	Apps	Goals	Apps	Goals	Apps	Goals
Goalkeepers
1	(Czech Republic) Jiří Pavlenka	20	0	0	0	8	0	28	0
99	(Greece) Antonis Tsiftsis	12 (3)	0	7	0	6	0	25 (3)	0
41	(Greece) Dimitrios Monastirlis	0	0	1	0	0	0	1	0
Defenders
3	(England) Jonjoe Kenny	18 (5)	0	7	0	13	0	38 (5)	0
5	(Greece) Giannis Michailidis	17 (4)	0	8	1	12 (1)	0	37 (5)	1
16	(Poland) Tomasz Kędziora	23	0	7	0	11 (1)	0	41 (1)	0
21	(Ghana) Baba Rahman	20 (5)	2	7 (1)	0	13 (1)	1	40 (7)	3
32	(Scotland) Greg Taylor	12	0	2 (1)	0	1 (2)	0	15 (3)	0
23	(Spain) Joan Sastre	7 (1)	0	2	0	1 (1)	0	10 (2)	0
25	(Greece) Konstantinos Thymianis	0 (3)	0	1 (1)	0	0	0	1 (4)	0
6	(Croatia) Dejan Lovren	17	0	0	0	1	0	18	0
4	(Italy) Alessandro Vogliacco	7 (1)	1	2	0	4	1	13 (1)	2
35	(Mexico) Jorge Sánchez	7 (3)	0	0	0	1	0	8 (3)	0
Midfielders
8	(France) Soualiho Meïté	21 (1)	0	6 (1)	0	11 (1)	3	38 (3)	3
65	(Greece) Giannis Konstantelias	18 (6)	8	5	3	9 (2)	3	32 (8)	14
2	(Guinea) Mady Camara	4 (19)	0	2 (5)	1	4 (8)	1	10 (32)	2
27	(Russia) Magomed Ozdoyev	22 (8)	8	7	1	10 (3)	0	39 (11)	9
18	(Croatia) Luka Ivanušec	6 (14)	0	3	1	4 (4)	1	13 (18)	2
10	(Greece) Dimitrios Pelkas	7 (7)	4	2 (3)	0	1 (4)	1	10 (14)	5
22	(Italy) Alessandro Bianco	4 (9)	1	4 (1)	0	4 (2)	1	12 (12)	2
20	(Greece) Christos Zafeiris	16	0	0 (4)	0	2	0	18 (4)	0
Forwards
14	(Serbia) Andrija Živković	21 (3)	3	7	1	10 (3)	3	38 (6)	7
77	(Bulgaria) Kiril Despodov	8 (10)	3	3	1	5 (4)	1	16 (14)	5
11	(Brazil) Taison	22 (7)	6	5 (4)	0	8 (2)	0	35 (13)	6
56	(Greece) Anestis Mythou	2 (8)	3	7 (1)	3	0 (6)	1	9 (15)	7
52	(Greece) Dimitris Chatsidis	11 (1)	3	0 (6)	1	1 (3)	0	12 (10)	4
7	(Greece) Giorgos Giakoumakis	16 (6)	7	0 (5)	3	7 (2)	5	23 (13)	15
39	(Greece) Dimitrios Berdos	0 (1)	0	1 (1)	0	0	0	1 (2)	0
19	(Sweden) Alexander Jeremejeff	10 (6)	7	1 (1)	1	1 (1)	1	12 (8)	9
Players transferred out during the season
47	(England) Shola Shoretire	0	0	0	0	0 (1)	0	0 (1)	0
9	(Russia) Fyodor Chalov	4 (6)	1	1 (3)	1	6 (4)	1	11 (13)	3
88	(Georgia (country)) Luka Gugeshashvili	0	0	1	0	0	0	1	0

=== Goalscorers ===
As of 17 May 2026

Rank	No.	Pos.	Player	Super League	Greek Cup	Europa League	Total
1	7	FW	(Greece) Giakoumakis	7	3	5	15
2	65	MF	(Greece) Konstantelias	8	3	3	14
3	19	FW	(Sweden) Jeremejeff	7	1	1	9
	27	MF	(Russia) Ozdoyev	8	1	0	9
5	14	MF	(Serbia) Živković	3	1	3	7
	56	FW	(Greece) Mythou	3	3	1	7
7	11	FW	(Brazil) Taison	6	0	0	6
8	77	FW	(Bulgaria) Despodov	3	1	1	5
	10	MF	(Greece) Pelkas	4	0	1	5
10	52	FW	(Greece) Chatsidis	3	1	0	4
11	9	FW	(Russia) Chalov	1	1	1	3
	8	MF	(France) Meïté	0	0	3	3
	21	DF	(Ghana) Baba	2	0	1	3
14	22	MF	(Italy) Bianco	1	0	1	2
	18	MF	(Croatia) Ivanušec	0	1	1	2
	2	MF	(Guinea) Camara	0	1	1	2
	4	DF	(Italy) Vogliacco	1	0	1	2
18	5	DF	(Greece) Michailidis	0	1	0	1
Own goals				2	0	0	2
TOTAL				59	18	24	101

=== Clean sheets ===
As of 17 May 2026

Player	League	Cup	EL	Total	Games played	Percentage
(Czech Republic) Jiří Pavlenka	9		4	13	28	46,43%
(Georgia (country)) Luka Gugeshashvili		0			1	0,00%
(Greece) Antonis Tsiftsis	10	3	2	15	28	53,57%
(Greece) Dimitrios Monastirlis		0			1	0,00%
Total	19	3	6	28	58	48,28%

=== Disciplinary record ===
As of 17 May 2026

S	P	N	Name	Super League			Greek Cup			Europa League			Total		
S	P	N	Name	Yellow card	Yellow-red card	Red card	Yellow card	Yellow-red card	Red card	Yellow card	Yellow-red card	Red card	Yellow card	Yellow-red card	Red card
65	MF	(Greece)	Konstantelias	2	0	0	2	0	0	2	1	0	6	1	0
8	MF	(France)	Meïté	2	0	1	0	0	0	1	0	0	3	0	1
18	MF	(Croatia)	Ivanušec	4	0	0	0	0	0	3	0	0	7	0	0
27	MF	(Russia)	Ozdoyev	3	0	0	0	0	0	4	0	0	7	0	0
3	DF	(England)	Kenny	3	0	0	2	0	0	2	0	0	7	0	0
14	FW	(Serbia)	Živković	8	0	0	1	0	0	4	0	0	13	0	0
5	DF	(Greece)	Michailidis	1	0	0	2	0	0	2	0	0	5	0	0
16	DF	(Poland)	Kędziora	4	0	0	0	0	0	1	1	0	5	1	0
7	FW	(Greece)	Giakoumakis	2	0	0	1	0	0	3	0	0	6	0	0
10	MF	(Greece)	Pelkas	1	0	0	1	0	0	1	0	0	3	0	0
21	DF	(Ghana)	Baba	3	0	0	2	0	0	0	0	0	5	0	0
22	MF	(Italy)	Bianco	4	0	0	4	0	0	0	0	0	8	0	0
2	MF	(Guinea)	Camara	2	0	0	0	0	0	1	0	0	3	0	0
99	GK	(Greece)	Tsiftsis	2	0	0	0	0	0	1	0	0	3	0	0
4	DF	(Italy)	Vogliacco	1	0	0	0	0	0	1	0	0	2	0	0
11	FW	(Brazil)	Taison	3	0	0	1	0	0	0	0	0	4	0	0
77	FW	(Bulgaria)	Despodov	1	0	0	0	0	0	1	0	0	2	0	0
6	DF	(Croatia)	Lovren	2	0	0	0	0	0	0	0	0	2	0	0
52	FW	(Greece)	Chatsidis	0	0	0	3	0	0	0	0	0	3	0	0
25	DF	(Greece)	Thymianis	0	0	0	1	0	0	0	0	0	1	0	0
20	MF	(Greece)	Zafeiris	5	0	0	1	0	0	0	0	0	6	0	0
35	DF	(Mexico)	Sánchez	2	0	0	0	0	0	0	0	0	2	0	0
19	FW	(Sweden)	Jeremejeff	1	0	0	0	0	0	0	0	0	1	0	0
Players transferred out during the season
