= Greg Taylor (Scottish footballer) =

Scottish footballer (born 1997)

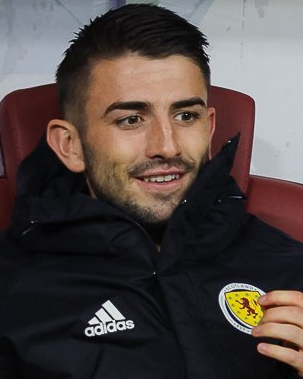
- Taylor with Scotland in 2019

Personal information
- Full name: Greg John Taylor
- Date of birth: 5 November 1997 (age 29)
- Place of birth: Greenock, Inverclyde, Scotland
- Height: 5 ft 7 in (1.70 m)
- Positions: Left-back; defensive midfielder

Team information
- Current team: PAOK
- Number: 32

Youth career
- 2008–2014: Rangers
- 2014–2016: Kilmarnock

Senior career*
Years	Team	Apps	(Gls)
2016–2019	Kilmarnock	111	(1)
2019–2025	Celtic	156	(6)
2025–	PAOK	14	(0)

International career
2017	Scotland U20	5	(1)
2017–2018	Scotland U21	14	(0)
2019–2024	Scotland	14	(0)
- * Club domestic league appearances and goals as of 23:43, 30 August 2026 (UTC)

Greg John Taylor (born 5 November 1997) is a Scottish professional footballer who plays as a left-back for Super League Greece club PAOK and the Scotland national team. He was in the Rangers youth system but was released and then signed for Kilmarnock, where he made his senior debut. After three seasons in the Kilmarnock first team, Taylor was sold to Celtic in September 2019. He won five Scottish league championships in six seasons with Celtic, and then signed for Super League Greece club PAOK in 2025.

After playing regularly for the Scotland under-21 team, Taylor made his full international debut for Scotland in June 2019.

== Club career ==
=== Early years ===
Taylor started his career as a youth player at Rangers and was associated with the Ibrox club for six years until he was released, with the club saying he was "too small and too slight." He then signed for Kilmarnock in July 2014, and captained their under-17 and under-20 youth teams before making his progression into first team football in 2016.

=== Kilmarnock ===
Taylor made his first team debut for Kilmarnock on 14 May 2016, starting at left back in a Scottish Premiership game against Dundee United. He then made his second start in the second leg of the Scottish Premiership Play-off Final, which Kilmarnock won 4–0 against Falkirk to win the tie 4–1 on aggregate. After the 2015–16 season ended, Taylor signed a three-year contract with Kilmarnock.

Having kept his place in the team under managers Lee Clark, Lee McCulloch and Steve Clarke (the latter of whom oversaw a dramatic improvement in the club's form during 2017–18), Taylor was rewarded with another new contract in April 2018, running until June 2021. Taylor scored his first goal for the club, the first in a 5–0 win against Hamilton Accies on 30 March 2019.

During the summer 2019 transfer window, Kilmarnock rejected offers for Taylor from Nürnberg, Sunderland and Celtic.

=== Celtic ===
Taylor signed a four-year contract with Celtic on 2 September 2019. He made his debut for the club against St Mirren at Celtic Park in a 2–0 home win in the Scottish Premiership on 30 October 2019.

On 18 August 2020, Taylor scored his first goal for Celtic in a UEFA Champions League qualifying match against KR Reykjavík in a 6–0 victory.

On 20 December 2020, Taylor started for Celtic in the delayed 2020 Scottish Cup final against Scottish Championship side Heart of Midlothian. In a dramatic match which seen both sides draw each other 3–3 after extra-time, Celtic won on penalties and lifted their 12th successive domestic honour as part of an unprecedented quadruple treble. This would also see Taylor collect his first Scottish Cup winners' medal and his second honour with Celtic.

During the 2021–22 Scottish Premiership season, Taylor established himself as an integral part of Celtic's team under manager Ange Postecoglou. In November 2021 he signed a contract extension with Celtic, which is due to run until 2025. On 19 December 2021, Taylor started for Celtic in the 2021–22 Scottish League Cup final against Hibernian and went on to collect another cup winners' medal, following a brace from Kyogo Furuhashi which sealed a 2–1 victory and ultimately the Scottish League Cup for Celtic that season.

On 6 September 2022, Taylor played in his first UEFA Champions League group stage match in a 3–0 home defeat against Real Madrid. On 22 October 2022, Taylor scored the winning goal in a 4–3 victory against Heart of Midlothian at Tynecastle Park in the Scottish Premiership.

Taylor left Celtic at the end of his contract, after the 2024–25 season ended.

=== PAOK ===
Taylor signed for Super League Greece club PAOK on 1 July 2025.

== International career ==
In March 2017, Taylor played in his first match for the Scotland under-21 side in a friendly against Estonia.

Taylor was selected for the Scotland under-20 squad for the 2017 Toulon Tournament. In the second match, he scored the only goal in a 1–0 win against Brazil U20, which was Scotland's first-ever win against Brazil at any level. The team went on to claim the bronze medal, their first podium finish in the competition. Taylor was also the only Scottish player named in the 'team of the tournament', as well as being named fourth-best player.

The under-21 squad took part in the 2018 Toulon Tournament and Taylor was again part of the squad; Scotland lost to Turkey under-21s in a penalty-out and finished fourth.

Taylor was named in the full Scotland squad for UEFA Euro 2020 qualifying fixtures in June 2019; he remained on the bench in the home game against Cyprus at Hampden Park. After captain Andy Robertson picked up an injury, Taylor debuted at left-back against the world's top-ranked team, Belgium on 11 June, and played the full match in Brussels as Scotland lost 3–0. Manager Steve Clarke hailed Taylor's debut as "excellent".

He then played in the next two games, on 16 and 19 November, wins against Kazakhstan and Cyprus. His performances were praised, especially for his link-up play with Celtic teammate, James Forrest, on the left flank.

== Personal life ==
Taylor was born in Greenock and raised in nearby Gourock, attending Clydeview Academy. His younger brother Ally Taylor is also a footballer, and made his first team debut for Kilmarnock in February 2020 while Greg was playing for their opponents Celtic.

== Career statistics ==
=== Club ===
As of match played 13 August 2026

Appearances and goals by club, season and competition
Club	Season	League			National cup (Note: Includes Scottish Cup, Greek Football Cup)		League cup (Note: Includes Scottish League Cup)		Europe		Other		Total	
Club	Season	Division	Apps	Goals	Apps	Goals	Apps	Goals	Apps	Goals	Apps	Goals	Apps	Goals
Kilmarnock	2015–16	Scottish Premiership	1	0	0	0	0	0	—		1 (Note: Appearance in Scottish Premiership play-offs)	0	2	0
Kilmarnock	2016–17	Scottish Premiership	34	0	1	0	3	0	—		—		38	0
Kilmarnock	2017–18	Scottish Premiership	38	0	3	0	4	0	—		—		45	0
Kilmarnock	2018–19	Scottish Premiership	36	1	2	0	3	0	—		—		41	1
Kilmarnock	2019–20	Scottish Premiership	2	0	—		1	0	2 (Note: Appearances in UEFA Europa League)	0	—		5	0
Kilmarnock	Total		111	1	6	0	11	0	2	0	1	0	131	1
Celtic	2019–20	Scottish Premiership	12	0	3	0	—		2	0	—		17	0
Celtic	2020–21	Scottish Premiership	26	0	1	0	0	0	5 (Note: Two appearances and one goal in UEFA Champions League, three appearances in UEFA Europa League)	1	—		32	1
Celtic	2021–22	Scottish Premiership	24	0	2	1	2	0	7 (Note: Two appearances in UEFA Champions League, four appearances in UEFA Europa League, one appearance in UEFA Conference League)	0	—		35	1
Celtic	2022–23	Scottish Premiership	31	3	4	0	2	0	6 (Note: Appearances in UEFA Champions League)	0	—		43	3
Celtic	2023–24	Scottish Premiership	35	3	4	0	1	0	6	0	—		46	3
Celtic	2024–25	Scottish Premiership	28	0	3	0	4	1	8	0	—		43	1
Celtic	Total		156	6	17	1	9	1	34	1	—		216	9
PAOK	2025–26	Super League Greece	12	0	3	0	—		3	0	—		18	0
PAOK	2026–27	Super League Greece	1	0	0	0	—		3 (Note: Two appearances in UEFA Europa League, one appearance in UEFA Conference League)	0	—		4	0
PAOK	Total		13	0	3	0	—		6	0	—		22	0
Career total			280	7	26	1	20	1	42	1	1	0	369	10

=== International ===
Appearances and goals by national team and year
National team	Year	Apps	Goals
Scotland	2019	3	0
Scotland	2020	1	0
Scotland	2021	1	0
Scotland	2022	5	0
Scotland	2023	3	0
Scotland	2024	1	0
Total		14	0

== Honours ==
Celtic

- Scottish Premiership (5): 2019–20, 2021–22, 2022–23, 2023–24, 2024–25
- Scottish Cup (3): 2019–20, 2022–23, 2023–24
- Scottish League Cup (3): 2021–22 2022–23, 2024–25

Individual

- Toulon Tournament Best XI: 2017
- PFA Scotland Team of the Year (Premiership): 2022–23
