= 2020–21 Celtic F.C. season =

Celtic F.C.
2020–21 season
- Chairman: Ian Bankier
- Manager: Neil Lennon (until 24 February); John Kennedy (Interim from 24 February)
- Scottish Premiership: 2nd
- Scottish Cup: Fourth round
- League Cup: Second round
- Champions League: Second qualifying round
- Europa League: Group stage
- Top goalscorer: League: Odsonne Édouard (18); All: Odsonne Édouard (22)
Home colours	Away colours	Third colours

The 2020–21 season was Celtic's 127th season of competitive football. They competed in the Scottish Premiership, Scottish Cup, League Cup, UEFA Champions League and UEFA Europa League. The club failed to win a trophy for first time since 2010.

== Pre-season and friendlies ==
Celtic held a pre-season training camp in Loughborough (England), before continuing their preparations in France with friendlies against Nice, Lyon and Paris Saint-Germain. They rounded off pre-season with friendlies against Ross County and Hibernian at Celtic Park.

16 July 2020 Friendly	Nice	1–1	Celtic	Décines-Charpieu, France
17:15 BST	Dolberg 38'	Report	Klimala 73'	Stadium: Parc Olympique Lyonnais

18 July 2020 Friendly	Lyon	2–1	Celtic	Décines-Charpieu, France
19:45 BST	Dembélé 4'; Depay 40'	Report	Elyounoussi 87'	Stadium: Parc Olympique Lyonnais

21 July 2020 Friendly	Paris Saint-Germain	4–0	Celtic	Paris, France
18:00 BST	Mbappé 1'; Neymar 25'; Herrera 48'; Sarabia 67'	Report		Stadium: Parc des Princes

26 July 2020 Friendly	Celtic	2–0	Ross County	Glasgow
13:00 BST	Donaldson 3' (o.g.); Elyounoussi 14'	Report		Stadium: Celtic Park

27 July 2020 Friendly	Celtic	3–1	Hibernian	Glasgow
13:30 BST	Dembélé 41'; Klimala 78', 83'	Report	Doig 14'	Stadium: Celtic Park

== Scottish Premiership ==
The Scottish Premiership fixture list was announced on 6 July 2020. Celtic began their title defence against Hamilton Academical at Celtic Park.

2 August 2020	Celtic	5–1	Hamilton Academical	Glasgow
16:30 BST	Édouard 20', 49', 53'; Frimpong 31'; Klimala 90'	BBC Sport; Celtic Report	Martin 34'	Stadium: Celtic Park; Attendance: 0 Referee: Willie Collum

9 August 2020	Kilmarnock	1–1	Celtic	Kilmarnock
16:30 BST	Burke 24' (pen.)	BBC Sport; Celtic Report	Christie 11'	Stadium: Rugby Park; Attendance: 0 Referee: Alan Muir

22 August 2020	Dundee United	0–1	Celtic	Dundee
17:30 BST		BBC Sport; Celtic Report	Ajeti 83'	Stadium: Tannadice Park; Attendance: 0 Referee: Andrew Dallas

30 August 2020	Celtic	3–0	Motherwell	Glasgow
15:00 BST	Forrest 40'; Ajeti 74'; Jullien 90+2'	BBC Sport; Celtic Report		Stadium: Celtic Park; Attendance: 0 Referee: Don Robertson

12 September 2020	Ross County	0–5	Celtic	Dingwall
15:00 BST		BBC Sport; Celtic Report	Édouard 4' (pen.); Ajeti 20'; Duffy 59'; Ajer 64'; Klimala 75'	Stadium: Victoria Park; Attendance: 300; Referee: Andrew Dallas

16 September 2020	St Mirren	1–2	Celtic	Paisley
19:45 BST	Erwin 3'	BBC Sport; Celtic Report	Duffy 21'; Forrest 36'	Stadium: St Mirren Park; Attendance: 0 Referee: John Beaton

19 September 2020	Celtic	3–2	Livingston	Glasgow
15:00 BST	McGregor 20'; Christie 23'; Ajeti 52'	BBC Sport; Celtic Report	Holt 16' (pen.); Serrano 78'	Stadium: Celtic Park; Attendance: 0 Referee: Gavin Duncan

27 September 2020	Celtic	3–0	Hibernian	Glasgow
15:00 BST	McGregor 7'; Ajeti 35'; Elyounoussi 79'	BBC Sport; Celtic Report		Stadium: Celtic Park; Attendance: 0 Referee: Steven McLean

4 October 2020	St Johnstone	0–2	Celtic	Perth
12:00 BST		BBC Sport; Celtic Report	Griffiths 90'; Klimala 90+3'	Stadium: McDiarmid Park; Attendance: 0 Referee: Nick Walsh

17 October 2020	Celtic	0–2	Rangers	Glasgow
12:30 BST		BBC Sport; Celtic Report	Goldson 9', 54'	Stadium: Celtic Park; Attendance: 0 Referee: John Beaton

25 October 2020	Aberdeen	3–3	Celtic	Aberdeen
12:00 GMT	Ferguson 43' (pen.), 90+2' (pen.); Hedges 65'	BBC Sport; Celtic Report	McGregor 52'; Griffiths 76'; Christie 78' (pen.)	Stadium: Pittodrie Stadium; Attendance: 0 Referee: Willie Collum

8 November 2020	Motherwell	1–4	Celtic	Motherwell
12:00 GMT	Gallagher 72'	BBC Sport; Celtic Report	Elyounoussi 8', 27', 76'; Ntcham 86'	Stadium: Fir Park; Attendance: 0 Referee: Andrew Dallas

21 November 2020	Hibernian	2–2	Celtic	Edinburgh
15:00 GMT	Murphy 52'; Nisbet 59'	BBC Sport; Celtic Report	Édouard 79' (pen.); Laxalt 90+1'	Stadium: Easter Road; Attendance: 0 Referee: Bobby Madden

6 December 2020	Celtic	1–1	St Johnstone	Glasgow
15:00 GMT	Elyounoussi 83'	BBC Sport; Celtic Report	Kane 79'	Stadium: Celtic Park; Attendance: 0 Referee: David Munro

13 December 2020	Celtic	2–0	Kilmarnock	Glasgow
15:00 GMT	Elyounoussi 57'; Duffy 70'	BBC Sport; Celtic Report		Stadium: Celtic Park; Attendance: 0 Referee: Don Robertson

23 December 2020	Celtic	2–0	Ross County	Glasgow
18:00 GMT	Turnbull 24'; Griffiths 61'	BBC Sport; Celtic Report		Stadium: Celtic Park; Attendance: 0 Referee: Euan Anderson

26 December 2020	Hamilton Academical	0–3	Celtic	Hamilton
15:00 GMT		BBC Sport; Celtic Report	Édouard 49' (pen.); Griffiths 54'; Turnbull 74'	Stadium: New Douglas Park; Attendance: 0 Referee: Don Robertson

30 December 2020	Celtic	3–0	Dundee United	Glasgow
15:00 GMT	Soro 23'; Turnbull 40'; Édouard 75'	BBC Sport; Celtic Report		Stadium: Celtic Park; Attendance: 0 Referee: Willie Collum

2 January 2021	Rangers	1–0	Celtic	Glasgow
12:30 GMT	McGregor 70' (o.g.)	BBC Sport; Celtic Report		Stadium: Ibrox Stadium; Attendance: 0 Referee: Bobby Madden

11 January 2021	Celtic	1–1	Hibernian	Glasgow
19:45 GMT	Turnbull 81'	BBC Sport; Celtic Report	Nisbet 90+1'	Stadium: Celtic Park; Attendance: 0 Referee: Nick Walsh

16 January 2021	Celtic	0–0	Livingston	Glasgow
15:00 GMT		BBC Sport; Celtic Report		Stadium: Celtic Park; Attendance: 0 Referee: John Beaton

20 January 2021	Livingston	2–2	Celtic	Livingston
20:15 GMT	Brown 15'; Emmanuel-Thomas 60'	BBC Sport; Celtic Report	Elyounoussi 28'; Bitton 38'	Stadium: Almondvale Stadium; Attendance: 0 Referee: Willie Collum

27 January 2021	Celtic	2–0	Hamilton Academical	Glasgow
19:45 GMT	Griffiths 12'; Édouard 48'	BBC Sport; Celtic Report		Stadium: Celtic Park; Attendance: 0 Referee: Colin Steven

30 January 2021	Celtic	1–2	St Mirren	Glasgow
15:00 GMT	Édouard 32'	BBC Sport; Celtic Report	Dennis 18'; Durmuş 37'	Stadium: Celtic Park; Attendance: 0 Referee: Bobby Madden

2 February 2021	Kilmarnock	0–4	Celtic	Kilmarnock
19:45 GMT		BBC Sport; Celtic Report	Brown 29'; Édouard 53' (pen.), 62'; Ajeti 86'	Stadium: Rugby Park; Attendance: 0 Referee: Kevin Clancy

6 February 2021	Celtic	2–1	Motherwell	Glasgow
15:00 GMT	Welsh 2'; Édouard 50'	BBC Sport; Celtic Report	Campbell 66'	Stadium: Celtic Park; Attendance: 0 Referee: Nick Walsh

10 February 2021	St Mirren	0–4	Celtic	Paisley
20:00 GMT		BBC Sport; Celtic Report	Rogic 16'; Édouard 79' (pen.); Christie 82'; Turnbull 83'	Stadium: St Mirren Park; Attendance: 0 Referee: Don Robertson

14 February 2021	St Johnstone	1–2	Celtic	Perth
12:00 GMT	Rooney 50'	BBC Sport; Celtic Report	Édouard 60', 62'	Stadium: McDiarmid Park; Attendance: 0 Referee: Steven McLean

17 February 2021	Celtic	1–0	Aberdeen	Glasgow
18:00 GMT	Turnbull 14'	BBC Sport; Celtic Report		Stadium: Celtic Park; Attendance: 0 Referee: Alan Muir

21 February 2021	Ross County	1–0	Celtic	Dingwall
19:30 GMT	White 71'	BBC Sport; Celtic Report		Stadium: Victoria Park; Attendance: 0 Referee: David Munro

27 February 2021	Celtic	1–0	Aberdeen	Glasgow
15:00 GMT	Édouard 8'	BBC Sport; Celtic Report		Stadium: Celtic Park; Attendance: 0 Referee: Willie Collum

7 March 2021	Dundee United	0–0	Celtic	Dundee
12:00 GMT		BBC Sport; Celtic Report		Stadium: Tannadice Park; Attendance: 0 Referee: Kevin Clancy

21 March 2021	Celtic	1–1	Rangers	Glasgow
12:00 GMT	Elyounoussi 23'	BBC Sport; Celtic Report	Morelos 38'	Stadium: Celtic Park; Attendance: 0 Referee: Willie Collum

10 April 2021	Celtic	6–0	Livingston	Glasgow
15:00 BST	Forrest 30'; Turnbull 38'; Fitzwater 50' (o.g.); Elyounoussi 54', 66'; Christie 87'	BBC Sport; Celtic Report		Stadium: Celtic Park; Attendance: 0 Referee: Nick Walsh

21 April 2021	Aberdeen	1–1	Celtic	Aberdeen
19:45 BST	Ferguson 18'	BBC Sport; Celtic Report	Griffiths 90+3'	Stadium: Pittodrie Stadium; Attendance: 0 Referee: Willie Collum

2 May 2021	Rangers	4–1	Celtic	Glasgow
12:00 BST	Roofe 26', 57'; Morelos 33'; Defoe 90+2'	BBC Sport; Celtic Report	Édouard 30'	Stadium: Ibrox Stadium; Attendance: 0 Referee: Nick Walsh

12 May 2021	Celtic	4–0	St Johnstone	Glasgow
18:30 BST	Turnbull 23'; Édouard 24'; Ajer 79'; Karamoko 85'	BBC Sport; Celtic Report		Stadium: Celtic Park; Attendance: 0 Referee: Bobby Madden

15 May 2021	Hibernian	0–0	Celtic	Edinburgh
12:30 BST		BBC Sport; Celtic Report		Stadium: Easter Road; Attendance: 0 Referee: Willie Collum

== Scottish Cup ==
On 23 March, it was determined that Celtic would face Falkirk at Celtic Park in the third round of the 2020–21 Scottish Cup. On 4 April, it was determined that Celtic would face Rangers at Ibrox Stadium in the fourth round.

3 April 2021 Third round	Celtic	3–0	Falkirk	Glasgow
19:30 BST	Forrest 56'; Christie 58'; Elyounoussi 79'	BBC Sport; Celtic Report		Stadium: Celtic Park; Attendance: 0 Referee: John Beaton

18 April 2021 Fourth round	Rangers	2–0	Celtic	Glasgow
15:00 BST	Davis 10'; Kenny 34' (o.g.)	BBC Sport; Celtic Report		Stadium: Ibrox Stadium; Attendance: 0 Referee: Bobby Madden

== Scottish League Cup ==
On 15 November, Celtic were drawn to face Ross County at Celtic Park in the second round of the 2020–21 Scottish League Cup.

29 November 2020 Second round	Celtic	0–2	Ross County	Glasgow
14:00 GMT		BBC Sport; Celtic Report	Stewart 39' (pen.); Iacovitti 84'	Stadium: Celtic Park; Attendance: 0 Referee: Kevin Clancy

== UEFA Champions League ==
Celtic entered the Champions League at the first qualifying round. Due to the COVID-19 pandemic, all qualifiers were played as one-legged ties.

=== First qualifying round ===
On 9 August, Celtic were drawn to face KR Reykjavík (Iceland) in the first qualifying round of the UEFA Champions League.

18 August 2020 1Q	Celtic (Scotland)	6–0	(Iceland) KR Reykjavík	Glasgow
19:45 BST	Elyounoussi 6', 90+1'; Aðalsteinsson 17' (o.g.); Jullien 31'; Taylor 46'; Édouard 72'	Report		Stadium: Celtic Park; Attendance: 0 Referee: Sebastian Gishamer (Austria)

=== Second qualifying round ===
On 19 August, it was determined that Celtic would face Ferencváros (Hungary) in the second qualifying round of the UEFA Champions League.

26 August 2020 2Q	Celtic (Scotland)	1–2	(Hungary) Ferencváros	Glasgow
19:45 BST	Christie 53'	Report	Sigér 7'; Nguen 75'	Stadium: Celtic Park; Attendance: 0 Referee: Allard Lindhout (Netherlands)

== UEFA Europa League ==
Celtic entered the Europa League at the third qualifying round.

=== Third qualifying round ===
On 18 September, it was determined that Celtic would face Riga (Latvia) in the third qualifying round of the UEFA Europa League.

24 September 2020 3Q	Riga (Latvia)	0–1	(Scotland) Celtic	Riga, Latvia
18:00 BST		Report	Elyounoussi 90'	Stadium: Skonto Stadium; Attendance: 0 Referee: Fábio Veríssimo (Portugal)

=== Play-off round ===
On 24 September, it was determined that Celtic would face Sarajevo (Bosnia and Herzegovina) in the play-off round of the UEFA Europa League.

1 October 2020 PO	Sarajevo (Bosnia and Herzegovina)	0–1	(Scotland) Celtic	Zenica, Bosnia and Herzegovina
19:00 BST		Report	Édouard 70'	Stadium: Bilino Polje Stadium; Attendance: 0 Referee: Benoît Bastien (France)

=== Group stage ===
On 2 October, the draw for the 2020–21 UEFA Europa League group stage was made. Celtic were drawn in Group H along with Sparta Prague (Pot 2), Milan (Pot 3) and Lille (Pot 4).

==== Group H ====
Pos	Team	Pld	W	D	L	GF	GA	GD	Pts	Qualification	MIL	LOSC	SPP	CEL
1	(Italy) Milan	6	4	1	1	12	7	+5	13	Advance to knockout phase	—	0–3	3–0	4–2
2	(France) Lille	6	3	2	1	14	8	+6	11	Advance to knockout phase	1–1	—	2–1	2–2
3	(Czech Republic) Sparta Prague	6	2	0	4	10	12	−2	6		0–1	1–4	—	4–1
4	(Scotland) Celtic	6	1	1	4	10	19	−9	4		1–3	3–2	1–4	—

Source: UEFA
Rules for classification: Group stage tiebreakers

==== Matches ====
22 October 2020 Matchday 1	Celtic (Scotland)	1–3	(Italy) Milan	Glasgow
20:00 BST	Elyounoussi 76'	Report	Krunić 14'; Brahim 42'; Hauge 90+2'	Stadium: Celtic Park; Attendance: 0 Referee: Matej Jug (Slovenia)

29 October 2020 Matchday 2	Lille (France)	2–2	(Scotland) Celtic	Villeneuve-d'Ascq, France
17:55 GMT	Çelik 67'; Ikoné 75'	Report	Elyounoussi 28', 33'	Stadium: Stade Pierre-Mauroy; Attendance: 0 Referee: Aleksandar Stavrev (North Macedonia)

5 November 2020 Matchday 3	Celtic (Scotland)	1–4	(Czech Republic) Sparta Prague	Glasgow
20:00 GMT	Griffiths 65'	Report	Juliš 26', 45', 77'; Krejčí 90'	Stadium: Celtic Park; Attendance: 0 Referee: István Kovács (Romania)

26 November 2020 Matchday 4	Sparta Prague (Czech Republic)	4–1	(Scotland) Celtic	Prague, Czech Republic
17:55 GMT	Hancko 26'; Juliš 38', 80'; Plavšić 90+4'	Report	Édouard 15'	Stadium: Stadion Letná; Attendance: 0 Referee: Tobias Stieler (Germany)

3 December 2020 Matchday 5	Milan (Italy)	4–2	(Scotland) Celtic	Milan, Italy
17:55 GMT	Çalhanoğlu 24'; Castillejo 26'; Hauge 50'; Brahim 82'	Report	Rogic 7'; Édouard 14'	Stadium: San Siro; Attendance: 0 Referee: Ricardo de Burgos Bengoetxea (Spain)

10 December 2020 Matchday 6	Celtic (Scotland)	3–2	(France) Lille	Glasgow
20:00 GMT	Jullien 22'; McGregor 28' (pen.); Turnbull 75'	Report	Ikoné 24'; Weah 71'	Stadium: Celtic Park; Attendance: 0 Referee: Fábio Veríssimo (Portugal)

== Statistics ==
Note: Statistics for the delayed 2019–20 Scottish Cup semi-final played on 1 November 2020 and final played on 20 December 2020 are recorded under the 2019–20 Celtic F.C. season article.

=== Appearances and goals ===
No.	Pos	Nat	Player	Total		Premiership		League Cup		Scottish Cup		Champions League		Europa League	
No.	Pos	Nat	Player	Apps	Goals	Apps	Goals	Apps	Goals	Apps	Goals	Apps	Goals	Apps	Goals
Goalkeepers
1	GK	(Greece) GRE	Vasilis Barkas	22	0	15	0	1	0	0	0	2	0	4	0
29	GK	(Scotland) SCO	Scott Bain	23	0	18	0	0	0	2	0	0	0	3	0
65	GK	(Northern Ireland) NIR	Conor Hazard	6	0	5	0	0	0	0	0	0	0	1	0
Defenders
2	DF	(France) FRA	Christopher Jullien	14	3	9	1	1	0	0	0	2	1	2	1
3	DF	(Scotland) SCO	Greg Taylor	32	1	26	0	0	0	1	0	2	1	3	0
4	DF	(Republic of Ireland) IRL	Shane Duffy	25	3	18	3	1	0	0	0	0	0	6	0
16	DF	(England) ENG	Jonjoe Kenny	16	0	14	0	0	0	2	0	0	0	0	0
35	DF	(Norway) NOR	Kristoffer Ajer	46	2	35	2	1	0	2	0	1	0	7	0
54	DF	(Scotland) SCO	Adam Montgomery	2	0	2	0	0	0	0	0	0	0	0	0
56	DF	(Scotland) SCO	Anthony Ralston	1	0	1	0	0	0	0	0	0	0	0	0
57	DF	(Scotland) SCO	Stephen Welsh	21	1	16	1	0	0	2	0	0	0	3	0
93	DF	(Uruguay) URU	Diego Laxalt	26	1	17	1	1	0	2	0	0	0	6	0
Midfielders
6	MF	(Israel) ISR	Nir Bitton	21	1	14	1	1	0	0	0	1	0	5	0
8	MF	(Scotland) SCO	Scott Brown (captain)	43	1	31	1	1	0	2	0	2	0	7	0
12	MF	(Ivory Coast) CIV	Ismaila Soro	23	1	19	1	0	0	1	0	0	0	3	0
14	MF	(Scotland) SCO	David Turnbull	34	9	31	8	0	0	2	0	0	0	1	1
17	MF	(Scotland) SCO	Ryan Christie	46	7	34	5	1	0	2	1	2	1	7	0
18	MF	(Australia) AUS	Tom Rogic	31	2	23	1	1	0	1	0	0	0	6	1
19	MF	(Scotland) SCO	Mikey Johnston	10	0	10	0	0	0	0	0	0	0	0	0
27	MF	(Norway) NOR	Mohamed Elyounoussi	46	17	34	10	1	0	2	1	2	2	7	4
42	MF	(Scotland) SCO	Callum McGregor	49	4	37	3	1	0	1	0	2	0	8	1
49	MF	(Scotland) SCO	James Forrest	17	4	13	3	0	0	1	1	2	0	1	0
77	MF	(England) ENG	Karamoko Dembélé	5	1	5	1	0	0	0	0	0	0	0	0
Forwards
9	FW	(Scotland) SCO	Leigh Griffiths	26	7	22	6	0	0	2	0	0	0	2	1
10	FW	(Switzerland) SUI	Albian Ajeti	30	6	20	6	1	0	2	0	2	0	5	0
22	FW	(France) FRA	Odsonne Édouard	40	22	31	18	1	0	1	0	1	1	6	3
48	FW	(Republic of Ireland) IRL	Armstrong Oko-Flex	2	0	2	0	0	0	0	0	0	0	0	0
Departures
11	FW	(Poland) POL	Patryk Klimala	24	3	17	3	1	0	0	0	1	0	5	0
21	MF	(France) FRA	Olivier Ntcham	23	1	14	1	0	0	0	0	2	0	7	0
23	DF	(Belgium) BEL	Boli Bolingoli	1	0	1	0	0	0	0	0	0	0	0	0
30	DF	(Netherlands) NED	Jeremie Frimpong	30	1	22	1	0	0	0	0	1	0	7	0
44	DF	(Israel) ISR	Hatem Abd Elhamed	15	0	8	0	1	0	0	0	2	0	4	0
52	MF	(Scotland) SCO	Ewan Henderson	3	0	2	0	0	0	0	0	0	0	1	0
53	FW	(United States) USA	Cameron Harper	1	0	1	0	0	0	0	0	0	0	0	0

Last updated: 15 May 2021
Source: Competitions

Notes

1. Player loaned out during the season
2. Player left the club during the season

=== Goalscorers ===
R	No.	Pos.	Nation	Name	Premiership	League Cup	Scottish Cup	Champions League	Europa League	Total
1	22	FW	(France)	Odsonne Édouard	18	0	0	1	3	22
2	27	MF	(Norway)	Mohamed Elyounoussi	10	0	1	2	4	17
3	14	MF	(Scotland)	David Turnbull	8	0	0	0	1	9
4	9	FW	(Scotland)	Leigh Griffiths	6	0	0	0	1	7
4	17	MF	(Scotland)	Ryan Christie	5	0	1	1	0	7
5	10	FW	(Switzerland)	Albian Ajeti	6	0	0	0	0	6
6	42	MF	(Scotland)	Callum McGregor	3	0	0	0	1	4
6	49	MF	(Scotland)	James Forrest	3	0	1	0	0	4
7	2	DF	(France)	Christopher Jullien	1	0	0	1	1	3
7	4	DF	(Republic of Ireland)	Shane Duffy	3	0	0	0	0	3
7	11	FW	(Poland)	Patryk Klimala	3	0	0	0	0	3
8	18	MF	(Australia)	Tom Rogic	1	0	0	0	1	2
8	35	DF	(Norway)	Kristoffer Ajer	2	0	0	0	0	2
9	3	DF	(Scotland)	Greg Taylor	0	0	0	1	0	1
9	6	MF	(Israel)	Nir Bitton	1	0	0	0	0	1
9	8	MF	(Scotland)	Scott Brown	1	0	0	0	0	1
9	12	MF	(Ivory Coast)	Ismaila Soro	1	0	0	0	0	1
9	21	MF	(France)	Olivier Ntcham	1	0	0	0	0	1
9	30	DF	(Netherlands)	Jeremie Frimpong	1	0	0	0	0	1
9	57	DF	(Scotland)	Stephen Welsh	1	0	0	0	0	1
9	77	MF	(England)	Karamoko Dembélé	1	0	0	0	0	1
9	93	DF	(Uruguay)	Diego Laxalt	1	0	0	0	0	1
Own goals					1	0	0	1	0	2
Total					78	0	3	7	12	100

Last updated: 15 May 2021

=== Disciplinary record ===
Includes all competitive matches. Players listed below made at least one appearance for Celtic first squad during the season.

N	P	Nat.	Name	Premiership			League Cup			Scottish Cup			Champions League			Europa League			Total			Notes
N	P	Nat.	Name	Yellow card	Second yellow card	Red card	Yellow card	Second yellow card	Red card	Yellow card	Second yellow card	Red card	Yellow card	Second yellow card	Red card	Yellow card	Second yellow card	Red card	Yellow card	Second yellow card	Red card	Notes
8	MF	(Scotland)	Brown	6		1				1			1			2			10		1	
6	MF	(Israel)	Bitton	1		1													1		1	
42	MF	(Scotland)	McGregor	5	1														5	1		
4	DF	(Republic of Ireland)	Duffy	2			1									2			5			
17	MF	(Scotland)	Christie	1												3			4			
11	FW	(Poland)	Klimala	1												2			3			
12	MF	(Ivory Coast)	Soro	2												1			3			
14	MF	(Scotland)	Turnbull	3															3			
27	MF	(Norway)	Elyounoussi	2												1			3			
93	DF	(Uruguay)	Laxalt	1												2			3			
16	DF	(England)	Kenny	2															2			
18	MF	(Australia)	Rogic	1												1			2			
21	MF	(France)	Ntcham	1												1			2			
3	DF	(Scotland)	Taylor	1															1			
10	FW	(Switzerland)	Ajeti													1			1			
22	FW	(France)	Édouard	1															1			
29	GK	(Scotland)	Bain													1			1			
30	DF	(Netherlands)	Frimpong													1			1			
35	DF	(Norway)	Ajer	1															1			
44	DF	(Israel)	Elhamed										1						1			
56	DF	(Scotland)	Ralston	1															1			
57	DF	(Scotland)	Welsh	1															1			

Last updated: 15 May 2021
Source: Competitive matches
Only competitive matches
Ordered by (red card) , (second yellow card) and (yellow card)
(yellow card) = Number of bookings; (second yellow card) = Number of sending offs after a second yellow card; (red card) = Number of sending offs by a direct red card.

=== Hat-tricks ===
Player	Against	Result	Date	Competition
(France) Odsonne Édouard	(Scotland) Hamilton Academical	5–1 (H)	2 August 2020	Premiership
(Norway) Mohamed Elyounoussi	(Scotland) Motherwell	4–1 (A)	8 November 2020	Premiership

(H) – Home; (A) – Away; (N) – Neutral

=== Clean sheets ===
As of 15 May 2021.

Rank	Name	Premiership	League Cup	Scottish Cup	Champions League	Europa League	Total	Played Games
1	(Greece) Vasilis Barkas	8	0	0	1	2	11	22
2	(Scotland) Scott Bain	7	0	1	0	0	8	23
3	(Northern Ireland) Conor Hazard	4	0	0	0	0	4	6
Total		19	0	1	1	2	23	51

=== Attendances ===
As of match played 12 May 2021

	Matches	Attendances	Average	High	Low
Premiership	19	0	0	0	0
League Cup	1	0	0	0	0
Scottish Cup	1	0	0	0	0
Champions League	2	0	0	0	0
Europa League	3	0	0	0	0
Total	26	0	0	0	0

== Team statistics ==
=== League table ===
Pos	Team	Pld	W	D	L	GF	GA	GD	Pts	Qualification or relegation (Note: Teams play each other three times (33 matches), before the league is split into two groups (the top six and the bottom six).)
1	Rangers (C)	38	32	6	0	92	13	+79	102	Qualification for the Champions League third qualifying round
2	Celtic	38	22	11	5	78	29	+49	77	Qualification for the Champions League second qualifying round
3	Hibernian	38	18	9	11	48	35	+13	63	Qualification for the Europa Conference League second qualifying round
4	Aberdeen	38	15	11	12	36	38	−2	56	Qualification for the Europa Conference League second qualifying round
5	St Johnstone	38	11	12	15	36	46	−10	45	Qualification for the Europa League third qualifying round (Note: St Johnstone qualified as the 2020–21 Scottish Cup winners.)

Rules for classification: 1) Points; 2) Goal difference; 3) Goals scored; 4) Head-to-head points; 5) Head-to-Head goal difference; 6) Play-off (only if deciding champion, UEFA competitions qualification, second stage group allocation or relegation).
(C) Champions

=== Competition overview ===
Competition	First match	Last match	Starting round	Final position	Record							
Competition	First match	Last match	Starting round	Final position	Pld	W	D	L	GF	GA	GD	Win %
Premiership	2 August 2020	15 May 2021	Matchday 1	2nd	38	22	11	5	78	29	+49	57.89
Champions League	18 August 2020	26 August 2020	1st round	2nd round	2	1	0	1	7	2	+5	50.00
Europa League	24 September 2020	10 December 2020	3rd Round	Group Stage	8	3	1	4	12	19	−7	37.50
League Cup	29 November 2020	29 November 2020	2nd round	2nd round	1	0	0	1	0	2	−2	0.00
Scottish Cup	3 April 2021	18 April 2021	3rd Round	4th Round	2	1	0	1	3	2	+1	50.00
Total					51	27	12	12	100	54	+46	52.94

Source: Competitions

=== Results by round ===
Round	1	2	3	4	5	6	7	8	9	10	11	12	13	14	15	16	17	18	19	20	21	22	23	24	25	26	27	28	29	30	31	32	33	34	35	36	37	38
Ground	H	A	A	H	A	A	H	H	A	H	A	A	A	H	H	H	A	H	A	H	H	A	H	H	A	H	A	A	H	A	H	A	H	H	A	A	H	A
Result	W	D	W	W	W	W	W	W	W	L	D	W	D	D	W	W	W	W	L	D	D	D	W	L	W	W	W	W	W	L	W	D	D	W	D	L	W	D
Position	1	4	4	3	3	2	2	2	2	2	2	2	2	2	2	2	2	2	2	2	2	2	2	2	2	2	2	2	2	2	2	2	2	2	2	2	2	2

Updated to match(es) played on 15 May 2021. Source: Competitive matches
A = Away; H = Home; W = Win; D = Draw; L = Loss

== Club ==
=== Technical staff ===
Position	Staff
Interim Manager	John Kennedy
First Team Coach	Gavin Strachan
Goalkeeping Coach	Stevie Woods
Head Physiotherapist	Tim Williamson
Head of Fitness and Conditioning	John Currie
Head of Sports Science	Jack Nayler
First Team Nutritionist	Rob Naughton

Last updated: 31 March 2021
Source: celticfc.com

=== Kit ===
Supplier: Adidas / Sponsors: Dafabet (front) and Magners (back)

On 1 July 2020, Adidas replaced New Balance as the club's official kit supplier.

Home	Away	Third	Goalkeeper 1	Goalkeeper 2	Goalkeeper 3

- Home: The home kit features the club's traditional green and white hoops, with a yellow trim. White shorts and hooped white socks complete the look.
- Away: The away kit features a mint green shirt, with a dark green trim. The shirt is accompanied by dark green shorts and hooped socks.
- Third: The third kit features a midnight black shirt, with a mint green embroidered four-leaf clover. The shirt is accompanied by black shorts and socks.

== Transfers ==
=== In ===
Pos	Player	From	Type	Window	Ends	Fee
MF	(Norway) Mohamed Elyounoussi	(England) Southampton	Loan	Summer	2021	Loan
GK	(Greece) Vasilis Barkas	(Greece) AEK Athens	Transfer	Summer	2024	£5,000,000
FW	(Switzerland) Albian Ajeti	(England) West Ham United	Transfer	Summer	2024	£5,000,000
MF	(Scotland) David Turnbull	(Scotland) Motherwell	Transfer	Summer	2024	£3,250,000
DF	(Republic of Ireland) Shane Duffy	(England) Brighton & Hove Albion	Loan	Summer	2021	Loan
DF	(Uruguay) Diego Laxalt	(Italy) AC Milan	Loan	Summer	2021	Loan
DF	(England) Jonjoe Kenny	(England) Everton	Loan	Winter	2021	Loan

=== Out ===
Pos	Player	To	Type	Window	Fee
MF	(Ivory Coast) Eboue Kouassi	(Belgium) KRC Genk	Transfer	Summer	Undisclosed
DF	(Scotland) Calvin Miller	(England) Harrogate Town	End of contract	Summer	Free
DF	(Croatia) Jozo Šimunović	Unattached	End of contract	Summer	Free
MF	(Republic of Ireland) Jonny Hayes	(Scotland) Aberdeen	End of contract	Summer	Free
MF	(Scotland) Liam Burt	(Republic of Ireland) Bohemians	End of contract	Summer	Free
FW	(Wales) Michael Sparkes	Unattached	End of contract	Summer	Free
GK	(Scotland) Craig Gordon	(Scotland) Heart of Midlothian	End of contract	Summer	Free
FW	(Scotland) Kieran McGrath	(Iceland) Grótta	Loan	Summer	Loan
MF	(Scotland) Grant Savoury	Unattached	End of contract	Summer	Free
DF	(Scotland) Jack Hendry	(Belgium) KV Oostende	Loan	Summer	Loan
GK	(Scotland) Ross Doohan	(Scotland) Ross County	Loan	Summer	Loan
DF	(Scotland) Robbie Deas	(Scotland) Inverness Caledonian Thistle	Transfer	Summer	Free
FW	(Ivory Coast) Vakoun Bayo	(France) Toulouse	Loan	Summer	Loan
MF	(Ukraine) Marian Shved	(Belgium) KV Mechelen	Loan	Summer	Loan
MF	(Scotland) Mark Hill	(Scotland) Forfar Athletic	End of contract	Summer	Free
DF	(Republic of Ireland) Lee O'Connor	(England) Tranmere Rovers	Loan	Summer	Loan
FW	(Scotland) Connor McBride	(England) Blackburn Rovers	Transfer	Summer	Free
MF	(Scotland) Scott Robertson	(England) Gillingham	Loan	Summer	Loan
DF	(Scotland) Daniel Church	(Scotland) Dumbarton	End of contract	Summer	Free
MF	(Scotland) David McKay	(Scotland) Brechin City	End of contract	Summer	Free
DF	(Belgium) Boli Bolingoli	(Turkey) İstanbul Başakşehir	Loan	Summer	Loan
MF	(Scotland) Kerr McInroy	(Scotland) Dunfermline Athletic	Loan	Summer	Loan
GK	(Scotland) Ryan Mullen	(Scotland) Cove Rangers	Loan	Summer	Loan
FW	(Republic of Ireland) Jonathan Afolabi	(Scotland) Dundee	Loan	Summer	Loan
MF	(Scotland) Brody Paterson	(Scotland) Queen's Park	Loan	Summer	Loan
MF	(Zimbabwe) Kundai Benyu	(England) Wealdstone	End of contract	Summer	Free
FW	(Scotland) Jack Aitchison	(England) Barnsley	Transfer	Summer	Undisclosed
DF	(Norway) Leo Hjelde	(Scotland) Ross County	Loan	Winter	Loan
MF	(Northern Ireland) Ben Wylie	(Northern Ireland) Ballymena United	Loan	Winter	Loan
DF	(Netherlands) Jeremie Frimpong	(Germany) Bayer Leverkusen	Transfer	Winter	£11,500,000
MF	(Republic of Ireland) Barry Coffey	(Northern Ireland) Cliftonville	Loan	Winter	Loan
MF	(Scotland) Scott Robertson	(England) Doncaster Rovers	Loan	Winter	Loan
GK	(Northern Ireland) Liam Hughes	(England) Liverpool	Transfer	Winter	Undisclosed
MF	(France) Olivier Ntcham	(France) Marseille	Loan	Winter	Loan
DF	(Israel) Hatem Abd Elhamed	(Israel) Hapoel Be'er Sheva	Transfer	Winter	Undisclosed
FW	(United States) Cameron Harper	(United States) New York Red Bulls	Transfer	Winter	Undisclosed
DF	(United States) Andrew Gutman	(United States) Atlanta United	Transfer	Winter	Undisclosed
GK	(Scotland) Ryan Mullen	(Scotland) Queen's Park	Loan	Winter	Loan
MF	(Republic of Ireland) Luca Connell	(Scotland) Queen's Park	Loan	Winter	Loan
DF	(Scotland) Ewan Otoo	(Scotland) Clyde	Loan	Winter	Loan
MF	(Scotland) Ewan Henderson	(Scotland) Dunfermline Athletic	Loan	Winter	Loan
FW	(Poland) Patryk Klimala	(United States) New York Red Bulls	Transfer	Winter	Undisclosed
GK	(Scotland) Ross Doohan	(Scotland) Dundee United	Emergency Loan		
DF	(United States) Manny Perez	(United States) Portland Timbers	Transfer	Winter	Undisclosed

== See also ==
- List of Celtic F.C. seasons
- Nine in a row
