= Giannis Konstantelias =

Greek footballer (born 2003)

Giannis Konstantelias Γιάννης Κωνσταντέλιας
- Konstantelias with PAOK in 2023

Personal information
- Full name: Ioannis Konstantelias
- Date of birth: 5 March 2003 (age 23)
- Place of birth: Volos, Greece
- Height: 1.78 m (5 ft 10 in)
- Positions: Attacking midfielder; left winger

Team information
- Current team: Borussia Dortmund
- Number: 45

Youth career
- 2013–2021: PAOK

Senior career*
Years	Team	Apps	(Gls)
2021–2026	PAOK	122	(26)
2022	→ Eupen (loan)	7	(0)
2026–	Borussia Dortmund	1	(1)

International career^{‡}
2019	Greece U16	3	(1)
2020	Greece U17	2	(1)
2021–2022	Greece U19	1	(0)
2022	Greece U21	1	(0)
2023–	Greece	18	(4)
- * Club domestic league appearances and goals as of 29 August 2026 ‡ National team caps and goals as of 27 March 2026

Giannis Konstantelias (Greek: Γιάννης Κωνσταντέλιας; born 5 March 2003) is a Greek professional footballer who plays as an attacking midfielder or left winger for Bundesliga club Borussia Dortmund and the Greece national team.

== Club career ==
=== Early career ===
Konstantelias was nine years old when he joined the academy of Agia Paraskevi in his hometown Volos. Initially, he trained with his peers, but he quickly got into the training of the older ones. In 2013 he moved to Thessaloniki for PAOK Academy where he gained valuable experiences in domestic and international tournaments and was twice named MVP. At first he played as a forward and then he moved to the center, but also to the sides.

=== PAOK ===
In 2021, Konstantelias broke in to the PAOK's first team, as on 17 January he made his first appearance with the men's team in the OFI vs PAOK game. Shortly before he turned 18 years old. In fact, he finished the season, playing in a total of three games.

On 20 January 2022, Konstantelias signed a six months' contract with Belgian Pro League club Eupen on loan from PAOK. On the same day, PAOK announced the extension of the contract with the young international until the summer of 2026.

On 30 July 2025, Konstantelias signed a contract extension with PAOK following news that a deal had been agreed with Bundesliga club VfB Stuttgart subject to a medical.

=== Borussia Dortmund ===
On 17 August 2026, Konstantelias signed a five-year contract with Bundesliga side Borussia Dortmund. Later that month, on 29 August in the Bundesliga season opener, Konstantelias was in the starting lineup and scored his first goal against Hamburger SV at the end of the first half. He was substituted off early in the second half due to a knee injury. Subsequent examinations revealed an ACL injury to his left knee, ruling him out for several months.

== International career ==
On 24 March 2023, Konstantelias made his debut for the Greece senior team in a 3–0 UEFA Euro 2024 qualifying win over Gibraltar.

On 17 November 2023, he made his first start for Greece and scored his senior international goal in a 2–0 friendly win over New Zealand.

On 23 March 2025, Konstantelias contributed on every goal scored against Scotland in the match of the 2024–25 UEFA Nations League promotion play-offs taking place in Hampden Park, scoring one and assisting fellow Greek teammates Konstantinos Karetsas and Christos Tzolis. This performance even sparked the eye of the legendary Alex Ferguson, even comparing that watching him and Karetsas play, was like watching David Beckham and Paul Scholes, both of whom were managed by Alex Ferguson in Manchester United.

== Career statistics ==
=== Club ===
As of match played 29 August 2026

Appearances and goals by club, season and competition
Club	Season	League			National cup (Note: Includes Greek Cup, Belgian Cup)		Continental		Other		Total	
Club	Season	Division	Apps	Goals	Apps	Goals	Apps	Goals	Apps	Goals	Apps	Goals
PAOK	2020–21	Super League Greece	3	0	—		—		—		3	0
PAOK	2021–22	Super League Greece	2	0	—		2 (Note: Appearance(s) in UEFA Europa Conference League)	0	—		4	0
PAOK	2022–23	Super League Greece	30	2	6	1	1	0	—		37	3
PAOK	2023–24	Super League Greece	34	9	5	2	16	3	—		55	14
PAOK	2024–25	Super League Greece	29	7	3	0	15 (Note: Four appearances in UEFA Champions League, ten appearances and three goals in UEFA Europa League)	3	—		47	10
PAOK	2025–26	Super League Greece	24	8	4	3	11 (Note: Appearances in UEFA Europa League)	3	—		40	14
PAOK	2026–27	Super League Greece	0	0	0	0	2	3	—		2	3
PAOK	Total		122	26	19	6	47	12	—		188	44
Eupen (loan)	2021–22	Belgian Pro League	7	0	1	0	—		—		8	0
Borussia Dortmund	2026–27	Bundesliga	1	1	0	0	0	0	1 (Note: Appearance in Franz Beckenbauer Supercup)	0	2	1
Career total			130	27	20	6	47	12	1	0	198	45

=== International ===
As of match played 27 March 2026

Appearances and goals by national team and year
National team	Year	Apps	Goals
Greece	2023	4	1
Greece	2024	5	0
Greece	2025	8	3
Greece	2026	1	0
Total		18	4

As of match played 11 June 2025

Scores and results list Greece's goal tally first, score column indicates score after each Konstantelias goal.

List of international goals scored by Giannis Konstantelias
No.	Date	Venue	Opponent	Score	Result	Competition
1	17 November 2023	Georgios Kamaras Stadium, Athens, Greece	New Zealand	1–0	2–0	Friendly
2	23 March 2025	Hampden Park, Glasgow, Scotland	Scotland	1–0	3–0	2024–25 UEFA Nations League promotion/relegation play-offs
3	7 June 2025	Pankritio Stadium, Heraklion, Greece	Slovakia	1–0	4–1	Friendly
4	11 June 2025	Pankritio Stadium, Heraklion, Greece	Bulgaria	4–0	4–0	Friendly

== Honours ==
PAOK

- Super League Greece: 2023–24
- Greek Cup: 2020–21

Individual

- PAOK Player of the Season: 2022–23
- Super League Greece PAOK Player of the Year: 2022–23
- Super League Greece Young Player of the Season: 2022–23, 2023–24
- Super League Greece Team of the Season: 2022–23, 2023–24, 2024–25
- Super League Greece Player of the Month: March 2025, October 2025
- Super League Greece Greek Footballer of the Season: 2024–25
- Super League Greece Best Goal: 2025–26 Matchday 10
- PAOK record transfer sale: €26m (plus 6m bonus target), moving to Borussia Dortmund
