= Jonjoe Kenny =

English footballer (born 1997)

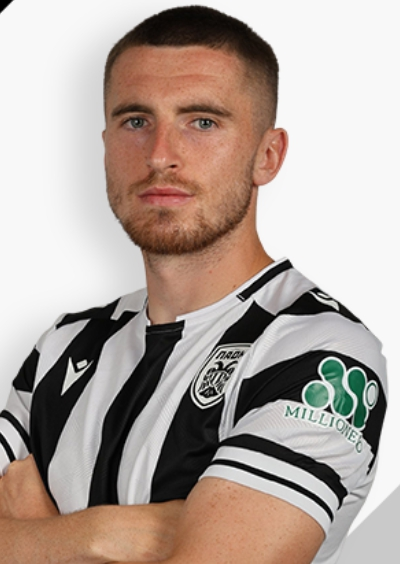
- Kenny with PAOK FC in 2025

Personal information
- Full name: Jonjoe Kenny
- Date of birth: 15 March 1997 (age 29)
- Place of birth: Liverpool, England
- Height: 5 ft 9 in (1.76 m)
- Position: Right-back

Team information
- Current team: PAOK
- Number: 3

Youth career
- 2006–2014: Everton

Senior career*
Years	Team	Apps	(Gls)
2014–2022	Everton	50	(0)
2015	→ Wigan Athletic (loan)	7	(0)
2016	→ Oxford United (loan)	17	(0)
2019–2020	→ Schalke 04 (loan)	31	(2)
2021	→ Celtic (loan)	14	(0)
2022–2025	Hertha BSC	90	(4)
2025–	PAOK	28	(0)

International career
2012–2013	England U16	3	(0)
2013–2014	England U17	10	(1)
2014–2015	England U18	3	(0)
2015–2016	England U19	10	(0)
2016–2017	England U20	14	(0)
2017–2019	England U21	16	(1)
- * Club domestic league appearances and goals as of 23:00, 20 September 2026 (UTC)

Jonjoe Kenny (born 15 March 1997) is an English professional footballer who plays as a right-back for Super League Greece club PAOK.

Kenny came through the youth academy system of Everton, where he had been a professional since July 2014. He made his debut for the club in 2016, and went on to earn 68 appearances for Everton, as his time with the club was widely spent on loans out. After departing the club in 2022, he joined Hertha BSC.

== Club career ==
=== Everton and loans out ===
A youth graduate of the Everton academy, Kenny signed his first professional deal with the first-team in July 2014. A year later on 21 July 2015, he signed on loan for League One side Wigan Athletic. Having played seven times for the first team, he returned to Everton at the end of the loan, despite Wigan manager Gary Caldwell expressing a desire to extend the deal. On 27 January 2016, Kenny joined Oxford United of League Two, initially on a one-month loan, later extended to the end of the season.

He made his Premier League debut for Everton, coming on as a substitute for fellow academy graduate Matthew Pennington against Norwich City, on 15 May 2016. His second Premier League appearance was again as a substitute, for Mason Holgate against Swansea City on 6 May 2017.

Kenny began the 2017–18 season as fourth choice under Ronald Koeman, however soon impressed when given his chance. He made his first Premier League start on 22 October at home to Arsenal in a 5–2 defeat. Following Koeman's sacking, he made 13 consecutive starts in the league, playing in 16 out of 19 games from October until the return of fellow right-back Séamus Coleman in January. He played 25 games in all competitions.

The following season began with Kenny as back up to Coleman, before impressing as the Irishman suffered with a foot injury. He played four Premier League games in a row. Following the win away to Leicester City on 6 October, he was dropped out of the starting lineup and didn't play again until New Year's Day, again against Leicester, this time in a 1–0 defeat. He kept his place for an FA Cup third round win over Lincoln City. He returned to the starting eleven on 28 January in a 1–0 victory over Huddersfield Town, coming on as a makeshift left-back for the final 20 minutes, following an injury to Leighton Baines and a red card for his backup Lucas Digne. He continued at left-back against Wolves four days later, coming on for Baines on the 20th minute. After impressing, he played the following two matches against Manchester City and Watford, in which he picked up the Man of the Match award.

In June 2019, Kenny signed for German Bundesliga side Schalke on a season-long loan. He scored for Die Knappen on his third Bundesliga appearance and was awarded the August 2019 Rookie of the Month award. He made 31 league appearance in the 2019–20 season, scoring twice, before returning to Everton at the end of the season following the end of his contract.

Kenny only made eight appearances for Everton in 2020–21 before again going out on loan, joining Scottish Premiership side Celtic in February 2021 until the end of the season.

In May 2022, despite the club offering Kenny a new contract, he opted to leave Everton upon the expiration of his contract. On 14 June, he was officially released from his contract, joining Hertha BSC on a free transfer.

=== Hertha BSC ===
Kenny then returned to Germany, signing for Bundesliga side Hertha BSC through the 2024–25 season. He later left the club at the end of the 2024–25 season.

=== PAOK ===
On 20 June 2025, Kenny joined Super League side PAOK on a free transfer, signing a contract until 2028.

== International career ==
In May 2014, Kenny was part of the England under-17 side that won the 2014 UEFA European Under-17 Championship. In the final, Kenny converted the match-winning penalty in the penalty shoot-out against the Netherlands. He was named in UEFA's team of the tournament.

Kenny was a member of the England squad for the 2016 UEFA European Under-19 Championship, starting in the semi-final defeat against Italy.

Kenny was selected for the England under-20 team in the 2017 FIFA U-20 World Cup. He played in all seven matches of the tournament. In the final England beat Venezuela 1–0, which is England's first win in a global tournament since their World Cup victory of 1966.

In May 2019, Kenny was named in the England Under-21 squad for the UEFA European U-21 Championship in Italy and San Marino. Kenny was among three Everton players that were named as Dominic Calvert-Lewin and Kieran Dowell were also included in the 23-man squad. Kenny scored a stunning strike and England's third during a 3–3 draw with Croatia at the San Marino Stadium on 24 June 2019.

Kenny is eligible to represent the Republic of Ireland under FIFA's grandparent rule.

== Career statistics ==
As of match played 13 August 2026

Appearances and goals by club, season and competition
Club	Season	League			National cup (Note: Includes FA Cup, Scottish Cup, DFB-Pokal, Greek Football Cup)		League cup (Note: Includes EFL Cup)		Europe		Other		Total	
Club	Season	Division	Apps	Goals	Apps	Goals	Apps	Goals	Apps	Goals	Apps	Goals	Apps	Goals
Everton	2015–16	Premier League	1	0	0	0	0	0	—		—		1	0
Everton	2016–17	Premier League	1	0	0	0	0	0	—		—		1	0
Everton	2017–18	Premier League	19	0	1	0	2	0	3 (Note: Appearances in UEFA Europa League)	0	—		25	0
Everton	2018–19	Premier League	10	0	1	0	2	0	—		—		13	0
Everton	2019–20	Premier League	0	0	0	0	0	0	—		—		0	0
Everton	2020–21	Premier League	4	0	1	0	3	0	—		—		8	0
Everton	2021–22	Premier League	15	0	4	0	2	0	—		—		21	0
Everton	Total		50	0	6	0	8	0	3	0	—		68	0
Wigan Athletic (loan)	2015–16	League One	7	0	0	0	0	0	—		0	0	7	0
Oxford United (loan)	2015–16	League Two	17	0	1	0	0	0	—		2 (Note: Appearances in Football League Trophy)	0	20	0
Schalke 04 (loan)	2019–20	Bundesliga	31	2	3	0	—		—		—		34	2
Celtic (loan)	2020–21	Scottish Premiership	14	0	2	0	0	0	0	0	—		16	0
Hertha BSC	2022–23	Bundesliga	29	0	1	0	—		—		—		30	0
Hertha BSC	2023–24	2. Bundesliga	29	3	4	1	—		—		—		33	4
Hertha BSC	2024–25	2. Bundesliga	32	1	3	0	—		—		—		35	1
Hertha BSC	Total		90	4	8	1	—		—		—		98	5
PAOK	2025–26	Super League Greece	23	0	8	0	—		13	0	—		44	0
PAOK	2026–27	Super League Greece	0	0	0	0	—		4	0	—		4	0
PAOK	Total		23	0	8	0	—		17	0	—		48	0
Career total			229	6	27	1	8	0	20	0	2	0	286	7

== Honours ==
Oxford United

- Football League Two runner-up: 2015–16
- Football League Trophy runner-up: 2015–16

England U17

- UEFA European Under-17 Championship: 2014

England U20

- FIFA U-20 World Cup: 2017

England U21

- Toulon Tournament: 2018

Individual

- UEFA European Under-17 Championship Team of the Tournament: 2014
- Bundesliga Rookie of the Month: August 2019
