= Anestis Mythou =

Greek footballer (born 2002)

Personal information
- Date of birth: 22 May 2007 (age 19)
- Place of birth: Thessaloniki, Greece
- Height: 1.88 m (6 ft 2 in)
- Position: Forward

Team information
- Current team: PAOK
- Number: 56

Youth career
- Protathlites Pefkon
- 2017–2024: PAOK

Senior career*
Years	Team	Apps	(Gls)
2024–2025	PAOK B	9	(1)
2025–	PAOK	13	(4)

International career^{‡}
2023	Greece U16	3	(1)
2023–2024	Greece U17	11	(1)
2024–	Greece U19	15	(8)
2026–	Greece U21	1	(0)
- * Club domestic league appearances and goals as of 13 September 2026 ‡ National team caps and goals as of 28 June 2026

Anestis Mythou (Greek: Ανέστης Μύθου; born 22 May 2007) is a Greek professional footballer who plays as a forward for Super League Greece club PAOK.

== Club career ==
Mythou is a product of the youth academies of the Greek clubs Protathlites Pefkon and PAOK. He was promoted to PAOK B in the 2024–25 season. On 30 June 2025, he extended his contract with PAOK until 2028. On 7 August 2025, he made his senior debut with PAOK in a 0–0 UEFA Europa League tie with Wolfsberger AC.

== International career ==
Mythou is a youth international for Greece. He was called up to the Greece U19s for a set of 2026 UEFA European Under-19 Championship qualification matches in November 2025.

== Personal life ==
Mythou's father, Dimitris Mythou, was a professional basketball player in Greece.

== Career statistics ==
As of match played 26 March 2026

Appearances and goals by club, season and competition
Club	Season	League			Greek Cup		Europe		Total	
Club	Season	Division	Apps	Goals	Apps	Goals	Apps	Goals	Apps	Goals
PAOK	2025–26	Super League Greece	7	1	7	3	6 (Note: Appearances in UEFA Europa League)	1	20	5
Career total			7	1	7	3	6	1	20	5
