= Alessandro Vogliacco =

Italian footballer (born 1998)

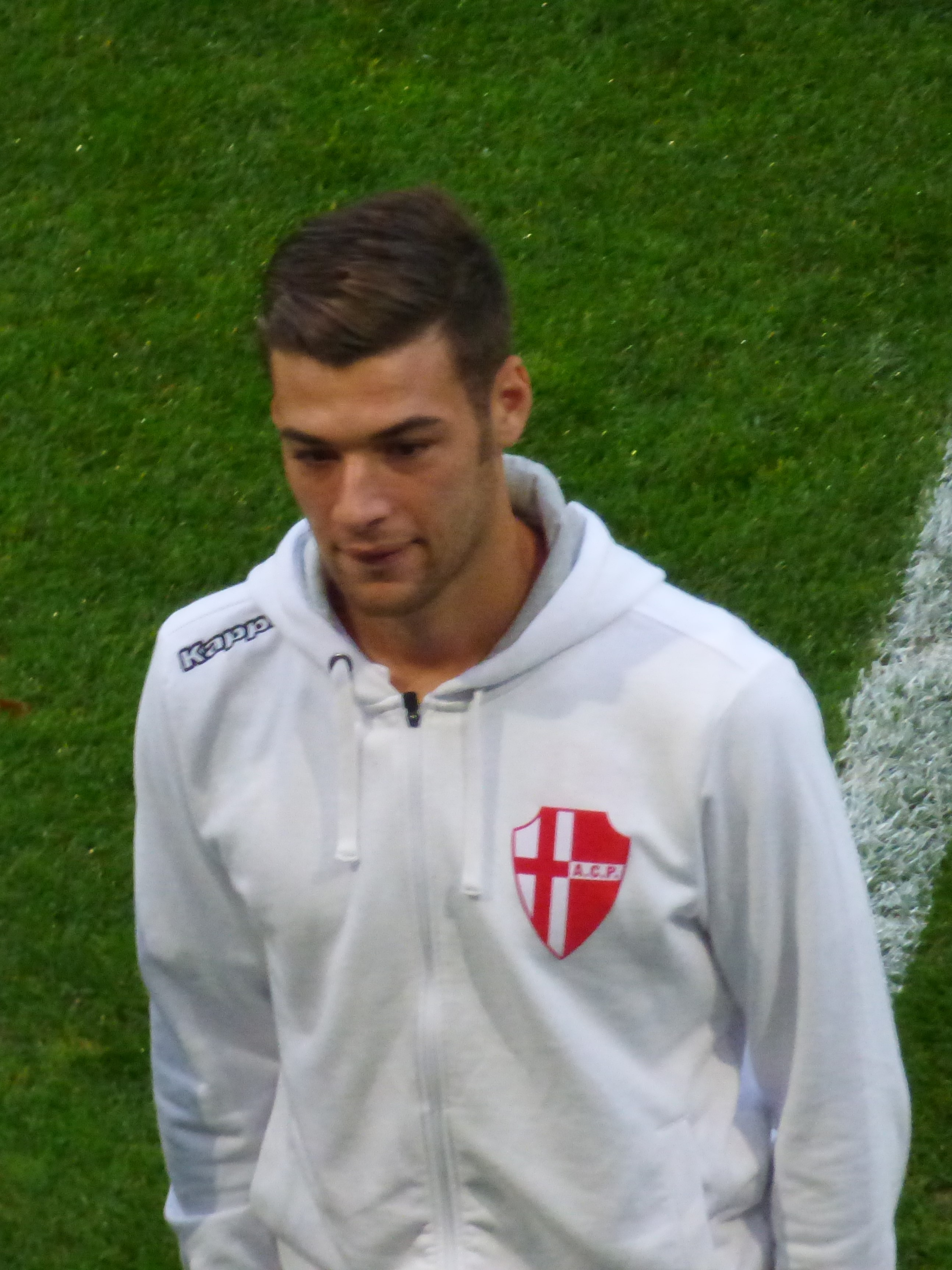
- Vogliacco with Padova in 2018

Personal information
- Date of birth: 14 September 1998 (age 28)
- Place of birth: Acquaviva delle Fonti, Italy
- Height: 1.86 m (6 ft 1 in)
- Position: Centre-back

Team information
- Current team: Cremonese
- Number: 38

Youth career
- –2014: Bari
- 2013–2014: → Juventus
- 2014–2018: Juventus

Senior career*
Years	Team	Apps	(Gls)
2018–2019	Juventus	0	(0)
2018–2019	→ Padova (loan)	1	(0)
2019	→ Pordenone (loan)	7	(0)
2019–2021	Pordenone	51	(0)
2021–2026	Genoa	57	(2)
2021–2022	→ Benevento (loan)	28	(0)
2024–2025	→ Parma (loan)	10	(0)
2025–2026	→ PAOK (loan)	8	(1)
2026–	Cremonese	1	(0)

International career^{‡}
2013	Italy U15	2	(0)
2013	Italy U16	3	(0)
2014–2015	Italy U17	5	(0)
2015	Italy U18	1	(0)
2016–2017	Italy U19	12	(0)
2017–2018	Italy U20	3	(0)
2020–2021	Italy U21	3	(0)
- * Club domestic league appearances and goals as of 22 August 2026 ‡ National team caps and goals as of 19:41, 18 November 2020 (UTC)

Alessandro Vogliacco (born 14 September 1998) is an Italian professional footballer who plays as a centre-back for Serie B club Cremonese.

== Club career ==
=== Juventus ===
Vogliacco began to represent the Under-19 squad of Juventus in the 2015–16 season.

==== Loan to Padova ====
On 17 August 2018, he joined Serie B club Padova on a season-long loan.

He made his Serie B debut for Padova on 24 November 2018 in a game against Carpi, as a 69th-minute substitute for Luca Ravanelli. That was the only league game he played for Padova.

==== Loan to Pordenone ====
On 21 January 2019, he was loaned to Serie C club Pordenone.

=== Pordenone ===
On 24 July 2019, he moved to Pordenone (which was promoted to Serie B) on a permanent basis, signing a 3-year contract.

=== Genoa ===
==== Loan to Benevento ====
On 13 August 2021, he signed with Genoa and was immediately loaned to Benevento.

==== Loan to Parma ====
On 14 January 2025, Vogliacco moved on loan to Parma, with an option to buy.

== International career ==
He was first called up to represent his country in June 2013, for Italy national under-15 football team friendlies. He represented Italy in every subsequent age bracket up to Under-20 team.

On 13 October 2020, he made his debut with the Italy U21 playing as a starter in a qualifying match won 2–0 against Republic of Ireland in Pisa.

== Personal life ==
Vogliacco has daughter Violante born in 2021 and son Siniša Leone born in 2024, with his partner Virginia Mihajlović, daughter of Siniša Mihajlović.

== Career statistics ==
=== Club ===
As of 9 February 2026

Appearances and goals by club, season and competition
Club	Season	League			National cup (Note: Includes Coppa Italia, Greek Cup)		Continental		Other		Total	
Club	Season	Division	Apps	Goals	Apps	Goals	Apps	Goals	Apps	Goals	Apps	Goals
Padova (loan)	2018–19	Serie B	1	0	—		—		—		1	0
Pordenone (loan)	2018–19	Serie C	7	0	—		—		—		7	0
Pordenone	2019–20	Serie B	18	0	0	0	—		2 (Note: Appearances in Serie B Playoffs)	0	20	0
Pordenone	2020–21	Serie B	31	0	1	0	—		—		32	0
Pordenone	Total		49	0	1	0	—		2	0	52	0
Genoa	2022–2023	Serie B	25	0	2	0	—		—		27	0
Genoa	2023–2024	Serie A	20	0	3	0	—		—		23	0
Genoa	2024–2025	Serie A	12	2	2	0	—		—		14	2
Genoa	Total		57	2	7	0	—		—		64	2
Benevento (loan)	2021–2022	Serie B	27	0	2	0	—		1	0	30	0
Parma (loan)	2024–2025	Serie A	10	0	—		—		—		10	0
PAOK (loan)	2025–2026	Super League Greece	7	1	2	0	3 (Note: Appearances in UEFA Europa League)	1	—		12	2
Career total			158	3	12	0	3	1	3	0	176	4

== Honours ==
Pordenone

- Serie C: 2018–19 (group B)
- Supercoppa di Serie C: 2019
