= Antonis Tsiftsis =

Greek footballer

Personal information
- Full name: Antonios Tsiftsis
- Date of birth: 21 July 1999 (age 27)
- Place of birth: Giannitsa, Greece
- Height: 1.91 m (6 ft 3 in)
- Position: Goalkeeper

Team information
- Current team: PAOK
- Number: 99

Youth career
- Asteras Tripolis

Senior career*
Years	Team	Apps	(Gls)
2017–2024	Asteras Tripolis	53	(0)
2023–2024	→ Raków Częstochowa (loan)	1	(0)
2024–	PAOK	18	(0)

International career^{‡}
2015	Greece U17	1	(0)
2017	Greece U18	3	(0)
2026–	Greece	1	(0)
- * Club domestic league appearances and goals as of 20 September 2026 ‡ National team caps and goals as of 31 March 2026

Antonis Tsiftsis (Greek: Αντώνης Τσιφτσής; born 21 July 1999) is a Greek professional footballer who plays as a goalkeeper for Super League Greece club PAOK and the Greece national team.

== Career ==
=== Asteras Tripolis ===
Tsiftsis made his debut in a 4–0 home triumph against Platanias on 2 April 2018.

On 13 May 2019, he signed a new contract, running until the summer of 2022.

In the 2020–21 season, Tsiftsis made 18 appearances across all competitions and on 26 April 2021 signed a new four-year contract, which will keep him tied to the club until 2025.

==== Loan to Raków Częstochowa ====
On 9 July 2023, Tsiftsis moved to Polish champions Raków Częstochowa on a season-long loan, with an option to make the move permanent.

== Career statistics ==
As of match played 6 April 2026

Appearances and goals by club, season and competition
Club	Season	League			National cup (Note: Includes Greek Cup)		Europe		Other		Total	
Club	Season	Division	Apps	Goals	Apps	Goals	Apps	Goals	Apps	Goals	Apps	Goals
Asteras Tripolis	2017–18	Super League Greece	1	0	0	0	—		—		1	0
Asteras Tripolis	2018–19	Super League Greece	0	0	0	0	—		—		0	0
Asteras Tripolis	2019–20	Super League Greece	2	0	0	0	—		—		2	0
Asteras Tripolis	2020–21	Super League Greece	16	0	1	0	—		—		17	0
Asteras Tripolis	2021–22	Super League Greece	18	0	0	0	—		—		18	0
Asteras Tripolis	2022–23	Super League Greece	7	0	0	0	—		—		7	0
Asteras Tripolis	2023–24	Super League Greece	9	0	0	0	—		—		9	0
Asteras Tripolis	Total		53	0	1	0	0	0	—		54	0
Raków Częstochowa (loan)	2023–24	Ekstraklasa	1	0	0	0	0	0	0	0	1	0
Raków Częstochowa II (loan)	2023–24	III liga, group III	2	0	—		—		—		2	0
PAOK	2024–25	Super League Greece	2	0	0	0	0	0	—		2	0
PAOK	2025–26	Super League Greece	14	0	6	0	6	0	—		26	0
PAOK	Total		16	0	6	0	6	0	0	0	28	0
Career total			72	0	7	0	6	0	0	0	85	0
