= Dimitrios Monastirlis =

Greek footballer

Dimitris Monastirlis
Personal information
- Full name: Dimitrios Monastirlis
- Date of birth: 22 March 2004 (age 22)
- Place of birth: Thessaloniki, Greece
- Height: 1.92 m (6 ft 4 in)
- Position: Goalkeeper

Team information
- Current team: PAOK
- Number: 41

Youth career
- 2013–2022: PAOK

Senior career*
Years	Team	Apps	(Gls)
2022–	PAOK B	33	(0)
2024–	PAOK	1	(0)

International career^{‡}
2022–2023	Greece U19	8	(0)
2024–	Greece U21	4	(0)
- * Club domestic league appearances and goals as of 12 October 2026 ‡ National team caps and goals as of 6 October 2026

Dimitrios Monastirlis (Greek: Δημήτριος Μοναστηρλής; born 22 March 2004) is a Greek professional footballer who plays as a goalkeeper Greek Super League 1 club PAOK.
