= Giannis Michailidis =

Greek footballer

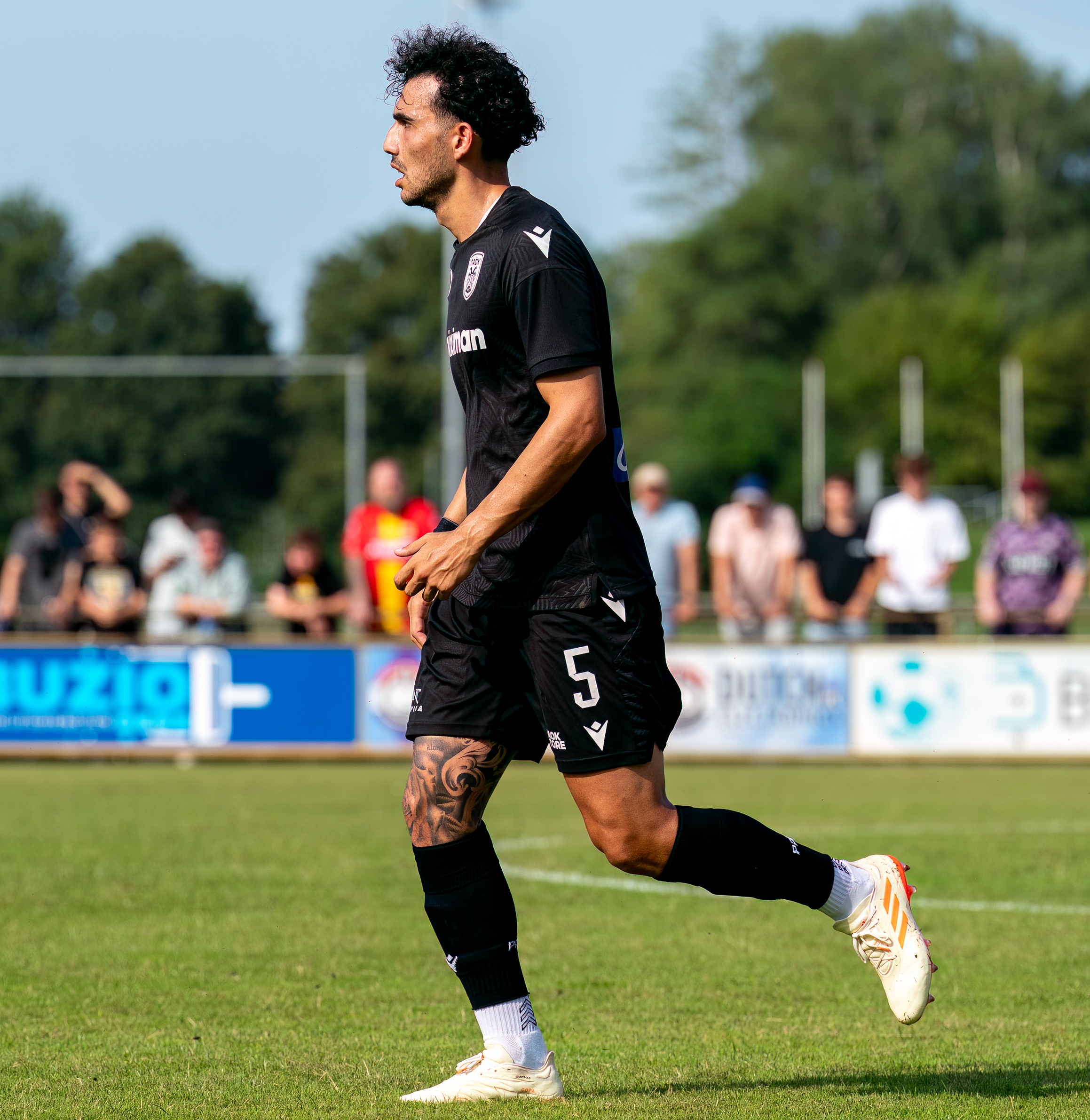
- Michailidis in 2023

Personal information
- Full name: Ioannis Michailidis
- Date of birth: 18 February 2000 (age 26)
- Place of birth: Giannitsa, Greece
- Height: 1.88 m (6 ft 2 in)
- Position: Centre-back

Team information
- Current team: PAOK
- Number: 5

Youth career
- 2014–2016: Giannitsa
- 2016–2020: PAOK

Senior career*
Years	Team	Apps	(Gls)
2019–	PAOK	100	(7)
2022–2023	PAOK B	10	(2)

International career^{‡}
2017	Greece U17	7	(0)
2018	Greece U18	3	(0)
2018–2019	Greece U19	6	(0)
2021	Greece U21	6	(0)
2020–	Greece	5	(0)
- * Club domestic league appearances and goals as of 20 September 2026 ‡ National team caps and goals as of 2 October 2026

Giannis Michailidis (Greek: Γιάννης Μιχαηλίδης; born 18 February 2000) is a Greek professional footballer who plays as a centre-back for Super League Greece club PAOK and the Greece national team.

== Club career ==
=== Early career ===
Born on February 18, 2000, he became a member of the Giannitsa Sports Academy, moving through all the age level groups until he was 16, when he joined PAOK. Relatively “old” for the PAOK Academy at that stage, he showed impressively good prospects for PAOK not to try and exploit them. From Giannitsa to Thessaloniki then, and from his family home to PAOK Academy house. The transition was difficult at first, as he admitted, mainly due to the intensive training and attending school at the same time. However, this did not affect his performance on the pitch at all. Up until that point, Michailidis played as a defensive mid elder, but he immediately made his presence felt in the defensive line of the Under-17s. A stopper with impressive physical characteristics, being tall and strong, he is also nimble, smart, and fast. A left-footer, Michailidis is also talented with the ball at his feet, standing out for his accurate long passes and the maturity he shows in his game. With full seasons, first for the Under-17s and then for the Under-19s, he celebrated three consecutive league championships (seasons 2017–18, 2018–19, and 2019–20), and was part of a group of players who went an astonishing series of 70 games without defeat, while he also played in the UEFA Youth League. Having represented Greece at youth level, he was also called up to the full Greece senior squad in August 2020 for the UEFA Nations League matches. With full seasons with PAOK, first in U-17 and then in U-19, he celebrated with his teammates three consecutive championships and an incredible series of 70 games without defeat, while he also wore the team jersey at UEFA Youth League.

=== PAOK ===
In March 2019, he was promoted to the first team of PAOK and start playing in the last matches of the 2019–20 playoffs, while he scored his first goal against OFI on 4 July 2020, in an away draw 2–2.

In March 2022, Michailidis left the match between PAOK and PAS Giannina injured and the examinations he submitted confirmed the fears of the people of Dikefalos, as the results showed that he suffered a total rupture of the anterior cruciate ligament, a rupture through the meniscus and a second-degree ligament injury. Giannis Michailidis traveled on Sunday (3/4) in the morning to Portugal where on Monday (4/4) he will undergo the necessary surgery to overcome his serious knee injury. The young defender of Dikefalos will do there the first stage of his recovery and is expected to return to Greece.

== International career ==
As a result of his performance, he was a member of both Greece U-17 and Greece U-19 and was also called up to the Greece in August 2020 for the upcoming UEFA Nations League game. He made his national team debut on 7 October 2020, in a friendly against Austria.

== Career statistics ==
As of match played 10 April 2025

Club	Season	League			Greek Cup		Continental		Total	
Club	Season	Division	Apps	Goals	Apps	Goals	Apps	Goals	Apps	Goals
PAOK	2019–20	Super League Greece	7	1	2	0	—		9	1
PAOK	2020–21	Super League Greece	19	0	3	0	5 (Note: Four appearances in UEFA Champions League, one appearance in UEFA Europa League)	0	27	0
PAOK	2021–22	Super League Greece	19	2	1	0	6 (Note: Appearances in UEFA Europa Conference League)	0	26	2
PAOK	2023–24	Super League Greece	12	1	5	0	3	0	20	1
PAOK	2024–25	Super League Greece	13	1	3	0	8	0	24	1
PAOK	Total		70	5	14	0	22	0	106	5
PAOK B	2022–23	Super League Greece 2	10	2	—		—		10	2
Career total			60	5	14	0	22	0	116	7

== Honours ==
PAOK

- Super League Greece: 2023–24
- Greek Cup: 2020–21

Individual

- Super League Greece Team of the Season: 2024–25
