= Dimitris Chatsidis =

Greek footballer (born 2006)

Personal information
- Full name: Dimitrios Chatsidis
- Date of birth: 14 June 2006 (age 20)
- Place of birth: Kozani, Greece
- Height: 1.84 m (6 ft 0 in)
- Position: Winger

Team information
- Current team: PAOK
- Number: 52

Youth career
- 2013–2024: PAOK

Senior career*
Years	Team	Apps	(Gls)
2024–2025	PAOK B	15	(1)
2025–	PAOK	16	(3)

International career^{‡}
2024–2025	Greece U19	5	(3)
2025–	Greece U21	2	(0)
- * Club domestic league appearances and goals as of 13 September 2026 ‡ National team caps and goals as of 28 June 2026

Dimitris Chatsidis (Greek: Δημήτρης Χατσίδης; born 14 June 2006) is a Greek professional footballer who plays as a winger for Super League Greece club PAOK.

== Club career ==
Born in Kozani of Romani origin, Chatsidis joined the PAOK Academy in 2013, aged 7. On 14 August 2025, Chatsidis made his PAOK debut, in the 1–0 (a.e.t.) away win against Wolfsberger AC for the UEFA Europa League. On 11 February 2026, he scored his first goal in the 2–0 Greek Cup semi-final win against Panathinaikos.

== International career ==
Chatsidis is a youth international for Greece.
