= List of Greek football transfers summer 2024 =

This is a list of Greek football transfers summer 2024.

== Greek Super League ==
=== PAOK ===
In:

No.	Pos.	Nation	Player
2	MF	GUI	Mady Camara (from Olympiacos)
9	FW	RUS	Fedor Chalov (from (Russia) CSKA Moscow)
16	DF	POL	Tomasz Kędziora (from (Ukraine) Dynamo Kyiv, previously on loan)
18	DF	USA	Jonathan Gómez (from (Spain) Real Sociedad B)
25	DF	GRE	Konstantinos Thymianis (from Panserraikos)
34	FW	MAR	Tarik Tissoudali (from (Belgium) Gent)
47	MF	ENG	Shola Shoretire (from (England) Manchester United)
99	GK	GRE	Antonis Tsiftsis (from Asteras Tripolis)

Out:

No.	Pos.	Nation	Player
4	DF	GRE	Konstantinos Koulierakis (to (Germany) VfL Wolfsburg)
15	DF	NGR	William Troost-Ekong (to (Saudi Arabia) Al-Kholood)
18	GK	SRB	Živko Živković (to (Cyprus) Anorthosis)
50	MF	POR	Filipe Soares (on loan to (Portugal) Farense, previously on loan at (Portugal) Famalicão)
88	MF	BRA	Marcos Antônio (loan return to (Italy) Lazio, later on loan to (Brazil) São Paulo)
95	FW	GRE	Stefanos Tzimas (on loan to (Germany) 1. FC Nürnberg)

=== AEK Athens ===
In:

No.	Pos.	Nation	Player
1	GK	ALB	Thomas Strakosha (from (England) Brentford)
9	FW	ARG	Erik Lamela (from (Spain) Sevilla)
11	FW	MTN	Aboubakary Koïta (from (Belgium) STVV)
16	FW	GRE	Sotiris Tsiloulis (from Lamia)
18	DF	PER	Alexander Callens (from (Spain) Girona, previously on loan)
29	DF	ENG	Moses Odubajo (from Aris)
37	MF	ARG	Roberto Pereyra (from (Italy) Udinese)
91	GK	ITA	Alberto Brignoli (from Panathinaikos)

Out:

No.	Pos.	Nation	Player
9	FW	NED	Tom van Weert (to Atromitos)
11	FW	ARG	Sergio Araujo (released)
14	FW	ARG	Ezequiel Ponce (to (United States) Houston Dynamo)
27	DF	BIH	Vedad Radonja (on loan to Lamia)
29	DF	FRA	Djibril Sidibé (to (France) Toulouse)
30	GK	GRE	Georgios Athanasiadis (to (Cyprus) AEK Larnaca)
35	FW	GRE	Michalis Kosidis (on loan to (Poland) Puszcza Niepołomice)
55	DF	GRE	Konstantinos Chrysopoulos (on loan to (Cyprus) Anorthosis)
—	DF	UKR	Oleh Danchenko (retired, previously on loan at (Ukraine) Zorya Luhansk)

=== Olympiacos ===
In:

No.	Pos.	Nation	Player
5	DF	ITA	Lorenzo Pirola (from (Italy) Salernitana)
8	MF	NZL	Marko Stamenić (on loan from (England) Nottingham Forest)
11	MF	NOR	Kristoffer Velde (from (Poland) Lech Poznań)
14	MF	ESP	Dani García (from (Spain) Athletic Bilbao)
16	DF	ANG	David Carmo (on loan from (England) Nottingham Forest)
17	FW	UKR	Roman Yaremchuk (from (Belgium) Club Brugge)
20	DF	POR	Costinha (from (Portugal) Rio Ave)
99	GK	GRE	Alexandros Anagnostopoulos (from A.E. Kifisia)

Out:

No.	Pos.	Nation	Player
4	MF	GUI	Mady Camara (to PAOK)
6	DF	ENG	Nelson Abbey (on loan to (England) Swansea City)
7	MF	GRE	Kostas Fortounis (released)
8	MF	ESP	Vicente Iborra (to (Spain) Levante)
11	FW	MAR	Youssef El-Arabi (to (Cyprus) APOEL)
15	MF	GRE	Sotiris Alexandropoulos (loan return to (Portugal) Sporting CP, later on loan to (Belgium) Standard Liège)
16	DF	ANG	David Carmo (loan return to (Portugal) Porto, later to (England) Nottingham Forest)
18	DF	ESP	Quini (to Atromitos)
20	MF	POR	João Carvalho (to (Portugal) Estoril)
27	DF	ENG	Omar Richards (loan return to (England) Nottingham Forest, later on loan to (Portugal) Rio Ave)
55	MF	GRE	Christos Liatsos (on loan to PAE Chania)
77	FW	CRO	Ivan Brnić (on loan to (Slovenia) NK Celje)
99	GK	GRE	Athanasios Papadoudis (to (Cyprus) Pafos)
—	DF	SEN	Ousseynou Ba (to (Turkey) İstanbul Başakşehir, previously on loan)
—	DF	ISR	Doron Leidner (on loan to (Switzerland) FC Zürich)
—	MF	ESP	Pep Biel (on loan to (United States) Charlotte FC), previously on loan at (Germany) FC Augsburg
—	FW	ARG	Maximiliano Lovera (to (Argentina) Rosario Central, previously on loan)
—	FW	GRE	Marios Vrousai (to (Portugal) Rio Ave, previously on loan)
—	MF	POR	Pêpê (to (Cyprus) Pafos, previously on loan)
—	MF	SCO	Jordan Holsgrove (to (Portugal) Estoril, previously on loan)
—	DF	GRE	Fotis Kitsos (to (Cyprus) Omonia, previously on loan at Volos)
—	FW	GUI	Algassime Bah (to (Cyprus) APOEL)
—	GK	ALB	Anxhelo Sina (on loan to (Portugal) Rio Ave)
—	DF	GRE	Konstantinos Kostoulas (on loan to (Portugal) Rio Ave B)

=== Panathinaikos ===
In:

No.	Pos.	Nation	Player
3	DF	GER	Philipp Max (from (Germany) Eintracht Frankfurt)
10	MF	BRA	Tetê (from (Turkey) Galatasaray)
15	DF	ISL	Sverrir Ingi Ingason (from (Denmark) Midtjylland)
20	MF	SRB	Nemanja Maksimović (from (Spain) Getafe)
21	DF	CRO	Tin Jedvaj (from (Russia) Lokomotiv Moscow, previously on loan)
28	MF	URU	Facundo Pellistri (from (England) Manchester United)
32	DF	GRE	George Baldock (from (England) Sheffield United)
69	GK	POL	Bartłomiej Drągowski (from (Italy) Spezia, previously on loan)

Out:

No.	Pos.	Nation	Player
3	DF	ESP	Juankar (released)
10	MF	BRA	Bernard (to (Brazil) Atlético Mineiro)
15	GK	GRE	Vasilios Xenopoulos (to Kifisia)
34	MF	ARG	Sebastián Palacios (to (Argentina) Talleres)
91	GK	ITA	Alberto Brignoli (to AEK Athens)
—	DF	GRE	Konstantinos Lampsias (on loan to PAS Giannina)

=== Aris ===
In:

No.	Pos.	Nation	Player

Out:

No.	Pos.	Nation	Player

=== Lamia ===
In:

No.	Pos.	Nation	Player

Out:

No.	Pos.	Nation	Player

=== Asteras Tripolis ===
In:

No.	Pos.	Nation	Player

Out:

No.	Pos.	Nation	Player

=== Panetolikos ===
In:

No.	Pos.	Nation	Player

Out:

No.	Pos.	Nation	Player

=== OFI ===
In:

No.	Pos.	Nation	Player

Out:

No.	Pos.	Nation	Player

=== Atromitos ===
In:

No.	Pos.	Nation	Player

Out:

No.	Pos.	Nation	Player

=== Volos ===
In:

No.	Pos.	Nation	Player

Out:

No.	Pos.	Nation	Player

=== Levadiakos ===
In:

No.	Pos.	Nation	Player

Out:

No.	Pos.	Nation	Player

=== Athens Kallithea ===
In:

No.	Pos.	Nation	Player

Out:

No.	Pos.	Nation	Player
