= 2024–25 PAOK FC season =

PAOK
2024–25 season
- President: Ivan Savvidis
- Manager: Răzvan Lucescu
- Stadium: Toumba Stadium
- Super League 1: 3rd
- Greek Cup: Quarter-finals
- UEFA Champions League: Third qualifying round
- UEFA Europa League: Knockout phase play-offs
- Top goalscorer: League: Mady Camara (9); All: Andrija Zivkovic (12)
- Highest home attendance: 22,711 vs AEK (11 May 2025)
- Lowest home attendance: 4,819 vs Volos (12 January 2025)
- Average home league attendance: 14,273
Home colours	Away colours	Third colours
- All statistics correct as of 11 May 2025.

The 2024–25 PAOK FC season was the club's 99th season in existence and the club's 66th consecutive season in the top flight of Greek football. In addition to the domestic league, PAOK participated in this season's editions of the Greek Cup, the Champions League, and the Europa League. The season covers the period from 23 July 2024 to 30 June 2025.

== Coaching staff ==
Position	Staff
Head coach	(Romania) Răzvan Lucescu
Assistant Coach	
Goalkeeping Coach	(Portugal) Jose Moreira
Head Fitness Coach	(Italy) Matteo Spatafora
Fitness coach	(Italy) Paolo Castorina
Rehabilitation Coach	(Greece) Georgios Tsonakas

Last updated: 26 May 2021

== Players ==
=== Squad ===
As of 2 February 2025

Note: Flags indicate national team as defined under FIFA eligibility rules; some limited exceptions apply. Players may hold more than one non-FIFA nationality.

No.	Pos.	Nation	Player
1	GK	CZE	Jiří Pavlenka
2	MF	GUI	Mady Camara
4	MF	PER	Sergio Peña
5	DF	GRE	Giannis Michailidis
6	DF	CRO	Dejan Lovren
7	MF	GRE	Giannis Konstantelias
8	MF	FRA	Tiemoué Bakayoko
9	FW	RUS	Fyodor Chalov
11	FW	BRA	Taison (vice-captain)
14	MF	SRB	Andrija Živković (vice-captain)
15	DF	GAM	Omar Colley
16	DF	POL	Tomasz Kędziora
18	DF	MEX	Jonathan Gómez
19	DF	ESP	Jonny Otto
20	DF	POR	Vieirinha (captain)

No.	Pos.	Nation	Player
21	DF	GHA	Baba Rahman
22	MF	AUT	Stefan Schwab (vice-captain)
23	DF	ESP	Joan Sastre
25	DF	GRE	Konstantinos Thymianis
27	MF	RUS	Magomed Ozdoyev
28	DF	POL	Mateusz Wieteska
42	GK	CRO	Dominik Kotarski
47	FW	ENG	Shola Shoretire
54	GK	GRE	Konstantinos Balomenos
70	FW	TAN	Mbwana Samatta
71	FW	ESP	Brandon Thomas
77	MF	BUL	Kiril Despodov
80	MF	GRE	Dimitrios Pelkas
82	MF	FRA	Soualiho Meïté
99	GK	GRE	Antonis Tsiftsis

== Transfers ==
=== In ===
No.	Pos	Player	Transferred from	Fee	Date	Source
	MF	(Greece) Panagiotis Tzimas	(Greece) PAS Giannina	Loan return	1 July 2024	
24	MF	(Greece) Marios Tsaousis	(Greece) PAS Giannina	Loan return	1 July 2024	
88	DF	(Greece) Lefteris Lyratzis	(Greece) Asteras Tripolis	Loan return	1 July 2024	
50	MF	(Portugal) Filipe Soares	(Portugal) Famalicão	Loan return	1 July 2024	
25	DF	(Greece) Konstantinos Thymianis	(Greece) Panserraikos	Free transfer	17 June 2024	
2	MF	(Guinea) Mady Camara	(Italy) Roma	Free transfer	20 June 2024	
99	GK	(Greece) Antonis Tsiftsis	(Greece) Asteras Tripolis	€400,000 + 20% resale	23 June 2024	
16	DF	(Poland) Tomasz Kędziora	(Ukraine) Dynamo Kyiv	Free transfer	13 July 2024	
34	FW	(Morocco) Tarik Tissoudali	(Belgium) Gent	€2.2M	28 July 2024	
47	FW	(England) Shola Shoretire	(England) Manchester United	Free transfer	30 July 2024	
9	FW	(Russia) Fyodor Chalov	(Russia) CSKA Moscow	€3M	1 August 2024	
18	DF	(Mexico) Jonathan Gómez	(Spain) Real Sociedad	€400,000	23 August 2024	
8	MF	(France) Tiémoué Bakayoko	(France) Lorient	Transfer	31 August 2024	
15	DF	(The Gambia) Omar Colley	(Turkey) Beşiktaş	Transfer	31 August 2024	
6	DF	(Croatia) Dejan Lovren	(France) Lyon	Free transfer/Free Agent	16 September 2024	
1	GK	(Czech Republic) Jiří Pavlenka	(Germany) Werder Bremen	Free transfer/Free Agent	30 September 2024	
4	MF	(Peru) Sergio Peña	(Sweden) Malmö FF	€350,000	11 January 2025	
28	DF	(Poland) Mateusz Wieteska	(Italy) Cagliari	Loan	22 January 2025	
80	MF	(Greece) Dimitrios Pelkas	(Turkey) İstanbul Başakşehir	Free Transfer	24 January 2025	
82	MF	(France) Soualiho Meïté	(Portugal) Benfica	Loan	24 January 2025	
Total						€ 6,350,000.00

=== Out ===
No.	Pos	Player	Transferred to	Fee	Date	Source
18	GK	(Serbia) Živko Živković		End of contract	30 June 2024	
88	MF	(Brazil) Marcos Antônio	(Italy) Lazio	End of loan	30 June 2024	
16	DF	(Poland) Tomasz Kędziora	(Ukraine) Dynamo Kyiv	End of loan	30 June 2024	
8	MF	(France) Soualiho Meïté	(Portugal) Benfica	End of loan	30 June 2024	
95	FW	(Greece) Stefanos Tzimas	(Germany) Nürnberg	Loan	27 June 2024	
	MF	(Greece) Panagiotis Tzimas	(Greece) Asteras Tripolis	Free transfer	29 June 2024	
50	MF	(Portugal) Filipe Soares	(Portugal) Farense	Loan	9 July 2024	
15	DF	(Nigeria) William Troost-Ekong	(Saudi Arabia) Al-Kholood	€1.2M	23 August 2024	
6	MF	(Greece) Theocharis Tsingaras	(Greece) Atromitos	Undisclosed fee + ?% resale	26 August 2024	
64	GK	(Greece) Christos Talichmanidis	(Greece) Makedonikos	Loan	26 August 2024	
4	DF	(Greece) Konstantinos Koulierakis	(Germany) Wolfsburg	€11.75M	29 August 2024	
	DF	(Greece) Lefteris Lyratzis	(Netherlands) NEC	Loan	2 September 2024	
55	DF	(Portugal) Rafa Soares	(Portugal) Famalicão	Transfer	2 September 2024	
3	DF	(Norway) Ivan Näsberg	(Denmark) Viborg	Transfer	2 September 2024	
31	MF	(Portugal) André Ricardo	(Portugal) Chaves	Loan	2 September 2024	
10	MF	(Austria) Thomas Murg	(Saudi Arabia) Al-Khaleej	Loan	30 January 2025	
34	FW	(Morocco) Tarik Tissoudali	(United Arab Emirates) Khor Fakkan	Loan	2 February 2025	
95	FW	(Greece) Stefanos Tzimas	(Germany) Nürnberg	€18M + 15% resale	3 February 2025	
Total						€ 30,950,000.00

== Pre-season and other friendlies ==
Win Draw Loss

Wednesday, 3 July 2024 Friendly	PAOK	2–1	AEK Larnaca	Swolgen
19:00 EEST, UTC+03:00	Schwab 28'; Murg 39'		54'	Stadium: Multifunctionale accomodatie "De Kerkebos"

Saturday, 6 July 2024 Friendly	PAOK	0–1	Hibernian	Swolgen
17:00 EEST, UTC+03:00			5'	Stadium: Multifunctionale accomodatie "De Kerkebos"

Wednesday, 10 July 2024 Friendly	PAOK	1–3	Genk	Horst
19:00 EEST, UTC+03:00	Baba 49'		6', 10', 85'	Stadium: Sportpark Ter Horst
Note: Two-hour game consisting of four 30 minute quarters

Saturday, 13 July 2024 Friendly	PAOK	1–2	Union Saint-Gilloise	Horst
15:00 EEST, UTC+03:00	Schwab 27' (pen.)		50', 66'	Stadium: Sportpark Ter Horst

Saturday, 13 July 2024 Friendly	PAOK	1–2	Vitesse	Driel
20:00 EEST, UTC+03:00	Samatta 11'		51', 54'	Stadium: Sportpark RKSV Driel

== Competitions ==
=== Overview ===
Competition	First match	Last match	Starting round	Record							
Competition	First match	Last match	Starting round	Pld	W	D	L	GF	GA	GD	Win %
Super League Greece	17 August 2024	11 May 2025	Matchday 1	32	18	4	10	62	37	+25	56.25
Greek Football Cup	30 October 2024	9 January 2025	Round of 16	4	2	1	1	11	3	+8	50.00
Champions League	24 July 2024	13 August 2024	Second qualifying round	4	2	1	1	9	8	+1	50.00
Europa League	22 August 2024	20 February 2025	Play-off round	12	5	1	6	19	14	+5	41.67
Total				52	27	7	18	101	62	+39	51.92

Source: Soccerway

=== Managerial statistics ===
Head coach	From	To	Record							
Head coach	From	To	G	W	D	L	GF	GA	GD	Win %
(Romania) Răzvan Lucescu	1 July 2024	Present	52	27	7	18	101	62	+39	51.92

Last updated: 11 May 2025

=== Super League Greece ===
==== League table ====
Pos	Team	Pld	W	D	L	GF	GA	GD	Pts	Qualification or relegation
2	AEK Athens	26	16	5	5	44	16	+28	53	Qualification for the Championship play-offs
3	Panathinaikos	26	14	8	4	31	22	+9	50	Qualification for the Championship play-offs
4	PAOK	26	14	4	8	51	26	+25	46	Qualification for the Championship play-offs
5	Aris	26	12	6	8	31	28	+3	42	Qualification for the Europe play-offs
6	OFI	26	10	6	10	37	38	−1	36	Qualification for the Europe play-offs

Source: Super League Greece
Rules for classification: 1) Points; 2) Head-to-head points; 3) Head-to-head goal difference; 4) Goal difference; 5) Goals scored; 6) Play-offs (neutral ground).
(Note: Criterion 6 is only used if needed to decide champion, teams for relegation or teams for UEFA competitions).

==== Matches ====
Saturday, 17 August 2024 1	PAOK	3–2	Panserraikos	Thessaloniki
20:00 EEST, UTC+03:00	Schwab 35' (pen.), 60' (pen.); Ozdoyev (yellow card) 45', (goal) 45+3'	Report	31' (pen.), 49'	Stadium: Toumba Stadium; Attendance: 7,668; Referee: Vasilis Fotias (Pella)

Sunday, 25 August 2025 2	PAOK	2–0	Panetolikos	Thessaloniki
20:30 EEST, UTC+03:00	Michailidis (yellow card) 38'; Sastre 51'; Camara (yellow card) 63'; Tissoudali 79'	Report		Stadium: Toumba Stadium; Attendance: 10,171; Referee: Christos Vergetis (Arcardia)

Sunday, 1 September 2024 3	Atromitos	1–2	PAOK	Peristeri
20:30 EEST, UTC+03:00	85' (pen.)	Report	45', (yellow card) 85' A. Živković; (yellow card) 69' Baba; 90' Camara; (yellow card) 90+5' Tissoudali	Stadium: Peristeri Stadium; Attendance: 2,573; Referee: Spiridon Zabalas (Epirus)

Sunday, 15 September 2024 4	PAOK	0–0	Panathinaikos	Thessaloniki
20:30 EEST, UTC+03:00	A. Živković (yellow card) 36'	Report		Stadium: Toumba Stadium; Attendance: 18,511; Referee: Slavko Vinčić (Slovenia)

Saturday, 21 September 2024 5	Volos	1–4	PAOK	Volos
17:00 EEST, UTC+03:00	(penalty missed) 3'; (yellow card) 23' (yellow-red card) 34'; 56'	Report	(yellow card) 20' Baba; 24' (pen.) Schwab; 54' Murg; 60' Taison; 89' Chalov	Stadium: Panthessaliko Stadium; Attendance: 3,186; Referee: Petros Tsagarakis (Chania)

Sunday, 29 September 2024 6	PAOK	0–1	Aris	Thessaloniki
20:30 EEST, UTC+03:00	Michailidis (yellow card) 20'; Baba (yellow card) 55'	Report	63'	Stadium: Toumba Stadium; Attendance: 19,282; Referee: Harm Osmers (Germany)

Sunday, 6 October 2024 7	Levadiakos	0–2	PAOK	Livadeia
19:00 EEST, UTC+03:00	(penalty missed) 70'	Report	(yellow card) 29' Jonny; (yellow card) 41' Gómez; (yellow card) 63' Lovren; (yellow card) 67', (goal) 90+2' (pen.) Schwab; 86' Camara; (yellow card) 88' Vieirinha	Stadium: Levadia Municipal Stadium; Attendance: 1,012; Referee: Christos Vergetis (Arcardia)

Sunday, 20 October 2024 8	AEK	1–1	PAOK	Nea Filadelfeia
20:30 EEST, UTC+03:00	25'	Report	15' Baba; (yellow card) 54' Ozdoyev	Stadium: Agia Sophia Stadium; Attendance: 30,950; Referee: Rade Obrenović (Slovenia)

Sunday, 27 October 2024 9	PAOK	1–2	OFI	Thessaloniki
21:00 EET, UTC+02:00	Despodov 35'; Konstantelias (yellow card) 42'; Jonny (yellow card) 58'; Gómez (yellow card) 78'; Camara (yellow card) 88'	Report	77', 79'	Stadium: Toumba Stadium; Attendance: 12,419; Referee: Alexandros Tsakalidis (Chalkidiki)

Sunday, 3 November 2024 10	Lamia	1–2	PAOK	Lamia
20:30 EET, UTC+02:00	33'	Report	59' A. Živković; 75'Tissoudali; (yellow card) 90+1' Camara	Stadium: Lamia Municipal Stadium; Attendance: 1,412; Referee: Stavros Tsimenteridis (Kozani)

Sunday, 10 November 2024 11	PAOK	2–3	Olympiacos	Thessaloniki
20:30 EET, UTC+02:00	Bakayoko (yellow card) 35'; Baba 59'; Camara (yellow card) 61'; 81' (o.g.)	Report	32', 50', 69'	Stadium: Toumba Stadium; Attendance: 21,684; Referee: Sven Jablonski (Germany)

Sunday, 24 November 2024 12	Asteras Tripolis	1–2	PAOK	Tripoli
19:30 EET, UTC+02:00	50'	Report	(yellow card) 31' A. Živković; 68' (o.g.); 85' Baba	Stadium: Theodoros Kolokotronis Stadium; Attendance: 1,855; Referee: Konstantinos Katoikos (Athens)

Sunday, 1 December 2024 13	PAOK	2–2	Athens Kallithea	Thessaloniki
19:00 EET, UTC+02:00	Konstantelias 21'; Colley (yellow card) 51'; Despodov 82'	Report	59', 90+1'	Stadium: Toumba Stadium; Attendance: 4,742; Referee: Athanasios Tzilos (Larissa)

Sunday, 8 December 2024 14	Panserraikos	1–4	PAOK	Serres
15:30 EET, UTC+02:00	(yellow card) 18' (yellow-red card) 19'; 76'	Report	4' (o.g.); (yellow card) 32', (goal) 36' Despodov; 66' Baba; 87' Shoretire	Stadium: Serres Municipal Stadium; Attendance: 4,971; Referee: Christos Vergetis (Arcadia)

Sunday, 15 December 2024 15	Panetolikos	0–1	PAOK	Agrinio
17:00 EET, UTC+02:00	(penalty missed) 23'	Report	(yellow card) 36' Kędziora; (yellow card) 76' Konstantelias; 87', (yellow card) 90+1' Camara	Stadium: Panetolikos Stadium; Attendance: 2,087; Referee: Alexandros Tsakalidis (Chalkidiki)

Sunday, 22 December 2024 16	PAOK	3–0	Atromitos	Thessaloniki
19:30 EET, UTC+02:00	Despodov (yellow card) 28'; Baba 45+2'; A. Živković 49'; Michailidis (yellow card) 57'; Camara 89'	Report	(red card) 21'; (penalty missed) 59'	Stadium: Toumba Stadium; Attendance: 17,275; Referee: Vasilis Fotias (Pella)

Sunday, 5 January 2025 17	Panathinaikos	2–1	PAOK	Marousi
20:30 EET, UTC+02:00	12', 90'	Report	2' Živković; (yellow card) 45+3' (yellow-red card) 60' Baba; (yellow card) 83' Schwab; (yellow card) 83' Lovren; (yellow card) 90+5' Shoretire	Stadium: Athens Olympic Stadium; Attendance: Behind closed doors Referee: Morten Krogh (Denmark)

Sunday, 12 January 2025 18	PAOK	1–2	Volos	Thessaloniki
19:30 EET, UTC+02:00	Vieirinha (yellow card) 5'; Camara 69', (yellow card) 85'	Report	90+2', 90+4'	Stadium: Toumba Stadium; Attendance: 4,819; Referee: Fotis Polichronis (Pieria)

Sunday, 19 January 2025 19	Aris	0–0	PAOK	Thessaloniki
19:00 EET, UTC+02:00		Report	(yellow card) 90+1' Kędziora	Stadium: Kleanthis Vikelidis Stadium; Attendance: 10,558; Referee: Sascha Stegeman (Germany)

Sunday, 26 January 2025 20	PAOK	1–0	Levadiakos	Thessaloniki
19:30 EET, UTC+02:00	Camara 82'	Report		Stadium: Toumba Stadium; Attendance: 11,559; Referee: Alexandros Katsikogiannis (Epirus)

Sunday, 2 February 2025 21	PAOK	1–2	AEK	Thessaloniki
19:30 EET, UTC+02:00	Jonny (yellow card) 35'; Camara (yellow card) 45+2'; Baba 52'; Pelkas (yellow card) 90+6'	Report	37', 48'	Stadium: Toumba Stadium; Attendance: 22,150; Referee: Felix Zwayer (Germany)

Saturday, 8 February 2025 22	OFI	0–5	PAOK	Heraklion
20:00 EET, UTC+02:00	(red card) 12'	Report	2', 67' Samatta; (yellow card) 5' Shoretire; 8' Pelkas; 30' (pen.) Schwab; (yellow card) 43', (goal) 58' Michailidis; (yellow card) 88' Wieteska	Stadium: Theodoros Vardinogiannis Stadium; Attendance: 4,684; Referee: Fotis Polychronis (Pieria)

Sunday, 16 February 2025 23	PAOK	7–0	Lamia	Thessaloniki
20:00 EET, UTC+02:00	Ozdoyev (yellow card) 16'; Samatta 25'; Konstantelias 37', 51', 58'; Chalov 72'; A. Živković 86'; Shoretire 90+2'	Report		Stadium: Toumba Stadium; Attendance: 7,672; Referee: Konstantinos Katoikos (Athens)

Sunday, 23 February 2025 24	Olympiacos	2–1	PAOK	Piraeus
20:30 EET, UTC+02:00	6'; 31'	Report	Camara 24'; Konstantelias (yellow card) 33'; Sastre (yellow card) 45+3'	Stadium: Karaiskakis Stadium; Attendance: 32,431; Referee: Tobias Stieler (Germany)

Sunday, 2 March 2025 25	PAOK	2–0	Asteras Tripolis	Thessaloniki
19:30 EET, UTC+02:00	Taison 24'; Samatta 51'	Report		Stadium: Toumba Stadium; Attendance: 9,121; Referee: Anastasios Sidiropoulos (Dodecanese)

Sunday, 9 March 2025 26	Athens Kallithea	2–1	PAOK	Ampelokipoi
19:00 EET, UTC+02:00	14'; (penalty missed) 45+1'; 90'	Report	2' Despodov	Stadium: Leoforos Alexandras Stadium; Attendance: 401; Referee: Konstantinos Katoikos (Athens)

==== Results by round ====
Round	1	2	3	4	5	6	7	8	9	10	11	12	13	14	15	16	17	18	19	20	21	22	23	24	25	26
Ground	H	H	A	H	A	H	A	A	H	A	H	A	H	A	A	H	A	H	A	H	H	A	H	A	H	A
Result	W	W	W	D	W	L	W	D	L	W	L	W	D	W	W	W	L	L	D	W	L	W	W	L	W	L
Position	3	1	2	3	1	3	1	2	2	2	4	2	3	3	3	2	4	4	4	4	4	4	4	4	4	4

A = Away; H = Home; W = Win; D = Draw; L = Loss

==== Results summary ====
Overall								Home						Away					
Pld	W	D	L	GF	GA	GD	Pts	W	D	L	GF	GA	GD	W	D	L	GF	GA	GD
26	14	4	8	51	26	+25	46	6	2	5	25	14	+11	8	2	3	26	12	+14

== Play-off round ==
The top four teams from Regular season will meet twice (6 matches per team) for places in 2025–26 UEFA Champions League, 2025–26 UEFA Europa Conference League and potentially 2025–26 UEFA Europa League (depending on this season's Greek Cup), as well as deciding the league champion.

Pos	Team	Pld	W	D	L	GF	GA	GD	Pts	Qualification
1	Olympiacos (C)	32	23	6	3	58	22	+36	75	Qualification for the Champions League league phase (Note: Olympiacos originally qualified for the 2025–26 UEFA Champions League second qualifying round, but since the 2024–25 UEFA Champions League winner (Paris Saint-Germain) already qualified via their domestic league, Olympiacos was promoted to the Champions League league phase as the league champion with the highest club coefficient in the Champions League Champions Path qualifying rounds.)
2	Panathinaikos	32	17	8	7	42	32	+10	59	Qualification for the Champions League second qualifying round
3	PAOK	32	18	4	10	62	37	+25	58	Qualification for the Europa League third qualifying round (Note: Since the 2024–25 Greek Cup winner (Olympiacos) qualified for the Champions League, the Europa League third qualifying round place was passed to the third-placed team.)
4	AEK Athens	32	16	5	11	48	28	+20	53	Qualification for the Conference League second qualifying round

Source: Super League Greece
Rules for classification: 1) Points; 2) Head-to-head points (Regular season and play-off); 3) Head-to-head goal difference (Regular season and play-off); 4) Regular season position.
(C) Champions

=== Results summary ===
Overall								Home						Away					
Pld	W	D	L	GF	GA	GD	Pts	W	D	L	GF	GA	GD	W	D	L	GF	GA	GD
6	4	0	2	11	11	0	12	3	0	0	5	2	+3	1	0	2	6	9	−3

=== Results by round ===
Round	1	2	3	4	5	6
Ground	A	H	A	H	A	H
Result	W	W	L	W	L	W
Position	4	4	4	3	3	3

Updated to match(es) played on 11 May 2025. Source: League matches
A = Away; H = Home; W = Win; D = Draw; L = Loss

=== Matches ===
Sunday, 30 March 2025 1	AEK	2–3	PAOK	Nea Filadelfeia
19:00 EEST, UTC+03:00	22' (pen.), 47'	Report	(yellow card) 9' Michailidis; (yellow card) 20' Kotarski; (yellow card) 25' Kędziora; 58' Konstantelias; 66' A. Živković; (yellow card) 81' Baba; 85' Pelkas; (yellow card) 88' Ozdoyev	Stadium: Agia Sophia Stadium; Attendance: 25,433; Referee: Felix Brych (Germany)

Sunday, 6 April 2025 2	PAOK	2–1	Olympiacos	Thessaloniki
19:30 EEST, UTC+03:00	Konstantelias 5'; Ozdoyev (yellow card) 8'; Camara 11', (red card) 74'; Pelkas (yellow card) 42'; A. Živković (yellow card) 71'	Report	52'	Stadium: Toumba Stadium; Attendance: 20,312; Referee: Sascha Stegemann (Germany)

Sunday, 13 April 2025 3	Panathinaikos	3–1	PAOK	Marousi
19:00 EEST, UTC+03:00	33', 42', 50'	Report	(yellow card) 21' Chalov; (yellow card) 28' Pelkas; 78' Konstantelias; (yellow card) 84' Schwab; (yellow card) 87' Samatta; (yellow card) 90+4' Ozdoyev	Stadium: Athens Olympic Stadium; Attendance: 14,350; Referee: Felix Zwayer (Germany)

Sunday, 27 April 2025 4	PAOK	2–1	Panathinaikos	Thessaloniki
20:00 EEST, UTC+03:00	Michailidis 35'; Camara 59'; Jonny (yellow card) 71'; Schwab (yellow card) 88'	Report	3'	Stadium: Toumba Stadium; Attendance: 18,275; Referee: Harm Osmers (Germany)

Sunday, 4 May 2025 5	Olympiacos	4–2	PAOK	Piraeus
20:00 EEST, UTC+03:00	14', 30', 81', 87'	Report	1', 32' A. Živković	Stadium: Karaiskakis Stadium; Attendance: 32,550; Referee: Deniz Aytekin (Germany)

Sunday, 11 May 2025 6	PAOK	1–0	AEK	Thessaloniki
20:00 EEST, UTC+03:00	Michailidis 45'; A. Živković (yellow card) 69'; Konstantelias (yellow card) 84'; Kotarski (yellow card) 90+6'	Report		Stadium: Toumba Stadium; Attendance: 22,711; Referee: Sören Storks (Germany)

=== Greek Cup ===
==== Round of 16 ====
Wednesday, 30 October 2024 1st leg	Egaleo	0–3	PAOK	Aigaleo
15:30 EET, UTC+02:00		Report	14' Camara; 39' Shoretire; (yellow card) 47' Kędziora; 54' Murg; (red card) 61' Michailidis	Stadium: Stavros Mavrothalassitis Stadium; Referee: Panagiotis Tsiaras (Kavala)

Wednesday, 4 December 2024 2nd leg	PAOK	7–1 (10–1 agg.)	Egaleo	Thessaloniki
15:30 EET, UTC+02:00	Shoretire 6'; Tissoudali 12', 47', 51'; Živković 36'; Taison 80'; Brandon 81'	Report	23'	Stadium: Toumba Stadium; Referee: Alexandros Katsikogiannis (Epirus)

==== Quarter-finals ====
Wednesday, 18 December 2024 1st leg	AEK	1–0	PAOK	Nea Filadelfeia
21:00 EET, UTC+02:00	(penalty missed) 22'; 53'	Report	(yellow card) 21' Kotarski; (yellow card) 79', (red card) 90+2' Lovren; (yellow card) 82' Ozdoyev	Stadium: Agia Sophia Stadium; Attendance: 27,612; Referee: Simone Sozza (Italy)

Thursday, 9 January 2025 2nd leg	PAOK	1–1 (1–2 agg.)	AEK	Thessaloniki
19:30 EET, UTC+02:00	Kędziora (yellow card) 25'; A. Živković 90+1', (yellow card) 90+3'; Sastre (yellow card) 94'; Shoretire (yellow card) 99'	Report	107'	Stadium: Toumba Stadium; Attendance: 22,837; Referee: Igor Pajač (Croatia)

=== UEFA Champions League ===
==== Second qualifying round ====
24 July 2024 First leg	PAOK (Greece)	3–2	(Bosnia and Herzegovina) Borac Banja Luka	Thessaloniki, Greece
20:30 EEST	Koulierakis 17', 39'; Schwab (yellow card) 21'; Troost-Ekong 51'	Report	22' (pen.), 45+3'	Stadium: Toumba Stadium; Attendance: 16,135; Referee: David Šmajc (Slovenia)

31 July 2024 Second leg	Borac Banja Luka (Bosnia and Herzegovina)	0–1 (2–4 agg.)	(Greece) PAOK	Banja Luka, Bosnia and Herzegovina
22:00 EEST		Report	Murg 25'; Schwab (yellow card) 39'	Stadium: Banja Luka City Stadium; Attendance: 9,500; Referee: Sander van der Eijk (Netherlands)

==== Third qualifying round ====
6 August 2024 First leg	Malmö FF (Sweden)	2–2	(Greece) PAOK	Malmö, Sweden
20:00 EEST	28', 67'	Report	Taison 42'; Baba (yellow card) 70', (goal) 75'; Sastre (yellow card) 72'; Camara (yellow card) 84'; Ozdoyev (yellow card) 90+2'	Stadium: Eleda Stadion; Attendance: 18,658; Referee: John Beaton (Scotland)

13 August 2024 Second leg	PAOK (Greece)	3–4 (a.e.t.) (5–6 agg.)	(Sweden) Malmö FF	Thessaloniki, Greece
20:30 EEST	Taison 21'; Sastre (yellow card) 37'; Koulierakis 43', (yellow card) 120'; Živković 45+3'; Baba (yellow card) 65'; Murg (yellow card) 100'	Report	10', 45', 90+6', 99'	Stadium: Toumba Stadium; Attendance: 17,678; Referee: Marco Di Bello (Italy)

=== UEFA Europa League ===
==== Play-off round ====
22 August 2024 First leg	PAOK (Greece)	4–0	(Republic of Ireland) Shamrock Rovers	Thessaloniki, Greece
20:30 EEST	Cleary 45+5' (o.g.); Taison 47'; Konstantelias 67'; Chalov (penalty missed) 90+3'; Baba 90+5'	Report	(yellow card) 22' (yellow-red card) 52'	Stadium: Toumba Stadium; Attendance: 13,871; Referee: Enea Jorgji (Albania)

29 August 2024 Second leg	Shamrock Rovers (Republic of Ireland)	0–2 (0–6 agg.)	(Greece) PAOK	Dublin, Ireland
22:00 EEST		Report	(yellow card) 52' Michailidis; 64'Ozdoyev; 75'Despodov	Stadium: Tallaght Stadium; Attendance: 5,079; Referee: Donatas Rumšas (Lithuania)

==== League phase ====
The match schedule was released on 31 August 2024, the day after the draw.

==== Europa League table ====
Pos	Team	Pld	W	D	L	GF	GA	GD	Pts	Qualification
20	(Danish Football Association) Midtjylland	8	3	2	3	9	9	0	11	Advance to knockout phase play-offs (unseeded)
21	(Royal Belgian Football Association) Union Saint-Gilloise	8	3	2	3	8	8	0	11	Advance to knockout phase play-offs (unseeded)
22	(Hellenic Football Federation) PAOK	8	3	1	4	12	10	+2	10	Advance to knockout phase play-offs (unseeded)
23	(Royal Dutch Football Association) Twente	8	2	4	2	8	9	−1	10	Advance to knockout phase play-offs (unseeded)
24	(Turkish Football Federation) Fenerbahçe	8	2	4	2	9	11	−2	10	Advance to knockout phase play-offs (unseeded)

Source: UEFA
Rules for classification: League phase tiebreakers

25 September 2024 1	Galatasaray (Turkey)	3–1	(Greece) PAOK	Istanbul, Turkey
22:00 EEST	Baba 48'; Akgün 75'; Icardi 90+5'	Report	(yellow card) 28'Ozdoyev; 67' Konstantelias	Stadium: Rams Park; Attendance: 50,700; Referee: Alejandro Hernández Hernández (Spain)

3 October 2024 2	PAOK (Greece)	0–1	(Romania) FCSB	Thessaloniki, Greece
22:00 EEST	Camara (yellow card) 4'; Sastre (yellow card) 45+2'	Report	Tănase (yellow card) 16'; Popescu (yellow card) 43'; Olaru (yellow card) 45+4' (yellow-red card) 55'; Bîrligea 45+8', (yellow card) 71'; Târnovanu (yellow card) 86'	Stadium: Toumba Stadium; Attendance: 14,340; Referee: Sascha Stegemann (Germany)

24 October 2024 3	PAOK (Greece)	2–2	(Czech Republic) Viktoria Plzeň	Thessaloniki, Greece
19:45 EEST	Tissoudali (yellow card) 82', (goal) 84'; Baba 90+3'	Report	Dweh (yellow card) 11' (yellow-red card) 70'; Havel 31'; Vydra 39'; Marković (yellow card) 41'; Adu (yellow card) 70'; Jedlička (yellow card) 90'	Stadium: Toumba Stadium; Attendance: 16,144; Referee: Urs Schnyder (Switzerland)

7 November 2024 4	Manchester United (England)	2–0	(Greece) PAOK	Manchester, England
22:00 EET	Diallo 50', 77'; Ugarte (yellow card) 55'; Casemiro (yellow card) 85'	Report	Tissoudali (yellow card) 56'	Stadium: Old Trafford; Attendance: 73,174; Referee: Daniele Chiffi (Italy); Man of the Match: Amad Diallo

28 November 2024 5	RFS (Latvia)	0–2	(Greece) PAOK	Riga, Latvia
19:45 EET		Report	2' Despodov; (yellow card) 47' Camara; 59' Chalov	Stadium: Daugava Stadium; Attendance: 5,346; Referee: Julian Weinberger (Austria)

12 December 2024 6	PAOK (Greece)	5–0	(Hungary) Ferencváros	Thessaloniki, Greece
22:00 EET	Taison 10', (yellow card) 45+2'; Brandon 29'; Camara (yellow card) 50'; Chalov 76'; Živković 80' (pen.); Despodov 89'	Report		Stadium: Toumba Stadium; Attendance: 18,121; Referee: Guillermo Cuadra Fernández (Spain)

23 January 2025 7	PAOK (Greece)	2–0	(Czech Republic) Slavia	Thessaloniki, Greece
22:00 EET	Schwab 26' (pen.); Jonny Otto (yellow card) 41'; Konstantelias 56'; Despodov (yellow card) 59'	Report		Stadium: Toumba Stadium; Attendance: 17,507; Referee: Matej Jug (Slovenia)

30 January 2025 8	Real Sociedad (Spain)	2–0	(Greece) PAOK	Donostia-San Sebastián, Spain
22:00 EET	43', 48'	Report	(yellow card) 6' Ozdoyev; (yellow card) 49' Brandon	Stadium: Anoeta Stadium; Attendance: 23,872; Referee: John Beaton (Scotland)

==== Knockout phase ====
The draw for the League phase was held on 31 January 2025.

==== Knockout phase play-offs ====
13 February 2025 First leg	PAOK (Greece)	1–2	(Romania) FCSB	Thessaloniki, Greece
21:00 (22:00 UTC+2)	Pelkas (yellow card) 14'; Samatta 21'; Taison (yellow card) 32' (yellow-red card) 45+4'; Tsiftsis (yellow card) ?'	Report	50'; 60'	Stadium: Toumba Stadium; Attendance: 18,343; Referee: Lawrence Visser (Belgium)

20 February 2025 Second leg	FCSB (Romania)	2–0 (4–1 agg.)	(Greece) PAOK	Bucharest, Romania
18:45 (19:45 UTC+2)	30'; 81'	Report	(yellow card) 44' A. Živković; (yellow card) 49' Jonny; (yellow card) 54' Michailidis; (yellow card) 64' Despodov; (yellow card) 83' Kotarski	Stadium: Arena Națională; Attendance: 50,248; Referee: Matej Jug (Slovenia)

== Statistics ==
=== Squad statistics ===
The squad was informed and the official page of PAOK FC.

As of 11 May 2025

Appearances denote players in the starting lineup, with the numbers in parentheses denoting appearances as substitute.

No.	Name	Super League		Greek Cup		Champions League		Europa League		Total	
No.	Name	Apps	Goals	Apps	Goals	Apps	Goals	Apps	Goals	Apps	Goals
Goalkeepers
42	(Croatia) Dominik Kotarski	28	0	2	0	4	0	12	0	46	0
99	(Greece) Antonis Tsiftsis	2	0	0	0	0	0	0	0	2	0
1	(Czech Republic) Jiří Pavlenka	2	0	2	0	0	0	0	0	4	0
Defenders
16	(Poland) Tomasz Kędziora	25	0	3	0	2	0	12	0	42	0
21	(Ghana) Baba Rahman	24 (5)	5	1	0	4	1	11 (1)	2	40 (6)	8
23	(Spain) Joan Sastre	14 (5)	1	3	0	3	0	2 (2)	0	22 (7)	1
5	(Greece) Giannis Michailidis	16 (1)	3	3	0	0	0	8	0	27 (1)	3
23	(Spain) Jonny	19 (3)	0	1	0	1	0	11	0	32 (3)	0
25	(Greece) Konstantinos Thymianis	0 (3)	0	1 (1)	0	0	0	0 (1)	0	1 (5)	0
15	(The Gambia) Omar Colley	6 (2)	0	0	0	0	0	3 (2)	0	9 (4)	0
18	(Mexico) Jonathan Gómez	2	0	2	0	0	0	0	0	4	0
6	(Croatia) Dejan Lovren	7	0	2	0	0	0	0	0	9	0
90	(Greece) Dimitrios Kottas	0	0	0 (1)	0	0	0	0	0	0 (1)	0
28	(Poland) Mateusz Wieteska	10	0	0	0	0	0	0	0	10	0
Midfielders
22	(Austria) Stefan Schwab	16 (11)	5	0 (4)	0	3 (1)	0	5 (6)	1	24 (22)	6
20	(Portugal) Vieirinha	2 (8)	0	1 (1)	0	0 (2)	0	0	0	3 (11)	0
7	(Greece) Giannis Konstantelias	23 (6)	7	2 (1)	0	2 (2)	0	9 (2)	3	36 (11)	10
27	(Russia) Magomed Ozdoyev	19 (6)	1	2	0	4	0	10 (1)	1	35 (7)	2
2	(Guinea) Mady Camara	19 (10)	9	4	1	1 (3)	0	8 (3)	0	32 (16)	10
8	(France) Tiemoué Bakayoko	3 (1)	0	1	0	0	0	1 (2)	1	5 (3)	1
4	(Peru) Sergio Peña	2 (3)	0	0	0	0	0	0	0	2 (3)	0
80	(Greece) Dimitrios Pelkas	5 (8)	2	0	0	0	0	2	0	7 (8)	2
82	(France) Soualiho Meïté	6 (4)	0	0	0	0	0	2	0	8 (4)	0
Forwards
14	(Serbia) Andrija Živković	19 (6)	8	4	1	2 (2)	1	8 (1)	1	33 (9)	11
71	(Spain) Brandon Thomas	9 (3)	0	1 (1)	1	4	0	4 (3)	1	18 (7)	2
77	(Bulgaria) Kiril Despodov	14 (11)	4	0 (3)	0	2 (2)	0	5 (7)	3	21 (23)	7
70	(Tanzania) Mbwana Samatta	5 (7)	4	1 (3)	0	0 (2)	0	2	1	8 (12)	5
11	(Brazil) Taison	18 (7)	2	2 (1)	1	4	2	9 (1)	2	33 (9)	7
47	(England) Shola Shoretire	5 (13)	2	2 (1)	2	0	0	0 (6)	0	7 (20)	4
9	(Russia) Fyodor Chalov	10 (16)	3	2	0	0 (1)	0	4 (7)	2	16 (24)	5
Players transferred out during the season
15	(Nigeria) William Troost-Ekong	0	0	0	0	2	1	0	0	2	1
6	(Greece) Theocharis Tsingaras	0	0	0	0	0 (1)	0	0	0	0 (1)	0
4	(Greece) Konstantinos Koulierakis	0	0	0	0	4	3	1	0	5	3
55	(Portugal) Rafa Soares	2	0	0	0	0	0	0 (1)	0	2 (1)	0
3	(Norway) Ivan Näsberg	1	0	0	0	0	0	0	0	1	0
10	(Austria) Thomas Murg	12 (2)	1	1 (1)	1	2 (2)	1	1 (1)	0	16 (6)	3
34	(Morocco) Tarik Tissoudali	8 (8)	2	1 (2)	3	0 (3)	0	2 (4)	1	11 (17)	6

=== Goalscorers ===
As of 11 May 2025

Rank	No.	Pos.	Player	Super League	Greek Cup	Champions League	Europa League	Total
1	14	FW	(Serbia) Živković	8	2	1	1	12
2	7	MF	(Greece) Konstantelias	7	0	0	3	10
	2	MF	(Guinea) Camara	9	1	0	0	10
4	21	DF	(Ghana) Baba	5	0	1	2	8
5	11	FW	(Brazil) Taison	2	1	2	2	7
	77	FW	(Bulgaria) Despodov	4	0	0	3	7
7	34	FW	(Morocco) Tissoudali	2	3	0	1	6
	22	MF	(Austria) Schwab	5	0	0	1	6
9	9	FW	(Russia) Chalov	3	0	0	2	5
	70	FW	(Tanzania) Samatta	4	0	0	1	5
11	47	FW	(England) Shoretire	2	2	0	0	4
12	4	DF	(Greece) Koulierakis	0	0	3	0	3
	10	MF	(Austria) Murg	1	1	1	0	3
	5	DF	(Greece) Michailidis	3	0	0	0	3
15	27	MF	(Russia) Ozdoyev	1	0	0	1	2
	71	FW	(Spain) Brandon	0	1	0	1	2
	80	MF	(Greece) Pelkas	2	0	0	0	2
18	15	DF	(Nigeria) Troost-Ekong	0	0	1	0	1
	23	DF	(Spain) Sastre	1	0	0	0	1
Own goals				3	0	0	1	4
TOTAL				62	11	9	19	101

=== Clean sheets ===
As of 11 May 2025

Player	League	Cup	CL	EL	Total	Games played	Percentage
(Croatia) Dominik Kotarski	9		1	5	15	46	32,61%
(Greece) Antonis Tsiftsis	1				1	2	50,00%
(Czech Republic) Jiří Pavlenka	1	1			2	4	50,00%
Total	11	1	1	5	18	52	34,62%

=== Disciplinary record ===
As of 11 May 2025

S	P	N	Name	Super League			Greek Cup			Champions League			Europa League			Total		
S	P	N	Name	Yellow card	Yellow-red card	Red card	Yellow card	Yellow-red card	Red card	Yellow card	Yellow-red card	Red card	Yellow card	Yellow-red card	Red card	Yellow card	Yellow-red card	Red card
22	MF	(Austria)	Schwab	4	0	0	0	0	0	2	0	0	0	0	0	6	0	0
21	MF	(Ghana)	Baba	4	1	0	0	0	0	2	0	0	0	0	0	6	1	0
23	DF	(Spain)	Sastre	1	0	0	1	0	0	2	0	0	1	0	0	5	0	0
2	MF	(Guinea)	Camara	7	0	1	1	0	0	1	0	0	3	0	0	12	0	1
27	MF	(Russia)	Ozdoyev	6	0	0	1	0	0	1	0	0	2	0	0	10	0	0
5	DF	(Greece)	Michailidis	5	0	0	0	0	1	0	0	0	2	0	0	7	0	1
14	FW	(Serbia)	Živković	5	0	0	1	0	0	0	0	0	1	0	0	7	0	0
19	DF	(Spain)	Jonny	4	0	0	0	0	0	0	0	0	2	0	0	6	0	0
18	DF	(Mexico)	Gómez	2	0	0	0	0	0	0	0	0	0	0	0	2	0	0
6	DF	(Spain)	Lovren	2	0	0	1	0	1	0	0	0	0	0	0	3	0	1
20	DF	(Portugal)	Vieirinha	2	0	0	0	0	0	0	0	0	0	0	0	2	0	0
7	MF	(Greece)	Konstantelias	4	0	0	0	0	0	0	0	0	0	0	0	4	0	0
8	MF	(France)	Bakayoko	1	0	0	0	0	0	0	0	0	0	0	0	1	0	0
15	DF	(The Gambia)	Colley	1	0	0	0	0	0	0	0	0	0	0	0	1	0	0
77	FW	(Bulgaria)	Despodov	2	0	0	0	0	0	0	0	0	2	0	0	4	0	0
11	FW	(Brazil)	Taison	0	0	0	0	0	0	0	0	0	1	1	0	1	1	0
16	DF	(Poland)	Kędziora	3	0	0	1	0	0	0	0	0	0	0	0	4	0	0
42	GK	(Croatia)	Kotarski	2	0	0	1	0	0	0	0	0	1	0	0	4	0	0
47	FW	(England)	Shoretire	2	0	0	1	0	0	0	0	0	0	0	0	3	0	0
71	FW	(Spain)	Brandon	0	0	0	0	0	0	0	0	0	1	0	0	1	0	0
80	MF	(Greece)	Pelkas	3	0	0	0	0	0	0	0	0	1	0	0	4	0	0
99	GK	(Greece)	Tsiftsis	0	0	0	0	0	0	0	0	0	1	0	0	1	0	0
28	DF	(Poland)	Wieteska	1	0	0	0	0	0	0	0	0	0	0	0	1	0	0
9	FW	(Russia)	Chalov	1	0	0	0	0	0	0	0	0	0	0	0	1	0	0
70	FW	(Tanzania)	Samatta	1	0	0	0	0	0	0	0	0	0	0	0	1	0	0
Players transferred out during the season
4	DF	(Greece)	Koulierakis	0	0	0	0	0	0	1	0	0	0	0	0	1	0	0
10	MF	(Austria)	Murg	0	0	0	0	0	0	1	0	0	0	0	0	1	0	0
34	FW	(Morocco)	Tissoudali	1	0	0	0	0	0	0	0	0	2	0	0	3	0	0
