= Oscar Quagliatta =

Uruguayan footballer (born 1964)

Oscar Quagliata
Personal information
- Full name: Oscar Francisco Quagliata
- Date of birth: 30 October 1964 (age 61)
- Place of birth: Montevideo, Uruguay
- Position: Forward

Senior career*
Years	Team	Apps	(Gls)
1985–1988	Montevideo Wanderers		
1989	Huracán Buceo	20	(7)
1990–1991	Liverpool Montevideo		
1992	Huachipato	14	(1)
1993–1995	Central Español		
1995–1996	Deportivo Cali		
1998–1999	Central Español		
1999	Liverpool Montevideo		(1)
2000	Fénix		
2000	Montevideo Wanderers		
2001–2003	Rentistas		

Managerial career
- 2009: Blooming (assistant)
- 2010–2011: Defensor Sporting (assistant)
- 2012–2016: Independiente del Valle (assistant)
- 2016: Baniyas (assistant)
- 2017: Olimpia (assistant)
- 2017–2021: LDU Quito (assistant)
- 2021–2022: Nacional (assistant)
- 2022: Nacional (interim)
- 2023–2024: Santos Laguna (assistant)
- 2024: Atlético Nacional (assistant)
- * Club domestic league appearances and goals

Oscar Francisco Quagliata (born October 30, 1964, in Montevideo, Uruguay) is a former Uruguayan footballer who played for clubs of Uruguay, Chile and Colombia.

== Teams ==
- (Uruguay) Montevideo Wanderers 1985–1988
- (Uruguay) Huracán Buceo 1989
- (Uruguay) Liverpool 1990–1991
- (Chile) Huachipato 1992
- (Uruguay) Central Español 1993–1995
- (Colombia) Deportivo Cali 1996–1997
- (Uruguay) Central Español 1998–1999
- (Uruguay) Liverpool 1999
- (Uruguay) Fénix 2000
- (Uruguay) Montevideo Wanderers 2000
- (Uruguay) Rentistas 2001–2003

== Coaching career ==
Quagliatta has developed a career as assistant coach for clubs in Bolivia, Uruguay, Ecuador, the United Arab Emirates, Paraguay, Mexico and Colombia.

In 2022, he served as interim coach of Nacional due to suspension of the head coach, Pablo Repetto.

== Personal life ==
Oscar is the father of the footballer Nicolás Quagliata.
