= Konstantinos Thymianis =

Greek footballer

Personal information
- Date of birth: 28 February 2001 (age 25)
- Place of birth: Olympiada, Greece
- Height: 1.86 m (6 ft 1 in)
- Positions: Centre-back; defensive midfielder

Team information
- Current team: Panetolikos
- Number: 8

Youth career
- 2014–2018: Xanthi

Senior career*
| Years | Team | Apps | (Gls) |
| 2018–2022 | Xanthi | 53 | (2) |
| 2022–2024 | Panserraikos | 42 | (4) |
| 2024–2026 | PAOK | 8 | (0) |
| 2026– | Panetolikos | 1 | (0) |

International career^{‡}
| 2017 | Greece U16 | 4 | (0) |
| 2017–2018 | Greece U17 | 7 | (3) |
| 2019 | Greece U19 | 3 | (0) |
| 2021–2022 | Greece U21 | 6 | (0) |
- * Club domestic league appearances and goals as of 20 September 2026 ‡ National team caps and goals as of 25 March 2022

Konstantinos Thymianis (Greek: Κωνσταντίνος Θυμιάνης; born 28 February 2001) is a Greek professional footballer who plays as a defensive midfielder for Super League club Panetolikos.

== Club career ==
=== Xanthi ===
On 26 September 2018, Thymianis made his professional debut against OFI in the Greek Cup.

=== Panserraikos ===
On 14 September 2022, he joined Panserraikos on a two-year contract.

== Career statistics ==
As of 10 April 2025

| Club | Season | League | | | Cup | | Continental | | Total | |
| Club | Season | Division | Apps | Goals | Apps | Goals | Apps | Goals | Apps | Goals |
|---|---|---|---|---|---|---|---|---|---|---|
| Xanthi | 2018–19 | Super League Greece | 2 | 0 | 2 | 0 | — | | 4 | 0 |
| Xanthi | 2019–20 | Super League Greece | 5 | 0 | 1 | 0 | — | | 6 | 0 |
| Xanthi | 2020–21 | Super League Greece 2 | 21 | 1 | 0 | 0 | — | | 21 | 1 |
| Xanthi | 2021–22 | Super League Greece 2 | 25 | 1 | 1 | 0 | — | | 26 | 1 |
| Xanthi | Total | | 53 | 2 | 4 | 0 | — | | 57 | 2 |
| Panserraikos | 2022–23 | Super League Greece 2 | 24 | 0 | 4 | 0 | — | | 28 | 0 |
| Panserraikos | 2023–24 | Super League Greece | 18 | 4 | 4 | 0 | — | | 22 | 4 |
| Panserraikos | Total | | 42 | 4 | 8 | 0 | — | | 50 | 4 |
| PAOK | 2024-25 | Super League Greece | 3 | 0 | 2 | 0 | 1 | 0 | 6 | 0 |
| Career total | | | 98 | 6 | 14 | 0 | 1 | 0 | 113 | 6 |
