= Joan Sastre (footballer) =

Spanish footballer

Personal information
- Full name: Joan Sastre Vanrell
- Date of birth: 30 April 1997 (age 29)
- Place of birth: Porreres, Spain
- Height: 1.74 m (5 ft 9 in)
- Position: Right-back

Team information
- Current team: APOEL
- Number: 25

Youth career
- 2009–2014: Mallorca

Senior career*
Years	Team	Apps	(Gls)
2014–2017	Mallorca B	58	(0)
2015–2022	Mallorca	109	(4)
2022	→ PAOK (loan)	16	(2)
2022–2026	PAOK	77	(4)
2026–	APOEL	0	(0)

International career^{‡}
2015–2016	Spain U19	15	(0)
- * Club domestic league appearances and goals as of 15 July 2026 ‡ National team caps and goals as of 20 January 2016

Joan Sastre Vanrell (Catalan pronunciation: [ʒuˈan ˈsastɾə]; born 30 April 1997) is a Spanish professional footballer who plays as a right-back for Cypriot First Division club APOEL.

== Career ==
=== Mallorca ===
Born in Porreres, Majorca, Balearic Islands, Sastre graduated from local RCD Mallorca's youth system, and made his senior debuts with the reserves in the 2014–15 campaign, in Segunda División B. On 10 September 2015, he made his first team debut, starting in a 2–0 home loss against Huesca, for the season's Copa del Rey.

Ahead of the 2017–18 season, Sastre was definitely promoted to the first team by new manager Vicente Moreno, with the side now in the third level. He scored his first senior goal on 10 December 2017, netting the equalizer in a 1–1 away draw against CF Badalona.

On 30 December 2017, Sastre renewed his contract with the Bermellones until 2020. He subsequently featured regularly as the club achieved two consecutive promotions, and further extended his deal until 2023 on 22 July 2019.

Sastre made his La Liga debut on 17 August 2019, starting in a 2–1 home win over SD Eibar. He shared the starting spot with Fran Gámez during the season, as Mallorca suffered relegation.

Sastre scored his first professional goal on 3 January 2021, netting his team's second in a 2–2 Segunda División away draw against Real Oviedo.

After Mallorca signed Pablo Maffeo from VfB Stuttgart, Joan was no more a first team player so in the winter transfer season they decided to loan him to PAOK on a six-month contract with a buy option for the following season.

==== Loan to PAOK ====
On 12 January 2022, PAOK officially announced the acquisition of Sastre from Mallorca on loan for the remainder of the season, with an option to buy. Sastre scored his first goal against Volos on his debut on 22 January 2022.

=== PAOK ===
In summer 2023, PAOK enabled the permanent buy-out option from Mallorca for €400,000.

=== APOEL ===
15 July 2026 – APOEL announced an agreement in principle to sign Spanish right-back Joan Sastre, subject to the successful completion of medical examinations.

== Career statistics ==
=== Club ===
As of match played 10 April 2025

Appearances and goals by club, season and competition
Club	Season	League			National cup (Note: Includes Copa del Rey, Greek Football Cup)		Continental		Other		Total	
Club	Season	Division	Apps	Goals	Apps	Goals	Apps	Goals	Apps	Goals	Apps	Goals
Mallorca B	2014–15	Segunda División B	6	0	—		—		—		6	0
Mallorca B	2015–16	Tercera División	29	0	—		—		2 (Note: Appearances in Tercera División promotion play-offs)	0	31	0
Mallorca B	2016–17	Segunda División B	23	0	—		—		—		23	0
Mallorca B	Total		58	0	—				2	0	60	0
Mallorca	2015–16	Segunda División	0	0	1	0	—		—		1	0
Mallorca	2017–18	Segunda División B	33	3	1	0	—		2 (Note: Appearances in Segunda División B promotion play-offs)	0	36	3
Mallorca	2018–19	Segunda División	25	0	1	0	—		4 (Note: Appearances in Segunda División promotion play-offs)	0	30	0
Mallorca	2019–20	La Liga	19	0	2	0	—		—		21	0
Mallorca	2020–21	Segunda División	32	1	0	0	—		—		32	1
Mallorca	2021–22	La Liga	7	0	2	0	—		—		9	0
Mallorca	Total		116	4	7	0			6	0	129	4
PAOK (loan)	2021–22	Super League Greece	16	2	1	0	—		—		17	2
PAOK	2022–23	Super League Greece	24	0	6	1	1	0	—		31	1
PAOK	2023–24	Super League Greece	26	2	4	1	—		—		30	3
PAOK	2024-25	Super League Greece	18	1	3	0	7	0	—		28	1
PAOK	2025-26	Super League Greece	0	0	0	0	0	0	0	0	0	0
PAOK	Total		84	5	14	2	8	0	—		106	7
APOEL	2026–27	Cyprus First Division	0	0	0	0	0	0	0	0	0	0
Total			0	0	0	0	0	0	0	0	0	0
Career total			258	9	21	2	8	0	8	0	295	11

== Honours ==
PAOK

- Super League Greece: 2023–24
