= 2022–23 PAOK FC season =

PAOK
2022–23 season
- President: Ivan Savvidis
- Manager: Răzvan Lucescu
- Stadium: Toumba Stadium
- Super League 1: 4th
- Greek Cup: Runners-up
- UEFA Europa Conference League: Second qualifying round
- Top goalscorer: League: Nélson Oliveira; Khaled Narey; Brandon Thomas; Andrija Živković(7 goals each); All: Brandon Thomas (12)
- Highest home attendance: 23,585 vs Olympiacos (5 February 2023)
- Lowest home attendance: 7,540 vs Volos (9 April 2023)
- Average home league attendance: 13,185
- Biggest win: Lamia 1–5 PAOK; PAOK 6–0 Ionikos
- Biggest defeat: AEK Athens 4—0 PAOK; Olympiacos 3—1 PAOK
- All statistics correct as of 24 May 2023.

The 2022–23 PAOK FC season is the club's 97th season in existence and the club's 64th consecutive season in the top flight of Greek football. In addition to the domestic league, PAOK are participating in this season's editions of the Greek Cup and in the Europa Conference League. The season covers the period from 21 July 2022 to 30 June 2023.

== Coaching staff ==
Position	Staff
Head coach	(Romania) Răzvan Lucescu
Assistant Coach	(Italy) Cristiano Bacci
Goalkeeping Coach	(Portugal) Jose Moreira
Head Fitness Coach	(Italy) Matteo Spatafora
Fitness coach	(Italy) Paolo Castorina
Rehabilitation Coach	(Greece) Georgios Tsonakas

Last updated: 26 May 2021

== Players ==
=== Squad ===
As of 29 January 2023

Note: Flags indicate national team as defined under FIFA eligibility rules; some limited exceptions apply. Players may hold more than one non-FIFA nationality.

No.	Pos.	Nation	Player
2	DF	GRE	Giannis Kargas
3	DF	NOR	Ivan Näsberg
4	DF	ISL	Sverrir Ingi Ingason (vice-captain)
5	DF	GRE	Giannis Michailidis
7	MF	MAR	Omar El Kaddouri
8	MF	BRA	Douglas Augusto
9	FW	POR	Nélson Oliveira
10	MF	AUT	Thomas Murg
11	FW	BRA	Taison
14	MF	SRB	Andrija Živković
16	DF	POL	Tomasz Kędziora
18	GK	SRB	Živko Živković
19	DF	GRE	Lefteris Lyratzis
20	DF	POR	Vieirinha (captain)
21	MF	SUR	Diego Biseswar

No.	Pos.	Nation	Player
22	MF	AUT	Stefan Schwab
23	DF	ESP	Joan Sastre
24	DF	GRE	Marios Tsaousis
26	MF	POR	Tiago Dantas (on loan from Benfica)
27	MF	SLO	Jasmin Kurtić (on loan from Parma)
31	MF	POR	André Ricardo
42	GK	CRO	Dominik Kotarski
50	MF	POR	Filipe Soares
55	DF	POR	Rafa Soares
59	DF	GRE	Konstantinos Koulierakis
64	GK	GRE	Christos Talichmanidis
65	MF	GRE	Giannis Konstantelias
71	FW	ESP	Brandon Thomas
77	FW	GER	Khaled Narey

== Transfers ==
=== In ===
No.	Pos	Player	Transferred from	Fee	Date	Source	
	MF	(Georgia (country)) Nika Ninua	(Greece) Lamia	Loan return	1 July 2022		
65	MF	(Greece) Giannis Konstantelias	(Belgium) Eupen	Loan return	1 July 2022		
97	FW	(Greece) Lazaros Lamprou	(Greece) OFI	Loan return	1 July 2022		
	MF	(Greece) Georgios Vrakas	(Greece) Levadiakos	Loan return	1 July 2022		
	MF	(Greece) Pavlos Logaras	(Greece) Volos	Loan return	1 July 2022		
30	MF	(Uruguay) Nicolás Quagliata	(Uruguay) Wanderers	1,8 mio	3 June 2022		
23	DF	(Spain) Joan Sastre	(Spain) Mallorca	400K	3 June 2022		
55	MF	(Portugal) Rafa Soares	(Portugal) Vitória Guimarães	Free transfer	7 June 2022		
2	DF	(Greece) Giannis Kargas	(Greece) PAS Giannina	200K	25 June 2022		
26	MF	(Portugal) Tiago Dantas	(Portugal) Benfica	Loan	25 June 2022		
42	GK	(Croatia) Dominik Kotarski	(Netherlands) Ajax	2,0 mio	27 June 2022		
31	MF	(Portugal) André Ricardo	(Portugal) Famalicão	Free transfer	27 June 2022		
71	FW	(Spain) Brandon Thomas	(Spain) Málaga	Free transfer	14 July 2022		
77	FW	(Germany) Khaled Narey	(Germany) Fortuna Düsseldorf	Free transfer	17 July 2022		
44	DF	(Italy) Raul Morichelli	(Italy) Roma	Free transfer + resale-clause	27 July 2022		
3	DF	(Norway) Ivan Näsberg	(Norway) Vålerenga	Free transfer	2 August 2022		
11	FW	(Brazil) Taison	(Brazil) Internacional	Free transfer	14 January 2023		
16	DF	(Poland) Tomasz Kędziora	(Ukraine) Dynamo Kyiv	Loan	29 January 2023		
Total							€4,400,000

=== Out ===
No.	Pos	Player	Transferred to	Fee	Date	Source
47	FW	(Nigeria) Chuba Akpom	(England) Middlesbrough	End of loan	30 June 2022	
16	DF	(Brazil) Sidcley	(Ukraine) Dynamo Kyiv	End of loan	30 June 2022	
28	FW	(Romania) Alexandru Mitriță	(United States) New York City	End of loan	30 June 2022	
31	GK	(Greece) Alexandros Paschalakis	Free agent	End of contract	30 June 2022	
15	DF	(Spain) José Ángel Crespo	(Cyprus) APOEL	End of contract	30 June 2022	
5	DF	(Cape Verde) Fernando Varela	(Portugal) Casa Pia	End of contract	30 June 2022	
29	FW	(Croatia) Antonio Čolak	(Scotland) Rangers	2,4 mio	7 July 2022	
	FW	(Greece) Georgios Vrakas	(Greece) Levadiakos	Loan	14 July 2022	
68	MF	(Greece) Panagiotis Tzimas	(Greece) PAS Giannina	Loan	20 July 2022	
6	DF	(Albania) Enea Mihaj	(Portugal) Famalicão	200K + 50% resale-clause	7 July 2022	
13	DF	(Brazil) Lucas Taylor	(Ukraine) Shakhtar Donetsk	Loan	23 August 2022	
97	FW	(Greece) Lazaros Lamprou	(Netherlands) Excelsior	Free transfer	31 August 2022	
51	MF	(Greece) Theocharis Tsingaras	(France) Toulouse	Loan	1 September 2022	
70	FW	(Greece) Georgios Koutsias	(Greece) Volos	Loan	15 September 2022	
70	FW	(Greece) Georgios Koutsias	(United States) Chicago Fire	2,5 mio $ + 15% resale-clause	28 February 2023	
30	MF	(Uruguay) Nicolás Quagliata	(Brazil) Cuiabá	Loan	10 March 2023	
Total						€4,900,000

Transferfee for Koutsias is about 2,3 in €.

== Pre-season and other friendlies ==
Win Draw Loss

Wednesday, 29 June 2022 Friendly	Go Ahead Eagles	0–4	PAOK	Terwolde
20:00 EET, UTC+03:00			Oliveira 29'; 47' (o.g.); André Ricardo 63'; Konstantelias 73'	Stadium: SV Terwolde; Attendance: N/A; Referee: Ingmar Oostrom

Saturday, 2 July 2022 Friendly	FC Groningen	2–1	PAOK	Wenum-Wiesel
16:30 EET, UTC+03:00	78', 85'		Konstantelias 49'	Stadium: Sportpark Wiesel; Attendance: N/A; Referee: Clay Ruperti

Wednesday, 6 July 2022 Friendly	AZ	2–2	PAOK	Wenum-Wiesel
20:00 EET, UTC+03:00	Pavlidis 27'; Griffith 72'		A. Živković 5'; Kargas 13'	Stadium: Sportpark Wiesel; Attendance: behind closed doors Referee: Rob Dieperink

Saturday, 9 July 2022 Friendly	PAOK	1–0	Standard Liège	Garderen
17:00 EET, UTC+03:00	Koutsias 37'	Report		Stadium: De Westeneng; Attendance: behind closed doors

Friday, 15 July 2022 Friendly	PAOK	4–0	Panetolikos	Thessaloniki
17:00 EET, UTC+03:00	Koutsias 30', 45'; Kurtić 39'; Schwab 82' (pen.)			Stadium: Nea Mesimvria (PAOK training-centre); Attendance: behind closed doors

Saturday, 13 August 2022 Friendly	PAOK	3–1	Volos	Thessaloniki
19:30 EET, UTC+03:00	Biseswar 20'; Oliveira 54'; Koutsias 90+' (pen.)		65'	Stadium: Toumba Stadium; Attendance: behind closed doors

Monday, 28 November 2022 Friendly	PAOK	4–1	Ashdod	Larnaca
14:30 EET, UTC+02:00	Filipe Soares 10'; Biseswar 27'; Brandon 34'; Selimaj (yellow card) 77'; Konstantelias 79'		29'	Stadium: GSZ Stadium; Attendance: ? Referee: Marios Nikolaou

Thursday, 1 December 2022 Friendly	PAOK	3–0	AEL Limassol	Limassol
18:30 EET, UTC+02:00	Douglas Augusto 10'; Oliveira 32'; Biseswar 73'			Stadium: Tsirion Stadium; Attendance: ?

Monday, 5 December 2022 Friendly	PAOK	4–1	Aris Limassol	Larnaca
18:00 EET, UTC+02:00	Douglas Augusto 33'; Brandon 57'; Schwab 63'; Narey 77'		88'	Stadium: Antonis Papadopoulos Stadium; Attendance: ?

Saturday, 25 March 2022 Friendly	PAOK	3–0	Farul Constanța	Thessaloniki
18:00 EET, UTC+02:00	Brandon Thomas 35'; Bradonjić 87'; Gordeziani 90+1'			Stadium: Toumba Stadium

== Competitions ==
=== Overview ===
Competition	First match	Last match	Starting round	Record							
Competition	First match	Last match	Starting round	Pld	W	D	L	GF	GA	GD	Win %
Super League Greece	20 August 2022	14 May 2023	Matchday 1	36	19	10	7	57	32	+25	52.78
Greek Football Cup	14 December 2022	24 May 2023	Round of 16	7	4	2	1	13	5	+8	57.14
UEFA Europa Conference League	21 July 2022	28 July 2022	Second qualifying round	2	0	1	1	1	3	−2	0.00
Total				45	23	13	9	71	40	+31	51.11

Source: Soccerway

=== Managerial statistics ===
Head coach	From	To	Record							
Head coach	From	To	G	W	D	L	GF	GA	GD	Win %
(Romania) Răzvan Lucescu	18 June 2022	Present	45	23	13	9	71	40	+31	51.11

Last updated: 24 May 2023

=== Super League Greece ===
==== League table ====
Pos	Team	Pld	W	D	L	GF	GA	GD	Pts	Qualification or relegation
2	AEK Athens	26	19	2	5	51	14	+37	59	Qualification for the Play-off round
3	Olympiacos	26	16	8	2	53	14	+39	56	Qualification for the Play-off round
4	PAOK	26	15	9	2	43	15	+28	54	Qualification for the Play-off round
5	Aris	26	12	4	10	38	24	+14	40	Qualification for the Play-off round
6	Volos	26	11	6	9	31	38	−7	39	Qualification for the Play-off round

Source: Super League Greece
Rules for classification: 1) Points; 2) Head-to-head points; 3) Head-to-head goal difference; 4) Goal difference; 5) Goals scored; 6) Play-offs (neutral ground).
(Note: Criterion 6 is only used if needed to decide champion, teams for relegation or teams for UEFA competitions).

==== Matches ====
Saturday, 20 August 2022 1	PAOK	1–0	Panetolikos	Thessaloniki
21:45 EET, UTC+02:00	Brandon 7'			Stadium: Toumba Stadium; Attendance: 8,715; Referee: Angelos Evangelou (Athens); Man of the Match: Khaled Narey

Sunday, 28 August 2022 2	PAOK	2–1	Atromitos	Thessaloniki
21:45 EET, UTC+02:00	Kurtić 12' (pen.); Felipe Soares (yellow card) 88'; Narey 90+6'		Tzovaras 90+2'	Stadium: Toumba Stadium; Attendance: 10,490; Referee: Athanasios Tzilos (Larissa); Man of the Match: Khaled Narey

Sunday, 4 September 2022 3	Aris	0–0	PAOK	Thessaloniki
21:30 EET, UTC+02:00	(penalty missed) 53'; (red card) 90+6'		(yellow card) 22' Tsaousis; (yellow card) 90+2' Ingason; (yellow card) 90+3' Kurtić; (red card) 90+6' El Kaddouri	Stadium: Kleanthis Vikelidis; Attendance: 12,565; Referee: Luís Godinho (Portugal); Man of the Match: Dominik Kotarski

Monday, 12 September 2022 4	PAOK	1–0	Lamia	Thessaloniki
19:00 EET, UTC+02:00	Kurtić 43', (yellow card) 45+2'; Filipe Soares (yellow card) 90+1'		(red card) 90+15'	Stadium: Toumba Stadium; Attendance: 10,134; Referee: Petros Tsagarakis; Man of the Match: Dantas
Note: Schwab was goalkeeper in the dying seconds of the match after Kotarski was injured and no more subs were allowed.

Sunday, 18 September 2022 5	OFI	1–1	PAOK	Heraklion
19:00 EET, UTC+03:00	90+13'		10' Narey; (yellow card) 13' Vieirinha; (yellow card) 76' Lyratzis; (yellow card) 82' Brandon	Stadium: Theodoros Vardinogiannis Stadium; Attendance: 3,788; Referee: Anastasios Sidiropoulos

Sunday, 2 October 2022 6	PAOK	1–2	Panathinaikos	Thessaloniki
21:30 EET, UTC+03:00	Oliveira 18', (yellow card) 43'; Kotarski (yellow card) 72'; Kurtić (yellow card) 75'		51', 73' (pen.)	Stadium: Toumba Stadium; Attendance: 21,074; Referee: Julian Weinberger (Austria)

Sunday, 9 October 2022 7	Levadiakos	1–1	PAOK	Livadeia
16:30 EET, UTC+03:00	90+3'		(yellow card) 39' Kurtić; 73' Narey; (red card) 90+8' A. Živković	Stadium: Levadia Municipal Stadium; Attendance: 2,043; Referee: Evangelos Manouhos

Monday, 17 October 2022 8	Olympiacos	1–2	PAOK	Piraeus
20:00 EET, UTC+03:00	37'		8' (o.g.); (yellow card) 39' El Kaddouri; (yellow card) 55' Douglas Augusto; 56' Narey; (yellow card) 89' Dantas; (yellow card) 90+1' Kotarski; (yellow card) 90+6' Schwab	Stadium: Karaiskakis Stadium; Attendance: 25,100; Referee: Andris Treimanis (Latvia)

Sunday, 23 October 2022 9	PAOK	2–2	Asteras Tripolis	Thessaloniki
19:30 EET, UTC+02:00	A. Živković (yellow card) 53'; Kurtić (yellow card) 56', (goal) 81' (pen.); Oliveira 90+7'		45+2', 54' (pen.)	Stadium: Toumba Stadium; Attendance: 12,477; Referee: Stefanos Koumbarakis

Sunday, 30 October 2022 10	AEK Athens	2–0	PAOK	Nea Filadelfeia
19:30 EET, UTC+02:00	36', 61'		(yellow card) 41' Dantas; (yellow card) 51' Oliveira; (yellow card) 56' Sastre	Stadium: Agia Sophia Stadium; Attendance: 31,100; Referee: Daniel Stefański (Poland)

Saturday, 5 November 2022 11	PAOK	2–0	PAS Giannina	Thessaloniki
EET, UTC+02:00	Ingason 8'; Schwab 10' (pen.); Koulierakis (yellow card) 49'; El Kaddouri (yellow card) 52'; A. Živković (yellow card) 57'; Sastre (yellow card) 68'			Stadium: Toumba Stadium; Attendance: 7,800; Referee: Konstantinos Perakis

Thursday, 10 November 2022 12	Ionikos	0–3	PAOK	Nikaia
21:30 EET, UTC+02:00			27' Filipe Soares; 34' Oliveira; 57' Douglas Augusto	Stadium: Neapolis Public Stadium; Attendance: 1,111; Referee: Petros Tsagarakis (Chania)

Sunday, 13 November 2022 13	PAOK	3–0	Volos	Thessaloniki
21:30 EET, UTC+02:00	Oliveira 28' (pen.), (yellow card) 51'; A. Živković 30'; Douglas Augusto 62' (pen.); Biseswar (yellow card) 83'		(penalty missed) 44'	Stadium: Toumba Stadium; Attendance: 9,880; Referee: Andreas Gamaris (Athens)

Thursday, 22 December 2022 14	Panetolikos	0–2	PAOK	Agrinio
19:30 EET, UTC+02:00			45+5' Oliveira; (yellow card) 45+6', (goal) 86' Douglas Augusto; 61' Rafa Soares; (yellow card) 74' Konstantelias; (yellow card) 82' Schwab	Stadium: Panetolikos Stadium; Referee: Anastasios Sidiropoulos

Wednesday, 28 december 2022 15	Atromitos	1–1	PAOK	Peristeri
20:00 EET, UTC+02:00	72'		26' Oliveira; (yellow card) 54' Koulierakis; (yellow card) 80' Brandon	Stadium: Peristeri Stadium; Referee: Aristomenis Koutsiaftis

Wednesday, 4 January 2023 16	PAOK	1–0	Aris	Thessaloniki
20:00 EET, UTC+02:00	Schwab (penalty missed) 22', (yellow card) 90+5'; Douglas Augusto (yellow card) 30'; A. Živković (yellow card) 36'; Ingason 45+1'; Kotarski (yellow card) 90'			Stadium: Toumba Stadium; Attendance: 20,756; Referee: Tamás Bognár (Hungary)

Saturday, 7 January 2023 17	Lamia	0–3	PAOK	Lamia
19:30 EET, UTC+02:00			13' Oliveira; 27' Dantas; 58' A. Živković	Stadium: Lamia Municipal Stadium; Attendance: 2,040; Referee: Stefanos Koumbarakis

Saturday, 14 January 2023 18	PAOK	0–0	OFI	Thessaloniki
20:00 EET, UTC+02:00	Ingason (yellow card) 86'			Stadium: Toumba Stadium; Attendance: 9,830; Referee: Dimitris Karantonis

Sunday, 22 January 2023 19	Panathinaikos	0–3	PAOK	Athens
19:30 EET, UTC+02:00	(yellow card) 81' (yellow-red card) 90+1'		(yellow card) 42' Douglas Augusto; 44' (o.g.); (yellow card) 45+2' Koulierakis; 46' A. Živković; (yellow card) 49' Sastre; 52' Konstantelias; (yellow card) 65' Ingason	Stadium: Leoforos Alexandras Stadium; Attendance: 13,612; Referee: Aleksei Kulbakov (Belarus)

Monday, 30 January 2023 20	PAOK	3–2	Levadiakos	Thessaloniki
18:00 EET, UTC+02:00	Dantas 10', 45+4'; Kotarski (yellow card) 12'; Koulierakis 61'; Narey (yellow card) 69'; Konstantelias (yellow card) 76'		15' (pen.), 66'	Stadium: Toumba Stadium; Attendance: 9,268; Referee: Aristotelis Diamantopoulos (Arcadia)

Sunday, 5 February 2023 21	PAOK	0–0	Olympiacos	Thessaloniki
20:30 EET, UTC+02:00	Douglas Augusto (yellow card) 45'; Sastre (yellow card) 78'; Rafa Soares (yellow card) 90+2'			Stadium: Toumba Stadium; Attendance: 23,585; Referee: Ivan Kružliak (Slovakia)

Monday, 13 February 2023 22	Asteras Tripolis	2–2	PAOK	Tripoli
18:00 EET, UTC+02:00	90', 90+4'		6', (yellow card) 63' Näsberg; 82' Brandon; (yellow card) 90+2' Z. Živković	Stadium: Theodoros Kolokotronis Stadium; Attendance: 939; Referee: Petros Tsangarakis (Chania

Sunday, 19 February 2023 23	PAOK	2–0	AEK Athens	Thessaloniki
20:30 EET, UTC+02:00	Narey 14', (yellow card) 79'; Koulierakis 62'			Stadium: Toumba Stadium; Attendance: 18,410; Referee: Espen Eskås (Norway)

Saturday, 25 February 2023 24	PAS Giannina	0–0	PAOK	Ioannina
19:00 EET, UTC+02:00				Stadium: Zosimades Stadium; Attendance: 1,555; Referee: Angelos Evangelou (Athens)

Sunday, 5 March 2023 25	PAOK	6–0	Ionikos	Thessaloniki
20:30 EET, UTC+02:00	2' (o.g.); Konstantelias 24'; Brandon 28'; A. Živković 30'; Kędziora 54'; Tzimas 90+1'		(yellow card) 44' (yellow-red card) 48'	Stadium: Toumba Stadium; Attendance: 8,257; Referee: Anastasios Sidiropoulos

Sunday, 12 March 2023 26	Volos	0–1	PAOK	Volos
19:00 EET, UTC+03:00			30' Brandon; (yellow card) 49' Sastre; (yellow card) 87' Rafa Soares	Stadium: Panthessaliko Stadium; Attendance: 4,036; Referee: Dimitris Maloutas (Imathia)

==== Results summary ====
Overall								Home						Away					
Pld	W	D	L	GF	GA	GD	Pts	W	D	L	GF	GA	GD	W	D	L	GF	GA	GD
26	15	9	2	43	15	+28	54	9	3	1	24	7	+17	6	6	1	19	8	+11

==== Results by round ====
Round	1	2	3	4	5	6	7	8	9	10	11	12	13	14	15	16	17	18	19	20	21	22	23	24	25	26
Ground	H	H	A	H	A	H	A	A	H	A	H	A	H	A	A	H	A	H	A	H	H	A	H	A	H	A
Result	W	W	D	W	D	L	D	W	D	L	W	W	W	W	D	W	W	D	W	W	D	D	W	D	W	W
Position	5	2	3	2	2	5	5	4	5	5	5	5	3	3	3	3	3	4	3	3	3	4	4	4	4	4

A = Away; H = Home; W = Win; D = Draw; L = Loss

== Play-off round ==
The top six teams from Regular season will meet twice (10 matches per team) for places in 2023–24 UEFA Champions League, 2023–24 UEFA Europa League and 2023–24 UEFA Europa Conference League as well as deciding the league champion.

Pos	Team	Pld	W	D	L	GF	GA	GD	Pts	Qualification
1	AEK Athens (C)	36	26	5	5	69	17	+52	83	Qualification for the Champions League third qualifying round
2	Panathinaikos	36	23	9	4	47	16	+31	78	Qualification for the Champions League second qualifying round
3	Olympiacos	36	21	10	5	70	24	+46	73	Qualification for the Europa League third qualifying round
4	PAOK	36	19	10	7	57	32	+25	67	Qualification for the Europa Conference League second qualifying round
5	Aris	36	15	6	15	55	41	+14	51	Qualification for the Europa Conference League second qualifying round
6	Volos	36	11	7	18	35	66	−31	40	

Source: Super League Greece
Rules for classification: 1) Points; 2) Head-to-head points (Regular season and play-off); 3) Head-to-head goal difference (Regular season and play-off); 4) Regular season position.
(C) Champions

=== Results summary ===
Overall								Home						Away					
Pld	W	D	L	GF	GA	GD	Pts	W	D	L	GF	GA	GD	W	D	L	GF	GA	GD
10	4	1	5	14	17	−3	13	2	0	3	8	8	0	2	1	2	6	9	−3

=== Results by round ===
Round	1	2	3	4	5	6	7	8	9	10
Ground	A	H	A	H	H	A	H	A	A	H
Result	W	L	L	W	L	L	W	D	W	L
Position	4	4	4	4	4	4	4	4	4	4

Updated to match(es) played on 14 May 2023. Source: League matches
A = Away; H = Home; W = Win; D = Draw; L = Loss

=== Matches ===
Sunday, 19 March 2023 1	Aris	1–2	PAOK	Thessaloniki
19:00 EET, UTC+02:00	12'		(yellow card) 47', (goal) 68' (pen.) Schwab; 73' A. Živković; (yellow card) 89' Konstantelias; (yellow card) 90' Kargas	Stadium: Kleanthis Vikelidis Stadium; Attendance: 11,165; Referee: Mohammed Al-Hakim (Sweden)

Sunday, 2 April 2023 2	PAOK	0–1	AEK Athens	Thessaloniki
19:30 EET, UTC+03:00	Sastre (yellow card) 3'; Douglas Augusto (yellow card) 9'; Oliveira (yellow card) 61'; Taison (yellow card) 90+4'		80'	Stadium: Toumba Stadium; Attendance: 21,771; Referee: Aleksei Kulbakov (Belarus)

Wednesday, 5 April 2023 3	Olympiacos	3–1	PAOK	Piraeus
21:00 EET, UTC+03:00	59', 78', 87' (pen.)		(yellow card) 10' Koulierakis; 22' Brandon; (yellow card) 46' A. Živković	Stadium: Karaiskakis Stadium; Attendance: 25,016; Referee: François Letexier (France)

Sunday, 9 April 2023 4	PAOK	4–2	Volos	Thessaloniki
20:30 EET, UTC+03:00	6' Ingason; 16', 27' Narey; 45+' Dantas		58', 88'	Stadium: Toumba Stadium; Attendance: 7,540; Referee: Vasilis Fotias

Sunday, 23 April 2023 5	PAOK	1–2	Panathinaikos	Thessaloniki
20:00 EET, UTC+03:00	Dantas (yellow card) 48', Kargas (yellow card) 60'; Douglas Augusto 85', (yellow card) 90+10'; Taison (yellow card) 90+1'; El Kaddouri (yellow card) 90+3'		38', 90+1' (pen.)	Stadium: Toumba Stadium; Attendance: 12,880; Referee: Daniel Siebert (Germany)

Wednesday, 26 April 2023 6	AEK Athens	4–0	PAOK	Nea Filadelfeia
21:00 EET, UTC+03:00	21', 24', 77', 86'		(red card) 10' Kargas; (yellow card) 36' Schwab	Stadium: Agia Sophia Stadium; Referee: Tobias Stieler (Germany)

Sunday, 30 April 2023 7	PAOK	3–2	Aris	Thessaloniki
20:00 EET, UTC+03:00	Taison 56', (yellow card) 90+3'; Schwab 62' (pen.), (yellow card) 64'; Brandon (yellow card) 64'; Joan Sastre (yellow card) 73'; A. Živković 78', (yellow card) 79'		45', 70', (yellow card) 64' (yellow-red card) 90+3'	Stadium: Toumba Stadium; Attendance: 10,100; Referee: Aliyar Aghayev (Azerbaijan)

Wednesday, 3 May 2023 8	Panathinaikos	1–1	PAOK	Athens
20:00 EET, UTC+03:00	9', Mancini (red card) 84'		60' Brandon; (yellow card) 69' A. Živković	Stadium: Leoforos Alexandras (Athens); Attendance: 13.000; Referee: Craig Pawson (England)

Monday, 8 May 2023 9	Volos	0–2	PAOK	Volos
21:00 EET, UTC+03:00	(red card) 45+2'		28' A. Živković; 57' Brandon	Stadium: Panthessaliko Stadium; Referee: Christos Vergetis

Sunday, 14 May 2023 10	PAOK	0–1	Olympiacos	Thessaloniki
20:00 EET, UTC+03:00	Filipe Soares (yellow card) 81'; Taison (yellow card) 89'		33'	Stadium: Toumba Stadium; Attendance: 15,535; Referee: Angelos Evangelou (Athens)

=== Greek Cup ===
==== Round of 16 ====
Wednesday, 14 December 2022 1st leg	Kalamata	0–2	PAOK	Kalamata
15:00 EET, UTC+02:00			26' (pen.) (yellow card) 59' Oliveira; (yellow card) 45+1' Sastre; (yellow card) 75' Douglas Augusto; 78' Brandon	Stadium: Kalamata Municipal Stadium; Referee: Stavros Tsimenteridis

Tuesday, 10 January 2023 2nd leg	PAOK	2–0 (4–0 agg.)	Kalamata	Thessaloniki
21:00 EET, UTC+02:00	Brandon 11', 13'; Narey (yellow card) 63'			Stadium: Toumba Stadium; Referee: Alexandros Katsikogiannis

==== Quarter-finals ====
Wednesday, 18 January 2023 1st leg	PAOK	2–0	Panathinaikos	Thessaloniki
20:30 EET, UTC+02:00	Douglas Augusto (yellow card) 13'; Brandon 53'; Narey (yellow card) 66'; Taison 72'			Stadium: Toumba Stadium; Referee: Slavko Vinčić (Slovenia)

Thursday, 26 January 2023 2nd leg	Panathinaikos	1–1 (1–3 agg.)	PAOK	Ampelokipoi
19:30 EET, UTC+02:00	18'		(yellow card) 43', (goal) 78' (pen.) Oliveira; (yellow card) 45+3' Douglas Augusto; (yellow card) 48' Rafa Soares; (yellow card) 67' Schwab; (yellow card) 86' Konstantelias; (red card) 89' Brandon; (yellow card) 90+5' Taison	Stadium: Leoforos Alexandras Stadium; Referee: Petri Viljanen (Finland)

==== Semi-finals ====
Wednesday, 8 March 2023 1st leg	Lamia	1–5	PAOK	Lamia
19:00 EET, UTC+02:00	86'		1' Narey; 25' Konstantelias; 62' Douglas Augusto; 67' Brandon; 69' Sastre; (yellow card) 85' El Kaddouri	Stadium: Lamia Municipal Stadium; Attendance: ? Referee: Christos Vergetis
Note: This match was scheduled for 9 February 2023 but was postponed because there was snow on the pitch. After that the match was rescheduled for 1 March but was postponed because of the train crash at Tempi.

Thursday, 13 April 2023 2nd leg	PAOK	1–1 (6–2 agg.)	Lamia	Thessaloniki
17:00 EET, UTC+03:00	Schwab 25' (pen.); Kargas (yellow card) 26'; Koulierakis (yellow card) 90+3'		51'	Stadium: Toumba; Attendance: approx. 7,250; Referee: Spiridon Zabalas
Note: this match was scheduled for 8 March 2023 but was postponed because the first leg was postponed to this day.

==== Final ====
Wednesday, 24 May 2023 Greek Cup Final	AEK Athens	2–0	PAOK	Volos
20:30 EET, UTC+03:00	(red card) 6', (goal) 26', 90+2'		(yellow card) 40' Schwab; (yellow card) 49' Douglas Augusto	Stadium: Panthessaliko Stadium; Attendance: no fans allowed Referee: Felix Brych (Germany)
Note: no fans allowed

=== UEFA Europa Conference League ===
==== Second qualifying round ====
21 July 2022 First leg	Levski Sofia (Bulgaria)	2–0	(Greece) PAOK	Sofia, Bulgaria
20:00 EEST	Welton Felipe 1', (yellow card) 28'; Bari 19'; Galchev (yellow card) 75'	Report	(yellow card) 56' Živković; (yellow card) 81' Kurtić; (yellow card) 84' Douglas Augusto; (yellow card) 90' Joan Sastre	Stadium: Vivacom Arena; Attendance: 14,123; Referee: Jérémie Pignard (France); Man of the Match: Koutsias

28 July 2022 Second leg	PAOK (Greece)	1–1 (1–3 agg.)	(Bulgaria) Levski Sofia	Thessaloniki, Greece
20:30 EEST	Kurtić (yellow card) 13'; Dantas 56'; Kargas (yellow card) 63'; Douglas Augusto (yellow card) 64' (yellow-red card) 72'; Vieirinha (yellow card) 80' (yellow-red card) 81'; Ingason (yellow card) 86'	Report	25' Ronaldo; (yellow card) 72' Bari; (yellow card) 77' Krastev; (yellow card) 89' Van der Kaap	Stadium: Toumba Stadium; Attendance: 15,000; Referee: César Soto Grado (Spain); Man of the Match: No poll

== Statistics ==
=== Squad statistics ===
The squad was informed and the official page of PAOK FC.

As of 24 May 2023

Appearances denote players in the starting lineup, with the numbers in parentheses denoting appearances as substitute.

No.	Name	Super League		Greek Cup		Europa Conference League		Total	
No.	Name	Apps	Goals	Apps	Goals	Apps	Goals	Apps	Goals
Goalkeepers
18	(Serbia) Živko Živković	2	0	2	0	0	0	4	0
42	(Croatia) Dominik Kotarski	34	0	5	0	2	0	41	0
Defenders
2	(Greece) Giannis Kargas	7 (1)	0	3	0	2	0	12 (1)	0
4	(Iceland) Sverrir Ingason	30	3	4	0	2	0	36	3
3	(Norway) Ivan Näsberg	8 (4)	1	2	0	0	0	10 (4)	1
19	(Greece) Lefteris Lyratzis	12 (2)	0	1 (1)	0	1	0	14 (3)	0
23	(Spain) Joan Sastre	17 (7)	0	6	1	1	0	24 (7)	1
24	(Greece) Marios Tsaousis	6 (3)	0	0	0	0	0	6 (3)	0
55	(Portugal) Rafa Soares	26	0	4 (1)	0	2	0	32 (1)	0
59	(Greece) Konstantinos Koulierakis	24 (1)	2	5 (1)	0	0	0	29 (2)	2
75	(Albania) Ermis Selimaj	0	0	0 (1)	0	0	0	0 (1)	0
16	(Poland) Tomasz Kędziora	7 (1)	1	1 (1)	0	0	0	8 (2)	1
Midfielders
7	(Morocco) Omar El Kaddouri	9 (14)	0	0 (2)	0	0	0	9 (16)	0
10	(Austria) Thomas Murg	1 (3)	0	0 (1)	0	0	0	1 (4)	0
22	(Austria) Stefan Schwab	14 (17)	3	3 (4)	1	1 (1)	0	18 (22)	4
27	(Slovenia) Jasmin Kurtić	10	3	0	0	1 (1)	0	11 (1)	3
8	(Brazil) Douglas Augusto	29	4	5	0	2	0	36	4
20	(Portugal) Vieirinha	7 (8)	0	3 (3)	0	0 (1)	0	10 (12)	0
21	(Suriname) Diego Biseswar	4 (21)	0	2 (5)	0	0 (1)	0	6 (27)	0
50	(Portugal) Filipe Soares	5 (15)	1	3	0	0 (1)	0	8 (16)	1
26	(Portugal) Tiago Dantas	24 (8)	4	5	0	2	1	31 (8)	5
65	(Greece) Giannis Konstantelias	26 (4)	2	6	1	0 (1)	0	32 (5)	3
31	(Portugal) André Ricardo	0 (3)	0	0 (1)	0	0	0	0 (4)	0
Forwards
18	(Portugal) Nélson Oliveira	24 (8)	7	2 (2)	2	0	0	26 (10)	9
14	(Serbia) Andrija Živković	28 (5)	7	4 (2)	0	2	0	34 (7)	7
71	(Spain) Brandon Thomas	11 (18)	7	5 (2)	5	0 (1)	0	16 (21)	12
77	(Germany) Khaled Narey	26 (2)	7	6	1	1 (1)	0	33 (3)	8
45	(Greece) Vasilios Gordeziani	1 (1)	0	0	0	0	0	1 (1)	0
95	(Greece) Stefanos Tzimas	0 (4)	1	0 (3)	0	0	0	0 (7)	1
11	(Brazil) Taison	5 (9)	1	2 (3)	1	0	0	7 (12)	2
Players transferred out during the season
70	(Greece) Georgios Koutsias	0	0	0	0	1 (1)	0	1 (1)	0
30	(Uruguay) Nicolás Quagliata	0 (3)	0	0	0	2	0	2 (3)	0

=== Goalscorers ===
As of 24 May 2023

Rank	No.	Pos.	Player	Super League	Greek Cup	Europa Conference League	Total
1	71	FW	(Spain) Brandon	7	5	0	12
2	9	FW	(Portugal) Oliveira	7	2	0	9
3	77	FW	(Germany) Narey	7	1	0	8
4	14	FW	(Serbia) A. Živković	7	0	0	7
5	26	MF	(Portugal) Dantas	4	0	1	5
	8	MF	(Brazil) Douglas Augusto	4	1	0	5
7	22	MF	(Austria) Schwab	3	1	0	4
8	27	MF	(Slovenia) Kurtić	3	0	0	3
	65	MF	(Greece) Konstantelias	2	1	0	3
	4	DF	(Iceland) Ingason	3	0	0	3
11	59	DF	(Greece) Koulierakis	2	0	0	2
	11	FW	(Brazil) Taison	1	1	0	2
13	50	MF	(Portugal) F. Soares	1	0	0	1
	3	DF	(Norway) Näsberg	1	0	0	1
	16	DF	(Poland) Kędziora	1	0	0	1
	95	FW	(Greece) Tzimas	1	0	0	1
	23	DF	(Spain) Joan Sastre	0	1	0	1
Own goals				3	0	0	3
TOTAL				57	13	1	71

=== Clean sheets ===
As of 24 May 2023

Player	League	Cup	ECL	Total	Games played	Percentage
(Croatia) Dominik Kotarski	16	2	0	18	41	43,90%
(Serbia) Živko Živković	1	1	0	2	4	50,00%
Total	17	3	0	20	45	44,44%

=== Disciplinary record ===
As of 24 May 2023

S	P	N	Name	Super League			Greek Cup			Europa Conference League			Total		
S	P	N	Name	Yellow card	Yellow-red card	Red card	Yellow card	Yellow-red card	Red card	Yellow card	Yellow-red card	Red card	Yellow card	Yellow-red card	Red card
14	FW	(Serbia)	A. Živković	6	0	1	0	0	0	1	0	0	7	0	1
27	MF	(Slovenia)	Kurtić	5	0	0	0	0	0	2	0	0	7	0	0
8	MF	(Brazil)	Douglas Augusto	7	0	0	4	0	0	1	1	0	12	1	0
23	DF	(Spain)	Sastre	7	0	0	1	0	0	1	0	0	9	0	0
2	DF	(Greece)	Kargas	2	0	1	1	0	0	1	0	0	4	0	1
20	MF	(Portugal)	Vieirinha	1	0	0	0	0	0	0	1	0	1	1	0
4	DF	(Iceland)	Ingason	3	0	0	0	0	0	1	0	0	4	0	0
50	MF	(Portugal)	F. Soares	3	0	0	0	0	0	0	0	0	3	0	0
24	DF	(Greece)	Tsaousis	1	0	0	0	0	0	0	0	0	1	0	0
7	MF	(Morocco)	El Kaddouri	4	0	1	0	0	0	0	0	0	4	0	1
19	DF	(Greece)	Lyratzis	1	0	0	0	0	0	0	0	0	1	0	0
71	FW	(Spain)	Brandon	3	0	0	0	0	1	0	0	0	3	0	1
9	FW	(Portugal)	Oliveira	4	0	0	2	0	0	0	0	0	6	0	0
42	GK	(Croatia)	Kotarski	4	0	0	0	0	0	0	0	0	4	0	0
26	MF	(Portugal)	Dantas	3	0	0	0	0	0	0	0	0	3	0	0
22	MF	(Austria)	Schwab	6	0	0	2	0	0	0	0	0	8	0	0
59	DF	(Greece)	Koulierakis	4	0	0	1	0	0	0	0	0	5	0	0
21	MF	(Suriname)	Biseswar	1	0	0	0	0	0	0	0	0	1	0	0
55	DF	(Portugal)	R. Soares	3	0	0	1	0	0	0	0	0	4	0	0
65	MF	(Greece)	Konstantelias	3	0	0	1	0	0	0	0	0	4	0	0
77	FW	(Germany)	Narey	2	0	0	2	0	0	0	0	0	4	0	0
11	FW	(Brazil)	Taison	4	0	0	1	0	0	0	0	0	5	0	0
3	DF	(Norway)	Näsberg	1	0	0	0	0	0	0	0	0	1	0	0
18	GK	(Serbia)	Ž. Živković	1	0	0	0	0	0	0	0	0	1	0	0
