= Ivan Näsberg =

Norwegian footballer (born 1996)

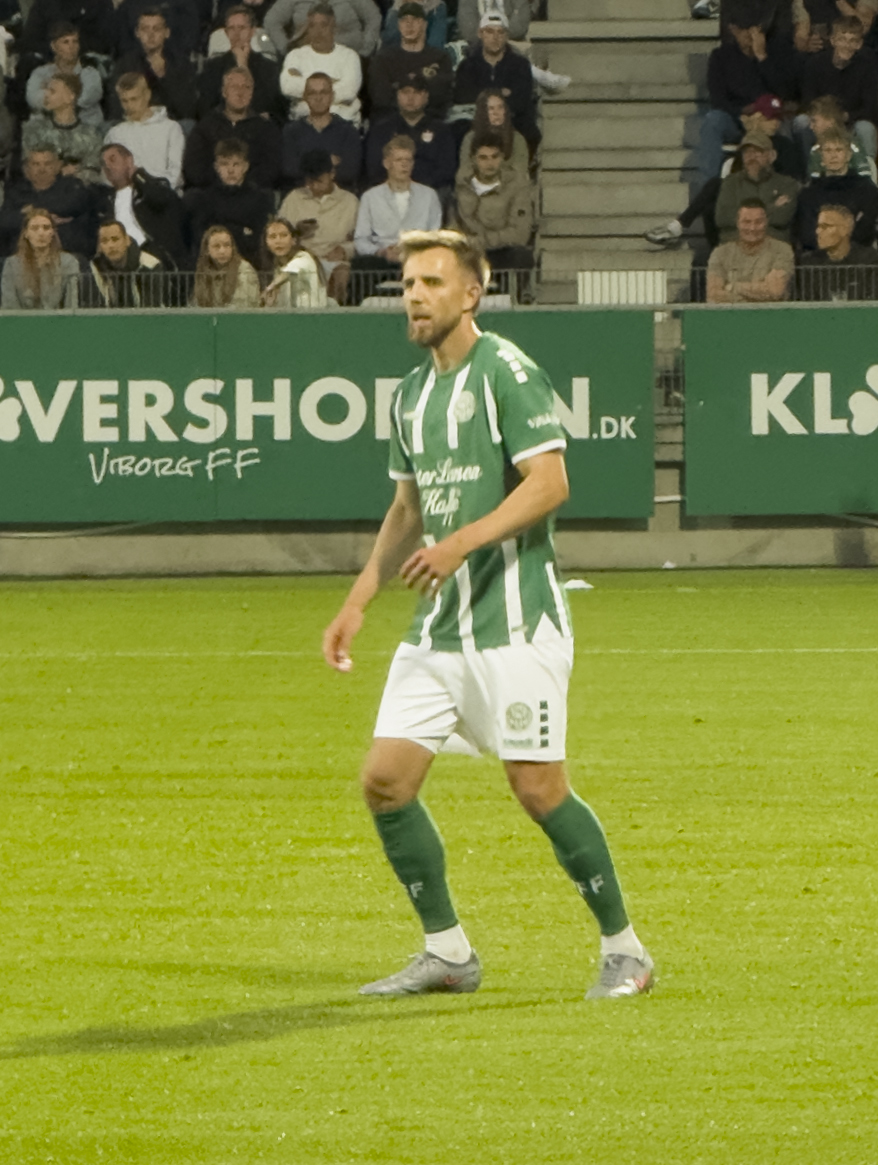
- Näsberg in 2025

Personal information
- Full name: Ivan Tarek Fjellstad Näsberg
- Date of birth: 22 April 1996 (age 30)
- Place of birth: Oslo, Norway
- Height: 1.87 m (6 ft 2 in)
- Position: Centre-back

Team information
- Current team: Vålerenga
- Number: 37

Youth career
- 2005–2014: Vålerenga

Senior career*
Years	Team	Apps	(Gls)
2013–2022	Vålerenga	132	(3)
2016	→ Varbergs BoIS (loan)	27	(1)
2022–2024	PAOK	22	(1)
2024–2025	Viborg	19	(3)
2025–	Vålerenga	22	(1)

International career^{‡}
2012	Norway U16	8	(0)
2013	Norway U17	9	(0)
2014	Norway U18	3	(0)
2014–2015	Norway U19	4	(0)
2014–2018	Norway U21	4	(0)
- * Club domestic league appearances and goals as of 23 July 2026 ‡ National team caps and goals as of 27 March 2018

Ivan Tarek Fjellstad Näsberg (born 22 April 1996) is a Norwegian professional footballer who plays as a centre-back for Eliteserien club Vålerenga.

== Career ==
=== Vålerenga ===
Ivan Näsberg was born in Vålerenga, grew up in Vålerenga, and apart from a year in Swedish Varbergs BoIS, he played his entire career in Vålerenga. In other words: He is a real Vålerenga boy. Ivan is a defensive player and is used both in center and as a left back. Näsberg made his league debut in July 2013 against Viking.

Born in Oslo on 22 April 1996, he started playing football in Valerenga at the age of 5, a lifetime, he is in the same team doing all the steps from the bottom up. Somehow he made his debut in the first division in 2013 at the age of just 17 years old. In his early seasons he did not play a significant role, but for the last four seasons he has established himself as a key player playing in 85 games out of a total of 141 appearances with the Oslo team jersey.With a height of 1.86m. Näsberg was on the transfer lists of Crystal Palace and Fulham, having stood out for his ability to "build" the game from the defense, with his appearances during that time not going unnoticed and the English press characterizing him "A very good solution at a low cost and with an eye on the future."

At that time the sale price was set at 1.2 million euros, around these numbers were traded by the people of Valerenga and Crystal Palace, however in the winter of 2021 the Londoners turned to other cases of defense and the issue of the Norwegian stopper remained aside.

=== PAOK ===
The Norwegian Ivan Näsberg comes with a free transfer, to sign for the Thessaloniki team of PAOK.

=== Viborg and return to Vålerenga ===
On 2 September 2024, Danish Superliga club Viborg confirmed that Näsberg joined the club on a deal until June 2027. He was sold exactly one year later, rejoining Vålerenga on 2 September 2025.

== Career statistics ==
As of match played 22 March 2026

Appearances and goals by club, season and competition
Club	Season	League			National cup		Europe		Total	
Club	Season	Division	Apps	Goals	Apps	Goals	Apps	Goals	Apps	Goals
Vålerenga	2013	Tippeligaen	5	0	—		—		5	0
Vålerenga	2014	Tippeligaen	4	0	1	0	—		5	0
Vålerenga	2015	Tippeligaen	9	0	1	0	—		10	0
Vålerenga	2017	Eliteserien	15	1	4	0	—		19	1
Vålerenga	2018	Eliteserien	14	0	3	0	—		17	0
Vålerenga	2019	Eliteserien	22	0	1	0	—		23	0
Vålerenga	2020	Eliteserien	29	2	—		—		29	2
Vålerenga	2021	Eliteserien	26	0	1	0	2	1	29	1
Vålerenga	2022	Eliteserien	8	0	—		—		8	0
Vålerenga	Total		132	3	11	0	2	1	145	5
Varbergs BoIS (loan)	2016	Superettan	27	1	4	0	—		31	1
PAOK	2022-23	Super League Greece	12	1	2	0	—		14	1
PAOK	2023-24	Super League Greece	8	0	3	1	—		11	1
PAOK	2024-25	Super League Greece	1	0	—		—		1	0
PAOK	Total		21	1	5	1	—		26	2
Viborg	2024-25	Danish Superliga	14	3	3	0	—		17	3
Viborg	2025–26	Danish Superliga	5	0	0	0	—		5	0
Viborg	Total		19	3	3	0	0	0	22	3
Vålerenga	2025	Eliteserien	10	0	—		—		10	0
Vålerenga	2026	Eliteserien	2	1	0	0	—		2	1
Vålerenga	Total		12	1	0	0	0	0	12	1
Career total			211	9	23	1	2	1	236	12

== Honours ==
PAOK

- Super League Greece: 2023–24
