= Rafa Soares =

Portuguese footballer (born 1995)

Personal information
- Full name: Luís Rafael Soares Alves
- Date of birth: 9 May 1995 (age 31)
- Place of birth: Marco de Canaveses, Portugal
- Height: 1.77 m (5 ft 9 1/2 in)
- Position: Left-back

Team information
- Current team: Estrela Amadora
- Number: 55

Youth career
- 2003–2005: Alpendorada
- 2005–2014: Porto

Senior career*
Years	Team	Apps	(Gls)
2013–2018	Porto B	61	(8)
2016	→ Académica (loan)	15	(1)
2016–2017	→ Rio Ave (loan)	32	(3)
2017–2018	→ Fulham (loan)	3	(0)
2018	Portimonense	11	(0)
2018–2022	Vitória Guimarães	67	(1)
2020–2021	→ Eibar (loan)	25	(0)
2022–2024	PAOK	40	(2)
2024–2026	Famalicão	50	(1)
2026–	Estrela Amadora	11	(0)

International career
2010–2011	Portugal U16	11	(0)
2011–2012	Portugal U17	12	(1)
2012	Portugal U18	3	(0)
2012–2014	Portugal U19	30	(2)
2014	Portugal U20	7	(0)
2014–2016	Portugal U21	9	(0)
Medal record
Men's football
Representing Portugal
UEFA European Under-19 Championship
Runner-up	2014 Hungary
- * Club domestic league appearances and goals as of 22:25, 8 November 2026 (UTC)

Luís Rafael "Rafa" Soares Alves (born 9 May 1995) is a Portuguese professional footballer who plays as a left-back for Primeira Liga club Estrela da Amadora.

== Club career ==
=== Porto ===
Born in Marco de Canaveses, Porto District, Soares joined FC Porto's youth system in 2005 from local F.C. Alpendorada. On 21 August 2013, while still a junior, he made his professional debut with the former's reserves, coming on as a 79th-minute substitute in a 1–0 away win against Portimonense S.C. in the Segunda Liga.

From January 2016 to June 2017, Soares was on loan to Académica de Coimbra and Rio Ave FC, with both clubs in the Primeira Liga. He played his first game in the competition on 22 January 2016 while at service of the former in a 2–1 away loss to Vitória de Setúbal, and scored his first goal the following matchday but in a 3–2 defeat at Sporting CP.

On 22 August 2017, deemed surplus to requirements by new Porto manager Sérgio Conceição, Soares was loaned to EFL Championship side Fulham in a season-long deal. He made his debut on 31 October, coming from the bench in a 0–2 home loss to Bristol City.

Soares' deal was mutually terminated by on 31 January 2018, after they had loaned Matt Targett earlier that month. The same day, he signed a permanent contract with Portimonense in his country's top flight.

=== Vitória Guimarães ===
On 6 July 2018, Soares agreed to a contract at Vitória de Guimarães. On 31 January 2020, he joined SD Eibar of Spain's La Liga on an 18-month loan with the option to buy.

After returning from the relegated Basque team, Soares scored his first Vitória goal on 21 November 2021, as a substitute in a 3–2 defeat at neighbours Moreirense F.C. in the fourth round of the Taça de Portugal.

=== PAOK ===
In June 2022, Soares signed a three-year deal with Super League Greece club PAOK FC. He totalled 33 games in his first season, finishing runner-up in the domestic cup.

Soares scored his first league goal on 25 November 2023, closing the 5–0 home win over Panserraikos FC. He added another in a 3–0 victory against PAS Lamia 1964, claiming the national championship alongside his compatriots André Ricardo and Vieirinha.

=== Later career ===
On 2 September 2024, Soares agreed to a two-year contract at F.C. Famalicão. He made 28 appearances in his debut campaign, but lost his place to Angolan international Pedro Bondo midway through 2025–26 only to regain it again.

Soares signed a two-year deal with fellow top-division side C.F. Estrela da Amadora on 22 July 2026.

== International career ==
Soares earned 72 caps for Portugal at youth level. He made his debut for the under-21 side on 13 November 2014, in a 3–1 friendly defeat against England.

== Career statistics ==
As of match played 24 April 2024

Appearances and goals by club, season and competition
Club	Season	League			National cup (Note: Includes Taça de Portugal, Copa del Rey, Greek Football Cup)		League cup (Note: Includes Taça da Liga)		Europe		Total	
Club	Season	Division	Apps	Goals	Apps	Goals	Apps	Goals	Apps	Goals	Apps	Goals
Porto B	2013–14	Segunda Liga	11	1	—		—		—		11	1
Porto B	2014–15	Segunda Liga	30	2	—		—		—		30	2
Porto B	2015–16	Segunda Liga	20	5	—		—		—		20	5
Porto B	Total		61	8	—		—		—		61	8
Académica (loan)	2015–16	Primeira Liga	15	1	—		—		—		15	1
Rio Ave (loan)	2016–17	Primeira Liga	32	3	—		3	0	2 (Note: Appearances in UEFA Europa League)	0	37	3
Fulham (loan)	2017–18	Championship	3	0	—		—		—		3	0
Portimonense	2017–18	Primeira Liga	11	0	—		—		—		11	0
Vitória Guimarães	2018–19	Primeira Liga	27	0	2	0	1	0	—		30	0
Vitória Guimarães	2019–20	Primeira Liga	10	0	1	0	1	0	5	0	17	0
Vitória Guimarães	2021–22	Primeira Liga	30	1	2	1	2	0	—		34	2
Vitória Guimarães	Total		67	1	5	1	4	0	5	0	81	2
Eibar (loan)	2019–20	La Liga	6	0	—		—		—		6	0
Eibar (loan)	2020–21	La Liga	19	0	3	0	—		—		22	0
Eibar (loan)	Total		25	0	3	0	—		—		28	0
PAOK	2022–23	Super League Greece	26	0	5	0	—		2 (Note: Appearances in UEFA Europa Conference League)	0	33	0
PAOK	2023–24	Super League Greece	12	2	4	0	—		5	0	21	2
PAOK	Total		38	2	9	0	—		7	0	54	2
Career Total			252	15	37	1	7	0	14	0	310	16

== Honours ==
Porto B

- LigaPro: 2015–16

PAOK

- Super League Greece: 2023–24
