= Nicolás Quagliata =

Uruguayan footballer (born 1999)

Personal information
- Full name: Nicolás Quagliata Platero
- Date of birth: 5 June 1999 (age 27)
- Place of birth: Montevideo, Uruguay
- Height: 1.72 m (5 ft 8 in)
- Positions: Left winger; attacking midfielder

Team information
- Current team: FBC Melgar
- Number: 10

Youth career
- 2002–2011: Ciclón del Cerrito
- 2011–2017: Defensor Sporting
- 2017–2019: Montevideo Wanderers

Senior career*
Years	Team	Apps	(Gls)
2019–2022	Montevideo Wanderers	68	(7)
2022–2023	PAOK	3	(0)
2023–2025	PAOK B	8	(1)
2023–2024	→ Cuiabá (loan)	9	(0)
2024–2025	→ Central Córdoba (loan)	8	(0)
2025–	FBC Melgar	16	(3)
- * Club domestic league appearances and goals as of 30 December 2025

Nicolás Quagliata Platero (born 5 June 1999) is a Uruguayan professional footballer who plays FBC Melgar. Mainly an attacking midfielder, he can also play as a left winger.

== Career ==
=== Early career ===
Quagliata was one of the youngest players at Defensor and between the ages of 12 and 13, following the prescription of an endocrinologist, he underwent growth hormone treatment, the same procedure as Lionel Messi had gone through when he was in training at Newell's Old Boys and one of the reasons why he emigrated to Barcelona.

=== Montevideo Wanderers ===
Quagliata graduated from Montevideo Wanderers B, and made his debut on 12 May 2019 in a match against C.A. Cerro, for the year's Primera División. In 2020, the bohemian DT became Mauricio Larriera who did not call him for the first three games of the Apertura after which the tournament was paralyzed for five months due to the coronavirus pandemic. In August, when football returned, he entered the team's rotation, although Larriera's cycle ended with the Apertura. Since Intermediate 2021, Wanderers is directed by Daniel Carreño. His name sounded like a possible reinforcement of Nacional, where his father is a technical assistant, and in Peñarol, where Larriera knows him first-hand.

Following the role of Carreño in leading the Wanderers, the team has been a finalist in Intermedio 2020 (lost on penalties in January 2021 against Nacional), was ninth in Clausura 2020, 11th in Apertura 2021 and third in Clausura 2021.

=== PAOK ===
Οn 3 June 2022, Quagliata signed a four-year contract with Greek club PAOK.

=== Cuiabá loan ===
Οn 10 March 2023, Quagliata completed the loan signing of Nicolás, until the winter of 2023 with Brazilian club Cuiabá.

=== Central Córdoba loan ===
On 24 July 2024, Quagliata joined Central Córdoba SdE on loan in the Argentine Primera División.

== Career statistics ==
As of 28 July 2022

Appearances and goals by club, season and competition
Club	Season	League			Cup		Continental		Other		Total	
Club	Season	Division	Apps	Goals	Apps	Goals	Apps	Goals	Apps	Goals	Apps	Goals
Montevideo Wanderers	2019	Uruguayan Primera División	1	0	—		0	0	—		1	0
Montevideo Wanderers	2020	Uruguayan Primera División	25	3	—		—		1 (Note: Appearance in Torneo Intermedio final.)	0	26	3
Montevideo Wanderers	2021	Uruguayan Primera División	28	4	—		1 (Note: Appearance in Copa Libertadores.)	0	1 (Note: Appearance in Supercopa Uruguaya.)	0	30	4
Montevideo Wanderers	2022	Uruguayan Primera División	14	0	0	0	7 (Note: Appearances in Copa Sudamericana.)	0	—		21	0
Montevideo Wanderers	Total		68	7	0	0	8	0	2	0	78	7
PAOK	2022–23	Greek Super League	3	0	0	0	2 (Note: Appearances in UEFA Europa Conference League.)	0	—		5	0
Career total			71	7	0	0	10	0	1	0	81	7

== Honours ==
Central Córdoba (SdE)

- Copa Argentina: 2024
