= Shola Shoretire =

English footballer

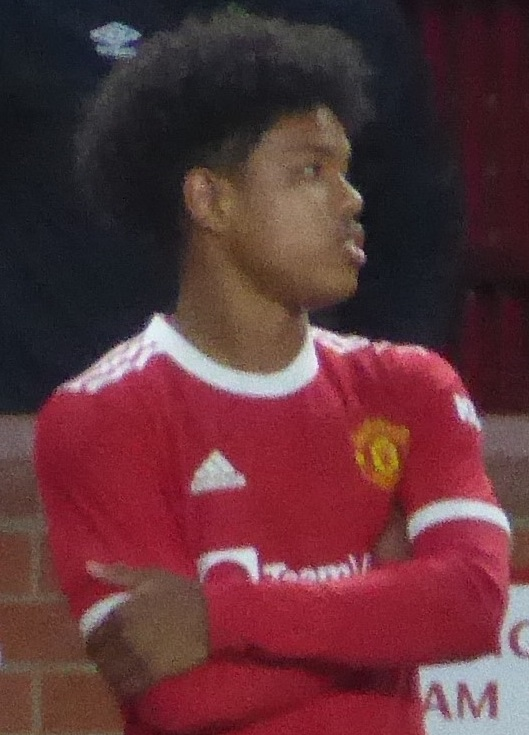
- Shoretire with Manchester United in 2021

Personal information
- Full name: Shola Maxwell Shoretire
- Date of birth: 2 February 2004 (age 22)
- Place of birth: Newcastle upon Tyne, England
- Height: 5 ft 7 in (1.70 m)
- Positions: Attacking midfielder; winger

Team information
- Current team: PAOK
- Number: 47

Youth career
- Wallsend Boys Club
- –2014: Newcastle United
- 2014: Manchester City
- 2014–2021: Manchester United

Senior career*
Years	Team	Apps	(Gls)
2021–2024	Manchester United	3	(0)
2023	→ Bolton Wanderers (loan)	16	(1)
2024–	PAOK	20	(4)
2025–2026	→ PEC Zwolle (loan)	24	(5)

International career
2019	England U15	1	(0)
2019	England U16	2	(0)
2021	England U18	1	(0)
2021	England U19	4	(0)
- * Club domestic league appearances and goals as of 20 September 2026

Shola Maxwell Shoretire (born 2 February 2004) is an English professional footballer who plays as an attacking midfielder or a winger for Super League Greece club PAOK.

Shoretire was a part of Manchester United's youth system from a young age and won the Jimmy Murphy Young Player of the Year award in the 2020–21 season. He signed his first professional contract in February 2021, at the age of 17, and made his first-team debut later that month in a Premier League game against Newcastle United. He holds the record as the youngest player to represent Manchester United in European competition.

Shoretire has played youth international football for England at under-15, under-16, under-18, and under-19 levels. He is also eligible to represent Nigeria at international level.

== Club career ==
=== Early career ===
As a child, Shoretire played with Whitley Bay Boys Club, Newcastle City Juniors, Wallsend Boys Club, Hebburn Town and Cramlington Juniors. He was also briefly part of Manchester City's youth setup, but left to join rivals Manchester United at the age of nine.

=== Manchester United ===
Shoretire quickly rose through the youth ranks of the Red Devils, frequently playing a year up his own age. In December 2018, he became the youngest ever player to appear in the UEFA Youth League at the age of 14 years and 314 days. In 2020, after impressing with the under-18s, Neil Wood, coach of the under-23s, handed him his under-23s debut when he was just 16. He scored a hat-trick in a 6–4 win for the under-23s against Blackburn Rovers in February 2021.

Shoretire signed his first professional contract with Manchester United on 8 February 2021, a week after turning 17. On 21 February 2021, he made his first-team debut for United as an 88th-minute substitute for Marcus Rashford in a 3–1 home league win over Newcastle United. Four days later, he became United's youngest player to make an appearance in a European competition, coming on as a substitute for Mason Greenwood in a 0–0 home draw against Real Sociedad in the UEFA Europa League at the age of 17 years and 23 days, beating the record set by Norman Whiteside 38 years earlier by 108 days. For his performances with the youth teams, Shoretire was named the Jimmy Murphy Young Player of the Year for 2020–21.

==== Loan to Bolton ====
On 19 January 2023, Shoretire officially joined EFL League One club Bolton Wanderers on loan until the end of the season. He was cup-tied as Bolton went on to win the 2022–23 EFL Trophy (having played against Bolton for Man United U21 earlier in the season). On 8 May 2023, he scored his first league goal in senior football, scoring the first goal in a 3-2 win over Bristol Rovers.

On 5 June 2024, United confirmed they were in talks with Shoretire about a new contract.

=== PAOK ===
On 30 July 2024, Shoretire signed with the Super League Greece club PAOK on a free transfer following the expiration of his contract at Manchester United.

On 2 September 2025, Shoretire joined Eredivisie side PEC Zwolle on loan.

== International career ==
As Shoretire was born in England to a Nigerian father and English mother, he is eligible to represent both nations at international level.

He made one appearance for the England under-15 team, in a friendly against Belgium in February 2019. He made two appearances for the England under-16 team in August 2019, against Denmark and the Republic of Ireland. On 29 March 2021, Shoretire made his debut and only appearance for the England under-18 team during a 2–0 away victory over Wales at the Leckwith Stadium in Cardiff.

On 2 September 2021, Shoretire made his debut for England at under-19 level during a 2–0 victory over Italy at St. George's Park. He made four appearances for the under-19 team.

== Career statistics ==
As of match played 7 February 2026

Appearances and goals by club, season and competition
Club	Season	League			National cup (Note: Includes Greek Cup, KNVB Cup)		League cup		Europe		Other		Total	
Club	Season	Division	Apps	Goals	Apps	Goals	Apps	Goals	Apps	Goals	Apps	Goals	Apps	Goals
Manchester United U21	2020–21	—			—		—		—		2 (Note: Appearances in EFL Trophy)	0	2	0
Manchester United U21	2021–22	—			—		—		—		2	0	2	0
Manchester United U21	2022–23	—			—		—		—		3	1	3	1
Manchester United U21	2023–24	—			—		—		—		3	2	3	2
Manchester United U21	Total		—		—		—		—		10	3	10	3
Manchester United	2020–21	Premier League	2	0	0	0	0	0	1 (Note: Appearance(s) in UEFA Europa League)	0	—		3	0
Manchester United	2021–22	Premier League	1	0	0	0	0	0	1 (Note: Appearance in UEFA Champions League)	0	—		2	0
Manchester United	2022–23	Premier League	0	0	0	0	0	0	0	0	—		0	0
Manchester United	Total		3	0	0	0	0	0	2	0	—		5	0
Bolton Wanderers (loan)	2022–23	League One	16	1	—		—		—		0	0	16	1
PAOK	2024–25	Super League Greece	18	2	3	2	—		6	0	—		27	4
PAOK	2025–26	Super League Greece	0	0	0	0	—		1	0	—		1	0
PAOK	Total		18	2	3	2	0	0	7	0	—		28	4
PEC Zwolle (loan)	2025–26	Eredivisie	19	5	2	1	—		—		—		21	6
Career total			56	8	5	3	0	0	9	0	10	3	80	14

== Honours ==
Manchester United

- UEFA Europa League runner-up: 2020–21

Individual

- Jimmy Murphy Young Player of the Year: 2020–21
- Eredivisie Talent of the Month: January 2026
