= Mady Camara =

Guinean footballer (born 1997)

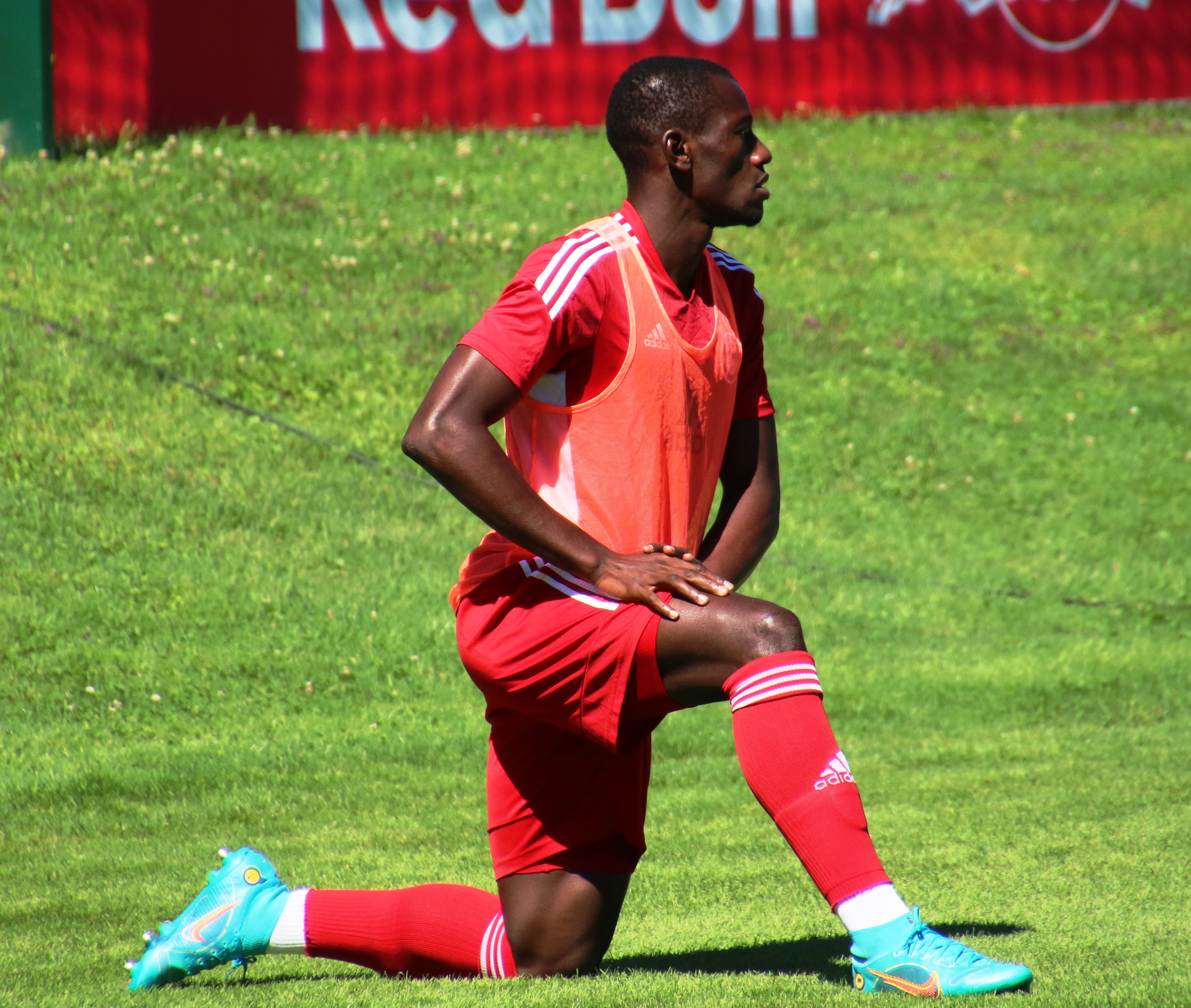
- Camara training with Olympiacos in 2022

Personal information
- Full name: Mohamed Mady Camara
- Date of birth: 28 February 1997 (age 29)
- Place of birth: Matam, Guinea
- Height: 1.82 m (6 ft 0 in)
- Position: Central midfielder

Team information
- Current team: PAOK
- Number: 2

Youth career
- 2013–2015: AS Kaloum
- 2015–2016: Santoba FC

Senior career*
Years	Team	Apps	(Gls)
2016–2018	Ajaccio	45	(2)
2018–2024	Olympiacos	131	(16)
2022–2023	→ Roma (loan)	15	(0)
2024–	PAOK	54	(9)

International career^{‡}
2018–	Guinea	29	(1)
- * Club domestic league appearances and goals as of 13 September 2026 ‡ National team caps and goals as of 12 September 2026

Mohamed Mady Camara (born 28 February 1997) is a Guinean professional footballer who plays as a central midfielder for Super League Greece club PAOK and the Guinea national team.

== Club career ==
=== Ajaccio ===
Camara began his career with Guinean sides AS Kaloum and Santoba FC, before training with French Ligue 2 side AC Ajaccio in May 2015. He impressed during his time on trial and signed a professional contract with the club in 2016.

On 20 May 2018, Camara scored a goal in the dying seconds of extra time to tie the game at 2–2 against Havre in the promotion playoffs semifinal. Ajaccio won in penalties 5–3, after Ghislain Gimbert scored the decisive penalty.

=== Olympiacos ===
On 6 March 2018, he signed a five-year contract with Super League giants Olympiacos ahead of the 2018–19 season for an undisclosed fee. The cost of the transfer was estimated to €2.5 million. On 16 September 2018, he scored in a 2–1 home win game against Asteras Tripolis.

On 17 February 2019, he scored in a 4–1 home win against champions AEK Athens. On 7 April 2019, he again scored in a 5–0 away win against Panetolikos. On 21 April 2019, Camara opened the scoring for Olympiacos in a 3–1 away win against Lamia, but PAOK's win the same day confirmed that Olympiacos would finish as runners-up behind PAOK.

On 27 October 2019, the 22-year-old Guinean hit the jackpot third time lucky with a powerful shot from the edge of the penalty area which nestled in the top right corner of Panagiotis Tsintotas’ goal in a 2–0 home derby win game against rivals AEK Athens. On 22 January 2020, he scored his only goal in a 1–0 away win against OFI. On 15 June 2020, he scored a brace within two minutes and assisted a goal for Georgios Masouras, in a 3–1 home victory over Aris for the Super League championship play-offs.

On 21 July 2021 Camara scored the only goal against Neftçi Baku in a 1–0 home win but was later sent off after a hard foul. On 19 August 2021, he scored giving the lead in a 3–0 home win 2021–22 UEFA Europa League playoffs 1st round game against Slovan Bratislava.

=== Roma ===
On 31 August 2022, Camara joined AS Roma on a season-long loan, with an option to buy.

=== PAOK ===
On 20 June 2024, PAOK announced the signing of Camara on a three-year contract.

== International career ==
Camara made his senior debut for Guinea in a 1–0 2019 Africa Cup of Nations qualification win over Central African Republic on 9 September 2018.

== Career statistics ==
=== Club ===
As of match played 10 April 2025

Appearances and goals by club, season and competition
Club	Season	League			National cup (Note: Includes Coupe de France, Greek Cup)		League cup (Note: Includes Coupe de la Ligue)		Continental		Other		Total	
Club	Season	Division	Apps	Goals	Apps	Goals	Apps	Goals	Apps	Goals	Apps	Goals	Apps	Goals
Ajaccio	2016–17	Ligue 2	18	2	1	0	0	0	—		—		19	2
Ajaccio	2017–18	Ligue 2	27	0	2	0	1	0	—		2 (Note: Appearances in Ligue 2 promotion play-offs)	1	32	1
Ajaccio	Total		45	2	3	0	1	0	—		2	1	51	3
Olympiacos	2018–19	Super League Greece	24	6	2	0	—		10	0	—		36	6
Olympiacos	2019–20	Super League Greece	31	6	5	1	—		15	0	—		51	7
Olympiacos	2020–21	Super League Greece	31	3	5	0	—		10	1	—		46	4
Olympiacos	2021–22	Super League Greece	28	0	4	0	—		13	2	—		45	2
Olympiacos	2022–23	Super League Greece	0	0	0	0	—		3	0	—		3	0
Olympiacos	2023–24	Super League Greece	17	1	2	0	—		10	0	—		29	1
Olympiacos	Total		131	16	18	1	—		61	3	—		210	20
Roma (Ioan)	2022–23	Serie A	15	0	0	0	—		6	0	—		21	0
PAOK	2024–25	Super League Greece	27	9	4	1	—		15	0	—		46	10
Career total			218	27	25	2	1	0	82	3	2	1	328	33

=== International ===
As of match played 12 October 2021

Appearances and goals by national team and year
National team	Year	Apps	Goals
Guinea	2018	4	0
Guinea	2019	9	0
Guinea	2020	2	1
Guinea	2021	6	0
Total		21	1

Scores and results list Guinea's goal tally first, score column indicates score after each Camara goal.

List of international goals scored by Mady Camara
No.	Date	Venue	Opponent	Score	Result	Competition
1	11 November 2020	Stade du 28 Septembre, Conakry, Guinea	Chad	1–0	1–0	2021 Africa Cup of Nations qualification

== Honours ==
Olympiacos

- Super League Greece: 2019–20, 2020–21, 2021–22
- Greek Football Cup: 2019–20; runner-up: 2020–21

Roma

- UEFA Europa League runner-up: 2022–23

Individual

- Guinean Footballer of the Year: 2019–20
- PAOK Player of the Season: 2024–25
