= Olympiada, Kozani =

Olympiada Ολυμπιάδα
- Community
- Location within Greece
- Coordinates: 40°34.2′N 21°36′E
- Country: Greece
- Administrative region: West Macedonia
- Regional unit: Kozani
- Municipality: Eordaia
- Municipal unit: Ptolemaida
- Elevation: 670 m (2,200 ft)

Population (2021)
  - Community: 537
- Time zone: UTC+2 (EET)
  - Summer (DST): UTC+3 (EEST)
- Postal code: 502 00
- Area code: +30-2463
- Vehicle registration: ΚΖ

Olympiada (Greek: Ολυμπιάδα), known before 1927 as Rakita (Greek: Ρακίτα), is a village and a community of the Eordaia municipality. Before the 2011 local government reform it was part of the municipality of Ptolemaida, of which it was a municipal district. The 2021 census recorded 537 inhabitants in the village.

== History ==
Olympiada was first mentioned in an Ottoman defter of 1481, the village, then known as Rakita, had forty-five households and produced vines, honey, and swine.
