= André Ricardo =

Portuguese footballer

Personal information
- Full name: André Miguel Lapa Ricardo
- Date of birth: 23 August 2000 (age 26)
- Place of birth: Lisbon, Portugal
- Height: 1.78 m (5 ft 10 in)
- Positions: Attacking midfielder; winger

Team information
- Current team: Lusitânia Lourosa
- Number: 10

Youth career
- 2009–2017: Benfica
- 2017–2018: Braga
- 2019–2021: Famalicão

Senior career*
Years	Team	Apps	(Gls)
2020–2022	Famalicão	4	(0)
2022–2025	PAOK	3	(0)
2022–2026	PAOK B	14	(0)
2024–2025	→ Chaves (loan)	26	(3)
2026–	Lusitânia Lourosa	3	(1)
- * Club domestic league appearances and goals as of 14 September 2026

André Miguel Lapa Ricardo (born 23 August 2000), known as André Ricardo, is a Portuguese professional footballer who plays as a winger for Liga Portugal 2 club Lusitânia Lourosa.

== Career ==
=== Famalicão ===
Andre Ricardo was born in August 2000 in Lisbon and from 2007 to 2017 he was in the infrastructure departments of Benfica, from there he transferred to U19 Braga and then transferred to U23 of Famalicão. He was the main figure of the latest edition of the Revelation League. In a training course that started at Benfica and ended at FC Famalicão, with a spell at Braga, André Ricardo celebrated the rise of the under-19 team of the Famalicenses to the I National Division. He made his Primeira Liga debut for Famalicão on 8 August 2021 in a game against Paços de Ferreira.

=== PAOK ===
Ricardo signed for PAOK FC as a free agent. On 31 January he scored his first goal with PAOK in a 5–0 victory against Panserraikos for the quarter finals of the Greek Cup.

== Career statistics ==
=== Club ===
As of 8 July 2022

Club	Season	League			National Cup		League Cup		Continental		Other		Total	
Club	Season	Division	Apps	Goals	Apps	Goals	Apps	Goals	Apps	Goals	Apps	Goals	Apps	Goals
Famalicão	2019–20	Primeira Liga	—		—		—		—		12 (Note: Appearances in Liga Portugal 2.)	1	12	1
Famalicão	2020–21	Primeira Liga	—		—		—		—		20	11	20	11
Famalicão	2021–22	Primeira Liga	4	0	—		—		—		2	1	6	1
Famalicão	Total		4	0	—		—		—		34	13	38	13
PAOK	2022–23	Super League	3	0	0	0	—		0	0	—		0	0
Career total			4	0	0	0	—		0	0	34	13	38	13
