= Živko Živković =

Serbian footballer (born 1989)

Personal information
- Date of birth: 14 April 1989 (age 37)
- Place of birth: Titovo Užice, SR Serbia, Yugoslavia
- Height: 1.94 m (6 ft 4 1/2 in)
- Position: Goalkeeper

Team information
- Current team: Panetolikos
- Number: 12

Youth career
- Sloboda Užice
- 2005–2007: Partizan

Senior career*
Years	Team	Apps	(Gls)
2007–2016	Partizan	36	(0)
2007	→ Teleoptik (loan)	4	(0)
2008–2010	→ Metalac (loan)	61	(0)
2011–2012	→ Metalac (loan)	13	(0)
2012	→ Teleoptik (loan)	10	(0)
2016–2019	Xanthi	90	(0)
2019–2024	PAOK	44	(0)
2023	PAOK B	1	(0)
2024–2025	Anorthosis	29	(0)
2025–	Panetolikos	0	(0)

International career
2005	Serbia and Montenegro U17 (Note: Only official UEFA matches included)	1	(0)
2007–2008	Serbia U19	7	(0)
2009	Serbia U20	2	(0)
2007–2010	Serbia U21	6	(0)
- * Club domestic league appearances and goals as of 24 April 2025

Živko Živković (Serbian Cyrillic: Живко Живковић; born 14 April 1989) is a Serbian professional footballer who plays as a goalkeeper for Greek Super League club Panetolikos.

Internationally, Živković represented his country at every level from under-17 to under-21.

== Club career ==
=== Partizan ===
After starting out with his hometown club Sloboda Užice, Živković joined the youth system of Partizan in 2005. He was subsequently promoted to their first team in the spring of 2007, before signing his first professional contract with the club on 1 June 2007, on a five-year deal. Živković initially played for Teleoptik, before returning to Partizan. He made his competitive debut for the club in a 5–1 home league win over OFK Beograd, on 8 December 2007, coming on as a substitute for the injured Darko Božović.

In the summer of 2008, in order to gain more playing time and experience, Živković was sent on loan to Metalac Gornji Milanovac. He immediately became the first-choice goalkeeper in his first season at the club, as they got promoted to the Serbian SuperLiga. In the following season, the club's first in the top flight, Živković missed only one out of 30 games, helping his team avoid relegation.

In the summer of 2010, Živković returned to Partizan, being projected as a backup goalkeeper to Radiša Ilić. He dropped out of the 18-man squad after Vladimir Stojković joined the club in late August 2010. Eventually, Živković made one league and one cup appearance in the 2010–11 season. He was again loaned to Metalac Gornji Milanovac in the summer of 2011, making 13 league appearances in the 2011–12 season.

After leaving Gornji Milanovac for the second time, Živković started the 2012–13 campaign at Teleoptik, before being promoted back to Partizan in October 2012, as a replacement for the injured Vladimir Stojković. He recorded one league appearance until the end of the season, as the club won its sixth consecutive championship title. In the following season, Živković made his debut in UEFA competitions, coming on as a substitute for the injured Milan Lukač in the second leg of the Champions League third qualifying round versus Ludogorets Razgrad on 6 August 2013. He managed to make four league appearances in the 2013–14 season.

In the fall of 2014, Živković was still the second-choice goalkeeper to Milan Lukač. He only appeared in the Serbian Cup first round, keeping a clean sheet in a 1–0 away win over Bežanija on 24 September 2014. However, Živković earned himself a place in the first eleven at the start of the spring season, quickly becoming an irreplaceable member of the team. He continued to play regularly in the fall of 2015, but was removed from the squad after the arrival of new manager Ivan Tomić.

=== Xanthi ===
On 10 June 2016, it was announced that Živković officially signed with Greek club Xanthi. He played the full 90 minutes in all of his team's 30 appearances in the 2016–17 Super League Greece, conceding only 25 goals in the process. In the following 2017–18 campaign, Živković remained Xanthi's first-choice goalkeeper, conceding 29 goals in 29 games.

On 21 April 2019, the Serbian goalkeeper announced via his facebook account his decision to leave the club, upon the expiration of his contract.

=== PAOK ===
On 26 June 2019, Zivkovic’s contract with Xanthi is expiring, and PAOK pounced to sign him as a free agent. The reliable 30-year-old will form the back-up for Alexandros Paschalakis after Rodrigo Rey was shifted out on loan to Pachuca. He signed a three years' contract for an €300,000 annual fee. The Serb played in 52 matches, keeping 21 clean sheets, while also winning the Greek Cup of the 2020-21 season. Zivkovic has been with the club for three years, which will become five years under the new contract signed by the Serbian goalkeeper. After the departure of Paschalakis, PAOK decided to keep Zivkovic for the position of substitute goalkeeper. On 7 June 2024, it was decided by the manager team of PAOK that Zivko Zivkovic's contract would not be renewed and he would depart from the club upon the expiry of his contract.

== International career ==
Živković represented Serbia and Montenegro at the 2006 UEFA Under-17 Championship, together with his club teammates Stevan Jovetić and Nikola Gulan, among others. He then represented Serbia at the 2007 UEFA Under-19 Championship. In the meantime, Živković made his debut for the Serbia national under-21 team in a 6–2 home friendly victory over Cyprus U21 on 15 May 2007. He was also a member of the team that took part at the 2009 UEFA Under-21 Championship. Previously, Živković represented the under-20 team at an international friendly tournament in Qatar.

On 30 May 2015, following his consistent performances at club level, Živković received his first call-up for the Serbia national team. He was an unused substitute in a friendly against Azerbaijan on 7 June, as well as in a UEFA Euro 2016 qualifier against Denmark on 13 June.

== Career statistics ==
As of 25 February 2024

Appearances and goals by club, season and competition
Club	Season	League			National cup		Continental		Total	
Club	Season	Division	Apps	Goals	Apps	Goals	Apps	Goals	Apps	Goals
Partizan	2007–08	Serbian SuperLiga	1	0	—		—		1	0
Partizan	2010–11	Serbian SuperLiga	1	0	1	0	—		2	0
Partizan	2012–13	Serbian SuperLiga	1	0	—		—		1	0
Partizan	2013–14	Serbian SuperLiga	4	0	—		1	0	5	0
Partizan	2014–15	Serbian SuperLiga	14	0	4	0	—		18	0
Partizan	2015–16	Serbian SuperLiga	15	0	1	0	10	0	26	0
Partizan	Total		36	0	6	0	11	0	53	0
Teleoptik (loan)	2007–08	Serbian SuperLiga	4	0	1	0	—		5	0
Teleoptik (loan)	2012–13	Serbian SuperLiga	10	0	1	0	—		11	0
Teleoptik (loan)	Total		14	0	2	0	—		16	0
Metalac (loan)	2008–09	Serbian SuperLiga	32	0	1	0	—		33	0
Metalac (loan)	2009–10	Serbian SuperLiga	29	0	2	0	—		31	0
Metalac (loan)	2011–12	Serbian SuperLiga	13	0	1	0	—		14	0
Metalac (loan)	Total		74	0	4	0	—		78	0
Xanthi	2016–17	Super League Greece	30	0	6	0	—		36	0
Xanthi	2017–18	Super League Greece	29	0	3	0	—		32	0
Xanthi	2018–19	Super League Greece	30	0	5	0	—		35	0
Xanthi	Total		89	0	14	0	—		103	0
PAOK	2019–20	Super League Greece	20	0	—		—		20	0
PAOK	2020–21	Super League Greece	18	0	1	0	9	0	28	0
PAOK	2021–22	Super League Greece	2	0	2	0	—		4	0
PAOK	2022–23	Super League Greece	2	0	2	0	—		4	0
PAOK	2023–24	Super League Greece	2	0	4	0	—		6	0
PAOK	Total		44	0	9	0	9	0	62	0
Career total			258	0	35	0	20	0	313	0

== Honours ==
Partizan

- Serbian SuperLiga: 2007–08, 2010–11, 2012–13, 2014–15
- Serbian Cup: 2007–08, 2010–11

PAOK

- Super League Greece: 2023–24
- Greek Cup: 2020–21
