= 2021–22 PAOK FC season =

PAOK
2021–22 season
- President: Ivan Savvidis
- Manager: Răzvan Lucescu
- Stadium: Toumba Stadium
- Super League 1: 2nd
- Greek Cup: Runners-up
- UEFA Europa Conference League: Quarter-finals
- Top goalscorer: League: Jasmin Kurtić (15 goals); All: Jasmin Kurtić (18 goals)
Home colours	Away colours	Third colours

The 2021–22 PAOK FC season is the club's 96th season in existence and the club's 63rd consecutive season in the top flight of Greek football. In addition to the domestic league, PAOK are participating in this season's editions of the Greek Cup and in the inaugural Europa Conference League. The season covers the period from 22 July 2021 to 30 June 2022.

== Season Overview ==
Restricted attendance and games behind closed doors were common in this season due to the COVID-19 pandemic in Thessaloniki, however the team recorded its best run at a UEFA competition since 1974 by reaching the last 8 of the newly created UEFA Europa Conference League in its inaugural season.

Starting in the 3rd qualifying round, the team had a sluggish start in the qualifying rounds, barely scraping by against Irish side Bohemians after a shock 2–1 defeat against them at the Aviva Stadium, by narrowly winning the return leg 2–0 at Toumba Stadium. Răzvan Lucescu, the much revered PAOK manager who led the team to the Double in 2018–19 and had major success with Al–Hilal, along with his assistant Cristiano Bacci, returned to the club in the pre–season, but the struggle against Bohemians was met with intense criticism and backlash. A last minute own–goal by Niko Galešić gave PAOK a 1–1 draw at home against Croatian club Rijeka, which was met with more criticism, with many fearing that the team was not capable of advancing to the group stage of the new competition. Contrary to the first match at home, PAOK won 0–2 at Stadion Rujevica and managed to advance to the group stage.

Coincing with the team's initial boost and then slump in form in the league, PAOK had an unspectacular group stage phase but had a bright spot in the 1–2 away win over eventual group toppers Copenhagen. In spite of the team not performing too well in the group stage, the 11 points accumulated were enough to hoist the team above Slovan Bratislava (who deprived PAOK of a Europa League group stage spot two years earlier) and advance the team to the Knockout round play–offs as the second placed team in the group. After the group stage ended, PAOK managed to undo the November slump in the league and would go on an unbeaten streak that would stretch until the end of the league's regular season, earning plaudits for Lucescu and Bacci.

The team easily disarmed AEL in the Greek Football Cup in December before memorably knocking out rivals AEK Athens in the quarter–finals, courtesy of two late goals from club top scorer Jasmin Kurtić and Alexandru Mitriță after PAOK were 1–0 down on aggregate at the Olympic Stadium.

== Coaching staff ==
Position	Staff
Head coach	(Romania) Răzvan Lucescu
Assistant Coach	(Italy) Cristiano Bacci
Goalkeeping Coach	(Portugal) Jose Moreira
Head Fitness Coach	(Italy) Matteo Spatafora
Fitness coach	(Italy) Paolo Castorina
Rehabilitation Coach	(Greece) Georgios Tsonakas

Last updated: 26 May 2021

== Players ==
=== Squad ===
As of 15 February 2022

Note: Flags indicate national team as defined under FIFA eligibility rules; some limited exceptions apply. Players may hold more than one non-FIFA nationality.

No.	Pos.	Nation	Player
31	GK	GRE	Alexandros Paschalakis
88	GK	SRB	Živko Živković
64	GK	GRE	Christos Talichmanidis
4	DF	ISL	Sverrir Ingi Ingason
49	DF	GRE	Giannis Michailidis
5	DF	CPV	Fernando Varela (vice-captain)
6	DF	ALB	Enea Mihaj
15	DF	ESP	José Ángel Crespo (vice-captain)
16	DF	BRA	Sidcley (on loan from Dynamo Kyiv)
20	MF	POR	Vieirinha (captain)
13	DF	BRA	Lucas Taylor
19	DF	GRE	Lefteris Lyratzis
8	MF	BRA	Douglas Augusto
23	DF	ESP	Joan Sastre

No.	Pos.	Nation	Player
22	MF	AUT	Stefan Schwab
50	MF	POR	Filipe Soares
27	MF	SLO	Jasmin Kurtić (on loan from Parma)
51	MF	GRE	Theocharis Tsingaras
7	MF	MAR	Omar El Kaddouri
21	FW	SUR	Diego Biseswar
65	MF	GRE	Giannis Konstantelias
28	FW	ROU	Alexandru Mitriță
14	FW	SRB	Andrija Živković
10	MF	AUT	Thomas Murg
11	FW	BRA	Léo Jabá
29	FW	CRO	Antonio Čolak
47	FW	ENG	Chuba Akpom
18	FW	POR	Nélson Oliveira
70	FW	GRE	Georgios Koutsias

== Transfers ==
=== In ===
No.	Pos	Player	Transferred from	Fee	Date	Source	
–	FW	(Suriname) Diego Biseswar	(Cyprus) Apollon Limassol	Loan return			
13	DF	(Brazil) Lucas Taylor	(Ukraine) Dnipro-1	Free transfer	29 June 2021		
–	GK	(Greece) Nikos Bourganis	(Greece) Karaiskakis	Loan return			
–	DF	(Greece) Marios Tsaousis	(Slovakia) Spartak Trnava	Loan return			
–	DF	(Greece) Stathis Tachatos	(Greece) Trikala	Loan return			
–	DF	(Greece) Petros Kaloutsikidis	(Greece) Niki Volos	Loan return			
–	MF	(Nigeria) Anderson Esiti	(Turkey) Göztepe	Loan return			
–	MF	(Greece) Zisis Chatzistravos	(Greece) Lamia	Loan return			
–	MF	(Greece) Anastasios Meletidis	(Cyprus) Onisilos Sotira	Loan return			
–	MF	(Greece) Konstantinos Korelas	(Greece) Karaiskakis	Loan return			
–	FW	(Greece) Vasilios Fasidis	(Greece) Trikala	Loan return			
–	FW	(Greece) Antonis Gaitanidis	(Greece) Levadiakos	Loan return			
–	FW	(Greece) Dimitrios Panidis	(Greece) Trikala	Loan return			
–	FW	(Portugal) Nélson Oliveira	(Greece) AEK Athens	Free Transfer			
–	FW	(Greece) Panagiotis Tzimas	(Greece) Asteras Tripolis	350,000			
27	MF	(Slovenia) Jasmin Kurtić	(Italy) Parma	Loan	18 July 2021		
47	FW	(England) Chuba Akpom	(England) Middlesbrough	Loan	25 August 2021		
16	DF	(Brazil) Sidcley	(Ukraine) Dynamo Kyiv	Loan	27 August 2021		
28	MF	(Romania) Alexandru Mitriță	(United States) New York City	Loan	31 August 2021		
32	MF	(Georgia (country)) Nika Ninua	(Cyprus) Anorthosis	Loan Return	3 January 2022		
11	FW	(Brazil) Léo Jabá	(Brazil) Vasco da Gama	Loan Return			
29	FW	(Croatia) Antonio Čolak	(Sweden) Malmö FF	Loan Return			
23	DF	(Spain) Joan Sastre	(Spain) Mallorca	Loan	14 January 2022		
50	MF	(Portugal) Filipe Soares	(Portugal) Moreirense	3.0 M	27 January 2022		
Total							€3.350,000

=== Out ===
No.	Pos	Player	Transferred to	Fee	Date	Source	
–	DF	(Greece) Dimitrios Giannoulis	(England) Norwich City	7,500,000	1 July 2021		
27	FW	(Czech Republic) Michael Krmenčík	(Belgium) Club Brugge	End of loan	30 June 2021		
21	DF	(Ghana) Baba Rahman	(England) Chelsea	End of loan	30 June 2021		
11	FW	(Greece) Christos Tzolis	(England) Norwich City	13,000,000	12 August 2021		
29	FW	(Greece) Georgios Vrakas	(Greece) Levadiakos	Loan	21 August 2021		
16	DF	(Norway) Adrian Pereira	(Norway) Rosenborg	500,000	24 August 2021		
	DF	(Greece) Pavlos Logaras	(Greece) Volos		24 August 2021		
8	MF	(Egypt) Amr Warda	(Cyprus) Anorthosis	Free transfer (but with a 50% resale-clause)	29 August 2021		
32	MF	(Georgia (country)) Nika Ninua	(Cyprus) Anorthosis	Loan	30 August 2021		
97	FW	(Greece) Lazaros Lamprou	(Greece) OFI	Loan	31 August 2021		
23	MF	(Japan) Shinji Kagawa	(Belgium) Sint-Truiden	Free transfer	18 December 2021		
2	DF	(Brazil) Rodrigo Soares	(Brazil) Juventude	Free transfer	14 January 2022		
9	FW	(Poland) Karol Świderski	(United States) Charlotte FC	5.5 M	26 January 2022		
32	MF	(Georgia (country)) Nika Ninua	(Greece) Lamia	Loan	28 January 2022		
65	MF	(Greece) Giannis Konstantelias	(Belgium) Eupen	Loan	18 January 2022		
44	MF	(Nigeria) Anderson Esiti	(Hungary) Ferencváros	Free Transfer	15 February 2022		
Total							€26,500,000

== Pre-season and other friendlies ==
Win Draw Loss

Friday, 9 July 2021 Friendly	PAOK	3–1	Volos	Thessaloniki
19:00 EET, UTC+02:00	Gordeziani 44'; Esiti 47'; Michailidis 86'		39' van Weert	Stadium: Toumba Stadium; Attendance: C. doors due to COVID-19; Referee: Aggelos Aggelakis

Wednesday, 14 July 2021 Friendly	PSV	1–0	PAOK	Eindhoven
21:00 EET, UTC+02:00	Madueke 25'		(yellow card) 42' A. Živković; (yellow card) 84' Schwab; (yellow card) 87' Lyratzis	Stadium: Philips Stadion; Attendance: 20,000; Referee: Dennis Higler

Saturday, 17 July 2021 Friendly	Charleroi	0–2	PAOK	Sportpark Wiesel, Wenum-Wiesel
14:00 EET, UTC+02:00			47' Oliveira; 89' Murg	Attendance: behind closed doors

Wednesday, 21 July 2021 Friendly	Heracles Almelo	1–2	PAOK	Sportpark Wiesel, Wenum-Wiesel
15:00 EET, UTC+02:00	Rai Vloet 17'		14', 33' Oliveira	Attendance: behind closed doors

Sunday, 25 July 2021 Friendly	Feyenoord	1–2	PAOK	Rotterdam
15:30 EET, UTC+02:00	Burger 2'		14' (pen.) Tzolis; 52' Koutsias	Stadium: De Kuip; Attendance: 15,000; Referee: Jochem Kamphuis

Saturday, 4 September 2021 Friendly	Veria	0–1	PAOK	Veria
18:00 EET, UTC+02:00			69' (pen.) Kagawa	Stadium: Veria Stadium; Attendance: N/A; Referee: Dimitris Maloutas (Imathia)

== Competitions ==
=== Overview ===
Competition	First match	Last match	Starting round	Record							
Competition	First match	Last match	Starting round	Pld	W	D	L	GF	GA	GD	Win %
Super League Greece	12 September 2021	17 May 2022	Matchday 1	36	19	7	10	58	33	+25	52.78
Greek Football Cup	1 December 2021	21 May 2022	Round of 16	7	2	4	1	7	5	+2	28.57
UEFA Europa Conference League	3 August 2021	14 April 2022	Third qualifying round	16	8	3	5	20	13	+7	50.00
Total				59	29	14	16	85	51	+34	49.15

Last updated: 21 May 2022
Source: Soccerway

=== Managerial statistics ===
Head coach	From	To	Record							
Head coach	From	To	G	W	D	L	GF	GA	GD	Win %
(Romania) Răzvan Lucescu	27 May 2021	Present	59	29	14	16	85	51	+34	49.15

Last updated: 21 May 2022

=== Super League Greece ===
==== League table ====
Pos	Team	Pld	W	D	L	GF	GA	GD	Pts	Qualification
1	Olympiacos	26	20	5	1	47	14	+33	65	Qualification for the Play-off round
2	PAOK	26	16	5	5	50	24	+26	53	Qualification for the Play-off round
3	AEK Athens	26	14	4	8	42	28	+14	46	Qualification for the Play-off round
4	Aris	26	13	6	7	28	21	+7	45	Qualification for the Play-off round
5	Panathinaikos	26	13	3	10	41	21	+20	42	Qualification for the Play-off round

Source: Super League Greece
Rules for classification: 1) Points; 2) Head-to-head points; 3) Head-to-head goal difference; 4) Goal difference; 5) Goals scored; 6) Play-offs (neutral ground).
(Note: Criteria 6 is only used if needed to decide champion, teams for relegation or teams for UEFA competitions).

=== Matches ===
Sunday, 12 September 2021 1	PAOK	0–1	PAS Giannina	Thessaloniki
19:00 EET, UTC+03:00	Vieirinha (yellow card) 64'; Schwab (yellow card) 84'		86' Conde	Stadium: Toumba Stadium; Attendance: 8,024; Referee: Aristotelis Diamantopoulos (Arcadia); Man of the Match: Stefan Schwab

Sunday, 19 September 2021 2	Asteras Tripolis	0–1	PAOK	Tripoli
20:30 EET, UTC+03:00			27' (pen.) Vieirinha; (yellow card) 41' Schwab; (yellow card) 69' Michailidis	Stadium: Theodoros Kolokotronis Stadium; Attendance: 740; Referee: Evangelos Manouhos; Man of the Match: Alexandros Paschalakis

Wednesday, 22 September 2021 3	Panetolikos	1–2	PAOK	Agrinio
18:15 EET, UTC+03:00	59'		31' (yellow card) 57' Mitriță; (yellow card) 55' Kurtić; (yellow card) 69' Douglas Augusto; 80' Sidcley	Stadium: Panetolikos Stadium; Attendance: 1,258; Referee: Stefanos Koubarakis; Man of the Match: Alexandros Paschalakis

Sunday, 26 September 2021 4	PAOK	2–0	AEK Athens	Thessaloniki
20:30 EET, UTC+03:00	Sidcley (yellow card) 39'; Biseswar 42'; Živković (yellow card) 71'; Kurtić 79' (pen.); Świderski (yellow card) 86'; Esiti (yellow card) 90+6'			Stadium: Toumba Stadium; Attendance: 10,326; Referee: Paolo Valeri (Italy); Man of the Match: Diego Biseswar

Sunday, 3 October 2021 5	OFI	1–3	PAOK	Heraklion
16:00 EET, UTC+03:00	90+1'		15' Świderski; (yellow card) 22' Mihaj; (yellow card) 41' (goal) 71' Douglas Augusto; (yellow card) 44' Živković; 58' Kurtić	Stadium: Theodoros Vardinogiannis Stadium; Attendance: 3,014; Referee: Anastasios Sidiropoulos; Man of the Match: Kurtić

Sunday, 17 October 2021 6	PAOK	4–4	Volos	Thessaloniki
16:00 EET, UTC+03:00	24' (o.g.); Akpom 30'; A. Živković 32', 42'; Esiti (yellow card) 69'; Douglas Augusto (yellow card) 73'; Vieirinha (penalty missed) 80'; Michailidis (yellow card) 81'; Murg (yellow card) 90+4'		13', 54', 62', 82'	Stadium: Toumba Stadium; Attendance: 7,607; Referee: Dimitris Karantonis (Imathia); Man of the Match: Andrija Živković

Sunday, 24 October 2021 7	Olympiacos	2–1	PAOK	Piraeus
20:30 EET, UTC+03:00	22', 31'		Sidcley (yellow card) 16'; Biseswar (yellow card) 44'; Murg 81'	Stadium: Karaiskakis Stadium; Attendance: no fans allowed Referee: Deniz Aytekin (Germany); Man of the Match: Thomas Murg

Saturday, 30 October 2021 8	PAOK	4–1	Apollon Smyrnis	Thessaloniki
19:30 EET, UTC+03:00	Schwab 5' (pen.); El Kaddouri (yellow card) 31'; Świderski 66'; Michailidis 72'; Douglas Augusto 90+4' (pen.)		14'	Stadium: Toumba Stadium; Referee: Aristomenis Koutsiaftis (Arta); Man of the Match: Karol Świderski

Sunday, 7 November 2021 9	Panathinaikos	1–3	PAOK	Athens
19:30 EET, UTC+02:00	59'		13', (yellow card) 82' Akpom; (yellow card) 45+2' Taylor; (yellow card) 53' Michailidis; 85' (pen.), 90+8' Kurtić	Stadium: Leoforos Alexandras Stadium; Attendance: 12,792; Referee: Carlos del Cerro Grande (Spain); Man of the Match: Jasmin Kurtić

Sunday, 21 November 2021 10	Atromitos	2–0	PAOK	Athens
19:30 EET, UTC+02:00			(yellow card) 67' Varela; (yellow card) 68' El Kaddouri	Stadium: Peristeri Stadium; Attendance: 751; Referee: Angelos Evangelou (Athens); Man of the Match: Andrija Živković

Sunday, 28 November 2021 11	PAOK	0–1	Aris	Thessaloniki
19:30 EET, UTC+02:00	Taylor (yellow card) 45+1'; Kurtić (yellow card) 83'; A. Živković (yellow card) 85'		41'	Stadium: Toumba Stadium; Attendance: 12,605; Referee: Bobby Madden (Scotland); Man of the Match: not appointed

Sunday, 5 December 2021 12	Ionikos	3–2	PAOK	Nikaia
19:15 EET, UTC+02:00	20', 34' (pen.), 49'		18' Świderski; (yellow card) 23' Esiti; 60' Murg; (yellow card) 76' Schwab	Stadium: Neapolis Public Stadium; Attendance: 1,265; Referee: Athanasios Tzilos; Man of the Match: Andrija Živković

Sunday, 12 December 2021 13	PAOK	2–1	Lamia	Thessaloniki
17:15 EET, UTC+02:00	A. Živković (yellow card) 7'; Michailidis (yellow card) 9'; Lyratzis 11'; Kurtić 64'		7'	Stadium: Toumba Stadium; Attendance: Behind closed doors Referee: Anastasios Sidiropoulos; Man of the Match: Lefteris Lyratzis

Wednesday, 15 December 2021 14	PAS Giannina	0–4	PAOK	Ioannina
17:15 EET, UTC+02:00			31' (pen.), 63' Kurtić; (yellow card) 59' Murg; 68' Douglas Augusto; 89' Akpom	Stadium: Zosimades Stadium; Attendance: 1,684; Referee: Vasilis Fotias; Man of the Match: Jasmin Kurtić

Sunday, 19 December 2021 15	PAOK	3–2	Asteras Tripolis	Thessaloniki
19:30 EET, UTC+02:00	Akpom 43'; Kurtić 49' (pen.), 90' (pen.); Schwab (yellow card) 74'		12', 60'	Stadium: Toumba Stadium; Attendance: Behind closed doors Referee: Aristomenis Koutsiaftis (Arta); Man of the Match: Jasmin Kurtić

Wednesday, 12 January 2022 16	PAOK	2–0	Panetolikos	Thessaloniki
17:15 EET, UTC+02:00	Kurtić (penalty missed) 10', 29'; Rodrigo (yellow card) 55'; Jabá 90+2'			Stadium: Toumba Stadium; Attendance: Behind closed doors Referee: Spiridon Zabalas; Man of the Match: Lefteris Lyratzis
Note: match was originally scheduled for January 5, 2022 but postponed due to too many COVID-cases at Panetolikos

Saturday, 15 January 2022 18	PAOK	3–0	OFI	Thessaloniki
19:30 EET, UTC+02:00	Crespo (yellow card) 28'; Kurtić 55' (pen.), 76'; Douglas Augusto (yellow card) 57'; Świderski 84'			Stadium: Toumba Stadium; Attendance: Behind closed doors Referee: Vasilis Fotias; Man of the Match: Jasmin Kurtić

Sunday, 23 January 2022 19	Volos	0–4	PAOK	Volos
17:15 EET, UTC+02:00			21' (pen.) Kurtić; 29' Ingason; 64' Sastre; 73' Akpom	Stadium: Panthessaliko Stadium; Attendance: 377; Referee: Anastasios Papapetrou (Athens); Man of the Match: Chuba Akpom

Sunday, 30 January 2022 20	PAOK	1–1	Olympiacos	Thessaloniki
19:30 EET, UTC+02:00	A. Živković (yellow card) 33'; 42' (o.g.); Kurtić (yellow card) 45+1'; Crespo (yellow card) 90+4'		44'	Stadium: Toumba Stadium; Attendance: Behind closed doors Referee: Miguel Garcia Godinho (Portugal); Man of the Match: Sverrir Ingi Ingason

Wednesday, 2 February 2022 21	Apollon Smyrnis	0–2	PAOK	Athens
21:30 EET, UTC+02:00			31' Murg; (yellow card) 33' Akpom; (yellow card) 63' Ingason; 90+2' (pen.) Kurtić	Stadium: Georgios Kamaras Stadium; Attendance: 235; Referee: Anastasios Sidiropoulos; Man of the Match: Theocharis Tsingaras

Sunday, 6 February 2022 22	PAOK	2–1	Panathinaikos	Thessaloniki
19:30 EET, UTC+02:00	Ingason (yellow card) 45+3', (goal) 77'; Kurtić (yellow card) 45+7'; Mitriță (yellow card) 70'; A. Živković (yellow card) 73'; Douglas Augusto (yellow card) 84'; Sastre 88'		6'	Stadium: Toumba Stadium; Attendance: Behind closed doors Referee: Andris Treimanis (Latvia); Man of the Match: Joan Sastre

Sunday, 13 February 2022 23	PAOK	1–0	Atromitos	Thessaloniki
17:15 EET, UTC+02:00	Crespo 57', (yellow card) 66'			Stadium: Toumba Stadium; Attendance: Behind closed doors Referee: Andreas Gamaris (Athens); Man of the Match: Alexandru Mitriță

Sunday, 20 February 2022 24	Aris	0–0	PAOK	Thessaloniki
19:30 EET, UTC+02:00			(yellow card) 57' Soares; (yellow card) 59' Jabá; (yellow card) 84' Douglas Augusto	Stadium: Kleanthis Vikelidis Stadium; Attendance: 9,191; Referee: Felix Brych (Germany); Man of the Match: Alexandros Paschalakis

Sunday, 27 February 2022 25	PAOK	1–1	Ionikos	Thessaloniki
17:15 EET, UTC+02:00	Schwab 33' (pen.); Soares (yellow card) 39'; Michailidis (yellow card) 69'; El Kaddouri (yellow card) 84'; Mitriță (yellow card) 88'		58'	Stadium: Toumba Stadium; Referee: Aristotelis Diamantopoulos (Arcadia); Man of the Match: Alexandros Paschalakis

Wednesday, 2 March 2022 17	AEK Athens	1–1	PAOK	Athens
20:30 EET, UTC+02:00	28'		(red card) 19' Tsingaras; 36' Kurtić; (yellow card) ?' Z. Živković; (yellow card) 89' Crespo	Stadium: Olympic Stadium; Referee: Michael Fabbri (Italy); Man of the Match: Jasmin Kurtić
Note: Match was originally scheduled for January 9, 2022 but was postponed due to COVID-19 outbreak at PAOK.

Sunday, 6 March 2022 26	Lamia	0–2	PAOK	Lamia
19:00 EET, UTC+02:00			Michailidis (yellow card) 22', (goal) 52'; 37' Jabá; (yellow card) 38' El Kaddouri; (yellow card) 89' Paschalakis	Stadium: Lamia Municipal Stadium; Referee: Anastasios Papapetrou (Athens); Man of the Match: Léo Jabá

==== Results summary ====
Overall								Home						Away					
Pld	W	D	L	GF	GA	GD	Pts	W	D	L	GF	GA	GD	W	D	L	GF	GA	GD
26	16	5	5	50	24	+26	53	8	3	2	25	13	+12	8	2	3	25	11	+14

Last updated: 6 March 2022.

==== Results by round ====
Round	1	2	3	4	5	6	7	8	9	10	11	12	13	14	15	16	17	18	19	20	21	22	23	24	25	26
Ground	H	A	A	H	A	H	A	H	A	A	H	A	H	A	H	H	H	A	H	A	H	H	A	H	A	A
Result	L	W	W	W	W	D	L	W	W	L	L	L	W	W	W	W	W	W	D	W	W	W	D	D	D	W
Position	11	7	5	2	1	2	3	3	3	3	3	4	4	3	3	3	3	2	2	2	2	2	2	2	2	2

Updated to match(es) played on 6 March 2022. Source:
A = Away; H = Home; W = Win; D = Draw; L = Loss

== Play-off round ==
The top six teams from Regular season will meet twice (10 matches per team) for places in 2022–23 UEFA Champions League and 2022–23 UEFA Europa Conference League as well as deciding the league champion.

Pos	Team	Pld	W	D	L	GF	GA	GD	Pts	Qualification
1	Olympiacos (C)	36	25	8	3	62	26	+36	83	Qualification for the Champions League second qualifying round
2	PAOK	36	19	7	10	58	33	+25	64	Qualification for the Europa Conference League second qualifying round
3	Aris	36	18	8	10	39	28	+11	62	Qualification for the Europa Conference League second qualifying round
4	Panathinaikos	36	18	7	11	52	26	+26	61	Qualification for the Europa Conference League third qualifying round (Note: Panathinaikos qualified for the Europa Conference League third qualifying round by winning the Greek Cup.)
5	AEK Athens	36	16	8	12	56	42	+14	56	
6	PAS Giannina	36	12	10	14	34	42	−8	46	

Source: Super League Greece
Rules for classification: 1) Points; 2) Head-to-head points (Regular season and play-off); 3) Head-to-head goal difference (Regular season and play-off); 4) Regular season position.
(C) Champions

=== Results summary ===
Overall								Home						Away					
Pld	W	D	L	GF	GA	GD	Pts	W	D	L	GF	GA	GD	W	D	L	GF	GA	GD
10	3	2	5	8	9	−1	11	2	1	2	5	4	+1	1	1	3	3	5	−2

=== Results by round ===
Round	1	2	3	4	5	6	7	8	9	10
Ground	H	A	A	H	A	H	A	H	A	H
Result	W	W	L	L	L	D	L	L	D	W
Position	2	2	2	2	2	2	2	2	2	2

Updated to match(es) played on 17 May 2022. Source: League matches
A = Away; H = Home; W = Win; D = Draw; L = Loss

=== Matches ===
Sunday, 13 March 2022 1	PAOK	1–0	PAS Giannina	Thessaloniki
21:30 EET, UTC+02:00	Murg (yellow card) 19'; Soares (yellow card) 43'; Akpom 90+1'; Crespo (yellow card) 90+4'			Stadium: Toumba Stadium; Attendance: 3,366; Referee: Aristotelis Diamantopoulos (Arcadia)

Sunday, 20 March 2022 2	AEK Athens	0–1	PAOK	Athens
19:30 EET, UTC+02:00			(yellow card) 45+1' Tsingaras; 50' Čolak; (yellow card) 69' Jabá; (yellow card) 45+1' Ingason	Stadium: Olympic Stadium; Referee: Jørgen Burchardt (Denmark)

Sunday, 3 April 2022 3	Panathinaikos	2–1	PAOK	Athens
19:00 EET, UTC+03:00	34'; 64'		70' A. Živković; (yellow card) 90+2' Ingason	Stadium: Olympic Stadium; Referee: Irfan Peljto (Bosnia)

Sunday, 17 April 2022 5	Aris	1–0	PAOK	Thessaloniki
19:30 EET, UTC+03:00	17'		(yellow card) 9' Kurtić; (yellow card) 37' (yellow-red card) 71' Mihaj; (yellow card) 41' Soares; (yellow card) 90+5' Sidcley	Stadium: Kleanthis Vikelidis Stadium; Attendance: 7,902; Referee: Miguel Garcia Godinho (Portugal)

Sunday, 1 May 2022 6	PAOK	1–1	AEK Athens	Thessaloniki
21:00 EET, UTC+03:00	Čolak 27'; Mitriță (yellow card) 58'; Sastre (yellow card) 81'		15'	Stadium: Toumba Stadium; Referee: Georgi Kabakov (Bulgaria)

Wednesday, 4 May 2022 4	PAOK	1–2	Olympiacos	Thessaloniki
19:00 EET, UTC+03:00	Murg 10'; Sidcley (yellow card) 90+3'; Akpom (yellow card) 90+4'		51', 62'	Stadium: Toumba Stadium; Referee: Luís Godinho (Portugal)
Note: match was postponed due to PAOK’s duties in the Europa Conference League

Sunday, 8 May 2022 7	PAS Giannina	1–0	PAOK	Ioannina
18:00 EET, UTC+03:00	77'		(yellow card) 90' Schwab	Stadium: Zosimades Stadium; Attendance: 1,452; Referee: Anastasios Sidiropoulos

Wednesday, 11 May 2022 8	PAOK	0–1	Aris	Thessaloniki
18:30 EET, UTC+03:00	Ingason (yellow card) 44'; Kurtić (yellow card) 65'; Sastre (yellow card) 82'		63'	Stadium: Toumba Stadium; Attendance: 6,932; Referee: Felix Brych (Germany)

Saturday, 14 May 2022 9	Olympiacos	1–1	PAOK	Piraeus
20:00 EET, UTC+03:00	41'		2' Filipe Soares; (yellow card) 50' Kurtić	Stadium: Georgios Karaiskakis Stadium; Attendance: 28,765; Referee: Angelos Evangelou (Athens)

Tuesday, 17 May 2022 10	PAOK	2–0	Panathinaikos	Thessaloniki
20:00 EET, UTC+03:00	Schwab 14'; Akpom 21'			Stadium: Toumba Stadium; Attendance: 7,437; Referee: Ivan Kružliak (Slovakia)

=== Greek Cup ===
==== Round of 16 ====
Wednesday, 1 December 2021 1st leg	AEL	1–1	PAOK	Larissa
21:30 EET, UTC+02:00	64'		(yellow card) 79' Taylor; 90+5'Kurtić	Stadium: Alcazar Stadium; Attendance: ? Referee: Evangelos Manouhos; Man of the Match: Jasmin Kurtić

Wednesday, 22 December 2021 2nd leg	PAOK	3–1 (4–2 agg.)	AEL	Thessaloniki
17:00 EET, UTC+02:00	23' (o.g.); 82', 90+1', (yellow card) 89' (yellow-red card) 90+2' Akpom		62'	Stadium: Toumba Stadium; Attendance: Behind closed doors Referee: Angelos Evangelou (Athens); Man of the Match: Akpom

==== Quarter-finals ====
Wednesday, 19 January 2022 1st leg	PAOK	0–0	AEK Athens	Thessaloniki
19:00 EET, UTC+02:00	Akpom (yellow card) 68'; Kurtić (yellow card) 90+2'; Świderski (yellow card) 90+4'			Stadium: Toumba Stadium; Attendance: Behind closed doors Referee: István Vad (Hungary); Man of the Match: Alexandros Paschalakis

Wednesday, 9 February 2022 2nd leg	AEK Athens	1–2 (1–2 agg.)	PAOK	Athens
19:00 EET, UTC+02:00			(yellow card) 30' Akpom; (yellow card) 37' Sidcley; 90+5', (yellow card) 90+6' Kurtić; 90+7' Mitriță	Stadium: Olympic Stadium; Attendance: Behind closed doors Referee: Andreas Ekberg (Sweden); Man of the Match: Jasmin Kurtić
Note: Match was originally scheduled for January 26, 2022 but postponed due to the bad wheater conditions in Athens

==== Semi-finals ====
Thursday, 21 April 2022 1st leg	PAOK	0–0	Olympiacos	Thessaloniki
19:30 EET, UTC+03:00	Akpom (yellow card) 27'; Crespo (yellow card) 68'; Douglas Augusto (yellow card) 70'			Stadium: Toumba Stadium; Referee: Daniele Chiffi (Italy)

Wednesday, 27 April 2022 2nd leg	Olympiacos	1–1 (a.e.t.) (1–1 agg.)	PAOK	Piraeus
20:00 EET, UTC+03:00	105' (pen.)		(yellow card) 45' Živković; (yellow card) 105+3' Ingason; 109' Čolak; (red card) ?' Douglas Augusto	Stadium: Georgios Karaiskakis Stadium; Referee: Valentin Pizarro Gómez (Spain)
Note: Douglas Augusto was sent off while being subbed off already and sitting on the bench

==== Final ====
Saturday, 21 May 2022 Greek Cup Final	Panathinaikos	1–0	PAOK	Athens
20:00 EET, UTC+03:00	34' (pen.)		(yellow card) 7' Douglas Augusto; (yellow card) 22' Filipe Soares; (yellow card) 90+5' Crespo; (yellow card) 90+7' Kurtić; (yellow card) 90+7' Živković; (yellow card) 90+7' Mitriță	Stadium: Olympic Stadium; Referee: Antonio Mateu Lahoz (Spain)

=== UEFA Europa Conference League ===
==== Third qualifying round ====
3 August 2021 First leg	Bohemians (Republic of Ireland)	2–1	(Greece) PAOK	Dublin, Ireland
21:45 EEST	Coote 23', 52'; Breslin (yellow card) 66'; Talbot (yellow card) 70'	Report	Oliveira (yellow card) 62' (goal) 78'; Tzolis (yellow card) 77'; Kurtić (yellow card) 90+1'; Biseswar (yellow card) 90+6'	Stadium: Aviva Stadium; Attendance: 6,500; Referee: Antti Munukka (Finland); Man of the Match: Oliveira

12 August 2021 Second leg	PAOK (Greece)	2–0 (3–2 agg.)	(Republic of Ireland) Bohemians	Thessaloniki, Greece
20:00 EEST	Schwab 4'; Biseswar 28'; El Kaddouri (yellow card) 76'; Murg (yellow card) 4'; Esiti (yellow card) 90+6'	Report	Buckley (yellow card) 90+2'; Cornwall (yellow card) 90+4'	Stadium: Toumba; Attendance: N/A; Referee: Julian Weinberger (Austria); Man of the Match: Biseswar

==== Play-off round ====
19 August 2021 First leg	PAOK (Greece)	1–1	(Croatia) Rijeka	Thessaloniki, Greece
21:00 EEST	Kurtić (yellow card) 86'; Galešić 90+4' (o.g.)	Report	Gnezda Čerin (yellow card) 14'; Lepinjica 33'; Galović (yellow card) 68'	Stadium: Toumba; Attendance: 8,091; Referee: Jérôme Brisard (France); Man of the Match: Schwab

26 August 2021 Second leg	Rijeka (Croatia)	0–2 (1–3 agg.)	(Greece) PAOK	Rijeka, Croatia
21:00 EEST	Issah (yellow card) 14'; Galović (yellow card) 50'; Drmić (yellow card) 74'	Report	10' El Kaddouri; (yellow card) 16' Taylor; (yellow card) 60' Świderski; 80' (yellow card) 89' Murg	Stadium: Stadion Rujevica; Attendance: 6,722; Referee: Serhiy Boiko (Ukraine); Man of the Match: El Kaddouri

==== Group stage ====
The draw for the group stage was held on 27 August 2021.

Pos	Team	Pld	W	D	L	GF	GA	GD	Pts	Qualification	COP	PAO	SLO	LIN
1	(Denmark) Copenhagen	6	5	0	1	15	5	+10	15	Advance to round of 16	—	1–2	2–0	3–1
2	(Greece) PAOK	6	3	2	1	8	4	+4	11	Advance to knockout round play-offs	1–2	—	1–1	2–0
3	(Slovakia) Slovan Bratislava	6	2	2	2	8	7	+1	8		1–3	0–0	—	2–0
4	(Gibraltar) Lincoln Red Imps	6	0	0	6	2	17	−15	0		0–4	0–2	1–4	—

Source: UEFA
Rules for classification: Group stage tiebreakers

Thursday, 16 September 2021 1	Lincoln Red Imps (Gibraltar)	0–2	(Greece) PAOK	Gibraltar
19:45 EET, UTC+03:00	Torilla (yellow card) 39'; Soler (yellow card) 56'	Report	(yellow card) 45' Michailidis; 45+2' Akpom; 56' Mitriță	Stadium: Victoria Stadium; Attendance: 668; Referee: Rob Harvey (Ireland); Man of the Match: Paschalakis

Thursday, 30 September 2021 2	PAOK (Greece)	1–1	(Slovakia) Slovan Bratislava	Thessaloniki, Greece
22:00 EET, UTC+03:00	Akpom 9'; Mitriță (yellow card) 68'	Report	Green 14'; De Kamps (yellow card) 17'; Medveděv (yellow card) 40'; Henty (yellow card) 86'; Mráz (yellow card) 90+2'	Stadium: Toumba Stadium; Attendance: 7,537; Referee: João Pinheiro (Portugal); Man of the Match: Paschalakis

Thursday, 21 October 2021 3	Copenhagen (Denmark)	1–2	(Greece) PAOK	Copenhagen, Denmark
19:45 EET, UTC+03:00	Grabara (red card) 9'; Lerager (yellow card) 41'; Jóhannesson (yellow card) 52'; Pep Biel 80'; Wind (yellow card) 88'	Report	Sidcley 19'; Michailidis (yellow card) 22'; Živković 38', (yellow card) 82'; Paschalakis (yellow card) 69'; Świderski (yellow card) 83'	Stadium: Parken Stadium; Attendance: 19,552; Referee: Erik Lambrechts (Belgium); Man of the Match: A. Živković

Thursday, 4 November 2021 4	PAOK (Greece)	1–2	(Denmark) Copenhagen	Thessaloniki, Greece
22:00 EET, UTC+02:00	Živković 8', (yellow card) 89'; Świderski (yellow card) 53'; Kurtić (yellow card) 74'; Michailidis (red card) 90+4'; Varela (yellow card) 90+5'	Report	Ankersen 34'; Pep Biel 50'; Stage (yellow card) 77'; Kristiansen (yellow card) 89'; Johnsson (yellow card) 90+1'; Jóhannesson (yellow card) 90+2'; Gabrielsen (yellow card) 90+4'	Stadium: Toumba Stadium; Attendance: 11,166; Referee: Paweł Raczkowski (Poland); Man of the Match: A. Živković

Thursday, 25 November 2021 5	Slovan Bratislava (Slovakia)	0–0	(Greece) PAOK	Bratislava, Slovakia
19:45 EET, UTC+02:00		Report		Stadium: Tehelné Pole; Attendance: Behind closed doors due to COVID-19; Referee: Dennis Higler (Netherlands); Man of the Match: A. Živković

Thursday, 9 December 2021 6	PAOK (Greece)	2–0	(Gibraltar) Lincoln Red Imps	Thessaloniki, Greece
22:00 EET, UTC+02:00	A. Živković 17'; Schwab 55', (yellow card) 57'; Biseswar (yellow card) 83'; Lyratzis (yellow card) 84'	Report	Lopes (yellow card) 80'; Toscano (yellow card) 87'	Stadium: Toumba Stadium; Attendance: 4,648; Referee: Rohit Saggi (Norway); Man of the Match: A. Živković

==== Knockout round play-offs ====
17 February 2022 First leg	Midtjylland (Denmark)	1–0	(Greece) PAOK	Herning, Denmark
19:45 EET, UTC+02:00	Andersson 20'; Onyedika (yellow card) 73'	Report	(yellow card) 36' Mitriță; (yellow card) 42' Schwab; (yellow card) 90+4' Crespo	Stadium: MCH Arena; Attendance: 7,088; Referee: Craig Pawson (England); Man of the Match: Lyratzis

24 February 2022 Second leg	PAOK (Greece)	2–1 (a.e.t.) (2–2 agg.) (5–3 p)	(Denmark) Midtjylland	Thessaloniki, Greece
22:00 EET, UTC+02:00	A. Živković 20'; Crespo (yellow card) 23'; Vieirinha 26', (yellow card) 62'; Kurtić (yellow card) 56'; Lyratzis (yellow card) 90+2'	Report	Høegh 80'; Onyedika (yellow card) 90+2'; Dyhr (yellow card) 101'	Stadium: Toumba Stadium; Attendance: 7,468; Referee: Lawrence Visser (Belgium); Man of the Match: Paschalakis
	Penalties
	Čolak (penalty scored); Sidcley (penalty scored); Schwab (penalty scored); Mitriță (penalty scored); Kurtić (penalty scored)		(penalty missed) Meyer; (penalty scored) Andersson; (penalty scored) Dyhr; (penalty scored) Lind

==== Round of 16 ====
10 March 2022 First leg	PAOK (Greece)	1–0	(Belgium) Gent	Thessaloniki, Greece
19:45 EET, UTC+02:00	A. Živković (yellow card) 45'; Kurtić 58' (yellow card) 79'; Vieirinha (yellow card) 61'	Report	Okumu (yellow card) 2'; Torunarigha (yellow card) 83'; Castro-Montes (yellow card) 87'	Stadium: Toumba Stadium; Attendance: 9,098; Referee: Bartosz Frankowski (Poland)

17 March 2022 Second leg	Gent (Belgium)	1–2 (1–3 agg.)	(Greece) PAOK	Ghent, Belgium
22:00 EET, UTC+02:00	Odjidja-Ofoe (yellow card) 32'; Depoitre 40'; Owusu (yellow card) 71'	Report	Crespo 20'; Douglas Augusto 77'; Čolak (yellow card) 87'	Stadium: Ghelamco Arena; Attendance: 12,388; Referee: Daniel Siebert (Germany)

==== Quarter-finals ====
7 April 2022 First leg	Marseille (France)	2–1	(Greece) PAOK	Marseille, France
22:00 EET, UTC+02:00	Gerson 13', (yellow card) 76' (yellow-red card) 90+4'; Payet 45'; Kamara (yellow card) 90'; Dieng (yellow card) 90+4'	Report	El Kaddouri 48'; Biseswar (yellow card) 73'; Kurtić (yellow card) 90+4'	Stadium: Stade Vélodrome; Attendance: 45,182; Referee: Szymon Marciniak (Poland)

14 April 2022 Second leg	PAOK (Greece)	0–1 (1–3 agg.)	(France) Marseille	Thessaloniki, Greece
22:00 EET, UTC+02:00	Douglas Augusto (yellow card) 65'; Schwab (yellow card) 90+3'	Report	Payet 34'	Stadium: Toumba Stadium; Attendance: 27,648; Referee: Danny Makkelie (Netherlands)

== Statistics ==
=== Squad statistics ===
The squad was informed and the official page of PAOK FC.

As of 21 May 2022

Appearances denote players in the starting lineup, with the numbers in parentheses denoting appearances as substitute.

No.	Name	Super League		Greek Cup		Europa Conference League		Total	
No.	Name	Apps	Goals	Apps	Goals	Apps	Goals	Apps	Goals
Goalkeepers
31	(Greece) Alexandros Paschalakis	34	0	5	0	16	0	55	0
88	(Serbia) Živko Živković	2	0	2	0	0	0	4	0
Defenders
4	(Iceland) Sverrir Ingason	15 (5)	2	7	0	6	0	28 (5)	2
5	(Cape Verde) Fernando Varela	16	0	0	0	6 (1)	0	22 (1)	0
6	(Albania) Enea Mihaj	11 (3)	0	1	0	4 (2)	0	16 (5)	0
13	(Brazil) Lucas Taylor	12 (5)	0	1 (1)	0	6 (4)	0	19 (10)	0
15	(Spain) José Ángel Crespo	10 (1)	1	5	0	12	1	27 (1)	2
16	(Brazil) Sidcley	20 (11)	1	4 (3)	0	6 (4)	1	30 (18)	2
19	(Greece) Lefteris Lyratzis	10 (3)	1	7	0	6 (1)	0	23 (4)	1
49	(Greece) Giannis Michailidis	19	2	1	0	5 (1)	0	25 (1)	2
23	(Spain) Joan Sastre	14 (2)	2	0 (1)	0	0	0	14 (3)	2
24	(Greece) Marios Tsaousis	1	0	0	0	0	0	1	0
Midfielders
7	(Morocco) Omar El Kaddouri	5 (9)	0	1 (1)	0	7 (4)	2	13 (14)	2
10	(Austria) Thomas Murg	17 (8)	4	3 (1)	0	3 (9)	1	23 (18)	5
22	(Austria) Stefan Schwab	16 (17)	3	3 (2)	0	10 (4)	2	29 (23)	5
27	(Slovenia) Jasmin Kurtić	26 (5)	15	5 (2)	2	11 (2)	1	42 (9)	18
8	(Brazil) Douglas Augusto	16 (5)	3	6	0	8 (2)	1	30 (7)	4
51	(Greece) Theocharis Tsingaras	18 (1)	0	2	0	6 (1)	0	26 (2)	0
20	(Portugal) Vieirinha	14 (7)	1	2 (2)	0	10 (3)	1	26 (12)	2
21	(Suriname) Diego Biseswar	20 (9)	1	4 (3)	0	12 (4)	1	36 (16)	2
50	(Portugal) Filipe Soares	9 (4)	1	1 (1)	0	0 (2)	0	10 (7)	1
Forwards
47	(England) Chuba Akpom	19 (15)	7	6 (1)	2	8 (3)	2	33 (19)	11
18	(Portugal) Nélson Oliveira	1 (4)	0	0 (2)	0	2	1	3 (6)	1
14	(Serbia) Andrija Živković	24 (6)	3	6 (1)	0	14	4	44 (7)	7
70	(Greece) Georgios Koutsias	0 (1)	0	0 (1)	0	0 (3)	0	0 (5)	0
28	(Romania) Alexandru Mitriță	13 (11)	1	0 (5)	1	4 (5)	1	17 (21)	3
11	(Brazil) Léo Jabá	7 (5)	2	2	0	0	0	9 (5)	2
29	(Croatia) Antonio Čolak	8 (7)	2	0 (2)	1	1 (5)	0	9 (14)	3
Players transferred out during the season
11	(Greece) Christos Tzolis	0	0	0	0	0 (1)	0	0 (1)	0
23	(Japan) Shinji Kagawa	1	0	0	0	1 (2)	0	2 (2)	0
2	(Brazil) Rodrigo Soares	4 (4)	0	0	0	3	0	7 (4)	0
9	(Poland) Karol Świderski	8 (8)	4	2 (1)	0	5 (5)	0	15 (14)	4
65	(Greece) Giannis Konstantelias	0 (2)	0	0	0	0 (2)	0	0 (4)	0
44	(Nigeria) Anderson Esiti	4 (7)	0	1	0	5 (3)	0	10 (10)	0

=== Goalscorers ===
As of 21 May 2022

Rank	No.	Pos.	Player	Super League	Greek Cup	Europa Conference League	Total
1	27	MF	(Slovenia) Kurtić	15	2	1	18
2	47	FW	(England) Akpom	7	2	2	11
3	14	FW	(Serbia) Živković	3	0	4	7
4	10	MF	(Austria) Murg	4	0	1	5
	22	MF	(Austria) Schwab	3	0	2	5
6	9	FW	(Poland) Świderski	4	0	0	4
	8	MF	(Brazil) Douglas Augusto	3	0	1	4
8	28	FW	(Romania) Mitriță	1	1	1	3
	29	FW	(Croatia) Čolak	2	1	0	3
10	21	MF	(Suriname) Biseswar	1	0	1	2
	16	DF	(Brazil) Sidcley	1	0	1	2
	4	DF	(Iceland) Ingason	2	0	0	2
	23	DF	(Spain) Sastre	2	0	0	2
	20	MF	(Portugal) Vieirinha	1	0	1	2
	11	FW	(Brazil) Léo Jabá	2	0	0	2
	49	DF	(Greece) Michailidis	2	0	0	2
	5	DF	(Spain) Crespo	1	0	1	2
	7	MF	(Morocco) El Kaddouri	0	0	2	2
19	18	FW	(Portugal) Oliveira	0	0	1	1
	19	DF	(Greece) Lyratzis	1	0	0	1
	50	MF	(Portugal) Filipe Soares	1	0	0	1
Own goals				2	1	1	4
TOTAL				58	7	20	85

=== Clean sheets ===
As of 21 May 2022

Player	League	Cup	ECL	Total	Games played	Percentage
(Greece) Alexandros Paschalakis	12	2	6	20	55	36,36%
(Serbia) Živko Živković	1	0	0	1	4	25,00%
Total	13	2	6	21	59	35,59%

=== Disciplinary record ===
As of 21 May 2022

S	P	N	Name	Super League			Greek Cup			Europa Conference League			Total		
S	P	N	Name	Yellow card	Yellow-red card	Red card	Yellow card	Yellow-red card	Red card	Yellow card	Yellow-red card	Red card	Yellow card	Yellow-red card	Red card
18	FW	(Portugal)	Nélson Oliveira	0	0	0	0	0	0	1	0	0	1	0	0
27	MF	(Slovenia)	Jasmin Kurtić	7	0	0	3	0	0	6	0	0	16	0	0
21	MF	(Suriname)	Diego Biseswar	1	0	0	0	0	0	3	0	0	4	0	0
7	MF	(Morocco)	Omar El Kaddouri	4	0	0	0	0	0	1	0	0	5	0	0
10	MF	(Austria)	Thomas Murg	3	0	0	0	0	0	2	0	0	5	0	0
13	DF	(Brazil)	Lucas Taylor	2	0	0	1	0	0	1	0	0	4	0	0
20	MF	(Portugal)	Vieirinha	1	0	0	0	0	0	2	0	0	3	0	0
22	MF	(Austria)	Stefan Schwab	5	0	0	0	0	0	3	0	0	8	0	0
49	DF	(Greece)	Giannis Michailidis	6	0	0	0	0	0	2	0	1	8	0	1
28	FW	(Romania)	Alexandru Mitriță	4	0	0	1	0	0	2	0	0	7	0	0
8	MF	(Brazil)	Douglas Augusto	6	0	0	2	0	1	1	0	0	9	0	1
16	DF	(Brazil)	Sidcley	4	0	0	1	0	0	0	0	0	5	0	0
14	FW	(Serbia)	Andrija Živković	6	0	0	2	0	0	3	0	0	11	0	0
6	DF	(Albania)	Enea Mihaj	1	1	0	0	0	0	0	0	0	1	1	0
31	GK	(Greece)	Alexandros Paschalakis	1	0	0	0	0	0	1	0	0	2	0	0
5	DF	(Cape Verde)	Fernando Varela	1	0	0	0	0	0	1	0	0	2	0	0
47	FW	(England)	Chuba Akpom	3	0	0	3	1	0	0	0	0	6	1	0
19	DF	(Greece)	Lefteris Lyratzis	0	0	0	0	0	0	2	0	0	2	0	0
15	DF	(Spain)	José Ángel Crespo	5	0	0	2	0	0	2	0	0	9	0	0
4	DF	(Iceland)	Sverrir Ingi Ingason	5	0	0	1	0	0	0	0	0	6	0	0
50	MF	(Portugal)	Filipe Soares	4	0	0	1	0	0	0	0	0	5	0	0
11	FW	(Brazil)	Léo Jabá	2	0	0	0	0	0	0	0	0	2	0	0
51	MF	(Greece)	Theocharis Tsingaras	1	0	1	0	0	0	0	0	0	1	0	1
88	GK	(Serbia)	Živko Živković	1	0	0	0	0	0	0	0	0	1	0	0
29	FW	(Croatia)	Antonio Čolak	0	0	0	0	0	0	1	0	0	1	0	0
23	DF	(Spain)	Joan Sastre	2	0	0	0	0	0	0	0	0	2	0	0
Players transferred out during the season
11	FW	(Greece)	Christos Tzolis	0	0	0	0	0	0	1	0	0	1	0	0
2	DF	(Brazil)	Rodrigo Soares	1	0	0	0	0	0	0	0	0	1	0	0
9	MF	(Poland)	Karol Świderski	1	0	0	1	0	0	3	0	0	5	0	0
44	MF	(Nigeria)	Anderson Esiti	3	0	0	0	0	0	1	0	0	4	0	0
