= Filipe Soares (footballer, born 1999) =

Portuguese footballer

Personal information
- Full name: Filipe Miguel Barros Soares
- Date of birth: 20 May 1999 (age 27)
- Place of birth: Lisbon, Portugal
- Height: 1.80 m (5 ft 11 in)
- Position: Midfielder

Team information
- Current team: Nacional
- Number: 22

Youth career
- 2007–2018: Benfica

Senior career*
Years	Team	Apps	(Gls)
2017–2018	Benfica B	5	(0)
2018–2019	Estoril	31	(2)
2019–2022	Moreirense	79	(6)
2022–2025	PAOK	33	(2)
2022	PAOK B	1	(0)
2024	→ Famalicão (loan)	8	(0)
2024–2025	→ Farense (loan)	21	(1)
2025–	Nacional	18	(1)

International career
2014	Portugal U15	2	(1)
2015	Portugal U16	7	(1)
2016	Portugal U17	5	(0)
2017	Portugal U18	5	(0)
2018	Portugal U19	1	(1)
2018–2019	Portugal U20	4	(0)
2019–2021	Portugal U21	3	(0)
Medal record
Men's football
Representing Portugal
UEFA European Under-21 Championship
Runner-up	2021
- * Club domestic league appearances and goals as of 20:59, 18 May 2026 (UTC)

Filipe Miguel Barros Soares (born 20 May 1999) is a Portuguese professional footballer who plays as a central or attacking midfielder for Primeira Liga club Nacional.

== Club career ==
=== Benfica ===
Born in Lisbon, Soares joined S.L. Benfica's youth academy in at the age of 8. On 19 February 2017, still a junior, he made his senior debut with the reserve team, coming on as a late substitute in a 2–1 home win against S.C. Freamunde in the LigaPro.

=== Estoril and Moreirense ===
In July 2018, Soares signed with G.D. Estoril Praia also of the second division. He moved to the Primeira Liga one year later, agreeing to a five-year contract at Moreirense FC.

Soares played his first match in the Portuguese top flight on 11 August 2019, featuring 28 minutes in the 3–1 away loss to S.C. Braga before being stretchered off with an injury. He scored his first and second goals in the competition the following 2 February, in a 5–1 away victory over Gil Vicente FC.

During his spell at the Parque de Jogos Comendador Joaquim de Almeida Freitas, Soares totalled 85 games, six goals and seven assists.

=== PAOK ===
On 25 January 2022, Soares joined PAOK FC for €2.5 million, on a deal running until June 2026. He made his Super League Greece debut for the club on 2 February, playing injury time of a 2–0 win at Apollon Smyrnis FC. His first goal came on 14 May, when he and his compatriot João Carvalho scored in the 1–1 away draw against Olympiacos FC.

Soares helped his team to reach consecutive finals of the Greek Cup, losing both. In January 2024, having taken part in no league matches in the first half of the season (only three UEFA Europa Conference League appearances), he returned to Portugal and its top tier on a five-month loan at F.C. Famalicão.

On 9 July 2024, Soares was loaned to S.C. Farense for one year.

=== Nacional ===
On 22 July 2025, Soares signed a two-year contract with top-division C.D. Nacional.

== International career ==
Soares won his first cap for the Portugal under-21 side on 5 September 2019, playing the second half of a 4–0 home win against Gibraltar for the 2021 UEFA European Championship qualifiers after replacing Sporting CP's Miguel Luís.

== Personal life ==
Soares' older brother, Alexandre, was also a footballer and a midfielder.

== Career statistics ==
As of 20 August 2023

Appearances and goals by club, season and competition
Club	Season	League			Cup		Continental		Other		Total	
Club	Season	Division	Apps	Goals	Apps	Goals	Apps	Goals	Apps	Goals	Apps	Goals
Benfica B	2016–17	Liga Portugal 2	1	0	–		3 (Note: Appearances in UEFA Youth League)	1	–		4	1
Benfica B	2017–18	Liga Portugal 2	4	0	–		–		–		4	0
Benfica B	Total		5	0	—		3	1	—		8	1
Estoril	2018–19	Liga Portugal 2	31	2	2	0	–		4 (Note: Appearances in Taça da Liga)	1	37	3
Moreirense	2019–20	Primeira Liga	33	4	1	0	–		–		34	4
Moreirense	2020–21	Primeira Liga	31	2	2	0	–		–		33	2
Moreirense	2021–22	Primeira Liga	15	0	2	0	–		1	0	18	0
Moreirense	Total		79	6	5	0	—		1	0	122	9
PAOK	2021–22	Super League Greece	13	1	2	0	2	0	—		17	1
PAOK	2022–23	Super League Greece	20	1	3	0	1	0	—		24	1
PAOK	2023–24	Super League Greece	0	0	0	0	3	0	—		3	0
PAOK	Total		33	2	5	0	6	0	—		44	2
Career total			148	10	12	0	9	1	5	1	174	12
