= Giannis Manolioudis =

Greek professional footballer

Personal information
- Full name: Ioannis Manolioudis
- Date of birth: 23 May 2003 (age 23)
- Place of birth: Rethymno, Crete, Greece
- Height: 1.80 m (5 ft 11 in)
- Position: Centre-back

Youth career
- 2016–2021: PAOK

Senior career*
Years	Team	Apps	(Gls)
2021–	PAOK B	19	(0)
2023	→ Veria (loan)	5	(0)
- * Club domestic league appearances and goals as of 17 December 2023

Giannis Manolioudis (Greek: Γιάννης Μανωλιούδης; born 23 May 2003) is a Greek professional footballer who plays as a centre-back for Super League 2 club PAOK B.
