= Alexandros Doris =

Greek footballer

Personal information
- Date of birth: 10 July 1998 (age 28)
- Place of birth: Florina, Greece
- Height: 1.79 m (5 ft 10 in)
- Position: Midfielder

Team information
- Current team: Kozani
- Number: 44

Youth career
- Veria

Senior career*
Years	Team	Apps	(Gls)
2016–2018	Veria	15	(0)
2018	Apollon Pontus	3	(0)
2018–2019	Volos	14	(0)
2019–2020	Apollon Pontus	9	(0)
2020–2021	Episkopi		
2021	Triglia	18	(4)
2021–2022	Xanthi	30	(0)
2022–2023	Iraklis	16	(0)
- * Club domestic league appearances and goals as of 15 June 2023

Alexandros Doris (Greek: Αλέξανδρος Δόρης; born 10 July 1998) is a Greek professional footballer who plays as a midfielder for Super League 2 club Kozani.

== Honours ==
Volos

- Football League: 2018–19
