= Lefteris Lyratzis =

Greek footballer (born 2000)

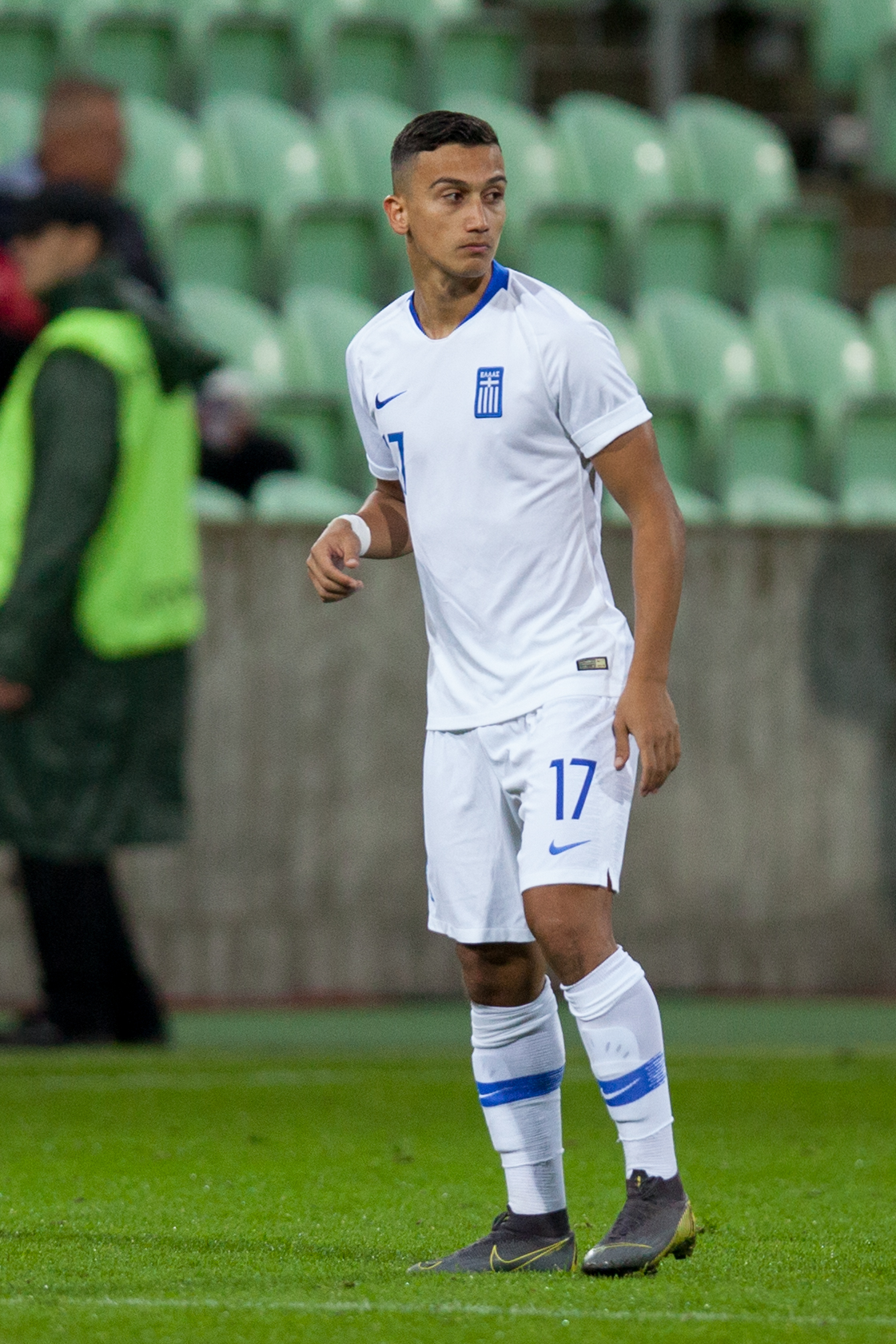
- Lyratzis with Greece in 2019

Personal information
- Date of birth: 22 February 2000 (age 26)
- Place of birth: Kavala, Greece
- Height: 1.78 m (5 ft 10 in)
- Position: Right-back

Team information
- Current team: Atromitos
- Number: 2

Youth career
- 2012–2018: PAOK

Senior career*
| Years | Team | Apps | (Gls) |
| 2018–2026 | PAOK | 40 | (1) |
| 2019–2020 | → Volos (loan) | 24 | (1) |
| 2024 | → Asteras Tripolis (loan) | 11 | (0) |
| 2024–2025 | → NEC (loan) | 16 | (0) |
| 2025–2026 | → Panserraikos (loan) | 32 | (1) |
| 2026– | Atromitos | 3 | (0) |

International career^{‡}
| 2015–2016 | Greece U17 | 14 | (1) |
| 2018 | Greece U18 | 4 | (0) |
| 2017–2019 | Greece U19 | 18 | (0) |
| 2019–2022 | Greece U21 | 12 | (0) |
| 2022 | Greece | 1 | (0) |
- * Club domestic league appearances and goals as of 12 September 2026 ‡ National team caps and goals as of 11 June 2022

Lefteris Lyratzis (Greek: Λευτέρης Λύρατζης; born 22 February 2000) is a Greek professional footballer who plays as a right-back for Super League club Atromitos.

== Career ==
=== Early life ===
He is a son of Kavala footballer Nikolaos Lyratzis.

=== PAOK ===
In the 2017–18 season Lyratzis made 24 appearances scoring 9 goals for the PAOK U20 team which won a title.

Lyratzis joined the first team for pre-season training in the summer of 2018. In the 2018–19 season he played four times for the full senior side, and the next season he went out on loan to Volos.

On 28 June 2019, Lyratzis signed a long-term contract with Super League club Volos on loan from PAOK. On 4 January 2020, he opened the scoring for Juan Ferrando’s visitors after 35 minutes, helping his club to acquire a 2–1 away win against OFI. It was his first goal in the Super League Greece. On 12 December 2021, he opened the score in a 2–1 home win game against Lamia. It was his first goal with PAOK in all competitions with the club.

In the 2021–22 season Lyratzis became a key player from December and was voted the best young football player of the team by his teammates.

On 2 September 2024, Lyratzis was loaned by NEC in the Netherlands.

== Career statistics ==
=== Club ===
As of 14 June 2026

Appearances and goals by club, season and competition
| Club | Season | League | | | Cup | | Continental | | Other | | Total | |
| Club | Season | Division | Apps | Goals | Apps | Goals | Apps | Goals | Apps | Goals | Apps | Goals |
|---|---|---|---|---|---|---|---|---|---|---|---|---|
| PAOK | 2018–19 | Super League Greece | 1 | 0 | 3 | 0 | — | | — | | 4 | 0 |
| PAOK | 2020–21 | Super League Greece | 7 | 0 | 4 | 0 | 2 | 0 | — | | 13 | 0 |
| PAOK | 2021–22 | Super League Greece | 13 | 1 | 7 | 0 | 7 | 0 | — | | 27 | 1 |
| PAOK | 2022–23 | Super League Greece | 14 | 0 | 2 | 0 | 1 | 0 | — | | 17 | 0 |
| PAOK | 2023–24 | Super League Greece | 3 | 0 | — | | — | | — | | 3 | 0 |
| PAOK | Total | | 38 | 1 | 16 | 0 | 10 | 0 | — | | 64 | 1 |
| Volos (loan) | 2019–20 | Super League Greece | 24 | 1 | 3 | 0 | — | | — | | 27 | 1 |
| Asteras Tripolis (loan) | 2023–24 | Super League Greece | 11 | 0 | — | | — | | — | | 11 | 0 |
| NEC Nijmegen (loan) | 2024-25 | Eredivisie | 10 | 0 | 2 | 0 | — | | — | | 12 | 0 |
| Panserraikos (loan) | 2025–26 | Super League Greece | 32 | 1 | 1 | 0 | — | | — | | 33 | 1 |
| Career total | | | 115 | 3 | 22 | 0 | 10 | 0 | — | | 147 | 3 |

== Honours ==
PAOK

- Super League Greece: 2018–19
- Greek Cup: 2017–18, 2018–19, 2020–21
