= Pavel Apetenok =

Belarusian footballer (born 2007)

Personal information
- Full name: Pavel Vladimirovich Apetenok
- Date of birth: 21 March 2007 (age 19)
- Place of birth: Belarus
- Height: 1.93 m (6 ft 4 in)
- Position: Defender

Team information
- Current team: PAOK B
- Number: 15

Youth career
- –2024: Dinamo

Senior career*
Years	Team	Apps	(Gls)
2024–2025	Dinamo	18	(1)
2024–2025	→ Dinamo-2 (loan)	16	(1)
2025–	PAOK B	14	(1)

International career^{‡}
2022	Belarus U15	2	(0)
2022–2023	Belarus U16	10	(0)
2022–2024	Belarus U17	17	(1)
2024–	Belarus U19	10	(0)
- * Club domestic league appearances and goals as of 20 April 2026 ‡ National team caps and goals as of 13 October 2025

Pavel Vladimirovich Apetenok (Belarusian: Павел Апяцёнак; Russian: Павел Апетёнок; born 21 March 2007) is a Belarusian professional footballer who plays as a defender for Greek Super League 2 club PAOK B.

== Early life ==
Apetenok was born on 21 March 2007. Born in Belarus, he is the son of Vladimir Apetenok.

== Club career ==
As a youth player, Apetenok joined the youth academy of Belarusian side Dinamo and was promoted to the club's senior team Dinamo ahead of the 2024 season, where he made eighteen league appearances and scored one goal and helped them win the league title.

Following his stint there, he signed for Greek side PAOK B.

== International career ==
Apetenok is a Belarus youth international. During November 2024, he played for the Belarus national under-19 football team for 2025 UEFA European Under-19 Championship qualification.

== Style of play ==
Apetenok plays as a defender and is right-footed. Belarusian news website Bel.Football wrote in 2025 that he "is more focused on reading the game than on directing the ball... [and] is quite confident on the ball".
