= Sidcley =

Brazilian footballer

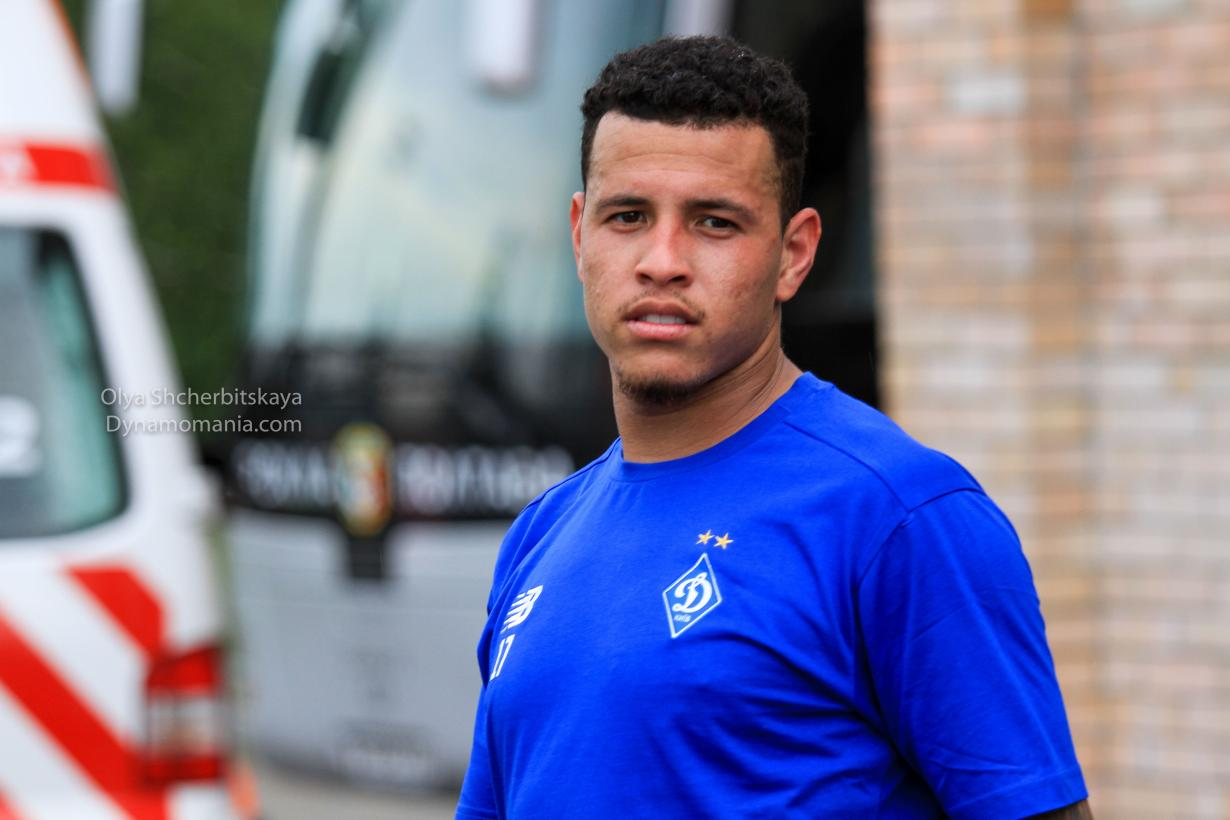

Personal information
- Full name: Sidcley Ferreira Pereira
- Date of birth: 13 May 1993 (age 33)
- Place of birth: Vila Velha, Brazil
- Height: 1.76 m (5 ft 9 in)
- Position: Left-back

Team information
- Current team: Ratchaburi
- Number: 3

Youth career
- Tupy-ES
- 2013: Atlético Paranaense

Senior career*
Years	Team	Apps	(Gls)
2011	Linhares		
2011–2013	Al-Sharjah		
2013	Catanduvense	22	(1)
2014–2018	Atlético Paranaense	125	(8)
2015	→ Atlético Goianiense (loan)	14	(1)
2018	→ Corinthians (loan)	19	(2)
2018–2023	Dynamo Kyiv	26	(3)
2020	→ Corinthians (loan)	9	(0)
2021–2022	→ PAOK (loan)	31	(1)
2022–2023	→ Cuiabá (loan)	7	(1)
2023	→ CSKA 1948 (loan)	9	(0)
2023–2024	Lamia	30	(2)
2025–	Ratchaburi	13	(1)
- * Club domestic league appearances and goals as of 1 February 2026

Sidcley Ferreira Pereira (born 13 May 1993), simply known as Sidcley, is a Brazilian professional footballer. Mainly a left-back, he can also play as a midfielder for Thai League 1 club Ratchaburi.

== Career ==
Born in Vila Velha, Espírito Santo, Sidcley made his senior debuts with local Linhares. After a stint at Al-Sharjah, he returned to his homeland and signed for Grêmio Catanduvense.

Sidcley joined Atlético Paranaense in 2013, initially assigned to the under-23 squad. He made his Série A debut on 3 May 2014, replacing Nathan in a 1–0 home win against Grêmio.

In March 2015 Sidcley was loaned to Atlético Goianiense until the end of the year.

In July 2018, Sidcley signed a five-year contract with the Ukrainian Premier League runners up FC Dynamo Kyiv. He made 33 appearances for Dynamo, scoring three goals and contributing three assists, while he also spent another season back on loan at Corinthians.

On 27 August 2021, PAOK announces the transfer of Sidcley Ferreira from Dynamo Kyiv on loan. The Brazilian left back will wear the number 16 shirt.

== Career statistics ==
As of 2 September 2023

Club	Season	League			State League		National Cup		Continental		Other		Total	
Club	Season	Division	Apps	Goals	Apps	Goals	Apps	Goals	Apps	Goals	Apps	Goals	Apps	Goals
Catanduvense	2013	Paulista A2	—		22	1	—		—		—		22	1
Athletico Paranaense	2014	Série A	7	0	11	0	—		—		—		18	0
Athletico Paranaense	2015	Série A	24	2	4	0	—		4 (Note: Appearance(s) in Copa Sudamericana)	0	—		32	2
Athletico Paranaense	2016	Série A	26	0	12	0	5	0	—		3 (Note: Appearance(s) in Primeira Liga (Brazil))	0	46	0
Athletico Paranaense	2017	Série A	35	6	6	0	4	0	12 (Note: Appearance(s) in Copa Libertadores)	0	—		57	6
Athletico Paranaense	Total		92	8	33	0	9	0	16	0	3	0	153	8
Atletico-GO (loan)	2015	Série B	10	0	4	1	4	0	—		—		18	1
Corinthians (loan)	2018	Série A	11	1	8	1	2	0	5	1	—		26	3
Corinthians (loan)	2020	Série A	9	0	7	0	1	0	4	0	—		21	0
Corinthians (loan)	Total		20	1	15	1	3	0	9	1	—		47	3
Dynamo Kyiv	2018–19	Ukrainian Premier League	17	1	—		1	0	5 (Note: Appearance(s) in the UEFA Europa League)	0	—		23	1
Dynamo Kyiv	2020–21	Ukrainian Premier League	7	2	—		1	0	1	0	—		9	2
Dynamo Kyiv	2021–22	Ukrainian Premier League	2	0	—		0	0	0	0	—		2	0
Dynamo Kyiv	Total		26	3	—		2	0	6	0	—		34	3
PAOK (loan)	2021–22	Superleague Greece	31	1	—		7	0	10 (Note: Appearance(s) in the UEFA Europa Conference League)	1	—		48	2
Cuiabá (loan)	2022	Série A	7	1	0	0	0	0	—		—		7	1
CSKA Sofia II	2022–23	Bulgarian Second League	2	0	—		—		—		—		2	0
CSKA Sofia (loan)	2022–23	Bulgarian First League	9	0	—		4	1	—		—		13	1
Career totals			197	14	74	3	29	1	41	2	3	0	344	20

== Honours ==
Corinthians

- Campeonato Paulista: 2018

Dynamo Kyiv

- Ukrainian Premier League: 2020–21
