= Vasilios Grosdis =

Greek footballer

Personal information
- Date of birth: 17 January 2002 (age 24)
- Place of birth: Thessaloniki, Greece
- Height: 1.81 m (5 ft 11 in)
- Position: Midfielder

Team information
- Current team: Volos
- Number: 17

Youth career
- 2014–2021: PAOK

Senior career*
Years	Team	Apps	(Gls)
2021–2025	PAOK B	84	(4)
2025–	Volos	23	(0)

International career^{‡}
2017–2018	Greece U16	7	(1)
2018–2019	Greece U17	10	(0)
- * Club domestic league appearances and goals as of 20 September 2026 ‡ National team caps and goals as of 9 May 2019

Vasilios Grosdis (Greek: Βασίλειος Γρόσδης; born 17 January 2002) is a Greek professional footballer who plays as a midfielder for Super League club Volos.

== Career ==
Grosdis played for PAOK FC as a reserve from 2013 to 2025.
