= Dimitrios Oungialidis =

Greek footballer

Personal information
- Date of birth: 24 October 1994 (age 32)
- Place of birth: Kozani, Greece
- Height: 1.69 m (5 ft 7 in)
- Position: Left-back

Team information
- Current team: Ilioupoli

Youth career
- Veria

Senior career*
Years	Team	Apps	(Gls)
2014–2015	Zakynthos	24	(0)
2015–2016	AEL Kalloni	0	(0)
2016–2017	Agrotikos Asteras	24	(1)
2017–2018	Veria	11	(0)
2018–2019	Volos	18	(0)
2019–2021	Chania	14	(0)
2021–2022	Xanthi	22	(0)
2023	Makedonikos	9	(0)
2023–2024	Aiolikos	17	(0)
2024–2026	Egaleo	34	(0)
2026–	Ilioupoli		
- * Club domestic league appearances and goals as of 25 April 2026

Dimitrios Oungialidis (Greek: Δημήτριος Ουνγιαλίδης; born 24 October 1994) is a Greek professional footballer who plays as a left-back for Gamma Ethniki club Ilioupoli.

== Honours ==
Volos

- Football League: 2018–19
