= Gustavo Furtado =

Brazilian footballer (born 2001)

Gustavo Santos
Personal information
- Full name: Gustavo Martins Furtado dos Santos
- Date of birth: 14 February 2001 (age 25)
- Place of birth: Rio de Janeiro, RJ, Brazil
- Height: 1.80 m (5 ft 11 in)
- Positions: Right winger; forward

Team information
- Current team: Volos (on loan from Krasnodar)
- Number: 11

Youth career
- Vitória Guimarães

Senior career*
Years	Team	Apps	(Gls)
2021	Maria da Fonte	14	(5)
2021–2022	Trofense	33	(3)
2022–2024	Panathinaikos B	45	(9)
2024–2025	Lamia	21	(6)
2025–	Krasnodar	8	(0)
2026	→ Sochi (loan)	6	(0)
2026–	→ Volos (loan)	5	(0)
- * Club domestic league appearances and goals as of 20 September 2026

Gustavo Martins Furtado dos Santos (born 14 February 2001) is a Brazilian professional footballer who plays as a right winger for Super League Greece club Volos on loan from the Russian club Krasnodar.

== Career ==
On 7 April 2025, Furtado signed a four-year contract with Russian Premier League champions Krasnodar, effective 15 June 2025.

On 19 February 2026, Gustavo moved on loan to Sochi in the same league. On 17 July 2026, he was loaned to Volos in Greece.

== Career statistics ==
As of 21 April 2026

Club	Season	League			Cup		Other		Total	
Club	Season	Division	Apps	Goals	Apps	Goals	Apps	Goals	Apps	Goals
Maria da Fonte	2020–21	Campeonato de Portugal	14	5	—		—		14	5
Trofense	2021–22	Liga Portugal 2	31	3	1	0	1 (Note: Appearance in Taça da Liga)	0	33	3
Trofense	2022–23	Liga Portugal 2	2	0	—		—		2	0
Trofense	Total		33	3	1	0	1	0	35	3
Panathinaikos B	2022–23	Super League Greece 2	18	2	—		—		18	2
Panathinaikos B	2023–24	Super League Greece 2	27	7	—		—		27	7
Panathinaikos B	Total		45	9	0	0	0	0	45	9
Lamia	2024–25	Super League Greece	21	6	1	0	—		22	6
Krasnodar	2025–26	Russian Premier League	8	0	5	1	1 (Note: Appearance in Russian Super Cup)	0	14	1
Sochi (loan)	2025–26	Russian Premier League	6	0	—		—		6	0
Career total			127	23	7	1	2	0	136	24
