= Vasilios Kravaritis =

Greek footballer

Personal information
- Date of birth: 3 April 2002 (age 24)
- Place of birth: Volos, Greece
- Height: 1.97 m (6 ft 6 in)
- Position: Goalkeeper

Team information
- Current team: Olympiacos Volos

Youth career
- 2008–2017: Ermis Volos
- 2017–2018: Eleftherai Larissa

Senior career*
Years	Team	Apps	(Gls)
2018–2021	Volos	3	(0)
2021–2022	Panionios		
2022–2023	Kallithea	0	(0)
2023–2024	Niki Volos	2	(0)
2024–	Olympiacos Volos		
- * Club domestic league appearances and goals as of 31 January 2020

Vasilios Kravaritis (Greek: Βασίλειος Κραβαρίτης; born 3 April 2002) is a Greek professional footballer who plays as a goalkeeper for Olympiacos Volos.

== Honours ==
Volos

- Football League: 2018–19
