= Enea Mihaj =

Albanian footballer (born 1998)

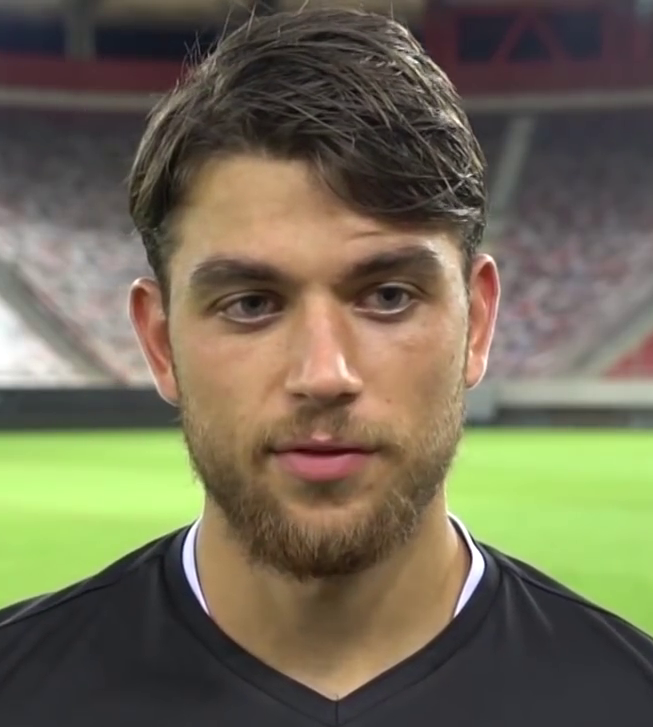
- Mihaj with PAOK in 2020

Personal information
- Date of birth: 5 July 1998 (age 28)
- Place of birth: Berat, Albania
- Height: 1.86 m (6 ft 1 in)
- Position: Centre-back

Team information
- Current team: Atlanta United
- Number: 4

Youth career
- 2011: Olympic Arena Academy
- 2011–2017: Panetolikos

Senior career*
Years	Team	Apps	(Gls)
2017–2019	Panetolikos	45	(0)
2019–2022	PAOK	23	(1)
2022–2025	Famalicão	72	(0)
2025–	Atlanta United	32	(0)

International career^{‡}
2016	Albania U19	2	(0)
2016–2017	Albania U21	2	(0)
2018–	Albania	19	(0)
- * Club domestic league appearances and goals as of 13:17, 15 November 2026 (UTC) ‡ National team caps and goals as of 20:33, 25 September 2024 (UTC)

Enea Mihaj (Greek: Ενέα Μιχάι, born 5 July 1998) is an Albanian professional footballer who plays as a centre-back for Major League Soccer club Atlanta United FC and the Albania national team.

== Early life ==
He was born in Albania and later moved with his family to Thessaloniki, Greece, and then to Rhodes, where he discovered his interest for football. At the age of 13, he was admitted to the Olympic Arena Academy where he stood out with his talent and caught the eye of Panetolikos, who signed him to their academy. At the age of 16, he moved to Aetolia-Acarnania.

== Club career ==
=== Panetolikos ===
Mihaj first suited up for Panetolikos on 14 December 2016 in a 2016–17 Greek Cup match against Kallithea where he was an unused substitute. After two league matches as an unused substitute, he made his professional debut on 11 January 2017 in a cup match against PAOK, coming on as a substitute in the 87th minute in place of Giorgos Mygas.

=== PAOK ===
On 21 June 2019, Mihaj signed with PAOK. On 12 July 2020, he scored his first goal for PAOK in a 1–0 away victory against Olympiacos in the 90th minute.

=== Famalicão ===
On 15 August 2022, Mihaj signed a three-year contract with Primeira Liga club Famalicão.

== International career ==
=== Youth ===
Mihaj received his first call-up to the Albania under-19 team by coach Arjan Bellaj for the Roma Caput Mundi tournament in February and March 2016.

He received his first call-up at the under-21 level by coach Redi Jupi for the 2017 UEFA European Under-21 Championship qualification Group 4 match against Israel on 10 October 2016. He made his debut in the 4–0 defeat, coming on as a substitute at half-time in place of Kostandin Kariqi.

He was called up again to Albania's under-21 side for two friendly matches against Moldova on 25 and 27 March 2017.

=== Senior ===
Mihaj received his first senior call-up to Albania senior team by coach Christian Panucci for the 2018–19 UEFA Nations League C debut against Israel and Scotland on 7 and 10 September 2018. He made his international debut in the 2–0 away loss to Scotland, entering in the last minutes of the match.

Mihaj was named in the squad by the new manager Sylvinho for the opening UEFA Euro 2024 qualifying game against Poland in March 2023, filling in for the injured Ardian Ismajli.

He is selected from the selection board's list of 26 Albanian players to participate in UEFA Euro 2024.

== Career statistics ==
=== Club ===
As of match played 4 November 2023

Appearances and goals by club, season and competition
Club	Season	League			National cup		League cup		Continental		Total	
Club	Season	Division	Apps	Goals	Apps	Goals	Apps	Apps	Apps	Goals	Apps	Goals
Panetolikos	2016–17	Super League Greece	0	0	1	0	—		—		1	0
Panetolikos	2017–18	Super League Greece	26	0	3	0	—		—		29	0
Panetolikos	2018–19	Super League Greece	19	0	—		—		—		19	0
Panetolikos	Total		45	0	4	0	—		—		49	0
PAOK	2019–20	Super League Greece	4	1	2	0	—		—		6	1
PAOK	2020–21	Super League Greece	5	0	1	0	—		0	0	6	0
PAOK	2021–22	Super League Greece	14	0	1	0	—		7 (Note: Appearances in UEFA Europa Conference League)	0	22	0
PAOK	Total		23	1	4	0	—		7	0	34	1
Famalicão	2022–23	Primeira Liga	25	0	6	0	4	0	—		35	0
Famalicão	2023–24	Primeira Liga	18	0	—		—		—		18	0
Famalicão	2024–25	Primeira Liga	29	0	—		—		—		29	0
Famalicão	Total		72	0	6	0	4	0	—		82	0
Atlanta United	2025	Major League Soccer	9	0	—		—		3 (Note: Appearances in Leagues Cup)	0	12	0
Career total			94	1	14	0	4	0	10	0	177	1

=== International ===
As of match played 17 October 2023

Appearances and goals by national team and year
National team	Year	Apps	Goals
Albania	2018	2	0
Albania	2019	0	0
Albania	2020	3	0
Albania	2021	3	0
Albania	2022	5	0
Albania	2023	2	0
Total		15	0

== Honours ==
=== Club ===
PAOK

- Greek Cup: 2020–21; Runner-Up :2021–22
