= Konstantinos Korelas =

Greek footballer

Kostas Korelas
Personal information
- Full name: Konstantinos Korelas
- Date of birth: 1 March 2000 (age 26)
- Place of birth: Karditsa, Greece
- Height: 1.75 m (5 ft 9 in)
- Position: Attacking midfielder

Team information
- Current team: Anagennisi Karditsa
- Number: 21

Youth career
- Anagennisi Karditsa

Senior career*
Years	Team	Apps	(Gls)
2018	Anagennisi Karditsa	1	(1)
2018–2022	PAOK	0	(0)
2018–2020	→ Volos (loan)	6	(0)
2020–2022	→ Karaiskakis (loan)	38	(1)
2022	PAOK B	0	(0)
2022–2023	Trikala	11	(1)
2023–	Anagennisi Karditsa	8	(0)
- * Club domestic league appearances and goals as of 15 June 2023

Konstantinos Korelas (Greek: Κωνσταντίνος Κορέλας; born 1 March 2000) is a Greek professional footballer who plays as an attacking midfielder for Super League 2 club Anagennisi Karditsa.

== Honours ==
Volos

- Football League: 2018–19
