= Kostandin Kariqi =

Albanian professional footballer (born 1996)

Personal information
- Date of birth: 30 October 1996 (age 30)
- Place of birth: Athens, Greece
- Height: 1.83 m (6 ft 0 in)
- Position: Centre-back

Team information
- Current team: Chania

Youth career
- –2015: Asteras Magoula
- 2015–2016: Trikala

Senior career*
Years	Team	Apps	(Gls)
2016–2017	Trikala	6	(0)
2017–2018	Anagennisi Karditsa	27	(0)
2018–2019	Volos	15	(1)
2019	Tirana	0	(0)
2019–2021	Apollon Larissa	44	(0)
2022	Anagennisi Karditsa	9	(0)
2022–2023	Proodeftiki	19	(0)
2023–2024	Rodos		
2024–2026	Egaleo	58	(0)
2026–	Chania		

International career^{‡}
2014	Albania U19	3	(0)
2016	Albania U21	2	(0)
- * Club domestic league appearances and goals as of 21 April 2026 ‡ National team caps and goals as of 10 October 2019

Kostandin Kariqi (born 30 October 1996) is a professional footballer who plays as a centre-back for Gamma Ethniki club Chania. Born in Greece, he has represented Albania at youth international level.

== Club career ==
=== Early career ===
Kariqi started his youth career at Asteras Magoula. In July 2015 he moved to Trikala.

=== Trikala ===
He made his debut with Trikala on 15 January 2017 against Aiginiakos playing the full 90-minutes match in a 2–2 draw.

== International career ==
=== Albania U19 ===
Kariqi received his first international invitation at the Albania national under-19 football team by coach Foto Strakosha for the friendly match against Italy U-19 on 14 May 2014.

He was called up by coach Altin Lala to participate in the 2015 UEFA European Under-19 Championship qualifying round from 12 to 17 November 2014. Kariqi played all 3 matches as a starter where two first matches against Denmark and Portugal he completed the full 90-minutes and in the closing match against Wales he was substituted off in the 62nd minute for Paolo Ivani. However Albania U19 lost all 3 matches with total of goals collected 2–7, where all two goals were scored by Esad Morina of FC Schalke 04 youth.

=== Albania U21 ===
Kariqi received his first call up to Albania national under-21 football team by coach Redi Jupi to participate in the Antalya Cup developed in Antalya, Turkey against Saudi Arabia U23 on 22 January 2016, Bahrain U23 on 24 January, Azerbaijan U21 on 26 January, Kosovo U21 on 28 January and Ukraine U21 on 30 January.

==== 2017 UEFA European Under-21 Championship qualification ====
After having gathered in several friendly matches, Kariqi received his first competitive call up for the 2017 UEFA European Under-21 Championship qualification match against Greece U21 on 2 September 2016. He played against Greece U21 coming on as a half-time substitute in place of Eros Grezda, following a Red card received by fellow Albania U21s defender Silvester Shkalla. Then, in the closing match of the qualification campaign on 10 October 2016 against Israel U21 he played as a starter and was substituted off at half-time for Enea Mihaj.

== Career statistics ==
=== Club ===
As of 15 May 2021

Club statistics
Club	Season	League			Cup		Other		Total	
Club	Season	Division	Apps	Goals	Apps	Goals	Apps	Goals	Apps	Goals
Trikala	2016–17	Football League	6	0	—		—		6	0
Anagennisi Karditsa	2017–18	Football League	27	0	3	0	—		30	0
Volos	2018–19	Football League	15	1	2	0	—		17	1
Tirana	2019–20	Kategoria Superiore	0	0	0	0	—		0	0
Apollon Larissa	2019–20	Super League 2	17	0	1	0	—		18	0
Apollon Larissa	2020–21	Super League 2	19	0	—		—		19	0
Apollon Larissa	Total		36	0	1	0	—		37	0
Career total			84	1	6	0	—		90	1
