= Vladimir Bradonjić =

Bosnian footballer

Personal information
- Date of birth: 11 December 1999 (age 26)
- Place of birth: Priboj, FR Yugoslavia
- Height: 1.72 m (5 ft 8 in)
- Position: Winger

Team information
- Current team: Radnik Bijeljina
- Number: 20

Youth career
- 2014–2017: Radnik Bijeljina

Senior career*
| Years | Team | Apps | (Gls) |
| 2017–2021 | Radnik Bijeljina | 66 | (16) |
| 2021–2024 | PAOK | 0 | (0) |
| 2021–2024 | PAOK B | 32 | (13) |
| 2023 | → Ethnikos Achna (loan) | 8 | (0) |
| 2025–2026 | Olympiakos Nicosia | 44 | (2) |
| 2026– | Radnik Bijeljina | 8 | (2) |

International career
| 2018 | Serbia U19 | 1 | (0) |
| 2020 | Bosnia and Herzegovina U21 | 3 | (0) |
- * Club domestic league appearances and goals as of 17 October 2026

Vladimir Bradonjić (born 11 December 1999) is a Bosnian professional footballer who played as a winger for Bosnian Premier League club Radnik Bijeljina

== Club career ==
=== Early career ===
Bradonjić started his career at FK Rudo before joining Radnik Bijeljina's.

=== Radnik Bijeljina ===
He made his professional debut against Krupa on 22 July 2017 at the age of 17. On 18 February 2018, he scored his first professional goal against Borac Banja Luka.

=== PAOK ===
In January 2021, Bradonjić moved to Greek side PAOK. He won his first trophy with the club on 22 May, defeating Olympiacos in Greek Cup final. On 1 July 2021, Bradonjic moved from PAOK to PAOK B.He made his debut against Niki Volos, scoring a goal in the first game.

=== Ethnikos Achna ===
On 11 August 2023, Bradonjic moved from PAOK to Ethnikos Achna on a one-year loan. In January 2024 he returned to PAOK.

=== Olympiakos Nicosia ===
On 12 January 2025 he signed with Olympiakos Nicosia.

== International career ==
Despite representing Serbia on under-19 level, Bradonjić decided to play for Bosnia and Herzegovina on senior level. He was first part of under-21 team.

== Career statistics ==
As of match played 17 October 2026

Appearances and goals by club, season and competition
| Club | Season | League | | | National cup (Note: Includes Bosnian Cup, Cypriot Cup) | | Continental | | Total | |
| Club | Season | Division | Apps | Goals | Apps | Goals | Apps | Goals | Apps | Goals |
|---|---|---|---|---|---|---|---|---|---|---|
| Radnik Bijeljina | 2017–18 | Bosnian Premier League | 18 | 1 | 0 | 0 | — | | 18 | 1 |
| Radnik Bijeljina | 2018–19 | Bosnian Premier League | 16 | 3 | 1 | 0 | — | | 17 | 3 |
| Radnik Bijeljina | 2019–20 | Bosnian Premier League | 16 | 7 | 1 | 0 | 2 (Note: Appearances in UEFA Europa League) | 0 | 19 | 7 |
| Radnik Bijeljina | 2020–21 | Bosnian Premier League | 16 | 5 | 2 | 0 | — | | 18 | 5 |
| Radnik Bijeljina | Total | | 66 | 16 | 4 | 0 | 2 | 0 | 72 | 16 |
| PAOK B | 2021–22 | Super League Greece 2 | 2 | 2 | — | | — | | 2 | 2 |
| PAOK B | 2022–23 | Super League Greece 2 | 20 | 9 | — | | — | | 20 | 9 |
| PAOK B | 2023–24 | Super League Greece 2 | 7 | 2 | — | | — | | 7 | 2 |
| PAOK B | 2024–25 | Super League Greece 2 | 3 | 0 | — | | — | | 3 | 0 |
| PAOK B | Total | | 32 | 13 | — | | — | | 32 | 13 |
| Ethnikos Achna (loan) | 2023–24 | Cypriot First Division | 8 | 0 | — | | — | | 8 | 0 |
| Olympiakos Nicosia | 2024–25 | Cypriot Second Division | 13 | 2 | — | | — | | 13 | 2 |
| Olympiakos Nicosia | 2025–26 | Cypriot First Division | 31 | 0 | 2 | 0 | — | | 33 | 0 |
| Olympiakos Nicosia | Total | | 44 | 2 | 2 | 0 | — | | 46 | 2 |
| Radnik Bijeljina | 2026–27 | Bosnian Premier League | 8 | 2 | 0 | 0 | — | | 8 | 2 |
| Career total | | | 158 | 33 | 6 | 0 | 2 | 0 | 166 | 33 |

== Honours ==
- Republika Srpska Cup : 2016–17, 2017–18, 2018–19
- Greek Cup: 2020–21
