= Dimitrios Panidis =

Greek footballer

Personal information
- Date of birth: 19 October 2001 (age 25)
- Place of birth: Thessaloniki, Greece
- Height: 1.83 m (6 ft 0 in)
- Positions: Forward; left winger

Youth career
- 2015–2018: Bebides 2000
- 2018–2021: PAOK

Senior career*
| Years | Team | Apps | (Gls) |
| 2021 | → Trikala (loan) | 4 | (0) |
| 2021–2024 | PAOK B | 70 | (10) |
| 2024 | Ethnikos Neou Keramidiou | 13 | (0) |
| 2025 | Panachaiki | 2 | (0) |
- * Club domestic league appearances and goals as of 5 July 2025

Dimitrios Panidis (Greek: Δημήτριος Πανίδης; born 19 October 2001) is a Greek professional footballer who plays as a forward.

== Career ==
=== Early career ===
Dimitris Panidis came to PAOK in 2018 from Bebides. He was, of course, one of the key contributors to the great success of the Under-19 side (53 matches, 21 goals). At the beginning of 2021, he was loaned to Trikala, where he received a «baptism of fire» in Super League 2.
