= Hicham Kanis =

Moroccan footballer

Personal information
- Date of birth: 16 August 1997 (age 29)
- Place of birth: Vimercate, Italy
- Height: 1.80 m (5 ft 11 in)
- Position: Winger

Team information
- Current team: PAOK B
- Number: 30

Youth career
- –2012: Renate
- 2012–2014: AlbinoLeffe

Senior career*
Years	Team	Apps	(Gls)
2014–2016	AlbinoLeffe	13	(4)
2016–2019	Novara	1	(0)
2017	→ Catanzaro (loan)	14	(0)
2018	→ Sion II (loan)	0	(0)
2018–2019	→ Cuneo (loan)	34	(10)
2019–2020	Fano	21	(2)
2020–2021	Renaissance Zemamra	2	(0)
2021	Pergolettese	13	(1)
2021–2023	Panserraikos	41	(22)
2023–	PAOK	0	(0)
2023	→ Panserraikos (loan)	13	(2)
2023–	PAOK B	63	(10)

International career^{‡}
2016	Morocco under-20	3	(0)
- * Club domestic league appearances and goals as of 20 April 2026 ‡ National team caps and goals as of 10 May 2017

Hicham Kanis (Arabic: هشام كنيس; born 16 August 1997) is a professional footballer who plays as a winger for Greek Super League 2 club PAOK B. Born in Italy, he represented Morocco national under-20 football team

== Club career ==
He made his professional debut in the Lega Pro for AlbinoLeffe on 10 October 2015 in a game against Pavia and scored a goal on his debut. On 17 February 2018, Hicham scored a double hat-trick in the opening 36 minutes against Pro Piacenza in a Serie C match, that eventually finished 20–0 to Cuneo.

On 2 September 2019, he signed a 1-year contract with Fano.

After playing for the first half of the 2020–21 season in the Moroccan Botola league, on 22 January 2021 he returned to Italy and signed with Serie C club Pergolettese.

=== PAOK ===
On 16 January 2023, PAOK officially announced the purchase of Kanis, who remained on loan to Panserraikos, with whom he celebrated promotion to the top tier, until the end of season.

== International career ==
Kanis was born in Italy and is of Moroccan descent. He was a youth international for Morocco.
