= Vlasis Andrikopoulos =

Greek footballer (born 1999)

Personal information
- Full name: Vlasios Andrikopoulos
- Date of birth: 26 April 1999 (age 27)
- Place of birth: Katerini, Greece
- Height: 1.83 m (6 ft 0 in)
- Position: Right-back

Team information
- Current team: Anagennisi Karditsa
- Number: 2

Youth career
- Pontioi Katerini

Senior career*
Years	Team	Apps	(Gls)
2017–2018	Eginiakos	19	(0)
2018–2019	Volos	2	(0)
2019–2022	Episkopi	43	(0)
2022–	Panathinaikos B	8	(1)
- * Club domestic league appearances and goals as of 16 June 2023

Vlasis Andrikopoulos (Greek: Βλάσης Ανδρικόπουλος; born 26 April 1999) is a Greek professional footballer who plays as a right-back for Super League 2 club Anagennisi Karditsa.
