= Argyris Darelas =

Greek footballer

Personal information
- Date of birth: 16 October 2003 (age 23)
- Place of birth: Alexandroupoli, Greece
- Height: 1.87 m (6 ft 2 in)
- Positions: Attacking midfielder; winger

Team information
- Current team: Niki Volos
- Number: 26

Youth career
- 2019–2022: PAOK

Senior career*
Years	Team	Apps	(Gls)
2022–2024	PAOK B	51	(15)
2024–2026	NEC	5	(0)
2026	→ Dordrecht (loan)	15	(2)
2026–	Niki Volos	0	(0)

International career^{‡}
2022–2024	Greece U21	9	(0)
- * Club domestic league appearances and goals as of 28 April 2026 ‡ National team caps and goals as of 11 October 2024

Argyris Darelas (Greek: Αργύρης Δαρέλας; born 16 October 2003) is a Greek professional footballer who plays as an attacking midfielder for Super League Greece 2 club Niki Volos.

== Club career ==
On 7 August 2024, Darelas signed a contract with NEC in the Netherlands for two seasons, with an option for two more.

For the second half of the 2025–26 season, Darelas joined Dordrecht on loan with an option to buy.

On 14 August 2026, Darelas signed for Niki Volos.
