= Volos F.C. =

Association football club in Greece

Volos
- Full name: Νέος Ποδοσφαιρικός Σύλλογος «Βόλος»; (New Football Club "Volos")
- Nickname: Κυανέρυθροι (The Cyan-Reds)
- Founded: 2 June 2017; 9 years ago
- Ground: Panthessaliko Stadium
- Capacity: 22,700
- Chairman: Georgios Spiridopoulos
- Manager: Juan Carlos Garrido
- League: Super League Greece
- 2025–26: Super League Greece, 8th of 14
- Website: volosfc.com
Home colours	Away colours	Third colours

New Football Club "Volos" (Greek: Νέος Ποδοσφαιρικός Σύλλογος «Βόλος»), also known as Volos Elabet for sponsorship reasons, is a Greek professional football club based in Volos, Magnesia, Greece. The club currently competes in the Super League, the first tier of football in Greece. Volos plays its home matches at the Panthessaliko Stadium.

== History ==
After years of unsuccessful efforts and negotiations between the two older football clubs of Volos (Niki and Olympiakos) to be merged to create a strong football club for the city, finally in April 2017 discussions and efforts by Achilleas Beos, mayor of Volos, led to the creation of a new football club. It was decided Pydna Kitros to be dissolved and renamed and thus, Volos New Football Club was created, the official presentation of which was held on June 2.

The team, which took the position of Pydna Kitros in Gamma Ethniki for the 2017–18 season, began its preparation with significant transcriptional movements. Volos eventually won first place in Group 4 and 2nd in Group 1 of the Promotion Play-Offs, and they were promoted to the Football League.

In the 2022–23 season, Volos had an excellent run in the Super League, finishing the regular season in fifth place in the Championship, but the inexperience of its players cost them and they finished the playoffs with only one point and a total of nine defeats and one draw. Paolo Fernandes was voted Volos' best player of the season, even though he only played 13 matches.

== Stadium ==
Panthessaliko Stadium

For its participations in the third and second division leagues, Volos NFC used the stadium located in the Neapoli area in Volos, at the edge of Neapoli. Neapoli Municipal Stadium was constructed several years ago, but in the summer of 2017 the Municipality of Volos refurbished it on behalf of Volos NFC who later used it as their seat. It has a capacity of 2,500 tiers, while there is a roof on the northwest side.

After promotion to the Super League, the team uses the Panthessaliko Stadium of Volos, constructed for the 2004 Olympic Games, which has a capacity of 22,700.

== Sponsorship ==
- Shirt Sponsor: Novibet
- Sport Clothing Manufacturer: Admiral
- Golden Sponsor: INTERKAT

== Season to season ==
Season Played	Greek League	Clubs competed	Position finished	Points	W – D – L
2017–18	Gamma Ethniki	13	1st	63	20 – 3 – 1
2018–19	Football League	16	1st	60	18 – 6 – 6
2019–20	Super League	14	11th	31	8 – 7 – 18
2020–21	Super League	14	7th	43	10 – 13 – 10
2021–22	Super League	14	10th	40	10 – 10 – 13
2022–23	Super League	14	6th	40	11 – 7 – 18
2023–24	Super League	14	12th	33	8 – 9 – 16
2024–25	Super League	14	11th	39	11 – 6 – 19
2025–26	Super League	14	8th	32	9 – 5 – 18

== Players ==
=== Current squad ===
As of 15 October 2026

Note: Flags indicate national team as defined under FIFA eligibility rules; some limited exceptions apply. Players may hold more than one non-FIFA nationality.

No.	Pos.	Nation	Player
1	GK	GRE	Marios Siampanis (captain)
4	DF	GRE	Giannis Kargas
5	MF	FRA	Rémy Cabella
7	MF	GRE	Lazaros Lamprou
8	MF	ARG	Maximiliano Comba
9	FW	VEN	Jan Carlos Hurtado
10	MF	POR	Joca
11	MF	BRA	Gustavo Furtado (on loan from Krasnodar)
13	DF	FRA	Quentin Lecoeuche
15	DF	MAR	Hatim Es-Saoubi (on loan from Gent)
17	MF	GRE	Vasilios Grosdis
18	DF	FRA	Ronaël Pierre-Gabriel
20	MF	ESP	Francesc Regis
21	MF	ARG	Matías González

No.	Pos.	Nation	Player
22	DF	GRE	Georgios Mygas (vice-captain)
24	DF	GRE	Konstantinos Lykourinos
27	MF	BIH	Dženis Burnić
28	DF	GRE	Stefanos Katsikas
30	MF	GRE	Alexandros Garavelas
37	DF	MAR	Hamza Mendyl
49	FW	GRE	Georgios Charalampoglou
55	GK	MDA	Alexei Koșelev
72	DF	GRE	Lefteris Tasiouras
82	GK	GRE	Athanasios Papathanasiou-Gerofokas
88	MF	ALB	Keidi Bare
89	MF	GRE	Fabio Refatllari
91	MF	CMR	Yvan Neyou (on loan from Getafe)
99	DF	NED	Derek Agyakwa

== Coaching staff ==
Position	Staff
Manager	(Spain) Juan Carlos Garrido
Assistant manager	(Spain) Ariel Ibagaza
Fitness coach	(Greece) Triantafyllos Ikonomou
Goalkeeper coach	(Spain) Xavi Oliva
Analyst	TBA

Source: Volos F.C.

== Honours ==
=== Leagues ===
- Football League (Second Division)
  - Winners (1): 2018–19
- Gamma Ethniki (Third Division)
  - Winners (1): 2017–18

== Notable players ==
Albania

- (Albania) (Greece) Jorgo Muca
- (Albania) (Greece) Kostandin Kariqi
- (Albania) Sevastian Molla
- (Albania) Alexandros Prifti
- (Albania) Bruno Kela
- (Albania) (Greece) Iakovos Sanaj
- (Albania) Ergys Kaçe
- (Albania) (Greece) Alexandros Tereziou
- (Albania) (Greece) Edi Dajlani
- (Albania) Arlind Xhaferri
- (Albania) Serxhio Ajdini
- (Albania) (Greece) Leonardo Kafexhi
- (Albania) (Greece) Orestis Stavro
- (Albania) (Greece) Diamanti Legisi
- (Albania) (Greece) Marios Sinanaj
- (Albania) Keidi Bare
- (Albania) (Greece) Fabio Refatllari

Algeria

- (Algeria) (France) (Italy) Liassine Cadamuro

Angola

- (Angola) (Portugal) Núrio Fortuna

Argentina

- (Argentina) (Italy) Sebastián Caballero
- (Argentina) (Italy) Marcelo Penta
- (Argentina) Pitu García
- (Argentina) Lucas García
- (Argentina) Joaquín Torres
- (Argentina) (Italy) Franco Ferrari
- (Argentina) Fernando Joao
- (Argentina) Augusto Max
- (Argentina) Brian Sarmiento
- (Argentina) Salvador Sánchez
- (Argentina) (Spain) Fausto Grillo
- (Argentina) (Italy) Julián Bartolo
- (Argentina) (Portugal) Nicolás Martínez
- (Argentina) (Italy) Rodrigo Colombo
- (Argentina) (Italy) Dardo Miloc
- (Argentina) Nicolás Oroz
- (Argentina) (Italy) Jorge Correa
- (Argentina) (Italy) Emiliano Purita
- (Argentina) Enzo Gaggi
- (Argentina) (Italy) Facundo Bertoglio
- (Argentina) Juan Manuel García
- (Argentina) (Paraguay) (Greece) Lucas Villafáñez
- (Argentina) Maximiliano Comba
- (Argentina) Júnior Mendieta
- (Argentina) David Martínez

Australia

- (Australia) (Greece) Steven Havales

Belgium

- (Belgium) (Greece) Alexandros Galitsios

Bosnia and Herzegovina

- (Bosnia and Herzegovina) (Netherlands) Said Hamulić
- (Bosnia and Herzegovina) (Germany) Dženis Burnić

Brazil

- (Brazil) Felipe Pires
- (Brazil) (Portugal) Gustavo Furtado

Burkina Faso

- (Burkina Faso) Ismahila Ouédraogo

Cameroon

- (Cameroon) (Greece) Jacques Alberto Ngwem
- (Cameroon) (France) Sébastien Bassong
- (Cameroon) (France) Yvan Neyou

Canada

- (Canada) (Greece) Alexander Sarakinis

Colombia

- (Colombia) Juan José Perea
- (Colombia) Kevin Rosero

Cyprus

- (Cyprus) Christos Sielis
- (Cyprus) Konstantinos Karagiannis
- (Cyprus) (Panama) Pavlos Korrea

Denmark

- (Denmark) (Montenegro) Luka Racic

Egypt

- (Egypt) Amr Warda

England

- (England) (Greece) Albert Roussos

France

- (France) (Belgium) Anthony Knockaert
- (France) (Senegal) (Mauritania) Harouna Sy
- (France) Alexis Trouillet
- (France) Quentin Cornette
- (France) Lucas Bernadou
- (France) (Cameroon) Leroy Abanda
- (France) Quentin Lecoeuche
- (France) (Martinique) Ronaël Pierre-Gabriel
- (France) (Italy) Rémy Cabella

Finland

- (Finland) (England) (Ghana) Nikolai Alho
- (Finland) Juha Pirinen
- (Finland) (Morocco) Jasin-Amin Assehnoun
- (Finland) Simon Skrabb

Germany

- (Germany) (Greece) Alexandros Kartalis
- (Germany) (Greece) Giannis Kiakos
- (Germany) (Greece) Nikos Melissas

Greece

- (Greece) Vlasis Andrikopoulos
- (Greece) Kyriakos Aslanidis
- (Greece) Georgios Ballas
- (Greece) Konstantinos Balogiannis
- (Greece) Nikos Bourganis
- (Greece) Antonis Dentakis
- (Greece) Konstantinos Dermitzoglou
- (Greece) Apostolos Diamantis
- (Greece) Dimitris Diminas
- (Greece) Stergios Dimopoulos
- (Greece) Alexandros Doris
- (Greece) Giannis Dosis
- (Greece) Tasos Douvikas
- (Greece) Stergios Farmakis
- (Greece) Michalis Fragkos
- (Greece) Thanasis Garavelis
- (Greece) Vasilios Grosdis
- (Greece) Antonis Ikonomopoulos
- (Greece) Vangelis Ikonomou
- (Greece) Theocharis Iliadis
- (Greece) Konstantinos Iliopoulos
- (Greece) Alexis Kalogeropoulos
- (Greece) Vasilis Kalamidas
- (Greece) Giorgos Kanellakis
- (Greece) Fotis Karagiolidis
- (Greece) Tasos Karagiozis
- (Greece) Andreas Kokas
- (Greece) Aristidis Kokkoris
- (Greece) Christos Kollas
- (Greece) Konstantinos Korelas
- (Greece) Georgios Kornezos
- (Greece) Georgios Koutsias
- (Greece) Vasilios Kravaritis
- (Greece) Tasos Kritikos
- (Greece) Giorgos Kyparissis
- (Greece) Alexandros Kyziridis
- (Greece) Pavlos Logaras
- (Greece) Konstantinos Lykourinos
- (Greece) Odysseas Lymperakis
- (Greece) Lefteris Lyratzis
- (Greece) Theodosis Macheras
- (Greece) Theofanis Malakasiotis
- (Greece) Vasilios Mantzis
- (Greece) Dimitrios Melikiotis
- (Greece) Rafail Melissopoulos
- (Greece) Dimitrios Metaxas
- (Greece) Gerasimos Mitoglou
- (Greece) Panagiotis Moraitis
- (Greece) Georgios Mygas
- (Greece) Giannis Mystakidis
- (Greece) (Albania) Sotiris Ninis
- (Greece) Dimitrios Oungialidis
- (Greece) Symeon Papadopoulos
- (Greece) Thomas Papadopoulos
- (Greece) Alexandros Piastopoulos
- (Greece) Sotiris Pispas
- (Greece) Vangelis Pitkas
- (Greece) Achilleas Salamouras
- (Greece) Marios Siampanis
- (Greece) Stathis Tachatos
- (Greece) Marios Tsaousis
- (Greece) Lazaros Tzelidis
- (Greece) Ilias Tselios
- (Greece) Sarantis Tselebakis
- (Greece) Tasos Tsokanis
- (Greece) Athanasios Triantafyllou
- (Greece) Thomas Vasiliou
- (Greece) Alexandros Zeris

Honduras

- (Honduras) Michaell Chirinos

Hungary

- (Hungary) Márk Koszta
- (Hungary) Dániel Kovács

Iceland

- (Iceland) Hjörtur Hermannsson

Israel

- (Israel) (Ukraine) Boris Klaiman
- (Israel) (Hungary) Omri Altman

Italy

- (Italy) (Argentina) Cristian Battocchio

Liberia

- (Liberia) (Greece) Alexandros Zervas

Morocco

- (Morocco) Yahia Attiyat Allah
- (Morocco) (France) Adrien Regattin
- (Morocco) Hatim Essaouabi
- (Morocco) (Ivory Coast) Hamza Mendyl

Moldova

- (Moldova) (Russia) Alexei Koșelev

Netherlands

- (Netherlands) Daan Rienstra
- (Netherlands) Tom van Weert
- (Netherlands) Joeri de Kamps
- (Netherlands) Ian Smeulers
- (Netherlands) (Ghana) Derek Agyakwa

Nigeria

- (Nigeria) Adebayo Adeleye

Peru

- (Peru) (Switzerland) Jean-Pierre Rhyner

Poland

- (Poland) Jakub Kuzdra
- (Poland) Kamil Wojtkowski

Portugal

- (Portugal) Renato Santos
- (Portugal) Alex Soares
- (Portugal) Rodrigo Escoval
- (Portugal) Joca
- (Portugal) André Moreira

Romania

- (Romania) (Greece) Alexandros Mărgărit
- (Romania) Călin Popescu

Russia

- (Russia) Imirkhan Mekhrabov
- (Russia) (Greece) Yuri Lodygin

Serbia

- (Serbia) Miloš Deletić
- (Serbia) Bogdan Stamenković
- (Serbia) (Bosnia and Herzegovina) Ognjen Ožegović
- (Serbia) Nemanja Glavčić
- (Serbia) Ivan Kostić
- (Serbia) Nemanja Miletić

Slovakia

- (Slovakia) Erik Jendrišek
- (Slovakia) Samuel Mráz
- (Slovakia) Dominik Kružliak
- (Slovakia) (Greece) Athanasios Papathanasiou Gerofokas

Slovenia

- (Slovenia) Matic Kotnik

Spain

- (Spain) Carles Coto
- (Spain) Nacho Cases
- (Spain) Juan Muñiz
- (Spain) Sergio Chica
- (Spain) Iker Guarrotxena
- (Spain) Tekio
- (Spain) Alberto Bueno
- (Spain) Paolo Fernandes
- (Spain) Victor Fernández
- (Spain) Javier Matilla
- (Spain) Antonio Luna
- (Spain) Pedro Conde
- (Spain) Nacho Gil
- (Spain) Carles Soria
- (Spain) Antonio Zarzana
- (Spain) Pinchi
- (Spain) Francesc Regis

Sweden

- (Sweden) Simon Lundevall
- (Sweden) (Guinea) Mikael Dyrestam
- (Sweden) (Greece) Nikolaos Dosis
- (Sweden) Daniel Sundgren

Switzerland

- (Switzerland) (Turkey) Levent Gülen

Syria

- (Syria) (Greece) Abdul Rahman Weiss

Tunisia

- (Tunisia) (France) Nabil Makni

Turkey

- (Turkey) (Germany) Ahmet Engin

Uruguay

- (Uruguay) Jean Barrientos
- (Uruguay) Franco Romero
- (Uruguay) (Italy) Nicolás Mezquida
- (Uruguay) (Italy) (United States) Bryan Olivera

Venezuela

- (Venezuela) José Alejandro Rivas
- (Venezuela) (Spain) Juanpi
- (Venezuela) (Colombia) Jan Carlos Hurtado

=== Records and statistics ===
Information correct as of the match played on 26 August 2026. Bold denotes an active player for the club.
The tables refer to Volos' players in Super League Greece, Greek Football Cup, Second Division Greece and Third Division Greece.

==== Top 5 Most Capped Players ====
Rank	Player	Years	App
1	(Greece) Tasos Tsokanis	2019–2026	175
2	(Argentina) Franco Ferrari	2019–2022, 2024–2025	133
3	(Argentina) **Maximiliano Comba**	2023–	104
4	(Greece) **Georgios Mygas**	2023–	91
5	(Uruguay) Jean Barrientos	2020–2024	89

==== Top 5 Goalscorers ====
Rank	Player	Years	Goals
1	(Greece) Vasilios Mantzis	2017–2020	21
2	(Netherlands) Tom van Weert	2021–2022	18
3	(Greece) Tasos Douvikas	2020–2021	14
4	(Argentina) **Maximiliano Comba**	2023–	12
5	(Argentina) Juan Manuel García (Greece) **Lazaros Lamprou**	2023–2024; 2024–	11
