= PAOK B =

Association football team

- Full name: PAOK Thessaloniki FC B
- Nickname: PAOK Vita
- Short name: PAOK
- Founded: 2021; 5 years ago
- Ground: Kalamaria Stadium
- Capacity: 6,500
- President: Ivan Savvidis
- Manager: Stelios Malezas
- League: Super League Greece 2
- 2025–26: Super League Greece 2 (North Group), 5th
- Website: http://www.paokfc.gr/
Home colours	Away colours	Third colours

PAOK FC (Greek: ΠΑΕ ΠΑΟΚ, Πανθεσσαλονίκειος Αθλητικός Όμιλος Κωνσταντινουπολιτών, Panthessaloníkios Athlitikós Ómilos Konstadinoupolitón, "Pan-Thessalonian Athletic Club of Constantinopolitans") is a Greek professional football club based in Thessaloniki, Macedonia.

Founded in 2021, it is the reserve team of PAOK, and currently plays in Super League Greece 2, holding its home matches at the Makedonikos Stadium.

Reserve teams in Greece play in the same league system as the senior team, rather than in a reserve team league. They must play at least one level below their main side, and thus PAOK B are ineligible for promotion to Super League Greece. They also cannot play in the Greek Cup.

== Overview ==
All players will be able to move up and down in the first team, which means that if an injured player wants to prepare better, he will play in the second team and then return to the first team. B Teams will normally participate in all competitive activities. They will not have the right to be promoted to the same category as the first team, but they will normally participate in the playoffs and playouts, but not in the Cup, where they will not have the right to participate. While, of course, if they occupy low places in the standings, they will be relegated like all teams.

== History ==
Founded in 2021, became PAOK FC' reserve team and began to play home games at Makedonikos Stadium. The team is intended to be the final step between PAOK Academy and the first team, and is usually made up of promising youngsters between the age of 18 and 23, with five or six players over that age to provide experience.

The team's first appearance in the Super League 2 came in 2021 at the north group of the division, forming a squad of players that were part mainly from the youth academy and players that were loaned out the last season with small experience in professional football. With the same sceptical the coaching staff was formed the same way, with members from lower structure of the club like Mirosław Sznaucner, Theocharis Komsis and Vasilios Petropoulos finishing in the 8th position.

Last season for Pablo Garcia in charge, PAOK B finished in the 5th position of the table making a great job and promoting young players to the first team like Stefanos Tzimas, Konstantinos Koulierakis and many others. Vladimir Bradonjić scored 11 goals making him top goalscorer of the season for the club and earning a transfer to Ethnikos Achna. The departure of Pablo Garcia left a void at the helm of PAOK B, with Alexis Alexiadis replacing the Uruguayan coach. The "black and whites" announced the start of its collaboration with the Greek coach, who until recently was in the infrastructure departments of Dikefalos.

With a renewed roster, PAOK B' will be presented in the new season 2024/25 in the Super League 2 championship, while within the framework of the changes, there will also be changes on the team's bench. More specifically, on Saturday (20/07), the Dikephalos of the North made an announcement, through which it was announced that the positions of its former coach, Alexis Alexiadis and his direct partner, Thanasis Terzis, are now being taken over by Apostolis Papavasileiou and Dimitris Taxidis. PAOK's announcement in detail: PAOK warmly thanks and wishes a good continuation in their careers to the team's previous coach Alexis Alexiadis and his partner Thanasis Terzis, who took over PAOK B in a transitional, difficult stage and in a demanding process (play offs, play outs) of the championship".

Nikos Karageorgiou returns to the bench taking over the technical leadership of PAOK's second team, after the decision of the black and whites to proceed with the termination of the cooperation with the duo of Apostolis Papavasiliou and Dimitris Taxidis. The coach from Kavala, who has also been on the bench of the first team in the two years 2004-2006, held his first training session at Lola's facilities.

== Facilities ==
=== Stadium ===
Makedonikos Stadium is a football stadium located in Thessaloniki, Greece. It is home to Makedonikos FC and PAOK B.

At the beginning PAOK B was supposed to play at Kaftanzoglio Stadium but "Dikefalos" talk about an unacceptable contract stating that another seat will be sought for the first team. The announcement in detail:

"After the unacceptable final contract sent by the administration of Kaftantzogleio Stadium for signing to PAOK FC, which violates every previous discussion and oral agreement, by order of the president, Ivan Savvidis, PAOK B does not intend to play in Kaftanzogleio. The delay in the sending of the contract, and its sending just 5 days before the start of SL2 with subdued conditions, was done deliberately so that PAOK FC could be trapped. However, the team of PAOK B 'will play at the stadium of Makedonikos and the necessary actions have already been taken for the change of headquarters.

Apollon Kalamaria's stadium will be used by PAOK B' for the 2025/26 season in the Super League 2 championship. The Kalamaria team made the news known with an official announcement stressing that a collaboration between the two Thessaloniki teams is also starting. "Apollon Kalamarias announces by order of the Board of Directors, President Fotis Baltidis, the cooperation that begins with PAOK, after having negotiated and evaluated the benefit of the two big teams of Thessaloniki, Apollon Kalamarias and PAOK. We will host PAOK B in our stadium for their matches in Super League 2. As an exception, Apollon Kalamarias announces that Gate 2 of the Apollon Kalamarias stadium, which is used by his fans and the Rossoneri during the matches played by PAOK B, will remain closed.".

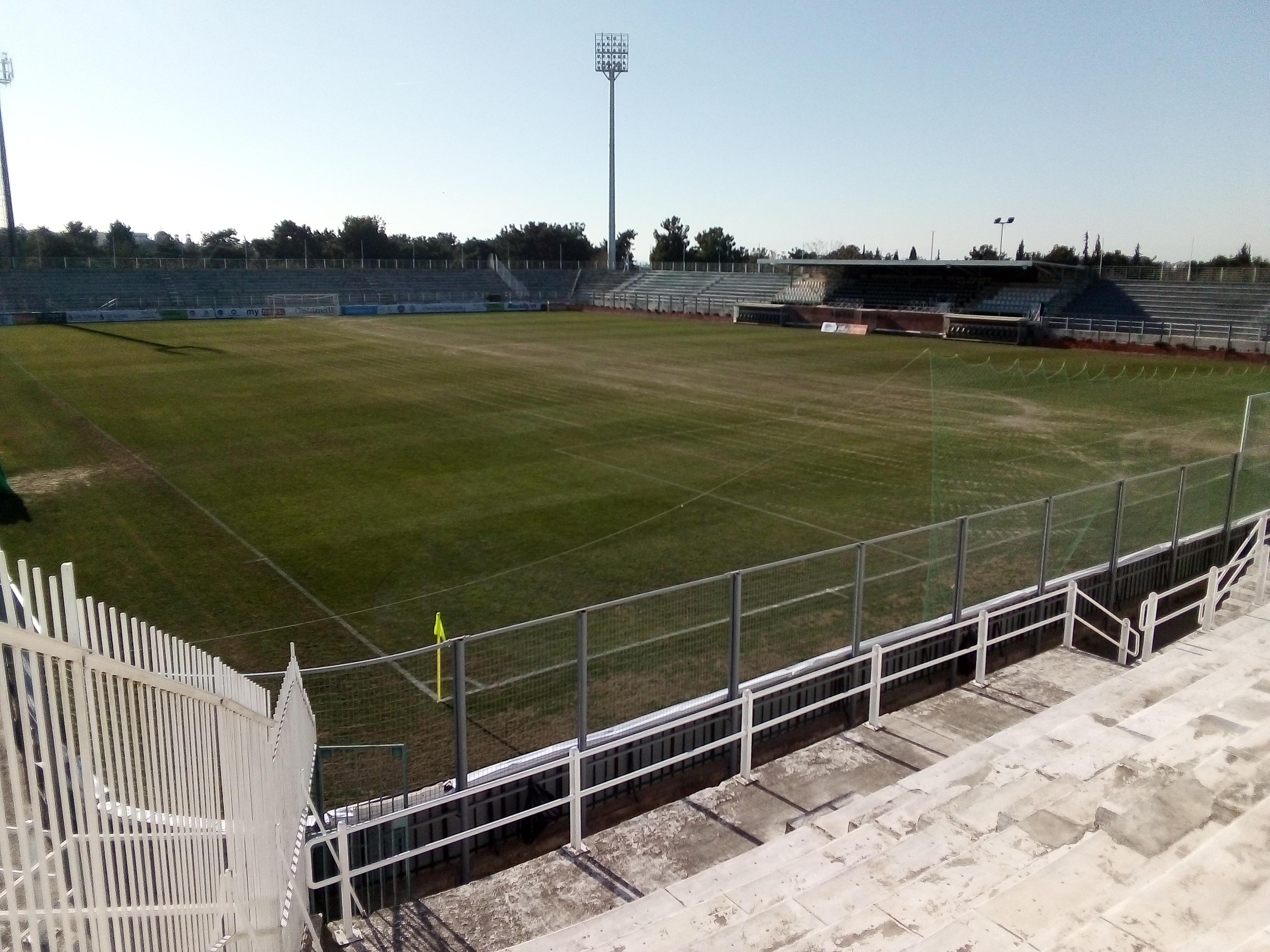
Makedonikos Stadium

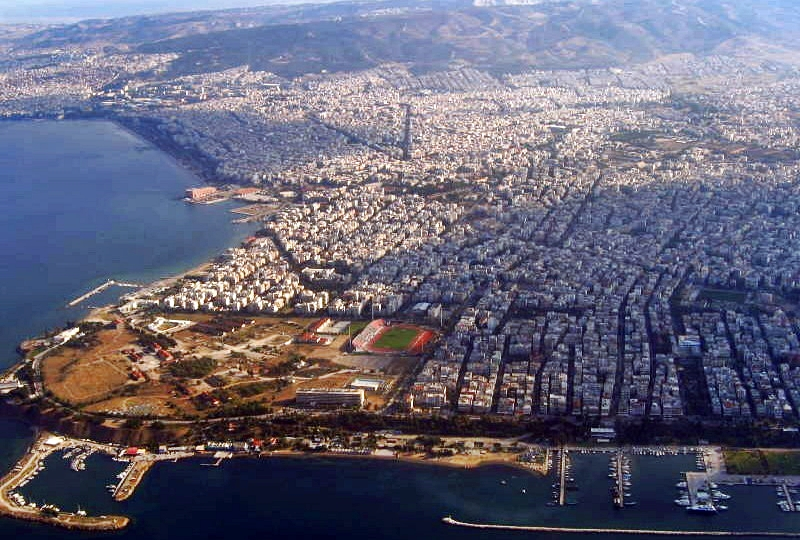
Kalamaria Stadium

=== Training facilities ===
Lola's Sports Center is the training ground of PAOK B, located in Souroti area of Thessaloniki.

== Players ==
=== Current squad ===
As of 31 July 2026

Note: Flags indicate national team as defined under FIFA eligibility rules; some limited exceptions apply. Players may hold more than one non-FIFA nationality.

No.	Pos.	Nation	Player
15	DF	BLR	Pavel Apetenok
30	MF	MAR	Hicham Kanis
33	MF	GRE	Dimitrios Tsopouroglou
36	MF	ROU	Adrian Caragea
37	DF	GRE	Bedri Dunga
39	MF	GRE	Dimitrios Berdos
40	MF	POR	Pedro Biasotto
41	GK	GRE	Dimitrios Monastirlis
42	MF	GRE	Athanasios Leonidopoulos
43	MF	GRE	Vasileios Papageorgiou
44	DF	GRE	Georgios Sideras
45	MF	GRE	Christos Kostoglou
48	MF	NGR	Abasiekeme Ikobong
49	FW	NED	Mark Sifneos
51	DF	GRE	Konstantinos Vyrsokinos
57	MF	MAR	Yassine Azzouz

No.	Pos.	Nation	Player
58	DF	GRE	Vasilios Pasachidis
61	MF	GRE	Giannis Tsifoutis
67	DF	GRE	Pavlos Tsiotas
70	FW	GRE	Vaggelis Gravvanis
73	GK	GRE	Vasileios Tsintsolis
74	MF	GRE	Athanasios Papanikopoulos
78	DF	GRE	Georgios Kosidis
81	GK	GRE	Vasilios Nikolakoulis
82	MF	GRE	Vasilios Eleftheriadis
88	MF	PAR	Axel Galeano (on loan from San Lorenzo)
90	DF	GRE	Dimitrios Kottas
95	DF	GRE	Alkiviadis Avrampos
96	MF	GRE	Ioannis Sarris
97	DF	GRE	Dimitrios Bataoulas
98	DF	GRE	Georgios Koupenos

=== From PAOK Academy ===
Source: PAOK B Squad Note: Flags indicate national team as defined under FIFA eligibility rules; some limited exceptions apply. Players may hold more than one non-FIFA nationality.

No.	Pos.	Nation	Player
38	MF	GRE	Konstantinos Toursounidis
62	GK	GRE	Efstathios Beleris

No.	Pos.	Nation	Player
76	MF	GRE	Evagjelos Gjoka
80	FW	GRE	Paschalis Stylos

=== Out on loan ===
Note: Flags indicate national team as defined under FIFA eligibility rules; some limited exceptions apply. Players may hold more than one non-FIFA nationality.

No.	Pos.	Nation	Player
68	FW	EST	Karel Mustmaa (at Čukarički until 30 June 2027)

== Coaching staff ==
Coaching staff
(Greece) Stelios Malezas	Head coach
(Greece) Savvas Konstantinidis	Assistant coach
(Greece) Georgios Kostikos	Assistant coach
(Greece) Dimitris Kryonas	Goalkeeping coach
Analysis department
(Greece) Ioannis Vlachos	Match analyst
(Greece) Nikos Gialbolakis	Match analyst
Fitness coaches
(Turkey) Mert Isbilir	Fitness Coach
(Greece) Paschalis Elkas	Rehabilitation Coach
Medical department
(Greece) Dr. Argyrios Karavelis	Team Doctor
(Greece) Stavros Terzanidis	Physiotherapist
(Greece) Dimitris Pagotos	Physiotherapist
Sport management
(Greece) Dimitris Sairidaris	Team manager
(Greece) Ioannis Savvidis	Technical director
Carer
(Greece) Vasilis Papadopoulos	Carer
(Greece) Iakovos Galinos	Carer

Source: PAOK FC

== Records statistics ==
=== League performance record ===
Only competitive league matches are counted.

Season	Div	Pos	Pld	W	D	L	GF	GA	Pts	Top scorer(s)	Goals	Notes
2021–22	II	8th	32	11	11	10	41	32	**44**	(Greece) Georgios Koutsias	10	
2022–23	II	5th	28	14	7	7	51	33	**49**	(Bosnia and Herzegovina) Vladimir Bradonjić	11	
2023–24	II	6th	32	15	4	13	52	44	**49**	(Greece) Argyris Darelas	9	
2024–25	II	7th	26	9	6	11	28	29	**43**	(Colombia) Hurtado	11	
2025–26	II	5th	28	14	4	10	44	31	**48**	(Greece) Giannis Gitersos	6	

Last updated: 1 May 2022.

Champions	Runners-up	Third place

=== Managerial statistics ===
Only competitive matches are counted.

Name	Nat	From	To	P	W	D	L	GF	GA	Win %	Honours	Refs
Pablo García	(Uruguay)	July 2021	June 2023	60	25	18	17	92	65	41.67	0	
Alexandros Alexiadis	(Greece)	August 2023	July 2024	32	15	4	13	52	44	46.88	0	
Apostolis Papavasiliou	(Greece)	July 2024	December 2024	14	4	2	8	17	17	28.57	0	
Nikos Karageorgiou	(Greece)	December 2024	October 2025	18	6	5	7	20	17	33.33	0	
Dani Ponz	(Spain)	October 2025	November 2026	32	16	6	10	48	36	50.00	0	

Last updated: 13 November 2026.

=== Records and statistics ===
Information correct as of the match played on 21 September 2026. Bold denotes an active player for the club.
The tables refer to PAOK B's players in Super League Greece 2.

==== Top 5 Most Capped Players ====
Rank	Player	Years	App
1	(Greece) **Dimitrios Tsopouroglou**	2021–	119
2	(Greece) Vassilis Grosdis	2021–2025	84
3	(Greece) **Dimitrios Kottas**	2022–	75
4	(Greece) Dimitrios Panidis	2021–2024	70
5	(Morocco) **Hicham Kanis**	2023–	64

==== Top 5 Goalscorers ====
Rank	Player	Years	Goals
1	(Greece) Giannis Gitersos	2023–2026	16
2	(Greece) Argyris Darelas	2022–2024	15
3	(Bosnia and Herzegovina) Vladimir Bradonjić	2021–2024	13
4	(Colombia) Hurtado (Georgia (country)) Vasilios Gordeziani	2021–2024; 2021–2024	11
5	(Greece) Georgios Koutsias (Morocco) **Hicham Kanis** (Greece) Dimitrios Panidis	2021–2022; 2023– 2021–2024	10

== See also ==
- Category:PAOK FC B players
