= 2021–22 Aris Thessaloniki F.C. season =

Aris Thessaloniki
- President: Theodoros A. Karipidis
- Manager: Akis Mantzios (until 14 February 2022); Apostolos Terzis (from 15 February 2022 until 21 February 2022); Germán Burgos (from 22 February 2022)
- Stadium: Kleanthis Vikelidis Stadium
- Super League 1: 3rd
- Greek Cup: Quarter-finals
- UEFA Europa Conference League: Second qualifying round
- Top goalscorer: League: Aboubakar Kamara (8); All: Aboubakar Kamara (10)
Home colours	Away colours	Third colours

The 2021–22 season was the 108th season in the existence of Aris Thessaloniki F.C. and the club's 4th consecutive season in the top flight of Greek football since their return there. In addition to the Super League 1, Aris were participating in this season's editions of the Greek Cup and the inaugural edition of UEFA Europa Conference League.

== First-team squad ==
#	Name	Nationality	Position(s)	Date of birth (age)	Signed from
Goalkeepers
1	Denis César	(Brazil)	GK	April 14, 1987 (aged 35)	(Portugal) Gil Vicente
23	Julián Cuesta	(Spain)	GK	March 28, 1991 (aged 31)	(Poland) Wisła Kraków
99	Marios Siampanis	(Greece)	GK	September 28, 1999 (aged 22)	(Greece) Olympiacos
Defenders
2	Salem Mbakata	(France) / (Democratic Republic of the Congo)	RB	April 19, 1998 (aged 24)	Free Agent
3	Lumor Agbenyenu	(Ghana)	LB / LM	August 15, 1996 (aged 25)	(Portugal) Sporting CP
4	Fabiano Leismann	(Brazil)	CB / RB	November 18, 1991 (aged 30)	(Turkey) Denizlispor
5	Georgios Delizisis (captain)	(Greece)	CB	December 1, 1987 (aged 34)	(Greece) Apollon Smyrnis
14	Jakub Brabec	(Czech Republic)	CB	August 6, 1992 (aged 29)	(Czech Republic) Viktoria Plzeň
21	Daniel Sundgren	(Sweden)	RB / RM / DM	November 22, 1990 (aged 31)	(Sweden) AIK Fotboll
22	Cristian Ganea	(Romania) / (Spain)	LB / LM / LW	May 24, 1992 (aged 30)	(Spain) Athletic Bilbao
25	Christos Marmaridis	(Greece)	RB	May 25, 2002 (aged 20)	Club's Academy
27	Panagiotis Sengiergis	(Greece)	LB	June 23, 2001 (aged 20)	Club's Academy
29	Yohan Benalouane	(Tunisia) / (France)	CB / RB / LB	March 28, 1987 (aged 35)	Free Agent
44	Kyriakos Aslanidis	(Greece)	CB	March 11, 2002 (aged 20)	Club's Academy
66	Emanuel Šakić	(Austria)	RB / RM / DM	January 25, 1991 (aged 31)	(Austria) Sturm Graz
Midfielders
8	Lerin Duarte	(Netherlands) / (Cape Verde)	CM / AM	August 11, 1990 (aged 31)	(Netherlands) Heracles Almelo
13	Cheick Doukouré	(Ivory Coast) / (France)	DM / CM	September 11, 1992 (aged 29)	(Spain) Leganés
17	Badou Ndiaye	(Senegal)	CM / DM / AM	October 27, 1990 (aged 31)	(England) Stoke City
26	Javier Matilla (vice-captain)	(Spain)	CM / DM	August 16, 1988 (aged 33)	(Spain) Gimnàstic de Tarragona
35	Zisis Saliaris	(Greece)	CM	April 25, 2003 (aged 19)	Club's Academy
88	Lucas Sasha	(Brazil) / (Italy)	DM / LB / RB	March 1, 1990 (aged 32)	(Bulgaria) Ludogorets Razgrad
Forwards
7	Daniel Mancini	(Argentina) / (Italy)	RW / LW / SS	November 11, 1996 (aged 25)	(France) Girondins de Bordeaux
9	Dimitrios Manos	(Greece)	ST / SS / RW	September 16, 1994 (aged 27)	(Greece) Olympiacos
10	Mateo García	(Argentina) / (Italy)	RW / LW	September 10, 1996 (aged 25)	(Serbia) Red Star Belgrade
11	Kostas Mitroglou	(Greece)	ST	March 12, 1988 (aged 34)	(France) Olympique de Marseille
12	Mohanad Ali	(Iraq)	ST	June 20, 2000 (aged 21)	(Qatar) Al-Duhail
15	Juan Iturbe	(Paraguay) / (Argentina)	LW / RW / SS	June 4, 1993 (aged 28)	(Mexico) UNAM Pumas
16	Bruno Gama	(Portugal)	RW / LW / SS	November 15, 1987 (aged 34)	(Spain) Alcorcón
18	Facundo Bertoglio	(Argentina) / (Italy)	LW / RW / SS	June 30, 1990 (aged 31)	(Argentina) Aldosivi
19	Cristian López	(Spain)	ST	April 27, 1989 (aged 33)	(Spain) Las Palmas
20	Izet Hajrović	(Bosnia and Herzegovina) / (Switzerland)	LW / RW / AM	August 4, 1991 (aged 30)	(Croatia) Dinamo Zagreb
47	Aboubakar Kamara	(Mauritania) / (France)	ST / RW / LW	March 7, 1995 (aged 27)	(England) Fulham
50	Luis Palma	(Honduras)	LW / ST / AM	January 17, 2000 (aged 22)	(Honduras) Vida

== Transfers and loans ==
=== Transfers in ===
Entry date	Position	No.	Player	From club	Fee	Ref.
June 2021	FW	20	(Bosnia and Herzegovina) / (Switzerland) Izet Hajrović	(Croatia) Dinamo Zagreb	Free	
July 2021	GK	1	(Brazil) Denis César	(Portugal) Gil Vicente	Free	
July 2021	DF	4	(Brazil) Fabiano Leismann	(Turkey) Denizlispor	Free	
July 2021	MF	17	(Senegal) Badou Ndiaye	(England) Stoke City	Free	
July 2021	DF	3	(Ghana) Lumor Agbenyenu	(Portugal) Sporting CP	Free	
August 2021	FW	15	(Paraguay) / (Argentina) Juan Iturbe	(Mexico) UNAM Pumas	Free	
August 2021	FW	47	(Mauritania) / (France) Aboubakar Kamara	(England) Fulham	3.500.000 €	
August 2021	DF	14	(Czech Republic) Jakub Brabec	(Czech Republic) Viktoria Plzeň	Free	
January 2022	FW	50	(Honduras) Luis Palma	(Honduras) Vida	200.000 €	
January 2022	MF	13	(Ivory Coast) / (France) Cheick Doukouré	(Spain) Leganés	Free	
February 2022	DF	2	(France) / (Democratic Republic of the Congo) Salem Mbakata	Free Agent	Free	

=== Transfers out ===
Exit date	Position	No.	Player	To club	Fee	Ref.
June 2021	DF	4	(Croatia) Toni Datković	(United States) Real Salt Lake	120.000 €	
June 2021	GK	30	(France) Zacharie Boucher	Free Agent	Released	
June 2021	MF	20	(Albania) Ergys Kaçe	Free Agent	Released	
June 2021	DF	92	(Mauritius) / (France) Lindsay Rose	(Poland) Legia Warsaw	600.000 €	
June 2021	DF	40	(Greece) Petros Bagalianis	Free Agent	Released	
June 2021	MF	38	(Greece) Petros Bakoutsis	Free Agent	Released	
August 2021	DF	3	(Greece) Apostolos Martinis	(Greece) Panathinaikos B	Released	
August 2021	FW	77	(Brazil) Bruno Felipe	(Moldova) Sheriff Tiraspol	Released	
January 2022	FW	33	(Greece) Konstantinos Chatzipirpiridis	(Greece) Iraklis	Released	
January 2022	MF	6	(Australia) / (England) James Jeggo	(Belgium) Eupen	Released	

=== Loans in ===
Start date	End date	Position	No.	Player	From club	Fee	Ref.
August 2021	June 2022	FW	12	(Iraq) Mohanad Ali	(Qatar) Al-Duhail	None	

=== Loans out ===
Start date	End date	Position	No.	Player	To club	Fee	Ref.
January 2021	December 2021	MF	34	(North Macedonia) Ali Adem	(North Macedonia) Shkupi	None	
August 2021	June 2022	DF	31	(Greece) Panagiotis Tsagalidis	(Greece) Kalamata	None	
August 2021	December 2021	DF	44	(Greece) Kyriakos Aslanidis	(Greece) Olympiacos Volos	None	
August 2021	December 2021	FW	33	(Greece) Konstantinos Chatzipirpiridis	(Greece) Olympiacos Volos	None	
January 2022	June 2022	MF	34	(North Macedonia) Ali Adem	(Greece) Veria	None	

=== Transfer summary ===
Spending

Summer: ▼3.500.000 €

Winter: ▼200.000 €

Total: ▼3.700.000 €

Income

Summer: ▲720.000 €

Winter: 0 €

Total: ▲720.000 €

Net Expenditure

Summer: ▼2.780.000 €

Winter: ▼200.000 €

Total: ▼2.980.000 €

== Pre-season friendlies ==
1 July 2021 Friendly	Crvena zvezda	2 – 1	Aris Thessaloniki	Söchau
19:00	Srđan Babić 59'; Guélor Kanga 81' (pen.)	(in Greek)	Facundo Bertoglio 78' (pen.)	Stadium: Venue Kräuterdorfstadion Söchau

4 July 2021 Friendly	Hajduk Split	3 – 1	Aris Thessaloniki	Odranci
18:30	Marko Livaja 7'; Jairo 72'; Marin Ljubičić 78'	(in Greek)	Konstantinos Chatzipirpiridis 23'	Stadium: Venue Športni park

7 July 2021 Friendly	Lokomotiv Moscow	1 – 2	Aris Thessaloniki	Bad Waltersdorf
20:00	Maciej Rybus 4'	(in Greek)	Mateo García 56'; Bruno Gama 61'	Stadium: Venue Thermenstadion

21 July 2021 Friendly	Olympiacos	3 – 0	Aris Thessaloniki	Piraeus
21:00	Mady Camara 37'; Yann M'Vila 42'; Lazar Ranđelović 78'	(in Greek)		Stadium: Karaiskakis Stadium

10 August 2021 Friendly	Aris Thessaloniki	0 – 0	AEL	Thessaloniki
20:00		(in Greek)		Stadium: Kleanthis Vikelidis Stadium

14 August 2021 Friendly	Aris Thessaloniki	4 – 3	Volos	Thessaloniki
20:00	Fabiano Leismann 20'; Facundo Bertoglio 27'; Bruno Gama 49' (pen.); Javier Matilla 90' (pen.)	(in Greek)	Emiliano_Purita 43'; Julián Bartolo 45'; Alexandros Tereziou 79'	Stadium: Kleanthis Vikelidis Stadium

21 August 2021 Friendly	Aris Thessaloniki	4 – 1	PAS Giannina	Thessaloniki
20:30	Aboubakar Kamara 38'; Fabiano Leismann 44'; Mateo García 55'; Juan Iturbe 61'	(in Greek)	Manolis Saliakas 45'; Giannis Kargas (red card) 68'	Stadium: Kleanthis Vikelidis Stadium

28 August 2021 Friendly	Aris Thessaloniki	1 – 1	Lamia	Thessaloniki
20:00	Kyriakos Aslanidis 90+8'	(in Greek)	Lucas Sasha 70' (o.g.)	Stadium: Kleanthis Vikelidis Stadium

3 September 2021 Friendly	Aris Thessaloniki	1 – 1	Olympiacos	Thessaloniki
20:00	Mateo García 38'	(in Greek)	Avraam Papadopoulos 80'	Stadium: Kleanthis Vikelidis Stadium

== Competitions ==
=== Overall ===
Competition	Started round	Current position / round	Final position / round	First match	Last match
Super League 1	Matchday 1	—	3rd	13 September 2021	17 May 2022
Regular Season	Matchday 1	—	4th	13 September 2021	6 March 2022
Play-off Round	Matchday 1	—	3rd	13 March 2022	17 May 2022
Greek Cup	Round of 16	—	Quarter-finals	1 December 2021	26 January 2022
UEFA Europa Conference League	Second qualifying round	—	Second qualifying round	22 July 2021	29 July 2021

Updated to match played 17 May 2022
Source: Competitions

=== Overview ===
Competition	Record							
Competition	G	W	D	L	GF	GA	GD	Win %
Super League 1	36	18	8	10	39	28	+11	50.00
Greek Cup	4	2	1	1	5	2	+3	50.00
UEFA Europa Conference League	2	1	0	1	2	3	−1	50.00
Total	42	21	9	12	46	33	+13	50.00

Updated to match played 17 May 2022
Source: Competitions

Super League 1	Record							
Super League 1	G	W	D	L	GF	GA	GD	Win %
Regular Season	26	13	6	7	28	21	+7	50.00
Play-off Round	10	5	2	3	11	7	+4	50.00
Total	36	18	8	10	39	28	+11	50.00

Updated to match played 17 May 2022
Source: Competitions

==== Managers' Overview ====
===== Akis Mantzios =====
Competition	Record							
Competition	G	W	D	L	GF	GA	GD	Win %
Super League 1	22	10	5	7	21	20	+1	45.45
Greek Cup	4	2	1	1	5	2	+3	50.00
UEFA Europa Conference League	2	1	0	1	2	3	−1	50.00
Total	28	13	6	9	28	25	+3	46.43

Updated to match played 14 February 2022
Source: Competitions

===== Apostolos Terzis =====
Competition	Record							
Competition	G	W	D	L	GF	GA	GD	Win %
Super League 1	1	0	1	0	0	0	+0	0.00
Greek Cup	0	0	0	0	0	0	+0	—
UEFA Europa Conference League	0	0	0	0	0	0	+0	—
Total	1	0	1	0	0	0	+0	0.00

Updated to match played 21 February 2022
Source: Competitions

===== Germán Burgos =====
Competition	Record							
Competition	G	W	D	L	GF	GA	GD	Win %
Super League 1	13	8	2	3	18	8	+10	61.54
Greek Cup	0	0	0	0	0	0	+0	—
UEFA Europa Conference League	0	0	0	0	0	0	+0	—
Total	13	8	2	3	18	8	+10	61.54

Updated to match played 17 May 2022
Source: Competitions

=== Super League 1 ===
==== Regular season ====
===== League table =====
Pos	Team	Pld	W	D	L	GF	GA	GD	Pts	Qualification
2	PAOK	26	16	5	5	50	24	+26	53	Qualification for the Play-off round
3	AEK Athens	26	14	4	8	42	28	+14	46	Qualification for the Play-off round
4	Aris	26	13	6	7	28	21	+7	45	Qualification for the Play-off round
5	Panathinaikos	26	13	3	10	41	21	+20	42	Qualification for the Play-off round
6	PAS Giannina	26	11	7	8	28	24	+4	40	Qualification for the Play-off round

Source: Super League Greece
Rules for classification: 1) Points; 2) Head-to-head points; 3) Head-to-head goal difference; 4) Goal difference; 5) Goals scored; 6) Play-offs (neutral ground).
(Note: Criteria 6 is only used if needed to decide champion, teams for relegation or teams for UEFA competitions).

===== Results summary =====
Overall								Home						Away					
Pld	W	D	L	GF	GA	GD	Pts	W	D	L	GF	GA	GD	W	D	L	GF	GA	GD
26	13	6	7	28	21	+7	45	7	4	2	15	10	+5	6	2	5	13	11	+2

Last updated: 6 March 2022.

===== Results by matchday =====
Matchday	1	2	3	4	5	6	7	8	9	10	11	12	13	14	15	16	17	18	19	20	21	22	23	24	25	26
Ground	H	A	H	A	H	A	H	A	A	H	A	H	A	A	H	A	H	A	H	A	H	H	A	H	A	H
Result	D	L	W	W	D	W	W	L	W	L	W	W	L	D	W	L	W	D	D	W	W	L	L	D	W	W
Position	5	11	7	6	6	5	3	4	4	4	3	3	3	4	4	5	4	4	5	4	3	4	4	4	4	4

Updated to match(es) played on 22 February 2022. Source:
A = Away; H = Home; W = Win; D = Draw; L = Loss; P = Postponed

===== Matches =====
13 September 2021 1	Aris Thessaloniki	0 – 0	OFI	Thessaloniki
19:30 EET	Aboubakar Kamara (yellow card) 90+2'	Report	Triantafyllos Pasalidis (yellow card) 32'; Apostolos Diamantis (yellow card) 61'; Felipe Gallegos (yellow card) 73'	Stadium: Kleanthis Vikelidis Stadium; Attendance: 9.478; Referee: Athanasios Tzilos

17 September 2021 2	Ionikos	1 – 0	Aris Thessaloniki	Piraeus
19:00 EET	Dálcio (yellow card) 12'; Reinaldo Lenis (yellow card) 23'; Giannis Gotsoulias (yellow card) 25'; Aias Aosman 86'; Jerson Cabral (yellow card) 88'; Lefteris Choutesiotis (yellow card) 90+5'	Report	Lucas Sasha (yellow card) 67'	Stadium: Neapoli Stadium; Attendance: 769; Referee: Aristomenis Koutsiavtis

22 September 2021 3	Aris Thessaloniki	1 – 0	Panathinaikos	Thessaloniki
20:30 EET	Aboubakar Kamara 10', (yellow card) 86'; Badou Ndiaye (yellow card) 61'; Fabiano Leismann (yellow card) 67'; Daniel Mancini (yellow card) 82'; Daniel Sundgren (yellow card) 90+4'	Report	Rubén Pérez (yellow card) 86'; Juankar (yellow card) 90+3'	Stadium: Kleanthis Vikelidis Stadium; Attendance: 9.259; Referee: Anastasios Papapetrou

27 September 2021 4	Atromitos	1 – 3	Aris Thessaloniki	Athens
19:30 EET	Srdjan Spiridonovic 45+3'; Dani Castellano (yellow card) 53'; Kyriakos Papadopoulos (yellow card) 59'; Konstantinos Kotsopoulos (yellow card) 83'	Report	Daniel Mancini 10', (yellow card) 19'; Bruno Gama 60' (pen.); Mateo García 65'	Stadium: Peristeri Stadium; Attendance: 821; Referee: Konstantinos Perrakis

2 October 2021 5	Aris Thessaloniki	0 – 0	Apollon Smyrnis	Thessaloniki
20:30 EET	James Jeggo (yellow card) 24'; Badou Ndiaye (yellow card) 87'; Cristian Ganea (yellow card) 90+4'	Report	Andoni Fatjon (yellow card) 32'; Vykintas Slivka (yellow card) 81'; Bruno Alves (yellow card) 85'	Stadium: Kleanthis Vikelidis Stadium; Attendance: 8.640; Referee: Aristotelis Diamantopoulos

18 October 2021 6	Lamia	0 – 1	Aris Thessaloniki	Lamia
19:30 EET	Danny Bejarano (yellow card) 29'; Christos Eleftheriadis (red card) 37'; Theofanis Tzandaris (yellow card) 64'	Report	Javier Matilla (yellow card) 41'; Jakub Brabec 50'; Facundo Bertoglio (yellow card) 88'	Stadium: Lamia Municipal Stadium; Attendance: 821; Referee: Stefanos Koubarakis

24 October 2021 7	Aris Thessaloniki	5 – 1	Panetolikos	Thessaloniki
16:00 EET	Aboubakar Kamara 18' (pen.); Facundo Bertoglio 34'; Daniel Sundgren 37'; Bruno Gama 44' (pen.); Badou Ndiaye 52', (yellow card) 58'; Lucas Sasha (yellow card) 62'; Javier Matilla (yellow card) 86'; Juan Iturbe (yellow card) 90+2'	Report	Braian Lluy (yellow card) 29'; Derek Cornelius (yellow card) 38'; Christos Belevonis (yellow card) 43'; Nikos Vergos 67' (pen.); Fabien Antunes (yellow card) 75'; Frederico Duarte (yellow card) 78'	Stadium: Kleanthis Vikelidis Stadium; Attendance: 7.042; Referee: Aristomenis Koutsiaftis

31 October 2021 8	AEK Athens	2 – 1	Aris Thessaloniki	Athens
19:30 EET	Lazaros Rota (yellow card) 7'; Gerasimos Mitoglou 15', (red card) 71'; Petros Mantalos 37' (pen.), (yellow card) 54'; André Simões (yellow card) 85'; Georgios Tzavellas (yellow card) 90+5'; Ognjen Vranješ (yellow card) 90+6'	Report	Fabiano Leismann (yellow card) 21'; James Jeggo (yellow card) 41'; Mateo García 73'; Aboubakar Kamara (yellow card) 90+5'; Juan Iturbe (yellow card) 90+6'	Stadium: Athens Olympic Stadium; Attendance: 17.561; Referee: Aristotelis Diamantopoulos

7 November 2021 9	Volos	1 – 2	Aris Thessaloniki	Volos
17:15 EET	Jean Barrientos (red card) 23'; Fausto Grillo (red card) 23'; Julián Bartolo 48'; Sotiris Ninis (yellow card) 49'; Franco Romero (yellow card) 79'	Report	Facundo Bertoglio (red card) 23'; Badou Ndiaye 35', (yellow card) 83'; Mateo García 46'; Aboubakar Kamara (yellow card) 79'	Stadium: Panthessaliko Stadium; Attendance: 433; Referee: Dimitrios Karantonis

20 November 2021 10	Aris Thessaloniki	0 – 5	PAS Giannina	Thessaloniki
19:30 EET	Aboubakar Kamara (yellow card) 63'; Daniel Mancini (yellow card) 83'	Report	Jan-Marc Schneider 5'; Rodrigo Erramuspe (yellow card) 23', (goal) 71' (pen.); Nicolae Milinceanu 35'; Juan Domínguez (yellow card) 51'; Juan José Perea 54'; Giannis Kargas (yellow card) 68'; Ahmad Mendes Moreira 85'	Stadium: Kleanthis Vikelidis Stadium; Attendance: 9.061; Referee: Roi Reinshreiber (Israel)

28 November 2021 11	PAOK	0 – 1	Aris Thessaloniki	Thessaloniki
19:30 EET	Lucas Taylor (yellow card) 45+1'; Jasmin Kurtić (yellow card) 83'; Andrija Živković (yellow card) 85'	Report	Daniel Mancini 41'; James Jeggo (yellow card) 48'; Mateo García (yellow card) 71'	Stadium: Toumba Stadium; Attendance: 12.605; Referee: Bobby Madden (Scotland)

5 December 2021 12	Aris Thessaloniki	1 – 0	Asteras Tripolis	Thessaloniki
19:30 EET	Bruno Gama 41'; James Jeggo (yellow card) 72'	Report	Pepe Castaño (yellow card) 29'; Adrián Riera (yellow card) 46'; Pichu Atienza (yellow card) 84'	Stadium: Kleanthis Vikelidis Stadium; Attendance: 7.460; Referee: Georgios Tzovaras

12 December 2021 13	Olympiacos	1 – 0	Aris Thessaloniki	Piraeus
19:30 EET	Pape Abou Cissé 54'; Kenny Lala (yellow card) 90+4'	Report	Emanuel Šakić (yellow card) 40'; Dimitrios Manos (yellow card) 67'; Fabiano Leismann (yellow card) 72'; Javier Matilla (yellow card) 90+4'	Stadium: Karaiskakis Stadium; Attendance: 15.045; Referee: Evangelos Manouhos

16 December 2021 14	OFI	1 – 1	Aris Thessaloniki	Heraklion
17:00 EET	Triantafyllos Pasalidis 15'; Felipe Gallegos (yellow card) 37'; Nikos Marinakis (yellow card) 59'; Miguel Mellado (yellow card) 87'	Report	James Jeggo (yellow card) 49'; Emanuel Šakić (yellow card) 55'; Bruno Gama 90' (pen.)	Stadium: Theodoros Vardinogiannis Stadium; Attendance: 2.231; Referee: Anastasios Papapetrou

20 December 2021 15	Aris Thessaloniki	1 – 0	Ionikos	Thessaloniki
19:30 EET	Aboubakar Kamara 49' (pen.); Daniel Mancini (yellow card) 52'; Lumor Agbenyenu (yellow card) 76'	Report	Jerson Cabral (yellow card) 25'	Stadium: Kleanthis Vikelidis Stadium; Attendance: 4.858; Referee: Aristotelis Diamantopoulos

5 January 2022 16	Panathinaikos	2 – 0	Aris Thessaloniki	Ampelokipoi
21:30 EET	Sebastián Palacios 14'; Lucas Villafáñez (yellow card) 64'; Aitor Cantalapiedra 83'	Report	Lucas Sasha (yellow card) 29'; Yohan Benalouane (yellow card) 68'; Dimitrios Manos (yellow card) 73'	Stadium: Leoforos Alexandras Stadium; Attendance: 934; Referee: Vasilios Fotias

23 February 2022 17	Aris Thessaloniki	3 – 0	Atromitos	Thessaloniki
18:00 EET	Daniel Mancini 45+2', 58'; Daniel Sundgren (yellow card) 48'; Juan Iturbe 83'	Report	Theofanis Mavrommatis (yellow card) 4'; Patrick Salomon (yellow card) 36'	Stadium: Kleanthis Vikelidis Stadium; Attendance: 3.213; Referee: Angelos Evangelou

15 January 2022 18	Apollon Smyrnis	0 – 0	Aris Thessaloniki	Athens
19:30 EET	Dimos Baxevanidis (yellow card) 78'	Report		Stadium: Georgios Kamaras Stadium; Attendance: 261; Referee: Dimitrios Karantonis

23 January 2022 19	Aris Thessaloniki	0 – 0	Lamia	Thessaloniki
15:00 EET	Fabiano Leismann (yellow card) 59'; Daniel Sundgren (yellow card) 90+3'	Report	Giorgos Saramantas (yellow card) 26'; Lazar Romanić (yellow card) 90+2'	Stadium: Kleanthis Vikelidis Stadium; Attendance: 974; Referee: Evangelos Manouhos

30 January 2022 20	Panetolikos	0 – 2	Aris Thessaloniki	Agrinio
15:00 EET	Diamantis Chouchoumis (yellow card) 14'	Report	Javier Matilla 5' (pen.); Daniel Mancini (yellow card) 16'; Aboubakar Kamara 20' (pen.); Cristian Ganea (yellow card) 90+3'	Stadium: Panetolikos Stadium; Attendance: 635; Referee: Athanassios Tzilos

2 February 2022 21	Aris Thessaloniki	2 – 1	AEK Athens	Thessaloniki
19:30 EET	Badou Ndiaye 44'; Aboubakar Kamara (yellow card) 48'; Emanuel Šakić 90+5'	Report	Georgios Tzavellas (yellow card) 64'; André Simões (yellow card) 66'; Ehsan Hajsafi (yellow card) 74'; Sergio Araujo 85'; Muamer Tanković (yellow card) 86'	Stadium: Kleanthis Vikelidis Stadium; Attendance: 967; Referee: Adrián Cordero Vega (Spain)

5 February 2022 22	Aris Thessaloniki	0 – 2	Volos	Thessaloniki
19:30 EET	Cristian Ganea (yellow card) 63'; Juan Iturbe (yellow card) 90+1'	Report	Franco Ferrari (yellow card) 15'; Nikolai Alho (yellow card) 34'; Jean Barrientos (yellow card) 59'; Alex Soares 80', (yellow card) 90+2'; Jorge Correa 86'	Stadium: Kleanthis Vikelidis Stadium; Attendance: 1.000; Referee: Konstantinos Perakis

14 February 2022 23	PAS Giannina	2 – 0	Aris Thessaloniki	Ioannina
19:30 EET	Marios Siampanis 51' (o.g.); Jan-Marc Schneider (yellow card) 57'; Caleb Stanko (yellow card) 72'; Juan Domínguez 84'; Louis Poznański (yellow card) 90+4'	Report	Mateo García (yellow card) 90+9'	Stadium: Zosimades Stadium; Attendance: 591; Referee: Anastasios Papapetrou

20 February 2022 24	Aris Thessaloniki	0 – 0	PAOK	Thessaloniki
19:30 EET		Report	Filipe Soares (yellow card) 57'; Léo Jabá (yellow card) 59'; Douglas Augusto (yellow card) 84'	Stadium: Kleanthis Vikelidis Stadium; Attendance: 9.191; Referee: Felix Brych (Germany)

26 February 2022 25	Asteras Tripolis	0 – 2	Aris Thessaloniki	Tripoli
17:15 EET	Juan Munafo (yellow card) 43'; Sito (yellow card) 52'; Jerónimo Barrales (yellow card) 53'; Pichu Atienza (yellow card) 61'; Francesc Regis (yellow card) 90+4'	Report	Aboubakar Kamara 41'; Julián Cuesta (yellow card) 72'; Daniel Sundgren (yellow card) 79'; Daniel Mancini (yellow card) 90'; Lucas Sasha 90+7'; Mateo García (yellow card) 90+9'	Stadium: Theodoros Kolokotronis Stadium; Referee: Gustavo Correia (Portugal)

6 March 2022 26	Aris Thessaloniki	2 – 1	Olympiacos	Thessaloniki
19:00 EET	Aboubakar Kamara 52'; Bruno Gama 79'; Julián Cuesta (yellow card) 90+5'	Report	Youssef El-Arabi 13'; Kenny Lala (yellow card) 24'; João Carvalho (yellow card) 35'	Stadium: Kleanthis Vikelidis Stadium; Attendance: 6.614; Referee: Georgios Tzovaras

==== Play-off Round ====
===== League table =====
Pos	Team	Pld	W	D	L	GF	GA	GD	Pts	Qualification
1	Olympiacos (X)	36	25	8	3	62	26	+36	83	Qualification for the Champions League first qualifying round
2	PAOK	36	19	7	10	58	33	+25	64	Qualification for the Europa Conference League second qualifying round
3	Aris Thessaloniki	36	18	8	10	39	28	+11	62	Qualification for the Europa Conference League second qualifying round
4	Panathinaikos	36	18	7	11	52	26	+26	61	
5	AEK Athens	36	16	8	12	56	42	+14	56	
6	PAS Giannina	36	12	10	14	34	42	−8	46	

Updated to match(es) played on 10 April 2022. Source: Super League Greece, Soccerway
(X) Assured of at least Europa Conference League, but may still qualify for Champions League

===== Results summary =====
Overall								Home						Away					
Pld	W	D	L	GF	GA	GD	Pts	W	D	L	GF	GA	GD	W	D	L	GF	GA	GD
36	18	8	10	39	28	+11	62	9	6	3	19	13	+6	9	2	7	20	15	+5

Last updated: 17 May 2022.
Source: Super League

===== Results by matchday =====
Matchday	1	2	3	4	5	6	7	8	9	10
Ground	A	H	H	A	H	A	H	A	H	A
Result	L	D	D	W	W	L	L	W	W	W
Position	4	4	5	3	3	4	4	4	4	3

Updated to match(es) played on 17 May 2022. Source: Super League
A = Away; H = Home; W = Win; D = Draw; L = Loss; P = Postponed

===== Matches =====
13 March 2022 1	Olympiacos	2 – 1	Aris Thessaloniki	Piraeus
19:00 EET	Kostas Manolas (yellow card) 33'; Andreas Bouchalakis (yellow card) 43'; Pape Abou Cissé 45+1'; Youssef El-Arabi 85' (pen.)	Report	Julián Cuesta (yellow card) 39'; Aboubakar Kamara (yellow card) 51'; Badou Ndiaye 61', (yellow card) 90+2'; Cristian Ganea (yellow card) 67'; Fabiano Leismann (yellow card) 83'; Javier Matilla (yellow card) 84'; Lucas Sasha (yellow card) 86'	Stadium: Karaiskakis Stadium; Attendance: 10.834; Referee: Evangelos Manouhos

20 March 2022 2	Aris Thessaloniki	0 – 0	Panathinaikos	Thessaloniki
19:30 EEST	Lucas Sasha (yellow card) 30'; Aboubakar Kamara (yellow card) 89'	Report	Bart Schenkeveld (yellow card) 40'; Aitor Cantalapiedra (yellow card) 52'; Sebastián Palacios (yellow card) 58'; Alberto Brignoli (yellow card) 70'; Achilleas Poungouras (yellow card) 81'; Zvonimir Šarlija (yellow card) 89'	Stadium: Kleanthis Vikelidis Stadium; Attendance: 6.702; Referee: Tamás Bognár (Hungary)

3 April 2022 3	Aris Thessaloniki	0 – 0	PAS Giannina	Thessaloniki
17:00 EEST	Yohan Benalouane (yellow card) 53'; Daniel Mancini (yellow card) 57'	Report	Zisis Karachalios (yellow card) 12'; Juan Domínguez (yellow card) 66'; Yuri Lodygin (yellow card) 75'	Stadium: Kleanthis Vikelidis Stadium; Attendance: 5.361; Referee: Anastasios Papapetrou

10 April 2022 4	AEK Athens	1 – 2	Aris Thessaloniki	Athens
19:30 EEST	Grzegorz Krychowiak (yellow card) 2'; Lazaros Rota 28', (yellow card) 90+2'; Nordin Amrabat (yellow card) 41'; Steven Zuber (yellow card) 56'	Report	Luis Palma 20'; Lucas Sasha 59'; Yohan Benalouane (yellow card) 70'; Facundo Bertoglio (yellow card) 90+2'; Georgios Delizisis (yellow card) 90+5'	Stadium: Athens Olympic Stadium; Attendance: 10.252; Referee: Bobby Madden (Scotland)

17 April 2022 5	Aris Thessaloniki	1 – 0	PAOK	Thessaloniki
19:30 EEST	Cheick Doukouré 17', (yellow card) 66'; Aboubakar Kamara (yellow card) 32'; Daniel Mancini (yellow card) 73'; Badou Ndiaye (yellow card) 74'	Report	Jasmin Kurtić (yellow card) 9'; Enea Mihaj (yellow card) 37' (yellow-red card) 70'; Filipe Soares (yellow card) 41'; Sidcley (yellow card) 90+4'	Stadium: Kleanthis Vikelidis Stadium; Attendance: 7.902; Referee: Luís Godinho (Portugal)

1 May 2022 6	Panathinaikos	1 – 0	Aris Thessaloniki	Athens
19:00 EEST	Bart Schenkeveld 28'; Fran Vélez (yellow card) 45'; Rubén Pérez (yellow card) 67'; Juankar (yellow card) 69'; Mateus Vital (yellow card) 90+3'	Report	Aboubakar Kamara (yellow card) 42' (yellow-red card) 45'; Fabiano Leismann (yellow card) 90+2'	Stadium: Leoforos Alexandras Stadium; Attendance: 9.855; Referee: Aliyar Aghayev (Azerbaijan)

8 May 2022 7	Aris Thessaloniki	0 – 1	Olympiacos	Thessaloniki
21:00 EEST	Salem M'Bakata (yellow card) 33'	Report	Tiquinho Soares 55'; Mamadou Kané (yellow card) 60'	Stadium: Kleanthis Vikelidis Stadium; Attendance: 6.208; Referee: Vassilios Fotias

11 May 2022 8	PAOK	0 – 1	Aris Thessaloniki	Thessaloniki
19:00 EEST	Sverrir Ingi Ingason (yellow card) 44'; Jasmin Kurtić (yellow card) 65'; Joan Sastre (yellow card) 82'	Report	Facundo Bertoglio (yellow card) 38'; Salem M'Bakata (yellow card) 45+2'; Cheick Doukouré (yellow card) 58'; Aboubakar Kamara 63'; Georgios Delizisis (yellow card) 90+6'	Stadium: Toumba Stadium; Attendance: 6.932; Referee: Felix Brych (Germany)

14 May 2022 9	Aris Thessaloniki	3 – 2	AEK Athens	Thessaloniki
20:00 EEST	Javier Matilla (yellow card) 51'; Luis Palma 78'; Daniel Mancini 85'; Mateo García 90+3'	Report	Grzegorz Krychowiak (yellow card) 51'; Levi García 53', 59'; Nordin Amrabat (yellow card) 56'; Petros Mantalos (yellow card) 66'; Damian Szymański (yellow card) 90'	Stadium: Kleanthis Vikelidis Stadium; Attendance: 10.338; Referee: Bobby Madden (Scotland)

17 May 2022 10	PAS Giannina	0 – 3	Aris Thessaloniki	Ioannina
20:00 EET		Report	Fabiano Leismann 8'; Aboubakar Kamara 22'; Salem M'Bakata 81'	Stadium: Zosimades Stadium; Attendance: 1.472; Referee: Anastasios Papapetrou

=== Greek Football Cup ===
==== Round of 16 ====
1 December 2021 First leg	Aris Thessaloniki	3 – 1	OFI	Thessaloniki
17:00 EET	Bruno Gama 16' (pen.); Aboubakar Kamara 45' (pen.); Lucas Sasha (yellow card) 54'; Fabiano Leismann (yellow card) 73'; Juan Iturbe 90'; Daniel Sundgren (yellow card) 90'	Report	Praxitelis Vouros (yellow card) 14'; Luc Castaignos 56'; Kostas Giannoulis (yellow card) 90'; Konstantinos Balogiannis (yellow card) 90'; Miguel Mellado (yellow card) 90'	Stadium: Kleanthis Vikelidis Stadium; Referee: Vasilios Fotias

22 December 2021 Second leg	OFI	0 – 2 (1–5 agg.)	Aris Thessaloniki	Heraklion
15:00 EET	Miguel Mellado (red card) 45'; Kostas Giannoulis (yellow card) 45'; Jon Toral (yellow card) 60'; Konstantinos Balogiannis (yellow card) 90'	Report	Fabiano Leismann (yellow card) 13'; Bruno Gama 49' (pen.); Aboubakar Kamara (yellow card) 51', (goal) 81'	Stadium: Theodoros Vardinogiannis Stadium; Referee: Alexandros Tsakalidis

==== Quarter-finals ====
20 January 2022 First leg	Aris Thessaloniki	0 – 0	Lamia	Thessaloniki
17:00 EET	Daniel Sundgren (yellow card) 81'; Fabiano Leismann (yellow card) 90'	Report	Vladimir Golemić (yellow card) 65'; Danny Bejarano (yellow card) 78'; Cristopher Núñez (yellow card) 85'; Bojan Šaranov (yellow card) 90'	Stadium: Kleanthis Vikelidis Stadium; Referee: Konstantinos Perrakis

26 January 2022 Second leg	Lamia	1 – 0 (a.e.t.) (1–0 agg.)	Aris Thessaloniki	Heraklion
15:00 EET	Danny Bejarano (yellow card) 16'; Theofanis Tzandaris (yellow card) 52'; Cristopher Núñez (yellow card) 57'; Lass Bangoura (yellow card) 104'; Adam Tzanetopoulos (yellow card) 109', (goal) 118'	Report	Badou Ndiaye (yellow card) 67'; Jakub Brabec (yellow card) 120'	Stadium: Theodoros Vardinogiannis Stadium; Referee: Dimitris Karantonis

=== UEFA Europa Conference League ===
==== Second qualifying round ====
22 July 2021 First leg	Astana (Kazakhstan)	2 – 0	(Greece) Aris Thessaloniki	Nur-Sultan, Kazakhstan
16:00 EET	Marin Tomasov 25', 71'; Luka Šimunović (yellow card) 27' (yellow-red card) 76'	Report	Yohan Benalouane (yellow card) 4'; Bruno Felipe (yellow card) 83'; Javier Matilla (yellow card) 86'	Stadium: Astana Arena; Attendance: 0 Referee: Bastian Dankert (Germany)

29 July 2021 Second leg	Aris Thessaloniki (Greece)	2 – 1 (a.e.t.) (2–3 agg.)	(Kazakhstan) Astana	Thessaloniki, Greece
21:30 EET	Daniel Sundgren (yellow card) 22'; Daniel Mancini (yellow card) 32'; Dimitrios Manos 36'; Mateo García (yellow card) 68' (yellow-red card) 86'; Lucas Sasha 78'; Javier Matilla (yellow card) 90+7'	Report	Tigran Barseghyan (yellow card) 37'; Abat Aymbetov (yellow card) 80'; Cadete (yellow card) 90+8'; Mark Gurman (yellow card) 116'; Eneo Bitri 120+1'	Stadium: Kleanthis Vikelidis Stadium; Referee: Michael Fabbri (Italy)

== Squad statistics ==
=== Appearances ===
As of match played 17 May 2022

#	Position	Nat.	Player	Super League 1		Greek Cup		UECL		Total	
#	Position	Nat.	Player	Apps	Starts	Apps	Starts	Apps	Starts	Apps	Starts
1	GK	(Brazil)	Denis César	4	4	2	1	2	2	8	7
2	DF	(France) / (Democratic Republic of the Congo)	Salem Mbakata	8	8	0	0	0	0	8	8
3	DF	(Ghana)	Lumor Agbenyenu	10	5	3	1	0	0	13	6
4	DF	(Brazil)	Fabiano Leismann	32	32	4	4	1	1	37	37
5	DF	(Greece)	Georgios Delizisis	7	2	0	0	1	1	8	3
7	FW	(Argentina) / (Italy)	Daniel Mancini	31	26	3	2	2	2	36	30
8	MF	(Netherlands) / (Cape Verde)	Lerin Duarte	0	0	0	0	0	0	0	0
9	FW	(Greece)	Dimitrios Manos	19	2	3	1	2	1	24	4
10	FW	(Argentina) / (Italy)	Mateo García	30	12	3	2	2	1	35	15
11	FW	(Greece)	Kostas Mitroglou	0	0	0	0	1	0	1	0
12	FW	(Iraq)	Mohanad Ali	3	0	0	0	0	0	3	0
13	MF	(Ivory Coast) / (France)	Cheick Doukouré	10	6	0	0	0	0	10	6'
14	DF	(Czech Republic)	Jakub Brabec	35	35	4	4	0	0	39	39
15	FW	(Paraguay) / (Argentina)	Juan Iturbe	33	18	4	1	0	0	37	19
16	FW	(Portugal)	Bruno Gama	27	15	4	3	2	2	33	20
17	MF	(Senegal)	Badou Ndiaye	31	24	4	3	0	0	35	27
18	FW	(Argentina) / (Italy)	Facundo Bertoglio	23	14	2	2	2	2	27	18
19	FW	(Spain)	Cristian López	7	1	2	0	0	0	9	1
20	FW	(Bosnia and Herzegovina) / (Switzerland)	Izet Hajrović	9	1	0	0	2	0	11	1
21	DF	(Sweden)	Daniel Sundgren	27	23	4	4	1	1	32	28
22	DF	(Romania) / (Spain)	Cristian Ganea	31	28	3	3	1	1	35	32
23	GK	(Spain)	Julián Cuesta	27	27	2	2	0	0	29	29
25	DF	(Greece)	Christos Marmaridis	0	0	1	0	0	0	1	0
26	MF	(Spain)	Javier Matilla	29	20	3	0	2	2	34	22
27	DF	(Greece)	Panagiotis Sengergis	0	0	0	0	0	0	0	0
29	DF	(Tunisia) / (France)	Yohan Benalouane	6	3	1	0	2	2	9	5
35	MF	(Greece)	Zisis Saliaris	0	0	0	0	0	0	0	0
44	DF	(Greece)	Kyriakos Aslanidis	1	1	0	0	0	0	1	1
47	FW	(Mauritania) / (France)	Aboubakar Kamara	32	31	3	3	0	0	35	34
50	FW	(Honduras)	Luis Palma	11	4	0	0	0	0	11	4
66	DF	(Austria)	Emanuel Šakić	18	9	0	0	2	2	20	11
88	MF	(Brazil) / (Italy)	Lucas Sasha	30	26	4	4	2	2	36	32
99	GK	(Greece)	Marios Siampanis	5	5	1	1	0	0	6	6
Players who left the club during this season
	FW	(Brazil)	Bruno Felipe	0	0	0	0	2	0	2	0
	MF	(Australia) / (England)	James Jeggo	15	14	3	3	2	0	20	17
Total				36		4		2		42	

=== Goals ===
As of match played 17 May 2022

Ranking	Position	Nat.	Player	Super League 1	Greek Cup	UECL	Total
1	FW	(Mauritania) / (France)	Aboubakar Kamara	8	2	0	10
2	FW	(Portugal)	Bruno Gama	5	2	0	7
3	FW	(Argentina) / (Italy)	Daniel Mancini	5	0	0	5
4	MF	(Senegal)	Badou Ndiaye	4	0	0	4
4	FW	(Argentina) / (Italy)	Mateo García	4	0	0	4
6	MF	(Brazil) / (Italy)	Lucas Sasha	2	0	1	3
7	FW	(Honduras)	Luis Palma	2	0	0	2
7	FW	(Paraguay) / (Argentina)	Juan Iturbe	1	1	0	2
9	DF	(Czech Republic)	Jakub Brabec	1	0	0	1
9	FW	(Argentina) / (Italy)	Facundo Bertoglio	1	0	0	1
9	DF	(Sweden)	Daniel Sundgren	1	0	0	1
9	MF	(Spain)	Javier Matilla	1	0	0	1
9	DF	(Austria)	Emanuel Šakić	1	0	0	1
9	MF	(Ivory Coast) / (France)	Cheick Doukouré	1	0	0	1
9	DF	(Brazil)	Fabiano Leismann	1	0	0	1
9	DF	(France) / (Democratic Republic of the Congo)	Salem M'Bakata	1	0	0	1
9	FW	(Greece)	Dimitrios Manos	0	0	1	1
Total				39	5	2	46

=== Clean Sheets ===
As of match played 17 May 2022

#	Nat.	Player	Super League 1	Greek Cup	UECL	Total
23	(Spain)	Julián Cuesta	14	2	0	16
1	(Brazil)	Denis César	2	1	0	3
99	(Greece)	Marios Siampanis	2	0	0	2
Total			18	2 (Note: In the home game against Lamia for the Quarter-finals, Aris used Cuesta and Denis)	0	20

== Players' awards ==
=== Interwetten Best Goal (Super League 1) ===
Matchday	Nat.	Player	Ref
Regular Season
17th	(Paraguay) / (Argentina)	Juan Iturbe	
25th	(Brazil) / (Italy)	Lucas Sasha	
Play-Off / Play-Out
1st/2nd	(Senegal)	Badou Ndiaye	
7th/8th	(Mauritania) / (France)	Aboubakar Kamara	

=== Interwetten Player of the Month (Super League 1) ===
Month	Nat.	Player	Ref
October	(Sweden)	Daniel Sundgren	
April	(Brazil)	Fabiano Leismann	

=== NIVEA MEN Player of the Club ===
Nat.	Player	Ref
(Argentina) (Italy)	Daniel Mancini	
