= 2020–21 Aris Thessaloniki F.C. season =

Aris Thessaloniki
- President: Theodoros A. Karipidis
- Manager: Michael Oenning (until 18 September 2020); Apostolos Terzis (from 19 September 2020 until 20 September 2020); Akis Mantzios (from 21 September 2020)
- Stadium: Kleanthis Vikelidis Stadium
- Super League 1: 3rd
- Greek Cup: Quarter-finals
- UEFA Europa League: Second qualifying round
- Top goalscorer: League: Dimitrios Manos (7); All: Dimitrios Manos (8)
Home colours	Away colours	Third colours

The 2020–21 season was the club's 107th season in existence and the third consecutive season in the top flight of Greek football. In addition to the domestic league, Aris Thessaloniki participate in the Greek Football Cup and in the UEFA Europa League, from which they were eliminated in the second qualifying round by Ukrainian club Kolos Kovalivka.

Aris changed managers in September, following the elimination in the Europa League, hiring Akis Mantzios

== First-team squad ==
#	Name	Nationality	Position(s)	Date of birth (age)	Signed from
Goalkeepers
23	Julián Cuesta	(Spain)	GK	March 28, 1991 (aged 30)	(Poland) Wisła Kraków
30	Zacharie Boucher	(France)	GK	March 7, 1992 (aged 29)	(France) Auxerre
99	Marios Siampanis	(Greece)	GK	September 28, 1999 (aged 21)	(Greece) Olympiacos
Defenders
3	Apostolos Martinis	(Greece)	LB / LM	January 8, 2001 (aged 20)	(Greece) Olympiacos
5	Georgios Delizisis (captain)	(Greece)	CB	December 1, 1987 (aged 33)	(Greece) Apollon Smyrnis
21	Daniel Sundgren	(Sweden)	RB / RM / DM	November 22, 1990 (aged 30)	(Sweden) AIK Fotboll
22	Cristian Ganea	(Romania) / (Spain)	LB / LM / LW	May 24, 1992 (aged 29)	(Spain) Athletic Bilbao
25	Christos Marmaridis	(Greece)	RB	May 25, 2002 (aged 19)	Club's Academy
29	Yohan Benalouane	(Tunisia) / (France)	CB / RB / LB	March 28, 1987 (aged 34)	Free Agent
40	Petros Bagalianis	(Greece)	CB	February 6, 2001 (aged 20)	Club's Academy
44	Nicholas Ioannou	(Cyprus) / (England)	LB / CB	November 11, 1995 (aged 25)	(England) Nottingham Forest
66	Emanuel Šakić	(Austria)	RB / RM / DM	January 25, 1991 (aged 30)	(Austria) Sturm Graz
92	Lindsay Rose	(Mauritius) / (France)	CB / RB	February 8, 1992 (aged 29)	(France) Lorient
Midfielders
6	James Jeggo	(Australia) / (England)	DM / CM	February 12, 1992 (aged 29)	Austria Wien
8	Lerin Duarte	(Netherlands) / (Cape Verde)	CM / AM	August 11, 1990 (aged 30)	(Netherlands) Heracles Almelo
20	Ergys Kaçe	(Albania)	DM / CM	July 8, 1993 (aged 27)	(Greece) PAOK
26	Javier Matilla (vice-captain)	(Spain)	CM / DM	August 16, 1988 (aged 32)	(Spain) Gimnàstic de Tarragona
38	Petros Bakoutsis	(Greece)	CM / DM / AM	June 29, 2001 (aged 19)	Club's Academy
88	Lucas Sasha	(Brazil) / (Italy)	DM / LB / RB	March 1, 1990 (aged 31)	(Bulgaria) Ludogorets Razgrad
Forwards
7	Daniel Mancini	(Argentina) / (Italy)	RW / LW / SS	November 11, 1996 (aged 24)	(France) Girondins de Bordeaux
9	Dimitrios Manos	(Greece)	ST / SS / RW	September 16, 1994 (aged 26)	(Greece) Olympiacos
10	Mateo García	(Argentina) / (Italy)	RW / LW	September 10, 1996 (aged 24)	(Serbia) Red Star Belgrade
14	Kostas Mitroglou	(Greece)	ST	March 12, 1988 (aged 33)	(France) Olympique de Marseille
16	Bruno Gama	(Portugal)	RW / LW / SS	November 15, 1987 (aged 33)	(Spain) Alcorcón
17	Xande Silva	(Portugal) / (Angola)	RW / LW / ST	March 16, 1997 (aged 24)	(England) West Ham United
18	Facundo Bertoglio	(Argentina) / (Italy)	LW / RW / SS	June 30, 1990 (aged 30)	(Argentina) Aldosivi
77	Bruno Felipe	(Brazil)	RW / LW / SS	May 26, 1994 (aged 27)	(Greece) Olympiacos

== Transfers and loans ==
=== Transfers in ===
Entry date	Position	No.	Player	From club	Fee	Ref.
August 2020	DF	66	(Austria) Emanuel Šakić	(Austria) Sturm Graz	Free	
August 2020	FW	18	(Argentina) / (Italy) Facundo Bertoglio	(Argentina) Aldosivi	Free	
August 2020	FW	9	(Greece) Dimitrios Manos	(Greece) Olympiacos	Free	
August 2020	DF	22	(Romania) / (Spain) Cristian Ganea	(Spain) Athletic Bilbao	Free	
August 2020	MF	6	(Australia) / (England) James Jeggo	Austria Wien	Free	
August 2020	DF	4	(Croatia) Toni Datković	(Croatia) Lokomotiva	€160.000	
August 2020	FW	11	(Spain) Cristian López	(Spain) Las Palmas	Free	
August 2020	MF	34	(North Macedonia) Ali Adem	(North Macedonia) Vardar Skopje	Free	
September 2020	GK	30	(France) Zacharie Boucher	(France) Auxerre	Free	
October 2020	FW	10	(Argentina) / (Italy) Mateo García	(Serbia) Red Star Belgrade	€1.300.000	
October 2020	DF	3	(Greece) Apostolos Martinis	(Greece) Olympiacos	Free	
October 2020	MF	20	(Albania) Ergys Kaçe	(Greece) PAOK	Free	
October 2020	GK	99	(Greece) Marios Siampanis	(Greece) Olympiacos	Free	
October 2020	DF	29	(Tunisia) / (France) Yohan Benalouane	Free Agent	Free	
January 2021	FW	14	(Greece) Kostas Mitroglou	(France) Olympique de Marseille	Free	
January 2021	FW	77	(Brazil) Bruno Felipe	(Greece) Olympiacos	Free	

=== Transfers out ===
Exit date	Position	No.	Player	To club	Fee	Ref.
June 2020	DF	3	(Portugal) Hugo Sousa	Free Agent	Released	
June 2020	FW	9	(Greece) Dimitris Diamantopoulos	Free Agent	Released	
September 2020	MF	12	(Argentina) / (Portugal) Nicolás Martínez	(Greece) Volos	Released	
October 2020	FW	10	(Greece) Giannis Fetfatzidis	(Qatar) Al-Khor SC	€1.100.000	
December 2020	GK	1	(Austria) Fabian Ehmann	Free Agent	Released	

=== Loans in ===
Start date	End date	Position	No.	Player	From club	Fee	Ref.
October 2020	End of season	FW	17	(Portugal) / (Angola) Xande Silva	(England) West Ham United	None	
January 2021	End of season	DF	44	(Cyprus) / (England) Nicholas Ioannou	(England) Nottingham Forest	None	

=== Loans Out ===
Start date	End date	Position	No.	Player	To club	Fee	Ref.
January 2021	End of season	DF	4	(Croatia) Toni Datković	(Spain) Cartagena	None	
January 2021	End of season	FW	11	(Spain) Cristian López	(Spain) Cartagena	None	
January 2021	December 2021	MF	34	(North Macedonia) Ali Adem	(North Macedonia) Shkupi	None	
January 2021	End of season	FW	33	(Greece) Konstantinos Chatzipirpiridis	(Greece) O.F. Ierapetra	None	
February 2021	End of season	DF	31	(Greece) Panagiotis Tsagalidis	(Greece) Olympiacos Volos	None	
March 2021	End of season	DF	27	(Greece) Panagiotis Sengergis	(Greece) Triglia	None	

=== Transfer summary ===
Spending

Summer: ▼€1.460.000

Winter: €0

Total: ▼€1.460.000

Income

Summer: ▲€1.100.000

Winter: €0

Total: ▲€1.100.000

Net Expenditure

Summer: ▼€360.000

Winter: €0

Total: ▼€360.000

== Competitions ==
=== Overall ===
Competition	Started round	Current position / round	Final position / round	First match	Last match
Super League 1	Matchday 1	—	3rd	11 September 2020	16 May 2021
Regular Season	Matchday 1	—	2nd	11 September 2020	14 March 2021
Play-off Round	Matchday 1	—	3rd	21 March 2021	16 May 2021
Greek Cup	First Round	—	Quarter-finals	20 January 2021	3 March 2021
Europa League	Second qualifying round	—	Second qualifying round	17 September 2020	17 September 2020

Updated to match played 16 May 2021
Source: Competitions

=== Overview ===
Competition	Record							
Competition	G	W	D	L	GF	GA	GD	Win %
Super League 1	36	17	10	9	41	26	+15	47.22
Greek Cup	4	2	1	1	6	3	+3	50.00
Europa League	1	0	0	1	1	2	−1	0.00
Total	41	19	11	11	48	31	+17	46.34

Updated to match played 16 May 2021
Source: Competitions

Super League 1	Record							
Super League 1	G	W	D	L	GF	GA	GD	Win %
Regular Season	26	15	6	5	34	16	+18	57.69
Play-off Round	10	2	4	4	7	10	−3	20.00
Total	36	17	10	9	41	26	+15	47.22

Updated to match played 16 May 2021
Source: Competitions

==== Managers' overview ====
===== Michael Oenning =====
Competition	Record							
Competition	G	W	D	L	GF	GA	GD	Win %
Super League 1	1	1	0	0	3	1	+2	100.00
Greek Cup	0	0	0	0	0	0	+0	—
Europa League	1	0	0	1	1	2	−1	0.00
Total	2	1	0	1	4	3	+1	50.00

Updated to match played 18 September 2020
Source: Competitions

===== Apostolos Terzis =====
Competition	Record							
Competition	G	W	D	L	GF	GA	GD	Win %
Super League 1	1	1	0	0	1	0	+1	100.00
Greek Cup	0	0	0	0	0	0	+0	—
Europa League	0	0	0	0	0	0	+0	—
Total	1	1	0	0	1	0	+1	100.00

Updated to match played 20 September 2020
Source: Competitions

===== Akis Mantzios =====
Competition	Record							
Competition	G	W	D	L	GF	GA	GD	Win %
Super League 1	34	15	10	9	37	25	+12	44.12
Greek Cup	4	2	1	1	6	3	+3	50.00
Europa League	0	0	0	0	0	0	+0	—
Total	38	17	11	10	43	28	+15	44.74

Updated to match played 16 May 2021
Source: Competitions

=== Super League 1 ===
==== Regular season ====
===== League table =====
Pos	Team	Pld	W	D	L	GF	GA	GD	Pts	Qualification
1	Olympiacos	26	21	4	1	64	13	+51	67	Qualification for the Play-off round
2	Aris	26	15	6	5	34	16	+18	51	Qualification for the Play-off round
3	AEK Athens	26	14	6	6	41	29	+12	48	Qualification for the Play-off round
4	PAOK	26	13	8	5	49	26	+23	47	Qualification for the Play-off round
5	Panathinaikos	26	13	6	7	30	19	+11	45	Qualification for the Play-off round

Source: Super League Greece
Rules for classification: 1) Points; 2) Head-to-head points; 3) Head-to-head goal difference; 4) Goals scored; 5) Goals against.

===== Results summary =====
Overall								Home						Away					
Pld	W	D	L	GF	GA	GD	Pts	W	D	L	GF	GA	GD	W	D	L	GF	GA	GD
26	15	6	5	34	16	+18	51	8	2	3	16	7	+9	7	4	2	18	9	+9

Last updated: 14 March 2021.
Source: Super League

===== Results by matchday =====
In this table the position of team is updated after every matchday. Results of postponed matches are not included in the round which they were originally scheduled, but the position is being updated at the round where the match was played chronologically. For example, the match against AEL for 6th round postponed and reprogrammed between round 10 and round 11 so the position (after the win) was updated in 10th round

Matchday	1	2	3	4	5	6	7	8	9	10	11	12	13	14	15	16	17	18	19	20	21	22	23	24	25	26
Ground	H	A	H	A	H	A	H	H	A	H	A	H	A	A	H	A	H	A	H	A	A	H	A	H	A	H
Result	W	W	D	W	W	W	W	L	W	L	D	W	W	L	W	D	L	W	W	L	W	D	D	W	D	W
Position	1	1	1	1	1	1	1	2	2	2	3	2	2	2	2	3	4	3	2	3	2	2	3	2	2	2

Updated to match(es) played on 14 March 2021. Source: Super League
A = Away; H = Home; W = Win; D = Draw; L = Loss; P = Postponed

===== Matches =====
11 September 2020 1	Aris Thessaloniki	3 – 1	Lamia	Thessaloniki
18:15 EEST	Emanuel Šakić (yellow card) 18'; Lucas Sasha (yellow card) 62'; Lindsay Rose (yellow card) 65'; Petros Bagalianis (yellow card) 69'; Cristian López 72'; Bruno Gama 78' (pen.); Facundo Bertoglio 89'	Report	Giorgos Saramantas (yellow card) 23'; Lazar Romanić 38' (pen.); Leonardo Villalba (yellow card) 48'	Stadium: Kleanthis Vikelidis Stadium; Referee: Aristotelis Diamantopoulos

20 September 2020 2	Volos	0 – 1	Aris Thessaloniki	Volos
20:30 EEST	Tasos Tsokanis (yellow card) 14'; Jean Barrientos (yellow card) 21'; Daan Rienstra (yellow card) 40'; Erik Jendrišek (yellow card) 85'; Salvador Sánchez (yellow card) 90+3'	Report	James Jeggo (yellow card) 2'; Bruno Gama 16' (pen.); Lucas Sasha (yellow card) 71'; Lindsay Rose (yellow card) 90+6'	Stadium: Panthessaliko Stadium; Referee: Aristidis Vatsios

27 September 2020 3	Aris Thessaloniki	2 – 2	PAS Giannina	Thessaloniki
16:00 EEST	Giannis Fetfatzidis (yellow card) 43', (goal) 48'; Javier Matilla 67'; James Jeggo (yellow card) 78'; Lindsay Rose (yellow card) 83'; Daniel Mancini (yellow card) 86'	Report	Vladyslav Naumets 15'; Epaminondas Pantelakis 22', (yellow card) 66'; Fabry (yellow card) 46'; Alexandros Kartalis (yellow card) 55'; Rodrigo Erramuspe (yellow card) 72'; Marvin Peersman (yellow card) 90'	Stadium: Kleanthis Vikelidis Stadium; Referee: Angelos Evangelou

4 October 2020 4	Panathinaikos	0 – 1	Aris Thessaloniki	Athens
16:00 EEST	Dimitrios Kourbelis (yellow card) 22'; Dimitris Serpezis (yellow card) 72'	Report	Daniel Mancini 25'; Lindsay Rose (yellow card) 31'; Emanuel Šakić (yellow card) 44'; Zacharie Boucher (yellow card) 90+6'	Stadium: Athens Olympic Stadium; Referee: Petros Tsagarakis

17 October 2020 5	Aris Thessaloniki	1 – 0	Apollon Smyrnis	Ioannina
18:15 EEST	Emanuel Šakić (yellow card) 17'; Bruno Gama 35'; James Jeggo (yellow card) 37'	Report	Vykintas Slivka (yellow card) 19'; Vasilis Vitlis (yellow card) 22'; Dimos Baxevanidis (yellow card) 59'	Stadium: Zosimades Stadium; Referee: Dimitrios Karantonis

2 December 2020 6	AEL	0 – 3	Aris Thessaloniki	Larissa
17:15 EET	Ioannis Kosti (yellow card) 30'; Tim Sparv (yellow card) 45'; Mateo Mužek (yellow card) 57'; Steliano Filip (yellow card) 90+2'	Report	Dimitrios Manos 18', 73'; Bruno Gama (yellow card) 71'; Xande Silva 90+6'	Stadium: Alcazar Stadium; Referee: Dimitrios Karantonis

1 November 2020 7	Aris Thessaloniki	1 – 0	Asteras Tripolis	Thessaloniki
15:00 EET	Mateo García (yellow card) 13'; Daniel Mancini (yellow card) 45'; Triantafyllos Pasalidis 55' (o.g.); Dimitrios Manos (yellow card) 66'; Marios Siampanis (yellow card) 90+2'	Report	Léo Tilica (yellow card) 36'; Christos Tasoulis (yellow card) 44'; Juan Munafo (yellow card) 53'	Stadium: Kleanthis Vikelidis Stadium; Referee: Vassilios Fotias

14 January 2021 8	Aris Thessaloniki	0 – 1	AEK Athens	Thessaloniki
19:30 EET	Yohan Benalouane (yellow card) 90+1'; Daniel Sundgren (yellow card) 90+4'	Report	Nenad Krstičić (yellow card) 30'; Levi García 65'; Marko Livaja (yellow card) 69'; Karim Ansarifard (yellow card) 74'; Konstantinos Galanopoulos (yellow card) 86'	Stadium: Kleanthis Vikelidis Stadium; Referee: Ivan Bebek (Croatia)

22 November 2020 9	Panetolikos	0 – 1	Aris Thessaloniki	Agrinio
17:15 EET	Manolis Tzanakakis (yellow card) 80'; Jorge Díaz (yellow card) 90+2'	Report	Bruno Gama 18' (pen.), (yellow card) 49'; Yohan Benalouane (yellow card) 29'; Dimitrios Manos (yellow card) 45+1'; Facundo Bertoglio (yellow card) 90+3'	Stadium: Panetolikos Stadium; Referee: Aristomenis Koutsiaftis

28 November 2020 10	Aris Thessaloniki	1 – 2	Olympiacos	Thessaloniki
19:30 EET	Facundo Bertoglio 74'	Report	Andreas Bouchalakis 29', 47'; Rúben Semedo (yellow card) 40'; Pape Abou Cissé (yellow card) 60'; Kostas Fortounis (yellow card) 83'	Stadium: Kleanthis Vikelidis Stadium; Referee: Ivan Bebek (Croatia)

5 December 2020 11	Atromitos	2 – 2	Aris Thessaloniki	Athens
17:15 EET	Giorgos Manousos 37' (pen.); Lucas Galvão (yellow card) 40'; Josip Tomašević (yellow card) 50'; Juan Muñiz 51'; Charis Charisis (yellow card) 78'; Spyros Risvanis (yellow card) 89'	Report	Lindsay Rose (yellow card) 30' (yellow-red card) 35'; Ergys Kaçe 61'; Lucas Sasha 81'	Stadium: Peristeri Stadium; Referee: Angelos Evangelou

13 December 2020 12	Aris Thessaloniki	1 – 0	PAOK	Thessaloniki
19:30 EET	Bruno Gama 40' (pen.); Xande Silva (yellow card) 67'; Yohan Benalouane (yellow card) 75'	Report	Douglas Augusto (yellow card) 8'; Theocharis Tsingaras (yellow card) 21'; Dimitris Giannoulis (yellow card) 90+1'	Stadium: Kleanthis Vikelidis Stadium; Referee: Bas Nijhuis (Netherlands)

19 December 2020 13	OFI	0 – 3	Aris Thessaloniki	Heraklion
19:30 EET	Juan Neira (yellow card) 57'; Miguel Mellado (yellow card) 60'; Nikos Vafeas (yellow card) 74'	Report	Facundo Bertoglio 29', 42'; Xande Silva (yellow card) 58'; Javier Matilla 76' (pen.); Zacharie Boucher (yellow card) 81'; Emanuel Šakić (yellow card) 86'	Stadium: Theodoros Vardinogiannis Stadium; Referee: Aristotelis Diamantopoulos

4 January 2021 14	Lamia	2 – 0	Aris Thessaloniki	Lamia
19:30 EET	Bachana Arabuli 8' (pen.), 17'; Tyronne del Pino (yellow card) 33'; Theódór Elmar Bjarnason (yellow card) 80'	Report	Facundo Bertoglio (yellow card) 43'; Javier Matilla (yellow card) 45'; Daniel Sundgren (red card) 63'; Lindsay Rose (yellow card) 67'; Daniel Mancini (yellow card) 81'; Cristian López (yellow card) 84'	Stadium: Athanasios Diakos; Referee: Emmanouil Skoulas

7 January 2021 15	Aris Thessaloniki	2 – 0	Volos	Thessaloniki
17:15 EET	Lucas Sasha 18', (yellow card) 56'; Mateo García (yellow card) 60'; Facundo Bertoglio 81'	Report	Alberto Bueno (yellow card) 28'; Juan José Perea (yellow card) 36'; Jean Barrientos (yellow card) 64'	Stadium: Kleanthis Vikelidis Stadium; Referee: Anastasios Papapetrou

11 January 2021 16	PAS Giannina	0 – 0	Aris Thessaloniki	Ioannina
17:15 EET	Marvin Peersman (yellow card) 41'; Georgios Pamlidis (yellow card) 54'; Sandi Križman (yellow card) 76'	Report	Cristian Ganea (yellow card) 29'; Bruno Gama (yellow card) 39'	Stadium: Zosimades Stadium; Referee: Petros Tsagarakis

17 January 2021 17	Aris Thessaloniki	0 – 1	Panathinaikos	Thessaloniki
19:30 EET	Cristian López (yellow card) 11'; Nicholas Ioannou (yellow card) 34'; Yohan Benalouane (yellow card) 58'; Emanuel Šakić (yellow card) 85'	Report	Argyris Kampetsis 9'; Achilleas Poungouras (yellow card) 11'; Yohan Mollo (yellow card) 73'	Stadium: Kleanthis Vikelidis Stadium; Referee: Anastasios Sidiropoulos

23 January 2021 18	Apollon Smyrnis	0 – 1	Aris Thessaloniki	Athens
17:15 EET	Fatjon Andoni (yellow card) 45+2'	Report	Nicholas Ioannou 18', (yellow card) 45'	Stadium: Georgios Kamaras Stadium; Referee: Aristotelis Diamantopoulos

26 January 2021 19	Aris Thessaloniki	1 – 0	AEL	Thessaloniki
19:30 EET	Lindsay Rose 30'; Facundo Bertoglio (yellow card) 37'; Nicholas Ioannou (yellow card) 67'	Report	Dimitris Pinakas (yellow card) 44'; Adrián Colombino (yellow card) 54'; Fiorin Durmishaj (yellow card) 78'; Radomir Milosavljević (yellow card) 87'	Stadium: Kleanthis Vikelidis Stadium; Referee: Stefanos Koubarakis

30 January 2021 20	Asteras Tripolis	2 – 1	Aris Thessaloniki	Tripoli
17:15 EET	Francesc Regis 66'; Adrián Riera 70'; Franco Bellocq (yellow card) 90'	Report	Dimitrios Manos 28'; Nicholas Ioannou (yellow card) 40'; Yohan Benalouane (yellow card) 65'; James Jeggo (yellow card) 68'	Stadium: Theodoros Kolokotronis Stadium; Referee: Vassilios Fotias

7 February 2021 21	AEK Athens	0 – 2	Aris Thessaloniki	Athens
19:30 EET	André Simões (yellow card) 23'; Hélder Lopes (yellow card) 53'; Nenad Krstičić (yellow card) 54'	Report	Lindsay Rose 29'; Daniel Sundgren (yellow card) 81'; Dimitrios Manos (yellow card) 89'; Xande Silva 90+1'	Stadium: Athens Olympic Stadium; Referee: Andris Treimanis (Latvia)

14 February 2021 22	Aris Thessaloniki	0 – 0	Panetolikos	Thessaloniki
15:00 EET	Bruno Gama (yellow card) 33'	Report	Paolo Medina (yellow card) 5'; Gboly Ariyibi (yellow card) 27'	Stadium: Kleanthis Vikelidis Stadium; Referee: Aristidis Vatsios

21 February 2021 23	Olympiacos	1 – 1	Aris Thessaloniki	Piraeus
19:30 EET	Kostas Fortounis 40', (yellow card) 43'; Mady Camara (yellow card) 51'; Rúben Semedo (yellow card) 79'; José Sá (yellow card) 80'; Lazar Ranđelović (yellow card) 90+6'	Report	James Jeggo (yellow card) 45+3'; Xande Silva (yellow card) 56'; Kostas Mitroglou 83' (pen.), (yellow card) 85'	Stadium: Karaiskakis Stadium; Referee: Anastasios Sidiropoulos

28 February 2021 24	Aris Thessaloniki	3 – 0	Atromitos	Thessaloniki
15:00 EET	Cristian Ganea 22'; Lucas Sasha 65'; Georgios Delizisis (yellow card) 70'; Xande Silva 80'; Ergys Kaçe (yellow card) 85'	Report	Georgios Daviotis (yellow card) 45+1'; Josip Tomašević (yellow card) 87'	Stadium: Kleanthis Vikelidis Stadium; Referee: Georgios Tzovaras

7 March 2021 25	PAOK	2 – 2	Aris Thessaloniki	Thessaloniki
19:30 EET	Andrija Živković (yellow card) 12'; Stefan Schwab (yellow card) 50'; Sverrir Ingi Ingason 87'; Michael Krmenčík (yellow card) 88'; Vieirinha 90+4' (pen.)	Report	Facundo Bertoglio 26'; Dimitrios Manos 69'; Daniel Mancini (yellow card) 81'; Zacharie Boucher (yellow card) 90+2'	Stadium: Toumba Stadium; Referee: Szymon Marciniak (Poland)

14 March 2021 26	Aris Thessaloniki	1 – 0	OFI	Thessaloniki
19:00 EET	Kostas Mitroglou 6'; Xande Silva (yellow card) 41'	Report		Stadium: Kleanthis Vikelidis Stadium; Referee: Aristotelis Diamantopoulos

==== Play-off Round ====
===== League table =====
Pos	Team	Pld	W	D	L	GF	GA	GD	Pts	Qualification
1	Olympiacos	36	28	6	2	82	19	+63	90	Qualification for the Champions League first qualifying round
2	PAOK	36	18	10	8	60	34	+26	64	Qualification for the Europa Conference League second qualifying round
3	Aris Thessaloniki	36	17	10	9	41	26	+15	61	Qualification for the Europa Conference League second qualifying round
4	AEK Athens	36	17	9	10	53	45	+8	60	Qualification for the Europa Conference League second qualifying round
5	Panathinaikos	36	14	11	11	41	34	+7	53	
6	Asteras Tripolis	36	12	15	9	36	38	−2	51	

Updated to match(es) played on 5 May 2021. Source: Superleague Greece
Rules for classification: 1) Points; 2) Head-to-head points; 3) Head-to-head goal difference; 4) Head-to-head goals scored; 5) Goal difference; 6) Goals scored

===== Results summary =====
Overall								Home						Away					
Pld	W	D	L	GF	GA	GD	Pts	W	D	L	GF	GA	GD	W	D	L	GF	GA	GD
36	17	10	9	41	26	+15	61	9	4	5	20	12	+8	8	6	4	21	14	+7

Last updated: 16 May 2021.
Source: Super League

===== Results by matchday =====
Matchday	1	2	3	4	5	6	7	8	9	10
Ground	A	H	H	A	H	A	H	A	H	A
Result	L	W	L	W	L	D	D	L	D	D
Position	2	2	2	2	2	2	3	3	3	3

Updated to match(es) played on 16 May 2021. Source: Super League
A = Away; H = Home; W = Win; D = Draw; L = Loss; P = Postponed

===== Matches =====
21 March 2021 1	Olympiacos	1 – 0	Aris Thessaloniki	Piraeus
17:15 EET	Georgios Masouras 38'; Kenny Lala (red card) 41'; Andreas Bouchalakis (yellow card) 50'; José Sá (yellow card) 90+1'	Report	Bruno Gama (yellow card) 15'	Stadium: Karaiskakis Stadium; Referee: Jakob Kehlet (Denmark)

4 April 2021 2	Aris Thessaloniki	2 – 0	Asteras Tripolis	Thessaloniki
17:15 EEST	James Jeggo (yellow card) 17'; Lucas Sasha (yellow card) 57'; Xande Silva 69'; Dimitrios Manos 90+1'	Report	Juan Munafo (yellow card) 16'; Dani Suárez (yellow card) 80'	Stadium: Kleanthis Vikelidis Stadium; Referee: Anastasios Sidiropoulos

11 April 2021 3	Aris Thessaloniki	1 – 3	AEK Athens	Thessaloniki
15:00 EEST	Lindsay Rose (yellow card) 36'; Facundo Bertoglio (yellow card) 54'; Daniel Mancini 56'; Mateo García (yellow card) 74'	Report	Muamer Tanković 12' (pen.); Konstas Galanopoulos (yellow card) 23'; Stratos Svarnas (yellow card) 28'; Stavros Vasilantonopoulos 29'; Karim Ansarifard 37' (pen.); Hélder Lopes (yellow card) 44'; Damian Szymański (yellow card) 74'; Ionuț Nedelcearu (yellow card) 83'; Panagiotis Tsintotas (yellow card) 90+3'	Stadium: Kleanthis Vikelidis Stadium; Referee: Aleksei Kulbakov (Belarus)

18 April 2021 4	Panathinaikos	1 – 2	Aris Thessaloniki	Athens
15:00 EEST	Younousse Sankharé 31', (yellow card) 78'; Fran Vélez (yellow card) 41'; Maurício (yellow card) 44' (yellow-red card) 52'; Argyris Kampetsis (yellow card) 89'; Giannis Bouzoukis (yellow card) 90+5'; Juankar (yellow card) 90+6'	Report	James Jeggo (yellow card) 37'; Dimitrios Manos 62'; Mateo García 65'; Georgios Delizisis (yellow card) 69'; Daniel Mancini (yellow card) 80'	Stadium: Leoforos Alexandras Stadium; Referee: Kristo Tohver (Estonia)

21 April 2021 5	Aris Thessaloniki	0 – 1	PAOK	Thessaloniki
19:30 EEST	Mateo García (yellow card) 31'	Report	Stefan Schwab 6'; Karol Świderski (yellow card) 40'; Baba Rahman (yellow card) 59'; Douglas Augusto (yellow card) 67'; Amr Warda (yellow card) 84' (yellow-red card) 86'	Stadium: Kleanthis Vikelidis Stadium; Referee: Willy Delajod (France)

25 April 2021 6	Asteras Tripolis	1 – 1	Aris Thessaloniki	Tripoli
17:15 EEST	Giannis Christopoulos (yellow card) 35'; Lindsay Rose 81' (o.g.); Triantafyllos Pasalidis (yellow card) 90+3'	Report	Daniel Sundgren (yellow card) 59'; Georgios Delizisis (yellow card) 65'; Daniel Mancini 74'	Stadium: Theodoros Kolokotronis Stadium; Referee: Vassilios Fotias

5 May 2021 7	Aris Thessaloniki	1 – 1	Olympiacos	Thessaloniki
17:15 EEST	Dimitrios Manos 14'; Yohan Benalouane (yellow card) 38'	Report	Lazar Ranđelović (yellow card) 51'; Kostas Fortounis 82'	Stadium: Kleanthis Vikelidis Stadium; Referee: Roi Reinshreiber (Israel)

9 May 2021 8	PAOK	2 – 0	Aris Thessaloniki	Thessaloniki
15:00 EEST	Giannis Michailidis (yellow card) 14'; Stefan Schwab (yellow card) 52', (goal) 69' (pen.); Michael Krmenčík (yellow card) 77'; Andrija Živković 90+1'	Report	Yohan Benalouane (yellow card) 14'; Bruno Gama (yellow card) 54'; Facundo Bertoglio (yellow card) 84'	Stadium: Toumba Stadium; Referee: Aleksei Kulbakov (Belarus)

12 May 2021 9	Aris Thessaloniki	0 – 0	Panathinaikos	Thessaloniki
19:30 EEST	Georgios Delizisis (yellow card) 9'; Dimitrios Manos (yellow card) 90+3'	Report	Federico Macheda (yellow card) 10'; Sotiris Alexandropoulos (yellow card) 17'; Achilleas Poungouras (red card) 71'; Sokratis Dioudis (yellow card) 73'; Maurício (yellow card) 90+2'	Stadium: Kleanthis Vikelidis Stadium; Referee: István Vad (Hungary)

16 May 2021 10	AEK Athens	0 – 0	Aris Thessaloniki	Athens
19:30 EEST	Petros Mantalos (yellow card) 25'; Yevhen Shakhov (yellow card) 38'; Dmytro Chyhrynskyi (yellow card) 61'	Report	Daniel Sundgren (yellow card) 89'; Julián Cuesta (yellow card) 90+2'	Stadium: Athens Olympic Stadium; Referee: Andris Treimanis (Latvia)

=== Greek Football Cup ===
==== Sixth Round ====
20 January 2021 First Leg	Aris Thessaloniki	2 – 0	Asteras Tripolis	Thessaloniki
15:00 EET	Daniel Mancini 69'; Facundo Bertoglio 75'; Emanuel Šakić (yellow card) 78'	Report	Juan Munafo (yellow card) 33'; Dani Suárez (yellow card) 86'	Stadium: Kleanthis Vikelidis Stadium; Referee: Aristeidis Vatsios

4 February 2021 Second Leg	Asteras Tripolis	0 – 2 (0–4 agg.)	Aris Thessaloniki	Tripoli
17:15 EET	Franco Bellocq (yellow card) 14'; Luis Fernández (yellow card) 76'	Report	Dimitrios Manos 45'; Mateo García (yellow card) 17', (goal) 68'	Stadium: Theodoros Kolokotronis Stadium; Referee: Anastasios Sidiropoulos

==== Quarter-finals ====
9 February 2021 First Leg	Olympiacos	2 – 1	Aris Thessaloniki	Piraeus
21:30 EET	Ahmed Hassan 1', 14'; Hugo Cuypers (yellow card) 37'; Ousseynou Ba (yellow card) 68'; Lazar Ranđelović (yellow card) 90'	Report	Ousseynou Ba 4' (o.g.); Yohan Benalouane (yellow card) 82'; James Jeggo (yellow card) 90+3'	Stadium: Karaiskakis Stadium; Referee: Dimitrios Karantonis

4 March 2021 Second Leg	Aris Thessaloniki	1 – 1 (2–3 agg.)	Olympiacos	Thessaloniki
20:00 EET	Bruno Gama 55' (pen.); James Jeggo (yellow card) 71'; Daniel Sundgren (yellow card) 90+4'	Report	Tiago Silva (yellow card) 62'; Andreas Bouchalakis 87'; Ögmundur Kristinsson (yellow card) 89'; Youssef El-Arabi (yellow card) 90'	Stadium: Kleanthis Vikelidis Stadium; Referee: Mattias Gestranius (Finland)

=== UEFA Europa League ===
Aris Thessaloniki finished 5th in the 2019–20 Super League Greece and entered the competition in the Second qualifying round. Due to the COVID-19 pandemic all qualifying matches were played as single leg matches, hosted by one of the teams decided by draw, and were played behind closed doors.

==== Second qualifying round ====
17 September 2020 Single leg	Aris Thessaloniki (Greece)	1 – 2	(Ukraine) Kolos Kovalivka	Thessaloniki
20:00 EEST	Bruno Gama 55', (yellow card) 56'; Lindsay Rose (yellow card) 68'	Report	Andriy Bohdanov (yellow card) 35'; Yevhen Zadoya (yellow card) 37'; Yevhen Novak 47'; Denys Antyukh 63'; Yevhen Morozko (yellow card) 76'; Vitaliy Havrysh (yellow card) 86'	Stadium: Kleanthis Vikelidis Stadium; Referee: Lionel Tschudi (Switzerland)

== Squad statistics ==
=== Appearances ===
As of match played 16 May 2021

#	Position	Nat.	Player	Super League 1		Greek Cup		UEL		Total	
#	Position	Nat.	Player	Apps	Starts	Apps	Starts	Apps	Starts	Apps	Starts
3	DF	(Greece)	Apostolos Martinis	0	0	0	0	0	0	0	0
5	DF	(Greece)	Georgios Delizisis	23	23	4	4	0	0	27	27
6	MF	(Australia) / (England)	James Jeggo	30	23	4	3	1	1	35	27
7	FW	(Argentina) / (Italy)	Daniel Mancini	32	19	2	1	1	0	35	20
8	MF	(Netherlands) / (Cape Verde)	Lerin Duarte	0	0	0	0	0	0	0	0
9	FW	(Greece)	Dimitrios Manos	35	19	4	4	1	0	40	23
10	FW	(Argentina) / (Italy)	Mateo García	29	20	2	2	0	0	31	22
14	FW	(Greece)	Kostas Mitroglou	9	3	1	0	0	0	10	3
16	FW	(Portugal)	Bruno Gama	33	31	3	3	1	1	37	35
17	FW	(Portugal) / (Angola)	Xande Silva	29	11	4	3	0	0	33	14
18	FW	(Argentina) / (Italy)	Facundo Bertoglio	32	26	4	3	1	1	37	30
20	MF	(Albania)	Ergys Kaçe	12	1	4	0	0	0	16	1
21	DF	(Sweden)	Daniel Sundgren	31	26	3	3	0	0	34	29
22	DF	(Romania) / (Spain)	Cristian Ganea	22	17	2	1	1	1	25	19
23	GK	(Spain)	Julián Cuesta	18	18	3	3	1	1	22	22
25	DF	(Greece)	Christos Marmaridis	0	0	0	0	0	0	0	0
26	MF	(Spain)	Javier Matilla	27	19	1	1	1	1	29	21
29	DF	(Tunisia) / (France)	Yohan Benalouane	16	14	2	0	0	0	18	14
30	GK	(France)	Zacharie Boucher	9	9	0	0	0	0	9	9
38	MF	(Greece)	Petros Bakoutsis	1	0	1	0	0	0	2	0
40	DF	(Greece)	Petros Bagalianis	8	0	1	0	0	0	9	0
44	DF	(Cyprus) / (England)	Nicholas Ioannou	9	5	1	0	0	0	10	5
66	DF	(Austria)	Emanuel Šakić	31	24	4	4	0	0	35	28
77	FW	(Brazil)	Bruno Felipe	12	4	2	0	0	0	14	4
88	MF	(Brazil) / (Italy)	Lucas Sasha	35	31	4	4	1	1	40	36
92	DF	(Mauritius) / (France)	Lindsay Rose	34	33	4	4	1	1	39	38
99	GK	(Greece)	Marios Siampanis	9	9	1	1	0	0	10	10
Players who left the club during this season
	FW	(Greece)	Giannis Fetfatzidis	3	3	0	0	1	1	4	4
	GK	(Austria)	Fabian Ehmann	0	0	0	0	0	0	0	0
	DF	(Croatia)	Toni Datković	3	3	0	0	1	1	4	4
	FW	(Spain)	Cristian López	18	5	1	0	1	1	20	6
	MF	(North Macedonia)	Ali Adem	0	0	0	0	0	0	0	0
	FW	(Greece)	Konstantinos Chatzipirpiridis	1	0	0	0	0	0	1	0
	DF	(Greece)	Panagiotis Tsagalidis	1	0	0	0	0	0	1	0
	DF	(Greece)	Panagiotis Sengergis	0	0	0	0	0	0	0	0
Total				36		4		1		41	

=== Goals ===
As of match played 16 May 2021

Ranking	Position	Nat.	Player	Super League 1	Greek Cup	UEL	Total
1	FW	(Greece)	Dimitrios Manos	7	1	0	8
2	FW	(Argentina) / (Italy)	Facundo Bertoglio	6	1	0	7
2	FW	(Portugal)	Bruno Gama	5	1	1	7
4	FW	(Portugal) / (Angola)	Xande Silva	4	0	0	4
4	FW	(Argentina) / (Italy)	Daniel Mancini	3	1	0	4
6	MF	(Brazil) / (Italy)	Lucas Sasha	3	0	0	3
7	MF	(Spain)	Javier Matilla	2	0	0	2
7	DF	(Mauritius) / (France)	Lindsay Rose	2	0	0	2
7	FW	(Greece)	Kostas Mitroglou	2	0	0	2
7	FW	(Argentina) / (Italy)	Mateo García	1	1	0	2
11	FW	(Spain)	Cristian López	1	0	0	1
11	FW	(Greece)	Giannis Fetfatzidis	1	0	0	1
11	MF	(Albania)	Ergys Kaçe	1	0	0	1
11	DF	(Cyprus) / (England)	Nicholas Ioannou	1	0	0	1
11	DF	(Romania) / (Spain)	Cristian Ganea	1	0	0	1
Own Goals				1	1	0	2
Total				41	6	1	48

=== Clean sheets ===
As of match played 16 May 2021

#	Nat.	Player	Super League 1	Greek Cup	UEL	Total
23	(Spain)	Julián Cuesta	8	1	0	9
30	(France)	Zacharie Boucher	6	0	0	6
99	(Greece)	Marios Siampanis	5	1	0	6
Total			19	2	0	21

== Players' awards ==
=== NIVEA MEN Best Goal (Super League 1) ===
Matchday	Nat.	Player	Ref
4th	(Argentina) / (Italy)	Daniel Mancini	
5th	(Portugal)	Bruno Gama	
6th	(Portugal) / (Angola)	Xande Silva	
15th	(Argentina) / (Italy)	Facundo Bertoglio	
24th	(Romania) / (Spain)	Cristian Ganea	
Play-Off / Play-Out
2nd	(Portugal) / (Angola)	Xande Silva	

=== NIVEA MEN Player of the Month (Super League 1) ===
Month	Nat.	Player	Ref
Regular Season
October	(Australia) / (England)	James Jeggo	
January	(Brazil) / (Italy)	Lucas Sasha	
March	(Argentina) / (Italy)	Facundo Bertoglio	
