= Daniel Mancini =

Argentine footballer (born 1996)

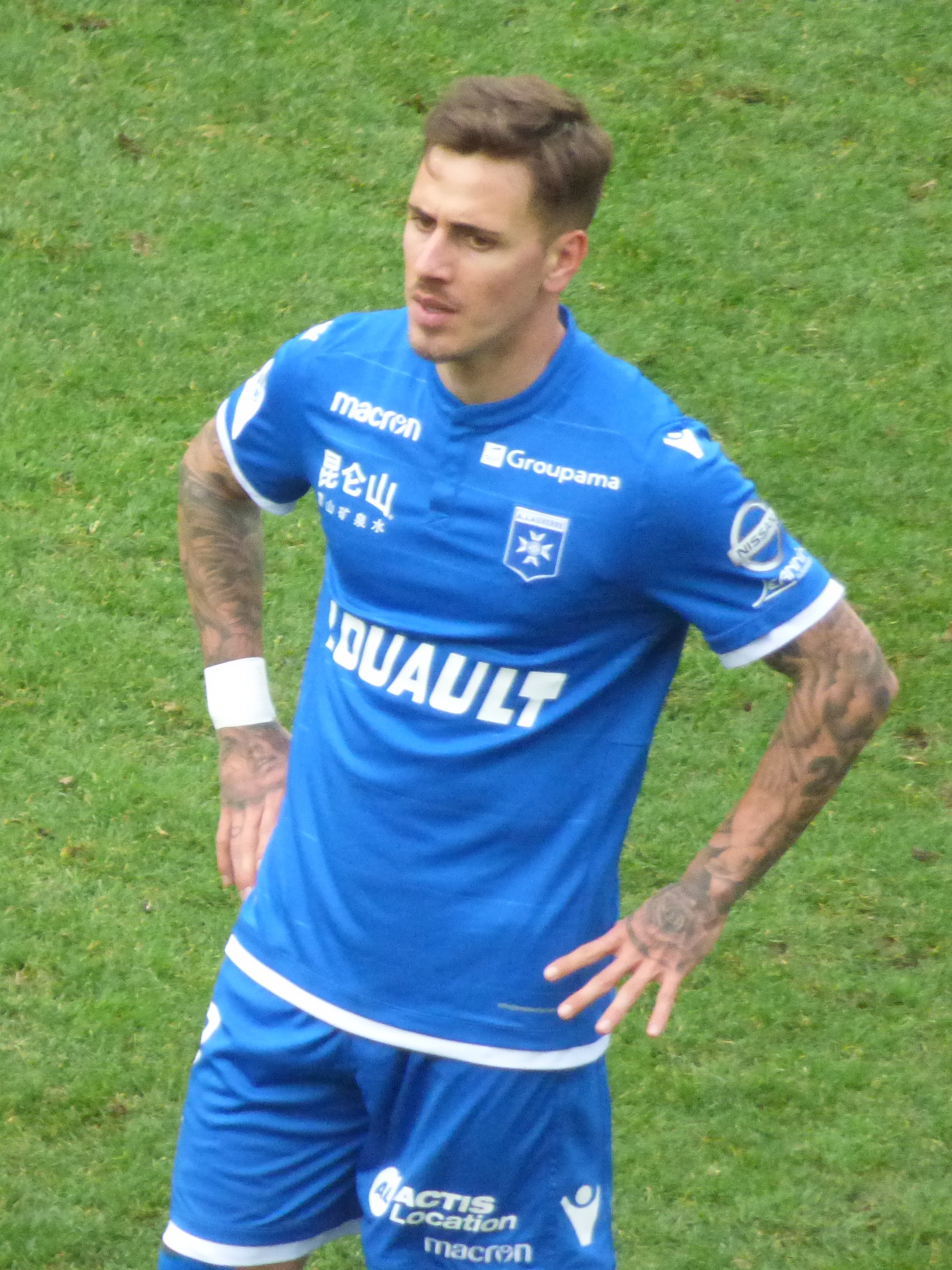
- Mancini in 2019

Personal information
- Full name: Daniel Mancini
- Date of birth: 11 November 1996 (age 29)
- Place of birth: Transito, San Justo Department, Argentina
- Height: 1.72 m (5 ft 8 in)
- Position: Winger

Team information
- Current team: APOEL
- Number: 7

Youth career
- 2008–2014: Proyecto Crecer
- 2014–2015: Newell's Old Boys

Senior career*
| Years | Team | Apps | (Gls) |
| 2015–2017 | Newell's Old Boys | 16 | (2) |
| 2017–2019 | Bordeaux B | 9 | (2) |
| 2017–2019 | Bordeaux | 0 | (0) |
| 2017–2018 | → Tours (loan) | 26 | (4) |
| 2018–2019 | → Auxerre (loan) | 36 | (4) |
| 2019–2023 | Aris | 105 | (12) |
| 2023–2026 | Panathinaikos | 68 | (5) |
| 2026– | APOEL | 16 | (2) |
- * Club domestic league appearances and goals as of 14 June 2026

Daniel Mancini (born 11 November 1996) is an Argentine professional footballer who plays as a winger for Cypriot First Division club APOEL.

== Career ==
Mancini made his professional debut for Newell's Old Boys in a 3–0 win over Racing Club de Avellaneda on 12 July 2015. He transferred to Bordeaux in January 2017.

=== Aris ===
On 22 August 2019, Aris and Bordeaux came to an agreement for the transfer of the Argentine midfielder to the Greek club. Four days later, he arrived in Thessaloniki, ahead of passing his medical tests and signing his new contract. For his purchase, Aris offered an estimated amount of €500,000, making him one of the biggest investments in the history of the club.

On 24 June 2020, he scored his first goal in a 2–2 home draw for the Greek Cup semi finals, which resulted in his team being eliminated.

On 4 October 2020, he scored his first league goal, helping to a 1–0 away win against Panathinaikos, keeping his team on top of the table. This win was the first away from home against Panathinaikos since 2007, and marked Aris' best start in 20 years.

On 20 January 2021, he scored with a helping hand to a 2–0 home win against Asteras Tripolis for the first leg of the Greek Cup round of 16. On 11 April 2021, he scored in a 3–1 home loss against AEK Athens. On 25 April 2021, Mancini scored in an eventual 1–1 away draw against Asteras Tripoli.

On 16 August 2021, he agreed to a contract extension until the summer of 2024.

His first goal for the 2021–22 season came in a 3–1 away win against Atromitos, on 27 September 2021. On 28 November 2021, with an excellent kick scored the only goal sealing a vital 1–0 away win against rivals PAOK, in an episodic game that was accompanied by the invasion of the fans of PAOK on the field.

On 23 February 2022, Mancini scored a brace in a 3–0 home win against Atromitos, keeping his team's hopes for a play-off spot alive.

In the 2022–23 season's opener Mancini scored a brace helping to a 3–0 home win against Levadiakos. Roughly ten days later, Mancini came close to completing a move to Omonia, but the negotiations between the Cypriot club and Aris fell through.

In the late days of September, Aris received another offer for the services of the Argentine winger from an Abu Dhabi based club believed to be in the region of €2,500,000.

=== Panathinaikos ===
On 26 January 2023, he signed for Panathinaikos. On 12 February 2023, Mancini made his return to the Kleanthis Vikelidis Stadium and scored his first goal for Panathinaikos in a 2–1 win over his former club, Aris. He left Panathinaikos on 30 January 2026.

=== APOEL FC ===
On 31 January 2026, APOEL FC announced the signing of Argentine winger Daniel Mancini on a 2½-year contract. Born on 11 November 1996, Mancini joined the Cypriot club after making more than 330 senior career appearances, scoring 39 goals and providing 35 assists. Before his move to APOEL, he had played over 200 matches in the Greek Super League, representing Aris Thessaloniki F.C. and Panathinaikos F.C.. The transfer marked Mancini's first spell in Cypriot football.

At the end of May 2026, following APOEL FC's failure to qualify for European competition for the 2026–27 season, Daniel Mancini left the club by mutual agreement, in accordance with a clause between the two parties linked to the club's failure to secure European qualification.

On 8 July 2026, APOEL FC announced the return of Daniel Mancini for a second spell at the club. Following the completion of the necessary formalities and the signing of a new contract, the Argentine winger rejoined APOEL ahead of the 2026–27 season, strengthening the squad for the upcoming campaign.

== Personal life ==
Mancini holds an Italian passport, as he is of Italian descent.

== Career statistics ==
As of 08 July 2026

Appearances and goals by club, season and competition
| Club | Season | League | | | National cup | | League cup | | Continental | | Total | |
| Club | Season | Division | Apps | Goals | Apps | Goals | Apps | Goals | Apps | Goals | Apps | Goals |
|---|---|---|---|---|---|---|---|---|---|---|---|---|
| Newell's Old Boys | 2015 | Argentine Primera División | 9 | 0 | 0 | 0 | — | | — | | 9 | 0 |
| Newell's Old Boys | 2016 | Argentine Primera División | 7 | 2 | 0 | 0 | — | | — | | 7 | 2 |
| Newell's Old Boys | Total | | 16 | 2 | 0 | 0 | — | | — | | 16 | 2 |
| Bordeaux | 2016–17 | Ligue 1 | 0 | 0 | 0 | 0 | 0 | 0 | — | | 0 | 0 |
| Tours (loan) | 2017–18 | Ligue 2 | 26 | 4 | 1 | 0 | 2 | 2 | — | | 29 | 6 |
| Auxerre (loan) | 2018–19 | Ligue 2 | 36 | 4 | 0 | 0 | 2 | 2 | — | | 38 | 6 |
| Aris Thessaloniki | 2019–20 | Super League Greece | 25 | 0 | 3 | 1 | — | | — | | 28 | 1 |
| Aris Thessaloniki | 2020–21 | Super League Greece | 32 | 3 | 2 | 1 | — | | 1 | 0 | 35 | 4 |
| Aris Thessaloniki | 2021–22 | Super League Greece | 31 | 5 | 3 | 0 | — | | 2 | 0 | 36 | 5 |
| Aris Thessaloniki | 2022–23 | Super League Greece | 17 | 3 | 2 | 1 | — | | 4 | 0 | 23 | 4 |
| Aris Thessaloniki | Total | | 167 | 19 | 11 | 3 | — | | 7 | 0 | 189 | 26 |
| Panathinaikos | 2022–23 | Super League Greece | 17 | 3 | 1 | 0 | — | | — | | 18 | 3 |
| Panathinaikos | 2023–24 | Super League Greece | 30 | 2 | 6 | 0 | — | | 12 | 1 | 48 | 3 |
| Panathinaikos | 2024–25 | Super League Greece | 17 | 0 | 4 | 0 | — | | 12 | 0 | 33 | 0 |
| Panathinaikos | 2025–26 | Super League Greece | 4 | 0 | 3 | 0 | — | | 2 | 0 | 9 | 0 |
| Panathinaikos | Total | | 68 | 5 | 14 | 0 | — | | 26 | 1 | 108 | 6 |
| APOEL | 2025 | Cyprus League by Stoiximan | | | | | | | | | | |
| APOEL | 2025–26 | Cyprus League by Stoiximan | 16 | 3 | 3 | 1 | — | | 0 | 0 | 19 | 4 |
| APOEL | 2026–27 | Cyprus League by Stoiximan | 0 | 0 | 0 | 0 | — | | 0 | 0 | 0 | 0 |
| APOEL | Total | | 16 | 3 | 3 | 1 | 0 | 0 | 0 | 0 | 19 | 4 |
| APOEL | Career total | | 267 | 29 | 28 | 4 | 4 | 4 | 33 | 1 | 332 | 38 |

== Honours ==
Individual

- Aris Thessaloniki Player of the Season: 2021–22
