= Cristian Ganea =

Romanian footballer (born 1992)

Personal information
- Full name: Cristian George Ganea
- Date of birth: 24 May 1992 (age 34)
- Place of birth: Bistrița, Romania
- Height: 1.76 m (5 ft 9 in)
- Positions: Left-back; midfielder

Team information
- Current team: Farul Constanța
- Number: 11

Youth career
- Școala de Fotbal Inter Viișoara
- Basconia
- CD Indartsu
- 2010–2011: Mallorca

Senior career*
Years	Team	Apps	(Gls)
2011–2013	Mallorca B	0	(0)
2011–2012	→ Santanyí (loan)	53	(20)
2013	FCM Târgu Mureș	10	(2)
2013–2014	Universitatea Craiova	29	(5)
2014–2015	Săgeata Năvodari	14	(3)
2015	FC Brașov	16	(2)
2015–2018	Viitorul Constanța	94	(8)
2018–2020	Athletic Bilbao	1	(0)
2019	→ Numancia (loan)	17	(0)
2020	→ Viitorul Constanța (loan)	10	(1)
2020–2022	Aris	52	(1)
2022–2023	Panathinaikos	9	(0)
2023–2024	FCSB	5	(0)
2024–	Farul Constanța	98	(3)

International career^{‡}
2010–2011	Basque Country U18	4	(0)
2017–2021	Romania	8	(0)
- * Club domestic league appearances and goals as of 7 November 2026 ‡ National team caps and goals as of 2 June 2021

Cristian George Ganea (Romanian pronunciation: [kristiˈan ˈdʒe̯ordʒe ˈgane̯a]; born 24 May 1992) is a Romanian professional footballer who plays as a left-back or a midfielder for Liga I club Farul Constanța.

After emerging through the Spanish football system, Ganea returned to Romania at age 21 and moved around several teams before settling at Viitorul Constanța. He won the national title in 2016–17 season with the latter, which prompted a transfer to Athletic Bilbao in 2018. He only made one La Liga appearance, serving loan spells at Numancia and back at Viitorul before being released and signing for Greek club Aris Thessaloniki in 2020.

Internationally, Ganea made his full debut for Romania in June 2017, in a 3–2 friendly victory over Chile.

== Club career ==
=== Early career ===
Ganea moved from Romania to Spain with his family while still a minor. He grew up in Basauri south of Bilbao where his relatives still live, and spent several years playing with local clubs.

In 2010, Ganea signed for RCD Mallorca. After a year with their youth teams, he was assigned to the reserve squad, but was then loaned to local fourth-tier club CD Santanyí for one and a half seasons, during which he played regularly.

=== Return to Romania / Viitorul Constanța ===
In January 2013, Ganea returned to his country of birth to sign for second division club FCM Târgu Mureș. That summer he moved on to CS Universitatea Craiova in the same league, helping them to earn promotion in his sole campaign in Oltenia.

Ganea then transferred to Săgeata Năvodari, staying in the Liga II and this time enduring an administrative relegation as his club were deducted 42 points for unpaid debts and subsequently dissolved during mid-season. Ganea signed with FC Brașov for the latter part of the 2014–15 Liga I, but they too suffered relegation and experienced severe financial problems.

In the summer of 2015, Ganea moved to Viitorul Constanța, owned and coached by former Romanian international Gheorghe Hagi. In the 2015–16 season, the club finished fifth and qualified for the UEFA Europa League. The following campaign, he helped Viitorul win the Romanian league title for the first time in their short history. Ganea was a regular during both seasons, with 58 league starts. He also played in the club's early exits from the qualifying rounds of both the UEFA Champions League and UEFA Europa League.

=== Athletic Bilbao ===
On 15 January 2018, Athletic Bilbao announced the signing of Ganea on a three-year contract with the option of another year, with the player due to join the squad in the summer; he was deemed eligible to join under their signing policy due to his time developing as a young player in the Basque region. Almost as soon as he arrived in Bilbao, the club signed Yuri Berchiche, who was immediately installed as first choice in the left back position, with the previous regular Mikel Balenziaga also still part of the squad and ahead in the queue for selection.

Ganea made his debut for the club on 28 November 2018 in a Copa del Rey game against Huesca, coming on as a substitute in the 73rd minute. Five days later he made his La Liga debut in a 0–3 loss to Levante, but was stretchered off with a torso injury early in the second half of the match and replaced by habitual starter Markel Susaeta. After recovering from the injury, on 9 January 2019 Ganea was loaned to Segunda División side Numancia until June.

After playing regularly in Soria he returned to Athletic Bilbao, but was again afflicted by injuries and made no further appearances before being loaned again, this time back to his former club Viitorul Constanța, in January 2020. The season in Romania was soon postponed due to the COVID-19 pandemic and Ganea's loan spell expired before all fixtures were completed; he went back to Spain in July 2020 with a possibility of participating in Athletic's final few matches, which had also been delayed due to the pandemic, but was not named in any match squads before the end of the campaign. On 11 August 2020, Ganea's contract with Athletic was terminated.

=== Aris ===
On 14 August 2020, he joined Super League Greece side Aris on a two-year contract. On 28 February 2021, he scored his first goal for the club with an exquisite shot in a comfortable 3–0 home win against Atromitos.

== International career ==
Ganea was called up to the Basque Country national under-18 team.

He made his full debut for Romania on 13 June 2017 in a friendly against Chile.

== Personal life ==
Ganea does not hold Spanish citizenship yet. He regarded the Basques as "extraordinary people, with common sense and welcoming." He also praised the Basque Country, saying it's the cleanest and quietest in Spain and that its streets and infrastructure generally do not have a correspondent across the country.

== Career statistics ==
=== Club ===
As of match played 7 November 2026

Appearances and goals by club, season and competition
Club	Season	League			National cup (Note: Includes Cupa României, Copa del Rey, Cypriot Cup)		National cup (Note: Includes Cupa Ligii)		Europe		Other		Total	
Club	Season	Division	Apps	Goals	Apps	Goals	Apps	Goals	Apps	Goals	Apps	Goals	Apps	Goals
Santanyí (loan)	2011–12	Tercera División	33	17	—		—		—		—		33	17
Santanyí (loan)	2012–13	Tercera División	20	3	—		—		—		—		20	3
Santanyí (loan)	Total		53	20	—		—		—		—		53	20
FCM Târgu Mureș	2012–13	Liga II	10	2	—		—		—		—		10	2
Universitatea Craiova	2013–14	Liga II	29	5	2	0	—		—		—		31	5
Săgeata Năvodari	2014–15	Liga II	14	3	2	0	—		—		—		16	3
FC Brașov	2014–15	Liga I	16	2	—		—		—		—		16	2
Viitorul Constanța	2015–16	Liga I	34	3	3	1	1	0	—		—		38	4
Viitorul Constanța	2016–17	Liga I	26	0	1	0	0	0	1 (Note: Appearance in UEFA Europa League)	0	—		28	0
Viitorul Constanța	2017–18	Liga I	34	5	1	0	—		3 (Note: Two appearances and one goal in UEFA Champions League, one appearance in UEFA Europa League)	1	1 (Note: Appearance in Supercupa României)	0	39	6
Viitorul Constanța	Total		94	8	5	1	1	0	4	1	1	0	105	10
Athletic Bilbao	2018–19	La Liga	1	0	1	0	—		—		—		2	0
Numancia (loan)	2018–19	Segunda División	17	0	—		—		—		—		17	0
Viitorul Constanța (loan)	2019–20	Liga I	10	1	—		—		—		—		10	1
Aris	2020–21	Super League Greece	22	1	2	0	—		1	0	—		25	1
Aris	2021–22	Super League Greece	30	0	3	0	—		1 (Note: Appearance in UEFA Europa Conference League)	0	—		34	0
Aris	Total		52	1	5	0	—		2	0	—		59	1
Panathinaikos	2022–23	Super League Greece	9	0	0	0	—		1	0	—		10	0
FCSB	2023–24	Liga I	5	0	3	0	—		—		—		8	0
Farul Constanța	2023–24	Liga I	18	2	—		—		—		—		18	2
Farul Constanța	2024–25	Liga I	39	0	2	0	—		—		—		41	0
Farul Constanța	2025–26	Liga I	32	0	0	0	—		—		—		32	0
Farul Constanța	2026–27	Liga I	9	1	0	0	—		—		—		9	1
Farul Constanța	Total		98	3	2	0	—		—		—		100	3
Career total			408	45	20	1	1	0	7	1	1	0	437	47

=== International ===
As of 2 June 2021

Appearances and goals by national team and year
National team	Year	Apps	Goals
Romania
Romania	2017	5	0
Romania	2020	2	0
Romania	2021	1	0
Total		8	0

== Honours ==
Universitatea Craiova

- Liga II: 2013–14

Viitorul Constanța

- Liga I: 2016–17
- Supercupa României runner-up: 2017

FCSB

- Liga I: 2023–24
