= Mateo García =

Argentine association footballer

Personal information
- Full name: Mateo Ezequiel García
- Date of birth: 10 September 1996 (age 30)
- Place of birth: Córdoba, Argentina
- Height: 1.72 m (5 ft 7 1/2 in)
- Position: Left winger

Team information
- Current team: Newell's Old Boys

Youth career
- Instituto

Senior career*
Years	Team	Apps	(Gls)
2014–2016	Instituto	37	(3)
2016–2019	Las Palmas	19	(2)
2017–2018	→ Osasuna (loan)	11	(0)
2018	→ Alcorcón (loan)	21	(2)
2018–2019	→ Aris (loan)	30	(10)
2019–2020	Red Star Belgrade	15	(4)
2020–2023	Aris	90	(10)
2023–2026	Atlas	60	(4)
2026–	Newell's Old Boys	0	(0)
- * Club domestic league appearances and goals as of 9 March 2026

Mateo Ezequiel García (born 10 September 1996) is an Argentine professional footballer who plays as a left winger for AFA Liga Profesional de Fútbol club Newell's Old Boys.

== Career ==
=== Instituto ===
Born in Córdoba, García graduated from Instituto's youth setup. He made his first team debut on 6 June 2014, coming on as a late substitute in a 0–1 away loss against Defensa y Justicia in the Primera B Nacional.

García scored his first professional goal on 24 May 2015, netting his side's last in a 2–0 win at All Boys. He subsequently established himself as a regular starter, scoring two goals in 2016. Instituto's coach at the time, Héctor Rivoira, praised García, saying that "we have a boy with special qualities. He's different than the rest. We just need to take it easy with him."

=== Las Palmas ===
On 5 August 2016, Instituto announced the sale of García to La Liga side UD Las Palmas for a fee of $440,000. The four-year deal was made official by the Canarians the following day. He made his top-tier debut for the club on 10 September, starting in a 1–2 away loss against Sevilla FC.

García scored his first goal for the Amarillos on 20 December 2016, netting the first in a 2–1 home win against SD Huesca in the season's Copa del Rey. On 10 January 2017, he made an assist and scored a goal in a 2–3 away win against Atlético Madrid in the Copa del Rey Round of 16. His first goal in the league came on 20 January 2017, netting the first in a 1–1 home draw against Deportivo de La Coruña.

On 13 July 2017, García was loaned to CA Osasuna of the Segunda División for a year. The following 11 January, he moved to fellow league team AD Alcorcón, also in a temporary deal.

=== Loan to Aris ===
On 5 July 2018, García joined Super League Greece side Aris on a one-year loan deal. He made his debut on 27 August 2018 and combined it with a goal and an assist, helping to a 3–0 away win against Lamia. On 17 September 2018, he sealed a 2–0 home win against Levadiakos. On 26 September 2018, in the dying minutes of the first half Mateo scored with an excellent finesse shot, equalizing the score in a 1–1 away win against PAOK for the group stages of the Greek Cup. On 30 September 2018, he was the MVP of a 2–0 home win against Asteras Tripolis, having won a penalty and scored the second goal. On 21 October 2018, he scored an early opener in a derby match against PAOK. This goal was not enough to help his team take the three points, as PAOK managed to overturn the score. On 12 November 2018, Mateo opened the score before the first minute was completed in an eventual 2–1 away win against Apollon Smyrnis.

On 31 January 2019, after some very poor performances, he scored the only goal in a 1–0 away win against Xanthi and three days later he defined another game in favour of his team, scoring in a 1–0 home win against PAS Giannina, in the battle for a Europa League spot. Mateo continued his excellent goaling streak, by scoring in an away match against Asteras Tripolis sealing an emphatic 3–0 win.

On 5 May 2019, in the last matchday of the season, he scored a brace in a 7–2 home win against Xanthi. Mateo finished the season with 11 goals and 1 assist in 32 games.

=== Red Star Belgrade ===
On 18 August 2019, García signed a four-year contract with Red Star Belgrade, with his transfer from Las Palmas costing €1.8 million. His transfer was the second most expensive acquisition in Red Star's history at the time, only behind that of Richmond Boakye. On 21 August 2019, he scored a goal on his debut for Red Star in their 2–2 tie with BSC Young Boys in the 2019–20 UEFA Champions League play-off.

=== Return to Aris ===
On 2 October 2020, he returned to Aris, signing a four-year contract. The club paid a fee in excess of €1,300,000. On 18 April 2021, Mateo scored sealing a 2–1 away win against Panathinaikos. This was his first league goal and second in for the Argentine, who has struggled throughout the season.

His first goal of the 2021–22 season came in a 3–1 away win against Atromitos on 27 September 2021.

== Career statistics ==
=== Club ===
As of 2 June 2022

Club	Season	League			National Cup		Continental		Total	
Club	Season	Division	Apps	Goals	Apps	Goals	Apps	Goals	Apps	Goals
Instituto	2015	Primera B Nacional	18	1	0	0	—		18	1
Instituto	2016	Primera B Nacional	19	2	0	0	—		19	2
Instituto	Total		37	3	0	0	—		37	3
Las Palmas	2016–17	La Liga	19	2	4	2	—		23	4
Osasuna (loan)	2017–18	Segunda División	11	0	1	0	—		12	0
Alcorcón (loan)	2017–18	Segunda División	21	2	0	0	—		21	2
Aris (loan)	2018–19	Super League Greece	30	10	2	1	—		32	11
Red Star Belgrade	2019–20	Serbian SuperLiga	15	4	1	0	8	1	24	5
Aris	2020–21	Super League Greece	29	1	2	1	—		31	2
Aris	2021–22	Super League Greece	30	4	3	0	2	0	35	4
Aris	Total		59	5	5	0	2	0	66	6
Career total			192	26	13	4	10	1	215	31

== Honours ==
Red Star Belgrade

- Serbian SuperLiga: 2019–20
