= Emanuel Šakić =

Austrian footballer

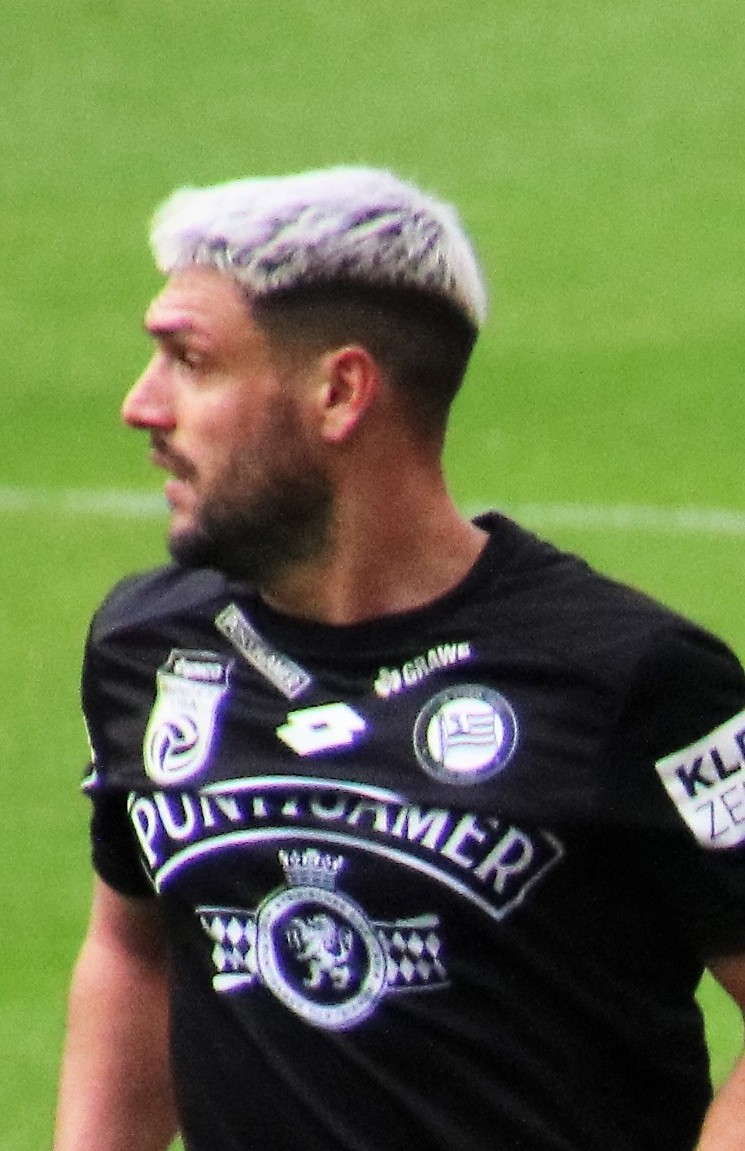
- Šakić in 2020

Personal information
- Date of birth: 25 January 1991 (age 35)
- Place of birth: Vienna, Austria
- Height: 1.77 m (5 ft 9 1/2 in)
- Position: Right-back

Team information
- Current team: AEL
- Number: 66

Youth career
- 1999–2004: DSV Fortuna 05
- 2004–2007: Rapid Wien

Senior career*
Years	Team	Apps	(Gls)
2007–2010	SK Rapid Wien II	22	(0)
2010–2013	Floridsdorfer AC	72	(0)
2013–2016	Austria Lustenau	89	(5)
2016–2018	Altach	19	(1)
2018–2019	Atromitos	38	(1)
2019–2020	Sturm Graz	28	(0)
2020–2022	Aris	49	(1)
2022–2023	Ionikos	26	(0)
2023	A.E. Kifisia	3	(0)
2023–2025	CSKA Sofia	23	(0)
2025–2026	Enosis Neon Paralimni	19	(0)
2026–	AEL	3	(0)

International career^{‡}
2009	Austria U18	2	(0)
- * Club domestic league appearances and goals as of 21 September 2026 ‡ National team caps and goals as of 3 June 2016

Emanuel Šakić (born 25 January 1991) is an Austrian professional footballer who plays as a right-back for Greek Super League 2 club AEL.

== Career ==
On 3 January 2018, Šakić joined Super League Greece club Atromitos on a one-and-a-half-year contract. On 9 December 2018, he scored his first goal for the club, opening the score in an emphatic 4–2 home win against Aris.

He then joined Sturm Graz and in the summer of 2020, he signed a contract with Aris on a free transfer. In September 2023, Šakić signed a two-year contract with Bulgarian club CSKA Sofia.

== Career statistics ==
As of 14 June 2026

Appearances and goals by club, season and competition
Club	Season	League			Cup		Continental		Other		Total	
Club	Season	Division	Apps	Goals	Apps	Goals	Apps	Goals	Apps	Goals	Apps	Goals
Austria Lustenau	2013–14	2. Liga	34	1	3	0	—		—		37	1
Austria Lustenau	2014–15	2. Liga	24	1	1	0	—		—		25	1
Austria Lustenau	2015–16	2. Liga	31	3	1	0	—		—		32	1
Austria Lustenau	Total		89	5	5	0	—		—		94	5
Altach	2016–17	Austrian Bundesliga	16	1	1	0	—		—		17	1
Altach	2017–18	Austrian Bundesliga	3	0	2	1	5	0	—		10	1
Altach	Total		19	1	3	1	5	0	—		27	2
Atromitos	2017–18	Super League Greece	13	0	3	0	—		—		16	0
Atromitos	2018–19	Super League Greece	25	1	5	1	1	0	—		31	2
Atromitos	Total		38	1	8	1	1	0	—		47	2
Sturm Graz	2019–20	Austrian Bundesliga	28	0	4	0	2	0	—		34	0
Aris	2020–21	Super League Greece	31	0	4	0	0	0	—		35	0
Aris	2021–22	Super League Greece	18	1	0	0	2	0	—		20	1
Aris	Total		49	1	4	0	2	0	—		55	1
Ionikos	2022–23	Super League Greece	26	0	0	0	—		—		26	0
A.E. Kifisia	2023–24	Super League Greece	3	0	0	0	—		—		3	0
CSKA Sofia	2023–24	First League	22	0	4	0	—		—		26	0
CSKA Sofia	2024–25	First League	1	0	0	0	—		—		1	0
CSKA Sofia	Total		23	0	4	0	0	0	0	0	27	0
Enosis Neon Paralimni	2025–26	Cypriot First Division	19	0	0	0	—		—		19	0
Career total			294	8	28	2	10	0	0	0	332	10
