= Lumor Agbenyenu =

Ghanaian footballer (born 1996)

Lumor
Personal information
- Full name: Lumor Agbenyenu
- Date of birth: 15 August 1996 (age 30)
- Place of birth: Accra, Ghana
- Height: 1.75 m (5 ft 9 in)
- Position: Left-back

Youth career
- –2016: Wassaman United
- 2014–2015: → Porto (loan)

Senior career*
Years	Team	Apps	(Gls)
–2016	Wassaman United		
2015–2016	→ Portimonense (loan)	19	(0)
2016–2018	Portimonense	51	(1)
2017	→ 1860 Munich (loan)	16	(2)
2018–2021	Sporting CP	8	(0)
2019	→ Göztepe (loan)	9	(0)
2019–2020	→ Mallorca (loan)	23	(1)
2021–2022	Aris	10	(0)
2022–2023	Málaga	2	(0)
2023–2024	A.E. Kifisia	11	(1)
2024–2025	SV Ried	23	(1)

International career^{‡}
2017–	Ghana	13	(0)
- * Club domestic league appearances and goals as of 12 June 2025 ‡ National team caps and goals as of 12:42, 15 July 2019 (UTC)

Lumor Agbenyenu (born 15 August 1996), commonly known as Lumor, is a Ghanaian professional footballer who plays as a left-back.

== Club career ==
=== Early career ===
As a youngster growing up in native Ghana, Lumor Agbenyenu played in the Wassaman Utd schools and was an international for Ghana youngsters. In July 2014, Lumor finally had the opportunity of going to European football when he was loaned to FC Porto, playing for a season in the Junior team.

=== Portimonense move and loan to 1860 Munich ===
In the following season after impressing in the junior teams of Porto, he was loaned again to Portimonense and eventually in February 2016 exerted the option to buy the rights of the young left back. In January 2017 he was loaned to 1860 Munich of the 2. Bundesliga, where he played regularly, but at the end of the season he returned to Portimonense after making his debut in Ghana's main national team.

=== Sporting CP ===
In January 2018, when Lumor was being negotiated by PSV Eindhoven, Sporting CP anticipated and secured the contest of the Ghanaian player, securing 50% of the economic rights of his pass for €2.5 million with the possibility of acquiring in the future another 30% for a value stipulated in €1 million. Lumor signed a long-term contract with Sporting CP, with the goal of replacing the Argentinian Jonathan Silva that had been loaned to AS Roma.

=== Loans to Göztepe and Mallorca ===
On 31 July 2019, after a six-month loan spell at Göztepe, Lumor joined La Liga side Mallorca also in a temporary deal. He featured regularly before returning to his parent club Sporting in July 2020, but spent the entire campaign without playing.

=== Aris ===
On 30 July 2021, Lumor joined Aris on a two-year deal.

=== Málaga ===
On 19 October 2022, he returned to Spain after signing a one-year contract with Málaga in Segunda División, after a trial period. He had his contract terminated by the club due to "disciplinary reasons" the following 15 March, after just three matches.

=== A.E. Kifisia ===
On 10 July 2023, Lumor joined A.E. Kifisia on one-year deal.

=== SV Ried ===
On 31 January 2024, Agbenyenu signed for Austrian 2. Liga club SV Ried on an eighteen-month contract.

== International career ==
Agbenyenu made his debut for the Ghana national team in a 5–0 2019 Africa Cup of Nations qualification win over Ethiopia on 11 June 2017.

== Career statistics ==
=== Club ===
As of 9 September 2023

Appearances and goals by club, season and competition
Club	Season	League			National cup		League cup		Continental		Other		Total	
Club	Season	Division	Apps	Goals	Apps	Goals	Apps	Goals	Apps	Goals	Apps	Goals	Apps	Goals
Portimonense (loan)	2015–16	Liga Portugal 2	19	0	3	0	4	0	—		—		26	0
Portimonense	2015–16	Liga Portugal 2	13	0	—		—		—		—		13	0
Portimonense	2016–17	Liga Portugal 2	21	1	0	0	0	0	—		—		21	1
Portimonense	2017–18	Primeira Liga	17	0	1	0	3	0	—		—		21	0
Portimonense	Total		51	1	1	0	3	0	—		—		55	1
1860 Munich (loan)	2016–17	2. Bundesliga	18	2	1	0	—		—		—		19	2
Sporting CP	2017–18	Primeira Liga	7	0	0	0	—		—		—		7	0
Sporting CP	2018–19	Primeira Liga	1	0	0	0	1	0	0	0	—		2	0
Sporting CP	Total		8	0	0	0	1	0	0	0	—		9	0
Göztepe (loan)	2018–19	Süper Lig	9	0	0	0	—		—		—		9	0
Mallorca (loan)	2019–20	La Liga	23	1	1	0	—		—		—		24	1
Aris	2021–22	Super League Greece	10	0	2	0	—		—		—		12	0
Málaga	2022–23	Segunda División	2	0	1	0	—		—		—		3	0
A.E. Kifisia	2023–24	Super League Greece	3	0	0	0	—		—		—		3	0
Career total			143	4	9	0	8	0	0	0	0	0	160	4

=== International ===
As of matches played on 15 July 2019

Appearances and goals by national team and year
National team	Year	Apps	Goals
Ghana	2017	6	0
Ghana	2018	3	0
Ghana	2019	4	0
Total		13	0

== Honours ==
Sporting CP

- Taça da Liga: 2018–19
- Taça de Portugal: 2018–19
