= Georgios Daviotis =

Greek footballer

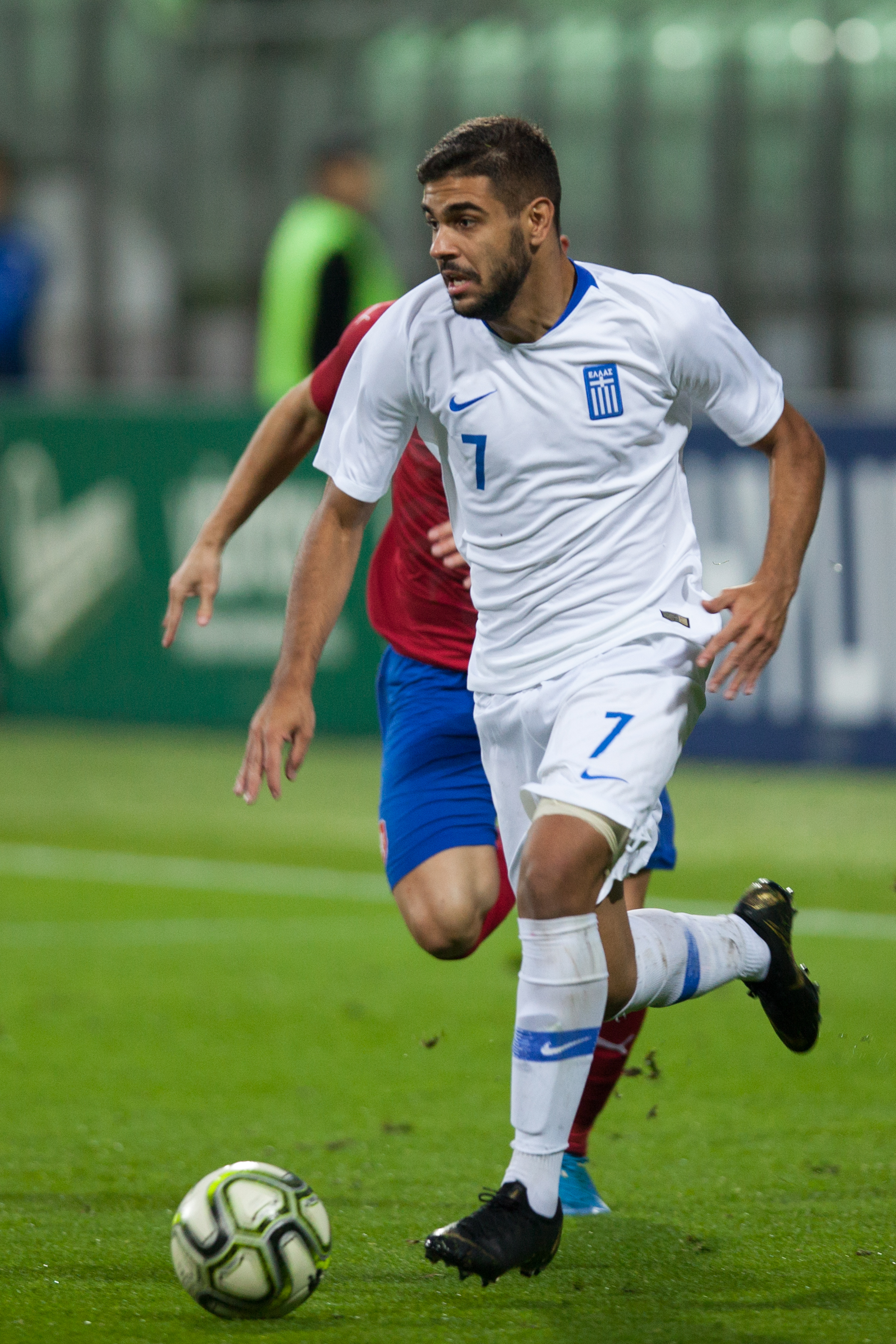
- Daviotis with Greece U21 in 2019

Personal information
- Full name: Georgios Daviotis
- Date of birth: 29 June 1998 (age 28)
- Place of birth: Athens, Greece
- Height: 1.81 m (5 ft 11 in)
- Position: Winger

Team information
- Current team: Egaleo
- Number: 7

Youth career
- –2015: Agios Ierotheos
- 2015–2018: Atromitos

Senior career*
Years	Team	Apps	(Gls)
2018–2022	Atromitos	27	(0)
2022–2023	Proodeftiki	21	(1)
2023–	Egaleo	31	(3)

International career^{‡}
2018–2019	Greece U20	2	(0)
2019	Greece U21	4	(0)
- * Club domestic league appearances and goals as of 15 June 2025 ‡ National team caps and goals as of 25 April 2019

Georgios Daviotis (Greek: Γεώργιος Νταβιώτης; born 29 June 1998) is a Greek professional footballer who plays as a winger for Super League 2 club Egaleo.

== Career ==
=== Atromitos ===
On 4 July 2021, Greek Super League side Atromitos announced the extension of his contract for two more years.

== Career statistics ==
=== Club ===
As of 28 May 2021

Club	Season	League			Cup		Continental		Other		Total	
Club	Season	Division	Apps	Goals	Apps	Goals	Apps	Goals	Apps	Goals	Apps	Goals
Atromitos	2019–20	Super League Greece	12	0	3	0	—		—		15	0
Atromitos	2020–21	Super League Greece	10	0	2	0	—		—		12	0
Atromitos	Total		22	0	5	0	0	0	—		27	0
Career total			22	0	5	0	0	0	0	0	27	0
