= Apostolos Martinis =

Greek association footballer

Personal information
- Full name: Apostolos Ilias Martinis
- Date of birth: 8 January 2001 (age 25)
- Place of birth: Athens, Greece
- Height: 1.81 m (5 ft 11 in)
- Position: Left-back

Team information
- Current team: Olympiacos B
- Number: 80

Youth career
- 2009–2019: Olympiacos

Senior career*
Years	Team	Apps	(Gls)
2017–2020	Olympiacos	1	(0)
2020–2021	Aris	0	(0)
2021–2024	Panathinaikos B	81	(3)
2025	Hibernians	13	(1)
2025–	Olympiacos B	21	(1)

International career^{‡}
2017	Greece U16	4	(2)
2017–2018	Greece U17	17	(0)
2019	Greece U19	1	(0)
- * Club domestic league appearances and goals as of 9 September 2026 ‡ National team caps and goals as of 16 September 2019

Apostolos Martinis (Greek: Απόστολος Μαρτίνης; born 8 January 2001) is a Greek professional footballer who plays as a left-back for Super League Greece 2 club Olympiacos B.

== Career ==
=== Aris ===
On 2 October 2020, Aris officially announced the signing of the young defender on a four-year deal.

== Career statistics ==
As of 4 October 2020

Club	Season	League			Cup		Continental		Other		Total	
Club	Season	Division	Apps	Goals	Apps	Goals	Apps	Goals	Apps	Goals	Apps	Goals
Olympiacos	2018–19	Super League Greece	0	0	1	0	—		—		1	0
Olympiacos	2019–20	Super League Greece	1	0	0	0	—		—		1	0
Olympiacos	Total		1	0	1	0	—		—		2	0
Aris	2020–21	Super League Greece	0	0	0	0	—		—		0	0
Career total			1	0	1	0	0	0	0	0	2	0
