= Kyriakos Aslanidis =

Greek footballer (born 2002)

Personal information
- Date of birth: 11 March 2002 (age 24)
- Place of birth: Serres, Greece
- Height: 1.84 m (6 ft 0 in)
- Position: Centre-back

Team information
- Current team: Panionios
- Number: 4

Youth career
- 2016–2020: Olympiacos
- 2020–2021: Aris

Senior career*
| Years | Team | Apps | (Gls) |
| 2021–2022 | Aris | 2 | (0) |
| 2021 | → Olympiacos Volos (loan) | 0 | (0) |
| 2022–2025 | Volos | 43 | (0) |
| 2025– | Panionios | 8 | (0) |

International career^{‡}
| 2018–2019 | Greece U17 | 9 | (0) |
| 2022–2023 | Greece U21 | 2 | (0) |
- * Club domestic league appearances and goals as of 19 September 2026 ‡ National team caps and goals as of 24 March 2023

Kyriakos Aslanidis (Greek: Κυριάκος Ασλανίδης; born 11 March 2002) is a Greek professional footballer who plays as a centre-back for Super League 2 club Panionios.
