= Triantafyllos Pasalidis =

Greek footballer (born 1996)

Personal information
- Date of birth: 19 July 1996 (age 30)
- Place of birth: Kordelio, Thessaloniki, Greece
- Height: 1.85 m (6 ft 1 in)
- Position: Centre-back

Team information
- Current team: Niki Volos
- Number: 4

Youth career
- Aiginiakos

Senior career*
Years	Team	Apps	(Gls)
2015–2017	Aiginiakos	37	(1)
2017–2021	Asteras Tripolis	83	(3)
2021–2024	OFI	55	(1)
2024	Salernitana	8	(0)
2024–2026	Athens Kallithea	43	(2)
2026–	Niki Volos	5	(0)

International career^{‡}
2017–2018	Greece U21	11	(0)
- * Club domestic league appearances and goals as of 20 April 2026 ‡ National team caps and goals as of 20 November 2018

Triantafyllos Pasalidis (Greek: Τριαντάφυλλος Πασαλίδης; born 19 July 1996) is a Greek professional footballer who plays as a centre-back for Super League 2 club Niki Volos.

== Career ==
=== Asteras Tripolis ===
On 14 February 2017, Asteras Tripolis officially announced that Pasalidis had signed a four-year contract, which would be made effective on 1 July. On 19 August 2017, Pasalidis made his league debut for Asteras Tripolis, in a 2–1 home defeat against PAS Giannina. On 9 September 2017, he scored his first career goal in a 3–1 home loss against Lamia. On 19 November 2017, he scored in a comfortable 3–0 away Super League win against Platanias.

=== OFI ===
On 28 May 2021, OFI officially announced the signing of Pasalidis on a three-year deal.

=== Salernitana ===
On 31 January 2024, Pasalidis signed with Salernitana in Italy for one-and-a-half years.
