= Juan Munafo =

Argentine footballer

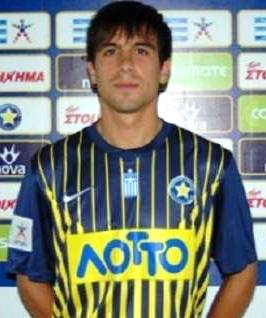

Personal information
- Full name: Juan Manuel Munafo Horta
- Date of birth: 20 March 1988 (age 38)
- Place of birth: Mendoza, Argentina
- Height: 1.71 m (5 ft 7 1/2 in)
- Position: Midfielder

Senior career*
Years	Team	Apps	(Gls)
2008–2009	Boca Juniors II	0	(0)
2009–2013	Panthrakikos	66	(2)
2010–2011	→ Platanias (loan)	25	(0)
2013–2015	Asteras Tripolis	65	(0)
2015–2017	Platanias	59	(3)
2017–2024	Asteras Tripolis	183	(10)
2024–2025	Chania	21	(0)
- * Club domestic league appearances and goals as of 1 July 2025

Juan Manuel Munafo Horta (born 20 March 1988) is an Argentine professional footballer who plays as a midfielder.

== Career ==
His career began in July 2009 when he signed a professional contract with Panthrakikos. He played in Panthrakikos from 2009 to 2013 and in Asteras Tripolis for the next two years. On 31 August 2015, he signed a two years' contract with his former club Platanias for an undisclosed fee.

On 2 August 2017, Asteras Tripolis officially announced the return of experienced defensive midfielder to the club, after two seasons. The 29-year-old Argentine, who was also a member of the ambitious Super League club between 2013 and 2015 (83 performances in all competitions) and has played for Platanias since his first transfer move to Greece back in the summer of 2009 as well, signed two-season contract with the team of manager Staikos Vergetis, who knows him very well from their common spell at Asteras Tripolis, for an undisclosed fee. On 1 October 2017 he scored his first goal, opening the score in a 2–0 home win against AEK Athens, the first in the 2017–18 season. On 4 November 2018, he scored an 88th-minute winner in a 1–0 home win against Panathinaikos.

== Career statistics ==
Season	Club	league	Championship		National cup		Europe		Total	
Season	Club	league	appear	goals	appear	goals	appear	goals	appear	goals
2008–09	Boca Juniors II	Primera B Nacional								
2009–10	Panthrakikos	Super League Greece	3	0	1	0	-	-	4	0
2010–11	Platanias	Football League 2	25	0	0	0	-	-	25	0
2011–12	Panthrakikos	Football League	25	1	2	0	-	-	27	1
2012–13	Panthrakikos	Super League Greece	29	1	0	0	-	-	29	1
2013–14	Asteras Tripolis	Super League Greece	30	0	4	0	0	0	34	0
2014–15	Asteras Tripolis	Super League Greece	35	0	3	0	11	0	49	0
2015–16	Platanias	Super League Greece	23	0	2	0	0	0	25	0
2016–17	Platanias	Super League Greece	27	3	5	0	0	0	32	3
2017–18	Asteras Tripolis	Super League Greece	29	2	3	0	0	0	32	2
2018–19	Asteras Tripolis	Super League Greece	24	0	6	0	2	0	32	0
2019–20	Asteras Tripolis	Super League Greece	26	1	2	0	0	0	28	1
2020–21	Asteras Tripolis	Super League Greece	28	3	1	0	0	0	29	3
2021–22	Asteras Tripolis	Super League Greece	10	0	1	0	0	0	11	0
Career total			314	11	30	0	13	0	357	11
