= Marios Siampanis =

Greek association footballer

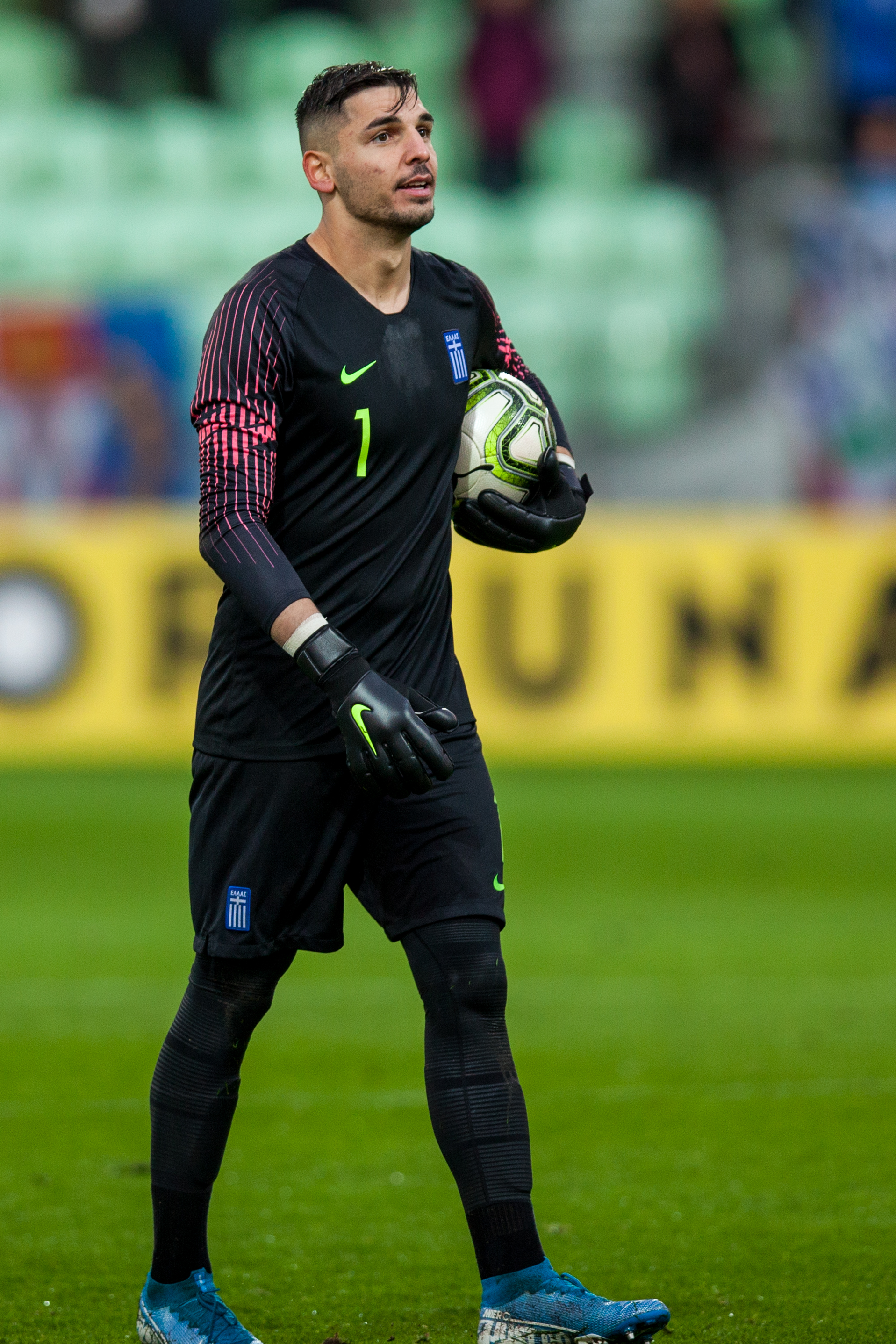
- Siampanis with Greece in 2019

Personal information
- Full name: Marios Siampanis
- Date of birth: 28 September 1999 (age 27)
- Place of birth: Katerini, Greece
- Height: 1.88 m (6 ft 2 in)
- Position: Goalkeeper

Team information
- Current team: Volos
- Number: 1

Youth career
- –2013: Pavlos Melas
- 2013–2015: PAOK

Senior career*
Years	Team	Apps	(Gls)
2015–2019	PAOK	2	(0)
2019–2020	Olympiacos	0	(0)
2019–2020	→ Nottingham Forest (loan)	0	(0)
2020–2023	Aris	19	(0)
2023–	Volos	49	(0)

International career^{‡}
2014–2015	Greece U16	3	(0)
2014–2016	Greece U17	16	(0)
2016–2018	Greece U19	17	(1)
2018–2020	Greece U21	8	(0)
- * Club domestic league appearances and goals as of 5 September 2026 ‡ National team caps and goals as of 17 November 2020

Marios Siampanis (Greek: Μάριος Σιαμπάνης, born 28 September 1999) is a Greek professional footballer who plays as a goalkeeper for Super League club Volos.

== Club career ==
On 14 April 2015 it was announced that Siampanis signed a professional contract with PAOK and started training with the first team. On 10 February 2017 Siampanis extended his contract with PAOK until 2019. According to reports, teenage goalkeeping prospect, Siampanis, could be on his way out of the club despite PAOK officials wanting to keep the talented shot-stopper. Having been at the club since he was just 16 years of age, the youngster has only made two appearances in the senior team and may look for greater opportunities elsewhere.

On 1 July 2019, the 19-year-old international never received a chance with the PAOK senior team, and with his contract expiring this summer, the talented goalkeeper took the decision to leave the club and pen a four years deal with rival team Olympiacos for an undisclosed fee. On 11 August 2019, he joined English Championship club Nottingham Forest on a season-long loan deal from Olympiacos.

On 5 October 2020, following his release from Olympiacos, he signed a three-year contract with Aris.

On 1 July 2023, Siampanis joined Volos on a two-year deal.

== International career ==
On 14 November 2017, Siampanis scored with a penalty kick equalizing the score in a final 2–1 win game against Russia U19 that helped Greece to qualify for the Elite Round.

== Honours ==
PAOK

- Super League: 2018–19
- Greek Cup: 2016–17, 2017–18, 2018–19
