= Panagiotis Tsagalidis =

Greek footballer

Personal information
- Date of birth: 5 March 2001 (age 25)
- Place of birth: Ptolemaida, Greece
- Height: 1.80 m (5 ft 11 in)
- Position: Left-back

Team information
- Current team: Pierikos

Youth career
- 2016–2017: Iraklis Ptolemaidas
- 2017–2018: Olympiacos
- 2018–2020: Aris

Senior career*
| Years | Team | Apps | (Gls) |
| 2019–2022 | Aris | 2 | (0) |
| 2021 | → Olympiacos Volos (loan) | 15 | (3) |
| 2021–2022 | → Kalamata (loan) | 20 | (0) |
| 2022–2023 | Panserraikos | 3 | (0) |
| 2023 | → Apollon Pontus (loan) | 14 | (0) |
| 2023–2024 | Iraklis | 8 | (0) |
| 2024– | Pierikos | 0 | (0) |

International career
| 2018–2019 | Greece U18 | 6 | (0) |
- * Club domestic league appearances and goals as of 10 September 2024

Panagiotis Tsagalidis (Greek: Παναγιώτης Τσαγκαλίδης; born 5 March 2001) is a Greek professional footballer who plays as a left-back.
