= Ali Adem =

Macedonian footballer

Personal information
- Full name: Ali Adem
- Date of birth: 1 June 2000 (age 26)
- Place of birth: Skopje, North Macedonia
- Height: 1.75 m (5 ft 9 in)
- Position: Midfielder

Team information
- Current team: Makedonija GP
- Number: 14

Youth career
- Vardar

Senior career*
Years	Team	Apps	(Gls)
2018–2020	Vardar	40	(3)
2020–2022	Aris	0	(0)
2021	→ Shkupi (loan)	27	(1)
2022	→ Veria (loan)	1	(0)
2022–2024	Shkupi	48	(1)
2024	Flamurtari	4	(0)
2025	Shkupi	1	(0)
2025–	Makedonija GP	27	(1)

International career^{‡}
2018	North Macedonia U19	4	(0)
2021	North Macedonia U21	6	(0)
- * Club domestic league appearances and goals as of 18 June 2026 ‡ National team caps and goals as of 27 March 2022

Ali Adem (born 1 June 2000) is a Macedonian professional footballer who plays as a midfielder for Makedonija GP.
