= Zacharie Boucher =

French footballer (born 1992)

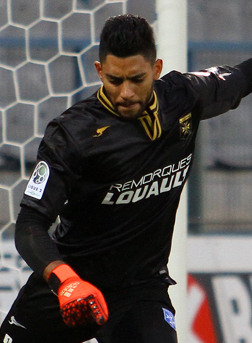

Personal information
- Date of birth: 7 March 1992 (age 34)
- Place of birth: Saint-Pierre, Réunion, France
- Height: 1.80 m (5 ft 11 in)
- Position: Goalkeeper

Team information
- Current team: Troyes
- Number: 1

Youth career
- 2000–2007: Stade Tamponnaise
- 2006–2007: CREPS Réunion
- 2007–2011: Le Havre

Senior career*
Years	Team	Apps	(Gls)
2010–2014	Le Havre	65	(0)
2014–2015	Toulouse	32	(0)
2015–2020	Auxerre	112	(0)
2018–2019	→ Angers (loan)	2	(0)
2020–2021	Aris	9	(0)
2022–2024	Bastia	11	(0)
2024	→ Troyes (loan)	0	(0)
2024–	Troyes	11	(0)

International career
2007–2008	France U16	9	(0)
2008–2009	France U17	13	(0)
2009–2010	France U18	7	(0)
2010–2011	France U19	9	(0)
2011–2013	France U20	7	(0)
2013–2014	France U21	6	(0)
- * Club domestic league appearances and goals as of 11 May 2026

Zacharie Boucher (born 7 March 1992) is a French professional footballer who plays as a goalkeeper for Ligue 1 club Troyes. He was a French youth international and has served as the number one goalkeeper at under-16, under-17, and under-18 level.

== Club career ==
=== Le Havre ===
Born in Saint-Pierre, Réunion, Boucher began his professional career at Le Havre. For the 2010–11 season, he was installed as the club's third goalkeeper behind starter Mike Van Hamel and backup Johny Placide. He made his professional debut on 29 July 2011 in a 2–1 win over Istres appearing as a substitute for starting goalkeeper Placide in the first half.

=== Toulouse ===
After being voted the Best Goalkeeper in Ligue 2 for 2013, Boucher signed with Ligue 1 outfit Toulouse in the 2013–14 winter transfer window. He quickly displaced Comorian international, Ali Ahamada, and with a series of excellent displays, helped the club to a credible 9th-place finish. The 2014–15 season did not go as well as his first, with him losing his starting place and having to share goalkeeping duties, where the club only narrowly avoided relegation as they finished in 17th place.

=== Auxerre ===
In July 2015, Boucher decided against staying at Toulouse and transferred to Ligue 2 club Auxerre, where he would be the undisputed first choice goalkeeper. He expressed his desire to one day return to the top flight, of which he knew he was capable of playing in, but believed remaining at Auxerre for the near future would be more beneficial for his development.

At the beginning of the 2018–19 season, he lost his starting place at Auxerre to Quentin Westberg in the league and to Sonny Laiton in the Coupe de la Ligue.

=== Angers ===
On 31 August 2018, the last day of the 2018 summer transfer window, Boucher joined Ligue 1 side Angers on loan for the season.

=== Aris ===
On 9 September 2020, he signed a two-year contract with Aris. On 12 June 2021, Aris announced that Boucher had been released.

=== Bastia ===
On 11 January 2022, he signed for Ligue 2 club Bastia.

=== Troyes ===
On 1 July 2024, after spending the second half of the 2023–24 season on loan at Troyes, Boucher was signed on a permanent deal by the Ligue 2 club.

== International career ==
Born in Réunion, Boucher is of Malagasy descent and was approached to join the Madagascar national team in March 2018. He is a youth international for France.

In September 2026, Boucher was called up to Madagascar for the first time for their 2027 Africa Cup of Nations qualification games against Nigeria and Tanzania. Boucher had his call-up revoked only a few days later after an interview with L'Équipe in October 2018 resurfaced, in which Boucher stated "I am French, I have never been Malagasy [...] The French national team jersey is important to me. I won’t wear any other jersey than that one. I am French, proud to be so, and I have no intention of playing the AFCON with anyone else".

== Career statistics ==
As of match played 31 May 2026

Appearances and goals by club, season and competition
Club	Season	League			National cup		League cup		Continental		Total	
Club	Season	Division	Apps	Goals	Apps	Goals	Apps	Goals	Apps	Goals	Apps	Goals
Le Havre	2011–12	Ligue 2	16	0	0	0	1	0	—		17	0
Le Havre	2012–13	Ligue 2	29	0	3	0	1	0	—		33	0
Le Havre	2013–14	Ligue 2	20	0	0	0	0	0	—		20	0
Le Havre	Total		65	0	3	0	2	0	—		70	0
Toulouse	2013–14	Ligue 1	17	0	—		—		—		17	0
Toulouse	2014–15	Ligue 1	14	0	0	0	0	0	—		14	0
Toulouse	Total		31	0	0	0	0	0	—		31	0
Auxerre	2015–16	Ligue 2	36	0	0	0	2	0	—		38	0
Auxerre	2016–17	Ligue 2	38	0	5	0	3	0	—		46	0
Auxerre	2017–18	Ligue 2	35	0	0	0	1	0	—		36	0
Auxerre	2018–19	Ligue 2	2	0	0	0	0	0	—		2	0
Auxerre	2019–20	Ligue 2	1	0	2	0	1	0	—		4	0
Auxerre	Total		112	0	7	0	7	0	—		126	0
Angers (loan)	2018–19	Ligue 1	2	0	0	0	1	0	—		3	0
Aris	2020–21	Super League Greece	9	0	0	0	—		0	0	9	0
Bastia	2021–22	Ligue 2	4	0	0	0	—		—		4	0
Bastia	2022–23	Ligue 2	5	0	4	0	—		—		9	0
Bastia	2023–24	Ligue 2	2	0	0	0	—		—		2	0
Bastia	Total		11	0	4	0	—		—		15	0
Troyes	2023–24	Ligue 2	0	0	0	0	—		—		0	0
Troyes	2024–25	Ligue 2	9	0	0	0	—		—		9	0
Troyes	2025–26	Ligue 2	2	0	0	0	—		—		2	0
Troyes	Total		11	0	0	0	—		—		11	0
Career total			241	0	14	0	10	0	0	0	265	0

== Honours ==
Individual

- Toulon Tournament Best Goalkeeper: 2013
- Ligue 2 Goalkeeper of the Year: 2012–13
