= Panagiotis Sengiergis =

Greek footballer

Panagiotis Sengergis
Personal information
- Full name: Panagiotis Sengergis
- Date of birth: 23 June 2001 (age 25)
- Place of birth: Greece
- Position: Left-back

Team information
- Current team: Thermaikos Thermis

Youth career
- Aris

Senior career*
Years	Team	Apps	(Gls)
2020–2022	Aris	0	(0)
2021	→ Triglia (loan)	10	(0)
2022–2023	Iraklis	2	(0)
2023–	Thermaikos Thermis	?	(?)
- * Club domestic league appearances and goals as of 11 September 2024

Panagiotis Sengiergis (Greek: Παναγιώτης Σενγκιέργκης; born 23 June 2001) is a Greek professional footballer who plays as a left-back.
