= 2025–26 Aris Thessaloniki F.C. season =

Aris Thessaloniki
- President: Irini Karipidis
- Manager: Marinos Ouzounidis
- Stadium: Kleanthis Vikelidis Stadium
- Super League 1: 7th
- Greek Cup: Quarter-finals
- UEFA Conference League: Second qualifying round
- Top goalscorer: League: Loren Morón (3); All: Loren Morón (7)
Home colours	Away colours	Third colours

The 2025–26 season is the 112th season in the existence of Aris Thessaloniki and the club's 8th consecutive season in the top flight of Greek football since their return there. In addition to the Super League 1, Aris are participating in this season's editions of the Greek Cup and the UEFA Conference League.

At the begin of season Aris Thessaloniki announced Rubén Reyes in the role of Technical Director.

== First-team squad ==
#	Name	Nationality	Position(s)	Date of birth (age)	Signed from
Goalkeepers
20	Filip Sidklev	(Sweden)	GK	12 March 2005 (age 21)	(Sweden) Brommapojkarna
21	Lovro Majkić	(Croatia)	GK	8 October 1999 (age 27)	(Croatia) Istra 1961
23	Julián Cuesta (captain)	(Spain)	GK	28 March 1991 (age 35)	(Poland) Wisła Kraków
33	Georgios Athanasiadis	(Greece)	GK	7 April 1993 (age 33)	(Cyprus) AEK Larnaca
91	Emiliano Karaj	(Albania) / (Greece)	GK	19 September 2005 (age 21)	Academy
Defenders
4	Fabiano Leismann	(Brazil)	CB / RB	18 November 1991 (age 34)	(Turkey) Denizlispor
14	Jakub Brabec (vice-captain)	(Czech Republic)	CB	6 August 1992 (age 34)	(Czech Republic) Viktoria Plzeň
15	Álvaro Tejero	(Spain)	RB / LB / RM	20 July 1996 (age 30)	(Spain) Espanyol
17	Martin Frýdek	(Czech Republic)	LB / LM / CM	24 March 1992 (age 34)	(Switzerland) Luzern
24	Pedro Álvaro	(Portugal)	CB / DM	2 March 2000 (age 26)	(Portugal) Estoril
27	Noah Fadiga	(Senegal) / (Belgium)	RB / RM	3 December 1999 (age 26)	(Belgium) KAA Gent
37	Hamza Mendyl	(Morocco) / (Ivory Coast)	LB / LM	21 October 1997 (age 29)	(Belgium) OH Leuven
92	Lindsay Rose	(Mauritius) / (France)	CB / RB	8 February 1992 (age 34)	(Poland) Legia Warsaw
-	Noah Sonko Sundberg	(The Gambia) / (Sweden)	CB	6 June 1996 (age 30)	(Bulgaria) Ludogorets
Midfielders
8	Monchu Rodríguez	(Spain)	CM / DM	13 September 1999 (age 27)	(Spain) Real Valladolid
10	Uroš Račić	(Serbia)	DM / CM	17 March 1998 (age 28)	(Italy) Sassuolo
18	Olimpiu Moruțan	(Romania)	AM / CM / RW	25 April 1999 (age 27)	(Turkey) MKE Ankaragücü
25	Mamadou Gning	(Senegal)	AM / CM / LW	22 December 2006 (age 19)	(Senegal) Espoirs de Guédiawaye
30	Jean Jules	(Cameroon)	DM / CM	23 April 1998 (age 28)	(Poland) Górnik Zabrze
97	Fredrik Jensen	(Finland)	AM / LW / RW	9 September 1997 (age 29)	(Germany) FC Augsburg
-	Domagoj Pavičić	(Croatia)	CM / DM / AM	9 March 1994 (age 32)	(Turkey) Konyaspor
-	Gabriel Misehouy	(Netherlands) / (Ghana)	AM / CM / LW	18 July 2005 (age 21)	(Spain) Girona
Forwards
7	Carles Pérez	(Spain)	RW / LW / AM	16 February 1998 (age 28)	(Spain) Celta
9	Álvaro Zamora	(Costa Rica)	LW / RW / ST	9 March 2002 (age 24)	(Costa Rica) Saprissa
19	Robin Quaison	(Sweden) / (Ghana)	ST / SS / LW	9 October 1993 (age 33)	Free Agent
28	Dudu Rodrigues	(Brazil)	RW	17 July 2002 (age 24)	(Bulgaria) Cherno More
41	Konstantinos Charoupas	(Greece)	LW / RW / AM	21 September 2007 (age 19)	Academy
70	Giannis Gianniotas	(Greece)	RW / RM	29 April 1993 (age 33)	(Greece) Levadiakos
77	Michalis Panagidis	(Greece)	LW / RW / AM	11 February 2004 (age 22)	Academy
80	Loren Morón	(Spain)	ST	30 December 1993 (age 32)	(Spain) Real Betis
99	Clayton Diandy	(Senegal) / (Guinea-Bissau)	LW / RW / ST	29 July 2006 (age 20)	(Senegal) Espoirs de Guédiawaye
-	Pione Sisto	(Denmark) / (South Sudan)	LW / RW / AM	4 February 1995 (age 31)	(Turkey) Alanyaspor
-	Anastasios Donis	(Greece) / (England)	LW / RW / SS	29 August 1996 (age 30)	(Cyprus) APOEL
-	Tino Kadewere	(Zimbabwe)	ST / RW / LW	5 January 1996 (age 30)	(France) FC Nantes

== Transfers and loans ==
=== Transfers in ===
Entry date	Position	No.	Player	From club	Fee	Ref.
June 2025	DF	27	(Senegal) / (Belgium) Noah Fadiga	(Belgium) KAA Gent	1.500.000 €	
June 2025	FW	-	(Greece) / (England) Anastasios Donis	(Cyprus) APOEL	Free	
June 2025	DF	24	(Portugal) Pedro Álvaro	(Portugal) Estoril	Free	
June 2025	FW	70	(Greece) Giannis Gianniotas	(Greece) Levadiakos	Free	
June 2025	GK	33	(Greece) Georgios Athanasiadis	(Cyprus) AEK Larnaca	Free	
July 2025	GK	21	(Croatia) Lovro Majkić	(Croatia) Istra 1961	200.000 €	
July 2025	MF	97	(Finland) Fredrik Jensen	(Germany) FC Augsburg	Free	
July 2025	DF	15	(Spain) Álvaro Tejero	(Spain) Espanyol	Free	
July 2025	MF	10	(Serbia) Uroš Račić	(Italy) Sassuolo	3.000.000 €	
July 2025	MF	18	(Romania) Olimpiu Moruțan	(Turkey) MKE Ankaragücü	Free	
July 2025	FW	9	(Zimbabwe) Tino Kadewere	(France) FC Nantes	Free	

=== Transfers out ===
Exit date	Position	No.	Player	To club	Fee	Ref.
May 2025	DF	22	(Spain) Hugo Mallo	Free Agent	Released	
June 2025	MF	16	(Czech Republic) Vladimír Darida	Free Agent	Released	
June 2025	DF	4	(Spain) Fran Vélez	Free Agent	Released	
June 2025	FW	11	(Ecuador) / (Spain) Kike Saverio	Free Agent	Released	
June 2025	DF	18	(Spain) / (Argentina) Valentino Fattore	Free Agent	Released	
June 2025	DF	21	(Spain) Rubén Pardo	Free Agent	Released	
June 2025	DF	27	(Spain) Juankar	Free Agent	Released	
June 2025	DF	33	(Spain) Martín Montoya	Free Agent	Released	
July 2025	FW	10	(Greece) Giannis Fetfatzidis	Retired		
July 2025	GK	31	(Greece) Konstantinos Kyriazis	(Spain) Conquense	Released	

=== Loans in ===
Start date	End date	Position	No.	Player	From club	Fee	Ref.
July 2025	June 2026	FW	7	(Spain) Carles Pérez	(Spain) Celta	None	
July 2025	June 2026	MF	26	(Netherlands) / (Ghana) Gabriel Misehouy	(Spain) Girona	None	
July 2025	June 2026	DF	20	(The Gambia) / (Sweden) Noah Sonko Sundberg	(Bulgaria) Ludogorets	None	

== Competitions ==
=== Overall record ===
Competition	First match	Last match	Starting round	Final position	Record							
Competition	First match	Last match	Starting round	Final position	Pld	W	D	L	GF	GA	GD	Win %
Super League 1	23 August 2025	TBD	Matchday 1		17	5	6	6	14	18	−4	29.41
Greek Cup	16 September 2025	14 January 2026	League phase	Quarter-finals	5	3	1	1	6	5	+1	60.00
UEFA Conference League	24 July 2025	31 July 2025	Second qualifying round	Second qualifying round	2	0	1	1	3	4	−1	0.00
Total					24	8	8	8	23	27	−4	33.33

Last updated: 18 January 2026
Source: Soccerway

=== Super League Greece ===
==== League table ====
Pos	Team	Pld	W	D	L	GF	GA	GD	Pts	Qualification or relegation
6	OFI	26	10	2	14	34	45	−11	32	Qualification for the Europe play-offs
7	Volos	26	9	4	13	26	38	−12	31	Qualification for the Europe play-offs
8	Aris	26	6	12	8	20	27	−7	30	Qualification for the Europe play-offs
9	Atromitos	26	7	8	11	26	30	−4	29	Qualification for the Relegation play-outs
10	A.E. Kifisia	26	6	9	11	32	42	−10	27	Qualification for the Relegation play-outs

Source: Super League Greece
Rules for classification: 1) Points; 2) Head-to-head points; 3) Head-to-head goal difference; 4) Overall goal difference; 5) Goals scored; 6) Total wins; 7) Away goals scored; 8) Away wins.

==== Regular season ====
===== Results summary =====
Overall								Home						Away					
Pld	W	D	L	GF	GA	GD	Pts	W	D	L	GF	GA	GD	W	D	L	GF	GA	GD
25	6	12	7	20	25	−5	30	2	9	1	10	9	+1	4	3	6	10	16	−6

Last updated: 14 March 2026.
Source: Soccerway

==== Results by round ====
Round	1	2	3	4	5	6	7	8	9	10	11	12	13	14	15	16	17	18	19	20	21	22	23	24	25	26
Ground	H	H	A	A	H	A	H	A	A	H	A	H	A	H	A	H	A	H	A	H	A	H	A	H	A	H
Result	W	L	W	W	D	L	D	D	L	D	L	W	L	D	W	D	L	D	W	D	D	D	L	D	D	
Position	3	7	4	4	4	6	7	6	8	7	7	7	8	8	7	7	7	7	6	6	6	6	6	6	6	

Source: Super League
A = Away; H = Home; W = Win; D = Draw; L = Loss; P = Postponed

==== Matches ====
23 August 2025 1	Aris	2-0	Volos	Thessaloniki
20:00 EET	Mendyl (yellow card) 3'; Pérez (yellow card) 48'; Pedro Álvaro 64'; Fabiano 67'	Report	Kargas (yellow card) 10'; Comba (yellow card) 26'; Mygas (yellow card) 52'; Hermannsson (yellow card) 76'	Stadium: Kleanthis Vikelidis Stadium; Attendance: 6,652; Referee: (Greece) Alexandros Tsakalidis

30 August 2025 2	Aris	0-2	Panetolikos	Thessaloniki
21:00 EET			Unai García (yellow card) 24'; Michalak (yellow card) 43'; Aguirre 65'; Manrique (yellow card) 69'; Luís (yellow card) 77'; Aleksić 87'; Kojić (yellow card) 89'; Stajić (yellow card) 90+4'	Stadium: Kleanthis Vikelidis Stadium; Attendance: 6,253; Referee: (Greece) Christos Vergetis

13 September 2025 3	Atromitos	1-2	Aris	Athens
20:00 EET	Tzovaras 18'; Quini (yellow card) 84'	Report	Mendyl (yellow card) 31'; Dudu 32'; Morón 56'; Monchu (yellow card) 81'	Stadium: Peristeri Stadium; Attendance: 1,496; Referee: (Greece) Vasilios Fotias

20 September 2025 4	A.E. Kifisia	0-1	Aris	Nikaia
18:00 EET	Chouchoumis (red card) 45+4'; David Simón (yellow card) 77'	Report	Monchu (yellow card) 41'; Račić (yellow card) 71'; Tejero (yellow card) 76'; Misehouy 87'	Stadium: Neapoli Stadium; Attendance: 1,013; Referee: (Greece) Meletis Gioumatzidis

27 September 2025 5	Aris	1-1	Panserraikos	Thessaloniki
20:30 EET	Monchu 43'; Morón (yellow card) 48'; Gianniotas (yellow card) 90'	Report	De Marco (yellow card) 14'; Nunnely (yellow card) 25'; Ivan 50'; Viktor Rumyantsev (yellow card) 63'; Lyratzis (yellow card) 90+1'	Stadium: Kleanthis Vikelidis Stadium; Attendance: 5,899; Referee: (Greece) Angelos Evangelou

4 October 2025 6	OFI	3-0	Aris	Tripoli
18:00 EET	Salcedo 18' (yellow card) 84'; Chatzitheodoridis (yellow card) 19'; Apostolakis (yellow card) 33' (goal) 80'; Neira 61'; Marinakis (yellow card) 75'	Report		Stadium: Theodoros Kolokotronis Stadium; Attendance: 147; Referee: (Greece) Athanasios Tzilos

=== Greek Cup ===
Aris Thessaloniki fineshed in Top 8 in Super League 1 the previous season. So the team entered in the league phase of the new format of the competition.

==== League phase ====
Pos	Team	Pld	W	D	L	GF	GA	GD	Pts	Qualification
3	AEK Athens	4	4	0	0	6	1	+5	12	Advance to Quarter-finals
4	Panathinaikos	4	4	0	0	6	2	+4	12	Advance to Quarter-finals
5	Aris	4	3	1	0	6	2	+4	10	Advance to Play-offs (seeded)
6	OFI	4	3	0	1	7	3	+4	9	Advance to Play-offs (seeded)
7	Volos	4	2	1	1	10	7	+3	7	Advance to Play-offs (seeded)

Updated to match(es) played on 17 December 2025. Source: epo.gr

17 September 2025 1	Panetolikos	0–1	Aris	Agrinio
15:00 EEST		Report	Morón 90+2' (pen.)	Stadium: Panetolikos Stadium; Referee: Stavros Tsimenteridis (Kozani)

23 September 2025 2	Aris	1–0	Marko	Thessaloniki
20:00 EEST	Misehouy 16'	Report		Stadium: Kleanthis Vikelidis Stadium; Referee: Georgios Kokkinos (Chalkidiki)

29 October 2025 3	Egaleo	1–3	Aris	Karditsa
15:00 EET	Fofana 54'	Report	Rose 29'; Sundberg 59'; Morón 90+5'	Stadium: Municipal Stadium of Karditsa; Referee: Panagiotis Koukoulas (Lesbos)

3 December 2025 4	Aris	1–1	PAOK	Thessaloniki
21:30 EET	Dudu 47'	Report	Giakoumakis 90+6'	Stadium: Kleanthis Vikelidis Stadium; Referee: Anastasios Papapetrou (Athens)

==== Quarter-finals ====
14 January 2026	Panathinaikos	3–0	Aris	Marousi
20:30 EET	Bakasetas 16', 53' (pen.), 65' (pen.)			Stadium: Athens Olympic Stadium; Referee: Angelos Evangelou (Athens)

=== UEFA Conference League ===
By finishing fifth in the Super League the previous season, Aris entered the UEFA Conference League in the second qualifying round.

==== Second qualifying round ====
The draw for the second qualifying round was made on 18 June 2025.

24 July 2025 First leg	Araz-Naxçıvan (Azerbaijan)	2–1	(Greece) Aris Thessaloniki	Baku
19:00 EEST	Bekhtiyar Hasanalizade (yellow card) 43'; Ba-Muaka Simakala (yellow card) 45+2'; Slavik Alxasov (yellow card) 66'; Patrick Andrade (yellow card) 67', (goal) 78'; Felipe Santos 75'; Wanderson Maranhão (yellow card) 86'; Igor Ribeiro (yellow card) 86'; Cristian Avram (yellow card) 90+4'; Qara Qarayev (yellow card) 90+7'	Report	Hamza Mendyl (yellow card) 47'; Loren Morón 66'; Clayton Diandy (yellow card) 73'; Giannis Gianniotas (yellow card) 80'; Álvaro Tejero (yellow card) 86'	Stadium: Dalga Arena; Attendance: 1,800; Referee: Andrei Chivulete (Romania)

31 July 2025 Second leg	Aris (Greece)	2–2 (3–4 agg.)	(Azerbaijan) Araz-Naxçıvan	Kleanthis Vikelidis Stadium, Thessaloniki
20:15 (21:15 UTC+3)	Leismann 62'; Monchu 90'	Report	Boli 11'; Santos 38' (pen.)	Attendance: 14,897; Referee: David Dickinson (Scotland)

== Squad statistics ==
=== Goals ===
As of match played 15 January 2026

Ranking	Pos.	Nat.	Player	Super League	Greek Cup	Conference League	Total
1	FW	(Spain)	Loren Morón	3	3	1	7
Total				3	3	1	7
