= 2024 Greek Football Cup final =

2024 Greek Cup final
- Match poster
- Event: 2023–24 Greek Football Cup
Panathinaikos	Aris
1	0
- Date: 25 May 2024
- Venue: Panthessaliko Stadium, Volos
- Man of the Match: Georgios Vagiannidis (Panathinaikos)
- Referee: Stéphanie Frappart (France)
- Attendance: Behind closed doors
- Weather: Fair; 21 °C (70 °F); 60% humidity

The 2024 Greek Cup final was the 80th final of the Greek Cup. It took place on 25 May 2024 at Panthessaliko Stadium. The contesting teams were Panathinaikos and Aris. It was Panathinaikos' thirty first Greek Cup final in their 116 years of existence and Aris' tenth Greek Cup final of their 110-year history. After the end of the match having strong complaints from the refereeing, officials of Aris, alongside the president of the club Thodoros Karipidis, verbally attacked the referee, who went with a police escort to the locker room. Thus, as protest and in risk of punishment, they did not present to receive the medals of the runners-up.

== Venue ==
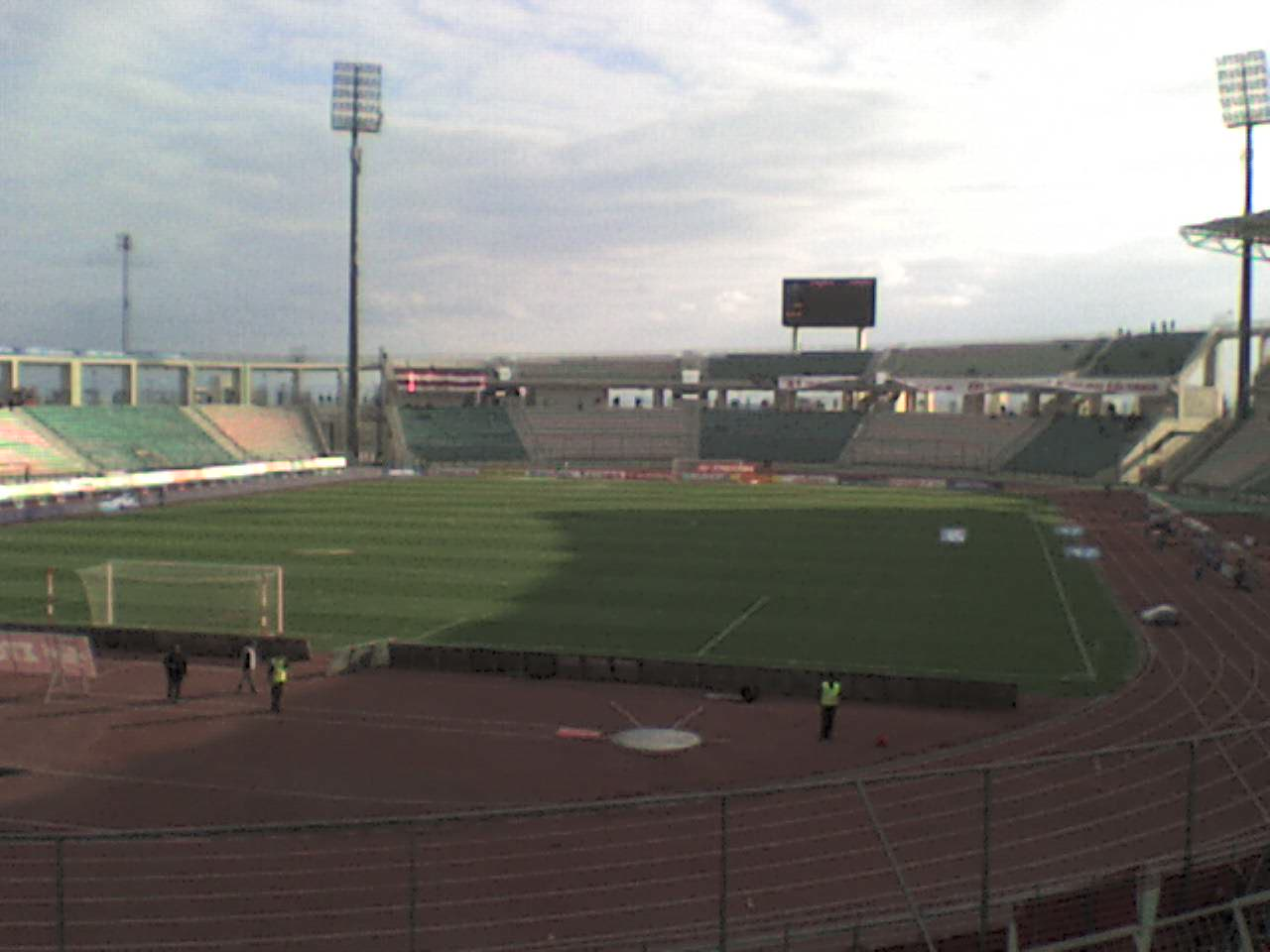
Panthessaliko Stadium.

This was the fifth Greek Cup final held at Panthessaliko Stadium after the 2007, 2017, 2020 and 2023 finals.

Panthessaliko Stadium was built in 2004. The stadium is used as a venue for Niki Volos and Volos. Its current capacity is 22,189.

== Background ==
Panathinaikos had reached the Greek Cup final thirty times, winning nineteen of them. The last time that they had played in a final was in 2022, where they had won PAOK by 1–0.

Aris had reached the Greek Cup final nine times, winning one of them. The last time that they had won the Cup was in 1970 (1–0 against PAOK). The last time that they had played in a final was in 2010, where they had lost to Panathinaikos by 1–0.

The two teams had met each other in a Cup final two times in the 1940 and 2010 finals.

== Route to the final ==
Panathinaikos				Round	Aris			
Opponent	Agg.	1st leg	2nd leg		Opponent	Agg.	1st leg	2nd leg
Olympiacos	1–1 (7–6 p)	1–1 (H)	0–0 (a.e.t.) (A)	Round of 16	AEK Athens	1–1 (4–2 p)	0–0 (A)	1–1 (a.e.t.) (H)
Atromitos	3–2	1–2 (H)	2–0 (A)	Quarter-finals	Niki Volos	5–2	3–0 (H)	2–2 (A)
PAOK	2–2 (6–5 p)	1–0 (A)	1–2 (a.e.t.) (H)	Semi-finals	Panetolikos	1–0	1–0 (A)	0–0 (H)

== Match ==
=== Details ===
25 May 2024
20:30 EEST

Panathinaikos	1–0	Aris
Vagiannidis 90+7'	Report

Panthessaliko Stadium, Volos
Attendance: Behind closed doors
Referee: Stéphanie Frappart (France)

Panathinaikos	Aris

GK	12	(Russia) Yuri Lodygin
RB	27	(Greece) Giannis Kotsiras	(yellow card) 36' (yellow-red card) 51'
CB	21	(Croatia) Tin Jedvaj
CB	55	(Brazil) Willian Arão
LB	3	(Spain) Juankar	(yellow card) 90+4'
DM	4	(Spain) Rubén Pérez
CM	16	(Slovenia) Adam Gnezda Čerin	(yellow card) 43'
CM	8	(Greece) Anastasios Bakasetas
RW	17	(Argentina) Daniel Mancini		(substituted off) 62'
LW	10	(Brazil) Bernard
CF	7	(Greece) Fotis Ioannidis (c)
Substitutes:
GK	69	(Poland) Bartłomiej Drągowski
DF	20	(Brazil) Vitor Hugo
DF	36	(Greece) Giorgos Katris
DF	2	(Greece) Georgios Vagiannidis		(substituted on) 62'
DF	25	(Serbia) Filip Mladenović
ΜF	60	(Greece) Georgios Kyriopoulos
MF	22	(Spain) Aitor Cantalapiedra
MF	31	(Serbia) Filip Đuričić
FW	29	(Sweden) Alexander Jeremejeff
Manager:
(Greece) Christos Kontis

GK	23	(Spain) Julián Cuesta (c)
RB	22	(England) Moses Odubajo
CB	4	(Brazil) Fabiano Leismann
CB	14	(Czech Republic) Jakub Brabec
LB	33	(Spain) Martín Montoya	(yellow card) 42'
DM	30	(Cameroon) Jean Jules	(red card) 71'
CM	16	(Czech Republic) Vladimír Darida	(yellow card) 15' (yellow-red card) 65'
RM	93	(Russia) Shapi Suleymanov	(red card) 90+9'
LM	12	(Costa Rica) Álvaro Zamora	(yellow card) 36'
AM	6	(Spain) Manu García		(substituted off) 68'
CF	80	(Spain) Loren Morón	(yellow card) 90+2'
Substitutes:
GK	94	(Greece) Lefteris Choutesiotis
DF	44	(Spain) Fran Vélez
DF	92	(Mauritius) Lindsay Rose
DF	3	(Argentina) Franco Ferrari
MF	28	(Belgium) Birger Verstraete		(substituted on) 68'
MF	19	(Greece) Giannis Fetfatzidis
MF	77	(Greece) Michalis Panagidis
FW	17	(Iran) Karim Ansarifard
FW	41	(Greece) Theodoros Agorastos
Manager:
(Greece) Akis Mantzios

Man of the Match:
Georgios Vagiannidis (Panathinaikos)

Assistant referees:
Mikael Berchebru (France)
Steven Torregrossa (France)
Fourth official:
Aristotelis Diamantopoulos (Arcadia)
Video assistant referee:
Hamid Guenaoui (France)
Assistant video assistant referee:
Konstantinos Psarris (Zakynthos)

Match rules

- 90 minutes
- 30 minutes of extra time if necessary
- Penalty shoot-out if scores still level
- Nine named substitutes, of which up to five may be used at maximum three times, with a sixth allowed in extra time.
