= 2023–24 Aris Thessaloniki F.C. season =

Aris Thessaloniki
- President: Irini Karipidis
- Manager: Apostolos Terzis (until 29 August 2023); Akis Mantzios
- Stadium: Kleanthis Vikelidis Stadium
- Super League 1: 5th
- Greek Cup: Finalist
- UEFA Europa Conference League: Third qualifying round
- Top goalscorer: League: Loren Morón (20); All: Loren Morón (21)
| Home colours | Away colours | Third colours |

The 2023–24 season was the 110th season in the existence of Aris Thessaloniki F.C. and the club's 6th consecutive season in the top flight of Greek football since their return there. In addition to the Super League 1, Aris are participating in this season's editions of the Greek Cup and for 5th consecutive time in a European competition and the UEFA Europa Conference League.

In the UEFA Europa Conference League, Aris Thessaloniki started in the Second qualifying round, where eliminated Armenian Ararat-Armenia with a home win and a draw. After that in the Third qualifying round and even though Aris won first leg's game in Thessaloniki, were eliminated by Ukrainian club Dynamo Kyiv in penalties.

In the Super League 1, Aris Thessaloniki kicked off the season with two away defeats from OFI and Lamia. In the first home game and after the managerial change, Aris won Asteras Tripolis with 3–2. The result of away game, on 17 September, in the Derby of Thessaloniki was 0-0. In Regular season with 12 wins and 6 draws Aris Thessaloniki finish in 5th place and entered in Championship Play-offs. In Championship Play-offs with 4 wins and 1 draw Aris Thessaloniki remained in 5th place and did not qualify in a European competition for next season.

In the Greek Cup Aris Thessaloniki entered in Round of 16. The Round of 16 draw took place on 20 October and Aris Thessaloniki were drawn to AEK Athens. Both games were played behind closed doors. The first leg's game in Athens has ended 0-0 and in the second leg's one in Thessaloniki the result was also draw (1-1). Aris Thessaloniki won in penalties with 4-2 and advanced to Quarter-finals where faced Niki Volos. With a win and a draw Aris Thessaloniki advanced to Semi-finals. In this phase, Aris Thessaloniki eliminated Panetolikos with a win and a draw. The Greek Cup final took place in Panthessaliko Stadium and behind closed doors. Aris Thessaloniki lost the title by Panathinaikos with a goal in additional time.

Apostolos Terzis, after the defeat from Lamia in second matchday, resigned and Akis Mantzios was hired as the new manager of Aris Thessaloniki until the end of the season.

== First-team squad ==
| # | Name | Nationality | Position(s) | Date of birth (age) | Signed from |
Goalkeepers
| 23 | Julián Cuesta (captain) | (Spain) | GK | March 28, 1991 (aged 33) | (Poland) Wisła Kraków |
| 94 | Lefteris Choutesiotis | (Greece) | GK | July 20, 1994 (aged 29) | (Greece) Ionikos |
| 31 | Konstantinos Kyriazis | (Greece) | GK | March 4, 2004 (aged 20) | Club's Academy |
Defenders
| 3 | Franco Ferrari | (Argentina) / (Italy) | LB / LM | May 9, 1992 (aged 32) | (Cyprus) APOEL |
| 4 | Fabiano Leismann | (Brazil) | CB / RB | November 18, 1991 (aged 32) | (Turkey) Denizlispor |
| 5 | Georgios Delizisis | (Greece) | CB | December 1, 1987 (aged 36) | Free Agent |
| 13 | Rónald Matarrita | (Costa Rica) | LB / LM | July 9, 1994 (aged 29) | (Ukraine) Dnipro-1 |
| 14 | Jakub Brabec (vice-captain) | (Czech Republic) | CB | August 6, 1992 (aged 31) | (Czech Republic) Viktoria Plzeň |
| 18 | Valentino Fattore | (Spain) / (Argentina) | RB / CB | August 10, 2001 (aged 22) | (Spain) Sevilla Atlético |
| 22 | Moses Odubajo | (England) / (Nigeria) | RB / RM / LB | June 2, 1996 (aged 27) | (England) Queens Park Rangers |
| 33 | Martín Montoya | (Spain) | RB / LB | April 14, 1991 (aged 33) | (Spain) Real Betis |
| 44 | Fran Vélez | (Spain) | CB / DM | June 23, 1991 (aged 32) | (Saudi Arabia) Al Fateh |
| 92 | Lindsay Rose | (Mauritius) / (France) | CB / RB | February 8, 1992 (aged 32) | (Poland) Legia Warsaw |
Midfielders
| 6 | Manu García | (Spain) | AM / CM | January 2, 1998 (aged 26) | (Spain) Sporting Gijón |
| 8 | Cheick Doukouré | (Ivory Coast) / (France) | DM / CM | September 11, 1992 (aged 31) | (Spain) Leganés |
| 10 | Lukas Rupp | (Germany) | CM / AM | January 8, 1991 (aged 33) | Free Agent |
| 16 | Vladimír Darida | (Czech Republic) | CM / AM / DM | August 8, 1990 (aged 33) | (Germany) Hertha BSC |
| 20 | Neven Đurasek | (Croatia) | DM / CM / AM | August 15, 1998 (aged 25) | (Ukraine) Shakhtar Donetsk |
| 21 | Rubén Pardo | (Spain) | CM / AM / DM | October 22, 1992 (aged 31) | (Spain) Leganés |
| 28 | Birger Verstraete | (Belgium) | DM / CM | April 16, 1994 (aged 30) | (Belgium) Royal Antwerp |
| 30 | Jean Jules | (Cameroon) | DM / CM | April 23, 1998 (aged 26) | (Poland) Górnik Zabrze |
Forwards
| 7 | Lazaros Christodoulopoulos | (Greece) | LW / SS / AM | December 19, 1986 (aged 37) | Free Agent |
| 9 | Jewison Bennette | (Costa Rica) | LW / RW / LM | June 15, 2004 (aged 19) | (England) Sunderland |
| 11 | Kike Saverio | (Ecuador) / (Spain) | LW / RW | June 19, 1999 (aged 24) | (Spain) Deportivo de La Coruña |
| 12 | Álvaro Zamora | (Costa Rica) | LW / RW / ST | March 9, 2002 (aged 22) | (Costa Rica) Saprissa |
| 17 | Karim Ansarifard | (Iran) | ST / SS | April 3, 1990 (aged 34) | (Cyprus) Omonia Nicosia |
| 19 | Giannis Fetfatzidis | (Greece) | LW / RW / AM | December 21, 1990 (aged 33) | (Cyprus) APOEL |
| 32 | David Moberg Karlsson | (Sweden) | RW / LW / ST | March 20, 1994 (aged 30) | (Japan) Urawa Red |
| 41 | Theodoros Agorastos | (Greece) | ST | November 30, 2005 (aged 18) | Club's Academy |
| 77 | Michalis Panagidis | (Greece) | LW / RW / AM | February 11, 2004 (aged 20) | Club's Academy |
| 80 | Loren Morón | (Spain) | ST | December 30, 1993 (aged 30) | (Spain) Real Betis |
| 93 | Shapi Suleymanov | (Russia) | RW / LW / ST | December 16, 1999 (aged 24) | (Russia) Krasnodar |

== Transfers and loans ==
=== Transfers in ===
| Entry date | Position | No. | Player | From club | Fee | Ref. |
|---|---|---|---|---|---|---|
| June 2023 | MF | 24 | (Croatia) Domagoj Pavičić | (Turkey) Konyaspor | Free | |
| June 2023 | GK | 94 | (Greece) Lefteris Choutesiotis | (Greece) Ionikos | Free | |
| June 2023 | DF | 13 | (Costa Rica) Rónald Matarrita | (Ukraine) Dnipro-1 | Free | |
| June 2023 | DF | 18 | (Spain) / (Argentina) Valentino Fattore | (Spain) Sevilla Atlético | Free | |
| June 2023 | DF | 25 | (Greece) / (Germany) Antonis Aidonis | (Germany) VfB Stuttgart | Free | |
| June 2023 | DF | 3 | (Argentina) / (Italy) Franco Ferrari | (Cyprus) APOEL | Free | |
| July 2023 | FW | 11 | (Ecuador) / (Spain) Kike Saverio | (Spain) Deportivo de La Coruña | Free | |
| July 2023 | MF | 20 | (Croatia) Neven Đurasek | (Ukraine) Shakhtar Donetsk | Free | |
| July 2023 | FW | 27 | (Argentina) Jonathan Menéndez | (United States) Real Salt Lake | Free | |
| July 2023 | MF | 30 | (Cameroon) Jean Jules | (Poland) Górnik Zabrze | Free | |
| July 2023 | FW | 12 | (Costa Rica) Álvaro Zamora | (Costa Rica) Saprissa | Free | |
| July 2023 | FW | 80 | (Spain) Loren Morón | (Spain) Real Betis | Free | |
| August 2023 | DF | 33 | (Spain) Martín Montoya | (Spain) Real Betis | Free | |
| August 2023 | MF | 21 | (Spain) Rubén Pardo | (Spain) Leganés | Free | |
| September 2023 | DF | 44 | (Spain) Fran Vélez | (Saudi Arabia) Al Fateh | Free | |
| September 2023 | MF | 28 | (Belgium) Birger Verstraete | (Belgium) Royal Antwerp | Free | |
| September 2023 | DF | 5 | (Greece) Georgios Delizisis | Free Agent | Free | |
| January 2024 | DF | 92 | (Mauritius) / (France) Lindsay Rose | (Poland) Legia Warsaw | Free | |
| January 2024 | FW | 19 | (Greece) Giannis Fetfatzidis | (Cyprus) APOEL | Free | |
| January 2024 | GK | - | (Ukraine) Maksym Koval | (Moldova) Sheriff Tiraspol | Free | |
| January 2024 | FW | 17 | (Iran) Karim Ansarifard | (Cyprus) Omonia Nicosia | Free | |

=== Transfers out ===
| Exit date | Position | No. | Player | To club | Fee | Ref. |
|---|---|---|---|---|---|---|
| June 2023 | DF | 18 | (Republic of the Congo) / (France) Bradley Mazikou | (Switzerland) Servette | €350.000 | |
| June 2023 | FW | 10 | (Argentina) / (Italy) Mateo García | (Mexico) Atlas | €1.000.000 | |
| June 2023 | DF | - | (Greece) Konstantinos Chrysopoulos | (Greece) AEK Athens | €800.000 | |
| June 2023 | FW | 11 | (Paraguay) / (Argentina) Juan Iturbe | Free Agent | Released | |
| June 2023 | FW | 27 | (Ivory Coast) Gervinho | Free Agent | Released | |
| June 2023 | FW | 20 | (Bosnia and Herzegovina) / (Switzerland) Izet Hajrović | Free Agent | Released | |
| June 2023 | DF | 3 | (Cameroon) Nicolas Nkoulou | Free Agent | Released | |
| June 2023 | GK | 99 | (Greece) Marios Siampanis | Free Agent | Released | |
| June 2023 | DF | 25 | (Greece) Christos Marmaridis | Free Agent | Released | |
| June 2023 | FW | 21 | (Greece) Christos Chatziioannou | (Greece) Panathinaikos B | Released | |
| June 2023 | GK | 70 | (Greece) Giorgos Karakasidis | (Greece) Panathinaikos B | Released | |
| June 2023 | DF | 50 | (Greece) Konstantinos Tanoulis | (Greece) Olympiacos B | Released | |
| June 2023 | MF | 88 | (Greece) Rafail Sgouros | (Greece) Olympiacos B | Released | |
| July 2023 | DF | 43 | (Belgium) / (Ghana) Marvin Peersman | (Netherlands) Groningen | Released | |
| August 2023 | MF | 6 | (Burkina Faso) / (France) Bryan Dabo | Free Agent | Released | |
| August 2023 | DF | 2 | (France) / (Democratic Republic of the Congo) Salem Mbakata | (Turkey) Gaziantep | €250.000 | |
| August 2023 | FW | 17 | (Honduras) Luis Palma | (Scotland) Celtic | €4.750.000 | |
| September 2023 | FW | 9 | (Jamaica) / (England) Andre Gray | Free Agent | Released | |
| September 2023 | DF | 25 | (Greece) / (Germany) Antonis Aidonis | Free Agent | Released | |
| January 2024 | FW | 27 | (Argentina) Jonathan Menéndez | Free Agent | Released | |

=== Loans in ===
| Start date | End date | Position | No. | Player | From club | Fee | Ref. |
|---|---|---|---|---|---|---|---|
| July 2023 | June 2024 | FW | 32 | (Sweden) David Moberg Karlsson | (Japan) Urawa Red | None | |
| September 2023 | June 2024 | FW | 93 | (Russia) Shapi Suleymanov | (Russia) Krasnodar | €100.000 | |
| January 2024 | June 2024 | FW | 9 | (Costa Rica) Jewison Bennette | (England) Sunderland | None | |

=== Loans out ===
| Start date | End date | Position | No. | Player | To club | Fee | Ref. |
|---|---|---|---|---|---|---|---|
| January 2024 | June 2024 | GK | - | (Ukraine) Maksym Koval | (Greece) Kalamata | None | |
| January 2024 | June 2024 | MF | 24 | (Croatia) Domagoj Pavičić | (Romania) Dinamo București | None | |

=== Transfer summary ===
Spending

Summer: ▼€100.000

Winter: €0

Total: ▼€100.000

Income

Summer: ▲€7.150.000

Winter: €0

Total: ▲€7.150.000

Net Expenditure

Summer: ▲€7.050.000

Winter: €0

Total: ▲€7.050.000

== Pre-season friendlies ==
| 21 June 2023 Friendly | Maccabi Haifa | 0 – 1 | Aris Thessaloniki | Nof HaGalil |
| 21:00 | | (in Greek) | Lazaros Christodoulopoulos 80' (pen.) | Stadium: Green Stadium |

| 24 June 2023 Friendly | Maccabi Haifa | 4 – 1 | Aris Thessaloniki | Nof HaGalil |
| 20:00 | Maor Kandil 6'; Hamza Shibli 43'; Bassam Zarora 74'; Mavis Tchibota 77' | (in Greek) | Luis Palma 85' | Stadium: Green Stadium |

| 2 July 2023 Friendly | Botev Plovdiv | 1 – 0 | Aris Thessaloniki | Plovdiv |
| 20:00 | Martin Sekulić 17' | (in Greek) | | Stadium: Stadion Hristo Botev |

| 9 July 2023 Friendly | Aris Thessaloniki | 0 – 2 | CSKA 1948 | Thessaloniki |
| 18:30 | | (in Greek) | Stoyan Stoichkov 48'; Georgi Rusev 59' | Stadium: Makedonikos Stadium |

| 20 July 2023 Friendly | Aris Thessaloniki | 3 – 1 | Ethnikos Achnas | Thessaloniki |
| 21:15 | Lukas Rupp 13'; Andre Gray 45+2'; Vladimír Darida 50' | (in Greek) | Marios Elia 53' | Stadium: Kleanthis Vikelidis Stadium |

== Competitions ==
=== Overall ===
| Competition | Started round | Current position / round | Final position / round | First match | Last match |
|---|---|---|---|---|---|
| Super League 1 | Matchday 1 | — | 5th | 20 August 2023 | 19 May 2024 |
| Regular Season | Matchday 1 | — | 5th | 20 August 2023 | 3 March 2024 |
| Play-off Round | Matchday 1 | — | 5th | 10 March 2024 | 19 May 2024 |
| Greek Cup | Round of 16 | — | Final | 10 January 2024 | 25 May 2024 |
| UECL | Second qualifying round | — | Third qualifying round | 27 July 2023 | 17 August 2023 |

Updated to match played 25 May 2024
Source: Competitions

=== Overview ===
| Competition | Record | | | | | | | |
| Competition | G | W | D | L | GF | GA | GD | Win % |
|---|---|---|---|---|---|---|---|---|
| Super League 1 | 36 | 16 | 7 | 13 | 51 | 44 | +7 | 44.44 |
| Greek Cup | 7 | 2 | 4 | 1 | 7 | 4 | +3 | 28.57 |
| UECL | 4 | 2 | 1 | 1 | 4 | 3 | +1 | 50.00 |
| Total | 47 | 20 | 12 | 15 | 62 | 51 | +11 | 42.55 |

Updated to match played 25 May 2024
Source: Competitions

| Super League 1 | Record | | | | | | | |
| Super League 1 | G | W | D | L | GF | GA | GD | Win % |
|---|---|---|---|---|---|---|---|---|
| Regular Season | 26 | 12 | 6 | 8 | 39 | 29 | +10 | 46.15 |
| Play-off Round | 10 | 4 | 1 | 5 | 12 | 15 | −3 | 40.00 |
| Total | 36 | 16 | 7 | 13 | 51 | 44 | +7 | 44.44 |

Updated to match played 19 May 2024
Source: Competitions

==== Managers' Overview ====
===== Apostolos Terzis =====
| Competition | Record | | | | | | | |
| Competition | G | W | D | L | GF | GA | GD | Win % |
|---|---|---|---|---|---|---|---|---|
| Super League 1 | 2 | 0 | 0 | 2 | 2 | 4 | −2 | 0.00 |
| Greek Cup | 0 | 0 | 0 | 0 | 0 | 0 | +0 | — |
| UECL | 4 | 2 | 1 | 1 | 4 | 3 | +1 | 50.00 |
| Total | 6 | 2 | 1 | 3 | 6 | 7 | −1 | 33.33 |

Updated to match played 27 August 2023
Source: Competitions

===== Akis Mantzios =====
| Competition | Record | | | | | | | |
| Competition | G | W | D | L | GF | GA | GD | Win % |
|---|---|---|---|---|---|---|---|---|
| Super League 1 | 34 | 16 | 7 | 11 | 49 | 40 | +9 | 47.06 |
| Greek Cup | 7 | 2 | 4 | 1 | 7 | 4 | +3 | 28.57 |
| UECL | 0 | 0 | 0 | 0 | 0 | 0 | +0 | — |
| Total | 41 | 18 | 11 | 12 | 56 | 44 | +12 | 43.90 |

Updated to match played 25 May 2024
Source: Competitions

=== Super League Greece ===
==== Regular season ====
===== League table =====
| Pos | Team | Pld | W | D | L | GF | GA | GD | Pts | Qualification or relegation |
|---|---|---|---|---|---|---|---|---|---|---|
| 3 | Olympiacos | 26 | 18 | 3 | 5 | 58 | 24 | +34 | 57 | Qualification for the Play-off round |
| 4 | Panathinaikos | 26 | 17 | 5 | 4 | 62 | 21 | +41 | 56 | Qualification for the Play-off round |
| 5 | Aris | 26 | 12 | 6 | 8 | 39 | 29 | +10 | 42 | Qualification for the Play-off round |
| 6 | Lamia | 26 | 9 | 7 | 10 | 35 | 44 | −9 | 34 | Qualification for the Play-off round |
| 7 | Asteras Tripolis | 26 | 9 | 4 | 13 | 36 | 46 | −10 | 31 | Qualification for the Play-out round |

Source: Super League Greece
Rules for classification: 1) Points; 2) Head-to-head points; 3) Head-to-head goal difference; 4) Goal difference; 5) Goals scored; 6) Play-offs (neutral ground).
(Note: Criterion 6 is only used if needed to decide champion, teams for relegation or teams for UEFA competitions).

===== Results summary =====
| Overall | | | | | | | | Home | | | | | | Away | | | | | |
| Pld | W | D | L | GF | GA | GD | Pts | W | D | L | GF | GA | GD | W | D | L | GF | GA | GD |
|---|---|---|---|---|---|---|---|---|---|---|---|---|---|---|---|---|---|---|---|
| 26 | 12 | 6 | 8 | 39 | 29 | +10 | 42 | 8 | 3 | 2 | 24 | 14 | +10 | 4 | 3 | 6 | 15 | 15 | 0 |

Last updated: 3 March 2024.
Source: Super League Greece

===== Results by matchday =====
| Matchday | 1 | 2 | 3 | 4 | 5 | 6 | 7 | 8 | 9 | 10 | 11 | 12 | 13 | 14 | 15 | 16 | 17 | 18 | 19 | 20 | 21 | 22 | 23 | 24 | 25 | 26 |
|---|---|---|---|---|---|---|---|---|---|---|---|---|---|---|---|---|---|---|---|---|---|---|---|---|---|---|
| Ground | A | A | H | A | H | A | H | H | H | H | A | H | A | H | H | A | H | A | H | A | A | A | A | H | A | H |
| Result | L | L | W | D | W | L | D | W | W | L | W | W | L | W | D | L | W | W | L | W | D | D | W | W | L | D |
| Position | 11 | 12 | 8 | 9 | 5 | 7 | 8 | 7 | 6 | 6 | 5 | 5 | 5 | 5 | 5 | 5 | 5 | 5 | 5 | 5 | 5 | 5 | 5 | 5 | 5 | 5 |

Updated to match(es) played on 3 March 2024. Source: Super League Greece
A = Away; H = Home; W = Win; D = Draw; L = Loss; P = Postponed

===== Matches =====
| 20 August 2023 1 | OFI | 3 – 2 | Aris Thessaloniki | Heraklion |
| 19:30 EET | Nouha Dicko 17'; Andreas Karo (yellow card) 31'; Guðmundur Þórarinsson 38'; Felipe Gallegos (yellow card) 48'; Eric Larsson (yellow card) 79'; Triantafyllos Pasalidis (yellow card) 85'; Juan Neira 90+1'; Leroy Abanda (yellow card) 90+8' | Report | Franco Ferrari (yellow card) 37'; Loren Morón 40'; Fabiano Leismann (yellow card) 60', (goal) 68'; Vladimír Darida (yellow card) 69' | Stadium: Theodoros Vardinogiannis Stadium; Attendance: 4.721; Referee: Evangelos Manouhos |

| 27 August 2023 2 | Lamia | 1 – 0 | Aris Thessaloniki | Lamia |
| 19:30 EET | Cristopher Núñez (yellow card) 25'; Carlitos 38'; Samuele Longo (yellow card) 84'; David Simón (yellow card) 90' (yellow-red card) 90+3' | Report | Franco Ferrari (yellow card) 51'; Loren Morón (yellow card) 74'; David Moberg Karlsson (yellow card) 87'; Lefteris Choutesiotis (yellow card) 90+3' | Stadium: Lamia Municipal Stadium; Attendance: 2.141; Referee: Christos Vergetis |

| 3 September 2023 3 | Aris Thessaloniki | 3 – 2 | Asteras Tripolis | Thessaloniki |
| 20:00 EET | Álvaro Zamora 16'; Loren Morón 61'; Fabiano Leismann 82' (pen.); Julián Cuesta (yellow card) 90+4' | Report | Julián Bartolo 28'; Pepe Castaño (yellow card) 45+6'; Nikos Papadopoulos (yellow card) 80'; Nikos Kaltsas (yellow card) 83'; Vasilios Mantzis 85' | Stadium: Kleanthis Vikelidis Stadium; Attendance: 5.805; Referee: Athanassios Tzilos |

| 17 September 2023 4 | PAOK | 0 – 0 | Aris Thessaloniki | Thessaloniki |
| 20:30 EET | Vieirinha (yellow card) 36'; Konstantinos Koulierakis (yellow card) 67'; Tomasz Kędziora (yellow card) 90+3'; Thomas Murg (yellow card) 90+7' | Report | Cheick Doukouré (yellow card) 22'; Martín Montoya (yellow card) 28'; Julián Cuesta (yellow card) 87' | Stadium: Toumba Stadium; Attendance: 17.731; Referee: Anastasios Papapetrou |

| 24 September 2023 5 | Aris Thessaloniki | 3 – 0 | Panetolikos | Thessaloniki |
| 17:30 EET | Loren Morón 22', 55'; Lazaros Christodoulopoulos 85' | Report | Facundo Pérez (yellow card) 53'; Marios Oikonomou (yellow card) 85' | Stadium: Kleanthis Vikelidis Stadium; Attendance: 6.129; Referee: Aristotelis Diamantopoulos |

| 27 September 2023 6 | Olympiacos | 4 – 1 | Aris Thessaloniki | Piraeus |
| 20:30 EET | Jakub Brabec 21' (o.g.); Quini (yellow card) 44'; Mady Camara (yellow card) 60'; Ayoub El Kaabi 62', 70'; Stevan Jovetić 84' | Report | Rubén Pardo 47' | Stadium: Karaiskakis Stadium; Attendance: 20.653; Referee: Mohammed Al-Hakim (Sweden) |

| 1 October 2023 7 | Aris Thessaloniki | 1 – 1 | A.E. Kifisia | Thessaloniki |
| 17:30 EET | Loren Morón 23'; Fabiano Leismann (yellow card) 86'; Álvaro Zamora (yellow card) 90+4' | Report | Nicolás Andereggen (yellow card) 31'; Antonis Papasavvas (yellow card) 49'; Alberto Botía (yellow card) 54'; Nikos Vafeas (yellow card) 62'; Ognjen Ožegović 75'; Alexandros Anagnostopoulos (yellow card) 76'; Marko Gobeljić (yellow card) 86'; Georgios Konstantakopoulos (yellow card) 89' | Stadium: Kleanthis Vikelidis Stadium; Attendance: 5.581; Referee: Konstantinos Poulikidis |

| 21 October 2023 8 | Aris Thessaloniki | 1 – 0 | Panserraikos | Thessaloniki |
| 20:00 EET | Rubén Pardo (yellow card) 10'; Birger Verstraete (yellow card) 57'; Michalis Panagidis (yellow card) 90+3'; Fabiano Leismann 90+7' | Report | Maximiliano Moreira (yellow card) 11'; Stavros Petavrakis (yellow card) 16'; Panagiotis Deligiannidis (yellow card) 35'; Paschalis Staikos (yellow card) 45'; Emil Bergström (yellow card) 60'; Adrián Chovan (yellow card) 90+1' | Stadium: Kleanthis Vikelidis Stadium; Attendance: 4.719; Referee: Konstantinos Perakis |

| 29 October 2023 9 | Aris Thessaloniki | 2 – 0 | PAS Giannina | Thessaloniki |
| 20:30 EET | Fabiano Leismann (yellow card) 15'; Shapi Suleymanov (yellow card) 45+2', (goal) 55'; Loren Morón (yellow card) 72'; Álvaro Zamora 75'; Birger Verstraete (yellow card) 80' | Report | Federico Gino (yellow card) 45+2' (yellow-red card) 61' | Stadium: Kleanthis Vikelidis Stadium; Attendance: 5.917; Referee: Evangelos Manouhos |

| 5 November 2023 10 | Aris Thessaloniki | 1 – 3 | Atromitos | Thessaloniki |
| 20:15 EET | Fabiano Leismann 39'; Birger Verstraete (yellow card) 53'; Vladimír Darida (yellow card) 67'; Jakub Brabec (yellow card) 86' | Report | Diego Valencia (yellow card) 9', (goal) 55' (pen.); Samúel Friðjónsson 25'; Maksym Imerekov (yellow card) 31'; Dimitrios Tsakmakis (yellow card) 61'; Aguibou Camara 77'; Karol Angielski (yellow card) 86' | Stadium: Kleanthis Vikelidis Stadium; Attendance: 5.423; Referee: Aristotelis Diamantopoulos |

| 11 November 2023 11 | Volos NFC | 0 – 2 | Aris Thessaloniki | Volos |
| 20:00 EET | Alexis Trouillet (yellow card) 18'; Nemanja Glavčić (yellow card) 18'; Tasos Tsokanis (yellow card) 45+1'; Alexis Kalogeropoulos (yellow card) 59' | Report | Franco Ferrari (yellow card) 40'; Loren Morón 60' (pen.); Vladimír Darida 75'; David Moberg Karlsson (yellow card) 87' | Stadium: Panthessaliko Stadium; Attendance: 137; Referee: Stavros Tsimenteridis |

| 26 November 2023 12 | Aris Thessaloniki | 2 – 0 | Panathinaikos | Thessaloniki |
| 20:30 EEST | Loren Morón 43'; Michalis Panagidis (yellow card) 61'; Jakub Brabec (yellow card) 65'; Jonathan Menéndez 72', (yellow card) 85' | Report | Willian Arão (yellow card) 77' | Stadium: Kleanthis Vikelidis Stadium; Attendance: 7.313; Referee: Gustavo Correia (Portugal) |

| 4 December 2023 13 | AEK Athens | 1 – 0 | Aris Thessaloniki | Athens |
| 21:00 EEST | Domagoj Vida (yellow card) 43', (goal) 59' | Report | Vladimír Darida (yellow card) 24' | Stadium: Agia Sophia Stadium; Attendance: 26.810; Referee: Mohammed Al-Hakim (Sweden) |

| 17 December 2023 14 | Aris Thessaloniki | 1 – 0 | OFI | Thessaloniki |
| 15:00 EET | Vladimír Darida 39'; Birger Verstraete (yellow card) 90' | Report | Jon Toral (yellow card) 49' | Stadium: Kleanthis Vikelidis Stadium; Referee: Andreas Gamaris |

| 20 December 2023 15 | Aris Thessaloniki | 2 – 2 | Lamia | Thessaloniki |
| 17:00 EET | Loren Morón 48' (pen.), 74'; Martín Montoya (yellow card) 89' | Report | Theofanis Tzandaris (yellow card) 28'; David Simón (yellow card) 45+1'; Mathías Acuña 56', (yellow card) 59'; Flosard Malçi 90+5'; Kyriakos Papadopoulos (yellow card) 90+7' | Stadium: Kleanthis Vikelidis Stadium; Referee: Aristidis Vatsios |

| 3 January 2024 16 | Asteras Tripolis | 3 – 2 | Aris Thessaloniki | Tripoli |
| 15:00 EET | Juan Miritello 45+2' (pen.), 52', (yellow card) 55'; Juan Munafo 61' | Report | Loren Morón 7' (pen.), (yellow card) 90+8'; Magomed-Shapi Suleymanov 14'; Moses Odubajo (yellow card) 90+6'; Jakub Brabec (yellow card) 90+9' | Stadium: Theodoros Kolokotronis Stadium; Referee: Angelos Evangelou |

| 7 January 2024 17 | Aris Thessaloniki | 2 – 1 | PAOK | Thessaloniki |
| 20:00 EET | Magomed-Shapi Suleymanov 46'; Kike Saverio 59'; Jean Jules (yellow card) 88'; Vladimír Darida (yellow card) 90' | Report | Baba Rahman (yellow card) 6', (goal) 75'; Soualiho Meïté (yellow card) 48'; Magomed Ozdoyev (yellow card) 64'; Taison (yellow card) 88' | Stadium: Kleanthis Vikelidis Stadium; Referee: Sandi Putros (Denmark) |

| 14 January 2024 18 | Panetolikos | 0 – 4 | Aris Thessaloniki | Agrinio |
| 15:00 EET | Bruno Duarte (yellow card) 7'; João Pedro (yellow card) 71'; Alexandros Malis (yellow card) 90+3' | Report | Cheick Doukouré (yellow card) 13'; Neven Đurasek 19'; Magomed-Shapi Suleymanov 78'; Kike Saverio 90'; Álvaro Zamora 90+6' | Stadium: Panetolikos Stadium; Referee: Stavros Tsimenteridis |

| 21 January 2024 19 | Aris Thessaloniki | 1 – 2 | Olympiacos | Thessaloniki |
| 20:00 EET | Fabiano Leismann (yellow card) 19'; Lindsay Rose (yellow card) 37'; Quini 90+1' (o.g.) | Report | Fran Navarro 17'; Rodinei 21' (pen.), (yellow card) 90+3'; Sotiris Alexandropoulos (yellow card) 78' | Stadium: Kleanthis Vikelidis Stadium; Referee: Morten Krogh (Denmark) |

| 27 January 2024 20 | A.E. Kifisia | 0 – 1 | Aris Thessaloniki | Athens |
| 20:00 EET | Luka Capan (yellow card) 30'; André Teixeira (yellow card) 54'; Facundo Soloa (yellow card) 60'; Nikos Peios (yellow card) 65' | Report | Giannis Fetfatzidis 16'; Lindsay Rose (yellow card) 21'; Álvaro Zamora (yellow card) 30'; Moses Odubajo (yellow card) 64'; Kike Saverio (yellow card) 69'; Vladimír Darida (yellow card) 80'; Lefteris Choutesiotis (yellow card) 90+7' | Stadium: Michalis Kritikopoulos Stadium; Referee: Andreas Gamaris |

| 3 February 2024 21 | Panserraikos | 1 – 1 | Aris Thessaloniki | Serres |
| 19:30 EET | Konstantinos Thymianis (yellow card) 35'; Paschalis Staikos (yellow card) 37'; Ismahila Ouédraogo (yellow card) 49'; Panagiotis Deligiannidis (yellow card) 56'; Kosta Aleksić 90+5', (yellow card) 90+6' | Report | Moses Odubajo (yellow card) 33'; Loren Morón 52'; Martín Montoya (yellow card) 72' | Stadium: Serres Municipal Stadium; Referee: Athanassios Tzilos |

| 10 February 2024 22 | PAS Giannina | 0 – 0 | Aris Thessaloniki | Ioannina |
| 19:00 EET | Federico Gino (yellow card) 67'; Rodrigo Erramuspe (yellow card) 69'; Angelos Liasos (yellow card) 71'; Gergely Nagy (yellow card) 88' | Report | Álvaro Zamora (yellow card) 40'; Kike Saverio (yellow card) 67' | Stadium: Zosimades Stadium; Referee: Aristidis Vatsios |

| 17 February 2024 23 | Atromitos | 0 – 2 | Aris Thessaloniki | Peristeri |
| 19:30 EET | Aguibou Camara (yellow card) 24'; Wajdi Kechrida (yellow card) 27'; Dimitrios Tsakmakis (yellow card) 64'; Gaëtan Robail (yellow card) 72' | Report | Fran Vélez (yellow card) 24'; Loren Morón 33' (pen.); Manu García (yellow card) 41'; Kike Saverio (yellow card) 54'; Vladimír Darida (yellow card) 90+1', (goal) 90+4' | Stadium: Peristeri Stadium; Attendance: 1.354; Referee: Konstantinos Tsetsilas |

| 25 February 2024 24 | Aris Thessaloniki | 2 – 0 | Volos NFC | Thessaloniki |
| 19:30 EET | Loren Morón 45+1'; Neven Đurasek (yellow card) 76'; Karim Ansarifard (yellow card) 84', (goal) 88' | Report | Joeri de Kamps (yellow card) 10'; Juan Manuel García (yellow card) 11'; Maximiliano Comba (yellow card) 31'; Tasos Tsokanis (yellow card) 77'; Alexis Kalogeropoulos (yellow card) 90+1'; Jean Barrientos (yellow card) 90+3' | Stadium: Kleanthis Vikelidis Stadium; Attendance: 3.765; Referee: Andreas Gamaris |

| 28 February 2024 25 | Panathinaikos | 2 – 0 | Aris Thessaloniki | Athens |
| 21:00 EET | Anastasios Bakasetas 4'; Filip Mladenović (yellow card) 24'; Willian Arão (yellow card) 84' | Report | Moses Odubajo (yellow card) 55' | Stadium: Leoforos Alexandras Stadium; Attendance: 8.323; Referee: Mohammed Al-Hakim (Sweden) |

| 3 March 2024 26 | Aris Thessaloniki | 3 – 3 | AEK Athens | Thessaloniki |
| 19:30 EET | Martín Montoya (yellow card) 13'; Jean Jules (yellow card) 15'; Giannis Fetfatzidis 43'; Kike Saverio 49'; Fran Vélez (yellow card) 70'; Loren Morón 90+7' (pen.) | Report | Nordin Amrabat 15' (pen.); Robert Ljubičić (yellow card) 26'; Domagoj Vida 55'; Ezequiel Ponce 67'; Steven Zuber (yellow card) 72'; Damian Szymański (yellow card) 90+1' | Stadium: Kleanthis Vikelidis Stadium; Attendance: 7.445; Referee: Anastasios Sidiropoulos |

==== Championship Play-offs ====
===== League table =====
| Pos | Team | Pld | W | D | L | GF | GA | GD | Pts | Qualification |
|---|---|---|---|---|---|---|---|---|---|---|
| 1 | PAOK (C) | 36 | 25 | 5 | 6 | 87 | 34 | +53 | 80 | Qualification for the UCL second qualifying round |
| 2 | AEK Athens | 36 | 23 | 9 | 4 | 80 | 35 | +45 | 78 | Qualification for the UECL second qualifying round |
| 3 | Olympiacos | 36 | 23 | 5 | 8 | 78 | 36 | +42 | 74 | Qualification for the EL League phase |
| 4 | Panathinaikos | 36 | 22 | 6 | 8 | 82 | 37 | +45 | 72 | Qualification for the EL second qualifying round |
| 5 | Aris Thessaloniki | 36 | 16 | 7 | 13 | 51 | 44 | +7 | 55 | |
| 6 | Lamia | 36 | 9 | 8 | 19 | 43 | 79 | −36 | 35 | |

Updated to match(es) played on 19 May 2024. Source: Super League Greece
(C) Champions

===== Results summary =====
| Overall | | | | | | | | Home | | | | | | Away | | | | | |
| Pld | W | D | L | GF | GA | GD | Pts | W | D | L | GF | GA | GD | W | D | L | GF | GA | GD |
|---|---|---|---|---|---|---|---|---|---|---|---|---|---|---|---|---|---|---|---|
| 36 | 16 | 7 | 13 | 51 | 44 | +7 | 55 | 9 | 4 | 5 | 30 | 22 | +8 | 7 | 3 | 8 | 21 | 22 | −1 |

Last updated: 19 May 2024.
Source: Super League

===== Results by matchday =====
| Matchday | 1 | 2 | 3 | 4 | 5 | 6 | 7 | 8 | 9 | 10 |
|---|---|---|---|---|---|---|---|---|---|---|
| Ground | A | H | A | H | A | H | H | A | A | H |
| Result | W | W | L | L | L | L | D | W | W | L |
| Position | 5 | 5 | 5 | 5 | 5 | 5 | 5 | 5 | 5 | 5 |

Updated to match(es) played on 15 May 2024. Source: Super League
A = Away; H = Home; W = Win; D = Draw; L = Loss; P = Postponed

===== Matches =====
| 10 March 2024 1 | PAOK | 0 – 1 | Aris Thessaloniki | Thessaloniki |
| 21:00 EET | Stefan Schwab (yellow card) 60'; Andrija Živković (yellow card) 75' | Report | Loren Morón 31'; Karim Ansarifard (yellow card) 66'; Birger Verstraete (yellow card) 90+5'; Franco Ferrari (yellow card) 90+6' | Stadium: Toumba Stadium; Attendance: Slovenia; Referee: Rade Obrenovic (Slovenia) |

| 31 March 2024 2 | Aris Thessaloniki | 3 – 1 | Lamia | Thessaloniki |
| 20:30 EEST | Karim Ansarifard (yellow card) 32'; Jean Jules (yellow card) 38'; Shapi Suleymanov 55'; Manu García 56'; Jakub Brabec 59'; Fabiano Leismann (yellow card) 68' | Report | Caleb Stanko (yellow card) 8'; Rubén Martínez (yellow card) 22'; David Simón (yellow card) 43'; Vasilios Kontonikos 89' | Stadium: Kleanthis Vikelidis Stadium; Attendance: 3.885; Referee: Konstantinos Perakis |

| 3 April 2024 3 | Olympiacos | 3 – 0 | Aris Thessaloniki | Piraeus |
| 19:00 EET | Ayoub El Kaabi 6'; Santiago Hezze (yellow card) 57'; Daniel Podence 60', (yellow card) 71'; João Carvalho 89' | Report | Jakub Brabec (yellow card) 39'; Jean Jules (yellow card) 44' | Stadium: Karaiskakis Stadium; Attendance: 17.526; Referee: Eric Wattellier (France) |

| 7 April 2024 4 | Aris Thessaloniki | 0 – 2 | Panathinaikos | Thessaloniki |
| 19:30 EEST | Loren Morón (yellow card) 45+1'; Moses Odubajo (yellow card) 80' | Report | Georgios Vagiannidis (yellow card) 21'; Tin Jedvaj (yellow card) 38'; Adam Gnezda Čerin (yellow card) 59'; Andraž Šporar 62'; Jakub Brabec 90+2' (o.g.) | Stadium: Kleanthis Vikelidis Stadium; Attendance: 7.503; Referee: Aleksandar Stavrev (North Macedonia) |

| 14 April 2024 5 | AEK Athens | 2 – 0 | Aris Thessaloniki | Athens |
| 20:30 EET | Ezequiel Ponce 9', 14'; Alexander Callens (yellow card) 34'; Mijat Gaćinović (yellow card) 60' | Report | Birger Verstraete (yellow card) 6'; Kike Saverio (yellow card) 20'; Jakub Brabec (yellow card) 49'; Valentino Fattore (yellow card) 73'; Moses Odubajo (yellow card) 86' | Stadium: Agia Sophia Stadium; Attendance: 27.313; Referee: Evangelos Manouhos |

| 21 April 2024 6 | Aris Thessaloniki | 1 – 2 | AEK Athens | Thessaloniki |
| 19:30 EEST | Valentino Fattore (yellow card) 6'; Birger Verstraete (yellow card) 24'; Loren Morón 38'; Martín Montoya (yellow card) 40'; Lindsay Rose (yellow card) 51'; Álvaro Zamora (yellow card) 67'; Karim Ansarifard (yellow card) 82' | Report | Damian Szymański (yellow card) 35'; Djibril Sidibé 49'; Nordin Amrabat (yellow card) 75', (goal) 84' | Stadium: Kleanthis Vikelidis Stadium; Attendance: 3.793; Referee: Christos Vergetis |

| 24 April 2024 7 | Aris Thessaloniki | 1 – 1 | Olympiacos | Thessaloniki |
| 19:30 EET | Loren Morón 48'; Álvaro Zamora (yellow card) 82' | Report | Gelson Martins (yellow card) 11', (goal) 53' | Stadium: Kleanthis Vikelidis Stadium; Attendance: 3.533; Referee: Rade Obrenovic (Slovenia) |

| 28 April 2024 8 | Panathinaikos | 0 – 1 | Aris Thessaloniki | Athens |
| 20:00 EET | Willian Arão (yellow card) 63'; Daniel Mancini (yellow card) 76'; Filip Mladenović (yellow card) 88'; Filip Đuričić (yellow card) 89'; Anastasios Bakasetas (yellow card) 90+2' | Report | Álvaro Zamora 2'; Jean Jules (yellow card) 47'; Fabiano Leismann (yellow card) 52'; Jakub Brabec (yellow card) 57'; Cheick Doukouré (yellow card) 73'; Julián Cuesta (yellow card) 90+4'; Martín Montoya (yellow card) 90+6' | Stadium: Leoforos Alexandras Stadium; Attendance: 8.609; Referee: Aliyar Aghayev (Azerbaijan) |

| 15 May 2024 9 | Lamia | 2 – 4 | Aris Thessaloniki | Lamia |
| 18:00 EET | Rubén Martínez (yellow card) 16'; Sidcley (yellow card) 17'; Adam Tzanetopoulos 35'; Flosard Malçi 44'; Caleb Stanko (yellow card) 66' | Report | Franco Ferrari (yellow card) 11'; Shapi Suleymanov (yellow card) 17'; Loren Morón 46', 76'; Manu García (yellow card) 68'; Lindsay Rose (yellow card) 72'; Valentino Fattore 78'; Giannis Fetfatzidis 89' | Stadium: Lamia Municipal Stadium; Attendance: 981; Referee: Anastasios Sidiropoulos |

| 19 May 2024 10 | Aris Thessaloniki | 1 - 2 | PAOK | Thessaloniki |
| 20:00 EEST | Martín Montoya (yellow card) 39'; Loren Morón 47'; Birger Verstraete (yellow card) 55'; Manu García (yellow card) 88'; Álvaro Zamora (yellow card) 90+3' | Report | Giannis Michailidis (yellow card) 1' (yellow-red card) 78'; Brandon Thomas 30'; Taison 62'; Tomasz Kędziora (yellow card) 70'; Giannis Konstantelias (yellow card) 77' | Stadium: Kleanthis Vikelidis Stadium; Attendance: 18.644; Referee: Orel Grinfeld (Israel) |

=== Greek Cup ===
Aris Thessaloniki entered in Round of 16. The Round of 16 draw took place took place on 20 October 2023 and Aris Thessaloniki were drawn to AEK Athens.

Each tie in the knockout phase, apart from the final, was played over two legs. The away goals rule was not applied.

==== Round of 16 ====
| 10 January 2024 First leg | AEK Athens | 0 – 0 | Aris Thessaloniki | Athens |
| 19:30 EET | | Report | Magomed-Shapi Suleymanov (yellow card) 32' | Stadium: Agia Sophia Stadium; Referee: Matej Jug (Slovenia) |

| 17 January 2024 Second leg | Aris Thessaloniki | 1 – 1 (a.e.t.) (1–1 (4–2 p) agg.) | AEK Athens | Thessaloniki |
| 19:00 EET | Fabiano Leismann (yellow card) 57'; Loren Morón 58'; Moses Odubajo (yellow card) 71' | Report | Djibril Sidibé (yellow card) 8'; Mijat Gaćinović 45+1'; Lazaros Rota (yellow card) 56'; Stavros Pilios (yellow card) 65'; Petros Mantalos (yellow card) 79'; Rodolfo Pizarro (yellow card) 90+5'; Georgios Athanasiadis (yellow card) 113'; Gerasimos Mitoglou (yellow card) 119' | Stadium: Kleanthis Vikelidis Stadium; Referee: Nikola Dabanović (Montenegro) |
| | Penalties |
| | Domagoj Vida (penalty missed); Tom van Weert (penalty scored); Ezequiel Ponce (penalty missed); Orbelín Pineda (penalty scored) | | (penalty scored) Fabiano Leismann; (penalty scored) Loren Morón; (penalty missed) Giannis Fetfatzidis; (penalty scored) Vladimír Darida; (penalty scored) Birger Verstraete |

==== Quarter-finals ====
Aris Thessaloniki faced Niki Volos in Quarter-finals of Greek Cup. The draw took place on 20 October 2023.

| 24 January 2024 First leg | Aris Thessaloniki | 3 – 0 | Niki Volos | Thessaloniki |
| 18:00 EET | Vladimír Darida 58', 90+3'; Cheick Doukouré (yellow card) 45'; Moses Odubajo (yellow card) 89'; Birger Verstraete (yellow card) 90'; Magomed-Shapi Suleymanov 90+6' | Report | Pavlos Kyriakidis (yellow card) 17'; Lampros Politis (yellow card) 84'; Joseph Antoine Na'a (yellow card) 85'; Léo Ribeiro (yellow card) 90+1' | Stadium: Kleanthis Vikelidis Stadium; Referee: Christos Vergetis |

| 30 January 2024 Second leg | Niki Volos | 2 – 2 (5–2 agg.) | Aris Thessaloniki | Volos |
| 19:00 EET | Paschalis Kassos 35'; Vasilios Gavriilidis (yellow card) 44'; Léo Ribeiro 48'; Dimitrios Litenas (yellow card) 67' | Report | Kike Saverio 28' (pen.), 69' | Stadium: Panthessaliko Stadium; Referee: Alexandros Tsakalidis |

==== Semi-finals ====
Aris Thessaloniki faced Panetolikos in Semi-finals of Greek Cup. The draw took place on 20 October 2023.

| 13 February 2024 First leg | Panetolikos | 0 – 1 | Aris Thessaloniki | Agrinio |
| 19:30 EET | Alexandros Malis (yellow card) 34'; Levan Shengelia (yellow card) 43'; Angelos Tsingaras (yellow card) 85'; Charalampos Mavrias (yellow card) 90+2'; Nikos Karelis (yellow card) 90+3'; Frederico Duarte (yellow card) 90+6' | Report | Birger Verstraete (yellow card) 52'; Fran Vélez 64' | Stadium: Panetolikos Stadium; Referee: Aristotelis Diamantopoulos |

| 6 March 2024 Second leg | Aris Thessaloniki | 0 – 0 (1–0 agg.) | Panetolikos | Thessaloniki |
| 19:00 EET | Franco Ferrari (yellow card) 79'; Karim Ansarifard (yellow card) 90+2' | Report | Bruno Duarte (yellow card) 26'; Charalampos Mavrias (yellow card) 41'; Levan Shengelia (yellow card) 58'; João Pedro (yellow card) 81'; Juanpi (yellow card) 83' | Stadium: Kleanthis Vikelidis Stadium; Referee: Anastasios Papapetrou |

==== Final ====
| 25 May 2024 Final | Panathinaikos | 1 – 0 | Aris Thessaloniki | Volos |
| 15:30 EEST | Giannis Kotsiras (yellow card) 37' (yellow-red card) 51'; Adam Gnezda Čerin (yellow card) 43'; Juankar (yellow card) 90+4'; Georgios Vagiannidis 90+7' | Report | Vladimír Darida (yellow card) 15' (yellow-red card) 65'; Álvaro Zamora (yellow card) 37'; Martín Montoya (yellow card) 42'; Loren Morón (yellow card) 90+2' | Stadium: Panthessaliko Stadium; Referee: Stéphanie Frappart (France) |

=== UEFA Europa Conference League ===
Each tie in the qualifying phase was played over two legs, with each team playing one leg at home. If the aggregate score was level, extra time was played, followed by a penalty shoot-out. The away goals rule was not applied.

==== Second qualifying round ====
The draw for the second qualifying round was made on 21 June 2023.

| 27 July 2023 First leg | Ararat-Armenia | 1 – 1 | (Greece) Aris Thessaloniki | Yerevan, Armenia |
| 18:00 EEST | Wilfried Eza 11'; Junior Bueno (yellow card) 42'; Artyom Avanesyan (yellow card) 84'; Edgar Grigoryan (yellow card) 90+4' | Report | Luis Palma 20', (yellow card) 84'; Jean Jules (yellow card) 52'; Loren Morón (yellow card) 81' | Stadium: Yerevan Football Academy Stadium; Attendance: 1.400; Referee: Bulat Sariyev (Kazakhstan) |

| 3 August 2022 Second leg | Aris Thessaloniki (Greece) | 1 – 0 (2–1 agg.) | Ararat-Armenia | Thessaloniki |
| 21:15 EEST | Moses Odubajo (yellow card) 42'; Fabiano Leismann 80' | Report | Edgar Grigoryan (yellow card) 29'; Cássio Scheid (yellow card) 33'; Wilfried Eza (yellow card) 89' | Stadium: Kleanthis Vikelidis Stadium; Attendance: 11.217; Referee: Michael Fabbri (Italy) |

==== Third qualifying round ====
The draw for the third qualifying round was held on 24 July 2023.

| 10 August 2022 First leg | Aris Thessaloniki (Greece) | 1 – 0 | (Ukraine) Dynamo Kyiv | Thessaloniki |
| 21:15 EEST | Jean Jules (yellow card) 38'; Martín Montoya (yellow card) 51'; Fabiano Leismann (yellow card) 54'; Jonathan Menéndez (yellow card) 64'; Luis Palma 69' (pen.); Franco Ferrari (yellow card) 90+1' | Report | Oleksandr Tymchyk (yellow card) 3'; Mykola Shaparenko (yellow card) 16' | Stadium: Kleanthis Vikelidis Stadium; Attendance: 11.847; Referee: Jarred Gillett (Australia) |

| 17 August 2023 Second leg | Dynamo Kyiv (Ukraine) | 2 – 1 (a.e.t.) (2–2 (6–5 p) agg.) | (Greece) Aris Thessaloniki | Bucharest, Romania ^{1} |
| 20:00 EEST | Nazar Voloshyn 45'; Oleksandr Karavayev 85'; Oleksandr Syrota (yellow card) 105+1'; Oleksandr Andriyevskyi (yellow card) 110' | Report | Neven Đurasek 39'; Domagoj Pavičić (yellow card) 80' (yellow-red card) 106'; Luis Palma (yellow card) 82'; Rónald Matarrita (yellow card) 89'; Moses Odubajo (yellow card) 111' | Stadium: Stadionul Rapid-Giulești; Attendance: 21.204; Referee: Sebastian Gishamer (Austria) |
| | Penalties |
| | Volodymyr Brazhko (penalty scored); Oleksandr Andriyevskyi (penalty scored); Samba Diallo (penalty scored); Kaheem Parris (penalty missed); Olabiran Muyiwa (penalty scored); Maksym Dyachuk (penalty scored); Vladyslav Dubinchak (penalty scored) | | (penalty scored) Fabiano Leismann; (penalty missed) Jonathan Menéndez; (penalty scored) Lukas Rupp; (penalty scored) Franco Ferrari; (penalty scored) Lazaros Christodoulopoulos; (penalty scored) Álvaro Zamora; (penalty missed) Moses Odubajo |

- ^{1}Due to the Russian invasion of Ukraine, Ukrainian teams are required to play their home matches at neutral venues until further notice

== Squad statistics ==
=== Appearances ===
As of match played 25 May 2024

| # | Pos. | Nationality | Player | SL 1 | | GC | | UECL | | Total | |
| # | Pos. | Nationality | Player | Apps | Starts | Apps | Starts | Apps | Starts | Apps | Starts |
|---|---|---|---|---|---|---|---|---|---|---|---|
| 3 | DF | (Argentina) / (Italy) | Franco Ferrari | 22 | 16 | 4 | 3 | 4 | 3 | 30 | 22 |
| 4 | DF | (Brazil) | Fabiano Leismann | 27 | 26 | 5 | 5 | 4 | 4 | 36 | 35 |
| 5 | DF | (Greece) | Georgios Delizisis | 1 | 0 | 0 | 0 | 0 | 0 | 1 | 0 |
| 6 | MF | (Spain) | Manu García | 16 | 7 | 5 | 5 | 0 | 0 | 21 | 12 |
| 7 | FW | (Greece) | Lazaros Christodoulopoulos | 6 | 0 | 1 | 0 | 2 | 0 | 9 | 0 |
| 8 | MF | (Ivory Coast) / (France) | Cheick Doukouré | 10 | 4 | 5 | 3 | 0 | 0 | 15 | 7 |
| 9 | FW | (Costa Rica) | Jewison Bennette | 2 | 2 | 0 | 0 | 0 | 0 | 2 | 2 |
| 10 | MF | (Germany) | Lukas Rupp | 7 | 4 | 0 | 0 | 4 | 2 | 11 | 6 |
| 11 | FW | (Ecuador) / (Spain) | Kike Saverio | 20 | 12 | 6 | 5 | 1 | 0 | 27 | 17 |
| 12 | FW | (Costa Rica) | Álvaro Zamora | 32 | 10 | 7 | 3 | 1 | 0 | 40 | 13 |
| 13 | DF | (Costa Rica) | Rónald Matarrita | 1 | 1 | 0 | 0 | 4 | 1 | 5 | 2 |
| 14 | DF | (Czech Republic) | Jakub Brabec | 32 | 32 | 7 | 7 | 0 | 0 | 39 | 39 |
| 16 | MF | (Czech Republic) | Vladimír Darida | 33 | 28 | 7 | 6 | 4 | 4 | 44 | 38 |
| 17 | FW | (Iran) | Karim Ansarifard | 12 | 3 | 2 | 0 | 0 | 0 | 14 | 3 |
| 18 | DF | (Spain) / (Argentina) | Valentino Fattore | 7 | 6 | 1 | 1 | 0 | 0 | 8 | 7 |
| 19 | FW | (Greece) | Giannis Fetfatzidis | 18 | 6 | 5 | 1 | 0 | 0 | 23 | 7 |
| 20 | MF | (Croatia) | Neven Đurasek | 22 | 9 | 3 | 3 | 4 | 3 | 29 | 15 |
| 21 | MF | (Spain) | Rubén Pardo | 15 | 7 | 0 | 0 | 0 | 0 | 15 | 7 |
| 22 | DF | (England) / (Nigeria) | Moses Odubajo | 28 | 26 | 6 | 5 | 4 | 4 | 38 | 35 |
| 23 | GK | (Spain) | Julián Cuesta | 29 | 29 | 6 | 6 | 3 | 3 | 38 | 38 |
| 28 | MF | (Belgium) | Birger Verstraete | 24 | 19 | 5 | 1 | 0 | 0 | 29 | 20 |
| 30 | MF | (Cameroon) | Jean Jules | 22 | 17 | 3 | 2 | 4 | 3 | 29 | 22 |
| 32 | FW | (Sweden) | David Moberg Karlsson | 14 | 5 | 0 | 0 | 3 | 2 | 17 | 7 |
| 33 | DF | (Spain) | Martín Montoya | 31 | 26 | 6 | 5 | 2 | 2 | 39 | 33 |
| 44 | DF | (Spain) | Fran Vélez | 10 | 3 | 3 | 3 | 0 | 0 | 13 | 6 |
| 77 | FW | (Greece) | Michalis Panagidis | 14 | 11 | 2 | 1 | 0 | 0 | 16 | 12 |
| 80 | FW | (Spain) | Loren Morón | 35 | 30 | 6 | 6 | 4 | 3 | 45 | 39 |
| 92 | DF | (Mauritius) / (France) | Lindsay Rose | 17 | 11 | 3 | 0 | 0 | 0 | 20 | 11 |
| 93 | FW | (Russia) | Shapi Suleymanov | 31 | 27 | 6 | 5 | 0 | 0 | 37 | 32 |
| 94 | GK | (Greece) | Lefteris Choutesiotis | 7 | 7 | 1 | 1 | 1 | 1 | 9 | 9 |
Players who left the club during this season
| | DF | (France) / (Democratic Republic of the Congo) | Salem M'Bakata | 0 | 0 | 0 | 0 | 2 | 2 | 2 | 2 |
| | FW | (Honduras) | Luis Palma | 1 | 1 | 0 | 0 | 4 | 4 | 5 | 5 |
| | FW | (Jamaica) / (England) | Andre Gray | 0 | 0 | 0 | 0 | 1 | 1 | 1 | 1 |
| | MF | (Croatia) | Domagoj Pavičić | 2 | 0 | 0 | 0 | 4 | 0 | 6 | 0 |
| | FW | (Argentina) | Jonathan Menéndez | 17 | 11 | 1 | 0 | 4 | 2 | 22 | 13 |
| Total | | | | 36 | | 7 | | 4 | | 47 | |

=== Goals ===
As of match played 25 May 2024

| Ranking | Pos. | Nat. | Player | SL 1 | GC | UECL | Total |
|---|---|---|---|---|---|---|---|
| 1 | FW | (Spain) | Loren Morón | 20 | 1 | 0 | 21 |
| 2 | FW | (Russia) | Shapi Suleymanov | 5 | 1 | 0 | 6 |
| 3 | DF | (Brazil) | Fabiano Leismann | 4 | 0 | 1 | 5 |
| 3 | MF | (Czech Republic) | Vladimír Darida | 3 | 2 | 0 | 5 |
| 3 | FW | (Ecuador) / (Spain) | Kike Saverio | 3 | 2 | 0 | 5 |
| 6 | FW | (Costa Rica) | Álvaro Zamora | 4 | 0 | 0 | 4 |
| 7 | FW | (Greece) | Giannis Fetfatzidis | 3 | 0 | 0 | 3 |
| 8 | MF | (Croatia) | Neven Đurasek | 1 | 0 | 1 | 2 |
| 8 | FW | (Honduras) | Luis Palma | 0 | 0 | 2 | 2 |
| 10 | FW | (Greece) | Lazaros Christodoulopoulos | 1 | 0 | 0 | 1 |
| 10 | MF | (Spain) | Rubén Pardo | 1 | 0 | 0 | 1 |
| 10 | FW | (Argentina) | Jonathan Menéndez | 1 | 0 | 0 | 1 |
| 10 | FW | (Iran) | Karim Ansarifard | 1 | 0 | 0 | 1 |
| 10 | MF | (Spain) | Manu García | 1 | 0 | 0 | 1 |
| 10 | DF | (Czech Republic) | Jakub Brabec | 1 | 0 | 0 | 1 |
| 10 | DF | (Spain) / (Argentina) | Valentino Fattore | 1 | 0 | 0 | 1 |
| 10 | DF | (Spain) | Fran Vélez | 0 | 1 | 0 | 1 |
| Own Goals | | | | 1 | 0 | 0 | 1 |
| Total | | | | 51 | 7 | 4 | 62 |

=== Clean Sheets ===
As of match played 25 May 2024

| # | Nat. | Player | SL 1 | GC | UECL | Total |
|---|---|---|---|---|---|---|
| 23 | (Spain) | Julián Cuesta | 12 | 4 | 2 | 18 |
| 94 | (Greece) | Lefteris Choutesiotis | 2 | 0 | 0 | 2 |
| Total | | | 14 | 4 | 2 | 20 |

== Players' awards ==
=== Best Goal (Super League 1) ===
| Matchday | Nat. | Player | Ref |
Regular Season
| 1st | (Spain) | Loren Morón | |
| 5th | (Spain) | Loren Morón | |
| 7th | (Spain) | Loren Morón | |
| 26th | (Greece) | Giannis Fetfatzidis | |
Play-offs
| 7th & 8th & 9th | (Spain) | Loren Morón | |
Play-offs & Play-outs
| 10th & 7th | (Spain) | Loren Morón | |

=== Player of the Month (Super League 1) ===
| Month | Nat. | Player | Ref |
|---|---|---|---|
| November | (Spain) | Loren Morón | |
| March | (Spain) | Loren Morón | |

=== Stoiximan Player of the Club ===
| Nat. | Player | Ref |
|---|---|---|
| (Spain) | Loren Morón | |
