= Mantzios =

Mantzios is a Greek surname. Notable people with the surname include:

- Apostolos Mantzios (born 1969), Greek footballer and manager
- Vangelis Mantzios (born 1983), Greek footballer
- Matthaios Mantzios (born 1978), User Experience professional
