= Valentino Fattore =

Spanish footballer

Personal information
- Full name: Valentino Fattore Scotta
- Date of birth: 10 August 2001 (age 25)
- Place of birth: Buenos Aires, Argentina
- Height: 1.78 m (5 ft 10 in)
- Position: Right-back

Team information
- Current team: Sevilla B
- Number: 20

Youth career
- Nervión
- 2009–2020: Sevilla

Senior career*
Years	Team	Apps	(Gls)
2018	Sevilla C	1	(0)
2019–2023	Sevilla B	77	(9)
2021–2023	Sevilla	1	(0)
2023–2025	Aris	10	(1)
2025–2026	Marbella	11	(0)
2026–	Sevilla B	15	(3)

International career
2020	Spain U19	1	(0)
- * Club domestic league appearances and goals as of 10 June 2026

Valentino Fattore Scotta (born 10 August 2001) is a professional footballer who plays as a right-back for Primera Federación side Sevilla Atlético. Born in Argentina, he is a youth international for Spain.

== Club career ==
Born in Buenos Aires, Fattore moved to Spain at early age, and joined Sevilla FC's at the age of eight, from local side AD Nervión. He made his senior debut with the C-team on 16 September 2018, aged 17, by starting in a 1–2 Tercera División home loss against Córdoba CF B.

Fattore first appeared with the reserves on 21 April 2019, coming on as a second-half substitute for Chris Ramos in a 1–2 home loss against Recreativo de Huelva. He was definitely promoted to the B-side ahead of the 2020–21 campaign, and renewed his contract until 2023 on 23 February 2021.

Fattore made his first team – and La Liga – debut on 21 December 2021, replacing Lucas Ocampos late into a 1–1 home draw against FC Barcelona.

On 2 February 2026, Fattore returned to Sevilla Atlético.

== International career ==
Born in Argentina and raised in Spain, Fattore is of Italian descent through his father, and therefore holds Argentine, Italian, and Spanish nationalities. He represented the latter's under-19 team in a 1–1 friendly with Italy on 15 January 2020.

== Personal life ==
Fattore's grandfather Héctor Scotta was also a footballer. A forward, he represented Sevilla in the late 1970s.

== Career statistics ==
As of match played 29 May 2025

Club	Season	League			National cup (Note: Includes Greek Football Cup)		Total	
Club	Season	Division	Apps	Goals	Apps	Goals	Apps	Goals
Sevilla B	2018–19	Segunda División B	2	0	—		2	0
Sevilla B	2019–20	Segunda División B	0	0	—		0	0
Sevilla B	2020–21	Segunda División B	12	2	—		12	2
Sevilla B	2021–22	Segunda División B	30	2	—		30	2
Sevilla B	2022–23	Segunda Federación	33	5	—		33	5
Sevilla B	Total		77	9	—		77	9
Sevilla	2021–22	La Liga	1	0	0	0	1	0
Aris	2023–24	Super League Greece	7	1	1	0	8	1
Aris	2024–25	Super League Greece	3	0	0	0	3	0
Aris	Total		10	1	1	0	11	1
Career total			88	10	1	0	89	10
