= Dimitrios Tsakmakis =

Greek footballer

Personal information
- Date of birth: 28 July 1999 (age 27)
- Place of birth: Thessaloniki, Greece
- Height: 1.87 m (6 ft 2 in)
- Position: Centre-back

Team information
- Current team: Atromitos
- Number: 44

Youth career
- Platanias

Senior career*
Years	Team	Apps	(Gls)
2018–2019	Platanias	6	(0)
2020	A.O. Agios Nikolaos		
2020–2021	O.F. Ierapetra	3	(0)
2021	Triglia	7	(0)
2021–2022	FK Panevėžys	5	(0)
2022–2023	Panachaiki	23	(1)
2023–	Atromitos	44	(2)
- * Club domestic league appearances and goals as of 30 August 2026

Dimitrios Tsakmakis (Greek: Δημήτριος Τσακμάκης; born 28 July 1999) is a Greek professional footballer who plays as a centre-back for Super League club Atromitos.
