= Bruno Duarte (footballer, born 1995) =

Argentine footballer

Personal information
- Full name: Bruno Exequiel Duarte
- Date of birth: 20 June 1995 (age 31)
- Place of birth: Federal, Entre Ríos, Argentina
- Height: 1.90 m (6 ft 3 in)
- Position: Centre-back

Team information
- Current team: UTC
- Number: 2

Youth career
- Patronato

Senior career*
Years	Team	Apps	(Gls)
2016–2019	Patronato II		
2019–2022	Tristán Suárez	60	(3)
2022	→ Deportivo Cuenca (loan)	27	(2)
2023–2024	Deportivo Cuenca	23	(1)
2023–2024	→ Panetolikos (loan)	24	(2)
2025–2026	Temperley	27	(0)
2026–	UTC	7	(1)
- * Club domestic league appearances and goals as of 14 March 2026

Bruno Exequiel Duarte (born 20 June 1995) is an Argentine professional footballer who plays as a centre-back for UTC.

== Career ==
=== Loan to Panetolikos ===
On 10 July 2023, Duarte signed a one-year contract with Greek Super League club Panetolikos.
