= Franco Ferrari (footballer, born 1992) =

Argentine professional footballer

Personal information
- Full name: Franco Ariel Ferrari
- Date of birth: 9 May 1992 (age 34)
- Place of birth: Rosario, Argentina
- Height: 1.67 m (5 ft 6 in)
- Position: Left-back

Team information
- Current team: Mitre

Senior career*
Years	Team	Apps	(Gls)
2011–2014	Tiro Federal	72	(7)
2015	Santamarina	15	(0)
2016	Puerto San Martín	2	(0)
2016–2019	Mitre	92	(1)
2019–2022	Volos	90	(3)
2022–2023	APOEL	25	(0)
2023–2024	Aris	22	(0)
2024–2025	Volos	31	(0)
2026–	Mitre	8	(0)
- * Club domestic league appearances and goals as of 17:07, 2 May 2026 (UTC)

Franco Ariel Ferrari (born 9 May 1992) is an Argentine professional footballer who last played left-back for the Mitre.

== Career ==
Ferrari began his career with Tiro Federal. He was selected on two occasions in 2010–11, including his professional debut against Ferro Carril Oeste on 11 June 2011. Ferrari scored seven goals across his following four seasons, in Torneo Argentino A/Torneo Federal A following 2011 relegation, with Tiro Federal, three of which arrived in separate fixtures against Libertad. Ferrari spent the 2015 Primera B Nacional campaign with Santamarina, making fifteen appearances under Gustavo Coleoni as the club finished fourth; losing in the promotion play-offs to Patronato. A short stint with Torneo Federal B's Puerto San Martín occurred in early 2016.

Ferrari spent the majority of 2016 with Mitre of Torneo Federal A. After one goal in forty-six encounters with Mitre, the defender was part of their promotion winning squad of 2016–17. In June 2019, ahead of 2019–20, Ferrari agreed a move to Greek club Volos.

On 30 June 2023, Ferrari signed a two-year contract with Aris.

== Career statistics ==
As of 9 August 2024

Appearances and goals by club, season and competition
Club	Season	League			National cup		League cup		Continental		Other		Total	
Club	Season	Division	Apps	Goals	Apps	Goals	Apps	Goals	Apps	Goals	Apps	Goals	Apps	Goals
Tiro Federal	2010–11	Primera B Nacional	2	0	0	0	—		—		0	0	2	0
Tiro Federal	2011–12	Torneo Argentino A	8	0	0	0	—		—		0	0	8	0
Tiro Federal	2012–13	Torneo Argentino A	23	1	0	0	—		—		2 (Note: Appearance(s) in the Torneo Argentino A play-offs)	0	25	1
Tiro Federal	2013–14	Torneo Argentino A	25	4	0	0	—		—		4	0	29	4
Tiro Federal	2014	Torneo Federal A	14	2	0	0	—		—		2 (Note: Appearance(s) in the Torneo Federal A play-offs)	0	16	2
Tiro Federal	Total		72	7	0	0	—		—		8	0	80	7
Santamarina	2015	Primera B Nacional	15	0	1	0	—		—		0	0	16	0
Puerto San Martín	2016	Torneo Federal B	2	0	0	0	—		—		0	0	2	0
Mitre	2016	Torneo Federal A	11	1	0	0	—		—		2	0	13	1
Mitre	2016–17	Torneo Federal A	33	0	0	0	—		—		0	0	33	0
Mitre	2017–18	Primera B Nacional	24	0	2	0	—		—		0	0	26	0
Mitre	2018–19	Primera B Nacional	24	0	1	0	—		—		0	0	25	0
Mitre	Total		92	1	3	0	—		—		2	0	97	1
Volos	2019–20	Super League Greece	31	0	3	0	—		—		—		34	0
Volos	2020–21	Super League Greece	31	1	4	0	—		—		—		35	1
Volos	2021–22	Super League Greece	28	2	3	0	—		—		—		31	2
Volos	Total		90	3	10	0	—		—		—		100	3
APOEL	2022–23	Cypriot First Division	25	0	2	0	—		5	0	—		32	0
Aris	2023–24	Super League Greece	22	0	4	0	—		4	0	—		30	0
Career total			318	11	20	0	0	0	9	0	10	0	357	11

== Honours ==
=== Individual ===
- Super League Greece Team of the Season: 2020–21
