= Michalis Panagidis =

Greek footballer

Personal information
- Full name: Michail Panagidis
- Date of birth: 11 February 2004 (age 22)
- Place of birth: Thessaloniki, Greece
- Height: 1.75 m (5 ft 9 in)
- Position: Winger

Team information
- Current team: Krasava ENY

Youth career
- 2014–2018: PAOK
- 2018–2022: Aris

Senior career*
Years	Team	Apps	(Gls)
2022–2026	Aris	22	(0)

International career^{‡}
2023–2024	Greece U21	4	(1)
- * Club domestic league appearances and goals as of 5 July 2026 ‡ National team caps and goals as of 26 June 2024

Michalis Panagidis (Greek: Μιχάλης Παναγίδης; born 11 February 2004) is a Greek professional footballer who plays as a winger for Cypriot First Division club Krasava ENY.

== Career ==
On 21 July 2022, Panagidis signed his first professional contract with Aris. He made his professional debut on 24 September 2023, replacing Vladimír Darida in a 3–0 home win over Panetolikos.

== Career statistics ==
As of match played on 5 July 2026

Club	Season	League			Cup		Continental		Other		Total	
Club	Season	Division	Apps	Goals	Apps	Goals	Apps	Goals	Apps	Goals	Apps	Goals
Aris	2023–24	Superleague Greece	14	0	2	0	—		—		16	0
Aris	2024–25	Superleague Greece	0	0	0	0	—		—		0	0
Aris	2025–26	Superleague Greece	8	0	5	0	0	0	—		13	0
Aris	Total		22	0	7	0	0	0	—		29	0
Career total			22	0	7	0	0	0	0	0	29	0
