= Kike Saverio =

Spanish footballer (born 1999)

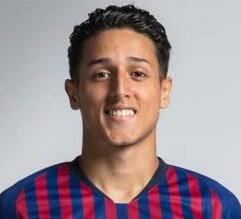
- Saverio in 2019

Personal information
- Full name: Javier Enrique Delgado Saverio
- Date of birth: 19 June 1999 (age 27)
- Place of birth: Genoa, Italy
- Height: 1.78 m (5 ft 10 in)
- Position: Winger

Team information
- Current team: Vitória
- Number: 19

Youth career
- Cornellà
- 2015–2018: Barcelona

Senior career*
Years	Team	Apps	(Gls)
2018–2020	Barcelona B	37	(6)
2020	Osasuna B	1	(0)
2020–2023	Osasuna	0	(0)
2021	→ Andorra (loan)	12	(1)
2021–2022	→ Ponferradina (loan)	29	(1)
2023	Deportivo La Coruña	15	(2)
2023–2025	Aris	45	(5)
2025–	Vitória	8	(1)

International career
2017	Spain U19	1	(0)
- * Club domestic league appearances and goals as of 8 April 2026

Javier Enrique "Kike" Delgado Saverio (born 19 June 1999) is an Ecuadorian professional footballer who played as a winger for Campeonato Brasileiro Série A club Vitória.

== Club career ==
=== Barcelona ===
Born in Genoa to Ecuadorian parents, Saverio moved to Balzar, Ecuador as an infant, before moving to Barcelona at the age of five. He joined Barcelona's La Masia in 2015, from Cornellà.

On 12 July 2018, Saverio renewed his contract until 2020, with a release clause of €50 million, being subsequently promoted to the reserves in Segunda División B. He made his senior debut on 26 August of that year, coming on as a second-half substitute for goalscorer Ballou Tabla in a 1–3 loss at Alcoyano.

Saverio scored his first senior goal on 29 September 2018, netting the opener in a 2–1 home success over Olot. In October, however, he suffered an injury in his left leg, being sidelined for four months.

On 30 June 2020, Saverio left Barça as his contract expired.

=== Osasuna ===
On 16 September 2020, Saverio signed a three-year contract with Osasuna, being initially assigned to the B-team in the third division. He made his debut on 25 October, starting in a 0–2 loss at Tudelano.

Saverio made his first team debut on 15 December 2020, starting and scoring his team's fourth in a 6–0 away routing of Tomares, for the season's Copa del Rey.

==== Loan to Andorra ====
On 1 February 2021, Saverio joined third-tier side Andorra on loan until the end of the season.

==== Loan to Ponferradina ====
On 28 July 2021, Saverio moved to Segunda División side Ponferradina on a one-year loan deal. He made his professional debut on 22 August, replacing goalscorer José Naranjo in a 1–0 away win over Eibar.

On 7 May 2022, after scoring Ponfe's third goal in a 3–1 home win over Burgos (which was his first professional goal), Saverio suffered an Achilles tendon injury, being sidelined for the remainder of the season.

=== Deportivo La Coruña ===
On 21 January 2023, Saverio signed to Primera Federación side Deportivo La Coruña on a two-and-a-half-year contract.

=== Aris ===
On 2 July 2023, Saverio joined Aris on a two-year deal with an option for another season.

== International career ==
Eligible to represent Italy, Ecuador and Spain, Saverio made his debut for the latter's under-19s on 14 November 2017, in a 1–2 loss at Portugal. In 2019, he was called up to the Ecuador under-20 squad for trainings ahead of the 2019 FIFA U-20 World Cup, but did not make the final squad.

== Career statistics ==
=== Club ===
As of match played 26 June 2025

Appearances and goals by club, season and competition
Club	Season	League			Cup		Continental		Other		Total	
Club	Season	Division	Apps	Goals	Apps	Goals	Apps	Goals	Apps	Goals	Apps	Goals
Barcelona B	2018–19	Segunda División B	15	1	—		—		—		15	1
Barcelona B	2019–20	Segunda División B	22	5	—		—		—		22	5
Barcelona B	Total		37	6	—		—		—		37	6
Osasuna B	2020–21	Segunda División B	1	0	—		—		—		1	0
Osasuna	2020–21	La Liga	0	0	2	1	—		—		2	1
Andorra (loan)	2020–21	Segunda División B	12	1	—		—		—		12	1
Ponferradina (loan)	2021–22	Segunda División	29	1	3	0	—		—		32	1
Deportivo La Coruña	2022–23	Segunda División B	15	2	0	0	—		—		15	2
Aris	2023–24	Superleague Greece	20	3	6	2	1	0	—		27	5
Aris	2024–25	Superleague Greece	25	2	2	0	1	0	—		27	2
Aris	Total		45	5	8	2	1	0	—		54	7
Career total			138	15	13	3	1	0	0	0	153	18

== Honours ==
Barcelona

- UEFA Youth League: 2017–18
