= Stéphanie Frappart =

French association football referee (born 1983)

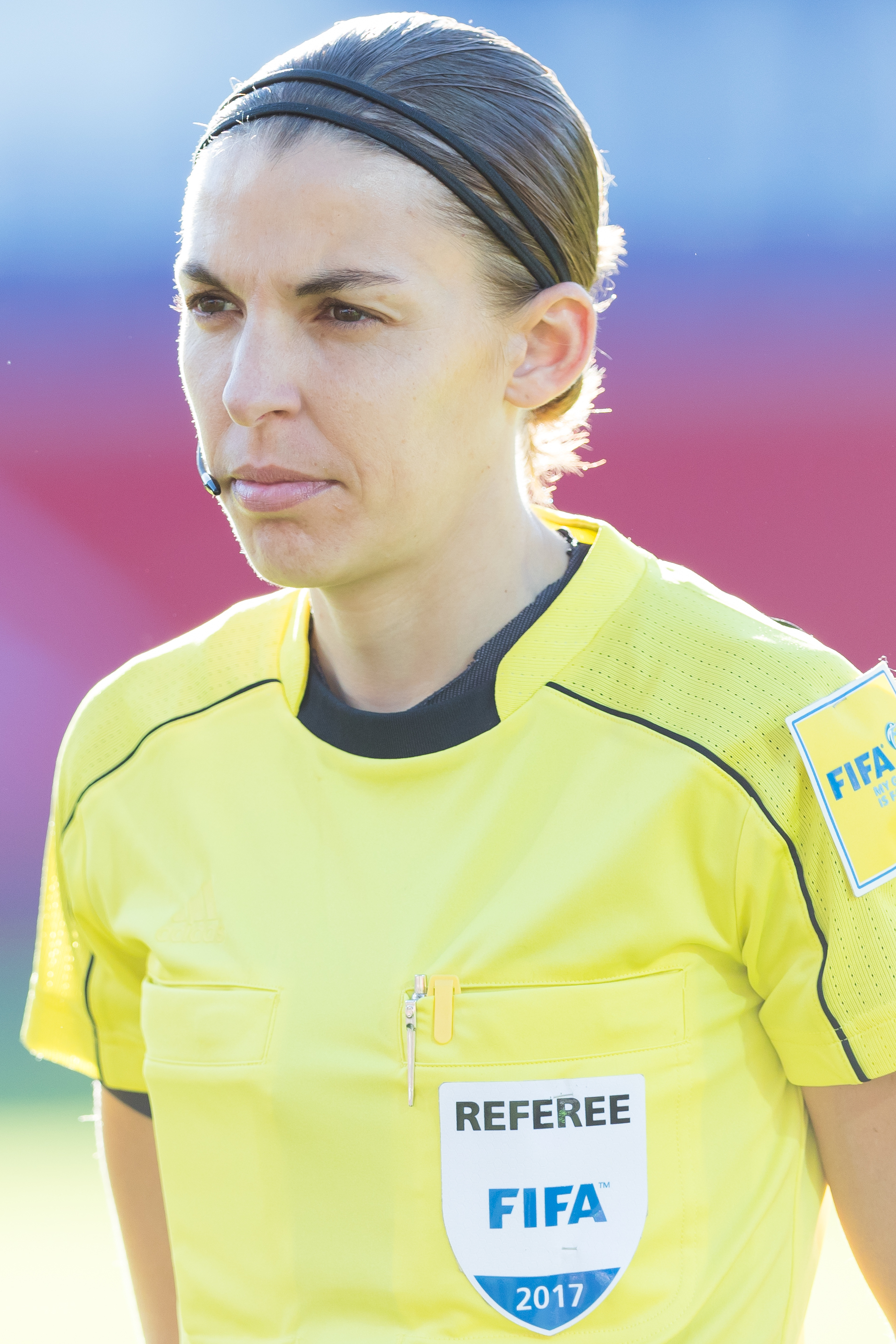
- Frappart in 2017
- Born: Stéphanie Amélie Marthe Frappart; 14 December 1983 (age 42); Le Plessis-Bouchard, France
- Other occupation: UEFA Refereeing Officer

Domestic
| Years | League | Role |
| 2011–2026 | Championnat National | Referee |
| 2014–2026 | Ligue 2 | Referee |
| 2019–2026 | Ligue 1 | Referee |
| 2019 | 2019 UEFA Super Cup | Referee |
| 2022 | 2022 Coupe de France Final | Referee |
| 2024 | 2024 Greek Cup Final | Referee |

International
| Years | League | Role |
| 2009–2026 | FIFA listed | Referee |
| 2015 | 2015 FIFA Women's World Cup | Referee |
| 2019 | 2019 FIFA Women's World Cup | Referee |
| 2022 | 2022 FIFA World Cup | Referee |
| 2023 | 2023 FIFA Women's World Cup | Referee |
| 2025 | 2025 UEFA Women's Euro | Referee |

Stéphanie Amélie Marthe Frappart (French pronunciation: [stefani fʁapaʁ]; born 14 December 1983) is a French football referee. She has been on the FIFA International Referees List since 2009.

Frappart became the first woman to referee a major men's European match and a French Ligue 1 match, both in 2019, and the first woman to officiate a UEFA Champions League match in 2020. In 2021, she became the first woman to take charge of a men's World Cup qualifying match. In 2022, Frappart was one of the three women referees selected to officiate at the men's World Cup, before she became the first woman to referee a men's World Cup match in an all-female referee team.

== Early life and career ==
Stéphanie Amélie Marthe Frappart grew up in Herblay-sur-Seine and began refereeing youth games at the age of 13. By the time she was 18, she was already refereeing national U-19 games. In 2011, Frappart began to referee matches in the Championnat National, the third division of men's football in France. In 2014, Frappart became the first woman to referee in Ligue 2, the second tier of professional men's football in France. She served as a referee at the 2015 FIFA Women's World Cup in Canada.

On 3 December 2018, Frappart was appointed to officiate in the 2019 FIFA Women's World Cup in France. After the conclusion of the round of 16, it was announced that Frappart had been selected as one of 11 officials that would be retained for the remainder of the tournament. Frappart would go on to be appointed to referee the final of the tournament which was contested on 7 July 2019 between the United States and the Netherlands.

In April 2019, it was announced that she would become the first female referee in Ligue 1, with her first game coming on 28 April 2019, when she officiated a game between SC Amiens and RC Strasbourg. On 2 August 2019, Frappart was appointed to referee the 2019 UEFA Super Cup between Liverpool and Chelsea. In doing so she became the first woman to officiate in a major men's European match. On 11 November 2019, Frappart officiated the second leg of the inaugural Champions Cup competition, between the league winners of the League of Ireland Premier Division and the NIFL Premiership. The match saw the Republic of Ireland's champions Dundalk beat Northern Ireland's champions Linfield 6–0, with Frappart showing two yellow cards.

On 2 December 2020, she became the first woman to referee a UEFA Champions League match, between Juventus and Dynamo Kyiv. In March 2021, Frappart officiated the second leg of the UEFA Women's Champions League match between Atlético Madrid and Chelsea. Later that month, she became the first woman to officiate a FIFA World Cup qualifier, in a match between the Netherlands and Latvia.

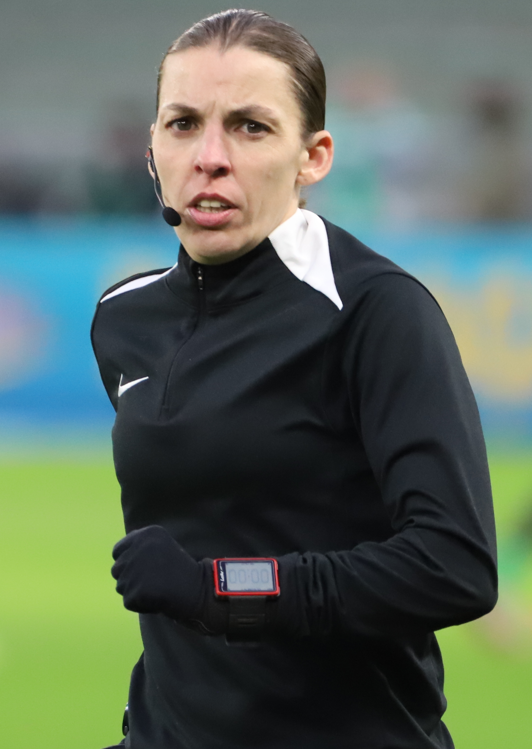
Frappart warming up for a match in 2025

On 7 May 2022, she was the referee for the 2022 Coupe de France Final between Nice and Nantes.

On 19 May 2022, she was selected for the officiating pool at the 2022 FIFA World Cup. On 1 December 2022, she became the first woman to referee a men's FIFA World Cup match when she officiated the match between Costa Rica and Germany.

On 9 January 2023, FIFA appointed Frappart to the officiating pool for the 2023 FIFA Women's World Cup in Australia and New Zealand. On 27 July 2025 — Frappart took charge of Women's Euro 2025 final between England and Spain.

Frappart announced her retirement from refereeing in July of 2026 to take a position in UEFA as their refereeing officer.

== List of major matches refereed ==
| Date | Match | Tournament | Venue | Result | Ref |
|---|---|---|---|---|---|
| 7 July 2019 | United States vs. Netherlands | 2019 FIFA Women's World Cup final | Parc Olympique Lyonnais, Décines-Charpieu | 2–0 | |
| 14 August 2019 | Liverpool vs. Chelsea | 2019 UEFA Super Cup final (men's tournament) | Vodafone Park, Istanbul | 2–2 (a.e.t.; Liverpool won 5–4 on penalties) | |
| 27 July 2025 | England vs. Spain | UEFA Women's Euro 2025 final | St. Jakob-Park, Basel | 1–1 (a.e.t.; England won 3–1 on penalties) | |

== Honours ==
- IFFHS World's Best Woman Referee: 2019, 2020, 2021, 2022, 2023
- Knight of the National Order of Merit: 2019

| Preceded by (Ukraine) Kateryna Monzul | 2019 FIFA Women's World Cup Final (France) Stéphanie Frappart | Succeeded by (United States) Tori Penso |
| Preceded by (Ukraine) Kateryna Monzul | 2025 UEFA Women's Euro Final (France) Stéphanie Frappart | Succeeded by (N/A) to be determined |
