= Loren Morón (footballer, born 1993) =

Spanish footballer

Loren
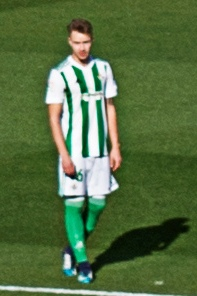
- Loren with Betis in 2018

Personal information
- Full name: Lorenzo Jesús Morón García
- Date of birth: 30 December 1993 (age 32)
- Place of birth: Marbella, Spain
- Height: 1.88 m (6 ft 2 in)
- Position: Striker

Team information
- Current team: Aris
- Number: 80

Youth career
- 2007–2011: Peña Los Compadres
- 2011: UD Marbella
- 2011–2012: Vázquez Cultural

Senior career*
Years	Team	Apps	(Gls)
2012–2013	Estepona	15	(2)
2013	UD Marbella	10	(3)
2013–2015	Marbella FC	21	(7)
2014–2015	→ Vélez (loan)	21	(14)
2015–2018	Betis B	92	(43)
2018–2023	Betis	113	(24)
2021–2022	→ Espanyol (loan)	21	(1)
2023	→ Las Palmas (loan)	11	(1)
2023–	Aris	93	(42)
- * Club domestic league appearances and goals as of 22:00, 19 September 2026 (UTC)

Lorenzo Jesús Morón García (born 30 December 1993), known as Loren, is a Spanish professional footballer who plays as a striker for Super League Greece club Aris.

== Club career ==
=== Early career ===
Loren was born in Marbella, Province of Málaga, Andalusia, and represented CD Peña Los Compadres, UD Marbella and CD Vázquez Cultural as a youth. In 2012, he signed for Tercera División club Unión Estepona CF, making his senior debut on 1 September of that year in a 1–0 home loss against CD El Palo.

Loren scored his first goal on 30 September 2012, his team's third in a 4–1 home victory over Vélez CF. He returned to Marbella (also in the fourth division) the following January.

On 8 July 2014, after achieving promotion, Loren was loaned to fourth-tier side Vélez for a year.

=== Betis ===
On 29 January 2015, Loren signed for Real Betis and was immediately assigned to the reserves in the Segunda División B. In June 2016, having scored 13 goals but failed to avoid relegation, he renewed his contract until 2018.

Loren scored a hat-trick in a 7–1 away rout of CA Espeleño on 14 May 2017. The following 30 January, he extended his link until 2021 and was definitely promoted to the first team in La Liga. He made his professional debut on 3 February, starting and scoring a brace in a 2–1 home defeat of Villarreal CF; in the next five matches, he netted a further four times.

On 30 June 2018, Loren renewed his contract until June 2022. He made an impressive start to the 2019–20 season, leading him to being linked to FC Barcelona, Tottenham Hotspur, SSC Napoli and AC Milan; however, he agreed to a further extension at the Estadio Benito Villamarín until 2024, with his buyout clause being set at €50 million.

Loren joined RCD Espanyol on 25 August 2021, on loan for the top-flight campaign. He scored his first goals on 1 December in the opening round of the Copa del Rey, a hat-trick in a 3–2 win at sixth-tier side SD Solares-Medio Cudeyo.

In 2022–23, Loren was rarely played by Betis manager Manuel Pellegrini; on 12 January 2023, however, shortly after having come on as a 91st-minute substitute for Nabil Fekir in the semi-finals of the Supercopa de España held in Riyadh, his backheel equalised 2–2 against Barcelona and he later converted his attempt in the shootout (4–2 loss). Nineteen days later, he was loaned to UD Las Palmas of the Segunda División until June.

=== Aris ===
On 19 July 2023, after helping Las Palmas in their promotion to the top division, Loren terminated his contract with Betis. Two days later, Aris Thessaloniki F.C. announced his acquisition on a two-year deal. He scored his first goal in a 3–2 away defeat against OFI Crete FC, adding a brace on 24 September to help the hosts to beat Panetolikos F.C. 3–0; he finished his first season as top scorer at 20 goals to help his team to reach the Super League Greece championship play-offs, where he netted six times in ten games.

== Personal life ==
Loren's father, also named Lorenzo, was also a footballer. A central defender, he represented mainly UD Salamanca and Recreativo de Huelva.

== Career statistics ==
As of match played 12 April 2026

Appearances and goals by club, season and competition
Club	Season	League			National cup (Note: Includes Copa del Rey, Greek Football Cup)		Continental		Other		Total	
Club	Season	Division	Apps	Goals	Apps	Goals	Apps	Goals	Apps	Goals	Apps	Goals
Estepona	2012–13	Tercera División	15	2	—		—		—		15	2
UD Marbella	2012–13	Tercera División	10	3	—		—		—		10	3
Marbella FC	2013–14	Tercera División	21	7	—		—		1 (Note: Appearances in Tercera División promotion playoffs)	0	22	7
Vélez	2014–15	Tercera División	21	14	—		—		—		21	14
Betis B	2014–15	Segunda División B	10	0	—		—		—		10	0
Betis B	2015–16	Segunda División B	30	13	—		—		—		30	13
Betis B	2016–17	Tercera División	29	14	—		—		2	1	31	15
Betis B	2017–18	Segunda División B	23	16	—		—		—		23	16
Betis B	Total		92	43	—		—		2	1	94	44
Betis	2017–18	La Liga	15	7	0	0	—		—		15	7
Betis	2018–19	La Liga	33	6	6	2	6 (Note: Appearances in UEFA Europa League)	0	—		45	8
Betis	2019–20	La Liga	36	10	3	2	—		—		39	12
Betis	2020–21	La Liga	26	1	1	0	—		—		27	1
Betis	2021–22	La Liga	1	0	0	0	—		—		1	0
Betis	2022–23	La Liga	2	0	1	0	—		1 (Note: Appearance in Supercopa de España)	1	4	1
Betis	Total		113	24	11	4	6	0	1	1	131	29
Espanyol (loan)	2021–22	La Liga	21	1	4	3	—		—		25	4
Las Palmas (loan)	2022–23	Segunda División	11	1	0	0	—		—		11	1
Aris	2023–24	Super League Greece	35	20	6	1	4 (Note: Appearances in UEFA Europa Conference League)	0	—		45	21
Aris	2024–25	Super League Greece	30	18	2	1	—		—		32	19
Aris	2025–26	Super League Greece	23	4	6	3	2	1	—		31	8
Aris	Total		88	42	14	5	6	1	—		108	48
Career total			392	137	29	12	12	1	4	2	468	160

== Honours ==
Individual

- Super League Greece top scorer: 2023–24
- Super League Greece Team of the Season: 2023–24, 2024–25
- Super League Greece Player of the Month: November 2023, March 2024, October 2024, February 2025, April 2025
- Aris Player of the Season: 2023–24, 2024–25
