= Jakub Brabec =

Czech footballer

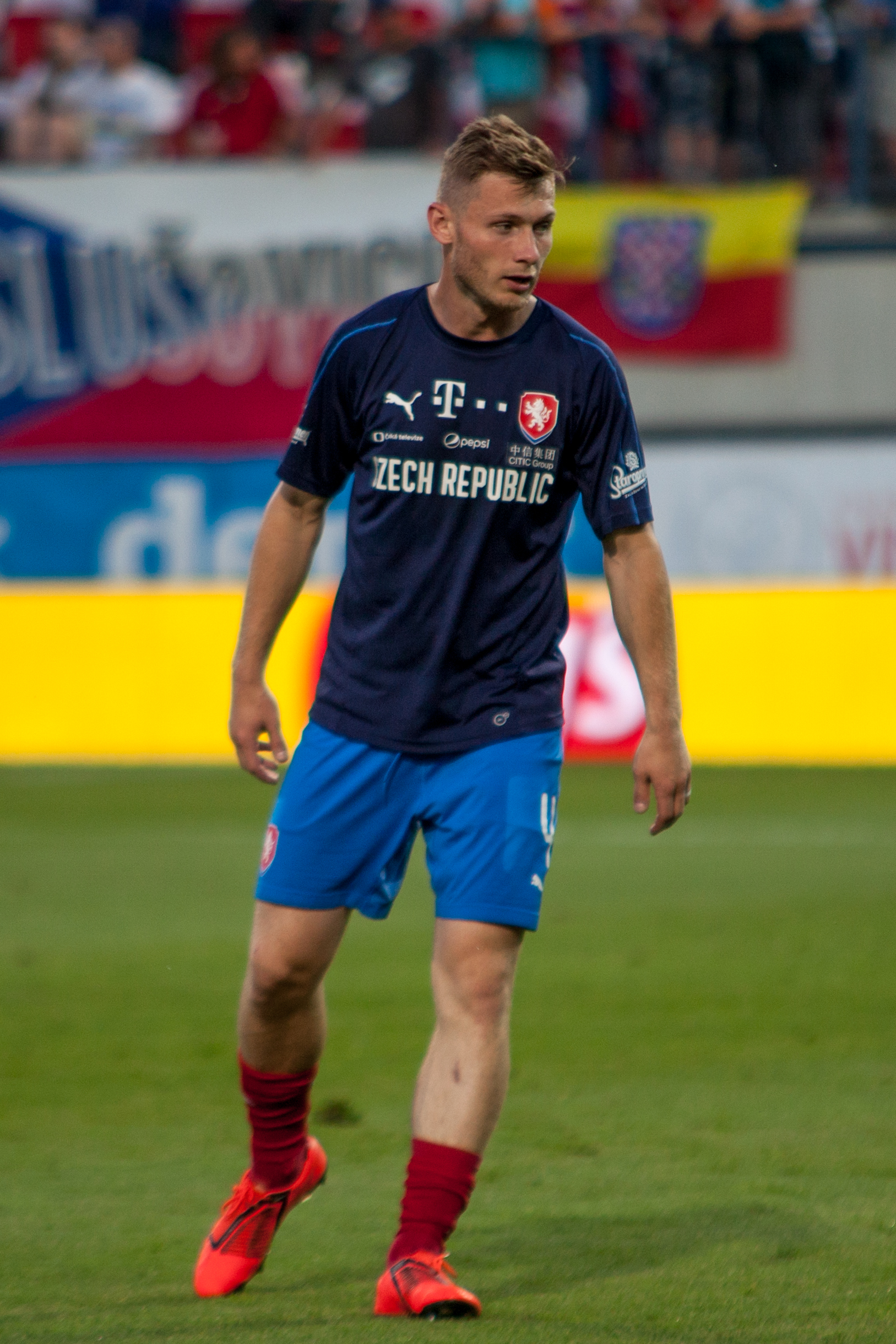
- Brabec with the Czech Republic in 2019

Personal information
- Date of birth: 6 August 1992 (age 34)
- Place of birth: Prague, Czechoslovakia
- Height: 1.86 m (6 ft 1 in)
- Position: Centre-back

Team information
- Current team: Rio Ave
- Number: 14

Youth career
- –2008: Sparta Prague

Senior career*
Years	Team	Apps	(Gls)
2008–2011	Viktoria Žižkov	22	(0)
2011–2016	Sparta Prague	71	(6)
2011–2012	→ Sparta Prague B	18	(3)
2012–2013	→ Zbrojovka Brno (loan)	18	(0)
2016–2019	Genk	37	(2)
2018–2019	→ Çaykur Rizespor (loan)	17	(0)
2019	→ Viktoria Plzeň (loan)	10	(0)
2019–2021	Viktoria Plzeň	69	(4)
2021–2025	Aris	119	(6)
2025–	Rio Ave	27	(1)

International career^{‡}
2009–2010	Czech Republic U18	3	(1)
2009–2011	Czech Republic U19	18	(1)
2012	Czech Republic U20	1	(0)
2012–2015	Czech Republic U21	15	(0)
2016–	Czech Republic	40	(2)
- * Club domestic league appearances and goals as of 25 August 2026 ‡ National team caps and goals as of 15 October 2023

Jakub Brabec (born 6 August 1992) is a Czech professional footballer who plays as a centre-back for Primeira Liga club Rio Ave and the Czech national team.

== Club career ==
Brabec was part of the youth system at Sparta Prague, but having been released in summer 2008, he joined Viktoria Žižkov, another Prague-based club. He was promoted to the Žižkov first team during the 2008–09 Czech First League season, when he was still at school. He made one league appearance for the club in this season, playing a full match against Viktoria Plzen as a 16-year-old in a 2–0 defeat.

In the 2009–10 season, Brabec played a further 14 games for Žižkov, who were then playing in the second tier Czech 2. Liga. One of the fourteen appearances was as a substitute. In one match in this season against FC Zenit Čáslav, he received a 31st-minute red card. He made six appearances in the Czech 2. Liga in the following 2010–11 season, four of which were as a substitute. He helped Žižkov achieve a second-place league finish and promotion back to the Czech First League.

Brabec returned to Sparta Prague for an undisclosed fee in June 2011. He told UEFA.com that his primary motivation for making the transfer was that he was a childhood fan of his former club and that he would have a better chance of playing in the UEFA Cup and the Uefa Champions League. He started the 2011–12 season with the reserve team, Sparta Prague II, who compete in the 2. Liga.

On 31 August 2016, Brabec signed a four-year contract with Genk.

=== Aris ===
On 31 August 2021, Aris officially announced the signing of Brabec for an undisclosed fee on a three-year contract. On 18 October 2021, he scored his first goal sealing a precious 1–0 away win against Lamia.

On 13 March 2023, Brabec signed a contract extension with the club until summer 2026.

=== Rio Ave ===
On 8 September 2025, Brabec signed a two-year contract with Primeira Liga club Rio Ave.

== International career ==
=== Youth ===
Brabec has represented the Czech Republic at youth international level. He scored his first national goal on his third and final appearance for the Czech Republic under-18s in a 3–1 loss to the Austria under-18s in a March 2010 friendly match.

Later in 2009, he made his debut for the Czech Republic under-19s in a 4–0 win over the Malta under-19s.

Brabec was selected as captain of the Czech Republic under-19s squad for the 2011 UEFA European Under-19 Championship. His first goal at under-19 level came in this tournament. He scored a header in a group game tournament fixture against the Republic of Ireland under-19s to equalise 1–1 on 23 July 2011; the Czechs went on to win 2–1. The Czech Republic finished the tournament as losing finalists to Spain.

=== Senior ===
On 29 March 2016, Brabec debuted for the Czech national team under coach Pavel Vrba in Czech Republic senior team in a friendly match against Sweden, ending in a 1–1 draw.

On 11 October 2019, Brabec scored his first goal in a UEFA Euro 2020 qualifying match against England, resulting in a 2–1 victory for the Czechs.

On 19 November 2023, along with Vladimír Coufal and Jan Kuchta, Brabec has been kicked out of the Czech Republic's national team camp after they allegedly going out clubbing two days before the Euro 2024 qualifier match against Moldova.

== Career statistics ==
=== Club ===
As of 26 June 2025

Appearances and goals by club, season and competition
Club	Season	League			Cup		Continental		Other		Total	
Club	Season	Division	Apps	Goals	Apps	Goals	Apps	Goals	Apps	Goals	Apps	Goals
Viktoria Žižkov	2008–09	Czech First League	1	0	—		—		—		1	0
Viktoria Žižkov	2009–10	Czech National Football League	14	0	0	0	—		—		14	0
Viktoria Žižkov	2010–11	Czech National Football League	6	0	0	0	—		—		6	0
Viktoria Žižkov	Total		21	0	0	0	—		—		21	0
Sparta Prague	2011–12	Czech First League	6	0	4	1	—		—		10	1
Sparta Prague	2013–14	Czech First League	18	3	3	0	—		—		21	3
Sparta Prague	2014–15	Czech First League	23	2	3	0	9	1	—		35	3
Sparta Prague	2015–16	Czech First League	22	1	5	0	11	3	—		38	4
Sparta Prague	2016–17	Czech First League	2	0	—		3	1	—		5	1
Sparta Prague	Total		71	6	15	1	23	5	—		109	12
Zbrojovka Brno (loan)	2012–13	Czech First League	18	0	—		—		—		18	0
Genk	2016–17	Belgian First Division A	25	1	2	0	11	1	—		38	2
Genk	2017–18	Belgian First Division A	12	1	2	0	—		—		14	1
Genk	Total		37	2	4	0	11	1	—		52	3
Çaykur Rizespor	2018–19	Süper Lig	17	0	1	0	—		—		18	0
Viktoria Plzeň (loan)	2018–19	Czech First League	10	0	—		—		—		10	0
Viktoria Plzeň	2019–20	Czech First League	32	1	2	0	4	0	—		38	1
Viktoria Plzeň	2020–21	Czech First League	31	3	5	0	3	0	—		39	3
Viktoria Plzeň	2021–22	Czech First League	6	0	—		6	0	—		12	0
Viktoria Plzeň	Total		69	4	7	0	13	0	—		89	4
Aris	2021–22	Super League Greece	35	1	4	0	—		—		39	1
Aris	2022–23	Super League Greece	23	1	4	0	4	0	—		31	1
Aris	2023–24	Super League Greece	32	1	7	0	0	0	—		39	1
Aris	2024–25	Super League Greece	29	3	3	0	—		—		32	3
Aris	Total		119	6	18	0	4	0	—		141	6
Rio Ave	2025–26	Primeira Liga	0	0	0	0	—		—		0	0
Career total			352	18	45	1	51	6	0	0	458	25

=== International ===
Scores and results list the Czech Republic's goal tally first.

No.	Date	Venue	Opponent	Score	Result	Competition
1.	11 October 2019	Sinobo Stadium, Prague, Czech Republic	England	1–1	2–1	UEFA Euro 2020 qualification

== Honours ==
- Czech First League

Winner: 2013–14

- Czech 2. Liga

Runner Up: 2010–11

- Czech Cup

Winner: 2013–14

- UEFA European Under-19 Football Championship

Runner Up: 2011

Individual

- UEFA European Under-19 Championship Team of the Tournament: 2011
- Czech First League Defender of the Year: 2019–20
