= Jean Jules =

Cameroonian footballer (born 1998)

Personal information
- Full name: Jean Jules Sepp Mvondo
- Date of birth: 23 April 1998 (age 28)
- Place of birth: Yaoundé, Cameroon
- Height: 1.77 m (5 ft 10 in)
- Position: Midfielder

Team information
- Current team: Cartagena
- Number: 15

Youth career
- 2014–2016: Aspire Academy
- 2016–2017: Rayo Vallecano

Senior career*
Years	Team	Apps	(Gls)
2016–2018	Rayo Vallecano B	37	(1)
2018–2022	Albacete	31	(1)
2019	→ UCAM Murcia (loan)	9	(0)
2019–2020	→ Rayo Majadahonda (loan)	25	(0)
2021–2022	→ Górnik Zabrze (loan)	16	(0)
2022–2023	Górnik Zabrze	27	(0)
2023–2025	Aris	26	(0)
2026–	Cartagena	10	(0)
- * Club domestic league appearances and goals as of 13:08, 24 May 2026 (UTC)

Jean Jules Sepp Mvondo (born 23 April 1998), known as Jean Jules, is a Cameroonian professional footballer who plays as a midfielder for Spanish Primera Federación club Cartagena.

== Career ==
Born in Yaoundé, Jean Jules joined Rayo Vallecano's youth setup in 2016, from Aspire Academy's Senegal branch. He made his senior debut with the reserves on 27 November of that year, coming on as a late substitute in a 1–1 Tercera División away draw against FC Villanueva del Pardillo.

On 19 November 2017 Jean Jules scored his first senior goal, netting his team's first in a 3–4 away loss against CD Móstoles URJC. The following 9 July, he signed for Albacete Balompié and was initially assigned to the B-side also in the fourth division.

Jean Jules made his professional debut on 17 August 2018, replacing Eugeni in a 1–1 home draw against Deportivo de La Coruña in the Segunda División. The following 15 January, he extended his contract until 2021 and was immediately loaned to Segunda División B side UCAM Murcia CF.

On 12 July 2019, Jean Jules was loaned to freshly relegated side CF Rayo Majadahonda, for one year.

On 1 September 2021, he was loaned out again for one year, this time joining Polish side Górnik Zabrze. On 23 June 2022, he was bought out by Górnik and joined the team permanently on a two-year deal.

On 12 July 2023, Super League Greece club Aris announced the signing of Jean Jules on a three-year contract.

== Career statistics ==
As of match played 23 May 2026

Appearances and goals by club, season and competition
Club	Season	League			National cup (Note: Includes Copa del Rey, Polish Cup, Greek Cup)		Continental		Other		Total	
Club	Season	Division	Apps	Goals	Apps	Goals	Apps	Goals	Apps	Goals	Apps	Goals
Albacete	2018–19	Segunda División	2	0	1	0	—		—		3	0
Albacete	2020–21	Segunda División	28	1	0	0	—		—		28	1
Albacete	2021–22	Segunda División B	1	0	0	0	—		—		1	0
Albacete	Total		31	1	1	0	—		—		32	1
UCAM Murcia (loan)	2018–19	Segunda División B	9	0	—		—		—		9	0
Rayo Majadahonda (loan)	2019–20	Segunda División	25	0	2	0	—		—		27	0
Górnik Zabrze (loan)	2021–22	Ekstraklasa	16	0	4	0	—		—		20	0
Górnik Zabrze	2022–23	Ekstraklasa	27	0	3	0	—		—		30	0
Aris	2023–24	Super League Greece	22	0	3	0	4 (Note: Appearances in UEFA Europa Conference League)	0	—		29	0
Aris	2024–25	Super League Greece	4	0	1	0	—		—		5	0
Aris	Total		26	0	4	0	4	0	—		34	0
Cartagena	2025–26	Primera Federación	10	0	—		—		—		10	0
Career total			144	1	14	0	4	0	0	0	162	1
