= Álvaro Zamora =

Costa Rican footballer (born 2002)

Personal information
- Full name: Álvaro José Zamora Mata
- Date of birth: 9 March 2002 (age 24)
- Place of birth: San José, Costa Rica
- Height: 1.80 m (5 ft 11 in)
- Position: Winger

Team information
- Current team: Académico de Viseu (on loan from Aris)
- Number: 10

Youth career
- –2017: Alajuelense
- 2017–2019: Orlando City
- 2019–2020: Herediano

Senior career*
Years	Team	Apps	(Gls)
2020–2021	Herediano	0	(0)
2020	→ Municipal Grecia (loan)	2	(0)
2021	Pérez Zeledón	4	(0)
2021–2023	Deportivo Saprissa	44	(4)
2023–	Aris	52	(6)
2025–	→ Académico de Viseu (loan)	35	(8)

International career^{‡}
2023–	Costa Rica U23	1	(0)
2022–	Costa Rica	26	(5)
- * Club domestic league appearances and goals as of 20 September 2026 ‡ National team caps and goals as of 23:20, 1 June 2026 (UTC)

Álvaro José Zamora Mata (born 9 March 2002) is a Costa Rican professional footballer who plays as a winger for Primeira Liga club Académico de Viseu, on loan from Super League Greece club Aris, and the Costa Rica national team.

== Club career ==
=== Aris ===
On 9 July 2023, Aris reached an agreement with Deportivo Saprissa for the purchase of 60% of Zamora's rights. Five days later, the Greek club officially announced the signing of Zamora on a five-year contract. On 3 September 2023, he scored his first goal for his new club in a 3–2 home win against Asteras Tripolis.

== International career ==
Zamora made his national team debut for the Costa Rica national team in a friendly against South Korea on 23 September 2022. He came in as a substitute for Gerson Torres at half-time.

He was called up to the final 26-man Costa Rica squad for the 2022 FIFA World Cup in Qatar.

== Career statistics ==
=== Club ===
As of match played 20 September 2026

Appearances and goals by club, season and competition
Club	Season	League			National cup		Continental		Other		Total	
Club	Season	Division	Apps	Goals	Apps	Goals	Apps	Goals	Apps	Goals	Apps	Goals
Municipal Grecia (loan)	2019–20	Liga FPD	2	0	—		—		—		2	0
Pérez Zeledón	2020–21	Liga FPD	4	0	0	0	—		—		4	0
Deportivo Saprissa	2021–22	Liga FPD	2	0	0	0	—		0	0	2	0
Deportivo Saprissa	2022–23	Liga FPD	42	4	0	0	—		—		42	4
Deportivo Saprissa	Total		44	4	0	0	—		0	0	44	4
Aris	2023–24	Super League Greece	32	4	7	0	1 (Note: Appearance in UEFA Conference League)	0	—		40	4
Aris	2024–25	Super League Greece	20	2	2	0	—		—		22	2
Aris	Total		52	6	9	0	1	0	—		62	6
Académico de Viseu (loan)	2025–26	Liga Portugal 2	30	6	3	0	—		—		33	6
Académico de Viseu (loan)	2026–27	Liga Portugal 2	5	0	0	0	—		—		5	0
Académico de Viseu (loan)	Total		35	6	3	0	—		—		38	6
Career total			137	16	12	0	1	0	0	0	150	16

=== International ===
As of match played 1 June 2026

Appearances and goals by national team and year
National team	Year	Apps	Goals
Costa Rica	2022	4	0
Costa Rica	2023	2	0
Costa Rica	2024	10	1
Costa Rica	2025	8	4
Costa Rica	2026	3	0
Total		27	5

Scores and results list Brazil's goal tally first.

List of international goals scored by Álvaro Zamora
No.	Date	Venue	Opponent	Score	Result	Competition
1	8 June 2024	Kirani James Athletic Stadium, St. George's, Grenada	Grenada	2–0	3–0	2026 FIFA World Cup qualifying
2	21 March 2025	FFB Stadium, Belmopan, Belize	Belize	0–5	0–7	2025 CONCACAF Gold Cup qualification
3	21 March 2025	FFB Stadium, Belmopan, Belize	Belize	0–7	0–7	2025 CONCACAF Gold Cup qualification
4	25 March 2025	Estadio Nacional, San José, Costa Rica	Belize	6–1	6–1	2025 CONCACAF Gold Cup qualification
5	7 June 2025	Wildey Turf, Bridgetown, Barbados	Bahamas	0–8	0–8	2026 FIFA World Cup qualifying
