= Fabiano Leismann =

Brazilian footballer (born 1991)

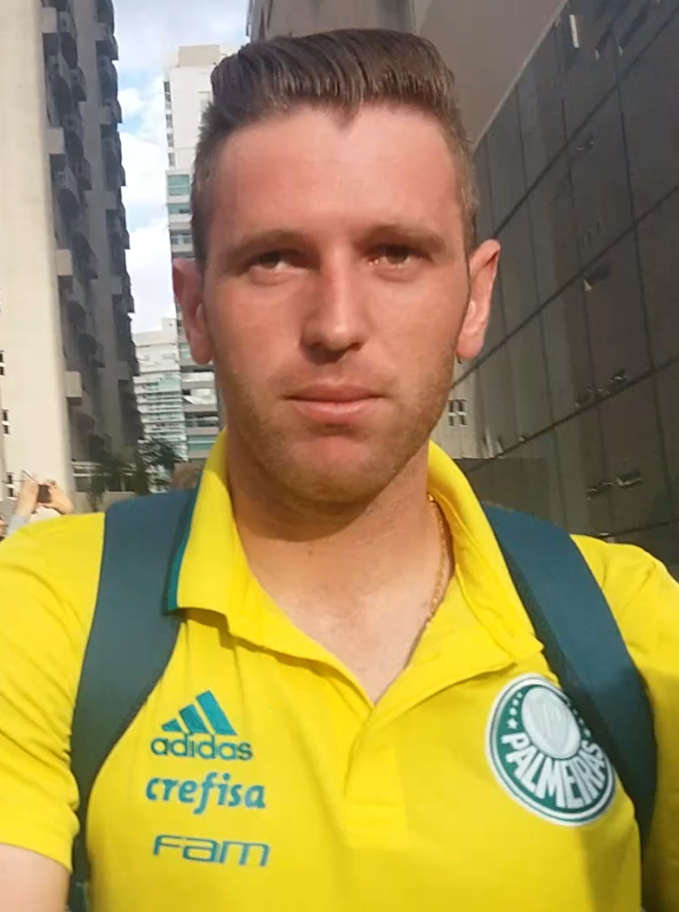
- Leismann with Palmeiras in 2016

Personal information
- Date of birth: 18 November 1991 (age 34)
- Place of birth: São João do Oeste, Brazil
- Height: 1.88 m (6 ft 2 in)
- Position: Centre-back

Team information
- Current team: Aris
- Number: 4

Youth career
- 2008–2009: São Luiz
- 2010–2011: Chapecoense

Senior career*
| Years | Team | Apps | (Gls) |
| 2009–2010 | São Luiz | 15 | (0) |
| 2011–2014 | Chapecoense | 129 | (13) |
| 2015–2016 | Cruzeiro | 28 | (1) |
| 2016 | → Palmeiras (loan) | 7 | (1) |
| 2017–2020 | Palmeiras | 14 | (0) |
| 2018 | → Internacional (loan) | 27 | (0) |
| 2019–2020 | → Boavista (loan) | 27 | (0) |
| 2020–2021 | Denizlispor | 33 | (0) |
| 2021– | Aris | 143 | (14) |
- * Club domestic league appearances and goals as of 26 October 2026

Fabiano Leismann (born 18 November 1991), sometimes known as just Fabiano, is a Brazilian professional footballer who plays for Greek Super League club Aris. A versatile player, he can equally play as either a central defender or as a right-back.

== Career ==
=== Aris ===
On 15 July 2021, Greek Super League club Aris announced the signing of Fabiano Leismann, who signed a three-year contract with the club after successfully passing all the procedural physical and medical examinations he was subjected to.

Not long after the signing of the player, the club included Fabiano Leismann in the list for their first two European matches for the 2021–22 UEFA Europa Conference League, starting from 22 July 2021.

On 19 July 2021, it was made known that the Turkish Football Federation is refusing to send the blue card of the player, reportedly as retaliation for the incident with Galatasaray some days earlier, with the club of Aris asking an intervention by FIFA, because the issue must be solved before the match on Thursday (22 July 2021) so Fabiano to be eligible to play in that match. On the same day, it was also reported FIFA had intervened and asked the Turkish Football Federation to comply and send the blue card.

== Personal life ==
Fabiano Leismann's hometown São João do Oeste's inhabitants are mostly of German descent. His surname ("Leissman") is of German descent, and speaks the language fluently.

== Career statistics ==
As of match played 12 May 2026

Appearances and goals by club, season and competition
| Club | Season | League | | | State league | | National cup (Note: Includes Copa do Brasil, Taça de Portugal, Turkish Cup, Greek Cup) | | Continental | | Other | | Total | |
| Club | Season | Division | Apps | Goals | Apps | Goals | Apps | Goals | Apps | Goals | Apps | Goals | Apps | Goals |
|---|---|---|---|---|---|---|---|---|---|---|---|---|---|---|
| Chapecoense | 2011 | Série C | 2 | 0 | 0 | 0 | 0 | 0 | — | | — | | 2 | 0 |
| Chapecoense | 2012 | Série C | 21 | 1 | 17 (Note: Appearance(s) in Campeonato Catarinense) | 6 | 4 | 1 | — | | — | | 42 | 8 |
| Chapecoense | 2013 | Série B | 25 | 1 | 20 | 1 | 0 | 0 | — | | — | | 45 | 2 |
| Chapecoense | 2014 | Série A | 31 | 0 | 13 | 4 | 2 | 0 | — | | — | | 46 | 4 |
| Chapecoense | Total | | 79 | 2 | 50 | 11 | 6 | 1 | — | | — | | 135 | 14 |
| Cruzeiro | 2015 | Série A | 12 | 1 | 6 (Note: Appearance(s) in Campeonato Mineiro) | 0 | 0 | 0 | 1 (Note: Appearance(s) in Copa Libertadores) | 0 | — | | 19 | 1 |
| Cruzeiro | 2016 | Série A | 0 | 0 | 8 | 0 | 0 | 0 | — | | 2 (Note: Appearance(s) in Primeira Liga) | 0 | 10 | 0 |
| Cruzeiro | Total | | 12 | 1 | 14 | 0 | 0 | 0 | 1 | 0 | 2 | 0 | 29 | 1 |
| Palmeiras (loan) | 2016 | Série A | 7 | 1 | 0 | 0 | 3 | 0 | 0 | 0 | — | | 10 | 1 |
| Palmeiras | 2017 | Série A | 6 | 0 | 7 (Note: Appearance(s) in Campeonato Paulista) | 0 | 3 | 0 | 2 | 1 | — | | 18 | 1 |
| Palmeiras | 2018 | Série A | 0 | 0 | 1 | 0 | 0 | 0 | 0 | 0 | — | | 1 | 0 |
| Palmeiras | 2019 | Série A | 0 | 0 | 0 | 0 | 0 | 0 | 0 | 0 | — | | 0 | 0 |
| Palmeiras | Total | | 6 | 0 | 8 | 0 | 3 | 0 | 2 | 1 | — | | 19 | 1 |
| Internacional (loan) | 2018 | Série A | 25 | 0 | 2 (Note: Appearance(s) in Campeonato Gaúcho) | 0 | 2 | 0 | — | | — | | 29 | 0 |
| Boavista (loan) | 2019–20 | Primeira Liga | 27 | 0 | — | | 1 | 0 | — | | 0 | 0 | 28 | 0 |
| Denizlispor | 2020–21 | Süper Lig | 33 | 0 | — | | 1 | 0 | — | | — | | 34 | 0 |
| Aris | 2021–22 | Super League Greece | 32 | 1 | — | | 4 | 0 | 1 (Note: Appearance(s) in UEFA Europa Conference League) | 0 | — | | 37 | 1 |
| Aris | 2022–23 | Super League Greece | 32 | 3 | — | | 4 | 0 | 4 | 0 | — | | 40 | 3 |
| Aris | 2023–24 | Super League Greece | 27 | 4 | — | | 5 | 0 | 4 | 1 | — | | 36 | 5 |
| Aris | 2024–25 | Super League Greece | 23 | 0 | — | | 2 | 0 | — | | — | | 25 | 0 |
| Aris | 2025–26 | Super League Greece | 21 | 2 | — | | 3 | 0 | 2 | 1 | — | | 26 | 3 |
| Aris | Total | | 135 | 10 | — | | 18 | 0 | 11 | 2 | — | | 164 | 12 |
| Career total | | | 324 | 14 | 74 | 11 | 34 | 1 | 14 | 3 | 2 | 0 | 448 | 29 |

== Honours ==
Individual

- Super League Greece Player of the Month: April 2022
