= Akis Mantzios =

Greek footballer

Personal information
- Full name: Apostolos Mantzios
- Date of birth: 21 October 1969 (age 57)
- Place of birth: Athens, Greece
- Height: 1.83 m (6 ft 0 in)
- Position: Defender

Team information
- Current team: Cyprus (manager)

Senior career*
| Years | Team | Apps | (Gls) |
| 1991–1998 | Panionios | 116 | (3) |
| 1998–2000 | Aris | 40 | (4) |
| 2000–2001 | Ionikos | 21 | (0) |
| 2001–2003 | Panionios | 43 | (4) |
| Total | | 218 | (11) |

Managerial career
- 2008–2009: Chaidari
- 2010: Panionios (caretaker)
- 2011: Thrasyvoulos
- 2011–2012: Panionios
- 2012–2013: Kerkyra
- 2013–2014: Panthrakikos
- 2015–2016: Levadiakos
- 2016–2017: Apollon Smyrnis
- 2018: Levadiakos
- 2018–2019: Panionios
- 2019–2020: Lamia
- 2020–2022: Aris
- 2023: Asteras Tripolis
- 2023–2024: Aris
- 2025–: Cyprus
- * Club domestic league appearances and goals

Apostolos "Akis" Mantzios (Greek: Απόστολος «Άκης» Μάντζιος; born 21 October 1969) is a Greek professional football manager and former player who is currently in charge of the Cyprus national team.

== Playing career ==
When he was 22 years, Mantzios went to Panionios from AO Kifissia. Soon he won a place in the starting lineup of his new club, where he remained for eight consecutive years. Having become club captain under Giannis Kyrastas, Mantzios captained Panionios to victory in the Greek Football Cup in 1998, defeating Panathinaikos in the final. In the summer of 1998, he moved to Aris, and two years later he moved to Ionikos. In the summer of 2001, he returned to Panionios where he ended his career two years later.

== Managerial career ==
He started his managerial career from the youth teams of Panionios. At the season 2008–09, he became the manager of AO Haidari. The following year, he returned to Panionios, as a member of the coaching team. In January 2011, he became the coach of Thrasyvoulos. During the season 2011–12, he was the coach of Panionios and the next season the manager of Kerkyra.

== Career statistics ==
| Seasons | Club | Appearances | Goals |
|---|---|---|---|
| until 1991 | AO Kifissia | Delta Ethniki | |
| 1991–92 | Panionios | 21 | 0 |
| 1992–93 | Panionios | Beta Ethniki | |
| 1993–94 | Panionios | 27 | 0 |
| 1994–95 | Panionios | 22 | 1 |
| 1995–96 | Panionios | 23 | 0 |
| 1996–97 | Panionios | Beta Ethniki | |
| 1997–98 | Panionios | 23 | 2 |
| 1998–99 | Aris Thessaloniki | 26 | 2 |
| 1999–2000 | Aris | 13 | 2 |
| 2000–01 | Ionikos | 21 | 0 |
| 2001–02 | Panionios | 20 | 2 |
| 2002–03 | Panionios | 23 | 2 |

== Managerial statistics ==
As of 7 December 2024

Managerial record by team and tenure
| Team | From | To | Record | | | | | | | |
| Team | From | To | G | W | D | L | GF | GA | GD | Win % |
|---|---|---|---|---|---|---|---|---|---|---|
| Haidari | 1 July 2008 | 2 March 2009 | 28 | 9 | 7 | 12 | 21 | 27 | −6 | 32.14 |
| Panionios (caretaker) | 26 January 2010 | 2 February 2010 | 1 | 0 | 0 | 1 | 0 | 1 | −1 | 0.00 |
| Panionios (caretaker) | 28 October 2010 | 7 November 2010 | 2 | 1 | 0 | 1 | 1 | 5 | −4 | 50.00 |
| Panionios (caretaker) | 16 November 2010 | 9 December 2010 | 3 | 2 | 0 | 1 | 2 | 1 | +1 | 66.67 |
| Thrsyvoulos | 27 January 2011 | 12 May 2011 | 14 | 2 | 4 | 8 | 7 | 13 | −6 | 14.29 |
| Panionios | 24 November 2011 | 30 April 2012 | 23 | 9 | 3 | 11 | 24 | 30 | −6 | 39.13 |
| Kerkyra | 1 July 2012 | 6 February 2013 | 24 | 3 | 9 | 12 | 12 | 29 | −17 | 12.50 |
| Panthrakikos | 9 May 2013 | 5 November 2014 | 46 | 12 | 13 | 21 | 49 | 70 | −21 | 26.09 |
| Levadiakos | 9 February 2015 | 8 April 2016 | 44 | 17 | 10 | 17 | 47 | 51 | −4 | 38.64 |
| Apollon Smyrnis | 29 December 2016 | 25 September 2017 | 33 | 20 | 8 | 5 | 52 | 17 | +35 | 60.61 |
| Levadiakos | 12 May 2018 | 22 October 2018 | 8 | 1 | 0 | 7 | 3 | 13 | −10 | 12.50 |
| Panionios | 4 December 2018 | 2 September 2019 | 25 | 9 | 4 | 12 | 24 | 41 | −17 | 36.00 |
| Lamia | 25 October 2019 | 25 June 2020 | 28 | 9 | 11 | 8 | 28 | 28 | +0 | 32.14 |
| Aris Thessaloniki | 21 September 2020 | 14 February 2022 | 66 | 30 | 17 | 19 | 71 | 53 | +18 | 45.45 |
| Asteras Tripolis | 4 January 2023 | 10 April 2023 | 14 | 3 | 5 | 6 | 10 | 14 | −4 | 21.43 |
| Aris Thessaloniki | 29 August 2023 | 7 December 2024 | 58 | 27 | 14 | 17 | 81 | 64 | +17 | 46.55 |
| Total | | | 417 | 154 | 105 | 158 | 432 | 457 | −25 | 36.93 |

== Honours ==
=== As a player ===
Panionios

- Greek Cup: 1997–98
