= 2022–23 Aris Thessaloniki F.C. season =

Aris Thessaloniki
- Chairman: Theodoros A. Karipidis
- Manager: Germán Burgos (until 30 August 2022); Alan Pardew (until 6 February 2023); Apostolos Terzis
- Stadium: Kleanthis Vikelidis Stadium
- Super League 1: 5th
- Greek Cup: Quarter-finals
- UEFA Europa Conference League: Third qualifying round
- Top goalscorer: League: Luis Palma (11 goals); All: Andre Gray, Luis Palma (13 each)
- Biggest win: PAS Giannina 0–4 Aris Thessaloniki; Aris Thessaloniki 5–0 PAS Lamia
- Biggest defeat: AEK Athens 3–0 Aris Thessaloniki
Home colours	Away colours	Third colours

The 2022–23 season was the 109th season in the existence of Aris Thessaloniki and the club's 5th consecutive season in the top flight of Greek football since their return there. In addition to the Super League 1, Aris participated in this season's editions of the Greek Cup and the UEFA Europa Conference League.

Aris was eliminated in the third qualifying round of the UEFA Europa Conference League by Israeli club Maccabi Tel Aviv.

Germán Burgos, after the elimination from UEFA Europa Conference League and the defeat from Panetolikos in second matchday, sacked and Apostolos Terzis was the caretaker for two matchdays. Before the game against Olympaicos, Alan Pardew was hired as the new manager of Aris Thessaloniki. After the defeat by Ionikos, Alan Pardew was dismissed and Apostolos Terzis took over the club

== First-team squad ==
#	Name	Nationality	Position(s)	Date of birth (age)	Signed from
Goalkeepers
23	Julián Cuesta (captain)	(Spain)	GK	March 28, 1991 (aged 32)	(Poland) Wisła Kraków
70	Giorgos Karakasidis	(Greece)	GK	January 31, 2005 (aged 18)	Club's Academy
99	Marios Siampanis	(Greece)	GK	September 28, 1999 (aged 23)	(Greece) Olympiacos
Defenders
2	Salem Mbakata	(France) / (Democratic Republic of the Congo)	RB	April 19, 1998 (aged 25)	Free Agent
3	Nicolas Nkoulou	(Cameroon)	CB / DM	March 27, 1990 (aged 33)	(England) Watford
4	Fabiano Leismann	(Brazil)	CB / RB	November 18, 1991 (aged 31)	(Turkey) Denizlispor
14	Jakub Brabec (vice-captain)	(Czech Republic)	CB	August 6, 1992 (aged 30)	(Czech Republic) Viktoria Plzeň
18	Bradley Mazikou	(Republic of the Congo) / (France)	LB / LM	June 2, 1996 (aged 26)	(Bulgaria) CSKA Sofia
22	Moses Odubajo	(England) / (Nigeria)	RB / RM / LB	June 2, 1996 (aged 26)	(England) Queens Park Rangers
25	Christos Marmaridis	(Greece)	RB	May 25, 2002 (aged 21)	Club's Academy
43	Marvin Peersman	(Belgium) / (Ghana)	LB / CB / LM	February 10, 1991 (aged 32)	(Greece) PAS Giannina
50	Konstantinos Tanoulis	(Greece)	CB	March 7, 2005 (aged 18)	Club's Academy
Midfielders
5	Lukas Rupp	(Germany)	CM / AM	January 8, 1991 (aged 32)	Free Agent
6	Bryan Dabo	(Burkina Faso) / (France)	CM / DM	February 18, 1992 (aged 31)	(Turkey) Çaykur Rizespor
8	Cheick Doukouré	(Ivory Coast) / (France)	DM / CM	September 11, 1992 (aged 30)	(Spain) Leganés
13	Peter Etebo	(Nigeria) / (England)	CM / RM / LM	November 9, 1995 (aged 27)	(England) Stoke City
16	Vladimír Darida	(Czech Republic)	CM / AM / DM	August 8, 1990 (aged 32)	(Germany) Hertha BSC
19	Manu García	(Spain)	AM / CM	January 2, 1998 (aged 25)	(Spain) Sporting Gijón
77	Michalis Panagidis	(Greece)	CM / DM / AM	February 11, 2004 (aged 19)	Club's Academy
88	Rafail Sgouros	(Greece)	CM / DM	May 28, 2004 (aged 19)	Club's Academy
Forwards
7	Lazaros Christodoulopoulos	(Greece)	LW / SS / AM	December 19, 1986 (aged 36)	Free Agent
9	Andre Gray	(Jamaica) / (England)	ST / LW	June 26, 1991 (aged 31)	(England) Watford
10	Mateo García	(Argentina) / (Italy)	RW / LW	September 10, 1996 (aged 26)	(Serbia) Red Star Belgrade
11	Juan Iturbe	(Paraguay) / (Argentina)	LW / RW / SS	June 4, 1993 (aged 29)	(Mexico) UNAM Pumas
17	Luis Palma	(Honduras)	LW / ST / AM	January 17, 2000 (aged 23)	(Honduras) Vida
20	Izet Hajrović	(Bosnia and Herzegovina) / (Switzerland)	LW / RW / AM	August 4, 1991 (aged 31)	(Croatia) Dinamo Zagreb
21	Christos Chatziioannou	(Greece)	ST	January 10, 2004 (aged 19)	Club's Academy
27	Gervinho	(Ivory Coast)	LW / RW / ST	May 27, 1987 (aged 36)	(Turkey) Trabzonspor
47	Aboubakar Kamara	(Mauritania) / (France)	ST / RW / LW	March 7, 1995 (aged 28)	(Greece) Olympiacos
64	Rafael Camacho	(Portugal) / (Angola)	RW / LW / AM	May 22, 2000 (aged 23)	(Portugal) Sporting CP

== Transfers and loans ==
=== Transfers in ===
Entry date	Position	No.	Player	From club	Fee	Ref.
June 2022	DF	43	(Belgium) / (Ghana) Marvin Peersman	(Greece) PAS Giannina	Free	
June 2022	MF	24	(Senegal) / (Spain) Pape Cheikh Diop	(France) Olympique Lyonnais	Free	
July 2022	FW	9	(Jamaica) / (England) Andre Gray	(England) Watford	Free	
July 2022	DF	18	(Republic of the Congo) / (France) Bradley Mazikou	(Bulgaria) CSKA Sofia	Free	
July 2022	MF	6	(Burkina Faso) / (France) Bryan Dabo	(Turkey) Çaykur Rizespor	Free	
July 2022	DF	22	(England) / (Nigeria) Moses Odubajo	(England) Queens Park Rangers	Free	
July 2022	FW	27	(Ivory Coast) Gervinho	(Turkey) Trabzonspor	Free	
July 2022	MF	19	(Spain) Manu García	(Spain) Sporting Gijón	3.200.000 €	
August 2022	DF	3	(Cameroon) Nicolas Nkoulou	(England) Watford	Free	
January 2023	MF	16	(Czech Republic) Vladimír Darida	(Germany) Hertha BSC	Free	
January 2023	MF	5	(Germany) Lukas Rupp	Free Agent	Free	
February 2023	FW	7	(Greece) Lazaros Christodoulopoulos	Free Agent	Free	

=== Transfers out ===
Exit date	Position	No.	Player	To club	Fee	Ref.
June 2022	DF	22	(Romania) / (Spain) Cristian Ganea	(Greece) Panathinaikos	Released	
June 2022	FW	9	(Greece) Dimitrios Manos	(Turkey) Bandırmaspor	Released	
June 2022	MF	88	(Brazil) / (Italy) Lucas Sasha	(Brazil) Fortaleza	Released	
June 2022	DF	21	(Sweden) Daniel Sundgren	(Israel) Maccabi Haifa	Released	
June 2022	MF	17	(Senegal) Badou Ndiaye	(Turkey) Adana Demirspor	Released	
June 2022	FW	47	(Mauritania) / (France) Aboubakar Kamara	(Greece) Olympiacos	€5.000.000	
June 2022	DF	3	(Ghana) Lumor Agbenyenu	Free Agent	Released	
June 2022	DF	34	(North Macedonia) Ali Adem	(North Macedonia) Shkupi	Released	
June 2022	DF	5	(Greece) Giorgos Delizisis	Free Agent	Released	
June 2022	DF	29	(Tunisia) / (France) Yohan Benalouane	Free Agent	Released	
June 2022	DF	66	(Austria) Emanuel Šakić	Free Agent	Released	
June 2022	MF	8	(Netherlands) / (Cape Verde) Lerin Duarte	Free Agent	Released	
June 2022	MF	26	(Spain) Javier Matilla	Free Agent	Released	
June 2022	FW	11	(Greece) Kostas Mitroglou	Free Agent	Released	
June 2022	FW	16	(Portugal) Bruno Gama	Free Agent	Released	
June 2022	FW	18	(Argentina) / (Italy) Facundo Bertoglio	Free Agent	Released	
June 2022	FW	19	(Spain) Cristian López	Free Agent	Released	
July 2022	DF	31	(Greece) Panagiotis Tsagalidis	(Greece) Panserraikos	Released	
July 2022	DF	27	(Greece) Panagiotis Sengiergis	Free Agent	Released	
July 2022	DF	44	(Greece) Kyriakos Aslanidis	Free Agent	Released	
August 2022	GK	1	(Brazil) Denis César	(Brazil) Sport Recife	Released	
August 2022	MF	35	(Greece) Zisis Saliaris	(Greece) Thermaikos	Released	
December 2022	MF	24	(Senegal) / (Spain) Pape Cheikh Diop	Free Agent	Released	
January 2023	FW	7	(Argentina) / (Italy) Daniel Mancini	(Greece) Panathinaikos	3.000.000 €	

=== Loans in ===
Start date	End date	Position	No.	Player	From club	Fee	Ref.
July 2022	June 2023	FW	64	(Portugal) / (Angola) Rafael Camacho	(Portugal) Sporting CP	None	
September 2022	January 2023	FW	15	(Honduras) Edwin Rodríguez	(Honduras) Olimpia	None	
September 2022	June 2023	MF	13	(Nigeria) Peter Etebo	(England) Stoke City	None	
January 2023	June 2023	FW	47	(Mauritania) / (France) Aboubakar Kamara	(Greece) Olympiacos	None	

=== Transfer summary ===
Spending

Summer: ▼3.200.000 €

Winter: 0 €

Total: ▼3.200.000 €

Income

Summer: ▲5.000.000 €

Winter: ▲3.000.000 €

Total: ▲8.000.000 €

Net Expenditure

Summer: ▲1.800.000 €

Winter: ▲3.000.000 €

Total: ▲4.800.000 €

== Pre-season friendlies ==
1 July 2022 Friendly	Hamburger SV	4 – 3	Aris Thessaloniki	Söchau
18:30	Robert Glatzel 8'; Marvin Peersman 22' (o.g.); Robin Meißner 58'; Xavier Amaechi 59'	(in Greek)	Juan Iturbe 4'; Daniel Mancini 11'; Marvin Peersman 35'	Stadium: Venue Kräuterdorfstadion Söchau

4 July 2022 Friendly	Gent	0 – 1	Aris Thessaloniki	Söchau
16:00		(in Greek)	Mateo García 36' (pen.)	Stadium: Venue Kräuterdorfstadion Söchau

7 July 2022 Friendly	Aris Limassol	1 – 0	Aris Thessaloniki	Gornja Radgona
18:30	Daniel Sikorski 77'	(in Greek)		Stadium: Gornja Radgona Stadium

11 July 2022 Friendly	Aris Thessaloniki	2 – 1	Olympiacos	Thessaloniki
21:00	Rafael Camacho 74'; Christos Chatziioannou 75'	(in Greek)	Tiquinho Soares 80'	Stadium: Kleanthis Vikelidis Stadium

14 July 2022 Friendly	Aris Thessaloniki	2 – 0	Ionikos	Thessaloniki
21:00	Georgios Servilakis 60' (o.g.); Izet Hajrović 70'	(in Greek)		Stadium: Kleanthis Vikelidis Stadium

== Competitions ==
=== Overall ===
Competition	Started round	Current position / round	Final position / round	First match	Last match
Super League 1	Matchday 1	—	5th	21 August 2022	14 May 2023
Regular Season	Matchday 1	—	5th	21 August 2022	12 March 2023
Play-off / Play-out Round	Matchday 1	—	5th	19 March 2023	14 May 2023
Greek Cup	Round of 16	—	Quarter-finals	15 December 2022	25 January 2023
UECL	Second qualifying round	—	Third qualifying round	21 July 2022	11 August 2022

Updated to match played 14 May 2023
Source: Competitions

=== Overview ===
Competition	Record							
Competition	G	W	D	L	GF	GA	GD	Win %
Super League 1	36	15	6	15	55	41	+14	41.67
Greek Cup	4	2	0	2	3	3	+0	50.00
UECL	4	3	0	1	9	5	+4	75.00
Total	44	20	6	18	67	49	+18	45.45

Updated to match played 14 May 2023
Source: Competitions

Super League 1	Record							
Super League 1	G	W	D	L	GF	GA	GD	Win %
Regular Season	26	12	4	10	38	24	+14	46.15
Play-off Round	10	3	2	5	17	17	+0	30.00
Total	36	15	6	15	55	41	+14	41.67

Updated to match played 14 May 2023
Source: Competitions

==== Managers' Overview ====
===== Germán Burgos =====
Competition	Record							
Competition	G	W	D	L	GF	GA	GD	Win %
Super League 1	2	1	0	1	4	3	+1	50.00
Greek Cup	0	0	0	0	0	0	+0	—
UECL	4	3	0	1	9	5	+4	75.00
Total	6	4	0	2	13	8	+5	66.67

Updated to match played 28 August 2022
Source: Competitions

===== Apostolos Terzis =====
Competition	Record							
Competition	G	W	D	L	GF	GA	GD	Win %
Super League 1	2	1	1	0	2	0	+2	50.00
Greek Cup	0	0	0	0	0	0	+0	—
UECL	0	0	0	0	0	0	+0	—
Total	2	1	1	0	2	0	+2	50.00

Updated to match played 11 September 2022
Source: Competitions

===== Alan Pardew =====
Competition	Record							
Competition	G	W	D	L	GF	GA	GD	Win %
Super League 1	15	7	3	5	22	11	+11	46.67
Greek Cup	4	2	0	2	3	3	+0	50.00
UECL	0	0	0	0	0	0	+0	—
Total	19	9	3	7	25	14	+11	47.37

Updated to match played 25 January 2023
Source: Competitions

=== Super League 1 ===
==== Regular season ====
===== League table =====
Pos	Team	Pld	W	D	L	GF	GA	GD	Pts	Qualification or relegation
3	Olympiacos	26	16	8	2	53	14	+39	56	Qualification for the Play-off round
4	PAOK	26	15	9	2	43	15	+28	54	Qualification for the Play-off round
5	Aris	26	12	4	10	38	24	+14	40	Qualification for the Play-off round
6	Volos	26	11	6	9	31	38	−7	39	Qualification for the Play-off round
7	Panetolikos	26	7	8	11	26	38	−12	29 (Note: Head to head points: Panetolikos 4, Atromitos 1)	Qualification for the Play-out round

Source: Super League Greece
Rules for classification: 1) Points; 2) Head-to-head points; 3) Head-to-head goal difference; 4) Goal difference; 5) Goals scored; 6) Play-offs (neutral ground).
(Note: Criterion 6 is only used if needed to decide champion, teams for relegation or teams for UEFA competitions).

===== Results summary =====
Overall								Home						Away					
Pld	W	D	L	GF	GA	GD	Pts	W	D	L	GF	GA	GD	W	D	L	GF	GA	GD
26	12	4	10	38	24	+14	40	9	2	2	26	9	+17	3	2	8	12	15	−3

Last updated: 12 March 2023.
Source: Super League Greece

===== Results by matchday =====
Matchday	1	2	3	4	5	6	7	8	9	10	11	12	13	14	15	16	17	18	19	20	21	22	23	24	25	26
Ground	H	A	H	A	H	A	H	H	A	H	A	H	A	A	H	A	H	A	H	A	A	H	A	H	A	H
Result	W	L	D	W	W	L	L	W	L	D	D	W	W	D	W	L	W	L	W	L	L	L	W	W	L	W
Position	2	6	6	5	3	7	8	6	6	6	6	6	6	6	5	6	5	6	5	5	6	6	6	5	6	5

Updated to match(es) played on 12 March 2023. Source: Super League Greece
A = Away; H = Home; W = Win; D = Draw; L = Loss; P = Postponed

===== Matches =====
21 August 2022 1	Aris Thessaloniki	3 – 0	Levadiakos	Thessaloniki
20:30 EET	Daniel Mancini 12', 45+1'; Andre Gray 68'; Cheick Doukouré (yellow card) 75'	Report	Dimitris Konstantinidis (yellow card) 29'; Anthony Belmonte (yellow card) 50'; Panagiotis Symelidis (yellow card) 72'	Stadium: Kleanthis Vikelidis Stadium; Attendance: 7.353; Referee: Georgios Tzovaras

28 August 2022 2	Panetolikos	3 – 1	Aris Thessaloniki	Agrinio
19:00 EET	Levan Shengelia 15'; Jorge Díaz (yellow card) 28' (yellow-red card) 90+3'; Nikos Karelis 63'; Nadrey Dago 76'	Report	Luis Palma 20'; Cheick Doukouré (yellow card) 37'	Stadium: Panetolikos Stadium; Attendance: 1.719; Referee: Anastasios Papapetrou

4 September 2022 3	Aris Thessaloniki	0 – 0	PAOK	Thessaloniki
21:30 EET	Pape Cheikh Diop (yellow card) 16'; Cheick Doukouré (yellow card) 71'; Bryan Dabo (yellow card) 75' (yellow-red card) 90+6'	Report	Marios Tsaousis (yellow card) 22'; Sverrir Ingi Ingason (yellow card) 90+2'; Jasmin Kurtić (yellow card) 90+3'; Omar El Kaddouri (red card) 90+6'	Stadium: Kleanthis Vikelidis Stadium; Attendance: 12.565; Referee: Miguel Godinho (Portugal)

11 September 2022 4	Asteras Tripolis	0 – 2	Aris Thessaloniki	Tripoli
21:30 EET	Pepe Castaño (yellow card) 90+5'	Report	Fabiano Leismann (yellow card) 10'; Andre Gray 20'; Jakub Brabec (yellow card) 55'; Salem M'Bakata 60'; Mateo García (red card) 77'	Stadium: Theodoros Kolokotronis Stadium; Attendance: 827; Referee: Konstantinos Tsetsilas

18 September 2022 5	Aris Thessaloniki	2 – 1	Olympiacos	Thessaloniki
20:00 EET	Bradley Mazikou (yellow card) 45+1'; Daniel Mancini 76', (yellow card) 83'; Luis Palma 80'; Bryan Dabo (yellow card) 87'	Report	Georgios Masouras 15'; Jakub Brabec (yellow card) 55'	Stadium: Kleanthis Vikelidis Stadium; Attendance: 9.589; Referee: Tamás Bognár (Hungary)

2 October 2022 6	Volos	2 – 0	Aris Thessaloniki	Volos
19:30 EET	Abdul Rahman Weiss (yellow card) 13'; Miloš Deletić 26', (yellow card) 45+1'; Jean Barrientos 30' (pen.), (yellow card) 37'; Anastasios Tsokanis (yellow card) 36'; Nikolai Alho (red card) 55'; Antonio Luna (yellow card) 85'	Report	Diop (yellow card) 36'; Juan Iturbe (yellow card) 42'; Fabiano Leismann (yellow card) 84'	Stadium: Panthessaliko Stadium; Attendance: 2.237; Referee: Christos Vergetis

9 October 2022 7	Aris Thessaloniki	0 – 2	AEK Athens	Thessaloniki
21:15 EET	Bryan Dabo (yellow card) 73'	Report	Harold Moukoudi (yellow card) 6'; Damian Szymański 28'; Levi García 50'; Sergio Araujo (yellow card) 54'; Georgios Athanasiadis (yellow card) 81'	Stadium: Kleanthis Vikelidis Stadium; Attendance: 11.846; Referee: Gustavo Correia (Portugal)

15 October 2022 8	Aris Thessaloniki	2 – 1	Ionikos	Thessaloniki
20:30 EET	Gervinho 62'; Fabiano Leismann (yellow card) 66'; Andre Gray 73'	Report	Vasilios Mantzis 42'; Emanuel Šakić (yellow card) 45'; Aias Aosman (yellow card) 45+3'	Stadium: Kleanthis Vikelidis Stadium; Attendance: 6.739; Referee: Anastasios Papapetrou

23 October 2022 9	Panathinaikos	1 – 0	Aris Thessaloniki	Athens
21:30 EET	Bart Schenkeveld (yellow card) 59'; Rubén Pérez (yellow card) 64'; Brignoli (yellow card) 65'; Andraž Šporar 90+2', (yellow card) 90+2'	Report	Mateo García (yellow card) 25'; Peter Etebo (yellow card) 57'; Juan Iturbe (yellow card) 59'; Julián Cuesta (yellow card) 84'; Moses Odubajo (yellow card) 90+1'; Luis Palma (red card) 90+6'	Stadium: Leoforos Alexandras Stadium; Attendance: 12.917; Referee: Nikola Dabanović (Montenegro)

30 October 2022 10	Aris Thessaloniki	1 – 1	OFI	Thessaloniki
20:30 EET	Andre Gray 56'	Report	Assane Dioussé (yellow card) 40'; Jon Toral (yellow card) 42', (goal) 49'; Paschalis Staikos (yellow card) 79'; Konstantinos Balogiannis (yellow card) 81'; Mesaque Djú (yellow card) 88'	Stadium: Kleanthis Vikelidis Stadium; Attendance: 7.006; Referee: Georgios Tzovaras

5 November 2022 11	Atromitos	0 – 0	Aris Thessaloniki	Peristeri
19:00 EET	Eder González (yellow card) 20'; Andreas Kuen (yellow card) 43'; Juan Muñiz (yellow card) 90'	Report	Daniel Mancini (yellow card) 29'; Fabiano Leismann (yellow card) 56'; Manu García (yellow card) 87'	Stadium: Peristeri Stadium; Attendance: 2.263; Referee: Spyridon Zabalas

8 November 2022 12	Aris Thessaloniki	5 – 0	Lamia	Thessaloniki
20:00 EET	Fabiano Leismann 17'; Luis Palma 33', 36', 58'; Juan Iturbe (yellow card) 89'; Andre Gray 90+1'	Report	Danny Bejarano (yellow card) 20', (red card) 20'	Stadium: Kleanthis Vikelidis Stadium; Attendance: 4.837; Referee: Anastasios Sidiropoulos

13 November 2022 13	PAS Giannina	0 – 4	Aris Thessaloniki	Ioannina
16:00 EET	Rodrigo Erramuspe (yellow card) 20'	Report	Fabiano Leismann (yellow card) 9', (goal) 60' (pen.); Salem M'Bakata (yellow card) 67'; Nicolas Nkoulou 79'; Moses Odubajo 81'; Peter Etebo (yellow card) 90'; Luis Palma 90+3'	Stadium: Zosimades Stadium; Attendance: 1.955; Referee: Dimitrios Maloutas

21 December 2022 14	Levadiakos	1 – 1	Aris Thessaloniki	Livadeia
15:00 EET	Stephen Hammond 38'; Konstantinos Doumtsios (yellow card) 85'	Report	Moses Odubajo (yellow card) 60'; Luis Palma 64'; Mateo García (yellow card) 85'	Stadium: Levadia Municipal Stadium; Attendance: 669; Referee: Anastasios Papapetrou

29 December 2022 15	Aris Thessaloniki	1 – 0	Panetolikos	Thessaloniki
18:00 EET	Andre Gray 52'; Peter Etebo (yellow card) 86'	Report	Dimitris Kolovos (yellow card) 27'; Deiby Flores (yellow card) 45'; Johan Mårtensson (yellow card) 68'; Nikos Karelis (yellow card) 90'	Stadium: Kleanthis Vikelidis Stadium; Attendance: 7.440; Referee: Spyridon Zabalas

4 January 2023 16	PAOK	1 – 0	Aris Thessaloniki	Thessaloniki
20:00 EET	Douglas Augusto (yellow card) 30'; Andrija Živković (yellow card) 36'; Sverrir Ingi Ingason 45+1'; Dominik Kotarski (yellow card) 90'; Stefan Schwab (yellow card) 90+5'	Report	Marvin Peersman (yellow card) 45+4'	Stadium: Toumba Stadium; Attendance: 20.756; Referee: Tamás Bognár (Hungary)

8 January 2023 17	Aris Thessaloniki	3 – 0	Asteras Tripolis	Thessaloniki
19:00 EET	Manu García 19'; Fabiano Leismann 32'; Rafael Camacho 90'	Report	Matías Iglesias (yellow card) 90+3'	Stadium: Kleanthis Vikelidis Stadium; Attendance: 7.010; Referee: Athanassios Tzilos

15 January 2023 18	Olympiacos	1 – 0	Aris Thessaloniki	Piraeus
19:30 EET	Hwang In-beom (yellow card) 37'; Georgios Masouras 46'; Oleg Reabciuk (yellow card) 90+1'	Report	Moses Odubajo (yellow card) 38'; Fabiano Leismann (yellow card) 85'	Stadium: Karaiskakis Stadium; Attendance: 24.753; Referee: Roi Reinshreiber (Israel)

21 January 2023 19	Aris Thessaloniki	3 – 0	Volos	Thessaloniki
20:00 EET	Manu García 47', 60', 74'	Report	Miloš Deletić (yellow card) 18'; Enzo Gaggi (yellow card) 60'	Stadium: Kleanthis Vikelidis Stadium; Attendance: 6.872; Referee: Konstantinos Katikos

29 January 2023 20	AEK Athens	3 – 0	Aris Thessaloniki	Athens
19:30 EET	Nordin Amrabat 18' (pen.), (yellow card) 32'; Ehsan Hajsafi (yellow card) 41'; Damian Szymański (yellow card) 51'; Mijat Gaćinović 76'; Harold Moukoudi (yellow card) 84'; Orbelín Pineda 89'	Report	Fabiano Leismann (yellow card) 22'; Marvin Peersman (yellow card) 30'; Peter Etebo (yellow card) 46' (yellow-red card) 60'; Bryan Dabo (yellow card) 78'	Stadium: Agia Sophia Stadium; Attendance: 30.483; Referee: Luís Godinho (Portugal)

4 February 2023 21	Ionikos	1 – 0	Aris Thessaloniki	Piraeus
19:00 EET	Maximiliano Lovera 59' (pen.); Vasilios Mantzis (yellow card) 62'; Sebá (yellow card) 68'	Report	Julián Cuesta (yellow card) 61'; Aboubakar Kamara (yellow card) 90'	Stadium: Neapoli Stadium; Attendance: 676; Referee: Georgios Tzovaras

12 February 2023 22	Aris Thessaloniki	1 – 2	Panathinaikos	Thessaloniki
20:00 EET	Moses Odubajo 10'	Report	Daniel Mancini 36'; Zvonimir Šarlija (yellow card) 84'; Sebastián Palacios 86'	Stadium: Kleanthis Vikelidis Stadium; Attendance: 7.291; Referee: Mads Kristoffer Kristoffersen (Denmark)

20 February 2023 23	OFI	0 – 3	Aris Thessaloniki	Heraklion
19:30 EET		Report	Lukas Rupp 10'; Moses Odubajo (yellow card) 26'; Vladimír Darida 30'; Juan Iturbe 90'	Stadium: Theodoros Vardinogiannis Stadium; Attendance: 4.756; Referee: Dimitrios Karantonis

26 February 2023 24	Aris Thessaloniki	2 – 1	Atromitos	Thessaloniki
19:30 EET	Vladimír Darida 8'; Mateo García (yellow card) 17', (goal) 27'; Peter Etebo (yellow card) 20'	Report	Aguibou Camara (yellow card) 23'; Dimitrios Chatziisaias (yellow card) 44'; Gaëtan Robail 80'; Georgios Tzovaras (yellow card) 90+2'	Stadium: Kleanthis Vikelidis Stadium; Attendance: 6.285; Referee: Spyridon Zabalas

5 March 2023 25	Lamia	2 – 1	Aris Thessaloniki	Lamia
19:30 EET	Vykintas Slivka 15'; Nikos Vergos 26'; Theofanis Tzandaris (yellow card) 30'; Athanasios Garavelis (yellow card) 90+2'	Report	Nicolas Nkoulou (yellow card) 25'; Moses Odubajo (yellow card) 34'; Jakub Brabec 44', (yellow card) 84'; Andre Gray (yellow card) 90+3'	Stadium: Lamia Municipal Stadium; Attendance: 1.065; Referee: Evangelos Manouhos

12 March 2023 26	Aris Thessaloniki	3 – 1	PAS Giannina	Thessaloniki
19:00 EET	Vladimír Darida 26'; Mateo García 43'; Marvin Peersman (yellow card) 45'; Aboubakar Kamara 58'	Report	Angelos Liasos 7'; Carles Soria (yellow card) 41'	Stadium: Kleanthis Vikelidis Stadium; Attendance: 5.769; Referee: Konstantinos Katikos

==== Play-off Round ====
===== League table =====
Pos	Team	Pld	W	D	L	GF	GA	GD	Pts	Qualification
1	AEK Athens (C)	36	26	5	5	69	17	+52	83	Qualification for the UCL third qualifying round
2	Panathinaikos	36	23	9	4	47	16	+31	78	Qualification for the UCL second qualifying round
3	Olympiacos	36	21	10	5	70	24	+46	73	Qualification for the UEL third qualifying round
4	PAOK	36	19	10	7	57	32	+25	67	Qualification for the UECL second qualifying round
5	Aris Thessaloniki	36	15	6	15	55	41	+14	51	Qualification for the UECL second qualifying round
6	Volos	36	11	7	18	35	66	−31	40	

Updated to match(es) played on 14 May 2023. Source: Super League Greece
(C) Champions

===== Results summary =====
Overall								Home						Away					
Pld	W	D	L	GF	GA	GD	Pts	W	D	L	GF	GA	GD	W	D	L	GF	GA	GD
36	15	6	15	55	41	+14	51	11	2	5	34	17	+17	4	4	10	21	24	−3

Last updated: 14 May 2023.
Source: Super League

===== Results by matchday =====
Matchday	1	2	3	4	5	6	7	8	9	10
Ground	H	A	H	A	A	H	A	H	H	A
Result	L	D	L	L	W	W	L	W	L	D
Position	5	5	5	5	5	5	5	5	5	5

Updated to match(es) played on 14 May 2023. Source: Super League
A = Away; H = Home; W = Win; D = Draw; L = Loss; P = Postponed

===== Matches =====
19 March 2023 1	Aris Thessaloniki	1 – 2	PAOK	Thessaloniki
19:00 EEST	Luis Palma 12'; Moses Odubajo (yellow card) 51'; Aboubakar Kamara (yellow card) 72'; Fabiano Leismann (yellow card) 82'	Report	Stefan Schwab (yellow card) 47', (goal) 68' (pen.); Andrija Živković 74'; Giannis Konstantelias (yellow card) 89'; Giannis Kargas (yellow card) 90'	Stadium: Kleanthis Vikelidis Stadium; Attendance: 11.165; Referee: Mohammed Al-Hakim (Sweden)

2 April 2023 2	Olympiacos	2 – 2	Aris Thessaloniki	Piraeus
21:00 EET	Hwang In-beom 36'; Sokratis Papastathopoulos 52'	Report	Andre Gray (yellow card) 58'; Juan Iturbe 70'; Rafael Camacho 81', (yellow card) 86'	Stadium: Karaiskakis Stadium; Attendance: 20.626; Referee: Fábio Veríssimo (Portugal)

5 April 2023 3	Aris Thessaloniki	0 – 1	Panathinaikos	Thessaloniki
19:30 EEST	Moses Odubajo (yellow card) 26'; Aboubakar Kamara (yellow card) 62' (yellow-red card) 90+2'; Fabiano Leismann (yellow card) 89'; Rafael Camacho (yellow card) 77'	Report	Facundo Sánchez (yellow card) 12'; Zvonimir Šarlija (yellow card) 62'; Andraž Šporar 69'; Juankar (yellow card) 76'	Stadium: Kleanthis Vikelidis Stadium; Attendance: 7.010; Referee: Tamás Bognár (Hungary)

9 April 2023 4	AEK Athens	3 – 1	Aris Thessaloniki	Athens
18:00 EET	Mijat Gaćinović (yellow card) 20'; Levi García 36' (pen.); Steven Zuber 82', 90+5'; Lazaros Rota (yellow card) 86'; Paolo Fernandes (yellow card) 86'; Petros Mantalos (yellow card) 90+3'; Georgios Tzavellas (yellow card) 90+3'	Report	Peter Etebo (yellow card) 24'; Juan Iturbe (yellow card) 38', (goal) 45+1'; Rafael Camacho (yellow card) 86'; Bryan Dabo (yellow card) 86'; Lazaros Christodoulopoulos (yellow card) 90+3'	Stadium: Agia Sophia Stadium; Attendance: 30.380; Referee: Aristotelis Diamantopoulos

23 April 2023 5	Volos	0 – 3	Aris Thessaloniki	Volos
17:30 EET	Antonio Luna (yellow card) 59'	Report	Vladimír Darida 27', (yellow card) 73'; Aboubakar Kamara 77', 80' (pen.)	Stadium: Panthessaliko Stadium; Attendance: 597; Referee: Angelos Evangelou

26 April 2023 6	Aris Thessaloniki	2 – 1	Olympiacos	Thessaloniki
19:00 EET	Aboubakar Kamara (yellow card) 15'; Luis Palma 36'; Cheick Doukouré (yellow card) 48'; Marvin Peersman (yellow card) 59'; Bryan Dabo 65', (yellow card) 66'	Report	Georgios Masouras (yellow card) 43'; Oleg Reabciuk (yellow card) 54'; Cédric Bakambu 70' (pen.); Thanasis Androutsos (yellow card) 90+2'	Stadium: Kleanthis Vikelidis Stadium; Attendance: 4.867; Referee: Danny Makkelie (Netherlands)

30 April 2023 7	PAOK	3 – 2	Aris Thessaloniki	Thessaloniki
20:00 EET	Taison 56', (yellow card) 90+3'; Stefan Schwab 62' (pen.), (yellow card) 64'; Brandon Thomas (yellow card) 64'; Joan Sastre (yellow card) 73'; Andrija Živković 78', (yellow card) 79'	Report	Aboubakar Kamara 45', (yellow card) 64' (yellow-red card) 90+3'; Vladimír Darida 70'; Bradley Mazikou (yellow card) 73'	Stadium: Toumba Stadium; Attendance: 8.905; Referee: Aliyar Aghayev (Azerbaijan)

3 May 2023 8	Aris Thessaloniki	4 – 2	Volos	Thessaloniki
20:00 EET	Luis Palma 3', 44' (pen.); Bradley Mazikou (yellow card) 25'; Andre Gray (yellow card) 33', (goal) 56'; Mateo García 74'; Lazaros Christodoulopoulos (yellow card) 90+3'	Report	Enzo Gaggi (yellow card) 48'; Stathis Tachatos 50', (yellow card) 62'; Nikolai Alho 59'; Miloš Deletić (red card) 64'; Antonio Luna (yellow card) 75'	Stadium: Kleanthis Vikelidis Stadium; Attendance: 2.814; Referee: Petros Tsagarakis

8 May 2023 9	Aris Thessaloniki	1 – 2	AEK Athens	Thessaloniki
21:00 EET	Andre Gray 17' (pen.); Lazaros Christodoulopoulos (yellow card) 45+1'; Vladimír Darida (yellow card) 88'; Aboubakar Kamara (yellow card) 90'	Report	Tom van Weert 23'; Steven Zuber 43', (yellow card) 64'; Petros Mantalos (yellow card) 72'; Lazaros Rota (yellow card) 90+1'	Stadium: Kleanthis Vikelidis Stadium; Attendance: 7.620; Referee: Vassilios Fotias

14 May 2023 10	Panathinaikos	1 – 1	Aris Thessaloniki	Athens
20:00 EET	László Kleinheisler 6'; Zvonimir Šarlija (yellow card) 37'	Report	Juan Iturbe 29'; Andre Gray (yellow card) 32'; Luis Palma (yellow card) 80'; Vladimír Darida (yellow card) 89'	Stadium: Leoforos Alexandras Stadium; Attendance: 12.710; Referee: Athanassios Tzilos

=== Greek Football Cup ===
==== Round of 16 ====
15 December 2022 First leg	Levadiakos	1 – 2	Aris Thessaloniki	Livadeia
16:00 EET	Theodoros Tsirigotis 40'; Georgios Nikas (yellow card) 62'	Report	Fabiano Leismann (yellow card) 49'; Juan Iturbe 52'; Luis Palma 62'; Salem M'Bakata (yellow card) 85'	Stadium: Levadia Municipal Stadium; Referee: Angelos Evangelou

11 January 2023 Second leg	Aris Thessaloniki	1 – 0 (3–1 agg.)	Levadiakos	Thessaloniki
16:00 EET	Daniel Mancini 35' (pen.); Cheick Doukouré (yellow card) 67'; Peter Etebo (yellow card) 84'	Report	Jonas Toró (yellow card) 19'; Stavros Panagiotou (yellow card) 82'	Stadium: Kleanthis Vikelidis Stadium; Referee: Konstantinos Tsetsilas

==== Quarter-finals ====
18 January 2023 First leg	Olympiacos	1 – 0	Aris Thessaloniki	Piraeus
19:00 EET	Marios Vrousai (yellow card) 23'; Garry Rodrigues 30'; Rodinei (yellow card) 90+2'	Report		Stadium: Karaiskakis Stadium; Referee: Tiago Martins (Portugal)

25 January 2023 Second leg	Aris Thessaloniki	0 – 1 (0–2 agg.)	Olympiacos	Thessaloniki
19:30 EET	Fabiano Leismann (yellow card) 10'	Report	Pep Biel (yellow card) 35'; Andreas Ndoj (red card) 82'; Youssef El-Arabi 88'	Stadium: Kleanthis Vikelidis Stadium; Referee: István Vad (Hungary)

=== UEFA Europa Conference League ===
==== Second qualifying round ====
21 July 2022 First leg	Aris Thessaloniki (Greece)	5 – 1	(Belarus) Gomel	Thessaloniki
21:00 EEST	Andre Gray 16' (pen.), 79'; Juan Iturbe 28'; Rafael Camacho 31'; Luis Palma 61'	Report	Fabiano Leismann 11' (o.g.); Alyaksandr Makas (yellow card) 33'; Aleksandr Anufriyev (yellow card) 45+1'; Pavel Sedko (yellow card) 75'	Stadium: Kleanthis Vikelidis Stadium; Attendance: 12.000; Referee: Walter Altmann (Austria)

27 July 2022 Second leg	Gomel (Belarus)	1 – 2 (2–7 agg.)	(Greece) Aris Thessaloniki	Thessaloniki
21:00 EEST	Giorgi Gogolashvili 82' (pen.)	Report	Salem M'Bakata (yellow card) 17'; Pape Cheikh Diop (yellow card) 18'; Bradley Mazikou (yellow card) 33'; Andre Gray 45', 90+3'; Cheick Doukouré (yellow card) 63'; Marvin Peersman (yellow card) 81'; Bryan Dabo (yellow card) 90'	Stadium: Kleanthis Vikelidis Stadium; Attendance: 0 Referee: Nicolas Laforge (Belgium)

==== Third qualifying round ====
4 August 2022 First leg	Maccabi Tel Aviv (Israel)	2 – 0	(Greece) Aris Thessaloniki	Tel Aviv
19:00 EEST	Đorđe Jovanović 29'; Enric Saborit (yellow card) 45+3'; Eran Zahavi 84', 86'; Dan Glazer (yellow card) 90+3'	Report	Juan Iturbe (yellow card) 52'	Stadium: Bloomfield Stadium; Attendance: 21.204; Referee: Dennis Higler (Netherlands)

11 August 2022 Second leg	Aris Thessaloniki (Greece)	2 – 1 (2–3 agg.)	(Israel) Maccabi Tel Aviv	Thessaloniki
20:00 EEST	Fabiano Leismann (yellow card) 30'; Luis Palma (yellow card) 45'; Andre Gray 60' (pen.); Cheick Doukouré 81'; Marvin Peersman (yellow card) 83'; Christos Chatziioannou (yellow card) 90+7'	Report	Enric Saborit (yellow card) 16'; Joris van Overeem (yellow card) 24'; Đorđe Jovanović (yellow card) 49'; Matan Hozez (yellow card) 53'; Dan Glazer (red card) 58'; Nir Bitton (yellow card) 59'; Eyal Golasa (yellow card) 73'; Eran Zahavi 74'; Maor Kandil (yellow card) 83'; Daniel Peretz (yellow card) 90+2'	Stadium: Kleanthis Vikelidis Stadium; Attendance: 16.762; Referee: John Beaton (Scotland)

== Squad statistics ==
=== Appearances ===
As of match played 14 May 2023

#	Position	Nat.	Player	SL 1		GC		UECL		Total	
#	Position	Nat.	Player	Apps	Starts	Apps	Starts	Apps	Starts	Apps	Starts
2	DF	(France) / (Democratic Republic of the Congo)	Salem M'Bakata	23	18	3	0	2	2	28	20
3	DF	(Cameroon)	Nicolas Nkoulou	17	11	0	0	0	0	17	11
4	DF	(Brazil)	Fabiano Leismann	32	30	4	4	4	4	40	38
5	MF	(Germany)	Lukas Rupp	8	3	0	0	0	0	8	3
6	MF	(Burkina Faso) / (France)	Bryan Dabo	27	16	2	2	4	3	33	21
7	FW	(Greece)	Lazaros Christodoulopoulos	13	3	0	0	0	0	13	3
8	MF	(Ivory Coast) / (France)	Cheick Doukouré	16	11	4	1	4	4	24	16
9	FW	(Jamaica) / (England)	Andre Gray	32	20	3	2	4	4	39	26
10	FW	(Argentina) / (Italy)	Mateo García	33	27	4	3	2	1	39	31
11	FW	(Paraguay) / (Argentina)	Juan Iturbe	33	17	4	2	4	3	41	22
13	MF	(Jamaica) / (England)	Peter Etebo	25	23	3	3	0	0	28	26
14	DF	(Czech Republic)	Jakub Brabec	23	23	4	4	4	4	31	31
16	MF	(Czech Republic)	Vladimír Darida	21	21	2	2	0	0	23	23
17	FW	(Honduras)	Luis Palma	29	20	3	1	4	3	36	24
18	DF	(Republic of the Congo) / (France)	Bradley Mazikou	28	21	4	2	3	1	35	24
19	MF	(Spain)	Manu García	17	12	2	2	2	0	21	14
21	FW	(Greece)	Christos Chatziioannou	2	0	0	0	3	0	5	0
22	DF	(England) / (Nigeria)	Moses Odubajo	25	20	3	3	3	2	31	25
23	GK	(Spain)	Julián Cuesta	31	31	3	3	4	4	38	38
25	DF	(Greece)	Christos Marmaridis	0	0	1	0	0	0	1	0
27	FW	(Ivory Coast)	Gervinho	11	5	0	0	0	0	11	5
43	DF	(Belgium) / (Ghana)	Marvin Peersman	29	24	3	3	4	3	36	30
47	FW	(Mauritania) / (France)	Aboubakar Kamara	14	10	2	1	0	0	16	11
64	FW	(Portugal) / (Angola)	Rafael Camacho	25	5	3	2	4	2	32	9
88	MF	(Greece)	Rafail Sgouros	5	1	0	0	0	0	5	1
99	GK	(Greece)	Marios Siampanis	5	5	1	1	0	0	6	6
Players who left the club during this season
	MF	(Senegal) / (Spain)	Pape Cheikh Diop	10	3	0	0	4	1	14	4
	FW	(Honduras)	Edwin Rodríguez	1	0	1	1	0	0	2	1
	FW	(Argentina) / (Italy)	Daniel Mancini	17	16	2	2	4	3	23	21
Total				36		4		4		44	

=== Goals ===
As of match played 14 May 2023

Ranking	Position	Nat.	Player	SL 1	GC	UECL	Total
1	FW	(Honduras)	Luis Palma	11	1	1	13
1	FW	(Jamaica) / (England)	Andre Gray	8	0	5	13
3	FW	(Paraguay) / (Argentina)	Juan Iturbe	4	1	1	6
4	MF	(Czech Republic)	Vladimír Darida	5	0	0	5
5	MF	(Spain)	Manu García	4	0	0	4
5	FW	(Mauritania) / (France)	Aboubakar Kamara	4	0	0	4
5	FW	(Argentina) / (Italy)	Daniel Mancini	3	1	0	4
8	DF	(Brazil)	Fabiano Leismann	3	0	0	3
8	FW	(Argentina) / (Italy)	Mateo García	3	0	0	3
8	FW	(Portugal) / (Angola)	Rafael Camacho	2	0	1	3
11	DF	(England) / (Nigeria)	Moses Odubajo	2	0	0	2
12	DF	(France) / (Democratic Republic of the Congo)	Salem M'Bakata	1	0	0	1
12	FW	(Ivory Coast)	Gervinho	1	0	0	1
12	DF	(Czech Republic)	Jakub Brabec	1	0	0	1
12	DF	(Cameroon)	Nicolas Nkoulou	1	0	0	1
12	MF	(Burkina Faso) / (France)	Bryan Dabo	1	0	0	1
12	MF	(Germany)	Lukas Rupp	1	0	0	1
12	MF	(Ivory Coast) / (France)	Cheick Doukouré	0	0	1	1
Total				55	3	9	67

=== Clean Sheets ===
As of match played 11 January 2023

#	Nat.	Player	SL 1	GC	UECL	Total
23	(Spain)	Julián Cuesta	9	1	0	10
Total			9	1	0	10

== Players' awards ==
=== Best Goal (Super League 1) ===
Matchday	Nat.	Player	Ref
Regular Season
1st	(Jamaica) / (England)	Andre Gray	
5th	(Argentina) / (Italy)	Daniel Mancini	
12th	(Honduras)	Luis Palma	
14th	(Honduras)	Luis Palma	
17th	(Spain)	Manu García	

=== Player of the Month (Super League 1) ===
Month	Nat.	Player	Ref
November	(Honduras)	Luis Palma	
