= Leontis =

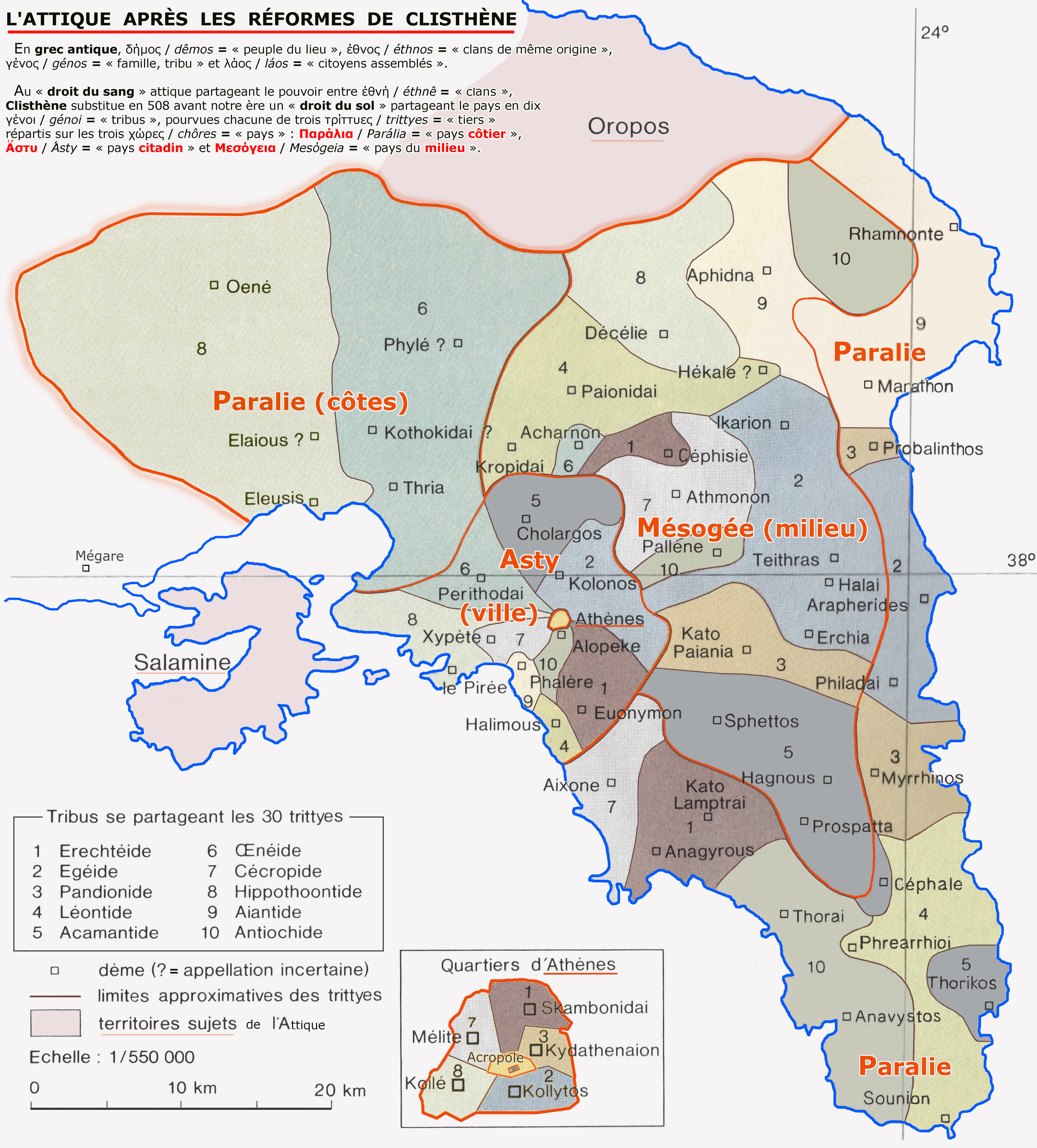
Map of ancient Attica. Trittyes belonging to the phyle of Leontis are numbered "4" and shaded pale green.

Leontis (Ancient Greek: Λεοντίς) was a phyle (tribe) of Ancient Attica.

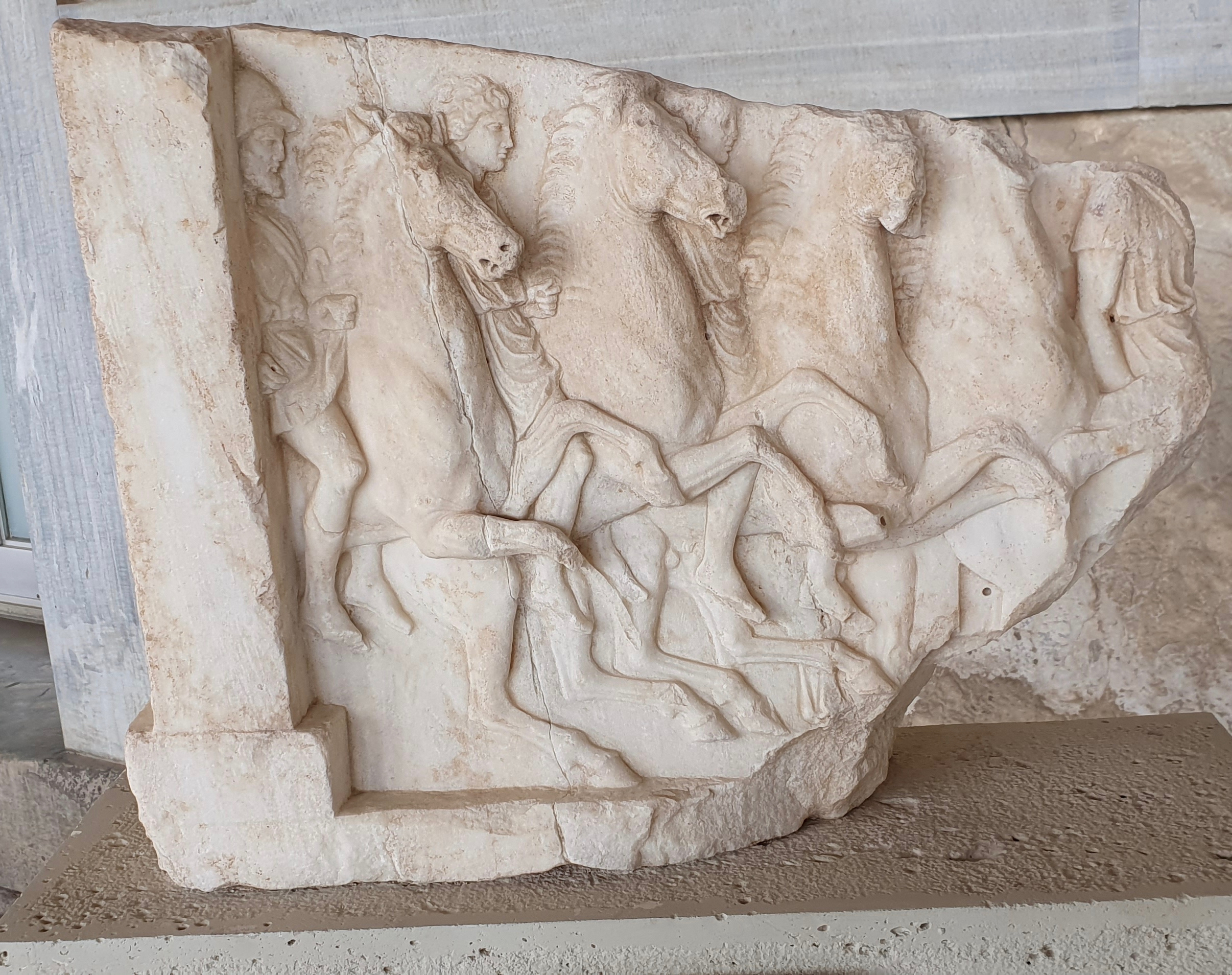
Statue made to mark the victory of the Leontis in an anthippasia, early 4th century BC.

The phyle is shown on the base of a statue made after an anthippasia to commemorate the victory of the phyle at the mock battle.

Themistocles belonged to this phyle.

Two horse-men are listed as part of the Catalogus Hippeum in history who possibly belonged to this phyle, they were Euktimenos and Euthymenes, both living during the 3rd century B.C.E.

The demes of Leontis were: Aethalidae, Halimus, Deiradiotae, Hecale, Eupyridae, Cettus, Colonae, Cropia, Leuconoe, Oeum, Kerameikos, Paeonidae, Peleces, Upper Potamos, Lower Potamus, Deiradiotae, Scambonidae, Sounion, Hybadae, Phrearrhii, Cholleidae.
