= Aethalidae =

Aethalidae or Aithalidai (Ancient Greek: Αἰθαλίδαι) was a deme of ancient Attica, originally of the phyle of Leontis but after 307/6 BCE, of the phyle of Antigonis, sending two delegates to the Athenian Boule.

It is not known for certain where it was located, but it was probably close to Eupyridae, Cropia and Peleces.

== People ==
- Eteokles of Aithalidai, father of Chremonides
