= 2022–23 Super League Greece =

87th season of top-tier football league in Greece

Super League 1
- Season: 2022–23
- Dates: 19 August 2022 – 14 May 2023
- Champions: AEK Athens; 13th Greek title
- Relegated: Ionikos; Levadiakos
- Champions League: AEK Athens; Panathinaikos
- Europa League: Olympiacos
- Europa Conference League: PAOK; Aris
- Matches: 240
- Goals: 564 (2.35 per match)
- Best player: Orbelín Pineda
- Top goalscorer: Cédric Bakambu (18 goals)
- Biggest home win: Olympiacos 6–0 Levadiakos (5 March 2023); PAOK 6–0 Ionikos (5 March 2023)
- Biggest away win: Volos 1–5 Panathinaikos (29 October 2022); PAS Giannina 0–4 Aris (13 November 2022); Volos 0–4 AEK Athens (28 December 2022); Volos 0–4 Olympiacos (8 January 2023); Panetolikos 0–4 OFI (9 January 2023)
- Highest scoring: Olympiacos 6–1 Panetolikos (13 February 2023)
- Longest winning run: Panathinaikos (10 games)
- Longest unbeaten run: Olympiacos (21 games)
- Longest winless run: Lamia (18 games)
- Longest losing run: Volos (8 games)
- Highest attendance: 31,717; Olympiacos 0–0 AEK Athens (13 November 2022)
- Lowest attendance: 510; Ionikos 0–0 Levadiakos (26 August 2022)
- Total attendance: 1,743,838
- Average attendance: 7,357
- All statistics correct as of 14 May 2023.

The 2022–23 Super League Greece, known as Stoiximan Super League for sponsorship reasons, was the 87th season of the Super League Greece, the top Greek professional league for association football clubs, since its establishment in 1959. Olympiacos were the defending champions. As the 2022 FIFA World Cup was started on 21 November, the last round before stoppage was held on 13 November. The league was resumed games on 21 December.

== Teams ==
Locations of the 2022–23 Super League Greece teams

Fourteen teams competed in the league – the top twelve teams from the previous season, the play-off winner and one team promoted from Super League 2. Levadiakos played in the Super League for the first time since the 2018–19 season. Apollon Smyrnis were relegated to 2022–23 Super League Greece 2, ending their two-year stay in the top flight.

Promoted from 2021–22 Super League Greece 2	Relegated from 2021–22 Super League Greece
Levadiakos	Apollon Smyrnis

=== Stadiums and locations ===
Team	Location	Stadium	Capacity	2021–22
AEK Athens	Athens (Nea Filadelfeia)	Agia Sophia Stadium	31,100	5th
Aris	Thessaloniki (Charilaou)	Kleanthis Vikelidis Stadium	22,800	3rd
Asteras Tripolis	Tripoli	Theodoros Kolokotronis Stadium	7,442	9th
Atromitos	Athens (Peristeri)	Peristeri Stadium	10,050	12th
Ionikos	Piraeus (Nikaia)	Neapoli Stadium	6,000	7th
Lamia	Lamia	Lamia Municipal Stadium	5,500	13th
Levadiakos	Livadeia	Levadia Municipal Stadium	5,915	1st (South Group SL2)
OFI	Heraklion	Theodoros Vardinogiannis Stadium	9,088	8th
Olympiacos	Piraeus (Neo Faliro)	Karaiskakis Stadium	33,334	1st
Panathinaikos	Athens (Ampelokipoi)	Leoforos Alexandras Stadium	16,003	4th
Panetolikos	Agrinio	Panetolikos Stadium	7,321	11th
PAOK	Thessaloniki (Toumba)	Toumba Stadium	28,703	2nd
PAS Giannina	Ioannina	Zosimades Stadium	7,652	6th
Volos	Volos	Panthessaliko Stadium	22,700	10th

=== Personnel, kits and TV channel ===
Team	Manager	Captain	Kit manufacturer	Shirt sponsor	Broadcast channel
AEK Athens	(Argentina) Matías Almeyda	(Argentina) Sergio Araujo	Nike	Pame Stoixima	Cosmote TV
Aris	(Greece) Apostolos Terzis	(Spain) Julián Cuesta	Adidas	Net Bet	Nova Sports
Asteras Tripolis	(Greece) Akis Mantzios	(Argentina) Matías Iglesias	Macron	Intrakat	Nova Sports
Atromitos	(Wales) Chris Coleman	(Greece) Kyriakos Kivrakidis	Capelli	Net Bet	Nova Sports
Ionikos	(Greece) Michalis Grigoriou	(Togo) Alaixys Romao	Kappa	Vacant	Cosmote TV
Lamia	(Greece) Leonidas Vokolos	(Serbia) Bojan Šaranov	Macron	Interwetten	Cosmote TV
Levadiakos	(Greece) Giannis Petrakis	(Honduras) Alfredo Mejía	Macron	Betshop	Nova Sports
OFI	(Lithuania) Valdas Dambrauskas	(Greece) Praxitelis Vouros	Puma	OPAP	Cosmote TV
Olympiacos	(France) José Anigo	(Morocco) Youssef El-Arabi	Adidas	Stoiximan	Cosmote TV
Panathinaikos	(Serbia) Ivan Jovanović	(Greece) Dimitris Kourbelis	Kappa	Stoiximan	Cosmote TV
Panetolikos	(Greece) Giannis Anastasiou	(Uruguay) Jorge Díaz	Givova	Interwetten	Cosmote TV
PAS Giannina	(Greece) Thanasis Staikos	(Spain) Pedro Conde	Le Coq	Net Bet	Nova Sports
PAOK	(Romania) Răzvan Lucescu	(Portugal) Vieirinha	Macron	Stoiximan	Nova Sports
Volos	(Greece) Kostas Bratsos	(Greece) Tasos Tsokanis	Luanvi	Interwetten	Cosmote TV

=== Managerial Changes ===
Team	Outgoing manager	Manner of departure	Date of vacancy	Position in table	Incoming manager	Date of appointment
Volos	(Greece) Kostas Bratsos (caretaker)	End of tenure as caretaker	14 May 2022	Pre-season	(France) Oswald Tanchot	3 June 2022
AEK Athens	(Greece) Sokratis Ofrydopoulos (caretaker)	End of tenure as caretaker	17 May 2022	Pre-season	(Argentina) Matías Almeyda	18 May 2022
Asteras Tripolis	(Serbia) Milan Rastavac	End of contract	25 May 2022	Pre-season	(Greece) Iraklis Metaxas	7 June 2022
PAS Giannina	(Greece) Iraklis Metaxas	Sacked	6 June 2022	Pre-season	(Greece) Thanasis Staikos	7 June 2022
Olympiacos	(Portugal) Pedro Martins	Sacked	27 July 2022	Pre-season	(Spain) Carlos Corberán	1 Αugust 2022
Volos	(France) Oswald Tanchot	Sacked	19 August 2022	8th	(Greece) Kostas Bratsos	23 Αugust 2022
Aris	(Argentina) Germán Burgos	Sacked	28 August 2022	6th	(Greece) Apostolos Terzis (caretaker)	29 August 2022
Aris	(Greece) Apostolos Terzis (caretaker)	End of tenure as caretaker	13 September 2022	5th	(England) Alan Pardew	14 September 2022
Olympiacos	(Spain) Carlos Corberán	Sacked	18 September 2022	6th	(Spain) Míchel	20 September 2022
Levadiakos	(Greece) Giannis Taousianis	Sacked	20 September 2022	13th	(Bosnia and Herzegovina) Jasminko Velić	21 September 2022
OFI	(Greece) Nikos Nioplias	Sacked	20 October 2022	11th	(Portugal) Pedro Caravela (caretaker)	21 October 2022
OFI	(Portugal) Pedro Caravela (caretaker)	End of tenure as caretaker	24 October 2022	11th	(Lithuania) Valdas Dambrauskas	25 October 2022
Lamia	(Italy) Gianluca Festa	Sacked	13 November 2022	12th	(Greece) Savvas Pantelidis	16 November 2022
Asteras Tripolis	(Greece) Iraklis Metaxas	Sacked	23 December 2022	9th	(Greece) Akis Mantzios	4 January 2023
Ionikos	(Greece) Dimitris Spanos	Sacked	25 January 2023	14th	(Greece) Michalis Grigoriou	26 January 2023
Aris	(England) Alan Pardew	Sacked	4 February 2023	6th	(Greece) Apostolos Terzis	5 February 2023
Lamia	(Greece) Savvas Pantelidis	Sacked	13 February 2023	14th	(Greece) Leonidas Vokolos	14 February 2023
Levadiakos	(Bosnia and Herzegovina) Jasminko Velić	Sacked	15 February 2023	13th	(Greece) Giannis Petrakis	16 February 2023
Olympiacos	(Spain) Míchel	Resigned	3 April 2023	3rd	(France) José Anigo (caretaker)	4 April 2023

== League table ==
Pos	Team	Pld	W	D	L	GF	GA	GD	Pts	Qualification or relegation
1	Panathinaikos	26	19	4	3	38	12	+26	61	Qualification for the Play-off round
2	AEK Athens	26	19	2	5	51	14	+37	59	Qualification for the Play-off round
3	Olympiacos	26	16	8	2	53	14	+39	56	Qualification for the Play-off round
4	PAOK	26	15	9	2	43	15	+28	54	Qualification for the Play-off round
5	Aris	26	12	4	10	38	24	+14	40	Qualification for the Play-off round
6	Volos	26	11	6	9	31	38	−7	39	Qualification for the Play-off round
7	Panetolikos	26	7	8	11	26	38	−12	29 (Note: Head to head points: Panetolikos 4, Atromitos 1)	Qualification for the Play-out round
8	Atromitos	26	7	8	11	25	29	−4	29	Qualification for the Play-out round
9	OFI	26	6	8	12	23	34	−11	26	Qualification for the Play-out round
10	Asteras Tripolis	26	4	13	9	19	30	−11	25	Qualification for the Play-out round
11	PAS Giannina	26	4	11	11	24	41	−17	23	Qualification for the Play-out round
12	Ionikos	26	4	6	16	16	42	−26	18	Qualification for the Play-out round
13	Lamia	26	2	11	13	13	45	−32	17 (Note: Head to head points: Lamia 4, Levadiakos 1)	Qualification for the Play-out round
14	Levadiakos	26	3	8	15	14	38	−24	17	Qualification for the Play-out round

Source: Super League Greece
Rules for classification: 1) Points; 2) Head-to-head points; 3) Head-to-head goal difference; 4) Goal difference; 5) Goals scored; 6) Play-offs (neutral ground).
(Note: Criterion 6 is only used if needed to decide champion, teams for relegation or teams for UEFA competitions).

== Results ==
Home \ Away	AEK	ARIS	AST	ATR	ION	LAM	LEV	OFI	OLY	PAO	PNE	PAOK	PAS	VOL
AEK Athens	—	3–0	2–0	1–0	4–1	3–0	3–0	3–0	1–3	1–0	4–1	2–0	2–0	0–1
Aris	0–2	—	3–0	2–1	2–1	5–0	3–0	1–1	2–1	1–2	1–0	0–0	3–1	3–0
Asteras Tripolis	1–1	0–2	—	1–1	1–0	3–0	0–0	2–0	0–0	1–0	0–0	2–2	1–1	0–0
Atromitos	0–1 (Note: Originally scheduled to be played on 5 February 2023, the match Atromitos – AEK Athens did not start. The referee, after an appeal from AEK, counted that the crossbars were below the designated limits. The people from Atromitos attempted to fix the issue, but one of the crossbars remained below the designated limits, therefore the match did not start. On 14 February 2023, the court stated that the match will be conducted, while AEK decided to appeal the decision. On 1 March 2023, the appeal was rejected. The match was conducted on 8 March 2023 and ended 0–1 in favour of AEK. On 10 March 2023, after their victory, AEK announced their intention to appeal to Court of Arbitration for Sport (CAS) to overturn the initial verdict which declared Atromitos innocent for the lowered crossbars.)	0–0	2–0	—	2–0	0–0	1–0	3–1	1–1	0–2	1–1	1–1	2–1	0–2
Ionikos	1–2	1–0	1–0	1–4	—	1–1	0–0	0–2	0–2	1–1	1–1	0–3	2–2	0–1
Lamia	0–3	2–1	0–0	1–1	0–2	—	1–0	1–4	0–3	0–2	1–3	0–3	1–1	2–2
Levadiakos	0–2	1–1	1–1	2–1	1–0	0–0	—	2–0	0–1	0–1	0–0	1–1	1–3	0–3
OFI	0–3	0–3	1–0	0–1	0–2	0–0	2–1	—	1–2	0–2	1–2	1–1	0–0	0–0
Olympiacos	0–0	1–0	5–0	2–0	3–1	2–0	6–0	2–1	—	0–0	6–1	1–2	2–0	1–1
Panathinaikos	2–1	1–0	1–0	2–0	1–0	2–0	1–0	1–1	1–1	—	2–0	0–3	3–0	2–0
Panetolikos	0–2	3–1	0–0	2–0	1–0	1–1	0–0	0–4	0–2	0–1	—	0–2	1–1	2–3
PAOK	2–0	1–0	2–2	2–1	6–0	1–0	3–2	0–0	0–0	1–2	1–0	—	2–0	3–0
PAS Giannina	2–1	0–4	2–1	1–1	0–0	1–1	2–1	2–2	2–2	0–1	1–4	0–0	—	0–1
Volos	0–4	2–0	3–3	2–1	2–0	1–1	2–1	0–1	0–4	1–5	2–3	0–1	2–1	—

Source: Super League Greece
Legend: Blue = home team win; Yellow = draw; Red = away team win.
For upcoming matches, an "a" indicates there is an article about the rivalry between the two participants.

== Positions by round ==
The table lists the positions of teams after each week of matches. To preserve chronological evolvements, any postponed matches are not included in the round at which they were originally scheduled, but added to the full round they were played immediately afterwards. For example, if a match is scheduled for round 13, but then postponed and played between rounds 16 and 17, it will be added to the standings for round 16.

Team ╲ Round	1	2	3	4	5	6	7	8	9	10	11	12	13	14	15	16	17	18	19	20	21	22	23	24	25	26
Panathinaikos	6	1	1	1	1	1	1	1	1	1	1	1	1	1	1	1	1	1	1	2	1	1	1	1	2	1
AEK Athens	1	5	4	7	4	2	2	2	2	2	2	2	2	2	2	2	2	2	2	1	2	2	2	2	1	2
Olympiacos	4	3	2	3	6	3	3	5	4	3	3	3	4	4	4	4	4	3	4	4	4	3	3	3	3	3
PAOK	5	2	3	2	2	5	5	4	5	5	5	5	3	3	3	3	3	4	3	3	3	4	4	4	4	4
Aris	2	6	7	5	3	7	8	6	6	6	6	6	6	6	6	6	5	6	5	5	6	6	6	5	6	5
Volos	8	4	8	8	7	4	4	3	3	4	4	4	5	5	5	5	6	5	6	6	5	5	5	6	5	6
Panetolikos	10	8	6	6	8	6	7	7	7	7	7	8	7	8	8	7	8	8	8	8	8	8	8	7	8	7
Atromitos	3	7	5	4	5	8	6	8	8	8	8	7	8	7	7	8	7	7	7	7	7	7	7	8	7	8
OFI	11	14	10	11	10	11	11	11	11	12	14	14	10	10	10	11	11	11	9	10	10	10	10	9	9	9
Asteras Tripolis	7	9	9	10	9	9	9	9	9	10	9	9	9	9	9	9	9	9	11	9	9	9	9	10	10	10
PAS Giannina	12	11	13	9	11	12	12	12	12	9	11	10	12	11	11	10	10	10	10	11	11	11	11	11	11	11
Ionikos	9	10	12	14	14	14	14	14	14	14	12	12	14	14	14	14	14	14	14	14	12	12	12	12	13	12
Lamia	13	12	11	12	12	10	10	10	10	11	10	11	11	12	13	13	13	13	13	13	14	14	14	14	12	13
Levadiakos	14	13	14	13	13	13	13	13	13	13	13	13	13	13	12	12	12	12	12	12	13	13	13	13	14	14

Leader and Play-off round
Play-off round
Play-out round

Source: Super League Greece

== Play-off round ==
The top six teams from Regular season will meet twice (10 matches per team) for places in the 2023–24 UEFA Champions League, 2023–24 UEFA Europa League and 2023–24 UEFA Europa Conference League as well as deciding the league champion.

Pos	Team	Pld	W	D	L	GF	GA	GD	Pts	Qualification
1	AEK Athens (C)	36	26	5	5	69	17	+52	83	Qualification for the Champions League third qualifying round
2	Panathinaikos	36	23	9	4	47	16	+31	78	Qualification for the Champions League second qualifying round
3	Olympiacos	36	21	10	5	70	24	+46	73	Qualification for the Europa League third qualifying round
4	PAOK	36	19	10	7	57	32	+25	67	Qualification for the Europa Conference League second qualifying round
5	Aris	36	15	6	15	55	41	+14	51	Qualification for the Europa Conference League second qualifying round
6	Volos	36	11	7	18	35	66	−31	40	

Source: Super League Greece
Rules for classification: 1) Points; 2) Head-to-head points (Regular season and play-off); 3) Head-to-head goal difference (Regular season and play-off); 4) Regular season position.
(C) Champions

=== Results ===
Home \ Away	AEK	PAO	OLY	PAOK	ARIS	VOL
AEK Athens	—	0–0	0–0	4–0	3–1	4–0
Panathinaikos	0–0	—	2–0	1–1	1–1	0–0
Olympiacos	1–3	1–0	—	3–1	2–2	5–0
PAOK	0–1	1–2	0–1	—	3–2	4–2
Aris	1–2	0–1	2–1	1–2	—	4–2
Volos	0–1	0–2	0–3	0–2	0–3	—

Source: Soccerway
Legend: Blue = home team win; Yellow = draw; Red = away team win.
For upcoming matches, an "a" indicates there is an article about the rivalry between the two participants.

=== Play-off round positions by round ===
Team ╲ Round	26	27	28	29	30	31	32	33	34	35	36
AEK Athens	2	2	2	2	2	2	2	2	2	1	1
Panathinaikos	1	1	1	1	1	1	1	1	1	2	2
Olympiacos	3	3	3	3	3	3	3	3	3	3	3
PAOK	4	4	4	4	4	4	4	4	4	4	4
Aris	5	5	5	5	5	5	5	5	5	5	5
Volos	6	6	6	6	6	6	6	6	6	6	6

Champion and Champions League third qualifying round
Champions League second qualifying round
Europa League third qualifying round
Europa Conference League second qualifying round

Source: Super League Greece

== Play-out round ==
The bottom eight teams will meet once (seven matches per team) to avoid relegation. The two last placed teams will be relegated at the end of the season.

Pos	Team	Pld	W	D	L	GF	GA	GD	Pts	Relegation
7	OFI	33	10	11	12	37	41	−4	41	
8	Atromitos	33	9	11	13	34	36	−2	38	
9	PAS Giannina	33	7	13	13	33	50	−17	34	
10	Asteras Tripolis	33	5	16	12	23	36	−13	31	
11	Panetolikos	33	7	9	17	32	53	−21	30	
12	Lamia	33	5	14	14	23	53	−30	29	
13	Ionikos (R)	33	6	9	18	24	51	−27	27	Relegation to Super League 2
14	Levadiakos (R)	33	4	14	15	25	48	−23	26	Relegation to Super League 2

Source: Super League Greece, Soccerway
Rules for classification: 1) Points; 2) Head-to-head points (Regular season and play-off); 3) Head-to-head goal difference (Regular season and play-off); 4) Regular season position.
(R) Relegated

=== Results ===
Home \ Away	OFI	ATR	PAS	AST	PNE	LAM	ION	LEV
OFI	—	—	—	1–1	—	4–1	2–2	1–1
Atromitos	2–3	—	1–1	—	2–0	—	2–0	—
PAS Giannina	0–1	—	—	1–0	3–2	—	—	—
Asteras Tripolis	—	1–1	—	—	2–1	0–0	—	0–1
Panetolikos	0–2	—	—	—	—	1–3	0–1	2–2
Lamia	—	1–0	2–0	—	—	—	—	1–1
Ionikos	—	—	0–1	1–0	—	2–2	—	—
Levadiakos	—	1–1	3–3	—	—	—	2–2	—

Source: Super League Greece
Legend: Blue = home team win; Yellow = draw; Red = away team win.
For upcoming matches, an "a" indicates there is an article about the rivalry between the two participants.

=== Play-out round positions by round ===
Team ╲ Round	26	27	28	29	30	31	32	33
OFI	9	10	8	8	8	7	7	7
Atromitos	8	7	7	7	7	8	8	8
PAS Giannina	11	11	12	11	11	9	9	9
Asteras Tripolis	10	9	10	10	9	10	10	10
Panetolikos	7	8	9	9	10	11	11	11
Lamia	13	12	11	13	12	12	12	12
Ionikos	12	14	13	12	13	13	13	13
Levadiakos	14	13	14	14	14	14	14	14

Relegation to 2023–24 Super League Greece 2

Source: Super League Greece

== Season statistics ==
=== Top scorers ===
As of 15 May 2023

Rank	Player	Club	Goals
1	(Democratic Republic of the Congo) Cédric Bakambu	Olympiacos	18
2	(Trinidad and Tobago) Levi García	AEK Athens	14
3	(Greece) Nikos Karelis	Panetolikos	13
4	(Slovenia) Andraž Šporar	Panathinaikos	11
4	(Honduras) Luis Palma	Aris	11
6	(Argentina) Rodrigo Erramuspe	PAS Giannina	9
6	(Mexico) Orbelín Pineda	AEK Athens	9
6	(Serbia) Mijat Gaćinović	AEK Athens	9
6	(Spain) Pep Biel	Olympiacos	9
10	(Spain) Aitor Cantalapiedra	Panathinaikos	8
10	(Morocco) Nordin Amrabat	AEK Athens	8
10	(Switzerland) Steven Zuber	AEK Athens	8
10	(Jamaica) Andre Gray	Aris	8
10	(Spain) Jon Toral	OFI	8

==== Hat-tricks ====
As of 15 May 2023

Player	For	Against	Result	Date
(Spain) Aitor Cantalapiedra	Panathinaikos	PAS Giannina	3–0 (H)	17 September 2022
(Greece) Nikos Karelis	Panetolikos	PAS Giannina	4–1 (A)	3 October 2022
(Honduras) Luis Palma	Aris	Lamia	5–0 (H)	8 November 2022
(Spain) Manu García	Aris	Volos	3–0 (H)	21 January 2023

=== Top assists ===
As of 15 May 2023

Rank	Player	Club	Assists
1	(Germany) Khaled Narey	PAOK	10
2	(Greece) Kostas Fortounis	Olympiacos	9
3	(Argentina) Daniel Mancini	Aris / Panathinaikos	8
4	(Argentina) Sergio Araujo	AEK Athens	7
4	(Greece) Petros Mantalos	AEK Athens	7
4	(Sweden) Niclas Eliasson	AEK Athens	7
7	(Spain) Paolo Fernandes	Volos / AEK Athens	6
7	(Colombia) James Rodríguez	Olympiacos	6
7	(Greece) Victor Klonaridis	Atromitos	6
10	(Sweden) Eric Larsson	OFI	5
10	(Morocco) Youssef El-Arabi	Olympiacos	5
10	(Trinidad and Tobago) Levi García	AEK Athens	5
10	(Spain) Carles Soria	PAS Giannina	5
10	(Guinea) Ahmad Mendes Moreira	PAS Giannina	5

== Awards ==
=== Stoiximan Player of the Month ===
Month	Player	Club	Ref
August	(Slovenia) Andraž Šporar	Panathinaikos	
September	(Spain) Aitor Cantalapiedra	Panathinaikos	
September	(Spain) Pep Biel	Olympiacos	
October	(Colombia) James Rodríguez	Olympiacos	
November	(Honduras) Luis Palma	Aris	
December	(Netherlands) Tom van Weert	AEK Athens	
January	(Democratic Republic of the Congo) Cédric Bakambu	Olympiacos	
February	(South Korea) Hwang In-beom	Olympiacos	
March	(Greece) Georgios Athanasiadis	AEK Athens	
April	(Czech Republic) Vladimír Darida	Aris	
May	(Greece) Konstantinos Tzolakis	Olympiacos	

=== Stoiximan Player of the Club ===
Club	MVP	Ref
AEK Athens	(Mexico) Orbelín Pineda	
Panathinaikos	(Italy) Alberto Brignoli	
Olympiacos	(South Korea) Hwang In-beom	
PAOK	(Greece) Giannis Konstantelias	
Aris	(Czech Republic) Vladimír Darida	
Volos	(Spain) Paolo Fernandes	
OFI	(Greece) Christos Mandas	
Atromitos	(Greece) Andreas Gianniotis	
PAS Giannina	(Argentina) Rodrigo Erramuspe	
Asteras Tripolis	(Spain) Pepe Castaño	
Panetolikos	(Greece) Nikos Karelis	
Lamia	(Costa Rica) Cristopher Núñez	
Ionikos	(France) Bandiougou Fadiga	
Levadiakos	(Greece) Georgios Vrakas	

=== Stoiximan Player of the Season ===
Player	Club	Votes	Ref
(Mexico) Orbelín Pineda	AEK Athens	20.08%	

=== Stoiximan Goal of the Season ===
Player	Club	Match	Votes	Ref
(Greece) Kostas Fortounis	Olympiacos	vs Ionikos 0–2 (Matchday 16)	34.47%	

=== Stoiximan Best Goal ===
Matchday	Player	Club	Ref
Regular Season
1st	(Jamaica) Andre Gray	Aris	
2nd	(Argentina) Sebastián Palacios	Panathinaikos	
3rd	(Spain) Pep Biel	Olympiacos	
4th	(Greece) Konstantinos Balogiannis	OFI	
5th	(Argentina) Daniel Mancini	Aris	
6th	(Serbia) Mijat Gaćinović	AEK Athens	
7th	(Poland) Damian Szymański	AEK Athens	
8th	(Germany) Khaled Narey	PAOK	
9th	(Spain) Pep Biel	Olympiacos	
10th	(Argentina) Sebastián Palacios	Panathinaikos	
11th	(Spain) Pep Biel	Olympiacos	
12th	(Honduras) Luis Palma	Aris	
13th	(Serbia) Andrija Živković	PAOK	
14th	(Honduras) Luis Palma	Aris	
15th	(Mexico) Orbelín Pineda	AEK Athens	
16th	(Greece) Kostas Fortounis	Olympiacos	
17th	(Spain) Manu García	Aris	
18th	(Argentina) Sergio Araujo	AEK Athens	
19th	(Switzerland) Steven Zuber	AEK Athens	
20th	(Argentina) Julián Bartolo	Asteras Tripolis	
21st	(Slovenia) Andraž Šporar	Panathinaikos	
22nd	(Spain) Sergi Canós	Olympiacos	
23rd	(Germany) Khaled Narey	PAOK	
24th	(Czech Republic) Vladimir Darida	Aris	
25th	(Serbia) Andrija Živković	PAOK	
26th	(Democratic Republic of the Congo) Cédric Bakambu	Olympiacos	
Play-offs/Play-outs
1st	(Honduras) Luis Palma	Aris	
2nd	(Argentina) Sergio Araujo	AEK Athens	
3rd/4th	(Democratic Republic of the Congo) Cédric Bakambu	Olympiacos	
5th	(Serbia) Mijat Gaćinović	AEK Athens	
6th/7th	(Honduras) Luis Palma	Aris	
8th/9th	(Jamaica) Andre Gray	Aris	
10th	(Mexico) Orbelín Pineda	AEK Athens	

=== Annual awards ===
Annual awards were announced on 27 November 2023.

Award	Winner	Club
Greek Player of the Season	(Greece) Fotis Ioannidis	Panathinaikos
Foreign Player of the Season	(Mexico) Orbelín Pineda	AEK Athens
Young Player of the Season	(Greece) Giannis Konstantelias	PAOK
Goalkeeper of the Season	(Italy) Alberto Brignoli	Panathinaikos
Golden Boot	(Democratic Republic of the Congo) Cédric Bakambu	Olympiacos
Manager of the Season	(Argentina) Matías Almeyda	AEK Athens

Team of the Season
Goalkeeper	(Italy) Alberto Brignoli (Panathinaikos)			
Defence	(Brazil) Rodinei (Olympiacos)	(Cameroon) Harold Moukoudi (AEK Athens)	(Greece) Konstantinos Koulierakis (PAOK)	(Iran) Ehsan Hajsafi (AEK Athens)
Midfield	(Serbia) Mijat Gaćinović (AEK Athens)	(Spain) Rubén Pérez (Panathinaikos)	(Greece) Giannis Konstantelias (PAOK)	(Mexico) Orbelín Pineda (AEK Athens)
Attack	(Greece) Fotis Ioannidis (Panathinaikos) / (Democratic Republic of the Congo) Cédric Bakambu (Olympiacos)		(Trinidad and Tobago) Levi García (AEK Athens)	

== Attendances ==
AEK Athens drew the highest average home attendance in the 2022–23 edition of the Super League Greece.

#	Team	Total attendance	Average attendance
1	AEK Athens	495,810	27,545
2	Olympiacos	336,945	19,820
3	PAOK	237,325	13,185
4	Panathinaikos	219,962	12,220
5	Aris	134,078	7,449
6	Volos	84,577	4,699
7	OFI	65,506	3,853
8	Panetolikos	35,405	2,083
9	PAS Giannina	28,545	2,039
10	Lamia	23,722	1,483
11	Levadiakos	23,169	1,448
12	Atromitos	23,137	1,361
13	Ionikos	19,153	1,197
14	Asteras Tripolis	15,454	909
