= Leuconoe (Attica) =

Coordinates: 38°00′28″N 23°41′30″E

Leuconoe or Leukonoe (Ancient Greek: Λευκονόη), or Leuconoeum or Leukonoion (Λευκόνοιον), or Leukonefs (Λευκονοιεύς) was a deme of ancient Attica of the phyle of Leontis.

Its site is tentatively located near modern Peristeri.

== People ==
- Demochares, a leading Athenian politician in 307-302 BCE.
