= Lukas Rupp =

German footballer (born 1991)

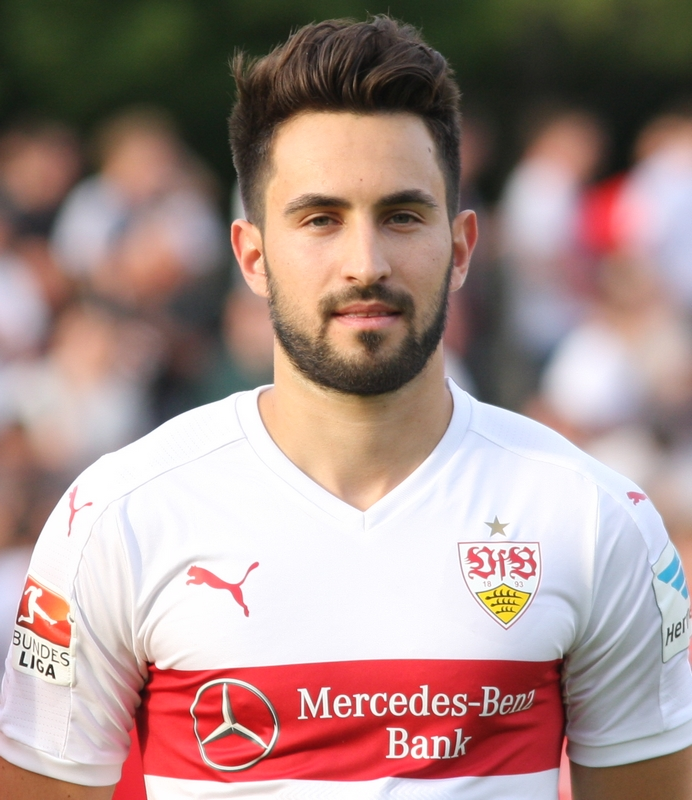
- Rupp with VfB Stuttgart in 2015

Personal information
- Full name: Lukas Peter Rupp
- Date of birth: 8 January 1991 (age 35)
- Place of birth: Heidelberg, Germany
- Height: 1.78 m (5 ft 10 in)
- Position: Midfielder

Team information
- Current team: VfR Mannheim
- Number: 10

Senior career*
Years	Team	Apps	(Gls)
2008–2011	Karlsruher SC II	24	(7)
2009–2011	Karlsruher SC	26	(3)
2011–2014	Borussia Mönchengladbach II	14	(3)
2011–2014	Borussia Mönchengladbach	34	(0)
2012	→ SC Paderborn (loan)	15	(2)
2014–2015	SC Paderborn	31	(4)
2015–2016	VfB Stuttgart	29	(5)
2016–2020	1899 Hoffenheim	43	(5)
2016–2020	1899 Hoffenheim II	4	(1)
2020–2022	Norwich City	53	(0)
2023–2024	Aris	14	(1)
2024–2026	Hessen Kassel	49	(11)
2026–	VfR Mannheim	8	(0)
- * Club domestic league appearances and goals as of 24 September 2026

Lukas Peter Rupp (German pronunciation: [ˈluːkas ˈʁʊp]; born 8 January 1991) is a German professional footballer who plays as a midfielder for Regionalliga Südwest German club VfR Mannheim.

Rupp has spent most of his career playing in Germany, playing for teams such as Karlsruher SC, Borussia Mönchengladbach, SC Paderborn 07, VfB Stuttgart, and 1899 Hoffenheim. He has also played in England with Norwich City, and in Greece with Aris.

== Career ==
=== Early career ===
Rupp's father Franz Rupp was a professional Handball player in Leutershausen. Rupp's professional career as a footballer began with Karlsruher SC. In June 2011, alongside teammate Matthias Zimmermann, Rupp was signed by Borussia Mönchengladbach. Upon his signing, sporting director Max Eberl praised his versatility. Despite managing an assist in a DFB-Pokal match against SSV Jahn Regensburg, 21 year old Rupp was unable to secure first team football in his debut season at the Borussia-Park, playing just three times, before being loaned to SC Paderborn.

=== SC Paderborn ===
At the end of the 2013–14 season, Rupp was informed that his Borussia Mönchengladbach contract was not to be renewed. Rupp then joined SC Paderborn 07, for whom he had previously played for on loan. He signed a two-year deal with Paderborn, who had just been promoted for the first time in their history under coach André Breitenreiter. Rupp's new side began the season well, topping the table after four rounds, and Rupp was personally successful in taking a first team spot. Rupp came off the bench to score twice in a crucial relegation battle against SC Freiburg, as Paderborn came back to win 2–1, their third away win of the campaign. However, at the end of the season, the team was relegated alongside Freiburg, having finished in last place.

=== VfB Stuttgart ===
After Paderborn's relegation, Rupp moved to VfB Stuttgart, who had been Bundesliga champions less than a decade ago. Costing Stuttgart nothing in transfer fees, Rupp signed a three-year contract. On the same day, Stuttgart also signed PSV Eindhoven goalkeeper Przemysław Tytoń. Rupp missed some games having suffered from flu, but still made 29 appearances over the course of the season. By the end of the year, Stuttgart were relegated, following a last day 3–1 defeat to VfL Wolfsburg. Rupp's performances were described as the 'bright light in a season to forget' and he was linked with Middlesbrough, newly promoted to the Premier League. Rupp was Stuttgart's player of the season, with his consistency that brought 5 goals and 6 assists.

=== 1899 Hoffenheim ===
Rupp's Stuttgart contract was due to run until 2018, but after relegation, his future became uncertain, and he openly admitted that he was looking to leave to ensure top flight football for the upcoming season. On 28 June, it was reported that Rupp was in talks with 1899 Hoffenheim and that a transfer was 'imminent'. The reported cost was up to €6 million. The next day his transfer was confirmed, and Rupp returned to the area of his birth, with Hoffenheim very nearby to his hometown Heidelberg.

=== Norwich City ===
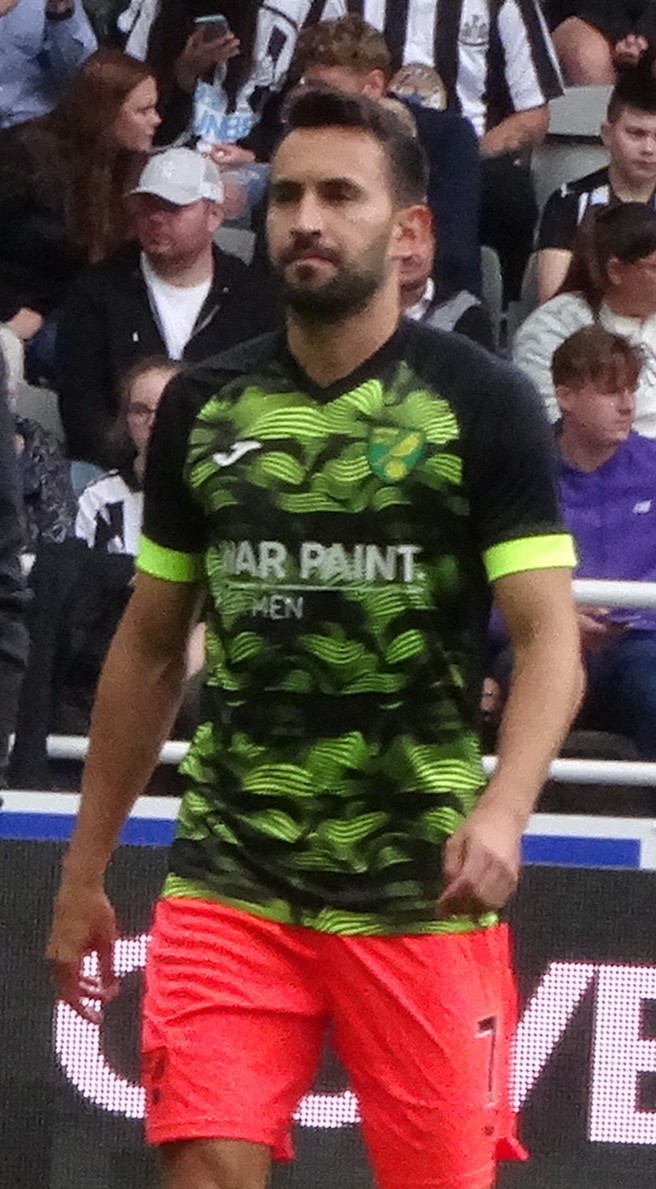
Rupp warming up for Norwich City in 2021

In January 2020 he signed for English club Norwich City. He scored his first goal for the club on 24 August 2021, in a 6–0 victory over Bournemouth in the second round of the EFL Cup.

=== Aris ===
In January 2023 he signed for Greek club Aris.

=== Later career ===
He then returned to Germany, signing for KSV Hessen Kassel.

In June 2026 he signed for hometown club VfR Mannheim.

== Personal life ==
Rupp split from his girlfriend Noelle Mondoloni in 2014.

== Career statistics ==
As of match played 8 August 2022

Appearances and goals by club, season and competition
Club	Season	League			National cup		League cup		Other		Total	
Club	Season	Division	Apps	Goals	Apps	Goals	Apps	Goals	Apps	Goals	Apps	Goals
Karlsruher SC II	2008–09	Regionalliga Süd	4	1	—		—		—		4	1
Karlsruher SC II	2009–10	Regionalliga Süd	17	4	—		—		—		17	4
Karlsruher SC II	2010–11	Regionalliga Süd	3	2	—		—		—		3	2
Karlsruher SC II	Total		24	7	—		—		—		24	7
Karlsruher SC	2009–10	2. Bundesliga	2	0	0	0	—		—		2	0
Karlsruher SC	2010–11	2. Bundesliga	24	3	0	0	—		—		24	3
Karlsruher SC	Total		26	3	0	0	—		—		26	3
Borussia Mönchengladbach II	2011–12	Regionalliga West	7	2	—		—		—		7	2
Borussia Mönchengladbach II	2012–13	Regionalliga West	3	0	—		—		—		3	0
Borussia Mönchengladbach II	2013–14	Regionalliga West	4	1	—		—		—		4	1
Borussia Mönchengladbach II	Total		14	3	—		—		—		14	3
Borussia Mönchengladbach	2011–12	Bundesliga	3	0	1	0	—		—		3	0
Borussia Mönchengladbach	2012–13	Bundesliga	21	0	1	0	—		3	0	25	0
Borussia Mönchengladbach	2013–14	Bundesliga	10	0	1	0	—		—		11	0
Borussia Mönchengladbach	Total		34	0	3	0	—		3	0	40	0
SC Paderborn (loan)	2011–12	2. Bundesliga	15	2	0	0	—		—		15	2
SC Paderborn	2014–15	Bundesliga	31	4	1	0	—		—		32	4
SC Paderborn	Total		46	6	1	0	—		—		47	6
VfB Stuttgart	2015–16	Bundesliga	29	5	3	1	—		—		32	6
1899 Hoffenheim II	2016–17	Regionalliga Südwest	1	1	—		—		—		1	1
1899 Hoffenheim II	2018–19	Regionalliga Südwest	3	0	—		—		—		4	0
1899 Hoffenheim II	Total		4	1	—		—		—		4	1
1899 Hoffenheim	2016–17	Bundesliga	14	2	2	0	—		—		16	2
1899 Hoffenheim	2017–18	Bundesliga	21	3	1	0	—		3	0	25	3
1899 Hoffenheim	2018–19	Bundesliga	1	0	0	0	—		—		1	0
1899 Hoffenheim	2019–20	Bundesliga	7	0	2	0	—		—		9	0
1899 Hoffenheim	Total		43	5	5	0	—		3	0	51	5
Norwich City	2019–20	Premier League	12	0	3	0	0	0	—		15	0
Norwich City	2020–21	EFL Championship	23	0	1	0	1	0	—		25	0
Norwich City	2021–22	Premier League	19	0	1	1	2	1	—		22	2
Norwich City	Total		54	0	5	1	3	1	0	0	62	2
Aris	2022–23	Super League Greece	8	1	—		—		—		8	1
Aris	2023–24	Super League Greece	0	0	0	0	—		2	0	2	0
Aris	Total		8	1	0	0	—		2	0	10	1
Career total			281	31	17	2	3	1	8	0	309	34

== Honours ==
Norwich City

- EFL Championship: 2020–21
