= Hybadae =

Hybadae or Hybadai (Ancient Greek: Ὑβάδαι) was a deme of ancient Attica, of the phyle of Leontis, sending one or two delegates to the Athenian Boule.

Its site is unlocated.
