= Athanasios Garavelis =

Greek association football player (born 1992)

Thanasis Garavelis
Personal information
- Full name: Athanasios Garavelis
- Date of birth: 6 August 1992 (age 34)
- Place of birth: Kozani, Greece
- Height: 1.90 m (6 ft 3 in)
- Position: Goalkeeper

Team information
- Current team: Niki Volos
- Number: 1

Youth career
- Kozani

Senior career*
Years	Team	Apps	(Gls)
2010–2013	Kozani	58	(0)
2013–2019	Xanthi	5	(0)
2016–2017	→ Panthrakikos (loan)	13	(0)
2017	→ Panegialios (loan)	18	(0)
2019–2021	Volos	38	(0)
2021–2023	Lamia	28	(0)
2023–2024	Niki Volos	28	(0)
2024–2025	Levadiakos	17	(0)
2025–	Niki Volos	17	(0)
- * Club domestic league appearances and goals as of April 2, 2026

Thanasis Garavelis (Greek: Θανάσης Γκαραβέλης; born 6 August 1992) is a Greek professional association football player who plays as a goalkeeper for Super League 2 club Niki Volos.

== Career ==
On 20 June 2019, Garavelis joined newly promoted side Volos, on a free transfer.

On 8 June 2021, Lamia announced he had signed a contract with the club.

== Career statistics ==
As of 2 April 2026

Club	Season	League			Cup		Continental		Other		Total	
Club	Season	Division	Apps	Goals	Apps	Goals	Apps	Goals	Apps	Goals	Apps	Goals
Xanthi	2014–15	Superleague Greece	1	0	0	0	—		—		1	0
Xanthi	2015–16	Superleague Greece	0	0	1	0	—		—		1	0
Xanthi	2016–17	Superleague Greece	0	0	0	0	—		—		0	0
Xanthi	2017–18	Superleague Greece	1	0	2	0	—		—		3	0
Xanthi	2018–19	Superleague Greece	0	0	0	0	—		—		0	0
Xanthi	Total		2	0	3	0	—		—		5	0
Panthrakikos (loan)	2016–17	Football League Greece	11	0	2	0	—		—		13	0
Panegialios (loan)	2016–17	Football League Greece	18	0	—		—		—		18	0
Volos	2019–20	Superleague Greece	23	0	1	0	—		—		24	0
Volos	2020–21	Superleague Greece	12	0	2	0	—		—		14	0
Volos	Total		35	0	3	0	—		—		38	0
Lamia	2021–22	Superleague Greece	18	0	0	0	—		—		18	0
Lamia	2022–23	Superleague Greece	10	0	4	0	—		—		14	0
Lamia	Total		28	0	4	0	—		—		32	0
Niki Volos	2023–24	Superleague Greece 2	28	0	6	0	—		—		34	0
Levadiakos	2024–25	Superleague Greece	17	0	1	0	—		—		18	0
Niki Volos	2025–26	Superleague Greece 2	17	0	0	0	—		—		17	0
Career total			156	0	19	0	0	0	0	0	175	0
