= Cettus =

Coordinates: 38°00′49″N 23°37′26″E

Cettus or Kettos (Ancient Greek: Κηττός) was a deme, or suburb, of ancient Attica of the phyle of Leontis, sending three or four delegates to the Boule.

Its site is tentatively located near modern Daphni.
