= Salem M'Bakata =

Congolese footballer (born 1998)

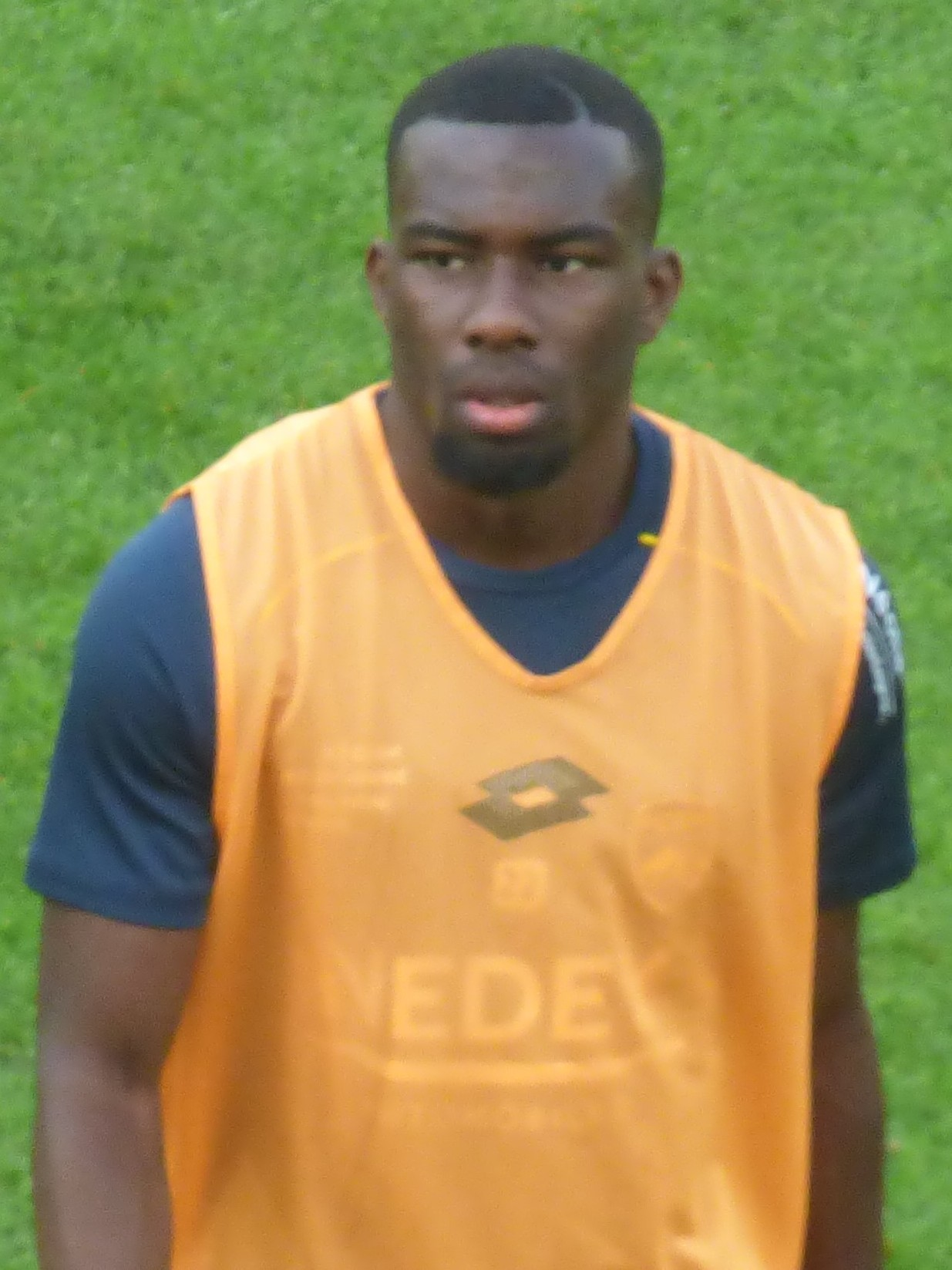
- M'Bakata in 2018

Personal information
- Date of birth: 19 April 1998 (age 28)
- Place of birth: Kinshasa, Congo DR
- Height: 1.77 m (5 ft 10 in)
- Position: Right-back

Youth career
- –2018: Sochaux

Senior career*
Years	Team	Apps	(Gls)
2015–2020	Sochaux II	59	(2)
2018–2021	Sochaux	61	(0)
2022–2023	Aris	31	(2)
2023–2026	Gaziantep	51	(0)
- * Club domestic league appearances and goals as of 10 June 2026

Salem M'Bakata (born 19 April 1998) is a Congolese professional footballer who plays as a right-back.

== Club career ==
On 4 February 2022, Aris officially announced the signing of the Congolese defender on a free transfer, until the summer of 2024.

== International career ==
In 2015, M'Bakata received a callup to the DR Congo U20s for a friendly against the England U20s, which he did not accept, citing his focus being at the club level.

== Career statistics ==
As of match played 4 August 2023

Appearances and goals by club, season and competition
Club	Season	League			National cup (Note: Includes Coupe de France, Greek Cup)		Europe		Total	
Club	Season	Division	Apps	Goals	Apps	Goals	Apps	Goals	Apps	Goals
Sochaux	2018–19	Ligue 2	19	0	2	0	—		21	0
Sochaux	2019–20	Ligue 2	12	0	1	0	—		13	0
Sochaux	2020–21	Ligue 2	30	0	3	0	—		33	0
Sochaux	Total		61	0	6	0	—		67	0
Aris	2021–22	Super League Greece	8	1	—		—		8	1
Aris	2022–23	Super League Greece	23	1	3	0	2 (Note: Appearances in UEFA Europa Conference League)	0	28	1
Aris	2023–24	Super League Greece	0	0	0	0	2	0	2	0
Aris	Total		31	2	3	0	4	0	38	2
Career total			92	2	9	0	4	0	105	2
