= Deiradiotae =

Coordinates: 37°49′27″N 24°02′29″E

Deiradiotae or Deiradiotai (Ancient Greek: Δειραδιῶται) was a deme of ancient Attica, originally of the phyle of Leontis, but between 307/6 BCE to 201/0 BCE of the phyle of Antigonis, sending two delegates to the Boule.

Its site is tentatively located near modern el:Daskalio.
