= Rafael Camacho =

Portuguese footballer (born 2000)

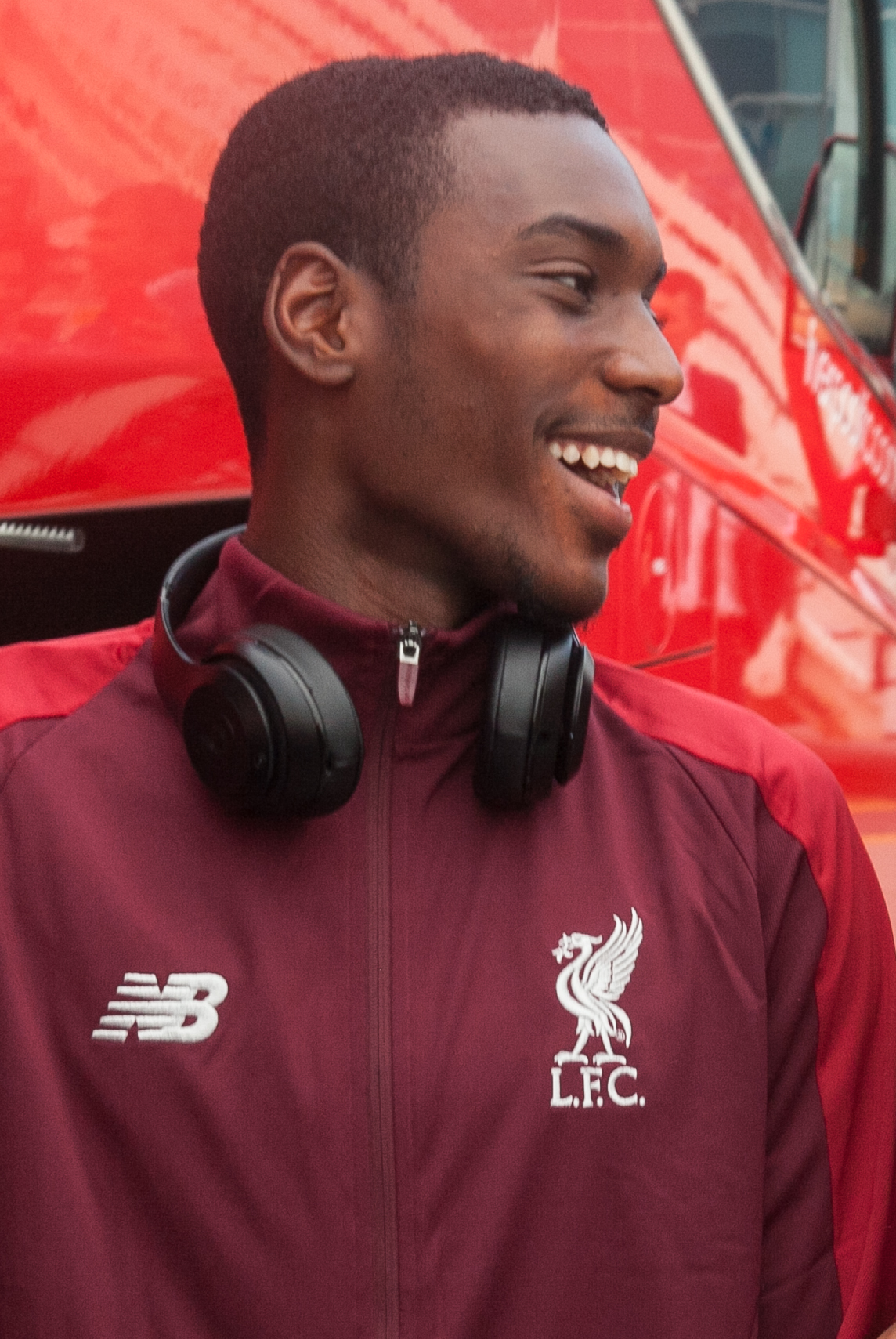
- Camacho with Liverpool in 2018

Personal information
- Full name: Rafael Euclides Soares Camacho
- Date of birth: 22 May 2000 (age 26)
- Place of birth: Lisbon, Portugal
- Height: 1.75 m (5 ft 9 in)
- Position: Winger

Team information
- Current team: União de Santarém
- Number: 64

Youth career
- 2008–2013: Sporting CP
- 2013–2016: Manchester City
- 2016: → Real S.C. (loan)
- 2016–2019: Liverpool

Senior career*
Years	Team	Apps	(Gls)
2018–2019	Liverpool	1	(0)
2019–2024	Sporting CP	19	(0)
2020–2021	Sporting CP B	7	(1)
2021	→ Rio Ave (loan)	11	(3)
2021–2022	→ B-SAD (loan)	16	(0)
2022–2023	→ Aris (loan)	25	(2)
2025	Vukovar 1991	9	(0)
2026	Ethnikos Achna	10	(1)
2026–	União de Santarém	3	(0)

International career^{‡}
2015–2016	Portugal U16	11	(3)
2016–2017	Portugal U17	9	(4)
2018	Portugal U18	3	(2)
2018–2019	Portugal U19	8	(0)
2018–2019	Portugal U20	6	(1)
- * Club domestic league appearances and goals as of 12 September 2026 ‡ National team caps and goals as of 00:10, 1 October 2019 (UTC)

Rafael Euclides Soares Camacho (born 22 May 2000) is a Portuguese professional footballer who plays as a winger for Liga 3 club União de Santarém.

== Club career ==
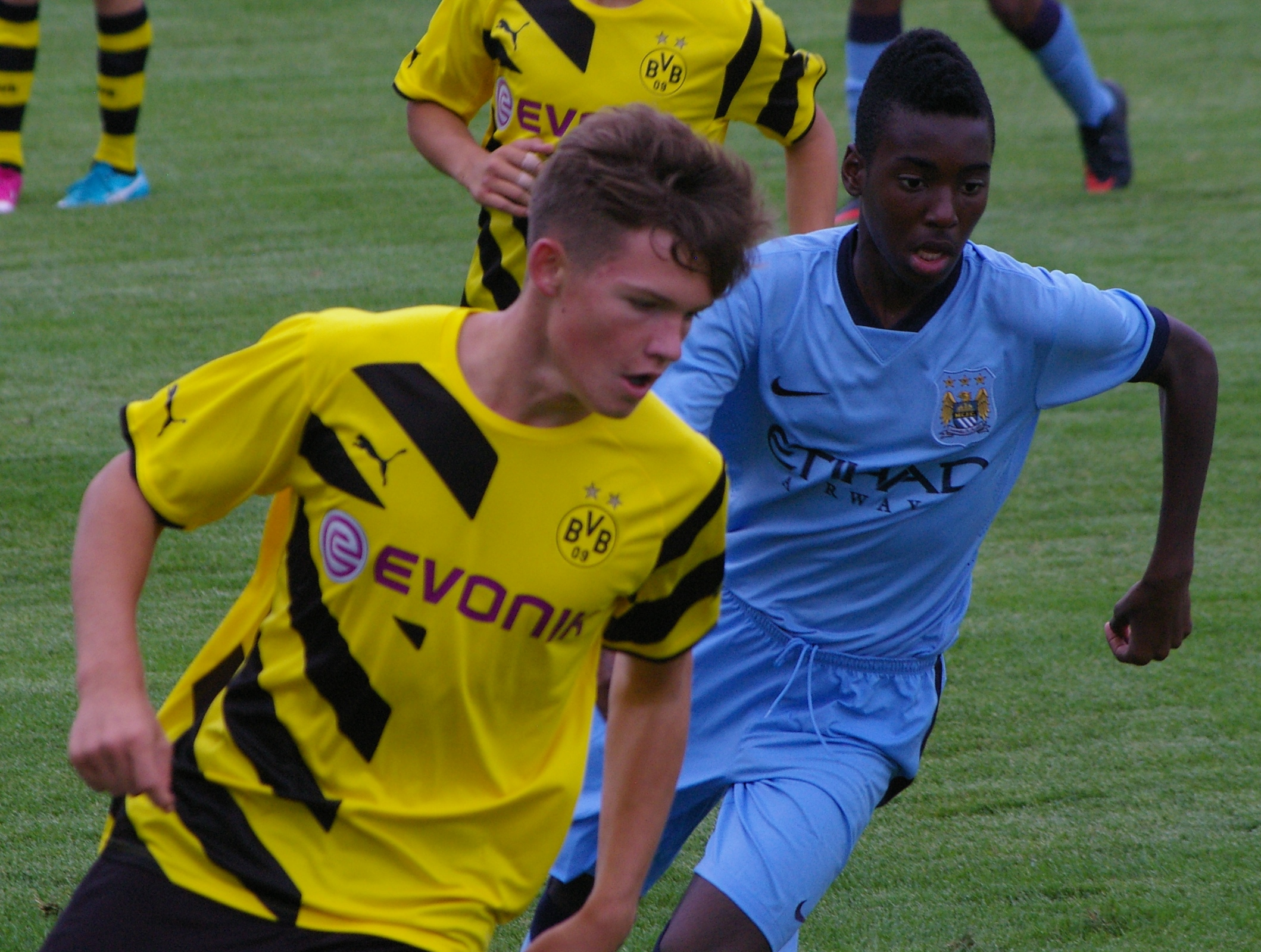
Camacho (right) playing for Manchester City in 2014.

=== Liverpool ===
Born in Lisbon of Angolan descent, Camacho joined Liverpool’s academy from Sporting CP at the end of the 2015–16 season following a successful trial. He is a versatile player who can play anywhere across the front line but had also featured at right back and wing back.

Camacho was named on the substitutes' bench for the Merseyside Derby against Everton in the Premier League on 7 April 2018 as a late injury replacement for Alberto Moreno but did not make an appearance. In December 2018 he was named on the bench for games against Burnley and Manchester United. He made his senior debut in the FA Cup third round against Wolverhampton Wanderers on 7 January 2019, and his league debut 12 days later, coming on as a late substitute in a 4–3 win over Crystal Palace.

=== Sporting CP ===
On 27 June 2019, Camacho rejoined Sporting CP on a five-year contract for a reported fee of £7 million.

=== Loan moves and later career ===
On 1 February 2021, Camacho agreed to a loan move to Rio Ave for the remainder of the season.

On 12 July 2022, he joined Aris on a season-long loan.

Camacho left Sporting in the summer of 2024. A year later, he joined Croatian Football League side HNK Vukovar 1991, before signing for Ethnikos Achna of the Cypriot First Division in early 2026.

== Career statistics ==
=== Club ===
As of match played 5 June 2023

Appearances and goals by club, season and competition
Club	Season	League			National Cup		League Cup		Europe		Other		Total	
Club	Season	League	Apps	Goals	Apps	Goals	Apps	Goals	Apps	Goals	Apps	Goals	Apps	Goals
Liverpool	2018–19	Premier League	1	0	1	0	0	0	0	0	—		2	0
Sporting	2019–20	Primeira Liga	19	0	0	0	3	1	4 (Note: Appearances in UEFA Europa League)	0	0	0	26	1
Sporting	2020–21	Primeira Liga	0	0	0	0	0	0	0	0	—		0	0
Sporting	Total		19	0	0	0	3	1	4	0	0	0	26	1
Sporting CP B	2020–21	Campeonato de Portugal	7	1	—		—		—		—		7	1
Rio Ave (loan)	2020–21	Primeira Liga	11	3	—		—		—		—		11	3
Belenenses (loan)	2021–22	Primeira Liga	16	0	1	0	0	0	—		—		17	0
Aris (loan)	2022–23	Superleague Greece	25	2	3	0	—		4	1	—		32	3
Career total			79	6	5	0	3	1	8	1	0	0	95	8
