= Tasos Tsokanis =

Greek footballer

Personal information
- Full name: Anastasios Tsokanis
- Date of birth: 2 May 1991 (age 35)
- Place of birth: Chalkida, Greece
- Height: 1.76 m (5 ft 9 in)
- Positions: Midfielder; left back

Team information
- Current team: Volos
- Number: 6

Senior career*
Years	Team	Apps	(Gls)
2009–2012	Iraklis Psachna	43	(8)
2012–2013	Kerkyra	21	(0)
2013–2014	Apollon Smyrnis	24	(0)
2014–2016	Asteras Tripolis	32	(1)
2016–2019	Panetolikos	56	(1)
2019–	Volos	159	(7)
- * Club domestic league appearances and goals as of 29 August 2026

Tasos Tsokanis (Greek: Τάσος Τσοκάνης; born 2 May 1991) is a Greek professional footballer who plays as a defensive midfielder or left back for Super League club Volos, for which he is captain.

== Career ==
Tsokanis started his career at Iraklis Psachna in 2009 and during his time there, the club won two consecutive promotions in three years, from the Delta Ethniki to the Football League. Until his contract was terminated in 2012, he made a total of 43 appearances and scored 8 goals for the club in the Football League and Football League 2.

In July 2012, he signed a two-year contract with Kerkyra in the Super League Greece. He made his debut at the league's opening match against Atromitos, coming as a substitute for Anestis Agritis in the 61st minute.

On 27 May 2014, he signed a three years' contract with Asteras Tripolis for an undisclosed fee.

On 7 June 2019, he joined Volos, signing a two-year contract, on a free transfer.

== Career statistics ==
=== Club ===
As of 12 May 2026

Club	Season	League			Cup		Continental		Total	
Club	Season	Division	Apps	Goals	Apps	Goals	Apps	Goals	Apps	Goals
Iraklis Psachna	2009–10	Gamma Ethniki			0	0	—			
Iraklis Psachna	2010–11	Super League Greece 2			0	0	—			
Iraklis Psachna	2011–12	Super League Greece 2	23	7	1	0	—		24	7
Iraklis Psachna	Total		23	7	1	0	0	0	24	7
Kerkyra	2012–13	Super League Greece	21	0	4	0	—		25	0
Apollon Smyrnis	2013–14	Super League Greece	24	0	3	0	—		27	0
Asteras Tripolis	2014–15	Super League Greece	27	1	4	1	4	0	35	2
Asteras Tripolis	2015–16	Super League Greece	5	0	6	0	2	0	13	0
Asteras Tripolis	Total		32	1	10	1	6	0	48	2
Panetolikos	2016–17	Super League Greece	23	0	3	0	—		26	0
Panetolikos	2017–18	Super League Greece	17	1	4	0	—		21	1
Panetolikos	2018–19	Super League Greece	16	0	1	0	—		17	0
Panetolikos	Total		56	1	8	0	0	0	64	1
Volos	2019–20	Super League Greece	31	4	3	0	—		34	0
Volos	2020–21	Super League Greece	18	1	4	0	—		22	2
Volos	2021–22	Super League Greece	27	0	2	0	—		29	2
Volos	2022–23	Super League Greece	27	3	1	0	—		28	2
Volos	2023–24	Super League Greece	25	0	2	0	—		27	0
Volos	2024–25	Super League Greece	20	0	2	0	—		22	0
Volos	2025–26	Super League Greece	10	0	1	0	—		11	0
Volos	Total		158	7	15	0	0	0	173	7
Career total			314	16	41	1	6	0	361	17
