= Christos Chatziioannou =

Greek footballer (born 2004)

Personal information
- Date of birth: 10 January 2004 (age 22)
- Place of birth: Thessaloniki, Greece
- Position: Forward

Team information
- Current team: Panathinaikos B
- Number: 47

Youth career
- 2016–2017: Iraklis
- 2017–2022: Aris

Senior career*
Years	Team	Apps	(Gls)
2022–2023	Aris	2	(0)
2023–	Panathinaikos B	4	(0)
- * Club domestic league appearances and goals as of 1 June 2024

Christos Chatziioannou (Greek: Χρήστος Χατζηιωάννου; born 10 January 2004) is a Greek professional footballer who plays as a forward for Super League 2 club Panathinaikos B.
