= Manu García (footballer, born 1998) =

Spanish footballer

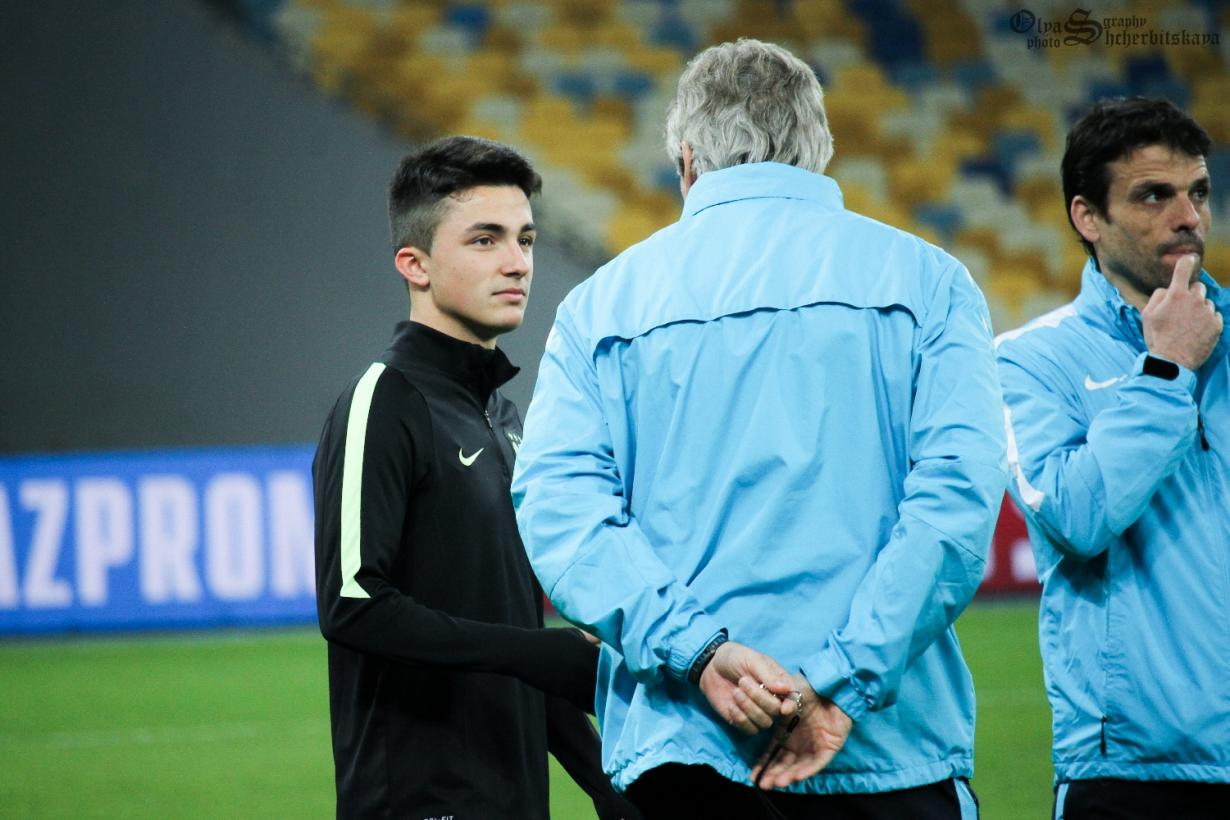

Personal information
- Full name: Manuel García Alonso
- Date of birth: 2 January 1998 (age 28)
- Place of birth: Oviedo, Spain
- Height: 1.69 m (5 ft 7 in)
- Positions: Attacking midfielder; winger

Team information
- Current team: Aris
- Number: 5

Youth career
- 2005–2010: Astur
- 2010–2014: Sporting Gijón
- 2014–2016: Manchester City

Senior career*
Years	Team	Apps	(Gls)
2015–2019	Manchester City	1	(0)
2016–2017	→ Alavés (loan)	0	(0)
2017–2019	→ NAC Breda (loan)	53	(3)
2018–2019	→ Toulouse (loan)	31	(0)
2019–2022	Sporting Gijón	75	(4)
2021–2022	→ Alavés (loan)	24	(0)
2022–2025	Aris	51	(9)
2025–2026	Sporting Kansas City	45	(4)
2026–	Aris	4	(1)

International career
2013	Spain U16	2	(0)
2015	Spain U17	1	(0)
2016–2017	Spain U19	5	(1)
2019–2021	Spain U21	10	(2)
2021	Spain	1	(0)
- * Club domestic league appearances and goals as of 19 September 2026

Manuel "Manu" García Alonso (Spanish pronunciation: [ˈmanu ɣaɾˈθi.a]; (Note: In isolation, García is pronounced [ɡaɾˈθi.a].) born 2 January 1998) is a Spanish professional footballer who plays as an attacking midfielder for Super League Greece club Aris.

== Club career ==
=== Early career ===
Born in Oviedo, Asturias, García joined Sporting Gijón's youth setup in 2010, aged 12, from Astur. On 2 May 2013, he agreed to a move to Manchester City, which paid €250,000 for his services in January, shortly after his 16th birthday.

=== Manchester City ===
García was initially assigned to the club's under-18 squad. In May 2015, shortly after being promoted to the under-21s, he was called up to the main squad by manager Manuel Pellegrini ahead of the year's North America pre-season tour.

On 27 May 2015, García made his senior debut for City, coming on as a late substitute for David Silva in a 1–0 friendly away win against Toronto FC. He also took part of the club's pre-season friendlies against Melbourne City, Roma, Vietnam and Stuttgart.

García made his professional debut on 22 September 2015, coming on as a 74th-minute substitute for Sergio Agüero in a 4–1 Football League Cup away routing of Sunderland. He went on to score the fifth goal in the 5–1 victory against Crystal Palace in the same competition. He made his Premier League debut against Aston Villa on 5 March 2016, replacing Yaya Touré.

On 1 December 2016, García signed a contract extension with Manchester City, keeping him with the club until June 2020.

==== Alavés (loan) ====
On 16 August 2016, García was loaned to Alavés, newly promoted to La Liga, for one year. He only made his debut on 1 December, as a substitute in a 3–0 win over Gimnàstic de Tarragona in the Copa del Rey.

==== NAC Breda (loan) ====
On 9 January 2017, García ended his season long loan short with Alavés and spent the rest of the season with Eerste Divisie side NAC Breda. He made his debut immediately, starting in a 2–0 win over Jong Utrecht on 16 January. García scored his first goal for the club on 6 February in a 1–0 win over Dordrecht.

García was loaned back to NAC Breda for the 2017–18 season on 30 June 2017.

==== Toulouse (loan) ====
García joined Toulouse on loan for the 2018–19 season.

=== Sporting Gijón ===
García rejoined his first club Sporting Gijón on 19 July 2019, signing a five-year contract and becoming the highest transfer in the club's history, as they paid €4 million for his services.

==== Return to Alavés (loan) ====
On 8 July 2021, García returned to Alavés, again in the top tier, also on loan.

=== Aris ===
On 24 July 2022, García signed a four-year contract with Aris for a club record fee of €4 million. He scored his first goal in a 3–0 home win against Asteras Tripolis, on 8 January 2023.

On 21 January 2023, García scored his first career hat-trick in a comfortable 3–0 home win against Volos.

== International career ==
Due to the isolation of some national team players following the positive COVID-19 test of Sergio Busquets, Spain's under-21 squad were called up for the international friendly against Lithuania on 8 June 2021. García made his senior debut in the match as Spain won 4–0.

== Career statistics ==
=== Club ===
As of match played on 21 January 2025

Appearances and goals by club, season and competition
Club	Season	League			National Cup		League Cup		Other		Total	
Club	Season	Division	Apps	Goals	Apps	Goals	Apps	Goals	Apps	Goals	Apps	Goals
Manchester City	2014–15	Premier League	0	0	0	0	0	0	0	0	0	0
Manchester City	2015–16	Premier League	1	0	1	0	2	1	0	0	4	1
Manchester City	Total		1	0	1	0	2	1	0	0	4	1
Alavés (loan)	2016–17	La Liga	0	0	1	0	—		—		1	0
NAC Breda (loan)	2016–17	Eerste Divisie	23	2	0	0	—		—		23	2
NAC Breda (loan)	2017–18	Eredivisie	34	1	1	0	—		—		35	1
NAC Breda (loan)	Total		57	3	1	0	—		—		58	3
Toulouse (loan)	2018–19	Ligue 1	34	1	1	0	—		—		35	1
Sporting Gijón	2019–20	Segunda División	40	3	0	0	—		—		40	3
Sporting Gijón	2020–21	Segunda División	35	1	1	0	—		—		36	1
Sporting Gijón	Total		75	4	1	0	—		—		76	4
Alavés (loan)	2021–22	La Liga	24	0	2	0	—		—		26	0
Aris	2022–23	Superleague Greece	17	4	2	0	—		2	0	21	4
Aris	2023–24	Superleague Greece	16	1	5	0	—		—		21	1
Aris	2024–25	Superleague Greece	18	4	2	0	—		—		20	4
Aris	Total		51	9	9	0	0	0	2	0	62	9
Career total			242	16	16	0	2	1	2	0	262	18

=== International ===
As of 8 June 2021

Appearances and goals by national team and year
National team	Year	Apps	Goals
Spain	2021	1	0
Total		1	0

== Honours ==
Individual

- Super League Greece Player of the Month: September 2024
