= Rafail Sgouros =

Greek footballer

Personal information
- Date of birth: 28 May 2004 (age 22)
- Place of birth: Angelochori, Imathia, Greece
- Position: Midfielder

Team information
- Current team: Kavala
- Number: 88

Youth career
- 2019–2022: Aris

Senior career*
| Years | Team | Apps | (Gls) |
| 2022–2023 | Aris | 5 | (0) |
| 2023–2024 | Olympiacos B | 24 | (1) |
| 2024–2025 | AEL | 2 | (0) |
| 2025 | Asteras Tripolis B | 5 | (0) |
| 2025– | Kavala | 10 | (0) |
- * Club domestic league appearances and goals as of 10 April 2026

Rafail Sgouros (Greek: Ραφαήλ Σγούρος; born 28 May 2004) is a Greek professional footballer who plays as a midfielder for Super League 2 club Kavala.
