= Pepe Castaño =

Spanish footballer

Personal information
- Full name: José Castaño Muñoz
- Date of birth: 10 December 1998 (age 27)
- Place of birth: Arcos de la Frontera, Spain
- Height: 1.85 m (6 ft 1 in)
- Position: Centre back

Team information
- Current team: Marko
- Number: 15

Youth career
- Xerez
- Cádiz
- 2015–2017: Villarreal

Senior career*
Years	Team	Apps	(Gls)
2014–2015	Cádiz B	16	(0)
2015	Cádiz	1	(0)
2016–2018	Villarreal C	44	(3)
2018–2020	Villarreal B	34	(1)
2019	Villarreal	0	(0)
2020–2026	Asteras Tripolis	129	(1)
2026–	Marko	0	(0)

International career
2015	Spain U17	1	(0)
2016	Spain U18	2	(0)
2016–2017	Spain U19	2	(0)
2016	Spain U20	6	(0)
- * Club domestic league appearances and goals as of 3 March 2026

José "Pepe" Castaño Muñoz (born 10 December 1998) is a Spanish professional footballer who plays as a central defender for Greek Super League 2 club Marko.

== Club career ==
Born in Arcos de la Frontera, Cádiz, Andalusia, Castaño represented Xerez CD and Cádiz CF as a youth. On 17 May 2015, after already making his senior debut for the latter's reserves, he made his first team debut by starting in a 0–3 Segunda División B away loss against Arroyo CP; at the age of 16 years, 5 months and 7 days, he became the youngest player ever to debut for the club.

On 22 July 2015, Castaño moved to Villarreal CF and returned to youth football. He was promoted to the C-team the following year, and reached the B-side in 2018.

Castaño made his professional debut on 17 January 2019, playing the full 90 minutes in a 1–3 loss at RCD Espanyol, for the season's Copa del Rey. On 25 August of the following year, he moved abroad after agreeing to a deal with Super League Greece side Asteras Tripolis FC.

On 1st July 2026 he was signed by the Super League Greece 2 side Marko.

== Career statistics ==
As of match played 29 February 2024

Club	Season	League			National cup		Continental		Other		Total	
Club	Season	Division	Apps	Goals	Apps	Goals	Apps	Goals	Apps	Goals	Apps	Goals
Cádiz	2014–15	Segunda División B	1	0	0	0	—		—		1	0
Villarreal	2018–19	La Liga	0	0	1	0	—		—		1	0
Villarreal B	2018–19	Segunda División B	22	1	—		—		—		22	1
Villarreal B	2019–20	Segunda División B	12	0	—		—		—		12	0
Villarreal B	Total		34	1	—		—		—		34	1
Asteras Tripolis	2020–21	Super League Greece	25	0	0	0	—		—		25	0
Asteras Tripolis	2021–22	Super League Greece	21	0	0	0	—		—		21	0
Asteras Tripolis	2022–23	Super League Greece	30	1	1	1	—		—		31	2
Asteras Tripolis	2023–24	Super League Greece	22	0	2	0	—		—		24	0
Asteras Tripolis	Total		98	1	3	1	0	0	—		101	2
Career total			133	2	4	1	0	0	0	0	137	3
