= Söchau =

- Municipality
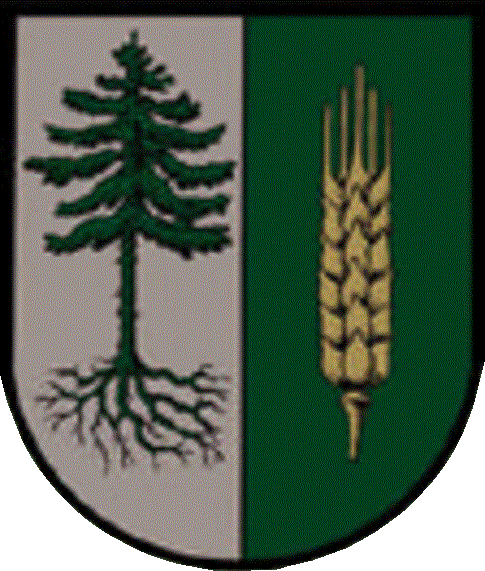
- Coat of arms

- Location within Austria
- Coordinates: 47°01′49″N 16°01′07″E
- Country: Austria
- State: Styria
- District: Hartberg-Fürstenfeld

Government
  - Mayor: Josef Kapper (ÖVP)

Area
  - Total: 18.18 km^{2} (7.02 sq mi)
- Elevation: 273 m (896 ft)

Population (2018-01-01)
  - Total: 1,413
  - Density: 77.72/km^{2} (201.3/sq mi)
- Time zone: UTC+1 (CET)
  - Summer (DST): UTC+2 (CEST)
- Postal code: 8362
- Area code: +43 3387
- Vehicle registration: FF
- Website: soechau.steiermark.at

Söchau is a municipality in the district of Hartberg-Fürstenfeld in Styria, Austria.
