= Cropia (Attica) =

Deme of ancient Attica

Coordinates: 38°05′23″N 23°41′39″E

Cropia or Kropia (Ancient Greek: Κρωπία) or Cropeia or Kropeia (Κρωπειά), also known as Cropidae or Kropidai, was a deme (or suburb/subdivision) of ancient Attica.

The site of Cropia is located west of modern Ano Liosia.
