= Eupyridae =

Coordinates: 38°03′59″N 23°42′41″E

Eupyridae or Eupyridai (Ancient Greek: Εὐπυρίδαι) was a deme of ancient Attica.

The site of Eupyridae is tentatively located near modern Kamatero.
