= Peristeri =

Peristeri Περιστέρι
- Municipality
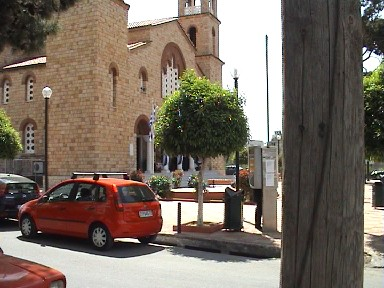
- Saint John church

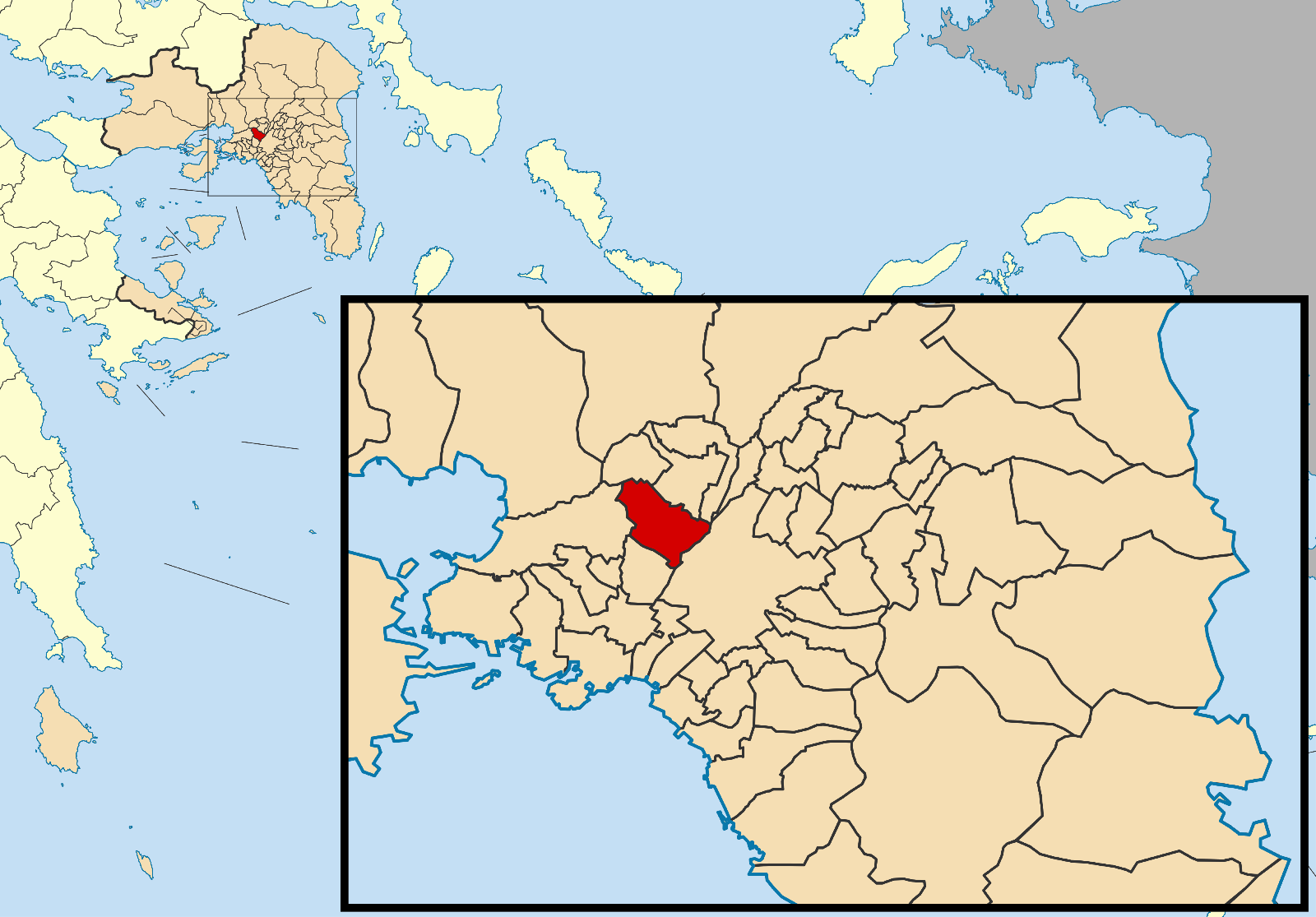

- Location within Greece
- Coordinates: 38°1′N 23°41′E
- Country: Greece
- Administrative region: Attica
- Regional unit: West Athens
- Districts: 4

Government
  - Mayor: Andreas Pachatouridis (since 2003)

Area
  - Municipality: 10.05 km^{2} (3.88 sq mi)
- Elevation: 50 m (160 ft)

Population (2021)
  - Municipality: 133,630
  - Density: 13,300/km^{2} (34,440/sq mi)
- Time zone: UTC+2 (EET)
  - Summer (DST): UTC+3 (EEST)
- Postal code: 121 xx, 126 xx
- Area code: 210
- Vehicle registration: Y, Z, I
- Website: www.peristeri.gr

Peristeri (Greek: Περιστέρι, meaning "pigeon/dove" in Greek) is a city and a suburban municipality in the western part of the Athens agglomeration, Greece. With 133,630 inhabitants (2021 census), it ranks as the seventh-largest city and municipality in Greece by population.

== History ==
The ancient deme Leuconoe is believed to have been located at Peristeri.

== Geography ==
Peristeri is located about 4 km (2 mi) northwest of the centre of Athens. It lies between the Mount Aigaleo in the northwest and the Cephissus river in the southeast. The municipality has an area of 10.50 square kilometres (4.05 sq mi). Its built-up area is continuous with that of central Athens and the neighbouring suburbs Aigaleo, Chaidari, Petroupoli, Ilion, and Agioi Anargyroi.

=== Transportation ===
The A1 motorway (Athens–Thessaloniki–Evzonoi) passes through the southeastern part of the municipality. Athinon Avenue (Greek National Road 8 Athens-Korinthos-Patras) passes through the southwestern part. Peristeri is served by three Athens metro stations on Line 2: Anthoupoli, Peristeri, and Agios Antonios. The Kifissos Bus Terminal where long-distance buses from Peloponnese, Epirus, Macedonia, Ionian Islands, and Thrace arrive, stands at the east border of Peristeri near Sepolia.

== Historical population ==
Year	Population
1991	137,288
2001	137,918
2011	139,981
2021	133,630

== Sports ==
The most important sports clubs that are based in Peristeri are Atromitos, that has had a presence in the Super League Greece and in the UEFA Europa League, and Peristeri, that has had a long-time presence in the Greek Basketball League and in several European-wide competitions, such as the EuroLeague, the FIBA Basketball Champions League, the FIBA Korac Cup, and the FIBA Europe Cup.

Notable sport clubs based in Peristeri
Club	Founded	Sports	Achievements
Atromitos	1923	Football	Presence in the Super League Greece and the UEFA Europa League
Peristeri	1971	Basketball	Presence in the Greek Basketball League and the EuroLeague

=== Peristeri Arena ===
The Peristeri Arena (or Andreas Papandreou Arena), is an indoor basketball sporting arena. The seating capacity of the arena is 4,000 people. The arena is owned by the municipality of Peristeri. The arena is currently home to the Greek professional basketball team Peristeri Athens, of the Greek Basketball League.

The arena was opened in the year 1989. The arena is named after the late Andreas Papandreou, who was a former prime minister of Greece. The arena is an older, smaller version of the Larissa Neapolis Arena and the Dimitris Tofalos Arena, which were based on Peristeri Arena, but were built 6 years later, and with larger seating capacities.

== Landmarks ==
- Cathedral
- Peristeri Arena
- Peristeri Stadium
- Town Hall

== Culture ==
Peristeri has one municipal outdoor cinema and four municipal theatres.

== Economy at 1900s ==
On November 5, 1933, the establishment of the company "Lignitoryheia Attikis S.A." was announced, with the aim of exploiting the coal deposits in the area. Mining began two years later.

== Notable people ==
- Angela Dimitriou, singer
- Evangelos Koronios, professional basketball player and coach
- Giannis Poulopoulos, singer-songwriter
- Grigoris Bithikotsis (1922–2005), singer and songwriter
- Nikoleta Kyriakopoulou (born 1986), Pole vault athlete
- Vangelis Ploios, actor
- Vangelis Mantzaris, basketball player
- Leonidas Michailidis, brain surgeon
- Orfeas Tzortzopoulos, drummer of Suicidal Angels
- Argiris Pedoulakis, professional basketball player and coach
- Demostene Russo
- Konstantinos Argiros, singer

== International relations ==
Peristeri is twinned with:

- Iaşi, Romania
- Rousse, Bulgaria
