= Peleces =

Coordinates: 38°07′03″N 23°40′24″E

Peleces or Pelekes (Ancient Greek: Πήληκες, romanized: Pēlēkes) were three demoi of ancient Attica, forming a community, as τρίκωμοι, and probably, therefore, adjacent. If the reading in Thucydides is correct, διὰ Κρωπειᾶς, these demoi should be placed in the north of the Athenian plain, but many editors read διὰ Κεκροπίας.

The site of Peleces is tentatively located near modern Chasia.
