= Apostolos Terzis =

Greek footballer

Personal information
- Date of birth: 13 March 1971 (age 55)
- Place of birth: Veria, Greece
- Position: Defender

Senior career*
Years	Team	Apps	(Gls)
1993–1995	Doxa Drama		

Managerial career
- 2014: Lefkadia
- 2015–2017: Veria (youth)
- 2017: Veria (caretaker)
- 2017: Sparta
- 2018: Veria (caretaker)
- 2018–2023: Aris (assistant)
- 2018: Aris (caretaker)
- 2019: Aris (caretaker)
- 2020: Aris (caretaker)
- 2022: Aris (caretaker)
- 2023: Aris
- 2024: Kalamata
- 2024–2025: Diagoras
- 2025–2026: Ayia Napa
- 2026: Egaleo
- * Club domestic league appearances and goals

Apostolos Terzis (Greek: Απόστολος Τερζής; born 13 March 1971) is a Greek professional football manager.

== Managerial career ==
After an undistinguished player career he became head coach of Veria's youth team in 2015. During his two years there, he also stepped in as caretaker manager for Veria's first team. In the summer of 2017 he was briefly manager of Sparta, followed by another short tenure as caretaker manager of Veria in the winter of 2018. In the summer of 2018 he signed on as assistant manager of Aris, ending up as caretaker there as well, first in November 2018, then in September–October 2019.

Managerial record by team and tenure
Team	Nat	From	To	Record				
Team	Nat	From	To	G	W	D	L	Win %
Aris	(Greece)	5 November 2018	12 November 2018	1	1	0	0	100.00
Aris	(Greece)	31 August 2019	14 October 2019	4	1	1	2	25.00
Aris	(Greece)	18 September 2020	20 September 2020	1	1	0	0	100.00
Aris	(Greece)	17 February 2022	20 February 2022	1	0	1	0	0.00
Aris	(Greece)	6 February 2023	29 August 2023	21	8	3	10	38.10
Kalamata	(Greece)	30 January 2024	30 March 2024	7	3	2	2	42.86
Diagoras	(Greece)	14 October 2024	5 May 2025	22	6	7	9	27.27
Ayia Napa	(Cyprus)	1 July 2025	12 January 2026	16	7	5	4	43.75
Egaleo	(Greece)	11 February 2026	26 April 2026	9	5	2	2	55.56
Total				82	32	21	29	39.02
