= 2019–20 Konyaspor season =

Konyaspor
2019–20 season
- Chairman: Hilmi Kulluk
- Manager: Bülent Korkmaz
- Stadium: Konya Büyükşehir Stadium
- Süper Lig: 13th
- Turkish Cup: Fourth round
Home colours	Away colours	Third colours

The 2019–20 season was Konyaspor's 98th year in existence. In addition to the domestic league, Konyaspor participated in the Turkish Cup.

== Squad ==
As of 30 March 2020

Note: Flags indicate national team as defined under FIFA eligibility rules; some limited exceptions apply. Players may hold more than one non-FIFA nationality.

No.	Pos.	Nation	Player
1	GK	TUR	Serkan Kırıntılı
2	MF	TUR	Volkan Fındıklı
3	DF	SEN	Fallou Diagne
4	DF	TUR	Ali Turan
5	DF	TUR	Selim Ay
6	MF	DEN	Jens Jønsson
7	MF	TUR	Ömer Ali Şahiner
8	MF	SRB	Marko Jevtović
10	FW	BIH	Riad Bajić (on loan from Udinese)
11	MF	BIH	Deni Milošević
12	DF	BRA	Guilherme Sityá
14	DF	BIH	Marin Aničić
15	DF	TUR	Uğur Demirok
16	MF	PER	Paolo Hurtado

No.	Pos.	Nation	Player
17	GK	TUR	Ertuğrul Taşkıran
18	MF	BIH	Amir Hadžiahmetović
19	MF	GEO	Levan Shengelia
21	MF	UGA	Farouk Miya
25	DF	TUR	Alper Uludağ
32	MF	TUR	Ali Karakaya
35	GK	TUR	Ozan Can Oruç
61	GK	TUR	Mücahit Atalay
77	MF	TUR	Şener Kaya
87	DF	TUR	Ferhat Öztorun
88	FW	MKD	Erdon Daci
89	DF	SVN	Nejc Skubic
99	FW	BRA	Thuram

== Süper Lig ==
=== League table ===
Pos	Team	Pld	W	D	L	GF	GA	GD	Pts
11	Göztepe	34	11	9	14	44	49	−5	42
12	Gençlerbirliği	34	9	9	16	39	56	−17	36 (Note: Head-to-head points: Gençlerbirliği 4, Konyaspor 1)
13	Konyaspor	34	8	12	14	36	52	−16	36
14	Denizlispor	34	9	8	17	31	48	−17	35 (Note: Head-to-head points: Denizlispor 4, Rizespor 1)
15	Rizespor	34	10	5	19	38	57	−19	35

Source: Süper Lig, Soccerway
Rules for classification: 1) Points; 2) Head-to-head points; 3) Head-to-head goal difference; 4) Head-to-head goals scored; 5) Goal difference; 6) Goals scored; 7) Play-off.

=== Results summary ===
Overall								Home						Away					
Pld	W	D	L	GF	GA	GD	Pts	W	D	L	GF	GA	GD	W	D	L	GF	GA	GD
32	7	12	13	30	46	−16	33	4	7	5	14	19	−5	3	5	8	16	27	−11

Source: TFF

=== Results by round ===
Round	1	2	3	4	5	6	7	8	9	10	11	12	13	14	15	16	17	18	19	20	21	22	23	24	25	26	27	28	29	30	31	32	33	34
Ground	H	A	H	A	A	H	A	H	A	H	A	H	A	H	A	H	A	A	H	A	H	H	A	H	A	H	A	H	A	H	A	H	A	H
Result	D	D	D	W	L	W	W	L	L	D	L	L	L	D	D	L	L	W	L	D	D	L	D	D	D	W	L	D	L	W	L	W		
Position	10	11	13	9	10	6	4	8	9	10	12	14	14	14	15	15	15	14	14	14	14	15	15	15	15	14	15	16	17	15	17	14		

Updated to match(es) played on 16 July 2020. Source: TFF.org
A = Away; H = Home; W = Win; D = Draw; L = Loss

== Matches ==
18 August 2019 1	Konyaspor	0 - 0	MKE Ankaragücü	Konya
19.15		Report	(yellow card) 24' İlhan Parlak; (yellow card) 90' Ricardo Faty	Stadium: Büyükşehir Belediye Stadyumu; Referee: Bülent Birincioğlu; Assistant referees: Mehmet Metin, Mehmet Kısal; Fourth official: Yakup Özhan; Goal-line assistants: Özgür Yankaya, Hakan Ceylan

25 August 2019 2	Galatasaray	1 - 1	Konyaspor	Istanbul
21.45	Ryan Babel 60'; Jean Michaël Seri (red card) 75'; Adem Büyük (yellow card) 87'	Report	(yellow card) 14' Erdon Daci; (yellow card) 50' Ali Turan; (yellow card) 77' Ferhat Öztorun; 90' Jens Jønsson	Stadium: Türk Telekom Stadium; Referee: Mete Kalkavan; Assistant referees: Ceyhun Sesigüzel, Esat Sancaktar; Fourth official: Kutluhan Bilgiç; Goal-line assistants: Mustafa Öğretmenoğlu, Kerem Ersoy

31 August 2019 3	Konyaspor	2 - 2	Antalyaspor	Konya
19.15	Riad Bajić 60'; Farouk Miya 75'; Marko Jevtović (yellow card) 84'; Ömer Ali Şahiner (yellow card) 90'	Report	16' (pen.) Serdar Özkan; (yellow card) 58' Gustavo Blanco Leschuk; 84' Paul Mukairu; (yellow card) 90' Ruud Boffin	Stadium: Büyükşehir Belediye Stadyumu; Referee: Ümit Öztürk; Assistant referees: Osman Gökhan Bilir, Kamil Çetin; Fourth official: Erkan Engin; Goal-line assistants: Özgüç Türkalp, Emre Malok

15 September 2019 4	Denizlispor	0 - 1	Konyaspor	Denizli
20.00	Isaac Sackey (yellow card) 19'; Zakarya Bergdich (yellow card) 33'; Hugo Rodallega (yellow card) 72'; Radosław Murawski (yellow card) 73'	Report	(yellow card) 41' Ali Turan; 54' Farouk Miya; (yellow card) 80' Deni Milošević	Stadium: Atatürk Stadyumu; Referee: Ali Şansalan; Assistant referees: İsmail Şencan, Murat Engin Gözütok; Fourth official: Selim Özen; Goal-line assistants: Zorbay Küçük, Atilla Karaoğlan

20 September 2019 5	Göztepe	1 - 0	Konyaspor	İzmir
20.30	André Biyogo Poko (red card) 50'; Alpaslan Öztürk 76' (pen.); Beto (yellow card) 90'	Report	(yellow card) 73' Farouk Miya; (yellow card) 75' Amir Hadžiahmetović; (yellow card) 75' Marin Aničić	Stadium: Bornova Stadium; Attendance: 8.054; Referee: Özgür Yankaya; Assistant referees: Mehmet Metin, Abdullah Bora Özkara; Fourth official: Yalçın Taşkınfurat; Goal-line assistants: Volkan Bayarslan, Kadir Sağlam

29 September 2019 6	Konyaspor	2 - 1	Kayserispor	Konya
14.00	Alper Uludağ (yellow card) 41'; Deni Milošević 45'; Marin Aničić (yellow card) 70'; Marko Jevtović 90'; Nejc Skubic (yellow card) 90+3'; Ömer Ali Şahiner (yellow card) 90+5'	Report	9' (k.k.) Levan Shengelia; (yellow card) 10' Bilal Başaçıkoğlu; (yellow card) 89' Miguel Lopes; (yellow card) 90+2' Silviu Lung Jr. (yellow card) 90+5' Pedro Henrique Konzen	Stadium: Büyükşehir Belediye Stadyumu; Attendance: 14.671; Referee: Alper Ulusoy; Assistant referees: Volkan Ahmet Narinç, Bahtiyar Birinci; Fourth official: Batuhan Gültek; Goal-line assistants: Hakan Ceylan, Çağraş Altay

5 October 2019 7	Kasımpaşa	1 - 4	Konyaspor	Istanbul
15.00	Karim Hafez (yellow card) 29'; Veysel Sarı 45+2' (yellow card) 59'; Fatih Öztürk (yellow card) 62'; Jorge Filipe Oliveira Fernandes (yellow card) 68'; Ricardo Quaresma (yellow card) 89'	Report	19' Ömer Ali Şahiner; (yellow card) 22' Jens Jønsson; (yellow card) 25' Nejc Skubic; 44' (pen.) Marko Jevtović; 45' (pen.) 63' (pen.) Farouk Miya; (yellow card) 51' Deni Milošević; (yellow card) 85' Alper Uludağ	Stadium: Recep Tayyip Erdoğan Stadium; Attendance: 2.503; Referee: Serkan Tokat; Assistant referees: Cem Satman, Mustafa Sönmez; Fourth official: Ferhan Kestanlıoğlu; Goal-line assistants: Ali Palabıyık, Yasin Kol

21 October 2019 8	Konyaspor	0 - 2	Yeni Malatyaspor	Konya
20.00	Serkan Kırıntılı (red card) 1'; Marko Jevtović (yellow card) 24'	Report	4' Guilherme Costa Marques; (yellow card) 12' Mustafa Akbaş; 52' Robin Yalçın; (yellow card) 65' Issam Chebake	Stadium: Büyükşehir Belediye Stadyumu; Attendance: 19.773; Referee: Mustafa Öğretmenoğlu; Assistant referees: Candaş Elbil, Mehmet Salih Mazlum; Fourth official: Adem Sarıtaş; Goal-line assistants: Mete Kalkavan, Ceyhun Sesigüzel

26 October 2019 9	Fenerbahçe	5 - 1	Konyaspor	Istanbul
20.00	Garry Rodrigues 11'; Zanka 14'; Ozan Tufan 28'; Luiz Gustavo 78'; Vedat Muriqi 82'; Luiz Gustavo (yellow card) 86'	Report	16' (o.g.) Serdar Aziz; (yellow card) 30' Farouk Miya	Stadium: Şükrü Saracoğlu Stadyumu; Attendance: 39.581; Referee: Ali Şansalan; Assistant referees: Kemal Yılmaz, İsmail Şencan; Fourth official: Alper Çetin; Goal-line assistants: Halil Umut Meler, Cevdet Kömürcüoğlu

2 November 2019 10	Konyaspor	1 - 1	Gençlerbirliği	Konya
15.00	Farouk Miya 37'; Riad Bajić (yellow card) 88'	Report	(yellow card) 40' Pierre-Yves Polomat; (yellow card) 85' Nadir Çiftçi; 90+3' Yasin Pehlivan	Stadium: Büyükşehir Belediye Stadyumu; Attendance: 11.884; Referee: Volkan Bayarslan; Assistant referees: İlker Takpak, Abdullah Bora Özkara; Fourth official: Burak Taşkınsoy; Goal-line assistants: Atilla Karaoğlan, Murat Erdoğan

9 November 2019 11	Sivasspor	2 - 0	Konyaspor	Sivas
17.30	Fatih Aksoy (yellow card) 52'; Emre Kılınç 80'; Hakan Arslan 89'	Report	(yellow card) 65' Amir Hadžiahmetović; (yellow card) 75' (yellow card) 78' (red card) Levan Shengelia; (yellow card) 87' Marin Aničić	Stadium: New Sivas 4 Eylül Stadium; Attendance: 10.161; Referee: Mete Kalkavan; Assistant referees: Ceyhun Sesigüzel, Esat Sancaktar; Fourth official: Bülent Birincioğlu; Goal-line assistants: Koray Gençerler, Erkan Özdamar

23 November 2019 12	Konyaspor	0 - 1	Beşiktaş	Konya
20.00	Ferhat Öztorun (yellow card) 46'; Jens Jønsson (yellow card) 78'; Erdon Daci (yellow card) 90+3'	Report	(yellow card) 54' Mohamed Elneny; 71' Burak Yılmaz	Stadium: Büyükşehir Belediye Stadyumu; Attendance: 23.405; Referee: Fırat Aydınus; Assistant referees: Aleks Taşçıoğlu, Süleyman Özay; Fourth official: Turgut Doman; Goal-line assistants: Serkan Tokat, Serkan Olguncan

30 November 2019 13	Çaykur Rizespor	3 - 1	Konyaspor	Rize
15.00	Oğulcan Çağlayan 3'; Aminu Umar 10'; Yan Sasse 74'	Report	11' Deni Milošević	Stadium: Yeni Rize Şehir Stadium; Attendance: 5.417; Referee: Halis Özkahya; Assistant referees: Ekrem Kan, İbrahim Bozbey; Fourth official: Abdullah Buğra Taşkınsoy; Goal-line assistants: Mustafa Öğretmenoğlu, Cevdet Kömürcüoğlu

8 December 2019 14	Konyaspor	0 - 0	Gaziantep	Konya
14.00	Deni Milošević (yellow card) 29'; Selim Ay (yellow card) 88'	Report	(yellow card) 53' Jefferson Nogueira Júnior	Stadium: Büyükşehir Belediye Stadyumu; Attendance: 11.041; Referee: Ali Palabıyık; Assistant referees: Mehmet Cem Satman, Mustafa Sönmez; Fourth official: Şeref Taştan; Goal-line assistants: Özgüç Türkalp, Emre Malok

16 December 2019 15	İstanbul Başakşehir	1 - 1	Konyaspor	Istanbul
20.00	Carlos Ponck 26'	Report	(yellow card) 52' Marin Aničić; (yellow card) 58' Ferhat Öztorun; 63' Deni Milošević; (yellow card) 90+1' Nejc Skubic	Stadium: Başakşehir Fatih Terim Stadium; Attendance: 2.138; Referee: Hüseyin Göçek; Assistant referees: Alpaslan Dedeş, İlker Takpak; Fourth official: Mustafa İlker Çoşkun; Goal-line assistants: Alper Ulusoy, İbrahim Çağlar Uyarcan

23 December 2019 16	Konyaspor	0 - 1	Trabzonspor	Konya
20.00	Ömer Ali Şahiner (yellow card) 21', (yellow card) 82' (red card); Ali Turan (yellow card) 24'; Nejc Skubic (yellow card) 69'; Selim Ay (yellow card) 90+3'	Report	38' Alexander Sørloth; (yellow card) 66' John Obi Mikel; (yellow card) 80' Yusuf Sari	Stadium: Büyükşehir Belediye Stadyumu; Attendance: 16.009; Referee: Halil Umut Meler; Assistant referees: İbrahim Çağlar Uyarcan, İbrahim Bozbey; Fourth official: Kutluhan Bilgiç; Goal-line assistants: Özgür Yankaya, Ceyhun Sesigüzel

29 December 2019 17	Alanyaspor	2 - 1	Konyaspor	Alanya, Antalya
16.30	Papiss Cissé 35', 90'; Ceyhun Gülselam (yellow card) 55'	Report	8' Erdon Daci; (yellow card) 51' Serkan Kırıntılı; (yellow card) 67' Selim Ay; (yellow card) 75' Ali Turan; (yellow card) 90' Mücahit Can Akçay	Stadium: Bahçeşehir Okulları Stadium; Attendance: 4.771; Referee: Ümit Öztürk; Assistant referees: Özgür Ertem, Osman Gökhan Bilir; Fourth official: Hakan Ülker; Goal-line assistants: Halis Özkahya, Özgüç Türkalp

17 January 2020 18	MKE Ankaragücü	0 - 1	Konyaspor	Ankara
20.00		Report	(yellow card) 35' Deni Milošević; 90+2' Levan Shengelia	Stadium: Eryaman Stadium; Attendance: 9.820; Referee: Alper Ulusoy; Assistant referees: Samet Çavuş, Abdullah Bora Özkara; Fourth official: Yalçın Taşkınfurat; Goal-line assistants: Tugay Kaan Numanoğlu, Oğuzhan Uğurlu

26 January 2020 19	Konyaspor	0 - 3	Galatasaray	Konya
19:00		Report	25' Radamel Falcao; 38' Emre Akbaba; (yellow card) 41' Sofiane Feghouli; (yellow card) 62' Mario Lemina; 78' Adem Büyük	Stadium: Büyükşehir Belediye Stadyumu; Attendance: 26.081; Referee: Koray Gençerler; Assistant referees: Bahattin Duran, Volkan Ahmet Narinç; Fourth official: Caner Ak; Goal-line assistants: Serkan Tokat, Kerem Ersoy

1 February 2020 20	Antalyaspor	0 - 0	Konyaspor	Antalya
14.00	Bünyamin Balcı (yellow card) 69'; Veysel Sarı (yellow card) 73'; Charles Fernando Basílio da Silva (yellow card) 90+3'	Report		Stadium: New Antalya Stadium; Attendance: 11.393; Referee: Halis Özkahya; Assistant referees: Serkan Ok, Süleyman Özay; Fourth official: Mustafa İlker Çoşkun; Goal-line assistants: Abdulkadir Bitigen, Yasin Kol

8 February 2020 21	Konyaspor	0 - 0	Denizlispor	Konya
14.00	Nejc Skubic (yellow card) 30'; Selim Ay (yellow card) 81'	Report	(yellow card) 76' Olcay Şahan	Stadium: Büyükşehir Belediye Stadyumu; Attendance: 8.511; Referee: Volkan Bayarslan; Assistant referees: Özgür Ertem, Mehmet Salih Mazlum; Fourth official: Sinan Dereci; Goal-line assistants: Özgür Yankaya, Ramazan Keleş

15 February 2020 22	Konyaspor	1 - 3	Göztepe	Konya
17.00	Guilherme Sityá (yellow card) 28'; Ömer Ali Şahiner 34'; Marko Jevtović (yellow card) 51'	Report	39' Serdar Gürler; 68' André Castro; 74' Halil Akbunar	Stadium: Büyükşehir Belediye Stadyumu; Attendance: 14.366; Referee: Ali Şansalan; Assistant referees: Alpaslan Dedeş, Mehmet Cem Hanoğlu; Fourth official: Selim Özen; Goal-line assistants: Özgüç Türkalp, Erkan Engin

22 February 2020 23	Kayserispor	2 - 2	Konyaspor	Kayseri
14.00	Bernard Mensah (yellow card) 22'; Cristian Săpunaru (yellow card) 23'; Artem Kravets 45+2'; Pedro Henrique Konzen 87'; Cenk Şahin (yellow card) 90+2'	Report	8' Ömer Ali Şahiner; (yellow card) 23' Deni Milošević; (yellow card) 40' , (goal) 44' Amir Hadžiahmetović; (yellow card) 65' Róbert Mak; (yellow card) 74' Jens Jønsson; (yellow card) 76' Thuram	Stadium: Kadir Has Şehir Stadyumu; Attendance: 7.262; Referee: Arda Kardeşler; Assistant referees: Cevdet Kömürcüoğlu, Bahtiyar Birinci; Fourth official: Emre Kargın; Goal-line assistants: Emre Malok Murat Erdoğan

29 February 2020 24	Konyaspor	0 - 0	Kasımpaşa	Konya
14.00	Paolo Hurtado (yellow card) 90'	Report		Stadium: Büyükşehir Belediye Stadyumu; Attendance: 8.624; Referee: Ali Palabıyık; Assistant referees: Serkan Olguncan, Mustafa Sönmez; Fourth official: Burak Olcar; Goal-line assistants: Fırat Aydınus, Oğuzhan Uğurlu

7 March 2020 25	Yeni Malatyaspor	1 - 1	Konyaspor	Malatya
14.00	Issam Chebake (red card) 45+3'; Mustafa Akbaş (yellow card) 66'; Murat Yıldırım 80'	Report	(yellow card) 45+1' Levan Shengelia; 45+5' (pen.) Riad Bajić; (yellow card) 79' Nejc Skubic; (red card) 88' Serkan Kırıntılı	Stadium: Malatya Arena; Attendance: 5.690; Referee: Cüneyt Çakır; Assistant referees: Bahattin Duran, Tarık Ongun; Fourth official: Sinan Dereci; Goal-line assistants: Özkür Yankaya, Kadir Sağlam

14 March 2020 26	Konyaspor	1 - 0	Fenerbahçe	Konya
20.00	Selim Ay (yellow card) 10'; Uğur Demirok (yellow card) 31'; Riad Bajić 41'; Nejc Skubic (yellow card) 46' (yellow card) 67' (red card); Ömer Ali Şahiner (yellow card) 55' (yellow card) 77' (red card); Ertuğrul Taşkıran (yellow card) 88'	Report	(yellow card) 39' Hasan Ali Kaldırım; (yellow card) 84' Garry Rodrigues	Stadium: Büyükşehir Belediye Stadyumu; Attendance: 0 Referee: Hüseyin Göçek; Assistant referees: Serkan Ok, Esat Sancaktar; Fourth official: Mert Güzenge; Goal-line assistants: Koray Gençerler, İbrahim Çağlar Uyarcan

14 June 2020 27	Gençlerbirliği	2 - 1	Konyaspor	Ankara
18.30	Giovanni Sio 59'; Berat Özdemir 83'; Erdem Özgenç (yellow card) 90'; Flávio Ramos (yellow card) 90+1'	Report	(yellow card) 43' Marin Aničić; 62' Marko Jevtović; (yellow card) 73' Ali Turan	Stadium: Eryaman Stadium; Attendance: 0 Referee: Alper Ulusoy; Assistant referees: İsmail Şencan, Deniz Caner Özaral; Fourth official: Adem Cinek; Goal-line assistants: Suat Arslanboğa, Murat Erdoğan

21 June 2020 28	Konyaspor	2 - 2	Sivasspor	Konya
21.00	Levan Shengelia (yellow card) 4'; Nejc Skubic 37' (yellow card) 48'; Deni Milošević 44'; Selim Ay (yellow card) 77'	Report	30' (yellow card) 32' Arouna Koné; 90+1' Petar Škuletić	Stadium: Büyükşehir Belediye Stadyumu; Attendance: 0 Referee: Halil Umut Meler; Assistant referees: Cevdet Kömürcüoğlu, Ekrem Kan; Fourth official: Murat Erdoğan; Goal-line assistants: Bahattin Şimşek, Emre Kargın

26 June 2020 29	Beşiktaş	3 - 0	Konyaspor	Istanbul
21.00	Domagoj Vida (yellow card) 34'; Burak Yılmaz 40'; Abdoulay Diaby 45+2'; Jeremain Lens 52'; Rıdvan Yılmaz (yellow card) 87'; Tyler Boyd (yellow card) 87'	Report	(red card) 15' Amir Hadžiahmetović	Stadium: Vodafone Park; Attendance: 0 Referee: Zorbay Küçük; Assistant referees: Alpaslan Dedeş, Kamil Çetin; Fourth official: Ramazan Keleş; Goal-line assistants: Ümit Öztürk, Yakup Özhan

5 July 2020 30	Konyaspor	1 - 0	Çaykur Rizespor	Konya
21.00	Jens Jønsson (yellow card) 36'; Marin Aničić (yellow card) 83'; Farouk Miya 90+5' (pen.)	Report	(yellow card) 46' Montassar Talbi; (yellow card) 74' Fernando Boldrin	Stadium: Büyükşehir Belediye Stadyumu; Attendance: 0 Referee: Fırat Aydınus; Assistant referees: Aleks Taşcıoğlu, Erdem Bayık; Fourth official: Emre Malok; Goal-line assistants: Bahattin Şimşek, Çağdaş Altay

9 July 2020 31	Gaziantep	3 - 1	Konyaspor	Gaziantep
21.00	Oğuz Ceylan (yellow card) 50'; Furkan Soyalp (yellow card) 71' (goal) 89'; Alexandru Maxim 87' (pen.); Bartłomiej Pawłowski 90+9'; Júnior Morais (yellow card) MS'	Report	13' (yellow card) 90+6' Deni Milošević; (yellow card) 45' Farouk Miya; (yellow card) 82' Ertuğrul Taşkıran; (yellow card) 90+1' Uğur Demirok; (yellow card) MS' Alper Uludağ	Stadium: New Gaziantep Stadium; Attendance: 0 Referee: Hüseyin Göçek; Assistant referees: Serkan Ok, Candaş Elbil; Fourth official: Turgut Doman; Goal-line assistants: Koray Gençerler, Emre Kargın

13 July 2020 32	Konyaspor	4 - 3	İstanbul Başakşehir	Konya
21.00	Farouk Miya (yellow card) 3' (goal) 20', 45+1'; Uğur Demirok (yellow card) 10'; Ömer Ali Şahiner 28'; Deni Milošević (yellow card) 35'; Nejc Skubic 85'	Report	3' (pen.) (yellow card) 31' Edin Višća; (yellow card) 32' Danijel Aleksić; (yellow card) 49' Alexandru Epureanu; 70' Demba Ba; 77' Eljero Elia	Stadium: Büyükşehir Belediye Stadyumu; Attendance: 0 Referee: Cüneyt Çakır; Assistant referees: Bahattin Duran, Tarık Ongun; Fourth official: Caner Ak; Goal-line assistants: Ali Palabıyık, Hakan Ceylan

19 July 2020 33	Trabzonspor	3 - 4	Konyaspor	Trabzon
21.00		Report		Stadium: Şenol Güneş Stadium; Attendance: 0 Referee: Atilla Karaoğlan; Assistant referees: İsmail Şencan, Mehmet Cem Hanoğlu; Fourth official: Alper Çetin

July 2020 34	Konyaspor	2 - 3	Alanyaspor	Konya
		Report		Stadium: Büyükşehir Belediye Stadyumu
