= 2023–24 AEK Athens F.C. season =

AEK Athens
2023–24 season
- Chairman: Evangelos Aslanidis
- Manager: Matías Almeyda
- Stadium: Agia Sophia Stadium
- Super League: 2nd (Play-offs); 2nd (Regular season)
- Greek Cup: Round of 16
- UEFA Champions League: Play-off round
- UEFA Europa League: Group stage
- Top goalscorer: League: Ezequiel Ponce (15); All: Ezequiel Ponce (16)
- Highest home attendance: 31,100 (vs Olympiacos) (31 March 2024) (vs Panathinaikos) (24 April 2024) (vs Lamia) (19 May 2024)
- Lowest home attendance: 22,080 (vs Panserraikos) (26 August 2023)
- Average home league attendance: 27,434
- Biggest win: Atromitos 0–5 AEK Athens
- Biggest defeat: Marseille 3–1 AEK Athens; Ajax 3–1 AEK Athens; AEK Athens 0–2 Marseille; OFI 2–0 AEK Athens; Olympiacos 2–0 AEK Athens
Home colours	Away colours	Third colours

The 2023–24 season was the 100th season in the existence of AEK Athens F.C. and the 63rd competitive season and ninth consecutive in the top flight of Greek football. They competed in the Super League, the Greek Cup, the Champions League and the Europa League. The season began on 15 August 2023 and finished on 19 May 2024.

== Kits ==
Supplier: Nike
Sponsor(s): Pame stoixima
Features: Car.gr, LG Corp

Home	Away	Third	Anniversary

== Overview ==
The summer of 2023 found AEK starting as the dominant club in Greece, as they had won the domestic double in their previous season. Matías Almeyda decided to maintain the roster that won the double, with the only players to depart being Georgios Tzavellas and Alexander Fransson. On the other hand, Stavros Pilios, Rodolfo Pizarro and Alexander Callens were acquired, Ezequiel Ponce returned after 4 years, while the transfer of Orbelín Pineda became permanent with a record fee of €6.5 million.

AEK began their competitive obligations in the third qualifying round of the UEFA Champions League, where they were drawn against Dinamo Zagreb. On 7 August, one day before the first leg at Nea Filadelfeia, 100 ultras of the Croatian team, joined by Greek ultras, crossed the country without being intercepted by the authorities and attacked the supporters of AEK outside the stadium. During the attack, a 29-year-old fan of AEK, Michalis Katsouris, was fatally stabbed multiple times. The murder of Katsouris would have a lasting impact on the club throughout the season, both on and off the pitch. In the aftermath of these events, UEFA decided not to impose sanctions on the Croatian club, but to postpone the match, which was moved as the second leg of the tie. Thus, on 15 August, just days after the incident, AEK played their first match at Stadion Maksimir. In the stadium there were only supporters of Dinamo, since any movement of fans was strictly prohibited, while the footballers competed with black armbands. After falling 1–0 behind in the first half, AEK later equalized with Steven Zuber. In the final minutes they completed the comeback with a goal by Galanopoulos, who, after scoring, raised his black armband towards the Croatian ultras. In the rematch, despite losing 0–2 in the second half, AEK responded in the final minutes, scoring twice to equalize the match and snatch qualification, which was dedicated to Michalis Katsouris. Since UEFA did not accept any changes to their schedule, AEK traveled to Bosuilstadion three days later to face Royal Antwerp for the play-off round. Despite creating several chances, they were defeated by 1–0, by an early goal from the Belgian champions. In the second leg, at Agia Sophia Stadium, AEK dominated possession for much of the match, but Antwerp withstood the pressure and got away with a 1–2 win, which sent the yellow-blacks to the group stage of the UEFA Europa League. There, they were drawn with Ajax, Marseille and Brighton & Hove Albion. Despite the difficult draw, AEK performed well, winning their first match at Falmer Stadium, but didn't get the respective results and lost the qualification to Ajax in the final matchday.

AEK entered the Cup at the round of 16 facing Aris. In the first leg in Athens that took place at an empty stadium due to punishment, Almeyda made an extensive rotation, which resulted in a goalless draw. In the rematch of Thessaloniki, AEK took the lead in the second half, but Aris quickly equalized and the match went to a penalty shoot-out. There, AEK were eliminated with the score of 4–2.

The Championship began with AEK as the main contender for the title. Nevertheless, they often dropped points in matches in which they were expected to win, keeping them away from the top of the table despite remaining close to the leaders. They remained unbeaten against all of their title rivals in the regular season, recording a win and a draw against each of them. Eventually they entered the play-offs in the second place with one point behind PAOK. In the play-offs they moved to the top of the table, completing 13 consecutive derbies without a defeat. However, their streak was broken in a 2–1 defeat at Leoforos Alexandras Stadium, where AEK took the lead but conceded two "cheap" goals to Panathinaikos and fell to the second place. Furthermore, in the following matchday against PAOK at home in a similar situation, AEK had a 2–0 lead, but were equalized in the final minutes. The two victories against Aris and a 3–0 win against Panathinaikos that followed brought them very close to the title. Nevertheless, two consecutive defeats to PAOK and Olympiacos gave the advantage to the club of Thessaloniki. On the final matchday AEK were playing against Lamia at home, requiring that PAOK not to win in order to win their second Championship in a row. Eventually, AEK won by 3–0, while PAOK won by 1―0 and were denied the opportunity to win the Championship in their 100-year anniversary.

== Management team ==
Position	Staff
Manager	(Argentina) Matías Almeyda
Assistant manager	(Argentina) Daniel Vega
Goalkeeping coach	(Argentina) Carlos Roa
Fitness coach	(Argentina) Guido Bonini
Fitness coach	(Greece) Kostas Parousis
Fitness coach	(Greece) Sotiris Mavros
Technical director	(Poland) Radosław Kucharski
Executive director	(Greece) Panagiotis Kone
Sporting director	(Portugal) Bruno Alves
Scout	(Greece) Stamoulis Petrou
Scout	(Greece) Dimitrios Xouris
Scout	(Greece) Fanouris Goundoulakis
Head of Medical	(Greece) Lakis Nikolaou

- Source: aekfc.gr

== Players ==
=== Squad information ===
NOTE: The players are the ones that have been announced by the AEK Athens' press release. No edits should be made unless a player's arrival or exit is announced. Updated 31 January 2024, 18:46 UTC+2.

No.	Player	Nat.	Position(s)	Date of birth (Age)	Signed	Previous club	Transfer fee	Contract until
Goalkeepers
1	Cican Stanković	(Austria)	GK	4 November 1992 (aged 31)	2021	(Austria) Red Bull Salzburg	€1,150,000	2025
30	Georgios Athanasiadis (Vice-captain 4)	(Greece)	GK	7 April 1993 (aged 31)	2019	(Greece) Asteras Tripolis	Free	2025
Defenders
2	Harold Moukoudi	(Cameroon) (France)	CB	27 November 1997 (aged 26)	2022	(France) Saint-Étienne	Free	2026
12	Lazaros Rota	(Greece) (Albania)	RB / RM	23 August 1997 (aged 26)	2021	(Netherlands) Fortuna Sittard	Free	2026
17	Stavros Pilios	(Greece) (Albania)	LB / LM	10 December 2000 (aged 23)	2023	(Greece) PAS Giannina	Free	2027
18	Alexander Callens	(Peru) (Spain)	CB / LB	4 May 1992 (aged 32)	2023	(Spain) Girona	Free	2024
21	Domagoj Vida	(Croatia)	CB / RB	29 April 1989 (aged 35)	2022	(Turkey) Beşiktaş	Free	2026
24	Gerasimos Mitoglou	(Greece)	CB	20 October 1999 (aged 24)	2021	(Greece) Volos	€300,000	2026
26	Ehsan Hajsafi	(Iran)	LB / LM / LW / AM / CM / DM	25 February 1990 (aged 34)	2021	(Iran) Sepahan	Free	2025
29	Djibril Sidibé	(France) (Mali)	RB / LB / RM / CB	29 July 1992 (aged 31)	2022	(France) Monaco	Free	2024
Midfielders
4	Damian Szymański (Vice-captain)	(Poland)	DM / CM / AM	16 June 1995 (aged 29)	2020	(Russia) Akhmat Grozny	€1,300,000	2027
6	Jens Jønsson	(Denmark)	DM / CM / CB	10 January 1993 (aged 31)	2022	(Spain) Cádiz	Free	2026
8	Mijat Gaćinović	(Serbia) (Bosnia and Herzegovina)	AM / CM / LM / LW / RM / RW	8 February 1995 (aged 29)	2022	(Germany) Hoffenheim	€1,000,000	2026
13	Orbelín Pineda	(Mexico)	AM / CM / LM / LW / RM / RW / SS / DM / RB	24 March 1996 (aged 28)	2023	(Spain) Celta de Vigo	€6,500,000	2027
19	Niclas Eliasson	(Sweden) (Brazil)	RM / LM / RW / LW	7 December 1995 (aged 28)	2022	(France) Nîmes	€2,000,000	2027
20	Petros Mantalos	(Greece)	AM / LM / CM / LW / SS / RM / RW	31 August 1991 (aged 32)	2014	(Greece) Xanthi	€500,000	2026
22	Paolo Fernandes	(Spain)	AM / RM / LM / RW / LW	19 August 1998 (aged 25)	2023	(Greece) Volos	€700,000	2027
23	Robert Ljubičić	(Croatia) (Austria)	CM / RM / LM / AM / DM / LB	14 July 1999 (aged 24)	2024	(Croatia) Dinamo Zagreb	€4,000,000	2029
25	Konstantinos Galanopoulos (Vice-captain 2)	(Greece)	CM / DM	28 December 1997 (aged 26)	2015	(Greece) AEK Athens U20	—	2025
70	Rodolfo Pizarro	(Mexico)	AM / LW / RW / CM / LM / RM	15 February 1994 (aged 30)	2023	(United States) Inter Miami	Free	2025
Forwards
5	Nordin Amrabat	(Morocco) (Netherlands)	RW / LW / RM / LM / AM / SS / ST	31 March 1987 (aged 37)	2021	(Saudi Arabia) Al Nassr	Free	2024
7	Levi García	(Trinidad and Tobago)	ST / RW / RM / SS / LW / LM	20 November 1997 (aged 26)	2020	(Israel) Beitar Jerusalem	€2,600,000	2028
9	Tom van Weert	(Netherlands)	ST / SS	7 June 1990 (aged 34)	2022	(Greece) Volos	€500,000	2024
10	Steven Zuber (Vice-captain 3)	(Switzerland)	LW / LM / SS / ST / AM / RW / RM	17 August 1991 (aged 32)	2022	(Germany) Eintracht Frankfurt	€1,600,000	2025
11	Sergio Araujo (Captain)	(Argentina)	ST / SS / LW / RW	28 January 1992 (aged 32)	2021	(Spain) Las Palmas	€1,462,500	2024
14	Ezequiel Ponce	(Argentina) (Spain)	ST / SS / LW / RW	29 March 1997 (aged 27)	2023	(Spain) Elche	€3,500,000	2027
53	Theodosis Macheras	(Greece)	LW / RW / RM / LM	9 May 2000 (aged 24)	2020	(Greece) AEK Athens U19	—	2026
90	Zini	(Angola)	ST / SS / LW / LM / RW / RM	3 July 2002 (aged 21)	2023	(Angola) 1º de Agosto	€350,000	2028
Left during Winter Transfer Window
3	Milad Mohammadi	(Iran)	LB / LM / LW	29 September 1993 (aged 30)	2021	(Belgium) Gent	Free	2025
From AEK Athens B
39	Panagiotis Ginis	(Greece)	GK	23 January 1999 (aged 25)	2018	(Greece) AEK Athens U19	—	2024
99	Georgios Theocharis	(Greece)	GK	30 June 2002 (aged 22)	2020	(Greece) AEK Athens U19	—	2024
37	Vedad Radonja	(Bosnia and Herzegovina)	RB / LB / RM / DM	6 September 2001 (aged 22)	2020	(Croatia) Dinamo Zagreb U19	Free	2025
55	Konstantinos Chrysopoulos	(Greece)	CB	21 May 2003 (aged 21)	2023	(Greece) Aris	€800,000	2028
63	Rockson Yeboah	(Ghana)	CB	2 August 2004 (aged 19)	2023	(Ghana) Tehiman United	Free	2024
44	Anel Šabanadžović	(Bosnia and Herzegovina) (United States)	CM / DM	24 May 1999 (aged 25)	2019	(Bosnia and Herzegovina) Željezničar	€450,000	2023
46	Konstantinos Roukounakis	(Greece)	DM / CM	17 July 2001 (aged 22)	2021	(Greece) AEK Athens U19	—	2026
96	Jallow Lamarana	(The Gambia)	CM / DM	21 March 2002 (aged 22)	2023	(The Gambia) Elite United	Free	2024
97	Judah García	(Trinidad and Tobago)	AM / LM / LW / CM	24 October 2000 (aged 23)	2021	(India) NEROCA	Free	2024
72	Apostolos Christopoulos	(Greece)	ST / SS	29 January 2003 (aged 21)	2021	(Greece) AEK Athens U19	—	2024
82	Spyros Skondras	(Greece)	LW / LM	6 April 2001 (aged 23)	2022	(Greece) Panetolikos	Free	2025

== Transfers ==
=== In ===
==== Summer ====
No.	Pos.	Player	From	Fee	Date	Contract Until	Source
13	MF	(Mexico) Orbelín Pineda	(Spain) Celta de Vigo	€6,500,000	1 July 2023	30 June 2027	
14	FW	(Argentina) Ezequiel Ponce	(Spain) Elche	€3,500,000	5 August 2023	30 June 2027	
17	DF	(Greece) Stavros Pilios	(Greece) PAS Giannina	Free transfer	1 July 2023	30 June 2027	
55	DF	(Greece) Konstantinos Chrysopoulos	(Greece) Aris	€800,000^{[a]}	3 July 2023	30 June 2028	
70	MF	(Mexico) Rodolfo Pizarro	(United States) Inter Miami	Free transfer	17 July 2023	30 June 2025	
90	FW	(Angola) Zini	(Greece) AEK Athens Β	Promotion	1 July 2023	30 June 2028	
—	DF	(Greece) Stratos Svarnas	(Poland) Raków Częstochowa	Loan return	1 July 2023	30 June 2025	
—	DF	(France) Clément Michelin	(France) Bordeaux	Loan return	1 July 2023	30 June 2025	
—	DF	(Ukraine) Oleh Danchenko	(Ukraine) Zorya Luhansk	Loan return	1 July 2023	30 June 2024	

==== Winter ====
No.	Pos.	Player	From	Fee	Date	Contract Until	Source
23	MF	(Croatia) Robert Ljubičić	(Croatia) Dinamo Zagreb	€4,000,000	31 January 2024	30 June 2029	
53	FW	(Greece) Theodosis Macheras	(Greece) Volos	Loan termination	30 November 2023	30 June 2026	

=== Out ===
==== Summer ====
No.	Pos.	Player	To	Fee	Date	Source
13	MF	(Mexico) Orbelín Pineda	(Spain) Celta de Vigo	Loan return	30 June 2023	
14	MF	(Sweden) Alexander Fransson	(Cyprus) Omonia	End of contract	19 August 2023	
31	DF	(Greece) Georgios Tzavellas	(Turkey) Pendikspor	End of contract	9 July 2023	
55	DF	(Greece) Konstantinos Chrysopoulos	(Greece) AEK Athens Β		3 July 2023	
–	DF	(Greece) Stratos Svarnas	(Poland) Raków Częstochowa	€800,000	1 July 2023	
–	DF	(France) Clément Michelin	(France) Bordeaux	€1,000,000	1 July 2023	

==== Winter ====
No.	Pos.	Player	To	Fee	Date	Source
3	DF	(Iran) Milad Mohammadi	(Turkey) Adana Demirspor	Free transfer	26 January 2024	

=== Loan in ===
==== Summer ====
No.	Pos.	Player	From	Fee	Date	Until	Option to buy	Source
18	DF	(Peru) Alexander Callens	(Spain) Girona	Free	8 September 2023	30 June 2024	✓	

=== Loan out ===
==== Summer ====
No.	Pos.	Player	To	Fee	Date	Until	Option to buy	Source
53	FW	(Greece) Theodosis Macheras	(Greece) Volos	Free	21 August 2023	30 June 2024	✗	
—	DF	(Ukraine) Oleh Danchenko	(Ukraine) Zorya Luhansk	Free	10 July 2023	30 June 2024	✗	

Notes

a. Aris keeps the 50% of the player's rights.

=== Contract renewals ===
No.	Pos.	Player	Date	Former Exp. Date	New Exp. Date	Source
5	FW	(Morocco) Nordin Amrabat	30 June 2023	30 June 2023	30 June 2024	
7	FW	(Trinidad and Tobago) Levi García	2 August 2023	30 June 2025	30 June 2028	
20	MF	(Greece) Petros Mantalos	2 November 2023	30 June 2024	30 June 2026	
21	DF	(Croatia) Domagoj Vida	11 November 2023	30 June 2024	30 June 2026	
25	MF	(Greece) Konstantinos Galanopoulos	26 June 2023	30 June 2024	30 June 2025	

=== Overall transfer activity ===
==== Expenditure ====
Summer: ▼€10,800,000

Winter: ▼€4,000,000

Total: ▼€14,800,000

==== Income ====
Summer: ▲€1,800,000

Winter: ▲€0

Total: ▲€1,800,000

==== Net Totals ====
Summer: ▼€9,000,000

Winter: ▼€4,000,000

Total: ▼€13,000,000

== Pre-season and friendlies ==
4 July 2023 Friendly	AEK Athens	0–1	Lokomotiva Zagreb	Burgh-Haamstede
14:00 EEST (UTC+3)	Pilios (yellow card) 75'	Report	Mersinaj 29'	Stadium: Sportpark Van Zuijen; Attendance: Behind closed doors Referee: Jazzy Hindriks (Netherlands)
Note: 75-minute match (45+30 minutes).

8 July 2023 Friendly	Royal Antwerp	0–3	AEK Athens	Antwerp
14:30 EEST (UTC+3)	Yusuf (yellow card) 36'	Report	Moukoudi (yellow card) 2'; Szymański (yellow card) 47'; Van Weert 56'; Zini 61'; Kosidis 87'; Macheras (penalty missed) 114'	Stadium: Bosuilstadion; Referee: Arthur Denil (Belgium)
Note: 120-minute match (30-minute quarters).

13 July 2023 Friendly	AEK Athens	5–0	Shakhtar Donetsk	Schiedam
18:00 EEST (UTC+3)	García 12', 40', 65'; Amrabat (yellow card) 15' (yellow-red card) 15'; Zini 83', 86'	Report	Udod (yellow card) 23' (yellow-red card) 28'; Castillo (yellow card) 53'	Stadium: Sportpark Harga; Referee: Martin van den Kerkhof (Netherlands)

13 July 2023 Friendly	AEK Athens	2–0	Shakhtar Donetsk B	Schiedam
20:00 EEST (UTC+3)	Galanopoulos (red card) 8'; Macheras 34'; Radonja 59', (yellow card) 68'	Report	Losenko (yellow card) 21'	Stadium: Sportpark Harga
Note: 70-minute match.

23 July 2023 Friendly	Volos	0–3	AEK Athens	Volos
21:00 EEST (UTC+3)		Report	García 16', 22'; Macheras 61'	Stadium: Panthessaliko Stadium; Referee: Stelios Kalantzis (Thessaly)

30 July 2023 Friendly	Trabzonspor	1–3	AEK Athens	Trabzon
20:00 EEST (UTC+3)	Gómez 54'; Bakasetas (penalty missed) 82'	Report	García 31', (penalty missed) 69'; Eliasson 41'; Moukoudi (yellow card) 55'; Van Weert 75'	Stadium: Akyazi Stadium; Attendance: 5,000; Referee: Yasin Kol (Turkey)

20 March 2024 Friendly	Apollon Limassol	0–1	AEK Athens	Kolossi
19:00 EEST (UTC+3)		Report	Van Weert 9'	Stadium: Alphamega Stadium; Referee: Kyriakos Athanasiou (Cyprus)
Note: Friendly match for the 70th anniversary of Apollon Limassol.

== Competitions ==
=== Overall record ===
Competition	First match	Last match	Starting round	Final position	Record							
Competition	First match	Last match	Starting round	Final position	Pld	W	D	L	GF	GA	GD	Win %
Super League	26 August 2023	3 March 2024	Matchday 1	2nd	26	17	8	1	60	25	+35	65.38
Super League Play-offs	10 March 2024	19 May 2024	Matchday 1	2nd	10	6	1	3	20	8	+12	60.00
Greek Cup	10 January 2024	17 January 2024	Round of 16	Round of 16	2	0	2	0	1	1	+0	0.00
UEFA Champions League	15 August 2023	30 August 2023	Third qualifying round	Play-off round	4	1	1	2	5	6	−1	25.00
UEFA Europa League	21 September 2023	14 December 2023	Group stage	Group stage	6	1	1	4	6	12	−6	16.67
Total					48	25	13	10	92	52	+40	52.08

Last updated: 3 March 2024
Source: Competitions

=== Super League Greece ===
==== Regular season ====
===== League table =====
Pos	Team	Pld	W	D	L	GF	GA	GD	Pts	Qualification or relegation
1	PAOK	26	19	3	4	66	21	+45	60	Qualification for the Play-off round
2	AEK Athens	26	17	8	1	60	25	+35	59	Qualification for the Play-off round
3	Olympiacos	26	18	3	5	58	24	+34	57	Qualification for the Play-off round
4	Panathinaikos	26	17	5	4	62	21	+41	56	Qualification for the Play-off round
5	Aris	26	12	6	8	39	29	+10	42	Qualification for the Play-off round

Source: Super League Greece
Rules for classification: 1) Points; 2) Head-to-head points; 3) Head-to-head goal difference; 4) Goal difference; 5) Goals scored; 6) Play-offs (neutral ground).
(Note: Criterion 6 is only used if needed to decide champion, teams for relegation or teams for UEFA competitions).

===== Results summary =====
Overall								Home						Away					
Pld	W	D	L	GF	GA	GD	Pts	W	D	L	GF	GA	GD	W	D	L	GF	GA	GD
26	17	8	1	60	25	+35	59	10	3	0	32	11	+21	7	5	1	28	14	+14

Last updated: 2024-03-03.
Source: Super League Greece

===== Results by Matchday =====
Round	1	2	3	4	5	6	7	8	9	10	11	12	13	14	15	16	17	18	19	20	21	22	23	24	25	26
Ground	H	H	A	H	A	H	A	A	H	A	H	A	H	A	A	H	A	H	A	H	H	A	H	A	H	A
Result	W	D	W	D	W	W	L	W	W	D	W	W	W	D	D	W	W	D	W	W	W	D	W	W	W	D
Position	7	8	6	6	4	4	4	3	3	3	3	3	2	2	4	3	2	3	3	2	2	3	1	1	1	2

Updated to match(es) played on 3 March 2024. Source: slgr.gr
A = Away; H = Home; W = Win; D = Draw; L = Loss; P = Postponed

===== Matches =====
8 October 2023 1	AEK Athens	3–0	Panetolikos	Nea Filadelfeia
19:30 EEST (UTC+3)	Vida 34'; Rota 36'; Moukoudi 89'	Report	Pérez (yellow card) 65'; Mladen (yellow card) 84'	Stadium: Agia Sophia Stadium; Attendance: 25,231; Referee: Efstathios Gortsilas (Macedonia); Man of the Match: Domagoj Vida
Note: The match was originally scheduled for 19 August, but after the postponment of the home match against Dinamo Zagreb for the UEFA Champins League qualifiers to that date, the Super League was forced to postpone the match.

26 August 2023 2	AEK Athens	1–1	Panserraikos	Nea Filadelfeia
21:30 EEST (UTC+3)	Gaćinović (yellow card) 45+2', (goal) 78'; Van Weert (penalty missed) 63'	Report	Aleksić 1'; Gotzamanidis (yellow card) 37'; Ouédraogo (yellow card) 64'; Woolery (yellow card) 67'; Chovan (yellow card) 72'; Petavrakis (yellow card) 75'; Thymianis (yellow card) 87'	Stadium: Agia Sophia Stadium; Attendance: 22,080; Referee: Efstathios Gortsilas (Macedonia); Man of the Match: Adrián Chovan

3 September 2023 3	Volos	2–3	AEK Athens	Volos
21:30 EEST (UTC+3)	Deletić 8', 72'; Kitsos (yellow card) 31'; Aslanidis (yellow card) 36'; Sielis (yellow card) 86'	Report	Mantalos (red card) 24'; Jønsson 32', (yellow card) 90'; Zuber 37'; Amrabat 90+3' (pen.)	Stadium: Panthessaliko Stadium; Attendance: 3,471; Referee: Evangelos Manouchos (Argolida); Man of the Match: Jens Jønsson

17 September 2023 4	AEK Athens	1–1	Olympiacos	Nea Filadelfeia
21:30 EEST (UTC+3)	Ponce 22'; Szymański (yellow card) 25'; Rota (yellow card) 49'	Report	Fortounis (yellow card) 15'; El Kaabi 38'; Biel (yellow card) 62'; Rodinei (yellow card) 79'; Paschalakis (yellow card) 83'	Stadium: Agia Sophia Stadium; Attendance: 29,421; Referee: Artur Soares Dias (Portugal); Man of the Match: Ezequiel Ponce

25 September 2023 5	Panathinaikos	1–2	AEK Athens	Ampelokipoi
21:00 EEST (UTC+3)	Đuričić 10'; Bernard (yellow card) 33'; Juankar (yellow card) 44'; Palacios (yellow card) 89'	Report	Mitoglou (yellow card) 21'; Gaćinović (yellow card) 25'; Zuber 36'; Galanopoulos (yellow card) 54'; Pineda 68'; Araujo (yellow card) 89'	Stadium: Leoforos Alexandras Stadium; Attendance: 16,002; Referee: Simone Sozza (Italy); Man of the Match: Steven Zuber

28 September 2023 6	AEK Athens	2–1	Atromitos	Nea Filadelfeia
21:00 EEST (UTC+3)	Amrabat 31' (pen.); Hajsafi (yellow card) 75'; Callens (yellow card) 84'; Sidibé (red card) 88'; Gaćinović 90+5' (pen.)	Report	De Bock (yellow card) 28'; Tsakmakis (yellow card) 33'; Jubitana (yellow card) 45'; Angielski 89' (pen.); Erlingmark (yellow card) 90+2'	Stadium: Agia Sophia Stadium; Attendance: 25,045; Referee: Ioannis Papadopoulos (Macedonia); Man of the Match: Petros Mantalos

2 October 2023 7	OFI	2–0	AEK Athens	Heraklion
20:00 EEST (UTC+3)	Phellype 5'; Bakić (yellow card) 43'; Baumann (yellow card) 78'; Dicko 83'; Abanda (yellow card) 90+6'; Lampropoulos (yellow card) 90+6'	Report	Galanopoulos (yellow card) 63'; Gaćinović (yellow card) 82'; Szymański (yellow card) 90+6'	Stadium: Theodoros Vardinogiannis Stadium; Attendance: 5,094; Referee: Aristotelis Diamantopoulos (Arcadia); Man of the Match: Luiz Phellype

22 October 2023 8	Asteras Tripolis	0–3	AEK Athens	Tripoli
16:00 EEST (UTC+3)	Miritello (yellow card) 6'; Grozdanić (yellow card) 11'; Munafo (yellow card) 16'; Castaño (yellow card) 45' (yellow-red card) 52'; Alagbe (yellow card) 80'	Report	Mantalos (yellow card) 45'; Rota (yellow card) 45+1'; Eliasson 45+3', (yellow card) 90'; Callens (yellow card) 48'; Jønsson (yellow card) 67'; Mohammadi 77'; Zuber 86'	Stadium: Theodoros Kolokotronis Stadium; Attendance: 5,188; Referee: Anastasios Sidiropoulos (Dodecanese); Man of the Match: Niclas Eliasson

30 October 2023 9	AEK Athens	2–0	PAOK	Nea Filadelfeia
19:30 EET (UTC+2)	Pineda 17', (yellow card) 90+4'; Szymański (yellow card) 32'; Eliasson 54'; Galanopoulos (yellow card) 87'; Gaćinović (yellow card) 90+4'	Report	Živković (yellow card) 24'; Baba Rahman (yellow card) 29'; Sastre (yellow card) 80'; Taison (yellow card) 87'; Thomas (yellow card) 88'	Stadium: Agia Sophia Stadium; Attendance: 30,452; Referee: Felix Brych (Germany); Man of the Match: Damian Szymański

4 November 2023 10	A.E. Kifisia	1–1	AEK Athens	Kaisariani
20:00 EET (UTC+2)	Parras (yellow card) 45+1'; Landre (yellow card) 50'; Vafeas 85'	Report	Athanasiadis (yellow card) 45'; Schneiderlin 58' (o.g.); Mohammadi (yellow card) 76'	Stadium: Michalis Kritikopoulos Stadium; Attendance: 924; Referee: Petros Tsagarakis (Chania); Man of the Match: Alexandros Anagnostopoulos

12 November 2023 11	AEK Athens	3–0	Lamia	Nea Filadelfeia
19:30 EET (UTC+2)	García 10'; Araujo 36', (yellow card) 52'; Gaćinović (yellow card) 61'; Szymański (yellow card) 90+1'; Mantalos 90+4' (pen.)	Report	Martínez (yellow card) 18'; Longo (yellow card) 84'; Papadopoulos (yellow card) 90+3'	Stadium: Agia Sophia Stadium; Attendance: 24,502; Referee: Konstantinos Tsetsilas (Grevena); Man of the Match: Sergio Araujo

26 November 2023 12	PAS Giannina	0–1	AEK Athens	Ioannina
17:00 EET (UTC+2)	Rienstra (yellow card) 86'; Erramuspe (yellow card) 90+6'	Report	Zuber 7'; Callens (yellow card) 81'	Stadium: Zosimades Stadium; Attendance: 3,269; Referee: Aristotelis Diamantopoulos (Arcadia); Man of the Match: Steven Zuber

4 December 2023 13	AEK Athens	1–0	Aris	Nea Filadelfeia
21:00 EET (UTC+2)	Vida (yellow card) 43', (goal) 59'	Report	Darida (yellow card) 24'	Stadium: Agia Sophia Stadium; Attendance: 26,810; Referee: Mohammed Al-Hakim (Sweden); Man of the Match: Domagoj Vida

18 December 2023 14	Panetolikos	2–2	AEK Athens	Agrinio
17:00 EET (UTC+2)	João Pedro 37' (pen.); F. Duarte (yellow card) 39'; B. Duarte (yellow card) 52'; Baldassarra 65'; Oikonomou (yellow card) 70'; Torrejón (yellow card) 89'	Report	García 2'; Eliasson 14'; Mantalos (yellow card) 90+2'	Stadium: Panetolikos Stadium; Attendance: Behind closed doors Referee: Evangelos Manouchos (Argolida); Man of the Match: Franco Baldassarra

21 December 2023 15	Panserraikos	2–2	AEK Athens	Serres
17:00 EET (UTC+2)	Moreira (yellow card) 10'; Dankerlui (yellow card) 16'; Thymianis (yellow card) 33', (goal) 39', 90+4'; Sofianos (yellow card) 53'; Ouédraogo (yellow card) 69'	Report	Rota 16'; García 45'; Galanopoulos (yellow card) 45+2'; Moukoudi (yellow card) 67'; Zuber (yellow card) 70'; Mantalos (yellow card) 72'	Stadium: Serres Municipal Stadium; Attendance: Behind closed doors Referee: Anastasios Sidiropoulos (Dodecanese); Man of the Match: Konstantinos Thymianis

3 January 2024 16	AEK Athens	3–0	Volos	Nea Filadelfeia
19:00 EET (UTC+2)	García 32', 51' (pen.); Szymański (yellow card) 34'; Rota (yellow card) 62'; Amrabat 73'	Report	Alho (yellow card) 15'; Comba (yellow card) 41'; Aslanidis (yellow card) 45+2'; Mygas (yellow card) 66'; Deletić (yellow card) 81'	Stadium: Agia Sophia Stadium; Attendance: Behind closed doors Referee: Konstantinos Perakis (Athens); Man of the Match: Levi García

7 January 2024 17	Olympiacos	1–2	AEK Athens	Piraeus
21:00 EET (UTC+2)	Masouras 44'; Retsos (yellow card) 55'; Podence (yellow card) 57'; Fortounis (yellow card) 59'	Report	García 32'; Zuber 38', (yellow card) 70'; Gaćinović (yellow card) 78'; Jønsson (yellow card) 89'	Stadium: Georgios Karaiskakis Stadium; Attendance: Behind closed doors Referee: Boris Marhefka (Slovakia); Man of the Match: Levi García

14 January 2024 18	AEK Athens	2–2	Panathinaikos	Nea Filadelfeia
20:30 EET (UTC+2)	García 24', 90+6' (pen.); Gaćinović (yellow card) 30'; Callens (yellow card) 52'; Szymański (yellow card) 65'	Report	Mancini (yellow card) 17'; Jedvaj 31'; Arão 66'; Ioannidis (yellow card) 85'	Stadium: Agia Sophia Stadium; Attendance: Behind closed doors Referee: Mohammed Al-Hakim (Sweden); Man of the Match: Levi García

21 January 2024 19	Atromitos	0–5	AEK Athens	Peristeri
17:30 EET (UTC+2)		Report	Ponce 2', 15', 58'; Callens 35'; Vida (yellow card) 42'; Jønsson 66'; Pizarro (yellow card) 81'	Stadium: Peristeri Stadium; Attendance: Behind closed doors Referee: Angelos Evangelou (Athens); Man of the Match: Ezequiel Ponce

28 January 2024 20	AEK Athens	3–0	OFI	Nea Filadelfeia
16:00 EET (UTC+2)	Ponce 28', 67'; Pilios (yellow card) 78'; Mantalos (yellow card) 82'; Van Weert 90+6'	Report	Riera (yellow card) 46'	Stadium: Agia Sophia Stadium; Attendance: Behind closed doors Referee: Anastasios Papapetrou (Athens); Man of the Match: Ezequiel Ponce

4 February 2024 21	AEK Athens	4–2	Asteras Tripolis	Nea Filadelfeia
17:30 EET (UTC+2)	Ponce 25', 27'; Zukanović 43' (o.g.); García 76'	Report	Zukanović (yellow card) 12'; Goss (yellow card) 32'; Bartolo (yellow card) 41', (goal) 45+3' (pen.); Miritello 90'	Stadium: Agia Sophia Stadium; Attendance: Behind closed doors Referee: Alexandros Katsikogiannis (Epirus); Man of the Match: Ezequiel Ponce

11 February 2024 22	PAOK	1–1	AEK Athens	Thessaloniki
20:00 EET (UTC+2)	Samatta (yellow card) 33'; Kędziora 89'; Thomas (yellow card) 90+1'	Report	Rota (yellow card) 25'; Vida (yellow card) 35'; Eliasson 47'; Callens (yellow card) 88'	Stadium: Toumba Stadium; Attendance: Behind closed doors Referee: Aliyar Aghayev (Azerbaijan); Man of the Match: Orbelín Pineda

18 February 2024 23	AEK Athens	3–0	A.E. Kifisia	Nea Filadelfeia
19:00 EET (UTC+2)	García (penalty missed) 7', 19', 25'; Hajsafi (yellow card) 34'; Callens (yellow card) 67'; Ljubičić 90'	Report	Spinos (red card) 4'; Gobeljić (yellow card) 47'; Soloa (yellow card) 54'	Stadium: Agia Sophia Stadium; Attendance: 26,325; Referee: Efstathios Gortsilas (Macedonia); Man of the Match: Levi García

24 February 2024 24	Lamia	1–3	AEK Athens	Lamia
19:00 EET (UTC+2)	Tošić (yellow card) 43'; Sidcley 64'; Santana (yellow card) 83'	Report	Vida 17'; Eliasson 41'; Zuber 63'; Pizarro (yellow card) 87'	Stadium: Lamia Municipal Stadium; Attendance: 2,667; Referee: Ioannis Papadopoulos (Macedonia); Man of the Match: Nordin Amrabat

28 February 2024 25	AEK Athens	4–2	PAS Giannina	Nea Filadelfeia
00:00 EET (UTC+2)	Szymański 15'; Ponce 69', 79'; Ljubičić 74'	Report	Sobociński 35'; Tzimas (yellow card) 39', (goal) 44'; Demir (yellow card) 50'; Soulis (yellow card) 65'; Soria (yellow card) 90'; Begala (yellow card) 90+1'	Stadium: Agia Sophia Stadium; Attendance: 22,523; Referee: Dimitris Maloutas (Imathia); Man of the Match: Ezequiel Ponce

3 March 2024 26	Aris	3–3	AEK Athens	Thessaloniki
19:30 EET (UTC+2)	Montoya (yellow card) 13'; Jules (yellow card) 15'; Fetfatzidis 43'; Saverio 47'; Vélez (yellow card) 70'; Morón 90+7' (pen.)	Report	Amrabat 15' (pen.); Ljubičić (yellow card) 26'; Vida 55'; Ponce 67'; Zuber (yellow card) 72'; Szymański (yellow card) 90+1'	Stadium: Kleanthis Vikelidis Stadium; Attendance: 7,445; Referee: Anastasios Sidiropoulos (Dodecanese); Man of the Match: Loren Morón

==== Play-off round ====
===== Table =====
Pos	Team	Pld	W	D	L	GF	GA	GD	Pts	Qualification
1	PAOK (C)	36	25	5	6	87	34	+53	80	Qualification for the Champions League second qualifying round
2	AEK Athens	36	23	9	4	80	35	+45	78	Qualification for the Conference League second qualifying round
3	Olympiacos	36	23	5	8	78	36	+42	74	Qualification for the Europa League league phase (Note: Olympiacos qualified for the Europa League league phase as 2023–24 UEFA Europa Conference League winners.)
4	Panathinaikos	36	22	6	8	82	37	+45	72	Qualification for the Europa League second qualifying round (Note: Panathinaikos qualified for the Europa League second qualifying round as 2023–24 Greek Cup winners.)
5	Aris	36	16	7	13	51	44	+7	55	
6	Lamia	36	9	8	19	43	79	−36	35	

Source: Super League Greece
Rules for classification: 1) Points; 2) Head-to-head points (Regular season and play-off); 3) Head-to-head goal difference (Regular season and play-off); 4) Regular season position.
(C) Champions

===== Results summary =====
Overall								Home						Away					
Pld	W	D	L	GF	GA	GD	Pts	W	D	L	GF	GA	GD	W	D	L	GF	GA	GD
10	6	1	3	20	8	+12	19	4	1	0	11	2	+9	2	0	3	9	6	+3

Last updated: 2024-03-10.
Source: Super League Greece

===== Results by Matchday =====
Round	1	2	3	4	5	6	7	8	9	10
Ground	A	H	A	H	H	A	H	A	A	H
Result	W	W	L	D	W	W	W	L	L	W
Position	1	1	2	2	1	1	1	1	2	2

Updated to match(es) played on 22 April 2024. Source: slgr.gr
A = Away; H = Home; W = Win; D = Draw; L = Loss; P = Postponed

===== Matches =====
10 March 2024 1	Lamia	0–4	AEK Athens	Lamia
17:00 EET (UTC+2)	Stanko (yellow card) 12'; Malçi (yellow card) 45+4'; Tsoukalos (yellow card) 72'	Report	Callens 45+2'; Rota (yellow card) 52'; Ponce 68'; García 89', 90+3'	Stadium: Lamia Municipal Stadium; Attendance: Behind closed doors Referee: Evangelos Manouchos (Argolida); Man of the Match: Levi García
Note: The match was held behind closed doors, due to the decision of Standing Committee Against Violence, as the stadium of Lamia did not meet the conditions set by the anti-violence law and more specifically the cameras of the electronic surveillance system were not fully operational.

31 March 2024 2	AEK Athens	1–0	Olympiacos	Nea Filadelfeia
20:30 EEST (UTC+3)	Rota (yellow card) 52'; Szymański (yellow card) 59'; Eliasson 90+1'	Report	Podence (yellow card) 38'; Chiquinho (yellow card) 41'; Retsos (yellow card) 57'; Fortounis (yellow card) 74'	Stadium: Agia Sophia Stadium; Attendance: 31,100; Referee: Matej Jug (Slovenia); Man of the Match: Georgios Athanasiadis

3 April 2024 3	Panathinaikos	2–1	AEK Athens	Ampelokipoi
21:00 EEST (UTC+3)	Bakasetas 33'; Ioannidis 35', (yellow card) 85'; Bernard (yellow card) 71'; Akaydin (yellow card) 90+1'; Vilhena (yellow card) 90+6'	Report	Vida 5'; Szymański (yellow card) 25'; Jønsson (yellow card) 27'; Mantalos (yellow card) 90+6'	Stadium: Leoforos Alexandras Stadium; Attendance: 12,101; Referee: Claudio Pereira (Portugal); Man of the Match: Fotis Ioannidis

7 April 2024 4	AEK Athens	2–2	PAOK	Nea Filadelfeia
20:30 EEST (UTC+3)	Gaćinović 30', (yellow card) 36'; Amrabat 49', (yellow card) 71'; Szymański (yellow card) 61'; Vida (yellow card) 68'; Ponce (yellow card) 80'; Athanasiadis (yellow card) 84'	Report	Murg (yellow card) 27'; Meïté (yellow card) 28'; Jonny (yellow card) 48'; Baba 62', (yellow card) 68'; Živković (yellow card) 77'; Ozdoev 89'; Sastre (yellow card) 90+6'	Stadium: Agia Sophia Stadium; Attendance: 31,080; Referee: Tobias Stieler (Germany); Man of the Match: Nordin Amrabat

14 April 2024 5	AEK Athens	2–0	Aris	Nea Filadelfeia
20:30 EEST (UTC+3)	Ponce 9', 14'; Callens (yellow card) 34'; Gaćinović (yellow card) 60'	Report	Verstraete (yellow card) 6'; Saverio (yellow card) 20'; Brabec (yellow card) 49'; Fattore (yellow card) 73'; Odubajo (yellow card) 86'	Stadium: Agia Sophia Stadium; Attendance: 27,313; Referee: Evangelos Manouchos (Argolida); Man of the Match: Ezequiel Ponce

21 April 2024 6	Aris	1–2	AEK Athens	Thessaloniki
19:30 EEST (UTC+3)	Fattore (yellow card) 6'; Verstraete (yellow card) 24'; Morón 36'; Montoya (yellow card) 40'; Rose (yellow card) 51'; Zamora (yellow card) 67'; Ansarifard (yellow card) 82'	Report	Szymański (yellow card) 35'; Sidibé 49'; Amrabat (yellow card) 75', (goal) 84'	Stadium: Kleanthis Vikelidis Stadium; Attendance: 3,793; Referee: Christos Vergetis (Arcadia); Man of the Match: Nordin Amrabat

24 April 2024 7	AEK Athens	3–0	Panathinaikos	Nea Filadelfeia
20:30 EEST (UTC+3)	Eliasson 7', 69'; Ponce 38'	Report	Jedvaj (yellow card) 63'; Akaydin (yellow card) 68'	Stadium: Agia Sophia Stadium; Attendance: 31,100; Referee: Willy Delajod (France); Man of the Match: Niclas Eliasson

28 April 2024 8	PAOK	3–2	AEK Athens	Thessaloniki
19:30 EEST (UTC+3)	Konstantelias 3', 81', (yellow card) 41'; Thomas (yellow card) 21'; Otto (yellow card) 38'; Sastre 90'; Živković (yellow card) 90+9'	Report	Pineda 10'; Rota (yellow card) 20'; Araujo (yellow card) 64'; Vida 75'; Zuber (yellow card) 89'	Stadium: Toumba Stadium; Attendance: 17,362; Referee: Robert Schröder (Germany); Man of the Match: Giannis Konstantelias

15 May 2024 9	Olympiacos	2–0	AEK Athens	Piraeus
20:00 EEST (UTC+3)	Horta 65', 90+2'; Quini (yellow card) 74'; Chiquinho (yellow card) 84'	Report		Stadium: Georgios Karaiskakis Stadium; Attendance: 30,020; Referee: Tobias Stieler (Germany); Man of the Match: André Horta

19 May 2024 10	AEK Athens	3–0	Lamia	Nea Filadelfeia
20:00 EEST (UTC+3)	Ljubičić 20'; Zuber 40'; Vida (yellow card) 54'; Szymański 90+2'	Report	Santana (yellow card) 45'	Stadium: Agia Sophia Stadium; Attendance: 31,100; Referee: Morten Krogh (Denmark); Man of the Match: Robert Ljubičić

=== Greek Cup ===
AEK Athens entered the Greek Cup at the round of 16.

==== Round of 16 ====
10 January 2024 First leg	AEK Athens	0–0	Aris	Nea Filadelfeia
19:30 EET (UTC+2)		Report	Suleymanov (yellow card) 32'	Stadium: Agia Sophia Stadium; Attendance: Behind closed doors Referee: Matej Jug (Slovenia); Man of the Match: Jens Jønsson

17 January 2024 Second leg	Aris	1–1 (a.e.t.) (1–1 agg.) (4–2 p)	AEK Athens	Thessaloniki
19:00 EET (UTC+2)	Fabiano (yellow card) 57'; Morón 58'; Odubajo (yellow card) 71'	Report	Sidibé (yellow card) 8'; Gaćinović 45+1'; Rota (yellow card) 56'; Pilios (yellow card) 65'; Mantalos (yellow card) 79'; Pizarro (yellow card) 90'; Athanasiadis (yellow card) 113'; Mitoglou (yellow card) 116'	Stadium: Kleanthis Vikelidis Stadium; Attendance: Behind closed doors Referee: Nikola Dabanović (Montenegro)
	Penalties
	Fabiano (penalty scored); Morón (penalty scored); Fetfatzidis (penalty missed); Darida (penalty scored); Verstraete (penalty scored)		(penalty missed) Vida; (penalty scored) Van Weert; (penalty missed) Ponce; (penalty scored) Pineda

=== UEFA Champions League ===
==== Third qualifying round ====
The draw for the third qualifying round was held on 24 July 2023.

15 August 2023 First leg	Dinamo Zagreb (Croatia)	1–2	(Greece) AEK Athens	Zagreb, Croatia
21:00 EEST (UTC+3)	Bulat 39'; Ivanušec (yellow card) 55'	Report	Hajsafi (yellow card) 57'; Zuber 59'; Galanopoulos 90'; Mantalos (yellow card) 90+5'	Stadium: Stadion Maksimir; Attendance: 13,311; Referee: João Pinheiro (Portugal)

19 August 2023 Second Leg	AEK Athens (Greece)	2–2 (4–3 agg.)	(Croatia) Dinamo Zagreb	Athens, Greece
21:45 EEST (UTC+3)	Amrabat (yellow card) 81'; Araujo 90+2'; Moukoudi (yellow card) 90+6'; García (penalty missed) 90+10'; Vida 90+10'	Report	Ivanušec (yellow card) 32'; J. Šutalo 45+2', (yellow card) 83'; Ljubičić 65'; Mišić (yellow card) 70'; Mykhaylichenko (yellow card) 78'; Marin (yellow card) 90+2'	Stadium: Agia Sophia Stadium; Attendance: 30,100; Referee: Espen Eskås (Norway)
Note: The match was originally scheduled for 8 August at 21:45 as the first leg of the tie, but on the eve of the match, over 100 ultras of Dinamo Zagreb, despite the ban by UEFA, crossed Greece by road and joined by Panathinaikos ultras, reached the stadium of AEK, where they caused incidents and attacked the locals. The result was the death of a fan of AEK by multiple stab wounds. UEFA decided to postpone the match. The match was rescheduled for 19 August and became the second leg of the tie.

==== Play-off round ====
The draw for the play-off round was held on 7 August 2023.

22 August 2023 First leg	Royal Antwerp (Belgium)	1–0	(Greece) AEK Athens	Antwerp, Belgium
22:00 EEST (UTC+3)	Janssen 16'; Bataille (red card) 50'; De Laet (yellow card) 67'; Butez (yellow card) 90+2'	Report	Szymański (yellow card) 25'; Pineda (yellow card) 53'	Stadium: Bosuilstadion; Attendance: 13,376; Referee: François Letexier (France)

30 August 2023 Second Leg	AEK Athens (Greece)	1–2 (1–3 agg.)	(Belgium) Royal Antwerp	Athens, Greece
22:00 EEST (UTC+3)	Araujo 90'; Mantalos (yellow card) 90+7'	Report	Kerk 73'; Balikwisha 90+5'	Stadium: Agia Sophia Stadium; Attendance: 29,300; Referee: Jesús Gil Manzano (Spain)

=== UEFA Europa League ===
==== Group stage ====
The draw for the group stage was held on 1 September 2023.

Pos	Team	Pld	W	D	L	GF	GA	GD	Pts	Qualification	BHA	MAR	AJA	AEK
1	(England) Brighton & Hove Albion	6	4	1	1	10	5	+5	13	Advance to round of 16	—	1–0	2–0	2–3
2	(France) Marseille	6	3	2	1	14	10	+4	11	Advance to knockout round play-offs	2–2	—	4–3	3–1
3	(Netherlands) Ajax	6	1	2	3	10	13	−3	5	Transfer to Europa Conference League	0–2	3–3	—	3–1
4	(Greece) AEK Athens	6	1	1	4	6	12	−6	4		0–1	0–2	1–1	—

Source: UEFA

===== Matches =====
21 September 2023 1	Brighton & Hove Albion (England)	2–3	(Greece) AEK Athens	Brighton and Hove, England
22:00 EEST (UTC+3)	João Pedro 30' (pen.), 66' (pen.); Igor (yellow card) 47'; Estupiñán (yellow card) 66'; Van Hecke (yellow card) 76'	Report	Sidibé 11', (yellow card) 47'; Gaćinović 40', (yellow card) 72'; Szymański (yellow card) 66'; Mitoglou (yellow card) 66'; Ponce (yellow card) 69', (goal) 84'; Eliasson (yellow card) 90'; Mantalos (yellow card) 90+8'; Mohammadi (yellow card) 90+10'	Stadium: Falmer Stadium; Attendance: 30,183; Referee: Kristo Tohver (Estonia)

5 October 2023 2	AEK Athens (Greece)	1–1	(Netherlands) Ajax	Athens, Greece
19:45 EET (UTC+2)	Vida (yellow card) 40', (goal) 74'; Pineda (yellow card) 52'; Araujo (yellow card) 90'; Amrabat (yellow card) 90'	Report	Bergwijn 30' (pen.); Brobbey (yellow card) 56'; Šutalo (yellow card) 61'	Stadium: Agia Sophia Stadium; Attendance: 29,524; Referee: Matej Jug (Slovenia)

26 October 2023 3	Marseille (France)	3–1	(Greece) AEK Athens	Marseille, France
19:45 EET (UTC+2)	Balerdi (yellow card) 26'; Vitinha 27'; Clauss (yellow card) 32'; Harit 60' (pen.); Veretout 69' (pen.)	Report	Sidibé (yellow card) 12'; Rota (yellow card) 45+3'; Pineda 53'; Stanković (red card) 57'; Amrabat (yellow card) 69'; Jønsson (yellow card) 83'	Stadium: Stade Vélodrome; Attendance: 65,092; Referee: Daniel Stefański (Poland)

9 November 2023 4	AEK Athens (Greece)	0–2	(France) Marseille	Athens, Greece
22:00 EET (UTC+2)	Gaćinović (yellow card) 28'; Ponce (yellow card) 66'	Report	Mbemba 25'; Vitinha (yellow card) 45+3'; Sarr 90+3'	Stadium: Agia Sophia Stadium; Attendance: 30,530; Referee: Glenn Nyberg (Sweden)

30 November 2023 5	AEK Athens (Greece)	0–1	(England) Brighton & Hove Albion	Athens, Greece
19:45 EET (UTC+2)	Gaćinović (yellow card) 27' (yellow-red card) 65'; Zuber (yellow card) 63'	Report	Veltman (yellow card) 12'; João Pedro 55' (pen.)	Stadium: Agia Sophia Stadium; Attendance: 30,520; Referee: Sandro Schärer (Switzerland)

14 December 2023 6	Ajax (Netherlands)	3–1	(Greece) AEK Athens	Amsterdam, Netherlands
22:00 EET (UTC+2)	Akpom 5', 56'; Brobbey (yellow card) 8'; Sosa (yellow card) 10'; Taylor 20'; Hato (yellow card) 54'; Šutalo (yellow card) 76'	Report	García 11'; Amrabat (yellow card) 15'; Vida (yellow card) 35'; Moukoudi (yellow card) 45+2'	Stadium: Johan Cruyff Arena; Attendance: 53,926; Referee: Craig Pawson (England)

== Statistics ==
=== Squad statistics ===
As of 19 May 2024

No.	Pos	Player	Super League		Super League Play-offs		Greek Cup		Champions League		Europa League		Total	
No.	Pos	Player	Apps	Goals	Apps	Goals	Apps	Goals	Apps	Goals	Apps	Goals	Apps	Goals
Goalkeepers
1	GK	(Austria) Cican Stanković	21	0	8	0	0	0	3	0	4	0	36	0
30	GK	(Greece) Georgios Athanasiadis	5	0	2	0	2	0	1	0	3	0	13	0
Defenders
2	DF	(Cameroon) Harold Moukoudi	7	1	3	0	0	0	4	0	5	0	19	1
12	DF	(Greece) Lazaros Rota	14	2	8	0	1	0	2	0	3	0	28	2
17	DF	(Greece) Stavros Pilios	10	0	1	0	2	0	0	0	0	0	13	0
18	DF	(Peru) Alexander Callens	18	1	7	1	0	0	0	0	0	0	25	2
21	DF	(Croatia) Domagoj Vida	19	4	10	2	1	0	4	1	5	1	39	8
24	DF	(Greece) Gerasimos Mitoglou	12	0	1	0	2	0	0	0	1	0	16	0
28	DF	(Iran) Ehsan Hajsafi	9	0	10	0	0	0	4	0	6	0	29	0
29	DF	(France) Djibril Sidibé	13	0	4	1	2	0	2	0	4	1	25	2
Midfielders
4	MF	(Poland) Damian Szymański	17	1	9	1	1	0	4	0	6	0	37	2
6	MF	(Denmark) Jens Jønsson	21	2	10	0	2	0	4	0	4	0	41	2
8	MF	(Serbia) Mijat Gaćinović	18	2	8	1	2	1	3	0	4	1	35	5
13	MF	(Mexico) Orbelín Pineda	23	2	10	1	2	0	4	0	5	1	44	4
19	MF	(Sweden) Niclas Eliasson	26	5	10	3	1	0	4	0	6	0	47	8
20	MF	(Greece) Petros Mantalos	21	1	7	0	1	0	4	0	6	0	39	1
22	MF	(Spain) Paolo Fernandes	5	0	3	0	1	0	0	0	0	0	9	0
23	MF	(Croatia) Robert Ljubičić	6	2	5	1	0	0	0	0	0	0	11	3
25	MF	(Greece) Konstantinos Galanopoulos	13	0	1	0	0	0	2	1	3	0	19	1
70	MF	(Mexico) Rodolfo Pizarro	16	0	0	0	2	0	2	0	2	0	22	0
Forwards
5	FW	(Morocco) Nordin Amrabat	18	4	9	2	2	0	4	0	6	0	39	6
7	FW	(Trinidad and Tobago) Levi García	12	11	8	2	1	0	3	0	3	1	27	14
9	FW	(Netherlands) Tom van Weert	6	1	0	0	1	0	0	0	0	0	7	1
10	FW	(Switzerland) Steven Zuber	24	6	7	1	2	0	4	1	5	0	42	8
11	FW	(Argentina) Sergio Araujo	17	1	8	0	2	0	4	2	4	0	35	3
14	FW	(Argentina) Ezequiel Ponce	19	11	10	4	2	0	2	0	5	1	38	16
53	FW	(Greece) Theodosis Macheras	0	0	0	0	0	0	0	0	0	0	0	0
90	FW	(Angola) Zini	11	0	0	0	0	0	0	0	0	0	11	0
Left during Winter Transfer Window
3	DF	(Iran) Milad Mohammadi	10	1	0	0	0	0	0	0	4	0	14	1
From AEK Athens B
39	GK	(Greece) Panagiotis Ginis	0	0	0	0	0	0	0	0	0	0	0	0
99	GK	(Greece) Georgios Theocharis	0	0	0	0	0	0	0	0	0	0	0	0
37	DF	(Bosnia and Herzegovina) Vedad Radonja	2	0	0	0	0	0	0	0	0	0	2	0
55	DF	(Greece) Konstantinos Chrysopoulos	1	0	0	0	0	0	0	0	0	0	1	0
63	DF	(Ghana) Rockson Yeboah	0	0	0	0	0	0	0	0	0	0	0	0
44	MF	(Bosnia and Herzegovina) Anel Šabanadžović	0	0	0	0	0	0	0	0	0	0	0	0
46	MF	(Greece) Konstantinos Roukounakis	0	0	0	0	0	0	0	0	0	0	0	0
96	MF	(The Gambia) Jallow Lamarana	0	0	0	0	0	0	0	0	0	0	0	0
97	MF	(Trinidad and Tobago) Judah García	0	0	0	0	0	0	0	0	0	0	0	0
72	FW	(Greece) Apostolos Christopoulos	0	0	0	0	0	0	0	0	0	0	0	0
82	FW	(Greece) Spyros Skondras	0	0	0	0	0	0	0	0	0	0	0	0

=== Goalscorers ===
As of 19 May 2024
The list is sorted by competition order when total goals are equal, then by position and then by squad number.

Rank	No.	Pos.	Player	Super League	Super League Play-offs	Greek Cup	Champions League	Europa League	Total
1	14	FW	(Argentina) Ezequiel Ponce	11	4	0	0	1	16
2	7	FW	(Trinidad and Tobago) Levi García	11	2	0	0	1	14
3	10	FW	(Switzerland) Steven Zuber	6	1	0	1	0	8
3	19	MF	(Sweden) Niclas Eliasson	5	3	0	0	0	8
3	21	DF	(Croatia) Domagoj Vida	4	2	0	1	1	8
6	5	FW	(Morocco) Nordin Amrabat	4	2	0	0	0	6
7	8	MF	(Serbia) Mijat Gaćinović	2	1	1	0	1	5
8	13	MF	(Mexico) Orbelín Pineda	2	1	0	0	1	4
9	23	MF	(Croatia) Robert Ljubičić	2	1	0	0	0	3
9	11	FW	(Argentina) Sergio Araujo	1	0	0	2	0	3
11	12	DF	(Greece) Lazaros Rota	2	0	0	0	0	2
11	6	MF	(Denmark) Jens Jønsson	2	0	0	0	0	2
11	18	DF	(Peru) Alexander Callens	1	1	0	0	0	2
11	4	MF	(Poland) Damian Szymański	1	1	0	0	0	2
11	29	DF	(France) Djibril Sidibé	0	1	0	0	1	2
16	2	DF	(Cameroon) Harold Moukoudi	1	0	0	0	0	1
16	3	DF	(Iran) Milad Mohammadi	1	0	0	0	0	1
16	20	MF	(Greece) Petros Mantalos	1	0	0	0	0	1
16	9	FW	(Netherlands) Tom van Weert	1	0	0	0	0	1
16	25	MF	(Greece) Konstantinos Galanopoulos	0	0	0	1	0	1
Own goals				2	0	0	0	0	2
Totals				60	20	1	5	6	92

=== Hat-tricks ===
Numbers in superscript represent the goals that the player scored.

Player	Against	Result	Date	Competition	Source
(Argentina) Ezequiel Ponce	(Greece) Atromitos	5–0 (A)	21 January 2024	Super League	

=== Assists ===
As of 19 May 2024
The list is sorted by competition order when total assists are equal, then by position and then by squad number.

Rank	No.	Pos.	Player	Super League	Super League Play-offs	Greek Cup	Champions League	Europa League	Total
1	19	MF	(Sweden) Niclas Eliasson	7	2	0	1	1	11
2	20	MF	(Greece) Petros Mantalos	6	1	0	0	1	8
2	5	FW	(Morocco) Nordin Amrabat	6	1	0	0	1	8
4	7	FW	(Trinidad and Tobago) Levi García	2	1	0	1	1	5
5	4	MF	(Poland) Damian Szymański	4	0	0	0	0	4
5	10	FW	(Switzerland) Steven Zuber	4	0	0	0	0	4
7	13	MF	(Mexico) Orbelín Pineda	2	1	0	0	0	3
7	26	DF	(Iran) Ehsan Hajsafi	1	1	0	0	1	3
9	17	DF	(Greece) Stavros Pilios	2	0	0	0	0	2
10	25	MF	(Greece) Konstantinos Galanopoulos	1	0	0	0	0	1
10	8	MF	(Serbia) Mijat Gaćinović	1	0	0	0	0	1
10	21	DF	(Croatia) Domagoj Vida	0	1	0	0	0	1
10	12	DF	(Greece) Lazaros Rota	0	1	0	0	0	1
10	70	MF	(Mexico) Rodolfo Pizarro	0	0	0	1	0	1
Totals				36	9	0	3	5	53

=== Clean sheets ===
As of 19 May 2024
The list is sorted by competition order when total clean sheets are equal and then by squad number. Clean sheets in games where both goalkeepers participated are awarded to the goalkeeper who started the game. Goalkeepers with no appearances are not included.

Rank	No.	Player	Super League	Super League Play-offs	Greek Cup	Champions League	Europa League	Total
1	1	(Austria) Cican Stanković	9	1	0	0	0	10
2	30	(Greece) Georgios Athanasiadis	1	4	1	0	0	5
Totals			10	5	1	0	0	16

=== Disciplinary record ===
As of 19 May 2024

N	P	Nat.	Name	Super League			Super League Play-offs			Greek Cup			Champions League			Europa League			Total			Notes
N	P	Nat.	Name	Yellow card	Second yellow card	Red card	Yellow card	Second yellow card	Red card	Yellow card	Second yellow card	Red card	Yellow card	Second yellow card	Red card	Yellow card	Second yellow card	Red card	Yellow card	Second yellow card	Red card	Notes
Goalkeepers
1	GK	(Austria)	Cican Stanković															1			1	
30	GK	(Greece)	Georgios Athanasiadis	1			1			1									3			
Defenders
2	DF	(Cameroon)	Harold Moukoudi	1									1			1			3			
12	DF	(Greece)	Lazaros Rota	4			3			1						1			9			
17	DF	(Greece)	Stavros Pilios	1						1									2			
18	DF	(Peru)	Alexander Callens	6			1												7			
21	DF	(Croatia)	Domagoj Vida	3			2									2			7			
24	DF	(Greece)	Gerasimos Mitoglou	1						1						1			3			
28	DF	(Iran)	Ehsan Hajsafi	2									1						3			
29	DF	(France)	Djibril Sidibé			1				1						2			3		1	
Midfielders
4	MF	(Poland)	Damian Szymański	7			4						1			1			13			
6	MF	(Denmark)	Jens Jønsson	3			1									1			5			
8	MF	(Serbia)	Mijat Gaćinović	7			2									3	1		12	1		
13	MF	(Mexico)	Orbelín Pineda	1			1						1			1			4			
19	MF	(Sweden)	Niclas Eliasson	1			1												2			
20	MF	(Greece)	Petros Mantalos	4		1				1			2			1			8		1	
22	MF	(Spain)	Paolo Fernandes																			
23	MF	(Croatia)	Robert Ljubičić	1															1			
25	MF	(Greece)	Konstantinos Galanopoulos	4															4			
70	MF	(Mexico)	Rodolfo Pizarro	2						1									3			
Forwards
5	FW	(Morocco)	Nordin Amrabat				2						1			3			6			
7	FW	(Trinidad and Tobago)	Levi García																			
9	FW	(Netherlands)	Tom van Weert																			
10	FW	(Switzerland)	Steven Zuber	3												1			4			
11	FW	(Argentina)	Sergio Araujo	2			1									1			4			
14	FW	(Argentina)	Ezequiel Ponce				1									2			3			
53	FW	(Greece)	Theodosis Macheras																			
90	FW	(Angola)	Zini																			
Left during Winter Transfer Window
3	DF	(Iran)	Milad Mohammadi	1												1			2			
From AEK Athens B
39	GK	(Greece)	Panagiotis Ginis																			
99	GK	(Greece)	Georgios Theocharis																			
37	DF	(Bosnia and Herzegovina)	Vedad Radonja																			
55	DF	(Greece)	Konstantinos Chrysopoulos																			
63	DF	(Ghana)	Rockson Yeboah																			
44	MF	(Bosnia and Herzegovina)	Anel Šabanadžović																			
46	MF	(Greece)	Konstantinos Roukounakis																			
96	MF	(The Gambia)	Jallow Lamarana																			
97	MF	(Trinidad and Tobago)	Judah García																			
72	FW	(Greece)	Apostolos Christopoulos																			
82	FW	(Greece)	Spyros Skondras																			

=== Starting 11 ===
This section presents the most frequently used formation along with the players with the most starts across all competitions.

N.	Formation	Matchday(s)
48	4–1–3–2	1–26

No.	Nat.	Player	Pos.
1	(Austria)	Cican Stanković	GK
21	(Croatia)	Domagoj Vida	RCB
18	(Peru)	Alexander Callens	LCB
12	(Greece)	Lazaros Rota	RB
26	(Iran)	Ehsan Hajsafi	LB
4	(Poland)	Damian Szymański	DM
19	(Sweden)	Niclas Eliasson	RM
8	(Serbia)	Mijat Gaćinović	LM
6	(Denmark)	Jens Jønsson	AM
13	(Mexico)	Orbelín Pineda	SS
10	(Switzerland)	Steven Zuber (C)	CF

Last updated: 2024-05-19

== Awards ==
Player	Pos.	Award	Source
(Serbia) Mijat Gaćinović	MF	Stoiximan Best Goal (2nd Matchday)	
(Switzerland) Steven Zuber	FW	Stoiximan Best Goal (3rd Matchday)	
(France) Djibril Sidibé	DF	UEL Goal of the Week (1st Matchday)	
(Switzerland) Steven Zuber	FW	Stoiximan Best Goal (8th Matchday)	
(Mexico) Orbelín Pineda	MF	Stoiximan Best Goal (9th Matchday)	
(Sweden) Niclas Eliasson	MF	Stoiximan Player of the Month (October)	
(Trinidad and Tobago) Levi García	FW	Stoiximan Best Goal (17th Matchday)	
(Argentina) Ezequiel Ponce	FW	Stoiximan Best Goal (20th Matchday)	
(Switzerland) Steven Zuber	FW	Stoiximan Best Goal (24th Matchday)	
(Argentina) Ezequiel Ponce	FW	Stoiximan Player Of The Month (February)	
(Trinidad and Tobago) Levi García	FW	Stoiximan Best Goal Playoffs (1st & 2nd Matchday)	
(Argentina) Ezequiel Ponce	FW	Stoiximan Best Goal Playoffs (5th & 6th Matchday)	
(Sweden) Niclas Eliasson	MF	Stoiximan Player of the Club	
(Croatia) Domagoj Vida	DF	Team of the Season	
(Mexico) Orbelín Pineda	MF	Team of the Season	
(Sweden) Niclas Eliasson	MF	Team of the Season	
