= Marin Aničić =

Bosnian footballer (born 1989)

Personal information
- Date of birth: 17 August 1989 (age 37)
- Place of birth: Mostar, SFR Yugoslavia
- Height: 1.92 m (6 ft 4 in)
- Position: Centre-back

Youth career
- Zrinjski Mostar

Senior career*
Years	Team	Apps	(Gls)
2007–2014	Zrinjski Mostar	141	(6)
2014–2019	Astana	148	(5)
2019–2022	Konyaspor	31	(1)
2022–2024	Sarajevo	23	(1)
Total		343	(13)

International career
2009–2010	Bosnia and Herzegovina U21	6	(0)
2016	Bosnia and Herzegovina	1	(0)
- * Club domestic league appearances and goals

Marin Aničić (Bosnian pronunciation: [mǎriːn ǎnitʃitɕ]; born 17 August 1989) is a Bosnian former professional footballer who played as a centre-back.

Aničić started his professional career at Zrinjski Mostar, before joining Astana in 2014. Five years later, he moved to Konyaspor. In 2022, he signed with Sarajevo.

A former youth international for Bosnia and Herzegovina, Aničić made his senior international debut in 2016.

== Club career ==
=== Early career ===
Aničić came through youth academy of his hometown club Zrinjski Mostar. He made his professional debut against Slavija on 28 November 2007 at the age of 18. On 2 April 2008, he scored his first professional goal in a triumph over Orašje.

=== Astana ===
In February 2014, Aničić was transferred to Kazakh side Astana for an undisclosed fee. On 15 March, he made his official debut for the team against Zhetysu. He won his first trophy with the club on 9 November, when they were crowned league champions for the first time in their history.

Aničić helped Astana make their first historical UEFA Champions League appearance in 2015–16 season. On 15 September 2015, he debuted in the competition away at Benfica. Two months later, he scored his first goal in the tournament against same opponent, which was his first goal for the team.

Aničić scored his first league goal in a defeat of Ordabasy on 20 March 2016. In August, he extended his contract until June 2019. On 2 October, he played his 100th game for the side.

He appeared in his 200th match for the club on 14 April 2019.

=== Konyaspor ===
In August, Aničić signed a two-year deal with Turkish outfit Konyaspor. He made his competitive debut for the club on 18 August against Ankaragücü. On 25 July 2020, he scored his first goal for Konyaspor against Alanyaspor.

In January 2021, he suffered a severe knee injury, which was diagnosed as anterior cruciate ligament tear and was ruled out for at least six months. He returned to the pitch on 28 November, over ten months after the injury.

=== Later stage of career ===
In June 2022, Aničić moved to Sarajevo.

== International career ==
Aničić was a member of Bosnia and Herzegovina under-21 team for several years.

In August 2015, he received his first senior call-up, for UEFA Euro 2016 qualifiers against Belgium and Andorra, but had to wait until 25 March 2016 to make his debut in a friendly game against Luxembourg.

== Career statistics ==
=== Club ===
As of match played 26 May 2024

Appearances and goals by club, season and competition
Club	Season	League			National cup (Note: Includes Bosnia and Herzegovina Cup, Kazakhstan Cup, Turkish Cup)		Continental		Other		Total	
Club	Season	Division	Apps	Goals	Apps	Goals	Apps	Goals	Apps	Goals	Apps	Goals
Zrinjski Mostar	2007–08	Bosnian Premier League	4	1	1	0	—		—		5	1
Zrinjski Mostar	2008–09	Bosnian Premier League	23	0	7	0	4 (Note: Appearance(s) in UEFA Cup)	0	—		34	0
Zrinjski Mostar	2009–10	Bosnian Premier League	24	1	6	0	2 (Note: Appearance(s) in UEFA Champions League)	0	—		32	1
Zrinjski Mostar	2010–11	Bosnian Premier League	27	0	5	0	2 (Note: Appearance(s) in UEFA Europa League)	0	—		34	0
Zrinjski Mostar	2011–12	Bosnian Premier League	24	3	3	0	—		—		27	3
Zrinjski Mostar	2012–13	Bosnian Premier League	23	1	7	1	—		—		30	2
Zrinjski Mostar	2013–14	Bosnian Premier League	16	0	2	0	4	0	—		22	0
Zrinjski Mostar	Total		141	6	31	1	12	0	—		184	7
Astana	2014	Kazakhstan Premier League	27	0	2	0	4	0	—		33	0
Astana	2015	Kazakhstan Premier League	29	0	3	0	11	1	1 (Note: Appearance(s) in Kazakhstan Super Cup)	0	44	2
Astana	2016	Kazakhstan Premier League	27	3	2	0	10 (Note: Four appearances, two goals in UEFA Champions League; six appearances, one goal in UEFA Europa League)	3	1	0	40	7
Astana	2017	Kazakhstan Premier League	24	0	0	0	12 (Note: Five appearances in UEFA Champions League; seven appearances, one goal in UEFA Europa League)	1	1	0	37	1
Astana	2018	Kazakhstan Premier League	27	0	0	0	12 (Note: Five appearances in UEFA Champions League; seven appearances, one goal in UEFA Europa League)	1	1	0	40	1
Astana	2019	Kazakhstan Premier League	14	2	0	0	3 (Note: One appearance in UEFA Champions League; two appearances in UEFA Europa League)	0	1	0	18	2
Astana	Total		148	5	7	0	52	6	5	0	212	11
Konyaspor	2019–20	Süper Lig	28	1	0	0	—		—		28	1
Konyaspor	2020–21	Süper Lig	2	0	1	1	—		—		3	1
Konyaspor	2021–22	Süper Lig	1	0	3	0	—		—		4	0
Konyaspor	Total		31	1	4	1	—		—		35	2
Sarajevo	2022–23	Bosnian Premier League	2	0	0	0	—		—		2	0
Sarajevo	2023–24	Bosnian Premier League	21	1	2	0	1 (Note: Appearance(s) in UEFA Europa Conference League)	0	—		24	1
Sarajevo	Total		23	1	2	0	1	0	—		26	1
Total			343	13	44	2	65	6	5	0	457	21

=== International ===
As of match played 25 March 2016

Appearances and goals by national team and year
National team	Year	Apps	Goals
Bosnia and Herzegovina
Bosnia and Herzegovina	2016	1	0
Total		1	0

== Honours ==
Zrinjski Mostar

- Bosnian Premier League: 2008–09
- Bosnian Cup: 2007–08

Astana

- Kazakhstan Premier League: 2014, 2015, 2016, 2017, 2018
- Kazakhstan Cup: 2016
- Kazakhstan Super Cup: 2015, 2018, 2019
