= Jens Jønsson =

Danish footballer (born 1993)

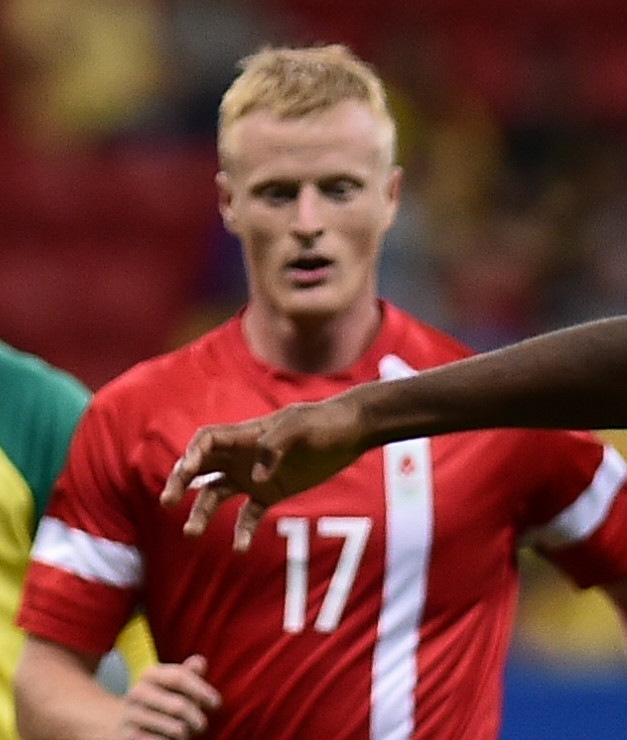
- Jønsson with Denmark Olympics in 2016

Personal information
- Full name: Jens Jønsson
- Date of birth: 10 January 1993 (age 33)
- Place of birth: Aarhus, Denmark
- Height: 1.82 m (6 ft 0 in)
- Position: Midfielder

Team information
- Current team: AGF
- Number: 16

Youth career
- –2005: IF Lyseng
- 2005–2011: AGF

Senior career*
Years	Team	Apps	(Gls)
2011–2016	AGF	107	(2)
2016–2020	Konyaspor	99	(6)
2020–2022	Cádiz	57	(0)
2022–2026	AEK Athens	84	(3)
2026–	AGF	2	(1)

International career^{‡}
2009	Denmark U16	4	(1)
2009–2010	Denmark U17	9	(0)
2011–2012	Denmark U19	6	(0)
2012	Denmark U20	1	(1)
2013–2015	Denmark U21	16	(2)
2016	Denmark Olympic	2	(0)
2020–2021	Denmark	5	(0)
- * Club domestic league appearances and goals as of 09:50, 12 May 2025 (UTC) ‡ National team caps and goals as of 22:44, 15 November 2021

Jens Jønsson (born 10 January 1993) is a Danish professional footballer who plays as a midfielder for Danish Superliga club AGF.

== Club career ==
Born in Aarhus, Denmark, Jønsson moved up to local team AGF's first team in summer 2011. Prior to that he was playing for the IF Lyseng. On 10 December 2012, Jønsson scored a goal for the final result of 3–3 against Silkeborg IF in the last minute of the last match of 2012 in the Danish Superliga. This goal was later awarded "Best Goal of 2012" by the viewers of DR award show "Sport 2012".

On 26 August 2016, he signed a three-year contract with the Turkish Süper Lig club Konyaspor. With Konyaspor he won the Turkish Cup and Super Cup in 2017. At the European level, he was utilised in four group matches of the 2016–17 and 2017–18 UEFA Europa League. Konyaspor was eliminated after the group stage each year.

On 25 August 2020, Jønsson signed a two-year deal with the newly promoted La Liga side Cádiz CF.

=== AEK Athens ===
On 1 July 2022, AEK Athens' technical director Radosław Kucharski travelled to Copenhagen to complete Jønsson's signing, with the Danish player putting pen to paper to a four-year contract.

At the end of the season, he celebrated the double, the third in the club's history and first since 1978.

On 3 September 2023, the Danish midfielder scored his first goal in four years helping to a 3–2 away win against Volos.

== International career ==
On 3 November 2020 he received his first call-up by Denmark senior national team.

== Career statistics ==
=== Club ===
As of match played 21:00, 11 September 2025 (UTC)

Appearances and goals by club, season and competition
Club	Season	League			National Cup		League Cup		Continental		Other		Total	
Club	Season	Division	Apps	Goals	Apps	Goals	Apps	Goals	Apps	Goals	Apps	Goals	Apps	Goals
AGF	2011–12	Superliga	5	0	1	0	—		—		—		6	0
AGF	2012–13	Superliga	15	1	1	0	—		0	0	—		16	1
AGF	2013–14	Superliga	21	1	3	0	—		—		—		24	1
AGF	2014–15	1st Division	31	0	3	0	—		—		—		34	0
AGF	2015–16	Superliga	31	0	5	0	—		—		—		36	0
AGF	2016–17	Superliga	4	0	—		—		—		—		4	0
AGF	Total		107	2	13	0	—		0	0	—		120	2
Konyaspor	2016–17	Süper Lig	24	1	7	0	—		4	0	—		35	1
Konyaspor	2017–18	Süper Lig	21	0	4	0	—		4	0	1	0	30	0
Konyaspor	2018–19	Süper Lig	22	4	0	0	—		—		—		22	4
Konyaspor	2019–20	Süper Lig	32	1	0	0	—		—		—		32	1
Konyaspor	Total		99	6	11	0	—		8	0	1	0	119	6
Cádiz	2020–21	La Liga	35	0	2	0	—		—		—		37	0
Cádiz	2021–22	La Liga	22	0	2	0	—		—		—		24	0
Cádiz	Total		57	0	4	0	—		—		—		61	0
AEK Athens	2022–23	Superleague Greece	34	0	5	0	—		—		—		39	0
AEK Athens	2023–24	Superleague Greece	31	2	2	0	—		8	0	—		41	2
AEK Athens	2024–25	Superleague Greece	19	1	4	0	—		2	0	—		25	1
AEK Athens	2025–26	Superleague Greece	0	0	0	0	—		2	0	—		2	0
AEK Athens	Total		84	3	11	0	—		12	0	—		107	3
Career total			347	11	39	0	1	0	20	0	1	0	407	11

== Honours ==
Konyaspor

- Turkish Cup: 2016–17
- Turkish Super Cup: 2017

AEK Athens

- Super League Greece: 2022–23, 2025–26
- Greek Cup: 2022–23
