= Konstantinos Chrysopoulos =

Greek association footballer

Personal information
- Date of birth: 21 May 2003 (age 23)
- Place of birth: Thessaloniki, Greece
- Height: 1.93 m (6 ft 4 in)
- Position: Centre-back

Team information
- Current team: Asteras Tripolis
- Number: 6

Youth career
- 2019–2022: Aris

Senior career*
Years	Team	Apps	(Gls)
2022–2023	Aris	20	(1)
2022–2023	→ Olympiacos B (loan)	21	(1)
2023–2026	AEK Athens	2	(1)
2023–2025	AEK Athens B	26	(0)
2024–2025	→ Anorthosis (loan)	23	(2)
2026	→ Mantova (loan)	1	(0)
2026–	Asteras Tripolis	1	(0)

International career^{‡}
2023	Greece U21	4	(0)
- * Club domestic league appearances and goals as of 23 August 2026 ‡ National team caps and goals as of 13 October 2023

Konstantinos Chrysopoulos (Greek: Κωνσταντίνος Χρυσόπουλος; born 21 May 2003) is a Greek professional footballer who plays as a centre-back for Super League club Asteras Tripolis.

== Club career ==
Chrysopoulos comes from the youth ranks of Aris. After signing his first professional contract with the club, he joined Olympiacos B on a season-long loan.

=== AEK Athens ===
On 29 June 2023, AEK Athens agreed to purchase 50% of his rights for an estimated amount of €800,000. Four days later the move was made official, with Chrysopolos putting pen to paper to a five-year contract.

=== Anorthosis ===
On 15 August 2024, he joined Anorthosis on a season-long loan.

=== Mantova ===
On 21 January 2026, Chrysopoulos moved on loan to Mantova in Serie B.

== Career statistics ==
=== Club ===
As of 25 May 2025

Club	Season	League			Cup		Continental		Super Cup		Total	
Club	Season	Division	Apps	Goals	Apps	Goals	Apps	Goals	Apps	Goals	Apps	Goals
Olympiacos B (loan)	2022–23	Superleague Greece 2	20	1	—		—		—		20	1
AEK Athens	2023–24	Superleague Greece	1	0	0	0	—		—		1	0
AEK Athens B	2023–24	Superleague Greece 2	26	0	—		—		—		26	0
Anorthosis (loan)	2024–25	Cypriot First Division	23	2	3	0	—		—		26	2
Career total			70	3	3	0	0	0	0	0	73	3
