= Alexander Callens =

Peruvian footballer (born 1992)

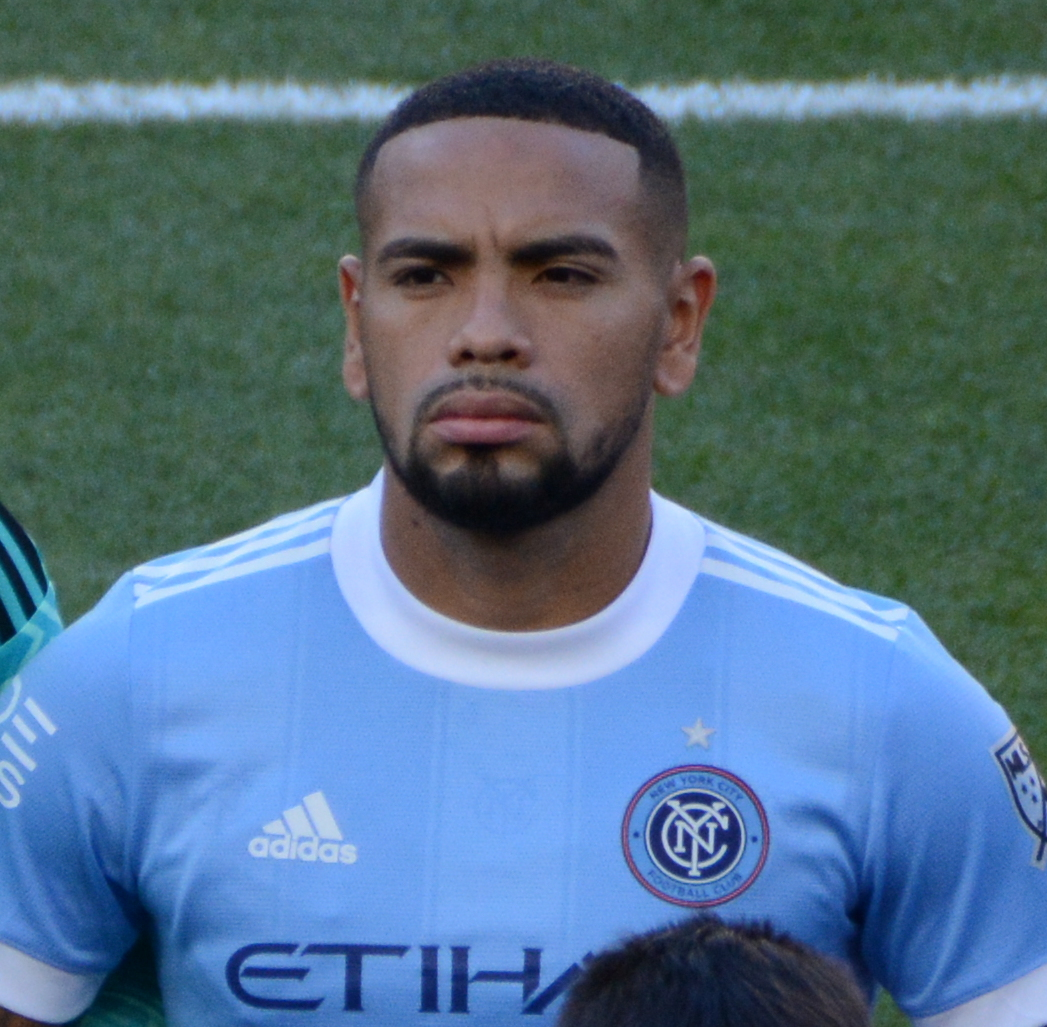
- Callens with New York City in 2022

Personal information
- Full name: Alexander Martín Callens Asín
- Date of birth: 4 May 1992 (age 34)
- Place of birth: Callao, Peru
- Height: 1.85 m (6 ft 1 in)
- Position: Centre-back

Youth career
- Sport Boys

Senior career*
| Years | Team | Apps | (Gls) |
| 2010–2011 | Sport Boys | 30 | (1) |
| 2011–2015 | Real Sociedad B | 86 | (5) |
| 2014 | Real Sociedad | 0 | (0) |
| 2015–2017 | Numancia | 39 | (3) |
| 2017–2022 | New York City | 164 | (11) |
| 2023–2024 | Girona | 6 | (0) |
| 2023–2024 | → AEK Athens (loan) | 25 | (2) |
| 2024–2026 | AEK Athens | 7 | (0) |

International career
| 2011 | Peru U20 | 4 | (1) |
| 2013–2024 | Peru | 51 | (2) |
Medal record
Men's football
Representing Peru
Copa América
| Runner-up | 2019 Brazil |
- * Club domestic league appearances and goals as of 23:00, 24 November 2024 (UTC)

Alexander Martín Callens Asín (born 4 May 1992) is a Peruvian professional footballer who plays as a central defender.

== Club career ==
=== Sport Boys ===
Born in Callao, Callens played youth football with Sport Boys. He made his professional debut on 18 April 2010 in a 3–1 loss at León de Huánuco in the Peruvian Primera División, and scored his first goal on 19 June in another away defeat, 2–1 against Inti Gas Deportes.

=== Spain ===
Callens signed a two-year contract with Real Sociedad from Spain in August 2011, being assigned to the reserves. He went on to spend several Segunda División B seasons with the latter.

On 4 December 2014, Callens made his debut with the first team, featuring the entire second half of the 0–0 draw at Real Oviedo in the round of 32 of the Copa del Rey. On 6 June 2015, he was released.

On 10 August 2015, Callens joined Segunda División side CD Numancia on a one-year deal. He scored his first goal in the league the following 16 January, in a 2–0 away win over Albacete Balompié.

=== New York City ===
On 23 January 2017, Callens terminated his contract and joined New York City FC shortly after. He scored his first goal in the Major League Soccer on 3 June, helping the hosts to beat Philadelphia Union 2–1.

Callens converted his attempt in the penalty shootout victory against the Portland Timbers in the MLS Cup 2021 on 11 December, closing the 4–2 score at Providence Park. On 14 September 2022, he scored from open play to open an eventual 2–0 defeat of Atlas F.C. in the Campeones Cup.

=== Girona ===
Callens returned to Spain in the 2023 January transfer window, on a two-and-a-half-year deal at Girona FC. He played his first match in La Liga on 10 February, coming on as a 46th-minute substitute for Bernardo Espinosa in an eventual 2–0 away loss to Cádiz CF.

=== AEK Athens ===
On 8 September 2023, Callens was loaned to Super League Greece club AEK Athens FC. In June 2024, he signed a permanent two-year contract.

== International career ==
Callens won his first cap for Peru on 17 April 2013, replacing Orlando Contreras in the 74th minute of a 0–0 friendly draw with Mexico held in San Francisco. He scored his first goal for his country on 9 September 2014 in another exhibition game, opening the 2–0 win over Qatar.

Callens was part of the squads at the 2019 and 2021 Copa América tournaments, making five appearances in the latter for the fourth-placed team.

== Personal life ==
In June 2018, Callens earned a U.S. green card, which qualified him as a domestic player for MLS roster purposes.

== Career statistics ==
=== Club ===
As of match played 24 November 2024

Appearances and goals by club, season, and competition
| Club | Season | League | | | National cup (Note: Includes Copa del Rey, U.S. Open Cup, Greek Football Cup) | | Continental | | Other | | Total | |
| Club | Season | Division | Apps | Goals | Apps | Goals | Apps | Goals | Apps | Goals | Apps | Goals |
|---|---|---|---|---|---|---|---|---|---|---|---|---|
| Sport Boys | 2010 | Peruvian Primera División | 24 | 1 | 0 | 0 | — | | — | | 24 | 1 |
| Sport Boys | 2011 | Peruvian Primera División | 6 | 0 | 1 | 0 | — | | — | | 7 | 0 |
| Sport Boys | Total | | 30 | 1 | 1 | 0 | 0 | 0 | 0 | 0 | 31 | 1 |
| Real Sociedad B | 2011–12 | Segunda División B | 5 | 0 | — | | — | | — | | 5 | 0 |
| Real Sociedad B | 2012–13 | Segunda División B | 18 | 0 | — | | — | | — | | 18 | 0 |
| Real Sociedad B | 2013–14 | Segunda División B | 35 | 2 | — | | — | | — | | 35 | 2 |
| Real Sociedad B | 2014–15 | Segunda División B | 28 | 3 | — | | — | | — | | 28 | 3 |
| Real Sociedad B | Total | | 86 | 5 | 0 | 0 | 0 | 0 | 0 | 0 | 86 | 5 |
| Real Sociedad | 2013–14 | La Liga | 0 | 0 | 0 | 0 | — | | — | | 0 | 0 |
| Real Sociedad | 2014–15 | La Liga | 0 | 0 | 1 | 0 | 0 | 0 | — | | 1 | 0 |
| Real Sociedad | Total | | 0 | 0 | 1 | 0 | 0 | 0 | 0 | 0 | 1 | 0 |
| Numancia | 2015–16 | Segunda División | 23 | 2 | 1 | 0 | — | | — | | 24 | 2 |
| Numancia | 2016–17 | Segunda División | 16 | 1 | 0 | 0 | — | | — | | 16 | 1 |
| Numancia | Total | | 39 | 3 | 1 | 0 | 0 | 0 | 0 | 0 | 40 | 3 |
| New York City | 2017 | Major League Soccer | 34 | 2 | 1 | 0 | — | | 1 (Note: Appearances in MLS Cup playoffs) | 0 | 36 | 2 |
| New York City | 2018 | Major League Soccer | 31 | 1 | 0 | 0 | — | | 3 | 0 | 34 | 1 |
| New York City | 2019 | Major League Soccer | 24 | 0 | 0 | 0 | — | | 1 | 0 | 25 | 0 |
| New York City | 2020 | Major League Soccer | 22 | 2 | — | | 4 (Note: Appearances in CONCACAF Champions League) | 2 | 3 (Note: Two appearances in MLS is Back Tournament knockout stage, one appearance in MLS Cup playoffs) | 0 | 29 | 4 |
| New York City | 2021 | Major League Soccer | 26 | 1 | — | | 1 (Note: Appearance in Leagues Cup) | 0 | 4 | 1 | 31 | 2 |
| New York City | 2022 | Major League Soccer | 27 | 5 | 1 | 0 | 6 | 0 | 4 | 1 | 38 | 6 |
| New York City | Total | | 164 | 11 | 2 | 0 | 11 | 2 | 16 | 2 | 193 | 15 |
| Girona | 2022–23 | La Liga | 6 | 0 | — | | — | | — | | 6 | 0 |
| AEK Athens (loan) | 2023–24 | Super League Greece | 25 | 2 | 0 | 0 | — | | — | | 25 | 2 |
| AEK Athens | 2024–25 | Super League Greece | 7 | 0 | 1 | 0 | 3 (Note: Appearances in UEFA Conference League) | 0 | — | | 11 | 0 |
| AEK Athens | 2025–26 | Super League Greece | 0 | 0 | 0 | 0 | 0 | 0 | — | | 0 | 0 |
| AEK Athens | Total | | 32 | 2 | 1 | 0 | 3 | 0 | — | | 36 | 2 |
| Career total | | | 357 | 22 | 6 | 0 | 14 | 2 | 16 | 2 | 393 | 26 |

=== International ===
Appearances and goals by national team and year
| National team | Year | Apps | Goals |
|---|---|---|---|
| Peru | 2013 | 2 | 0 |
| Peru | 2014 | 8 | 1 |
| Peru | 2018 | 1 | 0 |
| Peru | 2019 | 2 | 0 |
| Peru | 2021 | 12 | 0 |
| Peru | 2022 | 11 | 0 |
| Peru | 2023 | 4 | 0 |
| Peru | 2024 | 11 | 1 |
| Total | | 51 | 2 |

Scores and results list Peru's goal tally first, score column indicates score after each Callens goal.

List of international goals scored by Alexander Callens
| No. | Date | Venue | Opponent | Score | Result | Competition |
|---|---|---|---|---|---|---|
| 1 | 9 September 2014 | Abdullah bin Khalifa, Doha, Qatar | Qatar | 1–0 | 2–0 | Friendly |
| 2 | 6 September 2024 | Estadio Nacional, Lima, Peru | Colombia | 1–0 | 1–1 | 2026 FIFA World Cup qualification |

== Honours ==
New York City FC

- MLS Cup: 2021
- Campeones Cup: 2022
