= Selim Ay =

Turkish footballer (born 1991)

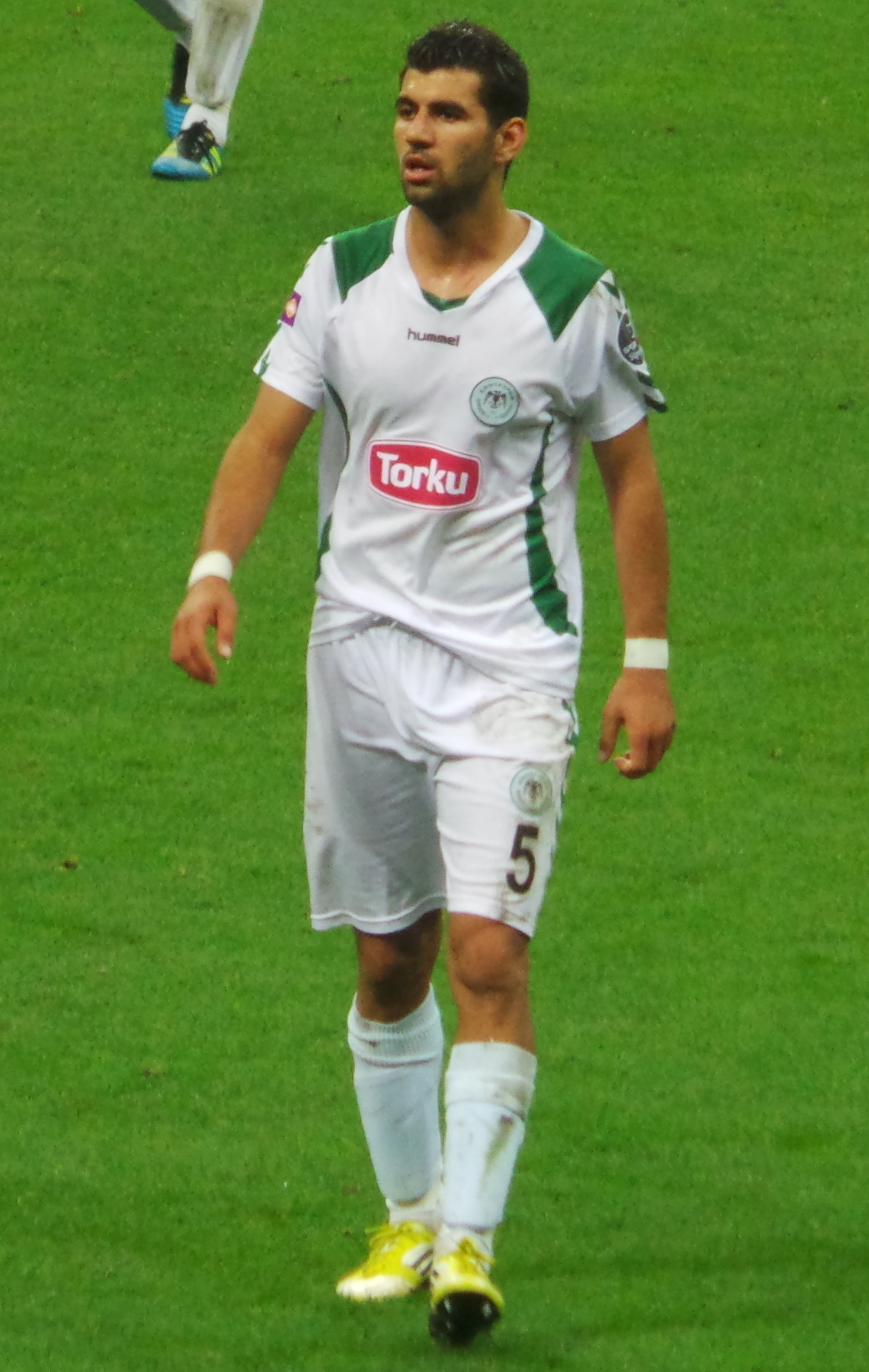

Personal information
- Full name: Selim Ay
- Date of birth: 31 July 1991 (age 35)
- Place of birth: Antalya, Turkey
- Height: 1.84 m (6 ft 0 in)
- Position: Centre back

Team information
- Current team: Kepez Spor Futbol
- Number: 5

Youth career
- 2002–2004: Sidespor
- 2004–2008: Kepez Belediyespor
- 2008–2010: Konyaspor

Senior career*
Years	Team	Apps	(Gls)
2010–2020	Konyaspor	181	(6)
2020–2024	Çaykur Rizespor	43	(4)
2023	→ Altınordu (loan)	8	(0)
2023–2024	→ Tuzlaspor (loan)	9	(0)
2024–	Kepez Spor Futbol	0	(0)

International career^{‡}
2014	Turkey A2	1	(0)
- * Club domestic league appearances and goals as of 22 September 2023 ‡ National team caps and goals as of 27 May 2018

Selim Ay (born 31 July 1991) is a Turkish professional footballer who plays as a centre back for TFF Second League club Kepez Spor Futbol. He made his Süper Lig debut on 17 August 2013 against Fenerbahçe.

== Honours ==
Konyaspor

- Turkish Cup: 2016–17
