= Omar Santana Cabrera =

Spanish footballer

Omar Santana
Personal information
- Full name: Omar Santana Cabrera
- Date of birth: 14 April 1991 (age 35)
- Place of birth: Santa Brígida, Spain
- Height: 1.74 m (5 ft 8 1/2 in)
- Position: Midfielder

Team information
- Current team: San Fernando
- Number: 14

Youth career
- 1997–2009: Universidad LP

Senior career*
Years	Team	Apps	(Gls)
2008–2009	Universidad LP B	24	(0)
2009–2011	Universidad LP	42	(3)
2011–2014	Atlético Madrid B	81	(6)
2014–2015	Celta B	23	(1)
2016	Wigry Suwałki	12	(0)
2017	Wigry Suwałki	10	(0)
2017–2019	Miedź Legnica	49	(3)
2019–2020	Miedź Legnica	13	(2)
2020–2021	Olympiakos Nicosia	24	(1)
2021–2023	Athens Kallithea	44	(2)
2023–2024	Lamia	16	(0)
2024–	San Fernando	1	(0)
- * Club domestic league appearances and goals as of 1 September 2024

Omar Santana Cabrera (born 14 April 1991) is a Spanish professional footballer who plays as a midfielder for San Fernando.

== Career ==
Born in Las Palmas de Gran Canaria, Santana played for the reserve sides of Atlético Madrid and Celta Vigo in Segunda División B, before moving abroad to play in the top two divisions in Poland and the top division in Cyprus.

In September 2021, Santana joined Athens Kallithea FC. Santana would captain the team in the second half of the 2022–23 season.

== Career statistics ==
=== Club ===
As of 27 June 2018.

Club	Season	League			Cup		Continental		Other		Total	
Club	Season	Division	Apps	Goals	Apps	Goals	Apps	Goals	Apps	Goals	Apps	Goals
Universidad Las Palmas	2008–09	Segunda División B	1	0	0	0	–		0	0	1	0
Universidad Las Palmas	2009–10	Segunda División B	13	1	0	0	–		1 (Note: Appearances in the 2010 Segunda División B play-offs)	0	14	1
Universidad Las Palmas	2010–11	Segunda División B	28	4	5 (Note: Appearances in the Copa del Rey)	0	–		0	0	33	2
Universidad Las Palmas	Total		42	5	5	0	0	0	1	0	48	3
Atlético Madrid B	2011–12	Segunda División B	21	3	0	0	–		0	0	21	3
Atlético Madrid B	2012–13	Segunda División B	30	2	0	0	–		0	0	30	2
Atlético Madrid B	2013–14	Segunda División B	30	1	0	0	–		2 (Note: Appearances in the 2014 Segunda División B play-offs)	0	32	1
Atlético Madrid B	Total		81	6	0	0	0	0	0	0	83	6
Celta de Vigo B	2014–15	Segunda División B	23	1	0	0	–		0	0	23	1
Wigry Suwalki	2015–16	I liga	12	0	0	0	–		0	0	13	0
Wigry Suwalki	2016–17	I liga	10	0	1 (Note: Appearances in the Polish Cup)	1	–		0	0	11	1
Wigry Suwalki	Total		22	0	1	1	0	0	0	0	24	1
Miedź Legnica	2017–18	I liga	25	2	2	0	–		0	0	27	2
Miedź Legnica	2018–19	Ekstraklasa	24	1	2	0	–		0	0	26	1
Miedź Legnica	Total		49	3	4	0	0	0	0	0	53	3
Career total			217	15	10	1	0	0	3	0	231	14

== Honours ==
Miedź Legnica

- I liga: 2017–18
