= Erdon Daci =

Macedonian footballer (born 1998)

Personal information
- Date of birth: 4 July 1998 (age 28)
- Place of birth: Skopje, Macedonia
- Height: 1.87 m (6 ft 2 in)
- Position: Forward

Team information
- Current team: Tirana

Youth career
- –2017: Vardar
- 2017–2019: Konyaspor

Senior career*
Years	Team	Apps	(Gls)
2019–2021	Konyaspor	43	(3)
2021–2024	Westerlo	40	(14)
2024	→ Beveren (loan)	9	(1)
2024	Deinze	8	(2)
2025–2026	Zhenis	3	(1)
2026–	Tirana	9	(2)

International career^{‡}
2019–2020	North Macedonia U21	10	(1)
2023	North Macedonia	1	(1)
- * Club domestic league appearances and goals as of 9 March 2025 ‡ National team caps and goals as of 17 October 2023

Erdon Daci (born 4 July 1998) is a Macedonian professional footballer who plays as a forward, currently playing for Abissnet Superiore club Tirana, and the North Macedonia national team.

== Club career ==
On 22 July 2019, Daci signed a professional contract with Konyaspor for 3 years. Daci made his professional debut for Konyaspor in a 0–0 Süper Lig tie with Ankaragücü on 18 August 2019.

On 30 August 2021, Daci signed a three-year contract with Westerlo in Belgium.

On 1 February 2024, Daci was loaned by Beveren.

On 6 September 2024, Daci signed with Deinze for the rest of the 2024–25 season, with an option for 2025–26. He left the club in December 2024 after Deinze was declared bankrupt and ceased operations.

== International career ==
Daci was born in Macedonia and is of Albanian descent. He represented the North Macedonia U21s internationally. He was called up to the senior North Macedonia national team for a set of matches in October 2023.

On 17 October 2023, Daci scored his first goal for North Macedonia on his debut against Armenia in a 3–1 win.

== Career statistics ==
=== International ===
As of match played 17 October 2023

Appearances and goals by national team and year
National team	Year	Apps	Goals
North Macedonia	2023	1	1
North Macedonia	Total	1	1

As of match played 17 October 2023
North Macedonia score listed first, score column indicates score after each Daci goal

List of international goals scored by Erdon Daci
No.	Date	Venue	Cap	Opponent	Score	Result	Competition
1	17 October 2023	Stadion Blagoj Istatov, Strumica, North Macedonia	1	Armenia	3–1	3–1	Friendly

== Honours ==
Westerlo

- Belgian First Division B: 2021–22
