= Olympiacos F.C. =

Greek association football club

Olympiacos
- Full name: Ολυμπιακός Σύνδεσμος Φιλάθλων Πειραιώς; Olympiakos Sýndesmos Filáthlon Peiraiós (Olympiacos Association of fans of Piraeus)
- Nicknames: Thrylos (Legend); Erythrolefkoi (Red-Whites)
- Founded: 10 March 1925; 101 years ago
- Ground: Georgios Karaiskakis Stadium
- Capacity: 33,334
- Owner: Evangelos Marinakis
- President: Evangelos Marinakis
- Head coach: Imanol Alguacil
- League: Super League Greece
- 2025–26: Super League Greece, 2nd of 14
- Website: olympiacos.org
Home colours	Away colours	Third colours

Olympiacos Football Club (Greek: ΠΑΕ Ολυμπιακός Σ.Φ.Π. [olibiaˈkos]), known simply as Olympiacos or Olympiacos Piraeus, are a Greek professional football club based in Piraeus. Part of the major multi-sport club Olympiacos CFP (Greek: Ολυμπιακός Σύνδεσμος Φιλάθλων Πειραιώς, Olympiakós Sýndesmos Filáthlon Peiraiós, lit. 'Olympic Association of Friends-of-sports of Piraeus'), their name was inspired by the ancient Olympic Games and along with the club's emblem, the laurel-crowned Olympic athlete, symbolise the Olympic ideals of ancient Greece. Their home ground is the Karaiskakis Stadium, a 33,334-capacity stadium in Piraeus.

Olympiacos was founded on 16 May 1924. Officially recognized on 10 March 1925 and nicknamed Thrylos (Legend), Olympiacos are the most successful club in Greek football history. They have won 48 league titles, 29 Cups (19 doubles) and 5 Super Cups, being the record holder for all of these competitions. The club won its first European title in 2024 when its U-19 Team won the UEFA Youth League. They also hold one UEFA Europa Conference League and one Balkans Cup. They are one of the few clubs to have won over 100 trophies, having won 176 titles (82 national, 27 regional, 30 Youth and Academy, 34 others, and 3 international). In 2018, without counting regional and other titles and without having won the Conference and Youth leagues, it was ninth in the world in total titles won by a football club.

The club's dominance in domestic football is further evidenced in that all other Greek clubs have won a combined total of 42 league titles while Olympiacos also holds the record for the most consecutive Greek League titles won, with seven in a row in two occasions (1997–2003 and 2011–2017), breaking their own previous record of six consecutive wins in the 1950s (1954–1959), when Olympiacos was unequivocally nicknamed Thrylos (Greek: Θρύλος, "Legend"). Having won the 2014–15 League title, Olympiacos became the only football club in the world to have won five or more consecutive championships five times in their history. They are also the only Greek club to have won six consecutive national Cups (1957–1963) as well as six League titles undefeated (1937, 1938, 1948, 1951, 1954, 1955). Olympiacos are one of only three clubs to have never been relegated from the top flight of Greek football, and by winning the 2012–13 title, their 40th in total, they added a 4th star above their crest, each representing 10 league titles.

At the international level, Olympiacos is the only Greek football club in history to have won a major European trophy by winning the UEFA Conference League in 2023–24. With their historic 2024 triumph, they became the first club outside Europe's top four leagues (Premier League, La Liga, Serie A, Bundesliga) to win a UEFA competition since 2011, and the first European club ever to win two UEFA trophies in a single season, following their youth team's earlier victory in the UEFA Youth League. They also added a 5th, larger star above their crest, representing their Conference League victory. Olympiacos is also the highest ranked Greek club in the UEFA rankings, placing 33rd in the ten-year ranking, and 37th in the five-year ranking as of 2025. Additionally, they are one of the founding members of the European Club Association.

Olympiacos is the most popular football club in Greece, and enjoys strong support from both Greek and non-Greek communities all over the world. With 83,000 registered members as of April 2006, the club was ninth in the 2006 list of football clubs with the most paying members in the world, which increased to 98,000 in 2014. Olympiacos share long standing rivalries with Panathinaikos, with whom they contest the "Derby of the Eternal Enemies", a significant football derby in Greece and one of the best-known around the world, as well as with AEK Athens, PAOK, and with Ethnikos Piraeus until the 1990s, when Ethnikos was relegated from the top division of Greek football.

== History ==
=== Early years (1924–1931) ===
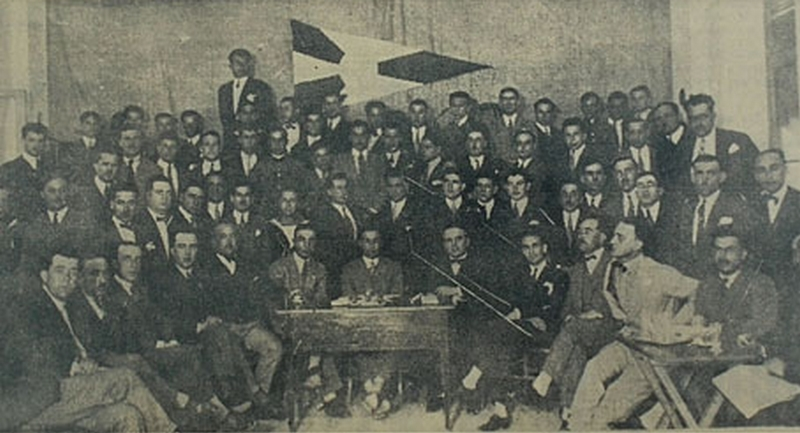
The founders of Olympiacos (1925)

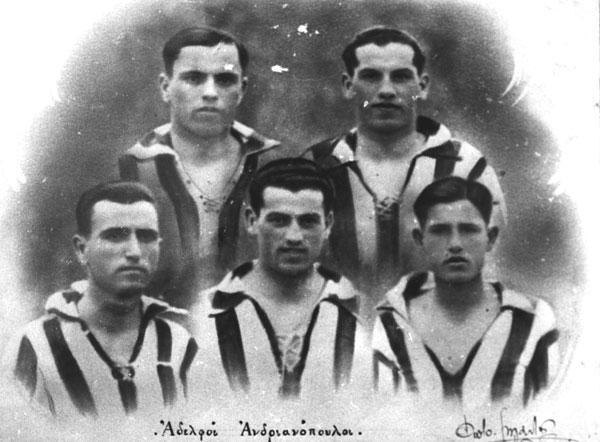
The legendary Andrianopoulos brothers: (from left) Yiannis, Dinos, Giorgos, Vassilis and Leonidas Andrianopoulos

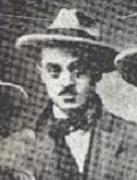
Notis Kamperos inspired the name and the emblem of the club

Olympiacos was founded on 16 May 1924, in the city of Piraeus and played some friendly matches with other clubs. It was officially recognized on 10 March 1925. The club's initial aim, as stated in its statutes, was the systematic cultivation and development of its athletes' possibilities for participation in athletic competitions, the spreading of the Olympic athletic ideal and the promotion of sportsmanship and fanship among the youth according to egalitarian principles, by stressing a healthy, ethical and social basis as its foundation. Members of "Piraikos Podosfairikos Omilos FC" (Sport and Football Club of Piraeus) and "Piraeus Fans Club FC" decided, during a historical assembly, to dissolve the two clubs in order to establish a new unified one, which would bring this new vision and dynamic to the community. Notis Kamperos, a senior officer of the Hellenic Navy, proposed the name Olympiacos and the profile of a laurel-crowned Olympic winner as the emblem of the new club. Kamperos would later comment that he was searching for a name that would "signify strength, athletic power, ethics, fair competition, dominance, and ultimately the Olympic ideal." Michalis Manouskos, a prominent Piraeus industrialist, expanded the name to its complete and current status, Olympiacos Syndesmos Filathlon Pireos. Besides Kamperos and Manouskos, among the most notable founding members were Stavros Maragoudakis, the post office director; Nikos Andronikos, a merchant; Dimitrios Sklias, a Hellenic Army officer; Nikolaos Zacharias, an attorney; Athanasios Mermigas, a notary public; Kostas Klidouchakis, who became the first goalkeeper in the club's history; Ioannis Kekkes, a stockbroker; and above all, the Andrianopoulos family.

The historic statute of Olympiacos states:

A club is hereby founded in Piraeus under the title Olympic Association of Piraeus Sportsmen. The purpose of said club is the advancement of physical education among the youth and the cultivation of a steadfast love of athletics. To attain this purpose, the following means shall be employed a) The establishment of athletic facilities of every nature, b) The organization of all forms of athletic activity, both on land and at sea, c) The arrangement of competitions, celebrations, excursions, hikes, and the like, d) The delivery of lectures and the issuance of printed materials for the propagation of the athletic ideal, e) The promotion by every means of any initiative conducive to the welfare of youth. The seal of the Olympic Association of Piraeus Sportsmen shall depict the head of a laurel-crowned youth, with the name of the club inscribed around it.

Andrianopoulos, a family of well-established Piraeus merchants, played a pivotal role in the founding of Olympiacos. The five brothers, Yiannis, Dinos, Giorgos, Vassilis, and Leonidas Andrianopoulos raised the reputation of the club and brought it to its current glory. According to historians of that era, it was Yiannis who chose the club's colours: red, which symbolised the passion for victory, but also white, which symbolized purity and noble rivalry. Yiannis, Dinos, Giorgos, and Vassilis were the first to play, while Leonidas, the youngest of the five, made his debut later on and played for the club for eight years (1927–1935). The club's offensive line, made up of the five brothers, became legendary, rising to mythical status, and soon Olympiacos gained enormous popularity and became the most successful and well-supported club in Greece. Their fan base consisted mainly of the working class, with the team's home ground at Neo Phaliron Velodrome, before moving to its current Karaiskakis Stadium. They became Piraeus Champions in 1925 and 1926.

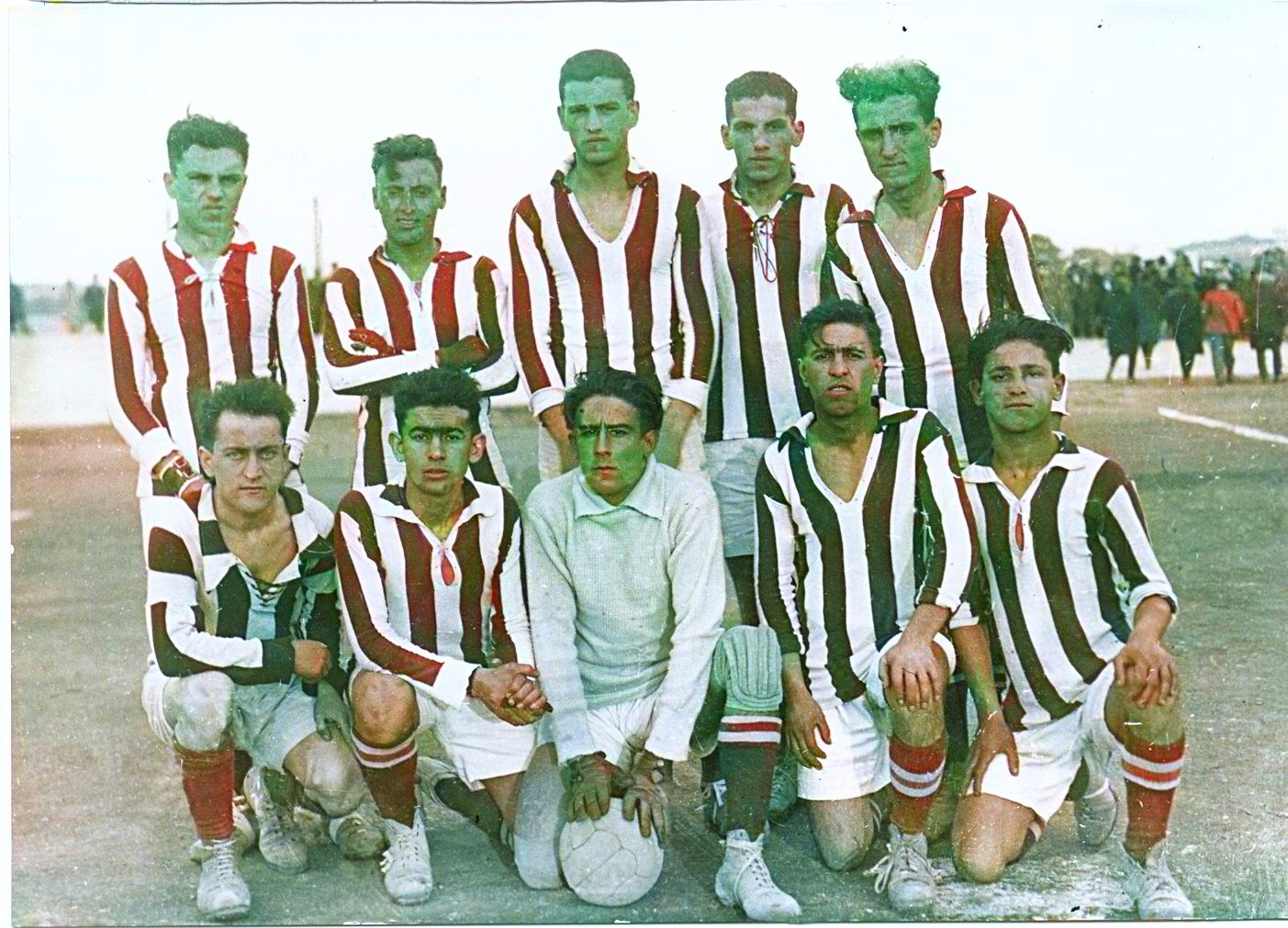
Olympiacos football players in 1925

In 1926, the Hellenic Football Federation was founded and organised the Panhellenic Championship in the 1927–1928 season. This was the first national championship, where the regional champions from EPSA league (Athens), EPSP league (Piraeus) and EPSM league (Thessaloniki) competed for the national title during play-offs, with Aris becoming the first champion. The Panhellenic Championship was organised in this manner up until 1958–59. However, in the second season (1928–29) a dispute arose between Olympiacos and the Hellenic Football Federation and as a result, the club did not participate in the championship, with Panathinaikos and AEK Athens deciding to follow Olympiacos. During the course of that season, the three of them played friendly games with each other and formed a group called P.O.K.

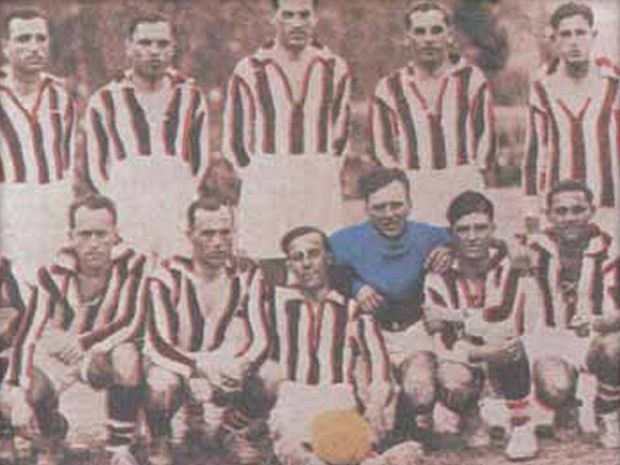
Olympiacos line-up in 1928

Meanwhile, the club continued to dominate the Piraeus Championship, winning the 1926–27, 1928–29, 1929–30 and 1930–31 titles and started establishing themselves as the leading force in Greek football; they set a record by remaining undefeated against all Greek teams for three consecutive seasons (14 March 1926 to 3 March 1929), counting 30 wins and 6 draws in 36 games. Those results ignited an enthusiastic reception from the Greek press, who called Olympiacos Thrylos ("Legend") for the first time in history. The fourth Panhellenic Championship took place in 1930–31 and saw Olympiacos winning the Greece national league title for the first time ever, which was a milestone that marked the beginning of a very successful era in Olympiacos history. Olympiacos put in a great performance during the competition and won the title very convincingly with 11 wins, 2 draws and only one game lost. They managed to score 7 wins in 7 matches at home, beating Panathinaikos, AEK Athens, Aris, Iraklis and PAOK with the same score: 3–1. The sole exception was the match against Ethnikos, where Olympiacos netted 4 goals and won 4–1. Besides the Andrianopoulos brothers and Kostas Klidouchakis, other notable players of the first era in the club's history (1925–1931) were Achilleas Grammatikopoulos, Lalis Lekkos, Philippos Kourantis, Nikos Panopoulos, Charalambos Pezonis and Kostas Terezakis.

=== Domination in Greece and World War II (1931–1946) ===
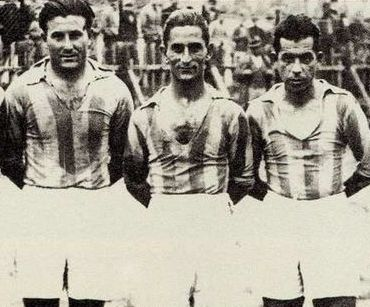
Olympiacos fearsome trio of attackers during the 1930s (from left): Christoforos Raggos, Giannis Vazos, Theologos Symeonidis

The new decade marked a substantial rise in Panhellenic Championship's popularity throughout Greece. In October 1931, Giorgos and Yiannis Andrianopoulos, emblematic players and founding members of Olympiacos, retired from actively playing football. However, new heroes emerged, such as Giannis Vazos, Christoforos Raggos, Theologos Symeonidis, Michalis Anamateros, Spyros Depountis, Aris Chrysafopoulos, Nikos Grigoratos, Panagis Korsianos as well as the iconic brothers Giannis and Vangelis Chelmis and the club won five Championships in nine seasons (1932–33, 1933–34, 1935–36, 1936–37, 1937–38) and by 1940, Olympiacos had already won six Championships in the eleven first seasons of the Panhellenic Championship. Especially Giannis Vazos, Christoforos Raggos and Theologos Symeonidis composed a formidable trio of attacking players, scoring numerous goals and became nothing short of legendary. Giannis Vazos played for 18 years for Olympiacos (1931–1949), and managed to score 450 goals in 364 games (179 goals in 156 official games) for the club, being the club's second all-time scorer, also winning the Greek Championship top scorer award four times (1933, 1936, 1937 and 1947).

In addition, the club managed to win the 1936–37 and 1937–38 Championship titles undefeated. Ιn Greek Cup, the team did not manage to win the competition in its first four editions, despite some outstanding wins such as a record-setting 1–6 away victory against Panathinaikos in Leoforos Alexandras Stadium in 1932 (V. Andrianopoulos 16', 68', 88', Raggos 24', Vazos 69', 70'), which is the biggest away victory in the derby's history.

On 28 October 1940, Fascist Italy invaded Greece, and several Olympiacos players joined the Hellenic Army to fight against the Axis invaders. Chistoforos Raggos was heavily injured in his left leg in January 1941, and wasn't able to play football again. Leonidas Andrianopoulos suffered severe frostbite in the Albanian front and almost died, while Nikos Grigoratos was injured in the leg during the Battle of Klisura. Furthermore, after the subsequent German occupation of Greece, Olympiacos players joined the Greek Resistance and fought fiercely against the Nazis. Olympiacos player Nikos Godas, an emblematic figure for the club, was captain of the Greek People's Liberation Army (ELAS) and fought against the Germans in many fronts. He was executed wearing Olympiacos shirt and shorts, as was his last wish: "Shoot me and kill me with my Olympiacos shirt on, and do not blindfold me, I want to see the colours of my team before the final shot." Michalis Anamateros was also an active member of the Greek Resistance and was killed in 1944. Olympiacos paid a heavy price during the destructive war, the Axis occupation and the ensuing Greek Civil War and the club's progress was put on temporary hold.

=== The Legend (1946–1959) ===
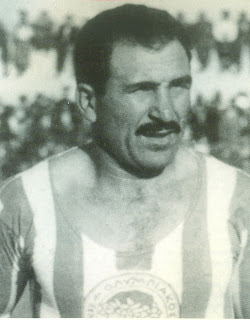
Andreas Mouratis captained Olympiacos and played in 295 games for the club (1945–1955)

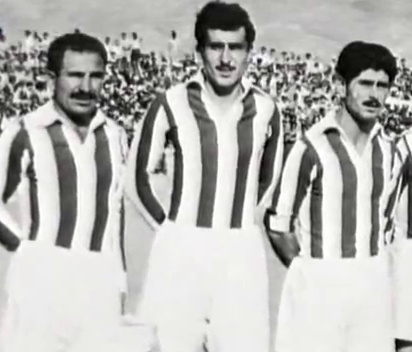
Andreas Mouratis, Babis Kotridis, Ilias Rossidis, key players of the Olympiacos team of the 1950s

After the war, Olympiacos saw many of its key-players of the pre-war era retire, with many significant changes being made in the team's roster. Olympiacos captain and prolific scorer Giannis Vazos remained in the club, along with Giannis Chelmis. New important players joined the club, such as Andreas Mouratis, Alekos Chatzistavridis, Stelios Kourouklatos and Dionysis Minardos. As soon as regular fixtures recommenced, the Piraeus club returned to their dominant position in Greek football. From 1946 to 1959, Olympiacos won 9 out of the 11 Greek Championships (1947, 1948, 1951, 1954, 1955, 1956, 1957, 1958, 1959), bringing home 15 Championship titles in a total of 23 completed seasons of the Greek League. The six-straight Greek Championships won by Olympiacos from 1954 to 1959 was an unmatched achievement in Greek football history, an all-time record which stood for 44 years, up until Olympiacos managed to win seven-straight Greek Championships from 1997 to 2003.

Furthermore, during the same period (1946–1959), the club won 8 Greek Cups out of 13 editions (1947, 1951, 1952, 1953, 1954, 1957, 1958, 1959), thus completing 6 Doubles (1947, 1951, 1954, 1957, 1958, 1959), three of which being consecutive (1957–1959). The legendary Olympiacos team of the 1950s, with key performers such as Andreas Mouratis, Ilias Rossidis, Thanasis Bebis, Ilias Yfantis, Babis Kotridis, Kostas Polychroniou, Giorgos Darivas, Babis Drosos, Antonis Poseidon, Savvas Theodoridis, Kostas Karapatis, Mimis Stefanakos, Thanasis Kinley, Stelios Psychos, Giannis Ioannou, Themis Moustaklis, Vasilis Xanthopoulos, Dimitris Kokkinakis, Giorgos Kansos, Kostas Papazoglou and Aristeidis Papazoglou marked a period of sustained success for Olympiacos in Greek football, which significantly increased the club's popularity throughout Greece. Hence, after the club's success in the 1950s, the club gained unequivocally the nickname of Thrylos, meaning "The Legend".

On 13 September 1959, Olympiacos made its debut in Europe against Milan for the 1959–60 European Cup and became the first Greek club that ever played in the European competitions. The first leg was held at the Karaiskakis Stadium in Piraeus and Olympiacos took the lead with a goal by Kostas Papazoglou (1–0), which was the first goal ever scored by a Greek club (and by a Greek player as well) in the European competitions. Milan's prolific goalscorer José Altafini equalised the match with a header in the 33rd minute, after a cross by Giancarlo Danova. Ilias Yfantis scored an outstanding goal and gave Olympiacos the lead again in the 45th minute of the game, when he controlled the ball between Cesare Maldini and Vincenzo Occhetta and unleashed a powerful volley, burying the ball into the back of the net (2–1). Altafini scored his second goal once again with a header (72nd minute), after a free-kick by Nils Liedholm. The match ended 2–2, with Olympiacos putting in a great performance against the Italian champions, despite the fact that they had no foreign players in their roster, while Milan had four world-class foreign players, such as Altafini, Liedholm, Juan Alberto Schiaffino and Ernesto Grillo. In the second leg Milan won 3–1 (Giancarlo Danova 12', 26', 85'–Ilias Yfantis 68') and qualified for the next round, despite Olympiacos' good performance especially in the second half.

=== First international success and Márton Bukovi era (1960–1972) ===
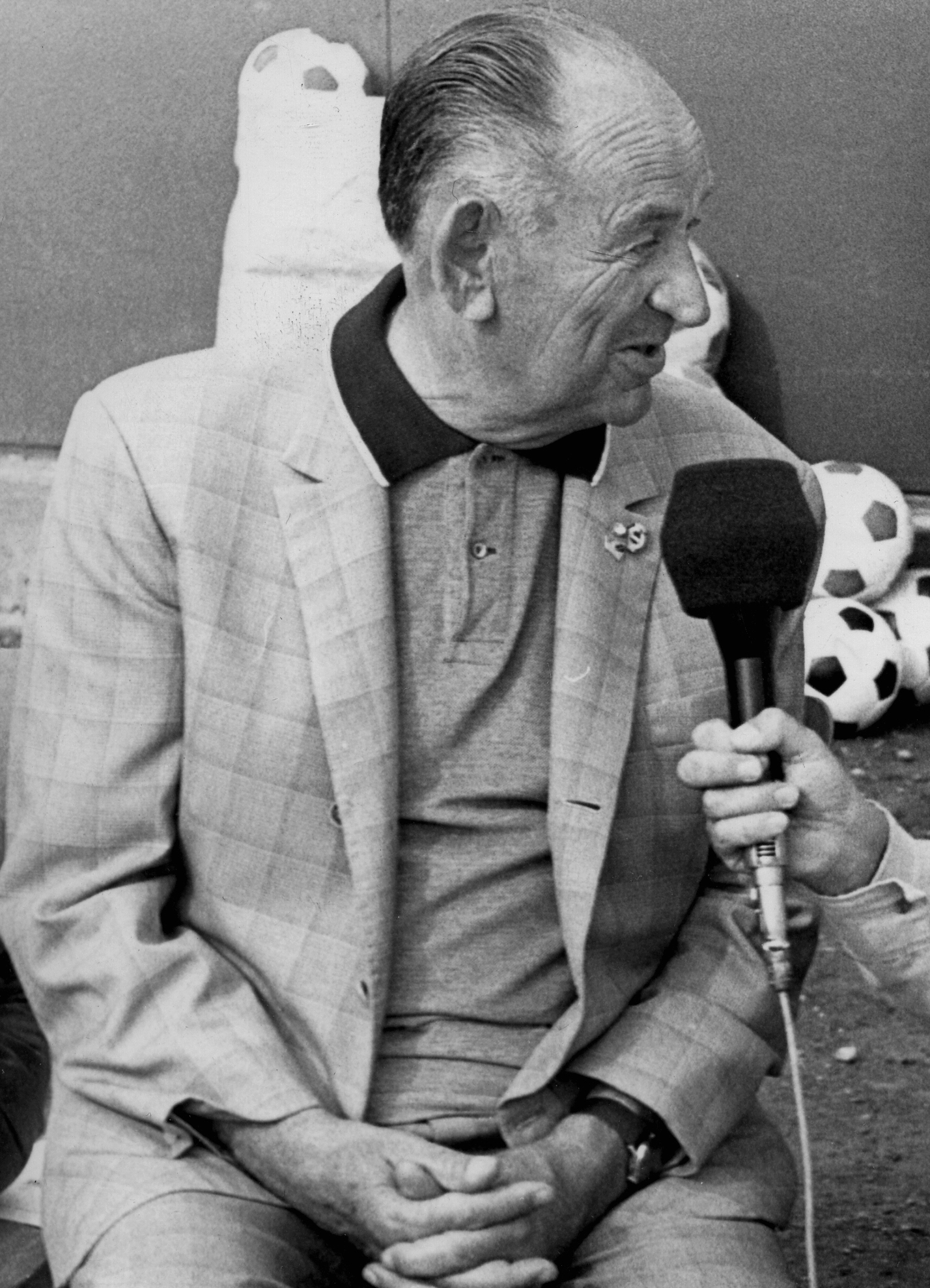
Márton Bukovi coached Olympiacos to two consecutive Greek League titles (1965–66, 1966–67)

Olympiacos entered the 1960s by winning the 1960 and 1961 Greek Cups, thus completing five consecutive Greek Cup wins, which is an all-time record in Greek football history. In this decade, a strong side was created with players from the late 1950s and new important players, such as Giannis Gaitatzis, Nikos Gioutsos, Pavlos Vasileiou, Vasilis Botinos, Giannis Fronimidis, Christos Zanteroglou, Grigoris Aganian, Stathis Tsanaktsis, Mimis Plessas, Giangos Simantiris, Pavlos Grigoriadis, Savvas Papazoglou, Stelios Besis, Sotiris Gavetsos, Tasos Sourounis, Vangelis Milisis, Orestis Pavlidis, Panagiotis Barbalias and last but not least the prolific goalscorer Giorgos Sideris, top-scorer in the club's history with 493 goals in 519 matches in all competitions (224 goals in 284 Greek Championship matches).

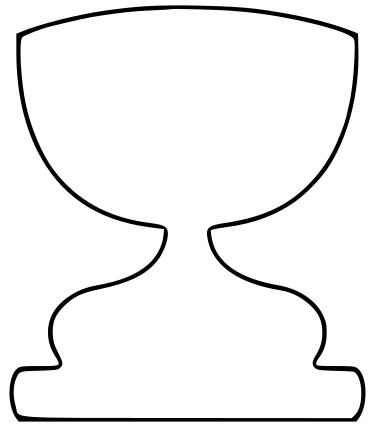
The Balkans Cup Trophy won by Olympiacos in 1963

In 1963, Olympiacos became the first ever Greek club to win a non-domestic competition, winning the Balkans Cup, which marked the first international success by any Greek football club. The Balkans Cup was a very popular international competition in the 1960s (the 1967 final attracted 42.000 spectators), being the second most important international club competition for clubs from the Balkans (after the European Champions' Cup). Olympiacos topped his group after some notable wins, beating Galatasaray 1–0 at the Karaiskakis Stadium (Stelios Psychos 49'), as well as FK Sarajevo (3–2) and FC Brașov (1–0), bagging also two away draws against Galatasaray (1–1) in Mithatpaşa Stadium (Metin Oktay 78' – Aristeidis Papazoglou 6') and FK Sarajevo in Koševo Stadium (3–3). In the final, they faced Levski Sofia, winning the first match in Piraeus (1–0, Giorgos Sideris 37') and losing the second match in Vasil Levski Stadium with the same score. In the third decisive final in Istanbul (a neutral ground), Olympiacos beat Levski 1–0 in Mithatpaşa Stadium with a goal by Mimis Stefanakos in the 87th minute and won the Balkans Cup. The club went on to win the 1963 and 1965 Greek Cups, completing seven Greek Cup titles in nine years. However, the years 1959–1965 were not fruitful for Olympiacos in the Greek Championship, as the team was not able to win the title for six years. This mediocre performance led Olympiacos board to hire the legendary Márton Bukovi as the club's manager, with Mihály Lantos (prominent member of the Hungary national team of the 1950s widely known as the "Mighty Magyars" or "Aranycsapat") as his assistant manager. The innovative Hungarian manager, pioneer of the 4–2–4 formation (along with Béla Guttmann and Gusztáv Sebes) was a solid tactician and favoured attacking football and very demanding training sessions. Bukovi's innovatory tactics and groundbreaking training methods transformed Olympiacos and created a powerful, attacking team with constant player movement and solid combination game. Under Bukovi's guidance and with the great performance of key players such as Giorgos Sideris, Nikos Gioutsos, Kostas Polychroniou, Vasilis Botinos, Aristeidis Papazoglou, Pavlos Vasileiou, Giannis Gaitatzis, Christos Zanteroglou, Grigoris Aganian, Mimis Plessas, Giannis Fronimidis and Orestis Pavlidis, Olympiacos won 2 straight Greek Championships (1966, 1967). They won the 1966 title with 23 wins and 4 draws in 30 games and in the decisive away match against Trikala, an estimated 15,000 ecstatic Olympiacos fans swarmed into the city of Trikala to celebrate the win (0–5) and the Championship title after seven years.

The next season 1966–67, Olympiacos won 12 out of the first 14 games in the league, which was an all-time record in Greek football history, which lasted for 46 years and up until 2013, when Olympiacos, under the manager Míchel's guidance, broke his own record by winning 13 out of the 14 first matches of the 2013–14 season. They won the title in a convincing way and with some notable wins, like the 4–0 smashing victory against arch-rivals Panathinaikos at the Karaiskakis Stadium (Vasileiou 17', Sideris 20', 35', 62'), where Olympiacos dominated and missed several chances to score more goals. Bukovi became a legend for the club's fans and his creation, the Olympiacos team of 1965–67, became nothing short of legendary. A special anthem was written for Bukovi's Olympiacos and became popular throughout Greece: "Του Μπούκοβι την ομαδάρα, τη λένε Ολυμπιακάρα" ("Bukovi's mighty team is called Olympiacos").

Shortly before the end of the 1966–67 season, a military coup d'état took place and the Colonels seized power in Greece, establishing a dictatorship. The regime of the Colonels had devastating consequences for Olympiacos. In December 1967, Giorgos Andrianopoulos, club legend and president of the club for 13 years (1954–1967) was forced out of the club's presidency by the military regime. Furthermore, the regime cancelled the transfer of Giorgos Koudas to Olympiacos and days later another blow was delivered to the club: Márton Bukovi, already a legend and architect of the great 1965–67 team, was forced out of Greece by the military junta, being labelled a communist. He left Greece on 21 December 1967, along with Mihály Lantos.

=== Goulandris era (1972–1975) ===
Another chapter began in 1972, after Nikos Goulandris became president of the club. He reinstated all the prominent members of Olympiacos board that had been forced out by the military regime (including Giorgos Andrianopoulos) and opened-up the member election process, establishing a new, trustworthy board of directors. He appointed Lakis Petropoulos as manager and signed top-class players, creating a great roster with key performers such as Giorgos Delikaris, Yves Triantafyllos, Julio Losada, Milton Viera, Panagiotis Kelesidis, Michalis Kritikopoulos, Takis Synetopoulos, Romain Argyroudis, Maik Galakos, Nikos Gioutsos, Giannis Gaitatzis, Vasilis Siokos, Thanasis Angelis, Lakis Glezos, Petros Karavitis, Kostas Davourlis, Giannis Kyrastas, Dimitris Persidis, Lefteris Poupakis and Babis Stavropoulos. Under Goulandris' presidency, Olympiacos won the Greek Championship three times in a row (1972–73, 1973–74, 1974–75), combining it with the Greek Cup in 1973 (beating PAOK 1–0 in the final) and 1975 (beating Panathinaikos 1–0 in the final) to celebrate two Doubles in three years. Ιn the 1972–73 season, Olympiacos won the title by conceding only 13 goals in 34 matches, which is an-all-time record in Greek football history. The team's best year though, was undoubtedly the 1973–74 season, when Olympiacos won the league with 26 wins and 7 draws in 34 games, scoring an all-time record of 102 goals and conceding only 14.

In European competitions, they managed to eliminate Cagliari in the 1972–73 UEFA Cup, a major force in Italian football during the late 1960s and the early 1970s, (1970 Serie A Champions, 1972 Serie A title contenders), with world-class Italian international players like Gigi Riva, Angelo Domenghini, Enrico Albertosi, Pierluigi Cera, Sergio Gori and Fabrizio Poletti. Olympiacos managed to beat Cagliari twice, 2–1 in Piraeus and 1–0 in Cagliari, becoming the first ever Greek football club to win on Italian soil. In the next round they faced the competition's defending champions Tottenham Hotspur, who were undefeated for 16-straight games in all European competitions. Olympiacos did not manage to qualify against Spurs, but they managed to get a 1–0 win in Piraeus, which ended Tottenham's undefeated streak and marked the first ever victory of a Greek football club against an English side. Two years later, Olympiacos entered the 1974–75 European Cup and they were drawn to face Kenny Dalglish's Celtic, one of the strongest teams in European football at that time and semi-finalists of the previous season. The first leg was played in Celtic Park, where Celtic had never been defeated, running an undefeated streak of 36 straight home games in all European competitions (27 wins, 9 draws) from 1962 to 1974. Olympiacos took the lead through Milton Viera's strike in the 36th minute, with Celtic equalising late in the game. The away draw gave Olympiacos the advantage and they finished the job in Piraeus, after a spectacular 2–0 win against the Scottish Champions with Kritikopoulos and Stavropoulos finding the net. In the next round, they were drawn to play against Anderlecht for a place in the quarter-finals of the competition. Anderlecht won the first leg with 5–1 and Olympiacos' task seemed impossible. In the second leg in Greece, however, Olympiacos put on a dominant display and almost reached a winning score in a match that was marked by referee Károly Palotai's decisions. Olympiacos beat Anderlecht 3–0, while Palotai disallowed four Olympiacos goals and did not give at least three clear penalties committed by Anderlecht players, while Stavropoulos was shown a red card for no good reason. The match is widely known in Greece as the "Palotai massacre" with Olympiacos coming close to one of the biggest comebacks in European Cup history.

=== Domination in the early 1980s, four consecutive League titles (1975–1987) ===
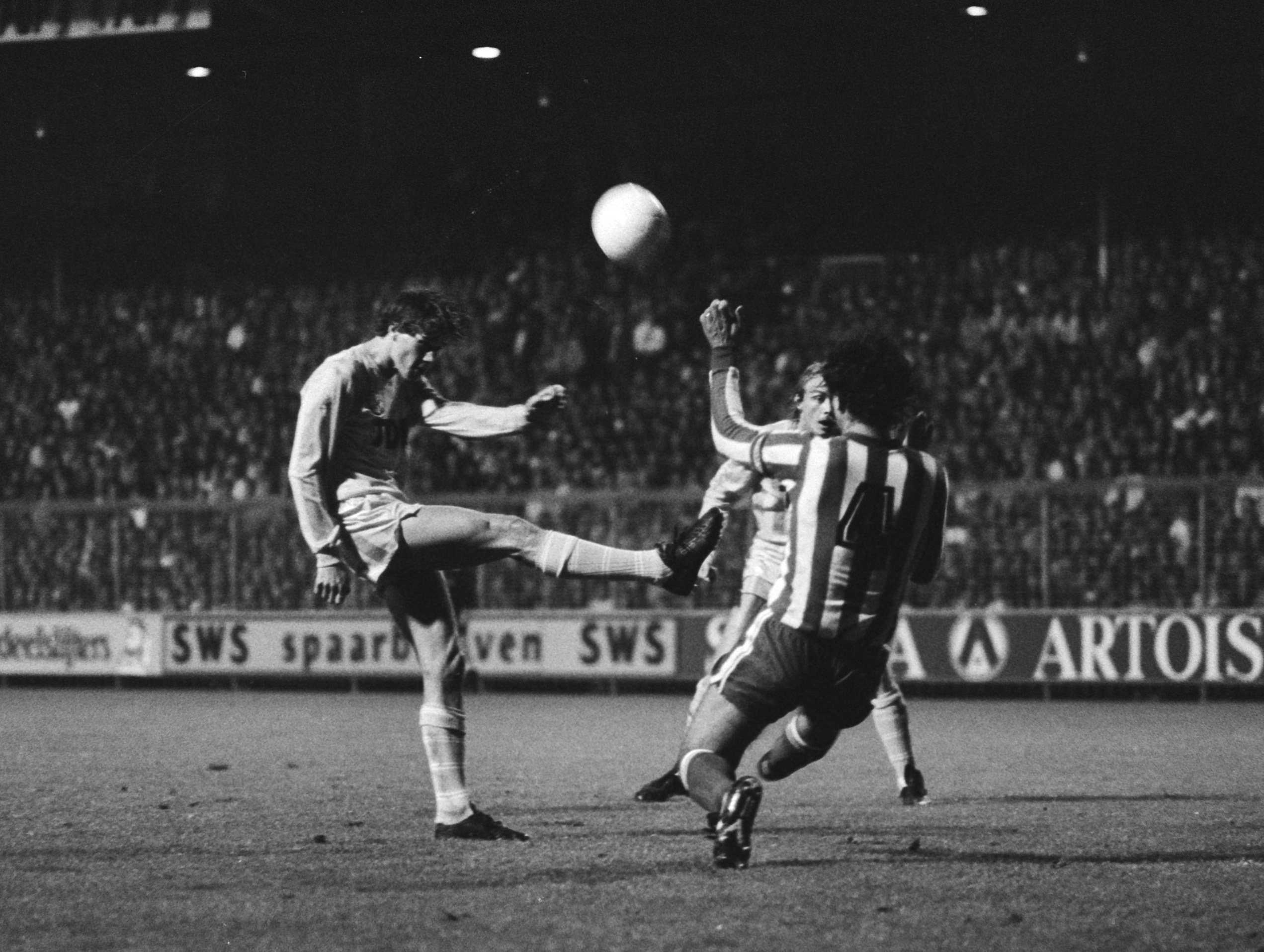
Ajax's Marco Van Basten against Olympiacos' Stavros Papadopoulos in De Meer Stadion for the 1983–84 European Cup (0–0).

Following Goulandris resignation from the presidency in 1975, the team went through a relative dry spell in the second half of the 1970s. However, in the summer of 1979, the Greek championship turned professional and Stavros Daifas became owner and president of the club. Olympiacos emerged again as the dominant force in Greek football, winning the title four times in a row (1979–80, 1980–81, 1981–82, 1982–83) with players like the relentless goalscorer Nikos Anastopoulos, Martin Novoselac, Vicente Estavillo, Thomas Ahlström, Roger Albertsen, Maik Galakos, Tasos Mitropoulos, Takis Nikoloudis, Nikos Sarganis, Nikos Vamvakoulas, Giorgos Kokolakis, Vangelis Kousoulakis, Petros Michos, Takis Lemonis, Christos Arvanitis, Petros Xanthopoulos, Stavros Papadopoulos, Meletis Persias, Giorgos Togias and Kostas Orfanos.

Kazimierz Górski, the iconic Polish manager, led Olympiacos to the 1980, 1981 and 1983 titles (winning also the Double in 1981, the 9th Double in Olympiacos' history) while Alketas Panagoulias, who had also been manager of the Greece national football team and the United States national team as well, led the team to the 1982 title after a memorable 2–1 win (Estavillo 6', Anastopoulos 69') against arch-rivals Panathinaikos in the crucial Championship final match in Volos. With Panagoulias as manager, Olympiacos won the 1986–87 title as well, having a solid roster with players from the early 1980s like Anastopoulos, Mitropoulos, Michos, Xanthopoulos and other strong players like Miloš Šestić, Giorgos Vaitsis, Jorge Barrios, Andreas Bonovas, Alexis Alexiou and Vasilis Papachristou.

=== The Stone Years, UEFA Cup quarter-finalists (1987–1996) ===
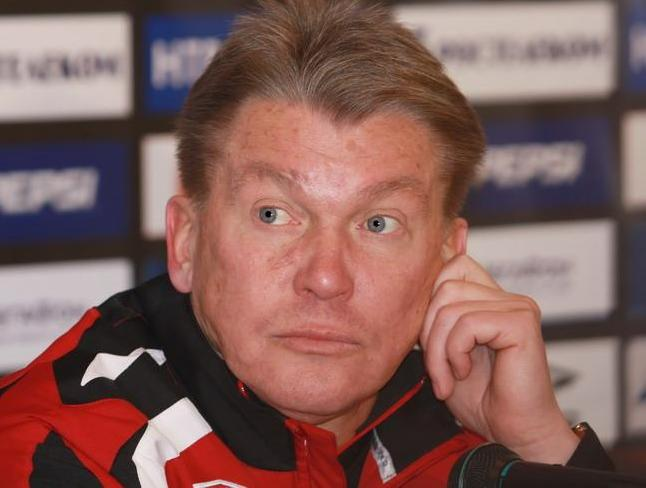
Oleg Blokhin

Olympiacos experienced its darkest days from the late-1980s until the mid-'90s. In the mid-'80s, Olympiacos came into the hands of Greek businessman George Koskotas who was soon accused of and convicted for embezzlement, leaving Olympiacos deep in debt. The club went through a period of administrative turbulence until 1993, when Sokratis Kokkalis became majority shareholder and president of the club. As soon as he took the club's presidency, Kokkalis agreed to a settlement to pay off all the club's debts and started reorganising and restructuring the club. On the pitch, the team, with all the financial and managerial problems, as well as the lack of strong administrative leadership until the Kokkalis arrival, spent nine seasons without a league title, from 1988 to 1996, despite the foreign top-class players that played for the club at that period, such as Lajos Détári, Oleh Protasov, Juan Gilberto Funes, Bent Christensen, Hennadiy Lytovchenko, Yuri Savichev, Andrzej Juskowiak, Daniel Batista, Fabián Estay and the backbone of solid Greek players like Vassilis Karapialis, Kiriakos Karataidis, Giotis Tsalouchidis, Nikos Tsiantakis, Giorgos Vaitsis, Minas Hantzidis, Theodoros Pachatouridis, Savvas Kofidis, Chris Kalantzis, Georgios Mitsibonas, Ilias Talikriadis, Alekos Rantos, Panagiotis Sofianopoulos, Ilias Savvidis and Michalis Vlachos. This period is called "Olympiacos' stone years". Nevertheless, the club brought home the 1990 (beating OFI by 4–2 in the final) and 1992 Greek Cups (beating PAOK 2–0 in the second leg of the double final in Piraeus), as well as the 1992 Greek Super Cup, beating AEK 3–1 in the final. In addition, the team, under the guidance of the legendary Ukrainian manager Oleg Blokhin, managed to reach the quarter-finals of the 1992–93 UEFA Cup Winners' Cup, eliminating Arsène Wenger's Monaco, after a hard-fought 1–0 away win in Stade Louis II with a late goal by Giorgos Vaitsis and a goalless draw at Karaiskakis Stadium in the second leg. They did not manage to qualify for the semi-finals, however, as they were eliminated by Atlético Madrid (1–1 draw at home, 3–1 loss in Madrid).

=== The Golden Era (1996–2010) ===
==== Seven consecutive League titles, near-miss to UEFA Champions League semi-finals (1996–2003) ====
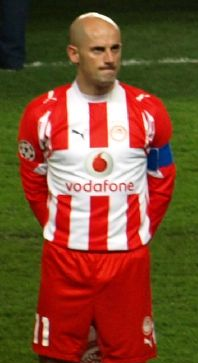
Predrag Đorđević won a record 12 Greek League titles with Olympiacos and is the club's record foreign goalscorer with 158 goals in 493 official matches

In 1996, Sokratis Kokkalis appointed Dušan Bajević as the team's manager. By that time, Olympiacos had already a very strong roster, with players like Kyriakos Karataidis, Vassilis Karapialis, Grigoris Georgatos, Alexis Alexandris, Giorgos Amanatidis, Nikos Dabizas and Ilija Ivić. Upon Bajević's arrival, Kokkalis opted to strengthen the team significantly in order to create a very strong roster that would dominate Greek football for years to come. He purchased the highly rated prospects Predrag Đorđević and Stelios Giannakopoulos from Paniliakos, outbidding both AEK Athens and Panathinaikos; signed Refik Šabanadžović, Andreas Niniadis, Giorgos Anatolakis and Alekos Kaklamanos; and brought Olympiacos Academy product Dimitris Eleftheropoulos back from his loan spell at Proodeftiki. With all these players up front, Olympiacos strode to the 1996–97 title by 12 clear points over AEK and 20 points over the third Panathinaikos in Bajević's first season in charge; this was the club's first Greek Championship in nine seasons, putting an end to the "stone years" and officially beginning Olympiacos' era of domination. In the next season, 1997–98, Dimitris Mavrogenidis, Siniša Gogić, Ilias Poursanidis and the Ghanaian striker Peter Ofori-Quaye were transferred to the club and Olympiacos won the 1997–98 Championship. Bajević's team, along with AEK and Panathinaikos, were closely separated in the table, but finally Olympiacos made an important away win against Panathinaikos (0–2) and celebrated the second consecutive Championship, with three points difference from Panathinaikos. Olympiacos participated for the first time in the UEFA Champions League group stage and took third place in a tough group, leaving Porto in fourth place, while Real Madrid, the eventual champions, topped the group and qualified for the quarter-finals.

The 1998–99 season was undoubtedly one of the best seasons in Olympiacos history. They won the 1998–99 Greek Championship quite convincingly, with ten points difference from AEK and 11 from third-placed Panathinaikos, and also celebrated the domestic double, bringing home the 1998–99 Greek Cup after a convincing 2–0 win against arch-rivals Panathinaikos in the final (Mavrogenidis 54', Ofori-Quaye 90'), despite the fact that they played for more than 60 minutes in the game with only ten players. In European competitions, they entered the 1998–99 UEFA Champions League group stage, being drawn in a group with Ajax, Porto and Croatia Zagreb. They won the group and qualified to the quarter-finals, gathering 11 points with 3 home wins against Ajax (1–0), Porto (2–1) and Croatia Zagreb (2–0) and two away draws in Porto (2–2) and Zagreb (1–1). In the quarter-finals of the competition, they faced Juventus, with the first leg in Turin. Juventus took a 2–0 lead, but Olympiacos scored a crucial away goal in the 90th minute of the game with a penalty by Andreas Niniadis, a goal that caused the 10.000 Olympiacos fans who travelled to Italy to erupt into joyous ecstasy. In the second leg in Athens, Olympiacos totally dominated the match, and scored the goal that put them in the driving seat in the 12th minute of the game, when Siniša Gogić's powerful header found the back of the net after Grigoris Georgatos's superb cross. They also missed an outstanding chance to double the lead, when Giorgos Amanatidis' powerful header from short distance was saved by Michelangelo Rampulla. Olympiacos kept the ticket to the semi-finals in his hands until the 85th minute, when Juventus, who hadn't produced any chances in the game, equalised the score after a crucial mistake by Dimitris Eleftheropoulos, who had been the team's hero in all the previous games. Despite the big disappointment from the way the qualification to the semi-finals was lost, the presence of the team in the Champions League quarter-finals, one of their best European campaigns, combined with the domestic double, marked a very successful season for the club, arguably the best in their long history.

The next four seasons (1999–2000, 2000–01, 2001–02, 2002–03) Olympiacos signed world-class players of great magnitude such as Giovanni, Zlatko Zahovič and the World champion Christian Karembeu, as well as other top-class players including Pär Zetterberg, Zé Elias, Nery Castillo, Christos Patsatzoglou, Lampros Choutos and Stelios Venetidis. These transfers strengthened even more the already strong roster from the previous successful years and under the guidance of managers like Ioannis Matzourakis, Takis Lemonis and Oleg Protasov (Bajević had left the club in 1999), Olympiacos managed to win seven consecutive Greek Championships (1996–97–2002–03), breaking their own past record of six (1954–1959). Olympiacos won their seventh consecutive title after a dramatic conclusion to the 2002–03 Greek League: Olympiacos was hosting arch-rivals Panathinaikos in matchday 29, who led the table with a three-point difference. Olympiacos needed to win the derby by two clear goals in order to overthrow their rivals in the championship race. Olympiacos beat Panathinaikos 3–0 (Giovanni 3', Giannakopoulos 15' 48') in a dominant display in Rizoupoli and celebrated the all-time record of seven straight Championships, which was a dream and a historic objective for the club and especially for the fans.

==== Five consecutive League titles, Two presences in UEFA Champions League knockout phase (2004–2010) ====
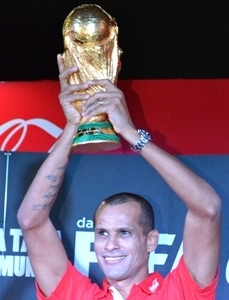
Rivaldo

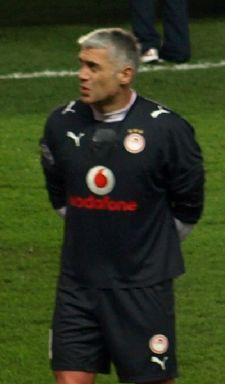
Antonis Nikopolidis

In 2004, Olympiacos rehired Dušan Bajević and signed the 1999 World Footballer of the Year and 2002 World Champion Brazilian superstar Rivaldo and the 2004 European champion Antonios Nikopolidis. The end of the season found Olympiacos winning the domestic double and having a decent Champions League display, gathering ten points in a tough group alongside Liverpool, Monaco and Deportivo de La Coruña and losing the qualification to the knockout phase in the last four minutes of the last game against the eventual European champions Liverpool at Anfield. Bajević left the club and the Norwegian manager Trond Sollied was hired in his place. They club signed Cypriot striker Michalis Konstantinou from Panathinaikos, 2004 European champion defender Michalis Kapsis from Bordeaux and the versatile box-to-box Ivorian midfielder Yaya Touré. During the 2005–06 season, Olympiacos won all the four derbies against their major rivals, Panathinaikos and AEK Athens, something only achieved once more, during the season 1972–73. The combined goal total in these four matches was 11–3 in favour of Olympiacos. They also beat AEK Athens 3–0 in the Greek Cup Final to clinch their second-straight double and managed to win an all-time record of 16 consecutive matches in the championship, breaking their own past record.

After a record-breaking season, in the 2006 summer transfers, Trond Sollied signed Michał Żewłakow, Júlio César and Tomislav Butina among others. However, he did not live up to expectations in the 2006–07 Champions League and was replaced by Takis Lemonis at the end of 2006. Lemonis transferred the young star Vasilis Torosidis, and led Olympiacos in their third consecutive championship, but failed to win the Greek Cup after a surprise elimination by PAS Giannina.

In the summer of 2007, Olympiacos made very expensive transfers like Luciano Galletti, Darko Kovačević, Raúl Bravo, Lomana LuaLua, Cristian Ledesma and Leonel Núñez. They also brought back the solid Greek defender Paraskevas Antzas and signed the very talented young striker Kostas Mitroglou from Borussia Mönchengladbach. Furthermore, they accomplished the most lucrative sale in Greek football history after selling striker-midfielder Nery Castillo to Ukrainian club Shakhtar Donetsk for the record sum of €20 million ($27.5M). Because of a clause in Castillo's contract, Olympiacos received €15 million, with the remaining €5 million given directly to the player. Furthermore, a controversy started between the team and Rivaldo, as Olympiacos did not wish to renew the player's contract despite the fact that Rivaldo had featured heavily in the club's successful campaigns, both in Greece and abroad. Former player Ilija Ivić was selected for the role of the team's football director. The team did not start well in the Greek championship, but it performed well in the Champions League, qualifying for the last 16 as they finished second in their group, level on 11 points with group winners Real Madrid, eliminating Werder Bremen and Lazio. However, the team's less than satisfactory performance in the league, coupled with the defeat from Chelsea in Stamford Bridge for the knockout phase, prompted club owner Sokratis Kokkalis to sack manager Takis Lemonis. The team's assistant manager, José Segura, coached the team for the remainder of the season. Olympiacos managed to win both the Greek Championship and Cup, but Segura left the club at the end of the season.

In the summer of 2008, Olympiacos made prominent transfers, signing Dudu Cearense, Avraam Papadopoulos, Diogo Luis Santo and Matt Derbyshire and appointed Ernesto Valverde as the new manager with a three-year contract worth approximately €6 million. The 2008–09 season started badly for Olympiacos, with the team losing their first few official matches, against Anorthosis Famagusta for the Champions League third qualifying round, and was eliminated from the tournament, which resulted to a seat in the UEFA Cup first round, where Olympiacos beat Nordsjælland to qualify for the group stage. The team also started well in the 2008–09 Super League Greece, winning every match at home, but facing difficulties away. They ended up winning the Greek Championship and the Greek Cup, celebrating the 14th double in Olympiacos history. After an impressive UEFA Cup run at home, with some spectacular wins against Benfica (5–1) and Hertha BSC (4–0), the team managed to get through to the round of 32, facing French side Saint-Étienne.

In the summer of 2009, Olympiacos signed major players, such as Olof Mellberg from Juventus for €2.5 million, midfielder Jaouad Zairi from Asteras Tripolis and Enzo Maresca from Sevilla. Many other players returned from loan spells, such as former Real Madrid defender Raúl Bravo, Georgios Katsikogiannis and midfielder Cristian Ledesma. Olympiacos appointed former Brazil legend Zico as their manager and started the 2009–10 season with great success, as they qualified for the Champions League final 16, finishing second in Group H only 3 points behind Arsenal, despite the absence of numerous first-team players due to injuries. They faced Bordeaux in the final 16 and lost the first match at home (0–1). In the second match, despite Bordeaux's early lead, Olympiacos levelled the match and missed some great chances to score a second goal, before eventually losing in the dying moments of the match (1–2). Domestically, Olympiacos secured a 2–0 derby win over arch-rivals Panathinaikos, with striker Kostas Mitroglou scoring twice. However, this was only a highlight in an otherwise below-par season for the club, as they not only lost the championship to Panathinaikos, but were also defeated in four out of their six playoff games, eventually finishing last, in the 5th position of the league table; this result marked the team's worst ranking since being placed 8th in 1988, and meant that the club would start their Europa League campaign from the second qualifying round the following season.

=== New presidency, seven consecutive League titles and European ascent (2010–2017) ===
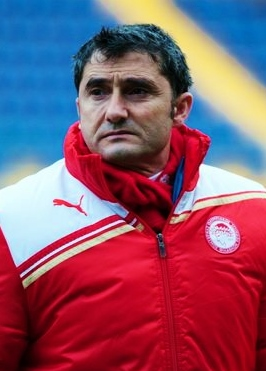
Ernesto Valverde

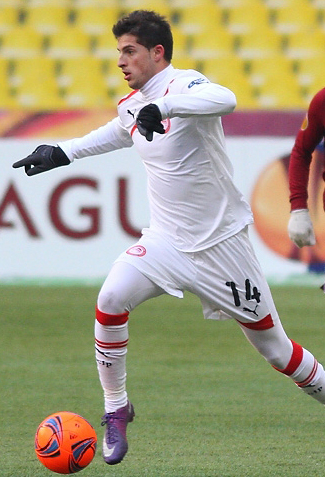
Kevin Mirallas

In 2010, Evangelos Marinakis, a successful shipping magnate, bought the team from Sokratis Kokkalis. During the first year of his presidency, Marinakis appointed fans' favourite Ernesto Valverde as manager (who came back for a second tenure in the club) and signed players with international pedigree, such as Albert Riera, Ariel Ibagaza, Kevin Mirallas, Marko Pantelić and François Modesto. As a result, Olympiacos won the Greek title for the 38th time in its history, 13 points ahead of second-placed Panathinaikos.

In the 2011–12 season, the team's roster was strengthened with players like Jean Makoun, Pablo Orbaiz, Iván Marcano, Rafik Djebbour and Djamel Abdoun and with Ernesto Valverde as their manager for the second straight season, Olympiacos had a very successful campaign both domestically and internationally. They won both the Greek league and the Greek Cup to complete the 15th domestic double in the club's history. In European competitions, Olympiacos had a solid Champions League campaign, having been drawn in Group F against Arsenal, Borussia Dortmund and Marseille. Despite delivering nine points in the group, with two emphatic wins against Arsenal and Dortmund at home (both with a 3–1 scoreline) and an away win against Marseille (0–1), they lost the qualification to the knock-out stage after Marseille's controversial 2–3 away win in Dortmund in game 6, with Marseille scoring two goals in the last five minutes of the match to come back from an early 2–0 Dortmund lead. Olympiacos continued in Europa League where he was drawn to play against Rubin Kazan. The Greek champions eliminated the Russian side with two wins (1–0 in both Kazan and Piraeus) and were up to play against Metalist Kharkiv in the Last 16 of the competition. They won the first match in Ukraine with David Fuster scoring the winning goal (0–1) but in the second match, despite their early lead and the plethora of missed chances (they hit the woodwork twice in the first half), they conceded two goals in the last nine minutes of the game and lost the qualification to the quarter-finals.

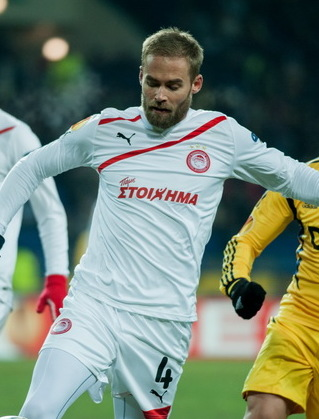
Olof Mellberg

At the end of the season, Ernesto Valverde announced his decision to return to Spain, thus ending his second successful spell at Olympiacos. The club announced the Portuguese Leonardo Jardim as their new manager. The team performed very well in the Greek league and had a decent Champions league campaign, gathering nine points in Group B, after wins against Arsenal (2–1 at home) and Montpellier (1–2 in Montpellier, 3–1 in Piraeus). Despite the relatively good results, Leonardo Jardim was replaced by the Spanish manager and Real Madrid legend Míchel. The team went on to celebrate the 16th double in their history by winning their 40th Greek Championship, 15 points ahead the second PAOK, as well as their 26th Greek Cup after a 3–1 win against Asteras Tripolis in the final. The 40th Greek championship title gave Olympiacos the fourth star on top of the club's emblem, which was a major goal for the club and especially for the fans.

The expectations for the 2013–14 season were very high, especially after the signing of players such as striker Javier Saviola, Joel Campbell, Roberto, Alejandro Domínguez, Vladimír Weiss, Delvin N'Dinga and Leandro Salino. Olympiacos had a great season both domestically and internationally. In Europe, they were drawn in Group C of the 2013–14 Champions League alongside Paris Saint-Germain, Benfica and Anderlecht. After a strong performance in the group, Olympiacos finished second with ten points and qualified for the Last 16 at the expense of Benfica (1–0 win in Piraeus, 1–1 draw in Lisbon) and Anderlecht (0–3 win in Brussels, 3–1 win in Piraeus). In the round of 16, they were drawn to play against Manchester United. Olympiacos, after a solid display, won the first leg with a comfortable 2–0 (Alejandro Domínguez 38', Campbell 55'), in a match where they dominated totally and missed chances to even extend the lead. Despite the two-goal advantage which put them within touching distance of a quarter-final place for the first time since 1999, Olympiacos lost 3–0 in the second leg in Old Trafford, having missed a double chance to equalise the score in the 40th minute. The Greek champions pushed on in the last ten minutes to find the crucial away goal, but to no avail. Although the ticket to the quarter-finals slipped out of the club's hands, Olympiacos' overall performance and the fact that the club managed to qualify to the knockout phase (round of 16) of the Champions League for the third time in six years (2007–08, 2009–10, 2013–14), marked a very successful European campaign. Domestically, Olympiacos won their history's 41st Greek Championship very convincingly, 17 points ahead of second-placed PAOK. He also participated in the International Champions Cup 2014 where he won 3rd place.

In the 2014–15 season, Olympiacos entered the 2014–15 Champions League group stage with hopes to repeat the previous year's performance; they were drawn alongside Atlético Madrid, Juventus and Malmö FF. They had a solid performance in the group, managing to beat last year's runners-up Atlético 3–2 and eventual finalists Juventus 1–0 at the Karaiskakis Stadium, but they lost the qualification for the knockout stage in the last game: Olympiacos beat Malmö FF 4–2 at home but at the same time Juventus were drawing against Atlético in Italy, securing the crucial one point they needed to qualify. Had Olympiacos and Juventus finished with the same points, Olympiacos would have qualified due to best aggregate score (away goals) of their two games (1–0 Olympiacos win in Piraeus, 3–2 Juventus win in Turin). The third place in the group gave Olympiacos the ticket for the next round of UEFA Europa League, where they were eliminated by the eventual runners-up Dnipro Dnipropetrovsk. Domestically, the team had a very successful season, winning the 17th double in their history. They won their 42nd Greek Championship with 12 points difference from the second Panathinaikos and their 27th Greek Cup, beating Skoda Xanthi 3–1 in the final.

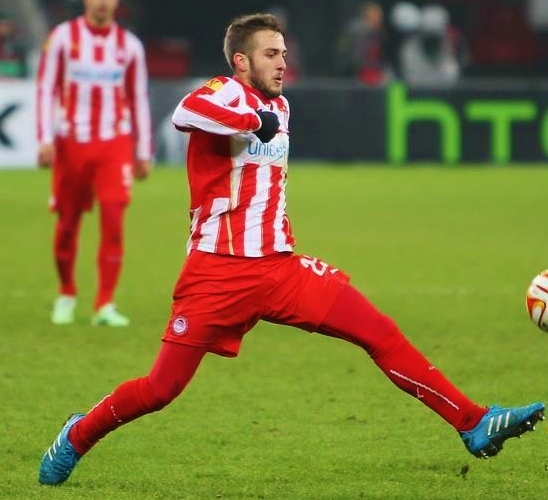
Kostas Fortounis

The 2015–16 season started with a new manager replacement, as Marco Silva took over the management over his fellow countryman Vitor Pereira, while the squad was strengthened with the world-class presence of Esteban Cambiasso and a number of other players with European competition experience, including Kostas Fortounis, Felipe Pardo, Sebá, Manuel Da Costa, Brown Ideye and Alfreð Finnbogason. In a tough Champions League group that included Bayern München, Arsenal and Dinamo Zagreb, Olympiacos managed to record 9 points through a 3–2 away win over the Gunners at the Emirates Stadium, considered by many as one of the club's most important European victories, as well as two more wins against Dinamo (1–0 away and 2–1 at home). Last matchday saw the team face Arsenal at the Karaiskakis stadium, needing a 1–0 or 2–1 defeat to the Gunners, as the worst-case scenario, to advance to the knockout phase of the competition based on the away goals rule; the Red-Whites eventually lost 3–0 and continued their European journey in the UEFA Europa League, where they were eliminated by Anderlecht in the first knockout stage. Despite the above, Olympiacos broke the record for most European competition victories recorded by a Greek club, with 97 over the 96 of second-placed Panathinaikos as of the summer of 2016. Domestically, Olympiacos had perhaps their most successful season in years, as the team managed to secure their 43rd Greek Championship, and 6th consecutive, on the last day of February 2016, considered a national record for the earliest time, within a league campaign, when a title is clinched. The team managed to finish their league campaign with a 30-point difference over their arch rivals Panathinaikos, who came in second. The team's 85 points over the course of 30 matchdays, including a 28–1–1 overall result breakdown with 13 away wins and a perfect 15 victories out of 15 home games, are also considered a national record. However, despite the club's expectations of doing the double, they did not manage to win the Greek Cup as they finished runners-up to rivals AEK Athens after a 2–1 loss in the final.

The 2016–17 season proved to be rather tumultuous for the club, despite the signing of such key players as Óscar Cardozo, Tarik Elyounoussi, Alaixys Romao, Aly Cissokho and Marko Marin. The main issues that arose were the team's shock elimination from Israeli outfit Hapoel Be'er-Sheva, after a 1–0 aggregate defeat, in the third qualifying round of the UEFA Champions League, and the highly frequent change of managers, leading the club to having been coached by five individuals over the same season: Marco Silva, Victor Sánchez (responsible for the elimination from Hapoel), Paulo Bento, Vasilis Vouzas and Takis Lemonis. The team's UEFA Europa League journey was not as successful as other European campaigns, starting with a difficult 3–1 aggregate victory (1–1 before extra time) over Arouca in the playoffs, continuing with the team's qualification from the group stage but only as second-placed to APOEL (in a group that also included Young Boys and Astana), and ending with a heavy 5–2 aggregate defeat to Besiktas in the last 16 of the knockout stage (with goalkeeper Nicola Leali being highly responsible for 4 out of the 5 goals conceded), despite having advanced from the last 32 thanks to a 3–0 aggregate win over Osmanlispor. The frequent manager change negatively affected the team's stability and rhythm in domestic competitions as well. Firstly, Olympiacos failed to qualify for the Greek Cup final after being ousted by AEK Athens, who advanced on the away goals rule after a 2–2 aggregate draw. Secondly, despite the fact that the Reds clinched their 44th Greek Championship, and 7th consecutive for the second time in Greek football history, they only managed to do so with a six-point difference (67 to 61) over PAOK.

=== European successes, three consecutive Greek League titles (2017–2023) ===
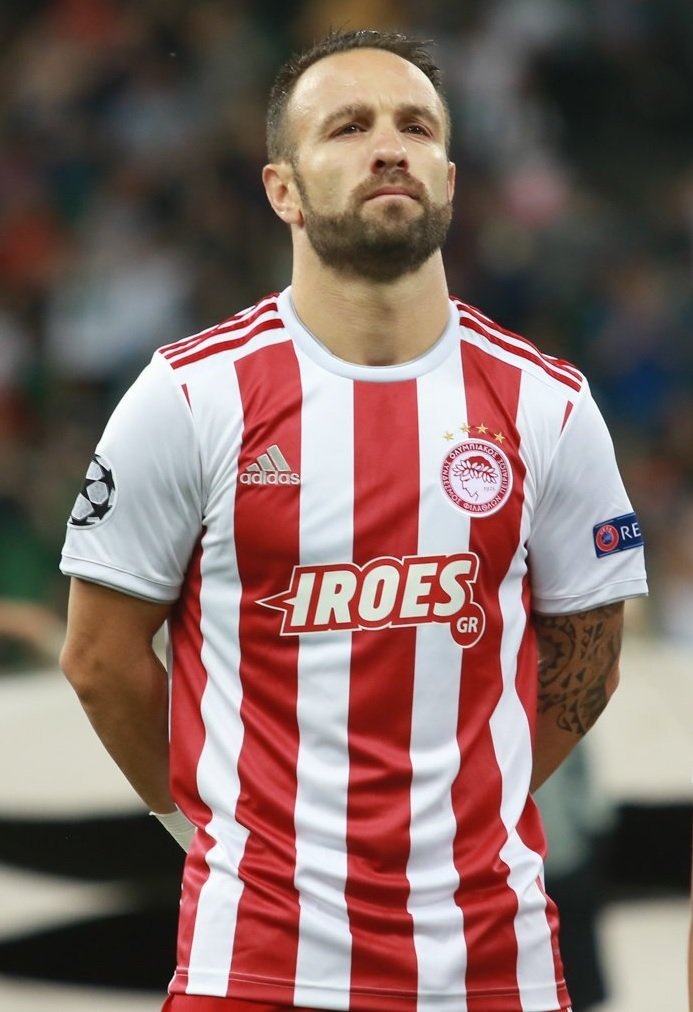
Mathieu Valbuena

At the start of the 2017–18 season, the board decided to hire former Anderlecht manager Besnik Hasi to guide Olympiacos back to the UEFA Champions League group stage after a year's absence. Upon his arrival, Hasi strengthened the squad with players as Vadis Odjidja-Ofoe, Guillaume Gillet, Mehdi Carcela, Jagoš Vuković, Björn Engels, Uroš Đurđević, Emmanuel Emenike and Panagiotis Tachtsidis.

Aggregate victories over Partizan (5–3) and Rijeka (3–1) in the two final qualifying rounds ensured the Red-Whites' presence in Group D of the competition, considered perhaps the toughest in Olympiacos' European history due to Barcelona, Juventus and Sporting CP being the opponents. A disheartening 2–3 defeat in the hands of Sporting at Thrylos' European season opener, combined with a 3–2 loss to AEK despite being 0–2 up, led to Hasi's dismissal from the club and his replacement by Takis Lemonis. The latter decided to focus on getting the squad back on track in domestic competitions, at a time when Olympiacos eventually got eliminated from Europe ahead of the Christmas break for the first time in 12 years. Following a home goalless draw against Barcelona and five defeats, the Red-Whites only managed to acquire one point during their entire Champions League group stage campaign, something considered a setback for the club after their 7 previous UEFA Champions League campaigns (2007–08, 2009–10, 2011–12, 2012–13, 2013–14, 2014–15, 2015–16), in which they gathered at least 9 points in all of the groups (11 points in 2007–08, 10 points in 2009–10, 9 points in 2011–12, 9 points in 2012–13, 10 points in 2013–14, 9 points in 2014–15 and 9 points in 2015–16), with three qualifications to the knockout stage (Last 16) of the competition. Despite being in the Super League lead halfway through the season, Lemonis was dismissed on grounds of dressing room instability, and Óscar García was subsequently appointed with a vision of increasing attacking efficiency and discipline. Domestically, Olympiacos' Greek Cup run ended in the quarter-finals, marking their third consecutive year that they failed to lift the Cup. In the Super League the Red-Whites conceded the title to AEK three matchdays before completion, thus ending a run of seven consecutive championship wins and leading to the dismissal of García after two months at the club's helm, with Christos Kontis finishing the season as caretaker manager. Portuguese Pedro Martins was appointed manager in order to lead Olympiacos at the following 2018–19 season.

In the 2018–19 season, the Reds tried to recover from their disastrous last season. Starting with consecutive qualifications over Swiss side FC Luzern (agg: 7–1) as well as English side Burnley (agg: 4–2), the club earned a spot at the Europa League group stages, in which they faced Italian giants AC Milan, Spanish side Real Betis as well as F91 Dudelange. Having 2 wins, 1 draw and 2 losses, Thrylos needed a 2-goal or more victory against Milan in the last match to advance to the Round of 32, which they eventually earned with a 81st-minute penalty by Kostas Fortounis, eliminating the Rossoneri. The 2018–19 campaign eventually came to an end by Dynamo Kyiv in the Round of 32, with a 2–2 draw in Piraeus, followed by a 1–0 defeat in Kyiv. Domestically, despite having a way better season compared to 2017–18, the Red-Whites fell short champions PAOK, finishing just 5 points behind, while also suffering from a shock elimination to Lamia in the cup, ending the season trophyless for the second year in a row.

Despite his failure on a domestic level, Pedro Martins kept his position as manager of the team, who, having kept key players from last season, such as Daniel Podence, Guilherme and Mady Camara as well as strengthening the squad with Mathieu Valbuena, Youssef El-Arabi and Rúben Semedo, led the club to one of its greatest seasons in the past decade. Starting at Champions League 2nd qualifying round, Olympiacos defeated emphatically Viktoria Plzeň (agg: 4–0), İstanbul Başakşehir (agg: 3–0) and FC Krasnodar (agg: 6–1), comfortably securing their return in the group stage and becoming the only Greek club to achieve 3 successive qualifications to the group stage of the competition. Having been drawn to eventual winners Bayern Munich, London side Tottenham Hotspur and Red Star Belgrade, the Reds got a hard-fought point at their first game against Spurs at Karaiskakis, despite being down 0–2 in the 30th minute, with goals by Daniel Podence and Mathieu Valbuena on 44th and 54th minute respectively. They then went on to lose their 3 next fixtures, needing a win in Tottenham Hotspur Stadium to keep qualification dreams alive. Despite being 2–0 up, a crucial mistake by Yassine Meriah in the dying seconds of the first half gave Spurs the motivation to eventually win 4–2. Olympiacos then won their last game against Crvena Zvezda at home thanks to a late El Arabi penalty, to continue in the Europa League. In the Round of 32, Thrylos got one of their brightest moments in their history, as they managed to eliminate their European rivals Arsenal on away goals (agg: 2–2), with a late El Arabi goal in the last minute of extra time in Emirates stadium, advancing to the last 16, where they faced Wolves. After a 1–1 draw in Piraeus without their fans, the competition stopped due to the COVID-19 pandemic, eventually resuming in August 2020, where Olympiacos' campaign stopped after a 1–0 defeat in Molineux Stadium with many controversial decisions by referee Szymon Marciniak. Domestically, the Reds won their first league title since 2017 with a record 91 points, 18 points clear of PAOK and almost managing to complete an undefeated run before losing 0–1 to PAOK in the third-to-last matchday. They also won the double by defeating AEK Athens 1–0 in the cup final, marking one of their most successful seasons both domestically and internationally.

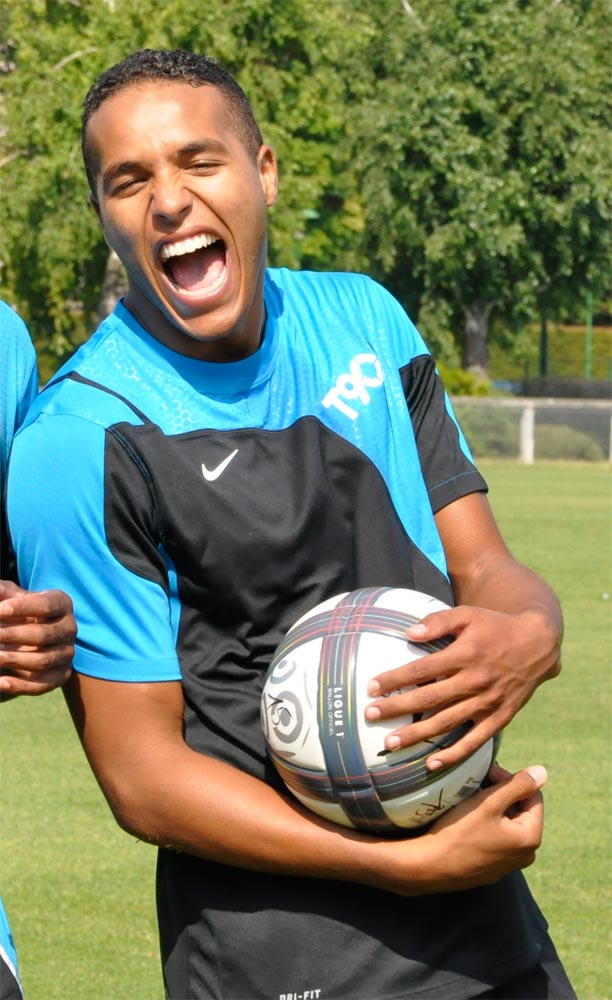
Youssef El-Arabi

The 2020–21 season started well for Olympiacos, securing their presence in the Champions League group stage for the 2nd year in a row, defeating Cyprtiot champions Omonia Nicosia 2–0 on aggregate. However, their campaign was rather mediocre having 1 win and 5 losses, in a group against Portuguese champions FC Porto, English giants Manchester City and French Marseille. They still however got 3rd-place finishing above Marseille on head to head away goals, both tied on 3 points. In the Europa League, they managed to defeat PSV Eindhoven beating them 4–2 at home and losing 2–1 at Philips Stadion, going through thanks to a 88th-minute goal by Ahmed Hassan. They then had to face Arsenal once again in the Round of 16, this time however losing 2–3 on aggregate despite beating them 0–1 in Emirates stadium and closing their campaign with a win. Domestically they dominated the league once again, finishing 26 points above 2nd-placed PAOK, to whom they lost the Greek Cup in the dying moments of the final.

The beginning of the 2021–22 season had Olympiacos being eliminated in the Champions League, where they lost to Bulgarian Ludogorets Razgrad 4–1 on penalties after 2 draws in Piraeus (1–1) and Razgrad (2–2) in the third qualifying round. They then beat ŠK Slovan Bratislava in the play-off round to secure a Europa League group stage spot. In a group with Eintracht Frankfurt, Fenerbahçe and Antwerp, Olympiacos finished second behind Eintracht with 3 wins and 3 losses and qualified for the knockout-round play-offs, where they met Italian side Atalanta, who eliminated them 5–1 on aggregate. Despite securing another Greek League title, Thrylos failed to win the cup for the second year in a row being eliminated by PAOK again on away goals. Martins remained manager of the club and renewed his contract for a fifth year, becoming one of the managers with the longest stay in the club.

After four seasons and winning 3 League titles with the club, Martins got fired from Olympiacos, in August 2022, and Spanish trainer Carlos Corberán was appointed as the new manager. He was succeeded by Michel, who later resigned and the 2022–23 season was completed by José Anigo.

=== UEFA Europa Conference League Winners & UEFA Youth League Winners (2023–24) ===
Olympiacos became the only Greek football club to have won a major UEFA competition, after their 2023–24 UEFA Europa Conference League triumph.

2024 UEFA Europa Conference League final starting line-up against Fiorentina, 29 May 2024

The 2023–24 season began with Diego Martinez in charge, until he was sacked in December, leaving the team in 4th place in the league and out of the Europa League, to be replaced by Carlos Carvalhal, whose stint only lasted for 2 months before being replaced by José Luis Mendilibar. Domestically, the club finished 3rd for the second consecutive time, and was eliminated in the Round of 16 of the Greek Cup.

However, the European campaign of this season proved to be the best in Olympiacos history. Beginning in the Europa League third qualifying round, the club ensured a group stage participation for the third season in a row, after knocking out Belgian KRC Genk and Serbian rookies FK Čukarički. There, they secured the 3rd place, finishing with 7 points and transferring to the Europa Conference League. After knocking out Hungarian champion Ferencváros in the play-offs with 2 Ayoub El Kaabi goals, they faced Israeli Maccabi Tel Aviv in the Round of 16, and got stunned by a 1–4 defeat at Karaiskakis Stadium. However, in the return fixture in TSC Arena, in front of 49 loyal supporters, the Red-Whites managed to achieve one of the greatest comebacks in the history of European football, by winning 6–1 on extra time and becoming the only football club to overcome a 3-goal home deficit in UEFA competitions.

Entering a European quarter-final for the first time since 1998–99, their next opponent were Fenerbahçe, whom they beat 3–2 at home, thanks to goals from Kostas Fortounis, Stevan Jovetić and Chiquinho. In the second leg in Şükrü Saracoğlu, the game ended 1–0 in favour of Fenerbahçe, thanks to a 12th-minute İrfan Kahveci goal. Eventually, the tie went to an extra time and then to a penalty shootout. There, 21-year old goalkeeper Konstantinos Tzolakis made history, saving 3 penalties in total, including the decisive one by Leonardo Bonucci and earning Olympiacos its first-ever appearance in a European semi-final in their 99-year history, winning 2–3 on penalties.

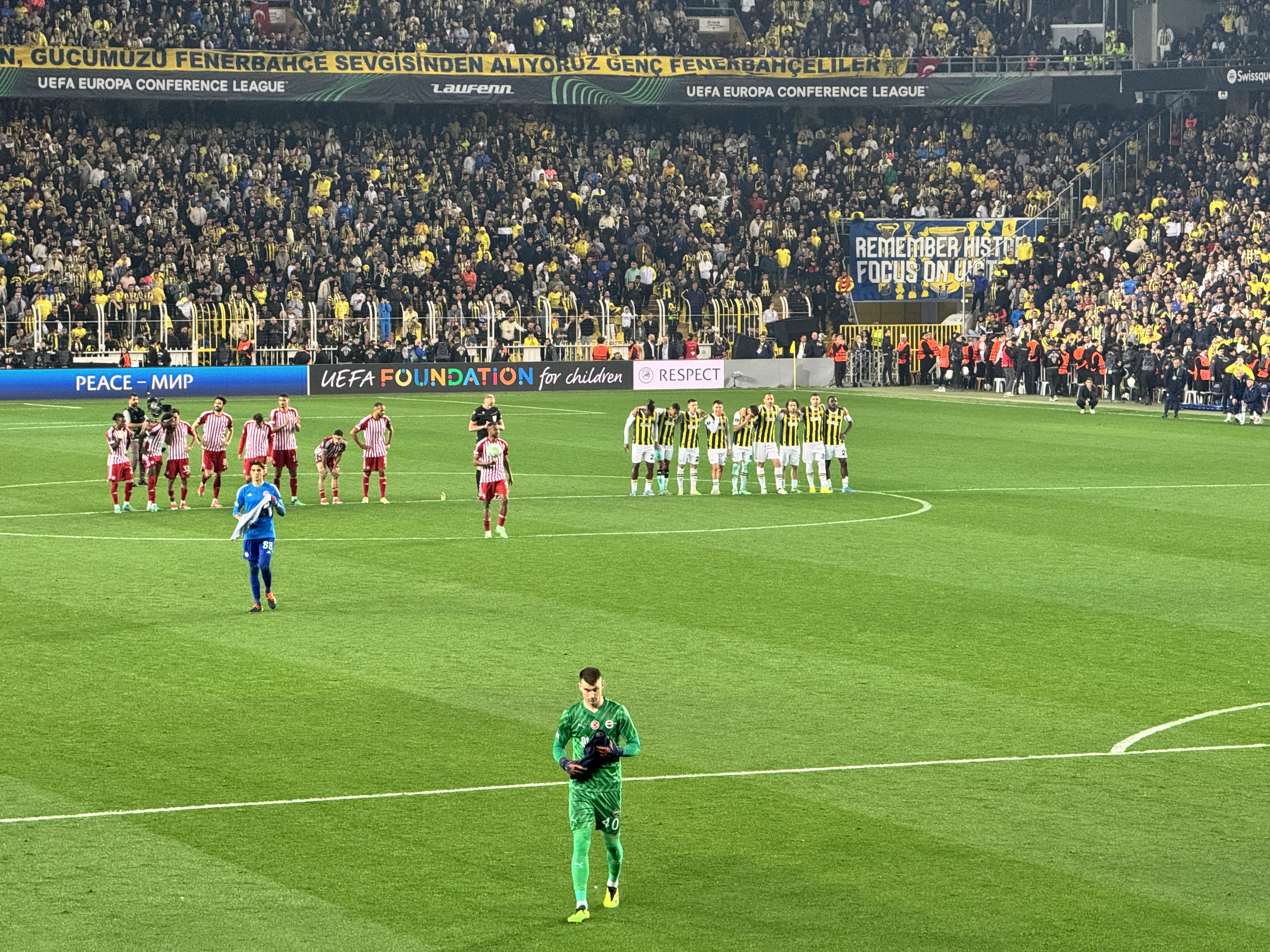
Olympiacos eliminated Turkish club Fenerbahçe (2–3 on penalties) in the quarter-finals of the 2023–24 UEFA Europa Conference League, with goalkeeper Konstantinos Tzolakis saving 3 penalties in the process.

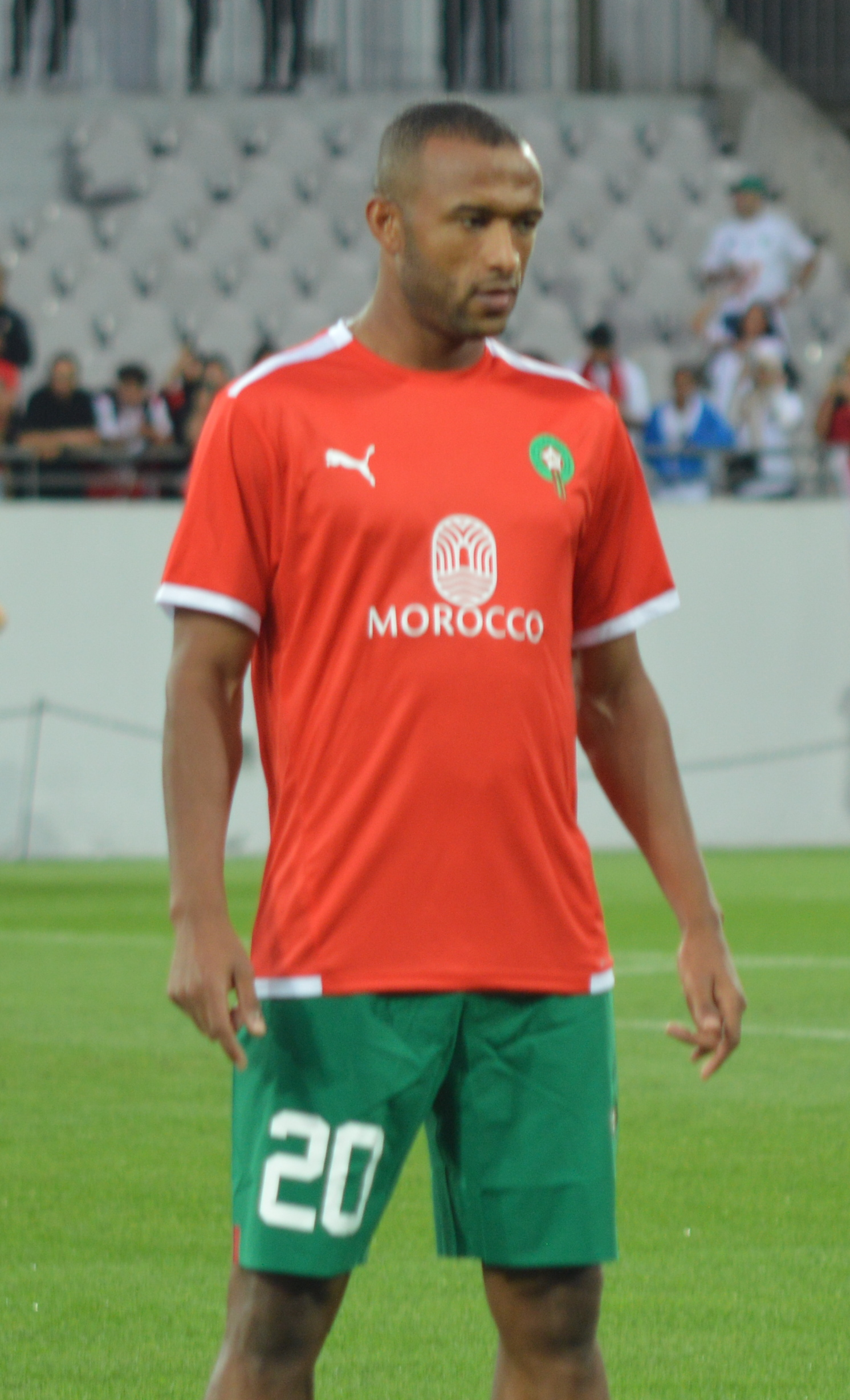
Ayoub El Kaabi, top scorer of the 2023–24 UEFA Europa Conference League with 11 goals, scored the crucial goal in the 116th minute of the extra time in the Final.

In the semi-final, Olympiacos had to face Aston Villa, whom at the time were 4th in the Premier League and were in one of their best seasons under Unai Emery. Despite entering the tie as massive underdogs, Olympiacos crushed the Villans with a 6–2 aggregate score, winning both legs and having El Kaabi scoring 5 goals, tying a record held by Cristiano Ronaldo and Radamel Falcao. This marked the first time a Greek Club entered the final of a European competition since 1971. Their final opponent, was Italian powerhouse ACF Fiorentina, who themselves appeared in the last year's final, losing 1–2 to West Ham in the last minute of the match.

The final was held in rival AEK Athens' Agia Sophia Stadium on 29 May, the same day Constantinople fell 571 years prior. Pressure was immense going into the game, with thousands of fans coming to support the team in the stadium and hundreds of thousands of others watching the game in the streets of Piraeus. A close game, poor in chances and with a lot of tension ended in a 0–0 draw after 90 minutes. With everything looking like the tie would be settled on penalties, a 116th minute cross by Santiago Hezze landed on El Kaabi's head, who put the ball in Terracciano's net to make it 1–0, causing delirium among millions of Olympiacos fans all over the world. After a VAR check by Artur Soares Dias, the goal was confirmed and the game ended in that score, with Olympiacos making history and becoming the only Greek football club to win a UEFA competition. This has been described by many as the greatest achievement in the history of Greek football, since the Greek national team's Euro 2004 victory. Their odds of winning the competition after their 1–4 home loss to Maccabi in the Round of 16 were just 0.1%.

Five weeks earlier, Olympiacos' Youth U-19 team celebrated winning the UEFA Youth League by beating Milan in the final that was held at the Colovray Stadium in Nyon, Switzerland, to secure their first ever title in the competition and the club's first ever European title. The U-19 team later faced Flamengo in the Under-20 Intercontinental Cup but was defeated with a score of 2–1.

=== Globe Soccer Awards ===
Olympiacos was awarded as the revelation team of 2024 at the Globe Soccer Awards.

=== Return to championships ===
In 2025, under the management of Mendilibar, the club won the 2024-25 Super League title, their first domestic title after two years, and later qualified for the 2025-26 Champions League league phase. They eventually also won the 2024-25 Greek cup to achieve their 19th double.

=== Return to UCL ===
In the League phase, they were drawn against Pafos, Arsenal, Barcelona, PSV Eindhoven, Real Madrid, Kairat, Bayer Leverkusen and Ajax.

During this timeframe, Olympiacos negotiated with Inter Milan in order to add striker Mehdi Taremi in the club's player roster. After he signed for the club, he scored a brace against Panserraikos in his debut game, helping the club achieve a 5-0 win in the third matchday of the 2025-26 Super League Greece season.

Daniel Podence, who was amongst the team that won the UEFA Europa Conference League during the 2023-24 season, returned to the club, once again on loan, and also scored in the game against Panserraikos.

The game against Pafos ended in a 0-0 draw for Olympiacos. The club then played against Arsenal, losing 2-0. Subsequently, Olympiacos faced Barcelona, losing 6-1 in a game where The Reds had many complaints regarding the refereeing decisions. They then went on to face Eindhoven, and despite going up 1-0 early in the game and having many chances to increase the lead, they conceded in the final minute, dropping 2 crucial points. Olympiacos then played against Real Madrid, and went up 1-0, however despite its best efforts the club would lose 3-4 in a dramatic game. The Reds would travel to Kazakhstan for a must win game against Kairat, where they would manage to win 1-0. Later, in the start of 2026, the Red-Whites then played a home game against Bayer Leverkusen, which they won 2-0. In the final league phase match, Olympiacos won 1-2 against Ajax and finished 18th in the league phase of the UEFA Champions League, thus advancing to the play-offs in a historic match. However, they did not manage to advance to the Round of 16 as they were knocked out by Bayer Leverkusen.

Domestically, after the new year had arrived and the restoration of the Super Cup, Olympiacos went on to win their 5th title in the competition by beating OFI 3-0 after extra time. By winning their 5th Super Cup, they went on to achieve their 3rd domestic treble. However, Olympiacos was later knocked out by PAOK 0-2 in a home match for the 2025-26 Greek cup. They also eventually lost the championship by finishing 2nd in the Greek League, behind AEK Athens which went on to win its 14th title in the competition.

On 10 March 2026, Olympiacos celebrated its 101st birthday.

On the 12th of March 2026, it was confirmed that Ayoub El Kaabi renewed his contract with Olympiacos, signing a two year contract with the option to extend for an additional year.

=== 2026-27 ===
On 2 June 2026, Olympiacos announced the return of Kostas Fortounis. After finishing second the previous season, and after Aston Villa finished 4th in the Premier League and conquered the 2025-26 UEFA Europa League, Olympiacos qualified for the third qualifying round of the UEFA Champions League, and were also assured of their presence in the league phase of the 2026-27 UEFA Europa League, in case they were knocked out in the qualifying round of the Champions League.

On 9 September 2026, Mendilibar was sacked from his role as head coach of the team, and was replaced by Imanol Alguacil.

== Centenary ==
In March 2025, Olympiacos Football Club celebrated its 100th anniversary with a series of events and initiatives honoring its history and fanbase. The celebrations took place over several days, including activities at the "G. Karaiskakis" Stadium and throughout Piraeus.

== Crest and colours ==
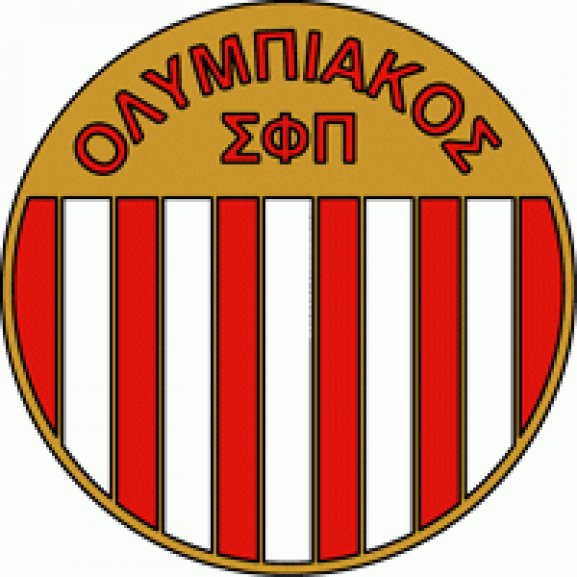
The crest of Olympiacos from 1959 to 1973

When, in 1925, the merger of the two clubs of Piraeus, Athlitikos Podosfairikos Syllogos Pireos and Omilos Filathlon Pireos, gave birth to a new football club, the latter was unanimously baptised Olympiacos Club of Fans of Piraeus, a name inspired by the Ancient Olympic Games; the morality, the vying, the splendor, the sportsmanship and the ideal of fair play that were represented in Ancient Greece. Consequently, after Notis Kamperos's proposal, the club adopted the laurel-crowned adolescent as their emblem, which symbolises the winner of the Olympic Games, a crest that has undergone only minor changes through the ages. Red and white were chosen as the colours of the crest; red for passion and victory and white for virtue and purity.

The typical kit of the team is that of a shirt with red and white vertical stripes, and red or white shorts and socks. The shirt has taken different forms during the history of the club, for example with thin or wider stripes. The second most common kit is the all-red one and next the all-white one. Olympiacos has used several other colours during its history as an away or third kit, with the most notable of them being the monotint black or silver one. The most common kits of Olympiacos during their history are these below (the year of each one is indicant):

=== Kit manufacturers and shirt sponsors ===
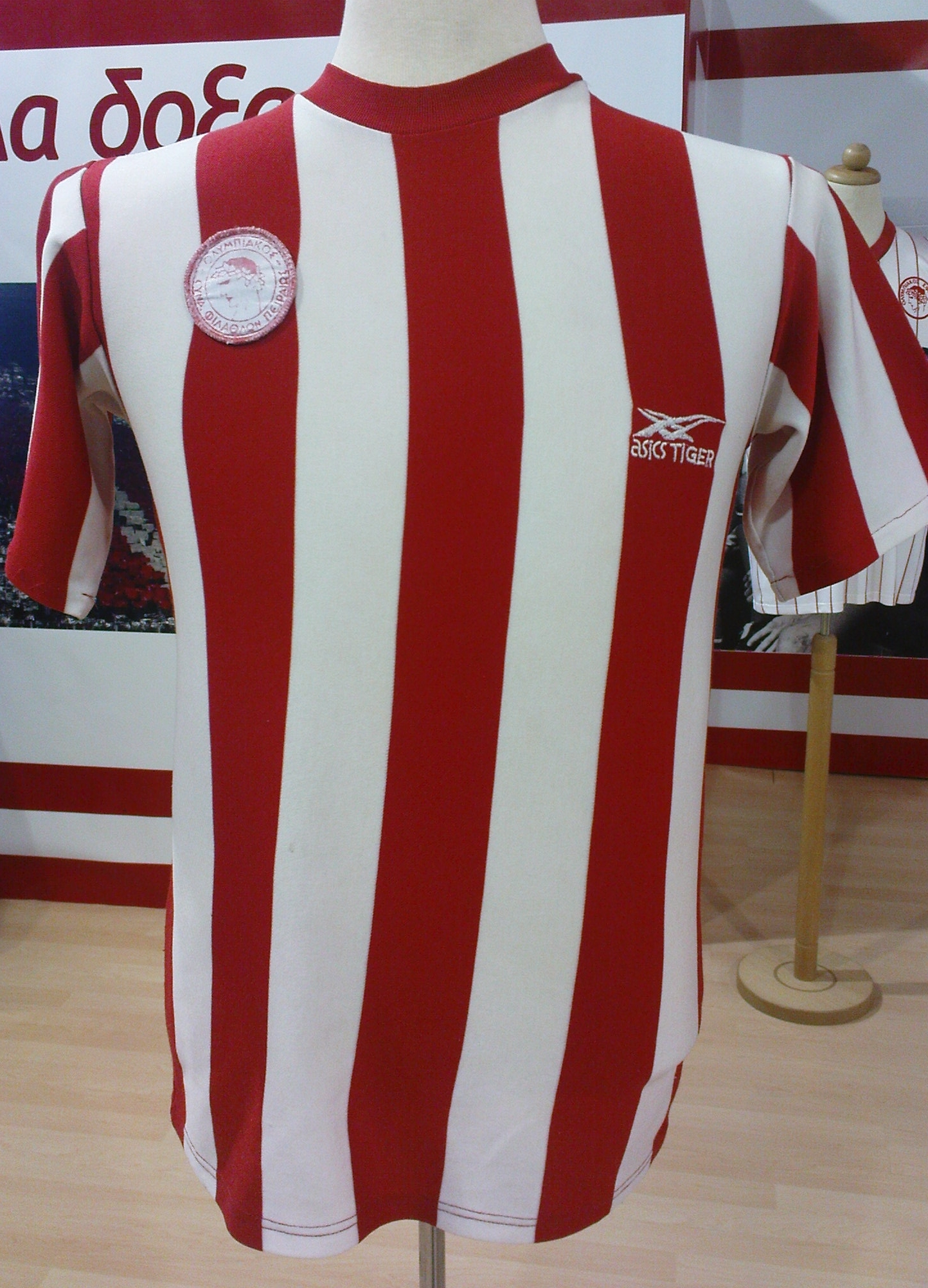
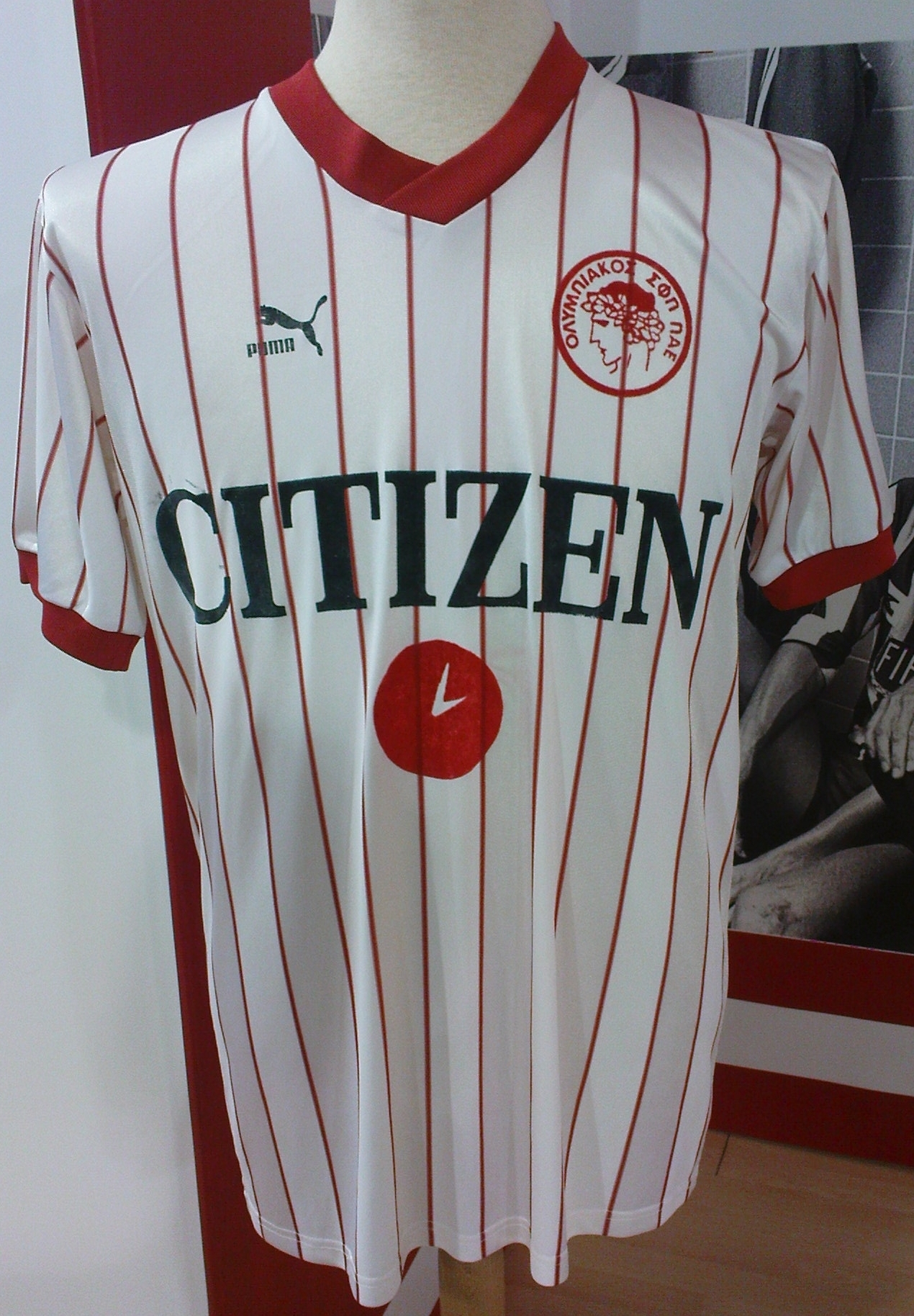
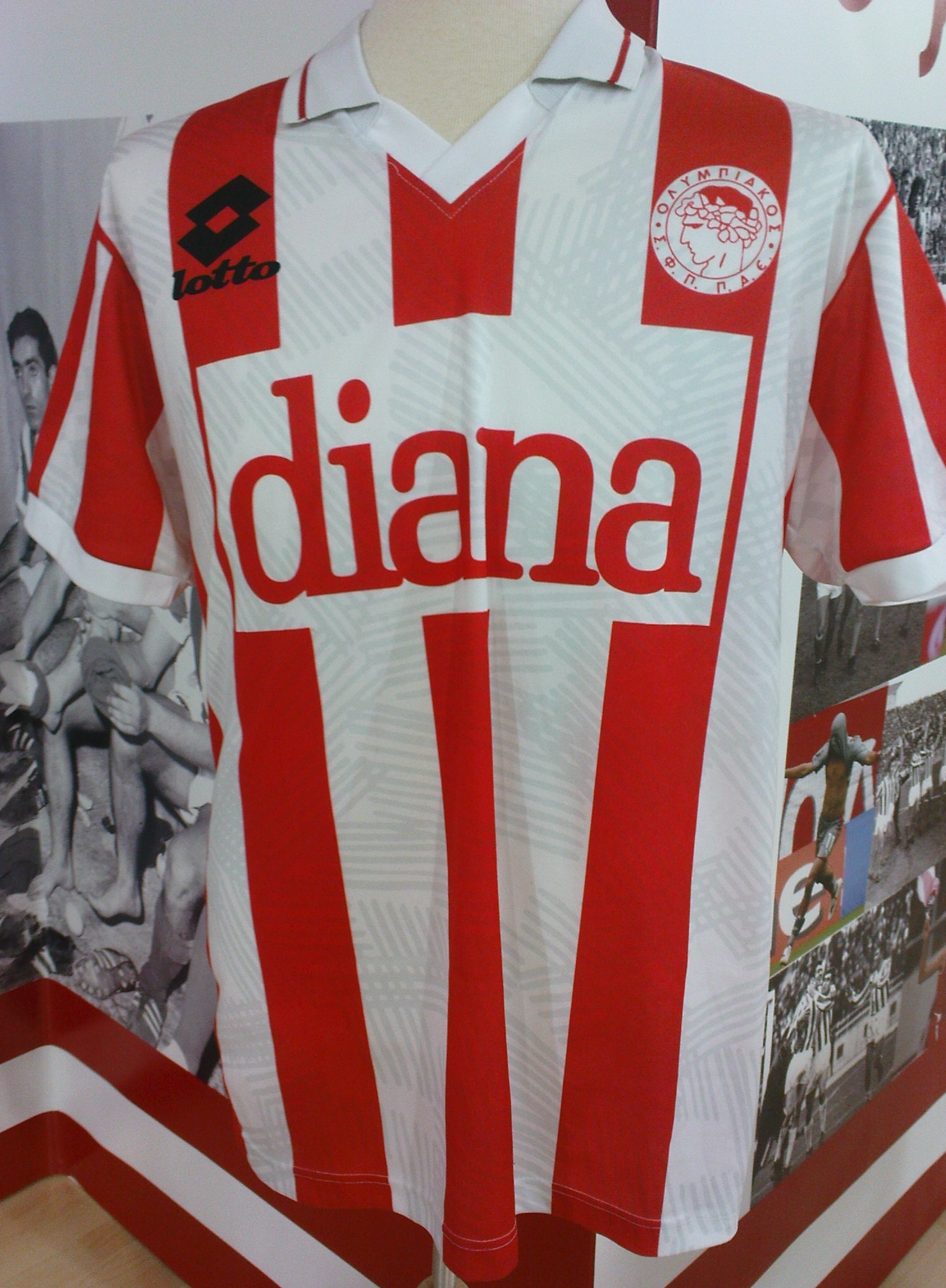
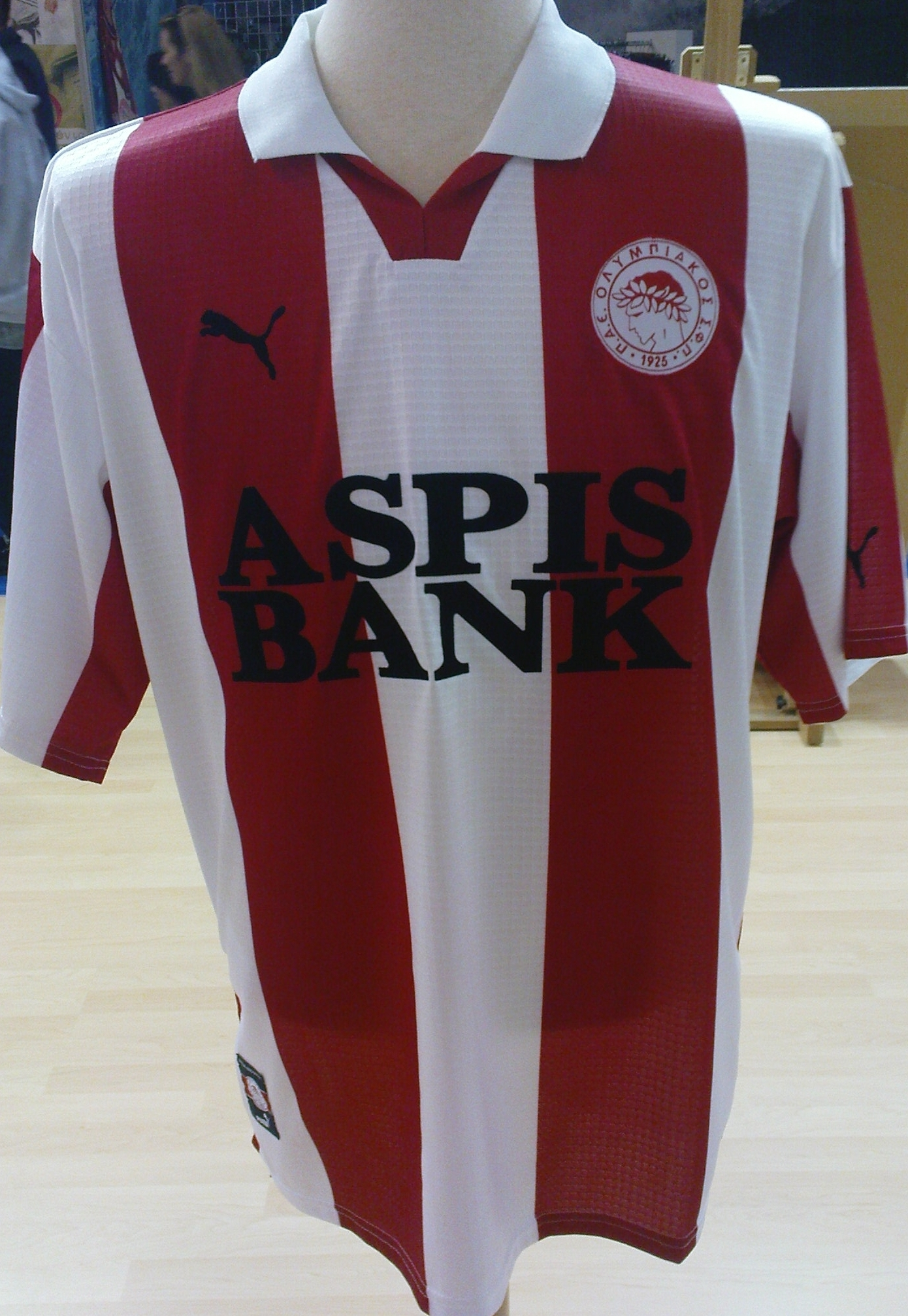
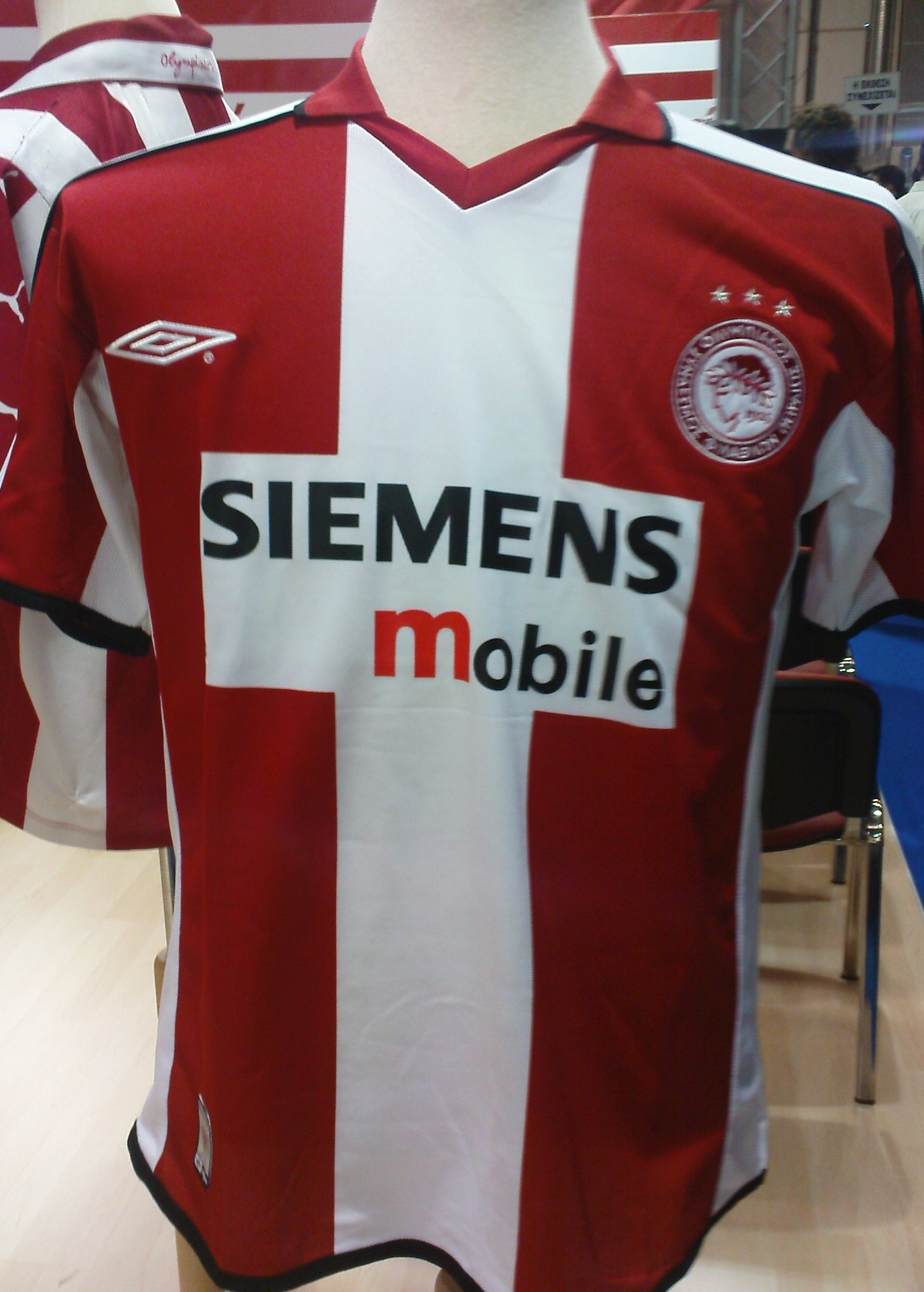
Olympiacos historical shirts

Since 1979, when football became professional in Greece, Olympiacos had a specific kit manufacturer and since 1982 a specific shirt sponsor as well. The following table shows in detail Olympiacos kit manufacturers and shirt sponsors by year:

Period	Kit manufacturer	Shirt sponsor
1979	Umbro	—
1980	Puma	—
1980–1982	ASICS Tiger	—
1982	Adidas	—
1982–1984	ASICS Tiger	Fiat
1984–1985	ASICS Tiger	Travel Plan
1985–1988	Puma	Citizen
1988	Puma	Toyota
1989	Puma	Bank of Crete
1989–1990	Puma	—
1990–1992	Puma	Diana
1992–1993	Umbro	Diana
1993–1994	Lotto	Diana
1994–1995	Adidas	Ethnokarta MasterCard
1995–1997	Puma	Ethnokarta MasterCard
1997–2000	Puma	Aspis Bank
2000–2005	Umbro	Siemens Mobile
2005–2006	Puma	Siemens
2006–2009	Puma	Vodafone
2009–2010	Puma	Citibank
2010–2013	Puma	Pame Stoixima
2013–2015	Puma	UNICEF
2015–	Adidas	Stoiximan.gr

== Stadium ==
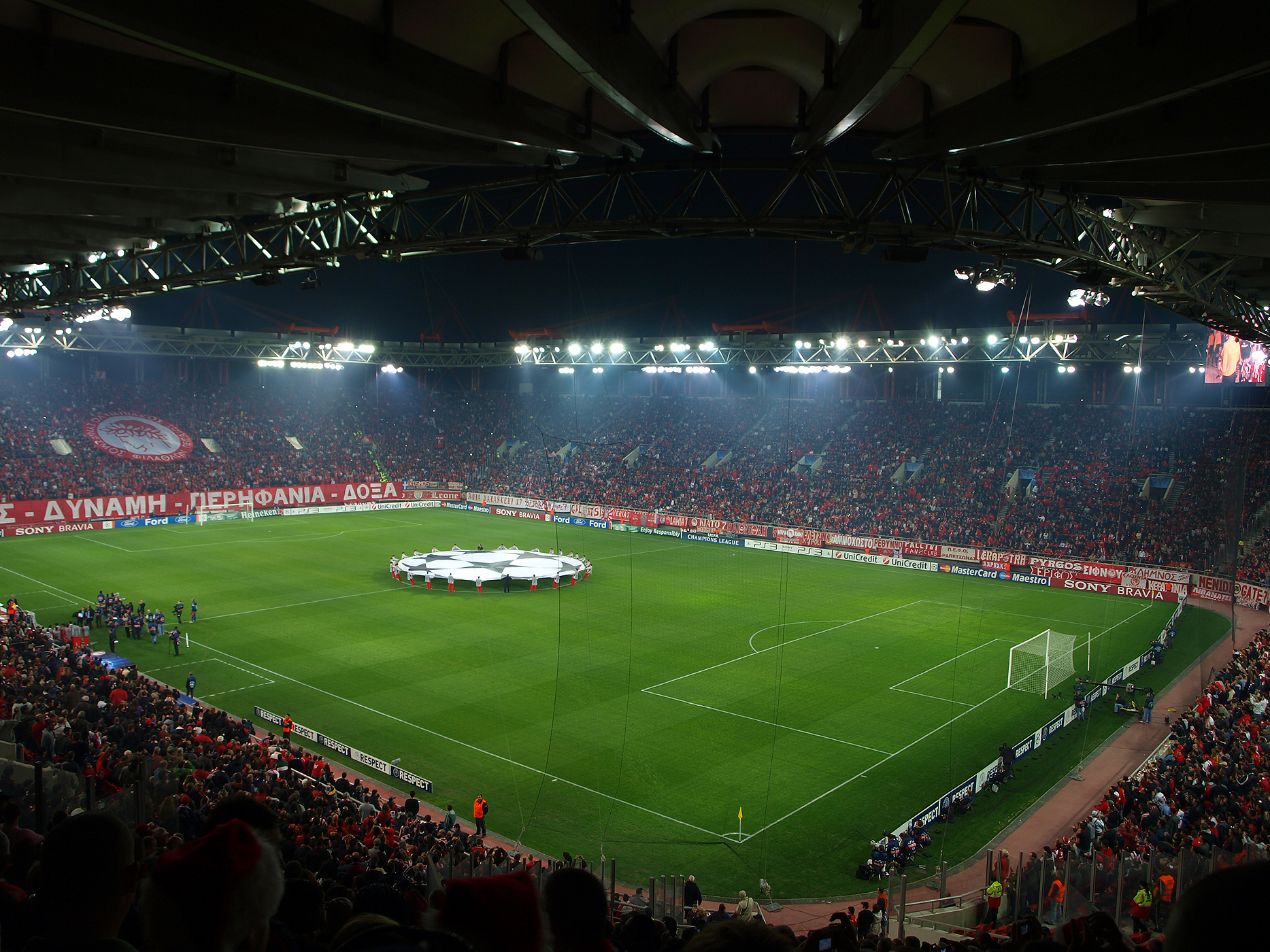
The Karaiskakis Stadium during a 2009–10 UEFA Champions League fixture against Arsenal

The Karaiskakis Stadium, situated at Neo Faliro in Piraeus, is the current (since 2004) and traditional home of Olympiacos. With a capacity of 32,115, it is the largest football-only stadium and the second largest football stadium overall in Greece. It was built in 1895 as Neo Phaliron Velodrome, to host the cycling events for the 1896 Summer Olympics in Athens, and the pitch was covered with curm. Olympiacos has used it since its foundation in 1925. In 1964, the stadium was renovated and was given its current name after Georgios Karaiskakis, a military commander of the Greek War of Independence, with an athletics track around the pitch.

Olympiacos left the Karaiskakis Stadium temporarily to play home matches at the newly built Athens Olympic Stadium in 1984. After a five-year use (1984–1989) of the biggest stadium in Greece, the team returned to their traditional home, where they played until 1997. Olympiacos then returned to Athens Olympic Stadium, where they stayed for another period of five years (1997–2002). In 2002, the Olympic Stadium was closed for renovation work due to the 2004 Summer Olympics and Olympiacos moved to Georgios Kamaras Stadium in Rizoupoli, home of Apollon Smyrnis, for the following two seasons (2002–2004).

Meanwhile, the Karaiskakis Stadium had fallen into disrepair and was not suitable for football matches anymore. In 2003, its use passed to Olympiacos in order to build a football-only ground, to be used for the football tournament of the 2004 Olympics. In return, Olympiacos got exclusive use of the stadium until 2052, covering all maintenance costs and also paying 15% of revenue to the Greek State. The old stadium was demolished in the spring of 2003 and the new one was completed on 30 June 2004 at a total cost of €60 million. Nowadays, the Karaiskakis Stadium is one of the most modern football grounds in Europe, also hosting the museum of Olympiacos, with several facilities around.

== Identity and support ==
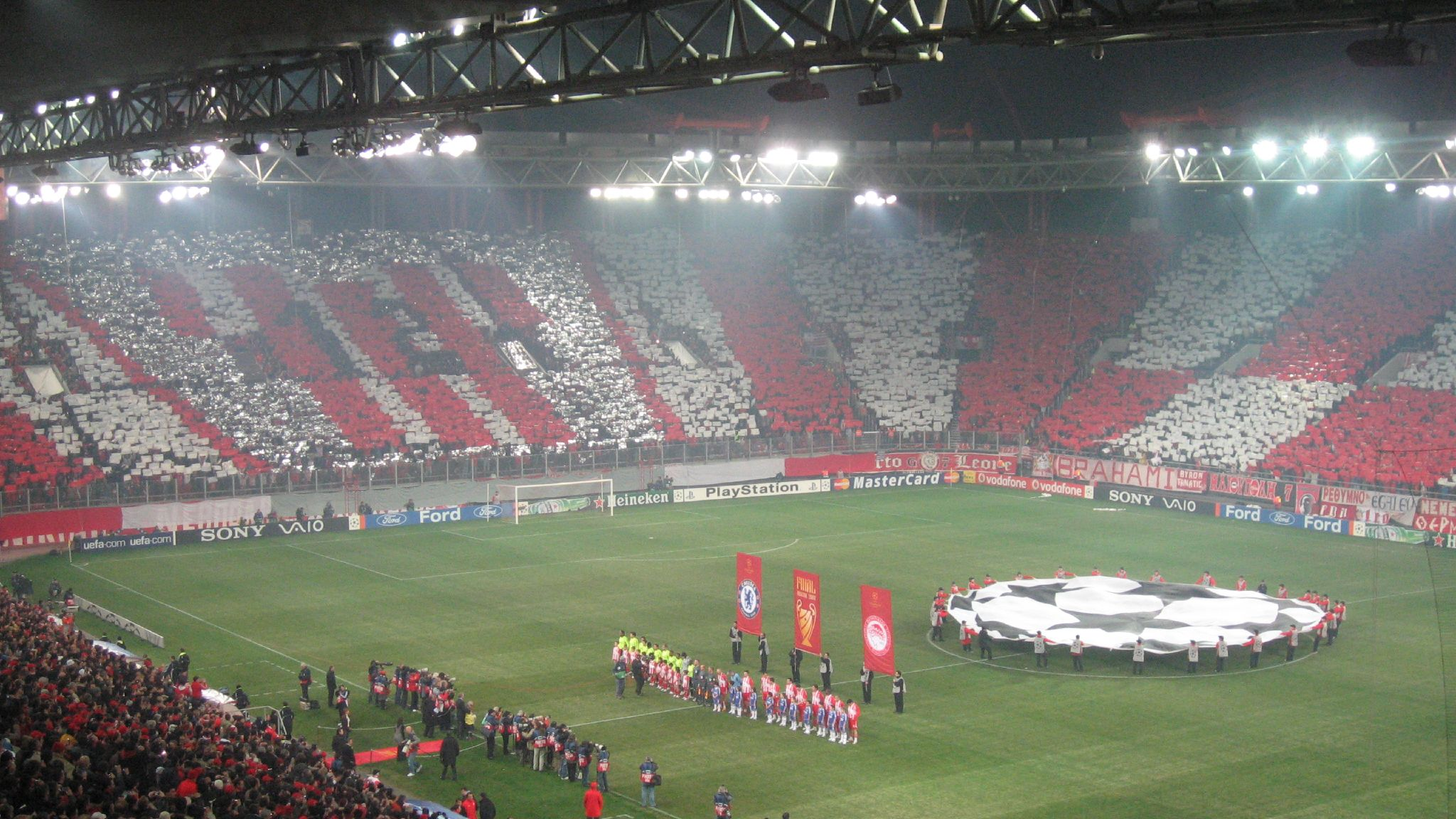
Olympiacos fans provide their support with extreme passion at home, as well as away matches. Here, at the Karaiskakis Stadium against Chelsea for the knockout stage of the 2007–08 UEFA Champions League.

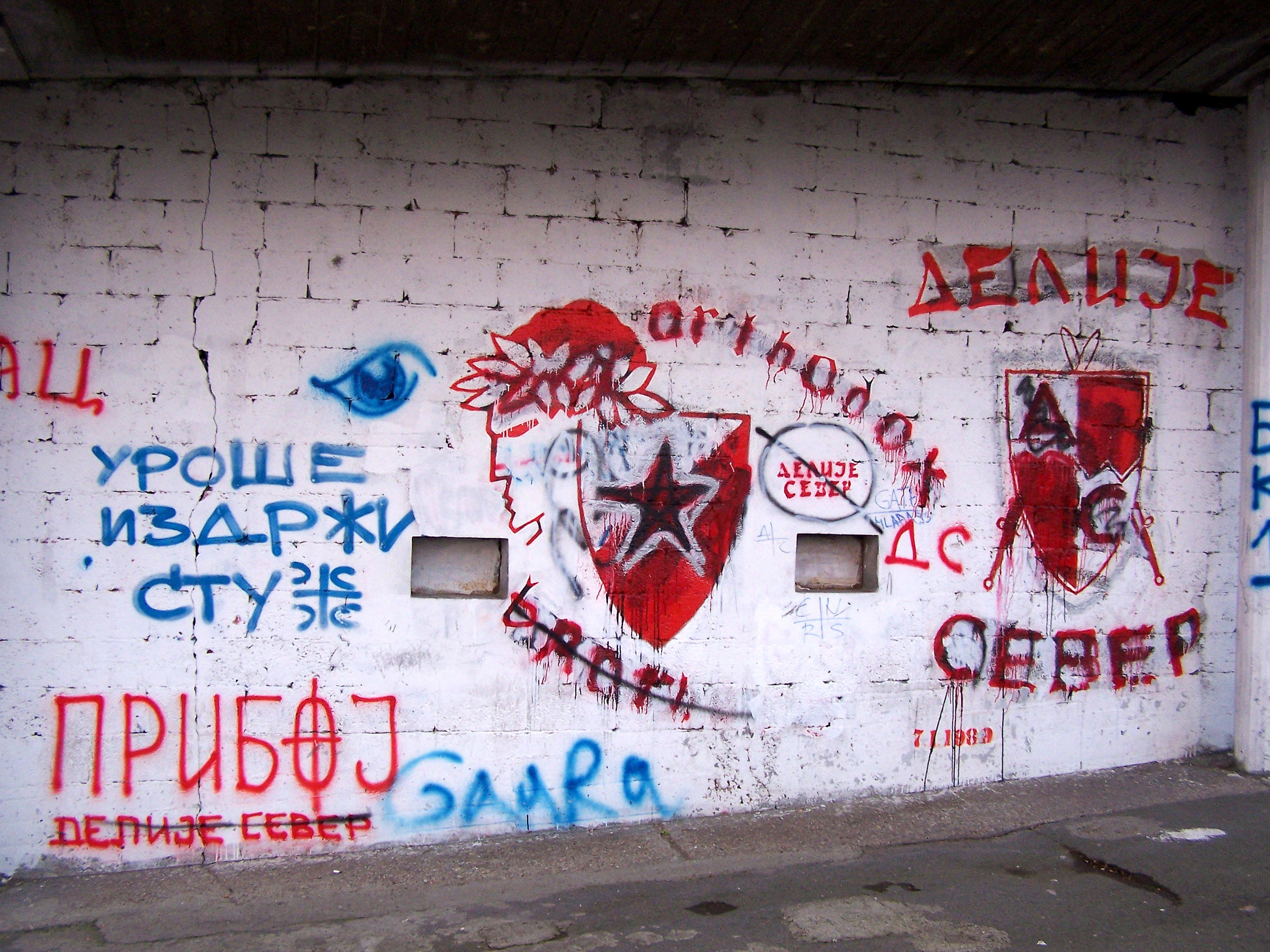
Mural at the Stadion Crvena Zvezda, Belgrade, featuring the brotherhood between the fans of Olympiacos and Red Star Belgrade.

Olympiacos' traditional fanbase comes from the city of Piraeus, where the club is based, as well as a good part of the rest of the Athens area. The club's popularity increased during the 1950s after winning consecutive titles and setting several records, and they became the best-supported football club in the country.

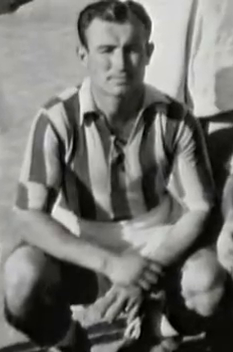
Nikos Godas, an Olympiacos player and communist guerilla of ELAS, has become a symbol of Olympiacos' anti-fascist fans.

Traditionally, Olympiacos represents the working class of Piraeus and is considered an anti-systemic club fighting against the Athenian aristocracy represented by Panathinaikos.

Olympiacos is the most popular Greek club according to UEFA and numerous polls and researchers. Several newspaper and magazine polls rank Olympiacos as the most popular club in Greece with a percentage varying between 30 and 40% among football fans and roughly 30% of the total population, which corresponds to around three and a half million supporters in Greece. The club is overwhelmingly popular in Piraeus, where almost half of the population supports Olympiacos, while their support in the whole of Athens reaches 30% of football fans, making them the 3rd most popular club in the Greek capital. They are also the most popular club among the working class with 37% support, and in all age groups as well as among both male and female fans; the vast majority of their fans come from the centre-left and centre-right of the political spectrum. Outside of Athens, Olympiacos is the most popular club in Central Greece, the Peloponnese, and Thessaly. Additionally, they have the highest average all-time attendance in Greek football, having topped the attendance tables in most of the seasons in Super League Greece history.

=== Friendships ===
- (Serbia) Red Star Belgrade

In 2006, Olympiacos was among the top ten clubs with the most paying members in the world, holding ninth place, just ahead of Real Madrid. As of April 2006, the club had some 83,000 registered members. Olympiacos and Red Star Belgrade fans have developed a deep friendship, calling themselves the "Orthodox Brothers". Usually, Olympiacos supporters from several fan-clubs attend Red Star's matches, especially against their old rival Partizan, and vice versa. More recently, the Orthodox Brothers have started to include fans of Spartak Moscow in their club.

Olympiacos fans are renowned for their passionate and fervent support of the team, with the atmosphere at home matches regarded as intimidating. When they played Newcastle United at home in the 2004–05 UEFA Cup, the match was televised in the United Kingdom on Channel 5 and the guest commentator was former England international Tony Cottee, who was constantly mentioning how great the atmosphere was. During the game he was asked whether it was the most atmospheric stadium he had been to and replied: "I'd have to say it probably is. You hear a lot about various places and the atmosphere there but when you go you realise it's not all that... But this place is the real deal." The experienced Czech international winger Jaroslav Plašil paid further testament to the hostile atmosphere created by Olympiacos fans at home before his team, Bordeaux, visited the Karaiskakis Stadium, where he had played during his time with Monaco and stated, "It was one of the most intense atmospheres I've ever experienced in a stadium, so I expect it will be a bit like hell for us. Their supporters really can help their team." Former Paris Saint-Germain superstar striker Zlatan Ibrahimović spoke of his admiration for Olympiacos supporters after an Olympiacos–Paris Saint-Germain match on 17 September 2013: "They played in front of their fantastic public. Olympiacos supporters were amazing. My friend Olof Mellberg played here and he talked to me about the supporters. I never saw it live, but now I understand. It's amazing. It's a big advantage for Olympiacos." PSG billionaire owner Nasser Al-Khelaifi stated, "I have big respect for the fans here. I've never seen fans like Olympiacos' fans in my life." PSG and Brazil international winger Lucas Moura in an interview with goal.com stated that Olympiacos home ground was the most intense and heated stadium he's ever played in.

=== The Gate 7 tragedy ===
The history of the Karaiskakis Stadium and Olympiacos was marked by the worst tragedy that ever hit Greek sports, known as the Karaiskakis Stadium disaster. On 8 February 1981, Olympiacos hosted AEK Athens for a league match, which ended 6–0, in an unprecedented triumph for the host team of Piraeus. During the last minutes of the game, thousands of Olympiacos fans at Gate 7 rushed to the exit, to get to the stadium's main entrance and celebrate with the players, but the doors were almost closed and the turnstiles still in place, making the exit almost impossible. As people continued to come down from the stands, unable to see what happened, the stairs of Gate 7 became a death trap; people were crushed, tens of fans were seriously injured and twenty-one young people died, most of them by suffocation.

In memory of this event, every year on 8 February, there is a memorial service at the stadium in honour of the supporters that died in that incident. The service is attended by thousands of fans every year, who are rhythmically shouting the phrase, "Αδέρφια, ζείτε, εσείς μας οδηγείτε." (Adhélfia, zíte, esís mas odhiyíte, "Brothers, you live, you are the ones who guide us."). At the tribune part of the stadium where Gate 7 is now, some seats are coloured black instead of red, shaping the number "7", whereas there is also a monument on the eastern side of the stadium, bearing the names of all 21 supporters killed on that day in the stadium.

Even though this incident affected almost solely the fanbase of Olympiacos, other teams occasionally pay their respects to the people killed as well, as they consider the incident to be a tragedy not only for one team, but for the whole country. In the past, even foreign teams, such as Liverpool and Red Star Belgrade, have honoured the incident's victims.

=== Non-Greek fanbase ===
In recent years, Olympiacos' fanbase has extended beyond Greeks to include fans from other countries. Most notably, there are many fans in China through the organization Olympiacos China, founded by a Chinese fan of Olympiacos.

== Rivalries ==
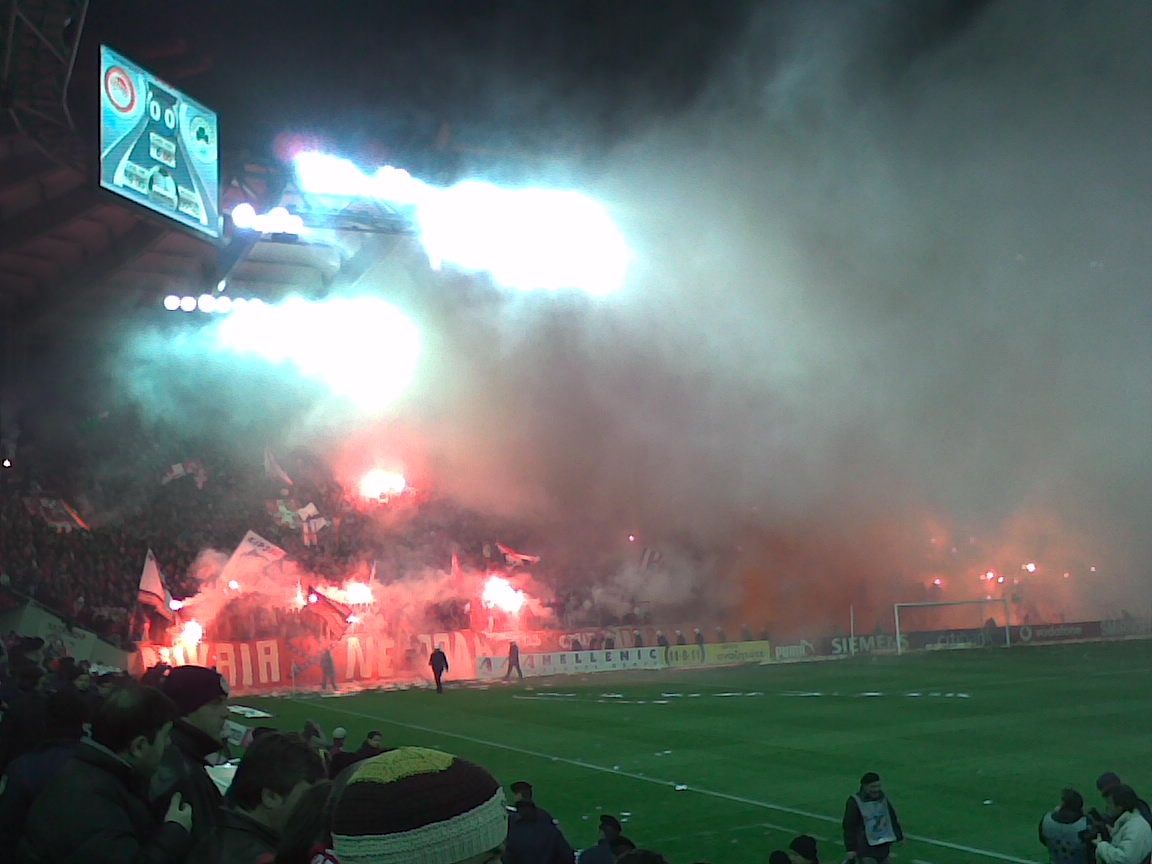
Olympiacos fans in Karaiskakis Stadium during a 3–2 derby win against rivals Panathinaikos.

Traditionally, Olympiacos' main rival is Panathinaikos, and their so-called "Derby of the Eternal Enemies" is a classic local derby in Attica, the most famous fixture in Greek football and one of the most well known around the world. The two clubs are the most successful in Greece, having won together a total of 68 League titles (Olympiacos 48, Panathinaikos 20). The rivalry also encompasses social, cultural and regional differences; Olympiacos, coming from the famous port of Piraeus, used to be very popular in the working to middle classes, while Panathinaikos, of downtown Athens, was considered the representative of middle to higher social classes, although this differentiation has weakened nowadays and the two clubs have similar fanbases. The most recent notorious incidents include a fan's death in 2007, during a pre-arranged clash between hooligans on the occasion of a women's volleyball game between the two clubs, which caused major upset in Greece, and the abandonment of a derby in 2012 after riots at the Athens Olympic Stadium, which resulted in major fires in parts of it.

Olympiacos also shares a traditional rivalry with AEK Athens, in another local derby of Attica with the other member of the so-called Big Three, but also with PAOK, in the fiercest inter-region rivalry in Greece between two of the most popular clubs in the county, a rivalry that erupted in the 1960s for the sake of footballer Giorgos Koudas. A popular rivalry used to be the Piraeus derby, between Olympiacos and Ethnikos Piraeus, the second most successful football club in the region, but the fixture has faded-out due to Ethnikos' constant presence in lower divisions in the last decades. It remains a derby in water polo, where Olympiacos and Ethnikos compete in the top division.

== European and International performance ==
The UEFA Europa Conference League trophy won by Olympiacos in the 2023–24 season.

Olympiacos is the most successful Greek football club in European competitions, being the only club from Greece to have won a major European trophy; they won the UEFA Europa Conference League in 2023–24, sealing their title by winning against Italian side Fiorentina 1–0 in the Final. With their 2024 triumph, they became the first club outside the four biggest European leagues (Premier League, Serie A, La Liga and Bundesliga) to win a UEFA competition since 2011.

They are also the highest ranked Greek club in the UEFA rankings, occupying 36th place in the ten-year ranking, and 43rd in the five-year ranking as of 2024. They are one of the founding members of the European Club Association. They are also the Greek club with the most wins in all European competitions, leading the table with the most home and away wins, and the Greek team with the most games played at the European level, celebrating their 200th match on 23 February 2010, against Bordeaux in the 2009–10 UEFA Champions League first knockout round. Olympiacos also holds the all-time record attendance for a Greek club of 75,263 in a 1982–83 European Cup match against Hamburg at the Athens Olympic Stadium.

Olympiacos has a long presence in UEFA competitions, debuting on 13 September 1959, against Milan for the 1959–60 European Cup, the first ever Greek club to compete in a European competition. Olympiacos was also the first Greek club to advance to the next round of any European competition, eliminating Zagłębie Sosnowiec for the 1963–64 European Cup Winners' Cup.

Besides their 2023–24 UEFA Conference League triumph, other major European successes include their advance to the quarter-finals of the UEFA Champions League in 1998–99, where they lost a semi-final spot in the dying minutes to Juventus, and their advance to the quarter-finals of the UEFA Cup Winners' Cup in 1992–93, losing to Atlético Madrid.

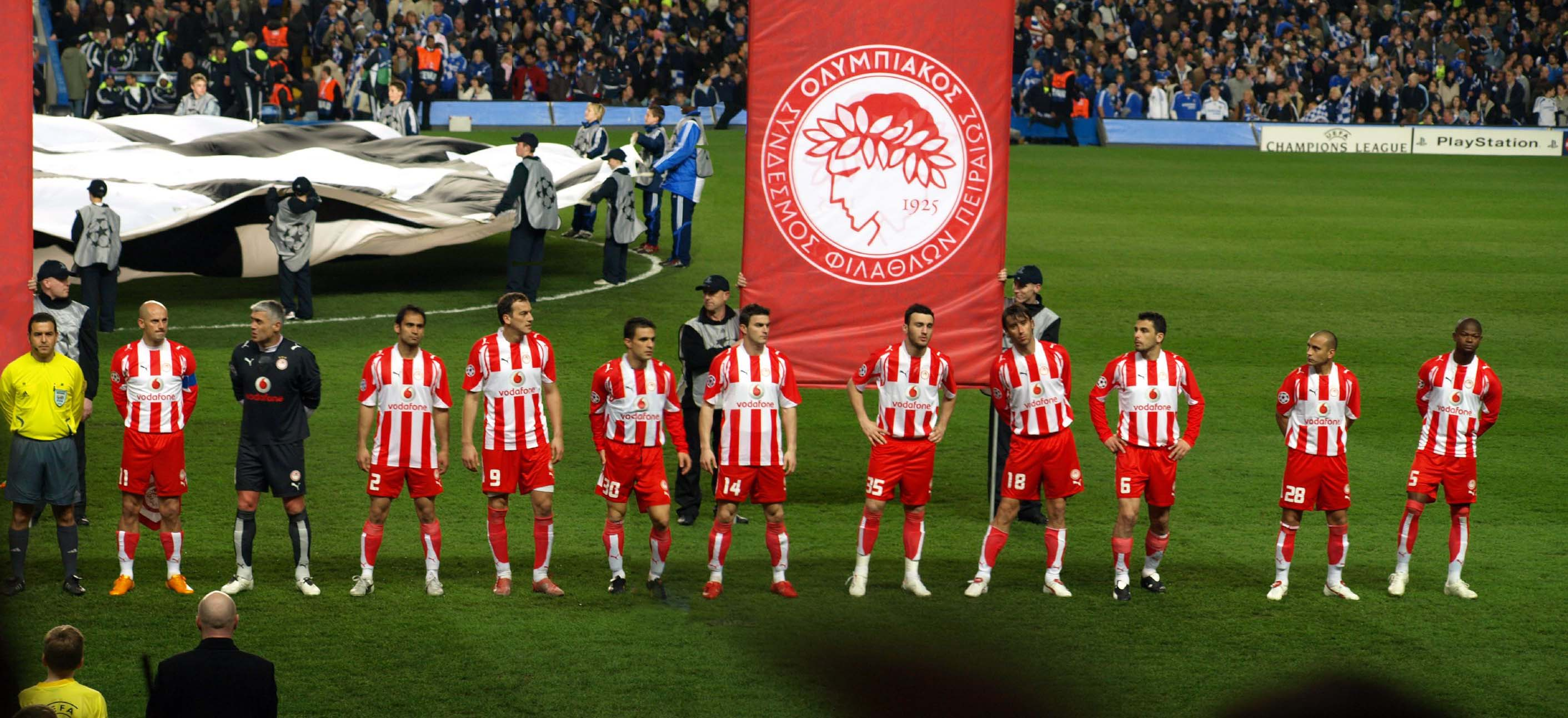
Olympiacos players arrayed in Stamford Bridge, in the second match for the 2007–08 UEFA Champions League first knockout round against Chelsea.

Olympiacos has eliminated (in either finals, knockout matches or group stages) clubs like Milan, Arsenal, Ajax, Benfica, Porto, Borussia Dortmund, Lazio, Celtic, PSV Eindhoven, Aston Villa, Werder Bremen, Fiorentina, Anderlecht, Monaco, Deportivo La Coruña, Hertha BSC, Cagliari and Standard Liège, among many others. They have spent most of their European history in the UEFA Champions League, where they are widely known for being a strong home side, having run some long-standing sequences, such as the 15 straight UEFA Champions League unbeaten home matches since their debut in the tournament under its new format, when Manchester United stopped their record in their fifth consecutive participation, and their 15 wins in 19 UEFA Champions League home matches between 2009–10 and 2014–15. They have a vast record of home wins over traditional European powerhouses and UEFA Champions League winners like Real Madrid, Milan, Liverpool, Manchester United, Ajax, Juventus, Arsenal, Borussia Dortmund, Benfica, Porto, PSV Eindhoven, Celtic, Aston Villa, Olympique Lyonnais, Olympique Marseille, Atlético Madrid, Valencia, Sevilla, Leverkusen and Red Star Belgrade among many others. From 2007 to 2016, Olympiacos participated seven times in the UEFA Champions League Group Stage, and gathered at least 9 points in every one of those seven groups, qualifying three times for the knockout stage (Last 16) of the competition (2007–08, 2009–10, 2013–14).

Olympiacos has also won the Balkans Cup in 1963, at a time when the competition was considered the second most important in the region after the European Cup, becoming the first ever Greek club to win an international competition.

The UEFA Youth League trophy won by Olympiacos U-19 in the 2023–24 season.

Another major European success was achieved by Olympiacos U-19 team in the 2023–24 season. One month before Olympiacos won the 2023–24 UEFA Europa Conference League, Olympiacos U-19 team won the UEFA Youth League against AC Milan in the final, eliminating Inter Milan, Bayern Munich and Nantes in the process. Thus, Olympiacos won two out of four official UEFA club competitions of the 2023–24 season and became the first club in European football to have won two UEFA competitions in the same season.

As defending European champions in the 2024 season, the youth team of Olympiacos played the final of the U20 Intercontinental Cup against Flamengo. They were defeated 2–1.

=== UEFA competition record ===
As of 4 November 2026

European Team	Competition	Season	Pld	W	D	L	GF/GA
Olympiacos	European Cup / UEFA Champions League	37	198	69	40	89	233–301
Olympiacos	UEFA Cup Winners' Cup	9	33	14	6	13	43–47
Olympiacos	UEFA Cup / UEFA Europa League	29	142	61	28	53	201–181
Olympiacos	UEFA Europa Conference League	1	9	7	0	2	19–10
Results	Total	62 (76)*	382	151	74	157	496–539

- Note: It holds the record for the number of appearances (62) by a Greek club in European competitions—a competition series from which it has never been absent for two consecutive years. Of the 14 additional appearances (76), 9 occurred during the 1999–2000, 2000–01, 2004–05, 2011–12, 2012–13, 2014–15, 2015–16, 2019–20, and 2020–21 seasons, resulting from participation in the UEFA Cup/Europa League after finishing 3rd in the Champions League group stage; the other 5 occurred during the 2008–09, 2016–17, 2021–22, 2022–23, and 2026–27 seasons, following elimination in the Champions League qualifying rounds, which led to the team’s automatic entry into the UEFA Cup/Europa League.

=== Best campaigns ===
Season	Achievement	Notes
European Cup / UEFA Champions League
1974–75	Last 16	eliminated by Anderlecht 1–5 in Brussels, 3–0 in Patras
1982–83	Last 16	eliminated by Hamburg 0–1 in Hamburg, 0–4 in Athens
1983–84	Last 16	eliminated by Benfica 1–0 in Athens, 0–3 in Lisbon
1998–99	Quarter-finals	eliminated by Juventus 1–2 in Turin, 1–1 in Athens
2007–08	Last 16	eliminated by Chelsea 0–0 in Piraeus, 0–3 in London
2009–10	Last 16	eliminated by Bordeaux 0–1 in Piraeus, 1–2 in Bordeaux
2013–14	Last 16	eliminated by Manchester United 2–0 in Piraeus, 0–3 in Manchester
European Cup Winners' Cup
1961-62	Last 16	eliminated by Dynamo Žilina 2–3 in Piraeus, 0–1 in Žilina
1963–64	Last 16	eliminated by Lyon 1–4 in Lyon, 2–1 in Athens
1965–66	Last 16	eliminated by West Ham United 0–4 in London, 2–2 in Piraeus
1968–69	Last 16	eliminated by Dunfermline Athletic 0–4 in Dunfermline, 3–0 in Piraeus
1986–87	Last 16	eliminated by Ajax 0–4 in Amsterdam, 1–1 in Athens
1990–91	Last 16	eliminated by Sampdoria 0–1 in Piraeus, 1–3 in Genoa
1992–93	Quarter-finals	eliminated by Atlético Madrid 1–1 in Athens, 1–3 in Madrid
UEFA Cup / UEFA Europa League
1989–90	Last 16	eliminated by Auxerre 1–1 in Piraeus, 0–0 in Auxerre
2004–05	Last 16	eliminated by Newcastle United 1–3 in Piraeus, 0–4 in Newcastle
2011–12	Last 16	eliminated by Metalist Kharkiv 1–0 in Kharkiv, 1–2 in Piraeus
2016–17	Last 16	eliminated by Beşiktaş 1–1 in Piraeus, 1–4 in Istanbul
2019–20	Last 16	eliminated by Wolverhampton Wanderers 1–1 in Piraeus, 0–1 in Wolverhampton
2020–21	Last 16	eliminated by Arsenal 1–3 in Piraeus, 1–0 in London
2024-25	Last 16	eliminated by FK Bodø/Glimt 0–3 in Bodø, 2–1 in Piraeus
UEFA Conference League
2023–24	Winners	defeated Fiorentina 1–0 in the final of Athens
Balkans Cup
1961–63	Winners	won against Levski Sofia 1–0 in Piraeus, 0–1 in Sofia, 1–0 in Istanbul

=== UEFA ranking ===
Current ranking.

As of 22 October 2026

Rank	Team	Points
26	(Italy) AC Milan	62.000
27	(Turkey) Fenerbahçe	60.750
28	(Greece) Olympiacos	60.250
29	(Ukraine) Shakhtar Donetsk	59.250
30	(Germany) SC Freiburg	59.000

5-year club ranking at the end of season 2025–26

Rank	Club	Points gained in season					Total
Rank	Club	2021–22	2022–23	2023–24	2024–25	2025–26	Total
34	(Italy) Napoli	9.000	25.000	17.000	–	12.000	63.000
35	(Netherlands) AZ Alkmaar	13.000	19.000	4.000	12.500	14.375	62.875
36	(Greece) Olympiacos	8.000	3.000	17.000	18.500	15.750	62.250
37	(Germany) RB Leipzig	17.000	18.000	18.000	8.000	–	61.000
38	(Scotland) Rangers	19.000	4.000	14.000	19.250	3.000	59.250

10-year club ranking at the end of season 2025–26

Rank	Club	Points gained in season										Total
Rank	Club	2016–17	2017–18	2018–19	2019–20	2020–21	2021–22	2022–23	2023–24	2024–25	2025–26	Total
28	(Germany) Eintracht Frankfurt	–	–	24.000	9.000	–	28.000	16.000	7.000	23.000	9.000	116.000
29	(Belgium) Club Brugge	4.000	1.500	11.000	8.000	11.000	7.000	17.000	21.000	15.750	14.500	110.750
30	(Greece) Olympiacos	10.000	5.000	8.000	10.000	10.000	8.000	3.000	17.000	18.500	15.750	105.250
31	(Austria) Red Bull Salzburg	5.000	21.000	16.000	10.000	7.000	17.000	9.000	7.000	8.000	4.000	104.000
32	(Italy) Lazio	–	17.000	6.000	4.000	17.000	9.000	6.000	18.000	26.000	–	103.000

== Honours ==
Olympiacos F.C. honours
Type	Competition	Titles	Seasons
Continental	UEFA Europa Conference League	1^{s}	2023–24
Continental	Balkans Cup	1	1962–63
Continental (Youth Team)	UEFA Youth League	1	2023–24
National	Super League Greece	48	1930–31, 1932–33, 1933–34, 1935–36, 1936–37, 1937–38, 1946–47, 1947–48, 1950–51, 1953–54, 1954–55, 1955–56, 1956–57, 1957–58, 1958–59, 1965–66, 1966–67, 1972–73, 1973–74, 1974–75, 1979–80, 1980–81, 1981–82, 1982–83, 1986–87, 1996–97, 1997–98, 1998–99, 1999–2000, 2000–01, 2001–02, 2002–03, 2004–05, 2005–06, 2006–07, 2007–08, 2008–09, 2010–11, 2011–12, 2012–13, 2013–14, 2014–15, 2015–16, 2016–17, 2019–20, 2020–21, 2021–22, 2024–25
National	Greek Cup	29	1946–47, 1950–51, 1951–52, 1952–53, 1953–54, 1956–57, 1957–58, 1958–59, 1959–60, 1960–61, 1962–63, 1964–65, 1967–68, 1970–71, 1972–73, 1974–75, 1980–81, 1989–90, 1991–92, 1998–99, 2004–05, 2005–06, 2007–08, 2008–09, 2011–12, 2012–13, 2014–15, 2019–20, 2024–25
National	Greek Super Cup	5	1980, 1987, 1992, 2007, 2025
Regional	Southern Greece Championship	2	1933, 1934
Regional	Piraeus FCA Championship	25	1925, 1926, 1927, 1929, 1930, 1931, 1934, 1935, 1937, 1938, 1940, 1946, 1947, 1948, 1949, 1950, 1951, 1952, 1953, 1954, 1955, 1956, 1957, 1958, 1959

- record
- Doubles
  - Winners (19) (record): 1946–47, 1950–51, 1953–54, 1956–57, 1957–58, 1958–59, 1972–73, 1974–75, 1980–81, 1998–99, 2004–05, 2005–06, 2007–08, 2008–09, 2011–12, 2012–13, 2014–15, 2019–20, 2024–25
- Domestic treble
  - Winners (3) (record): 1980, 2007, 2025

=== Minor & Unofficial Titles ===
- Easter Cup
  - Winners (11) (record): 1928, 1929, 1934, 1936, 1943, 1945, 1946, 1949, 1951, 1953, 1959
- Christmas Cup
  - Winners (11) (record): 1943, 1948, 1951, 1952, 1953, 1954, 1956, 1959, 1960, 1961, 1962
- Greater Greece Cup
  - Winners (3) (record): 1969, 1972, 1976

=== Friendly Tournaments ===
- 2 September Cups
- 1 Annual New York Multi-National Tournament
- 1 Dimitrios Aliprantis Cup
- 1 K. Karamanlis Cup
- 1 Solidarity Cup
- 1 Queen Frederica of Greece Cup
- 1 SEGAS Cup
- 1 Piraeus Mayor Cup

== Players ==
=== Current squad ===
As of 20 September 2026

Note: Flags indicate national team as defined under FIFA eligibility rules; some limited exceptions apply. Players may hold more than one non-FIFA nationality.

No.	Pos.	Nation	Player
1	GK	GER	Stefan Ortega
2	DF	GRE	Manolis Saliakas
4	DF	BIH	Zinedin Smajlović
5	DF	ITA	Lorenzo Pirola
6	DF	ANG	David Carmo
7	MF	GRE	Kostas Fortounis (vice-captain)
8	MF	POR	Gustavo Sá
9	FW	MAR	Ayoub El Kaabi (third-captain)
10	MF	POR	Gelson Martins
11	FW	UKR	Roman Yaremchuk
15	MF	COL	Gustavo Puerta
16	MF	ARG	Lorenzo Scipioni
17	MF	JAM	Leon Bailey
19	MF	SUI	Remo Freuler
20	MF	POR	Jota Silva

No.	Pos.	Nation	Player
21	MF	GRE	Theofanis Bakoulas
22	MF	POR	Chiquinho
27	DF	NOR	Marcus Pedersen
31	GK	MNE	Balša Popović
32	MF	ARG	Santiago Hezze
34	FW	MEX	Armando González
45	DF	GRE	Panagiotis Retsos (captain)
70	DF	NGR	Bruno Onyemaechi
71	DF	ARM	Nair Tiknizyan
73	MF	ESP	Joel Roca
90	FW	BRA	Clayton
91	GK	GRE	Dimitrios Stournaras
97	MF	TUR	Yusuf Yazıcı
99	FW	CHA	Marius Mouandilmadji

=== Out on loan ===
Note: Flags indicate national team as defined under FIFA eligibility rules; some limited exceptions apply. Players may hold more than one non-FIFA nationality.

No.	Pos.	Nation	Player
—	DF	BRA	Gustavo Mancha (at Rio Ave until 30 June 2027)
—	DF	ARG	Pablo Maffeo (at Valencia until 30 June 2027)
—	DF	GRE	Nikos Athanasiou (at OFI until 30 June 2027)

No.	Pos.	Nation	Player
—	MF	POR	Diogo Nascimento (at Rio Ave until 30 June 2027)
—	MF	GRE	Antonis Papakanellos (at Asteras Tripolis until 30 June 2027)
—	MF	GRE	Stavros Pnevmonidis (at Atromitos until 30 June 2027)

== In popular culture ==
As Greece's most successful club and one of the most successful in Europe, Olympiacos has also had a great impact on the country's popular culture. There is a museum centered on Olympiacos' history.

A number of documentaries have been produced about Olympiacos' achievements. Most recently, the documentary Olympiacos, the Legend chronicles the team's European achievements, which included being the first European club ever to win two UEFA trophies in a single season.

== Personnel ==
=== Coaching staff ===
Position	Staff
Head coach	(Spain) Imanol Alguacil
Assistant head coach	(Spain) Arkaitz Lakanbra
Assistant coach	(Greece) Avraam Papadopoulos
Goalkeeper coach	(Spain) Mikel Saizar
Assistant Goalkeeper coach	(Greece) Makis Veniamin
Fitness coach	(Greece) Christos Mourikis
Fitness coach	(Spain) Cédric Thyus
Rehabilitation trainer	(Greece) Kostas Liougkos
Analysts	(Greece) Giannis Vogiatzakis
Analysts	(Greece) Iosif Loukas
Analysts	(Spain) Ibon Peñagarikano

=== Technical staff ===
Position	Staff
Team manager	(Greece) Thodoris Kokkinakis
Liaison officers	(Greece) Spiros Bitsakis
Liaison officers	(Greece) Ilias Misailidis
Kit takers	(Greece) Dimos Meris
Kit takers	(Greece) Panagiotis Papadimitriou
Kit takers	(Greece) Konstantinos Roussos
Interpreter	(Greece) Marina Tsali

=== Scouting staff ===
Position	Staff
Chief Scout	(Greece) Giannis Theodorou
Scouts	(Greece) Simos Havos

=== Medical staff ===
Position	Staff
Club doctor	(Greece) Christos Theos
Nutritionist	(Portugal) Hernani Gomes
Physiotherapists	(Greece) Nikos Lykouresis
Physiotherapists	(Greece) Stavros Petrocheilos
Physiotherapists	(Greece) Spyros Kavvadias
Physiotherapists	(Greece) Dionysios Papadopoulos

== Management ==
Position	Staff
President	(Greece) Evangelos Marinakis
Vice Presidents	(Greece) Ioannis Moralis
Vice Presidents	(Greece) Michalis Kountouris
Vice President Managing Director	(Greece) Dimitris Agrafiotis
Vice President General Director	(Greece) Kostas Karapapas
Members	(Greece) Ioannis Vrentzos
Members	(Greece) Konstantinos Barbis
Members	(Greece) Christos Mistriotis
Members	(Greece) Andreas Nasikas
Members	(Greece) Giorgos Pavlou
Sports director	(Spain) Antonio Cordón
Strategic advisor	(France) Christian Karembeu

=== Former presidents ===
Years	Name
1925–1950	Michalis Manouskos
1950–1954	Thanasis Mermigas
1954–1967	Giorgos Andrianopoulos
1967–1975	Nikos Goulandris
1975–1978	Kostas Thanopoulos
1978–1987	Stavros Daifas
1987–1988	Giorgos Koskotas
1988–1992	Argyris Saliarelis
1992–1993	Stavros Daifas
1993–2010	Sokratis Kokkalis
2010–2017	Evangelos Marinakis
2017–2021	Giannis Moralis
2021–present	Evangelos Marinakis

== Statistics ==
=== Greek Championship records ===
Outline	Record
Champions in a row	7 (1997–2003, 2011–2017)
Undefeated Champions	6 (1936–37, 1937–38, 1947–48, 1950–51, 1953–54, 1954–55)
Series of five or more consecutive Championships	5 (World Record) (1937–38–1937–38, 1953–54–1958–59, 1996–97–2002–03, 2004–05–2008–09, 2010–11–2016–17)
Record win	11–0 (vs Fostiras, 1973–74)
Most wins in a season	30 (1999–2000)
Most goals scored in a season	102 (1973–74)
Fewest goals conceded in a season	9 (2019–20)
Longest sequence of wins	17 (1st day of 2015–16 – 17th day of 2015–16)
Longest sequence of unbeaten matches	58 (3rd matchday of 1972–73 – 27th matchday of 1973–74)

=== Top scorers ===
Olympiacos' top scorers in all official competitions:

Classification	Player	Total goals
1	Giorgos Sideris	298
2	Nikos Anastopoulos	197
3	Alexis Alexandris	170
4	Predrag Đorđević	158
5	Nikos Gioutsos	128
6	Michalis Kritikopoulos	102
7	Elias Yfantis	101
8	Giannis Vazos	98
9	Giovanni	97
10	Youssef El-Arabi	94
11	Kostas Fortounis	94

Olympiacos' top scorers in the Greek championship only:

Classification	Player	Total goals
1	Giorgos Sideris	224
2	Nikos Anastopoulos	144
3	Alexis Alexandris	127
4	Predrag Đorđević	126
5	Nikos Gioutsos	98
6	Michalis Kritikopoulos	83
7	Kostas Fortounis	75
8	Aris Papazoglou	72
9	Youssef El-Arabi	68
10	Panagiotis Tsalouchidis	65

Olympiacos' top scorers in European competitions:

Classification	Player	Total goals
1	Ayoub El Kaabi	26
2	Youssef El-Arabi	20
3	Kostas Mitroglou	15
4	Predrag Đorđević	15
5	Nikos Anastopoulos	14
6	Kostas Fortounis	13

== See also ==
- Olympiacos B
- Olympiacos CFP
- Olympiacos F.C. Youth Academy
- European Club Association
- List of Olympiacos F.C. players
- Olympiacos F.C. in European football
- Olympiacos F.C. Women
