= 1999–2000 Olympiacos F.C. season =

Olympiacos
1999–2000 season
- Chairman: Sokratis Kokkalis
- Manager: Dušan Bajević (until 11 November 1999); Alberto Bigon (until 10 April 2000); Ioannis Matzourakis (until 30 June 2000)
- Stadium: Athens Olympic Stadium
- Alpha Ethniki: 1st
- Greek Cup: Quarter-finals
- Champions League: Group stage
- UEFA Cup: Third round
- Top goalscorer: League: Alexis Alexandris (15); All: Alexis Alexandris (18)
Home colours	Away colours	Third colours

The 1999–00 season was Olympiacos's 41st consecutive season in the Alpha Ethniki and their 74th year in existence. The club were played their 3rd consecutive season in the UEFA Champions League. In the beginning of the summertime Olympiacos named Italian Alberto Bigon coach.

== Players ==
=== First-team squad ===
Squad at end of season

Note: Flags indicate national team as defined under FIFA eligibility rules; some limited exceptions apply. Players may hold more than one non-FIFA nationality.

No.	Pos.	Nation	Player
1	GK	GRE	Kyriakos Tohouroglou
33	DF	CYP	Savvas Poursaitidis
3	DF	GRE	Kiriakos Karataidis
4	MF	GRE	Andreas Niniadis
5	DF	GRE	Georgios Amanatidis
7	MF	GRE	Stelios Giannakopoulos
8	FW	BRA	Luciano de Souza
9	FW	CYP	Siniša Gogić
10	FW	BRA	Giovanni
11	MF	YUG	Predrag Đorđević
14	DF	GRE	Dimitris Mavrogenidis
34	DF	GRE	Paraskevas Antzas
16	FW	GRE	Lambros Choutos

No.	Pos.	Nation	Player
18	MF	GRE	Vassilis Karapialis
20	MF	GRE	Stelios Sfakianakis
24	FW	GHA	Peter Ofori-Quaye
25	MF	SVN	Zlatko Zahovič
22	GK	GRE	Kleopas Giannou
30	FW	GRE	Alekos Alexandris
31	GK	GRE	Dimitrios Eleftheropoulos
32	DF	GRE	Georgios Anatolakis
23	FW	GRE	Dimitris Kalikas
17	MF	GRE	Petros Passalis
15	DF	GRE	Stavros Tziortziopoulos
12	DF	GHA	Kofi Amponsah

== Competitions ==
=== Alpha Ethniki ===
==== League table ====
Pos	Team	Pld	W	D	L	GF	GA	GD	Pts	Qualification or relegation
1	Olympiacos (C)	34	30	2	2	86	18	+68	92	Qualification for Champions League first group stage
2	Panathinaikos	34	28	4	2	92	24	+68	88	Qualification for Champions League third qualifying round
3	AEK Athens	34	20	6	8	69	39	+30	66	Qualification for UEFA Cup first round
4	OFI	34	18	9	7	60	44	+16	63	Qualification for UEFA Cup first round
5	PAOK	34	15	10	9	64	44	+20	55	Qualification for UEFA Cup first round

Source: Galanis Sports Data
Rules for classification: 1) Points; 2) Head-to-head points; 3) Head-to-head goal difference; 4) Goal difference; 5) Goals scored; 6) Goals against; 7) Play-offs (neutral ground); 8) Draw.
(Note: Criterion 7 is only used if needed to decide champion, teams for relegation or teams for UEFA competitions).
(C) Champions

==== Results summary ====
Overall								Home						Away					
Pld	W	D	L	GF	GA	GD	Pts	W	D	L	GF	GA	GD	W	D	L	GF	GA	GD
34	30	2	2	86	18	+68	92	16	1	0	54	9	+45	14	1	2	32	9	+23

Last updated: 28 May 2000.
Source: Competitive matches

==== Results by round ====
Round	1	2	3	4	5	6	7	8	9	10	11	12	13	14	15	16	17	18	19	20	21	22	23	24	25	26	27	28	29	30	31	32	33	34
Ground	A	H	A	A	H	A	H	A	H	A	H	H	A	H	A	H	A	H	A	H	H	A	H	A	H	A	H	A	A	H	A	H	A	H
Result	W	W	W	W	W	W	W	L	W	W	W	W	W	W	L	W	W	W	W	W	W	W	W	W	D	D	W	W	W	W	W	W	W	W
Position	1	1	1	1	1	1	1	2	1	1	1	1	1	1	1	1	1	1	1	1	1	1	1	1	1	1	1	1	1	1	1	1	1	1

Source: Competitive matches
A = Away; H = Home; W = Win; D = Draw; L = Loss

==== Matches ====
18 September 1999 1	Proodeftiki	0–3	Olympiacos	Piraeus
			Alexandris 30'; Gogić 40'; Giannakopoulos 90'	Stadium: Korydallos Municipal Stadium; Attendance: 5,821; Referee: Paraskevas Chelis

26 September 1999 2	Olympiacos	5–0	Panionios	Marousi
	Ofori-Quaye 32'; Mitsiopoulos 38' (o.g.); Karapialis 45', 90+2', 90+4'			Stadium: Olympic Stadium; Attendance: 9,613; Referee: Giorgos Bikas

3 October 1999 3	Apollon Athens	0–1	Olympiacos	Rizoupoli
			Giovanni 66'	Stadium: Rizoupoli Stadium; Attendance: 5,420; Referee: Christos Daglis

15 October 1999 4	Kavala	0–5	Olympiacos	Kavala
			Karapialis 32'; Giannakopoulos 63', 76'; Giovanni 68'; Zahovič 77'	Stadium: Kavala National Stadium; Attendance: 2,649; Referee: Athanassios Briakos

23 October 1999 5	Olympiacos	3–1	Trikala	Marousi
	Niniadis 26'; Karapialis 77'; Giannakopoulos 83'		Diach 71' (pen.)	Stadium: Olympic Stadium; Attendance: Behind closed doors Referee: Giorgos Fasolis

8 November 1999 7	Olympiacos	4–1	PAOK	Marousi
	Giannakopoulos 7'; Niniadis 25'; Amanatidis 31'; Giovanni 45+1'		Frantzeskos 76'	Stadium: Olympic Stadium; Attendance: 11,977; Referee: Georgios Tsagarakis

15 November 1999 6	AEK Athens	0–2	Olympiacos	Nea Filadelfeia
			Đorđević 74' (pen.); Giovanni 90+2'	Stadium: Nikos Goumas Stadium; Attendance: Behind closed doors Referee: Vangelis Dimitropoulos

21 November 1999 8	Panathinaikos	2–0	Olympiacos	Marousi
	Olivares 59'; Warzycha 64'			Stadium: Olympic Stadium; Attendance: 30,770; Referee: Georgios Tsagarakis

29 November 1999 9	Olympiacos	5–0	Ethnikos Asteras	Marousi
	Đorđević 24'; Giovanni 48' (pen.); Antzas 64'; Giannakopoulos 73'; Luciano 82'			Stadium: Olympic Stadium; Attendance: 30,770; Referee: Georgios Tsagarakis

4 December 1999 10	Iraklis	3–4	Olympiacos	Thessaloniki
	Debbah 41', 45'; Xenidis 51'		Velis 9' (o.g.); Giannakopoulos 27', 36'; Giovanni 39'	Stadium: Kaftanzoglio Stadium; Attendance: 7,224; Referee: Panagiotis Nikou

12 December 1999 11	Olympiacos	2–1	Paniliakos	Marousi
	Alexandris 28', 76'		Ziakas 30'	Stadium: Olympic Stadium; Attendance: 9,292; Referee: Georgios Psychomanis

22 December 1999 12	Olympiacos	4–1	Kalamata	Marousi
	Alexandris 28'; Đorđević 44' (pen.), 85'; Amanatidis 66'		Gerônimo 23'	Stadium: Olympic Stadium; Attendance: 3,126; Referee: Filippos Dovas

29 December 1999 13	Ionikos	1–2	Olympiacos	Piraeus
	Muchotrigo 53'		Đorđević 80' (pen.); Alexandris 90'	Stadium: Neapoli Stadium; Attendance: 2,895; Referee: Filippos Dovas

9 January 2000 14	Olympiacos	2–0	Aris	Marousi
	Gogić 86'; Đorđević 90' (pen.)			Stadium: Olympic Stadium; Attendance: 12,988; Referee: Athanassios Briakos

16 January 2000 15	OFI	2–1	Olympiacos	Heraklion
	Nioplias 13'; Gómez 38'		Alexandris 24'	Stadium: Theodoros Vardinogiannis Stadium; Attendance: 9,214; Referee: Kostas Vallianos

23 January 2000 16	Olympiacos	3–2	Skoda Xanthi	Marousi
	Luciano 11'; Alexandris 46'; Zahovič 67'		Zouboulis 81', 90+2'	Stadium: Olympic Stadium; Attendance: 8,349; Referee: Christos Daglis

29 January 2000 17	Panachaiki	0–2	Olympiacos	Patras
			Amanatidis 63'; Zahovič 65'	Stadium: Kostas Davourlis Stadium; Attendance: 8,005; Referee: Giorgos Fasolis

7 February 2000 18	Olympiacos	4–0	Proodeftiki	Marousi
	Zahovič 10'; Alexandris 39', 68'; Đorđević 49'			Stadium: Olympic Stadium; Attendance: 9,870; Referee: Christos Daglis

13 February 2000 19	Panionios	0–1	Olympiacos	Nea Smyrni
			Zahovič 90+2'	Stadium: Nea Smyrni Stadium; Attendance: 5,493; Referee: Manolis Giannadakis

20 February 2000 20	Olympiacos	2–0	Apollon Athens	Marousi
	Alexandris 75'; Giannakopoulos 85'			Stadium: Olympic Stadium; Attendance: 9,857; Referee: Kyros Vassaras

27 February 2000 21	Olympiacos	5–0	Kavala	Marousi
	Choutos 30', 36'; Đorđević 54' (pen.); Zahovič 85'; Alexandris 90'			Stadium: Olympic Stadium; Attendance: 12,090; Referee: Georgios Psychomanis

4 March 2000 22	Trikala	0–2	Olympiacos	Trikala
			Choutos 47', 73'	Stadium: Trikala Municipal Stadium; Attendance: 8,370; Referee: Dimitris Kalivas

12 March 2000 23	Olympiacos	3–0	AEK Athens	Marousi
	Đorđević 44' (pen.), 81' (pen.); Zahovič 64'			Stadium: Olympic Stadium; Attendance: 14,121; Referee: Nikos Aggelakis

19 March 2000 24	PAOK	0–2	Olympiacos	Thessaloniki
			Choutos 49', 57'	Stadium: Toumba Stadium; Attendance: 25,500; Referee: Kostas Vallianos

26 March 2000 25	Olympiacos	2–2	Panathinaikos	Marousi
	Anatolakis 9'; Alexandris 81'		Galetto 22'; Liberopoulos 80'	Stadium: Olympic Stadium; Attendance: 50,166; Referee: Spyros Papadakos

3 April 2000 26	Ethnikos Asteras	1–1	Olympiacos	Kaisariani
	Basinas 66'		Alexandris 15'	Stadium: Michalis Kritikopoulos Stadium; Referee: Georgios Douros

12 April 2000 27	Olympiacos	1–0	Iraklis	Marousi
	Luciano 90+2'			Stadium: Olympic Stadium; Attendance: 11,944; Referee: Georgios Borovilos

16 April 2000 28	Paniliakos	0–3	Olympiacos	Pyrgos
			Niniadis 42'; Choutos 47'; Luciano 83'	Stadium: Pyrgos Stadium; Attendance: 11,944; Referee: Georgios Borovilos

23 April 2000 29	Kalamata	0–1	Olympiacos	Kalamata
			Gogić 69'	Stadium: Kalamata Municipal Stadium; Attendance: 7,385; Referee: Georgios Borovilos

3 May 2000 30	Olympiacos	2–0	Ionikos	Marousi
	Alexandris 10'; Giannakopoulos 45'			Stadium: Olympic Stadium; Attendance: 12,043; Referee: Filippos Dovas

8 May 2000 31	Aris	0–1	Olympiacos	Thessaloniki
			Đorđević 63' (pen.)	Stadium: Kleanthis Vikelidis Stadium; Attendance: 4,047; Referee: Georgios Kasnaferis

14 May 2000 32	Olympiacos	2–0	OFI	Marousi
	Đorđević 24' (pen.); Karapialis 81'			Stadium: Olympic Stadium; Attendance: 21,375; Referee: Georgios Borovilos

21 May 2000 33	Skoda Xanthi	0–1	Olympiacos	Xanthi
			Giovanni 48'	Stadium: A.O. Xanthi Stadium; Attendance: 2,800; Referee: Dimitris Pontikis

28 May 2000 34	Olympiacos	5–1	Panachaiki	Marousi
	Giovanni 17'; Alexandris 42'; Luciano 58', 71'; Gogić 86'		Katsouranis 51'	Stadium: Olympic Stadium; Attendance: 43,110; Referee: Dimitris Pontikis

=== Greek Cup ===
==== Group 7 ====
Pos	Team	Pld	W	D	L	GF	GA	GD	Pts	Qualification	OLY	PAS	XAN	NAO	EDE	AKV
1	Olympiacos	5	5	0	0	16	2	+14	15	Additional Round		2–1	—	5–0	—	2–0
2	PAS Giannina	5	4	0	1	14	3	+11	12	Additional Round	—		2–0	5–0	—	—
3	Skoda Xanthi	5	2	0	3	10	9	+1	6		1–5	—		3–0	5–0	—
4	Naoussa	5	2	0	3	4	14	−10	6		—	—	—		3–1	1–0
5	Edessaikos	5	1	0	4	4	14	−10	3		0–2	1–3	—	—		2–1
6	Apollon Krya Vrysi	5	1	0	4	3	9	−6	3		—	0–3	2–1	—	—	

Source: epo.gr

===== Matches =====
11 August 1999 1	Olympiacos	5–0	Naoussa	Marousi
	Giovanni 28', 33'; Ofori-Quaye 49'; Giannakopoulos 68'; Gogić 85'	Report (page 21)		Stadium: Olympic Stadium; Referee: Georgios Tsagarakis (Chania)

26 August 1999 2	Skoda Xanthi	1–5	Olympiacos	Xanthi
	Kyparissis 90+2'	Report (page 22)	Amanatidis 32'; Giannakopoulos 35'; Sfakianakis 57'; Gogić 79'; Alexandris 84'	Stadium: A.O. Xanthi Stadium; Attendance: 2,749; Referee: Kyros Vassaras (Thessaloniki)

29 August 1999 3	Olympiacos	2–1	PAS Giannina	Marousi
	Đorđević 7'; Giovanni 45'	Report (page 23)	Sentementes 77'	Stadium: Olympic Stadium; Attendance: 6,097; Referee: Spyros Papadakos (Laconia)

8 September 1999 4	Edessaikos	0–2	Olympiacos	Edessa
		Report (page 21)	Karapialis 37'; Sfakianakis 90'	Stadium: Municipal Stadium of Edessa; Referee: Malamas Tevekelis (Thessaloniki)

13 October 1999 5	Olympiacos	2–0	Apollon Krya Vrysi	Marousi
	Mavrogenidis 22'; Papadopoulos 40' (o.g.)	Report (page 23)		Stadium: Olympic Stadium; Referee: Giorgos Kasnaferis (Athens)

==== Additional round ====
19 December 1999	Paniliakos	0–1	Olympiacos	Pyrgos
17:00 EET		Report (page 30)	Poursanidis 49'	Stadium: Pyrgos Stadium; Attendance: 9,000; Referee: Dimitris Kalivas (Boeotia)

==== Round of 16 ====
12 January 2000	Olympiacos	2–1	PAOK	Marousi
18:30 EET	Alexandris 2'; Giannakopoulos 54'	Report (page 32)	Frousos 19'	Stadium: Olympic Stadium; Attendance: 17,317; Referee: Georgios Tsagarakis (Chania)

==== Quarter-finals ====
6 February 2000 First leg	Olympiacos	1–1	AEK Athens	Marousi
18:30 EET	Alexandris 75'	Report (page 33)	Lakis 32'	Stadium: Olympic Stadium; Attendance: 23,632; Referee: Dimitris Kalivas (Boeotia)

8 March 2000 Second leg	AEK Athens	3–0 (4–1 agg.)	Olympiacos	Nea Filadelfeia
18:30 EET	Nikolaidis 27'; Kopitsis 31'; Petkov 48'	Report (page 34)		Stadium: Nikos Goumas Stadium; Attendance: 14,400; Referee: Kyros Vassaras (Thessaloniki)

=== UEFA Champions League ===
==== Group stage ====
Pos	Team	Pld	W	D	L	GF	GA	GD	Pts	Qualification
1	(Spain) Real Madrid	6	4	1	1	15	7	+8	13	Advance to second group stage
2	(Portugal) Porto	6	4	0	2	9	6	+3	12	Advance to second group stage
3	(Greece) Olympiacos	6	2	1	3	9	12	−3	7	Transfer to UEFA Cup
4	(Norway) Molde	6	1	0	5	6	14	−8	3	

Source: UEFA

All times at CET

15 September 1999 1	Olympiacos (Greece)	3–3	(Spain) Real Madrid	Athens, Greece
20:45	Giovanni 11', 64'; Zahovič 67'	Report	Sávio 24'; Roberto Carlos 32'; Raúl 80'	Stadium: Olympic Stadium; Attendance: 70,800; Referee: Mario van der Ende (Netherlands)

21 September 1999 2	Porto (Portugal)	2–0	(Greece) Olympiacos	Porto, Portugal
20:45	Esquerdinha 6'; Jardel 47'	Report		Stadium: Estádio das Antas; Attendance: 21,500; Referee: David Elleray (England)

28 September 1999 3	Olympiacos (Greece)	3–1	(Norway) Molde	Athens, Greece
20:45	Giovanni 16', 70'; Luciano 77'	Report	Lund 58'	Stadium: Olympic Stadium; Attendance: 40,299; Referee: Ľuboš Micheľ (Slovakia)

20 October 1999 4	Molde (Norway)	3–2	(Greece) Olympiacos	Molde, Norway
20:45	Lund 54', 59'; Hestad 72'	Report	Mavrogenidis 36'; Zahovič 40'	Stadium: Molde Stadium; Attendance: 10,230; Referee: Ryszard Wójcik (Poland)

26 October 1999 5	Real Madrid (Spain)	3–0	(Greece) Olympiacos	Madrid, Spain
20:45	Raúl 21'; Morientes 64'; Roberto Carlos 83'	Report		Stadium: Santiago Bernabéu Stadium; Attendance: 23,000; Referee: Markus Merk (Germany)

3 November 1999 6	Olympiacos (Greece)	1–0	(Portugal) Porto	Athens, Greece
20:45	Giannakopoulos 56'	Report		Stadium: Olympic Stadium; Attendance: 24,131; Referee: Kim Milton Nielsen (Denmark)

=== UEFA Cup ===
==== Third round ====
All times at CET

25 November 1999 First leg	Olympiacos (Greece)	1–3	(Italy) Juventus	Athens, Greece
	Giannakopoulos 15'	Report	Tudor 27'; Kovačević 67'; Inzaghi 88'	Stadium: Olympic Stadium; Attendance: 30,000; Referee: Rune Pedersen (Norway)

7 December 1999 Second leg	Juventus (Italy)	1–2 (4–3 agg.)	(Greece) Olympiacos	Palermo, Italy
	Kovačević 1'	Report	Đorđević 38', 82' (pen.)	Stadium: Stadio La Favorita; Attendance: 22,000; Referee: Juan Fernández Marin (Spain)

== Top scorer ==
- (Greece) Alexandros Alexandris: 15 goals

== Team kit ==
Supplier: Puma
Sponsor(s): Aspis Pronoia

Home	Away	Third

Source: Olympiacos FC
