= 2002–03 Olympiacos F.C. season =

Olympiacos
2002–03 season
- Chairman: Sokratis Kokkalis
- Manager: Takis Lemonis
- Stadium: Rizoupoli Stadium
- Alpha Ethniki: 1st (champions)
- Greek Cup: Quarter-finals
- Champions League: Group stage
- Top goalscorer: League: Stelios Giannakopoulos (15); All: Predrag Đorđević (18)
- Highest home attendance: 40,500 vs Bayer Leverkusen (4 October 2002)
Home colours	Away colours

The 2002–03 season was Olympiacos's 44th consecutive season in the Alpha Ethniki and their 77th year in existence. The club were played their 6th consecutive season in the UEFA Champions League. In the beginning of the summertime Olympiacos named Greek Takis Lemonis coach.

== Players ==
=== First-team squad ===
Squad at end of season

Note: Flags indicate national team as defined under FIFA eligibility rules; some limited exceptions apply. Players may hold more than one non-FIFA nationality.

No.	Pos.	Nation	Player
2	DF	GRE	Christos Patsatzoglou
3	DF	GRE	Stelios Venetidis
4	DF	COL	Jorge Bermúdez
5	DF	GRE	Georgios Amanatidis
6	MF	GRE	Ilias Poursanidis
7	MF	GRE	Stelios Giannakopoulos
8	MF	FRA	Christian Karembeu
9	FW	GRE	Lambros Choutos
10	FW	BRA	Giovanni
11	MF	SCG	Predrag Đorđević
12	DF	SLO	Džoni Novak
13	MF	BRA	Zé Elias
14	DF	GRE	Dimitris Mavrogenidis
15	DF	BRA	Edu Dracena
16	FW	MEX	Nery Castillo
17	FW	GHA	Peter Ofori-Quaye

No.	Pos.	Nation	Player
18	DF	GRE	Paraskevas Antzas
19	DF	GRE	Athanasios Kostoulas
20	MF	SWE	Par Zetterberg
21	MF	GRE	Andreas Niniadis
22	GK	GRE	Fanis Katergiannakis
23	DF	GRE	Christos Kontis
27	MF	GRE	Konstantinos Mendrinos
29	GK	GRE	Konstantinos Dougeroglou
30	FW	GRE	Alexis Alexandris
31	GK	GRE	Dimitrios Eleftheropoulos
32	DF	GRE	Georgios Anatolakis
33	DF	GRE	Christos Lisgaras
34	GK	GRE	Kleopas Giannou
44	DF	GRE	Efthymis Kouloucheris
77	MF	GRE	Antonis Vlachos
85	GK	GRE	Georgios Sapounas

== Competitions ==
=== Alpha Ethniki ===
==== League table ====
Pos	Team	Pld	W	D	L	GF	GA	GD	Pts	Qualification or relegation
1	Olympiacos (C)	30	21	7	2	75	21	+54	70 (Note: Head-to-head points (goal difference): Olympiacos 3 (+2), Panathinaikos 3 (-2).)	Qualification for Champions League group stage
2	Panathinaikos	30	22	4	4	50	19	+31	70	Qualification for Champions League group stage
3	AEK Athens	30	21	5	4	74	29	+45	68	Qualification for Champions League third qualifying round
4	PAOK	30	16	5	9	59	38	+21	53 (Note: Head-to-head points (goal difference): PAOK 3 (+1), Panionios 3 (-1).)	Qualification for UEFA Cup first round
5	Panionios	30	15	8	7	35	25	+10	53	Qualification for UEFA Cup first round

Source: Galanis Sports Data
Rules for classification: 1) Points; 2) Head-to-head points; 3) Head-to-head goal difference; 4) Goal difference; 5) Goals scored; 6) Goals against; 7) Play-offs (neutral ground); 8) Draw.
(Note: Criterion 7 is only used if needed to decide champion, teams for relegation or teams for UEFA competitions).
(C) Champions

==== Results summary ====
Overall								Home						Away					
Pld	W	D	L	GF	GA	GD	Pts	W	D	L	GF	GA	GD	W	D	L	GF	GA	GD
30	21	7	2	75	21	+54	70	12	2	1	40	8	+32	9	5	1	35	13	+22

Last updated: 25 May 2003.
Source: Competitive matches

==== Results by round ====
Round	1	2	3	4	5	6	7	8	9	10	11	12	13	14	15	16	17	18	19	20	21	22	23	24	25	26	27	28	29	30
Ground	H	A	A	H	A	H	A	H	A	H	H	A	H	A	H	A	H	H	A	H	A	H	A	H	A	A	H	A	H	A
Result	W	W	D	W	D	D	D	W	D	W	W	W	W	L	D	W	W	W	W	W	W	L	W	W	W	D	W	W	W	W
Position	4	2	3	1	2	4	3	1	3	2	1	1	1	1	2	2	2	2	2	2	2	2	2	2	2	2	2	2	1	1

Source: Competitive matches
A = Away; H = Home; W = Win; D = Draw; L = Loss

==== Matches ====
All times at EET

25 August 2002 1	Olympiacos	1–0	Kallithea	Rizoupoli
21:00	Đorđević 54'			Stadium: Rizoupoli Stadium; Attendance: 10,001; Referee: Nikos Aggelakis

1 September 2002 2	OFI	0–1	Olympiacos	Heraklion
17:30			Giannakopoulos 74'	Stadium: Theodoros Vardinogiannis Stadium; Attendance: 7,808; Referee: Athanassios Briakos

14 September 2002 3	Iraklis	2–2	Olympiacos	Thessaloniki
21:00	Mięciel 2'; Fofonka 90+2'		Giannakopoulos 74'; Giovanni 82'	Stadium: Makedonikos Stadium; Attendance: 4,583; Referee: Ioakim Efthimiadis

21 September 2002 4	Olympiacos	4–0	Akratitos	Rizoupoli
19:00	Đorđević 25'; Zetterberg 37'; Giovanni 54'; Castillo 83'			Stadium: Rizoupoli Stadium; Attendance: 8,559; Referee: Georgios Douros

26 October 2002 5	PAOK	1–1	Olympiacos	Thessaloniki
18:00	Georgiadis 56' (pen.)		Đorđević 40' (pen.)	Stadium: Toumba Stadium; Attendance: 22,296; Referee: Georgios Douros

3 November 2002 6	Olympiacos	0–0	Proodeftiki	Rizoupoli
15:00				Stadium: Rizoupoli Stadium; Attendance: 7,248; Referee: Konstantinos Finokaliotis

9 November 2002 7	AEK Athens	1–1	Olympiacos	Nea Filadelfeia
17:00	Nikolaidis 44'		Đorđević 30'	Stadium: Nikos Goumas Stadium; Attendance: 9,039; Referee: Nikos Aggelakis

24 November 2002 8	Olympiacos	6–0	Ionikos	Rizoupoli
19:00	Đorđević 8' (pen.), 55' (pen.); Giovanni 13'; Giannakopoulos 24', 51'; Patsatzoglou 68'			Stadium: Rizoupoli Stadium; Attendance: 8,081; Referee: Christoforos Zografos

1 December 2002 9	Aris	0–0	Olympiacos	Thessaloniki
17:00				Stadium: Kleanthis Vikelidis Stadium; Attendance: 8,790; Referee: Ioakim Efthimiadis

8 December 2002 10	Olympiacos	7–0	Panachaiki	Rizoupoli
17:00	Patsatzoglou 12'; Zé Elias 24'; Karembeu 25'; Giannakopoulos 47'; Alexandris 69'; Zetterberg 83'; Choutos 88'			Stadium: Rizoupoli Stadium; Attendance: 5,200; Referee: Fragiskos Somarakis

15 December 2002 11	Olympiacos	3–0	Panionios	Rizoupoli
17:00	Giovanni 13'; Giannakopoulos 23'; Alexandris 82'			Stadium: Rizoupoli Stadium; Attendance: 10,204; Referee: Giannis Kaminaris

22 December 2002 12	Egaleo	0–2	Olympiacos	Aigaleo
17:00			Patsatzoglou 39'; Choutos 88'	Stadium: Stavros Mavrothalassitis Stadium; Attendance: 3,092; Referee: Athanassios Briakos

5 January 2003 13	Olympiacos	2–1	PAS Giannina	Rizoupoli
17:00	Đorđević 29' (pen.); Antzas 51'		Kostoulas 67' (o.g.)	Stadium: Rizoupoli Stadium; Attendance: 11,041; Referee: Nikos Aggelakis

12 January 2003 14	Panathinaikos	3–2	Olympiacos	Ampelokipoi
19:00	Olisadebe 18'; Basinas 72'; Kolkka 77'		Henriksen 9' (o.g.); Kyrgiakos 55' (o.g.)	Stadium: Leoforos Alexandras Stadium; Attendance: 13,171; Referee: Kyros Vassaras

19 January 2003 15	Olympiacos	1–1	Skoda Xanthi	Nea Filadelfeia
17:00	Giannakopoulos 73'		Sfakianakis 87'	Stadium: Nikos Goumas Stadium; Attendance: 10,345; Referee: Nikos Aggelakis

26 January 2003 16	Kallithea	1–4	Olympiacos	Kallithea
17:00	Koça 9'		Giannakopoulos 29', 48', 55'; Choutos 58'	Stadium: Grigoris Lambrakis Stadium; Attendance: 2,383; Referee: Avraam Kemparidis

1 February 2003 17	Olympiacos	1–0	OFI	Rizoupoli
17:00	Giannakopoulos 73'			Stadium: Rizoupoli Stadium; Attendance: 7,304; Referee: Nikos Aggelakis

9 February 2003 18	Olympiacos	2–1	Iraklis	Rizoupoli
17:00	Đorđević 37'; Choutos 82'		Fofonka 57'	Stadium: Rizoupoli Stadium; Attendance: 3,624; Referee: Iraklis Tsikinis

16 February 2003 19	Akratitos	2–5	Olympiacos	Ano Liosia
19:00	Iliopoulos 3'; Iordanidis 80'		Giovanni 41', 70', 82'; Ofori-Quaye 74'; Alexandris 87'	Stadium: Giannis Pathiakakis Stadium; Attendance: 2,013; Referee: Ioannis Spiropoulos

23 February 2003 20	Olympiacos	4–3	PAOK	Rizoupoli
20:00	Zé Elias 4'; Đorđević 17'; Giovanni 50'; Choutos 51'		Kafes 27', 58', 63'	Stadium: Rizoupoli Stadium; Attendance: 9,518; Referee: Konstantinos Finokaliotis

2 March 2003 21	Proodeftiki	1–3	Olympiacos	Piraeus
19:00	Tatsis 82'		Castillo 19'; Ofori-Quaye 80', 83'	Stadium: Korydallos Municipal Stadium; Attendance: 3,127; Referee: Nikos Aggelakis

9 March 2003 22	Olympiacos	1–2	AEK Athens	Rizoupoli
19:00	Giannakopoulos 70'		Nikolaidis 20'; Katsouranis 90+4'	Stadium: Rizoupoli Stadium; Attendance: 9,563; Referee: Makis Efthimiadi

16 March 2003 23	Ionikos	0–2	Olympiacos	Piraeus
19:00			Amanatidis 34'; Ofori-Quaye 69'	Stadium: Neapoli Stadium; Attendance: 3,455; Referee: Charalampos Karatzas

23 March 2003 24	Olympiacos	1–0	Aris	Rizoupoli
17:15	Đorđević 49' (pen.)			Stadium: Rizoupoli Stadium; Attendance: 5,365; Referee: Christoforos Zografos

6 April 2003 25	Panachaiki	1–4	Olympiacos	Patras
17:30	Skarmoutsos 30'		Ofori-Quaye 61'; Đorđević 70'; Zetterberg 86'; Giovanni 90'	Stadium: Kostas Davourlis Stadium; Attendance: 6,498; Referee: Fragiskos Somarakis

13 April 2003 26	Panionios	0–0	Olympiacos	Nea Smyrni
17:45				Stadium: Nea Smyrni Stadium; Attendance: 8,927; Referee: Georgios Douros

20 April 2003 27	Olympiacos	4–0	Egaleo	Rizoupoli
17:30	Choutos 6', 15', 54'; Đorđević 29'			Stadium: Rizoupoli Stadium; Attendance: 4,286; Referee: Georgios Borovilos

4 May 2003 28	PAS Giannina	0–3	Olympiacos	Ioannina
18:00			Đorđević 5', 19'; Karembeu 74'	Stadium: Zosimades Stadium; Attendance: 5,070; Referee: Dimitrios Takidis

11 May 2003 29	Olympiacos	3–0	Panathinaikos	Rizoupoli
20:00	Giovanni 3'; Giannakopoulos 15', 47'			Stadium: Rizoupoli Stadium; Attendance: 10,825; Referee: Georgios Borovilos

25 May 2003 30	Skoda Xanthi	1–5	Olympiacos	Xanthi
18:30	Šikov 18'		Choutos 4', 25'; Giannakopoulos 45'; Alexandris 68'; Castillo 85'	Stadium: A.O. Xanthi Stadium; Attendance: 4,951; Referee: Iraklis Tsikinis

=== Greek Cup ===
==== First round ====
9 August 2002 First leg	Fostiras	0–2	Olympiacos	Tavros
		Report (page 6)	Niniadis 40'; Alexandris 56'	Stadium: Tavros Stadium; Referee: Charalampos Karatzas (Euboea)

21 August 2002 Second leg	Olympiacos	2–1 (4–1 agg.)	Fostiras	Rizoupoli
	Choutos 72'; Zetterberg 81' (pen.)	Report (page 12)	Moutas 19'	Stadium: Rizoupoli Stadium; Referee: Charalampos Patras (Corinthia)

==== Second round ====
6 October 2002 First leg	Kallithea	1–4	Olympiacos	Kallithea
16:00 EEST	Gekas 87'	Report (page 14)	Zetterberg 60'; Dracena 74'; Giovanni 77'; Alexandris 79'	Stadium: Grigoris Lamprakis Stadium; Attendance: 1,621; Referee: Iraklis Tsikinis (Messenia)

6 November 2002 Second leg	Olympiacos	0–1 (4–2 agg.)	Kallithea	Rizoupoli
15:00 EET		Report (page 16)	Tsiblidis 81'	Stadium: Rizoupoli Stadium; Attendance: 967; Referee: Vasilis Terovitsas (Aetoloacarnania)

==== Round of 16 ====
4 December 2002 First leg	Panachaiki	0–2	Olympiacos	Patras
19:00 EET		Report (page 18)	Castillo 68'; Choutos 84'	Stadium: Kostas Davourlis Stadium; Attendance: 1,101; Referee: Thanasis Briakos (Epirus)

22 January 2003 Second leg	Olympiacos	0–0 (2–0 agg.)	Panachaiki	Rizoupoli
19:30 EET		Report (page 20)		Stadium: Rizoupoli Stadium; Attendance: 1,618; Referee: Charalampos Karatzas (Euboea)

==== Quarter-finals ====
26 February 2003 First leg	PAOK	3–1	Olympiacos	Thessaloniki
19:00 EET	Georgiadis 10'; Markos 31'; Okkas 86'	Report (page 21)	Giannakopoulos 44' (pen.)	Stadium: Toumba Stadium; Attendance: 17,647; Referee: Giorgos Tsaggarakis (Chania)

12 March 2003 Second leg	Olympiacos	1–2 (2–5 agg.)	PAOK	Rizoupoli
19:00 EET	Choutos 76'	Report (page 22)	Georgiadis 30'; Okkas 32'	Stadium: Rizoupoli Stadium; Attendance: 11,466; Referee: Giorgos Douros (Corinthia)

=== UEFA Champions League ===
==== Group stage ====
Pos	Team	Pld	W	D	L	GF	GA	GD	Pts	Qualification
1	(England) Manchester United	6	5	0	1	16	8	+8	15	Advance to second group stage
2	(Germany) Bayer Leverkusen	6	3	0	3	9	11	−2	9	Advance to second group stage
3	(Israel) Maccabi Haifa	6	2	1	3	12	12	0	7	Transfer to UEFA Cup
4	(Greece) Olympiacos	6	1	1	4	11	17	−6	4	

Source: RSSSF

All times at CET

18 September 2002 1	Olympiacos (Greece)	6–2	(Germany) Bayer Leverkusen	Athens, Greece
20:45	Kleine 27' (o.g.); Giannakopoulos 38'; Đorđević 44', 64' (pen.), 73'; Zetterberg 87'	Report	Eleftheropoulos 22' (o.g.); Schneider 78' (pen.)	Stadium: Rizoupoli Stadium; Attendance: 12,909; Referee: Arturo Daudén Ibáñez (Spain)

24 September 2002 2	Maccabi Haifa (Israel)	3–0	(Greece) Olympiacos	Nicosia, Cyprus^{1}
20:45	Yakubu 27' (pen.), 60', 86'	Report		Stadium: GSP Stadium; Attendance: 14,893; Referee: Massimo De Santis (Italy)

1 October 2002 3	Manchester United (England)	4–0	(Greece) Olympiacos	Manchester, England
20:45	Giggs 19', 66'; Verón 26'; Solskjær 77'	Report		Stadium: Old Trafford; Attendance: 66,902; Referee: Gilles Veissiere (France)

23 October 2002 4	Olympiacos (Greece)	2–3	(England) Manchester United	Athens, Greece
20:45	Choutos 70'; Đorđević 74'	Report	Blanc 21'; Verón 59'; Scholes 84'	Stadium: Rizoupoli Stadium; Attendance: 14,000; Referee: Pierluigi Collina (Italy)

29 October 2002 5	Bayer Leverkusen (Germany)	2–0	(Greece) Olympiacos	Leverkusen, Germany
20:45	Juan 14'; Schneider 90' (pen.)	Report		Stadium: BayArena; Attendance: 22,500; Referee: Alfredo Trentalange (Italy)

13 November 2002 6	Olympiacos (Greece)	3–3	(Israel) Maccabi Haifa	Athens, Greece
20:45	Alexandris 37'; Niniadis 51'; Antzas 79'	Report	Badir 9'; Yakubu 10'; Katan 41'	Stadium: Rizoupoli Stadium; Attendance: 10,700; Referee: Rene Temmink (Netherlands)

^{1}All matches played at GSP Stadium in Nicosia, Cyprus after UEFA banned international matches from being played in Israel.

== Team kit ==
Supplier: Umbro
Sponsor(s): Siemens Mobile

Home	Away

Source: Olympiacos FC
