= 1998–99 Olympiacos F.C. season =

Olympiacos
1998–99 season
- Chairman: Sokratis Kokkalis
- Manager: Dušan Bajević
- Stadium: Athens Olympic Stadium
- Alpha Ethniki: 1st (champions)
- Greek Cup: Winners
- Champions League: Quarter-finals
- Top goalscorer: League: Grigoris Georgatos (12); All: Grigoris Georgatos (15)
Home colours	Away colours

The 1998–99 season was Olympiacos's 40th consecutive season in the Alpha Ethniki and their 74th year in existence. The club were played 2nd consecutive season in the UEFA Champions League. In the beginning of the summer Olympiacos named Bosnian Dušan Bajević coach.

== Players ==
=== First-team squad ===
Squad at end of season

Note: Flags indicate national team as defined under FIFA eligibility rules; some limited exceptions apply. Players may hold more than one non-FIFA nationality.

No.	Pos.	Nation	Player
1	GK	GRE	Kyriakos Tohouroglou
3	DF	GRE	Kiriakos Karataidis
4	MF	GRE	Andreas Niniadis
5	DF	GRE	Georgios Amanatidis
6	MF	GRE	Ilias Poursanidis
7	MF	GRE	Stelios Giannakopoulos
8	FW	BRA	Luciano de Souza
9	FW	CYP	Siniša Gogić
10	FW	YUG	Ilija Ivić
11	MF	YUG	Predrag Đorđević
12	DF	GHA	Kofi Amponsah
14	DF	GRE	Dimitris Mavrogenidis

No.	Pos.	Nation	Player
15	MF	GRE	Petros Passalis
17	MF	GRE	Stelios Sfakianakis
18	MF	GRE	Vassilis Karapialis
19	DF	GRE	Savvas Poursaitidis
21	DF	GRE	Grigorios Georgatos
22	GK	ITA	Luigi Cennamo
23	FW	GHA	Felix Aboagye
24	FW	GHA	Peter Ofori-Quaye
25	DF	GRE	Paraskevas Antzas
30	FW	GRE	Alekos Alexandris
31	GK	GRE	Dimitrios Eleftheropoulos
32	DF	GRE	Georgios Anatolakis

== Competitions ==
=== Alpha Ethniki ===
==== League table ====
Pos	Team	Pld	W	D	L	GF	GA	GD	Pts	Qualification or relegation
1	Olympiacos (C)	34	27	4	3	82	22	+60	85	Qualification for Champions League first group stage
2	AEK Athens	34	23	6	5	71	27	+44	75	Qualification for Champions League third qualifying round
3	Panathinaikos	34	23	5	6	66	36	+30	74	Qualification for UEFA Cup first round
4	PAOK	34	19	5	10	52	31	+21	62	Qualification for UEFA Cup first round
5	Ionikos	34	17	9	8	64	36	+28	60 (Note: Head-to-head record: Aris–Ionikos 1–1, Ionikos–Aris 3–0.)	Qualification for UEFA Cup first round

Source: Galanis Sports Data
Rules for classification: 1st points; 2nd head-to-head points; 3rd head-to-head goal difference; 4th decision match.
(C) Champions

==== Results summary ====
Overall								Home						Away					
Pld	W	D	L	GF	GA	GD	Pts	W	D	L	GF	GA	GD	W	D	L	GF	GA	GD
34	27	4	3	82	22	+60	85	13	4	0	44	9	+35	14	0	3	38	13	+25

Last updated: 30 May 1999.
Source: Competitive matches

==== Results by round ====
Round	1	2	3	4	5	6	7	8	9	10	11	12	13	14	15	16	17	18	19	20	21	22	23	24	25	26	27	28	29	30	31	32	33	34
Ground	A	H	A	H	A	H	A	A	H	A	H	A	H	A	H	H	A	H	A	H	A	H	A	H	H	A	H	A	H	A	H	A	A	H
Result	W	D	W	W	L	W	W	W	W	L	W	W	W	W	W	W	L	D	W	W	W	W	W	W	W	W	W	W	D	W	W	W	W	D
Position	1	6	2	1	3	3	3	3	1	3	2	1	1	1	1	1	1	1	1	1	1	1	1	1	1	1	1	1	1	1	1	1	1	1

Source: Competitive matches
A = Away; H = Home; W = Win; D = Draw; L = Loss

==== Matches ====
23 August 1998 1	Apollon Athens	2–5	Olympiacos	Rizoupoli
	Dikoumé 58'; Damigos 61'		Đorđević 21'; Ofori-Quaye 30'; Ivić 43', 44' (pen.); Karapialis 75'	Stadium: Rizoupoli Stadium; Attendance: 7,854; Referee: Georgios Douros

30 August 1998 2	Olympiacos	1–1	Panelefsiniakos	Marousi
	Giannakopoulos 30'		Koutsis 28'	Stadium: Olympic Stadium; Attendance: 15,327; Referee: Kyros Vassaras

13 September 1998 3	Veria	0–3	Olympiacos	Veria
			Karapialis 15'; Luciano 38'; Ofori-Quaye 44'	Stadium: Veria Stadium; Attendance: 3,345; Referee: Malamas Tevekelis

20 September 1998 4	Olympiacos	3–0	OFI	Marousi
	Alexandris 17'; Karapialis 19'; Gogić 24'			Stadium: Olympic Stadium; Attendance: 17,340; Referee: Georgios Fassolis

26 September 1998 5	Paniliakos	1–0	Olympiacos	Pyrgos
	Togias 54'			Stadium: Pyrgos Stadium; Attendance: 3,509; Referee: Georgios Borovilos

4 October 1998 6	Olympiacos	6–1	Proodeftiki	Marousi
	Alexandris 15', 50'; Ivić 25', 53'; Giannakopoulos 48', 56'		Zajmi 33'	Stadium: Olympic Stadium; Attendance: 16,356; Referee: Pavlos Konstantinidis

25 October 1998 7	Ethnikos Asteras	1–3	Olympiacos	Kaisariani
	Xanthis 10'		Giannakopoulos 26', 59'; Georgatos 38' (pen.)	Stadium: Michalis Kritikopoulos Stadium; Attendance: 3,540; Referee: Georgios Douros

31 October 1998 8	PAOK	1–2	Olympiacos	Thessaloniki
	Frantzeskos 72'		Ofori-Quaye 7'; Georgatos 81' (pen.)	Stadium: Toumba Stadium; Attendance: 25,858; Referee: Giannis Papapetrou
Note: Match suspended at 83rd minute when a goal scored by Taccola was disallowed. Remained as final result. PAOK were sentenced with a 3 home games stadium ban by court decision.

9 November 1998 9	Olympiacos	2–0	Ionikos	Marousi
	Ivić 35'; Georgatos 90+4'			Stadium: Olympic Stadium; Attendance: 9,285; Referee: Malamas Tevekelis

22 November 1998 10	Aris	1–0	Olympiacos	Thessaloniki
	Liolidis 59'			Stadium: Kleanthis Vikelidis Stadium; Attendance: 12,704; Referee: Georgios Fassolis

29 November 1998 11	Olympiacos	4–1	Kavala	Marousi
	Alexandris 10'; Luciano 37', 80'; Đorđević 63' (pen.)		Nasiopoulos 45'	Stadium: Olympic Stadium; Attendance: 5,115; Referee: Kostas Vallianos

5 December 1998 12	Panathinaikos	2–4	Olympiacos	Marousi
	Konstantinidis 30'; Warzycha 33'		Alexopoulos 41' (o.g.); Karapialis 52', 90+3'; Anatolakis 71'	Stadium: Olympic Stadium; Attendance: 28,683; Referee: Spiridon Papadakos

14 December 1998 13	Olympiacos	2–0	Ethnikos Piraeus	Marousi
	Gogić 65' (pen.); Đorđević 75'			Stadium: Olympic Stadium; Attendance: 4,037; Referee: Nikos Iliadis

21 December 1998 14	Iraklis	0–2	Olympiacos	Thessaloniki
			Luciano 2'; Georgatos 90+4'	Stadium: Kaftanzoglio Stadium; Attendance: 5,090; Referee: Dimitris Kalyvas

16 January 1999 15	Olympiacos	3–1	Skoda Xanthi	Marousi
	Luciano 32'; Georgatos 37'; Ivić 77'		Ba 50'	Stadium: Olympic Stadium; Attendance: 7,885; Referee: Christos Daglis

23 January 1999 16	Olympiacos	5–0	Panionios	Marousi
	Karapialis 3', 74'; Ivić 43', 49'; Đorđević 45'			Stadium: Olympic Stadium; Attendance: 13,636; Referee: Vasilios Athanasopoulos

31 January 1999 17	AEK Athens	2–0	Olympiacos	Nea Filadelfeia
	Batista 11'; Nikolaidis 45'			Stadium: Nikos Goumas Stadium; Attendance: 19,026; Referee: Malamas Tevekelis

8 February 1999 18	Olympiacos	0–0	Apollon Athens	Marousi
				Stadium: Olympic Stadium; Attendance: 5,003; Referee: Dimitris Kalyvas

14 February 1999 19	Panelefsiniakos	0–2	Olympiacos	Elefsina
			Amanatidis 29'; Đorđević 50'	Stadium: Municipal Stadium of Elefsina; Attendance: 3,008; Referee: Pavlos Konstantinidis

22 February 1999 20	Olympiacos	5–0	Veria	Marousi
	Amanatidis 33'; Georgatos 55', 81', 84' (pen.); Luciano 90'			Stadium: Olympic Stadium; Attendance: 5,990; Referee: Paraskevas Chelis

27 February 1999 21	OFI	1–2	Olympiacos	Heraklion
	Marinakis 70'		Georgatos 78' (pen.); Karapialis 90'	Stadium: Theodoros Vardinogiannis Stadium; Attendance: 8,778; Referee: Dimitris Begos

8 March 1999 22	Olympiacos	3–0	Paniliakos	Marousi
	Gogić 6'; Alexandris 38'; Đorđević 63'			Stadium: Olympic Stadium; Attendance: 8,052; Referee: Manolis Giannadakis

13 March 1999 23	Proodeftiki	0–1	Olympiacos	Piraeus
			Amanatidis 89'	Stadium: Korydallos Municipal Stadium; Attendance: 2,813; Referee: Pavlos Konstantinidis

22 March 1999 24	Olympiacos	4–2	Ethnikos Asteras	Marousi
	Niniadis 15', 56'; Georgatos 50' (pen.); Alexandris 73'		Panagiotaras 80' (pen.); Nalitzis 87'	Stadium: Olympic Stadium; Attendance: 6,112; Referee: Vaghelis Dimitropoulos

4 April 1999 25	Olympiacos	2–1	PAOK	Marousi
	Đorđević 3'; Georgatos 90+1' (pen.)		Vryzas 5'	Stadium: Olympic Stadium; Attendance: 16,582; Referee: Kostas Vallianos

18 April 1999 26	Ionikos	1–3	Olympiacos	Piraeus
	Pachatouridis 71'		Anatolakis 19'; Giannakopoulos 43'; Alexandris 90+3'	Stadium: Neapoli Stadium; Attendance: 4,517; Referee: Dimitris Begos

25 April 1999 27	Olympiacos	1–0	Aris	Marousi
	Giannakopoulos 21'			Stadium: Olympic Stadium; Attendance: 12,569; Referee: Manolis Giannadakis

2 May 1999 28	Kavala	0–2	Olympiacos	Kavala
			Alexandris 34'; Karapialis 90'	Stadium: Kavala National Stadium; Attendance: 3,505; Referee: Spiridon Papadakos

9 May 1999 29	Olympiacos	0–0	Panathinaikos	Marousi
				Stadium: Olympic Stadium; Attendance: 16,111; Referee: Georgios Tsagarakis

12 May 1999 30	Ethnikos Piraeus	0–3	Olympiacos	Piraeus
			Đorđević 26' (pen.); Alexandris 45'; Aboagye 69' (pen.)	Stadium: Karaiskakis Stadium; Attendance: 3,160; Referee: Athanassios Briakos

16 May 1999 31	Olympiacos	3–2	Iraklis	Marousi
	Gogić 21', 74'; Kyriazis 58'		Mavrogenidis 59'; Christodoulou 76'	Stadium: Olympic Stadium; Attendance: 8,723; Referee: Georgios Borovilos

19 May 1999 32	Skoda Xanthi	0–2	Olympiacos	Xanthi
			Poursaitidis 5', 81'	Stadium: A.O. Xanthi Stadium; Attendance: 2,839; Referee: Kostas Vallianos

23 May 1999 33	Panionios	1–4	Olympiacos	Nea Smyrni
	Kafalis 64'		Sfakianakis 4', 76'; Georgatos 41' (pen.); Alexandris 90'	Stadium: Nea Smyrni Stadium; Attendance: 2,559; Referee: Manolis Giannadakis

30 May 1999 34	Olympiacos	0–0	AEK Athens	Piraeus
				Stadium: Karaiskakis Stadium; Attendance: 20,333; Referee: Kostas Vallianos

=== Greek Cup ===
==== First round ====
12 November 1998	Olympiacos	4–2	Egaleo	Marousi
	Giannakopoulos 15'; Antzas 20', 21'; Đorđević 60'	Report (pages 27-28)	Katsaros 15', 41'	Stadium: Olympic Stadium; Attendance: 1,851; Referee: Thanasis Briakos (Epirus)

==== Second round ====
17 December 1998	Aris	1–3	Olympiacos	Thessaloniki
21:00 EET	Vlachoudis 68'	Report (pages 33-34)	Luciano 4'; Gogić 9', 20'	Stadium: Kleanthis Vikelidis Stadium; Attendance: 8,800; Referee: Dimitris Begos (Argolida)

==== Round of 16 ====
12 January 1999	Ionikos	4–7	Olympiacos	Piraeus
16:15 EET	Muchotrigo 15'; Daraklitsas 31'; Filis 57'; Afentoulidis 80'	Report (page 34)	Karapialis 30'; Georgatos 41'; Giannakopoulos 42', 65'; Niniadis 44'; Ivić 53'; Ofori-Quaye 41'	Stadium: Neapoli Stadium; Attendance: 2,249; Referee: Pavlos Konstantinidis (Piraeus)

==== Quarter-finals ====
11 February 1999 First leg	Olympiacos	3–1	Skoda Xanthi	Marousi
19:00 EET	Karapialis 1'; Georgatos 51' (pen.); Alexandris 76'	Report (pages 38-39)	Mansourian 51'	Stadium: Olympic Stadium; Attendance: 4,573; Referee: Nikos Aggelakis (Thessaloniki)

18 February 1999 Second leg	Skoda Xanthi	1–0 (2–3 agg.)	Olympiacos	Xanthi
16:15 EET	Kyparissis 51'	Report (page 39)		Stadium: Skoda Xanthi Arena; Attendance: 1,444; Referee: Dimitris Begos (Argolida)

==== Semi-finals ====
7 April 1999 First leg	Olympiacos	4–0	Iraklis	Marousi
16:30 EEST	Anatolakis 23'; Mavrogenidis 66'; Xenidis 70' (o.g.); Gogić 86'	Report (pages 40-41)		Stadium: Olympic Stadium; Attendance: 5,864; Referee: Dimitris Kalivas (Boeotia)

11 April 1999 Second leg	Iraklis	1–1 (1–5 agg.)	Olympiacos	Thessaloniki
19:45 EEST	Tavlaridis 47'	Report (page 41)	Gogić 29'	Stadium: Kaftanzoglio Stadium; Attendance: 1,064; Referee: Giorgos Borovilos (Arcadia)

==== Final ====
5 May 1999 Final	Olympiacos	2–0	Panathinaikos	Marousi
21:00 EEST	Mavrogenidis 54'; Ofori-Quaye 90'	Report		Stadium: Olympic Stadium; Attendance: 57,783; Referee: Giorgos Douros (Corinthia)

=== UEFA Champions League ===
==== Second qualifying round ====
All times at CET

12 August 1998 First leg	Olympiacos (Greece)	2–1	(Cyprus) Anorthosis	Athens, Greece
20:30	Giannakopoulos 11'; Luciano 32'	Report	Mihajlović 64'	Stadium: Olympic Stadium; Attendance: 28,000; Referee: René Temmink (Netherlands)

26 August 1998 Second leg	Anorthosis (Cyprus)	2–4 (3–6 agg.)	(Greece) Olympiacos	Limassol, Cyprus
20:00	Mihajlović 39'; Krčmarević 80'	Report	Georgatos 48'; Đorđević 60', 87'; Gogić 90'	Stadium: Tsirion Stadium; Attendance: 6,380; Referee: Miroslav Radoman (FR Yugoslavia)

==== Group stage ====
Pos	Team	Pld	W	D	L	GF	GA	GD	Pts	Qualification
1	(Greece) Olympiacos	6	3	2	1	8	6	+2	11	Advance to knockout stage
2	Croatia Zagreb	6	2	2	2	5	7	−2	8	
3	(Portugal) Porto	6	2	1	3	11	9	+2	7	
4	(Netherlands) Ajax	6	2	1	3	4	6	−2	7	

Source: UEFA

All times at CET

16 September 1998 1	Porto (Portugal)	2–2	(Greece) Olympiacos	Porto, Portugal
20:45	Zahovič 65'; Jardel 82'	Report	Giannakopoulos 86'; Gogić 89'	Stadium: Estádio das Antas; Attendance: 37,000; Referee: Gilles Veissière (France)

30 September 1998 2	Olympiacos (Greece)	2–0	Croatia Zagreb	Athens, Greece
20:45	Alexandris 21'; Gogić 80'	Report		Stadium: Olympic Stadium; Attendance: 60,502; Referee: David Elleray (England)

21 October 1998 3	Olympiacos (Greece)	1–0	(Netherlands) Ajax	Athens, Greece
20:45	Alexandris 38'	Report		Stadium: Olympic Stadium; Attendance: 73,250; Referee: Manuel Díaz Vega (Spain)

4 November 1998 4	Ajax (Netherlands)	2–0	(Greece) Olympiacos	Amsterdam, Netherlands
20:45	Witschge 36'; Gorré 88'	Report		Stadium: Amsterdam Arena; Attendance: 46,000; Referee: Stefano Braschi (Italy)

25 November 1998 5	Olympiacos (Greece)	2–1	(Portugal) Porto	Athens, Greece
20:45	Gogić 18'; Đorđević 55'	Report	Zahovič 76'	Stadium: Olympic Stadium; Attendance: 70,232; Referee: Hugh Dallas (Scotland)

9 December 1998 6	Croatia Zagreb	1–1	(Greece) Olympiacos	Zagreb, Croatia
20:45	Jeličić 35'	Report	Giannakopoulos 64'	Stadium: Stadion Maksimir; Attendance: 16,546; Referee: Rune Pedersen (Norway)

==== Knockout stage ====
===== Quarter-finals =====
All times at CET

3 March 1999 First leg	Juventus (Italy)	2–1	(Greece) Olympiacos	Turin, Italy
20:45	Inzaghi 38'; Conte 79'	Report	Niniadis 90+' (pen.)	Stadium: Stadio delle Alpi; Attendance: 33,871; Referee: José María García-Aranda (Spain)

17 March 1999 Second leg	Olympiacos (Greece)	1–1 (2–3 agg.)	(Italy) Juventus	Athens, Greece
20:45	Gogić 12'	Report	Conte 85'	Stadium: Olympic Stadium; Attendance: 71,022; Referee: Markus Merk (Germany)

== Team kit ==
Supplier: Puma
Sponsor(s): Ethnokarta MasterCard

Home	Away

Source: Olympiacos FC
