= Predrag Đorđević =

Serbian footballer

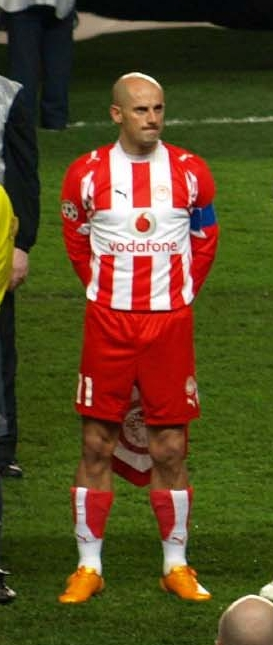
- Đorđević with Olympiacos in 2008

Personal information
- Full name: Predrag Đorđević
- Date of birth: 4 August 1972 (age 54)
- Place of birth: Kragujevac, SR Serbia, SFR Yugoslavia
- Height: 1.84 m (6 ft 0 in)
- Position: Left winger

Youth career
- Budućnost Resnik
- Radnički Kragujevac

Senior career*
Years	Team	Apps	(Gls)
1991–1992	Red Star Belgrade	5	(0)
1991–1992	→ Spartak Subotica (loan)	25	(3)
1992–1996	Paniliakos	119	(33)
1996–2009	Olympiacos	343	(126)
Total		492	(162)

International career
1998–2006	Serbia and Montenegro	37	(1)
- * Club domestic league appearances and goals

Predrag Đorđević (alternatively Djordjević, Serbian Cyrillic: Предраг Ђорђевић; born 4 August 1972) is a Serbian retired footballer.

Known for his set pieces, Đorđević played as a left midfielder for Greek club Olympiacos for 13 years, becoming Olympiacos' greatest foreign goalscorer, averaging a goal every three league matches, as well as becoming a symbol of Olympiacos' "Golden Age" of 12 championship trophies in 13 years. Đorđević is acknowledged as one of the greatest foreign players to have played in Olympiacos. Đorđević also played for the Serbia and Montenegro national team (formerly FR Yugoslavia), amassing 37 caps and 1 goal. He featured for his country in the 2006 FIFA World Cup.

== Club career ==
=== Early career ===
Having started his career in the youth section of Radnički Kragujevac, Đorđević's talent was spotted by Red Star Belgrade scouts who signed him and then loaned him to Spartak Subotica. Đorđević first moved to Greece to play for third division Paniliakos in December 1992. He was an instrumental figure as the Pyrgos club achieved successive promotions. Đorđević made his debut in the Championship on 27 August 1995.

=== Olympiacos ===
Đorđević came to Olympiacos from Paniliakos together with Stelios Giannakopoulos in 1996. Dušan Bajević signed him for Olympiacos in the summer of 1996, leaving AEK Athens The Serbian established himself as the club's dead-ball specialist, penalty taker and leader. He formed, along with Grigoris Georgatos, an outstanding left wing for Olympiacos in 1998–99 and they were the catalytic factor for Olympiacos qualifying to the UEFA Champions League 1998–99 quarter-finals. He scored 50 goals in his first five seasons at Olympiacos, all of which brought titles. Another superlative season in red and white followed in 2002–03, Đorđević scoring 14 league goals and providing 15 assists. He also hit form in the UEFA Champions League, scoring four goals in six games which included a hat-trick against Bayer Leverkusen (6–2). In 2003–04, Đorđević recorded 10 goals and 22 assists and was voted the best foreign player in the Greek ever Alpha Ethniki.

In 2004–05, he missed his club's first three Champions League matches through injury, but returned to score the winning goal against Deportivo La Coruña. He captained his side in all four UEFA Cup matches, scoring against Newcastle United. He led his side to the domestic double, appearing in 25 league matches, scoring five goals and providing six assists, before signing a two-year contract extension.

2005–06 was then 34-year-old Đorđević's most productive season, only missing one game in the Greek National A division, leading the club's scoring charts with 15 goals and reaching a total of 110 in the competition. He then appeared on next year's 2006 FIFA World Cup.

Another important period for Đorđević, the 2006–07 season, would prove record breaking. Once again, scoring crucial goals for his club, Đorđević not only continued his goal streak against Olympiacos' rivals AEK Athens, but also added another League trophy to the club's vast collection. Along with Georgios Anatolakis, this would be the captain's 10th championship, making him the only foreign player in Greece to achieve such a feat.

The 2007–08 season proved once again to be successful for the Olympiacos captain as he led a very new looking squad out to UEFA Champions League glory. Defeating the likes of Werder Bremen and Lazio, Olympiacos finished with the same points as group leaders Real Madrid and recorded their first Champions League away win in history. Đorđević played a vital role in the Greek club's entry into the knockout rounds for the second time in their history, finishing the group stages with four assists, first in the tournament. As a result of his excellent form in both Europe and the Super League Greece, Đorđević who was set to retire at the end of the 2008 season, extended his contract for another year.

On 30 March 2009, Đorđević announced that he had decided to end his career as a football player by the end of the season 2008–09, having spent 13 years of his 20 years as a professional footballer playing for Olympiacos.

== International career ==
Đorđević made his international debut for the then FR Yugoslavia against Switzerland in a September 1998 friendly match. He featured in qualifying for UEFA Euro 2000, but did not make the squad for the finals. Also appeared on the road to UEFA Euro 2004, although Serbia and Montenegro did not qualify for Portugal, and remained a key part of their 2006 FIFA World Cup qualifying side. Đorđević played every minute in Serbia and Montenegro's failed World Cup campaign, losing each match in their Group C encounters with Argentina, Netherlands, and Ivory Coast.

== Personal life ==
He is married to a woman of Greek descent from Pyrgos, the first town in Greece he has ever lived and played at. He has both Serbian and Greek citizenship.

== Career statistics ==
=== Club ===
Appearances and goals by club, season and competition
Club	Season	League			National cup (Note: Includes Greek Cup)		Europe		Total	
Club	Season	Division	Apps	Goals	Apps	Goals	Apps	Goals	Apps	Goals
Spartak Subotica (loan)	1991–92	Yugoslav First League	25	3					25	3
Red Star Belgrade	1992–93	First League of FR Yugoslavia	5	0					5	0
Paniliakos	1992–93	Gamma Ethniki	22	8			–		22	8
Paniliakos	1993–94	Gamma Ethniki	33	13			–		33	13
Paniliakos	1994–95	Beta Ethniki	33	10			–		33	10
Paniliakos	1995–96	Alpha Ethniki	31	2			–		31	2
Paniliakos	Total		119	33			–		119	33
Olympiacos	1996–97	Alpha Ethniki	18	4	4	2	2 (Note: Appearances in UEFA Cup)	0	24	6
Olympiacos	1997–98	Alpha Ethniki	33	12	2	0	7 (Note: Appearances in UEFA Champions League)	1	42	13
Olympiacos	1998–99	Alpha Ethniki	30	8	7	1	10	3	47	12
Olympiacos	1999–2000	Alpha Ethniki	30	12	7	1	8 (Note: Six appearances in UEFA Champions League, two appearances and two goals in UEFA Cup)	2	45	15
Olympiacos	2000–01	Alpha Ethniki	25	14	11	4	8 (Note: Six appearances and two goals in UEFA Champions League, two appearances in UEFA Cup)	2	44	20
Olympiacos	2001–02	Alpha Ethniki	23	13	4	3	5	0	32	16
Olympiacos	2002–03	Alpha Ethniki	29	14	1	0	6	4	36	18
Olympiacos	2003–04	Alpha Ethniki	25	10	4	0	5	0	34	10
Olympiacos	2004–05	Alpha Ethniki	25	5	8	3	7 (Note: Three appearances and one goal in UEFA Champions League, four appearances and one goal in UEFA Cup)	2	40	10
Olympiacos	2005–06	Alpha Ethniki	29	15	7	1	5	0	41	16
Olympiacos	2006–07	Super League Greece	25	7	2	1	6	0	33	8
Olympiacos	2007–08	Super League Greece	27	10	4	0	7	0	38	10
Olympiacos	2008–09	Super League Greece	24	2	5	0	7 (Note: Two appearances in UEFA Champions League, five appearances and one goal in UEFA Cup)	1	36	3
Olympiacos	Total		343	126	66	16	83	15	492	157
Career total			492	162	66	16	83	15	641	193

=== International ===
Appearances and goals by national team and year
National team	Year	Apps	Goals
FR Yugoslavia	1998	2	0
FR Yugoslavia	1999	0	0
FR Yugoslavia	2000	6	0
FR Yugoslavia	2001	7	1
FR Yugoslavia	2002	6	0
Serbia and Montenegro	2003	2	0
Serbia and Montenegro	2004	1	0
Serbia and Montenegro	2005	8	0
Serbia and Montenegro	2006	5	0
Total		37	1

Scores and results list FR Yugoslavia's goal tally first, score column indicates score after each Đorđević goal.

List of international goals scored by Predrag Ðorđević
No.	Date	Venue	Opponent	Score	Result	Competition
1	5 September 2001	Partizan Stadium, Belgrade, FR Yugoslavia	Slovenia	1–1	1–1	2002 FIFA World Cup qualification

== Honours ==
Paniliakos

- Beta Ethniki: 1994–95
- Gamma Ethniki: 1993–94

Olympiacos

- Alpha Ethniki/Super League Greece: 1996–97, 1997–98, 1998–99, 1999–2000, 2000–01, 2001–02, 2002–03, 2004–05, 2005–06, 2006–07, 2007–08, 2008–09
- Greek Cup: 1998–99, 2004–05, 2005–06, 2007–08, 2008–09
- Greek Super Cup: 2007

Individual

- Alpha Ethniki/Super League Greece Best Foreign Player: 2000–01, 2001–02, 2002–03
- Alpha Ethniki/Super League Greece top assist provider: 2003–04
- Olympiacos Golden Eleven
