= Georgios Anatolakis =

Greek footballer (born in 1974)

Georgios Anatolakis Γεώργιος Ανατολάκης

Member of Hellenic Parliament
- In office 7 October 2009 – 17 June 2012

Personal details
- Born: 16 March 1974 (age 52) Thessaloniki, Greece
- Party: Popular Orthodox Rally
- Spouse: Ioanna Holeva
- Children: Filippa-Panayiota, Fivi
- Occupation: Politician
- Profession: Football player
- Website: archive.org (in greek)

Georgios Anatolakis
Personal information
- Full name: Georgios Anatolakis
- Date of birth: 16 March 1974 (age 52)
- Place of birth: Thessaloniki, Greece
- Height: 1.85 m (6 ft 1 in)
- Position: Defender

Senior career*
Years	Team	Apps	(Gls)
1992–1997	Iraklis	134	(4)
1997–2007	Olympiacos	246	(10)
2007–2008	Atromitos	24	(0)
Total		404	(14)

International career
1996–2007	Greece	22	(1)
- * Club domestic league appearances and goals

Georgios Anatolakis (Greek: Γεώργιος Ανατολάκης; born 16 March 1974) is a Greek former professional footballer who played as a defender. He is well known in Greece for his strength, passion and persistence. A strong aerial challenger, he also advances on set pieces to find himself scoring on several occasions. He most notably scored the winning goal for Olympiacos' first match in the renovated Georgios Karaiskakis.

== Club career ==
Alongside Predrag Đorđević, Anatolakis is one of two Olympiacos players to have been part of all nine of their Greek championship victories since 1996.

Produced by Ethnikos Pylaias, Anatolakis first appeared in the Greek top flight as an 18-year-old for Iraklis in the 1992/93 season, going on to make a further 133 outings for the Thessalonika-based team prior to a move to Olympiacos during 1996/97.

A fearsome competitor, he was a key squad member as Olympiacos won every title from then until 2003–04, and the following season Anatolakis had his finest hour as the league championship was regained. His contribution to their double-winning campaign was rewarded with a two-year contract extension, and the following season the league and Greek Cup were captured again.

In July 2007, Anatolakis joined Greek side Atromitos after being released by longtime club Olympiacos, after 1 year left Atromitos F.C.

Anatolakis reached 67 appearances (1 goal) in all UEFA competitions with Iraklis and Olympiakos.

== International career ==
Anatolakis made his international debut for Greece on 27 March 1996 in a friendly against Portugal in Lisbon. Many thought that would be the start of a lengthy career but he was subsequently more out of the side than in and did not appear from 1999 until October 2005, when he was a substitute in a 1-0 FIFA World Cup qualifying win against Georgia. He has since featured regularly.

== Political career ==
Anatolakis was elected in B' Piraeus, in the 4 October 2009 elections, as a member of the Popular Orthodox Rally Party and was a member of the Greek parliament.

== Honours ==
=== Championships ===
- 1996-1997
- 1997-1998
- 1998-1999
- 1999-2000
- 2000-2001
- 2001-2002
- 2002-2003
- 2004-2005
- 2005-2006
- 2006-2007

=== Greek Cups ===
- 1998–1999
- 2004–2005
- 2005–2006
