= Peter Ofori-Quaye =

Ghanaian footballer (born 1980)

Personal information
- Date of birth: 21 March 1980 (age 46)
- Place of birth: Accra, Ghana
- Height: 1.82 m (6 ft 0 in)
- Position: Forward

Senior career*
Years	Team	Apps	(Gls)
1995–1997	Kalamata	34	(8)
1997–2003	Olympiacos	80	(24)
2004–2005	Liberty Professionals	0	(0)
2005–2007	OFI	45	(8)
2007–2008	Hapoel Kiryat Shmona	26	(4)
2008–2009	AEL Limassol	11	(3)
2011–2012	Bechem United	-	(1)
Total		196	(48)

International career
1998–2007	Ghana	18	(2)
- * Club domestic league appearances and goals

Peter Ofori-Quaye (born 21 March 1980) is a Ghanaian former professional footballer who played as a forward. Ofori-Quaye spent most of his career in the Super League Greece and amassed 33 goals in his 10 seasons in the league.

During a 1997–98 UEFA Champions League group stage match on 1 October 1997, he scored for Olympiacos against Rosenborg when he was 17 years and 195 days old, becoming the youngest player to score in the competition's history. The record stood for twenty-two years until 10 December 2019 when it was broken by Ansu Fati of FC Barcelona at the age of 17 years and 40 days. At the international level, he played 18 matches for the Ghana national team and scored 2 goals. He featured for national team at the 1998 and 2000 African Cup of Nations tournaments.

== Early life ==
Ofori-Quaye is a native of Mamprobi, a suburb of Accra known for producing very sportspeople that are considered talented, including former Ghanaian captain Stephen Appiah, the Saba brothers (Christian Saba and Robert Saba), Ali Jarra, and former world boxing champion Azumah Nelson.

== Club career ==
=== Kalamata ===
Born in Accra, Ofori-Quaye came to Greece at the age of 15, signing for Kalamata during the Stavros Papadopoulos era of the club. The Papadopoulos era was noted for bringing in talented players from the nation of Ghana with Ofori-Quaye proving to be the most promising player ahead of teammates Samuel Johnson and Derek Boateng.

=== Olympiacos ===
At the age of 17, Ofori-Quaye signed for Greek champions Olympiacos for a club record of US$3.5 million. Ofori-Quaye attracted much attention from other clubs, scoring key goals including those in the UEFA Champions League against the likes of Rosenborg, Lyon, and Deportivo La Coruna. In the middle of Olympiacos' coach changing crisis, Ofori-Quaye was released by the club in 2003. He won six Greek Championships with the Piraeus based club, a Hellenic Cup, and helped them reach the quarter-finals of the 1998–99 UEFA Champions League.

=== Liberty Professionals ===
After a year away from football, he signed for Ghanaian club Liberty Professionals FC in 2004. In 2005, he returned to Greece signing for OFI where he began to hit good form and was recalled to his national team.

=== Kiryat Shmona ===
In July 2007 newly promoted Israeli club Kiryat Shmona tried to sign him, but his contract was not approved in the first place with OFI reporting him missing for the past three months. He went on and played 26 matches and scored 4 goals during his only season with the club.

=== AEL Limassol ===
Ofori-Quaye moved to Cyprus where joined Limassol club AEL Limassol in the summer of 2008. On 30 August 2008, he made his debut appearance as he was named on the starting 11 for the first match of the season against Apollon Smyrnis. He ended up scoring his first goal in the third minute of the match which ended in a 3–1 win. Due to injuries, he ended his season with 11 league matches and scored 3 goals. During his time with the club they progressed to the final of the 2008–09 Cypriot Cup which they lost by 2–0 to APOP Kinyras. In 2010, Ofori-Quaye was on the verge of moving to Ghana and signing for Accra Hearts of Oak but the deal fell through.

=== Bechem United and retirement ===
After being out for a while due to injuries and almost signing for Accra Hearts of Oak in 2010, Ofori-Quaye returned to Ghana and joined newly promoted Ahafo based club Bechem United in 2011 on a one-year deal. This made him one of the few Ghanaian foreign based players to return and play in the local league. He spoke against suggestions from the public that he was coming to the end of his career and stated in interviews that he had rather joined the club to restart his career. On 23 October 2011, he scored his only league in a match 3–2 loss to Kumasi Asante Kotoko, after scoring the equalizer in the 44th minute of the match after Nathaniel Asamoah scored for Kotoko. On 6 November 2011, in a match against Aduana Stars, he missed a penalty after he had been fouled in the 35th minute, failing to double their early lead through Richard Addai. The match ended in a 1–1 draw after Godfred Saka converted a penalty on the stroke on half time. He went on and played several matches in the Ghana Premier League until his contract ended in 2012.

== International career ==
=== Youth ===
Ofori-Quaye was a member of the Ghana national under-20 football team in the late 1990s. He featured for team during the 1997 and 1999 FIFA World Youth Championship. He played a key role in both tournaments, scoring 2 goals in the former and helping Ghana place 4th after losing to Republic of Ireland during the third place play-off. During the 1999 edition, he scored 4 goals, ending the tournament as the joint second top goal scorer even though the team could not go pass the quarter-final stage as they were eliminated by Spain after a penalty shoot-out.

=== Senior ===
After his impressive form in Ghana U-20 team and in his first season with Olympiacos, he was called up to the senior team, the Black Stars. He made his debut on 19 January 1998 in a friendly match against Mozambique. He was named in the 22-man squad for the 1998 African Cup of Nations, where he played two matches with Ghana in the group stages. On 28 February 1999, he scored his debut goal in the 2000 AFCON qualifiers against Eritrea which ended in a 5–0 victory. He also made the squad for the 2000 African Cup of Nations. He played 2 matches as Ghana were eliminated in the quarter-finals by South Africa. In October 2006, after being out of the national team for three years, he received a call up for Ghana's International friendly match against Australia on 14 November in London. He played started the match, played 75 minutes before being substituted for Asamoah Gyan, who came on and created the goal for Junior Agogo to score his first international goal in order for Ghana to draw 1–1.

== Career statistics ==
Appearances and goals by national team and year
National team	Year	Apps	Goals
Ghana	1998	5	0
Ghana	1999	3	1
Ghana	2000	4	0
Ghana	2001	0	0
Ghana	2002	3	1
Ghana	2003	1	0
Ghana	2004	0	0
Ghana	2005	0	0
Ghana	2006	1	0
Ghana	2007	1	0
Total		18	2

Score and Result lists Ghana's goals first

List of international goals scored by Peter Ofori Quaye
No.	Date	Venue	Cap	Opponent	Score	Result	Competition	Ref.
1	28 February 1999	Ohene Djan Stadium, Accra, Ghana	7	Eritrea	4–0	5–0	2000 AFCON qualifiers	
2	22 October 2002	Ohene Djan Stadium, Accra, Ghana	14	Lesotho	2–1	2–1	Friendly	
As of 22 October 2002

== Honours ==
Olympiacos

- Super League Greece: 1997–98, 1998–99, 1999–2000, 2000–01, 2001–02, 2002–03
- Greek Cup: 1998–99

AEL Limassol

- Cypriot Cup runner up: 2008–09
