= Paraskevas Antzas =

Greek footballer (1976–2026)

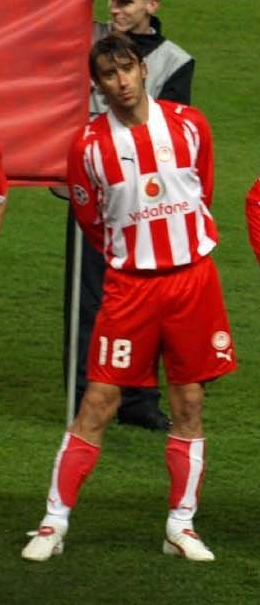
- Antzas in 2008

Personal information
- Date of birth: 18 August 1976
- Place of birth: Drama, Greece
- Date of death: 25 May 2026 (aged 49)
- Place of death: Drama, Greece
- Height: 1.92 m (6 ft 4 in)
- Position: Centre-back

Youth career
- –1995: Pandramaikos

Senior career*
| Years | Team | Apps | (Gls) |
| 1995–1998 | Skoda Xanthi | 70 | (6) |
| 1998–2003 | Olympiacos | 76 | (2) |
| 2003–2004 | Doxa Drama | 20 | (2) |
| 2004–2007 | Skoda Xanthi | 68 | (5) |
| 2007–2009 | Olympiacos | 40 | (1) |
| Total | | 274 | (16) |

International career
| 1999–2008 | Greece | 26 | (0) |
- * Club domestic league appearances and goals

Paraskevas Antzas (Greek: Παρασκευάς Άντζας, 18 August 1976 – 25 May 2026) was a Greek professional footballer who played as a centre-back. A seven-time league champion and three-time cup champion of Greece, he participated in the UEFA Champions League with Olympiacos and the UEFA Euro 2008 with the Greece national team.

== Career ==
Antzas' career began in Pandramaikos in Gamma Ethniki in 1993. In 1995, he signed with Skoda Xanthi at Alpha Ethniki. In 1998, he signed with Greek Olympiacos and until 2003 played in 76 league games plus 20 international games (18 games in UEFA Champions League and two games in UEFA Europa League, scoring one goal). In 2003, he left Olympiacos, for an unexplained reason, while he was a key member of Greece and had qualified for the European Championship 2004 in Portugal. In 2003 it was announced that he stopped the football for family reasons. He changed his mind and signed with Doxa Drama, on loan from Olympiacos, and consequently he lost his place in the national team, and he regained it years after in 2007 when he returned to Olympiacos from Skoda Xanthi.

On 15 June 2008, one day after the defeat of Greece by Russia in the final tournament of Euro 2008, Antzas announced his retirement from international football. On 3 May 2009, he played his last career game.

== Death ==
Antzas died in Drama on 25 May 2026, after a long battle with amyotrophic lateral sclerosis, at the age of 49.

== Honours ==
Olympiacos

- Super League Greece: 1998–99, 1999–2000, 2000–01, 2001–02, 2002–03, 2007–08, 2008–09
- Greek Cup: 1998–99, 2007–08, 2008–09
- Greek Super Cup: 2007

Greece

- UEFA Euro U21 runner-up: 1998
