= Stelios Giannakopoulos =

Greek footballer and manager

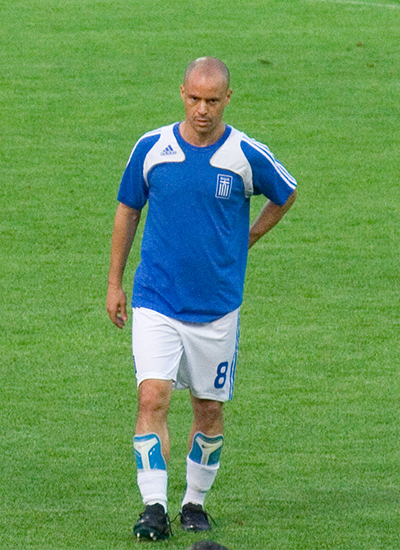
- Stelios playing for Greece in 2008

Personal information
- Full name: Stylianos Giannakopoulos
- Date of birth: 12 July 1974 (age 52)
- Place of birth: Athens, Greece
- Height: 1.70 m (5 ft 7 in)
- Positions: Winger; attacking midfielder

Youth career
- 1987-1991: Doxa Vyronos
- 1991–1992: Ethnikos Asteras

Senior career*
Years	Team	Apps	(Gls)
1992–1993	Ethnikos Asteras	32	(6)
1993–1996	Paniliakos	84	(26)
1996–2003	Olympiacos	190	(64)
2003–2008	Bolton Wanderers	137	(20)
2008–2009	Hull City	2	(0)
2009	AEL	19	(3)
Total		464	(119)

International career
1997–2008	Greece	77	(12)

Managerial career
- 2012–2013: Paniliakos
- 2016–2018: A.E. Kifisia
- 2019: Greece (assistant)
Medal record
Men's football
Representing Greece
UEFA European Championship
Winner	2004
- * Club domestic league appearances and goals

Stylianos (or Stelios) Giannakopoulos (Greek: Στυλιανός (Στέλιος) Γιαννακόπουλος; born 12 July 1974), known mononymously as Stelios due to his long surname, is a Greek football manager and former player. During his playing career, Stelios was a winger or attacking midfielder and a well-known figure in Greek football, especially during his tenure at Bolton Wanderers and at UEFA Euro 2004, where Greece won.

== Club career ==
=== Early career ===
Giannakopoulos is the second son of Alekos, a former football player who played during the 1960's. He joined Ethnikos Asteras (the semi-professional club of his neighbourhood Kaisariani) when he was seven years old, later moved for one year to Doxa Vyronas, and finally made his first-team debut for Ethnikos Asteras in the autumn of 1991, in a season which ended with the club gaining promotion to the professional Third Division. Next year, in his opening season as a professional, the young striker found himself scoring six goals and impressing the scouters of clubs that participated in higher divisions. In the summer of 1993 he moved to Paniliakos; he stayed there for three years, scoring 26 goals in 84 games and establishing himself as a member of the national U21 team.

=== Olympiacos ===
Having attracted the attention of the top clubs, in the summer of 1996 Giannakopoulos signed for Olympiacos at the age of 21. One of Giannakopoulos' career highlights came in only his second season with the club when he prestigiously scored Olympiacos' first ever Champions League goal against Porto. The stunning 40-meter lob was voted as the goal of the competition by fans and also led to Olympiacos' first ever win in the competition. Olympiacos won the Greek championship in every single season while Giannakopoulos was with them and reached the quarter finals of the Champions League during the 1998–99 season. His reputation as a player was cemented in his last and most successful season with the club when he scored 15 goals, including 2 goals in the title deciding 3–0 win over arch rivals Panathinaikos in May 2003. Giannakopoulos spent a total of seven successful seasons there as a regular player, making a total of 189 appearances and scoring 63 goals in all competitions. To this day Giannakopoulos regularly attends special events at his former club and is considered a legend by the fans, notably for the determination he put into every match including the derbies against arch-rivals Panathinaikos and AEK Athens, where he scored many of his finest goals.

=== Bolton Wanderers ===
However, on 28 May 2003, after ten years of professional football in Greece he was snapped up by English Premier League side Bolton Wanderers. The manager at the time Sam Allardyce described Giannakopoulos as "...an attacking midfielder who knows how to score goals. His main attribute remains his ability to make late runs into the penalty area and his flair to shoot accurately from range." It was at this point that the popular name 'Stelios' came about as the player unconventionally chose for his first name to be printed on his shirt instead of his very long (and difficult for the English journalists) surname. He made his Bolton début against Manchester United and helped Bolton reach the 2004 Football League Cup Final and their highest ever Premier League finish in his first season. Giannakopoulos' first two seasons with the club were successful, demonstrated by the fact that both Manchester City and Liverpool openly attempted to sign him before he signed a new contract with Bolton in August 2005.

His fine form continued into the 2005–06 season which was Giannakopoulos' most successful as he was top scorer for Bolton with 12 goals, an impressive tally for a midfielder. One of the highlights of that season was the winning goal he scored against Arsenal in an FA Cup fourth round match played at the Reebok Stadium on 28 January 2006. His form dipped slightly in the 2006–07 season where he missed several games through injury and failed to score any goals although he was still a regular player for the club with 28 games.

On 17 March 2006, he was chosen to play in a 50th anniversary game for the pact of Rome and for the participation of Manchester United in UEFA competitions, in a match that took place in Old Trafford. Giannakopoulos played in the second half alongside players such as Steven Gerrard, Robbie Fowler, Andrea Pirlo, Zlatan Ibrahimovic, Henrik Larsson, Gennaro Gattuso and others against Manchester United in a 4–3 loss.

With Sam Allardyce leaving the club at the start of the 2007–08 season and only a year left on his contract, there were rumours of Giannakopoulos moving to another Premier League club or returning to Greece. However Giannakopoulos stayed at Bolton and although he was not as regular a player as previous seasons (due to injury and managerial changes) he was able to help Bolton with a string of late goals. The first one during injury time in the League Cup third round tie against Fulham at Craven Cottage, the second one in the UEFA Cup, when Giannakopoulos scored in the third minute of injury time to salvage a 1–1 draw against Aris Salonica and the third one in a Premier League game versus Derby when Giannakopoulos again scored in injury time to earn Bolton a much needed three points in what was a poor season for the team. His last ever goal for Bolton was a crucial one and came on 26 April 2008 when he scored in the 1–1 draw against Tottenham Hotspur helping Bolton avoid relegation.

At the end of the season Giannakopoulos was not offered a new contract and was released by the club fuelling speculation that he would be returning to his native Greece and finishing off his career at Olympiacos. However the player confirmed that he would prefer to stay in the Premier League, and was subsequently linked with a move to newly promoted Premier League club Hull City, after interest from their new manager Phil Brown who worked with Giannakopoulos at Bolton.

=== Hull City ===
On 22 September 2008 it was confirmed by Hull that they had signed Giannakopoulos on a one-year deal. Giannakopoulos is another player who arrived at Hull City with an impressive track record, having spent 5 years in the Premier League with Bolton and winning Euro 2004 with Greece. He joined the Tigers in 2008, for the club's first ever season in the top flight under Phil Brown.

He made his debut for Hull against Portsmouth exactly 2 months after joining them on 22 November 2008, coming on as a sub in the 82nd minute. Giannakopoulos would make one more substitute appearance in the league as well as a full game in the FA cup before he decided to make a further move having been frustrated by his lack of games at Hull.

=== AEL ===
On 22 January 2009, six years after his first move to the UK, Giannakopoulos returned to Greece by signing for Greek side AEL on a one-and-a-half-year deal. Giannakopoulos' impact was instant as the Greek press labeled him the 'most important transfer of the winter period' as he scored three crucial goals in his first four games to propel AEL to a top 5 position in the Super League Greece. Larissa were able to maintain this position until the end of the season which qualified them for European competition, something which Giannakopoulos admitted was a great achievement and totally unexpected for a smaller team like Larissa and compared it to his time with Bolton. The following season however was not as successful as Giannakopoulos struggled with injuries and even courted controversy with some comments he made to the Greek press that were seen as being disloyal to his team. He parted company amicably with Larissa on 12 December 2009, six months before his contract would have officially ended.

== International career ==
Giannakopoulos made his international debut on 12 March 1997 in a friendly game against Cyprus. His first international goal came almost two years later on 5 February 1999 in a friendly game against Belgium. He fell out of favour slightly in 2000 and 2001 featuring in only three games in two years however cemented his place in the team from 2002 onwards, featuring in every single game of the EURO 2004 qualifiers. One of his most important and memorable goals with the Greece national football team was during those qualifiers; Giannakopoulos scoring the only goal in a 1–0 away victory against Spain in Zaragoza, in a game which ensured automatic qualification for Greece. He was also one of the key players in the victorious team at the 2004 European Football Championship playing in four out of six games including the final. Following this success, Giannakopoulos would remain a key part of the national team, becoming Greece's top scorer in their failed 2006 FIFA World Cup qualifying campaign. He was also amongst the squad that unsuccessfully defended their title at the Euro 2008 competition. His last game for the national team came during that competition, in the 2–1 defeat against Spain on 18 June 2008. Giannakopoulos had scored a total of 12 goals for the national team; an interesting statistic being that Greece had won all but one of the games in which Giannakopoulos had scored in.

== Managerial career and life after football ==
On 25 May 2010, Giannakopoulos was voted as president of the Greek Professional Footballers Association, taking over from his former teammate Antonios Nikopolidis. He started his managerial career on 13 August 2012 after taking charge of his old team Paniliakos F.C. in Football League 2 (Greece). Paniliakos fired Stelios on 20 January 2013. Other managerial stints followed including a short spell with A.E._Kifisia_F.C. in 2016 and assisting the national team manager Angelos Anastasiadis during his position as the Greece national team coach in 2018–19.

There were some widespread but short-lived talk in 2015 that Giannakopoulos was heading a consortium to take over the financially troubled Bolton Wanderers but this did not materialise.

Giannakopoulos has been a vocal critic of how football is run in Greece, in March 2015 he said in an interview with BBC Sport that he feared continued violence at games threatened the future of the sport in his country. The Greek government had suspended professional football play three times that season because of violence at matches. "Football people like myself, we are little bit concerned about football in Greece in the future," said Giannakopoulos. He also added: "We need support from UEFA, from [world players' union] FIFPro and of course we need support from the Greek government, which is completely new. All these [should] sit down together at the same table and take some decisions."

== Personal life ==
Giannakopoulos' second born son, Dimitris, is also a footballer and as of 2022 plays for the Bolton Wanderers Academy.

== Career statistics ==
=== Club ===
Appearances and goals by club, season and competition
Club	Season	League			National cup (Note: Includes Greek Football Cup, FA Cup)		League cup (Note: Includes Football League Cup)		Europe		Other		Total	
Club	Season	Division	Apps	Goals	Apps	Goals	Apps	Goals	Apps	Goals	Apps	Goals	Apps	Goals
Ethnikos Asteras	1992–93	Football League 2 Greece	32	6			–		–		–		32	6
Paniliakos	1993–94	Football League Greece	26	9			–		–		–		26	9
Paniliakos	1994–95	Football League Greece	31	10			–		–		–		31	10
Paniliakos	1995–96	Alpha Ethniki	27	7			–		–		–		27	7
Paniliakos	Total		84	26			–		–		–		84	26
Olympiacos	1996–97	Alpha Ethniki	31	7			–				–		31	7
Olympiacos	1997–98	Alpha Ethniki	31	3			–		7	1	–		38	4
Olympiacos	1998–99	Alpha Ethniki	23	7			–		10 (Note: Appearances in UEFA Champions League)	3	–		33	10
Olympiacos	1999–2000	Alpha Ethniki	29	10			–		6 (Note: Four appearances and one goal in UEFA Champions League, two appearances and one goal in UEFA Cup)	2	–		35	12
Olympiacos	2000–01	Alpha Ethniki	26	11			–		6 (Note: Five appearances in UEFA Champions League, one appearance in UEFA Cup)	0	–		32	11
Olympiacos	2001–02	Alpha Ethniki	21	11			–		5	2	–		26	12
Olympiacos	2002–03	Alpha Ethniki	29	15			–		6	1	–		35	16
Olympiacos	Total	Alpha Ethniki	190	64			–		40	9	–		230	72
Bolton Wanderers	2003–04	Premier League	31	2	2	0	6	2	–		–		39	4
Bolton Wanderers	2004–05	Premier League	34	7	2	1	2	0	–		–		38	8
Bolton Wanderers	2005–06	Premier League	34	9	4	2	2	0	6 (Note: Appearances in UEFA Cup)	1	–		46	12
Bolton Wanderers	2006–07	Premier League	23	0	3	0	2	0	–		–		28	0
Bolton Wanderers	2007–08	Premier League	15	2	1	0	2	1	8	1	–		26	4
Bolton Wanderers	Total		137	20	12	3	14	3	14	2	–		177	28
Hull City	2008–09	Premier League	2	0	1	0	0	0	–		–		3	0
AEL	2008–09	Super League Greece	9	3			–		–		6 (Note: Appearances in Super League Greece play-offs)	0	15	3
AEL	2009–10	Super League Greece	10	0			–		–		–		10	0
AEL	Total		19	3			–		–		6	0	25	3
Career total			464	119	13	3	14	3	54	11	6	0	551	136

=== International ===
Scores and results list Greece's goal tally first, score column indicates score after each Giannakopoulos goal.

List of international goals scored by Stelios Giannakopoulos
No.	Date	Venue	Opponent	Score	Result	Competition
1	5 February 1999	GSZ Stadium, Larnaca, Cyprus	Belgium		1–0	Friendly
2	10 March 1999	Olympic Stadium, Athens, Greece	Croatia		3–2	Friendly
3	10 March 1999	Olympic Stadium, Athens, Greece	Croatia		3–2	Friendly
4	12 May 2002	Fotis Kosmas Stadium, Alexandroupolis, Greece	Romania		3–2	Unofficial friendly
5	21 August 2002	Farul Stadium, Constanța, Romania	Romania		1–0	Friendly
6	7 June 2003	La Romareda, Zaragoza, Spain	Spain		1–0	UEFA Euro 2004 qualifying
7	20 August 2003	Idrottsparken, Norrköping, Sweden	Sweden		2–1	Friendly
8	4 September 2004	Qemal Stafa Stadium, Tirana, Albania	Albania		1–2	World Cup 2006 qualifying
9	26 March 2005	Lokomotivi Stadium, Tbilisi, Georgia	Georgia		3–1	World Cup 2006 qualifying
10	7 September 2005	Tsentralny Stadium, Almaty, Kazakhstan	Kazakhstan		2–1	World Cup 2006 qualifying
11	16 November 2005	Karaiskaki Stadium, Athens, Greece	Hungary		2–1	Friendly
12	1 March 2006	GSP Stadium, Nicosia, Cyprus	Kazakhstan		2–0	Friendly

== Honours ==
Paniliakos

- Beta Ethniki: 1994–95

Olympiacos

- Alpha Ethniki: 1996–97, 1997–98, 1998–99, 1999–2000, 2000–01, 2001–02, 2002–03
- Greek Cup: 1998–99; runner-up: 2000–01, 2001–02

Bolton Wanderers

- Football League Cup runner-up: 2003–04

Greece

- UEFA Euro: 2004

Individual

- Greek Footballer of the Year: 2003
- Greek Second Division best player: 1995
