= Andreas Niniadis =

Pontic Greek footballer

Personal information
- Full name: Andreas Niniadis
- Date of birth: 18 February 1971 (age 55)
- Place of birth: Tbilisi, Georgian SSR, Soviet Union (now Georgia)
- Height: 1.69 m (5 ft 7 in)
- Position: Midfielder

Youth career
- –1980–1988: FC Dinamo Tbilisi

Senior career*
Years	Team	Apps	(Gls)
1990–1991	Dinamo Batumi	20	(13)
1991–1994	Pontioi Veria	80	(20)
1994–1996	Ethnikos Piraeus	49	(15)
1996–2004	Olympiacos	243	(40)
2004–2005	Kerkyra	28	(5)

International career
1995–2001	Greece	17	(2)

Managerial career
- 2005–2011: Olympiacos (assistant coach, chief scout)
- * Club domestic league appearances and goals

Andreas Niniadis (Greek: Aνδρέας Nινιάδης; born 18 February 1971) is a Pontic-Greek former professional footballer.

== Club career ==
He was one of the dominant players in one of Olympiacos gold eras (1997–2003) and he helped his team to reach seven Greek superleague championships successively and one Greek cup as well. He also played for Pontioi Veria, Ethnikos Piraeus F.C. and Kerkira FC.

He played 23 Champions League matches with Olympiakos, scoring five goals, and three UEFA Cup matches, scoring one goal.

== International career ==
Niniadis earned 17 appearances for Greece, scoring two goals.

== Managerial career ==
Since his retirement, Niniadis has been employed by his former club Olympiacos as a chief scout and an assistant manager. In the 2006–07 and 2009–10 seasons he was the assistant coach of Takis Lemonis and Bozidar Bandovic.

== Honours ==
Olympiacos

- Alpha Ethniki: 1996–97, 1997–98, 1998–99, 1999–2000, 2000–01, 2001–02, 2002–03
- Greek Cup: 1998–99
