= Lampros Choutos =

Greek retired footballer

Personal information
- Full name: Lampros Choutos
- Date of birth: 7 December 1979 (age 46)
- Place of birth: Athens, Greece
- Height: 1.74 m (5 ft 9 in)
- Position: Striker

Youth career
- Asteras Polygonou
- 1993–1995: Panathinaikos
- 1995: Roma

Senior career*
Years	Team	Apps	(Gls)
1996–1999	Roma	3	(0)
1999–2004	Olympiacos	47	(22)
2004–2007	Inter Milan	1	(0)
2004	→ Atalanta (loan)	1	(0)
2005	→ Reggina (loan)	9	(0)
2006	→ Mallorca (loan)	9	(2)
2007–2009	Panionios	23	(12)
2009	PAOK	8	(0)
2009–2010	Valle Giovenco	18	(3)
Total		119	(39)

International career
1999–2002	Greece U21	10	(15)
1999–2003	Greece	10	(3)
- * Club domestic league appearances and goals

Lampros Choutos (sometimes Lambros; born 7 December 1979) is a Greek former professional footballer who played as a striker.

During his career, he played equal periods of time in his country and Italy.

== Club career ==
=== Early years ===
Born in Athens, Choutos started his career with Asteras Polygonou, being discovered by scouts of Panathinaikos. After only two years, he moved to Italy to finish his football grooming with AS Roma.

=== Professionals ===
Choutos' first stop as a senior was back in his country, loaned by Roma to Olympiacos after stellar performances during the qualifying stages for the 2000 UEFA European Under-21 Championship, as he netted 15 goals in only ten matches. He gradually made his way into the first team under the direction of Alberto Bigon, forming a productive attacking trio with Slovenia's Zlatko Zahovič and Giovanni from Brazil.

Although he suffered from an injured knee, Choutos managed to score decisive goals. He helped the Piraeus club win the 2000, 2001 and 2003 Super League championships before returning to Italy, with Inter Milan.

Choutos signed a three-year contract with Inter in summer 2004, but could never settle there, being constantly loaned to other minor sides in both the country and abroad (Spain's RCD Mallorca, where he quickly fell out of favour with manager Héctor Cúper). He made his competitive debut for the Nerazzurri on 9 November 2006, coming on as a 78th-minute substitute for Mariano González in a Coppa Italia clash against F.C. Messina Peloro, which took place more than two years after his arrival; he left at the end of the campaign.

Choutos returned to his country in the 2007 off-season after signing with Panionios, but was only eligible to start playing in the following January. He again began experiencing first-team football, and notably scored two of three at Athens Olympic Sports Complex to help defeat hosts AEK Athens and collect the Man of the match award; he finished his half season with 12 goals, as his team finished in sixth position and participated in the second stage.

Choutos started his second year in scoring fashion, netting twice against OFK Beograd in the UEFA Intertoto Cup (3–1 home win, 3–2 on aggregate). After a run-in with the club's assistant coach that supposedly turned physical, however, the player was forced to leave.

On 2 February 2009, Choutos signed a six-month contract with PAOK, appearing in eight scoreless matches. On 25 August he returned to Italy once again, joining lowly A.S. Pescina Valle del Giovenco for two years; his contract was cancelled in July 2010, after the club was excluded from the Italian football league system due to financial issues.

== International career ==
Courtesy of his solid under-21 performances, Choutos soon made his debut for the Greek full side, going on to win ten caps in four years. He was overlooked for the squads that appeared at both UEFA Euro 2004 and 2008.

== Personal life ==
Choutos origin is from the village Agioi Thedoroi, Trikala.

== Honours ==
Olympiacos

- Alpha Ethniki: 1999–2000, 2000–01, 2002–03

Inter

- Serie A: 2006–07
- Coppa Italia: 2004–05
