= Georgios Amanatidis =

Greek footballer

Giorgos Amanatidis
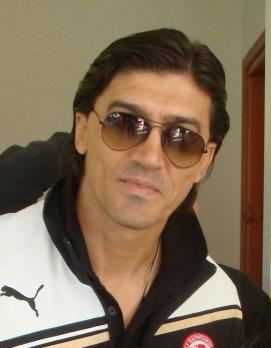

Personal information
- Full name: Georgios Amanatidis
- Date of birth: 4 April 1970 (age 56)
- Place of birth: Mesopotamia, Greece
- Height: 1.82 m (6 ft 0 in)
- Position: Defender

Team information
- Current team: Chania (Technical Director)

Senior career*
Years	Team	Apps	(Gls)
1985–1990	Astrapi Mesopotamias		
1990–1993	Apollon Kalamarias	64	(1)
1993–2003	Olympiacos	205	(11)
2003–2004	APOEL	24	(1)
2004–2005	Kerkyra	19	(0)
2005–2006	Ethnikos Asteras	11	(0)
2006	Panachaiki	10	(0)
Total		333	(13)

International career
1997	Greece military		
1999–2000	Greece	18	(2)

Managerial career
- 2007–2018: Olympiacos (Scout)
- 2021– 2022: Chania (Technical Director)
- 2023–: Kampaniakos (Manager)
- * Club domestic league appearances and goals

Georgios Amanatidis (Greek: Γεώργιος Αμανατίδης; born 4 April 1970) is a Greek former professional footballer who played as a defender.

== Club career ==
Amanatidis was captain of the Greek side Olympiacos, and a member of the team which reached 7 Greek Championships successively (1997–2003). After 13 years in Olympiacos, he joined the roster of his former coach Takis Lemonis at Cypriot club APOEL in which he won the championship also. He also played for Apollon Kalamarias, Kerkyra, Ethnikos Asteras and Panachaiki.

== International career ==
Amanatidis earned 18 caps for Greece.

== Personal life ==
He is not related to Greek striker Ioannis Amanatidis.

== Honours ==
=== Club ===
Olympiacos

- Alpha Ethniki: 1996–97, 1997–98, 1998―99, 1999―2000, 2000–01, 2001–02, 2002–03
- Greek Cup: 1998―99
