= Dušan Bajević =

Bosnian football manager (born 1948)

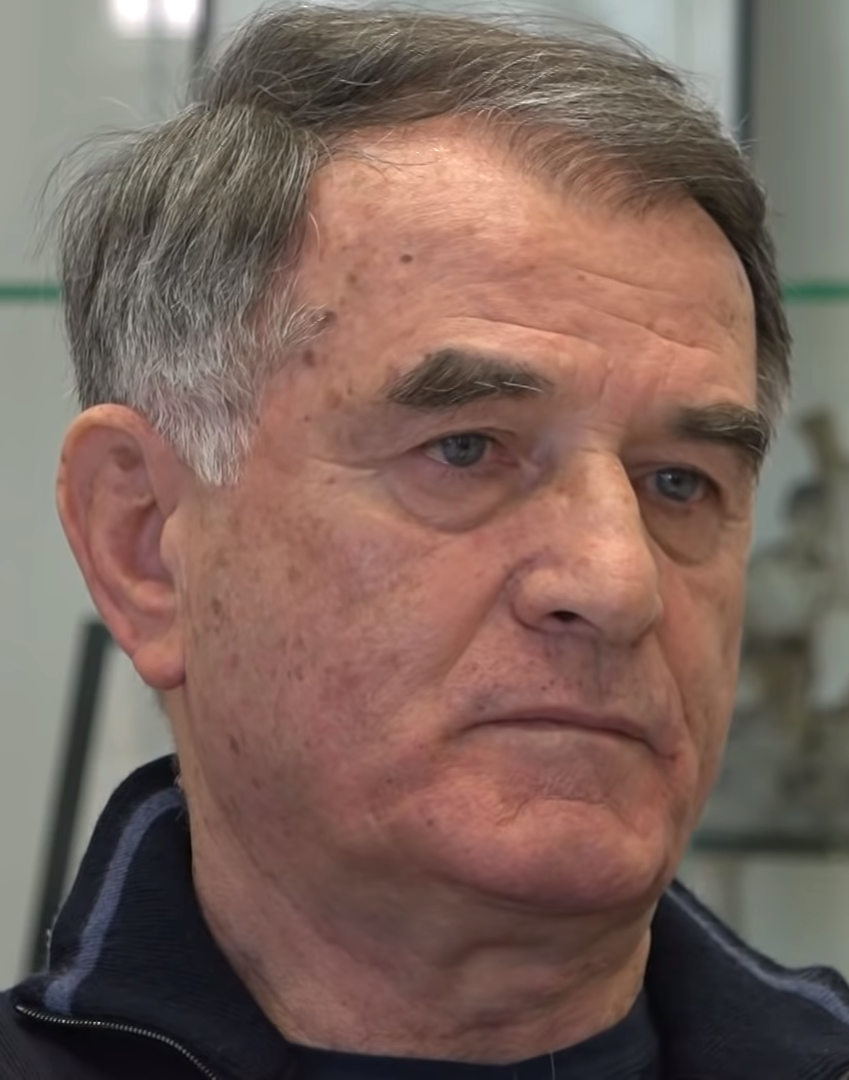
- Bajević in 2020

Personal information
- Date of birth: 10 December 1948 (age 77)
- Place of birth: Mostar, PR Bosnia and Herzegovina, FPR Yugoslavia
- Height: 1.85 m (6 ft 1 in)
- Position: Striker

Senior career*
Years	Team	Apps	(Gls)
1966–1977	Velež Mostar	277	(144)
1977–1981	AEK Athens	106	(65)
1981–1983	Velež Mostar	45	(22)
Total		478	(292)

International career
1970–1977	Yugoslavia	37	(29)

Managerial career
- 1983–1987: Velež Mostar
- 1988–1996: AEK Athens
- 1996–1999: Olympiacos
- 2000–2002: PAOK
- 2002–2004: AEK Athens
- 2004–2005: Olympiacos
- 2006–2007: Red Star Belgrade
- 2007–2008: Aris
- 2008–2010: AEK Athens
- 2010–2011: Omonia
- 2012: Atromitos
- 2019–2020: Bosnia and Herzegovina
- * Club domestic league appearances and goals

Dušan "Duško" Bajević (Serbian Cyrillic: Душан Бајевић, pronounced [dǔʃan bǎjevitɕ]; Greek: Ντούσαν Μπάγεβιτς, romanized: Ntoúsan Mpágievits; born 10 December 1948) is a Bosnian professional football manager and former player. Widely regarded as one of the greatest Bosnian football managers of all time, he is the country's most decorated manager.

A footballer Bajević spent the majority of his playing career at hometown club, Velež Mostar for who he played almost 400 games and scored 184 goals, a club record. From 1977 to 1981 he played for AEK Athens, where he won the Alpha Ethniki two times and the Greek Cup once and is the foreigner with the most goals in the club's history, with 91 goals. Bajević scored 29 goals for Yugoslavia in 37 games. He also represented the country at the 1974 FIFA World Cup.

After retiring as a player, Bajević started working as a manager, winning the Yugoslav Cup with Velež in 1986. He enjoyed the most success in Greece, winning eight Greek league titles, four Greek Cups, one Greek League Cup and one Greek Super Cup with AEK Athens, Olympiacos and PAOK between 1988 and 2005. He is the most successful manager in the history of AEK Athens. His direct move from AEK Athens to Olympiacos in 1996 generated much controversy. Nevertheless his arrival at the latter brought an extended period of domestic dominance, which continued after his sacking in 1999, including another stint from 2004 to 2005. Afterwards, Bajević returned to AEK Athens in 2002 and 2008, and in 2013 as a sporting director, following the club's lone relegation.

== Club career ==
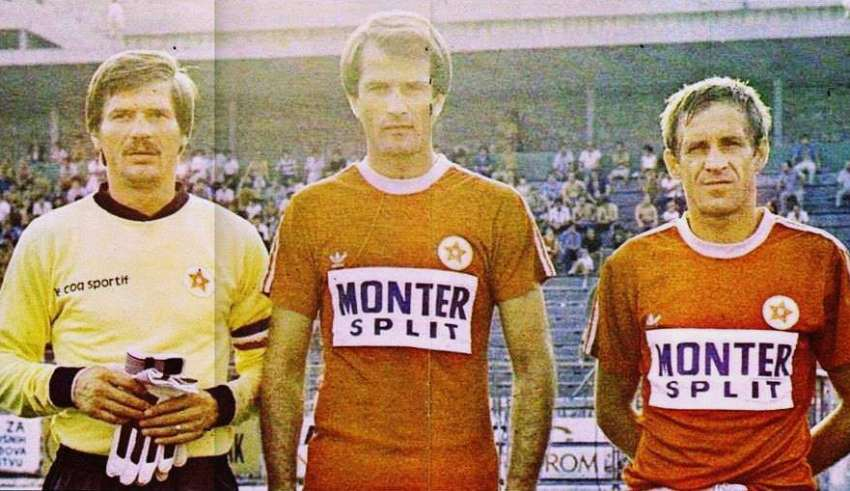
At Velež throughout the 1970s, Bajević, alongside Enver Marić and Franjo Vladić, was part of a trio of homegrown players dubbed BMV by fans and Yugoslav sports media

Bajević started playing football in the infrastructure departments of the local Velež Mostar and developed into a leading figure of the team, becoming their captain. He started playing with the men's in 1966, scoring a total 144 goals in 277 league matches. He was a part of the Velež trio known as the "Mostar BMV" (Bajević, Marić and Vladić) during the 1960s and 1970s. He was voted "best athlete of Yugoslavia" and the press of the time gave him the nickname "Prince of Neretva", after the name of the river that runs through the city of Mostar. He became the top scorer of the league in 1969–70 season, alongside Slobodan Santrač with 20 goals.

In the summer of 1977, the owner of AEK Athens, Loukas Barlos was convinced to acquire Bajević, despite the injury problems the player had been facing. He made his debut with the yellow-black jersey on 18 December 1977 in AEK's 1–0 home win against Kastoria. Alongside Thomas Mavros, he formed one of the greatest attacking duo in the club's history. He scored his first goal on 8 January 1978 in a 1–1 away draw against PAOK. In the New Year's Eve of 1979, Bajević scored 4 goals against Panserraikos in a 5–0 home win. With AEK he won 2 Greek Championships and 1 Greek Cup, including a domestic double in 1978, while he was the league's top scorer for the 1979–80 season with 25 goals.

Bajević returned to Velež in the summer of 1981 where he played until 1983, when he retired at the age of 34.

== International career ==
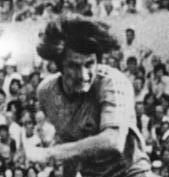
Bajević playing for Yugoslavia at the 1974 FIFA World Cup in West Germany

Bajević made his debut for Yugoslavia in April 1970, in a friendly match against Austria, in which game he immediately scored a goal, and has earned a total of 37 caps, scoring 29 goals. He played in the 1974 FIFA World Cup, where he scored three goals against Zaire. His final international was a May 1977 FIFA World Cup qualification match against Romania.

== Managerial career ==
=== Velež Mostar ===
After ending his football career in 1983, Bajević took over the role as manager of Velež. He led the team to win the Yugoslav Cup in 1986 by defeating Dinamo Zagreb 3–1 in the final. The next season Velež finished the league in second spot and Bajević went to Greece to manage AEK Athens.

=== AEK Athens ===
He took over AEK's managing position in 1988. During his first season in charge (1988–89), he guided the team to an unexpected championship after a ten-year drought, when he won it as a player. He then went on to win three consecutive championships (1992, 1993, 1994), one Greek Super Cup (1989), one League Cup (1990), one Pre-Mediterranean Cup (1991) and one Greek Cup (1996).

The club also had several decent campaigns in Europe under his management, reaching the last 16 in the following competitions: the European Cup (1990); the UEFA Cup (1992); the Champions League (1993) and (1995); and the Cup Winners' Cup (1996).

=== Olympiacos ===
In 1996, after eight successful seasons at AEK, Bajević moved to Olympiacos, bringing great hostility upon himself from the AEK supporters. Under Bajević, Olympiacos won their first championship in 1997 after ten sterile years, finishing 12 points ahead of AEK Athens and 20 points ahead of Panathinaikos. Also in 1997–98, Olympiacos participated for first time in the UEFA Champions League, finishing third in the group. In 1998 they were champions again after an important away win against Panathinaikos (0–2), finishing three points ahead of the greens. In 1999, Bajević led the team to a league-cup Double: in the league they ended 10 points ahead of AEK and 11 ahead of Panathinaikos; in the Cup, Olympiacos beat Panathinaikos 2–0. In the Champions League, the team finished top of the group, qualifying to the quarterfinals for the first (and only) time in their history and losing to Juventus 1–2 in Turin and drawing 1–1 at the Olympic Stadium. The fans had great expectations for the 1999–00 season with the additions of Giovanni and Zlatko Zahovič to the squad, but Bajević's team only achieved a 3rd place in the Champions League group stage. The head coach was sacked on 11 November 1999, despite Olympiacos holding the top spot in the league at the time.

=== PAOK ===
Bajević soon moved to Thessaloniki, where he had a decent spell at financially strapped PAOK. During his stay at the club, he won the Greek Cup in 2001 (after a near-thirty year wait) beating Οlympiakos 2–4 in Athens in a game in which his team delivered very high quality football.

=== Return to AEK ===
In the summer of 2002, Bajević returned to AEK. Fans were bitterly divided among those who accepted him and those who couldn't forgive his defection to Olympiacos. In the 2002–03 Champions League, AEK became the first and only team to collect six ties out of six games in the group phase and ended up at third position. A notable match was the 3–3 draw against reigning European champions Real Madrid at Nikos Goumas Stadium and another 2–2 draw against the Spaniards after coming back from 2–0 down at Santiago Bernabéu Stadium. Still, the antagonism with a section of AEK fans persisted. During a league match against Iraklis on 25 January 2004, Bajević decided he had enough abuse and with no prior warning left the bench and resigned while the game was still in the first half.

=== Return to Olympiacos ===
In 2004, he returned to Olympiacos, where he won the double yet again. Also, his team got very close to the second round of the Champions League by collecting ten points, but a 3–1 defeat against Liverpool in the last game eliminated them. Olympiacos went as far as the fourth round of the UEFA Cup. Despite these good results he resigned, mainly due to the pressure from Gate 7 fans who were not satisfied with the team's way of playing, although the majority of the fans were on his side.

=== Red Star Belgrade ===
On 25 May 2006, Bajević became the coach of the former European Cup champion Red Star Belgrade, brought in by club president Dragan Stojković as replacement for the recently departed Walter Zenga. The club's fans were optimistic about the appointment due to Bajević's reputation as an experienced coach with a good record in Greece.

As the Serbia-Montenegro league champion, Red Star began its European campaign in the Champions League qualifying. After easily disposing of Irish champions Cork City in the opening round, the next qualifying round saw them drawn against Carlo Ancelotti's powerhouse AC Milan featuring Kaká, Andrea Pirlo, Clarence Seedorf, Cafu, Gennaro Gattuso, Pippo Inzaghi, Billy Costacurta, etc., losing with an aggregate score of 1–3 thus continuing their European season in the second-tier UEFA Cup. Despite the defeat, many took some positives from the Milan clash. However, things were different when Slovan Liberec eliminated Red Star from the UEFA Cup first round by an embarrassing 1–4 aggregate score, including a 1–2 loss at home.

In contrast to European failures, the domestic form was satisfactory, as Red Star sat top of the league with 14 points to spare at the winter break. With the league restart, however, a 4–2 home loss on 24 February 2007 to eternal rival Partizan was followed on 27 February 2007 by an incident that saw angry fans smash the side window of Bajević's club-issued Toyota SUV with a brick while the vehicle was parked at the Marakana stadium parking lot during Bajević's guest appearance on the SOS kanal TV station.

The end of Bajević's stint with Red Star came in shocking fashion on 10 March 2007 during a league match versus Vojvodina. Red Star was down 0–2 at home, prompting its fans to start chanting "Dušan leave". Soon after the chant was picked up by the majority of the north stand where the club's most loyal supporters gather, Bajević decided to walk out on the team in the middle of the match, leaving the pitch in 70th minute. The match finished 0–3, shrinking Red Star's lead at the top of the table to only 6 points. Bajević's overall league record at the helm of Red Star during 2006–07 season was 14 league wins, 3 draws, and 3 losses.

=== Aris ===
On 7 September 2007, Bajević signed a 3-year contract with Aris. During the 2007–08 season, when he was the head coach of Aris, the team played superb football. Aris reached both a respectable 4th place in the Super League Greece and reached the Greek Cup final, where the team was beaten by Greek champions, Olympiacos with the score of 2–0. On 1 July 2008, he decided to resign, allegedly because Aris president Labros Skordas demanded that he bench star defender Avraam Papadopoulos, after the latter rejected a contract extension.

In the UEFA Cup, Aris made excellent performances, eliminating Real Zaragoza and beating 3–0 Bajević's old club Red Star Belgrade at home. Although, draws with Bolton and SC Braga and a 6–0 away loss to Bayern at Munich ended the team's dreams of progressing from the group stage.

After his resignation, he was immediately related with Panathinaikos, while there were reports that there was a contract to be pented by the side of Bajević. But he finally decided not to join the team, which eventually appointed Henk ten Cate. By the end of October, when the team of Panathinaikos was totally under-performing, and while ten Cate was on the verge of being sacked, the football manager of Panathinaikos, Kostas Antoniou was said to have asked once again Bajević to become the coach of the greens, but both sides rejected this relation.

=== AEK, third time ===
On 21 November 2008, Bajević made his second return to AEK Athens together with two other former players of AEK, Stelios Manolas in the position of the technical director and Lysandros Georgamlis as assistant coach. In his first interview since being re-appointed as the head coach of AEK, Bajević covered a range of issues including the squad he had inherited, his ambitions for the remainder of what has so far been a difficult season, the possibility of a return to the club's symbolic home ground—the Nikos Goumas Stadium at Nea Philadelphia—and about his well-documented contentious relationship with AEK fans. On a possible return of AEK returning to the Nikos Goumas Stadium, Bajević said: "It is my home because as a player and a manager I lived there", "I'm not the only one who wants a stadium at Nea Philadelphia – there are a lot of others who want it there." He then went on to discuss his relationship with the fans and Original 21, "I have said sorry to whoever I aggrieved and I say sorry again to everyone", "We can't afford to talk about it now though. We all love AEK. We need to forget the good and the bad and look forward".

His first game in charge was a 1–1 draw against OFI in Crete on 23 November 2008. The first season in his third spell in-charge of "Dikefalos Aetos" brought ups and downs. AEK in the league, finished 4th, thus qualifying for the seasons annual play-offs in which AEK finished 2nd meaning qualification for next seasons Europa League. Bajević managed to get AEK to the Greek Cup Final where they came up short handed as they lost 16–15 on penalties to Olympiacos after the game finished 4–4 after extra time.

On 7 August 2010 Bajević faced one of his worst moments in football. A section of AEK fans physically assaulted him following a friendly-game loss against to second division side Kallithea Bajević fell to the ground after being punched by the fans who surrounded the coach as he attempted to leave the pitch at the Gregoris Lambrakis Stadium following the 2–1 defeat. It was feared that the incidents in Kallithea would lead to Bajević's resignation, but due to overwhelming support from AEK management, players, and the majority of AEK fans, Bajević was convinced to stay on with the club. The video of the attack caused a worldwide shock, with many foreign media sources commenting on the lack of progress in stamping-out hooliganism at Greek football matches. Month-and-a-half later on 26 September 2010, Bajević resigned as head coach of AEK, following the 3–1 away defeat to Olympiacos Volos in the league.

=== Omonia ===
On 13 October 2010, Bajević signed a contract with Cypriot club Omonia, following the resignation of its predecessor Takis Lemonis. The coaching staff was also consisted of two training assistants, assistant coach Lysandros Georgamlis and physical fitness coach Dimitris Bourouzikas. The first game with Bajević sitting on the club's bench was scheduled on Monday, 18 October against Olympiakos Nicosia.

=== Return to Greece: Atromitos ===
On 2 June 2012, Bajević agreed on a two-year contract with Greek Cup finalist Atromitos. He came to replace Georgios Donis who resigned some days before. The Bosnian coach returned to Greece after a year and a half in order to manage the fifth Greek club in his career. He resigned his post on 22 December 2012 following the third round elimination in the Greek Cup to second-tier Olympiacos Volos that progressed on away goals following the injury time equalizer by Añete. In the league, Atromitos was holding the 4th spot after 15 matches.

=== Return to coaching after seven years: Bosnia and Herzegovina ===
On 21 December 2019, seventy-one-year-old Bajević was named new head coach of the Bosnia and Herzegovina national team, with a contract until the end of UEFA Euro 2020 should he qualify through the UEFA Euro 2020 qualifying play-offs before that. He extended his contract with the Bosnia and Herzegovina FA on 22 April 2020.

In his first game as head coach, Bajević's Bosnia made a good result after drawing against Italy in a 2020–21 UEFA Nations League A match on 4 September 2020. He suffered his first loss three days later, on 7 September, in another UEFA Nations League A match, this time against Poland. Bajević failed to qualify Bosnia for UEFA Euro 2020 after losing in a penalty shoot-out against Northern Ireland in the play-off semi finals on 8 October 2020. His contract ended following Bosnia's exit from the 2020–21 UEFA Nations League A.

== Administrative work ==
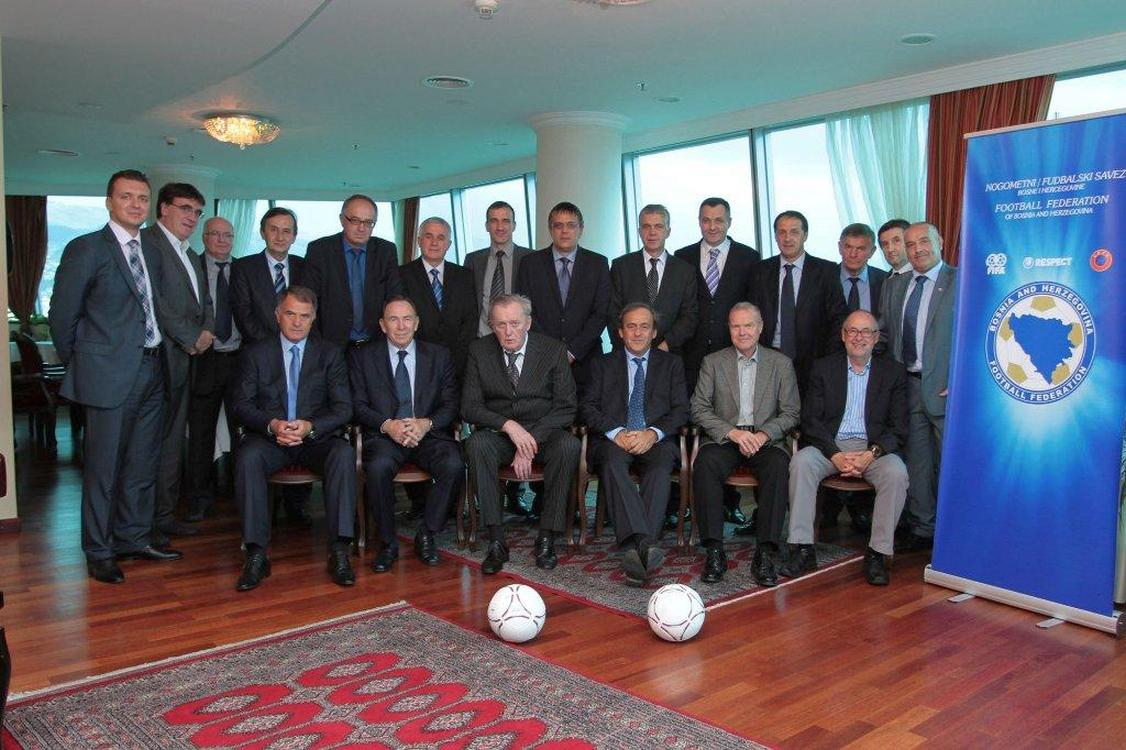
Bajević alongside Faruk Hadžibegić, Ivan Ćurković, Ivica Osim and Michel Platini among others, during his administrative work for the Bosnian Football Association in 2012

On 1 April 2011, after the Football Association of Bosnia and Herzegovina was suspended for two months from all international competitions by FIFA and UEFA, Bajević became part of its "normalization committee", an interim committee created to run the Bosnian Football Federation, and whose main purpose was to have the Federation approve the changes required by FIFA for the suspension to be lifted.

== Personal life ==
Bajević is of Bosnian Serb ethnicity. On 12 January 1995, he became a Greek citizen. Bajević is famous for his nickname "Princ sa Neretve". On 10 September 2008, he received the Sport Association of the City of Mostar Award for his contribution in popularization and development of football and sport in general in his city. On 20 February 2019, Bajević was awarded the 2018 Bosnia and Herzegovina Award for sports for his contribution in popularization and development of football in Bosnia and Herzegovina over the past years.

== Managerial statistics ==
Managerial record by team and tenure
Team	From	To	Record				
Team	From	To	G	W	D	L	Win %
Velež Mostar	1 July 1983	30 June 1987	152	66	42	44	43.42
AEK Athens	1 July 1988	26 June 1996	385	239	80	66	62.08
Olympiacos	26 June 1996	10 November 1999	157	113	22	22	71.97
PAOK	1 January 2000	8 May 2002	117	63	28	26	53.85
AEK Athens	20 May 2002	25 January 2004	82	45	23	14	54.88
Olympiacos	1 July 2004	30 June 2005	51	31	10	10	60.78
Red Star Belgrade	1 July 2006	10 March 2007	28	18	3	7	64.29
Aris	7 September 2007	30 June 2008	49	22	13	14	44.90
AEK Athens	21 November 2008	27 September 2010	84	39	23	22	46.43
Omonia	13 October 2010	14 April 2011	29	18	8	3	62.07
Atromitos	2 June 2012	23 December 2012	19	6	10	3	31.58
Bosnia and Herzegovina	21 December 2019	18 November 2020	8	0	3	5	0.00
Total			1,161	660	265	236	56.85

== Honours ==
=== Player ===
AEK Athens

- Alpha Ethniki: 1977–78, 1978–79
- Greek Cup: 1977–78

Velež Mostar

- Balkans Cup: 1980–81

Individual

- Yugoslav Footballer of the Year: 1972
- Yugoslav First League Top Goalscorer: 1969–70 (20 goals)
- Alpha Ethniki Top Goalscorer: 1979–80 (25 goals)
- Greek Cup Top Goalscorer: 1977–78, 1978–79
- Brazil Independence Cup 1972 Top Goalscorer

=== Manager ===
Velež Mostar

- Yugoslav Cup: 1985–86

AEK Athens

- Alpha Ethniki: 1988–89, 1991–92, 1992–93, 1993–94
- Greek Cup: 1995–96
- Greek League Cup: 1990
- Greek Super Cup: 1989

Olympiacos

- Alpha Ethniki: 1996–97, 1997–98, 1998–99, 2004–05
- Greek Cup: 1998–99, 2004–05

PAOK

- Greek Cup: 2000–01

Individual

- Super League Greece Manager of the Season: 1995–96, 1997–98, 1998–99, 2000–01, 2002–03, 2007–08

== See also ==
- List of football managers with the most matches
