= 2001–02 Alpha Ethniki =

66th season of top-tier football league in Greece

Alpha Ethniki
- Season: 2001–02
- Dates: 22 September 2001 – 8 May 2002
- Champions: Olympiacos; 31st Greek title
- Relegated: Ethnikos Asteras
- Champions League: Olympiacos; AEK Athens
- UEFA Cup: Panathinaikos; PAOK; Skoda Xanthi; Iraklis
- Intertoto Cup: Egaleo
- Matches: 182
- Goals: 524 (2.88 per match)
- Top goalscorer: Alexis Alexandris (19 goals)

The 2001–02 Alpha Ethniki was the 66th season of the highest football league of Greece. The season began on 22 September 2001 and ended on 8 May 2002. Olympiacos won their sixth consecutive and 31st Greek title.

== Teams ==
Promoted from 2000–01 Beta Ethniki	Relegated from 2000–01 Alpha Ethniki
Egaleo; Akratitos	PAS Giannina; Paniliakos; Kalamata; Athinaikos

=== Stadiums and personnel ===
Location of teams in 2001–02 Alpha Ethniki

Team	Manager^{1}	Location	Stadium	Capacity
AEK Athens	(Portugal) Fernando Santos	Athens (Nea Filadelfeia)	Nikos Goumas Stadium	27,729
Akratitos	(Greece) Georgios Paraschos	Athens (Ano Liosia)	Giannis Pathiakakis Stadium	4,944
Aris	(Germany) Bernd Krauss	Thessaloniki (Charilaou)	Kleanthis Vikelidis Stadium	23,220
Egaleo	(Greece) Georgios Chatzaras	Athens (Aigaleo)	Stavros Mavrothalassitis Stadium	8,217
Ethnikos Asteras	(Greece) Spyros Livathinos	Athens (Kaisariani)	Michalis Kritikopoulos Stadium	4,851
Ionikos	(Ukraine) Oleg Blokhin	Piraeus (Nikaia)	Neapoli Stadium	4,999
Iraklis	(Greece) Angelos Anastasiadis	Thessaloniki (Triandria)	Kaftanzoglio Stadium	27,560
OFI	(Greece) Ioannis Samaras	Heraklion	Theodoros Vardinogiannis Stadium	9,000
Olympiacos	(Greece) Takis Lemonis	Athens (Marousi)	Athens Olympic Stadium	69,638
Panachaiki	(Greece) Nikos Anastopoulos	Patras	Kostas Davourlis Stadium	11,321
Panathinaikos	(Uruguay) Sergio Markarián	Athens (Ampelokipoi)	Leoforos Alexandras Stadium	16,620
Panionios	(Romania) Dumitru Dumitriu	Athens (Nea Smyrni)	Nea Smyrni Stadium	11,756
PAOK	(Bosnia and Herzegovina) Dušan Bajević	Thessaloniki (Toumba)	Toumba Stadium	28,703
Skoda Xanthi	(Greece) Nikos Karageorgiou	Xanthi	Xanthi Ground	9,500

- ^{1} On final match day of the season, played on 8 May 2002.

== League table ==
Pos	Team	Pld	W	D	L	GF	GA	GD	Pts	Qualification or relegation
1	Olympiacos (C)	26	17	7	2	69	30	+39	58 (Note: Head-to-head record: AEK Athens–Olympiacos 2–3, Olympiacos–AEK Athens 4–3.)	Qualification for Champions League first group stage
2	AEK Athens	26	19	1	6	65	28	+37	58	Qualification for Champions League third qualifying round
3	Panathinaikos	26	16	7	3	53	25	+28	55	Qualification for UEFA Cup first round
4	PAOK	26	14	6	6	55	45	+10	48	Qualification for UEFA Cup first round
5	Skoda Xanthi	26	12	6	8	34	26	+8	42	Qualification for UEFA Cup first round
6	Iraklis	26	9	9	8	32	35	−3	36	Qualification for UEFA Cup first round
7	Panionios	26	8	11	7	37	33	+4	35	
8	OFI	26	9	6	11	32	35	−3	33	
9	Aris	26	7	8	11	25	34	−9	29	
10	Egaleo	26	7	5	14	27	46	−19	26	Qualification for Intertoto Cup third round
11	Akratitos	26	6	5	15	29	41	−12	23	
12	Ionikos	26	5	7	14	21	47	−26	22	
13	Panachaiki	26	3	9	14	26	55	−29	18	
14	Ethnikos Asteras (R)	26	4	5	17	19	44	−25	17	Relegation to Beta Ethniki

Source: Galanis Sports Data
Rules for classification: 1st points; 2nd head-to-head points; 3rd head-to-head goal difference; 4th decision match.
(C) Champions; (R) Relegated

== Results ==
Home \ Away	AEK	AKR	ARIS	EGA	ETA	ION	IRA	OFI	OLY	PNA	PAO	PGSS	PAOK	XAN
AEK Athens		3–0	4–2	4–0	1–0	4–0	3–0	3–0	2–3	4–1	2–0	2–1	6–2	2–0
Akratitos	0–1		0–1	0–1	1–0	2–0	3–0	1–2	2–3	3–1	0–0	1–4	1–2	2–0
Aris	0–3	0–1		1–0	4–2	1–0	1–1	1–0	1–5	1–1	0–0	1–1	2–3	1–1
Egaleo	1–3	2–1	0–0		1–0	2–2	2–1	0–0	3–4	2–1	1–4	0–1	2–1	1–0
Ethnikos Asteras	2–0	2–1	2–2	1–0		1–0	1–2	2–3	2–4	1–1	1–2	0–2	1–3	0–0
Ionikos	1–2	2–1	1–0	1–1	1–0		1–1	2–1	0–2	0–2	0–2	1–1	1–1	1–1
Iraklis	3–2	1–1	2–1	2–0	0–0	3–0		1–1	1–1	3–0	2–1	1–1	3–1	1–1
OFI	0–1	1–0	1–2	2–1	2–0	4–0	1–0		1–1	2–2	0–1	0–0	4–1	0–1
Olympiacos	4–3	2–2	0–1	3–0	6–0	5–0	3–0	3–0		4–0	2–2	2–0	3–2	1–1
Panachaiki	0–1	1–1	1–0	5–3	0–0	0–2	1–1	1–2	1–3		0–0	1–1	3–3	1–3
Panathinaikos	2–0	1–0	2–1	2–1	1–0	5–3	2–1	5–1	1–1	8–0		2–1	1–2	3–1
Panionios	2–6	2–2	1–0	0–0	4–0	2–2	0–1	1–1	3–1	2–0	2–2		1–1	2–0
PAOK	3–2	6–3	1–1	3–1	2–1	2–0	3–0	3–2	1–1	3–2	2–2	3–1		1–0
Skoda Xanthi	1–1	3–0	1–0	4–2	1–0	1–0	4–1	2–1	1–2	2–0	1–2	3–1	1–0	

Source: Worldfootball.net
Legend: Blue = home team win; Yellow = draw; Red = away team win.

== Top scorers ==
Source: Galanis Sports Data

Rank	Player	Club	Goals
1	(Greece) Alexis Alexandris	Olympiacos	19
2	(Greece) Demis Nikolaidis	AEK Athens	17
3	(Greece) Vasilios Tsiartas	AEK Athens	16
4	(Greece) Georgios Georgiadis	PAOK	15
5	(Morocco) Abderrahim Ouakili	Skoda Xanthi	14
6	(Croatia) Goran Vlaović	Panathinaikos	13
6	(Serbia and Montenegro) Predrag Đorđević	Olympiacos	13
8	(Brazil) Ederson Fofonka	Iraklis	12
9	(Costa Rica) Rónald Gómez	OFI	11
9	(Greece) Stelios Giannakopoulos	Olympiacos	11

== Awards ==
=== Annual awards ===
Annual awards were announced on 4 November 2002.

Award	Winner	Club
Greek Player of the Season	(Greece) Demis Nikolaidis	AEK Athens
Foreign Player of the Season	(Serbia) Predrag Đorđević	Olympiacos
Young Player of the Season	(Greece) Spyros Vallas	Skoda Xanthi
Goalkeeper of the Season	(Greece) Antonios Nikopolidis	Panathinaikos
Fair Play of the Season	(Greece) Stelios Giannakopoulos (Greece) Michalis Kasapis	Olympiacos; AEK Athens
Golden Boot	(Greece) Alexis Alexandris	Olympiacos
Manager of the Season	(Portugal) Fernando Santos	AEK Athens

== Attendances ==
Olympiacos drew the highest average home attendance in the 2001–02 Alpha Ethniki.

#	Team	Average attendance
1	Olympiacos	20,279
2	Panathinaikos	10,776
3	PAOK	10,068
4	AEK Athens	8,248
5	Iraklis	6,790
6	Panachaiki	4,458
7	Aris	4,374
8	OFI	3,030
9	Panionios	2,960
10	Skoda Xanthi	2,323
11	Ethnikos Asteras	2,279
12	Akratitos	1,274
13	Ionikos	1,248
14	Egaleo	886
