= 2002–03 Alpha Ethniki =

67th season of top-tier football league in Greece

Alpha Ethniki
- Season: 2002–03
- Dates: 24 August 2002 – 24 May 2003
- Champions: Olympiacos; 32nd Greek title
- Relegated: Panachaiki; PAS Giannina
- Champions League: Olympiacos; Panathinaikos; AEK Athens
- UEFA Cup: PAOK; Panionios; Aris
- Matches: 240
- Goals: 617 (2.57 per match)
- Top goalscorer: Nikos Liberopoulos (16 goals)

The 2002–03 Alpha Ethniki was the 67th season of the highest football league in Greece. The season began on 24 August 2002 and ended on 25 May 2003. Olympiacos won their seventh consecutive and 32nd Greek title. Olympiacos and Panathinaikos finished the League with the same points total but Olympiacos were crowned champions due to more favourable results between the two teams. It was a very dramatic end to the season, with the decisive game between the two clubs taking place in the penultimate round. The season was interrupted by strike action after television broadcaster Alpha Digital collapsed in September 2002, following which the players didn't play for a month.

== Teams ==
Promoted from 2001–02 Beta Ethniki	Relegated from 2001–02 Alpha Ethniki
PAS Giannina; Kallithea; Proodeftiki	Ethnikos Asteras

=== Stadiums and personnel ===
Location of teams in 2002–03 Alpha Ethniki

Team	Manager^{1}	Location	Stadium	Capacity
AEK Athens	(Bosnia and Herzegovina) Dušan Bajević	Athens (Nea Filadelfeia)	Nikos Goumas Stadium	27,729
Akratitos	(Romania) Dumitru Dumitriu	Athens (Ano Liosia)	Giannis Pathiakakis Stadium	4,944
Aris	(Greece) Georgios Firos	Thessaloniki (Charilaou)	Kleanthis Vikelidis Stadium	22,800
Egaleo	(Greece) Georgios Chatzaras	Athens (Aigaleo)	Stavros Mavrothalassitis Stadium	8,217
Ionikos	(Poland) Jacek Gmoch	Piraeus (Nikaia)	Neapoli Stadium	4,999
Iraklis	(Netherlands) Eugène Gerards	Thessaloniki (Efkarpia)	Makedonikos Stadium	8,100
Kallithea	(Greece) Babis Tennes	Athens (Kallithea)	Grigoris Lambrakis Stadium	4,250
OFI	(Czech Republic) Zdeněk Ščasný	Heraklion	Theodoros Vardinogiannis Stadium	9,000
Olympiacos	(Ukraine) Oleh Protasov	Athens (Rizoupoli)	Georgios Kamaras Stadium	14,856
Panachaiki	(Greece) Dimitrios Genas	Patras	Kostas Davourlis Stadium	11,321
Panathinaikos	(Uruguay) Sergio Markarián	Athens (Ampelokipoi)	Leoforos Alexandras Stadium	16,620
Panionios	(Slovakia) Jozef Bubenko	Athens (Nea Smyrni)	Nea Smyrni Stadium	11,756
PAOK	(Greece) Angelos Anastasiadis	Thessaloniki (Toumba)	Toumba Stadium	28,703
PAS Giannina	(Greece) Nikos Anastopoulos	Ioannina	Zosimades Stadium	7,652
Proodeftiki	(Greece) Soulis Papadopoulos	Piraeus (Nikaia)	Nikaia Municipal Stadium	5,000
Skoda Xanthi	(Greece) Nikos Karageorgiou	Xanthi	Xanthi Ground	9,500

- ^{1} On final match day of the season, played on 25 May 2003.

== League table ==
Pos	Team	Pld	W	D	L	GF	GA	GD	Pts	Qualification or relegation
1	Olympiacos (C)	30	21	7	2	75	21	+54	70 (Note: Head-to-head points (goal difference): Olympiacos 3 (+2), Panathinaikos 3 (-2).)	Qualification for Champions League group stage
2	Panathinaikos	30	22	4	4	50	19	+31	70	Qualification for Champions League group stage
3	AEK Athens	30	21	5	4	74	29	+45	68	Qualification for Champions League third qualifying round
4	PAOK	30	16	5	9	59	38	+21	53 (Note: Head-to-head points (goal difference): PAOK 3 (+1), Panionios 3 (-1).)	Qualification for UEFA Cup first round
5	Panionios	30	15	8	7	35	25	+10	53	Qualification for UEFA Cup first round
6	Aris	30	15	6	9	37	34	+3	51	Qualification for UEFA Cup first round
7	Iraklis	30	15	4	11	44	37	+7	49	
8	OFI	30	12	8	10	39	34	+5	44	
9	Skoda Xanthi	30	8	11	11	31	33	−2	35	
10	Egaleo	30	7	10	13	28	44	−16	31	Qualification for Intertoto Cup third round
11	Proodeftiki	30	7	9	14	25	38	−13	30	
12	Akratitos	30	7	5	18	33	62	−29	26 (Note: Head-to-head points: Akratitos 4, Kallithea 1.)	Qualification for Intertoto Cup second round
13	Kallithea	30	6	8	16	29	46	−17	26	
14	Ionikos (O)	30	5	9	16	22	42	−20	24	Qualification for Relegation play-off
15	Panachaiki (R)	30	1	6	23	11	71	−60	9	Relegation to Beta Ethniki
16	PAS Giannina (Note: PAS Giannina were deducted 90 points (3 points per match) for having debts of €900,000 to former players.) (R)	30	6	7	17	25	44	−19	−65	Relegation to Beta Ethniki

Source: Galanis Sports Data
Rules for classification: 1) Points; 2) Head-to-head points; 3) Head-to-head goal difference; 4) Goal difference; 5) Goals scored; 6) Goals against; 7) Play-offs (neutral ground); 8) Draw.
(Note: Criterion 7 is only used if needed to decide champion, teams for relegation or teams for UEFA competitions).
(C) Champions; (O) Play-off winners; (R) Relegated

== Results ==
Home \ Away	AEK	AKR	ARIS	EGA	ION	IRA	KLT	OFI	OLY	PNA	PAO	PGSS	PAOK	PAS	PRO	XAN
AEK Athens		6–2	4–0	3–2	3–0	6–1	1–0	3–1	1–1	6–0	1–0	4–2	3–4	3–1	4–1	3–2
Akratitos	3–2		0–2	0–1	1–0	0–2	3–3	1–1	2–5	3–0	1–3	0–3	1–3	3–0	2–1	0–1
Aris	1–1	4–1		2–1	2–0	2–1	1–1	1–1	0–0	1–1	1–3	1–0	2–0	2–0	2–1	1–1
Egaleo	1–1	3–1	3–0		0–0	0–2	0–0	0–4	0–2	4–0	0–0	0–0	2–3	2–1	1–0	0–0
Ionikos	0–3	1–1	0–1	0–0		2–4	1–1	1–1	0–2	3–0	0–1	1–2	4–0	2–0	0–1	0–0
Iraklis	0–2	1–0	4–0	2–1	3–2		2–1	3–0	2–2	1–1	0–3	3–1	1–1	3–0	1–0	2–0
Kallithea	1–3	0–2	0–2	2–1	0–1	1–0		2–0	1–4	3–1	1–3	1–1	1–2	2–2	1–1	0–1
OFI	1–0	2–0	1–2	2–2	2–1	3–1	2–1		0–1	3–0	0–2	1–1	2–3	1–0	2–0	2–0
Olympiacos	1–2	4–0	1–0	4–0	6–0	2–1	1–0	1–0		7–0	3–0	3–0	4–3	2–1	0–0	1–1
Panachaiki	0–2	2–0	0–1	0–2	0–0	0–2	1–2	0–2	1–4		0–3	0–2	2–2	0–2	1–1	0–2
Panathinaikos	2–1	3–1	3–2	3–0	1–0	2–0	1–0	5–1	3–2	2–0		1–0	1–0	1–0	0–1	1–0
Panionios	1–1	1–1	1–0	1–0	2–0	3–1	2–0	0–0	0–0	2–0	0–0		2–0	2–0	2–0	0–3
PAOK	0–1	1–1	2–0	4–0	3–0	0–1	2–3	2–0	1–1	4–0	4–1	3–0		1–0	4–1	1–0
PAS Giannina	0–2	1–0	0–1	1–1	2–3	0–0	1–0	0–0	0–3	3–0	0–0	1–2	3–2		2–1	1–1
Proodeftiki	1–1	5–1	3–1	1–1	0–0	1–0	1–1	0–0	1–3	1–0	0–2	0–1	0–3	1–0		1–1
Skoda Xanthi	0–1	1–2	0–2	5–0	0–0	1–0	3–0	1–4	1–5	1–1	0–0	0–1	1–1	3–3	1–0	

Source: Worldfootball.net
Legend: Blue = home team win; Yellow = draw; Red = away team win.

== Relegation play-off ==
1 June 2003

Ionikos	2–1	Apollon Kalamarias
Rodrigues 47', 78'	Report	Hartwig 77'

Volos Municipal Stadium, Volos
Attendance: 3,000
Referee: Giorgos Kasnaferis (Athens)

Ionikos retained their spot in 2003–04 Alpha Ethniki. Apollon Kalamarias placed on 2003–04 Beta Ethniki

== Top scorers ==
Source: Galanis Sports Data

Rank	Player	Club	Goals
1	(Greece) Nikos Liberopoulos	Panathinaikos	16
2	(Greece) Stelios Giannakopoulos	Olympiacos	15
3	(Greece) Georgios Georgiadis	PAOK	14
3	(Serbia and Montenegro) Predrag Đorđević	Olympiacos	14
5	(The Gambia) Njogu Demba-Nyrén	Aris	12
5	(Greece) Vasilios Lakis	AEK Athens	12
5	(Greece) Demis Nikolaidis	AEK Athens	12
8	(Cyprus) Ioannis Okkas	PAOK	11
8	(Greece) Vasilios Tsiartas	AEK Athens	11
10	(Brazil) Alessandro Soares	OFI	10
10	(Greece) Dimitris Nalitzis	AEK Athens	10
10	(Brazil) Giovanni	Olympiacos	10
10	(Greece) Lampros Choutos	Olympiacos	10

== Awards ==
=== Annual awards ===
Annual awards were announced on 10 November 2003.

Award	Winner	Club
Greek Player of the Season	(Greece) Stelios Giannakopoulos	Olympiacos
Foreign Player of the Season	(Serbia and Montenegro) Predrag Đorđević	Olympiacos
Young Player of the Season	(Greece) Vangelis Mantzios	Panionios
Goalkeeper of the Season	(Greece) Antonios Nikopolidis	Panathinaikos
Golden Boot	(Greece) Nikos Liberopoulos	Panathinaikos
Manager of the Season	(Bosnia and Herzegovina) Dušan Bajević	AEK Athens

== Attendances ==
Panathinaikos drew the highest average home attendance in the 2002–03 Alpha Ethniki.

#	Team	Average attendance
1	Panathinaikos	8,093
2	Olympiacos	8,078
3	PAOK	7,065
4	AEK Athens	5,178
5	Aris	4,317
6	Panionios	2,976
7	PAS Giannina	2,336
8	OFI	2,218
9	Iraklis	2,123
10	Skoda Xanthi	1,880
11	Kallithea	1,544
12	Egaleo	1,301
13	Proodeftiki	1,297
14	Panachaiki	1,287
15	Ionikos	1,159
16	Akratitos	858
