= List of Olympiacos F.C. players =

Olympiacos Football Club are a Greek professional association football club based in Piraeus, Attica, who currently play in the Super League Greece. They have played at their current home ground, Karaiskaki, since their foundation in 1925. Olympiacos entered the Piraeus FCA in their first season, winning the league 3 times in a row 1925–1928.

Olympiacos was founded on March 10, 1925, in the port of Piraeus, when the members of Peiraikos Podosfairikos Omilos (Sport and Football Club of Piraeus) decided, during a historical assembly, to dissolve the two clubs in order to establish a unified new one, with an emblem depicting the profile of an Ancient Olympic Games winner. Notis Kamberos announced the name Olympiacos and Michalis Manouskos completed it to its full name, Olympiacos Syndesmos Filathlon Pireos. The Andrianopoulos brothers, however, were those who significantly raised the reputation of the club and added glory to it. Members of a prosperous family, they made the name of Olympiacos known over Greece. Jimmy, Dinos, Giorgos and Vassilis were the first to play. Leonidas made his appearance later on and played for a short time. The club's offensive line, made up of the five brothers, soon became legendary. Olympiacos immediately caught the attention of locals, back then their fanbase consisted mainly of the working class, with the team filling the Piraeus Velodrome, present day Karaiskakis Stadium and becoming EPSP Champions (Enosi Podosferikon Somation Pireos – Regional Championship in Peiraias) the seasons 1925,1926,1927

In 1926, the Hellenic Football Federation was founded and organized the Panhellenic Championship, the 1927–1928 season, the first national championship, were the regional champions from EPSA league (Athens), EPSP league (Peiraias) and EPSM league (Thessaloniki) compete for the national title through play-offs with Aris FC becoming the first champion. Up to 1958–59 the Panhellenic Championship was organized this way however the following season (1928–29) Olympiacos came to a dispute with the Hellenic Football Federation and did not participate in the championship with Panathinaikos and AEK Athens decided to follow Olympiacos and did the same. During that season they played friendly games with each other and together formed a group called P.O.K.. The second Panhellenic Championship took place in 1929–30 and the 3rd found Olympiacos winning the Greek national league title, the 1930–31 season, for the first time in his history. It was going to be a very successful era. Since that time the club's first team has competed in numerous nationally and internationally organised competitions.

All players who have played in official matches are listed.

== Most Appearances ==
Top 10 Most Capped Players

Rank	Player	Nationality	App
1	Predrag Đorđević	(Serbia)	493
2	Kyriakos Karataidis	(Greece)	446
3	Georgios Anatolakis	(Greece)	364
4	Kostas Fortounis	(Greece)	350
5	Alexis Alexandris	(Greece)	333
6	Kostas Polychroniou	(Greece)	305
7	Dimitris Mavrogenidis	(Greece)	304
8	Giorgos Sideris	(Greece)	285
9	Georgios Amanatidis	(Greece)	284
10	Vassilis Karapialis	(Greece)	277

== All Time Top Scorers ==
Top 10 Goalscorers

Rank	Player	Nationality	Goals
1	Giorgos Sideris	(Greece)	224
2	Nikos Anastopoulos	(Greece)	197
3	Alexis Alexandris	(Greece)	170
4	Predrag Đorđević	(Serbia)	157
5	Giovanni	(Brazil)	97
6	Youssef El-Arabi	(Morocco)	94
7	Kostas Fortounis	(Greece)	94
8	Stelios Giannakopoulos	(Greece)	87
9	Kostas Mitroglou	(Greece)	82
10	Ayoub El Kaabi	(Morocco)	82

== Key ==
†	Club captains who have won a major Senior competition (competitions noted in notes section)
*	Club record holder
¤	Played their full career at Olympiacos

=== Greece ===
- (Greece) Giorgos Gripeos 1962
- (Greece) Georgios Andrianopoulos 1929–31
- (Greece) Vasilios Andrianopoulos 1929–33
- (Greece) Leonidas Andrianopoulos 1929–36
- (Greece) Christoforos Ragos 1929–36, 1937–40
- (Greece) Giannis Vazos 1931–49
- (Greece) Theologos Symeonidis 1932–46
- (Greece) Spyros Depountis 1934–36, 1938–46
- (Greece) Stelios Christopoulos 1947–53
- (Greece) Giorgos Darivas 1948–57
- (Greece) Babis Drosos 1948–58
- (Greece) Babis Kotridis 1949–52, 1953–61
- (Greece) Thanasis Bebis 1950–53, 1954–63
- (Greece) Themis Moustaklis 1953–58
- (Greece) Giannis Ioannou 1953–60
- (Greece) Elias Yfantis 1953–64
- (Greece) Kostas Polychroniou 1954–68
- (Greece) Antonis Poseidon 1956–64
- (Greece) Stelios Psychos 1957–63
- (Greece) Konstantinos Papazoglou 1957–64
- (Greece) Aris Papazoglou 1959–67
- (Greece) Giorgos Sideris 1959–70, 1971–72
- (Greece) Dimitrios Stefanakos 1958–65
- (Greece) Pavlos Grigoriadis 1962–65
- (Greece) Pavlos Vasileiou 1963–70
- (Greece) Grigoris Aganian 1964–71
- (Greece) Vasilis Botinos 1964–72
- (Greece) Nikos Gioutsos 1964–74
- (Greece) Vasilis Siokos 1968–78
- (Greece) Georgios Delikaris 1969–78
- (Greece) Petros Karavitis 1970–81
- (Greece) Michalis Kritikopoulos 1973–80
- (Greece) Babis Stavropoulos 1973–78
- (Greece) Kostas Davourlis 1974–77
- (Greece) "Maik" Galakos 1973–81
- (Greece) Meletis Persias 1976–85
- (Greece) Nikos Vamvakoulas 1977–85
- (Greece) Vangelis Kousoulakis 1979–86
- (Greece) Giorgos Kokolakis 1979–88
- (Greece) Konstantinos Orfanos 1980–85
- (Greece) Nikos Anastopoulos 1980–87, 1989–92, 1993–94
- (Greece) Tasos Mitropoulos 1981–92, 1997–98
- (Greece) Giorgos Vaitsis 1985–88, 1991–94
- (Greece) Petros Marinakis 1994-96
- (Greece) Sakis Moustakidis 1987–90
- (Greece) Sotiris Mavromatis 1988–95
- (Greece) Panagiotis Sofianopoulos 1987–94
- (Greece) Giotis Tsalouchidis 1987–96
- (Greece) Nikos Tsiantakis 1987–96
- (Greece) Minas Hantzidis 1987–96
- (Greece) Theodoros Pachatouridis 1987–96
- (Greece) Vassilis Karapialis 1991-00
- (Greece) Alexandros Alexandris 1994-03
- (Greece) Grigoris Georgatos 1995–99, 2000–01, 2003–07
- (Greece) Stelios Giannakopoulos 1996-03
- (Greece) Andreas Niniadis 1996-03
- (Greece) Lambros Choutos 1999-04
- (Greece) Ieroklis Stoltidis 2003–10
- (Greece) Kostas Mitroglou 2007–10, 2012–14, 2014–15
- (Greece) Savvas Kofidis 1988–92
- (Greece) Dinos Andrianopoulos
- (Greece) Yiannis Andrianopoulos 1925–29
- (Greece) Stelios Andrianopoulos
- (Greece) Georgios Anatolakis 1997-07
- (Greece) Achilleas Grammatikopoulos 1928-44
- (Greece) Dimitrios Eleftheropoulos 1994-04
- (Greece) Fanis Katergiannakis 2002-04
- (Greece) Nikos Dabizas 1994-98
- (Greece) Nikos Kambolis 1957-62
- (Greece) Kyriakos Karataidis 1988-01
- (Greece) Ioannis Kyrastas 1972-81
- (Greece) Andreas Mouratis 1940-45
- (Greece) Takis Lemonis 1978–87
- (Greece) Takis Synetopoulos
- (Greece) Ilias Rosidis 1948–61
- (Greece) Giannis Gaitatzis 1963-77
- (Greece) Petros Michos 1978–88, 1991–92
- (Greece) (Cape Verde) Daniel Batista 1992–95
- (Greece) Antonis Tzanetoulakos
- (Greece) Ioannis Fetfatzidis 2009–13, 2018–19
- (Greece) Stylianos Venetidis 2001–06
- (Greece) Stelios Kourkouklatos
- (Greece) Takis Gonias 1992–96, 2003–04
- (Greece) Dimitris Kokkinakis
- (Greece) Kostas Lolios
- (Greece) Christos Arvanitis
- (Greece) Dimitris Mavrogenidis 1997–06
- (Greece) Georgios Galitsios 2008–11
- (Greece) Avraam Papadopoulos 2008–14, 2019–22
- (Greece) Christos Patsatzoglou 2000–09
- (Greece) Anastasios Pantos 2003–10
- (Greece) Giannis Papadopoulos 2008–11
- (Greece) Vasilis Torosidis 2007–13, 2018–20
- (Greece) Antonios Nikopolidis 2004–11
- (Greece) Kyriakos Papadopoulos 2007–10
- (Greece) Paraskevas Antzas 1998–03, 2007–09
- (Greece) Georgios Amanatidis 1993–03
- (Greece) Ilias Poursanidis 1997–03
- (Greece) Charalambos Pezonis
- (Greece) Thanasis Kostoulas 1999–07
- (Greece) Giannis Taralidis 2003–07
- (Greece) Michalis Kapsis 2005-07
- (Greece) Alexandros Kaklamanos 1995–97
- (Greece) Alekos Rantos 1988–98
- (Greece) Kleopas Giannou 1999–07
- (Greece) Antonis Antoniadis 1978–79
- (Greece) Dimitris Synetopoulos 1970–78
- (Greece) Michalis Sifakis 2007–08
- (Greece) Michalis Milonas 1969–73
- (Greece) Andreas Bonovas 1986–88
- (Greece) George Kostikos 1986–87
- (Greece) Petros Passalis 1994–01
- (Greece) Petros Kanellos 1978–82
- (Greece) Alexandros Tatsis 2003–04
- (Greece) Nikos Sarganis 1980–85
- (Greece) Stavros Papadopoulos
- (Greece) Peter Vlowianitis
- (Greece) Alekos Chatzistavridis 1944–49
- (Greece) Giannis Maniatis 2011–16
- (Greece) Andreas Samaris 2013–14
- (Greece) José Holebas 2010–14, 2020–21
- (Greece) Dimitris Kolovos 2013–17
- (Greece) Tasos Avlonitis 2014–15
- (Greece) Dimitris Siovas 2012–17
- (Greece) Kostas Fortounis 2014–24, 2026–
- (Greece) Charalambos Lykogiannis 2011–15
- (Greece) Andreas Bouchalakis 2013–23
- (Greece) Kostas Tsimikas 2014–2020
- (Greece) Andreas Gianniotis 2012–17, 2018–19
- (Greece) Panagiotis Vlachodimos 2012–15
- (Greece) Dimitrios Diamantakos 2012–16
- (Greece) Kostas Manolas 2012–14, 2022
- (Greece) Panagiotis Retsos 2016–17, 2022–
- (Greece) Thanasis Androutsos 2016–25
- (Greece) Leonardo Koutris 2017–22
- (Greece) Marios Vrousai 2018–24
- (Greece) Lazaros Christodoulopoulos 2018–20
- (Greece) Georgios Masouras 2019–26
- (Greece) Sokratis Papastathopoulos 2021–23
- (Greece) Alexandros Paschalakis 2022–26
- (Greece) Sotiris Alexandropoulos 2023–24
- (Greece) Alexandros Anagnostopoulos 2024–25
- (Greece) Antonis Papakanellos 2024–
- (Greece) Nikolaos Lolis 2025–
- (Greece) Alexis Kalogeropoulos 2021–26
- (Greece) Argyris Liatsikouras 2025–
- (Greece) Stavros Pnevmonidis 2025–
- (Greece) Konstantinos Tzolakis 2019–26
- (Greece) Andreas Ntoi 2022–2025
- (Greece) Christos Mouzakitis 2024–
- (Greece) Charalampos Kostoulas 2024–25
- (Greece) Dimitrios Stournaras 2026–

=== South & North America ===
- (Brazil) Giovanni 1999–05
- (Brazil) Rivaldo 2004–07
- (Brazil) Marcelo 2022–23
- (Brazil) Rodinei 2023–26
- (Brazil) Willian 2024
- (Brazil) Zé Elias 2000–03
- (Brazil) Luciano de Souza 1998–01
- (Brazil) Edu Dracena 2002–03
- (Brazil) Guilherme 2018–20
- (Brazil) Leandro Salino 2013–16
- (Brazil) Sebá 2015–19
- (Brazil) Bruno Viana 2016–18
- (Brazil) Felipe Santana 2015
- (Brazil) Rafinha 2020–21
- (Brazil) Júlio César 2006–08
- (Brazil) Leonardo 2008–11
- (Brazil) Dudu Cearense 2008–11
- (Brazil) Tiquinho Soares 2021–22
- (Brazil) Diogo 2009–13
- (Brazil) Alexandre D'Acol 2004–07
- (Brazil) Leozinho 2007–08
- (Brazil) Gustavo Mancha 2025–
- (Brazil) Ramon 2023–25
- (Brazil) Bruno 2019–21
- (Brazil) Gabriel Strefezza 2025–26
- (Brazil) Wanderson 2009–12
- (Brazil) Leandro 2007–12
- (Brazil) Chumbinho 2010–14
- (Brazil) Clayton 2026–
- (Brazil) Edvaldo 1989–90
- (Brazil) Gustavo Scarpa 2023
- (Brazil) André Luiz 2026
- (Brazil) Igor Silva 2018–20
- (Uruguay) Julio Losanta 1972–80
- (Uruguay) Jorge Walter Barrios 1985–87
- (Uruguay) Vicente Estavillio 1981–83
- (Uruguay) Milton Viera 1972–77
- (Uruguay) Gabriel Alvez 2000–02
- (Uruguay) Diego Aguirre 1988
- (Uruguay) Ignatio Peña 1974–75
- (Uruguay) Rafael Perone 1978–80
- (Argentina) Esteban Cambiasso 2015–17
- (Argentina) Juan Gilberto Funes 1988–89
- (Argentina) Gabriel Schurrer 2004–06
- (Argentina) Luciano Galletti 2007–10
- (Argentina) Javier Saviola 2013–14
- (Argentina) Franco Soldano 2019–22
- (Argentina) Nicolás Freire 2023–24
- (Argentina) Alejandro Domínguez 2013–17
- (Argentina) Ariel Ibagaza 2010–14
- (Argentina) Maximiliano Lovera 2019–24
- (Argentina) Franco Jara 2015
- (Argentina) Santiago Hezze 2023–
- (Argentina) Tomas De Vincenti 2013–14
- (Argentina) Pablo Maffeo 2026–
- (Argentina) Jesus Datolo 2010
- (Argentina) Franco Costanzo 2011–12
- (Argentina) Lorenzo Scipioni 2025–
- (Argentina) Francisco Ortega 2023–26
- (Argentina) Fernando Belluschi 2007–09
- (Argentina) Sebastian Leto 2008–09
- (Argentina) Cristian Raúl Ledesma 2007–10
- (Argentina) Leonel Núñez 2007–08
- (Argentina) (Greece) Rodrigo Archubi 2007
- (Argentina) Antonio Justo Alcibar 1972–73
- (Argentina) Alberto José Poletti 1972–73
- (Argentina) Miguel Alberto Nicolau 1972–73
- (Argentina) Vicente Monje 2011–12
- (Argentina) Nicolás Martínez 2015–18
- (Colombia) James Rodríguez 2022–23
- (Colombia) Jorge Bermúdez 2001–03
- (Colombia) Gustavo Puerta 2026–
- (Colombia) Felipe Pardo 2015–19
- (Colombia) Juan Pablo Pino 2013
- (Chile) Fabian Estay 1993–95
- (Chile) Pablo Contreras 2012–13
- (Paraguay) Óscar Cardozo 2016–17
- (Paraguay) Nelson Valdez 2014
- (Paraguay) Hernán Pérez 2014
- (Paraguay) Jorge Benítez 2014–16
- (Ecuador) Félix Borja 2006–08
- (Ecuador) Juan Carlos Paredes 2017
- (Ecuador) Jackson Porozo 2023–24
- (Mexico) Nery Castillo 2000–07
- (Mexico) Armando González 2026–
- (Mexico) Alan Pulido 2015–16
- (Costa Rica) Joel Campbell 2013–14
- (Jamaica) Leon Bailey 2026–
- (Honduras) Luis Palma 2025
- (Canada) Igor Vrablic 1986–87
- (United States) Konrad de la Fuente 2022–23
- (United States) (Greece) Peter Philipakos 2004–05
- (United States) (Greece) Peter Skouras 1984–85
- (United States) (Greece) Gus Kartes 1996–00

=== Europe ===
- (Cyprus) Ioannis Okkas 2004–07
- (Cyprus) Michalis Konstantinou 2005–08
- (Cyprus) Pavlos Vasiliou 1963–70
- (Cyprus) (Spain) Urko Rafael Pardo 2009–11
- (Cyprus) (Serbia) Siniša Gogić 1997–00
- (Cyprus) Georgios Christodoulou 1990–93
- (Cyprus) Stavros Papadopoulos 1977–86
- (Cyprus) Kyriakos Koureas 1970–73
- (Cyprus) Pamboulis Papadopoulos 1971–76
- (Cyprus) Leonidas Leonidou 1970–71
- (Cyprus) Constantinos Laifis 2016–18 (all time on-loan)
- (Cyprus) Ioannis Kosti 2020–24 (youth team)
- (Germany) Marko Marin 2016–18
- (Germany) Herbert Neumann 1983–84
- (Germany) Stefan Ortega 2026–
- (Germany) Thomas Rohrbach 1978–80
- (Germany) Denis Epstein 2010–11 (all time on-loan)
- (England) Matt Derbyshire 2009–11
- (England) Josh Bowler 2022–23
- (England) Omar Richards 2023–24
- (England) Nelson Abbey 2024–25
- (Northern Ireland) Derek Spence 1978
- (Northern Ireland) Roy Carroll 2012–14
- (Scotland) Jordan Holsgrove 2023–24 (all time on-loan)
- (France) Christian Karembeu 2001–04
- (France) Eric Abidal 2014
- (France) Yann M'Vila 2020–23
- (France) Didier Domi 2006–10
- (France) François Modesto 2011–13
- (France) Giulian Biancone 2023–26
- (France) Aly Cissokho 2017
- (France) Bobby Allain 2019–20
- (France) Rémy Cabella 2025–26
- (France) Abdoulaye Dabo 2022–23
- (France) Claude Dielna 2012–15 (all time on-loan)
- (France) Mathieu Valbuena 2019–23
- (France) Kenny Lala 2021–22
- (France) Étienne Youte Kinkoue 2021–23 (youth team)
- (France) Bandiougou Fadiga 2022–24
- (France) Rolland Courbis 1973–74
- (France) (Greece) Yves Triantafyllos 1971–74
- (France) (Greece) Romain Argyroudis 1971–73
- (Switzerland) Pajtim Kasami 2014–17, 2022–23
- (Switzerland) Remo Freuler 2026–
- (Switzerland) (Greece) Agapios Kaltaveridis 1988–89
- (Austria) (Greece) Peter Persidis 1971–75
- (Austria) Kurt Welzl 1984
- (Spain) David Fuster 2010–16
- (Spain) Dani García 2005–07
- (Spain) Raúl Bravo 2007–11
- (Spain) Matías Nahuel 2018–19
- (Spain) Vicente Iborra 2023–24
- (Spain) Joel Roca 2026–
- (Spain) Roberto Jiménez 2013–16
- (Spain) Alberto Botía 2014–18
- (Spain) Sergi Canós 2023
- (Spain) Miguel Torres 2013–14
- (Spain) Javito 2011–12
- (Spain) Albert Riera 2010–11
- (Spain) Fran Navarro 2024
- (Spain) Pipa 2022–23
- (Spain) Iván Marcano 2011–12, 2014
- (Spain) Francisco Yeste 2011–12
- (Spain) Pep Biel 2022–26
- (Spain) Moisés Hurtado 2010–11
- (Spain) Dani García 2024–26
- (Spain) Óscar 2008–10
- (Spain) Pablo Orbaiz 2011–12
- (Spain) Alberto de la Bella 2016–17
- (Spain) Quini 2023–24
- (Spain) Jefté Betancor 2025–26
- (Spain) Miguel Ángel Guerrero 2018–20
- (Portugal) Daniel Podence 2018–20, 2023–24, 2025–26
- (Portugal) Roderick Miranda 2018–19
- (Portugal) João Carvalho 2022–24
- (Portugal) Cafú 2020–21
- (Portugal) Chiquinho 2024–
- (Portugal) Gonçalo Paciência 2016
- (Portugal) Gustavo Sá 2026–
- (Portugal) André Martins 2016–18
- (Portugal) Costinha 2024–26
- (Portugal) Rúben Semedo 2019–22
- (Portugal) José Sá 2018–21
- (Portugal) Diogo Figueiras 2016–18
- (Portugal) Diogo Nascimento 2025–
- (Portugal) Sérgio Oliveira 2024–25
- (Portugal) Pêpê 2020–24
- (Portugal) Tiago Silva 2020–21
- (Portugal) Gelson Martins 2024–
- (Portugal) Bruma 2020–21
- (Portugal) Jota Silva 2026–
- (Portugal) Rúben Vinagre 2020
- (Portugal) Rúben Vezo 2024–26
- (Portugal) Paulo Machado 2012–14
- (Portugal) Gil Dias 2019
- (Portugal) Hernâni 2015–16
- (Portugal) Pelé 2014–15
- (Portugal) Rony Lopes 2021–22
- (Portugal) André Horta 2024, 2025
- (Netherlands) Ibrahim Afellay 2014–15
- (Netherlands) Boban Lazić 2014–15 (youth team)
- (Belgium) Erwin Lemmens 2005–06
- (Belgium) Kevin Mirallas 2010–12, 2018
- (Belgium) Silvio Proto 2017–18
- (Belgium) Guillaume Gillet 2017–18
- (Belgium) Vadis Odjidja-Ofoe 2017–18
- (Belgium) David Henen 2014–15 (all time on-loan)
- (Belgium) Bjorn Engels 2017–18
- (Belgium) Hugo Cuypers 2019–21
- (Italy) Enzo Maresca 2009–10
- (Italy) Leandro Greco 2012–13
- (Italy) Lorenzo Pirola 2024–
- (Italy) Nicola Leali 2016–17
- (Italy) (Greece) Luigi Cennamo 1998–99, 2000–01
- (Sweden) Olof Mellberg 2009–12
- (Sweden) Pär Zetterberg 2000–03
- (Sweden) Jimmy Durmaz 2014–16
- (Sweden) Thomas Ahlström 1979–82
- (Sweden) Håkan Sandberg 1987–88
- (Denmark) Philip Zinckernagel 2022–23
- (Denmark) Bent Christensen 1993–94
- (Denmark) Dennis Rommedahl 2010–11
- (Denmark) Niels Sørensen 1977–78
- (Norway) Roger Albertsen 1982–85
- (Norway) Omar Elabdellaoui 2014–20
- (Norway) Kristoffer Velde 2024–25
- (Norway) Tarik Elyounoussi 2016–18
- (Norway) Marcus Holmgren Pedersen 2026–
- (Norway) Abdisalam Ibrahim 2014
- (Norway) Ola Solbakken 2023–24
- (Iceland) Alfreð Finnbogason 2015
- (Iceland) Ögmundur Kristinsson 2020–23
- (Israel) Bibras Natcho 2018–19
- (Israel) Doron Leidner 2022–26
- (Russia) Yuri Savichev 1990–92
- (Russia) Yuri Lodygin 2019
- (Ukraine) Oleg Protasov 1990–94
- (Ukraine) Gennadiy Litovchenko 1990–93
- (Ukraine) Roman Yaremchuk 2024–
- (Armenia) Gevorg Ghazaryan 2014–15
- (Armenia) Nair Tiknizyan 2026–
- (Armenia) Zhora Hovhannisyan 2004–07 (all time on-loan)
- (Armenia) (Greece) Grigoris Aghanian 1964–71
- (Georgia (country)) Giorgi Popkhadze 2005–06 (youth team)
- (Georgia (country)) Giorgi Loria 2015
- (Moldova) Oleg Reabciuk 2021–23
- (Hungary) Lajos Détári 1988–90
- (Hungary) Balázs Megyeri 2011–15
- (Hungary) Krisztián Németh 2010–11
- (Hungary) Zsolt Laczkó 2007–08 (all time on-loan)
- (Czech Republic) Tomáš Vaclík 2021–23
- (Slovakia) Vladimir Weiss 2013–14
- (Slovakia) Pavel Kováč 2008–10
- (Slovakia) Juraj Buček 2003–05
- (Romania) (Greece) Christos Kaltsas 1978–81
- (Bulgaria) Emil Kremenliev 1996
- (Serbia) Miloš Šestić 1985–87
- (Serbia) Ilija Ivić 1994–99
- (Serbia) Darko Kovačević 2007–09
- (Serbia) (Greece) Predrag Đorđević 1996–09
- (Serbia) Luka Milivojević 2014–17
- (Serbia) Miloš Marić 2004–07
- (Serbia) Nikola Čumić 2020–22 (all time on-loan)
- (Serbia) Božidar Bandović 1997–98
- (Serbia) Svetozar Markovic 2019–22
- (Serbia) Marko Pantelić 2010–13
- (Serbia) Marko Šćepović 2013–14
- (Serbia) Lazar Ranđelović 2018–24
- (Serbia) Ljubomir Fejsa 2011–13
- (Serbia) Jagoš Vuković 2017–19
- (Serbia) Saša Zdjelar 2014–18
- (Serbia) Aleksandar Katai 2011–15 (all time on-loan)
- (Serbia) Kristijan Belić 2019–21 (youth team)
- (Montenegro) (Serbia) Uroš Đurđević 2017–18
- (Montenegro) Marko Janković 2014–17 (all time on-loan)
- (Montenegro) Petar Grbić 2011–14 (all time on-loan)
- (Montenegro) Stevan Jovetić 2023–24
- (Montenegro) Balša Popović 2026–
- (Bosnia and Herzegovina) Zinedin Smajlović 2026–
- (Bosnia and Herzegovina) Mirza Varešanović 1996–98
- (Bosnia and Herzegovina) Refik Šabanadžović 1996–98
- (Bosnia and Herzegovina) Nemanja Nikolić 2019–23 (youth team)
- (Croatia) Tomislav Butina 2006–08
- (Croatia) Hrvoje Milić 2017–18
- (Croatia) Martin Novoselac 1980–82
- (Croatia) Ivan Režić 2004–05
- (Croatia) Šime Vrsaljko 2022
- (Croatia) Ivica Ivušić 2018
- (Croatia) Ivan Brnić 2023–25
- (Slovenia) Zlatko Zahovič 1999-00
- (Slovenia) Mirnes Šišić 2008–09
- (Slovenia) Džoni Novak 2002–03
- (North Macedonia) Vanče Šikov 2007–08 (all time on-loan)
- (Poland) Michal Zewlakow 2006–10
- (Poland) Michał Karbownik 2021–22
- (Poland) Andrzej Juskowiak 1995–96
- (Poland) Marcin Kuzba 2003–04
- (Poland) Jacek Kazimierski 1987–88
- (Turkey) Yusuf Yazıcı 2024–
- (Turkey) Colin Kazim-Richards 2012
- (Turkey) Erol Bulut 2005–07
- (Turkey) Emre Mor 2020
- (Albania) (Greece) Foto Strakosha 1993–97
- (Albania) Jahmir Hyka 2007–08 (all time on-loan)
- (Albania) Klodian Gino 2014 (all time on-loan)
- (Albania) Qazim Laçi 2015–18
- (Kosovo) Zymer Bytyqi 2023

=== Africa ===
- (Cape Verde) Garry Rodrigues 2021–23
- (Cape Verde) Jovane Cabral 2024
- (Togo) Mathieu Dossevi 2014–16
- (Togo) Alaixys Romao 2016–18
- (Senegal) Pape Abou Cissé 2017–23
- (Senegal) Ousseynou Ba 2019–24
- (Cameroon) Gaëtan Bong 2013–15
- (Cameroon) Pierre Kunde 2021–24
- (Cameroon) Jean Makoun 2011–12
- (Cameroon) Banana Yaya 2018–20
- (Guinea) Aguibou Camara 2021–24
- (Guinea) Algassime Bah 2021–24
- (Guinea) Mady Camara 2018–24
- (Guinea) Fodé Camara 2019–21
- (Guinea) Mamadou Kané 2021–23
- (Republic of the Congo) Delvin N'Dinga 2013–15
- (Democratic Republic of the Congo) Cédric Bakambu 2022–23
- (Democratic Republic of the Congo) Arthur Masuaku 2014–16
- (Democratic Republic of the Congo) Lomana LuaLua 2007–08, 2009–10
- (Mali) Diadie Samassékou 2022–23
- (Mali) Sambou Yatabaré 2013–15
- (Mali) Abdoulaye Keita 2019–21
- (Mali) Drissa Diakite 2012–13
- (Chad) Marius Mouandilmadji 2026–
- (Ivory Coast) Yaya Touré 2005–06, 2018
- (Ivory Coast) Marco Né 2006–08
- (Nigeria) Rashidi Yekini 1994–95
- (Nigeria) Haruna Babangida 2005–07
- (Nigeria) Michael Olaitan 2013–16
- (Nigeria) Brown Ideye 2015–17
- (Nigeria) Emmanuel Emenike 2017–18
- (Nigeria) Henry Onyekuru 2021–23
- (Nigeria) Bruno Onyemaechi 2025–
- (Tunisia) Yassine Meriah 2018–21
- (Tunisia) Mohamed Dräger 2020–21
- (Morocco) Manuel da Costa 2015–17
- (Morocco) Abdeslam Ouaddou 2006
- (Morocco) Jaouad Zairi 2009–11
- (Morocco) Youssef El-Arabi 2019–24
- (Morocco) Mehdi Carcela 2017–18
- (Morocco) Ayoub El Kaabi 2023–
- (Egypt) Ahmed Hassan 2018–19, 2020–23
- (Algeria) Yassine Benzia 2019–20
- (Algeria) Carl Medjani 2013–14
- (Algeria) Rafik Djebbour 2011–13
- (Algeria) Djamel Abdoun 2011–13
- (Algeria) Hilal Soudani 2019–21
- (Mauritania) Aboubakar Kamara 2022–23
- (Liberia) Zizi Roberts 2001–02
- (Comoros) Ben Nabouhane 2015–18
- (Angola) Bruno Gaspar 2019–20
- (Angola) David Carmo 2024–25, 2026–
- (Ghana) Peter Ofori-Quaye 1997–03
- (Ghana) Kofi Amponsah 1998–00
- (Ghana) Mark Asigba 2014–17
- (Ghana) Felix Aboague 1998–99
- (South Africa) Thomas Hlongwane 1987–88
- (Zambia) Ashious Melu 1987–88

=== Asia ===
- (South Korea) Hwang In-beom 2022–23
- (South Korea) Hwang Ui-jo 2022–23
- (Iran) Mehdi Taremi 2025–26
- (Iran) Karim Ansarifard 2017–18
- (Iran) Ehsan Hajsafi 2018

=== Oceania ===
- (Australia) Chris Kalantzis 1992–97
- (Australia) Steve Refenes 1992–96
- (New Zealand) Marko Stamenić 2024–25

== Notable players ==
(Panhellenic Championship:period 1925–59)

- (Greece) Yiannis Andrianopoulos
- (Greece) Dinos Andrianopoulos
- (Greece) Georgios Andrianopoulos
- (Greece) Nikos Andrianopoulos
- (Greece) Vasilios Andrianopoulos
- (Greece) Ilias Rossidis
- (Greece) Savas Theodoridis
- (Greece) Kostas Karapatis
- (Greece) Stelios Kourkouklatos
- (Greece) Thanasis Bebis
- (Greece) Andreas Mouratis
- (Greece) Theologos Symeonidis
- (Greece) Dionisis Minardos
- (Greece) Filipos Kouradis
- (Greece) Themis Moustaklis
- (Greece) Achilleas Grammatikopoulos
- (Greece) Dimitris Kokkinakis
- (Greece) Babis Kotridis
- (Greece) Thanasis Kinley
- (Greece) Giannis Vazos
- (Greece) Lefteris Triantafyllou

(Alpha Ethniki:period 1959–79)

- (France) (Greece) Yves Triantafyllos
- (France) (Greece) Romain Argyroudis
- (Greece) (Germany) Maik Galakos
- (Greece) Nikos Gioutsos
- (Greece) Thanasis Angelis
- (Greece) Giorgos Sideris
- (Greece) Elias Yfantis
- (Greece) Pavlos Grigoriadis
- (Uruguay) Julio Losanta
- (Greece) Giorgos Gripeos
- (Greece) Vasilis Siokos
- (Greece) Kostas Davourlis
- (Greece) Petros Karavitis
- (Greece) Ioannis Kyrastas
- (France) Rolland Courbis
- (Argentina) Antonio Justo Alcibar
- (Argentina) Miguel Alberto Nicolau
- (Uruguay) Milton Viera
- (Greece) Tassos Pappas
- (Greece) Michalis Kritikopoulos
- (Greece) Babis Stavropoulos
- (Greece) Leyteris Poupakis
- (Greece) Christos Arvanitis
- (Greece) Apostolos Gletsos
- (Greece) Panagiotis Kelesidis
- (Greece) Dimitris Persidis
- (Greece) Kostas Lolios
- (Greece) Georgios Delikaris
- (Uruguay) Rafael Perone
- (Denmark) Niels Sørensen
- (Greece) Kostas Aidiniou
- (Greece) Stavros Papadopoulos
- (Greece) Kostas Saraliotis
- (Greece) Antonis Antoniadis
- (Greece) Giorgos Kokolakis
- (Greece) Dimitris Synetopoulos

(Professional Championship:period 1979–2006)

- (Cyprus) (Serbia) Siniša Gogić
- (Greece) Andreas Bonovas
- (Greece) George Kostikos
- (Greece) Vasilis Papachristou
- (Greece) Giorgos Semertzidis
- (Greece) Giorgios Vaitsis
- (Greece) Vangelis Kousoulakis
- (Greece) Giorgos Gavasiadis
- (Greece) Petros Karavitis
- (Greece) Thodoros Paxatouridis
- (Greece) Theo Pallas
- (Greece) Nikos Vamvakoulas
- (Greece) Petros Michos
- (Greece) Stavros Papapdopoulos
- (Greece) Kostas Orfanos
- (Greece) Ilias Talikriadis
- (Greece) Panagiotis Sofianopoulos
- (Greece) Petros Xanthopoulos
- (Greece) Theodoros Pachatouridis
- (Greece) Ilias Savidis
- (Greece) Giorgos Myrtsos
- (Greece) Alekos Rantos
- (Greece) Georgios Amanatidis
- (Greece) Yiannis Gounaris
- (Greece) Giorgos Mitsibonas
- (Greece) Takis Nikoloudis
- (Greece) Alexis Alexiou
- (Greece) Nikos Anastopoulos
- (Greece) Nikos Sarganis
- (Greece) Takis Lemonis
- (Greece) Tasos Mitropoulos
- (Greece) Stratos Apostolakis
- (Greece) Stelios Giannakopoulos
- (Greece) Vassilis Karapialis
- (Greece) Grigoris Georgatos
- (Greece) Kyriakos Karataidis
- (Greece) Dimitrios Eleftheropoulos
- (Greece) Nikos Dabizas
- (Greece) Lambros Choutos
- (Greece) Stylianos Venetidis
- (Greece) Paraskevas Antzas
- (Greece) Anastasios Pantos
- (Greece) Giotis Tsalouchidis
- (Greece) Nikos Tsiantakis
- (Greece) Georgios Skartados
- (Greece) Christos Patsatzoglou
- (Greece) Alekos Alexandris
- (Greece) Giannis Taralidis
- (Greece) Giorgos Anatolakis
- (Germany) Herbert Neumann
- (Germany) (Greece) Maik Galakos
- (Germany) (Greece) Minas Hantzidis
- (Greece) (Cape Verde) Daniel Batista
- (Greece) (Kazakhstan) Savvas Kofidis
- (Greece) (Uzbekistan) Dimitrios Mavrogenidis
- (Serbia) (Greece) Predrag Đorđević
- (Serbia) (Greece) Ilija Ivić
- (Serbia) Miloš Marić
- (Serbia) Miloš Šestić
- (Serbia) Darko Kovačević
- (Georgia (country)) (Greece) Andreas Niniadis
- (Cyprus) Michalis Konstantinou
- (Northern Ireland) Derek Spence
- (France) Christian Karembeu
- (Poland) Andrzej Juskowiak
- (Croatia) Martin Novoselac
- (Hungary) Lajos Détári
- (Nigeria) Rashidi Yekini
- (Norway) Roger Albertsen
- (Denmark) Bent Christensen
- (Sweden) Thomas Ahlström
- (Sweden) Pär Zetterberg
- (Russia) Yuri Savichev
- (Ukraine) Oleg Protasov
- (Ukraine) Gennadiy Litovchenko
- (Brazil) Rivaldo
- (Brazil) Giovanni
- (Brazil) Zé Elias
- (Brazil) Luciano de Souza
- (Brazil) Edu Dracena
- (Argentina) Juan Gilberto Funes
- (Argentina) Gabriel Schurrer
- (Uruguay) Vicente Estavillio
- (Uruguay) Jorge Walter Barrios
- (Mexico) Nery Castillo

== Club captains ==
Dates	Name	Seasons as captain
1959–1961	(Greece) Ilias Rosidis	2
1961–1968	(Greece) Kostas Polychroniou	7
1968–1969	(Greece) Giorgos Sideris	1
1969–1970	(Greece) Orestis Pavlidis	1
1970–1972	(Greece) Giannis Gaitatzis	2
1972–1978	(Greece) Vassilis Siokos	6
1978–1980	(Greece) Michalis Kritikopoulos	2
1980–1986	(Cyprus) Stavros Papadopoulos	6
1986–1988	(Greece) Petros Michos	2
1988–1991	(Greece) Tasos Mitropoulos	3
1991–1995	(Greece) Panagiotis Tsalouchidis	4
1995–1996	(Greece) Georgios Skartados	1
1996–2001	(Greece) Kyriakos Karataidis	5
2001–2003	(Greece) Alexis Alexandris	2
2003–2009	(Serbia) Predrag Đorđević	6
2009–2011	(Greece) Antonis Nikopolidis	2
2011–2013	(Greece) Vasilis Torosidis	2
2013–2014	(Greece) Avraam Papadopoulos	1
2014–2015	(Greece) Giannis Maniatis	1
2015–2016	(Spain) David Fuster	1
2016–2017	(Argentina) Alejandro Domínguez	1
2017–2018	(Spain) Alberto Botía	1
2018–2019	(Greece) Kostas Fortounis	1
2019–2020	(Norway) Omar Elabdellaoui	1
2020–2023	(Greece) Andreas Bouchalakis	3
2023	(Morocco) Youssef El-Arabi	1
2023–2024	(Greece) Kostas Fortounis	2
2024–2025	(Greece) Georgios Masouras	1
2025–	(Greece) Panagiotis Retsos	3

== Notes ==
Olympiacos FC Players

- (European Union) Foreign Players in Greece
