= 1976 Greek Football Cup final =

1976 Greek Cup final
- Event: 1975–76 Greek Football Cup
Iraklis	Olympiacos
4	4
- After extra time Iraklis won 6–5 on penalties
- Date: 9 June 1976
- Venue: AEK Stadium, Nea Filadelfia, Athens
- Referee: Leonidas Vamvakopoulos (Athens)
- Attendance: 24,871

The 1976 Greek Cup final was the 32nd final of the Greek Cup. The match took place on 9 June 1976 at Nikos Goumas Stadium. The contesting teams were Iraklis and Olympiacos. It was Iraklis' third Greek Cup final in their 68 years of existence and Olympiacos' twenty-first Greek Cup final and fourth consecutive in their 51-year history. The final has been characterized as one of the most thrilling in the history of the institution. Iraklis took the lead 2 times in regular time and Olympiacos equalized as many times. At the extra time, Iraklis made the 4–2, but again Olympiacos equalized in the last minutes, despite being down to 10 players. Eventually, in an equally dramatic penalty shoot-out, Iraklis won the first and only Cup in their history.

== Venue ==
This was the fourth Greek Cup final held at AEK Stadium, after the 1962, 1967 and 1974 finals.

AEK Stadium was built in 1930. The stadium is used as a venue for AEK Athens and was used for Greece on various occasions. Its current capacity is 32,000.

== Background ==
Iraklis had reached the Greek Cup final two times. The last time that they played in a final was in 1957, where they had lost to Olympiacos by 2–0.

Olympiacos had reached the Greek Cup final twenty times, winning sixteen of them. The last time that they played in a final was in 1975, where they had won against Panathinaikos by 1–0.

The two teams had met each other in a Cup final two times in the 1947 and 1957 finals.

== Route to the final ==
Iraklis		Round	Olympiacos	
Opponent	Result		Opponent	Result
Veria	2–2 (7–6 p) (A)	First round	Proodeftiki	3–0 (H)
Pierikos	1–0 (H)	Second round	Ethnikos Piraeus	1–0 (H)
Trikala	1–0 (A)	Round of 16	PAOK	1–1 (6–5 p) (H)
Panetolikos	7–1 (A)	Quarter-finals	Panionios	3–1 (H)
Panathinaikos	3–2 (H)	Semi-finals	AEK Athens	3–2 (A)

== Match ==
=== Details ===
9 June 1976
21:00 EEST

Iraklis	4–4 (a.e.t.)	Olympiacos
Hatzipanagis 25', 102'; Kousoulakis 72'; Gesios 111'	Report	Siokos 60'; Viera 81'; Karavitis 115'; Glezos 119'
Penalties
Sentelidis (penalty scored); Antonijević (penalty scored); Christoforidis (penalty scored); Pontikis (penalty scored); Hatzipanagis (penalty missed); Kousoulakis (penalty scored); Touboglou (penalty scored)	6–5	(penalty scored) Kyrastas; (penalty scored) Karavitis; (penalty scored) Stavropoulos; (penalty scored) Vasilopoulos; (penalty missed) Synetopoulos; (penalty scored) Glezos; (penalty missed) Siokos

AEK Stadium, Nea Filadelfia
Attendance: 24,871
Referee: Leonidas Vamvakopoulos (Athens)

GK	1	(Greece) Grigoris Fanaras (c)
DF	2	(Greece) Manolis Touboglou
DF	8	(Greece) Makis Sentelidis
DF	4	(Greece) Charalampos Xanthopoulos
DF	3	(Greece) Lazaros Kalaitzidis
MF	7	(Socialist Federal Republic of Yugoslavia) Zoran Antonijević
MF	6	(Greece) Vangelis Kousoulakis
MF	9	(Greece) Vasilis Hatzipanagis
FW	6	(Greece) Thanasis Christoforidis
FW	10	(Greece) Dimitrios Gesios	(substituted off) 113'
FW	11	(Greece) Nikos Pantazis	(substituted off) 80'
Substitutes:
MF		(Greece) Giorgos Matsoukatidis	(substituted on) 80'
FW		(Greece) Nikos Pontikis	(substituted on) 113'
Manager:
(England) Les Shannon

GK	1	(Greece) Panagiotis Kelesidis
DF	2	(Greece) Giannis Kyrastas
DF	3	(Greece) Thanasis Angelis
DF	4	(Greece) Vasilis Siokos (c)
DF	5	(Greece) Lakis Glezos
MF	6	(Greece) Petros Karavitis
MF	7	(Uruguay) Milton Viera		(substituted off) 91'
MF	8	(Greece) Kostas Davourlis	(red card) 112'
FW	9	(Greece) Michalis Kritikopoulos		(substituted off) 46'
FW	10	(Greece) Maik Galakos
FW	11	(Greece) Charalampos Stavropoulos
Substitutes:
DF		(Greece) Takis Synetopoulos		(substituted on) 46'
DF		(Greece) Giorgos Vasilopoulos		(substituted on) 91'
Manager:
(Greece) Georgios Darivas

Assistant referees:
Thomas Kaladamis (Athens)
Dimitris Protonotarios (Athens)

Match rules

- 90 minutes
- 30 minutes of extra time if necessary
- Penalty shootout if scores still level
- Five named substitutes
- Maximum of two substitutions

== See also ==
- 1975–76 Greek Football Cup
