= 1981 Greek Football Cup final =

1981 Greek Cup final
- Event: 1980–81 Greek Football Cup
Olympiacos	PAOK
3	1
- Date: 21 June 1981
- Venue: AEK Stadium, Nea Filadelfia, Athens
- Referee: Nikos Zlatanos (Thessaloniki)
- Attendance: 30,512

The 1981 Greek Cup final was the 37th final of the Greek Cup. The match took place on 21 June 1981 at Nikos Goumas Stadium. The contesting teams were Olympiacos and AEL. It was Olympiacos' twenty-second Greek Cup final in their 56 years of existence and PAOK's eleventh Greek Cup final in their 55-year history. The match was marked by riots between fans of both teams, one of the first expressions of hooliganism in Greece. The footballers of both teams were wearing black brassards, as the players of Olympiacos were mourning the victims of tragedy of gate 7 on 8 February 1981 and the players of PAOK in memory of their coach Gyula Lóránt, who had died at the bench on 31 May 1981.

== Venue ==
This was the sixth Greek Cup final held at AEK Stadium, after the 1962, 1967, 1974, 1976 and 1980 finals.

AEK Stadium was built in 1930 and it was renovated in 1979. The stadium is used as a venue for AEK Athens and was used for Greece on various occasions. Its current capacity is 35,000.

== Background ==
Olympiacos had reached the Greek Cup final twenty-one times, winning sixteen of them. The last time that they won the Cup was in 1975 (1–0 against Panathinaikos). The last time that they played in a final was in 1976, where they had lost to Iraklis by 6–5 on penalties, which came after a 4–4 draw at the end of the extra time.

PAOK had reached the Greek Cup final ten times, winning two of them. The last time they won the Cup was in 1974 (4–3 on penalties, which came after a 2–2 draw at the end of the extra time against Olympiacos). The last time they played in a final was in 1978, when they lost to AEK Athens by 2–0.

The two teams had met each other in a Cup final four times in 1951, 1971, 1973 and 1974 finals.

== Route to the final ==
Olympiacos				Round	PAOK			
Opponent	Agg.	1st leg	2nd leg		Opponent	Agg.	1st leg	2nd leg
Chalkida	3–1 (A)			First round	Niki Volos	1–1 (5–3 p) (A)		
Pierikos	5–0 (H)			Second round	Veria	2–0 (A)		
Panionios	2–0	0–0 (H)	3–0 (a.e.t.) (A)	Round of 16	Olympiacos Volos	4–2	2–1 (H)	2–1 (A)
Kavala	2–0	0–0 (A)	2–0 (H)	Quarter-finals	Ethnikos Asteras	8–2	5–0 (H)	3–2 (A)
Panegialios	6–1	3–0 (A)	3–1 (H)	Semi-finals	AEK Athens	3–0	1–0 (A)	2–0 (H)

== Match ==
=== Details ===
21 June 1981
21:30 EEST

Olympiacos	3–1	PAOK
Damanakis 18' (o.g.); Orfanos 61'; Kousoulakis 92'	Report	Damanakis 63'

AEK Stadium, Nea Filadelfia
Attendance: 30,512
Referee: Nikos Zlatanos (Thessaloniki)

Olympiacos	PAOK

GK	(Greece) Nikos Sarganis
DF	(Greece) Giannis Kyrastas
DF	(Greece) Nikos Vamvakoulas
DF	(Cyprus) Stavros Papadopoulos (c)
DF	(Socialist Federal Republic of Yugoslavia) Martin Novoselac
MF	(Greece) Vangelis Kousoulakis
MF	(Greece) Konstantinos Orfanos	(substituted off) 80'
MF	(Greece) Takis Nikoloudis	(substituted off) 69'
MF	(Greece) Takis Lemonis
FW	(Greece) Maik Galakos
FW	(Greece) Takis Persias
Substitutes:
DF	(Greece) Petros Michos	(substituted on) 69'
MF	(Sweden) Thomas Ahlström	(substituted on) 80'
Manager:
(Poland) Kazimierz Górski

GK	(Socialist Federal Republic of Yugoslavia) Mladen Furtula
DF	(Greece) Ioannis Gounaris
DF	(Greece) Konstantinos Iosifidis
DF	(Hungary) József Salamon
DF	(Greece) Thomas Singas
MF	(Greece) Ioannis Damanakis
MF	(Greece) Panagiotis Kermanidis	(substituted off) 68'
MF	(Greece) Vasilios Georgopoulos
MF	(Greece) Giorgos Koudas (c)	(substituted off) 75'
FW	(Brazil) Neto Guerino
FW	(Greece) Georgios Kostikos
Substitutes:
MF	(Greece) Vasilios Vasilakos	(substituted on) 75'
FW	(Greece) Stathis Triantafyllidis	(substituted on) 68'
Manager:
(Greece) Aristotelis Fountoukidis

Assistant referees:
Kostas Dedes (Messinia)
Antonis Vassaras (Thessaloniki)

Match rules

- 90 minutes
- 30 minutes of extra time if necessary
- Penalty shootout if scores still level
- Five named substitutes
- Maximum of two substitutions

== See also ==
- 1980–81 Greek Football Cup
