= 1975–76 Greek Football Cup =

1975–76 Greek Cup
Tournament details
- Country: Greece
- Teams: 56

Final positions
- Champions: Iraklis (1st title)
- Runners-up: Olympiacos

Tournament statistics
- Matches played: 54
- Goals scored: 169 (3.13 per match)
- Top goal scorer(s): Christos Ardizoglou; Dimitrios Gesios; Maik Galakos (5 goals each)

The 1975–76 Greek Football Cup was the 34th edition of the Greek Football Cup. The competition culminated with the Greek Cup Final, held at AEK Stadium, on 9 June 1976. The match was contested by Iraklis and Olympiacos, with Iraklis winning by 6–5 on penalty shoot-out, after a 4–4 draw at the end of the extra time.

== Calendar ==
Round	Date(s)	Fixtures	Clubs	New entries
First Round	2 November 1975	27	56 → 28	56
Second Round	8 February 1976	12	28 → 16	none
Round of 16	10 March 1976	8	16 → 8	none
Quarter-finals	21 April 1976	4	8 → 4	none
Semi-finals	12 May 1976	2	4 → 2	none
Final	9 June 1976	1	2 → 1	none

== Knockout phase ==
In the knockout phase, teams play against each other over a single match. If the match ends up as a draw, extra time will be played. If a winner doesn't occur after the extra time the winner emerges by penalty shoot-out.
The mechanism of the draws for each round is as follows:

- There are no seedings, and teams from the same group can be drawn against each other.

== First round ==
Team 1	Score	Team 2
Kastoria	0–3	Aris
Kavala	2–0 (w/o)	Panelefsiniakos
Panathinaikos	3–2	Almopos Aridea
AEL	2–1	Amfiali
Veria	2–2 (6–7 p)	Iraklis
Olympiacos Liosia	1–0	Panserraikos
Naoussa	2–1	Rodos
Xanthi	0–3	Doxa Drama
Chalkida	1–0	Korinthos
AEK Athens	7–0	PAO Agios Dimitrios
Panachaiki	3–1	Kalamata
Orfeas Egaleo	2–3 (a.e.t.)	Chania
Kozani	2–0	Egaleo
PAOK	4–0	Levadiakos
Anagennisi Karditsa	1–0	Atromitos Piraeus
Olympiacos Volos	4–0	Rigas Feraios
Fostiras	0–0 (6–5 p)	Apollon Athens
Trikala	3–1	Ethnikos Asteras
Ilisiakos	0–3	PAS Giannina
Atromitos	5–1	Panthrakikos
Olympiacos	3–0	Proodeftiki
Koropi	0–1	Panionios
Ionikos	3–2	Panarkadikos
Kampaniakos	0–0 (4–3 p)	Anagennisi Epanomi
Akrites Sykies	1–3	Ethnikos Piraeus
Panetolikos	2–1 (a.e.t.)	Pandramaikos
OFI	2–1	Lamia
A.F.C. Patra	0–1	Pierikos

== Bracket ==
Second round
Panetolikos (bye)
OFI	2
Atromitos	0
Trikala (bye)
Iraklis	1
Pierikos	0
Panathinaikos	2
Kavala	1
Chania (a.e.t.)	1
Kozani	0
Ionikos	0
Aris	2
Kampaniakos	1
AEL	4
Fostiras (bye)
Doxa Drama	2
Panachaiki	0
AEK Athens	2
Anagennisi Karditsa	1
Naoussa	0
Olympiacos Liosia	1
Olympiacos	1
Ethnikos Piraeus	0
PAOK	2
PAS Giannina	0
Chalkida (bye)
Panionios (a.e.t.)	4
Olympiacos Volos	1

Round of 16
Panetolikos (a.e.t.)	2
OFI	1
Trikala	0
Iraklis	1
Panathinaikos	1
Chania	0
Aris	3
AEL	1
Fostiras	2
Doxa Drama	1
AEK Athens	6
Olympiacos Liosia	0
Olympiacos (p)	1(6)
PAOK	1(5)
Chalkida	1
Panionios	2

Quarter-finals
Panetolikos	1
Iraklis	7
Panathinaikos	3
Aris	1
Fostiras	0
AEK Athens	1
Olympiacos	3
Panionios	1

Semi-finals
Iraklis	3
Panathinaikos	2
AEK Athens	2
Olympiacos	3

Final
Iraklis (p)	4(6)
Olympiacos	4(5)

== Second round ==
Team 1	Score	Team 2
PAOK	2–0	PAS Giannina
Ionikos	0–2	Aris
Kampaniakos	1–4	AEL
AEK Athens	2–1	Anagennisi Karditsa
Chania	1–0 (a.e.t.)	Kozani
Olympiacos	1–0	Ethnikos Piraeus
OFI	2–0	Atromitos
Doxa Drama	2–0	Panachaiki
Panionios	4–1 (a.e.t.)	Olympiacos Volos
Iraklis	1–0	Pierikos
Panathinaikos	2–1	Kavala
Naoussa	0–1	Olympiacos Liosia
Panetolikos	bye	
Fostiras	bye	
Trikala	bye	
Chalkida	bye	

== Round of 16 ==
Team 1	Score	Team 2
Trikala	0–1	Iraklis
Olympiacos	1–1 (6–5 p)	PAOK
Aris	3–1	AEL
Fostiras	2–1	Doxa Drama
Panetolikos	2–1 (a.e.t.)	OFI
Panathinaikos	1–0	Chania
AEK Athens	6–0	Olympiakos Neon Liosion
Chalkida	1–2	Panionios

== Quarter-finals ==
Team 1	Score	Team 2
Panathinaikos	3–1	Aris
Olympiacos	3–1	Panionios
Fostiras	0–1	AEK Athens
Panetolikos	1–7	Iraklis

== Semi-finals ==
Team 1	Score	Team 2
Iraklis	3–2	Panathinaikos
AEK Athens	2–3	Olympiacos

== Final ==
9 June 1976
21:00 EEST

Iraklis	4–4 (a.e.t.)	Olympiacos
Hatzipanagis 25', 102'; Kousoulakis 72'; Gesios 111'	Report	Siokos 60'; Viera 81'; Karavitis 115'; Glezos 119'
Penalties
Sentelidis (penalty scored); Antonijević (penalty scored); Christoforidis (penalty scored); Pontikis (penalty scored); Hatzipanagis (penalty missed); Kousoulakis (penalty scored); Touboglou (penalty scored)	6–5	(penalty scored) Kyrastas; (penalty scored) Karavitis; (penalty scored) Stavropoulos; (penalty scored) Vasilopoulos; (penalty missed) Synetopoulos; (penalty scored) Glezos; (penalty missed) Siokos

AEK Stadium, Nea Filadelfia
Attendance: 24,871
Referee: Leonidas Vamvakopoulos (Athens)
