= List of Olympiacos F.C. managers =

The following is a list of managers of Olympiacos and their major honours from the foundation of the club in 1925 to the present day. As of September 2026, Olympiacos have had 89 managers.

== Managers ==
- Only competitive matches are counted
- (n/a) = Information not available

Name	Nationality	From	To	Matches	Won	Drawn	Lost	Win% (Note: Win% is rounded to two decimal places)	Honours	Notes (Note: Time of service is measured in years and months, rounded down to the nearest month)
Giannis Andrianopoulos	(Greece)	1925	1927	(n/a)	(n/a)	(n/a)	(n/a)	(n/a)	-	2 years
Jan Kopřiva	(Czechoslovakia)	1927	1930	(n/a)	(n/a)	(n/a)	(n/a)	(n/a)	-	3 years
Josef Kovacs	(Hungary)	1930	1932	(n/a)	(n/a)	(n/a)	(n/a)	(n/a)	1 Panhellenic Championship	2 years
Tibor Esser	(Hungary)	1932	1933	(n/a)	(n/a)	(n/a)	(n/a)	(n/a)	1 Panhellenic Championship	1 year, 4 months
Jan Kopřiva	(Czechoslovakia)	1933	1934	(n/a)	(n/a)	(n/a)	(n/a)	(n/a)	1 Panhellenic Championship	8 months
Peter Pispaloou	(Germany)	1934	1935	(n/a)	(n/a)	(n/a)	(n/a)	(n/a)	-	1 year
Nikos Panopoulos	(Greece)	1935	1936	(n/a)	(n/a)	(n/a)	(n/a)	(n/a)	1 Panhellenic Championship	1 year
Jan Kopřiva	(Czechoslovakia)	1936	1937	(n/a)	(n/a)	(n/a)	(n/a)	(n/a)	1 Panhellenic Championship	1 year
Peter Lantz	(Austria)	1937	1938	(n/a)	(n/a)	(n/a)	(n/a)	(n/a)	1 Panhellenic Championship	1 year
Tibor Esser	(Hungary)	1938	1938	(n/a)	(n/a)	(n/a)	(n/a)	(n/a)	-	8 months
Themos Asderis	(Greece)	1945	1947	(n/a)	(n/a)	(n/a)	(n/a)	(n/a)	1 Panhellenic Championship; 1 Greek Football Cup	2 years
Theologos Symeonidis	(Greece)	1948	1950	(n/a)	(n/a)	(n/a)	(n/a)	(n/a)	1 Panhellenic Championship	2 years
Vangelis Chelmis; Giannis Chelmis	(Greece) (Greece)	1950	1954	(n/a)	(n/a)	(n/a)	(n/a)	(n/a)	2 Panhellenic Championship; 4 Greek Football Cup	4 years
Theologos Symeonidis	(Greece)	1954	1955	(n/a)	(n/a)	(n/a)	(n/a)	(n/a)	1 Panhellenic Championship	8 months
Kostas Negrepontis	(Greece)	1955	1955	(n/a)	(n/a)	(n/a)	(n/a)	(n/a)	-	8 months
Vangelis Chelmis; Giannis Chelmis	(Greece) (Greece)	1956	1956	(n/a)	(n/a)	(n/a)	(n/a)	(n/a)	1 Panhellenic Championship	1 year
Prvoslav Dragićević	(Socialist Federal Republic of Yugoslavia)	1956	1957	(n/a)	(n/a)	(n/a)	(n/a)	(n/a)	1 Panhellenic Championship; 1 Greek Football Cup	1 year
Tibor Kemény	(Hungary)	1957	1958	(n/a)	(n/a)	(n/a)	(n/a)	(n/a)	1 Panhellenic Championship; 1 Greek Football Cup	1 year
Bruno Vale	(Italy)	1958	1960	(n/a)	(n/a)	(n/a)	(n/a)	(n/a)	1 Panhellenic Championship; 1 Greek Football Cup	1 year, 6 months
Kiril Simonovski	(Socialist Federal Republic of Yugoslavia)	1960	1962	(n/a)	(n/a)	(n/a)	(n/a)	(n/a)	2 Greek Football Cup	1 year, 6 months
Alekos Chatzistavridis	(Greece)	1962	1962	(n/a)	(n/a)	(n/a)	(n/a)	(n/a)	-	6 months
Giannis Chelmis	(Greece)	1962	1963	(n/a)	(n/a)	(n/a)	(n/a)	(n/a)	1 Greek Football Cup	1 year
András Dolgos	(Hungary)	1963	1964	(n/a)	(n/a)	(n/a)	(n/a)	(n/a)	-	1 year
Nándor Cserna	(Hungary)	1964	1965	(n/a)	(n/a)	(n/a)	(n/a)	(n/a)	-	1 year
Márton Bukovi	(Hungary)	June 1965	1967	(n/a)	(n/a)	(n/a)	(n/a)	(n/a)	2 Alpha Ethniki; 1 Greek Football Cup	2 years, 6 months
Soulis Kinley	(Greece)	1967	1968	(n/a)	(n/a)	(n/a)	(n/a)	(n/a)	1 Greek Football Cup	8 months
Ljubiša Spajić	(Socialist Federal Republic of Yugoslavia)	1968	1969	(n/a)	(n/a)	(n/a)	(n/a)	(n/a)	-	10 months
Thanasis Bebis	(Greece)	1969	1969	(n/a)	(n/a)	(n/a)	(n/a)	(n/a)	-	3 months
Stjepan Bobek	(Socialist Federal Republic of Yugoslavia)	1969	1970	(n/a)	(n/a)	(n/a)	(n/a)	(n/a)	-	10 months
Elias Yfantis	(Greece)	1970	1970	(n/a)	(n/a)	(n/a)	(n/a)	(n/a)	-	2 months
Dan Georgiadis	(Greece)	1970	1971	(n/a)	(n/a)	(n/a)	(n/a)	(n/a)	-	6 months
Georgios Darivas	(Greece)	1971	1971	(n/a)	(n/a)	(n/a)	(n/a)	(n/a)	1 Greek Football Cup	3 months
Lakis Petropoulos	(Greece)	1971	1971	(n/a)	(n/a)	(n/a)	(n/a)	(n/a)	-	2 months
Alan Ashman	(England)	20 July 1971	25 June 1972	(n/a)	(n/a)	(n/a)	(n/a)	(n/a)	-	11 months
Lakis Petropoulos	(Greece)	1 July 1972	6 April 1975	(n/a)	(n/a)	(n/a)	(n/a)	(n/a)	2 Alpha Ethniki; 1 Greek Football Cup	2 years, 9 months
Georgios Darivas	(Greece)	6 April 1975	30 June 1975	(n/a)	(n/a)	(n/a)	(n/a)	(n/a)	1 Alpha Ethniki	3 months
Vic Buckingham	(England)	1 July 1975	6 January 1976	(n/a)	(n/a)	(n/a)	(n/a)	(n/a)	-	6 months
Georgios Darivas	(Greece)	6 January 1976	23 May 1976	(n/a)	(n/a)	(n/a)	(n/a)	(n/a)	1 Greek Football Cup	4 months
Les Shannon	(England)	1 June 1976	31 May 1977	(n/a)	(n/a)	(n/a)	(n/a)	(n/a)	-	1 year
Todor Veselinović	(Socialist Federal Republic of Yugoslavia)	1 July 1977	6 February 1980	108	65	18	25	60.19	-	2 years, 7 months
Kazimierz Górski	(Poland)	8 February 1980	15 June 1981	61	36	17	8	59.02	2 Alpha Ethniki; 1 Greek Football Cup	1 year, 4 months
Helmut Senekowitsch	(Austria)	1 July 1981	16 December 1981	13	4	7	2	30.77	-	5 months
Alketas Panagoulias	(Greece)	16 December 1981	6 February 1983	49	29	13	7	59.18	2 Alpha Ethniki	1 year, 1 month
Kazimierz Górski	(Poland)	7 February 1983	30 June 1983	20	12	4	4	60.00	1 Alpha Ethniki	4 months
Heinz Höher	(West Germany)	1 July 1983	25 November 1983	15	8	3	4	53.33	-	4 months
Thanasis Bebis (caretaker)	(Greece)	26 November 1983	30 November 1983	1	1	0	0	100.00	-	0 months
Nikos Alefantos	(Greece)	1 December 1983	12 March 1984	14	9	2	3	64.29	-	3 months
Thanasis Bebis (caretaker)	(Greece)	13 March 1984	7 May 1984	8	5	3	0	62.50	-	1 month
Georg Keßler	(West Germany)	1 June 1984	29 April 1985	35	18	8	9	51.43	-	10 months
Thanasis Bebis (caretaker)	(Greece)	30 April 1985	16 June 1985	5	3	2	0	60.00	-	1 month
Antonis Georgiadis	(Greece)	20 June 1985	11 October 1986	48	25	10	14	52.08	-	1 year, 3 months
Alketas Panagoulias	(Greece)	12 October 1986	19 November 1987	44	26	8	10	59.09	1 Alpha Ethniki; 1 Greek Super Cup	1 year, 1 month
Pavlos Grigoriadis	(Greece)	20 November 1987	6 December 1987	2	0	1	1	0.00	-	0 months
Thijs Libregts	(Netherlands)	7 December 1987	8 February 1988	11	5	4	2	45.46	-	2 months
Pavlos Grigoriadis	(Greece)	9 February 1988	15 May 1988	19	9	7	3	47.37	-	3 months
Jacek Gmoch	(Poland)	1 June 1988	8 March 1989	26	14	6	6	53.85	-	9 months
Giorgos Papamalis (caretaker)	(Greece)	9 March 1989	11 March 1989	0	0	0	0	(n/a)	-	0 months
Giannis Gounaris	(Greece)	12 March 1989	21 May 1989	8	3	4	1	37.50	-	2 months
Miltos Papapostolou	(Greece)	1 June 1989	25 September 1989	7	4	2	1	57.14	-	3 months
Imre Komora	(Hungary)	26 September 1989	27 May 1990	49	24	16	9	48.98	1 Greek Football Cup	8 months
Oleg Blokhin	(Ukraine)	1 June 1990	24 January 1993	126	77	34	15	61.11	1 Greek Football Cup; 1 Greek Super Cup	2 years, 7 months
Antonis Georgiadis (caretaker)	(Greece)	25 January 1993	29 January 1993	1	1	0	0	100.00	-	0 months
Apostolos Filis (caretaker)	(Greece)	30 January 1993	31 January 1993	1	1	0	0	100.00	-	0 months
Ljupko Petrović	(Serbia and Montenegro)	1 February 1993	5 November 1993	39	21	10	8	53.85	-	9 months
Kostas Polychroniou	(Greece)	6 November 1993	26 January 1994	17	7	9	1	41.18	-	2 months
Nikos Alefantos	(Greece)	27 January 1994	16 September 1994	19	11	5	3	57.90	-	7 months
Nikos Gioutsos (caretaker)	(Greece)	17 September 1994	20 October 1994	5	2	1	2	40.00	-	1 month
Thijs Libregts	(Netherlands)	21 October 1994	8 July 1995	35	19	7	9	54.29	-	8 months
Stavros Diamantopoulos	(Greece)	9 July 1995	11 January 1996	29	21	5	3	72.41	-	5 months
Takis Persias (caretaker)	(Greece)	12 January 1996	25 June 1996	18	8	4	6	44.44	-	5 months
Dušan Bajević	(Bosnia and Herzegovina)	26 June 1996	10 November 1999	157	113	22	22	71.98	3 Alpha Ethniki; 1 Greek Football Cup	3 years, 4 months
Alberto Bigon	(Italy)	11 November 1999	10 April 2000	26	19	3	4	73.08	-	5 months
Giannis Matzourakis	(Greece) (Romania)	10 April 2000	25 November 2000	30	24	3	3	80.00	1 Alpha Ethniki	7 months
Takis Lemonis	(Greece)	25 November 2000	9 October 2002	89	63	13	13	70.79	2 Alpha Ethniki	1 year, 10 months
Giannis Kollias (caretaker)	(Greece)	10 October 2002	30 October 2002	5	0	2	3	0.00	-	0 months
Srečko Katanec	(Slovenia)	7 November 2002	7 February 2003	14	8	5	1	57.14	-	3 months
Oleh Protasov	(Ukraine)	9 February 2003	17 March 2004	52	37	5	10	71.15	1 Alpha Ethniki	1 year, 1 month
Siniša Gogić (caretaker)	(Cyprus) (Serbia)	17 March 2004	19 March 2004	0	0	0	0	(n/a)	-	0 months
Nikos Alefantos (caretaker)	(Greece)	19 March 2004	31 May 2004	10	7	2	1	70.00	-	2 months
Dušan Bajević	(Bosnia and Herzegovina)	1 June 2004	1 June 2005	51	31	10	10	60.78	1 Alpha Ethniki; 1 Greek Football Cup	1 year
Trond Sollied	(Norway)	5 July 2005	28 December 2006	66	45	6	15	68.18	1 Alpha Ethniki; 1 Greek Football Cup	1 year, 5 months
Takis Lemonis	(Greece)	29 December 2006	11 March 2008	53	33	15	5	62.26	1 Super League; 1 Greek Super Cup	1 year, 2 months
José Segura (caretaker)	(Spain)	11 March 2008	28 May 2008	10	8	1	1	80.00	1 Super League; 1 Greek Football Cup	2 months
Ernesto Valverde	(Spain)	11 June 2008	14 May 2009	47	31	7	9	65.96	1 Super League; 1 Greek Football Cup	11 months
Temur Ketsbaia	(Georgia (country))	25 May 2009	15 September 2009	6	5	1	0	83.33	-	3 months
Božidar Bandović (caretaker)	(Montenegro)	15 September 2009	22 September 2009	2	2	0	0	100.00	-	0 months
Zico	(Brazil)	23 September 2009	19 January 2010	20	12	3	5	60.00	-	4 months
Božidar Bandović (caretaker)	(Montenegro)	19 January 2010	14 June 2010	20	8	4	8	40.00	-	4 months
Ewald Lienen	(Germany)	21 June 2010	6 August 2010	4	3	0	1	75.00	-	1 month
Ernesto Valverde	(Spain)	10 August 2010	30 June 2012	80	61	6	13	76.25	2 Super League; 1 Greek Football Cup	1 year, 10 months
Leonardo Jardim	(Portugal)	1 July 2012	19 January 2013	25	19	3	3	76.00	-	6 months
Antonis Nikopolidis (caretaker)	(Greece)	19 January 2013	4 February 2013	4	3	1	0	75.00	-	0 months
Míchel	(Spain)	4 February 2013	6 January 2015	91	65	11	15	71.43	2 Super League; 1 Greek Football Cup	1 year, 11 months
Antonis Nikopolidis (caretaker)	(Greece)	6 January 2015	8 January 2015	1	1	0	0	100.00	-	0 months
Vítor Pereira	(Portugal)	7 January 2015	11 June 2015	27	18	6	3	66.67	1 Super League; 1 Greek Football Cup	5 months
Marco Silva	(Portugal)	7 July 2015	23 June 2016	48	38	3	7	79.17	1 Super League	11 months
Víctor Sánchez	(Spain)	24 June 2016	9 August 2016	2	0	1	1	0.00	-	1 month
Paulo Bento	(Portugal)	11 August 2016	6 March 2017	40	26	8	6	65.00	-	6 months
Vasilis Vouzas (caretaker)	(Greece)	6 March 2017	22 March 2017	4	1	1	2	25.00	-	0 months
Takis Lemonis (caretaker)	(Greece)	23 March 2017	31 May 2017	5	5	0	0	100.00	1 Super League	2 months
Besnik Hasi	(Kosovo) (Albania)	8 June 2017	25 September 2017	11	6	3	2	54.55	-	3 months
Takis Lemonis	(Greece)	25 September 2017	4 January 2018	18	10	2	6	55.56	-	3 months
Christos Kontis (caretaker)	(Greece)	4 January 2018	8 January 2018	1	1	0	0	100.00	-	0 months
Óscar García	(Spain)	8 January 2018	3 April 2018	12	5	5	2	41.67	-	2 months
Christos Kontis (caretaker)	(Greece)	3 April 2018	30 June 2018	4	2	0	2	60.00	-	2 months
Pedro Martins	(Portugal)	1 July 2018	1 August 2022	221	143	41	37	64.71	3 Super League; 1 Greek Football Cup	4 years, 1 month
Carlos Corberán	(Spain)	1 August 2022	18 September 2022	11	2	6	3	18.18	-	2 months
Míchel	(Spain)	21 September 2022	3 April 2023	32	18	10	4	56.25	-	6 months
José Anigo (caretaker)	(France)	4 April 2023	20 June 2023	9	5	1	3	55.55	-	3 months
Diego Martínez	(Spain)	20 June 2023	5 December 2023	21	13	4	4	61.90	-	5 months
Carlos Carvalhal	(Portugal)	5 December 2023	8 February 2024	11	5	3	3	45.45	-	2 months
Sotiris Sylaidopoulos (caretaker)	(Greece)	8 February 2024	11 February 2024	1	1	0	0	100.00	-	0 months
José Luis Mendilibar	(Spain)	12 February 2024	9 September 2026	127	79	27	21	62.20	1 UEFA Europa Conference League; 1 Super League; 1 Greek Cup; 1 Greek Super Cup	2 years, 7 months
Imanol Alguacil	(Spain)	10 September 2026		13	10	2	1	76.92	-	

As of 22 November 2026

== List of Olympiacos managers with most games in total ==
- Only managers with known stats are included

#	Name	Nationality	Years	P	W	D	L	Win%	Honours
1	Pedro Martins	(Portugal)	2018-2022	221	143	41	37	64.71	3 Super League, 1 Greek Football Cup
2	Dušan Bajević	(Bosnia and Herzegovina)	1996-1999, 2004-2005	208	144	32	32	69.23	4 Alpha Ethniki, 2 Greek Football Cup
3	Takis Lemonis	(Greece)	2000-2002, 2006-2008, 2017, 2017-2018	165	111	30	24	67.27	4 Super League, 1 Greek Football Cup
4	Lakis Petropoulos	(Greece)	1971, 1972-1975	132	91	28	13	68.94	2 Alpha Ethniki, 1 Greek Football Cup
5	Ernesto Valverde	(Spain)	2008-2009, 2010-2012	127	92	13	22	72.44	3 Super League, 2 Greek Football Cup
6	José Luis Mendilibar	(Spain)	2024-2026	127	79	27	21	62.20	1 UEFA Europa Conference League, 1 Super League Greece, 1 Greek Football Cup, 1 Greek Super Cup
7	Oleg Blokhin	(Ukraine)	1990-1993	126	77	34	15	61.11	1 Greek Football Cup, 1 Greek Super Cup
8	Míchel	(Spain)	2013-2015, 2022-2023	123	83	21	19	67.47	2 Super League, 1 Greek Football Cup
9	Todor Veselinović	(Socialist Federal Republic of Yugoslavia)	1977-1980	105	67	16	22	63.81	
10	Alketas Panagoulias	(Greece)	1981-1983, 1986-1987	93	55	21	17	59.14	3 Alpha Ethniki, 1 Greek Football Cup

As of 9 September 2026
