= Estavillo (surname) =

Estavillo is a surname. Notable people with the surname include:

- María Elena Estavillo Flores, Mexican economist
- Jason Wallace Estavillo, CEO and Founder of Estavillo Law Group
- Nicholas Estavillo (born 1945), Puerto Rican United States Marine and police officer
- Vicente Estavillo (born 1955), Uruguayan footballer
