= Andrianopoulos =

- Language: Greek

Origin
- Region of origin: Greece

Andrianopoulos is a Greek surname. It may refer to:

- Alex Andrianopoulos (born 1955), Australian politician
- Leonidas Andrianopoulos (1911–2011), Greek footballer, brother of Vassilis and Yiannis
- Vassilis Andrianopoulos (1908–1989), Greek footballer, brother of Leonidas and Yiannis
- Yiannis Andrianopoulos (1900–1952), Greek footballer, brother of Leonidas and Vassilis
