= Glezos =

Glezos (Greek: Γλέζος or Γκλέζος) is a Greek surname. Notable people with this surname include:

- Lakis Glezos (1947–2007), Greece national team footballer
- Manolis Glezos (1922–2020), Greek politician and member of the Greek Resistance
- Nikos Glezos (1925–1944) Greek resistance member and brother of Manolis
