= Julio Losada =

Uruguayan footballer (born 1950)

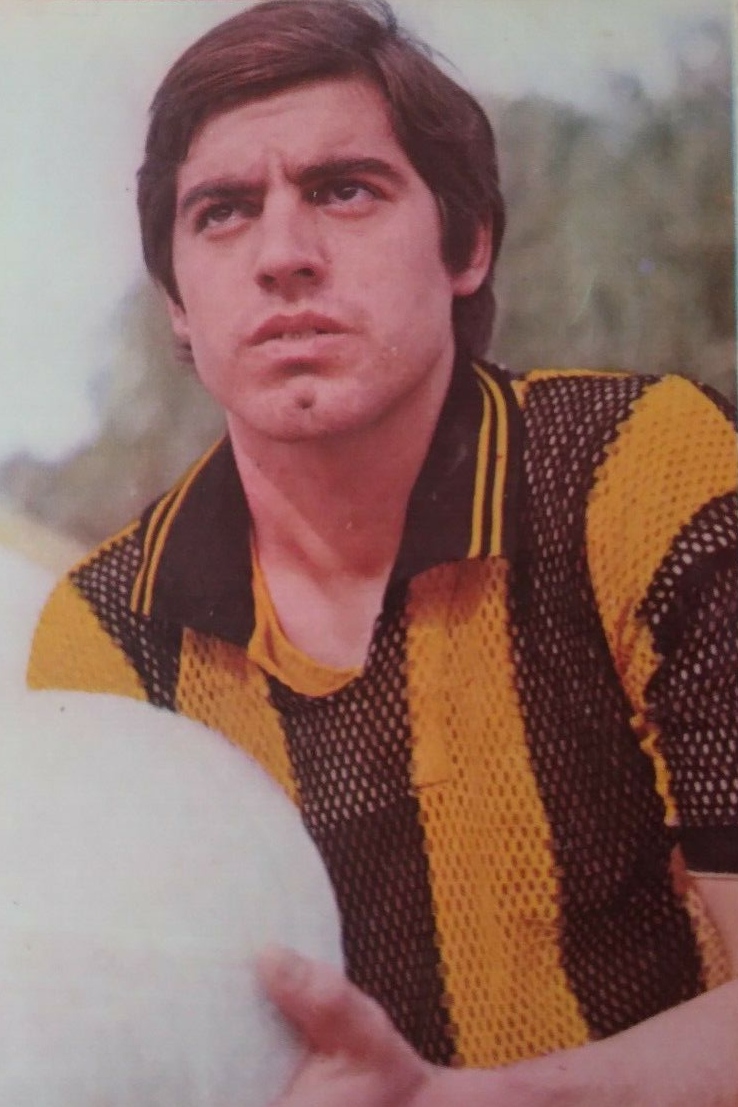
- Losada playing for Peñarol

Personal information
- Full name: Julio Daniel Losada
- Date of birth: 16 June 1950 (age 76)
- Place of birth: Uruguay
- Position: Striker

Senior career*
| Years | Team | Apps | (Gls) |
| 1969–1972 | Peñarol | | |
| 1972–1982 | Olympiacos | 151 | (30) |

International career
| 1970 | Uruguay | 5 | (0) |
- * Club domestic league appearances and goals

Julio Daniel Losada (born 16 June 1950) is a Uruguayan former professional footballer who played as a striker for Greek club Olympiacos and for Peñarol.

== Career ==
Losada was born in Uruguay. At the age of 22, he made the trip to Piraeus and joined Olympiacos as yet another naturalised superstar of the Goulandris era. President of the club at the time, Goulandris was noted for signing star players; Losada being one of the largest. Together with teammate and French International striker Yves Triantafillos, Losada created one of the greatest attacking lines in Olympiacos history.

Small in height, Losada was fierce from the right wing and quickly became a legend to the Olympiacos fans, who he played in front of for eight seasons. Finishing his time with the Greek club in 1980, Losada played with the red and white shirt during 146 games, scoring 30 goals in the Greek First Division. He is second in the club's all time appearances for a foreign player behind Predrag Đorđević.

Julio Losada was capped by the Uruguay national team twice during the 1970 FIFA World Cup against Israel and Sweden. Losada made five appearances in total for Uruguay.

== Honours ==
Olympiacos

- Greek First Division Championship: 1972–73, 1973–74, 1974–75, 1979–80
- Greek Cup: 1972–73, 1974–75
