= Takis Persias =

Greek footballer

Personal information
- Full name: Meletis Persias
- Date of birth: 9 December 1957 (age 68)
- Place of birth: Piraeus, Greece
- Position: Midfielder

Youth career
- 1972–1976: Olympiacos

Senior career*
Years	Team	Apps	(Gls)
1976–1985	Olympiacos	168	(15)
1979–1980	→ Ethnikos Piraeus (loan)	20	(3)
1985–1988	OFI	62	(4)
1988–1989	Levadiakos	3	(0)

International career
1981–1982	Greece	2	(0)

Managerial career
- 1995–1996: Olympiacos (assistant coach)
- 1996: Olympiacos
- 1996–1999: Olympiacos (assistant coach)
- 2000–2002: PAOK (assistant coach)
- 2002–2004: AEK Athens (assistant coach)
- 2004–2005: Olympiacos (assistant coach)
- * Club domestic league appearances and goals

Meletis "Takis" Persias (Greek: Μελέτης "Τάκης" Περσίας) is a retired Greek football player who was active during the 1970s and 1980s.

== Career ==
Persias was born on 9 December 1957 in Piraeus, Greece. He played for Olympiacos in the period 1976–1985. In 1985 he signed with OFI. Persias played for the Cretans between 1985 and 1988. He ended his career at Levadiakos in 1989.

== Honours ==
OFI

- Greek Cup: 1986–87

Olympiacos

- Alpha Ethniki: 1980–81, 1981–82, 1982–83
- Greek Cup: 1980–81
