= Martin Novoselac =

Croatian footballer

Personal information
- Full name: Martin Novoselac
- Date of birth: 10 November 1950 (age 75)
- Place of birth: Vinkovci, FPR Yugoslavia
- Position: Defender

Youth career
- 1968–1969: Dinamo Vinkovci

Senior career*
Years	Team	Apps	(Gls)
1969–1972	Dinamo Vinkovci		
1972–1977	Vojvodina	146	(6)
1977–1980	Dinamo Zagreb	31	(0)
1980–1982	Olympiacos	67	(1)
1982–1984	Dinamo Vinkovci	61	(0)

International career
1975–1976	Yugoslavia	4	(0)

Managerial career
- 1987–1988: Dinamo Vinkovci
- 1992–1996: Croatia U21
- 1996: Croatia U23
- 2000–2004: Croatia U21
- 2004: Croatia (assistant)
- * Club domestic league appearances and goals

Martin Novoselac (born 10 November 1950) is a Croatian former footballer who played as a defender.

== Playing career ==
=== Club ===
Novoselac began his career at Second League club Dinamo Vinkovci, but in 1972 he moved Yugoslav First League club Vojvodina Novi Sad where he impressed so quickly, he earned a spot on the SFR Yugoslavia National Team. Larger clubs soon came calling, as Croatian giants Dinamo Zagreb acquired the defender for 3 seasons before he caught the eye of Olympiacos. With the Piraeus club, Novoselac won two Greek Championships and got to showcase his skills in the European Club Championship. In 1982, he returned to his boyhood club Dinamo Vinkovci and retired from professional football two years later.

=== International ===
He made his debut for Yugoslavia in a May 1975 friendly match against the Netherlands, coming on as a 86th-minute substitute for Josip Katalinski, and earned a total of 4 caps, scoring no goals. His final international was an April 1976 friendly against Hungary.

== Post-playing career ==
After retiring from playing the game, Novoselac established a notable career coaching and developing youth football in Croatia. For a long while, Novoselac coached the Croatia national under-21 football team, guiding them to such tournaments as the 1999 FIFA World Youth Championship and the 2004 UEFA European Under-21 Championship. Achieving significant success, Novoselac was even considered for the Croatia National Team job in 2004. Currently, he is the head of the Croatian Football Federation's youth development program.

== Honours ==
Vojvodina

- Mitropa Cup: 1976–77
- UEFA Intertoto Cup: 1976

Dinamo Zagreb

- Yugoslav Cup: 1979–80

Olympiacos

- Super League Greece: 1980–81, 1981–82
- Greek Cup: 1980–81
