= Aristotelis Fountoukidis =

Greek footballer (1942–2007)

Aristos Fountoukidis
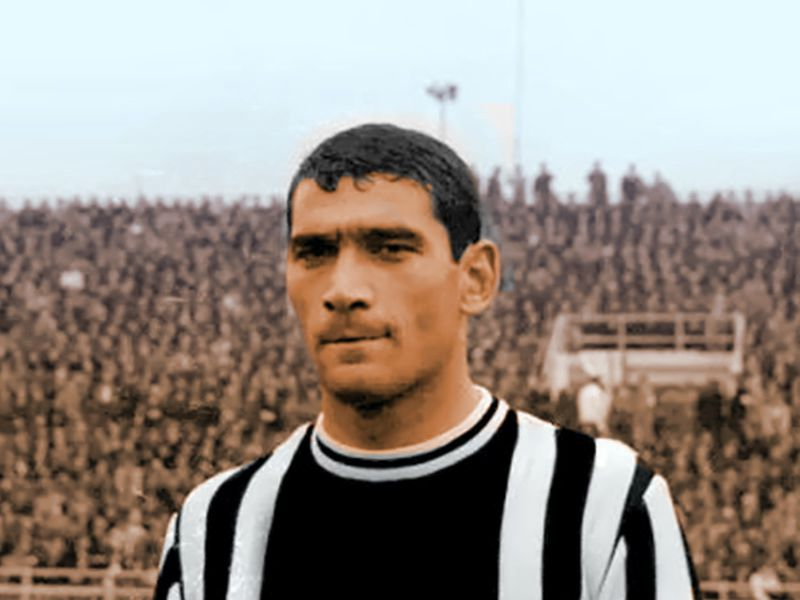
- Fountoukidis during the 1966–67 season

Personal information
- Full name: Aristotelis Fountoukidis
- Date of birth: 13 February 1942
- Place of birth: Panteleimon, Kilkis, Greece
- Date of death: 7 July 2007 (aged 65)
- Place of death: Nea Kallikrateia, Chalkidiki, Greece
- Position: Centre back

Youth career
- 1956–1960: Aris Panteleimon

Senior career*
| Years | Team | Apps | (Gls) |
| 1960–1963 | Apollon Kalamarias | 14 | (2) |
| 1963–1966 | MENT | 81 | (0) |
| 1966–1978 | PAOK | 336 | (18) |
| Total | | 430 | (20) |

Managerial career
- 1981: PAOK (caretaker)
- * Club domestic league appearances and goals

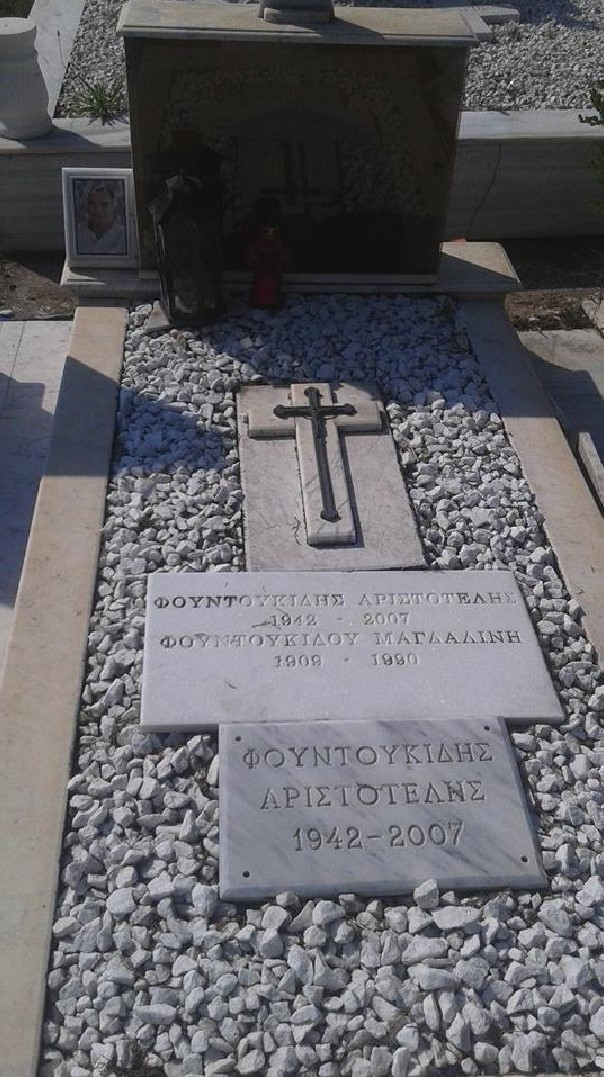
Fountoukidis' gravesite

Aristotelis Fountoukidis (Greek: Αριστοτέλης Φουντουκίδης; 13 February 1942 – 7 July 2007), known mistakenly for many years as Aristarchos Fountoukidis (Greek: Αρίσταρχος Φουντουκίδης), was a Greek footballer who played as a central defender.

== Career ==
Fountoukidis was born in 1942 in Panteleimon, Kilkis. He started playing football at his hometown club Aris Panteleimon and in 1960 he moved to Apollon Kalamaria. In 1963, he was transferred to MENT and from there he was acquired by PAOK in the summer of 1966, a move that was made possible thanks to the collaboration of PAOK administrative leader Giorgos Pantelakis with the team's coach Nikos Pangalos. Although he started his career as a center forward, at PAOK he established himself as a central defender and quickly became irreplaceable. Fountoukidis worked in construction when he was young and thanks to his impressive physical qualities, he was nicknamed "The Wall" (Greek: "Ο Τοίχος"). He is PAOK 5th all-time appearance maker with 395 games in total (336 in the league) and won with the White-blacks of the North the 1972 and 1974 editions of the Cup and the 1976 league title.

Fountoukidis was assistant of Gyula Lóránt when the Hungarian manager returned to PAOK for a second spell in 1980 and took over as caretaker coach after Lóránt's passing. Aristos coached PAOK in the 1981 Greek Cup final against Olympiacos.

== Death ==
On 7 July 2007, he suffered a heart attack and died at the age of 65. PAOK FC issued the following statement:

«PAOK FC expresses its deepest condolences to the family of the deceased, who was a leader and soul of the club. His name and his contribution will remain indelibly written in the golden pages of PAOK's history. PAOK FC Board of Directors decided to ask the higher authorities to observe a minute of silence in memory of Aristotelis Fountoukidis in the first official game of the new season. Club's representatives will lay wreaths at his funeral, which will take place at 17:00 at the Church of the Transfiguration of the Savior in Kalamaria.»

== Honours ==
PAOK

- Alpha Ethniki: 1975–76
- Greek Cup: 1971–72, 1973–74

== Bibliography ==
- Bliatkas, Kostas (2005). Γιώργος Κούδας, της ζωής μου το παιχνίδι [Giorgos Koudas, the game of my life] (in Greek). Greece: Ianos Publications. ISBN 978-960-7827-35-7.
- Pappous, Michalis (2019). Ο ΠΑΟΚ του '70 [The PAOK of the '70s] (in Greek). Greece: University Studio Press. ISBN 978-960-12-2421-3.
