= Charalampos Xanthopoulos =

Greek footballer

Babis Xanthopoulos
Personal information
- Full name: Charalampos Xanthopoulos
- Date of birth: 29 August 1956 (age 70)
- Place of birth: Thessaloniki, Greece
- Position: Midfielder

Senior career*
Years	Team	Apps	(Gls)
1974–1987	Iraklis	283	(14)
1987–1988	Pierikos	52	(7)
Total		335	(21)

International career^{‡}
1978–1985	Greece	27	(0)
- * Club domestic league appearances and goals as of 3 February 2011 ‡ National team caps and goals as of 3 February 2011

Charalampos "Babis" Xanthopoulos (Greek: Χαράλαμπος "Μπάμπης" Ξανθόπουλος; born 29 August 1956) is a former Greek footballer.

== Club career ==
Xanthopoulos spent most of his career with Iraklis being third in league appearances for the club with 283. Xanthopoulos was in the starting line-up of Iraklis in the 1976 Cup final, that earned him and the club the only nationwide title to date. He finished his career with Pierikos appearing in 52 matches for the club and scoring 7 goals.

== International career ==
Xanthopoulos earned 27 caps for the Greece national football team, and participated in UEFA Euro 1980. He made his debut in an away win against Australia on 11 June 1978.

== Achievements ==
Iraklis

- Greek Cup (1): 1975–76
