= Dimitrios Gesios =

Greek footballer (born 1948)

Dimitris Gesios
Personal information
- Full name: Dimitrios Gesios
- Date of birth: 24 October 1948 (age 78)
- Place of birth: Monospita, Greece
- Height: 1.82 m (5 ft 11 1/2 in)
- Position: Striker

Senior career*
Years	Team	Apps	(Gls)
1969–1972	Kozani		(31)
1972–1980	Iraklis	211	(74)
1980–1981	AEK Athens	22	(7)
1981–1982	Veria		

International career^{‡}
1976–1978	Greece	5	(0)
- * Club domestic league appearances and goals as of 5 October 2013 ‡ National team caps and goals as of 5 October 2013

Dimitrios Gesios (Greek: Δημήτριος Γκέσιος; born 1948) is a former Greek international football player that played as a striker. Gesios spend most of his professional career with Iraklis, where he is their all-time top scorer.

== Club career ==
Gesios started his professional career in Kozani, when he was in the town to fulfill his military service. In the summer of 1972 after several teams expressed their interest and a short trial at Aris, Gesios signed for Iraklis. He was Iraklis' league top scorer for 1973–74, 1975–76, 1976–77 and 1977–78 scoring 12, 9, 12 and 13 goals respectively. He was also in the starting line up in Iraklis' 1976 Cup win and scored the club's fourth goal in overtime. Gesios played for Iraklis until 1980, reaching 74 league goals and becoming the club's league all-time top scorer.

On 7 July 1980, Gesios signed for AEK Athens for a fee of 1.5 million drachmas. He played with the club for one season scoring 22 appearances and 7 goals. On 13 August 1981, he was transferred to Veria for a fee of 400,000 drachmas, where he finished his career after a season at the club.

== International career ==
Gesios made his debut for Greece in a friendly 0–1 home defeat against Israel on 22 September 1976. Totally he gained 5 caps for Greece.

== After football ==
Gesios lives in Kozani where he runs a furniture store.

== Honours ==
Iraklis

- Greek Cup: 1975–76
