= Antonio Justo Alcibar =

Argentine footballer

Antonio Justo Alcíbar
Personal information
- Date of birth: 30 December 1944 (age 81)
- Place of birth: Bengolea, Córdoba, Argentina
- Position: Forward

Senior career*
Years	Team	Apps	(Gls)
1963–1966	Newell's Old Boys		
1968–1969	Nueva Chicago		
1971	Racing Club		
1972–1973	Olympiacos	7	(0)
1974–1975	San Andrés		
1976	Sarmiento		
- * Club domestic league appearances and goals

Antonio Justo Alcíbar (born 30 December 1944) is a retired Argentine football player who played for Olympiacos in the 1972–73 season.

Alcíbar also played in the Spanish second division with C.D. San Andrés during the 1974–75 season.
