= Achilleas Grammatikopoulos =

Greek footballer

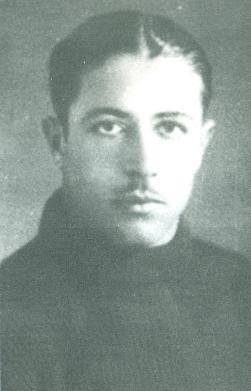

Personal information
- Date of birth: 28 September 1908
- Place of birth: Piraeus, Greece
- Date of death: 30 December 2008 (aged 100)
- Place of death: Piraeus, Greece
- Position: Goalkeeper

Senior career*
Years	Team	Apps	(Gls)
- Aris Nikaia
1928–1944	Olympiacos		

International career
1931–1935	Greece	5	(0)
- * Club domestic league appearances and goals

Achilleas Grammatikopoulos (Greek: Αχιλλέας Γραμματικόπουλος) (16 May 1908 – 30 December 2008) was a Greek association football player. He was considered one of the most prolific goalkeepers in the Greek league during the late 1920s and the early 1930s.

Grammatikopoulos was born in Piraeus in 1908. He started his football career at Aris Nikaia before transferring to Olympiakos whose nets he guarded from his debut on 4 November 1928 until 1944. He was considered one of the top keepers of the pre-WWII era and was capped 5 times by the Greece national team. His nickname during that time was "Zamora" after Ricardo Zamora, the top Spaniard goalkeeper of the same era.

Grammatikopoulos saw action in World War II. After his playing career was over, he stayed on in football as a referee. On 30 December 2008, he died in Piraeus of natural causes, at the age of 100.
