= José Segura =

José Segura may refer to:

- Pep Segura (born 1961), Spanish football coach
- José Segura (baseball) (born 1963), Dominican baseball player
