= Leonidas Leonidou =

Author and researcher

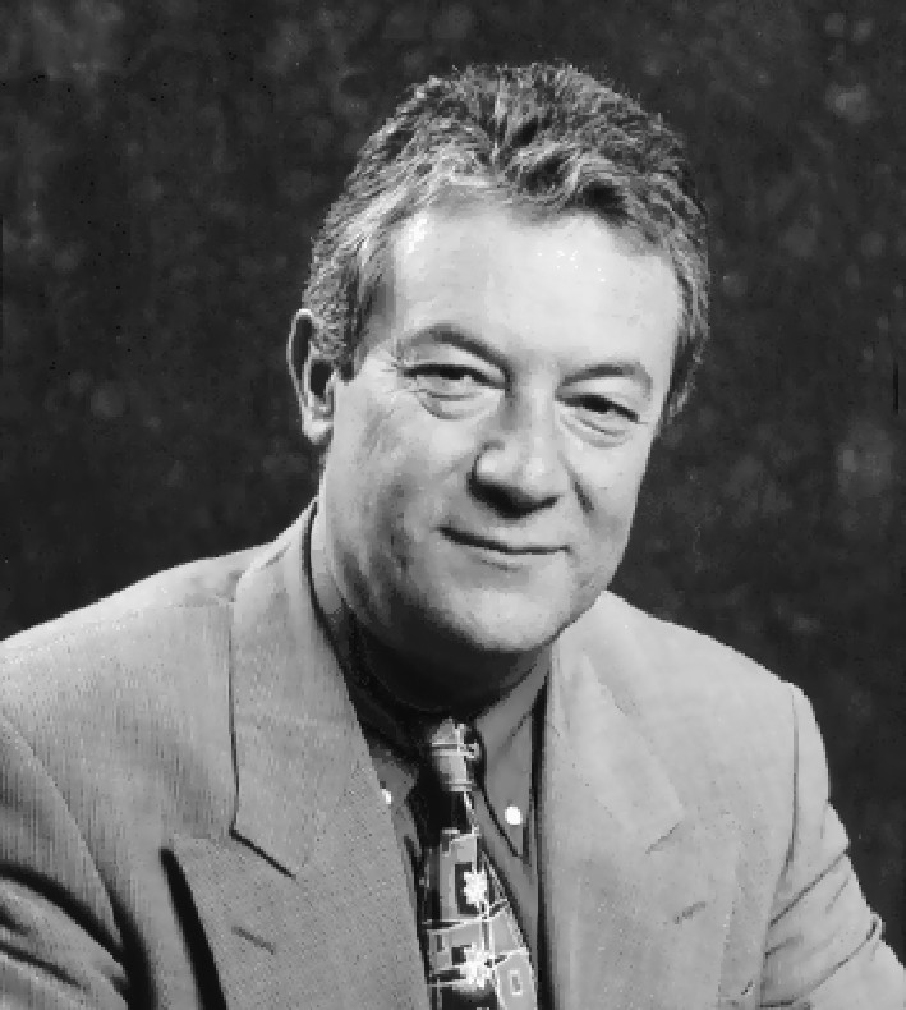
Leonidas P.Leonidou

Leonidas Leonidou is an author and researcher, born in Agios Theodoros in the Karpas peninsula of Cyprus on October 13, 1947.

== Early life ==
He graduated from the Greek Gymnasium of Famagusta in 1965 and in the following two years he served in the Cyprus National Guard. From 1967 to 1971 he studied physics at the University of Athens and graduated from the University of Cardiff, Wales, with a master's degree in electronics.

== Career ==
In January 1974 he returned to Cyprus and worked for NCR as a systems analyst up to the Turkish invasion of Cyprus in July 1974 during which he served in the Cyprus National Guard 386 Battalion. After his demobilization in September 1974 he returned to Britain and joined ATV and then British Telecom (then Post Office). He worked at the BT Research Centre in the microelectronics division, on the development of data networks and subsequently headed the IT department of Greater London and Southeast England. Later on he consulted with companies in the same sector.

He was president of student and later of Greek Diaspora organizations and was actively involved in the Justice for Cyprus campaign. From 1978 he became involved with the UK Greek education and researched extensively Cyprus' modern history. He is married to Anne-Marie Leonidou traditional Greek dance teacher and they live in London

== Author ==
He is the author of many books amongst which the award-winning book Ayios Theodoros Karpasias, Place and People (1986), the four-volume work Georgios Grivas Digenis - Biography (1995, 1997, 2008, 2008) and the books Makrasyka, Place and People (2010), With Sword and Fire (2013) and The Last Escapee (2014). Many of his articles were published in newspapers, magazines and periodicals in Cyprus, Greece and the United Kingdom.
