= María Elena Estavillo Flores =

Mexican Economist

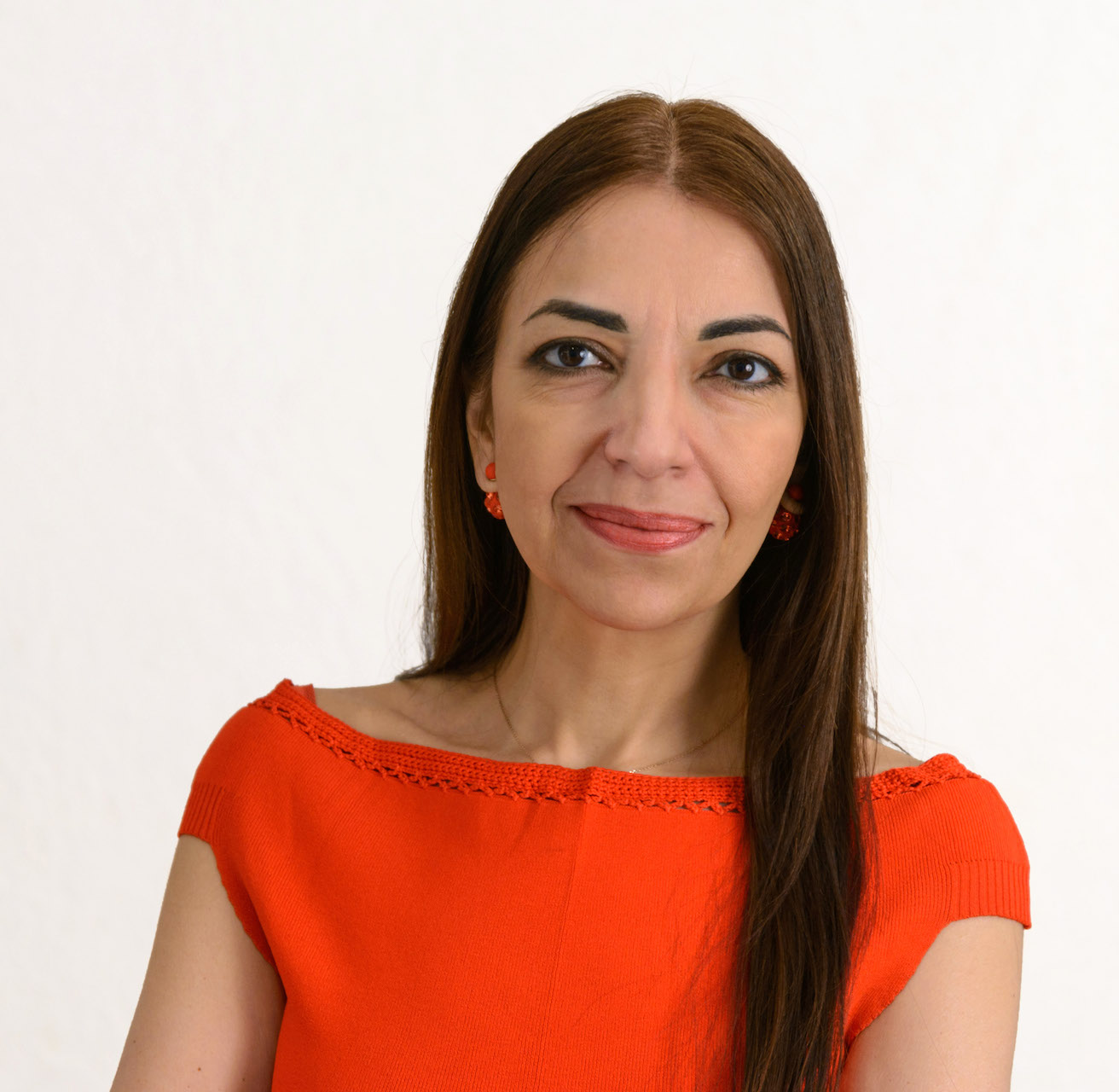

Federal Telecommunications Institute Commissioner

Personal details
- Education: PhD University of Paris, Nanterre
- Alma mater: ITESM
- Profession: Economist

María Elena Estavillo Flores is a Mexican economist, academic and former Commissioner of the Federal Telecommunications Institute. She holds a bachelor's degree in economics from ITESM as well as M.A. and PhD in economics from the University of Paris. In 2016 and 2017 consecutively, she was featured in Forbes magazine as one of the country's most powerful women. She was also listed as one of the most relevant women in the field in the world by "Global Competition Review".

== Bibliography ==
- María Elena Estavillo Flores; Rodrigo Morales Elcoro (2007). La prevención de colusiones. Editorial Porrúa. ISBN 978-970-07-7201-1. OCLC 227030225.
