= 1980–81 Alpha Ethniki =

45th season of top-tier football league in Greece

Alpha Ethniki
- Season: 1980–81
- Champions: Olympiacos; 22nd Greek title
- Relegated: Panachaiki; Atromitos
- European Cup: Olympiacos
- UEFA Cup: Aris; Panathinaikos
- Cup Winners' Cup: PAOK
- Matches: 306
- Goals: 709 (2.32 per match)
- Top goalscorer: Dinos Kouis (21 goals)

The 1980–81 Alpha Ethniki was the 45th season of the highest football league of Greece. The season began on 7 September 1980 and ended on 14 June 1981. Olympiacos won their second consecutive and 22nd Greek title.

The point system was: Win: 2 points - Draw: 1 point.

== Teams ==
Promoted from 1979–80 Beta Ethniki	Relegated from 1979–80 Alpha Ethniki
Atromitos; Panserraikos	Iraklis; Rodos

Location of teams in 1980–81 Alpha Ethniki

== League table ==
Pos	Team	Pld	W	D	L	GF	GA	GD	Pts	Qualification or relegation
1	Olympiacos (C)	34	20	9	5	47	18	+29	49	Qualification for European Cup first round
2	AEK Athens	34	17	10	7	63	42	+21	44	
3	Aris	34	16	11	7	57	33	+24	43	Qualification for UEFA Cup first round
4	PAOK	34	15	12	7	52	31	+21	42	Qualification for Cup Winners' Cup first round (Note: Since Olympiacos, winners of 1980–81 Greek Football Cup, was qualified for the 1981–82 European Cup, losing cup finalists PAOK earned a spot in the first round of the 1981–82 European Cup Winners' Cup.)
5	Panathinaikos	34	13	13	8	44	21	+23	39	Qualification for UEFA Cup first round
6	AEL	34	14	9	11	42	40	+2	37	
7	Ethnikos Piraeus	34	11	12	11	45	32	+13	34	
8	Panserraikos	34	10	14	10	42	41	+1	34	
9	Doxa Drama	34	10	13	11	38	42	−4	33	
10	OFI	34	11	10	13	33	37	−4	32	
11	PAS Giannina	34	11	9	14	43	47	−4	31	
12	Apollon Athens	34	12	7	15	31	47	−16	31	
13	Panionios	34	9	12	13	45	49	−4	30	
14	Kastoria	34	12	6	16	43	56	−13	30	
15	Kavala	34	10	9	15	28	47	−19	29	
16	Korinthos	34	9	9	16	27	42	−15	27	
17	Panachaiki (R)	34	9	8	17	21	36	−15	26	Relegation to Beta Ethniki
18	Atromitos (R)	34	4	13	17	19	59	−40	21	Relegation to Beta Ethniki

Source: RSSSF
Rules for classification: 1st points; 2nd decision match; 3rd head-to-head goal difference.
(C) Champions; (R) Relegated

== Results ==
Home \ Away	AEK	AEL	APA	ARIS	ATR	DOX	ETH	KAS	KAV	KOR	OFI	OLY	PNC	PAO	PAN	PNS	PAOK	PAS
AEK Athens		1–1	3–0	4–4	3–0	2–1	0–0	3–1	5–1	4–0	3–0	2–1	3–1	0–0	3–1	2–1	4–0	3–2
AEL	2–1		3–1	0–0	3–0	3–0	3–1	6–2	0–3	2–0	1–0	0–1	2–0	1–0	1–1	2–0	0–0	1–0
Apollon Athens	0–0	0–0		0–2	2–1	2–0	1–0	3–0	4–2	2–0	0–0	0–0	1–0	1–0	3–0	2–1	1–0	0–1
Aris	1–1	3–4	6–1		1–0	1–0	0–0	2–1	4–0	3–0	4–0	0–0	2–1	2–0	3–2	0–0	0–1	4–1
Atromitos	1–2	0–0	0–0	1–1		1–1	1–1	2–1	1–1	0–0	1–0	0–1	1–0	0–2	2–2	1–1	0–2	0–0
Doxa Drama	2–2	4–1	1–0	2–1	1–1		1–0	1–1	1–1	1–0	0–0	2–0	1–2	1–0	3–3	1–0	0–0	4–1
Ethnikos Piraeus	0–2	1–1	1–2	0–0	10–0	3–0		5–0	4–0	2–0	1–0	0–2	2–0	0–0	1–1	2–0	0–2	1–0
Kastoria	2–3	1–0	4–0	0–2	3–1	0–0	5–1		6–0	1–0	2–0	0–0	1–0	1–1	2–0	1–0	1–1	3–0
Kavala	1–0	0–0	0–0	1–2	3–0	0–0	2–1	1–0		1–0	1–0	1–0	1–1	0–0	1–0	1–2	1–0	1–1
Korinthos	2–1	0–1	3–1	1–2	0–0	2–1	1–1	2–1	1–1		1–2	0–0	1–1	0–1	2–0	3–2	0–0	3–2
OFI	3–1	1–1	2–1	3–0	3–1	4–2	0–1	2–0	3–2	1–0		1–1	2–1	0–0	1–1	0–0	0–2	2–0
Olympiacos	6–0	3–1	3–1	2–0	3–1	3–2	1–0	3–0	2–0	0–0	2–1		1–0	0–0	1–2	1–0	1–0	2–0
Panachaiki	2–0	1–0	1–0	1–0	0–0	0–0	0–0	0–1	1–0	0–1	2–0	1–1		1–0	1–1	0–1	2–0	0–0
Panathinaikos	0–0	1–0	5–1	0–0	2–0	2–0	2–2	5–0	2–1	2–1	0–0	0–1	5–0		1–0	4–0	0–0	4–0
Panionios	1–1	4–1	2–0	3–2	1–2	3–1	0–2	4–0	2–0	0–0	0–0	0–1	2–1	0–0		3–4	1–1	1–0
Panserraikos	1–1	2–0	1–1	0–0	3–0	1–1	3–0	1–1	1–0	2–0	3–1	1–3	1–0	2–2	1–1		1–1	2–2
PAOK	1–2	5–1	3–0	1–1	2–0	2–2	1–1	3–1	2–0	4–2	1–0	1–0	3–0	4–2	4–1	3–3		1–1
PAS Giannina	3–1	3–0	2–0	2–4	4–0	0–1	1–1	4–0	1–0	0–1	1–1	1–1	2–0	2–1	3–2	1–1	2–1	

Source: RSSSF
Legend: Blue = home team win; Yellow = draw; Red = away team win.

== Top scorers ==
Rank	Player	Club	Goals
1	(Greece) Dinos Kouis	Aris	21
2	(Greece) Grigoris Charalampidis	Doxa Drama	15
3	(Greece) Thomas Liolios	Kastoria	13
4	(Greece) Giannis Dintsikos	Kastoria	12
4	(Socialist Federal Republic of Yugoslavia) Dušan Bajević	AEK Athens	12
4	(Greece) Kostas Charalampidis	AEL	12
7	(Greece) Takis Papadimitriou	Panionios	11
7	(Greece) Giorgos Togias	Korinthos	11
9	(Greece) Giorgos Ananiadis	PAS Giannina	10
9	(Greece) Maik Galakos	Olympiacos	10
9	(Greece) Spyros Livathinos	Panionios	10
9	(Greece) Dimitris Seitaridis	Ethnikos Piraeus	10

== Attendances ==
Olympiacos drew the highest average home attendance in the 1980–81 Alpha Ethniki.

#	Team	Average attendance
1	Olympiacos	24,759
2	AEK Athens	17,168
3	Panathinaikos	15,659
4	Aris	13,098
5	PAOK	12,847
6	Ethnikos Piraeus	8,587
7	AEL	7,588
8	Panionios	7,085
9	Apollon Athens	6,288
10	PAS Giannina	5,657
11	Panachaiki	5,624
12	Atromitos	5,616
13	Korinthos	5,222
14	Doxa Drama	5,053
15	Panserraikos	4,835
16	Kavala	4,124
17	OFI	3,915
18	Kastoria	3,045
