= Vangelis Kousoulakis =

Greek footballer

Personal information
- Full name: Vangelis Kousoulakis
- Date of birth: 16 April 1954 (age 72)
- Place of birth: Thessaloniki, Greece
- Position: Midfielder

Senior career*
| Years | Team | Apps | (Gls) |
| 1971–1979 | Iraklis | 200 | (7) |
| 1979–1986 | Olympiacos | 169 | (24) |
| 1986–1988 | Apollon Kalamarias | 43 | (0) |

International career
| 1977–1983 | Greece | 15 | (1) |
- * Club domestic league appearances and goals

Vangelis Kousoulakis (Greek: Βαγγέλης Κουσουλάκης; born 16 April 1954) is a Greek former professional footballer who played as a midfielder.

== Career ==
He started his career at Iraklis in 1971. He was a part of the team that won the Greek Cup in 1976. In 1979, Kousoulakis joined Olympiacos winning four championships in 1980, 1981, 1982 and 1983. He played for them until the summer of 1986 when he transferred at Apollon Kalamarias. He ended his career in 1988.

== Honours ==
Iraklis

- Greek Cup: 1975–76

Olympiacos

- Alpha Ethniki: 1979–80, 1980–81, 1981–82, 1982–83
- Greek Cup: 1980–81
- Greek Super Cup: 1980
