= 1979–80 Alpha Ethniki =

44th season of top-tier football league in Greece

Alpha Ethniki
- Season: 1979–80
- Champions: Olympiacos; 21st Greek title
- Relegated: Iraklis; Rodos
- European Cup: Olympiacos
- UEFA Cup: Aris; Panathinaikos
- Cup Winners' Cup: Kastoria
- Matches: 306
- Goals: 708 (2.31 per match)
- Top goalscorer: Dušan Bajević (25 goals)

The 1979–80 Alpha Ethniki was the 44th season of the highest football league of Greece. From that season Alpha Ethniki became the professional league. The season began on 30 September 1979 and ended on 25 May 1980 with the play-off matches. Olympiacos won their 21st Greek title and their first one in five years.

The point system was: Win: 2 points - Draw: 1 point.

== Teams ==
Promoted from 1978–79 Beta Ethniki	Relegated from 1978–79 Alpha Ethniki
Korinthos; Doxa Drama	Kavala; Egaleo; Panserraikos

Location of teams in 1979–80 Alpha Ethniki

== League table ==
Pos	Team	Pld	W	D	L	GF	GA	GD	Pts	Qualification or relegation
1	Olympiacos (C)	34	20	7	7	49	21	+28	47 (Note: Championship play-off: Olympiacos–Aris 2–0)	Qualification for European Cup first round
2	Aris	34	19	9	6	46	20	+26	47	Qualification for UEFA Cup first round
3	Panathinaikos	34	15	15	4	38	24	+14	45 (Note: 3rd-place play-off: Panathinaikos–AEK Athens 1–0)	Qualification for UEFA Cup first round
4	AEK Athens	34	18	9	7	64	39	+25	45	
5	PAOK	34	17	7	10	53	33	+20	41	
6	PAS Giannina	34	14	9	11	50	44	+6	37	
7	Ethnikos Piraeus	34	13	10	11	44	31	+13	36	
8	Iraklis (R)	34	13	8	13	47	36	+11	34	Relegation to Beta Ethniki (Note: Iraklis were relegated because were found guilty of trying to bribe Filotas Pellios before the second semi-final for the Greek Cup.)
9	AEL	34	13	8	13	33	44	−11	34	
10	Korinthos	34	13	7	14	38	47	−9	33	
11	OFI	34	11	10	13	38	45	−7	32	
12	Doxa Drama	34	9	11	14	31	41	−10	29	
13	Panachaiki	34	7	14	13	38	51	−13	28	
14	Kastoria (Note: Kastoria were deducted 1 point.)	34	10	8	16	34	41	−7	27	Qualification for Cup Winners' Cup first round
15	Panionios	34	9	9	16	36	48	−12	27	
16	Kavala	34	10	7	17	26	46	−20	27	
17	Apollon Athens	34	5	13	16	17	37	−20	23	
18	Rodos (R)	34	5	9	20	26	60	−34	19	Relegation to Beta Ethniki

Source: RSSSF
Rules for classification: 1st points; 2nd decision match; 3rd head-to-head goal difference.
(C) Champions; (R) Relegated

== Results ==
Home \ Away	AEK	AEL	APA	ARIS	DOX	ETH	IRA	KAS	KAV	KOR	OFI	OLY	PNC	PAO	PAN	PAOK	PAS	ROD
AEK Athens		4–2	2–1	1–1	2–0	2–1	1–0	4–2	4–2	5–1	2–1	0–1	2–2	0–1	5–2	3–1	1–1	6–1
AEL	1–3		0–0	2–3	1–0	3–1	3–0	1–0	1–0	2–0	1–1	0–0	2–1	1–0	2–0	0–2	0–0	1–0
Apollon Athens	0–0	0–1		0–0	0–0	1–0	3–1	2–0 (Note: Apollon Athens-Kastoria 0-0, awarded 2-0, because Kastoria had illegally used a player.)	0–1	0–1	0–0	0–0	0–0	2–2	0–2	1–0	0–0	1–0
Aris	0–0	4–0	3–1		5–0	0–2	1–1	3–0	1–0	1–0	1–0	2–1	1–0	0–0	1–0	2–0	3–0	2–0
Doxa Drama	1–3	3–1	1–1	0–0		0–0	1–0	1–0	1–0	2–1	3–0	1–0	2–2	0–0	0–0	1–1	4–0	4–0
Ethnikos Piraeus	2–1	6–2	4–1	0–2	2–0		2–2	0–1	0–1	4–4	2–0	1–2	2–2	0–0	0–0	1–0	3–1	4–0
Iraklis	3–0	0–2	3–0	0–2	2–0	1–0		3–1	2–0	1–0	1–2	0–0	3–0	6–0	4–0	1–1	2–1	2–1
Kastoria	1–1	1–0	4–0	1–1	1–1	0–0	0–1		0–1	3–0	4–1	1–0	4–0	1–1	1–0	0–0	3–0	2–2
Kavala	2–4	2–0	0–0	0–0	2–2	0–1	0–0	1–0		0–1	1–0	1–0	4–1	0–0	0–0	0–1	0–0	1–0
Korinthos	0–1	1–1	2–0	2–1	1–0	0–3	3–1	1–0	2–0		1–0	2–2	0–0	0–0	4–2	3–1	0–0	1–0
OFI	0–0	1–1	2–0	1–0	1–0	0–0	1–1	3–1	4–0	1–0		2–0	5–3	0–3	1–1	2–1	4–1	0–0
Olympiacos	0–0	4–0	1–0	1–0	3–1	2–0	2–1	2–1	4–0	1–0	2–0		3–2	1–0	1–0	2–0	4–0	5–0
Panachaiki	1–3	1–0	2–1	2–0	2–1	0–0	1–1	0–0	2–0	4–1	2–2	0–0		0–0	1–1	1–1	0–1	3–1
Panathinaikos	1–0	1–0	0–0	3–3	2–0	1–1	1–0	2–0	2–1	0–0	2–1	2–0	3–1		3–0	0–0	1–0	2–0
Panionios	0–0	0–1	2–1	0–1	3–0	0–1	2–1	0–1	3–0	2–4	2–2	0–2	3–0	2–2		2–1	2–0	2–1
PAOK	4–0	4–0	1–0	2–0	1–0	1–0	2–1	3–0	6–2	3–1	3–0	2–0	2–2	0–2	3–1		2–1	4–1
PAS Giannina	3–2	1–1	1–1	0–1	4–1	1–0	2–1	3–0	4–0	3–1	4–0	1–1	1–0	4–1	2–0	3–0		4–2
Rodos	0–2	0–0	1–0	0–1	0–0	0–1	1–1	3–0	0–4	3–0	2–0	1–2	1–0	0–0	2–2	0–0	3–3	

Source: RSSSF
Legend: Blue = home team win; Yellow = draw; Red = away team win.

=== Play-offs ===
==== Championship play-off ====
25 May 1980

Olympiacos	2–0	Aris
Kousoulakis 46'; Ahlström 59'	Report

Volos Municipal Stadium, Volos
Attendance: 17,200
Referee: Christos Charalampidis (Athens)

==== Third place play-off ====
24 May 1980
21:00 EEST

Panathinaikos	1–0	AEK Athens
Oré 61'	Report

Karaiskakis Stadium, Piraeus
Attendance: 18,350
Referee: Giorgos Ballis (Athens)

== Top scorers ==
Rank	Player	Club	Goals
1	(Socialist Federal Republic of Yugoslavia) Dušan Bajević	AEK Athens	25
2	(Greece) Georgios Kostikos	PAOK	16
2	(Greece) Thalis Tsirimokos	PAS Giannina	16
4	(Greece) Dimtris Spetzopulos	Panachaiki	15
5	(Greece) Dimitris Seitaridis	PAS Giannina	14
5	(Greece) Giorgos Kalampakas	Iraklis	14
5	(Greece) Thomas Mavros	AEK Athens	14
5	(Greece) Dimitris Pittas	Korinthos	14
9	(Greece) Giorgos Pissas	Korinthos	11
10	(Greece) Maik Galakos	Olympiacos	10
10	(Greece) Dimitris Tsironis	Kastoria	10
10	(Greece) Christos Yfantidis	Panathinaikos	10
10	(Greece) Thomas Liolios	Panionios / Kastoria	10

== Attendances ==
Olympiacos drew the highest average home attendance in the 1979–80 Alpha Ethniki.

#	Team	Average attendance
1	Olympiacos	24,791
2	Panathinaikos	18,510
3	AEK Athens	16,423
4	PAOK	15,239
5	Aris	13,319
6	Iraklis	11,395
7	Ethnikos Piraeus	11,037
8	Korinthos	7,375
9	Panachaiki	6,601
10	Panionios	6,582
11	Apollon Athens	6,200
12	AEL	6,174
13	Doxa Drama	5,618
14	PAS Giannina	5,230
15	Kavala	4,634
16	OFI	4,188
17	Rodos	3,648
18	Kastoria	2,627
