= Vicente Estavillo =

Uruguayan footballer (born 1955)

Personal information
- Full name: Vicente Estavillo
- Date of birth: 17 May 1955 (age 71)
- Place of birth: Melo, Uruguay
- Position: Striker

Senior career*
Years	Team	Apps	(Gls)
1975–1978	Peñarol		
1978–1981	Montevideo Wanderers		
1981–1983	Olympiacos	40	(0)
1983–1984	PAS Giannina	11	(1)
1985	Auburn Uruguay		
1986–1987	Sydney Olympic	43	(8)

International career
- Uruguay

Managerial career
- 1994–1995: Sydney Olympic
- 2003: Stanmore Hawks
- 2007–2008: Cerro Largo
- * Club domestic league appearances and goals

Vicente Estavillo (born 17 May 1955) is a Uruguayan former football striker.

Estavillo played for C.A. Peñarol and Montevideo Wanderers F.C., then he moved to Greece and played for Olympiacos F.C. He was the hero of 1982 Greek Championship as he scored the first goal against Panathinaikos (2-1 title match in Volos). The next year Estavillo scored the winning goal against Panathinaikos in a match in near the end of the 1983 Greek Championship giving to Olympiakos the opportunity to win the Greek Championship as he did. He also played for PAS Giannina.

Estavillo then moved to Australia where he played in the National Soccer League for Sydney Olympic.

Estavillo became the manager of Cerro Largo in December 2007.
