= Zoran Antonijević =

Serbian footballer (1945–2008)

Personal information
- Date of birth: 21 October 1945
- Place of birth: Belgrade, DF Yugoslavia
- Date of death: February 5, 2008 (aged 62)
- Place of death: Belgrade, Serbia
- Position: Midfielder

Youth career
- 21.maj Rakovica

Senior career*
Years	Team	Apps	(Gls)
1966–1967	IM Rakovica		
1967–1975	Red Star Belgrade	154	(18)
1975–1977	Iraklis	56	(1)

International career
1970–1972	Yugoslavia	8	(0)
- * Club domestic league appearances and goals

Zoran "Žota" Antonijević (Serbian Cyrillic: Зоран Антонијевић; 21 October 1945 – 5 February 2008) was a Serbian professional footballer who played as a midfielder for SFR Yugoslavia.

== Club career ==
Antonijević scored 65 goals in 429 matches in all competitions for Red Star Belgrade between 1967 and 1975, winning 4 league titles and 3 domestic cups.

== International career ==
Aćimović made his debut for Yugoslavia in a November 1970 friendly match against West Germany and earned a total of 8 caps. His final international was a May 1972 European Championship qualification match away against the Soviet Union.

== Honours ==
Red Star Belgrade

- Yugoslav First League: 4

1968, 1969, 1970, 1973

- Yugoslav Cup: 3

1968, 1970, 1971
