= Giannis Andrianopoulos =

Greek footballer and manager

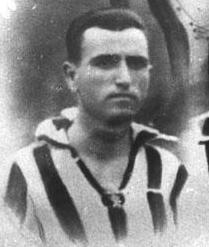

Personal information
- Full name: Ioannis Andrianopoulos
- Date of birth: 1900
- Place of birth: Piraeus, Greece
- Date of death: 6 November 1952 (aged 51–52)
- Positions: Attacking midfielder; second striker

Youth career
- 1915–1918: Peiraikos Syndesmos

Senior career*
| Years | Team | Apps | (Gls) |
| 1918–1923 | Peiraikos Syndesmos | | |
| 1924 | Athletic and Football Club of Piraeus | | |
| 1924–1925 | Olympiacos Omilos Filathlon Peiraia | | |
| 1925–1929 | Olympiacos | | |

International career
| 1920 | Greece Olympic | 1 | (0) |

Managerial career
- 1925–1927: Olympiacos
- * Club domestic league appearances and goals

Giannis Andrianopoulos (Greek: Γιάννης Ανδριανόπουλος; 1900 – 6 November 1952) was a Greek footballer and one of the founding members of Greece's most successful football club, Olympiacos CFP.

== Club career ==
Born in Piraeus, Greece, Andrianopoulos began his career at the age of 18, playing for local club Peiraikos Syndesmos. There, he earned his first taste of success, winning an unofficial Greek Championship in 1923. Peiraikos Syndesmos merged with Peiraiki Enosis in January 1924 and the Athletic and Football Club of Piraeus was formed. Andrianopoulos was part of the new team and helped them win the 1924 Athens-Piraeus championship.

== Olympiacos ==
The same year around autumn, the new club split in two different squads: One team, led by the Andrianopoulos brothers and goalkeeper Kostas Klidouchakis, formed Olympiacos Omilos, which evolved into Olympiacos; the other, led by Kostas Ferlemis, Christos Peppas and Giorgos Chatziandreou merged, with an independent club named "Young Boys" to form Peiraikos Omilos, which in turn evolved into Ethnikos Piraeus.

Following a series of mergers between other Piraeus and Athens based clubs, as well as an Athens football Championship, Andrianopoulos and his brothers went on to create Olympiacos in March 1925. Giannis, Georgios, Konstantinos and Vasilios, Leonidas went on to make the newly formed Piraeus Club famous throughout Greece. Two other brothers, Aristides and Stelios Andrianopoulos, were playing in other Piraeus football clubs.

Giannis Andrianopoulos was the oldest of seven brothers who, like him, would go on to become famous footballers in the Olympiacos' ranks. As a result, Yiannis and his brothers earned Olympiacos the name Thrylos meaning "Legend" in Greek, a nickname which the club carries to this day. Giannis was certainly the brother who made the biggest impact towards the club, even becoming a player-coach; Olympiacos' first coach, from 1925 until 1927. In 1929, he retired from football, and became Olympiacos' president for 3 years.

== International ==
Andrianopoulos played for the national side for the 1920 Olympic Games. His brother Giorgos was a member of the team too. His brothers at Olympiacos also played for Greece in 1929 and 1930.

== Honours ==
- Olympiacos First Manager
- Olympic Football Tournament Final
- President of Olympiacos (1929–1932)
- President of E.P.S.P & Hellenic Football Federation
