= Takis Synetopoulos =

Greek footballer

Personal information
- Full name: Dimitrios Synetopoulos
- Date of birth: 25 December 1948 (age 77)
- Place of birth: Volos, Kingdom of Greece
- Date of death: 30 November 2013 (aged 64)
- Position: Defender

Senior career*
Years	Team	Apps	(Gls)
1963–1970	Olympiacos Volos		
1970–1978	Olympiacos		
1974	→ Toronto Homer (loan)		
1979–1983	Olympiacos Volos		
1983–1984	PAS Lamia		

International career
1965–1966	Greece U19	4	(0)
1970–1975	Greece	16	(0)
- * Club domestic league appearances and goals

Dimitrios "Takis" Synetopoulos (25 December 1948 – 30 November 2013) was a Greek footballer who played as a defender, and played with the Greece national football team.

== Career ==
Synetopoulos played with Olympiacos Volos in 1963. In 1970, he played in the Alpha Ethniki with Olympiacos In his debut season he assisted Olympiacos in securing the 1970–71 Greek Football Cup. Throughout his tenure with Olympiacos he assisted in securing three consecutive league titles. He also assisted in winning the 1974–75 Greek Football Cup.

Synetopoulos featured in several European tournaments during his time with Olympiacos where he played in the 1972–73 UEFA Cup, 1976–77 UEFA Cup, 1978–79 UEFA Cup. He also played in the 1971–72 European Cup Winners' Cup, 1973–74 European Cup, and 1975–76 European Cup. In the summer of 1974 he played abroad in the National Soccer League with Toronto Homer. In 1979, he returned to his former club Olympiacos Volos, and later finished his career with PAS Lamia 1964.

He died on 30 November 2013.

== International career ==
Synetopoulos played with the Greece national football team, and represented the team in 16 matches.
