= Giannis Kyrastas =

Greek footballer and manager (1952–2004)

Personal information
- Full name: Ioannis Kyrastas
- Date of birth: 25 October 1952
- Place of birth: Piraeus, Greece
- Date of death: 1 April 2004 (aged 51)
- Place of death: Athens, Greece
- Position: Defender

Youth career
- –1972: Olympiacos

Senior career*
Years	Team	Apps	(Gls)
1972–1981	Olympiacos	223	(4)
1981–1986	Panathinaikos	145	(1)
Total		368	(5)

International career
1974–1985	Greece	46	(0)

Managerial career
- 1987–1988: Ethnikos Ellinoroson
- 1988–1989: A.E. Messolonghi
- 1989: Proodeftiki
- 1990–1991: Ethnikos Piraeus
- 1991–1993: Proodeftiki
- 1993–1994: Panionios
- 1994–1995: Panargiakos
- 1995–1996: Ethnikos Piraeus
- 1996: Paniliakos
- 1997: Panionios
- 1997–1999: Paniliakos
- 1999–2000: Panathinaikos
- 2000–2001: Iraklis
- 2001–2002: Panathinaikos
- * Club domestic league appearances and goals

Giannis Kyrastas (Greek: Γιάννης Κυράστας; 25 October 1952 – 1 April 2004) was a Greek footballer and a later manager.

== Club career ==
Born in Piraeus, Kyrastas started his football career in Olympiacos, where he played his first game on 10 December 1972 against Kavala. With Olympiacos he played 223 games, 16 of them in European competitions, and won five Greek Championships and three Greek Cups.

In 1981, he went, together with Maik Galakos, to archrival Panathinaikos, where he played in 145 games, 14 of them in European competitions, and won two Greek Championships and three Greek Cups. He retired in 1986 after playing his last game against Aris in November.

Kyrastas made 46 appearances for the Greece national team, from 15 November 1974 to 19 May 1985. He also played in the 1980 UEFA European Championship.

== Managerial career ==
After retiring, he became a manager. Starting in the 1987–88 season and until 2001 he successfully coached many teams, including Ethnikos Piraeus, Paniliakos (twice), Panionios, Iraklis and finally Panathinaikos. After his second time as manager of Panathinaikos, he retired from coaching.

== Death ==
Kyrastas was admitted on 5 March 2004 to hospital with septicaemia, after being infected with the rare Fournier gangrene. His condition was said to be improving, but on, 30 March he went into a decline from which he was not to recover. He died on 1 April 2004 at the age of 51.

The football players and staff of Panathinaikos, devoted the Double of 2004 in his memory.
