= Lakis Glezos =

Greek footballer

Personal information
- Full name: Apostolos Glezos
- Date of birth: 4 February 1947
- Place of birth: Piraeus, Greece
- Date of death: 18 June 2007 (aged 60)
- Place of death: Piraeus, Greece
- Position: Defender

Youth career
- 1961–1963: Ermis Nikaia

Senior career*
Years	Team	Apps	(Gls)
1963–1972	Proodeftiki		
1972–1978	Olympiacos	129	(1)
1978–1979	Kallithea	8	(0)

International career
1971–1974	Greece	10	(1)
- * Club domestic league appearances and goals

Apostolos "Lakis" Glezos (Greek: Απόστολος "Λάκης" Γκλέζος; 4 February 1947 – 18 June 2007) was a Greek football defender.

== Career ==
Born in Piraeus, Glezos began playing football as a defender for the youth sides of Atromitaki and Ermis Nikaia. In 1963, he joined Proodeftiki F.C., where he would play for nine seasons. Glezos helped Proodeftiki achieve a fourth-place finish in the Alpha Ethniki during the 1964–65 season.

In 1972, Glezos joined Olympiacos where he played until 1978, winning three Alpha Ethniki and two Greek Football Cup titles. He finished his career with Kallithea, suffering a serious knee injury in 1979. All told, Glezos made over 260 appearances in the Greek first and second divisions.

Glezos made 10 appearances and scored one goal for the Greece national football team from 1971 to 1974. He made his debut as a second-half substitute in a 1–0 UEFA Euro 1972 qualifying defeat to Switzerland on 12 May 1971.

== Personal life ==
Glezos died after a long battle with cancer at age 60.
