= Maik Galakos =

Greek footballer

Personal information
- Full name: Ilias Galakos
- Date of birth: 23 November 1951 (age 74)
- Place of birth: Kalogreza, Nea Ionia, Greece
- Position: Striker

Senior career*
Years	Team	Apps	(Gls)
1970–1972	VfB Bottrop		
1972–1973	Fortuna Düsseldorf	2	(0)
1973–1981	Olympiacos	183	(64)
1977–1978	→ FC St. Pauli (loan)	0	(0)
1981–1985	Panathinaikos	72	(15)
Total		257	(79)

International career
1976–1982	Greece	30	(5)

Managerial career
- 1996: Panathinaikos
- * Club domestic league appearances and goals

Ilias "Maik" Galakos (Greek: Μάικ Γαλάκος) is a Greek former professional footballer who played as a striker and was active during the 1970s and 1980s.

Galakos was born on 23 November 1951 in Kalogreza, Greece and his family emigrated to Germany where he first played football for Fortuna Düsseldorf (1972–1973). He returned to Greece and played for Olympiacos from 1973 to 1981 before signing with Panathinaikos. Galakos played for the greens between 1981 and 1985. He retired after playing in 255 Alpha Ethniki matches.

Galakos was capped 30 times by the Greece national team, scoring five goals.

== Career statistics ==
Appearances and goals by club, season and competition
Club	Season	League		
Club	Season	Division	Apps	Goals
Fortuna Düsseldorf	1972–73	Bundesliga	2	0
Olympiacos	1973–74	Alpha Ethniki	9	1
Olympiacos	1974–75	Alpha Ethniki	18	5
Olympiacos	1975–76	Alpha Ethniki	18	9
Olympiacos	1976–77	Alpha Ethniki	28	16
Olympiacos	1977–78	Alpha Ethniki	29	9
Olympiacos	1978–79	Alpha Ethniki	24	4
Olympiacos	1979–80	Alpha Ethniki	26	10
Olympiacos	1980–81	Alpha Ethniki	31	10
FC St. Pauli (loan)	1977–78	Bundesliga	0	0
Panathinaikos	1981–82	Alpha Ethniki	29	8
Panathinaikos	1982–83	Alpha Ethniki	9	0
Panathinaikos	1983–84	Alpha Ethniki	30	7
Panathinaikos	1984–85	Alpha Ethniki	4	0
Career total			257	79

== Honours ==
Olympiacos

- Alpha Ethniki: 1973–74, 1974–75, 1979–80, 1980–81
- Greek Cup: 1974–75, 1980–81

Panathinaikos

- Alpha Ethniki: 1983–84
- Greek Cup: 1981–82, 1983–84
