= 1980–81 Greek Football Cup =

1980–81 Greek Cup
Tournament details
- Country: Greece
- Teams: 58

Final positions
- Champions: Olympiacos (17th title)
- Runners-up: PAOK

Tournament statistics
- Matches played: 70
- Goals scored: 185 (2.64 per match)

The 1980–81 Greek Football Cup was the 39th edition of the Greek Football Cup.

== Tournament details ==
Totally 58 teams participated, 18 from Alpha Ethniki and 40 from Beta Ethniki. It was held in six rounds, included the final. Concerning the two previous years, two-legged tie would be extended in third round too.

Even if many Alpha Ethniki teams eliminated from the first round, afterwards there were very interesting matches. AEK Athens had the most difficult draws, after they eliminated Panathinaikos and Aris, in order to be eliminated by PAOK with two losses in the semi-finals (second leg became in Chalcis due to punishment).

Olympiacos had to win Panionios during the extra time of second leg in third round in order to qualify, while the surprise of season were Panegialios, which qualify to semi-finals, after qualifies against OFI and Doxa Drama, both teams of Alpha Ethniki. They achieved good results in away second legs.

The final was contested by Olympiacos and PAOK, after 7 years and in the same stadium (AEK Stadium). Olympiacos won 3–1, clinching the double after also winning the championship. The match was marked by riots between fans of both teams, one of the first expressions of hooliganism that was imported in Greece in the beginning of 1980 decade.

It is still characteristic that the footballers of both teams played wearing black brassards, Olympiacos players mourning the victims of tragedy of gate 7, and PAOK players in memory of their coach Gyula Lóránt, who had died at the bench on 31 May 1981.

== Calendar ==
Round	Date(s)	Fixtures	Clubs	New entries
First Round	29, 30 October & 6 November 1980	28	58 → 29	58
Second Round	17, 18 December 1980	13	29 → 16	none
Round of 16	7, 8 January & 4, 5 February 1981	16	16 → 8	none
Quarter-finals	13, 27 May 1981	8	8 → 4	none
Semi-finals	3, 10 June 1981	4	4 → 2	none
Final	21 June 1981	1	2 → 1	none

== Knockout phase ==
Each tie in the knockout phase, apart from the first two rounds and the final, was played over two legs, with each team playing one leg at home. The team that scored more goals on aggregate over the two legs advanced to the next round. If the aggregate score was level, the away goals rule was applied, i.e. the team that scored more goals away from home over the two legs advanced. If away goals were also equal, then extra time was played. The away goals rule was again applied after extra time, i.e. if there were goals scored during extra time and the aggregate score was still level, the visiting team advanced by virtue of more away goals scored. If no goals were scored during extra time, the winners were decided by a penalty shoot-out. In the first two rounds and the final, which were played as a single match, if the score was level at the end of normal time, extra time was played, followed by a penalty shoot-out if the score was still level.
The mechanism of the draws for each round is as follows:

- There are no seedings, and teams from the same group can be drawn against each other.

== First round ==
Team 1	Score	Team 2
Veria	2–1	Apollon Athens
Aris	3–0	Pelopas Kiato
Kavala	1–0	PAS Giannina
Chalkida	1–3	Olympiacos
Apollon Kalamarias	2–2 (3–5 p)	Pandramaikos
Panetolikos	0–1	Atromitos
Agrotikos Asteras	2–0	Ilisiakos
Acharnaikos	5–1	Proodeftiki
Makedonikos	1–1 (3–5 p)	Kastoria
P.O. Elassona	4–1	A.P.S. Patras
Korinthos	1–1 (6–5 p)	Iraklis
Kallithea	1–0	Naoussa
AEK Athens	6–2	Egaleo
Olympiacos Volos	3–1	Vyzas Megara
Panserraikos	1–0 (a.e.t.)	AEL
Irodotos	3–1	Panelefsiniakos
Panegialios	2–0	Almopos Aridea
Niki Volos	1–1 (3–5 p)	PAOK
Diagoras	1–2 (a.e.t.)	OFI
Panarkadikos	2–0	Xanthi
Eordaikos	1–0 (a.e.t.)	Panachaiki
Olympiacos Liosia	0–1	Doxa Drama
Panionios	5–0	Panthrakikos
Anagennisi Epanomi	0–1	Trikala
Fostiras	4–0	Olympiakos Loutraki
Ethnikos Piraeus	0–0 (3–4 p)	Anagennisi Giannitsa
Pierikos	1–0 (a.e.t.)	Edessaikos
Ethnikos Asteras	2–1	Odysseas Kordelio
Rodos	1–2	Panathinaikos

== Bracket ==
Second round
Irodotos	0(2)
Panegialios (p)	0(4)
OFI	3
Agrotikos Asteras	0
Fostiras	0
Pandramaikos	1
P.O. Elassona	2
Doxa Drama	4
Korinthos	3
Panarkadikos	1
Kavala (bye)
Olympiacos	5
Pierikos	0
Panionios (bye)
Veria	0
PAOK	2
Olympiacos Volos	2
Anagennisi Giannitsa	0
Eordaikos (p)	1(6)
Trikala	1(5)
Ethnikos Asteras (a.e.t.)	2
Kallithea	1
Panathinaikos	3
Panserraikos	0
AEK Athens	2
Kastoria	0
Aris	5
Acharnaikos	1
Atromitos (bye)

Round of 16
Panegialios (a)	0	1	1
OFI	0	1	1
Pandramaikos	1	0	1
Doxa Drama	2	0	2
Korinthos	2	0	2(1)
Kavala (p)	0	2	2(3)
Olympiacos (a.e.t.)	0	2	2
Panionios	0	0	0
PAOK	2	2	4
Olympiacos Volos	1	1	2
Eordaikos	2	0	2
Ethnikos Asteras	2	2	4
Panathinaikos	3	0	3
AEK Athens (a)	2	1	3
Aris	1	1	2
Atromitos	0	0	0

Quarter-finals
Panegialios	0	3	3
Doxa Drama	1	1	2
Kavala	0	0	0
Olympiacos	0	2	2
PAOK	5	3	8
Ethnikos Asteras	0	2	2
AEK Athens	2	1	3
Aris	2	0	2

Semi-finals
Panegialios	0	1	1
Olympiacos	3	3	6
PAOK	1	2	3
AEK Athens	0	0	0

Final
Olympiacos	3
PAOK	1

== Second round ==
Team 1	Score	Team 2
Korinthos	3–1	Panarkadikos
Ethnikos Asteras	2–1 (a.e.t.)	Kallithea
Olympiacos	5–0	Pierikos
OFI	3–0	Agrotikos Asteras
P.O. Elassona	2–4	Doxa Drama
Eordaikos	1–1 (6–5 p)	Trikala
Olympiacos Volos	2–0	Anagennisi Giannitsa
Panathinaikos	3–0	Panserraikos
Veria	0–2	PAOK
AEK Athens	2–0	Kastoria
Fostiras	0–1	Pandramaikos
Irodotos	0–0 (2–4 p)	Panegialios
Aris	5–1	Acharnaikos
Kavala	bye	
Panionios	bye	
Atromitos	bye	

== Round of 16 ==
Team 1	Agg.	Team 2	1st leg	2nd leg
PAOK	4–2	Olympiacos Volos	2–1	2–1
Aris	2–0	Atromitos	1–0	1–0
Korinthos	2–2 (1–3 p)	Kavala	2–0	0–2 (a.e.t.)
Pandramaikos	1–2	Doxa Drama	1–2	0–0
Eordaikos	2–4	Ethnikos Asteras	2–2	0–2
Panathinaikos	3–3 (a)	AEK Athens	3–2	0–1
Olympiacos	2–0	Panionios	0–0	2–0 (a.e.t.)
Panegialios	(a) 1–1	OFI	0–0	1–1

== Quarter-finals ==
Team 1	Agg.	Team 2	1st leg	2nd leg
AEK Athens	3–2	Aris	2–2	1–0
Kavala	0–2	Olympiacos	0–0	0–2
PAOK	8–2	Ethnikos Asteras	5–0	3–2
Panegialios	3–2	Doxa Drama	0–1	3–1

== Semi-finals ==
Team 1	Agg.	Team 2	1st leg	2nd leg
Panegialios	1–6	Olympiacos	0–3	1–3
PAOK	3–0	AEK Athens	1–0	2–0

== Final ==
21 June 1981
21:30 EEST

Olympiacos	3–1	PAOK
Damanakis 18' (o.g.); Orfanos 61'; Kousoulakis 92'	Report	Damanakis 63'

AEK Stadium, Nea Filadelfia
Attendance: 30,512
Referee: Nikos Zlatanos (Thessaloniki)
