= 2002–03 AEK Athens F.C. season =

AEK Athens
2002–03 season
- Chairman: Charilaos Psomiadis (until 22 January); Giannis Granitsas
- Manager: Dušan Bajević
- Stadium: Nikos Goumas Stadium
- Alpha Ethniki: 3rd
- Greek Cup: Semi-finals
- UEFA Champions League: Group stage
- UEFA Cup: Round of 16
- Top goalscorer: League: Demis Nikolaidis (12); All: Demis Nikolaidis (16)
- Highest home attendance: 19,775 vs Genk (30 October 2002)
- Lowest home attendance: 69 vs Kassandra (11 September 2002)
- Average home league attendance: 5,178
- Biggest win: AEK Athens 6–0 Panachaiki
- Biggest defeat: AEK Athens 3–4 PAOK; Akratitos 3–2 AEK Athens; Panathinaikos 2–1 AEK Athens; AEK Athens 0–1 Málaga; AEK Athens 0–1 PAOK; OFI 1–0 AEK Athens
Home colours	Away colours	Third colours

The 2002–03 season was the 79th season in the existence of AEK Athens F.C. and the 44th consecutive season in the top flight of Greek football. They competed in the Alpha Ethniki, the Greek Cup, the UEFA Champions League and the UEFA Cup. The season began on 8 August 2002 and finished on 25 May 2003.

== Kits ==
Supplier: Nike
Sponsor(s): Piraeus Bank
Features: Telestet

Home	Away	Third

== Overview ==
For the second season in a row under the management of Makis Psomiadis, who had assembled a good team the previous season. Despite the team's good performance in the last season, Fernando Santos resigned due to the disrupted relationship with the administrative leader of the club. Afterwards Psomiadis made a controversial decision and brought Dušan Bajević back to the club after six years. The return of Bajević received a divided reaction, since a portion of the supporters did not want him in the club at all, others seemed to want him back due to his successful previous spell, while many seemed to view him strictly as a professional. Despite the problems he faced from time to time from a large portion of the crowd, Bajević was able to do his job without much trouble. Regarding the team's roster and the transfers of the summer of 2002, Carlos Gamarra departed as his loan ended, while Akis Zikos, not having the best relationship with Psomiadis, also left the club. On the other hand, Psomiadis made many transfers of prominent players such as Georgatos, Katsouranis, Borbokis, Wright, Centeno, Kreek, Nalitzis and Prieto.

AEK Athens presented an attractive team and produced several strong performances throughout the championship. Despite long periods of good form, they were left behind in the title race during the earlier stages of the season. However, a streak of 12 wins in the final 12 matches brought AEK back into contention for the title. Ultimately, they finished third, two points behind Olympiacos and Panathinaikos, who were tied in first place, with the former winning the title.

AEK once again had the opportunity to compete in the Champions League, entering the qualifying round. In the draw, AEK were among the seeded clubs and were drawn against APOEL. The first match took place in Cyprus, where APOEL took the lead early on and AEK turned the match around through two goals by Vasilios Borbokis. In the final minutes APOEL managed to equalise from the penalty spot, but AEK in the stoppage time with a goal by Nikolaidis secured a 3–2 victory. In the rematch of Athens, AEK missed several chances but the half ended without a goal. At the beginning of the second half, AEK took the lead and secured qualification for the group stage. AEK were drawn in Group C alongside the "galacticos" of Real Madrid, the historic Roma and Genk, where they achieved a record of drawing all six of the group stage games, but failed to qualify for the next stage of the competition, finishing third and continued to the knock-out stage of the UEFA Cup.

AEK continued in the UEFA Cup and faced the Israeli Maccabi Haifa. The first match in Athens, Maccabi came in stronger and won a penalty that hit the crossbar. From there on, AEK came to life and established a 4–0 lead by the 35th minute, which remained until the final whistle. In the match, Michalis Kasapis became the Greek footballer with the most appearances in European matches. Moreover, the last goal of the match by Theodoros Zagorakis would become the last goal scored by AEK in European matches at the Nikos Goumas Stadium, before its demolition. In the rematch that took place at GSP Stadium in Nicosia, the Israelis again entered the match better, winning an early penalty and taking the lead, but AEK took control of the match and scored four goals to secure not only the victory but also a triumphant qualification. In the round of 16, AEK faced Málaga. In the first match at La Rosaleda Stadium, the Spaniards came on strong and missed scoring chances, but the yellow-black defense stood up well and the match ended 0–0. The rematch at Nea Filadelfeia proved to be of historical importance, since it was the last European game at Nikos Goumas Stadium. The match did not go well for AEK, who conceded a goal in the first half and were unable to turn the situation around with the 0–1 score remained as the final score, ending their European campaign.

In the Cup, AEK initially eliminated Kassandra and Chalkidona. In the round of 16, they were drawn with Apollon Smyrnis, whom they also eliminated easily, and in the quarter-finals they faced Panionios, whom they eliminated with the qualification being decided in the rematch at Nikos Goumas Stadium. In the semi-finals they were placed against PAOK. In the first match in Nea Filadelfeia, AEK did not put in a good performance and were defeated 1–0. In the rematch of Toumba Stadium, AEK took an early lead, levelling the aggregate score, but eventually a late equaliser resulted in their elimination.

A notable event of the season was the conflict against Makis Psomiadis, who as the season progressed began to lose support within the club. In January, Demis Nikolaidis filed a lawsuit against Psomiadis, who had come by his house at 3 a.m. to check if the footballer was staying overnight. Nikolaidis accused Psomiadis of blackmailing, insulting and threatening his life and physical integrity, while the footballer stated that during the incident, apart from Psomiadis, some of his bodyguards were also present. Having lost all support within the club, Psomiadis left and AEK Athens continued with an administration under the president of Amateur AEK, Giannis Granitsas. The season was also punctuated by the demolition of Nikos Goumas Stadium on 5 May 2003, home to AEK Athens for 73 years.

== Management team ==
Position	Staff
Manager	(Bosnia and Herzegovina) Dušan Bajević
Assistant manager	(Greece) Takis Persias
Goalkeeping coach	(Bosnia and Herzegovina) Jovan Mihailović
Academy director	(Greece) Andreas Stamatiadis
Academy manager	(Greece) Giorgos Karafeskos
Fitness coach	(Greece) Dimitris Bouroutzikas
Scout	(Greece) Antonis Drakopoulos
Head of Medical	(Greece) Lakis Nikolaou

== Players ==
=== Squad information ===
NOTE: The players are the ones that have been announced by the AEK Athens' press release. No edits should be made unless a player arrival or exit is announced. Updated 25 May 2003, 23:59 UTC+3.

No.	Player	Nat.	Position(s)	Date of birth (Age)	Signed	Previous club	Transfer fee	Contract until
Goalkeepers
12	Sotiris Liberopoulos	(Greece)	GK	29 June 1977 (aged 26)	2001	(Greece) Kalamata	Free	2004
22	Dionysis Chiotis	(Greece)	GK	4 June 1977 (aged 26)	1995	(Greece) AEK Athens U20	—	2005
33	Chrysostomos Michailidis	(Greece)	GK	15 January 1975 (aged 28)	1997	(Greece) Eordaikos	Free	2005
—	Giannis Arabatzis	(Greece)	GK	28 May 1984 (aged 19)	2002	(Greece) Enosi Apostolou Pavlou	€22,000	2007
Defenders
2	Vasilios Borbokis (Captain)	(Greece)	RB / RM	10 February 1969 (aged 34)	2002	(Greece) PAOK	Free	2003
5	Nikos Kostenoglou	(Greece)	CB / RB	3 October 1970 (aged 32)	1994	(Greece) Skoda Xanthi	€200,000	2003
8	Michel Kreek	(Netherlands)	LB / CB / LM / CM / DM	16 January 1971 (aged 32)	2002	(Netherlands) Vitesse	€500,000	2004
16	Nikolaos Georgeas	(Greece)	RB / LB / DM	27 December 1976 (aged 26)	2001	(Greece) Kalamata	€1,500,000	2004
17	Michalis Kasapis (Vice-captain 3)	(Greece)	LB / LM	6 August 1971 (aged 31)	1993	(Greece) Levadiakos	€75,000	2006
19	Mauricio Wright	(Costa Rica)	CB / RB	20 December 1970 (aged 32)	2002	(Costa Rica) Herediano	Free	2005
25	Stelios Maistrellis	(Greece)	CB	10 November 1979 (aged 23)	2002	(Greece) Aiolikos	Free	2006
31	Grigoris Georgatos	(Greece)	LB / LM / LW / CM	31 October 1972 (aged 30)	2002	(Italy) Internazionale	€3,000,000	2005
32	Michalis Kapsis	(Greece)	CB	18 October 1973 (aged 29)	1999	(Greece) Ethnikos Piraeus	€250,000	2003
40	Grigoris Toskas	(Greece)	CB	8 January 1983 (aged 20)	2000	(Greece) AEK Athens U20	—	2005
81	Stathis Kappos	(Greece) (Canada)	RB	31 July 1979 (aged 23)	2001	(Greece) Kalamata	Free	2005
Midfielders
6	Theodoros Zagorakis	(Greece)	CM / DM / AM / RM / CB / RB	27 October 1971 (aged 31)	2000	(England) Leicester City	Free	2003
7	Christos Maladenis	(Greece)	CM / RM / LM / AM / DM / RW / LW / SS	23 May 1974 (aged 29)	1995	(Greece) Skoda Xanthi	€300,000	2003
10	Vasilios Tsiartas (Vice-captain 2)	(Greece)	AM / RM / LM / SS	12 November 1972 (aged 30)	2000	(Spain) Sevilla	€3,500,000	2003
13	Giorgos Passios	(Greece) (Australia)	DM / CM / CB	4 May 1980 (aged 23)	1997	(Greece) AEK Athens U20	—	2003
14	Ivan Rusev	(Bulgaria)	AM / RM / LM / CM	10 May 1979 (aged 24)	2001	(Bulgaria) Spartak Varna	Free	2005
18	Walter Centeno	(Costa Rica)	AM / RM / LM / CM	6 October 1974 (aged 28)	2002	(Costa Rica) Saprissa	€410,000	2007
21	Kostas Katsouranis	(Greece)	CM / DM / RM / LM / AM / CB / RB / LB	21 June 1979 (aged 24)	2002	(Greece) Panachaiki	Free	2005
23	Vasilios Lakis	(Greece)	RM / RW / AM / CM / RB	10 September 1976 (aged 26)	1998	(Greece) Paniliakos	€1,000,000	2003
28	Milen Petkov	(Bulgaria)	DM / CM / AM / RM / LM	12 January 1974 (aged 29)	2000	(Bulgaria) CSKA Sofia	€800,000	2003
34	Nikos Pourtoulidis	(Greece)	CM / AM	7 October 1983 (aged 19)	2002	(Greece) Nea Karvali	Free	2006
—	Dimitris Karameris	(Greece)	CM / DM	16 April 1983 (aged 20)	2000	(Greece) AEK Athens U20	—	2005
Forwards
9	Ilias Solakis	(Greece)	ST	15 December 1974 (aged 28)	2002	(Cyprus) APOEL	Free	2007
11	Demis Nikolaidis (Vice-captain)	(Greece) (Germany)	ST / SS	17 September 1973 (aged 29)	1996	(Greece) Apollon Athens	€1,000,000	2004
15	Livio Prieto	(Argentina)	LW / LM / SS / AM	31 July 1981 (aged 21)	2002	(Argentina) Independiente	Free	2004
20	Sotiris Konstantinidis	(Greece)	RW / LW / RM / LM / AM	19 April 1979 (aged 24)	1999	(Greece) Iraklis	Free	2004
24	Christos Kostis	(Greece)	SS / ST / AM / RW / LW	15 January 1972 (aged 31)	2000	(Belgium) Anderlecht	Free	2005
30	Ilija Ivić	(Serbia and Montenegro)	ST / LW	17 February 1971 (aged 32)	2002	(Greece) Aris	Free	2005
37	Dimitris Nalitzis	(Greece)	ST	25 January 1976 (aged 27)	2002	(Italy) Udinese	Free	2003
Left during Winter Transfer Window
1	Ilias Atmatsidis	(Greece)	GK	24 April 1969 (aged 34)	1992	(Greece) Pontioi Veria	€120,000	2004

== Transfers ==
=== In ===
==== Summer ====
No.	Pos.	Player	From	Fee	Date	Contract Until	Source
2	DF	(Greece) Vasilios Borbokis	(Greece) PAOK	Free transfer	1 July 2002	30 June 2003	
8	DF	(Netherlands) Michel Kreek	(Netherlands) Vitesse	€500,000	28 June 2002	30 June 2004	
9	FW	(Greece) Ilias Solakis	(Cyprus) APOEL	Free transfer	5 August 2002	30 June 2007	
12	GK	(Greece) Sotiris Liberopoulos	(Belgium) La Louvière	Loan termination	7 September 2002	30 June 2004	
14	FW	(Argentina) Emanuel Ruiz	(Argentina) Unión Santa Fe	Loan return	1 July 2002	30 June 2005	
15	FW	(Argentina) Livio Prieto	(Argentina) Independiente	Free transfer	7 July 2002	30 June 2004	
18	MF	(Costa Rica) Walter Centeno	(Costa Rica) Saprissa	€410,000	8 July 2002	30 June 2007	
19	DF	(Costa Rica) Mauricio Wright	(Costa Rica) Herediano	Free transfer	5 July 2002	30 June 2005	
21	MF	(Greece) Kostas Katsouranis	(Greece) Panachaiki	Free transfer	1 July 2002	30 June 2005	
25	DF	(Greece) Stelios Maistrellis	(Greece) Aiolikos	Free transfer	7 June 2002	30 June 2007	
31	DF	(Greece) Grigoris Georgatos	(Italy) Internazionale	€3,000,000	22 July 2002	30 June 2005	
33	GK	(Greece) Chrysostomos Michailidis	(Greece) Ethnikos Asteras	Loan return	1 July 2002	30 June 2005	
34	MF	(Greece) Nikos Pourtoulidis	(Greece) Nea Karvali	Free transfer	10 June 2002	30 June 2007	
35	MF	(Bulgaria) Ivan Rusev	(Greece) Apollon Smyrnis	Loan return	1 July 2002	30 June 2005	
36	FW	(Greece) Georgios Trichias	(Greece) Apollon Smyrnis	Loan return	1 July 2002	31 December 2005	
—	GK	(Greece) Giannis Arabatzis	(Greece) Enosi Apostolou Pavlou	€22,000	16 June 2002	30 June 2007	
—	DF	(Greece) Christos Pitos	(Greece) Marko	Loan return	1 July 2002	30 June 2006	

==== Winter ====
No.	Pos.	Player	From	Fee	Date	Contract Until	Source
9	FW	(Greece) Ilias Solakis	(Greece) Panionios	Loan return	1 January 2003	30 June 2007	
14	MF	(Bulgaria) Ivan Rusev	(Greece) Athinaikos	Loan return	1 January 2003	30 June 2005	

=== Out ===
==== Summer ====
No.	Pos.	Player	To	Fee	Date	Source
3	DF	(Brazil) Ferrugem	Free agent	Contract termination	9 July 2002	
4	DF	(Paraguay) Carlos Gamarra	(Brazil) Flamengo	Loan return	1 July 2002	
12	DF	(Greece) Georgios Xenidis	(Greece) Iraklis	Contract termination	31 July 2002	
14	MF	(Greece) Akis Zikos	(France) Monaco	Free transfer	1 July 2002	
14	FW	(Argentina) Emanuel Ruiz	Free agent	Contract termination	31 July 2002	
15	DF	(Madagascar) Éric Rabésandratana	Free agent	Contract termination	28 August 2002	
19	MF	(Albania) Bledar Kola	(Greece) Kallithea	Contract termination	7 July 2002	
21	DF	(Greece) Vaios Karagiannis	(Greece) Poseidon Neon Poron	End of contract	1 July 2002	
26	FW	(Portugal) António Folha	(Portugal) Porto	Loan return	1 July 2002	
33	MF	(Argentina) Fernando Navas	Free agent	Contract termination	23 July 2002	
36	FW	(Greece) Georgios Trichias	(Greece) Kalamata	Free transfer	1 July 2002	
—	DF	(Greece) Christos Pitos	(Greece) Pierikos	Contract termination	23 July 2002	

==== Winter ====
No.	Pos.	Player	To	Fee	Date	Source
1	GK	(Greece) Ilias Atmatsidis	(Greece) PAOK	Contract termination	17 January 2003	

=== Loan in ===
==== Summer ====
No.	Pos.	Player	From	Fee	Date	Until	Option to buy	Source
88	FW	(Greece) Dimitris Nalitzis	(Italy) Udinese	Free	4 August 2002	30 June 2003	✓	

=== Loan out ===
==== Summer ====
No.	Pos.	Player	To	Fee	Date	Until	Option to buy	Source
9	FW	(Greece) Ilias Solakis	(Greece) Panionios	Free	5 August 2002	31 December 2002	✗	
27	GK	(Greece) Sotiris Liberopoulos	(Belgium) La Louvière	Free	22 July 2002	30 June 2003	✗	
35	MF	(Bulgaria) Ivan Rusev	(Greece) Athinaikos	Free	28 July 2002	31 December 2002	✗	

=== Contract renewals ===
No.	Pos.	Player	Date	Former Exp. Date	New Exp. Date	Source
1	GK	(Greece) Ilias Atmatsidis	25 June 2002	30 June 2002	30 June 2004	
24	FW	(Greece) Christos Kostis	5 June 2002	30 June 2002	30 June 2005	

=== Overall transfer activity ===
==== Expenditure ====
Summer: ▼€3,932,000

Winter: ▼€0

Total: ▼€3,932,000

==== Income ====
Summer: ▲€0

Winter: ▲€0

Total: ▲€0

==== Net Totals ====
Summer: ▼€3,932,000

Winter: €0

Total: ▼€3,932,000

== Pre-season and friendlies ==
6 July 2002 Friendly	UFC Jennersdorf	0–4	AEK Athens	Jennersdorf
19:30 EEST (UTC+3)		Report	Passios; Kostis; Trichias; Petkov	Stadium: Sportplatz Jennersdorf

12 July 2002 Friendly	Wiener Neustädter	1–6	AEK Athens	Wiener Neustadt
20:30 EEST (UTC+3)	Salek 62'	Report	Burgemaister 16' (o.g.); Lakis 49'; Ivić 51', 65'; Maladenis 61'; Tsiartas 68'	Stadium: Stadion Wiener Neustadt

14 July 2002 Friendly	NK Varteks	2–4	AEK Athens
18:00 EEST (UTC+3)	Karić 55', 68' (pen.)	Report	Maladenis 2', 57'; Ivić 34'; Lakis 64'

17 July 2002 Friendly	Hajduk Split	1–2	AEK Athens	Dietersdorf am Gnasbach
19:30 EEST (UTC+3)	Erceg 13'	Report	Nikolaidis 32'; Lakis 78'	Stadium: Wald Stadium

21 July 2002 Friendly	Gençlerbirliği	2–0	AEK Athens
19:30 EEST (UTC+3)	Hassan 7'; Mbayo 57'	Report

24 July 2002 Friendly	AEK Athens	4–0	Proodeftiki	Nea Filadelfeia
21:30 EEST (UTC+3)	Tsiartas 48'; Nikolaidis 56'; Lakis 62'; Poulopoulos 77' (o.g.)	Report		Stadium: Nikos Goumas Stadium; Attendance: 5,000

29 July 2002 Friendly	AEK Athens	1–0	Panachaiki	Nea Filadelfeia
21:30 EEST (UTC+3)	Tsiartas (penalty missed) 88', 90+1'	Report		Stadium: Nikos Goumas Stadium; Attendance: 2,000; Referee: Frangiskos Somarakakis (Athens)

31 July 2002 Friendly	AEK Athens	5–1	Beşiktaş	Nea Filadelfeia
21:00 EEST (UTC+3)	Wright 10'; Nikolaidis 20', 35'; Lakis 23', 25'	Report	Cansun 44'	Stadium: Nikos Goumas Stadium; Attendance: 5,000

5 August 2002 Friendly	AEK Athens	2–2	Panionios	Nea Filadelfeia
21:00 EEST (UTC+3)	Centeno 31'; Tsiartas 60'	Report	Horký 45'; Šiljak 78'	Stadium: Nikos Goumas Stadium; Referee: Giannis Tsachilidis (Piraeus)

18 August 2002 Friendly	Levadiakos	1–3	AEK Athens	Livadeia
18:00 EEST (UTC+3)	Tsangaris 45'	Report	Livio Prieto 41'; Centeno 69'; Ivić 85'	Stadium: Levadia Municipal Stadium; Attendance: 1,000; Referee: Giannis Spyropoulos (Phthiotis)

== Competitions ==
=== Overall record ===
Competition	First match	Last match	Starting round	Final position	Record							
Competition	First match	Last match	Starting round	Final position	Pld	W	D	L	GF	GA	GD	Win %
Alpha Ethniki	24 August 2002	25 May 2003	Matchday 1	3rd	30	21	5	4	74	29	+45	70.00
Greek Cup	8 August 2002	7 May 2003	First round	Semi-finals	10	6	3	1	19	6	+13	60.00
UEFA Champions League	13 August 2002	12 November 2002	Third qualifying round	Group stage	8	2	6	0	11	9	+2	25.00
UEFA Cup	28 November 2002	27 February 2003	Round of 32	Round of 16	4	2	1	1	8	2	+6	50.00
Total					52	31	15	6	112	46	+66	59.62

Last updated: 25 May 2003
Source: Competitions

=== Alpha Ethniki ===
==== League table ====
Pos	Team	Pld	W	D	L	GF	GA	GD	Pts	Qualification or relegation
1	Olympiacos (C)	30	21	7	2	75	21	+54	70 (Note: Head-to-head points (goal difference): Olympiacos 3 (+2), Panathinaikos 3 (-2).)	Qualification for Champions League group stage
2	Panathinaikos	30	22	4	4	50	19	+31	70	Qualification for Champions League group stage
3	AEK Athens	30	21	5	4	74	29	+45	68	Qualification for Champions League third qualifying round
4	PAOK	30	16	5	9	59	38	+21	53 (Note: Head-to-head points (goal difference): PAOK 3 (+1), Panionios 3 (-1).)	Qualification for UEFA Cup first round
5	Panionios	30	15	8	7	35	25	+10	53	Qualification for UEFA Cup first round

Source: Galanis Sports Data
Rules for classification: 1) Points; 2) Head-to-head points; 3) Head-to-head goal difference; 4) Goal difference; 5) Goals scored; 6) Goals against; 7) Play-offs (neutral ground); 8) Draw.
(Note: Criterion 7 is only used if needed to decide champion, teams for relegation or teams for UEFA competitions).
(C) Champions

==== Results summary ====
Overall								Home						Away					
Pld	W	D	L	GF	GA	GD	Pts	W	D	L	GF	GA	GD	W	D	L	GF	GA	GD
30	21	5	4	74	29	+45	68	13	1	1	51	17	+34	8	4	3	23	12	+11

Source: Competitive matches

==== Results by Matchday ====
Round	1	2	3	4	5	6	7	8	9	10	11	12	13	14	15	16	17	18	19	20	21	22	23	24	25	26	27	28	29	30
Ground	A	H	H	A	H	A	H	A	H	A	A	H	A	H	A	H	A	A	H	A	H	A	H	A	H	H	A	H	A	H
Result	D	W	W	W	W	L	D	L	L	D	W	W	D	W	D	W	W	L	W	W	W	W	W	W	W	W	W	W	W	W
Position	8	6	2	2	1	3	2	4	8	8	5	4	5	4	4	4	4	5	4	4	3	3	3	3	3	3	3	3	3	3

Source: Competitive matches
A = Away; H = Home; W = Win; D = Draw; L = Loss; P = Postponed

==== Matches ====
24 August 2002 1	Egaleo	1–1	AEK Athens	Ampelokipoi
21:00 EEST (UTC+3)	Fotakis (yellow card) 36'; Meidanis 41'; Alexopoulos (yellow card) 43'; Christou (yellow card) 45+1'; Edusei (yellow card) 87'		Nikolaidis 21'; Tsiartas (yellow card) 76'; Maladenis (yellow card) 76'	Stadium: Leoforos Alexandras Stadium; Attendance: 3,879; Referee: Giorgos Kasnaferis (Athens)

1 September 2002 2	AEK Athens	3–1	PAS Giannina	Nea Filadelfeia
17:30 EEST (UTC+3)	Tsiartas (penalty missed) 18', 44' (pen.); Ivić 19'; Nikolaidis 48'; Lakis (yellow card) 59'		Nikolaidis (yellow card) 45'; Gittas 58'; Xhumba (yellow card) 70'	Stadium: Nikos Goumas Stadium; Attendance: 4,288; Referee: Makis Efthimiadis (Drama)

14 September 2002 3	AEK Athens	1–0	Panathinaikos	Nea Filadelfeia
19:00 EEST (UTC+3)	Ivić 41', (yellow card) 66'; Zagorakis (yellow card) 88'; Petkov (yellow card) 90+1'		P. Konstantinidis (yellow card) 30'; Basinas (yellow card) 40'; Seitaridis (yellow card) 42' (yellow-red card) 82'; Kyrgiakos (yellow card) 57'; Vlaović (yellow card) 82'; Karagounis (yellow card) 90+1'	Stadium: Nikos Goumas Stadium; Attendance: 13,801; Referee: Giorgos Douros (Corinthia)

22 September 2002 4	Skoda Xanthi	0–1	AEK Athens	Xanthi
18:00 EEST (UTC+3)	Papadimitriou (yellow card) 67'		Nikolaidis 12'; Zagorakis (yellow card) 87'; Michailidis (yellow card) 90+1'	Stadium: A.O. Xanthi Stadium; Attendance: 5,508; Referee: Giannis Tsachilidis (Piraeus)

26 October 2002 5	AEK Athens	1–0	Kallithea	Nea Filadelfeia
17:00 EEST (UTC+3)	Tsiartas 7' (pen.); Georgatos (yellow card) 10'; Chiotis (yellow card) 28'		Georgiev (yellow card) 7'; Tsalikis (yellow card) 23'; Dimitriou (yellow card) 32'	Stadium: Nikos Goumas Stadium; Attendance: 6,766; Referee: Nikos Angelakis (Thessaloniki)

3 November 2002 6	OFI	1–0	AEK Athens	Heraklion
17:00 EET (UTC+2)	Adamos (yellow card) 38'; Kiassos 56', (yellow card) 75'; Kotsios (yellow card) 66'; Beqaj (yellow card) 82'		Centeno (yellow card) 54'; Kapsis (yellow card) 85' (yellow-red card) 90+2'	Stadium: Theodoros Vardinogiannis Stadium; Attendance: Behind closed doors Referee: Kyros Vassaras (Thessaloniki)

9 November 2002 7	AEK Athens	1–1	Olympiacos	Nea Filadelfeia
17:00 EET (UTC+2)	Wright (yellow card) 24'; Nikolaidis 44'; Borbokis (yellow card) 76'		Anatolakis (yellow card) 10'; Đorđević 30'	Stadium: Nikos Goumas Stadium; Attendance: 9,039; Referee: Nikos Angelakis (Thessaloniki)

24 November 2002 8	Akratitos	3–2	AEK Athens	Ano Liosia
19:00 EET (UTC+2)	Ziakas 30', 38'; Chavos (yellow card) 57'; Pozapalidis (yellow card) 67'; Ražanauskas 82'		Katsouranis (yellow card) 62'; Tsiartas 67', 84'	Stadium: Giannis Pathiakakis Stadium; Attendance: 1,503; Referee: Efthimios Damianos (Kozani)

1 December 2002 9	AEK Athens	3–4	PAOK	Nea Filadelfeia
19:00 EET (UTC+2)	Katsouranis 35'; Nikolaidis 45' (pen.); Wright (yellow card) 56'; Borbokis 77'; Chiotis (yellow card) 81'; Ivić (yellow card) 90+2'		Okkas 2', 18', 59', (yellow card) 81'; Nastos 28'; Majdan (yellow card) 45+6'; Koutsopoulos (yellow card) 76'; Frousos (yellow card) 88'	Stadium: Nikos Goumas Stadium; Attendance: 5,188; Referee: Giorgos Tsangarakis (Chania)

8 December 2002 10	Proodeftiki	1–1	AEK Athens	Nikaia
17:30 EET (UTC+2)	Pantos 29'; Al Zaher (yellow card) 49'; Kois (yellow card) 51'; Angelopoulos (yellow card) 53'; Tatsis (yellow card) 62'; Zajmi (yellow card) 65'; Kouloucheris (yellow card) 75'		Lakis (yellow card) 26'; Kasapis (yellow card) 27'; Konstantinidis 40'; Nikolaidis (penalty missed) 52'	Stadium: Nikaia Municipal Stadium; Attendance: 1,069; Referee: Stavros Georgopoulos (Arcadia)

16 December 2002 11	Iraklis	0–2	AEK Athens	Thessaloniki
17:00 EET (UTC+2)	Haxhi (yellow card) 9'; Murati (yellow card) 14'; Stoltidis (yellow card) 30'		Lakis (yellow card) 16'; Maladenis 17'; Kostenoglou (yellow card) 58'; Nikolaidis 80'; Kreek (yellow card) 87'	Stadium: Makedonikos Stadium; Attendance: 2,200; Referee: Giorgos Borovilos (Arcadia)

22 December 2002 12	AEK Athens	3–0	Ionikos	Nea Filadelfeia
15:00 EET (UTC+2)	Georgeas (yellow card) 35'; Konstantinidis 59'; Georgatos 67'; Nikolaidis 68'; Centeno (yellow card) 71'; Wright (yellow card) 78'		Flauto (yellow card) 4' (yellow-red card) 51'; Daraklitsas (yellow card) 34'; Koné (yellow card) 58'	Stadium: Nikos Goumas Stadium; Attendance: 3,018; Referee: Iraklis Tsikinis (Messinia)

5 January 2003 13	Aris	1–1	AEK Athens	Thessaloniki
19:00 EET (UTC+2)	Demba 17'; Braga (yellow card) 35'; Passalis (yellow card) 43'; Knopper (yellow card) 49'; Kyzeridis (yellow card) 88'		Katsouranis 20'; Petkov (yellow card) 38'; Nikolaidis (yellow card) 70'; Zagorakis (yellow card) 89'	Stadium: Aris Stadium; Attendance: 6,984; Referee: Giorgos Tsangarakis (Chania)

12 January 2003 14	AEK Athens	6–0	Panachaiki	Nea Filadelfeia
15:00 EET (UTC+2)	Nikolaidis 20'; Lakis 53', 57', 75'; Nalitzis 86' (pen.); Borbokis 88'		Skarmoutsos (yellow card) 41'; Gouziotis (yellow card) 72'	Stadium: Nikos Goumas Stadium; Attendance: 2,725; Referee: Giorgos Douros (Corinthia)

19 January 2003 15	Panionios	1–1	AEK Athens	Nea Smyrni
19:00 EET (UTC+2)	Ferekidis (yellow card) 27', (goal) 69'; Mantzios (yellow card) 41'; Giannopoulos (yellow card) 43'; Raguel (yellow card) 79'; Drobný (yellow card) 90+3'		Nalitzis 6'; Borbokis (yellow card) 27'; Wright (yellow card) 29'; Centeno (yellow card) 65'	Stadium: Nea Smyrni Stadium; Attendance: 6,128; Referee: Giannis Bisogiannis (Thessaloniki)

26 January 2003 16	AEK Athens	3–2	Egaleo	Nea Filadelfeia
17:00 EET (UTC+2)	Nalitzis 10', 40' (pen.), 55'; Zagorakis (yellow card) 14'; Katsouranis (yellow card) 63'; Georgatos (yellow card) 90+2'		Symeonidis 1'; Angos (yellow card) 8'; Meidanis (yellow card) 22'; Agritis 25'; Chloros (yellow card) 45+1' (yellow-red card) 53'	Stadium: Nikos Goumas Stadium; Attendance: 3,005; Referee: Giorgos Douros (Corinthia)

2 February 2003 17	PAS Giannina	0–2	AEK Athens	Ioannina
17:00 EET (UTC+2)	Kyparissis (yellow card) 15'; Telkiyski (yellow card) 33'; Sakellaridis (yellow card) 43'; Kakos (yellow card) 63'		Zagorakis (yellow card) 18'; Georgeas (yellow card) 51'; Lakis 66'; Nikolaidis 74'	Stadium: Zosimades Stadium; Attendance: 4,566; Referee: Vasilis Terovitsas (Aetoloacarnania)

9 February 2003 18	Panathinaikos	2–1	AEK Athens	Ampelokipoi
19:15 EET (UTC+2)	Liberopoulos 33'; Basinas 45', 71' (pen.); Olisadebe (yellow card) 51'		Zagorakis (yellow card) 30'; Kasapis (yellow card) 35'; Maladenis 37', (yellow card) 64'; Lakis (yellow card) 43'; Georgeas (yellow card) 70'; Nalitzis (red card) 90+1'	Stadium: Leoforos Alexandras Stadium; Attendance: 12,439; Referee: Kyros Vassaras (Thessaloniki)

16 February 2003 19	AEK Athens	3–2	Skoda Xanthi	Nea Filadelfeia
16:45 EET (UTC+2)	Lakis 48'; Maladenis 50'; Wright (yellow card) 81'; Nikolaidis (yellow card) 85'; Ivić 88'; Michailidis (yellow card) 90+5'		Vallas (yellow card) 32'; Zapropoulos (yellow card) 51'; Friesenbichler (yellow card) 66', (goal) 70'; Rabarivony 72'	Stadium: Nikos Goumas Stadium; Attendance: 2,765; Referee: Giannis Tsachilidis (Piraeus)

23 February 2003 20	Kallithea	1–3	AEK Athens	Kallithea
16:45 EET (UTC+2)	Savvidis 43'		Tsiartas 17', 37', 39'	Stadium: Grigoris Lambrakis Stadium; Attendance: 1,935; Referee: Giorgos Borovilos (Arcadia)

2 March 2003 21	AEK Athens	3–1	OFI	Nea Filadelfeia
15:00 EET (UTC+2)	Georgeas (yellow card) 33'; Lakis 54'; Ivić 66', 90+4'		Moschogiannis (yellow card) 15'; Soares (yellow card) 32'; Belevonis (yellow card) 35'; Solís 69' (pen.)	Stadium: Nikos Goumas Stadium; Attendance: 4,384; Referee: Giannis Bisogiannis (Thessaloniki)

9 March 2003 22	Olympiacos	1–2	AEK Athens	Rizoupoli
19:00 EET (UTC+2)	Antzas (yellow card) 42'; Giannakopoulos 70'		Kasapis (yellow card) 23'; Nikolaidis 33'; Borbokis (yellow card) 53'; Katsouranis (yellow card) 90+2', (goal) 90+4'; Wright (yellow card) 90+5'	Stadium: Rizoupoli Stadium; Attendance: 9,563; Referee: Makis Efthimiadis (Drama)

16 March 2003 23	AEK Athens	6–2	Akratitos	Nea Filadelfeia
16:45 EET (UTC+2)	Lakis 8'; Katsouranis 30'; Georgeas (yellow card) 56'; Ivić 58'; Nikolaidis 62', 73'; Nalitzis 87'		Ziakas 13', (yellow card) 27'; Barkoglou (yellow card) 32', (goal) 40'	Stadium: Nikos Goumas Stadium; Attendance: 5,873; Referee: Giannis Tsachilidis (Piraeus)

22 March 2003 24	PAOK	0–1	AEK Athens	Thessaloniki
18:00 EET (UTC+2)	Amponsah (yellow card) 58'; Engomitis (yellow card) 59'		Borbokis (yellow card) 60'; Kasapis (yellow card) 65'; Nalitzis 90+1'	Stadium: Toumba Stadium; Attendance: 11,340; Referee: Iraklis Tsikinis (Messinia)

5 April 2003 25	AEK Athens	4–1	Proodeftiki	Nea Filadelfeia
20:00 EEST (UTC+3)	Kasapis (red card) 7'; Borbokis (yellow card) 26', (goal) 67'; Moras 49' (o.g.); Tsiartas 74'; Ivić 90+2'		Mangos 8' (pen.); Pantos (yellow card) 10'	Stadium: Nikos Goumas Stadium; Attendance: 3,010; Referee: Makis Efthimiadis (Drama)

13 April 2003 26	AEK Athens	6–1	Iraklis	Nea Filadelfeia
20:00 EEST (UTC+3)	Tsiartas 4'; Ivić 5'; Kapsis (yellow card) 38'; Katsabis 51' (o.g.); Lakis 81'; Georgatos 89'; Nalitzis 90+3'		Kelpekis (yellow card) 30'; Milojević (yellow card) 73'; Kapetanos 84'	Stadium: Nikos Goumas Stadium; Attendance: 5,306; Referee: Giannis Spyropoulos (Phthiotis)

20 April 2003 27	Ionikos	0–3	AEK Athens	Nikaia
17:30 EEST (UTC+3)	Daraklitsas (yellow card) 52'		Lakis 26', (yellow card) 56'; Georgatos (yellow card) 36'; Tsiartas 54' (pen.); Katsouranis (yellow card) 65'; Wright (yellow card) 77'; Centeno 90+2'	Stadium: Neapoli Municipal Stadium; Attendance: 2,562; Referee: Giorgos Tsangarakis (Chania)

3 May 2003 28	AEK Athens	4–0	Aris	Nea Filadelfeia
19:00 EEST (UTC+3)	Tsiartas (yellow card) 11'; Katsouranis 13'; Lakis 30', 45'; Zagorakis (yellow card) 41'; Ivić 77'; Kasapis (yellow card) 90+3'		Koltsidas (yellow card) 10'; Demba (yellow card) 14'; Morris (yellow card) 46' (yellow-red card) 63'	Stadium: Nikos Goumas Stadium; Attendance: 6,883; Referee: Vasilis Terovitsas (Aetoloacarnania)
Note: Last match played in the Nikos Goumas Stadium.

11 May 2003 29	Panachaiki	0–2	AEK Athens	Patras
17:15 EEST (UTC+3)	Moustakis (yellow card) 45'		Georgatos (yellow card) 31'; Katsouranis 60'; Nalitzis 90'	Stadium: Kostas Davourlis Stadium; Attendance: 1,894; Referee: Avraam Kebaridis (Thessaloniki)

25 May 2003 30	AEK Athens	4–2	Panionios	Patras
18:30 EEST (UTC+3)	Wright (yellow card) 17'; Lakis 31'; Tsiartas 35'; Nalitzis 38'; Georgeas (yellow card) 75'; Maladenis 77'		Bellaj 3', 13', (yellow card) 38'; Kontis (yellow card) 10'; Raguel (yellow card) 20'; Giannakopoulos (yellow card) 39'; Ioannou (yellow card) 57'; Lagonikakis (yellow card) 85'	Stadium: Kostas Davourlis Stadium; Attendance: 1,686; Referee: Vasilis Terovitsas (Aetoloacarnania)

=== Greek Cup ===
==== First round ====
8 August 2002 First leg	Kassandra	0–2	AEK Athens	Kassandreia
19:00 EEST (UTC+3)	Kapagiannidis (yellow card) 38'; Dagounakis (yellow card) 51'	Report (page 5)	Nikolaidis 57'; Zagorakis 90+1'	Stadium: Municipal Stadium of Kassandreia; Attendance: 500; Referee: Avraam Kebaridis (Thessaloniki)

11 September 2002 Second leg	AEK Athens	0–0 (2–0 agg.)	Kassandra	Nea Filadelfeia
17:00 EEST (UTC+3)	Kostenoglou (yellow card) 37'; Maistrellis (yellow card) 51'	Report (page 11)		Stadium: Nikos Goumas Stadium; Attendance: 69; Referee: Giannis Kaminaris (Thessaly)

==== Second round ====
7 October 2002 First leg	AEK Athens	3–1	Chalkidona	Nea Filadelfeia
20:00 EEST (UTC+3)	Maladenis 38'; Georgeas (yellow card) 43'; Konstantinidis 59'; Ivić 60'	Report (page 13)	Dimos (yellow card) 51'; Kogioglou 65'	Stadium: Nikos Goumas Stadium; Attendance: 461; Referee: Christos Trikalis (Trikala)

6 November 2002 Second leg	Chalkidona	0–3 (6–1 agg.)	AEK Athens	Nikaia
19:00 EET (UTC+2)	Kobayashi (yellow card)	Report (page 15)	Kreek (yellow card); Nalitzis 11'; Wright 33'; Konstantinidis 42'	Stadium: Neapoli Municipal Stadium; Attendance: 1,000; Referee: Giannis Spyropoulos (Phthiotis)

==== Round of 16 ====
19 December 2002 First leg	AEK Athens	2–0	Apollon Athens	Nea Filadelfeia
19:00 EET (UTC+2)	Nalitzis 36'; Centeno 43'	Report (page 17)	Vourexakis (yellow card)	Stadium: Nikos Goumas Stadium; Attendance: 134; Referee: Kostas Finokaliotis (Athens)

29 January 2003 Second leg	Apollon Athens	0–3 (0–5 agg.)	AEK Athens	Agios Dimitrios
19:00 EET (UTC+2)	Vourexakis (yellow card) 81'	Report (page 19)	Solakis 70', 89', (penalty missed) 83'; Petkov 88'	Stadium: Agios Dimitrios Municipal Stadium; Attendance: 524; Referee: Vasilis Skoufitsas (Athens)

==== Quarter-finals ====
5 February 2003 First leg	Panionios	1–1	AEK Athens	Nea Smyrni
17:00 EET (UTC+2)	Mantzios (yellow card) 16'; Giannopoulos (yellow card) 58'; Raguel (yellow card) 62'; Mantzios 88'	Report (page 21)	Wright (yellow card) 9'; Nalitzis (yellow card) 37'; Maladenis 40'; Kreek (yellow card) 54'; Georgeas (yellow card) 69'	Stadium: Nea Smyrni Stadium; Attendance: 1,506; Referee: Kyros Vassaras (Thessaloniki)

5 March 2003 Second leg	AEK Athens	4–2 (5–3 agg.)	Panionios	Nea Filadelfeia
19:30 EET (UTC+2)	Nikolaidis (yellow card); Katsouranis 26', (yellow card); Nalitzis 37', 75'; Konstantinidis 43'	Report (page 21)	Bellaj (yellow card); Lagonikakis (yellow card); Raguel (yellow card); Šiljak 3'; Bulut 8'	Stadium: Nikos Goumas Stadium; Attendance: 2,473; Referee: Nikos Angelakis (Thessaloniki)

==== Semi-finals ====
23 April 2003 First leg	AEK Athens	0–1	PAOK	Nea Filadelfeia
19:45 EEST (UTC+3)		Report (page 23)	Koutsis (yellow card) 35'; Yiasoumi 40'; Amponsah (yellow card) 60'	Stadium: Nikos Goumas Stadium; Attendance: 10,082; Referee: Giorgos Borovilos (Arcadia)

7 May 2003 Second leg	PAOK	1–1 (2–1 agg.)	AEK Athens	Thessaloniki
20:00 EEST (UTC+3)	Okkas 88'	Report (page 23)	Katsouranis (yellow card); Georgatos (yellow card); Georgeas (yellow card); Chiotis (yellow card); Maladenis 8'	Stadium: Toumba Stadium; Attendance: 8,363; Referee: Thanasis Briakos (Epirus)

=== UEFA Champions League ===
==== Third qualifying round ====
The draw for the third qualifying round was held on 26 July 2002.

13 August 2002 First leg	APOEL (Cyprus)	2–3	(Greece) AEK Athens	Nicosia, Cyprus
20:30 EEST (UTC+3)	Okkarides (yellow card) 13'; Ouzounidis 23', (yellow card) 43'; Elia (yellow card) 36'; Malekkos 90' (pen.)	Report	Zagorakis (yellow card) 20'; Borbokis 44', 47'; Katsouranis (yellow card) 75'; Wright (yellow card) 90+3'; Nikolaidis 90+3'	Stadium: GSP Stadium; Attendance: 16,192; Referee: Éric Poulat (France)

28 August 2002 Second leg	AEK Athens (Greece)	1–0 (4–2 agg.)	(Cyprus) APOEL	Athens, Greece
21:15 EEST (UTC+3)	Wright 58'	Report		Stadium: Nikos Goumas Stadium; Attendance: 9,204; Referee: Claus Bo Larsen (Denmark)

==== First group stage ====
The draw for the group stage was held on 29 August 2002.

Pos	Team	Pld	W	D	L	GF	GA	GD	Pts	Qualification	RMA	ROM	AEK	GNK
1	(Spain) Real Madrid	6	2	3	1	15	7	+8	9	Advance to second group stage	—	0–1	2–2	6–0
2	(Italy) Roma	6	2	3	1	3	4	−1	9	Advance to second group stage	0–3	—	1–1	0–0
3	(Greece) AEK Athens	6	0	6	0	7	7	0	6	Transfer to UEFA Cup	3–3	0–0	—	1–1
4	(Belgium) Genk	6	0	4	2	2	9	−7	4		1–1	0–1	0–0	—

Source: RSSSF

===== Matches =====
17 September 2002 1	Genk (Belgium)	0–0	(Greece) AEK Athens	Genk, Belgium
21:45 EEST (UTC+3)	Thijs (yellow card) 74'	Report	Kasapis (yellow card) 20'; Kostenoglou (yellow card) 61'	Stadium: Cristal Arena; Attendance: 13,500; Referee: Konrad Plautz (Austria)

25 September 2002 2	AEK Athens (Greece)	0–0	(Italy) Roma	Athens, Greece
21:45 EEST (UTC+3)	Kostenoglou (yellow card) 53'; Lakis (yellow card) 71'	Report	Panucci (yellow card) 25'	Stadium: Nikos Goumas Stadium; Attendance: 9,444; Referee: Graham Barber (England)

2 October 2002 3	AEK Athens (Greece)	3–3	(Spain) Real Madrid	Athens, Greece
21:45 EEST (UTC+3)	Tsiartas (yellow card) 6', (goal) 6'; Maladenis 25'; Nikolaidis 28'; Zagorakis (yellow card) 58'	Report	Zidane 15', 39'; Guti 60'; Makélélé (yellow card) 64'	Stadium: Nikos Goumas Stadium; Attendance: 12,784; Referee: Valentin Ivanov (Russia)

22 October 2002 4	Real Madrid (Spain)	2–2	(Greece) AEK Athens	Madrid, Spain
21:45 EEST (UTC+3)	McManaman 24', 43'; Roberto Carlos (yellow card) 54'	Report	Georgatos (yellow card) 66'; Katsouranis 74'; Centeno 86'; Zagorakis (yellow card) 90+1'	Stadium: Santiago Bernabéu; Attendance: 58,343; Referee: Herbert Fandel (Germany)

30 October 2002 5	AEK Athens (Greece)	1–1	(Belgium) Genk	Athens, Greece
21:45 EET (UTC+2)	Lakis 30'	Report	Sonck 22'; Daerden (yellow card) 77'	Stadium: Nikos Goumas Stadium; Attendance: 19,775; Referee: Massimo Busacca (Switzerland)

12 November 2002 6	Roma (Italy)	1–1	(Greece) AEK Athens	Rome, Italy
21:45 EET (UTC+2)	Delvecchio 40', (yellow card) 49'	Report	Zagorakis (yellow card) 62'; Centeno 90'	Stadium: Stadio Olimpico; Attendance: 32,734; Referee: Stéphane Bré (France)

=== UEFA Cup ===
==== Round of 32 ====
The draw for the round of 32 was held on 15 November 2002.

28 November 2002 First Leg	AEK Athens (Greece)	4–0	(Israel) Maccabi Haifa	Athens, Greece
21:15 EET (UTC+2)	Georgatos 13'; Nikolaidis 23'; Petkov 30'; Zagorakis 35'; Chiotis (yellow card) 90'	Report	Yakubu (penalty missed) 12'; Benado (yellow card) 80'	Stadium: Nikos Goumas Stadium; Attendance: 8,695; Referee: Paulo Costa (Portugal)

12 December 2002 Second Leg	Maccabi Haifa (Israel)	1–4 (1–8 agg.)	(Greece) AEK Athens	Nicosia, Cyprus
21:30 EET (UTC+2)	Badir 5' (pen.); Jano (yellow card) 11'; Pralija (yellow card) 70'	Report	Georgatos (yellow card) 21'; Katsouranis 56'; Lakis 80', 90'; Nalitzis 90+3'	Stadium: GSP Stadium; Attendance: 1,615; Referee: Knud Erik Fisker (Denmark)

==== Round of 16 ====
The draw for the round of 16 was held on 13 December 2002.

20 February 2003 First Leg	Málaga (Spain)	0–0	(Greece) AEK Athens	Málaga, Spain
22:30 EET (UTC+2)	Kreek (yellow card) 18'	Report	Silva (yellow card) 79'	Stadium: La Rosaleda Stadium; Attendance: 9,720; Referee: Željko Širić (Croatia)

27 February 2003 Second Leg	AEK Athens (Greece)	0–1 (0–1 agg.)	(Spain) Málaga	Athens, Greece
20:00 EET (UTC+2)	Zagorakis (yellow card) 44'	Report	Sanz (yellow card) 13'; Sánchez 26'; Ángel (yellow card) 87'	Stadium: Nikos Goumas Stadium; Attendance: 16,050; Referee: Rob Styles (England)

== Statistics ==
=== Squad statistics ===
As of 25 May 2003

No.	Pos	Player	Alpha Ethniki		Greek Cup		Champions League		UEFA Cup		Total	
No.	Pos	Player	Apps	Goals	Apps	Goals	Apps	Goals	Apps	Goals	Apps	Goals
Goalkeepers
12	GK	(Greece) Sotiris Liberopoulos	0	0	0	0	0	0	0	0	0	0
22	GK	(Greece) Dionysis Chiotis	28	0	6	0	8	0	4	0	46	0
33	GK	(Greece) Chrysostomos Michailidis	3	0	3	0	0	0	0	0	6	0
—	GK	(Greece) Giannis Arabatzis	0	0	0	0	0	0	0	0	0	0
Defenders
2	DF	(Greece) Vasilios Borbokis	23	3	4	0	4	2	2	0	33	5
5	DF	(Greece) Nikos Kostenoglou	15	0	6	0	7	0	4	0	32	0
8	DF	(Netherlands) Michel Kreek	11	0	6	0	1	0	2	0	20	0
16	DF	(Greece) Nikolaos Georgeas	16	0	8	0	1	0	1	0	26	0
17	DF	(Greece) Michalis Kasapis	21	0	6	0	7	0	3	0	37	0
19	DF	(Costa Rica) Mauricio Wright	25	0	7	1	8	1	4	0	44	2
25	DF	(Greece) Stelios Maistrellis	1	0	4	0	0	0	0	0	5	0
31	DF	(Greece) Grigoris Georgatos	23	2	7	0	5	0	3	1	38	3
32	DF	(Greece) Michalis Kapsis	20	0	3	0	7	0	1	0	31	0
40	DF	(Greece) Grigoris Toskas	0	0	1	0	0	0	0	0	1	0
81	DF	(Canada) Stathis Kappos	0	0	3	0	0	0	0	0	3	0
Midfielders
6	MF	(Greece) Theodoros Zagorakis	25	0	7	1	7	0	4	1	43	2
7	MF	(Greece) Christos Maladenis	18	4	5	3	5	1	3	0	31	8
10	MF	(Greece) Vasilios Tsiartas	21	11	5	0	8	1	2	0	36	12
13	MF	(Greece) Giorgos Passios	0	0	1	0	0	0	0	0	1	0
14	MF	(Bulgaria) Ivan Rusev	2	0	1	0	0	0	0	0	3	0
18	MF	(Costa Rica) Walter Centeno	14	1	6	1	5	2	2	0	27	4
21	MF	(Greece) Kostas Katsouranis	26	6	8	1	8	1	2	1	44	9
23	MF	(Greece) Vasilios Lakis	27	12	4	0	8	1	4	2	43	15
28	MF	(Bulgaria) Milen Petkov	19	0	7	1	4	0	3	1	33	2
34	MF	(Greece) Nikos Pourtoulidis	0	0	1	0	0	0	0	0	1	0
—	MF	(Greece) Dimitris Karameris	0	0	0	0	0	0	0	0	0	0
Forwards
9	FW	(Greece) Ilias Solakis	2	0	2	2	0	0	0	0	4	2
11	FW	(Greece) Demis Nikolaidis	22	12	2	1	8	2	4	1	36	16
15	FW	(Argentina) Livio Prieto	0	0	5	0	0	0	0	0	5	0
20	FW	(Greece) Sotiris Konstantinidis	18	2	8	3	1	0	2	0	29	5
24	FW	(Greece) Christos Kostis	0	0	2	0	0	0	0	0	2	0
30	FW	(Serbia and Montenegro) Ilija Ivić	20	9	5	1	6	0	3	0	34	10
37	FW	(Greece) Dimitris Nalitzis	19	10	6	4	3	0	3	1	31	15
Left during Winter Transfer Window
1	GK	(Greece) Ilias Atmatsidis	0	0	2	0	0	0	0	0	2	0

=== Goalscorers ===
As of 25 May 2003
The list is sorted by competition order when total goals are equal, then by position and then by squad number.

Rank	No.	Pos.	Player	Alpha Ethniki	Greek Cup	Champions League	UEFA Cup	Total
1	11	FW	(Greece) Demis Nikolaidis	12	1	2	1	16
2	23	MF	(Greece) Vasilios Lakis	12	0	1	2	15
2	88	FW	(Greece) Dimitris Nalitzis	10	4	0	1	15
4	10	MF	(Greece) Vasilios Tsiartas	11	0	1	0	12
5	30	FW	(Serbia and Montenegro) Ilija Ivić	9	1	0	0	10
6	21	MF	(Greece) Kostas Katsouranis	6	1	1	1	9
7	7	MF	(Greece) Christos Maladenis	4	3	1	0	8
8	2	DF	(Greece) Vasilios Borbokis	3	0	2	0	5
8	20	FW	(Greece) Sotiris Konstantinidis	2	3	0	0	5
10	18	MF	(Costa Rica) Walter Centeno	1	1	2	0	4
11	31	DF	(Greece) Grigoris Georgatos	2	0	0	1	3
12	9	FW	(Greece) Ilias Solakis	0	2	0	0	2
12	18	DF	(Costa Rica) Mauricio Wright	0	1	1	0	2
12	6	MF	(Greece) Theodoros Zagorakis	0	1	0	1	2
12	28	MF	(Bulgaria) Milen Petkov	0	1	0	1	2
Own goals				2	0	0	0	2
Totals				74	19	11	8	112

=== Hat-tricks ===
Numbers in superscript represent the goals that the player scored.

Player	Against	Result	Date	Competition	Source
(Greece) Vasilios Lakis	(Greece) Panachaiki	6–0 (H)	12 January 2003	Alpha Ethniki	
(Greece) Dimitris Nalitzis	(Greece) Egaleo	3–2 (H)	26 January 2003	Alpha Ethniki	
(Greece) Vasilios Tsiartas	(Greece) Kallithea	3–1 (A)	23 February 2003	Alpha Ethniki	

=== Assists ===
As of 25 May 2003
The list is sorted by competition order when total assists are equal, then by position and then by squad number.

Rank	No.	Pos.	Player	Alpha Ethniki	Greek Cup	Champions League	UEFA Cup	Total
1	31	DF	(Greece) Grigoris Georgatos	14	1	1	2	18
2	10	MF	(Greece) Vasilios Tsiartas	6	2	4	0	12
3	2	DF	(Greece) Vasilios Borbokis	5	2	0	0	7
3	11	FW	(Greece) Demis Nikolaidis	4	2	0	1	7
5	23	MF	(Greece) Vasilios Lakis	4	0	0	2	6
6	30	FW	(Serbia and Montenegro) Ilija Ivić	4	0	1	0	5
7	6	MF	(Greece) Theodoros Zagorakis	3	0	0	0	3
7	7	MF	(Greece) Christos Maladenis	3	0	0	0	3
7	20	FW	(Greece) Sotiris Konstantinidis	2	1	0	0	3
7	21	MF	(Greece) Kostas Katsouranis	2	0	1	0	3
7	18	MF	(Costa Rica) Walter Centeno	0	1	1	1	3
12	88	FW	(Greece) Dimitris Nalitzis	1	1	0	0	2
12	28	MF	(Bulgaria) Milen Petkov	1	0	0	1	2
14	18	DF	(Costa Rica) Mauricio Wright	1	0	0	0	1
14	16	DF	(Greece) Nikolaos Georgeas	1	0	0	0	1
14	17	DF	(Greece) Michalis Kasapis	0	1	0	0	1
14	15	FW	(Argentina) Livio Prieto	0	1	0	0	1
Totals				51	12	8	7	78

=== Clean sheets ===
As of 25 May 2003
The list is sorted by competition order when total clean sheets are equal, then by squad number. Clean sheets in games where both goalkeepers participated are awarded to the goalkeeper who started the game. Goalkeepers with no appearances are not included.

Rank	No.	Player	Alpha Ethniki	Greek Cup	Champions League	UEFA Cup	Total
1	22	(Greece) Dionysis Chiotis	11	1	3	2	18
2	33	(Greece) Chrysostomos Michailidis	0	2	0	0	3
3	1	(Greece) Ilias Atmatsidis	0	2	0	0	2
Totals			11	5	3	2	22

=== Disciplinary record ===
As of 25 May 2003

N	P	Nat.	Name	Alpha Ethniki			Greek Cup			Champions League			UEFA Cup			Total			Notes
N	P	Nat.	Name	Yellow card	Second yellow card	Red card	Yellow card	Second yellow card	Red card	Yellow card	Second yellow card	Red card	Yellow card	Second yellow card	Red card	Yellow card	Second yellow card	Red card	Notes
Goalkeepers
12	GK	(Greece)	Sotiris Liberopoulos																
22	GK	(Greece)	Dionysis Chiotis	2			1						1			4			
33	GK	(Greece)	Chrysostomos Michailidis	2												2			
—	GK	(Greece)	Giannis Arabatzis																
Defenders
2	DF	(Greece)	Vasilios Borbokis	5												5			
5	DF	(Greece)	Nikos Kostenoglou	1						2						3			
8	DF	(Netherlands)	Michel Kreek	1			2						1			4			
16	DF	(Greece)	Nikolaos Georgeas	6			3									9			
17	DF	(Greece)	Michalis Kasapis	5		1				1						6		1	
19	DF	(Costa Rica)	Mauricio Wright	8			1			1						10			
25	DF	(Greece)	Stelios Maistrellis				1									1			
31	DF	(Greece)	Grigoris Georgatos	5			1			1			1			8			
32	DF	(Greece)	Michalis Kapsis	2	1											2	1		
40	DF	(Greece)	Grigoris Toskas																
81	DF	(Canada)	Stathis Kappos																
Midfielders
6	MF	(Greece)	Theodoros Zagorakis	7						4			1			12			
7	MF	(Greece)	Christos Maladenis	2												2			
10	MF	(Greece)	Vasilios Tsiartas	2						1						3			
13	MF	(Greece)	Giorgos Passios																
14	MF	(Bulgaria)	Ivan Rusev																
18	MF	(Costa Rica)	Walter Centeno	3												3			
21	MF	(Greece)	Kostas Katsouranis	5			2			1						8			
23	MF	(Greece)	Vasilios Lakis	5						1						6			
28	MF	(Bulgaria)	Milen Petkov	2												2			
34	MF	(Greece)	Nikos Pourtoulidis																
—	MF	(Greece)	Dimitris Karameris																
Forwards
9	DF	(Greece)	Ilias Solakis																
11	FW	(Greece)	Demis Nikolaidis	2			1									3			
15	FW	(Argentina)	Livio Prieto																
20	FW	(Greece)	Sotiris Konstantinidis																
24	FW	(Greece)	Christos Kostis																
30	FW	(Serbia and Montenegro)	Ilija Ivić	2												2			
37	FW	(Greece)	Dimitris Nalitzis			1	1									1		1	
Left during Winter Transfer window
1	GK	(Greece)	Ilias Atmatsidis				1									1			

=== Starting 11 ===
This section presents the most frequently used formation along with the players with the most starts across all competitions.

N.	Formation	Matchday(s)
43	4–2–3–1	1–30
9	4–4–2
2	5–4–1

No.	Nat.	Player	Pos.
22	(Greece)	Dionysis Chiotis	GK
19	(Costa Rica)	Mauricio Wright	RCB
32	(Greece)	Michalis Kapsis	LCB
2	(Greece)	Vasilios Borbokis	RB
17	(Greece)	Michalis Kasapis (C)	LB
6	(Greece)	Theodoros Zagorakis	DM
21	(Greece)	Kostas Katsouranis	CM
23	(Greece)	Vasilios Lakis	RM
31	(Greece)	Grigoris Georgatos	LM
10	(Greece)	Vasilios Tsiartas	AM
11	(Greece)	Demis Nikolaidis	CF

Last updated: 2003-05-25

== Awards ==
Player	Pos.	Award	Source
(Bosnia and Herzegovina) Dušan Bajević	—	Manager of the Season	
