= List of first black players for European national football teams =

The following is a list of the first black or mixed-race players to represent European international association football teams. The first black man to play international football was Andrew Watson, who earned the first of his three caps for Scotland on 12 March 1881, when he captained them in a 6–1 win away to England at The Oval in London.

Team	Player	Debut	Against	Notes
Scotland	Andrew Watson	12 March 1881	England	Born in Demerara, British Guiana (now Guyana) to an Afro-Guyanese mother and Scottish father. No black players represented Scotland since Watson until the debut of Nigel Quashie on 27 May 2004. Quashie was born in London to a Ghanaian father and English mother, and qualified for Scotland through a grandfather.
Austria	Helmut Köglberger	5 September 1965	Hungary	Born in Steyr, Austria to an African-American father and Austrian mother.
Belgium	Dimitri Mbuyu	4 February 1987	Portugal	Born in Berchem, Belgium, of Congolese origin.
Faroe Islands	Sonni Nattestad	19 November 2013	Malta	Born in Tórshavn, Faroe Islands, of Afro-Haitian origin.
France	Raoul Diagne	15 February 1931	Czechoslovakia	Diagne was born to Senegalese parents in Saint-Laurent-du-Maroni, French Guiana.
Wales	Eddie Parris	5 December 1931	Northern Ireland	Parris, born to a black Barbadian father and white English mother in Pwllmeyric near Chepstow, played one match for Wales.
Germany	Erwin Kostedde	22 December 1974	Malta	Born in Münster to an African-American father and German mother.
Greece	Daniel Batista Lima	12 October 1994	Finland	Born in São Vicente, Cape Verde, a naturalised Greek citizen.
England	Viv Anderson	29 November 1978	Czechoslovakia	The first black player to represent England at any level was John Charles, who played for the England under 18's in 1962 and scored against Israel. Paul Ince was the nation's first black captain, against the United States in June 1993.
Republic of Ireland	Chris Hughton	29 October 1979	United States	Hughton was born in London to a Ghanaian father and Irish mother.
Spain	Donato Gama da Silva	16 November 1994	Denmark	Born in Rio de Janeiro, Brazil, and a naturalised Spanish citizen. The first Spanish-born black player in the team was Vicente Engonga, born in Barcelona to an Equatoguinean father, who debuted against Russia on 23 September 1998.
Netherlands	Humphrey Mijnals	3 April 1960	Bulgaria	Born in Paramaribo, Surinam, then a Dutch plantation colony, played three matches for the Netherlands and 45 matches for Suriname.
Norway	John Carew	18 November 1998	Egypt	Born in Akershus, to Gambian father and Norwegian mother.
Poland	Emmanuel Olisadebe	16 August 2000	Romania	Born in Warri, Nigeria, a naturalised Polish citizen.
Portugal	Guilherme Espírito Santo	28 November 1937	Spain	Born in Lisbon, Portugal, of São Toméan descent.
Italy	Miguel Montuori	15 February 1956	France	Born in Argentina to an Italian father and an Afro-Argentinian mother.
Bulgaria	Tiago Silva	17 August 2005	Turkey	Born in Taquari, Brazil, a naturalized Bulgarian citizen who had been previously capped for the Brazilian Youth Team.
Czech Republic	Theodor Gebre Selassie	4 June 2011	Peru	Born in Třebíč to an Ethiopian father and Czech mother.
Switzerland	Raymond Bardel	15 April 1951	West Germany	Born in Yverdon-les-Bains, Switzerland, the son of a black American father and a Swiss mother.
Iceland	Anthony Karl Gregory	8 August 1990	Faroe Islands	
Croatia	Eduardo da Silva	16 November 2004	Republic of Ireland	Born in Rio de Janeiro to a white Brazilian father and Afro-Brazilian mother, he was naturalised as a Croatian citizen.
Slovakia	Karim Guédé	10 August 2011	Austria	Born in Hamburg to a Togolese mother and French father, he was naturalised as a Slovak citizen.
Sweden	Jean-Paul Vonderburg	14 February 1990	United Arab Emirates	Swedish born. Martin Dahlin appeared for Sweden's Olympic team in 1988.
Ukraine	Edmar Halovskyi de Lacerda	10 August 2011	Sweden	Born in Mogi das Cruzes, Brazil, he was naturalised as a Ukrainian citizen.
Northern Ireland	Jeff Whitley	11 February 1997	Belgium	Born in Lusaka, Zambia to a Northern Irish father and Zambian mother.
Denmark	Carsten Dethlefsen	9 March 1994	England	Born in Hamburg, Germany but moved to Denmark at the age of 1.
Turkey	Vahap Özaltay	14 October 1927	Bulgaria	Born in Beirut, Lebanon to Afro-Turk parents.
Hungary	Thomas Sowunmi	18 August 1999	Moldova	Born in Lagos, Nigeria to a Nigerian father and Hungarian mother.
Israel	Baruch Dego	12 February 2003	Armenia	Born in Addis Ababa, Ethiopia, to an Ethiopian-Jewish family, and immigrated with them to Israel at a young age. Rifaat Turk, very popular player in the 1970s and 1980s, is an Israeli Arab and black in appearance. He later served as deputy mayor of Tel Aviv.
Finland	Nikolai Alho	24 January 2014	Oman	Born in Helsinki, Alho also has British citizenship.
Cyprus	Dossa Júnior	15 August 2012	Bulgaria	Born in Lisbon, Portugal, of Mozambican descent, Júnior was naturalised as a Cypriot citizen.
Azerbaijan	Ernani Pereira	7 October 2006	Portugal	Born in Belo Horizonte, Brazil, Pereira was naturalised as an Azeri citizen.
North Macedonia	Aguinaldo Braga	17 April 2002	Finland	Born in Moeda, Brazil, was naturalised as a Macedonian citizen.
Armenia	Balep Ba Ndoumbouk	18 February 2004	Hungary	Born in Cameroon, Ba Ndoumbouk was naturalised as an Armenian citizen.
Luxembourg	Eugène Afrika	10 October 1998	Poland	
Malta	Chucks Nwoko	10 February 1998	Georgia	Born in Lagos, Nigeria, Nwoko was naturalised as a Maltese citizen.
Russia	Ari	15 November 2018	Germany	Born in Fortaleza, Brazil, Ari was naturalised as a Russian citizen.
Belarus	Max Ebong	9 September 2019	Wales	Born in Vitebsk to a Cameroonian father and Belarusian mother.
Liechtenstein	Justin Ospelt	7 October 2020	Luxembourg	Born in Nassau, Bahamas to a Liechtensteiner father and an Afro-Bahamian mother.
Bosnia and Herzegovina	Ricardo Santos Lago	9 October 2004	Serbia	Born in Ilhéus, Brazil, was naturalised as a Bosnian citizen.

== See also ==
- List of first black Major League Baseball players by team
