= Tom Alston =

American baseball player (1926–1993)

- First baseman
- Born: January 31, 1926; Greensboro, North Carolina, U.S.
- Died: December 30, 1993 (aged 67); Winston-Salem, North Carolina, U.S.
- Batted: Left Threw: Right

MLB debut
- April 13, 1954, for the St. Louis Cardinals

Last MLB appearance
- September 29, 1957, for the St. Louis Cardinals

MLB statistics
- Batting average: .244
- Home runs: 4
- Runs batted in: 36
- Stats at Baseball Reference

Teams
- St. Louis Cardinals (1954–1957)

Thomas Edison Alston (January 31, 1926 – December 30, 1993) was an American Major League Baseball first baseman who played for the St. Louis Cardinals from 1954 to 1957, the first African-American to do so. A native of Greensboro, North Carolina, he stood 6'5" (200 cm) and weighed 210 pounds (95 kg).

Alston was acquired by St. Louis via a trade with the San Diego Padres of the Pacific Coast League, where he played in 180 games in 1953, on January 26, 1954, after team president Gussie Busch told manager Eddie Stanky to find a black player. Not only did Busch think excluding blacks from baseball was morally wrong, his company Anheuser–Busch, which had bought the team a year earlier to keep them from moving to Milwaukee, sold more beer to African-Americans than any other brewery, leading him to fear the effect of a boycott.

However, Busch was somewhat disappointed by Alston. When he reported to the Cardinals, the team learned he was two years older than the Padres had claimed. Busch demanded they return $20,000 the Cardinals had included with the trade to account for two seasons that Busch believed the team could not get from Alston.

When he made his Major League debut (April 13, 1954, at Sportsman's Park), he became the first black player in St. Louis Cardinals history. He played in 66 games during his rookie season, batting .246 with 4 home runs and 34 runs batted in. After that, he got into 25 more games over the next three seasons. He spent most of his major league career splitting time between the majors and the Class AAA Omaha Cardinals, where he had a .306 batting average and 21 home runs in 1956.

Career totals for 91 games include a .244 batting average (66-for-271), 4 home runs, 36 RBI, 30 runs scored, and an on-base percentage of .311. In his 81 appearances at first base, he handled 680 out of 689 total chances successfully for a fielding percentage of .987, just slightly under the league average during his era.

Alston's career was handicapped by neurasthenia and other mental disorders which forced his hospitalization after his playing career was over.

== See also ==
- List of first black Major League Baseball players by team and date
