= List of first black Major League Baseball players =

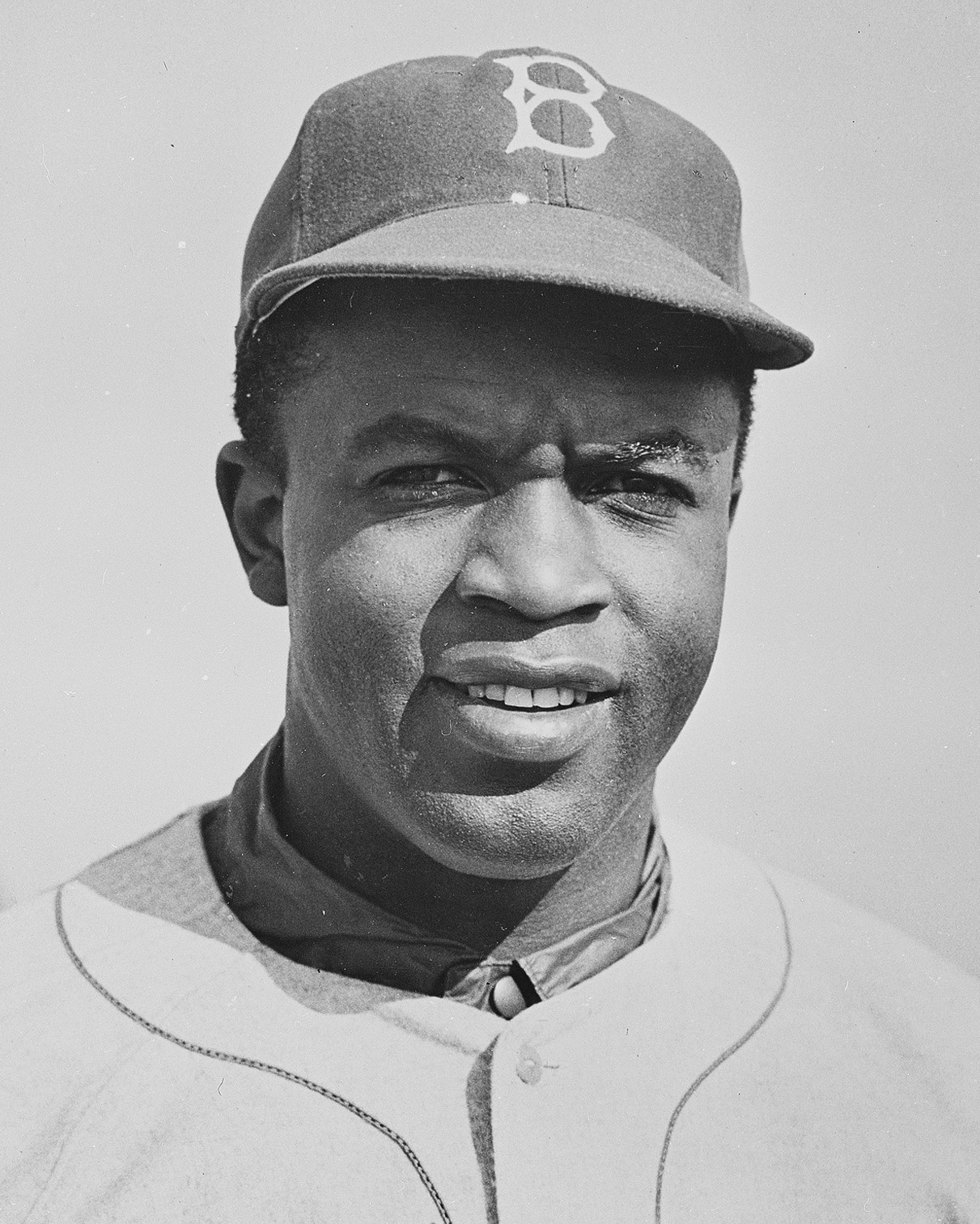
Jackie Robinson broke baseball's color line with the Brooklyn Dodgers on April 15, 1947.

The baseball color line excluded players of Black African descent from Major League Baseball and its affiliated Minor Leagues until 1947 (with a few notable exceptions in the 19th century before the line was firmly established).

Before 1885 at least three African-American men played in the major leagues: William Edward White, whose light skin color allowed him pass as white, played one game for the Providence Grays in 1879; Moses Fleetwood Walker, an openly Black man who played for the Toledo Blue Stockings of the American Association between May 1 and September 4, 1884; and his brother, Weldy Walker, who played five games with the Toledo club between July 15 and August 6, 1884. Baseball officials essentially drew the color line against Fleetwood Walker. African-Americans had been excluded from major league baseball since 1884 and from white professional minor league teams since 1889. Following the 1891 season, the Ansonia Cuban Giants, a team composed of African-American players, were expelled from the Connecticut State League, the last white minor league to have a Black team.

The Brooklyn Dodgers broke the 63-year color line when they started future Hall of Famer Jackie Robinson at first base on Opening Day, April 15, 1947. The Boston Red Sox were the last team to break the line, when they inserted Pumpsie Green as an eighth-inning pinch runner in a July 21, 1959 game at Chicago.

== Before 1885 ==
Player	Team	League	First game	Last game
William Edward White	Providence Grays	NL	June 21, 1879	June 21, 1879
Moses Fleetwood Walker	Toledo Blue Stockings	AA	May 1, 1884	September 4, 1884
Weldy Walker	Toledo Blue Stockings	AA	July 15, 1884	August 6, 1884

== After 1946 ==
Key
†	Elected to the Baseball Hall of Fame

=== Overall ===
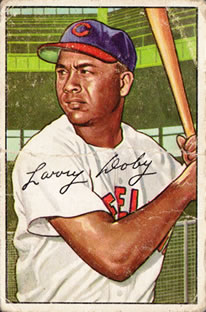
Larry Doby became the first black player in the American League on July 5, 1947.

Below is a list of the first 20 Black players in Major League Baseball since Moses Fleetwood Walker's last major league appearance.

Player	Team	League	Date
Jackie Robinson ^{†}	Brooklyn Dodgers	NL	April 15, 1947
Larry Doby ^{†}	Cleveland Indians	AL	July 5, 1947
Hank Thompson	St. Louis Browns	AL	July 17, 1947
Willard Brown ^{†}	St. Louis Browns	AL	July 19, 1947
Dan Bankhead	Brooklyn Dodgers	NL	August 26, 1947
Roy Campanella ^{†}	Brooklyn Dodgers	NL	April 20, 1948
Satchel Paige ^{†}	Cleveland Indians	AL	July 9, 1948
Minnie Miñoso ^{†}	Cleveland Indians	AL	April 19, 1949
Don Newcombe	Brooklyn Dodgers	NL	May 20, 1949
Monte Irvin ^{†}	New York Giants	NL	July 8, 1949
Luke Easter	Cleveland Indians	AL	August 11, 1949
Sam Jethroe	Boston Braves	NL	April 18, 1950
Luis Márquez	Boston Braves	NL	April 18, 1951
Ray Noble	New York Giants	NL	April 18, 1951
Artie Wilson	New York Giants	NL	April 18, 1951
Harry Simpson	Cleveland Indians	AL	April 21, 1951
Willie Mays ^{†}	New York Giants	NL	May 25, 1951
Sam Hairston	Chicago White Sox	AL	July 21, 1951
Bob Boyd	Chicago White Sox	AL	September 8, 1951
Sam Jones	Cleveland Indians	AL	September 22, 1951

- Note: Johnny Wright was the second Black player signed to a contract by the Dodgers, and was on the roster of the 1946 Montreal Royals at the same time as Jackie Robinson, but never played in the Major Leagues.

=== By team ===
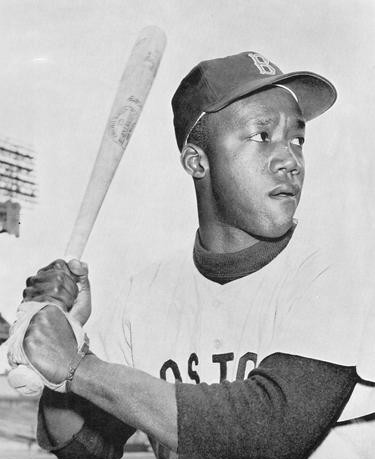
The Boston Red Sox became the last team to field a black player when Pumpsie Green entered a game on July 21, 1959.

- Teams are listed by franchise; i.e., teams that relocated to a new city after already breaking the color line are not listed a second time.
- Expansion teams that joined the National and American Leagues after 1961 have been integrated from their first game and are not listed.

Team	League	Date	Player
Brooklyn Dodgers	NL	April 15, 1947	Jackie Robinson ^{†}
Cleveland Indians	AL	July 5, 1947	Larry Doby ^{†}
St. Louis Browns	AL	July 17, 1947	Hank Thompson
New York Giants	NL	July 8, 1949^{‡}	Hank Thompson
New York Giants	NL	July 8, 1949^{‡}	Monte Irvin ^{†}
Boston Braves	NL	April 18, 1950	Sam Jethroe
Chicago White Sox	AL	May 1, 1951	Minnie Miñoso ^{†}
Philadelphia Athletics	AL	September 13, 1953	Bob Trice
Chicago Cubs	NL	September 17, 1953	Ernie Banks ^{†}
Pittsburgh Pirates	NL	April 13, 1954	Curt Roberts*
St. Louis Cardinals	NL	April 13, 1954	Tom Alston
Cincinnati Reds	NL	April 17, 1954	Nino Escalera
Cincinnati Reds	NL	April 17, 1954	Chuck Harmon
Washington Senators	AL	September 6, 1954	Carlos Paula
New York Yankees	AL	April 14, 1955	Elston Howard
Philadelphia Phillies	NL	April 22, 1957	John Kennedy
Detroit Tigers	AL	June 6, 1958	Ozzie Virgil Sr.
Boston Red Sox	AL	July 21, 1959	Pumpsie Green

* Major League Baseball recognizes Curt Roberts as the Pirates' first Black player; however, Carlos Bernier of Puerto Rico, also a Black man, debuted on April 22, 1953.
‡ Thompson and Irvin broke in with the Giants during the same game on July 8, 1949. Thompson was the starting third baseman, and Irvin pinch hit in the eighth.

=== By position ===
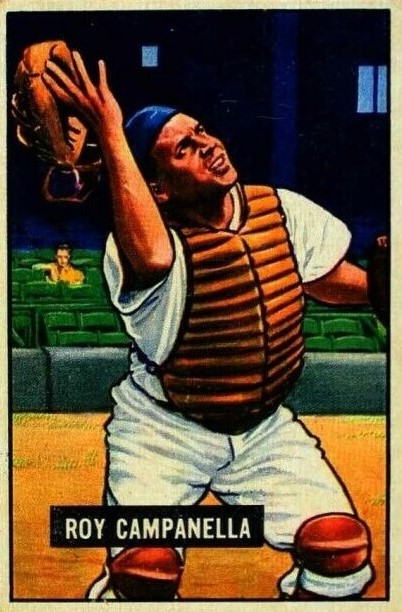
Roy Campanella became the first black catcher in the majors outside of the Negro leagues on April 20, 1948.

Position	Player	Team	Date
Pitcher	Dan Bankhead	Brooklyn Dodgers	August 26, 1947
Catcher	Roy Campanella ^{†}	Brooklyn Dodgers	April 20, 1948
First base	Jackie Robinson ^{†}	Brooklyn Dodgers	April 15, 1947
Second base	Hank Thompson	St. Louis Browns	July 17, 1947
Third base	Monte Irvin ^{†}	New York Giants	July 18, 1949
Shortstop	Larry Doby ^{†}	Cleveland Indians	July 17, 1947
Left field	Luis Márquez	Boston Braves	April 20, 1951
Center field	Willard Brown ^{†}	St. Louis Browns	July 19, 1947
Right field	Willard Brown ^{†}	St. Louis Browns	July 20, 1947

== See also ==
- History of baseball in the United States
  - Baseball color line § Professional baseball firsts
- Negro league baseball
  - List of Negro league baseball players
- List of first black players for European national football teams
- List of starting black NFL quarterbacks
