= Michel Kreek =

Dutch footballer (born 1971)

Personal information
- Date of birth: 16 January 1971 (age 55)
- Place of birth: Amsterdam, Netherlands
- Height: 1.84 m (6 ft 0 in)
- Positions: Defender; defensive midfielder

Team information
- Current team: Ajax (loan coach)

Youth career
- –1989: Ajax

Senior career*
Years	Team	Apps	(Gls)
1989–1994	Ajax	83	(5)
1994–1996	Padova	53	(10)
1996–1997	Perugia	32	(3)
1997–2002	Vitesse	130	(18)
2002–2004	AEK Athens	29	(0)
2004–2006	Willem II	23	(0)
Total		350	(36)

International career
1995	Netherlands	1	(0)

Managerial career
- 2006–2013: Ajax (academy)
- 2013–2016: Almere City (U19)
- 2015–2016: Netherlands U19 (assistant)
- 2016: Inter Milan (assistant)
- 2017–2019: Netherlands (women's assistant)
- 2018–2019: Netherlands (women's U20)
- 2019–2021: Ajax (youth coordinator)
- 2021–2023: Jong Ajax (assistant)
- * Club domestic league appearances and goals

Michel Kreek (born 16 January 1971) is a Dutch former professional footballer who played as a defender. He also made one international appearance for the Netherlands.

He was part of Frank de Boer's backroom staff at Inter Milan. He currently serves as the loan coach for Ajax, responsible for monitoring and accompanying players serving loan spells with other clubs.

== Club career ==
=== Ajax ===
Kreek started his football career at the amateur club, De Eland SDC in the Nieuw-West area west of Amsterdam. There he was scouted by Ajax and soon joined the club’s academies amidst a multitude of young players, such as Dennis Bergkamp, Frank de Boer and Ronald de Boer. During that period he played mainly as a defensive midfielder, a position in which he established himself when he moved to the first team in the summer of 1989.

He played for Ajax for five years, completing 83 appearances and scoring 5 goals. Kreek played as a starter in both legs of the finals against Torino for the UEFA Cup, where Ajax won on 13 May 1992. His playing time was significantly reduced after the establishment of Edgar Davids in the midfield. During this time, he won two Championships, a Cup, one Dutch Super Cup and one UEFA Cup.

=== Serie A ===
In the summer of 1994 Kreek left Ajax and moved to Italy to sign for Padova. Kreek played as a starter throughout the season, but in 1996 Padova suffered the relegation from Serie A. In the following season he moved to newly-promoted Perugia. During the season Perugia failed to stay in Serie A, as well and Kreek left the club at the end of the season.

=== Vitesse ===
In the summer of 1997 he returned to the Netherlands and was transferred to Vitesse. He played at the club of Arnhem for five seasons, completing 130 appearances and scoring 18 goals. During his spell at Vitesse Kreek was relocated as a defender, due to his advanced age.

=== AEK Athens ===
On 28 June 2002, Kreek was transferred to the Greek side, AEK Athens for a fee of €500,000. In his first season he did not have much playing time since he emerged as a back-up option for Michalis Kapsis and Mauricio Wright. Nevertheless, during the season he had the chance to play in the UEFA Champions League and the UEFA Cup. In the following season he made more appearances than the previous one, helped by the fact that he could also cover the position of the left-back.

=== Willem II ===
In the summer of 2004, after his end of contract, Kreek return to the Netherlands and signed for Willem II. He played at the club for about 1.5 years and at the beginning of 2006 he retired at the age of 35.

== International career ==
Kreek played with the Netherlands once on 22 February 1995 in the friendly match at home against Portugal which ended in a 0–1 defeat.

== Managerial career ==
After retiring, Kreek immediately began his managerial career at Ajax's academy. He worked in several positions at Ajax' academy until his departure in the summer 2013, where he joined Almere City as U19 manager. Beside that, he was also the head responsible of Almere's academy. In the 2015-16 season, Kreek also functioned as assistant manager for the Dutch U19 national team.

In August 2016, Kreek was appointed assistant manager to Frank de Boer at Italian club Inter Milan. However, de Boer and his staff, including Kreek, were fired in the beginning of November 2016.

In November 2017, Kreek was named assistant manager to Sarina Wiegman at the Netherlands women's national team. In addition to his duties as assistant manager of the Dutch women's team, he was also appointed manager of the U20 women's team in March 2018. He left the position in July 2019 to re-join Ajax, this time as a youth coordinator. In June 2021, he promoted to assistant manager for Jong Ajax under manager Johnny Heitinga.

== Honours ==
Ajax

- Eredivisie: 1989–90, 1993–94
- KNVB Cup: 1992–93
- Dutch Super Cup: 1993
- UEFA Cup: 1991–92
