= Raymond Bardel =

Swiss footballer (1928–2018)

Personal information
- Full name: Raymond Bardel
- Date of birth: December 17, 1928
- Place of birth: Yverdon-les-Bains, Switzerland
- Date of death: February 5, 2018 (aged 89)
- Place of death: Roussillon, Isère, France
- Position: Forward

Senior career*
Years	Team	Apps	(Gls)
1949–1952	FC Lausanne-Sport		
1952–1955	Yverdon-Sport FC		

International career
1951	Switzerland	2	(0)
- * Club domestic league appearances and goals

Raymond Bardel (17 December 1928 – 5 February 2018) was a Swiss footballer who played as a forward for FC Lausanne-Sport in the 1950–51 season. He was also the first person of color to play for the Switzerland national team.

== Career ==
Bardel was born in Yverdon-les-Bains, a town in the canton of Vaud in Switzerland. He joined FC Lausanne-Sport, a club based in Lausanne, in 1949. He played as a forward for the club in the 1950–51 season of the Swiss Super League, the top tier of Swiss football, where Lausanne-Sport became league champions in the 1950–51 season. He left the club in 1952, moving on to play three years for Yverdon-Sport.

== Personal life ==
Bardel died on 5 February 2018 at the age of 89. He was buried in Roussillon, Isère, a commune in the Isère department in southeastern France.
