= Marcel Horký =

Slovak footballer

Personal information
- Date of birth: 18 October 1973 (age 53)
- Position: Midfielder

Senior career*
Years	Team	Apps	(Gls)
–1997	FC Artmedia Petržalka		
1997–2000	FC Spartak Trnava		
2000–2002	FC Artmedia Petržalka		
2002–2003	Panionios		
2003–2004	Budapest Honvéd FC		
2006	1. FC Tatran Prešov		
2007	SKN St. Pölten		
- * Club domestic league appearances and goals

Marcel Horký (born 18 October 1973) is a retired Slovak football midfielder.
