= Aguinaldo Braga =

Brazilian footballer (born 1974)

Personal information
- Full name: Aguinaldo Braga de Jesus
- Date of birth: 9 August 1974 (age 52)
- Place of birth: Moeda, Brazil
- Height: 1.71 m (5 ft 7 1/2 in)
- Positions: Right back; midfielder

Youth career
- Moedense

Senior career*
Years	Team	Apps	(Gls)
- América Mineiro
- Comercial Belo Horizonte
- Uberlândia
- Atlético Mineiro
1999–2000	Makedonija	16	(0)
2000–2002	Vardar	35	(2)
2002–2003	→ Aris (loan)	24	(2)
2003–2004	Vardar	13	(0)
2004–2005	AO Kerkyra	19	(0)
2005–2009	Vardar	74	(1)
2009–2010	Teteks	3	(0)
2009–2010	→ Cementarnica (loan)	15	(1)
2010	Vardar	0	(0)

International career^{‡}
2002–2003	Macedonia	6	(0)
- * Club domestic league appearances and goals ‡ National team caps and goals as of 5 November 2009

Aguinaldo Braga de Jesus, better known simply as Aguinaldo Braga (born 9 August 1974 in Moeda, Brazil) is a Brazilian-Macedonian retired international football player.

== International career ==
He made his senior debut for North Macedonia in an April 2002 friendly match against Finland in Prilep and has earned a total of 6 caps, scoring no goals. His final international was a September 2003 European Championship qualification match against England.

== Honours ==
- Vardar Skopje
  - Macedonian Prva Liga: 2001–02
  - Macedonian Cup: 2007
