= Stelios Maistrellis =

Greek footballer (born 1979)

Personal information
- Full name: Stylianos Maistrellis
- Date of birth: 10 November 1979 (age 46)
- Place of birth: Mytilene, Greece
- Height: 1.94 m (6 ft 4 in)
- Position: Defender

Youth career
- Vyronas Moria

Senior career*
| Years | Team | Apps | (Gls) |
| 2001–2002 | Aiolikos | | |
| 2002–2005 | AEK Athens | 1 | (0) |
| 2004 | → Akratitos (loan) | 11 | (0) |
| 2005 | Levadiakos | 5 | (1) |
| 2005–2006 | Panachaiki | | |
| 2006 | Acharnaikos | | |
| 2006–2008 | Ethnikos Asteras | 5 | (1) |
| 2008 | Aiolikos | 12 | (0) |
| 2008–2009 | Lamia | 10 | (1) |
| 2009–2010 | Makedonikos | | |
| 2010 | Trikala | 1 | (0) |
| 2010–2011 | Anagennisi Giannitsa | | |
| 2011 | Niki Volos | | |
- * Club domestic league appearances and goals as of 9 April 2009

Stelios Maistrellis (Greek: Στέλιος Μαϊστρέλλης; born 10 November 1979) is a former Greek footballer who played as a defender.

== Club career ==
Maistrellis began his career at Vyronas Moria. In 2001 he joined Aiolikos, where he played for one season. On 7 June 2002 he made the big step of his career and signed for AEK Athens. There, he failed to establish in the squad due to the harsh competition and on 26 January 2004 he was loaned Akratitos. On 31 January 2005 his contract was terminated and Maistrellis signed for Levadiakos.

Maistrellis continued his career with short spells at Panachaiki, Acharnaikos, Ethnikos Asteras and in 2008 he returned to Aiolikos. Afterwards, he joined Lamia for a while and in 2009 he played for Makedonikos. In the following seasons Maistrellis played for Trikala, Anagennisi Giannitsa and Niki Volos, where he finished his career in 2011.
