= Walter Centeno =

Costa Rican footballer (born 1974)

Wálter Centeno Corea
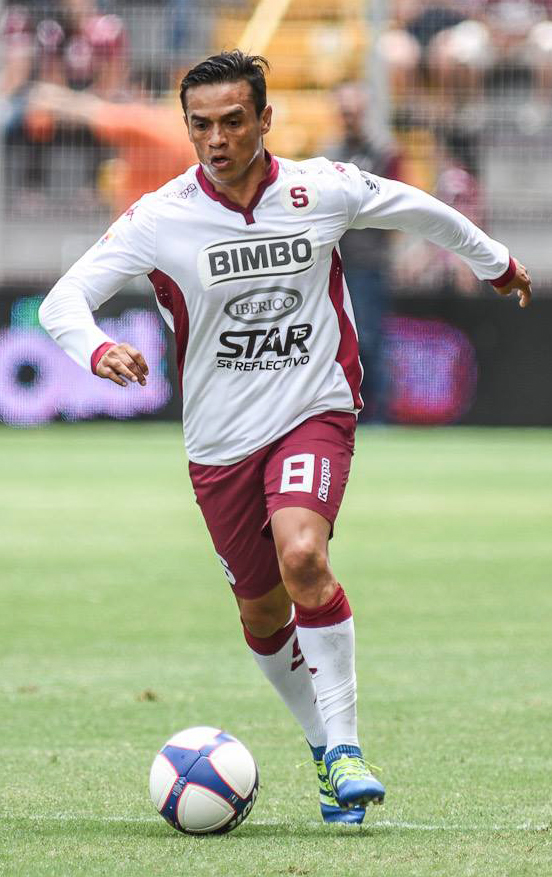
- Centeno with Saprissa in 2016

Personal information
- Full name: Wálter Centeno Corea
- Date of birth: 6 October 1974 (age 52)
- Place of birth: Palmar Sur, Costa Rica
- Height: 1.74 m (5 ft 9 in)
- Position: Attacking midfielder

Team information
- Current team: Guadalupe (manager)

Youth career
- Compañeros de Tibás

Senior career*
| Years | Team | Apps | (Gls) |
| 1995–2002 | Saprissa | 152 | (18) |
| 1995–1996 | → Belén (loan) | 52 | (3) |
| 2002–2003 | AEK Athens | 14 | (2) |
| 2003–2012 | Saprissa | 251 | (47) |
| 2013 | Bayamón | 11 | (3) |
| Total | | 480 | (72) |

International career
| 1995–2009 | Costa Rica | 137 | (24) |

Managerial career
- 2015–2016: Puntarenas
- 2016–2019: Municipal Grecia
- 2019–2021: Saprissa
- 2021–: Guadalupe
- * Club domestic league appearances and goals

Wálter Centeno Corea (born 6 October 1974) is a Costa Rican former professional footballer who played as an attacking midfielder and current manager of Santos de Guapiles.

He was a regular member of the Costa Rica national team and holds the record for appearances, having gained 137 caps (135 FIFA official caps) and scored 24 goals.

== Club career ==
=== Saprissa ===
Nicknamed Paté, Centeno started his career at Saprissa, who loaned him out to Belén for whom he made his professional debut on 4 February 1995 against Alajuelense. He scored his first goal on 3 September 1995 for Belén against Turrialba. He earned his nickname in his childhood due to his love for eating pate's.

=== AEK Athens ===
On 8 July 2002 Centeno moved to Greece and was transferred AEK Athens. for a fee of €410,000. There he played alongside his compatriot, Mauricio Wright. While playing for AEK, he participated in the UEFA Champions League group stage managing to score in the team's away home draws against Real Madrid at Santiago Bernabéu in the 2–2 draw and Roma at Stadio Olimpico in 1–1 draw, as they achieved the record of drawing all the matches of the group stage. After one season, Centeno filed an appeal for debts of club to him and on 14 July 2003 he was released.

=== Back at Saprissa ===
He returned to Saprissa, where he was named the best player of the 2003–04 Costa Rican season by the Costa Rican sports media, after scoring nine goals while orchestrating Saprissa's offense, helping the team to win the league.

With Saprissa, he won 10 national championships and one CONCACAF Champions Cup, winning the title with a 3–2 aggregate win over Mexico's UNAM Pumas in the final. He was part of the team that played the 2005 FIFA Club World Championship, where Saprissa finished third behind São Paulo and Liverpool. His appearance at this tournament was considered as outstanding by FIFA experts.

He retired in 2012, his final league match was on 5 May 2012 for Saprissa against Santos de Guápiles. Saprissa retired the no. 8 shirt in his honour as well as definitely retiring the no. 10 shirt of Alonso Solís.

=== Puerto Rico ===
In April 2013, Centeno came out of retirement to join Puerto Rican side Bayamón.

== International career ==
Centeno played his first game for the Costa Rica national football team on 27 September 1995 against Jamaica. He has been a fixture for the team for the last thirteen years, playing in the Pan American Games held in Mar del Plata, Argentina, in 1995; the Copa América tournaments of 1997, 2001 and 2004; plus the FIFA World Cup in 2002 and 2006. On 1 April 2009, he surpassed the record of caps for Costa Rica (held then by Luis Marín, 124 caps, 5 goals) as at 18 November 2009 he has 137 caps and 24 goals. He was the captain of Costa Rica national football team for the last part of 2010 FIFA World Cup qualifications. Rodrigo Kenton, the appointed manager replacing the fired Hernan Medford, chose him for covering this important role in the team because of his experience, hardening and leadership. Centeno played his last game on the national team on 18 November 2009, where they tied 1–1, in which he scored. The game meant that Costa Rica will not be in World Cup 2010. Centeno's goal was his last with as an International player, and it also marked the last goal of the 2010 FIFA World Cup qualifying stage.

Shortly after that game, he announced his quitting from national team.

== Personal life ==
Centeno is a son of Benigno Centeno and Lidieth Corea and he is married to Vivian Gutiérrez with whom he has three children.

== Career statistics ==
=== International ===
Appearances and goals by national team and year
| National team | Year | Apps | Goals |
|---|---|---|---|
| Costa Rica | 1995 | 1 | 0 |
| Costa Rica | 1996 | 0 | 0 |
| Costa Rica | 1997 | 0 | 0 |
| Costa Rica | 1998 | 1 | 0 |
| Costa Rica | 1999 | 9 | 2 |
| Costa Rica | 2000 | 15 | 1 |
| Costa Rica | 2001 | 13 | 2 |
| Costa Rica | 2002 | 13 | 2 |
| Costa Rica | 2003 | 15 | 5 |
| Costa Rica | 2004 | 13 | 0 |
| Costa Rica | 2005 | 10 | 3 |
| Costa Rica | 2006 | 6 | 0 |
| Costa Rica | 2007 | 17 | 4 |
| Costa Rica | 2008 | 10 | 1 |
| Costa Rica | 2009 | 14 | 4 |
| Total | | 137 | 24 |

Scores and results list Costa Rica's goal tally first, score column indicates score after each Centeno goal.

List of international goals scored by Walter Centeno
| No. | Date | Venue | Opponent | Score | Result | Competition |
|---|---|---|---|---|---|---|
| 1 | 24 February 1999 | Estadio Ricardo Saprissa Aymá, San José, Costa Rica | Jamaica | 9–0 | 9–0 | Friendly |
| 2 | 25 November 1999 | Estadio Alejandro Morera Soto, Alajuela, Costa Rica | Slovakia | 1–0 | 4–0 | Friendly |
| 3 | 1 July 2000 | Estadio Alejandro Morera Soto, Alajuela, Costa Rica | Panama | 2–1 | 5–1 | Friendly |
| 4 | 30 May 2001 | Estadio Olímpico Metropolitano, San Pedro Sula, Honduras | Panama | 2–1 | 2–1 | 2001 UNCAF Nations Cup |
| 5 | 3 June 2001 | Estadio Olímpico Metropolitano, San Pedro Sula, Honduras | El Salvador | 1–1 | 1–1 | 2001 UNCAF Nations Cup |
| 6 | 26 January 2001 | Miami Orange Bowl, Miami, United States | Haiti | 1–0 | 2–1 | 2002 CONCACAF Gold Cup |
| 7 | 9 May 2002 | Estadio Ricardo Saprissa Aymá, San José, Costa Rica | Colombia | 1–2 | 1–2 | Friendly |
| 8 | 13 February 2003 | Rommel Fernández Stadium, Panama City, Panama | Guatemala | 1–0 | 1–1 | 2003 UNCAF Nations Cup |
| 9 | 16 July 2003 | Gillette Stadium, Foxborough, United States | Cuba | 1–0 | 3–0 | 2003 CONCACAF Gold Cup |
| 10 | 19 July 2003 | Gillette Stadium, Foxborough, United States | El Salvador | 2–1 | 5–2 | 2003 CONCACAF Gold Cup |
| 11 | 19 July 2003 | Gillette Stadium, Foxborough, United States | El Salvador | 3–2 | 5–2 | 2003 CONCACAF Gold Cup |
| 12 | 19 July 2003 | Gillette Stadium, Foxborough, United States | El Salvador | 5–2 | 5–2 | 2003 CONCACAF Gold Cup |
| 13 | 12 January 2005 | Estadio Ricardo Saprissa Aymá, San José, Costa Rica | Haiti | 1–0 | 3–3 | Friendly |
| 14 | 3 September 2005 | Estadio Rommel Fernández, Panama City, Panama | Panama | 2–0 | 3–1 | 2006 FIFA World Cup qualification |
| 15 | 7 September 2005 | Estadio Ricardo Saprissa Aymá, San José, Costa Rica | Trinidad and Tobago | 2–0 | 2–0 | 2006 FIFA World Cup qualification |
| 16 | 6 June 2007 | Miami Orange Bowl, Miami, United States | Canada | 1–0 | 1–2 | 2007 CONCACAF Gold Cup |
| 17 | 9 June 2007 | Miami Orange Bowl, Miami, United States | Haiti | 1–0 | 1–1 | 2007 CONCACAF Gold Cup |
| 18 | 11 June 2007 | Miami Orange Bowl, Miami, United States | Guadeloupe | 1–0 | 1–0 | 2007 CONCACAF Gold Cup |
| 19 | 17 October 2007 | Estadio Ricardo Saprissa Aymá, San José, Costa Rica | Haiti | 1–0 | 1–1 | Friendly |
| 20 | 11 October 2008 | André Kamperveen Stadion, Paramaribo, Suriname | Suriname | 1–0 | 4–1 | 2010 FIFA World Cup qualification |
| 21 | 1 April 2009 | Estadio Ricardo Saprissa Aymá, San José, Costa Rica | El Salvador | 1–0 | 1–0 | 2010 FIFA World Cup qualification |
| 22 | 10 July 2009 | FIU Stadium, Miami, United States | Canada | 2–2 | 2–2 | 2009 CONCACAF Gold Cup |
| 23 | 10 October 2009 | Estadio Ricardo Saprissa Aymá, San José, Costa Rica | Trinidad and Tobago | 2–0 | 4–0 | 2010 FIFA World Cup qualification |
| 24 | 18 November 2009 | Estadio Centenario, Montevideo, Uruguay | Uruguay | 1–1 | 1–1 | 2010 FIFA World Cup qualification |

== Honours ==
Deportivo Saprissa

- Primera División de Costa Rica (10): 1997–98, 1998–99, 2003–04, 2005–06, 2006–07, 2007 Apertura, 2008 Clausura-Invierno, Verano-Apertura 2008, Campeonato de Verano-Clausura 2010
- CONCACAF Champions' Cup: 2005
- Copa Interclubes UNCAF: 1998, 2003
- FIFA Club World Cup third place: 2005

Costa Rica

- CONCACAF Gold Cup: runner-up 2002
- UNCAF Nations Cup: 1999, 2003, 2007; runner-up 2001

Individual

- CONCACAF Gold Cup All-Tournament team: 2007
- CONCACAF Gold Cup Top scorer: 2003
- CONCACAF Gold Cup Best XI: 2003

== See also ==
- List of men's footballers with 100 or more international caps
