= Alain Raguel =

French footballer (born 1976)

Personal information
- Full name: Alain Pierre Virgile Raguel
- Date of birth: 6 October 1976 (age 50)
- Place of birth: Lille, France
- Height: 1.75 m (5 ft 9 in)
- Positions: Right midfielder; right-back

Senior career*
Years	Team	Apps	(Gls)
1998–1999	Lille	22	(0)
1999–2000	ASOA Valence	29	(0)
2000–2004	Panionios	73	(2)
2004–2005	Panathinaikos	0	(0)
2005	Chalkidona	1	(0)
2005–2007	Atromitos	30	(0)
2007–2008	Iraklis	13	(0)
2008–2009	Olympiacos Volos	12	(0)

Managerial career
- 2021–2022: Lille U16 (head coach)
- 2022–: Lille U19 (assistant coach)
- * Club domestic league appearances and goals

Alain Pierre Virgile Raguel (born 6 September 1976) is a French former professional footballer who played as a right midfielder or right-back.
