= Eugène Afrika =

Luxembourgish footballer

Personal information
- Date of birth: 14 April 1971 (age 55)
- Position: Midfielder

Senior career*
Years	Team	Apps	(Gls)
1990–1993	Red Boys Differdange		
1993–2001	Union Luxembourg		
2001–2003	Jeunesse Esch		

International career
1998–1999	Luxembourg	2	(0)
- * Club domestic league appearances and goals

Eugène Afrika (born 14 April 1971) is a Luxembourgish retired football midfielder.

He made his debut for the Luxembourg national team on 10 October 1998 in a European Championship qualifying game against Poland. His second and final cap came in March 1999 against Iceland.

In February 2011, he was sentenced to five years' imprisonment for rape. This sentence was later reduced to three years' imprisonment plus two years suspended. In January 2012, he appealed against his sentence, arguing that several procedural errors had been made. In October 2012, his appeal was rejected.
