= Livio Prieto =

Argentine footballer

Personal information
- Full name: Livio Armando Prieto
- Date of birth: 31 July 1981 (age 45)
- Place of birth: Córdoba, Argentina
- Height: 1.68 m (5 ft 6 in)
- Position: Midfielder

Senior career*
Years	Team	Apps	(Gls)
1995–1997	Bella Vista de Cordoba	1	(0)
1998–1999	Deportivo Español	36	(1)
1999–2002	Independiente	0	(0)
2002–2003	AEK Athens	13	(0)
2003–2004	Nueva Chicago		
2004–2005	Belgrano	3	(0)
2005	Atlético Mineiro		
2006	Sfaxien	25	(1)
2006–2007	Santa Clara		
2007–2008	Newcastle Jets	15	(2)
2008	Emelec	2	(0)
2008–2009	Paços Ferreira	2	(0)
2010	Duque Caxias		
2010–2011	Sportivo Italiano		
2013–	MacNab B	30	(20)

International career
1997	Argentina U17	4	(0)
2001	Argentina U20	?	(?)
- * Club domestic league appearances and goals

Livio Armando Prieto (born 31 July 1981) is an Argentine former professional footballer who played as a midfielder.

== Career ==
Prieto played in his early career for Club Atlético Bella Vista, Club Social, Deportivo y Cultural Español and Club Atlético Independiente.

On 7 July 2002 he moved to Greece and signed for AEK Athens. He failed to establish in the club and on 14 July 2003 his contract was terminated and Prieto returned to Argentina signing for Club Atlético Nueva Chicago. In the following season he moved to Club Atlético Belgrano.

In 2005–06, Prieto moved abroad again, joining Clube Atlético Mineiro in Brazil, with subsequent spells at Club Sportif Sfaxien and C.D. Santa Clara. Prieto had agreed to terms to play for the Newcastle United Jets FC in the 2007–08 season of the Australian A-League, but apparently reneged on his contract after having been signed as a direct replacement for Nick Carle who left the club at the end of the previous campaign.

After leaving, he signed with Ecuador's Club Sport Emelec, moving shortly after to Portuguese top division side F.C. Paços de Ferreira. During one sole season, he appeared in two matches out of 30 (a total of 43 minutes).

On 18 December 2009, Prieto was hired by Duque de Caxias Futebol Clube in Brazil. After appearing rarely during his only season with the club, spent in Série B, he returned to his country and joined lowly Sportivo Italiano.
