= Mauricio Wright =

Costa Rican footballer and manager (born 1970)

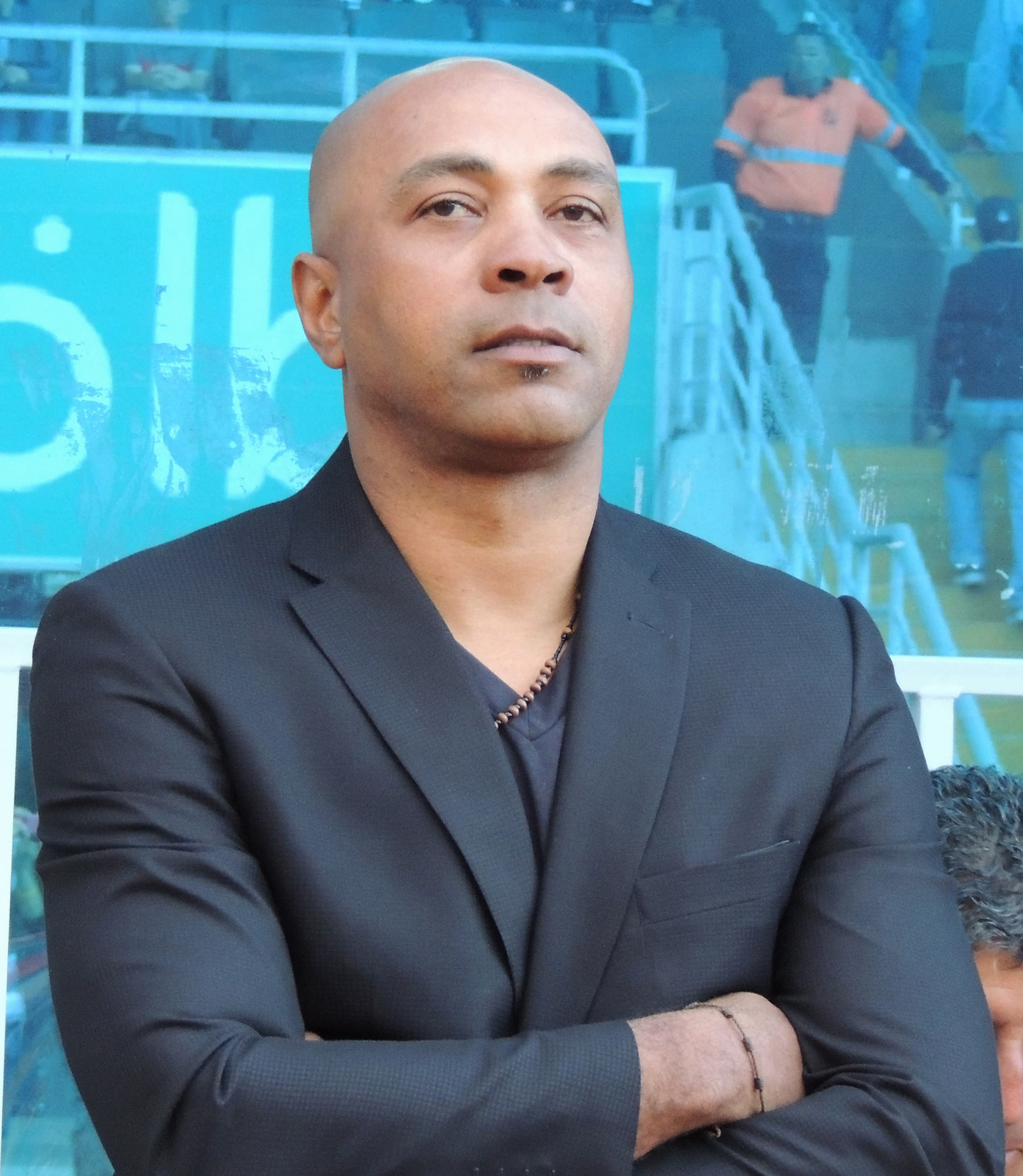

Personal information
- Full name: Wilber Mauricio Wright Reynolds
- Date of birth: 20 December 1970 (age 55)
- Place of birth: San José, Costa Rica
- Height: 1.87 m (6 ft 2 in)
- Position: Defender

Team information
- Current team: Cartaginés (manager)

Youth career
- Saprissa

Senior career*
Years	Team	Apps	(Gls)
1992–1998	Saprissa	235	(12)
1998–1999	Comunicaciones	22	(2)
1999–2000	San Jose Earthquakes	36	(3)
2000–2001	New England Revolution	40	(3)
2002	Herediano	28	(1)
2002–2003	AEK Athens	25	(0)
2003	Shenyang Ginde	3	(0)
2004–2006	Herediano	31	(3)
2007	Saprissa	1	(0)
Total		421	(24)

International career
1994–2005	Costa Rica	67	(6)

Managerial career
- 2007–2010: Brujas
- 2011: Puntarenas
- 2011–2012: Pérez Zeledón
- 2012–2014: Deportivo Malacateco
- 2014–2015: Cartaginés
- 2015: Herediano
- 2015: Municipal
- 2016: Pérez Zeledón
- 2017: UCR
- 2017–2018: Deportivo Malacateco
- 2020: Barrio México
- 2020–2021: Aserrí
- 2022: Saprissa
- Cartaginés (assistant)
- 2023: Grecia
- 2023–: Cartaginés
- * Club domestic league appearances and goals

Wílber Mauricio Wright Reynolds (born 20 December 1970) is a Costa Rican former professional footballer who played as a defender and current manager of Cartaginés. He was a key member of the Costa Rica national team for over ten years.

== Club career ==
Wright started his career at the academies of Saprissa, where in 1992 he was promoted to the first team. He moved abroad to play for Comunicaciones in Guatemala, where he played alongside compatriots Rolando Fonseca, Floyd Guthrie and Jéwisson Bennett. He then played three seasons (1999–2001) in Major League Soccer, split between the San Jose Clash (later Earthquakes) and the New England Revolution, alongside William Sunsing. He scored six goals and added three assists in MLS league play. Wright also had a brief spell at Herediano.

His performances in the World Cup attracted the people of AEK Athens who signed him on 5 July 2002 after his compatriot, Walter Centeno. He performed very well, while also playing in the UEFA Champions League scoring the winner against APOEL on the qualifiers on 28 August 2002. His contract with the club had a duration of three years, however he files an appeal and on 14 July was released after some issues with the administration about his salary. He also had a short stint in China with Shenyang Ginde. With Saprissa, he won three national championships and two CONCACAF Champions Cup, and returned to the team to play his last season as a professional, accomplishing his dream of retiring as a 'morado'.

== International career ==
Wright made his debut for Costa Rica national football team at the December 1995 UNCAF Nations Cup match against Belize and earned a total of 67 caps, scoring 6 goals. After not playing in qualifying rounds, he started in the 2002 FIFA World Cup, scoring a goal. He also played (and scored) in the 1997 and 2004 Copa Américas.

His final international was a July 2005 CONCACAF Gold Cup match against Cuba.

== Managerial career ==
Wright was named manager of Brujas in May 2007 and he won the 2009 winter championship with the club. He has coached teams in Costa Rica and Guatemala and took the reins at Cartaginés in May 2014. He was announced the new manager at Herediano in December 2014, replacing Jafet Soto. In May 2021, he won the Clausura season with Saprissa, thus giving the team its record 36th title.

== Honours ==
Sarprissa

- Primera División de Costa Rica: 1993–94, 1994–95, 1997–98, 2006–07
- CONCACAF Champions' Cup: 1993, 1995
- Central American Club Championship: 1998, 2007

International

- CONCACAF Gold Cup Best XI: 2003

Individual

- MLS All-Star: 1999
