= 2022–23 Olympiacos F.C. season =

Olympiacos
2022–23 season
- Owner: Evangelos Marinakis
- President: Evangelos Marinakis
- Manager: Pedro Martins (until 1 August 2022); Carlos Corberán (until 18 September 2022); Míchel (until 3 April 2023); José Anigo
- Stadium: Karaiskakis Stadium
- Super League Greece: 3rd
- Greek Cup: Semi-final
- Champions League: Second qualifying round
- Europa League: Group stage
- Top goalscorer: League: Cédric Bakambu (18); All: Cédric Bakambu (18)
- Highest home attendance: 31,717
- Lowest home attendance: 10,047
- Biggest win: Olympiacos 6–0 Levadiakos
- Biggest defeat: Olympiacos 0–4 Maccabi Haifa
Home colours	Away colours	Third colours

The 2022–23 season was the 98th season in existence of Olympiacos and the club's 64th consecutive season in the top flight of Greek football. In addition to the Greek Super League, Olympiacos participated in this season's Greek Cup, UEFA Champions League. The season covers the period from June 2022 to late May 2023.

== Players ==
=== First team ===
As of 13 April 2023

Squad No.	Name	Nationality	Position(s)	Place of birth	Date of birth (Age)	Previous club
Goalkeepers
31	Ögmundur Kristinsson	(Iceland)	GK	Reykjavík, Iceland	19 June 1989 (33)	(Greece) AEL
88	Konstantinos Tzolakis	(Greece)	GK	Chania, Greece	8 November 2002 (19)	(Greece) Olympiacos U19
91	Alexandros Paschalakis	(Greece)	GK	Athens, Greece	28 July 1989 (33)	(Greece) PAOK
Defenders
2	Ramon	(Brazil)	LB	São João de Meriti, Brazil	13 March 2021 (21)	(Brazil) Flamengo
4	Panagiotis Retsos	(Greece)	CB	Johannesburg, South Africa	9 August 1998 (24)	(Italy) Hellas Verona
14	Thanasis Androutsos	(Greece)	RB/RW/AM	Athens, Greece	6 May 1997 (25)	(Greece) Olympiacos U19
15	Sokratis Papastathopoulos	(Greece)	CB	Kalamata, Greece	9 June 1988 (34)	(England) Arsenal
17	Marios Vrousai	(Greece)	RB/LW/RW	Nafpaktos, Greece	2 July 1998 (24)	(Greece) Olympiacos U19
23	Rodinei	(Brazil)	RB	Tatuí, Brazil	29 January 1992 (30)	(Brazil) Flamengo
24	Ousseynou Ba	(Senegal)	CB	Dakar, Senegal	11 November 1995 (26)	(France) Gazélec Ajaccio
45	Oleg Reabciuk	(Moldova) (Portugal)	LB	Charneca de Caparica, Portugal	16 January 1998 (24)	(Portugal) Paços de Ferreira
66	Pape Abou Cissé	(Senegal)	CB	Pikine, Senegal	14 September 1995 (27)	(France) Ajaccio
74	Andreas Ntoi	(Greece) (Albania)	CB/DM	Athens, Greece	2 February 2003(20)	(Greece) Olympiacos U19
Midfielders
6	Yann M'Vila	(France)	DM	Amiens, France	29 June 1990 (32)	(France) Saint-Étienne
7	Kostas Fortounis	(Greece)	AM	Trikala, Greece	16 October 1992 (29)	(Germany) Kaiserslautern
16	Zymer Bytyqi	(Kosovo)	LW/RW	Sint-Truiden, Belgium	11 September 1996 (26)	(Turkey) Konyaspor
19	Georgios Masouras	(Greece)	LW/RW	Kechrinia, Greece	24 August 1996 (26)	(Greece) Panionios
21	Pep Biel	(Spain)	AM/RW	Sant Joan, Spain	5 September 1996 (26)	(Denmark) Copenhagen
27	Pajtim Kasami	(Switzerland) (North Macedonia)	CM	Andelfingen, Switzerland	2 June 1992 (30)	(Switzerland) Basel
28	Mathieu Valbuena	(France)	LW/RW/AM	Bruges, France	28 September 1984 (37)	(Turkey) Fenerbahçe
33	Hwang In-beom	(South Korea)	CM/AM	Daejeon, South Korea	20 September 1996 (25)	(Russia) Rubin Kazan
38	Diadie Samassékou	(Mali)	DM	Bamako, Mali	11 January 1996 (26)	(Germany) Hoffenheim
47	Sergi Canós	(Spain)	RW	Nules, Spain	2 February 1997 (25)	(England) Brentford
77	Garry Rodrigues	(Cape Verde) (Netherlands)	LW/RW	Rotterdam, Netherlands	27 November 1990 (31)	(Saudi Arabia) Al-Ittihad
Forwards
11	Youssef El-Arabi	(Morocco) (France)	FW	Caen, France	3 February 1987 (35)	(Qatar) Al-Duhail
94	Cédric Bakambu	(Democratic Republic of the Congo) (France)	FW	Vitry-sur-Seine, France	11 April 1991 (31)	(France) Marseille

=== Out on loan ===
As of 31 January 2023

Name	Nationality	Position(s)	Date of birth (Age)	To Club	Notes
Fotis Kitsos	(Greece)	LB	31 March 2003 (19)	(Cyprus) Omonia	
Mamadou Kané	(Guinea)	DM/CM	22 January 1997 (25)	(Cyprus) Pafos	Deal includes option to buy
Pêpê	(Portugal)	DM/CM	20 May 1997 (25)	(Spain) Cartagena	
Mady Camara	(Guinea)	CM	28 February 1997 (25)	(Italy) Roma	Deal includes obligation to buy
Bandiougou Fadiga	(France) (Mali)	CM/AM	15 January 2001 (21)	(Greece) Ionikos	
Henry Onyekuru	(Nigeria)	LW/RW	5 June 1997 (25)	(Turkey) Adana Demirspor	Deal includes option to buy
João Carvalho	(Portugal)	LW/AM	9 March 1997 (25)	(Portugal) Estoril	Deal includes option to buy
Philip Zinckernagel	(Denmark)	LW/RW/AM	16 December 1994 (27)	(Belgium) Standard Liège	Deal includes option to buy
Lazar Ranđelović	(Serbia)	LW/RW	5 August 1997 (26)	(Russia) Ural	
Maximiliano Lovera	(Argentina)	RW/AM	9 March 1999 (23)	(Greece) Ionikos	
Ahmed Hassan	(Egypt) (Portugal)	FW	5 March 1993 (29)	(Turkey) Alanyaspor	
Pierre Kunde	(Cameroon)	CM	26 July 1995 (27)	(Germany) VfL Bochum	Deal includes obligation to buy
Aboubakar Kamara	(Mauritania) (France)	FW	7 March 1995 (27)	(Greece) Aris	Deal includes obligation to buy
Doron Leidner	(Israel) (Romania)	LB	26 April 2002 (20)	Austria Wien	
Andreas Bouchalakis	(Greece)	DM/CM	5 April 1993 (29)	(Turkey) Konyaspor	
Aguibou Camara	(Guinea)	LW/AM	20 May 2001 (21)	(Greece) Atromitos	

== Backroom staff ==
=== Coaching staff ===
Position	Staff
Sport director	(France) Christian Karembeu
Director of football	(France) José Anigo
Head of football department	(Greece) Avraam Papadopoulos
Head coach	(Spain) Míchel
Assistant coaches	(Spain) Juan Carlos Mandiá
Assistant coaches	(Spain) Adrián González
Analysts	(Greece) Giannis Vogiatzakis
Analysts	(Greece) Iosif Loukas
Fitness coaches	(Spain) Enrique Sanz Ramirez
Fitness coaches	(Greece) Christos Mourikis
Goalkeepers' trainer	(Greece) Panagiotis Agriogiannis
Rehabilitation trainer	(Greece) Kostas Liougkos
Medical team
Doctor	(Greece) Christos Theos
Physios	(Greece) Nikos Lykouresis
Physios	(Greece) Giorgos Zouridakis
Physios	(Greece) Stavros Petrocheilos
Physios	(Greece) Anastasios Galazoulas
Physios	(Greece) Panagiotis Karamouzas
Nutritionist	(Portugal) Hernani Araujo Gomes
Scouts
Head of scouting	(Greece) Giannis Theodorou
Scout	(Greece) Simos Havos
Data scout	(Israel) Kobi Michaeli

== Transfers ==
=== In ===
Νο.	Pos.	Nat.	Name	Age	Moving from	Type	Transfer window	Contract ends	Transfer fee	Notes	Source
	DF	(Greece)	Giannis Masouras	25	(Netherlands) Sparta Rotterdam	End of loan	Summer	2023		B team	
	MF	(Greece)	Alexandros Nikolias	28	(Greece) AEL	End of loan	Summer	Undisclosed			
23	DF	(Greece)	Leonardo Koutris	26	(Germany) Fortuna Düsseldorf	End of loan	Summer	2023			
	MF	(Serbia)	Nikola Čumić	23	(Switzerland) Luzern	End of loan	Summer	2024			
97	MF	(Serbia)	Lazar Ranđelović	24	(Spain) Leganés	End of loan	Summer	2024			
	DF	(Portugal)	Rúben Semedo	28	(Portugal) Porto	End of loan	Summer	2023			
	MF	(Portugal)	Pêpê	25	(Portugal) Famalicão	End of loan	Summer	2024			
	MF	(Argentina)	Maximiliano Lovera	23	(Cyprus) Omonia	End of loan	Summer	2024			
9	FW	(Egypt)	Ahmed Hassan	29	(Turkey) Konyaspor	End of loan	Summer	2023			
	MF	(Italy)	Adrian Galliani	21	(Greece) Panionios	End of loan	Summer	2022		B team	
	FW	(Czech Republic)	Denis Alijagić	19	(Czech Republic) Slavia Prague	Transfer	Summer	2025	€350k	B team	
26	DF	(Spain)	Gonzalo Ávila	24	(England) Huddersfield	Transfer	Summer	2025	€1M		
10	MF	(Denmark)	Philip Zinckernagel	27	(England) Watford	Transfer	Summer	2025	€2M		
47	FW	(Mauritania)	Aboubakar Kamara	27	(Greece) Aris	Transfer	Summer	2025	€5M		
2	DF	(Croatia)	Šime Vrsaljko	30	(Spain) Atlético Madrid	Transfer	Summer	2025	Free		
33	MF	(South Korea)	Hwang In-beom	25	(Russia) Rubin Kazan	Transfer	Summer	2025	Free		
16	DF	(Israel)	Doron Leidner	20	(Israel) Hapoel Tel Aviv	Transfer	Summer	2026	€2M		
	FW	(Greece)	Anestis Vlachomitros	21	(Greece) Lamia	Transfer	Summer	Undisclosed	Free	B team	
30	MF	(United States)	Konrad de la Fuente	21	(France) Marseille	Loan	Summer	2023	Free		
	FW	(Greece)	Aggelos Argyriou	19	(Greece) Panionios	Transfer	Summer	2025	Free	B team	
	DF	(Greece)	Vasilis Katsoulidis	20	(Greece) Kozani	Transfer	Summer	2024	Free	B team	
18	FW	(South Korea)	Hwang Ui-jo	30	(England) Nottingham Forest	Loan	Summer	2023	Free		
4	DF	(Greece)	Panagiotis Retsos	24	(Italy) Hellas Verona	Loan	Summer	2023	Free	Obligation to buy in the end of 2022–23 season for an undisclosed fee	
21	MF	(Spain)	Pep Biel	25	(Denmark) Copenhagen	Transfer	Summer	2027	€6M		
20	MF	(England)	Josh Bowler	23	(England) Nottingham Forest	Loan	Summer	2023	Free		
	DF	(Senegal)	Mouhamadou Cissé	24	(France) Côte Bleue	Transfer	Summer	Undisclosed	Free	B team	
12	DF	(Brazil)	Marcelo	34	(Spain) Real Madrid	Transfer	Summer	2024	Free		
10	MF	(Colombia)	James Rodríguez	31	(Qatar) Al-Rayyan	Transfer	Summer	2023	Free		
38	MF	(Mali)	Diadie Samassékou	26	(Germany) Hoffenheim	Loan	Summer	2023	Free		
94	FW	(Democratic Republic of the Congo)	Cédric Bakambu	31	(France) Marseille	Transfer	Summer	2025	Free		
	DF	(Greece)	Konstantinos Chrysopoulos	19	(Greece) Aris	Transfer	Summer	Undisclosed	Free	B team	
	MF	(Greece)	Christos Karanatsios	18	(Greece) Pierikos	Transfer	Summer	Undisclosed	Free	B team	
91	GK	(Greece)	Alexandros Paschalakis	33	(Greece) PAOK	Transfer	Summer	2023	Free		
27	MF	(Switzerland)	Pajtim Kasami	30	(Switzerland) Basel	Transfer	Summer	2023	Free		
23	DF	(Brazil)	Rodinei	30	(Brazil) Flamengo	Transfer	Winter	2025	Free		
2	DF	(Brazil)	Ramon	21	(Brazil) Flamengo	Transfer	Winter	2027	€1.5M		
47	MF	(Spain)	Sergi Canós	25	(England) Brentford	Loan	Winter	2023	Free		
16	MF	(Kosovo)	Zymer Bytyqi	26	(Turkey) Konyaspor	Transfer	Winter	Unknown	Unknown		

▼ Total Spending: €17.85M

=== Out ===
Νο.	Pos.	Nat.	Name	Age	Moving to	Type	Transfer window	Transfer fee	Notes	Source
10	MF	(Portugal)	Rony Lopes	26	(Spain) Sevilla	End of loan	Summer			
33	DF	(Poland)	Michał Karbownik	21	(England) Brighton & Hove Albion	End of loan	Summer			
26	MF	(Greece)	Georgios Xenitidis	22	(Greece) Panetolikos	Transfer	Summer	Free		
25	DF	(Serbia)	Svetozar Marković	22	(Serbia) Partizan	Transfer	Summer	€800k	B team	
90	MF	(Greece)	Vasilis Sourlis	19	(Netherlands) Fortuna Sittard	Loan	Summer	Free	B team	
97	MF	(Greece)	Dimitris Pinakas	20	(Cyprus) Apollon Limassol	Loan	Summer	Free	B team	
7	MF	(Nigeria)	Henry Onyekuru	25	(Turkey) Adana Demirspor	Loan	Summer	Free	Obligation to buy in the end of 2022–23 season if qualified for European competitions	
41	DF	(Greece)	Petros Bagalianis	21	(Greece) PAS Giannina	Loan	Summer	Free	B team	
	DF	(Portugal)	Rúben Semedo	28	(Qatar) Al-Duhail	Transfer	Summer	€3.5M		
34	DF	(Greece)	Avraam Papadopoulos	36		Retired	Summer			
	MF	(Italy)	Adrian Galliani	21		Released	Summer		B team	
	MF	(Portugal)	Pêpê	25	(Turkey) Ankaragücü	Loan	Summer	Free		
29	FW	(Brazil)	Tiquinho	31	(Brazil) Botafogo	Transfer	Summer	€1M		
44	GK	(Greece)	Ilias Karargyris	20	(Greece) Proodeftiki	Transfer	Summer	Free	B team	
20	MF	(Portugal)	João Carvalho	25	(Portugal) Estoril	Loan	Summer	Free		
36	MF	(Guinea)	Mamadou Kané	25	(Cyprus) Pafos	Loan	Summer	Free		
	MF	(Argentina)	Maximiliano Lovera	23	(Greece) Ionikos	Loan	Summer	Free		
21	MF	(France)	Bandiougou Fadiga	21	(Greece) Ionikos	Loan	Summer	Free		
4	MF	(Guinea)	Mady Camara	25	(Italy) Roma	Loan	Summer	€1.5M	Obligation to buy in the end of 2022–23 season for €11.5M	
75	DF	(Greece)	Fotis Kitsos	19	(Cyprus) Omonia	Loan	Summer	Free	B team	
	MF	(Serbia)	Nikola Čumić	23	(Serbia) Vojvodina	Transfer	Summer	Free		
	DF	(Montenegro)	Almir Klica	23	(Luxembourg) Dudelange	Transfer	Summer	Free	B team	
10	MF	(Denmark)	Philip Zinckernagel	27	(Belgium) Standard Liège	Loan	Summer	Free		
9	FW	(Egypt)	Ahmed Hassan	29	(Turkey) Alanyaspor	Loan	Summer	Free		
97	MF	(Serbia)	Lazar Ranđelović	25	(Russia) Ural	Loan	Summer	Free		
	MF	(Greece)	Alexandros Nikolias	28	(Greece) AEL	Transfer	Summer	Free		
	MF	(Senegal)	Mouhamadou Cissé	19	(Greece) Proodeftiki	Loan	Summer	Free	B team	
44	DF	(Greece)	Kostas Manolas	31	(United Arab Emirates) Sharjah	Transfer	Summer	Undisclosed		
27	DF	(France)	Kenny Lala	31	(France) Brest	Transfer	Winter	Free		
2	DF	(Croatia)	Šime Vrsaljko	30		Released	Winter	Free		
23	DF	(Greece)	Leonardo Koutris	27	(Poland) Pogoń Szczecin	Transfer	Winter	Free		
	DF	(Greece)	Giannis Masouras	25	(Poland) Miedź Legnica	Released	Winter	Free		
8	MF	(Cameroon)	Pierre Kunde	27	(Germany) VfL Bochum	Loan	Winter	Free	Obligation to buy in the end of 2022–23 season for €2M if not relegated	
47	FW	(Mauritania) (France)	Aboubakar Kamara	27	(Greece) Aris	Loan	Winter	Free	Obligation to buy in the end of 2022–23 season for €2.5M	
16	DF	(Israel) (Romania)	Doron Leidner	20	Austria Wien	Loan	Winter	Free		
20	MF	(England)	Josh Bowler	23	(England) Nottingham Forest	End of Loan	Winter	Free		
18	FW	(South Korea)	Hwang Ui-jo	30	(England) Nottingham Forest	End of Loan	Winter	Free		
30	MF	(United States)	Konrad de la Fuente	21	(France) Marseille	End of Loan	Winter	Free		
26	DF	(Spain)	Gonzalo Ávila	24	(Bulgaria) Ludogorets Razgrad	Transfer	Winter	€600k		
1	GK	(Czech Republic)	Tomáš Vaclík	33	(England) Huddersfield; Town	Transfer	Winter	Undisclosed		
5	MF	(Greece)	Andreas Bouchalakis	29	(Turkey) Konyaspor	Loan	Winter	Free		
22	MF	(Guinea)	Aguibou Camara	21	(Greece) Atromitos	Loan	Winter	Free		
12	DF	(Brazil) (Spain)	Marcelo	34	(Brazil) Fluminense	Released	Winter	Free		
10	MF	(Colombia) (Spain)	James Rodríguez	31		Released		Free		

▲ Total Income: €7.4M

Net Income: ▼€10.45M

== Friendlies ==
Win Draw Loss

24 June 2022	Ried	2–0	Olympiacos	Peuerbach, Austria
19:00 EEST	Monschein 55' (pen.); Nutz 68'; Stošić (yellow card) 88'		Cissé (yellow card) 88'	Stadium: Guntamatic Arena

25 June 2022	Fortuna Düsseldorf	1–2	Olympiacos	Peuerbach, Austria
19:00 EEST	Peterson 23'		Cissé 28'; Hassan 62'; Keita (yellow card) 89'	Stadium: Automobile Pühringer Arena

27 June 2022	Olympiacos	0–0	Cracovia	Andorf, Austria
19:00 EEST				Stadium: DAXL-Arena

29 June 2022	Slavia Prague	1–1	Olympiacos	Wels, Austria
19:00 EEST	Hromada (yellow card) 14'; Ousou 43'		Reabciuk 34'	Stadium: Huber Arena

1 July 2022	Arminia Bielefeld	3–1	Olympiacos	Saalfelden, Austria
16:30 EEST	Klos 7'; Rzatkowski 23'; Hack 88'		Tiquinho 35'; Androutsos (yellow card) 14'	Stadium: Saalfelden Arena

2 July 2022	Red Bull Salzburg	3–1	Olympiacos	Mittersill, Austria
16:30 EEST	Šimić 22'; Kameri 41'; Bernardo 80'		El-Arabi 14'; Hassan (yellow card) 90'	Stadium: Waldstadion

9 July 2022	Olympiacos	1–0	AZ Alkmaar	Piraeus, Greece
20:30 EEST	Cissé 45'			Stadium: Karaiskakis Stadium

11 July 2022	Aris	2–1	Olympiacos	Thessaloniki, Greece
21:00 EEST	Camacho 74'; Chatziioannou 75'		Tiquinho 80'	Stadium: Kleanthis Vikelidis Stadium

1 December 2022 Winter Prep Estepona 2022	Olympiacos	2–0	Huddersfield Town	Estepona, Spain
17:00 EET	Fortounis 39'; El-Arabi 72'	Report

4 December 2022 Winter Prep Estepona 2022	Olympiacos	3–3	Standard Liège	Estepona, Spain
16:00 EET	El-Arabi 58', 76'; Bakambu 74'	Report	Davida 19'; Ohio 64', 90'

10 December 2022	Olympiacos	1–0	Nottingham Forest	Piraeus, Greece
19:00 EET	Kasami 39'	Report		Stadium: Karaiskakis Stadium

== Competitions ==
=== Overview ===
Competition	Starting round	Final position	Record							
Competition	Starting round	Final position	Pld	W	D	L	GF	GA	GD	Win %
Super League Greece	Matchday 1	3rd	36	21	10	5	70	24	+46	58.33
Greek Football Cup	Round of 16	Semi finals	6	4	1	1	10	7	+3	66.67
UEFA Champions League	Second qualifying round	Second qualifying round	2	0	1	1	1	5	−4	0.00
UEFA Europa League	Third qualifying round	Group stage	10	0	6	4	7	16	−9	0.00
Total			54	25	18	11	88	52	+36	46.30

Last updated: 15 May 2023
Source: Competitions

=== Super League Greece ===
==== League table ====
Pos	Team	Pld	W	D	L	GF	GA	GD	Pts	Qualification or relegation
1	Panathinaikos	26	19	4	3	38	12	+26	61	Qualification for the Play-off round
2	AEK Athens	26	19	2	5	51	14	+37	59	Qualification for the Play-off round
3	Olympiacos	26	16	8	2	53	14	+39	56	Qualification for the Play-off round
4	PAOK	26	15	9	2	43	15	+28	54	Qualification for the Play-off round
5	Aris	26	12	4	10	38	24	+14	40	Qualification for the Play-off round

Source: Super League Greece
Rules for classification: 1) Points; 2) Head-to-head points; 3) Head-to-head goal difference; 4) Goal difference; 5) Goals scored; 6) Play-offs (neutral ground).
(Note: Criterion 6 is only used if needed to decide champion, teams for relegation or teams for UEFA competitions).

==== Results summary ====
Overall								Home						Away					
Pld	W	D	L	GF	GA	GD	Pts	W	D	L	GF	GA	GD	W	D	L	GF	GA	GD
26	16	8	2	53	14	+39	56	9	3	1	31	6	+25	7	5	1	22	8	+14

Source: Super League Greece

==== Results by matchday ====
Matchday	1	2	3	4	5	6	7	8	9	10	11	12	13	14	15	16	17	18	19	20	21	22	23	24	25	26
Ground	H	A	H	H	A	H	A	H	A	H	A	A	H	A	H	A	A	H	A	H	A	H	A	H	H	A
Result	W	D	W	D	L	W	W	L	W	W	D	W	D	D	W	W	W	W	D	W	D	W	W	D	W	W
Position	4	3	2	3	6	3	3	4	4	3	3	4	3	4	4	4	4	3	4	4	4	3	3	3	3	3

Source: Super League Greece
A = Away; H = Home; W = Win; D = Draw; L = Loss

==== Regular season matches ====
Win Draw Loss

21 August 2022 1	Olympiacos	2–0	PAS Giannina	Piraeus
22:00 EEST	Valbuena 57'; Ranđelović 74'	Report		Stadium: Karaiskakis Stadium; Attendance: 9,523; Referee: Vangelis Manouchos

29 August 2022 2	Asteras Tripolis	0–0	Olympiacos	Tripoli
19:00 EEST	Gardawski (yellow card) 44'; Castaño (yellow card) 46'; Léo Tilica (yellow card) 57'; Barrales (yellow card) 75'	Report	Valbuena (yellow card) 68'	Stadium: Theodoros Kolokotronis Stadium; Attendance: 1,229; Referee: Dimitris Karantonis

3 September 2022 3	Olympiacos	3–1	Ionikos	Piraeus
19:00 EEST	Bouchalakis 17'; Biel 45'; El-Arabi 90' (pen.)	Report	Mendoza 49'; Valerianos (yellow card) 90'	Stadium: Karaiskakis Stadium; Attendance: 15,065; Referee: Aristotelis Diamantopoulos

11 September 2022 4	Olympiacos	1–1	Volos	Piraeus
18:30 EEST	Vrsaljko (yellow card) 41'; Reabciuk (yellow card) 47'; Kunde (yellow card) 60'; El-Arabi 76'; Ba (yellow card) 81'	Report	Ožegović 28'; Tsokanis (yellow card) 53'	Stadium: Karaiskakis Stadium; Attendance: 17,017; Referee: Vasilis Fotias

18 September 2022 5	Aris	2–1	Olympiacos	Thessaloniki
21:30 EEST	Mazikou (yellow card) 45'; Mancini 76', (yellow card) 83'; Palma 80'; Dabo (yellow card) 87'	Report	Masouras 15'	Stadium: Kleanthis Vikelidis Stadium; Attendance: 9,589; Referee: Tamás Bognár (Hungary)

2 October 2022 6	Olympiacos	2–0	Atromitos	Piraeus
16:00 EEST	Bakambu 45' (pen.), 68'; Masouras (yellow card) 52'	Report	Kivrakidis (yellow card) 45'; González (yellow card) 51'; Muñiz (yellow card) 51'; Robail (yellow card) 90'	Stadium: Karaiskakis Stadium; Attendance: 19,825; Referee: Giorgos Tzovaras

9 October 2022 7	OFI	1–2	Olympiacos	Heraklion
16:00 EEST	Ntoi 40' (o.g.); Larsson (yellow card) 45'; Balogiannis (yellow card) 74'; Marinakis (yellow card) 84'	Report	Ntoi (yellow card) 45'; Rodrigues 58'; Bakambu 81'	Stadium: Theodoros Vardinogiannis Stadium; Attendance: 5,100; Referee: Aristotelis Diamantopoulos

17 October 2022 8	Olympiacos	1–2	PAOK	Piraeus
20:00 EEST	Rodríguez 37'	Report	Papastathopoulos 8' (o.g.); El Kaddouri (yellow card) 39'; Douglas Augusto (yellow card) 55'; Narey 56'; Dantas (yellow card) 89'; Kotarski (yellow card) 90'; Schwab (yellow card) 90'	Stadium: Karaiskakis Stadium; Attendance: 25,100; Referee: Andris Treimanis (Latvia)

22 October 2022 9	Panetolikos	0–2	Olympiacos	Agrinio
19:30 EEST		Report	Biel 50'; Valbuena 82'	Stadium: Panetolikos Stadium; Attendance: 3,288; Referee: Andreas Gamaris

30 October 2022 10	Olympiacos	2–0	Lamia	Piraeus
16:00 EEST	Biel (yellow card) 17'; Rodríguez 22'; Bakambu 28'	Report	Slivka (yellow card) 11'	Stadium: Karaiskakis Stadium; Attendance: 17,024; Referee: Vangelis Manouchos

6 November 2022 11	Panathinaikos	1–1	Olympiacos	Athens
19:30 EET	Bernard (yellow card) 51'; Pérez (yellow card) 57'; Juankar (yellow card) 90'; Šporar 90'; Schenkeveld (yellow card) 90'	Report	Bakambu (yellow card) 34'; Hwang I. (yellow card) 51'; Biel 84'; Ávila (yellow card) 90'; Papastathopoulos (yellow card) 90'; Vrousai (yellow card) 90'; M'Vila (yellow card) 90'	Stadium: Leoforos Alexandras Stadium; Attendance: 13,907; Referee: Jakob Kehlet (Denmark)

9 November 2022 12	Levadiakos	0–1	Olympiacos	Livadeia
20:00 EET	Tsapras (yellow card) 63'	Report	Androutsos 40'; Vrousai (yellow card) 48'	Stadium: Levadia Municipal Stadium; Attendance: 3.669; Referee: Giannis Papadopoulos

13 November 2022 13	Olympiacos	0–0	AEK	Piraeus
19:30 EET	Reabciuk (yellow card) 79'; Papastathopoulos (yellow card) 90'; M'Vila (yellow card) 90'	Report	Ambrabat (yellow card) 40'; Moukoudi (yellow card) 72'; Araujo (yellow card) 86'	Stadium: Karaiskakis Stadium; Attendance: 31.717; Referee: Glenn Nyberg (Sweden)

21 December 2022 14	PAS Giannina	2–2	Olympiacos	Ioannina
19:30 TBC EET	Pilios (yellow card) 35'; Pamlidis 64'; Liasos 76'; Soulis (yellow card) 90'; Moreira (yellow card) 90'	Report	Fortounis 33'; Fortounis 45'; Ntoi (yellow card) 50'	Stadium: Zosimades Stadium; Attendance: 4.108; Referee: Stefanos Koubarakis

28 December 2022 15	Olympiacos	5–0	Asteras Tripolis	Piraeus
18:00 TBC EET	Biel 4'; Rodríguez 35'; Androutsos (yellow card) 49'; Bakambu 68'; M'Vila (yellow card) 78'; Rodrigues 84'; Samassékou (yellow card) 86'; Masouras 90+1'	Report	Carmona (yellow card) 50'; Crespi (yellow card) 71'	Stadium: Karaiskakis Stadium; Attendance: 17.500; Referee: Konstantinos Perrakis

3 January 2023 16	Ionikos	0–2	Olympiacos	Nikaia
21:00 TBC EET	Aosman (yellow card) 61'	Report	Reabciuk (yellow card) 21' Bakambu 34' Fortounis 40' Rodríguez (yellow card) 77'	Stadium: Neapolis Public Stadium; Attendance: 1.108; Referee: Aristotelis Diamantopoulos

8 January 2023 17	Volos	0–4	Olympiacos	Volos
16:00 TBC EET	Deletic (yellow card) 37'; Barrientos (yellow card) 81'	Report	Biel 7' In-beom 22' Bakambu 45' El-Arabi 75'	Stadium: Panthessaliko Stadium; Attendance: 10.582; Referee: Anastasios Papapetrou

15 January 2023 18	Olympiacos	1–0	Aris	Piraeus
19:30 TBC EET	In-beom (yellow card) 37'; Masouras 46'; Reabciuk (yellow card) 90'	Report	Dabo (yellow card) 37'; Odubajo; (yellow card) 37': Fabiano (yellow card) 90'	Stadium: Karaiskakis Stadium; Attendance: 24.753; Referee: Roi Reinshreiber (Israel)

22 January 2023 19	Atromitos	1–1	Olympiacos	Peristeri
20:30 TBC EET	Friðjónsson 64' De Bock (yellow card) 68'	Report	Bakambu; 54' Bakambu (yellow card) 59': Rodinei; (yellow card) 67': Masouras (yellow card) 76'	Stadium: Peristeri Stadium; Attendance: 1.909; Referee: Vangelis Manouchos

29 January 2023 20	Olympiacos	2–1	OFI	Piraeus
16:00 EET	Bakambu 39' El-Arabi 76' M'Vila (yellow card) 90'	Report	Dicko 19' Pasalidis (yellow card) 42' Dioussé (yellow card) 61' Balogiannis (yellow card) 79' Tsilianidis (yellow card) 86'	Stadium: Karaiskakis Stadium; Attendance: 18.850; Referee: Ioannis Papadopoulos

5 February 2023 21	PAOK	0–0	Olympiacos	Thessaloniki
20:30 TBC EET	Augusto (yellow card) 45' Sastre (yellow card) 78' Soares (yellow card) 90+2'	Report	Sokratis (yellow card) 69' Rodinei (yellow card) 82'	Stadium: Toumba Stadium; Attendance: 23,585; Referee: Ivan Kružliak (Slovakia)

13 February 2023 22	Olympiacos	6–1	Panetolikos	Piraeus
21:00 TBC EET	Bakambu 9' Papastathopoulos 45' Rodriguez 61', 75' Canos 67', (yellow card) 68' Valbuena 90'	Report	Morsay (yellow card) 42' Liavas (yellow card) 45+3' Karelis 50'	Stadium: Karaiskakis Stadium; Attendance: 12.578; Referee: Efstathios Gortsilas

19 February 2023 23	Lamia	0–3	Olympiacos	Lamia
16:00 TBC EET	Martinez (yellow card) 44' De Vincenti (yellow card) 69'		Samassékou 44' Biel (yellow card) 51' Bakambu 60' Papastathopoulos (yellow card) 63' Bakambu (yellow card) 77' Biel 86' Rodinei (yellow card) 90+2'	Stadium: Athanasios Diakos Stadium; Attendance: 1.870; Referee: Konstantinos Katoikos

25 February 2023 24	Olympiacos	0–0	Panathinaikos	Piraeus
20:30 TBC EET	Hwang I. (yellow card) 61' Papastathopoulos (yellow card) 64' Vrousai (yellow card) 90+1' Papastathopoulos (yellow card) 90+9' Rodinei (yellow card) 90+14'		Brignoli (yellow card) 56' Perez (yellow card) 74' Puchacz (yellow card) 90+7'	Stadium: Karaiskakis Stadium; Attendance: 31.487; Referee: João Pinheiro (Portugal)

5 March 2023 25	Olympiacos	6–0	Levadiakos	Piraeus
16:00 TBC EET	Biel 2' Masouras (yellow card) 28' Hwang I. 38' Androutsos (yellow card) 48' Biel 49' Bakambu 58' Canos 86' Canos 88'		Hammond (yellow card) 64' Paz (yellow card) 84'	Stadium: Karaiskakis Stadium; Attendance: 15.500; Referee: Konstantinos Perrakis

12 March 2023 26	AEK	1–3	Olympiacos	Nea Filadelfeia
19:00 TBC EET	Ambrabat (yellow card) 60' Zuber 81' Vida (yellow card) 88' Zuber (yellow card) 90+5'		Biel (yellow card) 6' Ba (yellow card) 45+2' Moukoudi 50' (o.g.) Bakambu 53' Fortounis (yellow card) 58' Hwang I. (yellow card) 62' Canos 67' Biel (yellow card) 70' El-Arabi (yellow card) 88'	Stadium: Agia Sophia Stadium; Attendance: 31.100; Referee: Maurizio Mariani (Italy)

==== Play-off round ====
Pos	Team	Pld	W	D	L	GF	GA	GD	Pts	Qualification
1	AEK Athens (C)	36	26	5	5	69	17	+52	83	Qualification for the Champions League third qualifying round
2	Panathinaikos	36	23	9	4	47	16	+31	78	Qualification for the Champions League second qualifying round
3	Olympiacos	36	21	10	5	70	24	+46	73	Qualification for the Europa League third qualifying round
4	PAOK	36	19	10	7	57	32	+25	67	Qualification for the Europa Conference League second qualifying round
5	Aris	36	15	6	15	55	41	+14	51	Qualification for the Europa Conference League second qualifying round
6	Volos	36	11	7	18	35	66	−31	40	

Source: Super League Greece
Rules for classification: 1) Points; 2) Head-to-head points (Regular season and play-off); 3) Head-to-head goal difference (Regular season and play-off); 4) Regular season position.
(C) Champions

==== Results summary ====
Overall								Home						Away					
Pld	W	D	L	GF	GA	GD	Pts	W	D	L	GF	GA	GD	W	D	L	GF	GA	GD
10	5	2	3	17	10	+7	17	3	1	1	12	6	+6	2	1	2	5	4	+1

Source: Super League Greece

==== Results by matchday ====
Matchday	1	2	3	4	5	6	7	8	9	10
Ground	A	H	H	A	H	H	A	A	H	A
Result	W	D	W	L	L	L	W	D	W	W
Position	3	3	3	3	3	3	3	3	3	3

Source: Super League Greece
A = Away; H = Home; W = Win; D = Draw; L = Loss

==== Play-off matches ====
Win Draw Loss

19 March 2023 1	Volos	0–3	Olympiacos	Volos
16:30 EET		Report	Kasami 7'; Bakambu 36'; Fortounis 81'	Stadium: Panthessaliko Stadium; Attendance: 14,495; Referee: Aristotelis Diamantopoulos

2 April 2023 2	Olympiacos	2–2	Aris	Piraeus
21:00 EEST	In-beom 36'; Papastathopoulos 52'	Report	Iturbe 70'; Camacho 81'	Stadium: Karaiskakis Stadium; Attendance: 20,926; Referee: Fábio Veríssimo

5 April 2023 3	Olympiacos	3–1	PAOK	Piraeus
21:00 EEST	Bakambu 59'; Masouras 78'; El-Arabi 87' (pen.)	Report	Brandon 22'	Stadium: Karaiskakis Stadium; Attendance: 25,016; Referee: François Letexier (France)

9 April 2023 4	Panathinaikos	2–0	Olympiacos	Athens
21:00 EEST	Šporar 28'; El-Arabi 36' (o.g.)	Report		Stadium: Leoforos Alexandras Stadium; Attendance: 14,182; Referee: Carlos del Cerro Grande (Spain)

23 April 2023 5	Olympiacos	1–3	AEK	Piraeus
21:00 EEST	Bakambu 51'	Report	Gaćinović 7'; García 82' (pen.); Mantalos 90+1'	Stadium: Karaiskakis Stadium; Attendance: 25,015; Referee: Davide Massa (Italy)

26 April 2023 6	Aris	2–1	Olympiacos	Thessaloniki
21:00 EEST	Palma 36'; Dabo 65'	Report	Bakambu 70' (pen.)	Stadium: Kleanthis Vikelidis Stadium; Referee: Danny Makkelie (Netherlands)

30 April 2023 7	Olympiacos	5–0	Volos	Piraeus
20:00 EEST	Ntoi 19'; Kasami 25'; Biel 45'; Bakambu 61'; El-Arabi 69'	Report		Stadium: Karaiskakis Stadium; Attendance: 10,047; Referee: Konstantinos Perrakis

3 May 2023 8	AEK	0–0	Olympiacos	Nea Filadelfeia
20:00 EEST		Report		Stadium: Agia Sophia Stadium; Attendance: 31,100; Referee: Jérôme Brisard (France)

8 May 2023 9	Olympiacos	1–0	Panathinaikos	Piraeus
20:00 EEST	Reabciuk 68'	Report		Stadium: Karaiskakis Stadium; Attendance: 0 Referee: Felix Brych (Germany)

14 May 2023 10	PAOK	0–1	Olympiacos	Thessaloniki
19:00 EEST		Report	Samassékou 33'	Stadium: Toumba Stadium; Referee: Angelos Evangelou

=== Greek Football Cup ===
Win Draw Loss

==== Round of 16 ====
15 December 2022	Olympiacos	4–1	Atromitos	Piraeus
19:30 EET	Biel 7'; Marcelo 50', 65'; El-Arabi 63'		Kjartansson 11'	Stadium: Karaiskakis Stadium; Referee: Vassilis Fotias (Pieria)

11 January 2023	Atromitos	2–2	Olympiacos	Athens
21:00 EET	Tzovaras 8'; Kotsopoulos 51'		Cissé 38'; Marcelo 45+1'	Stadium: Peristeri Stadium; Referee: Giorgos Tzovaras (Pthiotis)

Olympiacos won 6–3 on aggregate.

==== Quarter-finals ====
18 January 2023	Olympiacos	1–0	Aris	Piraeus
19:00 EET	Rodrigues 30'			Stadium: Karaiskakis Stadium; Referee: Tiago Martins (Portugal)

25 January 2023	Aris	0–1	Olympiacos	Thessaloniki
19:30 EET			El-Arabi 88'	Stadium: Kleanthis Vikelidis Stadium; Referee: István Vad (Hungary)

Olympiacos won 2–0 on aggregate.

==== Semi-finals ====
9 February 2023	AEK Athens	3–0	Olympiacos	Athens
20:30 EET	García 3', 90+12' (pen.); Samassékou 27' (o.g.)			Stadium: Agia Sophia Stadium; Referee: Nikola Dabanović (Montenegro)

12 April 2023 Second leg	Olympiacos	2–1 (2–4 agg.)	AEK Athens	Piraeus
19:30 EEST (UTC+3)	Valbuena 27'; Hwang 57'	Report	Ba 52' (o.g.)	Stadium: Karaiskakis Stadium; Referee: Aliyar Aghayev (Azerbaijan)

=== UEFA Champions League ===
Win Draw Loss

==== Second qualifying round ====
20 July 2022 First leg	Maccabi Haifa (Israel)	1–1	(Greece) Olympiacos	Haifa, Israel
20:15 EEST	Atzili (yellow card) 8'; Sundgren (yellow card) 18'; Abu Fani (yellow card) 68'; Haziza 90', (yellow card) 90'	Report	Zinckernagel 7', (yellow card) 18'; Masouras (yellow card) 35'; Vrsaljko (yellow card) 43'; Kané (yellow card) 84'; M. Camara (yellow card) 87'	Stadium: Sammy Ofer Stadium; Attendance: 29,654; Referee: Sascha Stegemann (Germany)

27 July 2022 Second leg	Olympiacos (Greece)	0–4 (1–5 agg.)	(Israel) Maccabi Haifa	Piraeus, Greece
22:00 EEST	Tiquinho (yellow card) 26'; Cissé (yellow card) 26'; Reabciuk (yellow card) 32'; Kané (yellow card) 57'	Report	Chery 5'; Haziza (yellow card) 26'; Planić (yellow card) 45'; Mohamed (yellow card) 55'; Pierrot 61', 65'; Abu Fani 87'; Cohen (yellow card) 90'	Stadium: Karaiskakis Stadium; Attendance: 21,705; Referee: Daniel Stefański (Poland)

=== UEFA Europa League ===
Win Draw Loss

==== Third qualifying round ====
4 August 2022 First leg	Olympiacos (Greece)	1–1	(Slovakia) Slovan Bratislava	Piraeus, Greece
22:00 EEST	M'Vila (yellow card) 58'; Masouras (yellow card) 69'; El-Arabi 87'	Report	Green 63'; Kashia (yellow card) 73'	Stadium: Karaiskakis Stadium; Attendance: 15,585; Referee: Lawrence Visser (Belgium)

11 August 2022 Second leg	Slovan Bratislava (Slovakia)	2–2 (a.e.t.) (3–3 agg.) (3–4 p)	(Greece) Olympiacos	Bratislava, Slovakia
21:30 EEST	Green (yellow card) 66', (goal) 108'; Abena (yellow card) 66' (yellow-red card) 90'; Kucka (yellow card) 90'; Šaponjić 90'	Report	Zinckernagel 54'; Kunde (yellow card) 66'; Cissé (yellow card) 67'; A. Camara 101'; Vaclík (yellow card) 105'; Manolas (yellow card) 115'	Stadium: Tehelné pole Attendance: 18,133; Referee: Glenn Nyberg (Sweden)
	Penalties
	Ramírez (penalty scored); Šaponjić (penalty scored); Kucka (penalty missed); Green (penalty scored); Chakvetadze (penalty missed)		(penalty missed) Kunde; (penalty scored) Bouchalakis; (penalty scored) Masouras; (penalty scored) Ávila; (penalty scored) Valbuena

==== Play-off round ====
18 August 2022 First leg	Apollon Limassol (Cyprus)	1–1	(Greece) Olympiacos	Limassol, Cyprus
20:00 EEST	Janga 18'	Report	Hwang I. 29'; Hassan (yellow card) 83'; de la Fuente (yellow card) 90'	Stadium: Tsirio Stadium; Attendance: 10,479; Referee: José María Sánchez Martínez (Spain)

25 August 2022 Second leg	Olympiacos (Greece)	1–1 (a.e.t.) (2–2 agg.) (3–1 p)	(Cyprus) Apollon Limassol	Piraeus, Greece
22:00 EEST	Masouras 2', (yellow card) 45'; Ba (yellow card) 64' (yellow-red card) 100'; Reabciuk (yellow card) 87'; Α. Camara (yellow card) 112'	Report	Peybernes (yellow card) 87'; Pittas 90'; Ba (yellow card) 103'; Roberge (yellow card) 109'	Stadium: Karaiskakis Stadium; Attendance: 20,054; Referee: Sandro Schärer (Switzerland)
	Penalties
	M'Vila (penalty scored); de la Fuente (penalty scored); Ávila (penalty scored); Ranđelović (penalty missed)		(penalty missed) Kyriakou; (penalty scored) Pittas; (penalty missed) Ongenda; (penalty missed) Ba

==== Group stage ====
Pos	Team	Pld	W	D	L	GF	GA	GD	Pts	Qualification	FRE	NAN	QRB	OLY
1	(Germany) SC Freiburg	6	4	2	0	13	3	+10	14	Advance to round of 16	—	2–0	2–1	1–1
2	(France) Nantes	6	3	0	3	6	11	−5	9	Advance to knockout round play-offs	0–4	—	2–1	2–1
3	(Azerbaijan) Qarabağ	6	2	2	2	9	5	+4	8	Transfer to Europa Conference League	1–1	3–0	—	0–0
4	(Greece) Olympiacos	6	0	2	4	2	11	−9	2		0–3	0–2	0–3	—

Source: UEFA
Rules for classification: Group stage tiebreakers

8 September 2022 1	Nantes (France)	2–1	(Greece) Olympiacos	Nantes, France
22:00 EEST	Mohamed 32'; Sissoko (yellow card) 72'; Pallois (yellow card) 85'; Blas (yellow card) 90'; Guessand 90'	Report	Moutoussamy 50' (o.g.); Retsos (yellow card) 56'; Reabciuk (yellow card) 90'	Stadium: Stade de la Beaujoire; Attendance: 31,276; Referee: Harald Lechner (Austria)

15 September 2022 2	Olympiacos (Greece)	0–3	(Germany) Freiburg	Piraeus, Greece
19:45 EEST	Rodrigues (yellow card) 77'	Report	Höfler 5', (yellow card) 80'; Gregoritsch 25', 52'; Lienhart (yellow card) 60'	Stadium: Karaiskakis Stadium; Attendance: 23,104; Referee: Matej Jug (Slovenia)

6 October 2022 3	Olympiacos (Greece)	0–3	(Azerbaijan) Qarabağ	Piraeus, Greece
19:45 EEST	Valbuena (yellow card) 88'	Report	Cafarguliyev (yellow card) 34'; Owusu 68'; Vešović 82'; Sheydayev 86', (yellow card) 87'; Qarayev (yellow card) 88'	Stadium: Karaiskakis Stadium; Attendance: 21,677; Referee: Irfan Peljto (Bosnia and Herzegovina)

13 October 2022 4	Qarabağ (Azerbaijan)	0–0	(Greece) Olympiacos	Baku, Azerbaijan
19:45 EEST	Almeida (yellow card) 66'; Romão (yellow card) 83'; Vešović (yellow card) 88'	Report	Vrsaljko (yellow card) 40'; Papastathopoulos (yellow card) 83'	Stadium: Tofiq Bahramov Republican Stadium; Attendance: 31,200; Referee: Craig Pawson (England)

27 October 2022 5	Freiburg (Germany)	1–1	(Greece) Olympiacos	Freiburg im Breisgau, Germany
21:00 EEST	Kübler 90'; Ginter (yellow card) 90'	Report	El-Arabi 17', (yellow card) 82'; M'Vila (yellow card) 28'; Masouras (yellow card) 80'; Paschalakis (yellow card) 90'; Kunde (yellow card) 90'; Ba (yellow card) 90' (yellow-red card) 90'; Retsos (yellow card) 90'	Stadium: Europa-Park Stadion; Attendance: 33,600; Referee: Kristo Tohver (Estonia)

3 November 2022 6	Olympiacos (Greece)	0–2	(France) Nantes	Piraeus, Greece
19:45 EEST	Retsos (yellow card) 90'	Report	Castelletto (yellow card) 49'; Moutoussamy (yellow card) 68'; Mohamed 79'; Blas 90'	Stadium: Karaiskakis Stadium; Attendance: 16,254; Referee: Serhiy Boyko (Ukraine)

== Squad statistics ==
=== Goalscorers & Assists ===
As of match played 15 May 2023

No.	Pos.	Nat.	Name	Greek Super League		Greek Cup		UEFA Champions League		UEFA Europa League		Total		
No.	Pos.	Nat.	Name	Goals	Assists	Goals	Assists	Goals	Assists	Goals	Assists	Goals	Assists	G+A
94	FW	(Democratic Republic of the Congo)	Cédric Bakambu	18	2	0	1	0	0	0	0	18	3	21
11	FW	(Morocco)	Youssef El-Arabi	6	5	2	0	0	0	2	0	10	5	15
21	MF	(Spain)	Pep Biel	9	3	1	1	0	0	0	0	10	4	14
10	MF	(Colombia)	James Rodríguez	5	6	0	0	0	0	0	0	5	6	11
33	MF	(South Korea)	Hwang In-beom	3	4	1	0	0	0	1	0	5	4	9
19	MF	(Greece)	Georgios Masouras	4	2	0	0	0	0	1	2	5	4	9
7	MF	(Greece)	Kostas Fortounis	4	9	0	1	0	0	0	0	4	10	14
28	MF	(France)	Mathieu Valbuena	3	3	1	0	0	0	0	1	4	4	8
47	MF	(Spain)	Sergi Canós	4	3	0	0	0	0	0	0	4	3	7
77	MF	(Cape Verde)	Garry Rodrigues	2	1	1	0	0	0	0	0	3	1	4
12	DF	(Brazil)	Marcelo	0	0	3	0	0	0	0	0	3	0	3
38	MF	(Mali)	Diadie Samassékou	2	0	0	1	0	0	0	0	2	1	3
27	MF	(Switzerland)	Pajtim Kasami	2	0	0	1	0	0	0	0	2	1	3
15	DF	(Greece)	Sokratis Papastathopoulos	2	0	0	0	0	0	0	0	2	0	2
10	MF	(Denmark)	Philip Zinckernagel	0	0	0	0	1	0	1	0	2	0	2
45	DF	(Moldova)	Oleg Reabciuk	1	4	0	0	0	0	0	2	1	6	7
74	DF	(Greece)	Andreas Ntoi	1	1	0	0	0	0	0	0	1	1	2
14	DF	(Greece)	Thanasis Androutsos	1	1	0	1	0	0	0	0	1	2	3
5	MF	(Greece)	Andreas Bouchalakis	1	0	0	1	0	0	0	0	1	1	2
97	MF	(Serbia)	Lazar Ranđelović	1	1	0	0	0	0	0	0	1	1	2
22	MF	(Guinea)	Aguibou Camara	0	0	0	0	0	0	1	0	1	0	1
66	DF	(Senegal)	Pape Abou Cissé	0	0	1	0	0	0	0	0	1	0	1
23	DF	(Brazil)	Rodinei	0	3	0	0	0	0	0	0	0	3	3
6	MF	(France)	Yann M'Vila	0	1	0	1	0	0	0	0	0	2	2
26	DF	(Spain)	Gonzalo Ávila	0	1	0	0	0	0	0	0	0	1	1
2	DF	(Brazil)	Ramon	0	1	0	0	0	0	0	0	0	1	1
18	FW	(South Korea)	Hwang Ui-jo	0	1	0	0	0	0	0	0	0	1	1
29	FW	(Brazil)	Tiquinho	0	0	0	0	0	1	0	0	0	1	1

Own Goals: 2

== Individual awards ==
Name	Pos.	Award
(Democratic Republic of the Congo) Cédric Bakambu	Forward	Super League Greece Golden Boot; Super League Greece Team of the Season; Super League Greece Player of the Month January 2023
(Brazil) Rodinei	Right back	Super League Greece Team of the Season
(South Korea) Hwang In-beom	Central Midfielder	Olympiacos Player of the Season; Super League Greece Player of the Month February 2023
(Spain) Pep Biel	Attacking Midfielder	Super League Greece Player of the Month August 2022
(Colombia) James Rodríguez	Attacking Midfielder	Super League Greece Player of the Month October 2022
(Greece) Konstantinos Tzolakis	Goalkeeper	Super League Greece Player of the Month May 2023
(Guinea) Algassime Bah	Forward	Super League Greece 2 Young Player of the Season
