= 2021–22 Olympiacos F.C. season =

Olympiacos
2021–22 season
- Owner: Evangelos Marinakis
- President: Evangelos Marinakis
- Manager: Pedro Martins
- Stadium: Karaiskakis Stadium
- Super League Greece: 1st
- Greek Cup: Semi-finals
- Champions League: Third qualifying round
- Europa League: Knockout round play-offs
- Top goalscorer: League: Youssef El-Arabi (16); All: Youssef El-Arabi (23)
- Highest home attendance: 25,000
- Biggest win: Olympiacos 5–1 Asteras Tripolis
- Biggest defeat: Olympiacos 0–3 Atalanta
Home colours	Away colours	Third colours

The 2021–22 season was the 97th season in existence of Olympiacos and the club's 63rd consecutive season in the top flight of Greek football. Olympiacos participated in the Greek Super League winning their 47th title (3rd in a row), finishing 19 points ahead of PAOK who came second. Olympiacos also participated in this season's Greek Cup, UEFA Champions League and UEFA Europa League. During the season Pedro Martins became the longest-serving Piraeus coach in a single term. The season covers the period from July 2021 to late May 2022.

== Players ==
=== First team ===
As of 31 January 2022

Squad No.	Name	Nationality	Position(s)	Place of birth	Date of birth (Age)	Previous club
Goalkeepers
1	Tomáš Vaclík	(Czech Republic)	GK	Ostrava, Czechoslovakia	29 March 1989 (age 32)	(Spain) Sevilla
31	Ögmundur Kristinsson	(Iceland)	GK	Reykjavík, Iceland	19 June 1989 (32)	(Greece) AEL
88	Konstantinos Tzolakis	(Greece)	GK	Chania, Greece	8 November 2002 (19)	(Greece) Olympiacos U19
Defenders
15	Sokratis Papastathopoulos	(Greece)	CB	Kalamata, Greece	9 June 1988 (33)	(England) Arsenal
24	Ousseynou Ba	(Senegal)	CB	Dakar, Senegal	11 November 1995 (26)	(France) Gazélec Ajaccio
25	Svetozar Marković	(Serbia) (Bosnia and Herzegovina)	CB	Bijeljina, Bosnia and Herzegovina	23 March 2000 (21)	(Serbia) Partizan
27	Kenny Lala	(France)	RB	Villepinte, France	3 October 1991 (30)	(France) Strasbourg
33	Michał Karbownik	(Poland)	LB/RB/CM	Radom, Poland	13 March 2001 (20)	(England) Brighton & Hove Albion
34	Avraam Papadopoulos	(Greece)	CB	Melbourne, Australia	3 December 1984 (37)	(Australia) Brisbane Roar
40	Kostas Manolas	(Greece)	CB	Naxos, Greece	14 June 1991 (30)	(Italy) Napoli
45	Oleg Reabciuk	(Moldova) (Portugal)	LB	Charneca de Caparica, Portugal	16 January 1998 (24)	(Portugal) Paços de Ferreira
66	Pape Abou Cissé	(Senegal)	CB	Pikine, Senegal	14 September 1995 (26)	(France) Ajaccio
Midfielders
4	Mady Camara	(Guinea)	CM	Matam, Guinea	28 February 1997 (24)	(France) Ajaccio
5	Andreas Bouchalakis	(Greece)	DM/CM	Heraklion, Greece	5 April 1993 (28)	(Greece) Ergotelis
6	Yann M'Vila	(France)	DM	Amiens, France	29 June 1993 (31)	(France) Saint-Étienne
7	Henry Onyekuru	(Nigeria)	LW/RW	Lagos, Nigeria	5 June 1997 (24)	(France) Monaco
8	Pierre Kunde	(Cameroon)	CM	Limbe, Cameroon	26 July 1995 (26)	(Germany) Mainz 05
10	Rony Lopes	(Portugal) (Brazil)	LW/RW/AM	Belém, Brazil	28 December 1995 (26)	(Spain) Sevilla
14	Thanasis Androutsos	(Greece)	RB/RW/AM	Athens, Greece	6 May 1997 (24)	(Greece) Olympiacos U19
17	Marios Vrousai	(Greece)	LW/RW	Nafpaktos, Greece	2 July 1998 (23)	(Greece) Olympiacos U19
19	Georgios Masouras	(Greece)	LW/RW	Kechrinia, Greece	1 January 1994 (28)	(Greece) Panionios
20	João Carvalho	(Portugal)	LW/AM	Castanheira de Pera, Portugal	9 March 1997 (24)	(England) Nottingham Forest
21	Bandiougou Fadiga	(France) (Mali)	CM/AM	Paris, France	15 January 2001 (21)	(France) Paris Saint-Germain
22	Aguibou Camara	(Guinea)	LW/AM	Conakry, Guinea	20 May 2001 (20)	(France) Lille
28	Mathieu Valbuena	(France)	LW/RW/AM	Bruges, France	28 September 1984 (37)	(Turkey) Fenerbahçe
36	Mamadou Kané	(Guinea)	DM/CM	Conakry, Guinea	22 January 1997 (25)	(Azerbaijan) Neftçi Baku
53	Kostas Fortounis	(Greece)	AM	Trikala, Greece	16 October 1992 (29)	(Germany) Kaiserslautern
77	Garry Rodrigues	(Cape Verde) (Netherlands)	LW/RW/AM	Rotterdam, Netherlands	27 November 1990 (31)	(Saudi Arabia) Al-Ittihad
Forwards
11	Youssef El-Arabi	(Morocco) (France)	FW	Caen, France	3 February 1987 (34)	(Qatar) Al-Duhail
29	Tiquinho	(Brazil) (Portugal)	FW	Sousa, Brazil	17 January 1991 (31)	(China) Tianjin TEDA

=== Out on loan ===
As of 31 January 2022

Name	Nationality	Position(s)	Date of birth (Age)	To Club	Notes
Adrian Galliani	(Italy) (United States)	LB/RB	28 April 2001 (20)	(Greece) Panionios	
Leonardo Koutris	(Greece) (Brazil)	LB	23 July 1995 (25)	(Germany) Fortuna Düsseldorf	On a 2-year loan deal ending July 2022
Giannis Masouras	(Greece)	RB	24 August 1996 (25)	(Netherlands) Sparta Rotterdam	
Rúben Semedo	(Portugal)	CB	4 April 1994 (27)	(Portugal) Porto	
Pêpê	(Portugal)	DM/CM	20 May 1997 (24)	(Portugal) Famalicão	
Nikola Čumić	(Serbia)	RW	20 November 1998 (23)	(Switzerland) Luzern	
Maximiliano Lovera	(Argentina)	LW/RW/AM	9 March 1999 (21)	(Cyprus) Omonoia Nicosia	
Alexandros Nikolias	(Greece)	LW/RW	23 July 1994 (27)	(Greece) AEL	On a 2+1-year loan deal ending July 2023
Lazar Ranđelović	(Serbia)	RW	5 August 1997 (24)	(Spain) Leganés	
Ahmed Hassan	(Egypt) (Portugal)	FW	5 March 1993 (28)	(Turkey) Konyaspor	Purchase option for the 2021-22 season

== Backroom staff ==
=== Coaching staff ===
Position	Staff
Sport director	(France) Christian Karembeu
Technical director	(Greece) Vasilis Torosidis
Head coach	(Portugal) Pedro Martins
Assistant coaches	(Portugal) Antonio Henriques
Assistant coaches	(Portugal) Rui Pedro Castro
Analysts	(Portugal) Luís Antero Lobo
Analysts	(Portugal) Fabio Miguel da Silva Ferreira
Analysts	(Greece) Giannis Vogiatzakis
Analysts	(Greece) Iosif Loukas
Fitness coach	(Greece) Christos Mourikis
Goalkeepers' trainer	(Greece) Panagiotis Agriogiannis
Rehabilitation trainer	(Greece) Kostas Liougkos
Medical team
Head doctor	(Greece) Christos Theos
Physios	(Greece) Nikos Lykouresis
Physios	(Greece) Giorgos Zouridakis
Physios	(Greece) Stavros Petrocheilos
Physios	(Greece) Anastasios Galazoulas
Physios	(Greece) Panagiotis Karamouzas
Nutritionist	(Portugal) Hernani Araujo Gomes
Scouts
Chief scout	(France) François Modesto
Scout	(Greece) Simos Havos
Scout	(Argentina) Chori Domínguez
Scout	(Argentina) Alejandro De Bartolo

== Transfers ==
=== In ===
No.	Pos.	Nat.	Name	Age	EU	Moving from	Type	Transfer window	Ends	Transfer fee	Source
29	FW	(Brazil)	Tiquinho	30	EU		Transfer	Summer	2024	Free	
66	DF	(Senegal)	Pape Abou Cissé	25	Non-EU	(France) Saint-Étienne	End of loan	Summer	2024		
20	MF	(Serbia)	Nikola Čumić	22	EU	(Spain) Sporting Gijón	End of loan	Summer	2024		
25	DF	(Serbia)	Svetozar Marković	21	EU	(Serbia) Partizan	End of loan	Summer	2024		
33	MF	(Portugal)	Pêpê	24	EU	(Portugal) Famalicão	End of loan	Summer	2024		
	DF	(Tunisia)	Yassine Meriah	28	Non-EU	(Turkey) Çaykur Rizespor	End of loan	Summer	2022		
	FW	(Greece)	Fiorin Durmishaj	24	EU	(Greece) AEL	End of loan	Summer	2022		
	DF	(Greece)	Giannis Masouras	25	EU	(Poland) Górnik Zabrze	End of loan	Summer	2023		
70	DF	(Bosnia and Herzegovina)	Nemanja Nikolić	20	EU	(Greece) Chania	End of loan	Summer	2023		(B team)
	DF	(Guinea)	Fodé Camara	23	Non-EU	(Greece) Chania	End of loan	Summer	2023		
	MF	(Mali)	Abdoulaye Keita	27	Non-EU	(France) Ajaccio	End of loan	Summer	2023		
26	MF	(Greece)	Giorgos Xenitidis	21	EU	(Luxembourg) Jeunesse Esch	End of loan	Summer	2022		(B team)
79	MF	(Cyprus)	Ioannis Kosti	21	EU	(Greece) Levadiakos	End of loan	Summer	2025		(B team)
	FW	(Argentina)	Franco Soldano	26	EU	(Argentina) Boca Juniors	End of loan	Summer	2023		
8	MF	(Cameroon)	Pierre Kunde	26	Non-EU	(Germany) Mainz 05	Transfer	Summer	2024	€1.8M	
1	GK	(Czech Republic)	Tomáš Vaclík	32	EU	(Spain) Sevilla	Transfer	Summer	2024	Free	
22	MF	(Guinea)	Aguibou Camara	20	Non-EU	(France) Lille	Transfer	Summer	2025	€121k	
12	FW	(Guinea)	Algassime Bah	19	Non-EU	(Guinea) Renaissance de Conakry	Transfer	Summer	2025	Free	(B team)
76	DF	(Italy)	Adrian Galliani	20	EU	(England) Nottingham Forest	Transfer	Summer	2022	Free	(B team)
7	MF	(Nigeria)	Henry Onyekuru	24	Non-EU	(France) Monaco	Transfer	Summer	2025	€5M	
10	MF	(Portugal)	Rony Lopes	25	EU	(Spain) Sevilla	Loan	Summer	2022	Free	
33	DF	(Poland)	Michał Karbownik	20	EU	(England) Brighton & Hove Albion	Loan	Summer	2022	Free	
97	FW	(Greece)	Dimitris Pinakas	20	EU	(Greece) AEL	Transfer	Summer	2025	€1.5M	(B team)
	MF	(Guinea)	Mamadou Kané	24	Non-EU	(Azerbaijan) Neftçi Baku	Transfer	Summer	2025	€300k	
2	DF	(France)	Étienne Youte Kinkoue	19	EU	(Italy) Inter	Transfer	Summer	2025	Free	(B team)
77	MF	(Cape Verde)	Garry Rodrigues	30	EU	(Saudi Arabia) Al-Ittihad	Transfer	Summer	2024	Free	
40	DF	(Greece)	Kostas Manolas	30	EU	(Italy) Napoli	Transfer	Winter	2025	€3.5M	
9	MF	(Argentina)	Maximiliano Lovera	22	Non-EU	(Argentina) Racing Club	End of loan	Winter	2024		
21	MF	(France)	Bandiougou Fadiga	20	EU	(France) Paris Saint-Germain	Transfer	Winter	2026	Free	
36	MF	(Guinea)	Mamadou Kané	25	Non-EU	(Azerbaijan) Neftçi Baku	End of loan	Winter	2025		
20	MF	(Portugal)	João Carvalho	24	EU	(England) Nottingham Forest	Transfer	Winter	2023	Free	
86	MF	(France)	Abdoulaye Dabo	20	EU	(France) Nantes	Transfer	Winter	2026	Free	(B team)
	MF	(Spain)	Diby Keita	18	EU	(Spain) Real Madrid	Transfer	Winter	2026	Free	(B team)
83	DF	(Montenegro)	Almir Klica	23	EU	(Luxembourg) Jeunesse Esch	Transfer	Winter	2024	Free	(B team)
58	MF	(Saudi Arabia)	Messari Al-Mashhari	20	Non-EU	(Saudi Arabia) Al Nassr	Transfer	Winter	Undisclosed	Free	(B team)
87	MF	(Saudi Arabia)	Mohammed Al-Qahtani	19	Non-EU	(Saudi Arabia) Abha Club	Transfer	Winter	2024	Free	(B team)
	FW	(Argentina)	Franco Soldano	27	EU	(Spain) Fuenlabrada	End of loan	Winter	2023		

▼ Total Spending: €12.22M

=== Out ===
No.	Pos.	Nat.	Name	Age	EU	Moving to	Type	Transfer window	Transfer fee	Source
	MF	(Portugal)	Bruma	26	EU	(Netherlands) PSV Eindhoven	End of loan	Summer		
	FW	(Belgium)	Hugo Cuypers	24	EU	(Belgium) Mechelen	Transfer	Summer	€1M	
	DF	(Greece)	José Holebas	37	EU		Released	Summer		
	GK	(Portugal)	José Sá	28	EU	(England) Wolves	Transfer	Summer	€8M	
	MF	(Mali)	Abdoulaye Keita	27	Non-EU		Released	Summer		
	DF	(Tunisia)	Yassine Meriah	28	Non-EU	(United Arab Emirates) Al Ain	Transfer	Summer	€1.5M	
	MF	(Portugal)	Tiago Silva	28	EU	(Portugal) Vitória Guimarães	Transfer	Summer	Free	
	MF	(Portugal)	Pêpê	24	EU	(Portugal) Famalicão	Loan	Summer	Free	
	FW	(Greece)	Fiorin Durmishaj	24	EU	(Greece) OFI	Transfer	Summer	Free	
	DF	(Guinea)	Fodé Camara	23	Non-EU	(Greece) Chania	Transfer	Summer	Free	
	DF	(Guinea)	Mamadou Kané	24	Non-EU	(Azerbaijan) Neftçi Baku	Loan	Summer	Free	
	MF	(Serbia)	Nikola Čumić	22	EU	(Switzerland) Luzern	Loan	Summer	Free	
	DF	(Tunisia)	Mohamed Dräger	25	EU	(England) Nottingham Forest	Transfer	Summer	Free	
	FW	(Argentina)	Franco Soldano	26	EU	(Spain) Fuenlabrada	Loan	Summer	Free	
	MF	(Serbia)	Lazar Ranđelović	24	EU	(Spain) Leganés	Loan	Summer	Free	
	DF	(Greece)	Giannis Masouras	25	EU	(Netherlands) Sparta Rotterdam	Loan	Summer	Free	
	FW	(Egypt)	Ahmed Hassan	28	EU	(Turkey) Konyaspor	Loan	Summer	€500k	
	MF	(Argentina)	Maximiliano Lovera	21	Non-EU	(Cyprus) Omonoia Nicosia	Loan	Winter	Free	
	DF	(Italy)	Adrian Galliani	20	EU	(Greece) Panionios	Loan	Winter	Free	
	DF	(Portugal)	Rúben Semedo	27	EU	(Portugal) Porto	Loan	Winter	€500k	
	FW	(Argentina)	Franco Soldano	27	EU	(Argentina) Gimnasia La Plata	Transfer	Winter	€300k	

▲ Total Income: €11.80M

Net Income: ▼€0.42M

== Friendlies ==
Win Draw Loss

26 June 2021	Olympiacos	1–0	Wolfsberger AC	Wörgl, Austria
18:00 EEST	Papastathopoulos (yellow card) 45'; Hassan 62'			Stadium: Sportzentrum Wörgl; Attendance: 0 (closed doors)

27 June 2021	Olympiacos	1–0	Krasnodar	Kufstein, Austria
19:00 EEST	Sourlis 81'		Spertsyan (yellow card) 82'	Attendance: 0 (closed doors)

29 June 2021	Olympiacos	0–3	Red Bull Salzburg	Kirchdorf, Austria
19:00 EEST			Junuzović 33'; Capaldo 35'; Adeyemi 67'	Attendance: 200

30 June 2021	Olympiacos	2–1	CSKA Sofia	Schwaz, Austria
19:30 EEST	Hassan 63'; Čumić 79'		Ahmedov 59'	Stadium: Silberstadt Arena; Attendance: 0 (closed doors)

2 July 2021	Olympiacos	1–1	Ufa	Jenbach, Austria
19:00 EEST	Masouras 38', (yellow card) 64'; Papastathopoulos (yellow card) 50'; Marković (yellow card) 79'; M. Camara (yellow card) 90'		Saplinov 21'	Attendance: 0 (closed doors)

3 July 2021	Olympiacos	2–0	Universitatea Craiova	Schwaz, Austria
17:00 EEST	Valbuena 9' (pen.); M'Vila 45'			Stadium: Silberstadt Arena; Attendance: 0 (closed doors)

14 July 2021	Olympiacos	3–0	Aris	Piraeus, Greece
21:00 EEST	M. Camara 37'; M'Vila 42'; Ranđelović 78'			Stadium: Karaiskakis Stadium; Attendance: 0 (closed doors)

3 September 2021	Aris	1–1	Olympiacos	Thessaloniki, Greece
20:00 EEST	García 38'		Papastathopoulos (yellow card) 68'; Papadopoulos 80'	Stadium: Kleanthis Vikelidis Stadium; Referee: Spyros Zampalas

9 April 2022 Global Tour for Peace	Olympiacos	1–0	Shakhtar Donetsk	Piraeus, Greece
20:00 EET	Tiquinho 22'			Stadium: Karaiskakis Stadium; Referee: Vasilis Fotias

== Competitions ==
=== Overview ===
Competition	Starting round	Final position	Record							
Competition	Starting round	Final position	Pld	W	D	L	GF	GA	GD	Win %
Super League Greece	Matchday 1	Winners	36	25	8	3	62	26	+36	69.44
Greek Football Cup	Round of 16	Semi-finals	6	2	2	2	9	7	+2	33.33
UEFA Champions League	Second qualifying round	Third qualifying round	4	2	2	0	5	3	+2	50.00
UEFA Europa League	Play-off round	Knockout round play-offs	10	4	1	5	14	14	+0	40.00
Total			56	33	13	10	90	50	+40	58.93

Last updated: 17 May 2022
Source: Competitions

=== Super League Greece ===
==== League table ====
Pos	Team	Pld	W	D	L	GF	GA	GD	Pts	Qualification
1	Olympiacos	26	20	5	1	47	14	+33	65	Qualification for the Play-off round
2	PAOK	26	16	5	5	50	24	+26	53	Qualification for the Play-off round
3	AEK Athens	26	14	4	8	42	28	+14	46	Qualification for the Play-off round
4	Aris	26	13	6	7	28	21	+7	45	Qualification for the Play-off round
5	Panathinaikos	26	13	3	10	41	21	+20	42	Qualification for the Play-off round

Source: Super League Greece
Rules for classification: 1) Points; 2) Head-to-head points; 3) Head-to-head goal difference; 4) Goal difference; 5) Goals scored; 6) Play-offs (neutral ground).
(Note: Criteria 6 is only used if needed to decide champion, teams for relegation or teams for UEFA competitions).

==== Results summary ====
Overall								Home						Away					
Pld	W	D	L	GF	GA	GD	Pts	W	D	L	GF	GA	GD	W	D	L	GF	GA	GD
36	25	8	3	62	26	+36	83	13	4	1	32	12	+20	12	4	2	30	14	+16

Last updated: 17 May 2022.
Source: Super League Greece

==== Results by matchday ====
Matchday	1	2	3	4	5	6	7	8	9	10	11	12	13	14	15	16	17	18	19	20	21	22	23	24	25	26
Ground	Η	Α	Η	Α	Η	Α	Η	Α	Η	Α	Η	Α	Η	Α	Η	Α	Η	Α	Η	Α	Η	Α	Η	Α	Η	Α
Result	D	W	W	W	D	W	W	W	W	W	W	W	W	W	W	D	D	W	D	W	W	W	W	W	W	L
Position	7	4	3	1	3	1	1	1	1	1	1	1	1	1	1	1	1	1	1	1	1	1	1	1	1	1

Updated to match(es) played on 6 March 2022. Source: Super League Greece
A = Away; H = Home; W = Win; D = Draw; L = Loss

Play-off round matchday	1	2	3	4	5	6	7	8	9	10
Ground	H	A	H	A	A	H	A	H	H	A
Result	W	D	D	L	W	W	W	L	D	W
Position	1	1	1	1	1	1	1	1	1	1

Updated to match(es) played on 17 May 2022. Source: Super League Greece
A = Away; H = Home; W = Win; D = Draw; L = Loss

==== Regular season matches ====
Win Draw Loss

12 September 2021 1	Olympiacos	0–0	Atromitos	Piraeus
20:30 EEST	Bah (yellow card) 90'	Report	Papadopoulos (yellow card) 31'; Salomon (yellow card) 33'; Castellano (yellow card) 84'; Kotsopoulos (yellow card) 88'; Pirić (yellow card) 89'	Stadium: Karaiskakis Stadium; Attendance: 11,958; Referee: Stathis Gortsilas

19 September 2021 2	Lamia	1–2	Olympiacos	Lamia
20:30 EEST	Romanić (yellow card) 41'; Mazoulouxis (yellow card) 70'; Karamanos 72'	Report	Cissé 12'; Bouchalakis 32'	Stadium: Athanasios Diakos Stadium; Attendance: 923; Referee: Aristotelis Diamantopoulos

22 September 2021 3	Olympiacos	4–1	Apollon Smyrnis	Piraeus
18:15 EEST	Masouras 8'; Tiquinho 47', 72'; Vrousai 87'	Report	Dauda 79'	Stadium: Karaiskakis Stadium; Attendance: 9,235; Referee: Menios Koutsiaftis

26 September 2021 4	Asteras Tripolis	0–2	Olympiacos	Tripoli
16:00 EEST	Álvarez (yellow card) 55'; Benito (yellow card) 62'	Report	Tiquinho 7'; A. Camara 23'; Cissé (yellow card) 45'	Stadium: Theodoros Kolokotronis Stadium; Attendance: 974; Referee: Konstantinos Tsetsilas

3 October 2021 5	Olympiacos	0–0	Panathinaikos	Piraeus
20:30 EEST	Tiquinho (yellow card) 89'; Cissé (yellow card) 90'	Report	Chatzigiovanis (yellow card) 45'; Brignoli (yellow card) 86'; Lundqvist (yellow card) 90'	Stadium: Karaiskakis Stadium; Attendance: 21,321; Referee: Slavko Vinčić (Slovenia)

17 October 2021 6	PAS Giannina	1–2	Olympiacos	Ioannina
20:30 EEST	Gardawski (yellow card) 20'; Erramuspe 61' (pen.); Schneider (yellow card) 68'; Perea (yellow card) 75'	Report	A. Camara 17', (yellow card) 59'; Papastathopoulos (yellow card) 43'; Reabciuk (yellow card) 71'; El-Arabi 84'; M. Camara (yellow card) 90'	Stadium: Zosimades Stadium; Attendance: 2,650; Referee: Angelos Evangelou

24 October 2021 7	Olympiacos	2–1	PAOK	Piraeus
20:30 EEST	A. Camara 21'; Masouras 32'; El-Arabi (yellow card) 52'; M. Camara (yellow card) 57'	Report	Sidcley (yellow card) 16'; Biseswar (yellow card) 44'; Murg 81'	Stadium: Karaiskakis Stadium; Attendance: 0 (closed doors); Referee: Deniz Aytekin (Germany)

30 October 2021 8	Panetolikos	1–2	Olympiacos	Agrinio
19:30 EEST	Vergos 19'; Flores (yellow card) 45'; Melissas (yellow card) 68'; Duarte (yellow card) 90'; Cornelius (yellow card) 90'	Report	Tiquinho 13'; El-Arabi 70' (pen.)	Stadium: Panetolikos Stadium; Attendance: 1,536; Referee: Vasilis Fotias

7 November 2021 9	Olympiacos	1–0	Ionikos	Piraeus
19:30 EET	Masouras 17'; A. Camara (yellow card) 64'	Report	Cabral (yellow card) 12'; Romao (yellow card) 63'; Aosman (yellow card) 90'	Stadium: Karaiskakis Stadium; Attendance: 10,835; Referee: Vangelis Manouchos

21 November 2021 10	AEK	2–3	Olympiacos	Athens
19:30 EET	Araujo 15', 79'; Amrabat (yellow card) 86'	Report	A. Camara 1'; El-Arabi 34', 70'; M'Vila (yellow card) 76'	Stadium: Olympic Stadium; Attendance: 28,883; Referee: Fábio Veríssimo (Portugal)

28 November 2021 11	Olympiacos	2–1	Volos	Piraeus
15:00 EET	El-Arabi 85' (pen.); Valbuena 90'	Report	Bartolo (yellow card) 11'; Klaiman (yellow card) 30'; Gülen (yellow card) 73'; Wojtkowski (yellow card) 81'; Regattin (yellow card) 84'; van Weert 88'	Stadium: Karaiskakis Stadium; Attendance: 14,001; Referee: Menios Koutsiaftis

4 December 2021 12	OFI	1–3	Olympiacos	Heraklion
19:30 EET	Diamantis 16'	Report	Cissé 24', 49'; Lopes 60'	Stadium: Theodoros Vardinogiannis Stadium; Attendance: 4,442; Referee: Aristotelis Diamantopoulos

12 December 2021 13	Olympiacos	1–0	Aris	Piraeus
19:30 EET	Cissé 54'; Lala (yellow card) 90'	Report	Šakić (yellow card) 40'; Manos (yellow card) 67'; Fabiano (yellow card) 72'; Matilla (yellow card) 90'	Stadium: Karaiskakis Stadium; Attendance: 15,045; Referee: Vangelis Manouchos

15 December 2021 14	Atromitos	0–3	Olympiacos	Peristeri
19:30 EET	Natsos (yellow card) 22'; Papadopoulos (yellow card) 34'	Report	El-Arabi 36' (pen.), 50', 62' (pen.); Androutsos (yellow card) 90'	Stadium: Peristeri Stadium; Referee: Dimitris Karantonis

19 December 2021 15	Olympiacos	1–0	Lamia	Piraeus
15:00 EET	El-Arabi 22'; Papastathopoulos (yellow card) 54'	Report	Provydakis (yellow card) 11'; Gentsoglou (yellow card) 51'	Stadium: Karaiskakis Stadium; Attendance: 8,728; Referee: Stathis Gortsilas

5 January 2022 16	Apollon Smyrnis	0–0	Olympiacos	Athens
19:30 EET	Kragiopoulos (yellow card) 29'; Vitlis (yellow card) 54'; Jakimovski (yellow card) 78'; Verhulst (yellow card) 84'; Ioannidis (yellow card) 87'	Report	M'Vila (yellow card) 44'	Stadium: Georgios Kamaras Stadium; Attendance: 389; Referee: Giorgos Tzovaras

2 March 2022 17	Olympiacos	5–1	Asteras Tripolis	Piraeus
19:00 EET	Papastathopoulos 52', (yellow card) 86'; Masouras 54', 57'; Bouchalakis 66'; El-Arabi (yellow card) 77'; Rodrigues 84'; Reabciuk (yellow card) 87'	Report	Carmona 75'	Stadium: Karaiskakis Stadium; Attendance: 7,514; Referee: Anastasios Papapetrou

16 January 2022 18	Panathinaikos	0–0	Olympiacos	Athens
19:30 EET	Villafáñez (yellow card) 42'	Report	Ba (yellow card) 17'; Masouras (yellow card) 39'; Manolas (yellow card) 62'; M. Camara (yellow card) 69'	Stadium: Leoforos Alexandras Stadium; Attendance: 1,000; Referee: Paweł Raczkowski (Poland)

23 January 2022 19	Olympiacos	2–0	PAS Giannina	Piraeus
19:30 EET	Masouras 4'; Tiquinho 88'	Report	Brener (yellow card) 36'; Karachalios (yellow card) 63'	Stadium: Karaiskakis Stadium; Attendance: 0 (closed doors); Referee: Konstantinos Perrakis

30 January 2022 20	PAOK	1–1	Olympiacos	Thessaloniki
19:30 EET	A. Živković (yellow card) 33'; Ba 42' (o.g.); Kurtić (yellow card) 45'; Crespo (yellow card) 90'	Report	M. Camara (yellow card) 30'; Papastathopoulos (yellow card) 35'; Tiquinho 43'; Ba (yellow card) 45'; Reabciuk (yellow card) 66'; A. Camara (yellow card) 84'	Stadium: Toumba Stadium; Referee: Luis Miguel Branco Godinho (Portugal)

2 February 2022 21	Olympiacos	3–1	Panetolikos	Piraeus
17:15 EET	Valbuena 1'; Rodrigues 4', 73'	Report	Morsay 28'; Pereyra (yellow card) 37'; Karelis (yellow card) 90'	Stadium: Karaiskakis Stadium; Attendance: 0 (closed doors); Referee: Andreas Gamaris

6 February 2022 22	Ionikos	0–3	Olympiacos	Nikaia
17:15 EET	Chyhrynskyi (yellow card) 36'; Tsirigotis (yellow card) 82'	Report	A. Camara 24'; Tiquinho (yellow card) 31', (goal) 56' (pen.); Masouras 58'	Stadium: Neapolis Public Stadium; Attendance: 319; Referee: Vangelis Manouchos

13 February 2022 23	Olympiacos	1–0	AEK	Piraeus
19:30 EET	Reabciuk (yellow card) 62'; M'Vila 84'; Lala (yellow card) 90'	Report	Rota (yellow card) 81'	Stadium: Karaiskakis Stadium; Attendance: 400; Referee: Orel Grinfeld (Israel)

20 February 2022 24	Volos	0–1	Olympiacos	Volos
17:15 EET	Alho (yellow card) 88'; van Weert (yellow card) 90'	Report	Valbuena 81'	Stadium: Panthessaliko Stadium; Attendance: 520; Referee: Vangelis Manouchos

27 February 2022 25	Olympiacos	2–0	OFI	Piraeus
19:30 EET	Rodrigues 19'; Durmishaj 89' (o.g.)	Report	Tsilianidis (yellow card) 45'; Giannoulis (red card) 70'; Pasalidis (yellow card) 84'	Stadium: Karaiskakis Stadium; Attendance: 9,835; Referee: Andreas Ekberg (Sweden)

6 March 2022 26	Aris	2–1	Olympiacos	Thessaloniki
19:00 EET	Kamara 52'; Gama 79'; Cuesta (yellow card) 90'	Report	El-Arabi 13'; Lala (yellow card) 24'; Carvalho (yellow card) 35'	Stadium: Kleanthis Vikelidis Stadium; Attendance: 6,614; Referee: Giorgos Tzovaras

==== Play-off round matches ====
13 March 2022 1	Olympiacos	2–1	Aris	Piraeus
19:00 EET	Manolas (yellow card) 33'; Bouchalakis (yellow card) 43'; Cissé 45'; El-Arabi 85' (pen.)	Report	Cuesta (yellow card) 39'; Kamara (yellow card) 51'; Ndiaye 61', (yellow card) 90'; Ganea (yellow card) 67'; Fabiano (yellow card) 83'; Matilla (yellow card) 84'; Sasha (yellow card) 86'	Stadium: Karaiskakis Stadium; Attendance: 10,834; Referee: Vangelis Manouchos

20 March 2022 2	PAS Giannina	1–1	Olympiacos	Ioannina
15:30 EET	Kargas (yellow card) 58'; Stanko (yellow card) 61'; Perea 70'	Report	El-Arabi 45'; Lala (yellow card) 56'	Stadium: Zosimades Stadium; Attendance: 1,859; Referee: Menios Koutsiaftis

3 April 2022 3	Olympiacos	1–1	AEK	Piraeus
20:00 EEST	A. Camara (yellow card) 19'; Carvalho 30'	Report	Szymański 43', (yellow card) 73'	Stadium: Karaiskakis Stadium; Attendance: 17,015; Referee: Aliyar Aghayev (Azerbaijan)

4 May 2022 4	PAOK	1–2	Olympiacos	Thessaloniki
19:00 EEST	Murg 10'; Sidcley (yellow card) 90'; Akpom (yellow card) 90'	Report	Masouras (yellow card) 37'; Lopes 51', (yellow card) 71'; Reabciuk 62'; Vaclík (yellow card) 79'; M. Camara (yellow card) 89'	Stadium: Toumba Stadium; Attendance: 7,369; Referee: Luís Godinho (Portugal)

17 April 2022 5	Panathinaikos	1–0	Olympiacos	Athens
21:30 EEST	Aitor 42'; Pérez (yellow card) 90'	Report	Lala (yellow card) 51'; A. Camara (yellow card) 82'	Stadium: Leoforos Alexandras Stadium; Attendance: 9,416; Referee: Nikola Dabanović (Montenegro)

1 May 2022 6	Olympiacos	3–2	PAS Giannina	Piraeus
17:00 EEST	El-Arabi 6'; Rodrigues 43'; Bouchalakis (yellow card) 45'; Papastathopoulos (yellow card) 90'; Lopes 90', (yellow card) 90'	Report	Saliakas (yellow card) 41'; Peersman (yellow card) 44'; Stanko (yellow card) 45'; Perea 45'; Schneider 80'; Ikonomopoulos (yellow card) 86'	Stadium: Karaiskakis Stadium; Attendance: 13,532; Referee: Dimitris Karantonis

8 May 2022 7	Aris	0–1	Olympiacos	Thessaloniki
21:00 EEST	M'Bakata (yellow card) 33'	Report	Tiquinho 55'; Kané (yellow card) 60'	Stadium: Kleanthis Vikelidis Stadium; Attendance: 6,208; Referee: Vasilis Fotias

11 May 2022 8	Olympiacos	1–2	Panathinaikos	Piraeus
21:00 EEST	Papadopoulos (yellow card) 26'; Papastathopoulos (yellow card) 30'; Tiquinho 70'; El-Arabi (yellow card) 75'	Report	Palacios 10'; Ioannidis (yellow card) 22'; Alexandropoulos (yellow card) 28'; Schenkeveld 54'; Pérez (yellow card) 75'; Šarlija (yellow card) 89'; Brignoli (yellow card) 90'	Stadium: Karaiskakis Stadium; Attendance: 16,085; Referee: Roi Reinshreiber (Israel)

14 May 2022 9	Olympiacos	1–1	PAOK	Piraeus
20:00 EEST	Papastathopoulos (yellow card) 14'; Fadiga (yellow card) 31'; Carvalho 41'	Report	Soares 2'; Kurtić (yellow card) 50'	Stadium: Karaiskakis Stadium; Attendance: 28.765; Referee: Angelos Evangelou

17 May 2022 10	AEK	2–3	Olympiacos	Athens
20:00 EEST	Zuber 14'; Mohammadi (yellow card) 31'; García 48'; Michelin (yellow card) 82'	Report	El-Arabi 20', 69', 87'; Masouras (yellow card) 58'	Stadium: Olympic Stadium; Attendance: 2.717; Referee: Danny Makkelie

=== Greek Football Cup ===
Win Draw Loss

==== Round of 16 ====
1 December 2021 First leg	Levadiakos	3–2	Olympiacos	Livadeia
17:00 EET	Poletto 3'; Panagiotou 6'; Liagas (yellow card) 53'; Doumtsios 61'; Albanis (yellow card) 79'		Semedo 26'; Lopes 63'	Stadium: Levadia Municipal Stadium; Referee: Alexandros Tsakalidis

22 December 2021 Second leg	Olympiacos	2–0 (4–3 agg.)	Levadiakos	Piraeus
19:00 EET	Tiquinho 25', 43'		Nili (yellow card) 40'; Hammond (yellow card) 49'	Stadium: Karaiskakis Stadium; Referee: Menios Koutsiaftis

==== Quarter-finals ====
19 January 2022 First leg	Panetolikos	2–1	Olympiacos	Agrinio
15:00 EET	Mendoza 23', (yellow card) 30'; Karelis 60'; Vergos (yellow card) 78'; Morsay (yellow card) 90'		El-Arabi 13'; Papadopoulos (yellow card) 28'	Stadium: Panetolikos Stadium; Referee: Menios Koutsiaftis

9 February 2022 Second leg	Olympiacos	3–1 (a.e.t.) (4–3 agg.)	Panetolikos	Piraeus
18:00 EET	Fadiga 6'; Papadopoulos (yellow card) 35'; M. Camara (yellow card) 75'; Ba (yellow card) 87'; Masouras 90', 115'		Vrgoč (yellow card) 43'; Larsson (yellow card) 77'; Duarte (yellow card) 79' (yellow-red card) 89'; Mendoza (yellow card) 80'; Karelis 85'; Anestis (yellow card) 111'	Stadium: Karaiskakis Stadium; Attendance: 0 (closed doors); Referee: Stathis Gortsilas

==== Semi-finals ====
21 April 2022 First leg	PAOK	0–0	Olympiacos	Thessaloniki
19:30 EET	Akpom (yellow card) 27'; Crespo (yellow card) 68'; Douglas Augusto (yellow card) 70'		Manolas (yellow card) 16'; Lala (yellow card) 58'; Papastathopoulos (yellow card) 89'	Stadium: Toumba Stadium; Referee: Daniele Chiffi (Italy)

27 April 2022 Second leg	Olympiacos	1–1 (a.e.t.) (1–1 (a) agg.)	PAOK	Piraeus
20:00 EET	Cissé (yellow card) 43'; Papastathopoulos (yellow card) 77'; Valbuena (yellow card) 102'; El-Arabi 105' (pen.)		A. Živković (yellow card) 45'; Ingason (yellow card) 105'; Čolak 109'	Stadium: Karaiskakis Stadium; Referee: Valentín Pizarro Gómez (Spain)

=== UEFA Champions League ===
Win Draw Loss

==== Second qualifying round ====
21 July 2021 First leg	Olympiacos (Greece)	1–0	(Azerbaijan) Neftçi Baku	Piraeus, Greece
22:00 EEST	Bouchalakis (yellow card) 8'; M. Camara 29', (red card) 43'; Marković (yellow card) 72'; Sourlis (yellow card) 90'	Report	Alaskarov (yellow card) 22'; Mahmudov (yellow card) 53'; Çelik (red card) 63'	Stadium: Karaiskakis Stadium; Attendance: 7,305; Referee: João Pinheiro (Portugal)

28 July 2021 Second leg	Neftçi Baku (Azerbaijan)	0–1 (0–2 agg.)	(Greece) Olympiacos	Baku, Azerbaijan
20:00 EEST		Report	Masouras 15'	Stadium: Bakcell Arena; Attendance: 5,500; Referee: Ricardo de Burgos (Spain)

==== Third qualifying round ====
3 August 2021 First leg	Olympiacos (Greece)	1–1	(Bulgaria) Ludogorets Razgrad	Piraeus, Greece
22:00 EEST	Semedo (yellow card) 43'; Cissé (yellow card) 49'; A. Camara 87'	Report	Despodov 50'; Tekpetey (yellow card) 57'; Nedyalkov (yellow card) 90'	Stadium: Karaiskakis Stadium; Attendance: 9,212; Referee: Bobby Madden (Scotland)

10 August 2021 Second leg	Ludogorets Razgrad (Bulgaria)	2–2 (a.e.t.) (3–3 agg.) (4–1 p)	(Greece) Olympiacos	Razgrad, Bulgaria
21:00 EEST	Badji (yellow card) 27'; Semedo 49' (o.g.); Sotiriou 57' (pen.); Verdon (yellow card) 66'; Gonçalves (yellow card) 111'	Report	M'Vila 31'; Ba (yellow card) 33' (yellow-red card) 86'; El-Arabi 68' (pen.); Reabciuk (yellow card) 82'	Stadium: Huvepharma Arena; Referee: Orel Grinfeld (Israel)
	Penalties
	Sotiriou (penalty scored); Santana (penalty scored); Verdon (penalty scored); Cicinho (penalty scored)		(penalty missed) Valbuena; (penalty missed) Hassan; (penalty scored) Lala

=== UEFA Europa League ===
Win Draw Loss

==== Play-off round ====
19 August 2021 First leg	Olympiacos (Greece)	3–0	(Slovakia) Slovan Bratislava	Piraeus, Greece
22:00 EEST	M. Camara 37'; Cissé 52'; Valbuena (yellow card) 62'; Bozhikov 68' (o.g.)	Report	Bozhikov (yellow card) 7'; Kashia (yellow card) 90'	Stadium: Karaiskakis Stadium; Attendance: 9,823; Referee: Marco Guida (Italy)

26 August 2021 Second leg	Slovan Bratislava (Slovakia)	2–2 (2–5 agg.)	(Greece) Olympiacos	Bratislava, Slovakia
21:45 EEST	De Marco (red card) 26'; Weiss (yellow card) 37'; Henty 42'; Green 62'	Report	M. Camara (yellow card) 11'; El-Arabi 33'; Onyekuru 54'; Vrousai (yellow card) 78'; Bouchalakis (yellow card) 88'	Stadium: Tehelné pole Attendance: 7,201; Referee: Deniz Aytekin (Germany)

==== Group stage ====
The group stage draw was held on 27 August 2021.

Pos	Team	Pld	W	D	L	GF	GA	GD	Pts	Qualification	FRA	OLY	FEN	ANT
1	(Germany) Eintracht Frankfurt	6	3	3	0	10	6	+4	12	Advance to round of 16	—	3–1	1–1	2–2
2	(Greece) Olympiacos	6	3	0	3	8	7	+1	9	Advance to knockout round play-offs	1–2	—	1–0	2–1
3	(Turkey) Fenerbahçe	6	1	3	2	7	8	−1	6	Transfer to Europa Conference League	1–1	0–3	—	2–2
4	(Belgium) Antwerp	6	1	2	3	6	10	−4	5		0–1	1–0	0–3	—

Source: UEFA
Rules for classification: Group stage tiebreakers

16 September 2021 1	Olympiacos (Greece)	2–1	(Belgium) Antwerp	Piraeus, Greece
22:00 EEST	Cissé (yellow card) 49'; El-Arabi 52'; A. Camara (yellow card) 67'; Reabciuk 87'	Report	Verstraete (yellow card) 4'; Jelle Bataille (yellow card) 53' (yellow-red card) 90'; Samatta 75'; Gerkens (yellow card) 90'	Stadium: Karaiskakis Stadium; Attendance: 15,615; Referee: Tamás Bognár (Hungary)

30 September 2021 2	Fenerbahçe (Turkey)	0–3	(Greece) Olympiacos	Istanbul, Turkey
19:45 EEST	Valencia (yellow card) 42'; Zajc (yellow card) 72'	Report	Tiquinho 6'; Reabciuk (yellow card) 38'; Cissé (yellow card) 42'; Ba (yellow card) 45'; Masouras 63', 68'	Stadium: Şükrü Saracoğlu Stadium; Attendance: 22,160; Referee: Alejandro Hernández (Spain)

21 October 2021 3	Eintracht Frankfurt (Germany)	3–1	(Greece) Olympiacos	Frankfurt, Germany
22:00 EEST	Borré 26' (pen.); Paciência (yellow card) 35'; Touré 45'; Tuta (yellow card) 50'; Kamada 59'	Report	Cissé (yellow card) 25'; El-Arabi 30' (pen.); Papastathopoulos (yellow card) 39'; M. Camara (yellow card) 48'; Kunde (yellow card) 84'	Stadium: Deutsche Bank Park; Attendance: 35,000; Referee: Tiago Martins (Portugal)

4 November 2021 4	Olympiacos (Greece)	1–2	(Germany) Eintracht Frankfurt	Piraeus, Greece
19:45 EET	El-Arabi 12'	Report	Kamada 17'; Barkok (yellow card) 32'; Hauge 90'; Trapp (yellow card) 90'	Stadium: Karaiskakis Stadium; Attendance: 25,000; Referee: Aleksei Kulbakov (Belarus)

25 November 2021 5	Olympiacos (Greece)	1–0	(Turkey) Fenerbahçe	Piraeus, Greece
22:00 EET	Ba (yellow card) 39'; Tiquinho 90', (yellow card) 90'	Report		Stadium: Karaiskakis Stadium; Referee: Antonio Mateu Lahoz (Spain)

9 December 2021 6	Antwerp (Belgium)	1–0	(Greece) Olympiacos	Antwerp, Belgium
19:45 EET	Balikwisha 7'	Report	Tiquinho (yellow card) 38'; Cissé (yellow card) 90'	Stadium: Bosuilstadion; Referee: Marco Di Bello (Italy)

==== Knockout phase ====
===== Knockout round play-offs =====
The knockout round play-offs draw was held on 13 December 2021.

17 February 2022 First leg	Atalanta (Italy)	2–1	(Greece) Olympiacos	Bergamo, Italy
22:00 EET	Pašalić (yellow card) 33'; Djimsiti 61', 63'; Demiral (yellow card) 78'; Pezzella (yellow card) 90'	Report	Tiquinho 16'; Papastathopoulos (yellow card) 53'	Stadium: Stadio di Bergamo; Attendance: 9,448; Referee: Sandro Schärer (Switzerland)

24 February 2022 Second leg	Olympiacos (Greece)	0–3 (1–5 agg.)	(Italy) Atalanta	Piraeus, Greece
19:45 EET	Cissé (yellow card) 4'; M'Vila (yellow card) 56'; M. Camara (yellow card) 85'	Report	Mæhle 40'; Tolói (yellow card) 54'; Malinovskyi 67', 69'	Stadium: Karaiskakis Stadium; Attendance: 15,835; Referee: Carlos del Cerro Grande (Spain)

== Squad statistics ==
=== Appearances ===
As of match played 17 May 2022

No.	Pos.	Nat.	Name	Greek Super League	Greek Cup	UEFA Champions League	UEFA Europa League	Total
No.	Pos.	Nat.	Name	Apps	Apps	Apps	Apps	Apps
11	FW	(Morocco)	Youssef El-Arabi	21(13)	2(2)	1(2)	6(4)	30(21)
45	DF	(Moldova)	Oleg Reabciuk	32	3	3	10	48
29	FW	(Brazil)	Tiquinho	18(16)	3(2)	0	4(4)	25(22)
19	MF	(Greece)	Georgios Masouras	26(5)	2(1)	4	6(2)	38(8)
6	MF	(France)	Yann M'Vila	27(4)	2(1)	1(1)	9	39(6)
4	MF	(Guinea)	Mady Camara	19(9)	3(1)	3	9(1)	34(11)
1	GK	(Czech Republic)	Tomáš Vaclík	32	2	0	10	44
5	MF	(Greece)	Andreas Bouchalakis	21(7)	3(1)	2	4(4)	30(12)
28	MF	(France)	Mathieu Valbuena	6(22)	2(1)	2(2)	2(5)	12(30)
27	DF	(France)	Kenny Lala	24(2)	2	2(1)	8(1)	36(4)
66	DF	(Senegal)	Pape Abou Cissé	22(3)	2	2(2)	9	35(5)
22	MF	(Guinea)	Aguibou Camara	24(2)	0(2)	0(2)	9(1)	33(7)
15	DF	(Greece)	Sokratis Papastathopoulos	25	2(1)	0(1)	10	37(2)
17	MF	(Greece)	Marios Vrousai	5(13)	4(2)	1(2)	0(6)	10(23)
24	DF	(Senegal)	Ousseynou Ba	14(3)	2(1)	3	2(2)	21(6)
7	MF	(Nigeria)	Henry Onyekuru	5(9)	3	0	8(2)	16(11)
10	MF	(Portugal)	Rony Lopes	10(8)	0(3)	0	1(5)	11(16)
8	MF	(Cameroon)	Pierre Kunde	5(7)	1(3)	3(1)	0(6)	9(17)
14	MF	(Greece)	Thanasis Androutsos	6(9)	3(1)	2(1)	0(2)	11(13)
77	MF	(Cape Verde)	Garry Rodrigues	13(6)	2(1)	0	0	15(7)
20	MF	(Portugal)	João Carvalho	10(3)	1(2)	0	0	11(5)
40	DF	(Greece)	Kostas Manolas	8(3)	1	0	2	11(3)
34	DF	(Greece)	Avraam Papadopoulos	4(4)	2(1)	0	0	6(5)
90	MF	(Greece)	Vasilis Sourlis	0(4)	3(1)	1(1)	0	4(6)
33	DF	(Poland)	Michał Karbownik	4(3)	1	0	1	6(3)
88	GK	(Greece)	Konstantinos Tzolakis	3	1	4	0	8
75	MF	(Greece)	Fotis Kitsos	4(1)	1(2)	0	0	5(3)
21	MF	(France)	Bandiougou Fadiga	2(3)	1	0	0(1)	3(4)
36	MF	(Guinea)	Mamadou Kané	3(2)	1	0	0	4(2)
3	DF	(Portugal)	Rúben Semedo	0	1	4	0	5
9	FW	(Egypt)	Ahmed Hassan	0	0	3(1)	0(1)	3(2)
31	GK	(Iceland)	Ögmundur Kristinsson	1	3	0	0	4
25	DF	(Serbia)	Svetozar Marković	0	1	2	0(1)	3(1)
41	DF	(Greece)	Petros Bagalianis	2	1	0	0	3
53	MF	(Greece)	Kostas Fortounis	1(2)	0	0	0	1(2)
12	FW	(Guinea)	Algassime Bah	0(1)	1	0	0	1(1)
97	MF	(Serbia)	Lazar Ranđelović	0	0	1(1)	0	1(1)
9	MF	(Argentina)	Maximiliano Lovera	0(1)	0(1)	0	0	0(2)
30	DF	(Greece)	Apostolos Apostolopoulos	0	1	0	0	1
26	MF	(Greece)	Giorgos Xenitidis	0	1	0	0	1
44	GK	(Greece)	Ilias Karargyris	0(1)	0	0	0	0(1)
72	MF	(Greece)	Giorgos Marinos	0	0(1)	0	0	0(1)

=== Goalscorers ===
As of match played 17 May 2022

No.	Pos.	Nat.	Name	Greek Super League	Greek Cup	UEFA Champions League	UEFA Europa League	Total
No.	Pos.	Nat.	Name	Goals	Goals	Goals	Goals	Goals
11	FW	(Morocco)	Youssef El-Arabi	16	2	1	4	23
29	FW	(Brazil)	Tiquinho	9	2	0	3	14
19	MF	(Greece)	Georgios Masouras	7	2	1	2	12
22	MF	(Guinea)	Aguibou Camara	5	0	1	0	6
66	DF	(Senegal)	Pape Abou Cissé	5	0	0	1	6
77	MF	(Cape Verde)	Garry Rodrigues	5	0	0	0	5
10	MF	(Portugal)	Rony Lopes	3	1	0	0	4
28	MF	(France)	Mathieu Valbuena	3	0	0	0	3
5	MF	(Greece)	Andreas Bouchalakis	2	0	0	0	2
20	MF	(Portugal)	João Carvalho	2	0	0	0	2
6	MF	(France)	Yann M'Vila	1	0	1	0	2
45	DF	(Moldova)	Oleg Reabciuk	1	0	0	1	2
4	MF	(Guinea)	Mady Camara	0	0	1	1	2
15	DF	(Greece)	Sokratis Papastathopoulos	1	0	0	0	1
17	MF	(Greece)	Marios Vrousai	1	0	0	0	1
7	MF	(Nigeria)	Henry Onyekuru	0	0	0	1	1
21	MF	(France)	Bandiougou Fadiga	0	1	0	0	1
3	DF	(Portugal)	Rúben Semedo	0	1	0	0	1

Own Goals: 2

== Individual Awards ==
Name	Pos.	Award
(Greece) Georgios Masouras	Winger	Super League Greece Greek Footballer of the Season; Super League Greece Team of the Season
(France) Yann M'Vila	Defensive Midfielder	Super League Greece Team of the Season
(Senegal) Pape Cissé	Centre Back	Super League Greece Team of the Season; Super League Greece Player of the Month December 2021
(Czech Republic) Tomáš Vaclík	Goalkeeper	Super League Greece Player of the Month January 2022
(Morocco) Youssef El-Arabi	Forward	Olympiacos Player of the Season; Super League Greece Player of the Month November 2021, May 2022
