= List of Greek football transfers winter 2021–22 =

This is a list of Greek football transfers winter 2021–22. Only clubs in 2021–22 Super League Greece are included.

== Super League 1 ==
=== AEK Athens ===
In:

No.	Pos.	Nation	Player
—	MF	SWE	Alexander Fransson (from (Sweden) Norrköping)
—	MF	POL	Grzegorz Krychowiak (loan from (Russia) Krasnodar)

Out:

No.	Pos.	Nation	Player
—	DF	UKR	Oleh Danchenko (on loan to (Ukraine) Zorya Luhansk)
—	DF	ARG	Emanuel Insúa (to (Argentina) Vélez Sarsfield)

=== Apollon Smyrnis ===
In:

No.	Pos.	Nation	Player
19	MF	GHA	Raman Chibsah (from (Germany) VfL Bochum)

Out:

No.	Pos.	Nation	Player
—	MF	ROU	Florentin Matei (to (Romania) UTA Arad)

=== Aris ===
In:

No.	Pos.	Nation	Player
—	DF	COD	Salem M'Bakata (Free Agent)
—	MF	FRA	Cheick Doukouré (from (Spain) Leganés)
—	FW	HON	Luis Palma (from (Honduras) Vida)
—	FW	GRE	Konstantinos Chatzipirpiridis (loan return from Olympiacos Volos)

Out:

No.	Pos.	Nation	Player
—	MF	AUS	James Jeggo (to (Belgium) Eupen)
—	MF	MKD	Ali Adem (on loan to Veria)
—	FW	GRE	Konstantinos Chatzipirpiridis (to Iraklis)

=== Asteras Tripolis ===
In:

No.	Pos.	Nation	Player

Out:

No.	Pos.	Nation	Player
-	FW	NGR	Sudais Ali Baba (on loan to Xanthi)

=== Atromitos ===
In:

No.	Pos.	Nation	Player
17	MF	SWE	August Erlingmark (from (Sweden) IFK Göteborg)
95	MF	ROU	Dorin Rotariu (on loan from (Bulgaria) Ludogorets Razgrad)
70	FW	ROU	Denis Alibec (loan from (Turkey) Kayserispor)

Out:

No.	Pos.	Nation	Player
—	DF	BRA	Lucas Galvão (to Austria Wien)

=== Ionikos ===
In:

No.	Pos.	Nation	Player
—	GK	SLO	Nejc Vidmar (on loan from (Slovenia) Olimpija Ljubljana)
—	MF	GRE	Vangelis Platellas (from Xanthi)
—	MF	GRE	Vasilios Mantzis (from Olympiakos Nicosia)
—	FW	POR	Ricardo Valente (from (Turkey) Tuzlaspor)

Out:

No.	Pos.	Nation	Player

=== Lamia ===
In:

No.	Pos.	Nation	Player
—	MF	GUI	Lass Bangoura (on loan from (Spain) Rayo Vallecano)
—	FW	GEO	Nika Ninua (on loan from (Greece) PAOK)
—	FW	GRE	Apostolos Vellios (from (Romania) Academica Clinceni)

Out:

No.	Pos.	Nation	Player
—	MF	SRB	Nenad Gavrić (to (Italy) Crotone)

=== OFI ===
In:

No.	Pos.	Nation	Player
-	MF	GRE	Giannis Bouzoukis (from Panathinaikos)
—	FW	BRA	Luiz Phellype (on loan from (Portugal) Sporting CP)

Out:

No.	Pos.	Nation	Player
—	MF	GRE	Alexandros Gargalatzidis (on loan to Olympiacos Volos)
—	FW	GRE	Frixos Grivas (on loan to Kalamata)

=== Olympiacos ===
In:

No.	Pos.	Nation	Player
—	DF	GRE	Kostas Manolas (from (Italy) Napoli)
—	DF	MNE	Almir Klica (from (Luxembourg) Jeunesse Esch)
—	MF	ARG	Maximiliano Lovera (loan return from (Argentina) Racing Club)
—	MF	FRA	Bandiougou Fadiga (from (France) Paris Saint-Germain)
—	MF	GUI	Mamadou Kané (loan return from (Azerbaijan) Neftçi Baku)
—	MF	POR	João Carvalho (from (England) Nottingham Forest)
—	MF	FRA	Abdoulaye Dabo (from (France) Nantes)
—	MF	ESP	Diby Keita (from (Spain) Real Madrid U19)
—	MF	KSA	Messari Al-Mashhari (from (Saudi Arabia) Al Nassr)
—	MF	KSA	Mohammed Al-Qahtani (from (Saudi Arabia) Abha Club)

Out:

No.	Pos.	Nation	Player
—	MF	ARG	Maximiliano Lovera (loan to (Cyprus) Omonoia Nicosia)
—	MF	ITA	Adrian Galliani (loan to (Greece) Panionios)
—	MF	POR	Rúben Semedo (loan to (Portugal) Porto)

=== Panathinaikos ===
In:

No.	Pos.	Nation	Player
50	MF	SRB	Mijat Gaćinović (on loan from (Germany) 1899 Hoffenheim)

Out:

No.	Pos.	Nation	Player
-	MF	COD	Yeni Ngbakoto (to (France) Nancy)
-	MF	GRE	Giannis Bouzoukis (to OFI Crete)
-	FW	GRE	Kristo Shehu (to Egaleo)

=== Panetolikos ===
In:

No.	Pos.	Nation	Player
—	GK	GRE	Giannis Anestis (from (Sweden) IFK Göteborg)

Out:

No.	Pos.	Nation	Player
—	DF	GRE	Stathis Belevonis (on loan to Kavala)
—	MF	BIH	Edin Cocalic (to (Bosnia and Herzegovina) Željezničar)
—	MF	GRE	Giorgos Manthatis (to Kallithea)
—	MF	GRE	Dimitris Fytopoulos

=== PAOK ===
In:

No.	Pos.	Nation	Player
—	DF	ESP	Joan Sastre (loan return from (Spain) Mallorca)
—	MF	POR	Filipe Soares (from (Portugal) Moreirense)
—	MF	GEO	Nika Ninua (loan return from (Cyprus) Anorthosis)
—	FW	BRA	Léo Jabá (loan return from (Brazil) Vasco da Gama)
—	FW	CRO	Antonio Čolak (loan return from (Sweden) Malmö FF)

Out:

No.	Pos.	Nation	Player
—	DF	BRA	Rodrigo Soares (on loan from (Brazil) Juventude)
—	MF	JPN	Shinji Kagawa (to (Belgium) Sint-Truiden)
—	MF	GRE	Giannis Konstantelias (on loan to (Belgium) KAS Eupen)
—	MF	NGR	Anderson Esiti (to (Hungary) Ferencváros)
—	FW	POL	Karol Świderski (to (United States) Charlotte])
—	FW	GEO	Nika Ninua (on loan to (Greece) Lamia)

=== PAS Giannina ===
In:

No.	Pos.	Nation	Player
—	DF	USA	Caleb Stanko (on loan to (United States) FC Cincinnati)
—	DF	GER	Louis Poznański (from (Germany) Werder Bremen II)

Out:

No.	Pos.	Nation	Player
—	MF	UKR	Vladyslav Naumets (to (Ukraine) Mynai)
—	FW	MDA	Nicolae Milinceanu (to (Cyprus) AEL Limassol)

=== Volos ===
In:

No.	Pos.	Nation	Player
16	DF	CYP	Christos Shelis (from (Bulgaria) Levski Sofia)
3	DF	FIN	Nikolai Alho (from (Hungary) MTK Budapest)
11	MF	ARG	Jorge Correa (from (Azerbaijan) Neftçi)

Out:

No.	Pos.	Nation	Player
11	MF	POL	Kamil Wojtkowski (from (Cyprus) Ethnikos Achna)
2	DF	POL	Jakub Kuzdra
