= Bandiougou Fadiga =

French footballer (born 2001)

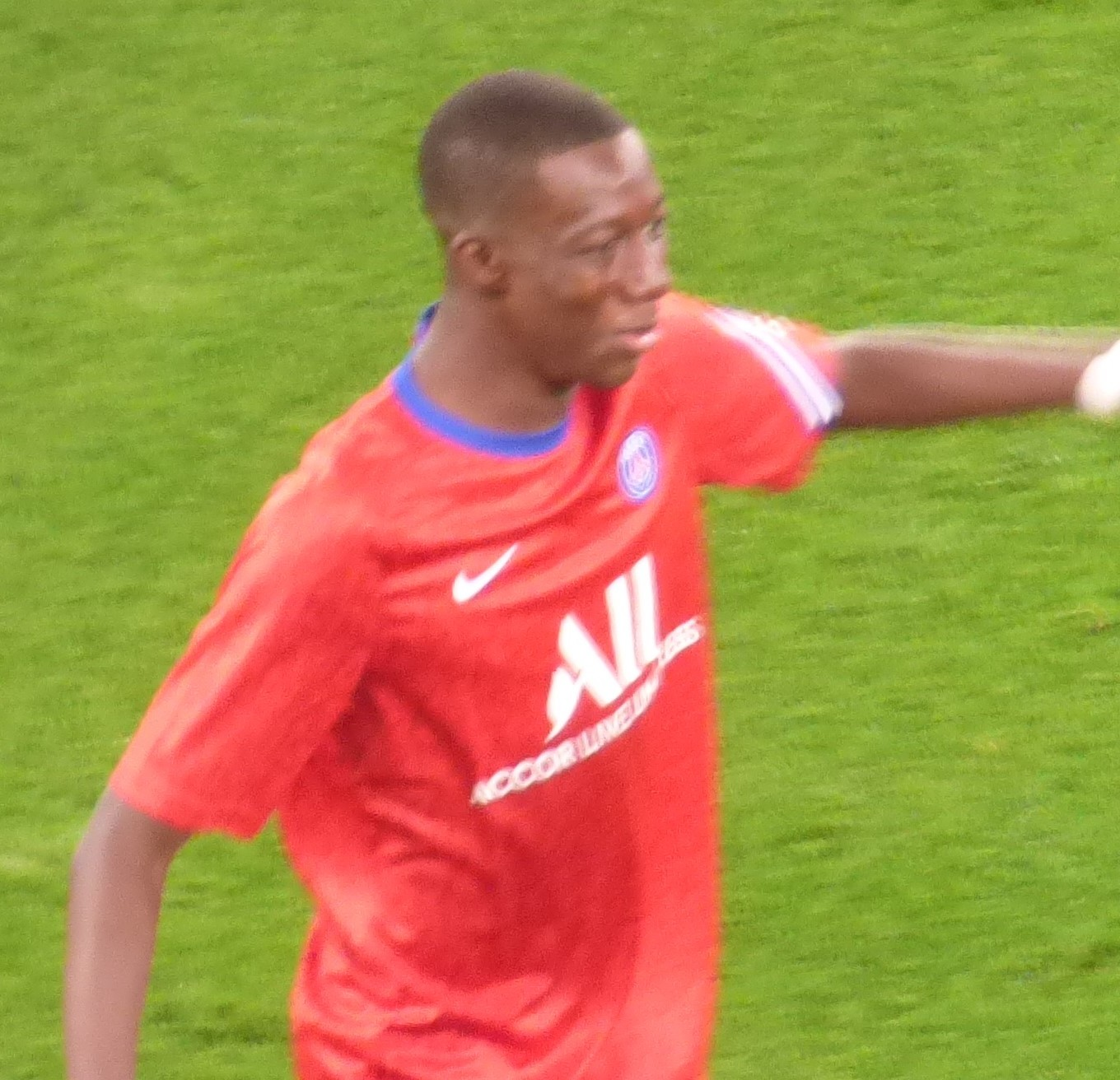
- Fadiga with Paris Saint-Germain in 2020

Personal information
- Full name: Bandiougou Fadiga
- Date of birth: 15 January 2001 (age 25)
- Place of birth: Paris, France
- Height: 1.78 m (5 ft 10 in)
- Position: Midfielder

Team information
- Current team: Lorient
- Number: 7

Youth career
- 2010–2013: Issy-les-Moulineaux
- 2013–2020: Paris Saint-Germain

Senior career*
Years	Team	Apps	(Gls)
2018	Paris Saint-Germain B	1	(0)
2020–2022	Paris Saint-Germain	6	(0)
2021	→ Brest (loan)	4	(0)
2022–2024	Olympiacos	5	(0)
2022–2024	Olympiacos B	8	(0)
2022–2023	→ Ionikos (loan)	28	(1)
2024–	Lorient	6	(0)
2024–	Lorient B	5	(0)
- * Club domestic league appearances and goals as of 28 February 2026

Bandiougou Fadiga (born 15 January 2001) is a French professional footballer who plays as a midfielder for Ligue 1 club Lorient.

== Career ==
=== Paris Saint-Germain ===
An academy graduate of Paris Saint-Germain (PSG), Fadiga signed his first professional contract on 29 January 2019. He made his professional debut on 16 September 2020 in a 1–0 Ligue 1 win against Metz. "I feel a lot of pride, it was difficult to come on in such a match. I cannot ask for more than a win at the Parc for my first game," he said to PSG TV after the match. Fadiga would go on to make five more appearances in the first half of the 2020–21 season for PSG.

==== Loan to Brest ====
On 1 February 2021, Fadiga joined Ligue 1 side Brest on loan until the end of the season, with the deal containing a purchase option. He made his debut for the club in a 2–1 Coupe de France win over Rodez on 10 February. On 6 March, Fadiga started in a 3–0 home Coupe de France defeat to his parent club PSG. At the 9th minute of the match, he was punished by Marco Verratti, who stole the ball from him and provided the assist for Kylian Mbappé's opening goal. In the second half of the match, Fadiga tested PSG goalkeeper Sergio Rico with several attempts, but did not manage to score. At the end of the season, Fadiga returned to the capital from his loan in Brittany, having made a total of six appearances.

=== Olympiacos ===
On 14 January 2022, Fadiga signed for Super League Greece side Olympiacos on a contract until 2026. He made his debut as a substitute in a 3–1 league win over Panetolikos on 2 February. One week later, he made his first start for Olympiacos in a 3–1 Greek Cup quarter-final win over the same opponents. At the third minute of the match, Fadiga fired a ball onto the crossbar; he scored three minutes later after stealing the ball from opponent Johan Mårtensson and receiving an assist from João Carvalho. In his first season with Olympiacos, Fadiga won the league title.

In the 2022–23 season, Fadiga joined fellow Super League Greece club Ionikos on loan. He became an integral member of the squad, playing twenty-eight league matches and scoring one goal. In May 2023, it was revealed that he had been voted Ionikos's Player of the Season. However, the club was relegated at the end of the season.

=== Lorient ===
On 14 August 2024, Fadiga joined Lorient on a four-year contract.

== Personal life ==
Born in France, Fadiga holds French and Malian nationalities.

== Career statistics ==
As of 1 July 2026

Appearances and goals by club, season and competition
Club	Season	League			Cup		Continental		Other		Total	
Club	Season	Division	Apps	Goals	Apps	Goals	Apps	Goals	Apps	Goals	Apps	Goals
Paris Saint-Germain B	2018–19	Championnat National 2	1	0	—		—		—		1	0
Paris Saint-Germain	2020–21	Ligue 1	6	0	0	0	0	0	0	0	6	0
Brest (loan)	2020–21	Ligue 1	4	0	2	0	—		—		6	0
Olympiacos	2021–22	Super League Greece	5	0	1	1	1 (Note: Appearance(s) in the UEFA Europa League.)	0	—		7	1
Olympiacos B	2021–22	Super League Greece 2	2	0	—		—		—		2	0
Olympiacos B	2023–24	Super League Greece 2	6	0	—		—		—		6	0
Olympiacos B	Total		8	0	—		—		—		8	0
Ionikos (loan)	2022–23	Super League Greece	28	1	1	0	—		—		29	1
Lorient B	2024–25	Championnat National 3	2	0	—		—		—		2	0
Lorient	2024–25	Ligue 2	6	0	1	0	—		—		7	0
Lorient	2025–26	Ligue 1	0	0	2	0	—		—		2	0
Lorient	Total		6	0	3	0	—		—		9	0
Career total			60	1	7	1	1	0	0	0	68	2

== Honours ==
Olympiacos

- Super League Greece: 2021–22

Lorient

- Ligue 2: 2024–25

Individual

- Ionikos Player of the Season: 2022–23
