= Vasilios Sourlis =

Greek footballer (born 2002)

Personal information
- Date of birth: 16 November 2002 (age 23)
- Place of birth: Athens, Greece
- Height: 1.83 m (6 ft 0 in)
- Position: Midfielder

Team information
- Current team: Iraklis
- Number: 90

Youth career
- Olympiacos

Senior career*
Years	Team	Apps	(Gls)
2019–2023	Olympiacos	8	(0)
2021–2022	Olympiacos B	32	(5)
2022–2023	→ Fortuna Sittard (loan)	2	(0)
2023–2024	Asteras Tripolis	16	(0)
2024	Raków Częstochowa	0	(0)
2024–2025	Lamia	17	(0)
2025–2026	AEL	23	(0)
2026–	Iraklis	5	(0)

International career^{‡}
2017–2018	Greece U16	7	(2)
2018–2019	Greece U17	11	(0)
2019	Greece U19	3	(1)
2021–2024	Greece U21	18	(3)
- * Club domestic league appearances and goals as of 19 September 2026 ‡ National team caps and goals as of 27 June 2024

Vasilios Sourlis (Greek: Βασίλειος Σουρλής; born 16 November 2002) is a Greek professional footballer who plays as a midfielder for Super League club Iraklis.

== Career ==
Sourlis started his football career from Olympiacos FC's academy and he later on became a senior team member in 2019 after signing his first contract with the club. He made his debut appearance for the Reds on 15 July 2020, in a game against OFI for the 2019–20 Super League Play-offs, getting subbed on in the place of Maxi Lovera. His next official appearance with the club came in the next season against Panetolikos in a comfortable 3–0 cup win for Olympiacos. In the 2020–21 season, he made three more appearances for the club against AEL, Aris Thessaloniki and Asteras Tripolis. He won the 2020–21 Super League Greece with Olympiacos. At the start of the 2021–22 season, Sourlis scored his first goal for the club in a friendly against FC Krasnodar, which turned out to be the decisive goal that gave Olympiacos the win.

On 27 June 2024, after a year-long stint with Asteras Tripolis, Sourlis was transferred to Polish top-flight club Raków Częstochowa. He signed a two-year contract, with an option for a further two years, and left the club by mutual consent on 18 September 2024, without making a single appearance.

On 26 November 2024, he returned to Greece to join Lamia.

== Career statistics ==
=== Club ===
As of match played 14 June 2026

Appearances and goals by club, season and competition
Club	Season	League			National cup		Europe		Other		Total	
Club	Season	Division	Apps	Goals	Apps	Goals	Apps	Goals	Apps	Goals	Apps	Goals
Olympiacos	2019–20	Super League Greece	1	0	0	0	0	0	0	0	1	0
Olympiacos	2020–21	Super League Greece	3	0	1	0	0	0	0	0	4	0
Olympiacos	2021–22	Super League Greece	4	0	4	0	2 (Note: Appearances in UEFA Champions League)	0	0	0	10	0
Olympiacos	Total		8	0	5	0	2	0	0	0	15	0
Olympiacos B	2021–22	Super League 2	22	4	—		—		—		22	4
Olympiacos B	2022–23	Super League 2	10	1	—		—		—		10	1
Olympiacos B	Total		32	5	—		—		—		32	5
Fortuna Sittard (loan)	2022–23	Eredivisie	2	0	1	0	—		—		3	0
Asteras Tripolis	2023–24	Super League Greece	16	0	3	0	—		—		19	0
Raków Częstochowa	2024–25	Ekstraklasa	0	0	0	0	—		—		0	0
Lamia	2024–25	Super League Greece	17	0	0	0	—		—		17	0
AEL	2025–26	Super League Greece	23	0	4	0	—		—		27	0
Career total			98	5	13	0	2	0	0	0	113	5

== Honours ==
Olympiacos

- Super League Greece: 2019–20, 2020–21, 2021–22
