= Adriano Galliani =

Italian entrepreneur (born 1944)

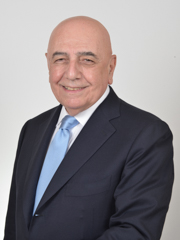
- Galliani in 2018

Member of the Senate
- Incumbent
- Assumed office 30 October 2023
- Constituency: Monza
- In office 23 March 2018 – 13 October 2022
- Constituency: Lombardy

Personal details
- Born: 30 July 1944 (age 82) Monza, Italy
- Party: Forza Italia
- Height: 1.74 m (5 ft 9 in)
- Spouses: unknown first wife; Daniela Rosati (m. 1989; div. 1999) Malika El Hazzazi (m. 2004; div. 2008)
- Children: 3 (Gianluca, Micol, Fabrizio)
- Relatives: Adrian Galliani (grandson)
- Occupation: Entrepreneur
- Known for: Vice Chairman and CEO of A.C. Milan

Adriano Galliani (born 30 July 1944) is an Italian entrepreneur and football executive. He is also a senator for Forza Italia.

He is known for being a former vice-chairman and CEO of AC Milan from 1986 to 2017, a period in the club's history known as the "Silvio Berlusconi era". During his tenure, Milan won five UEFA Champions League and eight Serie A titles among other achievements.

== Career ==
=== AC Milan ===
On 24 March 1986, Galliani became the managing director of Italian football club AC Milan; subsequently, he was also appointed deputy vice president.

In 1991, as Milan was playing Marseille in Stade Vélodrome at the 1990–91 European Cup, the lights went out in the 87th minute. The lights came back on after 15 minutes, but Galliani refused to bring the team back on the pitch, citing concerns about the match being disrupted by TV crews storming the field. Milan was subsequently eliminated from the competition and barred from UEFA competitions for one year, and Galliani himself was suspended from all official functions until July 1993.

In 2002, Galliani became president of the Lega Nazionale Professionisti, and maintained this position during his tenure as Milan president.

From 21 December 2004 to 15 June 2006, he assumed the duties of deputy vice president of Milan following the resignation of Silvio Berlusconi, who was unable to hold the post due to a law governing conflict of interest; at the time, Berlusconi was president of the Council of Ministers of Italy. He held the office again from 8 May 2008 to 13 April 2017.

On 13 April 2017, with the sale of the rossoneri by Fininvest to Rossoneri Sport Investment Lux, Galliani officially ended his career in Milan in which, as CEO, he won 29 trophies in 31 years.

=== Monza ===
In 2018, Galliani became CEO of Monza, a football club from his native town owned by Silvio Berlusconi. In January 2019, he made headlines for completing a total of 30 transfers in just one month.

On 29 May 2022, after beating Pisa in the Serie B promotion play-offs final, Monza secured their first-ever promotion to Serie A.

On 17 November 2022, Galliani's career was recognised with an Executive Career Award at the 2022 Globe Soccer Awards.

On 19 September 2025, following the sale of A.C. Monza to the U.S. investment fund Beckett Layne Ventures, he announced that he would not assume the club's presidency under the new ownership, effectively stepping back from his executive role.

== Personal life ==
In 2011, Galliani was inducted into the Italian Football Hall of Fame. In April 2016, Galliani was one of the prominent Italian individuals to be named in the Panama Papers leak.

Galliani's grandson, Adrian, is a footballer.
