= Messari Al-Mashhari =

Saudi Arabian footballer

Personal information
- Date of birth: 14 January 2002 (age 24)
- Place of birth: Saudi Arabia
- Position: Midfielder

Youth career
- –2021: Al Nassr

Senior career*
Years	Team	Apps	(Gls)
2022–2023	Olympiacos B	2	(0)
2023–2025	Al-Shaeib		
- * Club domestic league appearances and goals as of 16 June 2023

Messari Al-Mashhari (Arabic: مشاري المشهري; born 14 January 2002) is a Saudi Arabian footballer for plays as a midfielder.

== Career ==
Before the second half of 2021–22, Al-Mashhari signed for Greek side Olympiacos B. On 19 February 2022, he debuted for Olympiacos B during a 1–2 loss to AEL (Larissa).

On 15 September 2023, Al-Mashhari joined Saudi Second Division side Al-Shaeib.
