= Georgios Xenitidis =

Greek association footballer

Personal information
- Date of birth: 4 September 1999 (age 27)
- Place of birth: Xanthi, Greece
- Height: 1.75 m (5 ft 9 in)
- Position: Midfielder

Team information
- Current team: Xanthi

Youth career
- 2013–2017: Olympiacos

Senior career*
Years	Team	Apps	(Gls)
2017–2022	Olympiacos	1	(0)
2020–2021	→ Jeunesse Esch (loan)	27	(2)
2021–2022	Olympiacos B	28	(1)
2022–2024	Panetolikos	24	(0)
2024–2025	Kalamata	1	(0)
2025	Niki Volos	12	(0)
2025–2026	Egaleo	1	(1)
2026–	Xanthi		

International career^{‡}
2014–2015	Greece U16	4	(0)
2015–2016	Greece U17	10	(1)
2017–2018	Greece U19	11	(0)
2018	Greece U20	2	(0)
2020	Greece U21	2	(0)
- * Club domestic league appearances and goals as of 21 September 2025 ‡ National team caps and goals as of 13 October 2020

Georgios Xenitidis (Greek: Γεώργιος Ξενιτίδης; born 4 September 1999) is a Greek professional footballer who plays as a midfielder for Gamma Ethniki club Xanthi.

== Honours ==
Olympiacos

- Super League Greece: 2019–20
