= Dimitrios Fytopoulos =

Greek footballer

Personal information
- Full name: Dimitrios Fytopoulos
- Date of birth: 11 February 2000 (age 26)
- Place of birth: Agrinio, Greece
- Height: 1.67 m (5 ft 6 in)
- Position: Attacking midfielder

Team information
- Current team: Fokikos

Youth career
- 2014–2018: Olympiacos
- 2018–2019: Panetolikos

Senior career*
Years	Team	Apps	(Gls)
2019–2022	Panetolikos	9	(0)
2020–2021	→ Doxa Drama (loan)	22	(1)
2022	SV Neuhof	10	(2)
2022–2023	Elassona		
2023	Almyros Gazi		
2023–2024	Ermionida		
2024–2025	Rodos		
2025	Olympiacos Volos		
2025–2026	Lamia		
2026–	Fokikos		
- * Club domestic league appearances and goals as of 15 May 2021

Dimitrios Fytopoulos (Greek: Δημήτριος Φυτόπουλος; born 11 February 2000) is a Greek professional footballer who plays as an attacking midfielder for Gamma Ethniki club Fokikos.
