= Ilias Karargyris =

Greek footballer

Personal information
- Date of birth: 29 June 2002 (age 24)
- Place of birth: Nafplio, Greece
- Height: 1.85 m (6 ft 1 in)
- Position: Goalkeeper

Team information
- Current team: Hellas Syros
- Number: 44

Youth career
- 2016–2021: Olympiacos

Senior career*
Years	Team	Apps	(Gls)
2018–2021	Olympiacos	3	(0)
2021–2022	Olympiacos B	4	(0)
2022–2023	Proodeftiki	8	(0)
2023–2025	Panargiakos	42	(0)
2025–2026	Egaleo	17	(0)
2026–	Hellas Syros	3	(0)

International career^{‡}
2017	Greece U16	2	(0)
2018–2019	Greece U17	4	(0)
- * Club domestic league appearances and goals as of 19 September 2026 ‡ National team caps and goals as of 15 January 2019

Ilias Karargyris (Greek: Ηλίας Καραργύρης; born 29 June 2002) is a Greek professional footballer who plays as a goalkeeper for Super League 2 club Hellas Syros.

== Career ==
Karargyris made his professional debut for Olympiacos in the 2019/20 season against OFI, playing barely 3 minutes after getting subbed on in place of Bobby Allain but still conceding only 2 minutes later. Olympiacos still managed to win 3–1. However, Karargyris had to wait a year in order to make his second appearance, this time against Asteras Tripolis in a Super League 2020/21 Play-Off game in which he was subbed on in the place of Konstantinos Tzolakis in the 83rd minute. This time Karargyris played 7 minutes and he managed to keep his first professional clean sheet after the game ended 0-0.

== Honours ==
=== Club ===
Olympiacos

- Super League Greece: 2019–20, 2020–21, 2021–22
- Greek Cup: 2019–20
