= João Carvalho (footballer, born 1997) =

Portuguese footballer (born 1997)

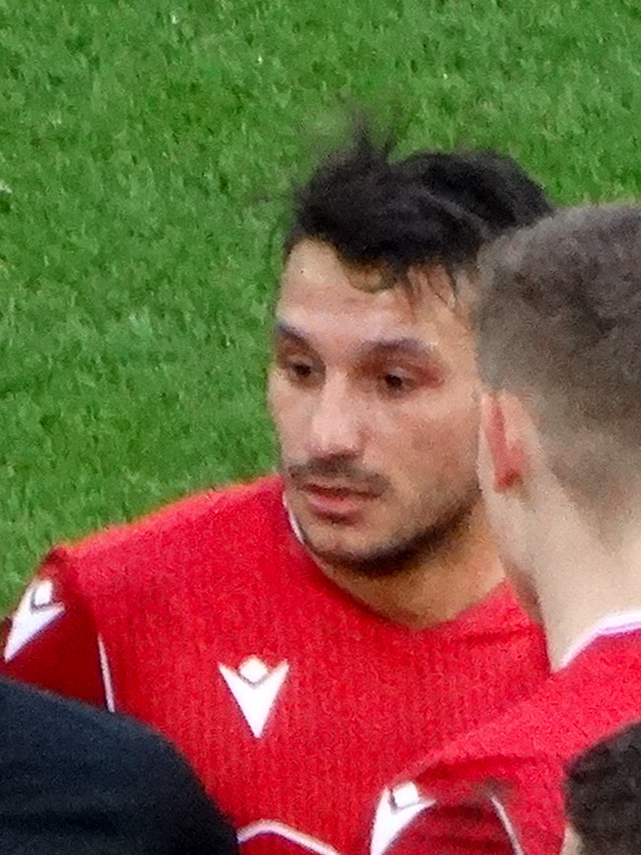
- Carvalho in 2020

Personal information
- Full name: João António Antunes Carvalho
- Date of birth: 9 March 1997 (age 29)
- Place of birth: Castanheira de Pera, Portugal
- Height: 1.72 m (5 ft 8 in)
- Position: Attacking midfielder

Team information
- Current team: Estoril
- Number: 12

Youth career
- 2005–2015: Benfica

Senior career*
Years	Team	Apps	(Gls)
2015–2018	Benfica B	79	(9)
2017–2018	Benfica	7	(0)
2017	→ Vitória Setúbal (loan)	15	(1)
2018–2022	Nottingham Forest	68	(5)
2020–2021	→ Almería (loan)	32	(0)
2022–2024	Olympiacos	32	(3)
2022	Olympiacos B	1	(0)
2022–2023	→ Estoril (loan)	29	(1)
2024–	Estoril	61	(12)

International career
2012	Portugal U15	2	(0)
2012–2013	Portugal U16	8	(0)
2013–2014	Portugal U17	12	(1)
2015	Portugal U18	6	(2)
2015–2016	Portugal U19	11	(1)
2016	Portugal U20	1	(0)
2016–2018	Portugal U21	20	(6)
- * Club domestic league appearances and goals as of 25 May 2026

João António Antunes Carvalho (born 9 March 1997) is a Portuguese professional footballer who plays as an attacking midfielder for Primeira Liga club Estoril, where he is captain.

== Club career ==
=== Benfica ===
Born in Castanheira de Pera, Leiria District, Carvalho joined S.L. Benfica's youth system as an 8-year-old. On 11 January 2015, still a junior, he made his professional debut with their B team, coming on as a late substitute in a 3–2 home win against FC Porto B in the Segunda Liga.

On 8 January 2017, Carvalho scored twice in a 3–2 home victory over Vitória S.C. B. Late in that month, he signed with Vitória F.C. on a half-year loan deal. He made his Primeira Liga debut with the latter on 5 February, replacing João Amaral late into the second half of an eventual 2–1 away loss to F.C. Arouca. He scored his first goal in the competition on 19 March, helping to a 1–1 draw against FC Porto at the Estádio do Dragão.

Carvalho made his competitive debut for Benfica's first team on 14 October 2017, featuring ten minutes in a 1–0 away defeat of S.C. Olhanense in the Taça de Portugal. His UEFA Champions League bow took place on 5 December, when he started the 0–2 group-stage home defeat against FC Basel.

=== Nottingham Forest ===
On 14 June 2018, Carvalho signed a five-year contract with EFL Championship side Nottingham Forest for a club-record transfer fee of £13.2m (€15 million). He scored his first goal for them on 19 September in a 2–1 home win against Sheffield Wednesday, finishing his first season with a further three as well as eight assists in a final ninth position.

Carvalho struggled to make an impact during his second year. Following a pre-season injury, he did make a bright return by scoring a goal in a 3–0 victory over arch-rivals Derby County in the second round of the EFL Cup. However, he was largely limited to substitute appearances by Sabri Lamouchi, making only nine starts as the manager was reportedly frustrated by the player's lack of determination to improve his performances in training when he was left out of the starting eleven.

On 29 September 2020, Carvalho was loaned to UD Almería, with the Spanish Segunda División club having an option to make the deal permanent.

=== Olympiacos ===
On 29 January 2022, Carvalho joined Olympiacos F.C. for an undisclosed fee. He scored in 1–1 Super League Greece home draws against AEK Athens F.C. and PAOK FC, helping his team to win their 47th national championship (third in a row).

=== Estoril ===
Carvalho was loaned to G.D. Estoril Praia for 2022–23. He scored his only goal of the campaign on 15 May 2023, his 40-metre strike in the 2–0 home win over F.C. Arouca ensuring top-flight survival for another year.

On 16 August 2024, Carvalho agreed to a permanent three-year contract.

== International career ==
Carvalho earned 60 caps for Portugal all youth levels comprised. He made his debut with the under-21 team on 6 September 2016, being booked in a 1–0 victory against Greece in Barcelos for the 2017 UEFA European Championship qualifiers. On 11 October, also during that stage, he scored once in the 7–1 away rout of Liechtenstein.

Carvalho appeared in three finals with his country: the 2017 Under-21 Euro, the 2016 European Under-19 Championship and the 2014 European Under-17 Championship.

== Career statistics ==
As of match played 29 May 2024

Appearances and goals by club, season and competition
Club	Season	League			National cup (Note: Includes Taça de Portugal, FA Cup, Copa del Rey, Greek Football Cup)		League cup (Note: Includes Taça da Liga, EFL Cup)		Europe		Other		Total	
Club	Season	Division	Apps	Goals	Apps	Goals	Apps	Goals	Apps	Goals	Apps	Goals	Apps	Goals
Benfica B	2014–15	Segunda Liga	18	1	—		—		—		—		18	1
Benfica B	2015–16	Segunda Liga	37	2	—		—		—		—		37	2
Benfica B	2016–17	Segunda Liga	19	6	—		—		—		—		19	6
Benfica B	2017–18	Segunda Liga	5	0	—		—		—		—		5	0
Benfica B	Total		79	9	—		—		—		—		79	9
Vitória Setúbal (loan)	2016–17	Primeira Liga	15	1	0	0	0	0	—		—		15	1
Benfica	2017–18	Primeira Liga	7	0	0	0	1	0	1 (Note: Appearance in UEFA Champions League)	0	—		9	0
Nottingham Forest	2018–19	Championship	38	4	1	0	1	0	—		—		40	4
Nottingham Forest	2019–20	Championship	23	1	1	0	2	1	—		—		26	2
Nottingham Forest	2020–21	Championship	0	0	0	0	0	0	—		—		0	0
Nottingham Forest	2021–22	Championship	7	0	0	0	1	2	—		—		8	2
Nottingham Forest	Total		68	5	2	0	4	3	—		—		74	8
Almería (loan)	2020–21	Segunda División	32	0	3	0	—		—		1 (Note: Appearance in Segunda División play-offs)	0	36	0
Olympiacos	2021–22	Super League Greece	13	2	3	0	—		0	0	—		16	2
Olympiacos	2022–23	Super League Greece	0	0	0	0	—		1	0	—		1	0
Olympiacos	2023–24	Super League Greece	19	1	2	0	—		8 (Note: Five appearances in UEFA Europa League, three appearances in UEFA Europa Conference League)	0	—		29	1
Olympiacos	Total		32	3	5	0	—		9	0	—		46	3
Olympiacos B	2021–22	Super League Greece 2	1	0	—		—		—		—		1	0
Estoril (loan)	2022–23	Primeira Liga	29	1	2	1	4	1	—		—		35	3
Career total			263	19	12	1	9	4	10	0	2	0	295	24

== Honours ==
Olympiacos

- Super League Greece: 2021–22
- UEFA Conference League: 2023–24
