= Dimitrios Pinakas =

Greek footballer

Personal information
- Date of birth: 1 September 2001 (age 25)
- Place of birth: Larissa, Greece
- Height: 1.78 m (5 ft 10 in)
- Positions: Forward; attacking midfielder

Team information
- Current team: AEL
- Number: 17

Youth career
- 2016–2018: AEL

Senior career*
Years	Team	Apps	(Gls)
2018–2021	AEL	37	(7)
2021–2024	Olympiacos B	54	(8)
2022–2023	→ Apollon Limassol (loan)	4	(1)
2024–2025	Chania	22	(1)
2026–	AEL	0	(0)

International career^{‡}
2018	Greece U18	1	(0)
2021	Greece U21	2	(0)
- * Club domestic league appearances and goals as of 15 June 2025 ‡ National team caps and goals as of 20:00, 5 June 2021 (UTC)

Dimitrios Pinakas (Greek: Δημήτριος Πινακάς; born 1 September 2001) is a Greek professional footballer who plays as an attacking midfielder for Super League 2 club AEL.

== Career ==
=== AEL ===
Pinakas made his professional debut in a home cup game against Irodotos, which ended in a 4–1 win, on 30 October 2018. In the 2019–20 season, he made a total of 9 appearances, making a positive impression.

On 29 July 2020, he signed a new three-year contract with the club, extending his tenure until the summer of 2023.

In the opening game of the 2020–21 season against PAOK, Pinakas came on as a substitute and wore the captain's armband for the first time in his career. After the match, he expressed his gratitude for this honour. On 28 September 2020, he scored his first goal, securing a point for his team just minutes before the final whistle in a 1–1 home draw against Panathinaikos. On 31 October 2020, he scored with a penalty early in the first half, opening the score in a 1–1 away draw against Volos. Four days later, he scored a brace, leading his team to a 2–1 away win against PAS Giannina, their first of the season.

In December 2020, Pinakas scored a temporary equalizer in a 5–1 away defeat against Olympiacos.

=== Olympiacos ===
On 30 August 2021, AEL announced that the sale of Pinakas to Olympiacos for a fee of approximately €1,500,000, with a 15% resale clause.

== Career statistics ==
As of 1 October 2022

Club	Season	League			Cup		Continental		Other		Total	
Club	Season	Division	Apps	Goals	Apps	Goals	Apps	Goals	Apps	Goals	Apps	Goals
AEL	2018–19	Super League Greece	0	0	1	0	—		—		1	0
AEL	2019–20	Super League Greece	8	0	1	0	—		—		9	0
AEL	2020–21	Super League Greece	29	7	2	0	—		—		31	7
AEL	Total		37	7	4	0	—		—		41	7
Olympiacos B	2021–22	Super League Greece 2	22	5	—		—		—		22	5
Apollon Limassol (loan)	2022–23	Cypriot First Division	4	1	0	0	0	0	—		4	1
Career total			63	13	4	0	0	0	—		67	13
