= Stephen Hammond (footballer) =

Ghanaian association football player (born 1996)

Personal information
- Full name: Stephen Kwabena Hammond
- Date of birth: 6 August 1996 (age 30)
- Place of birth: Accra, Ghana
- Height: 1.70 m (5 ft 7 in)
- Position: Central midfielder

Team information
- Current team: Niki Volos
- Number: 5

Youth career
- RCD Mallorca

Senior career*
Years	Team	Apps	(Gls)
2015–2016	Leganés B	0	(0)
2015–2016	→ RCD Mallorca B (loan)	0	(0)
2016–2019	RCD Mallorca B	55	(5)
2019–2021	Doxa Drama	33	(1)
2021–2026	Levadiakos	73	(2)
2024–2026	→ Iraklis (loan)	40	(0)
2026–	Niki Volos	0	(0)
- * Club domestic league appearances and goals as of April 1, 2026

Stephen Kwabena Hammond (born 6 August 1996) is a Ghanaian professional association football player who plays as a central midfielder for Super League Greece 2 club Niki Volos.

== Career statistics ==
As of 1 April 2026

Club	Season	League			Cup		Continental		Other		Total	
Club	Season	Division	Apps	Goals	Apps	Goals	Apps	Goals	Apps	Goals	Apps	Goals
Doxa Drama	2019–20	Superleague Greece 2	14	1	0	0	—		—		14	1
Doxa Drama	2020–21	Superleague Greece 2	19	0	0	0	—		—		19	0
Doxa Drama	Total		33	1	0	0	—		—		33	1
Levadiakos	2021–22	Superleague Greece 2	27	1	5	0	—		—		32	1
Levadiakos	2022–23	Superleague Greece	26	1	1	0	—		—		27	1
Levadiakos	2023–24	Superleague Greece 2	20	0	3	0	—		—		23	0
Levadiakos	Total		73	2	9	0	—		—		82	2
Iraklis (loan)	2024–25	Superleague Greece 2	21	0	1	0	—		—		22	0
Iraklis (loan)	2025–26	Superleague Greece 2	20	0	2	0	—		—		22	0
Iraklis (loan)	Total		41	0	3	0	—		—		44	0
Career Total			147	3	12	0	0	0	0	0	159	3

== Honours ==
=== Levadiakos ===
- Super League Greece 2
  - Winners (2): 2021–22, 2023–24
