= Adrian Galliani =

American soccer player (born 2001)

Personal information
- Date of birth: April 28, 2001 (age 25)
- Place of birth: New York City, U.S.
- Height: 5 ft 11 in (1.80 m)
- Positions: Defender; midfielder

Team information
- Current team: Thermaikos

Youth career
- Reading
- 2015–2019: AC Milan
- 2018–2019: IMG Academy
- 2019–2020: Watford
- 2020–2021: Nottingham Forest

Senior career*
Years	Team	Apps	(Gls)
2021–2022	Olympiacos B	1	(0)
2022	→ Panionios (loan)		
2023	Villarrubia	1	(0)
2024–2025	Baynounah	0	(0)
2025–2026	Anorthosis Mouttagiakas		
2026–	Thermaikos		
- * Club domestic league appearances and goals as of January 12, 2021

Adrian Galliani (born April 28, 2001) is an American professional soccer player who plays as a defender or a midfielder.

== Career ==
As a youth player, Galliani joined the academy of English second-tier side Reading. After that, he joined the youth academy of AC Milan in the Italian Serie A. In 2018, he joined American club IMG Academy. Before the second half of 2019–20, Galliani joined the youth academy of Nottingham Forest in the English second tier.

In 2021, he signed for Greek team Olympiacos B. On 12 January 2021, he debuted for Olympiacos B in a 2–1 loss to Thesprotos.

== Personal life ==
Galliani is the grandson of former AC Milan chairman and current Monza CEO Adriano Galliani.
