= Diby Keita =

Malian footballer

Personal information
- Full name: Diby Keita Kone
- Date of birth: 8 July 2003 (age 23)
- Place of birth: Toledo, Spain
- Height: 1.81 m (5 ft 11 in)
- Position: Winger

Team information
- Current team: Krasava ENY Ypsonas FC
- Number: 21

Youth career
- 2015–2016: Rayo Vallecano
- 2016–2022: Real Madrid

Senior career*
Years	Team	Apps	(Gls)
2022–2024	Olympiacos B	14	(2)
2024–2025	Olympiacos	0	(0)
2025	→ Egaleo (loan)	3	(1)
2025–2026	Olympiacos B	18	(2)
2026-	Krasava ENY Ypsonas FC	6	(0)

International career^{‡}
2022	Mali U20	1	(0)
- * Club domestic league appearances and goals as of 1 March 2026 ‡ National team caps and goals as of 5 September 2022

Diby Keita Kone (born 8 July 2003) is a professional footballer who plays as a winger for Cypriot First Division club Krasava ENY Ypsonas FC. Born in Spain, he played for Mali at youth level.

== Career ==
=== Olympiacos B ===
On 31 January 2022, Keita signed a contract with Greek Super League 2 club Olympiacos B until the summer of 2026.
