= Almir Klica =

Montenegrin footballer (born 1998)

Personal information
- Date of birth: 10 November 1998 (age 28)
- Place of birth: Montenegro
- Height: 1.68 m (5 ft 6 in)
- Position: Left-back

Team information
- Current team: Mondorf-les-Bains

Senior career*
Years	Team	Apps	(Gls)
2018–2021	Jeunesse Esch	64	(7)
2022	Olympiacos B	2	(0)
2022–2026	Jeunesse Esch	86	(8)
2026–	Mondorf-les-Bains	4	(0)
- * Club domestic league appearances and goals as of 23 August 2026

Almir Klica (born 10 November 1998) is a Montenegrin professional footballer who plays as a left-back for Luxembourgish club Mondorf-les-Bains.

== Career ==
Klica started his career with Luxembourgish side Jeunesse. Before the second half of 2021–22, he signed for Olympiacos B in Greece. On 19 February 2022, Klica debuted for Olympiacos B during a 1–2 loss to Larissa.
