= Olympiacos F.C. B =

Association football team in Greece

Olympiacos B
- Full name: Olympiacos Football Club B
- Founded: 2021; 5 years ago
- Ground: Rentis Training Centre
- Capacity: 3,000
- President: Evangelos Marinakis
- Coach: Álvaro Rubio
- League: Super League Greece 2
- 2025–26: Super League Greece 2 (South Group), 4th
- Website: olympiacos.org
| Home colours | Away colours | Third colours |

Olympiacos Football Club B, or simply Olympiacos B (Greek: Ολυμπιακός Β), is the reserve team of Greek club Olympiacos. It competes in the Super League Greece 2. It was founded in 2021.

== Stadium ==
The stadium that hosts Olympiacos B is the Rentis Training Centre with a capacity of 3,000.

== Players ==
=== Current squad ===
As of 9 September 2026

Note: Flags indicate national team as defined under FIFA eligibility rules; some limited exceptions apply. Players may hold more than one non-FIFA nationality.

| No. | Pos. | Nation | Player |
|---|---|---|---|
| 26 | FW | EGY | Bilal Mazhar |
| 33 | DF | GRE | Nikos Gotzamanidis (captain) |
| 50 | DF | GRE | Konstantinos Tanoulis |
| 54 | DF | GRE | Dimitrios Retsos |
| 55 | MF | GRE | Christos Liatsos |
| 57 | MF | NGR | Taiye Yusuf |
| 58 | MF | GRE | Nektarios Alafakis |
| 61 | GK | GRE | Georgios Kouraklis |
| 62 | MF | ALB | Antonis Dama |
| 65 | MF | GRE | Petros Kolokotronis |
| 67 | MF | GRE | Christos Kapellas |
| 72 | DF | GRE | Athanasios Koutsogoulas |
| 74 | FW | GRE | Panagiotis Santis |

| No. | Pos. | Nation | Player |
|---|---|---|---|
| 75 | DF | GRE | Georgios Siozios |
| 76 | GK | GRE | Alexandros Tsompanidis |
| 77 | MF | GRE | Christos Filis |
| 78 | MF | GRE | Christos Darviras |
| 79 | MF | GRE | Nikos Zouglis |
| 80 | DF | GRE | Apostolos Martinis |
| 81 | FW | GRE | Konstantinos Angelakis |
| 82 | DF | GRE | Vasilios Karkatsalis |
| 83 | MF | UKR | Konstantin Plish |
| 86 | GK | GRE | Anastasios Kampagiovanis |
| 87 | MF | GRE | Diamanti Legisi |
| 88 | DF | GRE | Nikos Avramoulis |
| 89 | MF | GRE | Paschalis Toufakis |
| 92 | GK | GRE | Iason Georgakopoulos |
| 93 | MF | BRA | Giuliano |
| 98 | DF | GRE | Giannis Rolakis |

=== Out on loan ===
Note: Flags indicate national team as defined under FIFA eligibility rules; some limited exceptions apply. Players may hold more than one non-FIFA nationality.

| No. | Pos. | Nation | Player |
|---|---|---|---|
| — | MF | GRE | Argyris Liatsikouras (at Kalamata until 30 June 2027) |

== Coach and staff ==
Ariel Ibagaza was appointed the coach in July 2021, with former Nottingham Forest youth coach Guilherme Ramos appointed his assistant in August 2021. Álvaro Rubio is the current coach.

== Dissolution and reconstitution ==
In the season 2023–24 of Super League 2, Olympiacos B finished 10th hence was relegated to Gamma Ethniki, the third highest football league in Greece. However, clubs in Gamma Ethniki can only consist of amateur players since it's an amateur division, hence no professional players can play in the reserve team of Olympiakos which was the case in the past for players like Youssef El Arabi, Kostas Fortounis etc. and young players like Apostolopoulos.

However, following statements by Olympiacos F.C. vice president Kostas Karapapas, and following an invitation from the organizing authority, the second team would eventually return to the Super League 2 in the 2025–26 season.
