= List of Belarusian football transfers summer 2025 =

This is a list of Belarusian football transfers in the 2025 summer transfer window by club. Only clubs of the 2025 Belarusian Premier League are included.

== Belarusian Premier League 2025 ==
=== Arsenal Dzerzhinsk ===
In:

No.	Pos.	Nation	Player
9	FW	BLR	Dmitry Vashkevich (from Molodechno)
17	FW	BLR	Mark Mokin (on loan from (Russia) Baltika Kaliningrad)
19	FW	BLR	Aleksandr Frantsuzov (on loan from (Russia) Lokomotiv Moscow, previously to the same club)
46	DF	RUS	Vladislav Vasilyev (from (Russia) Murom)
55	MF	BLR	Nikita Kaplenko (from (Kazakhstan) Atyrau)
80	MF	RUS	Mikhail Shchetinin (from (Russia) Lokomotiv Moscow, previously on loan to (Russia) Fakel Voronezh)

Out:

No.	Pos.	Nation	Player
7	FW	BLR	Aleksandr Shvedchikov (end of loan from BATE Borisov)
9	FW	BLR	Ruslan Myalkovsky (end of loan from (Russia) Lokomotiv Moscow)
15	MF	BLR	Yaroslav Oreshkevich
22	DF	BRA	Átila Guilherme (to (Moldova) Sheriff Tiraspol)
23	MF	TJK	Salokhiddin Irgashev (to (Tajikistan) Ravshan Kulob)
31	GK	RUS	Daniil Polyansky (to (Armenia) Pyunik)
81	DF	BLR	Gleb Yakushevich (end of loan from (Russia) Shinnik Yaroslavl)
88	MF	BLR	Kirill Kirilenko (to (Moldova) Zimbru Chișinău)
—	FW	BLR	Ilya Gubarevich (on loan to ABFF U-19, previously from the same club)

=== BATE Borisov ===
In:

No.	Pos.	Nation	Player
3	DF	BLR	Artsyom Rakhmanaw (from Dynamo Brest)
4	FW	BLR	Aleksandr Shvedchikov (end of loan to Arsenal Dzerzhinsk)
6	DF	FRA	Ayk Musakhanyan (from (Armenia) Alashkert)
22	FW	BLR	Vladislav Yatskevich (on loan from Ostrovets)
66	DF	BLR	Arseny Ageyev (on loan from (Russia) Lokomotiv Moscow, previously on loan to Torpedo-BelAZ Zhodino)

Out:

No.	Pos.	Nation	Player
4	DF	RUS	Aleksandr Martynov (to (Turkey) Serikspor)
8	MF	MDA	Igor Costrov (to (Moldova) Steaua Nordului)
9	MF	BLR	Aleksandr Anufriyev (to Slutsk)
10	MF	CIV	Rayan Guibero (to (Slovakia) Trenčín)
17	MF	CIV	Donald Dongo (to (Azerbaijan) Kapaz)
19	DF	BLR	Vladislav Lyakh (to (Russia) Spartak Kostroma)
28	MF	BLR	Kirill Chernook (on loan to Slavia Mozyr)

=== Dynamo Brest ===
In:

No.	Pos.	Nation	Player
10	MF	BLR	Dmitry Lisakovich (from Minsk)
14	MF	SRB	Filip Jović (from (Serbia) Napredak Kruševac)
22	DF	BLR	Aleksandr Pavlovets (from Ararat-Armenia)
25	MF	UZB	Sherzod Esanov (from (Russia) Akron Tolyatti)
47	FW	BLR	Timofey Martynov (on loan from (Russia) Orenburg)
49	GK	BLR	Artyom Karatay (on loan from Dinamo Minsk)
77	DF	BLR	Roman Yuzepchuk (from (Russia) Khimki, previously on loan to (Russia) Sokol Saratov)

Out:

No.	Pos.	Nation	Player
5	DF	BLR	Yegor Khralenkov (on loan to Slutsk)
10	MF	KAZ	Vladislav Vasilyev (to (Kazakhstan) Irtysh Pavlodar)
12	DF	BLR	Denis Gruzhevsky (to (Russia) Dynamo Bryansk)
22	MF	LBR	David Tweh (to Isloch Minsk Raion)
23	MF	BLR	Artyom Turich (to Minsk)
33	DF	BLR	Artsyom Rakhmanaw (to BATE Borisov)
42	MF	BLR	Nikita Burak (on loan to Slutsk)
51	FW	BLR	Denis Laptev (to Gomel)
—	MF	BLR	Matvey Dukso (on loan to Smorgon, previously on loan to Molodechno)
—	MF	BLR	Aleksandr Fisyuk (to Agro-Pelishche, previously on loan to Niva Dolbizno)
—	MF	BLR	Dmitry Lesnyak (on loan to Volna Pinsk, previously on loan to Molodechno)

=== Dinamo Minsk ===
In:

No.	Pos.	Nation	Player
8	MF	RUS	Ruslan Chobanov (on loan from (Russia) Krasnodar, previously on loan to (Russia) Veles Moscow)
9	FW	BRA	Fernando Victor (from (Bahrain) Manama Club)
19	MF	BLR	Dmitry Podstrelov (from (Albania) Partizani Tirana)
22	GK	RUS	Ivan Konovalov (from (Azerbaijan) Turan Tovuz)
37	MF	BLR	Vladislav Krolik (end of loan to Molodechno)
42	MF	NGA	Fawaz Abdullahi (from (Russia) Khimki)
49	MF	BLR	Andrey Denisyuk (from Minsk)

Out:

No.	Pos.	Nation	Player
2	DF	BLR	Vadim Pigas (to (Russia) Pari Nizhny Novgorod)
3	DF	RUS	Ilya Kalachyov (to (Russia) Spartak Kostroma)
5	DF	BLR	Pavel Apetenok (to (Greece) PAOK B)
9	FW	MNE	Dušan Bakić (to (Russia) Torpedo Moscow)
16	MF	BLR	Daniil Silinsky (end of loan from Gomel)
49	GK	BLR	Artyom Karatay (on loan to Dynamo Brest)
90	DF	BLR	Mikhail Aleksandrov (on loan to Gomel)
—	FW	BLR	Maksim Budko (on loan to Smorgon, previously on loan to Molodechno)
—	MF	BLR	Timur Dubovik (on loan to Smorgon)
—	MF	BLR	Yegor Isachenko (on loan to Ostrovets)
—	FW	BLR	Matvey Kalinovsky (on loan to Ostrovets, previously on loan to Orsha)
—	MF	BLR	Viktor Lisovsky (on loan to Energetik-BGU Minsk)
—	DF	BLR	Aleksandr Martysevich (on loan to Niva Dolbizno)
—	MF	BLR	Artyom Samuylik (on loan to Volna Pinsk)

=== Gomel ===
In:

No.	Pos.	Nation	Player
10	FW	BLR	Denis Laptev (from Dynamo Brest)
11	FW	BLR	Timofey Simanenka (from Minsk)
14	MF	NGA	Raymond Adeola (from (Greece) Asteras Tripolis)
19	MF	BLR	Daniil Silinsky (end of loan to Dinamo Minsk)
56	DF	RUS	Sergei Loskutov (from (Russia) Ural Yekaterinburg, previously on loan to (Russia) Volgar Astrakhan)
68	DF	BLR	Mikhail Aleksandrov (on loan from Dinamo Minsk)

Out:

No.	Pos.	Nation	Player
7	MF	BRA	Fernando Neto (to (Moldova) Sheriff Tiraspol)
10	MF	BLR	Dzmitry Baradzin (to Torpedo-BelAZ Zhodino)
11	FW	BLR	Alyaksandr Butsko (to Molodechno)
14	MF	BLR	Roman Davyskiba (to Molodechno)
17	DF	BLR	Vladislav Yatskevich (to Minsk)
19	DF	FRA	Souleymane Fofana
25	MF	CIV	Samuel Eda (to (Armenia) Sardarapat)
70	FW	RUS	Kirill Cheburakov (end of loan from (Russia) Rostov)
—	MF	BLR	Vladislav Drapeza (to Belshina Bobruisk)

=== Isloch Minsk Raion ===
In:

No.	Pos.	Nation	Player
2	MF	LBR	David Tweh (from Dynamo Brest)
5	MF	BLR	Sergey Volkov (from (Russia) Kuban Krasnodar)
35	GK	BLR	Vladislav Drozd (from Belshina Bobruisk)
55	DF	RUS	Vadim Konyukhov (from (Russia) Veles Moscow)

Out:

No.	Pos.	Nation	Player
7	MF	BLR	Gleb Rovdo (to (Slovakia) Slávia TU Košice)
33	GK	BLR	Oleg Diva (to Molodechno)
77	FW	KAZ	Denis Mitrofanov (to (Kazakhstan) Ulytau)
89	DF	BLR	Kirill Yankovskiy (to Vitebsk)
—	FW	BLR	Vladislav Gizhevsky (to Slonim-2017, previously on loan to Lokomotiv Gomel)

=== Maxline Vitebsk ===
In:

No.	Pos.	Nation	Player
21	MF	RUS	Nikita Glushkov (from (Russia) Baltika Kaliningrad, previously on loan)
22	FW	RUS	Abu-Said Eldarushev (on loan from (Russia) Baltika Kaliningrad)
27	MF	SRB	Aleksandar Mesarović (from (Serbia) Novi Pazar)
66	DF	BLR	Sergey Karpovich (from (Uzbekistan) Navbahor)
77	MF	BLR	Alfred Mazurich (on loan from Neman Grodno)
90	FW	BLR	Dmitry Antilevsky (from (Israel) Hapoel Haifa)

Out:

No.	Pos.	Nation	Player
15	FW	BLR	Denis Kozlovskiy (to (Moldova) Zimbru Chișinău)
33	FW	BRA	Rafael Reis (to (Brazil) Santo André)
77	MF	SEN	Honore Gomis (to (Georgia (country)) Dinamo Tbilisi)
80	FW	BLR	Denis Ovsyannikov (to (Cyprus) Aris Limassol)
—	MF	BLR	Andrey Khachaturyan (retired)

=== Minsk ===
In:

No.	Pos.	Nation	Player
3	DF	BLR	Artyom Sokol (from (Indonesia) Persikabo 1973)
6	DF	KOR	Park Ji-hun
10	FW	NGA	Charles Mark Ikechukwu (from (Saudi Arabia) Al-Salam)
14	MF	KGZ	Emir Ernisov (from (Kyrgyzstan) Alga Bishkek)
15	DF	BLR	Vladislav Yatskevich (from Gomel)
23	MF	BLR	Artyom Turich (from Dynamo Brest)
91	DF	BLR	Pavel Nazarenko
—	FW	BLR	Ilya Bondarenko (end of loan to Ostrovets)

Out:

No.	Pos.	Nation	Player
3	DF	BLR	Ruslan Khadarkevich (to (Kazakhstan) Atyrau)
9	FW	BLR	Semen Penchuk (on loan to Baranovichi)
10	MF	BLR	Dmitry Lisakovich (to Dynamo Brest)
11	FW	BLR	Timofey Simanenka (to Gomel)
44	MF	BLR	Mikita Ramanaw (to (Russia) Rostov-2)
49	MF	BLR	Andrey Denisyuk (to Dinamo Minsk)
66	DF	COL	Francisco Campo
99	MF	KGZ	Gulzhigit Borubayev (to Neman Grodno)

=== Molodechno ===
In:

No.	Pos.	Nation	Player
4	DF	RUS	Roman Khadzhiev (from (Russia) Torpedo Vladimir)
6	DF	BLR	Vladislav Belashevich (from Ostrovets)
7	FW	RUS	Timur Galimzyanov (from (Autonomous Republic of Crimea) Ocean Kerch)
10	FW	BLR	Alyaksandr Butsko (from Gomel)
20	FW	RUS	Artur Sagitov (from (Russia) Murom)
22	DF	BLR	Aleksandr Voronovich (from Krumkachy Minsk)
23	MF	RUS	Aleks Radzhabov (from (Russia) Dinamo Kirov)
25	DF	RUS	Nikita Lysenko (from (Kyrgyzstan) Bars Issyk-Kul)
37	MF	BLR	Roman Davyskiba (from Gomel)
43	GK	BLR	Oleg Diva (from Isloch Minsk Raion)
44	MF	RUS	Nikita Shelest (from (Russia) Zhemchuzhina Sochi)
77	MF	SRB	Andrej Đukić (from (Serbia) Sloboda Užice)
91	MF	GAB	Jean-Paul Assoumou Mba (from (Azerbaijan) Zagatala)

Out:

No.	Pos.	Nation	Player
6	FW	BLR	Maksim Budko (end of loan from Dinamo Minsk)
7	MF	BLR	Pavel Tseslyukevich (to Bumprom Gomel)
10	FW	BLR	Dmitry Vashkevich (to Arsenal Dzerzhinsk)
17	DF	BLR	Artur Kats (to Unixlabs)
20	MF	NGA	Abdulaziz Laval (to Orsha)
22	MF	BLR	Matvey Dukso (end of loan from Dynamo Brest)
22	MF	SRB	Luka Stevanović (to (Azerbaijan) Baku Sportinq, previously from the same club)
23	FW	BLR	Igor Monich (to Niva Dolbizno)
25	FW	BLR	Yevgeniy Azersky (to Ostrovets)
37	MF	BLR	Vladislav Krolik (end of loan from Dinamo Minsk)
43	GK	BLR	Denis Sadovsky (to Bumprom Gomel)
44	DF	BLR	Artyom Dylevsky (to Ostrovets)
77	DF	KAZ	Arsen Azatov (to (Kazakhstan) AKAS)
91	MF	BLR	Dmitry Lesnyak (end of loan from Dynamo Brest)

=== Naftan Novopolotsk ===
In:

No.	Pos.	Nation	Player
19	FW	TJK	Alisher Rakhimov (from Smorgon)
92	MF	BLR	Kirill Leonovich (from Vitebsk)

Out:

No.	Pos.	Nation	Player
9	MF	BLR	Artyom Kuratnik (to Niva Dolbizno)
14	FW	BLR	Yegor Shedko (on loan to Ostrovets)
19	MF	BLR	Vladislav Kabyshev (to Dnepr Mogilev)
77	DF	BLR	Artemiy Litvinov (to Polotsk-2019)
92	DF	RUS	Artyom Shchadin
—	DF	BLR	Vladimir Bashun (to Orsha)

=== Neman Grodno ===
In:

No.	Pos.	Nation	Player
30	MF	ALB	Valon Ahmedi (from (North Macedonia) Rabotnicki)
99	MF	KGZ	Gulzhigit Borubayev (from Minsk)

Out:

No.	Pos.	Nation	Player
5	DF	BLR	Yegor Parkhomenko (to (Bulgaria) CSKA 1948 Sofia)
16	DF	BLR	Nikita Bylinkin (to Slutsk)
21	MF	BLR	Alfred Mazurich (on loan to Maxline Vitebsk)
—	MF	BLR	Sergey Guzarevich (on loan to Lida)

=== Slavia Mozyr ===
In:

No.	Pos.	Nation	Player
11	FW	RUS	Ivan Gulko (on loan from (Russia) Orenburg, previously from (Russia) Tyumen)
17	MF	BLR	Kirill Chernook (on loan from BATE Borisov)
21	MF	BLR	Kirill Kirilenko (from (Moldova) Zimbru Chișinău)
33	DF	BLR	Yaroslav Makushinsky (from Vitebsk)

Out:

No.	Pos.	Nation	Player
11	FW	MDA	Andrei Cobeț (to (Moldova) Milsami Orhei)
17	FW	CIV	Lamah Bamba (to Smorgon)
59	MF	BLR	Nikolay Ryabykh (on loan to Baranovichi)
93	FW	RUS	Mikhail Markin (to (Russia) Irtysh Omsk)
—	MF	KGZ	Ermek Kenzhebayev (on loan to (Kyrgyzstan) Alga Bishkek, previously on loan to (Kyrgyzstan) Bars Issyk-Kul)

=== Slutsk ===
In:

No.	Pos.	Nation	Player
4	MF	BLR	Nikita Burak (on loan from Dynamo Brest)
7	DF	BLR	Yegor Khralenkov (on loan from Dynamo Brest)
11	MF	RUS	Nikita Khrisanfov (from (Russia) Ural-2 Yekaterinburg)
17	MF	BLR	Aleksandr Anufriyev (from BATE Borisov)
45	FW	BIH	Nemanja Dragutinović (from (Bosnia and Herzegovina) Rudar Prijedor)
55	DF	BLR	Nikita Bylinkin (from Neman Grodno)

Out:

No.	Pos.	Nation	Player
7	FW	UZB	Amirbek Bakayev (to (Uzbekistan) Olympic Tashkent)
11	MF	BLR	Fyodor Lebedev (to Baranovichi)
17	FW	BLR	Ilya Tishurov (on loan to Volna Pinsk)
35	GK	BLR	Matvey Kovruk (to Ostrovets)
44	DF	BLR	Igor Tymonyuk (to (Russia) Saturn Ramenskoye)

=== Smorgon ===
In:

No.	Pos.	Nation	Player
15	MF	BLR	Yegor Babich (from Unixlabs)
16	GK	BLR	Vladislav Vasilyuchek
17	MF	BLR	Matvey Dukso (on loan from Dynamo Brest, previously on loan to Molodechno)
18	DF	NGA	Hamisu Suleiman Aliyu
25	FW	CIV	Lamah Bamba (from Slavia Mozyr)
33	DF	BLR	Alikhan Fazylov (from Unixlabs)
55	MF	BLR	Timur Dubovik (on loan from Dinamo Minsk)
91	FW	BLR	Maksim Budko (on loan from Dinamo Minsk, previously on loan to Molodechno)
—	DF	BLR	Artem Glotko (from Energetik-BGU Minsk)

Out:

No.	Pos.	Nation	Player
1	GK	BLR	Aleksey Koltygin (to (Poland) MKS Piaseczno)
10	FW	UZB	Saidumar Sodiqov (to (Kyrgyzstan) OshSU-Aldier)
11	FW	BLR	Danila Slesarchuk (retired)
16	GK	BLR	Dmitry Say (retired)
26	DF	CIV	Koffi Bini
63	FW	TJK	Alisher Rakhimov (to Naftan Novopolotsk)

=== Torpedo-BelAZ Zhodino ===
In:

No.	Pos.	Nation	Player
13	MF	BLR	Vladislav Klimovich (from (Hungary) Diósgyőr)
18	MF	BLR	Dzmitry Baradzin (from Gomel)
29	FW	NGA	Steven Alfred (from (Russia) Shinnik Yaroslavl)
90	DF	SRB	Nenad Perović (from (Serbia) Mladost Lučani, previously on loan to (Serbia) Vršac)
—	DF	BLR	Eduard Korostelyov (end of loan to Lokomotiv Gomel)

Out:

No.	Pos.	Nation	Player
11	MF	BRA	Caio Dantas (end of loan from (Russia) Torpedo Moscow)
21	MF	BLR	Timofey Sharkovsky (to (Moldova) Zimbru Chișinău)
66	DF	BLR	Arseny Ageyev (end of loan from (Russia) Lokomotiv Moscow)
72	MF	RUS	Aleksandr Orekhov (end of loan from (Russia) Torpedo Moscow)

=== Vitebsk ===
In:

No.	Pos.	Nation	Player
4	FW	BLR	Valery Gorbachik (from (Russia) Chelyabinsk)
28	DF	BLR	Kirill Yankovskiy (from Isloch Minsk Raion)

Out:

No.	Pos.	Nation	Player
8	MF	BLR	Yan Mosesov (retired)
10	MF	BLR	Kirill Leonovich (to Naftan Novopolotsk)
11	FW	CIV	Cédric Khaleb Kouadio
33	DF	BLR	Yaroslav Makushinsky (to Slavia Mozyr)
