= 2025 UEFA European Under-21 Championship qualification Group G =

Group G of the 2025 UEFA European Under-21 Championship qualifying competition consists of six teams: Portugal, Croatia, Greece, Belarus, Faroe Islands, and Andorra. The composition of the nine groups in the qualifying group stage was decided by the draw held on 2 February 2023 at the UEFA headquarters in Nyon, Switzerland, with the teams seeded according to their coefficient ranking.

== Standings ==
Pos	Team	Pld	W	D	L	GF	GA	GD	Pts	Qualification	Portugal	Croatia	Greece	Faroe Islands	Belarus	Andorra
1	Portugal	10	9	0	1	33	6	+27	27	Final tournament	—	5–1	2–0	4–0	6–1	3–0
2	Croatia	10	7	1	2	20	14	+6	22	Play-offs	0–2	—	3–2	2–1	2–0	2–0
3	Greece	10	5	2	3	16	10	+6	17		2–1	2–2	—	3–0	1–1	1–0
4	Faroe Islands	10	3	1	6	11	24	−13	10		1–3	2–4	0–4	—	1–0	2–2
5	Belarus	10	1	3	6	6	20	−14	6		0–5	0–1	1–0	2–3	—	0–0
6	Andorra	10	0	3	7	4	16	−12	3		1–2	0–3	0–1	0–1	1–1	—

Source: UEFA
Rules for classification: Tiebreakers

== Matches ==
Times are CET/CEST, (Note: CEST (UTC+2) for dates between 26 March and 29 October 2023 and between 31 March and 27 October 2024, and CET (UTC+1) for all other dates.) as listed by UEFA (local times, if different, are in parentheses).

24 March 2023
13:00 (16:00 AMT)

Belarus	0–0	Andorra
	Report

Armavir City Stadium, Armavir (Armenia) (Note: Due to the country's involvement in the Russian invasion of Ukraine, Belarusian teams were required to play their home matches at neutral venues and behind closed doors until further notice.)
Attendance: 0
Referee: Filip Glova (Slovakia)

28 March 2023
16:00 (17:00 EEST)

Greece	1–1	Belarus
Tzolis 11'	Report	Kasarab 53'

Leoforos Alexandras Stadium, Athens
Attendance: 150
Referee: Sigurd Kringstad (Norway)

16 June 2023
19:00 (18:00 WEST)

Faroe Islands	2–2	Andorra
Nielsen 13' (pen.); Dahl-Olsen 74'	Report	Solà 22'; Rodrigo 58'

Við Djúpumýrar, Klaksvík
Attendance: 1,061
Referee: David Munro (Scotland)

20 June 2023
20:00

Andorra	1–1	Belarus
Rosas 58'	Report	Zinovich 65' (pen.)

Estadi Nacional, Andorra la Vella
Attendance: 533
Referee: Tom Owen (Wales)

7 September 2023
15:30 (17:30 AMT)

Belarus	2–3	Faroe Islands
Rovdo 73'; Yakushevich 90+3'	Report	Nielsen 35', 48', 59'

Armavir City Stadium, Armavir (Armenia)
Attendance: 0
Referee: Ashot Ghaltakhchyan (Armenia)

8 September 2023
18:30 (17:30 WEST)

Portugal	3–0	Andorra
Araújo 32'; Silva 60'; Tomás 71'	Report

Estádio da Mata Real, Paços de Ferreira
Attendance: 2,203
Referee: Jochem Kamphuis (Netherlands)

12 September 2023
15:00 (17:00 AMT)

Belarus	0–5	Portugal
	Report	Silva 9', 34' (pen.); Araújo 26'; Marques 44'; Gomes 89'

Armavir City Stadium, Armavir (Armenia)
Attendance: 0
Referee: Antoni Bandić (Bosnia and Herzegovina)
12 September 2023
19:00

Andorra	0–1	Greece
	Report	Tzolis 49'

Estadi Nacional, Andorra la Vella
Attendance: 506
Referee: Jamie Robinson (Northern Ireland)
12 September 2023
19:00 (18:00 WEST)

Faroe Islands	2–4	Croatia
Dahl-Olsen 78', 85'	Report	Šimić 17'; Hodža 44'; Beljo 75'; Ljubičić 90+2'

Við Djúpumýrar, Klaksvík
Attendance: 1,118
Referee: Jérémy Muller (Luxembourg)

13 October 2023
16:00 (17:00 EEST)

Greece	2–2	Croatia
Sourlis 11'; Koutsias 89'	Report	Hodža 23'; Ljubičić 67'

Theodoros Kolokotronis Stadium, Tripoli
Attendance: 1,250
Referee: Tom Owen (Wales)
13 October 2023
18:30 (17:30 WEST)

Portugal	6–1	Belarus
Veiga 11'; Silva 34'; Conceição 41'; Bernardo 59'; Fernandes 80'; Gomes 87'	Report	Kasarab 25'

Estádio Cidade de Barcelos, Barcelos
Attendance: 1,627
Referee: Lazar Lukić (Serbia)

17 October 2023
17:30

Croatia	2–0	Belarus
Sučić 45+1' (pen.); Baturina 55'	Report

Stadion Radnik, Velika Gorica
Attendance: 584
Referee: Igor Stojchevski (North Macedonia)
17 October 2023
20:00

Andorra	0–1	Faroe Islands
	Report	Bárðarson 31'

Estadi Nacional, Andorra la Vella
Attendance: 522
Referee: Denys Shurman (Ukraine)
17 October 2023
20:00 (19:00 WEST)

Portugal	2–0	Greece
Gomes 26'; Conceição 74' (pen.)	Report

Estádio D. Afonso Henriques, Guimarães
Attendance: 2,231
Referee: Kristoffer Karlsson (Sweden)

16 November 2023
15:00 (16:00 EET)

Greece	3–0	Faroe Islands
Tzolis 5'; Koutsias 51'; Zouglis 57'	Report

Theodoros Kolokotronis Stadium, Tripoli
Attendance: 250
Referee: Mervan Bejtullahu (Kosovo)

20 November 2023
11:00 (14:00 AMT)

Belarus	0–1	Croatia
	Report	Ljubičić 84'

Armavir City Stadium, Armavir (Armenia)
Attendance: 0
Referee: Peter Kralović (Slovakia)
20 November 2023
15:00 (16:00 EET)

Greece	2–1	Portugal
Tzolis 31'; Panagidis 50'	Report	Conceição 29'

Theodoros Kolokotronis Stadium, Tripoli
Attendance: 500
Referee: Nikola Popov (Bulgaria)

21 March 2024
18:30 (17:30 WET)

Portugal	4–0	Faroe Islands
Silva 52'; Forbs 87'; Chermiti 90+4'; Fernandes 90+7'	Report

Estádio de São Luís, Faro
Attendance: 712
Referee: Joonas Jaanovits (Estonia)
21 March 2024
19:00

Andorra	0–3	Croatia
	Report	Izquierdo 2' (o.g.); Ljubičić 8'; Bukvić 86'

Estadi Nacional, Andorra la Vella
Attendance: 523
Referee: Oliver Reitala (Finland)
22 March 2024
12:30 (15:30 AMT)

Belarus	1–0	Greece
Martynov 57' (pen.)	Report

Armavir City Stadium, Armavir (Armenia)
Attendance: 0

26 March 2024
15:00 (16:00 EET)

Greece	1–0	Andorra
Sourlis 41'	Report

Theodoros Kolokotronis Stadium, Tripoli
Attendance: 651
Referee: Luka Bilbija (Bosnia and Herzegovina)
26 March 2024
18:30 (17:30 WET)

Portugal	5–1	Croatia
Santos 3', 11', 22'; Bernardo 25'; Silva 63' (pen.)	Report	Ljubičić 15' (pen.)

Estádio de São Luís, Faro
Attendance: 1,523
Referee: Rohit Saggi (Norway)

5 September 2024
17:00

Croatia	2–1	Faroe Islands
Ljubičić 39' (pen.); Ivanović 89' (pen.)	Report	Nolsøe 90+3'

Sport Centre Rudes, Zagreb
Attendance: 921
Referee: Rob Hennessy (Republic of Ireland)

10 September 2024
18:30 (17:30 WEST)

Faroe Islands	0–4	Greece
	Report	Kourfalidis 13'; Kostis 22'; Koutsias 51'; Niarchos 65'

Við Djúpumýrar, Klaksvík
Attendance: 253
Referee: Jasper Vergoote (Belgium)
10 September 2024
19:00

Croatia	0–2	Portugal
	Report	Bernardo 50'; Forbs 89'

Stadion Branko Čavlović-Čavlek, Karlovac
Attendance: 3,471
Referee: Eric Wattellier (France)

11 October 2024
17:00 (16:00 WEST)

Faroe Islands	1–3	Portugal
Bárðarson 3'	Report	Silva 38'; Brás 67'; Bernardo 89'

Við Djúpumýrar, Klaksvík
Attendance: 300
Referee: Jovan Kachevsk (North Macedonia)
11 October 2024
18:00

Croatia	2–0	Andorra
Beljo 60'; Hodža 86'	Report

Ivan Kušek-Apaš City Stadium, Koprivnica
Attendance: 1,789
Referee: Joonas Jaanovits (Estonia)

15 October 2024
18:00

Andorra	1–2	Portugal
Rosas 90'	Report	Araújo 17'; Silva 85'

Estadi Nacional, Andorra la Vella
Attendance: 876
Referee: Dmytro Kubriak (Ukraine)
15 October 2024
18:00

Croatia	3–2	Greece
Kačavenda 15'; Beljo 34'; Vušković 76'	Report	Kostoulas 45+3'; Bakoulas 45+4'

Ivan Kušek-Apaš City Stadium, Koprivnica
Attendance: 2,479
Referee: Sandi Putros (Denmark)
15 October 2024
18:00 (17:00 WEST)

Faroe Islands	1–0	Belarus
Mneney 36'	Report

Tórsvøllur, Tórshavn
Attendance: 357
Referee: Kamal Umudlu (Azerbaijan)

== Goalscorers ==
There have been 90 goals scored in 30 matches, for an average of 3 goals per match.

8 goals

- (Portugal) Fábio Silva

6 goals

- (Croatia) Marin Ljubičić

4 goals

- (Faroe Islands) Jørgen Nielsen
- (Greece) Christos Tzolis
- (Portugal) Paulo Bernardo

3 goals

- (Croatia) Dion Drena Beljo
- (Croatia) Veldin Hodža
- (Faroe Islands) Gutti Dahl-Olsen
- (Greece) Georgios Koutsias
- (Portugal) Henrique Araújo
- (Portugal) Francisco Conceição
- (Portugal) Rodrigo Gomes
- (Portugal) Pedro Santos

2 goals

- (Andorra) Albert Rosas
- (Belarus) Maksim Kasarab
- (Faroe Islands) Olaf Bárðarson
- (Greece) Vasilios Sourlis
- (Portugal) Mateus Fernandes
- (Portugal) Carlos Forbs

1 goal

- (Andorra) Aron Rodrigo
- (Andorra) Gerard Solà
- (Belarus) Timofey Martynov
- (Belarus) Gleb Rovdo
- (Belarus) Gleb Yakushevich
- (Belarus) Kirill Zinovich
- (Croatia) Martin Baturina
- (Croatia) Domagoj Bukvić
- (Croatia) Franjo Ivanović
- (Croatia) Lukas Kačavenda
- (Croatia) Roko Šimić
- (Croatia) Luka Sučić
- (Croatia) Luka Vušković
- (Faroe Islands) Noah Mneney
- (Faroe Islands) Beinir Nolsøe
- (Greece) Theofanis Bakoulas
- (Greece) Ilias Kostis
- (Greece) Charalampos Kostoulas
- (Greece) Christos Kourfalidis
- (Greece) Giannis Niarchos
- (Greece) Michalis Panagidis
- (Greece) Nikos Zouglis
- (Portugal) Gabriel Costa Brás
- (Portugal) Youssef Chermiti
- (Portugal) João Marques
- (Portugal) Tiago Tomás
- (Portugal) Renato Veiga

1 own goal

- (Andorra) Eric Izquierdo (against Croatia)
