= Józef Piłsudski Stadium =

The Józef Piłsudski Stadium may refer to:

- Józef Piłsudski Stadium (Bydgoszcz)
- Józef Piłsudski Stadium (Kraków)
- Marshal Józef Piłsudski Athletic and Football Stadium
- Polish Army Stadium (Marshall Józef Piłsudski Legia Warsaw Stadium)
