= Russia national under-17 football team =

National association football team

Russia Under-17
- Nickname(s): Юноши (Boys); Юношеская Сборная (Youth Team)
- Association: Russian Football Union
- Confederation: UEFA (Europe)
- Head coach: Dmitri Khomukha
- FIFA code: RUS
First colours	Second colours

First international
- Bulgaria 0–1 Russia (Blagoevgrad, Bulgaria; 28 February 1993)

Biggest win
- Russia 6–0 Moldova (Minsk, Belarus; 22 January 2013); Russia 6–0 Cyprus (Mogilev, Belarus; 30 September 2015)

Biggest defeat
- Russia 1–5 Germany (Shchyolkovo, Russia; 10 October 2001); Russia 0–4 Italy (Tbilisi, Georgia; 15 March 2016)

FIFA U-17 World Cup
- Appearances: 3 (first in 1987)
- Best result: Champions (1987, as Soviet Union)

UEFA European Under-17 Championship
- Appearances: 10 (first in 1984, as Soviet Union)
- Best result: Champions (1985, 2006, 2013)

The Russia national under-17 football team, controlled by the Russian Football Union, represents Russia at the UEFA European Under-17 Championship, FIFA U-17 World Cup and international friendly match fixtures at the under-17 age level.

On 28 February 2022, FIFA and UEFA suspended the participation of Russia, including in the Qatar 2022 World Cup. The Russian Football Union unsuccessfully appealed the FIFA and UEFA bans to the Court of Arbitration for Sport, which upheld the bans. In October 2023, FIFA and UEFA lifted the ban on the team, allowing them to return to competitions. This was met with opposition from Ukraine and some other UEFA members. England, Poland, Latvia, Lithuania, Sweden, Denmark, Finland, Ireland, Norway, and Romania announced that they would not play the team if it was allowed back. UEFA later axed the plan.

== History ==
=== UEFA U-17 Championship Record ===
Year	Round	GP	W	D*	L	GF	GA
(Denmark) 2002	Elite round	-	-	-	-	-	-
(Portugal) 2003	Elite round	-	-	-	-	-	-
(France) 2004	Elite round	-	-	-	-	-	-
(Italy) 2005	Elite round	-	-	-	-	-	-
(Luxembourg) 2006	Champions	5	3	1	1	6	5
(Belgium) 2007	Elite round	-	-	-	-	-	-
(Turkey) 2008	Elite round	-	-	-	-	-	-
(Germany) 2009	Elite round	-	-	-	-	-	-
(Liechtenstein) 2010	Qualifying round	-	-	-	-	-	-
(Serbia) 2011	Elite round	-	-	-	-	-	-
(Slovenia) 2012	Elite round	-	-	-	-	-	-
(Slovakia) 2013	Champions	5	3	2	0	4	1
(Malta) 2014	Elite round	-	-	-	-	-	-
(Bulgaria) 2015	Semi-finals	5	2	1	2	5	4
(Azerbaijan) 2016	Elite round	-	-	-	-	-	-
(Croatia) 2017	Elite round	-	-	-	-	-	-
(England) 2018	Qualifying round	-	-	-	-	-	-
(Republic of Ireland) 2019	Group stage	3	0	0	3	5	8
(Estonia) 2020	Cancelled due to COVID-19 pandemic						
(Cyprus) 2021	Cancelled due to COVID-19 pandemic						
(Israel) 2022	Disqualified						
(Hungary) 2023	Suspended						
(Cyprus) 2024	Suspended						
(Albania) 2025	Suspended						
(Estonia) 2026	Suspended						
(Latvia) 2027	Suspended						
Total	4/24	18	8	4	6	20	18

=== FIFA U-17 World Cup Record ===
Year	Round	Position	GP	W	D*	L	GS	GA
part of Soviet Union
(China) 1985	Did not enter							
(Canada) 1987	Champions	1st	6	4	2	0	21	7
(Scotland) 1989	Did not qualify							
(Italy) 1991	Did not qualify							
as Russia
(Japan) 1993	Did not qualify							
(Ecuador) 1995	Did not qualify							
(Egypt) 1997	Did not qualify							
(New Zealand) 1999	Did not qualify							
(Trinidad and Tobago) 2001	Did not qualify							
(Finland) 2003	Did not qualify							
(Peru) 2005	Did not qualify							
(South Korea) 2007	Did not qualify							
(Nigeria) 2009	Did not qualify							
(Mexico) 2011	Did not qualify							
(United Arab Emirates) 2013	Round of 16	16th	4	1	0	3	5	5
(Chile) 2015	Round of 16	10th	4	2	1	1	6	5
(India) 2017	Did not qualify							
(Brazil) 2019	Did not qualify							
(Peru) 2021	Cancelled							
(Indonesia) 2023	Suspended							
(Qatar) 2025	Suspended							
(Qatar) 2026	Suspended							
(Qatar) 2027	Suspended							
Total	1 Title as part of Soviet Union	3/23	14	7	3	4	32	17

*Draws include knockout matches decided by penalty shoot-out.
**Gold background colour indicates that the tournament was won. Red border colour indicates tournament was held on home soil.

== Honours ==
- FIFA U-17 World Cup
  - Winners: 1987 (as Soviet Union)
  - FIFA Fair Play Award: 1987
- UEFA European Under-17 Championship
  - Winners: 1985 (as Soviet Union), 2006, 2013
  - Golden player: Anton Mitryushkin (2013)

== Current squad ==
The following players were selected for the friendly matches against North Macedonia on 26 and 28 March 2021.

No.	Pos.	Player	Date of birth (age)	Club
	GK	Daniil Khudyakov	9 January 2004 (age 22)	(Russian Football Union) Kazanka Moscow
	GK	Bogdan Moskvichyov	30 April 2004 (age 22)	(Russian Football Union) Zenit Saint Petersburg
	GK	Vadim Tsvetkov	26 March 2004 (age 22)	(Russian Football Union) CSKA Moscow
	DF	Stanislav Bessmertniy	11 March 2004 (age 22)	(Russian Football Union) Dynamo Moscow
	DF	Timofey Danilov	24 February 2004 (age 22)	(Russian Football Union) Spartak Moscow
	DF	Artem Gutsa	12 November 2004 (age 21)	(Russian Football Union) Saturn-Master Egorjevsk
	DF	Ilya Kirsch	21 September 2004 (age 22)	(Russian Football Union) Rostov
	DF	Denis Pershin	21 January 2004 (age 22)	(Russian Football Union) CSKA Moscow
	DF	Vladimir Yarlykov	4 August 2004 (age 22)	(Russian Football Union) Krasnodar
	DF	Leon Zaydenzal	8 July 2004 (age 22)	(Russian Football Union) Dynamo Moscow
	MF	Ruslan Chobanov	30 March 2004 (age 22)	(Russian Football Union) Krasnodar
	MF	Ismail Dibirov	15 July 2004 (age 22)	(Russian Football Union) Saturn-Master Egorjevsk
	MF	Ilya Gribakin	1 February 2004 (age 22)	(Russian Football Union) Chertanovo Moscow
	MF	Dmitry Kuchugura	21 October 2004 (age 22)	(Russian Football Union) Krasnodar
	MF	Artur Maksetsov	19 April 2004 (age 22)	(Russian Football Union) Zenit Saint Petersburg
	MF	Fayziddin Nazhmov	9 April 2004 (age 22)	(Russian Football Union) Spartak Moscow
	MF	Ivan Pyatkin	24 February 2004 (age 22)	(Russian Football Union) Spartak Moscow
	MF	Nikita Saltykov	11 August 2004 (age 22)	(Russian Football Union) Chertanovo Moscow
	MF	Ivan Zazvonkin	10 March 2004 (age 22)	(Russian Football Union) Dynamo Moscow
	MF	Daniil Zorin	22 February 2004 (age 22)	(Football Federation of Belarus) Dinamo Minsk
	FW	Akim Belokhonov	21 January 2004 (age 22)	(Russian Football Union) Zenit Saint Petersburg
	FW	Artem Bykovskiy	15 June 2004 (age 22)	(Russian Football Union) Saturn-Master Egorjevsk
	FW	Kirill Nikishin	5 February 2004 (age 22)	(Russian Football Union) Lokomotiv Moscow
