= Olenev =

Olenev (Russian: Оленев, from олень meaning deer) is a Russian masculine surname, its feminine counterpart is Oleneva. Notable people with the surname include:

- Konstantin Olenev (born 1961), Russian football coach and former player
- Tatiana Mishina (née Oleneva in 1954), Russian figure skating coach and former competitor
