= 2023–24 Olympiacos F.C. season =

Olympiacos
2023–24 season
- Owner: Evangelos Marinakis
- President: Evangelos Marinakis
- Manager: Diego Martínez (20 June 2023 - 4 December 2023); Carlos Carvalhal (5 December 2023 - 8 February 2024); Sotiris Sylaidopoulos (caretaker) (8 February 2024 - 11 February 2024); José Luis Mendilibar (from 11 February 2024)
- Stadium: Karaiskakis Stadium
- Super League Greece: 3rd
- Greek Cup: Round of 16
- Europa League: Group stage
- Europa Conference League: Winners
- Top goalscorer: League: Ayoub El Kaabi (17); All: Ayoub El Kaabi (33)
- Highest home attendance: 33,000
- Lowest home attendance: 14,627
- Biggest win: Maccabi Tel Aviv 1–6 Olympiacos
- Biggest defeat: SC Freiburg 5–0 Olympiacos
Home colours	Away colours	Third colours

The 2023–24 season was the 99th season in existence of Olympiacos and the club's 65th consecutive season in the top flight of Greek football. The season covered the period from 1 July 2023 to 30 June 2024.

In addition to the Greek Super League, Olympiacos participated in this season's Greek Cup, UEFA Europa League and UEFA Conference League. The club won the final of the latter competition, becoming the first Greek side to ever win a major European trophy.

== Players ==
=== First team ===
As of 10 May 2024

Squad No.	Name	Nationality	Position(s)	Place of birth	Date of birth (Age)	Previous club
Goalkeepers
1	Alexandros Paschalakis	(Greece)	GK	Athens, Greece	28 July 1989 (33)	(Greece) PAOK
88	Konstantinos Tzolakis	(Greece)	GK	Chania, Greece	8 November 2002 (21)	(Greece) Olympiacos U19
99	Athanasios Papadoudis	(Greece)	GK	Athens, Greece	6 September 2003 (20)	(Greece) Olympiacos U19
Defenders
3	Francisco Ortega	(Argentina)	LB	Santa Fe, Argentina	19 March 1999 (24)	(Argentina) Velez Sarsfield
14	Rúben Vezo	(Portugal)	CB	Setúbal, Portugal	25 April 1994 (29)	(Spain) Levante
16	David Carmo	(Angola) (Portugal)	CB	Aveiro, Portugal	19 July 1999 (24)	(Portugal) Porto
18	Quini	(Spain)	RB/LB	Fernán Núñez, Spain	24 September 1989 (33)	(Spain) Granada
23	Rodinei	(Brazil)	RB	Tatuí, Brazil	29 January 1992 (31)	(Brazil) Flamengo
27	Omar Richards	(England) (Jamaica)	LB	Lewisham, England	15 February 1998 (25)	(England) Nottingham Forest
36	Nelson Abbey	(England) (Nigeria)	CB	Reading, Berkshire, England	28 August 2003 (20)	(England) Reading
41	Giulian Biancone	(France)	RB/CB	Fréjus, France	31 March 2000 (23)	(England) Nottingham Forest
45	Panagiotis Retsos	(Greece)	CB	Johannesburg, South Africa	9 August 1998 (24)	(Italy) Hellas Verona
65	Apostolos Apostolopoulos	(Greece)	LB	Serres, Greece	11 December 2002 (22)	(Greece) Panserraikos
74	Andreas Ntoi	(Greece) (Albania)	CB/DM	Athens, Greece	2 February 2003 (20)	(Greece) Olympiacos U19
Midfielders
5	André Horta	(Portugal)	CM	Almada, Portugal	7 November 1996 (27)	(Portugal) Braga
6	Chiquinho	(Portugal)	CM/AM	Santo Tirso, Portugal	19 July 1995 (28)	(Portugal) Benfica
7	Kostas Fortounis	(Greece)	AM	Trikala, Greece	16 October 1992 (30)	(Germany) Kaiserslautern
8	Vicente Iborra	(Spain)	DM	Moncada, Spain	16 January 1988 (35)	(Spain) Levante
10	Gelson Martins	(Portugal) (Cape Verde)	RW	Praia, Cape Verde	11 May 1995 (28)	(France) Monaco
15	Sotiris Alexandropoulos	(Greece)	DM/CM	Athens, Greece	26 November 2001 (21)	(Portugal) Sporting CP
17	Jovane Cabral	(Cape Verde) (Portugal)	LW/RW	Assomada, Cape Verde	14 June 1998 (25)	(Portugal) Sporting CP
19	Georgios Masouras	(Greece)	LW/RW	Kechrinia, Greece	24 August 1996 (26)	(Greece) Panionios
20	João Carvalho	(Portugal)	LW/AM	Castanheira de Pera, Portugal	9 March 1997 (26)	(England) Nottingham Forest
32	Santiago Hezze	(Argentina) (Poland)	DM	Buenos Aires, Argentina	22 October 2001 (22)	(Argentina) Huracán
56	Daniel Podence	(Portugal)	LW/RW	Oeiras, Portugal	21 October 1995 (27)	(England) Wolves
77	Ivan Brnić	(Croatia)	LW	Split, Croatia	23 August 2001 (22)	(Slovenia) Maribor
Forwards
9	Ayoub El Kaabi	(Morocco)	FW	Casablanca, Morocco	25 June 1993 (30)	(Qatar) Al Sadd
11	Youssef El-Arabi	(Morocco) (France)	FW	Caen, France	3 February 1987 (36)	(Qatar) Al-Duhail
22	Stevan Jovetic	(Montenegro)	FW	Titograd, Montenegro	2 November 1989 (33)	(Germany) Hertha Berlin
29	Fran Navarro	(Spain)	FW	Valencia, Spain	3 February 1998 (26)	(Portugal) Porto

=== Out of team ===
As of 2 February 2024

Name	Nationality	Position(s)	Date of birth (Age)
Mady Camara	(Guinea)	CM	28 February 1997 (26)

== Backroom staff ==
=== Coaching staff ===
Position	Staff
Sports director	(Serbia) Darko Kovačević (from 5/2/24)
Sports director	(Portugal) Pedro Alves (from 5/12/23 until 5/2/24)
Sports director	(Spain) Antonio Cordon (from 1/6/23 until 5/12/23)
Assistant sports director	(Spain) Jose Ignacio Navarro
Strategic Advisor & Ambassador	(France) Christian Karembeu
Head of football department	(Greece) Avraam Papadopoulos (until 16/10/23)
Head coach	(Spain) José Luis Mendilibar (from 11/2/24)
Head coach	(Greece) Sotiris Sylaidopoulos (caretaker) (from 8/2/24 until 11/2/24)
Head coach	(Portugal) Carlos Carvalhal (from 5/12/23 until 8/2/24)
Head coach	(Spain) Diego Martínez (from 20/6/23 until 5/12/23)
Assistant coaches	(Spain) Antonio Jose Ruiz Perez (from 11/2/24)
Assistant coaches	(Spain) Francisco Manuel Rico Castro (from 11/2/24)
Assistant coaches	(Portugal) João Mário (from 5/12/23 until 8/2/24)
Assistant coaches	(Portugal) Sérgio Ferreira (from 5/12/23 until 8/2/24)
Assistant coaches	(Spain) Raúl Espínola Jiménez (from 20/6/23 until 5/12/23)
Assistant coaches	(Spain) Álvaro García Peinado (from 20/6/23 until 5/12/23)
Analysts	(Greece) Giannis Vogiatzakis
Analysts	(Greece) Iosif Loukas
Video Analyst	(Portugal) Tiago Pires (from 5/12/23 until 8/2/24)
Fitness coaches	(Greece) Christos Mourikis
Fitness coaches	(Portugal) João Meireles (from 5/12/23 until 8/2/24)
Physical trainer	(Spain) Víctor Lafuente Nadales (from 20/6/23 until 5/12/23)
Goalkeepers coach	(Greece) Panagiotis Agriogiannis
Goalkeepers coach	(Portugal) Pedro Miranda (from 5/12/23 until 8/2/24)
Goalkeepers coach	(Spain) Antonio José López Mengual (from 20/6/23 until 5/12/23)
Rehabilitation trainer	(Greece) Kostas Liougkos
Medical team
Doctor	(Greece) Christos Theos (until 23/10/23)
Doctor	(Greece) Andreas Piskopakis (from 23/10/23)
Physios	(Spain) Benassar Sanchez (from 20/6/23 until 5/12/23)
Physios	(Greece) Nikos Lykouresis
Physios	(Greece) Stavros Petrocheilos
Physios	(Greece) Konstantinos Koulidis
Physios	(Greece) Panagiotis Karamouzas
Nutritionist	(Portugal) Hernani Araujo Gomes
Scouts
Scouting Coordinator	(Spain) Jaime Cordon
Scouting and Sports Technology	(Greece) Giannis Theodorou
Scout	(Greece) Simos Havos

== Transfers ==
=== In ===
Νο.	Pos.	Nat.	Name	Age	Moving from	Type	Transfer window	Transfer fee	Notes
4	MF	(Guinea)	Mady Camara	26	(Italy) Roma	End of Loan	Summer	Free	
20	MF	(Portugal)	João Carvalho	26	(Portugal) Estoril	End of Loan	Summer	Free	
8	MF	(Spain)	Vicente Iborra	35	(Spain) Levante	Transfer	Summer	Free	
18	DF	(Spain)	Quini	33	(Spain) Granada	Transfer	Summer	Free	
16	DF	(Argentina)	Nicolás Freire	29	(Mexico) UNAM	Loan	Summer	Free	Option to buy
	MF	(Scotland)	Jordan Holsgrove	24	(Portugal) Paços de Ferreira	Transfer	Summer	Free	
25	DF	(Ecuador)	Jackson Porozo	23	(France) Troyes	Loan	Summer	Free	Option to buy
15	MF	(Greece)	Sotiris Alexandropoulos	21	(Portugal) Sporting CP	Loan	Summer	Free	Option to buy €4M
9	FW	(Morocco)	Ayoub El Kaabi	30	(Qatar) Al Sadd	Transfer	Summer	Free	
10	MF	(Brazil)	Gustavo Scarpa	29	(England) Nottingham Forest	Loan	Summer	Free	
77	MF	(Croatia)	Ivan Brnić	22	(Slovenia) Maribor	Transfer	Summer	€1.3M	
32	MF	(Argentina)	Santiago Hezze	21	(Argentina) Huracán	Transfer	Summer	€4M	
27	DF	(England)	Omar Richards	25	(England) Nottingham Forest	Loan	Summer	Free	
3	DF	(Argentina)	Francisco Ortega	24	(Argentina) Velez Sarsfield	Transfer	Summer	€4.5M	
98	MF	(Norway)	Ola Solbakken	25	(Italy) Roma	Loan	Summer	€1.5M	Option to buy €4.5M
22	FW	(Montenegro)	Stevan Jovetic	33	(Germany) Hertha Berlin	Transfer	Summer	Free	
56	MF	(Portugal)	Daniel Podence	27	(England) Wolves	Loan	Summer	€1.5M	Option to buy €5M
41	DF	(France)	Giulian Biancone	23	(England) Nottingham Forest	Transfer	Summer	Free	
22	DF	(Brazil)	Ramon	22	(Spain) Espanyol	End of Loan	Winter	Free	
29	FW	(Spain)	Fran Navarro	26	(Portugal) Porto	Loan	Winter	€250k	Option to buy €7.5M
10	MF	(Portugal)	Gelson Martins	28	(France) Monaco	Transfer	Winter	€3M	
6	MF	(Portugal)	Chiquinho	28	(Portugal) Benfica	Transfer	Winter	€500k	
5	MF	(Portugal)	André Horta	27	(Portugal) Braga	Loan	Winter	€200k	Option to buy €4.5M
16	DF	(Angola)	David Carmo	24	(Portugal) Porto	Loan	Winter	€250k	Option to buy €18M
36	DF	(England)	Nelson Abbey	20	(England) Reading	Transfer	Winter		
14	DF	(Portugal)	Rúben Vezo	29	(Spain) Levante	Transfer	Winter	Free	
17	MF	(Cape Verde)	Jovane Cabral	25	(Portugal) Sporting CP	Loan	Winter	Free	Option to buy €3M

▼ Total Spending: €17M

=== Out ===
Νο.	Pos.	Nat.	Name	Age	Moving to	Type	Transfer window	Transfer fee	Notes
94	FW	(Democratic Republic of the Congo)	Cédric Bakambu	32	(United Arab Emirates) Al-Nasr	Transfer	Summer	Free	
47	MF	(Spain)	Sergi Canós	25	(England) Brentford	End of Loan	Summer	Free	
38	MF	(Mali)	Diadie Samassékou	27	(Germany) Hoffenheim	End of Loan	Summer	Free	
15	DF	(Greece)	Sokratis Papastathopoulos	35	(Spain) Betis	Transfer	Summer	Free	
6	MF	(France)	Yann M'Vila	33		Transfer	Summer	Free	
27	MF	(Switzerland)	Pajtim Kasami	31	(Italy) Sampdoria	Transfer	Summer	Free	
28	MF	(France)	Mathieu Valbuena	38	(Cyprus) Apollon Limassol	Transfer	Summer	Free	
	DF	(Greece)	Fotis Kitsos	20	(Greece) Volos	Transfer	Summer	Free	
	MF	(Nigeria)	Henry Onyekuru	26	(Turkey) Adana Demirspor	Transfer	Summer	€3.5M	
31	GK	(Iceland)	Ögmundur Kristinsson	34	(Greece) A.E. Kifisia	Transfer	Summer	Free	
	MF	(Guinea)	Mamadou Kané	26	(Cyprus) Pafos	Transfer	Summer	€1M	
	MF	(Scotland)	Jordan Holsgrove	24	(Portugal) Estoril Praia	Loan	Summer	Free	
	MF	(Denmark)	Philip Zinckernagel	28	(Belgium) Club Brugge	Transfer	Summer	€2.5M	
16	MF	(Kosovo)	Zymer Bytyqi	27	(Turkey) Antalyaspor	Transfer	Summer	€500k	
45	DF	(Moldova)	Oleg Reabciuk	25	(Russia) Spartak Moscow	Transfer	Summer	€6M	
	MF	(Guinea)	Aguibou Camara	22	(Greece) Atromitos	Loan	Summer	Free	
	MF	(Argentina)	Maximiliano Lovera	24	(Argentina) Rosario Central	Loan	Summer	€470k	Option to buy €800k
77	MF	(Cape Verde)	Garry Rodrigues	32	(Turkey) Ankaragücü	Transfer	Summer	Free	
	MF	(Portugal)	Pêpê	26	(Cyprus) Pafos	Loan	Summer	Free	Option to buy
	MF	(France)	Abdoulaye Dabo	22	(Turkey) Adanaspor	Transfer	Summer	Free	
	MF	(Greece)	Vasilios Sourlis	20	(Greece) Asteras Tripolis	Transfer	Summer	Free	
22	DF	(Brazil)	Ramon	22	(Spain) Espanyol	Loan	Summer	Free	Option to buy €3.5M
	DF	(Greece)	Alexios Kalogeropoulos	19	(Greece) Volos	Loan	Summer	Free	
24	DF	(Senegal)	Ousseynou Ba	27	(Turkey) Başakşehir	Loan	Summer	Free	Option to buy
5	MF	(Greece)	Andreas Bouchalakis	30	(Germany) Hertha Berlin	Transfer	Summer	€400k	
6	MF	(South Korea)	Hwang In-beom	27	(Serbia) Red Star	Transfer	Summer	€5.5M	
	MF	(Cameroon)	Pierre Kunde	28	(Greece) Atromitos	Loan	Summer	Free	
	MF	(Serbia)	Lazar Ranđelović	26	(Russia) Rubin Kazan	Transfer	Loan	€1M	
	FW	(Egypt)	Ahmed Hassan	29	(Turkey) Pendikspor	Transfer	Summer	Free	
	DF	(Senegal)	Pape Abou Cissé	27	(Turkey) Adana Demirspor	Transfer	Summer	€600k	
	FW	(Mauritania)	Aboubakar Kamara	28	(United Arab Emirates) Al-Jazira	Transfer	Summer	Free	
10	MF	(Brazil)	Gustavo Scarpa	29	(England) Nottingham Forest	End of Loan	Winter	Free	
98	MF	(Norway)	Ola Solbakken	25	(Italy) Roma	End of Loan	Winter	Free	
14	DF	(Greece)	Thanasis Androutsos	26	(Germany) Osnabrück	Transfer	Winter	Free	
16	DF	(Argentina)	Nicolás Freire	29	(Mexico) UNAM	End of Loan	Winter	Free	
17	MF	(Greece)	Marios Vrousai	25	(Portugal) Rio Ave	Loan	Winter	Free	
25	DF	(Ecuador)	Jackson Porozo	23	(France) Troyes	End of Loan	Winter	Free	
21	MF	(Spain)	Pep Biel	26	(Germany) Augsburg	Loan	Winter	Free	Option to buy €5M
22	DF	(Brazil)	Ramon	22	(Brazil) Cuiabá	Loan	Winter	Free	

▲ Total Income: €21.47M

Net Income: ▲€4.47M

== Friendlies ==
Win Draw Loss

8 July 2023	Slovácko	1–2	Olympiacos	Schwaz, Austria
18:00 EEST	Juroška 49'		El Arabi 29', 44'

14 July 2023	Nordsjælland	1–1	Olympiacos	Schwaz, Austria
12:45 EEST	Ingvartsen 42'		El Arabi 55'

19 July 2023	Sabah	1–1	Olympiacos	Kematen, Austria
13:00 EEST	Volkovi 42'		Masouras 64'

26 July 2023	Rangers	1–3	Olympiacos	Glasgow, Scotland
21:45 EEST	Tavernier 52' (pen.)		Fortounis 44'; Carvalho 57', 70'	Stadium: Ibrox Stadium

29 July 2023	Norwich	2–0	Olympiacos	Norwich, England
17:00 EEST	McLean 20'; Sargent 49'			Stadium: Carrow Road

2 August 2023	Asteras Tripolis	0–2	Olympiacos	Piraeus, Greece
19:30EEST			El Arabi; Fortounis

== Competitions ==
=== Overview ===
Competition	Starting round	Final position	Record							
Competition	Starting round	Final position	Pld	W	D	L	GF	GA	GD	Win %
Super League Greece	Matchday 1	3rd	36	23	5	8	78	36	+42	63.89
Greek Football Cup	Round of 16	Round of 16	2	0	2	0	1	1	+0	0.00
UEFA Europa League	Third qualifying round	Group Stage	10	5	2	3	19	16	+3	50.00
UEFA Conference League	Knockout round play-offs	Winner	9	7	0	2	19	10	+9	77.78
Total			57	35	9	13	117	63	+54	61.40

Last updated: 20 May 2024
Source: Competitions

=== Super League Greece ===
==== League table ====
Pos	Team	Pld	W	D	L	GF	GA	GD	Pts	Qualification or relegation
1	PAOK	26	19	3	4	66	21	+45	60	Qualification for the Play-off round
2	AEK Athens	26	17	8	1	60	25	+35	59	Qualification for the Play-off round
3	Olympiacos	26	18	3	5	58	24	+34	57	Qualification for the Play-off round
4	Panathinaikos	26	17	5	4	62	21	+41	56	Qualification for the Play-off round
5	Aris	26	12	6	8	39	29	+10	42	Qualification for the Play-off round

Source: Super League Greece
Rules for classification: 1) Points; 2) Head-to-head points; 3) Head-to-head goal difference; 4) Goal difference; 5) Goals scored; 6) Play-offs (neutral ground).
(Note: Criterion 6 is only used if needed to decide champion, teams for relegation or teams for UEFA competitions).

==== Results summary ====
Overall								Home						Away					
Pld	W	D	L	GF	GA	GD	Pts	W	D	L	GF	GA	GD	W	D	L	GF	GA	GD
26	18	3	5	58	24	+34	57	10	0	3	36	13	+23	8	3	2	22	11	+11

==== Results by matchday ====
Matchday	1	2	3	4	5	6	7	8	9	10	11	12	13	14	15	16	17	18	19	20	21	22	23	24	25	26
Ground	H	H	H	A	Η	H	A	H	A	H	A	H	A	A	A	A	H	A	A	H	A	H	A	H	A	H
Result	W	W	W	D	W	W	W	L	W	L	W	W	D	W	D	L	L	W	W	W	L	W	W	W	W	W
Position	3	1	1	1	1	1	1	2	2	2	2	2	4	4	3	4	4	4	4	4	4	4	4	4	4	3

Source: Super League Greece
A = Away; H = Home; W = Win; D = Draw; L = Loss

==== Regular season matches ====
Win Draw Loss

20 August 2023 1	Olympiacos	2–0	Panserraikos	Piraeus
22:00 EEST	Carvalho (yellow card) 33'; Retsos (yellow card) 48'; Scarpa (yellow card) 59'; Biel 63'; El Arabi 87' (pen.)	Report	Hájek (red card) 4'	Stadium: Karaiskakis Stadium; Attendance: 0 Referee: Ioannis Papadopoulos

27 August 2023 2	Olympiacos	4–0	Atromitos	Piraeus
21:30 EEST	Masouras 32', 49'; Camara 45', (yellow card) 54'; Quini 77'	Report	Tsintotas (yellow card) 49' (yellow-red card) 90+4'; Friðjónsson (yellow card) 52'; Acevedo (yellow card) 53'; Athanasiou (yellow card) 87'	Stadium: Karaiskakis Stadium; Attendance: 18,458; Referee: Konstantinos Perrakis

3 September 2023 3	Olympiacos	4–0	Lamia	Piraeus
20:00 EEST	Masouras 17'; Fortounis 32'; Retsos (yellow card) 35'; Vasilantonopoulos 62' (o.g.); Biel (yellow card) 69'; El Kaabi 90+5'	Report	Tzanetopoulos (yellow card) 16'; Martínez (yellow card) 38'; Slivka (yellow card) 56'	Stadium: Karaiskakis Stadium; Attendance: 21,569; Referee: Vangelis Manouchos

17 September 2023 4	AEK Athens	1–1	Olympiacos	Nea Filadelfeia
21:30 EEST	Ponce 22'; Szymański (yellow card) 25'; Rota (yellow card) 49'	Report	Fortounis (yellow card) 15'; El Kaabi 38'; Biel (yellow card) 62'; Rodinei (yellow card) 79'; Paschalakis (yellow card) 83'	Stadium: Agia Sophia Stadium; Attendance: 29,421; Referee: Artur Soares Dias (Portugal)

24 September 2023 5	Olympiacos	4–0	A.E. Kifisia	Piraeus
17:00 EEST	El Kaabi 21' (pen.); Podence 25'; Alexandropoulos (yellow card) 50'; Jovetic 64' (pen.); Iborra 90+4'	Report	Peios (yellow card) 19'; Masouras (yellow card) 48'	Stadium: Karaiskakis Stadium; Attendance: 20,514; Referee: Konstantinos Katoikos

27 September 2023 6	Olympiacos	4–1	Aris	Piraeus
20:30 EEST	Brabec 21' (o.g.); Quini (yellow card) 44'; Camara (yellow card) 60'; El Kaabi 62', 70'; Jovetic 84'	Report	Pardo 47'	Stadium: Karaiskakis Stadium; Attendance: 20,653; Referee: Mohammed Al-Hakim (Sweden)

1 October 2023 7	PAS Giannina	0–3	Olympiacos	Ioannina
20:30 EEST	Liasos (yellow card) 14'; Tzimas (yellow card) 44'; Bilbao (yellow card) 45+2'	Report	Podence 17', 23'; Alexandropoulos (yellow card) 40'; Porozo (yellow card) 49'; Rodinei 90+1'	Stadium: Zosimades Stadium; Attendance: 2,916; Referee: Vangelis Manouchos

22 October 2023 8	Olympiacos	0–3 (Awarded)	Panathinaikos	Piraeus
19:30 EEST	Ntoi (yellow card) 40'; Fortounis (yellow card) 45'; Camara 48'	Report	Vagiannidis 28'	Stadium: Karaiskakis Stadium; Attendance: 31,914; Referee: Fabio Maresca (ITA)

30 October 2023 9	OFI	0–2	Olympiacos	Heraklion
16:00 EET	Glazer (yellow card) 63'	Report	Podence 10', 54'; Camara (yellow card) 56'; Porozo (yellow card) 69'; Retsos (yellow card) 73'	Stadium: Theodoros Vardinogiannis Stadium; Attendance: 5,100; Referee: Aristotelis Diamantopoulos

5 November 2023 10	Olympiacos	2–4	PAOK	Piraeus
19:30 EET	Hezze (yellow card) 45+2'; Retsos (yellow card) 57'; Camara (yellow card) 76'; Fortounis 86'; Masouras 90+8'	Report	Živković 38'; Brandon 56' (pen.), 65', (yellow card) 57'; Ozdoyev 78'; Kotarski (yellow card) 90+2'	Stadium: Karaiskakis Stadium; Attendance: 28,301; Referee: Daniel Schlager (GER)

12 November 2023 11	Asteras Tripolis	0–2	Olympiacos	Tripoli
20:30 EET	Nikos Papadopoulos (yellow card) 70'; Diamantis Chouchoumis (yellow card) 74'; Vasilios Mantzis (yellow card) 90+2'	Report	Fortounis 69', 90+6'	Stadium: Theodoros Kolokotronis Stadium; Attendance: 5,171; Referee: Ioannis Papadopoulos

25 November 2023 12	Olympiacos	3–1	Panetolikos	Piraeus
17:30 EET	Oikonomou 17' (o.g.); Hezze (yellow card) 33'; Fortounis 40'; Biancone (yellow card) 48'; El Kaabi 70'; Camara (yellow card) 78'	Report	Chatzitheodoridis 13'; Juanpi (yellow card) 59'	Stadium: Karaiskakis Stadium; Attendance: 0 Referee: Konstantinos Perrakis

3 December 2023 13	Volos	2–2	Olympiacos	Volos
16:30 EET	Moraitis 20' (pen.); Mygas (yellow card) 38' (yellow-red card) 45+12'; Kostić (yellow card) 42'; Trouillet (yellow card) 47'; García 51' (pen.); Aslanidis (yellow card) 60'; Comba (yellow card) 76'; Cornette (yellow card) 81'	Report	Retsos (red card) 18'; Masouras (yellow card) 28'; El Kaabi 44' (pen.), (yellow card) 90'; Kalogeropoulos 54' (o.g.); Fortounis (yellow card) 66'	Stadium: Panthessaliko Stadium; Attendance: 5,177; Referee: Anastasios Papapetrou

18 December 2023 14	Panserraikos	0–1	Olympiacos	Serres
18:00 EET	Staikos (yellow card) 55'	Report	Ntoi (yellow card) 12'; El Arabi 65' (pen.); Fortounis (yellow card) 67'; Biancone (yellow card) 77'; Hezze (yellow card) 84'	Stadium: Serres Stadium; Attendance: 0 Referee: Petros Tsagarakis

21 December 2023 15	Atromitos	0–0	Olympiacos	Peristeri
20:30 EET	Athanasiou (yellow card) 71'; Kechrida (yellow card) 86'; Friðjónsson (yellow card) 90+4'	Report	Rodinei (yellow card) 51'	Stadium: Peristeri Stadium; Attendance: 0 Referee: Spyridon Zampalas

3 January 2024 16	Lamia	1–0	Olympiacos	Lamia
17:00 EET	Slivka 4', (yellow card) 90+2'; Kornezos (yellow card) 24'; Amaral (yellow card) 24'; Tošić (yellow card) 84'	Report	Navarro (yellow card) 68'	Stadium: Lamia Stadium; Attendance: 0 Referee: Aristotelis Diamantopoulos

7 January 2024 17	Olympiacos	1–2	AEK Athens	Piraeus
21:00 EET	Masouras 44'; Retsos (yellow card) 55'; Podence (yellow card) 57'; Fortounis (yellow card) 59'	Report	García 32'; Zuber 40', (yellow card) 70'; Gaćinović (yellow card) 78'; Jønsson (yellow card) 89'	Stadium: Karaiskakis Stadium; Attendance: 0 Referee: Boris Marhefka (Slovakia)

14 January 2024 18	A.E. Kifisia	2–3	Olympiacos	Kaisariani
17:00 EET	Santos (yellow card) 45+1' (yellow-red card) 90+3'; Milićević 45+2', (yellow card) 74'; Ožegović (yellow card) 47', (goal) 64' (pen.); Bifouma (yellow card) 50'; Masouras (yellow card) 88'	Report	Masouras 11'; Retsos (yellow card) 35' (yellow-red card) 44'; Navarro 39' (pen.); El Arabi 85'	Stadium: Michalis Kritikopoulos Stadium; Attendance: 0 Referee: Vangelis Manouchos

21 January 2024 19	Aris	1–2	Olympiacos	Thessaloniki
20:30 EET	Fabiano (yellow card) 19'; Rose (yellow card) 37'; Quini 90+1' (o.g.)	Report	Navarro 17'; Rodinei 21' (pen.), (yellow card) 90+3'; Alexandropoulos (yellow card) 78'	Stadium: Kleanthis Vikelidis Stadium; Attendance: 0 Referee: Morten Krogh (Denmark)

28 January 2024 20	Olympiacos	3–1	PAS Giannina	Piraeus
19:30 EET	Ntoi (yellow card) 21', (goal) 57'; Navarro 65'; Jovetic 90+3'	Report	Soria (yellow card) 10'; Rienstra (yellow card) 18'; Rosero (yellow card) 54'; Conde 75' (pen.); Karachalios (yellow card) 79'	Stadium: Karaiskakis Stadium; Attendance: 0 Referee: Konstantinos Perrakis

4 February 2024 21	Panathinaikos	2–0	Olympiacos	Athens
21:00 EET	Bernard 25'; Arão (yellow card) 39'; Jeremejeff 60'	Report	Ortega (yellow card) 6'; Quini (yellow card) 74'; Hezze (yellow card) 77'	Stadium: Leoforos Alexandras Stadium; Attendance: 0 Referee: Sven Jablonski (GER)

10 February 2024 22	Olympiacos	4–0	OFI	Piraeus
17:30 EET	Masouras 6'; El Kaabi 10'; Podence 34'; Fortounis 58'; Carmo (yellow card) 77'	Report	Marinakis (yellow card) 31'; Bakić (yellow card) 83'	Stadium: Karaiskakis Stadium; Attendance: 0 Referee: Konstantinos Tsimenteridis

18 February 2024 23	PAOK	1–4	Olympiacos	Thessaloniki
20:30 EET	Despodov (yellow card) 13', (goal) 39'; Brandon (yellow card) 71'	Report	Biancone (yellow card) 12'; Navarro 29', (yellow card) 68'; Fortounis (yellow card) 41'; Podence 54'; Hezze (yellow card) 57'; Paschalakis (yellow card) 64'; Carmo (yellow card) 80'; El Kaabi 83', 90'	Stadium: Toumba Stadium; Attendance: 25,346; Referee: Christian Dingert (GER)

25 February 2024 24	Olympiacos	2–1	Asteras Tripolis	Piraeus
18:00 EET	El Kaabi 79' (pen.), 87'	Report	Yablonsky 45'; Zouglis (yellow card) 45+3'; Alagbe (yellow card) 81'	Stadium: Karaiskakis Stadium; Attendance: 0 Referee: Vasilis Fotias

28 February 2024 25	Panetolikos	1–2	Olympiacos	Agrinio
17:00 EET	Duarte 33', (yellow card) 52'	Report	Quini (yellow card) 56'; Torrejón 62' (o.g.); Vezo (yellow card) 73'; El Kaabi 79'; Chiquinho (yellow card) 90+3'	Stadium: Panetolikos Stadium; Attendance: 2,074; Referee: Fotis Polychronis

3 March 2024 26	Olympiacos	3–0	Volos	Piraeus
19:30 EET	El Kaabi 27', 45+6' (pen.); Retsos (yellow card) 59'; Jovetic (yellow card) 77', (goal) 87'; Alexandropoulos (yellow card) 90+5'	Report	Assehnoun (yellow card) 2'; Barrientos (red card) 6'; Comba (yellow card) 49'	Stadium: Karaiskakis Stadium; Attendance: 22,599; Referee: Petros Tsagarakis

==== Play-off round ====
Pos	Team	Pld	W	D	L	GF	GA	GD	Pts	Qualification
1	PAOK (C)	36	25	5	6	87	34	+53	80	Qualification for the Champions League second qualifying round
2	AEK Athens	36	23	9	4	80	35	+45	78	Qualification for the Conference League second qualifying round
3	Olympiacos	36	23	5	8	78	36	+42	74	Qualification for the Europa League league phase (Note: Olympiacos qualified for the Europa League league phase as 2023–24 UEFA Europa Conference League winners.)
4	Panathinaikos	36	22	6	8	82	37	+45	72	Qualification for the Europa League second qualifying round (Note: Panathinaikos qualified for the Europa League second qualifying round as 2023–24 Greek Cup winners.)
5	Aris	36	16	7	13	51	44	+7	55	
6	Lamia	36	9	8	19	43	79	−36	35	

Source: Super League Greece
Rules for classification: 1) Points; 2) Head-to-head points (Regular season and play-off); 3) Head-to-head goal difference (Regular season and play-off); 4) Regular season position.
(C) Champions

==== Results summary ====
Overall								Home						Away					
Pld	W	D	L	GF	GA	GD	Pts	W	D	L	GF	GA	GD	W	D	L	GF	GA	GD
10	5	2	3	20	12	+8	17	4	0	1	12	5	+7	1	2	2	8	7	+1

==== Results by matchday ====
Matchday	1	2	3	4	5	6	7	8	9	10
Ground	H	A	H	A	A	H	H	A	H	A
Result	L	L	W	W	L	W	D	W	W	D
Position	4	4	4	4	4	4	4	4	3	3

A = Away; H = Home; W = Win; D = Draw; L = Loss

==== Play-off matches ====
Win Draw Loss

10 March 2024 1	Olympiacos	1–3	Panathinaikos	Piraeus
20:30 EET	Navarro (yellow card) 20'; Podence 24', (yellow card) 26'; Chiquinho (yellow card) 67'; Carmo (yellow card) 75'; El Arabi (yellow card) 80'	Report	Bakasetas 41'; Ioannidis 45+4', 70'; Mladenović (yellow card) 55'; Akaydin (yellow card) 60'; Pérez (yellow card) 90'	Stadium: Karaiskakis Stadium; Attendance: 31,500; Referee: Daniel Schlager (GER)

31 March 2024 2	AEK	1–0	Olympiacos	Nea Filadelfeia
20:30 EEST	Rota (yellow card) 52'; Szymański (yellow card) 59'; Eliasson 90+1', (yellow card) 90+2'	Report	Podence (yellow card) 38'; Chiquinho (yellow card) 41'; Retsos (yellow card) 57'; Fortounis (yellow card) 74'; Rodinei (yellow card) 80'	Stadium: Agia Sophia Stadium; Attendance: 31,100; Referee: Matej Jug (Slovenia)

3 April 2024 3	Olympiacos	3–0	Aris	Piraeus
19:00 EEST	El Kaabi 6'; Hezze (yellow card) 57'; Podence 60', (yellow card) 71'; Carvalho 89'	Report	Brabec (yellow card) 39'; Jules (yellow card) 44'	Stadium: Karaiskakis Stadium; Attendance: 17,526; Referee: Eric Wattellier (France)

7 April 2024 4	Lamia	1–5	Olympiacos	Lamia
17:00 EEST	Simón (yellow card) 60'; Lake 88'	Report	Jovetic 22'; El Kaabi 26' (pen.); Retsos (yellow card) 38'; Papadopoulos 45+1' (o.g.); Kornezos 81' (o.g.); El Arabi 85'	Stadium: Lamia Stadium; Referee: Alexandros Tsakalidis

21 April 2024 6	Olympiacos	2–1	PAOK	Piraeus
20:30 EEST	Quini 27'; Abbey (yellow card) 35'; Martins 61'	Report	Koulierakis (yellow card) 25'; Ozdoyev (yellow card) 63'; A.Živković (yellow card) 63'; Z.Živković (yellow card) 64'; Baba (yellow card) 90'; Marcos Antônio 90+2'	Stadium: Karaiskakis Stadium; Attendance: 29,014; Referee: Miguel Nogueira (Portugal)

24 April 2024 7	Aris	1–1	Olympiacos	Thessaloniki
19:30 EEST	Loren Morón 48'; Zamora (yellow card) 82'	Report	Martins (yellow card) 11', (goal) 53'	Stadium: Kleanthis Vikelidis Stadium; Attendance: 3,533; Referee: Rade Obrenovic (Slovenia)

28 April 2024 8	Olympiacos	4–1	Lamia	Piraeus
17:00 EEST	Chiquinho 24'; Navarro 27'; Podence 52'; Abbey (yellow card) 63'; Alexandropoulos 90+3'	Report	Tošić 64'; Tereziou (yellow card) 90+2'	Stadium: Karaiskakis Stadium; Attendance: 14,627; Referee: Aristotelis Diamantopoulos

12 May 2024 5	PAOK	2–0	Olympiacos	Thessaloniki
20:00 EEST	Taison 26'; Schwab (yellow card) 49'; Brandon (yellow card) 57'; Živković 65'; Despodov (yellow card) 90+2'	Report	Podence (yellow card) 49'; Carmo (yellow card) 54'; Quini (yellow card) 62'; Retsos (yellow card) 89'	Stadium: Toumba Stadium; Attendance: 22,102; Referee: Willy Delajod (France)

15 May 2024 9	Olympiacos	2–0	AEK	Piraeus
20:00 EEST	Horta 65', 90+2'; Quini (yellow card) 74'; Chiquinho (yellow card) 84'	Report		Stadium: Karaiskakis Stadium; Attendance: 30,020; Referee: Tobias Stieler (Germany)

19 May 2024 10	Panathinaikos	2–2	Olympiacos	Athens
20:00 EEST	Mancini (yellow card) 42'; Bakasetas 45+5' (pen.); Bernard 59'; Šporar (yellow card) 90+3'; Jedvaj (yellow card) 90+5'	Report	Podence 73', (yellow card) 67' (yellow-red card) 89'; Jovetic 81'; Martins (yellow card) 90+3'; Tzolakis (yellow card) 90+7'; Quini (yellow card) 90+10'	Stadium: Leoforos Alexandras Stadium; Attendance: 8,501; Referee: Luis Godinho (Portugal)

=== Greek Football Cup ===
Win Draw Loss

==== Round of 16 ====
10 January 2024	Panathinaikos	1–1	Olympiacos	Athens
21:30 EET	Ioannidis 65', (yellow card) 72'; Verbič (yellow card) 90+2'		Alexandropoulos (yellow card) 10', (goal) 45'; Retsos (yellow card) 86'; Camara (yellow card) 88'	Stadium: Leoforos Alexandras Stadium; Attendance: 0 Referee: Julian Weinberger (Austria)

17 January 2024	Olympiacos	0–0 (a.e.t.) (1–1 agg.) (6–7 p)	Panathinaikos	Piraeus
21:00 EET	Camara (yellow card) 27'; Podence (yellow card) 70'; Hezze (yellow card) 97'		Bernard (yellow card) 3'; Mancini (yellow card) 104'; Pérez (yellow card) 109'	Stadium: Karaiskakis Stadium; Attendance: 0 Referee: Dennis Higler (Netherlands)
	Penalties
	Rodinei (penalty scored); Martins (penalty scored); Jovetic (penalty scored); Podence (penalty scored); Carvalho (penalty missed); Vrousai (penalty scored); Ortega (penalty scored); Camara (penalty missed)		Aitor (penalty scored); Pérez (penalty scored); Arão (penalty scored); Jedvaj (penalty scored); Mladenović (penalty missed); Kotsiras (penalty scored); Vagiannidis (penalty scored); Schenkeveld (penalty scored)

=== UEFA Europa League ===
Win Draw Loss

==== Third qualifying round ====
10 August 2023 First leg	Olympiacos (Greece)	1–0	(Belgium) Genk	Piraeus, Greece
22:00 EEST	Fortounis 1'; Iborra (yellow card) 3'; Quini (yellow card) 38'; Alexandropoulos (yellow card) 90+10'	Report	Galarza (yellow card) 3'; Bonsu Baah (yellow card) 90+10'	Stadium: Karaiskakis Stadium; Attendance: 24,123; Referee: Glenn Nyberg (Sweden)

17 August 2023 Second leg	Genk (Belgium)	1–1 (1–2 agg.)	(Greece) Olympiacos	Genk, Belgium
21:00 EEST	Paintsil 30' (pen.), (red card) 65'; Fadera (yellow card) 56'	Report	Masouras (yellow card) 45'; Rodinei (yellow card) 54' (yellow-red card) 90+10'; Camara (yellow card) 56'; Quini (yellow card) 65'; Fortounis (yellow card) 78'; Biel (yellow card) 83'; Freire (yellow card) 90'; Alexandropoulos 90+6'	Stadium: Cegeka Arena; Attendance: 11,998; Referee: Tobias Stieler (Germany)

==== Play-off round ====
24 August 2023 First leg	Olympiacos (Greece)	3–1	(Serbia) Čukarički	Piraeus, Greece
22:00 EEST	El Kaabi 3', 40'; Fortounis 16'; Retsos (yellow card) 66'; Quini (yellow card) 85'	Report	Niksevic (yellow card) 61'; Miladinovic 90+3'	Stadium: Karaiskakis Stadium; Attendance: 24,332; Referee: Donatas Rumšas (Lithuania)

31 August 2023 Second leg	Čukarički (Serbia)	0–3 (1–6 agg.)	(Greece) Olympiacos	Leskovac, Serbia
21:00 EEST	Drezgic (yellow card) 3'	Report	Masouras 34'; Biel 45+1'; Retsos 53'	Stadium: Dubočica Stadium; Attendance: 6,812; Referee: Danny Makkelie (Netherlands)

==== Group stage ====
Pos	Team	Pld	W	D	L	GF	GA	GD	Pts	Qualification	WHU	FRE	OLY	TSC
1	(England) West Ham United	6	5	0	1	10	4	+6	15	Advance to round of 16	—	2–0	1–0	3–1
2	(Germany) SC Freiburg	6	4	0	2	17	7	+10	12	Advance to knockout round play-offs	1–2	—	5–0	5–0
3	(Greece) Olympiacos	6	2	1	3	11	14	−3	7	Transfer to Europa Conference League	2–1	2–3	—	5–2
4	(Serbia) TSC	6	0	1	5	6	19	−13	1		0–1	1–3	2–2	—

Source: UEFA
Rules for classification: Group stage tiebreakers

21 September 2023 1	Olympiacos (Greece)	2–3	(Germany) SC Freiburg	Piraeus, Greece
22:00 EEST	El Kaabi (yellow card) 35', (goal) 40', 74'; Podence (yellow card) 85'	Report	Sallai 9'; Höler (yellow card) 25'; Grifo 45+7' (pen.); Schmidt (yellow card) 52'; Sallai (yellow card) 68'; Philipp 86'	Stadium: Karaiskakis Stadium; Attendance: 30,056; Referee: Allard Lindhout (Netherlands)

5 October 2023 2	TSC (Serbia)	2–2	(Greece) Olympiacos	Bačka Topola, Serbia
19:45 EEST	Đakovac 63'; Pantović 90', (yellow card) 90+3'	Report	Masouras 16'; Podence 57'; Ntoi (red card) 71'; Paschalakis (yellow card) 85'	Stadium: TSC Arena; Attendance: 3,778; Referee: Benoît Bastien (FRA)

26 October 2023 3	Olympiacos (Greece)	2–1	(England) West Ham United	Piraeus, Greece
19:45 EEST	Fortounis 33'; Rodinei 45+1'; Retsos (yellow card) 47'; Alexandropoulos (yellow card) 65'; Camara (yellow card) 82'; Masouras (yellow card) 90+3'	Report	Paquetá (yellow card) 64', (goal) 87'; Emerson (yellow card) 66'; Antonio (yellow card) 76'; Ogbonna (yellow card) 88'	Stadium: Karaiskakis Stadium; Attendance: 30,623; Referee: Andris Treimanis (Latvia)

9 November 2023 4	West Ham United (England)	1–0	(Greece) Olympiacos	London, England
22:00 EET	Álvarez (yellow card) 19'; Kudus (yellow card) 28'; Paquetá 73'; Bowen (yellow card) 90+4'	Report	Podence (yellow card) 38'; Porozo (yellow card) 83'; Fortounis (yellow card) 90+2'; Camara (yellow card) 90+4'	Stadium: London Stadium; Attendance: 55,811; Referee: Matej Jug (Slovenia)

30 November 2023 5	SC Freiburg (Germany)	5–0	(Greece) Olympiacos	Freiburg, Germany
19:45 EET	Gregoritsch 3', 8', 36'; Sildillia 42'; Dōan 77'	Report	Hezze (yellow card) 35'; Retsos (yellow card) 57'; Iborra (yellow card) 83'	Stadium: Europa-Park Stadion; Attendance: 34,000; Referee: Irfan Peljto (Bosnia and Herzegovina)

14 December 2023 6	Olympiacos (Greece)	5–2	(Serbia) TSC	Piraeus, Greece
22:00 EET	El Kaabi 21'; Podence 40', 42'; Ilić 46' (o.g.); El-Arabi 68'	Report	Kuveljić (yellow card) 30' (yellow-red card) 60'; Đakovac 48'; Ćirković 61'; Sós (yellow card) 76'; Krstić (yellow card) 81'	Stadium: Karaiskakis Stadium; Attendance: 20; Referee: Morten Krogh (Denmark)

=== UEFA Europa Conference League ===
Win Draw Loss

==== Knockout phase ====
===== Knockout round play-offs =====
15 February 2024 First leg	Olympiacos (Greece)	1–0	(Hungary) Ferencváros	Piraeus, Greece
19:45 EET	Alexandropoulos (yellow card) 51'; Carmo (yellow card) 61'; El Kaabi 83'	Report	Makreckis (yellow card) 37'; Wingo (yellow card) 77'; Ben Romdhane (yellow card) 90+3'	Stadium: Karaiskakis Stadium; Attendance: 30,300; Referee: Glenn Nyberg (Sweden)

22 February 2024 Second leg	Ferencváros (Hungary)	0–1 (0–2 agg.)	(Greece) Olympiacos	Budapest, Hungary
22:00 EET	B. Varga (yellow card) 42'; Abu Fani (yellow card) 87'	Report	El Kaabi 45' (pen.)	Stadium: Ferencváros Stadion; Attendance: 21,057; Referee: Clément Turpin (France)

===== Round of 16 =====
7 March 2024 First leg	Olympiacos (Greece)	1–4	(Israel) Maccabi Tel Aviv	Piraeus, Greece
19:45 EET	El Kaabi 13'; Iborra (yellow card) 90+3'	Report	Zahavi 4', 30'; Shahar 9', (yellow card) 38'; Kanichowsky (yellow card) 20'; Mishpati (yellow card) 57'; Peretz 74'; Revivo (yellow card) 84'	Stadium: Karaiskakis Stadium; Attendance: 31,054; Referee: Craig Pawson (England)

14 March 2024 Second leg	Maccabi Tel Aviv (Israel)	1–6 (a.e.t.) (5–7 agg.)	(Greece) Olympiacos	Bačka Topola, Serbia (Note: Due to the Gaza war, Maccabi Tel Aviv played their home match at a neutral venue.)
22:00 EET	Zahavi 57' (pen.); Davida (yellow card) 70'; Davidzada (yellow card) 97'	Report	Podence 10', (yellow card) 97'; Fortounis 36', (yellow card) 82'; El Kaabi 45+3', 65'; Jovetić 93'; El-Arabi 103'	Stadium: TSC Arena; Attendance: 370; Referee: Maurizio Mariani (Italy)

===== Quarter-finals =====
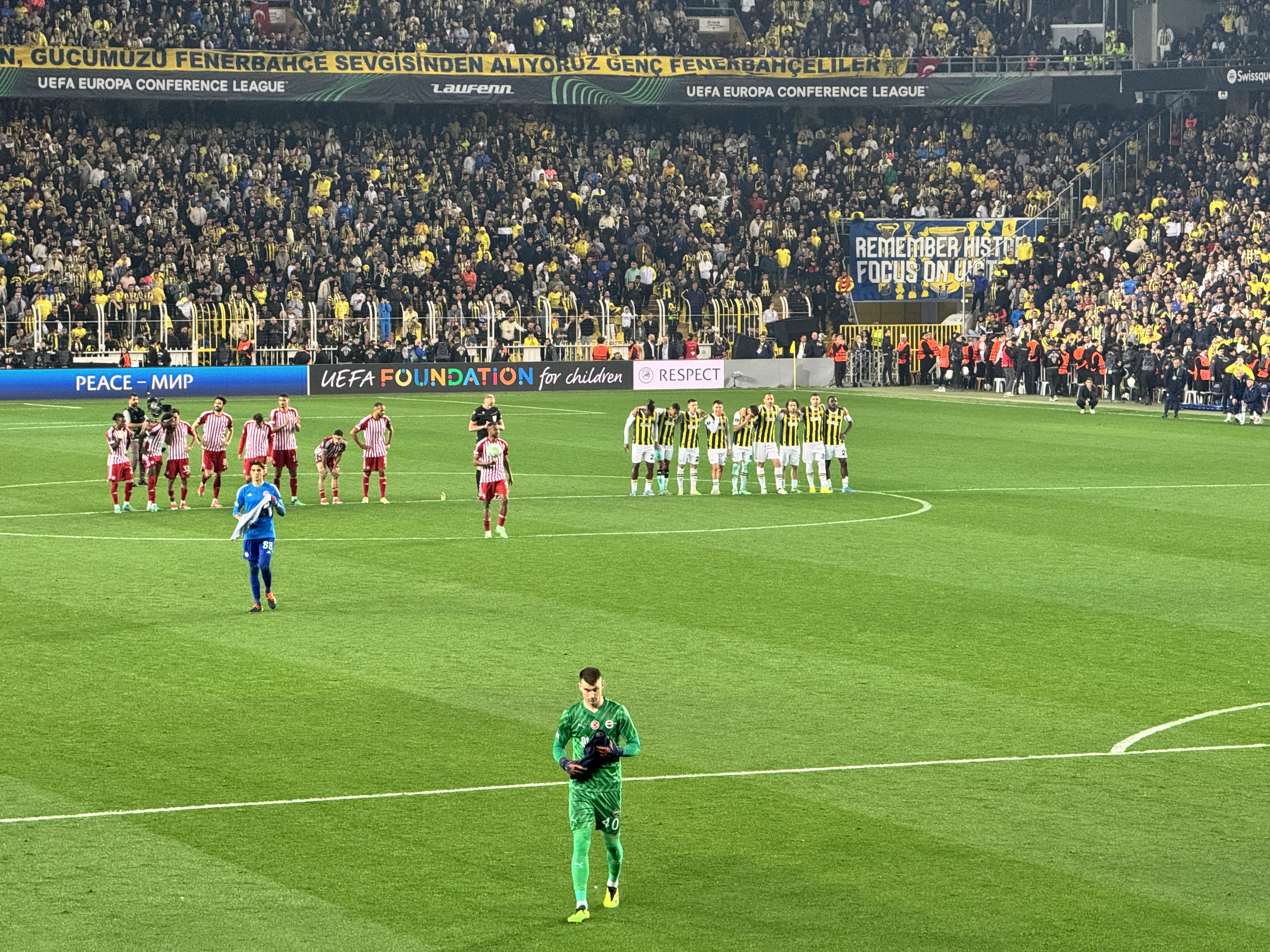
Before the Fenerbahçe - Olympiacos FC penalty shootouts

11 April 2024 First leg	Olympiacos (Greece)	3–2	(Turkey) Fenerbahçe	Piraeus, Greece
19:45 EEST	Fortounis 8'; Jovetić 32'; Chiquinho 57'; Retsos (yellow card) 67'; Masouras (yellow card) 78'	Report	Kahveci (yellow card) 22', (goal) 74'; Tadić 68' (pen.); Fred (yellow card) 73'	Stadium: Karaiskakis Stadium; Attendance: 32,000; Referee: Sandro Schärer (Switzerland)

18 April 2024 Second leg	Fenerbahçe (Turkey)	1–0 (a.e.t.) (3–3 agg.) (2–3 p)	(Greece) Olympiacos	Istanbul, Turkey
22:00 EEST	Kahveci 11'; Szymański (yellow card) 94'	Report	Ortega (yellow card) 36'; Podence (yellow card) 60'; Tzolakis (yellow card) 60'; Ntoi (yellow card) 72' (yellow-red card) 120+4'; Masouras (yellow card) 90+4'; Hezze (yellow card) 112'	Stadium: Şükrü Saracoğlu Stadium; Attendance: 44,040; Referee: Tobias Stieler (Germany)
	Penalties
	Tadić (penalty missed); Batshuayi (penalty scored); Ünder (penalty missed); Djiku (penalty scored); Bonucci (penalty missed)		(penalty scored) El Kaabi; (penalty missed) El-Arabi; (penalty scored) Horta; (penalty scored) Masouras; (penalty missed) Rodinei

===== Semi-finals =====
2 May 2024 First leg	Aston Villa (England)	2–4	(Greece) Olympiacos	Birmingham, England
22:00 EEST	Watkins 45+1'; Diaby 52', (yellow card) 83'; Douglas Luiz (penalty missed) 84'	Report	El Kaabi 16', 29', 56' (pen.); Hezze 67'; Fortounis (yellow card) 83'	Stadium: Villa Park; Attendance: 41,220; Referee: Marco Guida (Italy)

9 May 2024 Second leg	Olympiacos (Greece)	2–0 (6–2 agg.)	(England) Aston Villa	Piraeus, Greece
22:00 EEST	El Kaabi 10', 78'; Rodinei (yellow card) 30'; Podence (yellow card) 53'; Quini (yellow card) 67'	Report	Douglas Luiz (yellow card) 45+5'; Iroegbunam (yellow card) 73'; Durán (yellow card) 89'	Stadium: Karaiskakis Stadium; Attendance: 33,848; Referee: Felix Zwayer (Germany)

=== Final ===
29 May 2024 Final	Olympiacos (Greece)	1–0 (a.e.t.)	(Italy) Fiorentina	Athens, Greece
22:00 EEST	Podence (yellow card) 28'; Jovetić (yellow card) 94'; Alexandros Paschalakis (yellow card) 95'; El Kaabi 116', (yellow card) 117'	Report	Quarta (yellow card) 42'; Kouamé (yellow card) 79'; Biraghi (yellow card) 99'	Stadium: Agia Sophia Stadium; Attendance: 26,842; Referee: Artur Soares Dias (Portugal)

== Squad statistics ==
=== Appearances ===
As of 30 May 2024

No.	Pos.	Nat.	Name	Super League Greece	Greek Cup	UEFA Europa League	UEFA Europa Conference League	Total
No.	Pos.	Nat.	Name	Apps	Apps	Apps	Apps	Apps
23	DF	(Brazil)	Rodinei	29(1)	2	9	9	49(1)
32	MF	(Argentina)	Santiago Hezze	28(3)	2	7(1)	9	46(4)
45	DF	(Greece)	Panagiotis Retsos	26(1)	1	10	7	44(1)
7	MF	(Greece)	Kostas Fortounis	22(6)	1(1)	10	9	42(7)
1	GK	(Greece)	Alexandros Paschalakis	26	2	10	3	41
9	FW	(Morocco)	Ayoub El Kaabi	22(9)	0	8(2)	9	39(11)
19	MF	(Greece)	Georgios Masouras	25(7)	2	7(3)	2(6)	36(16)
3	DF	(Argentina)	Francisco Ortega	20(3)	2	5	8	35(3)
56	MF	(Portugal)	Daniel Podence	22(9)	0(2)	5(1)	7(1)	34(13)
4	MF	(Guinea)	Mady Camara	16(1)	1(1)	10	0	27(2)
74	DF	(Greece)	Andreas Ntoi	16(3)	2	3(2)	2	23(5)
18	DF	(Spain)	Quini	15(6)	0(1)	4(3)	1(3)	20(13)
6	MF	(Portugal)	Chiquinho	12(4)	0	0	8	20(4)
16	DF	(Angola)	David Carmo	11	0	0	9	20
88	GK	(Greece)	Konstantinos Tzolakis	10	0	0	6	16
15	MF	(Greece)	Sotiris Alexandropoulos	8(11)	2	3(6)	1	14(17)
5	MF	(Portugal)	André Horta	11(1)	0	0	3(6)	14(7)
29	FW	(Spain)	Fran Navarro	11(5)	2	0	0	13(5)
8	MF	(Spain)	Vicente Iborra	5(10)	0(1)	3(2)	3(6)	11(19)
41	DF	(France)	Giulian Biancone	9(2)	1	0	0	10(2)
22	FW	(Montenegro)	Stevan Jovetic	6(15)	0(2)	1(3)	2(5)	9(25)
20	MF	(Portugal)	João Carvalho	5(14)	1(1)	2(3)	1(2)	9(20)
21	MF	(Spain)	Pep Biel	6(7)	0	3(4)	0	9(11)
27	DF	(England)	Omar Richards	7(3)	1	0(1)	0(2)	8(6)
16	DF	(Argentina)	Nicolás Freire	3(1)	0	5	0	8(1)
10	MF	(Portugal)	Gelson Martins	6(8)	0(1)	0	0	6(9)
25	DF	(Ecuador)	Jackson Porozo	2(2)	0	2(3)	0	4(5)
98	MF	(Norway)	Ola Solbakken	4(1)	0	0(3)	0	4(4)
10	MF	(Brazil)	Gustavo Scarpa	3(4)	0	0(4)	0	3(8)
36	DF	(England)	Nelson Abbey	3(1)	0	0	0	3(1)
11	FW	(Morocco)	Youssef El-Arabi	1(12)	0	1(5)	0(6)	2(23)
14	DF	(Portugal)	Rúben Vezo	2(3)	0	0	0	2(3)
17	MF	(Greece)	Marios Vrousai	0	0(1)	2(2)	0	2(3)
17	MF	(Cape Verde)	Jovane Cabral	2(2)	0	0	0	2(2)
77	MF	(Croatia)	Ivan Brnić	1(3)	0	0	0	1(3)
65	DF	(Greece)	Apostolos Apostolopoulos	1(1)	0	0	0(1)	1(2)
22	DF	(Brazil)	Ramon	1	0	0	0	1

=== Goalscorers & Assists ===
As of 30 May 2024

No.	Pos.	Nat.	Name	Super League Greece		Greek Cup		Europa League		Conference League		Total		
No.	Pos.	Nat.	Name	G	A	G	A	G	A	G	A	Goals	Assists	G+A
9	FW	(Morocco)	Ayoub El Kaabi	17	2	0	0	5	0	11	1	33	3	36
56	MF	(Portugal)	Daniel Podence	11	8	0	0	3	1	1	4	15	13	28
7	MF	(Greece)	Kostas Fortounis	6	9	0	0	3	7	2	3	11	19	30
19	MF	(Greece)	Georgios Masouras	7	6	0	0	2	0	0	1	9	7	16
22	FW	(Montenegro)	Stevan Jovetic	6	4	0	0	0	0	2	0	8	4	12
11	FW	(Morocco)	Youssef El Arabi	4	1	0	0	1	0	1	0	6	1	7
29	FW	(Spain)	Fran Navarro	5	1	0	0	0	0	0	0	5	1	6
23	DF	(Brazil)	Rodinei	2	3	0	0	1	2	0	1	3	6	9
15	MF	(Greece)	Sotiris Alexandropoulos	1	0	1	0	1	0	0	0	3	0	3
21	MF	(Spain)	Pep Biel	1	3	0	0	1	1	0	0	2	4	6
10	MF	(Portugal)	Gelson Martins	2	3	0	0	0	0	0	0	2	3	5
5	MF	(Portugal)	André Horta	2	2	0	0	0	0	0	0	2	2	4
6	MF	(Portugal)	Chiquinho	1	1	0	0	0	0	1	1	2	2	4
18	DF	(Spain)	Quini	2	0	0	0	0	0	0	1	2	1	3
32	MF	(Argentina)	Santiago Hezze	0	1	0	0	0	1	1	1	1	3	4
45	DF	(Greece)	Panagiotis Retsos	0	0	0	0	1	1	0	1	1	2	3
20	MF	(Portugal)	João Carvalho	1	2	0	0	0	0	0	0	1	2	3
4	MF	(Guinea)	Mady Camara	1	0	0	0	0	1	0	0	1	1	2
74	DF	(Greece)	Andreas Ntoi	1	0	0	0	0	0	0	0	1	0	1
8	MF	(Spain)	Vicente Iborra	1	0	0	0	0	0	0	0	1	0	1
3	DF	(Argentina)	Francisco Ortega	0	3	0	0	0	0	0	1	0	4	4
88	GK	(Greece)	Konstantinos Tzolakis	0	0	0	0	0	0	0	1	0	1	1
27	DF	(England)	Omar Richards	0	1	0	0	0	0	0	0	0	1	1
17	MF	(Greece)	Marios Vrousai	0	0	0	0	0	1	0	0	0	1	1
41	DF	(France)	Giulian Biancone	0	1	0	0	0	0	0	0	0	1	1

Own Goals: 8

== Individual awards ==
Name	Pos.	Award
(Morocco) Ayoub El Kaabi	Forward	IFFHS CAF Best Top Goal Scorer; UEFA Europa Conference League Player of the Season; UEFA Europa Conference League Top scorer; UEFA Europa Conference League Final Man of the Match; UEFA Europa Conference League Team of the Season; UEFA Europa Conference League Goal of the Season; Olympiacos Player of the Season; Super League Greece Player of the Season; Super League Greece Best Foreign Player; Super League Greece Team of the Season; Super League Greece Player of the Month September 2023
(Portugal) Daniel Podence	Winger	UEFA Europa Conference League Team of the Season; Super League Greece Goal of the Season
(Greece) Kostas Fortounis	Attacking midfielder	UEFA Europa Conference League Team of the Season
(Angola) David Carmo	Centre-back	UEFA Europa Conference League Team of the Season
(Brazil) Rodinei	Right back	Super League Greece Team of the Season
(Portugal) Chiquinho	Central Midfielder	Super League Greece Team of the Season
(Argentina) Santiago Hezze	Defensive Midfielder	Super League Greece Player of the Month April 2024
(Greece) Georgios Masouras	Winger	Super League Greece Player of the Month August 2023
(Greece) Charalampos Kostoulas	Forward	Super League Greece 2 Young Player of the Season
