= Ismail Dibirov =

Russian footballer (born 2004)

Personal information
- Full name: Ismail Sheykhmagomedovich Dibirov
- Date of birth: 15 July 2004 (age 22)
- Place of birth: Orekhovo-Zuyevo, Russia
- Height: 1.78 m (5 ft 10 in)
- Position: Midfielder

Team information
- Current team: Dynamo Kirov
- Number: 7

Youth career
- 2015–2022: UOR #5 Yegoryevsk

Senior career*
Years	Team	Apps	(Gls)
2022–2023	Khimki	5	(0)
2024–2025	Veles Moscow	22	(1)
2025–2026	Alania Vladikavkaz	27	(3)
2026–	Dynamo Kirov	13	(0)

International career^{‡}
2021	Russia U17	5	(2)
2021	Russia U18	4	(2)
- * Club domestic league appearances and goals as of 15 November 2026 ‡ National team caps and goals as of 11 October 2021

Ismail Sheykhmagomedovich Dibirov (Russian: Исмаил Шейхмагомедович Дибиров; born 15 July 2004) is a Russian footballer who plays as a midfielder for Dynamo Kirov.

== Club career ==
Dibirov made his debut for Khimki on 22 November 2022 in a Russian Cup game against Pari Nizhny Novgorod.

== Career statistics ==
As of 27 November 2022

Appearances and goals by club, season and competition
Club	Season	League			Cup		Continental		Total	
Club	Season	Division	Apps	Goals	Apps	Goals	Apps	Goals	Apps	Goals
Khimki-M	2022–23	Second League	1	0	–		–		1	0
Khimki	2022–23	RPL	0	0	2	0	–		2	0
Career total			1	0	2	0	0	0	3	0
