= Broń Radom =

Polish football club

- Full name: Radomski Klub Piłkarski; Broń 1926 Radom
- Nickname: Broniarze
- Founded: 21 March 1926; 100 years ago
- Ground: Marshal Józef Piłsudski Athletic and Football Stadium
- Capacity: 4,066
- Chairman: Jerzy Zawodnik
- Manager: Hubert Błaszczak
- League: IV liga Masovia
- 2025–26: III liga, group I, 15th of 18 (relegated)
- Website: www.bronradom.pl
Home colours	Away colours

Broń Radom is a Polish professional football club based in Radom, Masovian Voivodeship. They currently compete in the IV liga Masovia, the fifth tier, following relegation from the III liga in the 2025–26 season.

== History ==
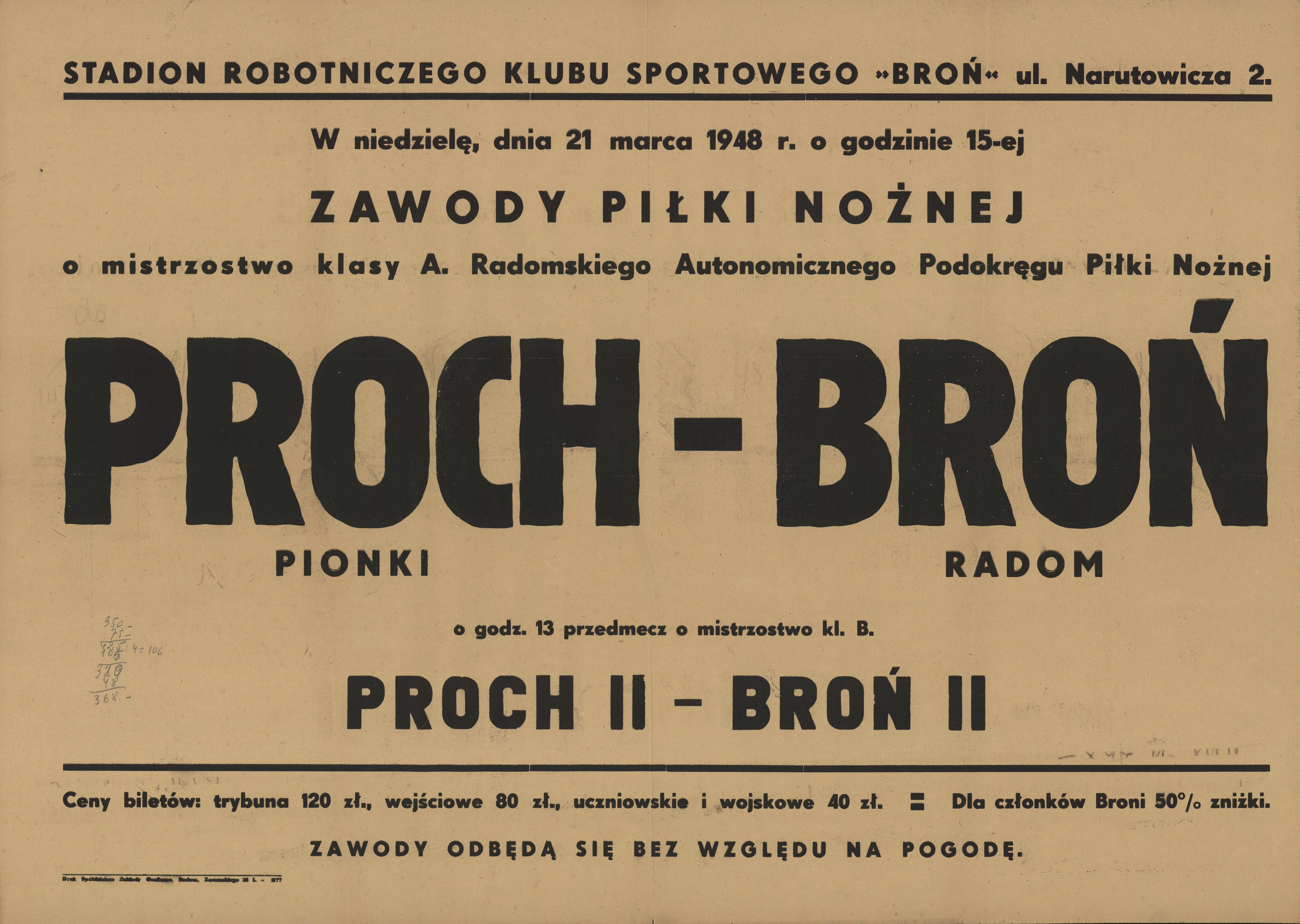
Poster advertising a regional league match between Broń Radom and Proch Pionki, 1948

The history of the organization dates back to 1926, when workers of FB "Łucznik" Radom formed the Club of Cyclists and Motorcyclists Broń (Polish word broń means "weapon" in English, as FB Łucznik, the main sponsor of the club, was a firearms manufacturer). In the course of time, other departments were added, and the organization changed its name to Klub Sportowy Broń. With financial support of the Łucznik plant, Broń emerged as the largest sports organization in the city of Radom. By the early 1930s, Broń had such departments, as archery, tennis, boxing, volleyball, cycling and football. Construction of a new stadium and a swimming pool was initiated, and a cycling track was built.

The organization continued to prosper after World War II. In the 1960 Olympic Games in Rome, Broń's own Kazimierz Paździor won gold medal in lightweight boxing. Broń's cyclist Andrzej Michalak qualified to the 1980 Olympic Games, also its tennis players were recognized nationwide.

In the late 1970s and early 1980s, Broń's football team played in the second tier of Polish football system. Among most famous players who began their careers there were Kazimierz Przybyś, Tomasz Dziubiński (two caps for Poland), and Rafał Siadaczka (17 caps for Poland).

In 1996, several departments became independent, and football team was renamed into Radomski Klub Piłkarski Broń 1926 Radom.

== Current squad ==
As of 5 October 2026

Note: Flags indicate national team as defined under FIFA eligibility rules; some limited exceptions apply. Players may hold more than one non-FIFA nationality.

No.	Pos.	Nation	Player
1	GK	POL	Kacper Górski
2	DF	POL	Jakub Holak
3	MF	POL	Tafara Madembo
4	DF	BRA	Lucas Araújo
5	DF	POL	Cyprian Cieloch
6	MF	BRA	Lucas Giovani
7	MF	POL	Maciej Radaszkiewicz (captain)
8	MF	POL	Marcel Nowocin
9	FW	BLR	Gleb Rovdo
10	MF	POL	Adam Imiela
11	MF	POL	Mikołaj Jagodziński

No.	Pos.	Nation	Player
12	GK	POL	Marian Kuc
14	MF	POL	Adrian Dziubiński
15	DF	UKR	Bohdan Mytsyk
16	FW	POL	Adrian Just
17	MF	POL	Mateusz Krajewski
19	MF	UKR	Yegor Bulgakov
20	MF	POL	Kacper Dąbrowski
21	MF	POL	Jakub Kucharski
22	DF	UKR	Roman Mykytyn
24	GK	POL	Jan Dziadczyk

== Sources ==
- History of Broń Radom (in Polish). Retrieved December 3, 2015
