= Tafara Madembo =

Polish footballer

Personal information
- Full name: Tafara Alexander Madembo
- Date of birth: 26 July 2003 (age 23)
- Place of birth: Warsaw, Poland
- Height: 1.82 m (6 ft 0 in)
- Positions: Left-back; left midfielder

Team information
- Current team: Broń Radom
- Number: 3

Youth career
- 2019–2020: FCB Escola Varsovia
- 2020–2023: Wisła Kraków

Senior career*
Years	Team	Apps	(Gls)
2022–2023	→ Orlęta Radzyń Podlaski (loan)	22	(1)
2023–2025	Kotwica Kołobrzeg	25	(2)
2025–2026	GKS Jastrzębie	7	(0)
2026–	Broń Radom	2	(0)
- * Club domestic league appearances and goals as of 21:48, 2 September 2026 (UTC)

Tafara Alexander Madembo (born 26 July 2003) is a Polish professional footballer who plays as a left-back or left midfielder for IV liga Masovia club Broń Radom.

== Personal life ==
Born in Poland, Madembo is of Zimbabwean descent.
