= Sotiris Alexandropoulos =

Greek footballer

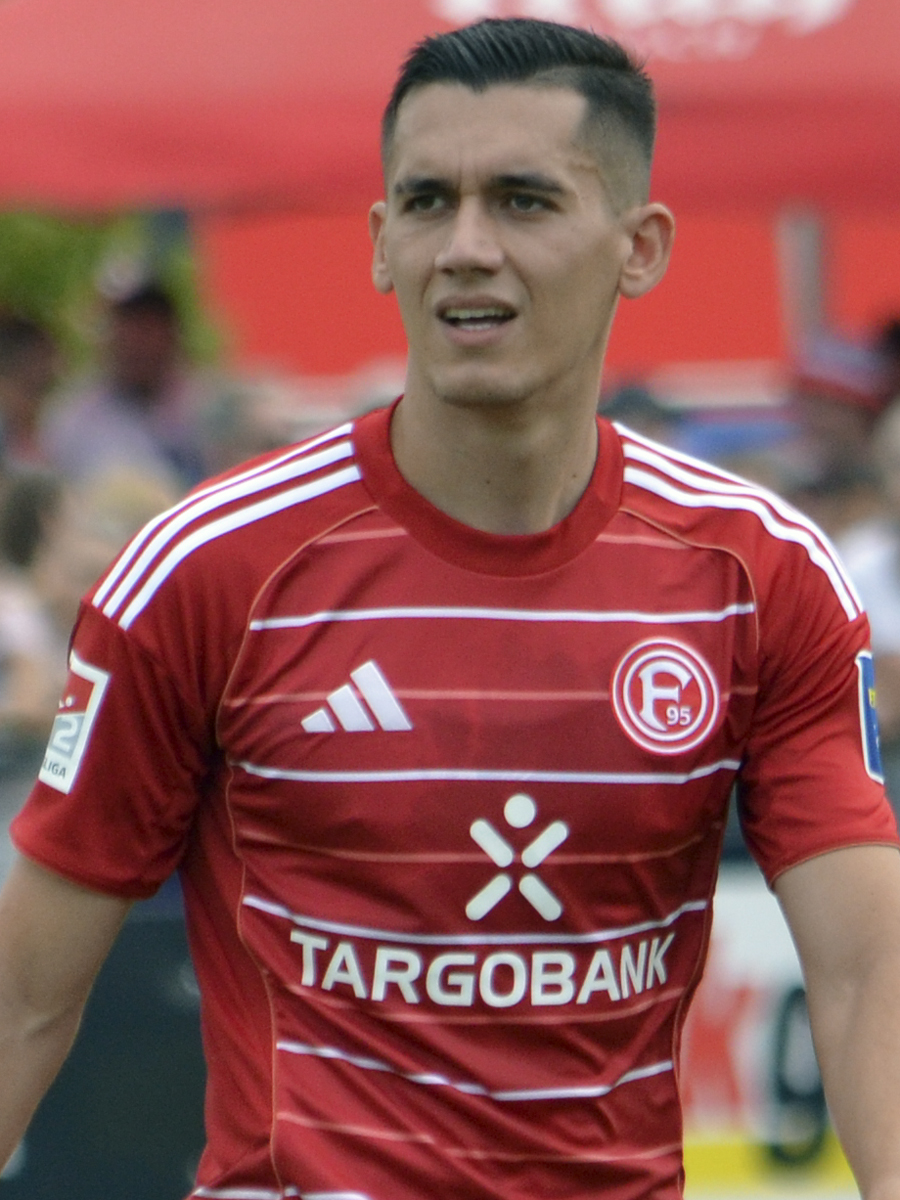

Personal information
- Full name: Sotirios-Polykarpos Alexandropoulos
- Date of birth: 26 November 2001 (age 24)
- Place of birth: Athens, Greece
- Height: 1.86 m (6 ft 1 in)
- Positions: Defensive midfielder; central midfielder

Team information
- Current team: Sporting CP
- Number: 52

Youth career
- 2010–2019: Panathinaikos

Senior career*
Years	Team	Apps	(Gls)
2019–2022	Panathinaikos	68	(1)
2022–	Sporting CP	6	(0)
2023	Sporting CP B	2	(0)
2023–2024	→ Olympiacos (loan)	19	(1)
2024–2025	→ Standard Liège (loan)	35	(0)
2025–2026	→ Fortuna Düsseldorf (loan)	20	(0)

International career^{‡}
2017	Greece U16	4	(1)
2017–2018	Greece U17	16	(0)
2019–2020	Greece U19	4	(0)
2020–2022	Greece U21	3	(0)
2021–	Greece	10	(0)
- * Club domestic league appearances and goals as of 18 May 2026 ‡ National team caps and goals as of 10 June 2025

Sotiris-Polykarpos Alexandropoulos (Greek: Σωτήρης-Πολύκαρπος Αλεξανδρόπουλος; born 26 November 2001) is a Greek professional footballer who plays as a defensive midfielder for Liga Portugal club Sporting CP and the Greece national team.

== Club career ==
=== Panathinaikos ===
Alexandropoulos plays mainly as a midfielder and joined Panathinaikos from the team's youth ranks. Having turned 19, he became a near automatic starter for Panathinaikos in the 2019–20 season.

On 15 June 2021, he signed an extension with the club until the summer of 2024. On 11 September 2021, he scores his first goal for Panathinaikos senior team, against Apollon Smyrnis on a 4–0 win, at the first game of the season

On 21 May 2022, Alexandropoulos won the Greek Football Cup with Panathinaikos against PAOK, his first trophy in his senior career.

=== Sporting CP ===
On 29 August 2022, Alexandropoulos signed a five-year contract with Portuguese club Sporting CP for a fee of €4.5 million, with Panathinaikos also receiving 30% of a future transfer. On 2 September, he made his debut for the club, replacing Manuel Ugarte in the 89th minute in a 2–0 away win against Estoril in the Primeira Liga.

==== Loan to Olympiacos ====
On 3 August 2023, Olympiacos announced the acquisition of Alexandropoulos. The 21-year-old midfielder signed on an initial one-year loan with a purchase option for the following summer, amounting to €4 million.

==== Loan to Standard Liège ====
On 30 July 2024, Standard Liège announced the acquisition of Alexandropoulos. The 22-year-old midfielder signed on an initial one-year loan with a purchase option for the following summer, amounting to €3 million.

==== Loan to Fortuna Düsseldorf ====
On 2 July 2025, Alexandropoulos joined Fortuna Düsseldorf in German 2. Bundesliga on loan with an option to buy.

== International career ==
On 24 March 2021, Alexandropoulos was called up to the Greek senior team by coach John van 't Schip for the forthcoming World Cup 2022 qualifiers against Spain and Georgia. On 28 March 2021, he made his debut with the national team as a substitute in a friendly match against Honduras. Alexandropoulos also represented the country at all youth levels from under-16 onwards.

== Career statistics ==
=== Club ===
As of match played 24 May 2025

Appearances and goals by club, season and competition
Club	Season	League			National cup (Note: Includes Greek Cup, Taça de Portugal)		League cup (Note: Includes Taça da Liga)		Europe		Total	
Club	Season	Division	Apps	Goals	Apps	Goals	Apps	Goals	Apps	Goals	Apps	Goals
Panathinaikos	2019–20	Super League Greece	10	0	1	0	—		—		11	0
Panathinaikos	2020–21	Super League Greece	28	0	1	0	—		—		29	0
Panathinaikos	2021–22	Super League Greece	29	1	6	1	—		—		35	2
Panathinaikos	2022–23	Super League Greece	1	0	0	0	—		1 (Note: Appearance in UEFA Europa Conference League)	0	2	0
Panathinaikos	Total		68	1	8	1	—		1	0	77	2
Sporting CP	2022–23	Primeira Liga	6	0	1	0	3	0	3 (Note: Appearances in UEFA Champions League)	0	13	0
Sporting CP B	2022–23	Liga 3	2	0	—		—		—		2	0
Olympiacos (Ioan)	2023–24	Super League Greece	19	1	2	1	—		10 (Note: Nine appearances in UEFA Europa League, one appearance in UEFA Europa Conference League)	1	31	3
Standard Liège (Ioan)	2024–25	Belgian Pro League	35	0	2	0	0	0	0	0	37	0
Career total			130	2	13	2	3	0	14	1	160	5

=== International ===
As of match played 22 November 2023

Appearances and goals by national team and year
National team	Year	Apps	Goals
Greece	2021	1	0
Greece	2022	6	0
Greece	2023	2	0
Total		9	0

== Honours ==
Panathinaikos

- Greek Cup: 2021–22

Olympiacos

- UEFA Conference League: 2023–24

Individual

- Super League Greece Young Player of the Season: 2021–22
