= Uladzislaw Duksa =

Belarusian footballer

Personal information
- Date of birth: 7 July 1980 (age 46)
- Position: Defender

Team information
- Current team: Smorgon (reserves manager)

Senior career*
Years	Team	Apps	(Gls)
1998–2013	Smorgon	331	(10)

Managerial career
- 2017–2020: Smorgon (youth)
- 2021–: Smorgon (reserves)
- 2021: Smorgon (caretaker)
- * Club domestic league appearances and goals

Uladzislaw Duksa (Belarusian: Уладзіслаў Дукса; Russian: Владислав Дуксо; born 7 July 1980) is a Belarusian professional football coach and former player. He spent his entire 16-year playing career with Smorgon.

His son Matvey Dukso is also a professional footballer playing for Smorgon.
