= Andreas Ntoi =

Greek footballer (born 2003)

Andreas Ntoi Andreas Ndoj
Personal information
- Full name: Andreas Richardos Ntoi
- Date of birth: 2 February 2003 (age 23)
- Place of birth: Athens, Greece
- Height: 1.90 m (6 ft 3 in)
- Positions: Centre-back; defensive midfielder

Team information
- Current team: Rio Ave
- Number: 5

Youth career
- –2021: Olympiacos

Senior career*
Years	Team	Apps	(Gls)
2021–2022	Olympiacos B	26	(0)
2022–2025	Olympiacos	46	(2)
2025	→ Rio Ave (loan)	16	(0)
2025–	Rio Ave	30	(1)

International career^{‡}
2018–2019	Albania U16	6	(0)
2019–2020	Greece U17	6	(0)
2021	Greece U19	3	(0)
2022	Albania U21	1	(0)
2024–	Greece	3	(0)
- * Club domestic league appearances and goals as of 25 May 2026 ‡ National team caps and goals as of 4 June 2026

Andreas Ntoi (Greek: Ανδρέας Ντόι; Albanian: Andreas Ndoj; born 2 February 2003) is a Greek-Albanian professional footballer who plays as a centre-back or defensive midfielder for Primeira Liga club Rio Ave and the Greece national team.

== Club career ==
On 16 January 2025, Ntoi moved from Olympiacos to Rio Ave on loan for the rest of the season 2024–25 season.

== International career ==
Ntoi received his first call up for the Greece national team on 23 May 2024 by interim coach Nikos Papadopoulos. He made his debut on 11 June 2024 in a friendly against Malta in Grödig, Austria. He substituted Panagiotis Retsos in the 73rd minute of Greece's 2–0 victory.

== Career statistics ==
=== Club ===
As of match played 18 April 2026

Appearances and goals by club, season and competition
Club	Season	League			National cup (Note: Includes Greek Cup. Taça de Portugal)		Europe		Total	
Club	Season	Division	Apps	Goals	Apps	Goals	Apps	Goals	Apps	Goals
Olympiacos B	2021–22	Super League Greece 2	26	0	—		—		26	0
Olympiacos	2022–23	Super League Greece	21	1	4	0	2 (Note: Appearances in UEFA Europa League)	0	27	1
Olympiacos	2023–24	Super League Greece	19	1	2	0	7 (Note: Five appearances in UEFA Europa League, two appearances in UEFA Conference League)	0	28	1
Olympiacos	2024–25	Super League Greece	6	0	1	0	2	0	9	0
Olympiacos	Total		46	2	7	0	11	0	64	2
Rio Ave	2024–25 (loan)	Primeira Liga	16	0	3	0	—		19	0
Rio Ave	2025–26	Primeira Liga	27	1	1	0	—		28	1
Rio Ave	Career total		115	3	11	0	11	0	137	3

=== International ===
As of match played 10 September 2024

Appearances and goals by national team and year
National team	Year	Apps	Goals
Greece	2024	2	0
Total		2	0

== Honours ==
Olympiacos

- UEFA Conference League: 2023–24
