= Andrey Savin =

Russian football player

Personal information
- Full name: Andrey Sergeyevich Savin
- Date of birth: 30 August 1999 (age 27)
- Place of birth: Kirov, Russia
- Height: 1.93 m (6 ft 4 in)
- Position: Goalkeeper

Team information
- Current team: FC Dynamo Kirov
- Number: 16

Youth career
- FC Dynamo Kirov

Senior career*
Years	Team	Apps	(Gls)
2015–2017	FC Dynamo Kirov	8	(0)
2017–2020	FC Nosta Novotroitsk	21	(0)
2019–2020	→ FC Kazanka Moscow (loan)	13	(0)
2019–2020	→ FC Lokomotiv Moscow (loan)	0	(0)
2020–2022	FC Kazanka Moscow	16	(0)
2020–2023	FC Lokomotiv Moscow	0	(0)
2023–2024	FC Tyumen	6	(0)
2024–2025	FC Sibir Novosibirsk	24	(0)
2025–2026	FC Irtysh Omsk	19	(0)
2026–	FC Dynamo Kirov	4	(0)

International career^{‡}
2019	Russia U20	1	(0)
- * Club domestic league appearances and goals as of 15 November 2026 ‡ National team caps and goals as of 11 June 2019

Andrey Sergeyevich Savin (Russian: Андрей Сергеевич Савин; born 30 August 1999) is a Russian football player who plays for FC Dynamo Kirov.

== Club career ==
He made his debut for FC Lokomotiv Moscow on 31 August 2022 in a Russian Cup game against FC Pari Nizhny Novgorod. That remained his only game for Lokomotiv's senior squad.

On 7 July 2023, Savin moved to FC Tyumen.

== Career statistics ==
As of 27 November 2022

Club	Season	League			Cup		Continental		Total	
Club	Season	Division	Apps	Goals	Apps	Goals	Apps	Goals	Apps	Goals
Dynamo Kirov	2015–16	Second League	1	0	–		–		1	0
Dynamo Kirov	2016–17	Second League	7	0	1	0	–		8	0
Dynamo Kirov	Total		8	0	1	0	0	0	9	0
Nosta Novotroitsk	2017–18	Second League	12	0	0	0	–		12	0
Nosta Novotroitsk	2018–19	Second League	9	0	0	0	–		9	0
Nosta Novotroitsk	Total		21	0	0	0	0	0	21	0
Kazanka Moscow	2018–19	Second League	7	0	–		–		7	0
Kazanka Moscow	2019–20	Second League	6	0	–		–		6	0
Kazanka Moscow	2020–21	Second League	10	0	–		–		10	0
Kazanka Moscow	2021–22	Second League	6	0	–		–		6	0
Kazanka Moscow	Total		29	0	0	0	0	0	29	0
Lokomotiv Moscow	2019–20	RPL	0	0	0	0	0	0	0	0
Lokomotiv Moscow	2020–21	RPL	0	0	0	0	0	0	0	0
Lokomotiv Moscow	2021–22	RPL	0	0	0	0	0	0	0	0
Lokomotiv Moscow	2022–23	RPL	0	0	1	0	–		1	0
Lokomotiv Moscow	Total		0	0	1	0	0	0	1	0
Career total			58	0	2	0	0	0	60	0
