= Nikita Shelest =

Russian footballer (born 2003)

Personal information
- Full name: Nikita Aleksandrovich Shelest
- Date of birth: 7 October 2003 (age 23)
- Place of birth: Stavropol, Russia
- Height: 1.85 m (6 ft 1 in)
- Position: Midfielder

Youth career
- Kosmos Stavropol
- –2020: SSh-10 Sochi
- 2021: Rostov
- 2021–2022: Sochi

Senior career*
Years	Team	Apps	(Gls)
2023	Rubin Yalta (KFS)		
2023	Rubin Yalta	11	(0)
2024–2025	Zhemchuzhina Sochi (amateur)		
2025	Molodechno	8	(1)
- * Club domestic league appearances and goals as of 19 March 2026

Nikita Aleksandrovich Shelest (Russian: Никита Александрович Шелест; born 7 October 2003) is a Russian footballer who plays as a midfielder.

== Career ==
He made his debut in the Russian Second League for Rubin Yalta on 16 July 2023, in a game against Biolog-Novokubansk.

He made his debut in the Belarusian Premier League for Molodechno on 8 August 2025 in a game against Slavia Mozyr.
