= Matvey Dukso =

Belarusian footballer

Personal information
- Date of birth: 8 April 2003 (age 23)
- Place of birth: Smarhonʹ, Grodno Oblast, Belarus
- Position: Midfielder

Team information
- Current team: Smorgon
- Number: 17

Youth career
- 2018–2019: Dinamo Brest
- 2019–2020: Smorgon

Senior career*
Years	Team	Apps	(Gls)
2020–2023	Smorgon	74	(14)
2024–	Dinamo Brest	7	(0)
2024	→ Smorgon (loan)	9	(1)
2025	→ Molodechno (loan)	9	(1)
2025–	→ Smorgon (loan)	25	(2)
- * Club domestic league appearances and goals as of 6 July 2026

Matvey Dukso (Belarusian: Мацвей Дукса; Russian: Матвей Дуксо; born 8 April 2003) is a Belarusian professional footballer who plays for Smorgon on loan from Dinamo Brest.

His father Vladislav Dukso is a former professional footballer who spent his entire career playing for Smorgon.
