= Vladislav Yatskevich =

Belarusian footballer

Personal information
- Date of birth: 29 September 1998 (age 28)
- Place of birth: Smorgon, Grodno Oblast, Belarus
- Height: 1.87 m (6 ft 2 in)
- Position: Midfielder

Team information
- Current team: Minsk
- Number: 15

Youth career
- 2011–2014: Shakhtyor Soligorsk

Senior career*
Years	Team	Apps	(Gls)
2015–2017	Smorgon	46	(3)
2018	Baranovichi	9	(0)
2018–2019	Smorgon	18	(0)
2019–2022	Neman Grodno	12	(0)
2021	→ Smorgon (loan)	26	(1)
2022	→ Slutsk (loan)	6	(0)
2023	Slutsk	0	(0)
2023	Smorgon	12	(0)
2024–2025	Gomel	45	(3)
2025–	Minsk	24	(2)

International career^{‡}
2019–2020	Belarus U21	3	(0)
- * Club domestic league appearances and goals as of 6 July 2026 ‡ National team caps and goals as of 9 October 2020

Vladislav Yatskevich (Belarusian: Уладзіслаў Яцкевіч; Russian: Владислав Яцкевич; born 29 September 1998) is a Belarusian professional footballer who plays for Minsk.
