= Vladimir Yarlykov =

Russian footballer

Personal information
- Full name: Vladimir Igorevich Yarlykov
- Date of birth: 4 August 2004 (age 22)
- Place of birth: Krasnodar, Russia
- Height: 1.86 m (6 ft 1 in)
- Position: Defender

Youth career
- –2022: Krasnodar

Senior career*
Years	Team	Apps	(Gls)
2023–2025	Krasnodar	0	(0)
2023–2024	→ Krasnodar-2	14	(2)
2025	→ Dynamo Vologda (loan)	0	(0)

International career
2023	Russia U-19	1	(0)
- * Club domestic league appearances and goals as of 7 July 2025

Vladimir Igorevich Yarlykov (Russian: Владимир Игоревич Ярлыков; born 4 August 2004) is a Russian footballer who plays as a defender.

== Club career ==
He made his debut in the Russian First League for Krasnodar-2 on 6 May 2023 in a game against Rubin Kazan.
