= Maksim Kasarab =

Belarusian footballer

Personal information
- Date of birth: 10 June 2003 (age 23)
- Place of birth: Minsk, Belarus
- Height: 1.85 m (6 ft 1 in)
- Position: Defender

Team information
- Current team: Dnepr Mogilev (on loan from Dinamo Brest)
- Number: 15

Youth career
- 2015–2020: Minsk

Senior career*
Years	Team	Apps	(Gls)
2020–2023	Minsk	44	(2)
2024–	Dinamo Brest	38	(2)
2026–	→ Dnepr Mogilev (loan)	12	(0)

International career^{‡}
2019	Belarus U17	2	(0)
2021	Belarus U19	3	(0)
2023–2024	Belarus U21	13	(2)
2024–	Belarus	1	(0)
- * Club domestic league appearances and goals as of 3 July 2026 ‡ National team caps and goals as of 11 June 2024

Maksim Kasarab (Belarusian: Максім Касараб; Russian: Максим Касараб; born 10 June 2003) is a Belarusian professional footballer who plays for Belarusian Premier League club Dnepr Mogilev (on loan from Dinamo Brest) and the Belarus national team.

== International career ==
Kasarab made his debut for the Belarus national team on 11 June 2024 in a friendly against Israel at the Szusza Ferenc Stadion in Budapest, Hungary. He substituted Vladislav Klimovich in the 73rd minute, Israel won 4–0.
