= Konstantin Olenev =

Russian footballer and coach

Personal information
- Full name: Konstantin Valeryevich Olenev
- Date of birth: 11 September 1961 (age 65)
- Place of birth: Yoshkar-Ola, Russian SFSR
- Height: 1.82 m (5 ft 11 1/2 in)
- Position: Goalkeeper

Team information
- Current team: FC Dynamo Kirov (assistant coach)

Senior career*
Years	Team	Apps	(Gls)
1979–1981	FC Druzhba Yoshkar-Ola		
1982–1984	FC Dynamo Kirov	13	(0)
1985–1986	FC Sokol Saratov	18	(0)
1987	FC Start Ulyanovsk		
1988	FC Kuban Krasnodar	9	(0)
1988–1991	FC Start Ulyanovsk	139	(0)
1992–1998	FC Sokol Saratov	170	(0)
1999–2003	FC Volga Ulyanovsk	109	(0)
2004	FC Lukoil Chelyabinsk	0	(0)

Managerial career
- 2005–2008: FC Dynamo Kirov
- 2008–2009: FC Sokol Saratov
- 2011–2016: FC Dynamo Kirov (assistant)
- 2016–2017: FC Dynamo Kirov
- 2023–: FC Dynamo Kirov (assistant)
- * Club domestic league appearances and goals

Konstantin Valeryevich Olenev (Russian: Константин Валерьевич Оленёв; born 11 September 1961) is a Russian professional football coach and a former player. He is an assistant coach with FC Dynamo Kirov.

As a player, he made his debut in 1979 the Soviet Second League in for FC Druzhba Yoshkar-Ola.
