= FC Dynamo Kirov =

Russian football club

- Full name: Футбольный клуб Динамо Киров (Football Club Dynamo Kirov)
- Founded: 1923
- Ground: Dinamo Stadium
- Capacity: 3,000
- Chairman: Yegor Drozhachikh
- Manager: Viktor Bulatov
- League: Russian Second League, Division A, Gold Group
- 2025–26: Second stage: Silver Group, 2nd
- Website: fcdmkirov.ru
Home colours	Away colours

FC Dynamo Kirov (Russian: ФК «Динамо» Киров) is a Russian association football club from Kirov, founded in 1923. It plays in the Russian Second League.

== Club history ==
The club played on the professional level in 1937, 1957 to 1994, 1999 to 2017 and from 2023. The highest level it ever achieved was the second highest (Soviet First League and Russian First Division), where it played in 1957–1962, 1982, 1983, and 1992. It was called Dynamo Vyatka (1923–1934 before the city of Vyatka was renamed to Kirov), Vyatka Kirov (1993–1996), Mashinostroitel Kirov (1997–1998), and Dynamo-Mashinostroitel Kirov (1999–2003). The assistant coach is currently Konstantin Olenev (2023-).

On 18 July 2017, the club voluntarily left the third-tier Russian Professional Football League due to lack of financing.

For the 2023 season, Dynamo was licensed for the Russian Second League once again (for the fourth-tier Division B). At the end of the 2024 season, it was promoted to the third-tier Second League Division A.

== Current squad ==
As of 11 September 2026, according to the Second League website.

Note: Flags indicate national team as defined under FIFA eligibility rules; some limited exceptions apply. Players may hold more than one non-FIFA nationality.

No.	Pos.	Nation	Player
1	GK	RUS	Vladimir Zadiraka
3	MF	RUS	Yefim Kolobov (on loan from Rodina Moscow)
5	DF	RUS	Ivan Goryainov
6	MF	RUS	Matvey Martinkevich
7	MF	RUS	Ismail Dibirov
8	MF	RUS	Nikolay Kamayev
9	FW	RUS	Bilal Bilalov
10	FW	RUS	Maksim Lauk
12	DF	RUS	Andrei Malykh
13	FW	RUS	Mikhail Ageyev
16	GK	RUS	Andrey Savin
17	MF	RUS	Timur Bulatsev
19	DF	RUS	Aleksandr Stepanov
22	FW	RUS	Daniil Maltsev

No.	Pos.	Nation	Player
24	DF	RUS	Timofey Sitnikov
26	MF	RUS	Nikita Semenishchev
27	DF	BLR	Aleksandr Chizh
29	DF	RUS	Yevgeny Ignatovich
42	MF	RUS	Rodion Romanov
47	DF	RUS	Valentin Solodarenko
73	DF	RUS	Stefan Kalinov
75	DF	RUS	Ivan Veselkov
89	MF	RUS	Nikita Dorofeyev
91	MF	RUS	Artyom Filippov
96	GK	RUS	Kirill Belevskikh
98	MF	RUS	Yegor Pozdnyakov
99	MF	RUS	Aleksandr Burkov
