= Kirill Chernook =

Belarusian footballer

Personal information
- Date of birth: 2 January 2003 (age 23)
- Place of birth: Verkhnedvinsk, Vitebsk Oblast, Belarus
- Height: 1.77 m (5 ft 10 in)
- Position: Midfielder

Team information
- Current team: Slavia Mozyr
- Number: 17

Youth career
- 2017–2020: Dinamo Brest

Senior career*
Years	Team	Apps	(Gls)
2021	Rukh Brest	14	(0)
2022–2023	Minsk	38	(4)
2023–2025	BATE Borisov	47	(4)
2025	→ Slavia Mozyr (loan)	11	(1)
2026–	Slavia Mozyr	10	(2)

International career^{‡}
2019	Belarus U17	2	(0)
2022–2023	Belarus U21	3	(0)
- * Club domestic league appearances and goals as of 6 July 2026 ‡ National team caps and goals as of 28 March 2023

Kirill Chernook (Belarusian: Кірыл Чарнавок; Russian: Кирилл Черноок; born 2 January 2003) is a Belarusian professional footballer who plays for Slavia Mozyr.
