= Yan Mosesov =

Belarusian footballer

Personal information
- Date of birth: 31 March 2000 (age 26)
- Place of birth: Vitebsk, Belarus
- Position: Midfielder

Team information
- Current team: Vitebsk
- Number: 8

Youth career
- 2014–2017: RGUOR Minsk
- 2017–2019: Vitebsk

Senior career*
Years	Team	Apps	(Gls)
2019–2025	Vitebsk	56	(0)

International career
2015–2017	Belarus U17		
- * Club domestic league appearances and goals as of 6 April 2026

Yan Mosesov (Belarusian: Ян Масесаў; Russian: Ян Мосесов; born 31 March 2000) is a Belarusian former professional footballer who last played for Vitebsk.
