= Daniil Silinsky =

Belarusian footballer

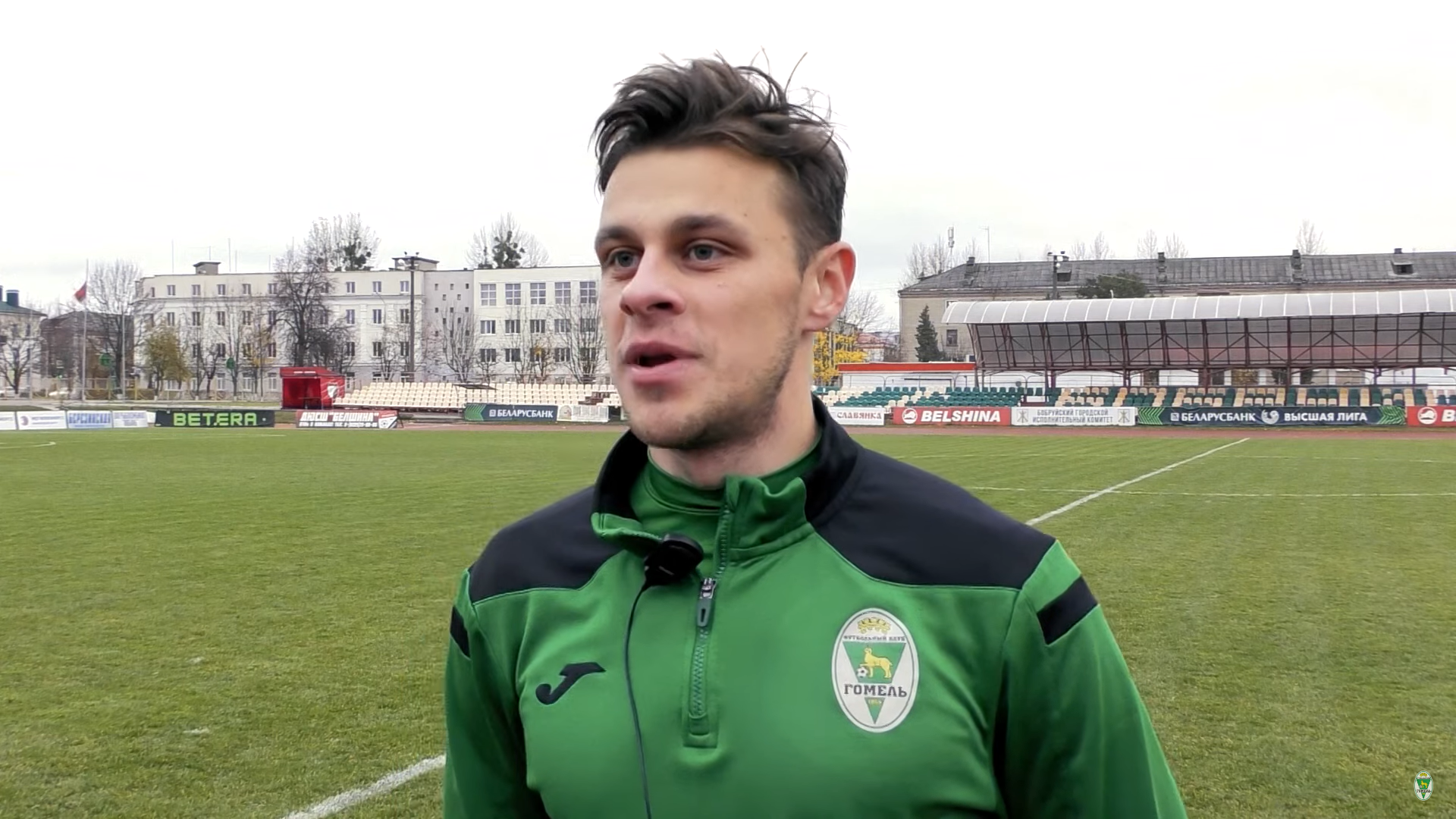
- FC Gomel 2023

Personal information
- Full name: Daniil Andreyevich Silinsky
- Date of birth: 6 January 2000 (age 26)
- Place of birth: Baranovichi, Brest Oblast, Belarus
- Height: 1.81 m (5 ft 11 in)
- Position: Midfielder

Team information
- Current team: Gomel
- Number: 19

Senior career*
Years	Team	Apps	(Gls)
2018–2021	Baranovichi	42	(0)
2020	→ Slonim-2017 (loan)	24	(0)
2021	→ Smorgon (loan)	7	(0)
2022–2023	Energetik-BGU Minsk	44	(0)
2023–	Gomel	43	(11)
2024–2025	→ Dinamo Minsk (loan)	8	(1)
2025	→ Dinamo-2 Minsk (loan)	2	(0)
- * Club domestic league appearances and goals as of 6 July 2026

Daniil Andreyevich Silinsky (Belarusian: Данііл Андрэевіч Сілінскі; Russian: Даниил Андреевич Силинский; born 6 January 2000) is a Belarusian professional footballer who plays for Gomel.
