= Alfred Mazurich =

Belarusian footballer

Personal information
- Date of birth: 5 December 2003 (age 22)
- Place of birth: Grodno, Belarus
- Position: Midfielder

Team information
- Current team: Lida
- Number: 20

Youth career
- 2015–2021: Neman Grodno

Senior career*
Years	Team	Apps	(Gls)
2021–2025	Neman Grodno	7	(0)
2023	→ Lida (loan)	16	(6)
2024	→ Maxline Vitebsk (loan)	30	(7)
2025	→ ML Vitebsk (loan)	3	(1)
2025	→ ML Vitebsk-2 (loan)	1	(0)
2026–	Lida	2	(1)
- * Club domestic league appearances and goals as of 6 July 2026

Alfred Mazurich (Belarusian: Альфрэд Мазурыч; Russian: Альфред Мазурич; born 5 December 2003) is a Belarusian professional footballer who plays for Lida.
