= Ruslan Chobanov =

Russian footballer

Personal information
- Full name: Ruslan Zaurovich Chobanov
- Date of birth: 30 March 2004 (age 22)
- Place of birth: Bataysk, Rostov Oblast, Russia
- Height: 1.78 m (5 ft 10 in)
- Position: Midfielder

Youth career
- 2013–2016: DYuSSh №2 Bataysk
- 2016–2023: Krasnodar

Senior career*
Years	Team	Apps	(Gls)
2023–2026	Krasnodar	0	(0)
2023–2024	→ Krasnodar-2 (loan)	31	(0)
2024	→ Sokol Saratov (loan)	19	(0)
2025	→ Veles Moscow (loan)	14	(0)
2025	→ Dinamo Minsk (loan)	5	(0)
2026	Chayka Peschanokopskoye	10	(0)

International career^{‡}
2019	Russia U-16	5	(1)
2021	Russia U-17	2	(0)
2021	Russia U-18	1	(0)
2023	Russia U-19	1	(0)
2023–	Russia U-21	10	(0)
- * Club domestic league appearances and goals as of 16 May 2026 ‡ National team caps and goals as of 18 November 2025

Ruslan Zaurovich Chobanov (Russian: Руслан Заурович Чобанов; born 30 March 2004) is a Russian footballer who plays as a midfielder.

== Career ==
Chobanov made his debut in the Russian Second League for Krasnodar-2 on 18 August 2023, in a game against Ufa.

He made his debut in the Russian First League for Sokol Saratov on 14 July 2024, in a game against Chayka Peschanokopskoye.

Chobanov made his debut in the Belarusian Premier League for Dinamo Minsk on 10 August 2025 in a game against Torpedo-BelAZ Zhodino.

On 25 January 2026, Chobanov signed a three-year contract with Chayka Peschanokopskoye of the Russian First League.
