= Marshal Józef Piłsudski Athletic and Football Stadium =

Sport stadium in Radom, Poland

Coordinates: 51°24′N 21°12′E

- Stadion Lekkoatletyczno-Piłkarski im. Marszałka Józefa Piłsudskiego
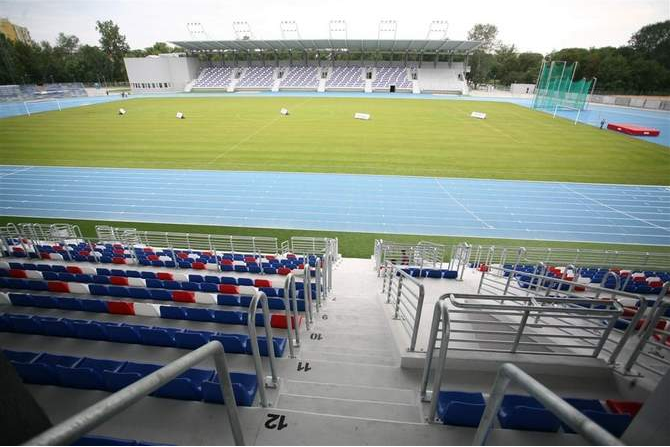
- Interactive map of Marshal Józef Piłsudski Athletic and Football Stadium
- Location: Radom, Poland
- Owner: MOSiR Radom
- Capacity: 4,500

Construction
- Built: 1931

Tenants
- Broń Radom; Radomiak Radom (2015-2023)

The Marshal Józef Piłsudski Athletic and Football Stadium (Polish: Stadion Lekkoatletyczno-Piłkarski im. Marszałka Józefa Piłsudskiego) is a sport stadium located in Radom, Poland at the 9 Narutowicza Street. It is currently used for association football of Broń Radom.

The sports complex at Narutowicza Street in Radom was built as a voluntary activity by the employees of the State Weapons Factory and put into operation in 1931. It included a football pitch, a cycling track, tennis courts, an athletics track and an outdoor swimming pool. Due to the demolition of the Czachor Brothers Stadium and the construction of a new sports complex in its place, from 2015 to 2023 on the facility at Narutowicza 9 street, some matches as the host were played by Radomiak Radom. In the first match at the stadium, after Radomiak's return to Ekstraklasa, the hosts sensationally won 3–1 against the Polish champion Legia Warsaw.

In 2019, the 95th edition of the Polish Athletics Championships was organized there.
