= Gleb Yakushevich =

Belarusian footballer

Personal information
- Date of birth: 31 July 2002 (age 24)
- Place of birth: Minsk, Belarus
- Height: 1.91 m (6 ft 3 in)
- Position: Defender

Team information
- Current team: Belshina Bobruisk
- Number: 78

Youth career
- 2007–2021: Minsk

Senior career*
Years	Team	Apps	(Gls)
2021–2023	Minsk	44	(0)
2024–2025	Shinnik Yaroslavl	5	(0)
2025	→ Arsenal Dzerzhinsk (loan)	4	(0)
2025	→ Alga Bishkek (loan)	11	(0)
2026	Khimik Dzerzhinsk	11	(0)
2026–	Belshina Bobruisk	6	(0)

International career^{‡}
2022–2023	Belarus U21	12	(1)
- * Club domestic league appearances and goals as of 6 September 2026 ‡ National team caps and goals as of 20 November 2023

Gleb Yakushevich (Belarusian: Глеб Якушэвіч; Russian: Глеб Якушевич; born 31 July 2002) is a Belarusian footballer who plays as a defender for Belshina Bobruisk.
