= Gleb Rovdo =

Belarusian footballer (born 2002)

Personal information
- Date of birth: 4 June 2002 (age 24)
- Place of birth: Minsk, Belarus
- Height: 1.84 m (6 ft 0 in)
- Position: Midfielder

Team information
- Current team: Broń Radom
- Number: 9

Youth career
- 2016–2020: Dinamo Minsk

Senior career*
Years	Team	Apps	(Gls)
2020–2022	Dinamo Minsk	1	(0)
2022	→ Isloch Minsk Raion (loan)	20	(1)
2023–2025	Isloch Minsk Raion	51	(11)
2025–2026	Slávia TU Košice	9	(0)
2026	Mławianka Mława	15	(3)
2026–	Broń Radom	5	(5)

International career
2017	Belarus U16	1	(0)
2018–2019	Belarus U17	15	(0)
2019	Belarus U19	4	(1)
2022–2023	Belarus U21	7	(1)
- * Club domestic league appearances and goals as of 21:50, 2 September 2026 (UTC)

Gleb Rovdo (Belarusian: Глеб Роўда; Russian: Глеб Ровдо; born 4 June 2002) is a Belarusian professional footballer who plays as a midfielder for IV liga Masovia club Broń Radom.
