= Nikos Zouglis =

Greek footballer

Personal information
- Full name: Nikolaos Zouglis
- Date of birth: 14 November 2003 (age 22)
- Place of birth: Argos, Greece
- Height: 1.80 m (5 ft 11 in)
- Position: Winger

Team information
- Current team: Olympiacos B
- Number: 79

Youth career
- 2019–2021: Asteras Tripolis

Senior career*
Years	Team	Apps	(Gls)
2022–2025	Asteras Tripolis	53	(0)
2025–	Olympiacos B	25	(6)

International career^{‡}
2023–2024	Greece U21	10	(1)
- * Club domestic league appearances and goals as of 20 September 2026 ‡ National team caps and goals as of 15 October 2024

Nikos Zouglis (Greek: Νίκος Ζουγλής; born 14 November 2003) is a Greek professional footballer who plays as a Winger for Super League 2 club Olympiacos B.

== Career ==
Zouglis comes from the youth ranks of Asteras Tripolis.

== Career statistics ==
As of match played 21 June 2024

Club	Season	League			Cup		Continental		Other		Total	
Club	Season	Division	Apps	Goals	Apps	Goals	Apps	Goals	Apps	Goals	Apps	Goals
Asteras Tripolis	2022–23	Super League Greece	6	0	0	0	—		—		6	0
Asteras Tripolis	2023–24	Super League Greece	28	0	3	0	—		—		31	0
Asteras Tripolis	2024–25	Super League Greece	19	0	2	0			—		21	0
Asteras Tripolis	Total		53	0	5	0	0	0	—		58	0
Olympiacos B	2025–26	Super League Greece 2	0	0	0	0	—		—		0	0
Career Total			53	0	5	0	0	0	0	0	58	0
