= List of Greek football transfers summer 2022 =

This is a list of Greek football transfers summer 2022.

== Greek Super League ==
=== AEK Athens ===
In:

No.	Pos.	Nation	Player
—	DF	FRA	Djibril Sidibé (from (France) AS Monaco FC)
—	DF	CMR	Harold Moukoudi (from (France) AS Saint-Étienne)
—	FW	NED	Tom van Weert (from Volos F.C.)
—	MF	SWE	Niclas Eliasson (from (France) Nîmes Olympique)
—	GK	GRE	Georgios Athanasiadis (Loan return from (Moldova) Sheriff Tiraspol)
—	DF	CRO	Domagoj Vida (from (Turkey) Beşiktaş)
—	MF	GRE	Theodosis Macheras (Loan return from Ionikos)
—	MF	GRE	Giannis Fivos Botos (Loan return from (Netherlands) Go Ahead Eagles)
—	MF	SUI	Steven Zuber (from (Germany) Eintracht Frankfurt)
—	MF	DEN	Jens Jønsson (from (Spain) Cádiz)
—	MF	MEX	Orbelín Pineda (loan from (Spain) Celta)
—	MF	SRB	Mijat Gaćinović (from (Germany) TSG Hoffenheim)
—	FW	SRB	Miloš Deletić (Loan return from (Cyprus) Anorthosis Famagusta)
—	FW	GRE	Christos Albanis (Loan return from (Cyprus) Apollon Limassol)

Out:

No.	Pos.	Nation	Player
—	DF	FRA	Clément Michelin (Loan to (France) FC Girondins de Bordeaux)
—	DF	SLO	Žiga Laci (Loan to (Slovenia) FC Koper)
—	FW	GRE	Christos Albanis (Loan to (Spain) FC Andorra)
—	FW	IRI	Karim Ansarifard (to (Cyprus) AC Omonia)
—	DF	GRE	Michalis Bakakis (to Panetolikos)
—	MF	FRA	Damien Le Tallec (to (Russia) Torpedo Moscow)
—	FW	SWE	Muamer Tanković (to (Cyprus) Pafos FC)
—	DF	BIH	Ognjen Vranješ (to (Turkey) Hatayspor)
—	DF	ALB	Mario Mitaj (to (Russia) Lokomotiv Moscow)
—	MF	SUI	Steven Zuber (Loan return to (Germany) Eintracht Frankfurt)
—	MF	GRE	Stratos Svarnas (Loan to (Poland) Raków Częstochowa)
—	MF	POR	André Simões (to (Portugal) Famalicão)
—	MF	POL	Grzegorz Krychowiak (Loan return to (Russia) Krasnodar)
—	MF	SUI	Darko Jevtić (Loan return to (Russia) Rubin Kazan)
—	MF	UKR	Yevhen Shakhov (End of Contract)
—	MF	GRE	Giannis Fivos Botos (Loan to (Moldova) Sheriff Tiraspol)
—	FW	SRB	Miloš Deletić (to Volos)

=== Aris Thessaloniki ===
In:

No.	Pos.	Nation	Player
—	FW	POR	Rafael Camacho (Loan from (Portugal) Sporting CP)
—	MF	NGR	Peter Etebo (Loan from (England) Stoke City)
—	MF	HON	Edwin Rodríguez (Loan from (Honduras) C.D. Olimpia)
—	FW	JAM	Andre Gray (from (England) Watford F.C.)
—	DF	CGO	Bradley Mazikou (from (Bulgaria) CSKA Sofia)
—	MF	BFA	Bryan Dabo (from (Turkey) Çaykur Rizespor)
—	DF	CMR	Nicolas Nkoulou (from (England) Watford F.C.)
—	MF	ESP	Manu García (from (Spain) Sporting Gijón)
—	DF	BEL	Marvin Peersman (from PAS Giannina)
—	MF	SEN	Pape Cheikh Diop (from (France) Lyon)
—	MF	ENG	Moses Odubajo (from (England) Queens Park Rangers)
—	FW	CIV	Gervinho (from (Turkey) Trabzonspor)

Out:

No.	Pos.	Nation	Player
—	FW	IRQ	Mohanad Ali (Loan return to (Qatar) Al-Duhail)
—	MF	NED	Lerin Duarte (End of Contract)
—	DF	GHA	Lumor (End of Contract)
—	DF	AUT	Emanuel Šakić (End of Contract)
—	FW	POR	Bruno Gama (to (Cyprus) AEK Larnaca)
—	FW	GRE	Dimitrios Manos (to (Turkey) Bandırmaspor)
—	MF	SEN	Badou Ndiaye (to (Turkey) Adana Demirspor)
—	DF	TUN	Yohan Benalouane (to (Italy) Novara F.C.)
—	MF	ARG	Facundo Bertoglio (to Asteras Tripolis)
—	MF	BRA	Lucas Sasha (to (Brazil) Fortaleza Esporte Clube)
—	DF	GRE	Panagiotis Tsagalidis (to Panserraikos)
—	GK	BRA	Denis (to (Brazil) Sport Recife)
—	DF	GRE	Kyriakos Aslanidis (to Volos F.C.)
—	FW	ESP	Cristian López (to (Spain) Eldense)
—	MF	ESP	Javier Matilla (to Volos F.C.)
—	DF	GRE	Georgios Delizisis (to Niki Volos)
—	DF	ROU	Cristian Ganea (to Panathinaikos)
—	DF	SWE	Daniel Sundgren (to (Israel) Maccabi Haifa)
—	FW	GRE	Kostas Mitroglou (End of Contract)
—	FW	MTN	Aboubakar Kamara (to Olympiacos)

=== Asteras Tripolis ===
In:

No.	Pos.	Nation	Player
—	DF	BIH	Ervin Zukanović (from (Turkey) Fatih Karagümrük)
—	FW	ARG	Julián Bartolo (from Volos F.C.)
—	MF	ARG	Facundo Bertoglio (from Aris Thessaloniki F.C.)
—	FW	IDN	Bagus Kahfi (from (Netherlands) Jong Utrecht)
—	MF	ESP	Juan Domínguez (from PAS Giannina)
—	DF	NGR	Oluwatobiloba Alagbe (Loan return from (Luxembourg) Jeunesse Esch)
—	DF	GRE	Alexandros Kardaris (Loan return from Ierapetra)
—	MF	NGR	Timipere Johnson Eboh (Loan return from Episkopi)
—	MF	USA	Caleb Stanko (from PAS Giannina)
—	MF	GER	Michael Gardawski (from PAS Giannina)
—	FW	NGR	Sudais Ali Baba (Loan return from Xanthi)

Out:

No.	Pos.	Nation	Player
—	DF	GRE	Giannis Christopoulos (Loan to (Croatia) Slaven Belupo)
—	FW	CMR	Kévin Soni (Loan to (Turkey) Hatayspor)
—	FW	NGR	Sudais Ali Baba (to (Slovakia) Spartak Trnava)
—	DF	NGR	Oluwatobiloba Alagbe (Loan to (Luxembourg) Progrès Niederkorn)
—	MF	NGR	Timipere Johnson Eboh (Loan to Panathinaikos B)
—	DF	GRE	Alexandros Kardaris (to Anagennisi Karditsa)

=== Atromitos ===
In:

No.	Pos.	Nation	Player
—	FW	GRE	Antonis Trimmatis (Loan return from Egaleo F.C.)
—	MF	GRE	Giannis Ikonomidis (Loan return from A.E. Kifisia F.C.)
—	DF	GRE	Nikos Athanasiou (Loan return from Niki Volos)
—	DF	ESP	Dani Suárez (from (Saudi Arabia) Abha Club)
—	MF	ISL	Samúel Friðjónsson (from (Norway) Viking FK)
—	DF	TUN	Wajdi Kechrida (from (Italy) Salernitana)
—	MF	ESP	Eder González (from (Romania) Sepsi OSK)
—	FW	FRA	Gaëtan Robail (from (France) RC Lens)
—	DF	BEL	Laurens De Bock (from (Belgium) Zulte Waregem)
—	FW	ISL	Viðar Örn Kjartansson (from (Norway) Vålerenga Fotball)
—	MF	AUT	Andreas Kuen (from (Austria) Sturm Graz)

Out:

No.	Pos.	Nation	Player
—	MF	SRB	Đorđe Denić (loan return to (Cyprus) Apollon Limassol)
—	FW	ROU	Denis Alibec (loan return to (Turkey) Kayserispor)
—	FW	AUT	Srđan Spiridonović (loan return to (Serbia) Red Star Belgrade)
—	DF	ESP	Dani Castellano (End of Contract)
—	DF	GRE	Alexandros Kartalis (End of Contract)
—	DF	GRE	Stavros Vasilantonopoulos (End of Contract)
—	FW	GRE	Antonis Trimmatis (loan to Panachaiki)
—	MF	AUT	Patrick Salomon (to (Croatia) HNK Šibenik)
—	FW	GRE	Georgios Daviotis (to Proodeftiki)
—	MF	BRA	Thomás Bedinelli (to (Brazil) Chapecoense)
—	DF	GRE	Spyros Natsos (to Panserraikos)
—	MF	GRE	Charis Charisis (to (Turkey) Sivasspor)
—	FW	GRE	Efthymis Koulouris (to (Austria) LASK)
—	DF	GRE	Kyriakos Papadopoulos (End of Contract)

=== Ionikos ===
In:

No.	Pos.	Nation	Player
—	FW	GER	Reagy Ofosu (from (Turkey) Bursaspor)
—	DF	AUT	Emanuel Šakić (from Aris Thessaloniki F.C.)
—	FW	BRA	Sebá (from (Saudi Arabia) Al Shabab)
—	MF	GHA	Raman Chibsah (from Apollon Smyrnis)
—	DF	POR	Hugo Sousa (from (Romania) Sepsi OSK)
—	FW	ARG	Maximiliano Lovera (Loan from Olympiacos)
—	MF	FRA	Bandiougou Fadiga (Loan from Olympiacos)
—	FW	ARG	Javier Mendoza (from Panetolikos)
—	FW	GRE	Sotirios Kokkinis (from Ergotelis)
—	FW	GRE	Christos Eleftheriadis (from PAS Lamia 1964)
—	DF	ARG	Federico Milo (from (Argentina) Aldosivi)
—	MF	GRE	Christos Ioannidis (from Trikala)
—	MF	SYR	Aias Aosman (from (Turkey) Adana Demirspor)
—	GK	ALB	Armando Përlleshi (from Trikala)
—	DF	FRA	Fabien Antunes (from Panetolikos)
—	MF	GRE	Georgios Servilakis (from Ergotelis)
—	MF	FRA	Zinédine Machach (from (Italy) Napoli)
—	FW	GRE	Nikolaos Ioannidis (from Apollon Smyrnis)

Out:

No.	Pos.	Nation	Player
—	FW	BRA	Thuram (Loan return to (Portugal) GD Alvarenga)
—	DF	GRE	Nikos Vafeas (End of Contract)
—	DF	ARG	Salvador Sánchez (End of Contract)
—	MF	CPV	Jerson Cabral (End of Contract)
—	FW	GRE	Georgios Manalis (to Chania FC)
—	MF	GRE	Giannis Gotsoulias (to GS Ilioupolis)
—	FW	POR	Ricardo Valente (to (Romania) CS Mioveni)
—	FW	GRE	Lefteris Matsoukas (to GS Ilioupolis)
—	GK	SLO	Nejc Vidmar (Loan return to (Slovenia) Olimpija Ljubljana)
—	DF	GRE	Giannis Kiakos (to PAS Giannina)
—	MF	GRE	Theodosis Macheras (Loan return to AEK Athens)
—	MF	SUI	Vullnet Basha (to (Poland) Wisła Kraków)
—	MF	COL	Reinaldo Lenis (to (Saudi Arabia) Al-Adalah)
—	MF	POR	Dálcio (to (Cyprus) APOEL)
—	MF	SYR	Aias Aosman (End of Contract)

=== Lamia ===
In:

No.	Pos.	Nation	Player
—	FW	GRE	Konstantinos Nikolopoulos (loan return from A.O. Ypato F.C.)
—	MF	MKD	Stefan Ashkovski (from (Romania) Sepsi OSK)
—	MF	GRE	Theodoros Vasilakakis (from Chania FC)
—	FW	GHA	Richmond Boakye (from (Israel) Beitar Jerusalem)
—	DF	GRE	Georgios Kornezos (from AEK Athens B)
—	DF	ARG	Oliver Benítez (from (Argentina) Club Atlético Patronato)
—	DF	BUL	Ivan Goranov (from (Belgium) Charleroi)
—	MF	ARG	Tomás De Vincenti (from (Cyprus) APOEL)
—	MF	LTU	Vykintas Slivka (from Apollon Smyrnis)
—	MF	GRE	Sotiris Tsiloulis (from Apollon Smyrnis)
—	MF	GRE	Paris Babis (from AEK Athens B)
—	MF	BRA	Gustavo Marmentini (from (Israel) Hapoel Hadera)
—	FW	GRE	Petros Giakoumakis (from Veria)

Out:

No.	Pos.	Nation	Player
—	DF	ESP	Ángel Martínez (end of contract)
—	DF	GRE	Loukas Vyntra (end of contract)
—	MF	ESP	Tyronne del Pino (to (Thailand) Nakhon Ratchasima)
—	FW	GEO	Bachana Arabuli (to (Australia) Macarthur FC)
—	MF	GRE	Vasilios Troumpoulos (to AEK Athens B F.C.)
—	DF	BRA	Lucão (to (United Arab Emirates) Al-Nasr SC)
—	FW	GRE	Apostolos Vellios (to (Netherlands) PEC Zwolle)
—	FW	GRE	Christos Eleftheriadis (to Ionikos F.C.)
—	FW	GRE	Anestis Vlachomitros (to Olympiacos B)
—	DF	GRE	Kyriakos Mazoulouxis (to A.E. Kifisia F.C.)
—	DF	GRE	Giannis Skondras (to P.O. Fiki F.C.)
—	FW	GRE	Georgios Manousakis (to Iraklis)
—	MF	GEO	Nika Ninua (Loan return to PAOK)
—	MF	GUI	Lass Bangoura (Loan return to (Spain) Rayo Vallecano)

=== Levadiakos ===
In:

No.	Pos.	Nation	Player
—	MF	MLI	Bakary Sako (from (France) AS Saint-Étienne)
—	FW	GRE	Giannis Gianniotas (from Apollon Smyrnis)
—	FW	MTN	Souleymane Doukara (from (Turkey) Giresunspor)
—	FW	BRA	Jonas Toró (Loan from Panathinaikos F.C.)
—	FW	ROU	Adrian Petre (from (Romania) Farul Constanța)
—	DF	BRA	Vinícius (from (Cyprus) APOEL)
—	DF	GRE	Antonis Dentakis (from Apollon Smyrnis)
—	MF	SVK	Michal Škvarka (from (Poland) Wisła Kraków)
—	MF	GRE	Christos Voutsas (from Ergotelis)
—	MF	BRA	Régis (from (United Arab Emirates) Hatta Club)
—	FW	COD	Kazenga LuaLua (from (Turkey) Gençlerbirliği)
—	MF	FRA	Anthony Belmonte (from (France) Grenoble Foot)
—	GK	POL	Grzegorz Sandomierski (from (Poland) Górnik Zabrze)
—	GK	MNE	Vuko Vujović (Loan return from Olympiacos Volos)
—	MF	GRE	Tilemachos Karabas (Loan return from Panathinaikos B)
—	MF	GRE	Christos Albanis (Loan return from Panathinaikos B)
—	FW	GRE	Theodoros Tsirigotis (Loan return from Panathinaikos B)

Out:

No.	Pos.	Nation	Player
—	FW	GRE	Christos Aravidis (End of Contract)
—	MF	CIV	Emmanuel Koné (End of Contract)
—	MF	GRE	Serafim Maniotis (End of Contract)
—	MF	GRE	Christos Voutsas (Loan to Panathinaikos B)
—	FW	BRA	Gabriel Barbosa (Loan to (Albania) FK Kukësi)
—	FW	CYP	Nestoras Mytidis (to Panachaiki)
—	FW	GRE	Christos Albanis (to Panathinaikos B)
—	FW	BRA	Lucas Poletto (to (Brazil) Criciúma Esporte Clube)
—	MF	GRE	Manolis Rovithis (End of Contract)
—	MF	GRE	Panagiotis Linardos (End of Contract)
—	MF	ESP	Nili (End of Contract)

=== OFI ===
In:

No.	Pos.	Nation	Player
—	FW	MLI	Nouha Dicko (from (Turkey) Yeni Malatyaspor)
—	FW	POR	Mesaque Djú (from (England) West Ham United)
—	MF	ESP	Luis Perea (Loan from (Spain) CD Leganés)
—	FW	ALG	Mehdi Zerkane (Loan from (France) FC Girondins de Bordeaux)
—	FW	CGO	Thievy Bifouma (from (Turkey) Bursaspor)
—	FW	ESP	Miguel Ángel Guerrero (from (Spain) UD Ibiza)
—	MF	SEN	Assane Dioussé (from (France) AS Saint-Étienne)
—	DF	FRA	Samuel Yohou (from (France) USL Dunkerque)
—	DF	ISL	Guðmundur Þórarinsson (from (Denmark) AaB Fodbold)
—	GK	NED	Sonny Stevens (from (Netherlands) SC Cambuur)
—	DF	SWE	Eric Larsson (from (Sweden) Malmö FF)
—	MF	GRE	Manolis Sbokos (Loan return from Kifisia)
—	MF	GRE	Vangelis Nikokyrakis (Loan return from Episkopi)
—	MF	GRE	Frixos Grivas (Loan return from Kalamata)
—	FW	GRE	Alexandros Gargalatzidis (Loan return from Olympiacos Volos)
—	FW	BRA	Felipe Souza (Loan return from Kifisia)

Out:

No.	Pos.	Nation	Player
—	FW	BRA	Felipe Souza (to (Albania) KF Bylis)
—	FW	NED	Mike van Duinen (to (Netherlands) Excelsior Rotterdam)
—	DF	SYR	Abdul Rahman Weiss (to Volos F.C.)
—	FW	GRE	Alexandros Gargalatzidis (to Kifisia)
—	GK	CMR	Devis Epassy (to (Saudi Arabia) Abha Club)
—	GK	NED	Boy Waterman (to (Netherlands) PSV)
—	MF	GRE	Vangelis Nikokyrakis (to Kifisia)
—	MF	BRA	Luiz Phellype (Loan return to (Portugal) Sporting CP B)
—	MF	GRE	Lazaros Lamprou (Loan return to PAOK)
—	MF	LUX	Vahid Selimović (End of Contract)
—	MF	GRE	Odysseas Lymperakis (to Volos)
—	MF	GRE	Nikos Korovesis (to Apollon Smyrnis)
—	MF	NED	Jonathan de Guzmán (to (Netherlands) Sparta Rotterdam)
—	FW	NED	Luc Castaignos (End of Contract)

=== Olympiacos ===
In:

No.	Pos.	Nation	Player
—	GK	GRE	Alexandros Paschalakis (from PAOK FC)
—	MF	SUI	Pajtim Kasami (from (Switzerland) FC Basel)
—	MF	MLI	Diadie Samassékou (Loan from (Germany) TSG 1899 Hoffenheim)
—	FW	USA	Konrad de la Fuente (Loan from (France) Olympique de Marseille)
—	FW	ENG	Josh Bowler (Loan from (England) Nottingham Forest)
—	FW	KOR	Hwang Ui-jo (Loan from (England) Nottingham Forest)
—	DF	GRE	Panagiotis Retsos (Loan from (Italy) Hellas Verona F.C.)
—	FW	COD	Cédric Bakambu (from (France) Olympique de Marseille)
—	MF	COL	James Rodríguez (from (Qatar) Al-Rayyan SC)
—	MF	KOR	Hwang In-beom (from (Russia) Rubin Kazan)
—	DF	BRA	Marcelo (from (Spain) Real Madrid)
—	MF	ESP	Pep Biel (from (Denmark) Copenhagen)
—	DF	ITA	Adrian Galliani (from Panionios)
—	DF	POR	Rúben Semedo (Loan return from (Portugal) Porto)
—	DF	GRE	Giannis Masouras (Loan return from (Netherlands) Sparta Rotterdam)
—	DF	GRE	Leonardo Koutris (Loan return from (Germany) Fortuna Düsseldorf)
—	DF	ESP	Pipa (from (England) Huddersfield)
—	DF	CRO	Šime Vrsaljko (from (Spain) Atlético Madrid)
—	MF	POR	Pêpê (Loan return from (Portugal) Famalicão)
—	DF	ISR	Doron Leidner (from (Israel) Hapoel Tel Aviv)
—	MF	SRB	Nikola Čumić (Loan return from (Switzerland) Luzern)
—	MF	SRB	Lazar Ranđelović (Loan return from (Spain) Leganés)
—	MF	ARG	Maximiliano Lovera (Loan return from (Cyprus) Omonia)
—	MF	GRE	Fotis Kitsos (Loan return from Olympiacos B)
—	MF	DEN	Philip Zinckernagel (Loan return from (England) Watford)
—	FW	EGY	Ahmed Hassan (Loan return from (Turkey) Konyaspor)
—	FW	CZE	Denis Alijagić (from (Czech Republic) Slavia Prague)
—	FW	MTN	Aboubakar Kamara (from Aris)

Out:

No.	Pos.	Nation	Player
—	FW	DEN	Philip Zinckernagel (on loan to (Belgium) Standard Liège)
—	FW	EGY	Ahmed Hassan (on loan to (Turkey) Alanyaspor)
—	MF	POR	João Carvalho (on loan to (Portugal) G.D. Estoril Praia)
—	MF	POR	Pêpê (on loan to (Turkey) Ankaragücü)
—	DF	GRE	Kostas Manolas (to (United Arab Emirates) Sharjah FC)
—	MF	GUI	Mamadou Kané (on loan to (Cyprus) Pafos FC)
—	MF	FRA	Bandiougou Fadiga (on loan to Ionikos F.C.)
—	DF	GRE	Fotis Kitsos (on loan to (Cyprus) AC Omonia)
—	GK	GRE	Ilias Karargyris (to Proodeftiki)
—	FW	SRB	Lazar Ranđelović (to (Russia) Ural Yekaterinburg)
—	FW	BRA	Tiquinho Soares (to (Brazil) Botafogo de Futebol e Regatas)
—	MF	GUI	Mady Camara (on loan to (Italy) A.S. Roma)
—	DF	POR	Rúben Semedo (to (Qatar) Al-Duhail)
—	DF	POL	Michał Karbownik (Loan return to (England) Brighton & Hove Albion)
—	DF	SRB	Svetozar Marković (to (Serbia) Partizan)
—	DF	GRE	Petros Bagalianis (on loan to PAS Giannina)
—	MF	POR	Rony Lopes (Loan return to (Spain) Sevilla)
—	MF	GRE	Georgios Xenitidis (to Panetolikos)
—	MF	ARG	Maximiliano Lovera (on loan to Ionikos F.C.)
—	MF	GRE	Vasilis Sourlis (loan to (Netherlands) Fortuna Sittard)
—	MF	GRE	Dimitris Pinakas (loan to (Cyprus) Apollon Limassol)
—	MF	NGR	Henry Onyekuru (to (Turkey) Adana Demirspor)

=== Panathinaikos ===
In:

No.	Pos.	Nation	Player
—	MF	FRA	Alexis Trouillet (from (France) OGC Nice)
—	FW	BRA	Jonas Toró (from (Brazil) São Paulo FC)
—	MF	BRA	Bernard (from (United Arab Emirates) Sharjah FC)
—	MF	ALB	Enis Çokaj (from (Croatia) Lokomotiva Zagreb)
—	FW	SLO	Andraž Šporar (from (Portugal) Sporting CP)
—	GK	RUS	Yuri Lodygin (from PAS Giannina)
—	DF	ISL	Hörður Magnússon (from (Russia) CSKA Moscow)
—	DF	ROU	Cristian Ganea (from Aris)
—	MF	POR	António Xavier (Loan return from (Portugal) Estoril)
—	MF	SLO	Adam Gnezda Čerin (from (Germany) 1. FC Nürnberg)
—	MF	SLO	Benjamin Verbič (from (Ukraine) Dynamo Kyiv)
—	FW	GRE	Argyris Kampetsis (Loan return from (Netherlands) Willem II)

Out:

No.	Pos.	Nation	Player
—	FW	BRA	Jonas Toró (Loan to Levadiakos)
—	FW	ESP	Carlitos (to (Poland) Legia Warsaw)
—	MF	GRE	Sotiris Alexandropoulos (to (Portugal) Sporting CP)
—	DF	GRE	Ilias Chatzitheodoridis (to Panetolikos)
—	DF	ESP	Fran Vélez (to (Saudi Arabia) Al Fateh)
—	MF	SRB	Mijat Gaćinović (Loan return to (Germany) 1899 Hoffenheim)
—	MF	BRA	Mateus Vital (Loan return to (Brazil) Corinthians)
—	MF	SWE	Ramon Pascal Lundqvist (Loan return to (Netherlands) Groningen)
—	MF	GRE	Anastasios Chatzigiovanis (to (Turkey) Ankaragücü)
—	MF	ARG	Lucas Villafáñez (End of Contract)
—	MF	DEN	Uffe Bech (End of Contract)
—	MF	BRA	Maurício (End of Contract)
—	MF	MAR	Yassin Ayoub (to (Netherlands) Excelsior)
—	FW	ITA	Federico Macheda (to (Turkey) Ankaragücü)

=== Panetolikos ===
In:

No.	Pos.	Nation	Player
—	FW	GRE	Alexandros Kavvadias (loan return from Egaleo F.C.)
—	FW	POR	João Pedro (from (Turkey) Bursaspor)
—	DF	ROU	Sebastian Mladen (from (Romania) Farul Constanța)
—	FW	GEO	Levan Shengelia (from (Belgium) OH Leuven)
—	FW	GRE	Dimitris Kolovos (from (Turkey) Kocaelispor)
—	DF	GRE	Michalis Bakakis (from AEK Athens F.C.)
—	GK	GRE	Antonis Stergiakis (from (England) Blackburn Rovers)
—	GK	GRE	Vangelis Kontogiannis (loan return from Panargiakos)
—	DF	GRE	Ilias Chatzitheodoridis (from Panathinaikos)
—	DF	GRE	Stathis Belevonis (loan return from Kavala)
—	MF	GRE	Georgios Xenitidis (from Olympiacos B)
—	FW	GRE	Spyros Skondras (loan return from Episkopi)

Out:

No.	Pos.	Nation	Player
—	MF	GRE	Christos Belevonis (Loan to Veria)
—	FW	GRE	Alexandros Kavvadias (to Haidari F.C.)
—	FW	ARG	Javier Mendoza (to Ionikos)
—	DF	GRE	Stathis Belevonis (to Apollon Pontus)
—	DF	GRE	Gerasimos Bakadimas (to PAS Giannina)
—	DF	ARG	Elías Pereyra (to (Argentina) Godoy Cruz Antonio Tomba)
—	GK	GRE	Nikos Melissas (to (Cyprus) Nea Salamina)
—	GK	ARG	Diego Matías Rodríguez (End of Contract)
—	DF	FRA	Fabien Antunes (to Ionikos)
—	MF	POR	Hélder Barbosa (End of Contract)
—	MF	CRO	Branko Vrgoč (End of Contract)
—	MF	ARG	Braian Lluy (End of Contract)
—	FW	GRE	Nikos Vergos (to (Austria) Wolfsberger AC)

=== PAOK ===
In:

No.	Pos.	Nation	Player
—	MF	POR	André Ricardo (from (Portugal) F.C. Famalicão)
—	FW	ESP	Brandon Thomas (from (Spain) Málaga CF)
—	FW	GER	Khaled Narey (from (Germany) Fortuna Düsseldorf)
—	GK	CRO	Dominik Kotarski (from (Netherlands) Ajax)
—	DF	NOR	Ivan Näsberg (from (Norway) Vålerenga)
—	DF	GRE	Giannis Kargas (from PAS Giannina)
—	MF	URU	Nicolás Quagliata (from (Uruguay) Wanderers)
—	MF	POR	Rafa Soares (from (Portugal) Vitória Guimarães)
—	MF	ESP	Joan Sastre (from (Spain) Mallorca)
—	MF	GEO	Nika Ninua (Loan return from Lamia)
—	MF	GRE	Georgios Vrakas (Loan return from Levadiakos)
—	MF	GRE	Lazaros Lamprou (Loan return from OFI)
—	MF	POR	Tiago Dantas (Loan from (Portugal) Benfica)
—	MF	GRE	Pavlos Logaras (Loan return from Volos)

Out:

No.	Pos.	Nation	Player
—	DF	BRA	Lucas Taylor (loan to (Ukraine) Shakhtar Donetsk)
—	FW	BRA	Léo Jabá (Free Agent)
—	DF	ALB	Enea Mihaj (to (Portugal) F.C. Famalicão)
—	MF	GRE	Theocharis Tsingaras (Loan to (France) Toulouse FC)
—	FW	GRE	Lazaros Lamprou (to (Netherlands) Excelsior Rotterdam)
—	FW	CRO	Antonio Čolak (to (Scotland) Rangers F.C.)
—	GK	GRE	Alexandros Paschalakis (Free Agent)
—	DF	ESP	José Ángel Crespo (to (Cyprus) APOEL)
—	MF	GRE	Panagiotis Tzimas (loan to PAS Giannina)
—	MF	ROU	Alexandru Mitriță (Loan return to (United States) New York City FC)
—	MF	BRA	Sidcley (Loan return to (Ukraine) Dynamo Kyiv)
—	MF	CPV	Fernando Varela (to (Portugal) Casa Pia)
—	FW	ENG	Chuba Akpom (Loan return to (England) Middlesbrough)

=== PAS Giannina ===
In:

No.	Pos.	Nation	Player
—	DF	GRE	Gerasimos Bakadimas (from Panetolikos)
—	FW	ROU	Claudiu Bălan (from (Romania) FC U Craiova 1948)
—	GK	FRA	Jérôme Prior (from (Spain) Cartagena)
—	DF	GRE	Angelos Tsavos (from Episkopi)
—	DF	GRE	Giannis Kiakos (from Ionikos)
—	DF	GRE	Petros Bagalianis (loan from Olympiacos)
—	MF	GRE	Panagiotis Tzimas (loan from PAOK)
—	MF	ESP	Carles Soria (from (Portugal) Estoril)
—	MF	GRE	Stavros Pilios (Loan return Iraklis Thessaloniki)
—	MF	ESP	Iker Bilbao (from (Spain) Amorebieta)
—	MF	NED	Daan Rienstra (from Volos)
—	MF	CIV	Manssour Fofana (from Veria)
—	FW	COL	Kevin Rosero (from Volos)
—	FW	AUS	Apostolos Stamatelopoulos (from Rodos)
—	FW	GRE	Georgios Pamlidis (from Apollon Smyrnis)
—	FW	FRA	Jean-Baptiste Léo (from (Latvia) Riga)

Out:

No.	Pos.	Nation	Player
—	FW	GRE	Panagiotis Triadis (End of Contract)
—	MF	GRE	Alexis Triadis (End of Contract)
—	GK	RUS	Yuri Lodygin (to Panathinaikos)
—	DF	GER	Michael Gardawski (End of Contract)
—	DF	GRE	Manolis Saliakas (to (Germany) FC St. Pauli)
—	DF	GRE	Antonis Ikonomopoulos (to Volos)
—	DF	BEL	Marvin Peersman (to Aris)
—	DF	GRE	Giannis Kargas (to PAOK)
—	MF	GRE	Stefanos Siontis (to Panserraikos)
—	MF	ARG	Fabricio Brener (Loan Return to (Argentina) Belgrano)
—	MF	GER	Jan-Marc Schneider (End of Contract)
—	MF	USA	Caleb Stanko (to Asteras Tripolis)
—	MF	GRE	Dimitrios Karagiannis (Released)
—	MF	ESP	Juan Domínguez (Released)
—	FW	COL	Juan José Perea (to (Germany) VfB Stuttgart)

=== Volos ===
In:

No.	Pos.	Nation	Player
—	MF	ITA	Cristian Battocchio (from (Mexico) Club Universidad Nacional)
—	FW	GRE	Georgios Koutsias (Loan from PAOK)
—	FW	SRB	Ognjen Ožegović (from (Turkey) Manisa F.K.)
—	DF	ESP	Antonio Luna (from (Spain) FC Cartagena)
—	FW	FRA	Anthony Knockaert (Loan from (England) Fulham F.C.)
—	MF	URU	Nicolás Mezquida (from (United States) Colorado Rapids)
—	MF	ESP	Javier Matilla (from Aris Thessaloniki F.C.)
—	DF	GRE	Kyriakos Aslanidis (from Aris Thessaloniki F.C.)
—	DF	SYR	Abdul Rahman Weiss (from OFI)
—	MF	GRE	Sarantis Tselebakis (from Xanthi F.C.)
—	GK	GRE	Panagiotis Avgerinos (from Aittitos Spata)
—	DF	GRE	Antonis Ikonomopoulos (from PAS Giannina)
—	MF	ESP	Víctor Fernández (from (Spain) Cornellà)
—	MF	GRE	Stathis Tachatos (from PAOK B)
—	MF	GRE	Ilias Tselios (from Xanthi)
—	MF	FIN	Juha Pirinen (from (Slovakia) AS Trenčín)
—	MF	POR	João Escoval (from (Cyprus) Anorthosis)
—	MF	GRE	Odysseas Lymperakis (from OFI)
—	FW	SRB	Bogdan Stamenković (from Kavala)
—	FW	SRB	Miloš Deletić (from AEK Athens)

Out:

No.	Pos.	Nation	Player
—	MF	POR	Alex Soares (End of Contract)
—	DF	SUI	Levent Gülen (to (Poland) Miedź Legnica)
—	FW	ARG	Julián Bartolo (to Asteras Tripolis)
—	FW	GRE	Alexandros Tereziou (to Panathinaikos B)
—	DF	ARG	Franco Ferrari (to (Cyprus) APOEL)
—	FW	NED	Tom van Weert (to AEK Athens F.C.)
—	MF	COL	Kevin Rosero (to PAS Giannina)
—	MF	NED	Daan Rienstra (to PAS Giannina)
—	MF	GRE	Sotiris Ninis (End of Contract)
—	MF	MAR	Adrien Regattin (End of Contract)
—	MF	ARG	Emiliano Purita (to (Ukraine) Dnipro-1)
—	MF	ARG	Jorge Correa (End of Contract)
—	MF	SUI	Jean-Pierre Rhyner (End of Contract)
—	MF	ARG	Nicolás Oroz (Loan return to (Argentina) Racing Club)
—	MF	GRE	Pavlos Logaras (Loan return to PAOK)
—	FW	URU	Franco Romero (End of Contract)

== Greek Super League 2 ==
=== AEK Athens B ===
In:

No.	Pos.	Nation	Player
—	DF	GRE	Spyros Chatzikyriakos (from Fostiras)
—	FW	FRA	Yanis Ammour (loan return from Kavala)

Out:

No.	Pos.	Nation	Player
—	MF	GRE	Paris Babis (to Lamia)
—	MF	GRE	Georgios Giannoutsos
—	MF	GRE	Michalis Bousis

=== Apollon Smyrnis ===
In:

No.	Pos.	Nation	Player
—	MF	GRE	Nikos Korovesis (From OFI)

Out:

No.	Pos.	Nation	Player
—	DF	NOR	Thomas Rogne (to (Sweden) Helsingborgs IF)
—	MF	GRE	Sotiris Tsiloulis (to Lamia)
—	MF	LUX	Vykintas Slivka (to Lamia)
—	FW	GRE	Nikolaos Ioannidis (to Ionikos)
—	FW	GRE	Georgios Pamlidis (to PAS Giannina)

=== Episkopi ===
In:

No.	Pos.	Nation	Player
—	DF	GRE	Theodoros Petrakis (From Apollon Larissa)
—	MF	FRA	Abdoulaye Ouattara (From (Slovenia) Senica)
—	MF	GHA	Randy Dwumfour (From (Albania) Skënderbeu)
—	MF	GEO	Davit Samurkasovi (From (Georgia (country)) Locomotive Tbilisi)
—	FW	USA	Ryan Sierakowski (From (United States) New England Revolution II)
—	FW	CMR	Alain Ebwelle (From (Finland) KTP)

Out:

No.	Pos.	Nation	Player
—	DF	GRE	Angelos Tsavos (to PAS Giannina)
—	MF	NGR	Timipere Johnson Eboh (Loan return to Asteras Tripolis)
—	MF	GRE	Vangelis Nikokyrakis (Loan return to OFI)
—	FW	GRE	Spyros Skondras (to Panetolikos)

=== Olympiacos B ===
In:

No.	Pos.	Nation	Player

Out:

No.	Pos.	Nation	Player

=== Panathinaikos B ===
In:

No.	Pos.	Nation	Player

Out:

No.	Pos.	Nation	Player
—	MF	GRE	Tilemachos Karabas (Loan return to Levadiakos)
—	MF	GRE	Christos Albanis (Loan return to Levadiakos)
—	FW	GRE	Theodoros Tsirigotis (Loan return to Levadiakos)

=== PAOK B ===
In:

No.	Pos.	Nation	Player

Out:

No.	Pos.	Nation	Player
—	MF	GRE	Stathis Tachatos (to Volos)
