= 2021–22 PAS Giannina F.C. season =

PAS Giannina
2021–22 season
- Chairman: Giorgos Christovasilis
- Manager: Iraklis Metaxas
- Stadium: Zosimades Stadium, Ioannina
- Super League: 6th
- Greek Cup: Fifth round eliminated by AEL
- Top goalscorer: League: Juan José Perea (10 goals); All: Juan José Perea (10 goals)
Home colours	Away colours	Third colours

The 2021–22 season is PAS Giannina F.C.'s 26th competitive season in the top flight of Greek football, 11th season in the Super League Greece, and 56th year in existence as a football club. They also compete in the Greek Cup.

== Players ==
updated 21 January 2022

No.	Name	Nationality	Position(s)	Place of birth	Date of birth	Signed from	Notes
Goalkeepers
1	Yuri Lodygin	(Russia) (Greece)	GK	Vladimir, Russian SFSR, Soviet Union	26 May 1990	Free	
64	Vasilis Soulis	(Greece)	GK	Patras, Greece	7 December 1994	(Greece) Panachaiki	
99	Vasilis Athanasiou	(Greece)	GK	Aigio, Greece	24 July 1999	(Italy) Mantova	
Defenders
2	Manolis Saliakas	(Greece)	RB	Heraklion, Greece	12 September 1996	(Greece) PAS Lamia	
4	Epaminondas Pantelakis	(Greece)	CB	Chania, Crete, Greece	10 February 1995	(Greece) Panathinaikos	
6	Giannis Kargas (Vice Captain)	(Greece)	CB	Kilkis, Greece	9 December 1994	(Bulgaria) Levski Sofia	
12	Louis Poznański	(Germany) (Poland)	LB	Bremen, Germany	24 May 2001	(Germany) Werder Bremen II	
15	Rodrigo Erramuspe	(Argentina)	CB	Mar del Plata, Argentina	3 May 1990	(Argentina) Belgrano	
24	Antonis Oikonomopoulos	(Greece)	RB	Athens, Greece	9 May 1998	(Greece) Apollon Smyrnis	
33	Dimitris Karagiannis	(Greece)	CB	Mandra, Attica, Greece	27 February 2001	(Greece) Panathinaikos	
43	Marvin Peersman	(Belgium)	LB	Wilrijk, Belgium	10 February 1991	(Israel) Hapoel Tel Aviv	
77	Giannis Rizos	(Greece)	LB	Ioannina, Greece	19 May 2002	(Greece) PAS Giannina U-19	
Midfielders
5	Zisis Karachalios	(Greece)	DM / CM	Karditsa, Greece	10 January 1996	(Greece) Levadiakos	
8	Fabricio Brener	(Argentina)	MF	San Vicente, Argentina	26 May 1998	(Argentina) Belgrano	Loan
10	Juan Dominguez	(Spain)	MF	Pontedeume, Spain	8 January 1990	(Austria) Sturm Graz	
18	Ahmad Mendes Moreira	(Guinea) (Netherlands)	W / FW	Schiedam, Netherlands	27 June 1995	(Netherlands) Excelsior	
19	Alexandros Lolis	(Greece)	MF	Ladochori Thesprotias, Greece	5 September 2002	(Greece) PAS Giannina U-17	
22	Stefanos Siontis (Captain)	(Greece)	CM	Ioannina, Greece	4 September 1987	(Greece) Kassiopi	
27	Caleb Stanko	(United States) (Poland)	DM	Holly, Michigan, United States	26 July 1993	(United States) FC Cincinnati	
29	Michael Gardawski	(Germany) (Poland)	LB / RB / RM	Köln, Germany	25 September 1990	(Poland) Cracovia	
70	Iason Kyrkos	(Greece)	AM / FW	Ioannina, Greece	21 March 2003	(Greece) PAS Giannina U-19	
80	Angelos Liasos	(Greece)	CM	Florina, Greece	26 May 2000	(Greece) PAS Giannina U-20	
Forwards
9	Pedro Conde	(Spain)	FW	Villafranca, Spain	26 July 1988	(United Arab Emirates) Al Dhafra	
11	Juan José Perea	(Colombia)	FW / W	Bogotá, Colombia	23 February 2000	(Greece) Volos	
17	Jan-Marc Schneider	(Germany)	FW / W	Hamburg, Germany	25 March 1994	(Germany) Jahn Regensburg	
28	Leonid Mina	(Greece)	FW		28 March 2004	(Greece) PAS Giannina U-19	
Left during Winter Transfer Window
21	Nicolae Milinceanu	(Moldova)	FW	Chișinău, Moldova	1 August 1992	(Liechtenstein) FC Vaduz	
7	Panagiotis Triadis	(Greece) (Germany)	LW/FW	Herdecke, Germany	9 September 1992	Free	
20	Alexis Triadis	(Greece) (Germany)	MF	Herdecke, Germany	16 May 1997	Free	

=== International players ===
- Yuri Lodygin (Russia men's, Greece U-21)
- (Guinea) Ahmad Mendes Moreira (men's)
- (Moldova) Nicolae Milinceanu (men's, U-21)
- (United States) Caleb Stanko (men's, U-20)
- (Greece) Manolis Saliakas (U-21/19/18/17)
- (Greece) Alexandros Lolis (U-21)
- (Greece) Zisis Karachalios (U-21/19)
- (Greece) Angelos Liasos (U-21)
- Panagiotis Triadis (Greece U-21, Germany U-17/16/15)
- (Greece) Stefanos Siontis (U-19)
- (Belgium) Marvin Peersman (U-19)
- (Greece) Vasilis Athanasiou (U-19)
- (Greece) Epaminondas Pantelakis (U-19)
- (Greece) Dimitris Karagiannis (U-18/17/16)
- (Germany) Louis Poznański (U-18)
- (Greece) Antonis Oikonomopoulos (U-17)
- (Germany) Michael Gardawski (U-16)
- (Germany) Jan-Marc Schneider (U-15)

=== Foreign players ===
EU Nationals
- (Belgium) (Europe) Marvin Peersman
- (Spain) (Europe) Juan Dominguez
- (Germany) (Europe) Jan-Marc Schneider
- (Germany) (Europe) Michael Gardawski
- (Spain) (Europe) Pedro Conde

EU Nationals (Dual Citizenship)
- (Russia) (Greece) (Europe) Yuri Lodygin
- (Germany) (Greece) (Europe) Panagiotis Triadis
- (Germany) (Greece) (Europe) Alexis Triadis
- (Guinea) (Netherlands) (Europe) Ahmad Mendes Moreira
- (United States) (Poland) (Europe) Caleb Stanko
- (Germany) (Poland) (Europe) Louis Poznański

Non-EU Nationals
- (Argentina) Rodrigo Erramuspe
- (Argentina) Fabricio Brener
- (Moldova) Nicolae Milinceanu
- (Colombia) Juan José Perea

== Personnel ==
=== Management ===
Position	Staff
Majority Owner	Giorgos Christovasilis
President and CEO	Giorgos Christovasilis
Director of Football	
Director of Office	
Head of Ticket Department	Andreas Potsis
Press & Media Office	Babis Karvelis
Marketing Office	Kostas Pediaditakis

=== Coaching staff ===
Position	Name
Head Coach	Iraklis Metaxas
Assistant Coach	Athanasios Staikos
Fitness Coach	Ioannis Dourountos (Until 5 October 2021) Thomas Giannitopoulos (From 11 October 2021)
Goalkeepers Coach	Slobodan Šuica
Analyst	Nikolaos Gortzis

=== Medical staff ===
Position	Name
Head doctor	Stavros Restanis
Physio	Filippos Skordos

=== Academy ===
Position	Name
Director of Youth Development	Giorgos Ioannou
Technical Director	Thanasis Staikos
Head Coach U-19	Christos Agelis
Head Coach U-17	Michalis Bolos (Until 21 September 2021) Giannis Lolis (From 21 September 2021)
Head Coach U-15	-
Fitness Coach	Giannis Lolis
Goalkeepers Coach	Nikos Gortzis
Scout	Dimitris Stoukas

== Transfers ==
=== Summer ===
==== In ====
No	Pos	Player	Transferred from	Fee	Date	Source
7	LW/FW	Panagiotis Triadis	-	Free	13 June 2021	
5	DM / CM	Zisis Karachalios	Levadiakos	Free	1 July 2021	
33	CB	Dimitris Karagiannis	Panathinaikos	Free	1 July 2021	
64	GK	Vasilis Soulis	Panachaiki	Free	10 July 2021	
17	FW / W	Jan-Marc Schneider	Jahn Regensburg	Free	10 July 2021	
11	FW / W	Juan José Perea	Panathinaikos	Undisclosed	19 July 2021	
29	LB / RB / RM	Michael Gardawski	Cracovia	Free	30 July 2021	
18	W / FW	Ahmad Mendes Moreira	Excelsior	Free	6 August 2021	
9	FW	Pedro Conde	Al Dhafra	Free	9 August 2021	
28	FW	Leonid Mina	PAS Giannina U-19	Promotion	17 August 2021	
70	MF	Iason Kyrkos	PAS Giannina U-19	Promotion	17 August 2021	
77	LB	Giannis Rizos	PAS Giannina U-19	Promotion	17 August 2021	

==== Out ====
No	Pos	Player	Transferred to	Fee	Date	Source
9	RLW	Christos Eleftheriadis	PAS Lamia	End of contract	9 June 2021	
7	MF	Alexandros Kartalis	Atromitos	End of contract	14 June 2021	
12	FW	Sandi Križman	SCR Altach	End of contract	2 July 2021	
33	GK	Lefteris Choutesiotis	Ionikos Nikaia	End of contract	5 July 2021	
14	FW	Georgios Pamlidis	Apollon Smyrnis	End of contract	5 July 2021	
21	MF	Fabry Castro	Apollon Smyrnis		12 July 2021	
28	MF	Giorgos Xydas	Olympiacos Volos	End of contract	8 August 2021	
25	CB	Pantelis Panourgias	Doxa Drama	End of contract	17 August 2021	
23	LB	Stavros Pilios	Iraklis Thessaloniki	Loan	24 August 2021	
47	MF	Pavlos Grosdanis		Released	31 August 2021	
11	FW	Giorgos Doumtsis	Kallithea	Released	31 August 2021	
17	MF	Vladyslav Naumets		Released		

=== Winter ===
==== In ====
No	Pos	Player	Transferred from	Fee	Date	Source
27	DM	Caleb Stanko	(United States) FC Cincinnati	Free	5 January 2022	
12	LB	Louis Poznański	(Germany) Werder Bremen II	Free	21 January 2022	

==== Out ====
No	Pos	Player	Transferred to	Fee	Date	Source
21	FW	Nicolae Milinceanu	AEL Limassol	Undisclosed	12 January 2022	
7	LW/FW	Panagiotis Triadis	Free	Released	March 2022	
20	MF	Alexis Triadis	Free	Released	March 2022	

== Pre-season and friendlies ==
Win Draw Loss Upcoming fixture

4 August 2021 Friendly	Lamia	2-0	PAS Giannina	Lamia
20:00	Romanić 51' (pen.); Vlachomitros 90+2'	Report		Stadium: Lamia Municipal Stadium; Attendance: unknown Referee: Nikos Papakonstantinou

8 August 2021 Friendly	Panetolikos	0–0	PAS Giannina	Agrinio
19:30	Vrgoč (yellow card) 85'	Report	Perea (yellow card) 85'	Stadium: Emileon; Attendance: unknown Referee: Konstantinos Tsoplakos

14 August 2021 Friendly	Asteras Tripolis	1-0	PAS Giannina	Tripoli
19:30	Valiente 36'	Report	Siontis (yellow card) 19'	Stadium: Theodoros Kolokotronis; Attendance: unknown Referee: Aristotelis Diamantopoulos

21 August 2021 Friendly	Aris Thessaloniki	4–1	PAS Giannina	Thessaloniki
19:30	Kamara 38'; Lumor (yellow card) 40'; Fabiano 44'; Sundgren (yellow card) 52'; Mateo García 54'; Iturbe 61'; Benalouane (yellow card) 66'	Report Report	Saliakas 45+1'; Perea (yellow card) 52'; Lodygin (yellow card) 66'; Kargas (red card) 67'	Stadium: Kleanthis Vikelidis Stadium; Attendance: unknown Referee: Konstantinos Tsetsilas

28 August 2021 Friendly	PAS Giannina	2–3	Panetolikos	Ioannina
19:30	Pantelakis 62'; Perea (yellow card) 72'; Lolis 79'	Report	Vrgoč 18'; Díaz 41'; Malis 73'; Duarte (yellow card) 75'	Stadium: Zosimades Stadium; Attendance: 300; Referee: Spyros Zabalas

1 September 2021 Friendly	PAS Giannina	4-1	Thesprotos	Ioannina
18:00	Giorgos Zonios 3', 31'; Conde 41'; Perea 51'	Report	Apostolos Sarantidis 21'	Stadium: PEAKI; Referee: Konstantinos Neos

10 November 2021 Friendly	PAS Giannina	5-0	PAS Acheron Kanallaki	Ioannina
18:00	Pantelakis 37'; Mina 51'; Karagiannis 54'; Moreira 60', 79'	Report		Stadium: PEAKI; Referee: Leonidas Tzovas

21 April 2022 Friendly	PAS Giannina	1-1	Thesprotos	Ioannina
	Moreira 33' (pen.)	Report	Spyros Georgousis 23'	Stadium: Zosimades Stadium; Referee: Konstantinos Neos

== Competitions ==
=== League table ===
Pos	Team	Pld	W	D	L	GF	GA	GD	Pts	Qualification
4	Aris	26	13	6	7	28	21	+7	45	Qualification for the Play-off round
5	Panathinaikos	26	13	3	10	41	21	+20	42	Qualification for the Play-off round
6	PAS Giannina	26	11	7	8	28	24	+4	40	Qualification for the Play-off round
7	OFI	26	9	10	7	33	32	+1	37	Qualification for the Play-out round
8	Asteras Tripolis	26	10	5	11	27	29	−2	35	Qualification for the Play-out round

Source: Super League Greece
Rules for classification: 1) Points; 2) Head-to-head points; 3) Head-to-head goal difference; 4) Goal difference; 5) Goals scored; 6) Play-offs (neutral ground).
(Note: Criteria 6 is only used if needed to decide champion, teams for relegation or teams for UEFA competitions).

==== Results summary ====
Overall								Home						Away					
Pld	W	D	L	GF	GA	GD	Pts	W	D	L	GF	GA	GD	W	D	L	GF	GA	GD
26	11	7	8	28	24	+4	40	7	3	3	18	13	+5	4	4	5	10	11	−1

=== Fixtures ===
Win Draw Loss Upcoming fixture

12 September 2021 1	PAOK	0–1	PAS Giannina	Thessaloniki
19:00	Vieirinha (yellow card) 64'; Schwab (yellow card) 81'	Report	Erramuspe (yellow card) 33'; Peersman (yellow card) 45+1'; Conde 86'; Lodygin (yellow card) 90+5'	Stadium: Toumba; Attendance: 8024; Referee: Aristotelis Diamantopoulos

18 September 2021 2	PAS Giannina	1–0	Panathinaikos	Ioannina
20:30	Gardawski 5'; Conde (yellow card) 37'; Lodygin (yellow card) 61'; Gardawski (yellow card) 80'; Saliakas (yellow card) 84'	Report	Šarlija (yellow card) 22'; Carlitos (yellow card) 61'	Stadium: Zosimades Stadium; Attendance: 2726; Referee: Ioannis Papadopoulos

23 September 2021 3	Ionikos	0–0	PAS Giannina	Nikaia
18:15		Report	Erramuspe (yellow card) 4'; Karachalios (yellow card) 72'	Stadium: Neapoli; Attendance: 999; Referee: Emanouil Skoulas

27 September 2021 4	PAS Giannina	1–1	OFI	Ioannina
17:15	Milinceanu 22'	Report	Neira 12' (pen.); Balogiannis (yellow card) 42'; Pasalidis (yellow card) 48'; Gallegos (yellow card) 51'	Stadium: Zosimades Stadium; Attendance: 1360; Referee: Angelos Angelakis

3 October 2021 5	Atromitos	1–1	PAS Giannina	Peristeri, Athens
16:00	Klonaridis 6'	Report	Kargas (yellow card) 14'; Saliakas (yellow card) 79'; Brener (yellow card) 83'; Moreira 90+1'	Stadium: Peristeri Stadium; Attendance: 745; Referee: Georgios Tzovaras

17 October 2021 6	PAS Giannina	1–2	Olympiacos	Ioannina
20:30	Gardawski (yellow card) 20'; Erramuspe 61' (pen.); Schneider (yellow card) 68'; Perea (yellow card) 75'	Report	A. Camara 17'; Papastathopoulos (yellow card) 43'; A. Camara (yellow card) 59'; Reabciuk (yellow card) 71'; El-Arabi 84'; M. Camara (yellow card) 90+5'	Stadium: Zosimades Stadium; Attendance: 2650; Referee: Angelos Evangelou

23 October 2021 7	Apollon Smyrnis	1–0	PAS Giannina	Athens
19:00	Fatjon (yellow card) 17'; Fabry (yellow card) 26'; Bruno Alves (yellow card) 38'; Ioannidis 48'; Lisgaras (yellow card) 52'	Report	Gardawski (yellow card) 27'; Perea (yellow card) 32'; Domínguez (yellow card) 86'	Stadium: Georgios Kamaras Stadium; Attendance: 561; Referee: Evangelos Manouhos

31 October 2021 8	PAS Giannina	1–1	Asteras Tripolis	Ioannina
19:30	Brener 37'; Karachalios (yellow card) 69'	Report	Munafo (yellow card) 23'; Santafé (yellow card) 31'; Sito 34'; Rubén García (yellow card) 38'; Barrales (red card) 82'; Tsiftsis (yellow card) 90+5'	Stadium: Zosimades Stadium; Attendance: 1566; Referee: Andreas Gamaris

6 November 2021 9	PAS Giannina	3–0	Panetolikos	Ioannina
17:15	Erramuspe 33' (pen.); Perea 37'; Kargas 58'; Perea (yellow card) 66'	Report	Malis (yellow card) 32'	Stadium: Zosimades Stadium; Attendance: 1114; Referee: Athanassios Tzilos

20 November 2021 10	Aris Thessaloniki	0–5	PAS Giannina	Thessaloniki
19:30	Kamara (yellow card) 63'; Mancini (yellow card) 83'	Report	Schneider 5'; Erramuspe (yellow card) 23'; Milinceanu 35'; Domínguez (yellow card) 51'; Perea 54'; Kargas (yellow card) 68'; Erramuspe 71' (pen.); Moreira 85'	Stadium: Kleanthis Vikelidis Stadium; Attendance: 9061; Referee: Roi Reinshreiber

27 November 2021 11	PAS Giannina	1–2	AEK Athens	Ioannina
19:30	Erramuspe 5' (pen.); Karachalios (yellow card) 10'; Brener (yellow card) 52'; Perea (yellow card) 88'	Report	Amrabat 9'; Vranješ (yellow card) 33'; Szymański (yellow card) 50'; Shakhov 90'	Stadium: Zosimades Stadium; Attendance: 2439; Referee: Dimitrios Karantonis

6 December 2021 12	Lamia	0-1	PAS Giannina	Volos
19:30	Tzanetopoulos (yellow card) 38'; Saramantas (yellow card) 84'	Report	Saliakas 54'; Karachalios (yellow card) 69'	Stadium: Panthessaliko Stadium; Attendance: 78; Referee: Anastasios Papapetrou

11 December 2021 13	PAS Giannina	3-2	Volos	Ioannina
17:15	Kargas 12'; Perea 57'; Domínguez (yellow card) 84'; Erramuspe 86' (pen.)	Report	Oroz 1'; Ninis 40'; Grillo (yellow card) 70'; Klaiman (yellow card) 85'	Stadium: Zosimades Stadium; Attendance: 1405; Referee: Angelos Evangelou

15 December 2021 14	PAS Giannina	0-4	PAOK	Ioannina
17:15	Lolis (yellow card) 72'; Erramuspe (yellow card) 83'	Report	Kurtić 31' (pen.), 63'; Murg (yellow card) 59'; Douglas Augusto 68'; Akpom 89'	Stadium: Zosimades Stadium; Attendance: 1684; Referee: Vassilios Fotias

19 December 2021 15	Panathinaikos	2–0	PAS Giannina	Athens
19:30	Maurício 54'; Sánchez 69'	Report	Saliakas (yellow card) 6'; Perea (yellow card) 36'; Gardawski (yellow card) 53'	Stadium: Leoforos Stadium; Attendance: 5119; Referee: Athanassios Tzilos

4 January 2022 16	PAS Giannina	1-0	Ionikos	Ioannina
17:15	Perea 51'; Liasos (yellow card) 70'	Report	Aosman (yellow card) 17'; Romao (yellow card) 90'	Stadium: Zosimades Stadium; Attendance: 452; Referee: Angelos Angelakis

8 January 2022 17	OFI	1–1	PAS Giannina	Heraklion, Crete
17:15	Neira (yellow card) 28'; Balogiannis (yellow card) 31'; Erramuspe 90+3' (o.g.)	Report	Perea 54'; Moreira (yellow card) 84'; Soulis (yellow card) 90+2'	Stadium: Theodoros Vardinogiannis; Attendance: 570; Referee: Athanasios Tzilos

16 January 2022 18	PAS Giannina	1-1	Atromitos	Ioannina
19:30	Perea 3'; Kargas (yellow card) 64'	Report	Koulouris 1'; Galvão (yellow card) 47'; Salomon (yellow card) 61'	Stadium: Zosimades Stadium; Attendance: 606; Referee: Evangelos Manouhos

23 January 2022 19	Olympiacos	2-0	PAS Giannina	Piraeus
19:30	Masouras 4'; Tiquinho 88'	Report	Brener (yellow card) 36'; Karachalios (yellow card) 63'	Stadium: Karaiskakis Stadium; Attendance: 0 (closed doors); Referee: Konstantinos Perakis

30 January 2022 20	PAS Giannina	2–0	Apollon Smyrnis	Ioannina
15:00	Peersman 26'; Kargas (yellow card) 40'; Erramuspe (yellow card) 59'; Domínguez (yellow card) 67'; Erramuspe 79' (pen.); Lolis (yellow card) 90'	Report	Andoni (yellow card) 40'; Ioannidis (yellow card) 56'; Fabry (yellow card) 57'	Stadium: Zosimades Stadium; Attendance: 384; Referee: Angelos Evangelou

2 February 2022 21	Asteras Tripolis	2-0	PAS Giannina	Tripoli
15:00	Riera 3', 35'; Valiente (yellow card) 52'; Iglesias (yellow card) 78'	Report	Stanko (yellow card) 44'	Stadium: Theodoros Kolokotronis; Attendance: 486; Referee: Angelos Angelakis

5 February 2022 22	Panetolikos	0-1	PAS Giannina	Agrinio
19:30	Malis (yellow card) 45+1'; Lluy (yellow card) 68'	Report	Karachalios (yellow card) 49'; Schneider 63'; Peersman (yellow card) 87'	Stadium: Panetolikos Stadium; Attendance: 631; Referee: Ioannis Papadopoulos

14 February 2022 23	PAS Giannina	2-0	Aris Thessaloniki	Ioannina
19:30	Siampanis 51' (o.g.); Schneider (yellow card) 57'; Stanko (yellow card) 72'; Domínguez 84'; Poznański (yellow card) 90+4'	Report	García (yellow card) 90+6'	Stadium: Zosimades Stadium; Attendance: 591; Referee: Anastasios Papapetrou

20 February 2022 24	AEK Athens	2-0	PAS Giannina	Marousi
19:30	Mantalos 69'; Hajsafi (yellow card) 72'; Ansarifard 88'	Report	Erramuspe (yellow card) 77'	Stadium: Olympic Stadium; Attendance: 5202; Referee: Ioannis Papadopoulos

28 February 2022 25	PAS Giannina	1–0	Lamia	Ioannina
19:30	Kargas (yellow card) 39'; Peersman 44'; Perea (yellow card) 48'	Report	Gentsoglou (yellow card) 38'	Stadium: Zosimades Stadium; Attendance: 1242; Referee: Evangelos Manouhos

6 March 2022 26	Volos	0–0	PAS Giannina	Volos
19:00	Tsokanis (yellow card) 39'; Barrientos (yellow card) 55'; Rhyner (yellow card) 71'; Ninis (yellow card) 90+5'	Report	Saliakas (yellow card) 80'; Gardawski (yellow card) 90+1'	Stadium: Panthessaliko Stadium; Attendance: 519; Referee: Alexandros Tsamouris

=== Play-off round ===
The top six teams from Regular season will meet twice (10 matches per team) for places in 2022–23 UEFA Champions League and 2022–23 UEFA Europa Conference League as well as deciding the league champion.

Pos	Team	Pld	W	D	L	GF	GA	GD	Pts	Qualification
1	Olympiacos (C)	36	25	8	3	62	26	+36	83	Qualification for the Champions League second qualifying round
2	PAOK	36	19	7	10	58	33	+25	64	Qualification for the Europa Conference League second qualifying round
3	Aris	36	18	8	10	39	28	+11	62	Qualification for the Europa Conference League second qualifying round
4	Panathinaikos	36	18	7	11	52	26	+26	61	Qualification for the Europa Conference League third qualifying round (Note: Panathinaikos qualified for the Europa Conference League third qualifying round by winning the Greek Cup.)
5	AEK Athens	36	16	8	12	56	42	+14	56	
6	PAS Giannina	36	12	10	14	34	42	−8	46	

Source: Super League Greece
Rules for classification: 1) Points; 2) Head-to-head points (Regular season and play-off); 3) Head-to-head goal difference (Regular season and play-off); 4) Regular season position.
(C) Champions

=== Results summary ===
Overall								Home						Away					
Pld	W	D	L	GF	GA	GD	Pts	W	D	L	GF	GA	GD	W	D	L	GF	GA	GD
36	12	10	14	34	42	−8	46	8	5	5	22	20	+2	4	5	9	12	22	−10

=== Fixtures ===
Win Draw Loss Upcoming fixture

13 March 2022 1	PAOK	1–0	PAS Giannina	Thessaloniki
21:30	Murg (yellow card) 19'; Soares (yellow card) 43'; Akpom 90+1'; Crespo (yellow card) 90+4'	Report	Gardawski (yellow card) 33'	Stadium: Toumba; Attendance: 3366; Referee: Aristotelis Diamantopoulos

20 March 2022 2	PAS Giannina	1–1	Olympiacos	Ioannina
15:30	Kargas (yellow card) 58'; Stanko (yellow card) 61'; Perea 70'	Report	El-Arabi 45+1'; Lala (yellow card) 56'	Stadium: Zosimades Stadium; Attendance: 1863; Referee: Aristomenis Koutsiaftis

3 April 2022 3	Aris Thessaloniki	0–0	PAS Giannina	Thessaloniki
17:00	Benalouane (yellow card) 53'; Mancini (yellow card) 57'	Report	Karachalios (yellow card) 12'; Domínguez (yellow card) 66'; Lodygin (yellow card) 75'	Stadium: Kleanthis Vikelidis Stadium; Attendance: 5361; Referee: Anastasios Papapetrou

10 April 2022 4	PAS Giannina	0–0	Panathinaikos	Ioannina
19:00	Perea (yellow card) 54'; Kargas (yellow card) 81'; Erramuspe (yellow card) 90'	Report	Gaćinović (yellow card) 68'; Juankar (red card) 80'; Aitor (yellow card) 82'	Stadium: Zosimades Stadium; Attendance: 2350; Referee: István Vad

18 April 2022 5	PAS Giannina	2–3	AEK Athens	Ioannina
18:00	Perea 52', 90'; Gardawski (yellow card) 54'; Saliakas (yellow card) 76'	Report	Krychowiak 4'; Rota 45+2'; Araujo 69'; Mantalos (yellow card) 72'; Shakhov (yellow card) 90+2'	Stadium: Zosimades Stadium; Attendance: 2032; Referee: Evangelos Manouhos

1 May 2022 6	Olympiacos	3-2	PAS Giannina	Piraeus
17:00	El-Arabi 6'; Rodrigues 43'; Bouchalakis (yellow card) 45+1'; Papastathopoulos (yellow card) 90+7'; Lopes 90+8'; Lopes (yellow card) 90+9'	Report	Saliakas (yellow card) 41'; Peersman (yellow card) 44'; Stanko (yellow card) 45+1'; Perea 45+3'; Schneider 80'; Ikonomopoulos (yellow card) 86'	Stadium: Karaiskakis Stadium; Attendance: 13532; Referee: Dimitrios Karantonis

8 May 2022 7	PAS Giannina	1-0	PAOK	Ioannina
18:00	Schneider 77'	Report	Schwab (yellow card) 90'	Stadium: Zosimades Stadium; Attendance: 1452; Referee: Anastasios Sidiropoulos

11 May 2022 8	AEK Athens	3-0	PAS Giannina	Marousi
19:30	Hajsafi 39'; Amrabat 45+5' (pen.); Krychowiak 59'; Mantalos (yellow card) 69'	Report	Siontis (yellow card) 88'	Stadium: Olympic Stadium; Attendance: 4271; Referee: Aristotelis Diamantopoulos

14 May 2022 9	Panathinaikos	4–0	PAS Giannina	Athens
20:00	Villafáñez 37'; Maurício 68'; Carlitos 71'; Juankar (yellow card) 85'; Juankar 87'	Report	Lolis (yellow card) 28'; Saliakas (yellow card) 59'; Schneider (yellow card) 66'; Kargas (yellow card) 86'	Stadium: Leoforos Stadium; Attendance: 12079; Referee: Evangelos Manouhos

17 May 2022 10	PAS Giannina	0-3	Aris Thessaloniki	Ioannina
20:00		Report	Fabiano 8'; Kamara 22'; M'Bakata 81'	Stadium: Zosimades Stadium; Referee: Anastasios Papapetrou

=== Greek Cup ===
==== Fifth round ====
26 October 2021	Larissa	1–1 (a.e.t.) (3–1 p)	PAS Giannina	Larissa
17:15	Mavrias 52' (pen.); Iliadis (yellow card) 60'; Colombino (yellow card) 90+1'	Report	Gardawski (red card) 50'; Kargas 62' (pen.)	Stadium: Alcazar Stadium; Referee: Anastasios Papapetrou
	Penalties
	Acuña (penalty scored); Iliadis (penalty scored); Bertos (penalty missed); Colombino (penalty scored)		(penalty missed) Saliakas; (penalty missed) Kargas; (penalty scored) Peersman; (penalty missed) Pantelakis

== Statistics ==
=== Appearances ===
No.	Pos.	Nat.	Name	Greek Super League	Greek Cup	Total
No.	Pos.	Nat.	Name	Apps	Apps	Apps
1	GK	(Russia) (Greece)	Yuri Lodygin	32	1	33
2	RB	(Greece)	Manolis Saliakas	35	1	36
4	CB	(Greece)	Epaminondas Pantelakis	21	1	22
5	DM / CM	(Greece)	Zisis Karachalios	31	1	32
6	CB	(Greece)	Giannis Kargas	35	1	36
7	LW/FW	(Greece) (Germany)	Panagiotis Triadis	8	1	9
8	MF	(Argentina)	Fabricio Brener	22	0	22
9	FW	(Spain)	Pedro Conde	5	0	5
10	MF	(Spain)	Juan Dominguez	29	0	29
11	FW / W	(Colombia)	Juan José Perea	32	1	33
12	LB	(Germany) (Poland)	Louis Poznański	6	0	6
15	CB	(Argentina)	Rodrigo Erramuspe	33	0	33
17	FW / W	(Germany)	Jan-Marc Schneider	31	1	32
18	W / FW	(Guinea) (Netherlands)	Ahmad Mendes Moreira	26	1	27
19	MF	(Greece)	Alexandros Lolis	20	0	20
20	MF	(Greece)	Alexis Triadis	0	0	0
21	FW	(Moldova)	Nicolae Milinceanu	14	1	15
22	CM	(Greece)	Stefanos Siontis	6	1	7
24	RB	(Greece)	Antonis Oikonomopoulos	14	0	14
27	DM	(United States) (Poland)	Caleb Stanko	20	0	20
28	FW	(Greece)	Leonid Mina	13	1	14
29	LB / RB / RM	(Germany)	Michael Gardawski	21	1	22
33	CB	(Greece)	Dimitris Karagiannis	0	0	0
43	LB	(Belgium)	Marvin Peersman	26	1	27
64	GK	(Greece)	Vasilios Soulis	4	0	0
70	AM / FW	(Greece)	Iason Kyrkos	4	0	4
77	LB	(Greece)	Giannis Rizos	3	1	4
80	CM	(Greece)	Angelos Liasos	26	1	27
99	GK	(Greece)	Vasilis Athanasiou	0	0	0

Super League Greece

=== Goalscorers ===
No.	Pos.	Nat.	Name	Greek Super League	Greek Cup	Total
No.	Pos.	Nat.	Name	Goals	Goals	Goals
11	FW / W	(Colombia)	Juan José Perea	10	0	10
15	CB	(Argentina)	Rodrigo Erramuspe	6	0	6
17	FW / W	(Germany)	Jan-Marc Schneider	4	0	4
6	CB	(Greece)	Giannis Kargas	2	1	3
18	W / FW	(Guinea) (Netherlands)	Ahmad Mendes Moreira	2	0	2
21	FW	(Moldova)	Nicolae Milinceanu	2	0	2
43	LB	(Belgium)	Marvin Peersman	2	0	2
2	RB	(Greece)	Manolis Saliakas	1	0	1
29	LB / RB / RM	(Germany)	Michael Gardawski	1	0	1
8	MF	(Argentina)	Fabricio Brener	1	0	1
9	FW	(Spain)	Pedro Conde	1	0	1
10	MF	(Spain)	Juan Dominguez	1	0	1
			Own goals	1	0	1

Super League Greece

=== Clean sheets ===
No.	Pos.	Nat.	Name	Greek Super League	Greek Cup	Total
No.	Pos.	Nat.	Name	CS	CS	CS
1	GK	(Russia) (Greece)	Yuri Lodygin	14 (32)	0 (1)	14 (33)
64	GK	(Greece)	Vasilios Soulis	1 (4)	0 (0)	1 (4)
99	GK	(Greece)	Vasilis Athanasiou	0 (0)	0 (0)	0 (0)

=== Disciplinary record ===
S	P	N	Name	Super League			Play off			Greek Cup			Total		
S	P	N	Name	Yellow card	Yellow-red card	Red card	Yellow card	Yellow-red card	Red card	Yellow card	Yellow-red card	Red card	Yellow card	Yellow-red card	Red card
1	GK	(Russia) (Greece)	Yuri Lodygin	2	0	0	1	0	0	0	0	0	3	0	0
2	RB	(Greece)	Manolis Saliakas	4	0	0	3	0	0	0	0	0	7	0	0
5	DM / CM	(Greece)	Zisis Karachalios	6	0	0	1	0	0	0	0	0	7	0	0
6	CB	(Greece)	Giannis Kargas	5	0	0	3	0	0	0	0	0	8	0	0
8	MF	(Argentina)	Fabricio Brener	3	0	0	0	0	0	0	0	0	3	0	0
9	FW	(Spain)	Pedro Conde	1	0	0	0	0	0	0	0	0	1	0	0
10	MF	(Spain)	Juan Dominguez	4	0	0	1	0	0	0	0	0	5	0	0
11	FW / W	(Colombia)	Juan José Perea	6	0	0	1	0	0	0	0	0	7	0	0
12	LB	(Germany) (Poland)	Louis Poznański	1	0	0	0	0	0	0	0	0	1	0	0
15	CB	(Argentina)	Rodrigo Erramuspe	6	0	0	1	0	0	0	0	0	7	0	0
17	FW / W	(Germany)	Jan-Marc Schneider	2	0	0	1	0	0	0	0	0	3	0	0
18	W / FW	(Guinea) (Netherlands)	Ahmad Mendes Moreira	1	0	0	0	0	0	0	0	0	1	0	0
19	MF	(Greece)	Alexandros Lolis	2	0	0	1	0	0	0	0	0	3	0	0
22	CM	(Greece)	Stefanos Siontis	0	0	0	1	0	0	0	0	0	1	0	0
24	RB	(Greece)	Antonis Oikonomopoulos	0	0	0	1	0	0	0	0	0	1	0	0
27	DM	(United States) (Poland)	Caleb Stanko	2	0	0	2	0	0	0	0	0	4	0	0
29	LB / RB / RM	(Germany)	Michael Gardawski	5	0	0	2	0	0	0	0	1	7	0	1
43	LB	(Belgium)	Marvin Peersman	2	0	0	1	0	0	0	0	0	3	0	0
64	GK	(Greece)	Vasilios Soulis	1	0	0	0	0	0	0	0	0	1	0	0
80	CM	(Greece)	Angelos Liasos	1	0	0	0	0	0	0	0	0	1	0	0

=== Best goal award ===
MD	Best goal award
10	Juan José Perea

=== Other awards ===
- Super League Fantasy League Player of the Season
  - Yuri Lodygin: 2021–22
- Super League Fantasy League Goalkeeper of the Season
  - Yuri Lodygin: 2021–22
- Super League Fantasy League Defender of the Season
  - Rodrigo Erramuspe: 2021–22
- Super League most ball steals
  - Zisis Karachalios: 2021–22
  - Manolis Saliakas ranked 5th
- Super League most successful crosses
  - Manolis Saliakas: 2021–22
- Super League most clean sheets
  - Yuri Lodygin: 2021–22
- Super League Team of the Year
  - Yuri Lodygin
  - Giannis Kargas
  - Manolis Saliakas
- Super League Manager of the Year
  - Iraklis Metaxas (3rd)
