= List of Greek football transfers summer 2021 =

This is a list of Greek football transfers summer 2021. Only clubs in 2021–22 Super League Greece are included.

== Greek Super League ==
=== AEK Athens ===
In:

No.	Pos.	Nation	Player

Out:

No.	Pos.	Nation	Player

=== Apollon Smyrnis ===
In:

No.	Pos.	Nation	Player
—	MF	COL	Fabry Castro (from PAS Giannina)
—	FW	GRE	Georgios Pamlidis (from PAS Giannina)

Out:

No.	Pos.	Nation	Player

=== Aris ===
In:

No.	Pos.	Nation	Player

Out:

No.	Pos.	Nation	Player

=== Asteras Tripolis ===
In:

No.	Pos.	Nation	Player

Out:

No.	Pos.	Nation	Player

=== Atromitos ===
In:

No.	Pos.	Nation	Player

Out:

No.	Pos.	Nation	Player

=== Ionikos ===
In:

No.	Pos.	Nation	Player

Out:

No.	Pos.	Nation	Player

=== Lamia ===
In:

No.	Pos.	Nation	Player
—	FW	GRE	Christos Eleftheriadis (from PAS Giannina)

Out:

No.	Pos.	Nation	Player

=== OFI ===
In:

No.	Pos.	Nation	Player

Out:

No.	Pos.	Nation	Player

=== Panathinaikos ===
In:

No.	Pos.	Nation	Player

Out:

No.	Pos.	Nation	Player

=== Olympiacos ===
In:

No.	Pos.	Nation	Player

Out:

No.	Pos.	Nation	Player

=== Panathinaikos ===
In:

No.	Pos.	Nation	Player

Out:

No.	Pos.	Nation	Player
—	DF	GRE	Dimitris Karagiannis (to PAS Giannina)
—	FW	ARG	Juan José Perea (to PAS Giannina)

=== Panetolikos ===
In:

No.	Pos.	Nation	Player

Out:

No.	Pos.	Nation	Player

=== PAOK ===
In:

No.	Pos.	Nation	Player

Out:

No.	Pos.	Nation	Player

=== PAS Giannina ===
In:

No.	Pos.	Nation	Player
—	GK	GRE	Vasilis Soulis (from Panachaiki)
—	MF	GRE	Giannis Rizos (from PAS Giannina U-19)
—	DF	GRE	Michael Gardawski (from (Poland) Cracovia)
—	DF	GRE	Panagiotis Triadis
—	DF	GRE	Zisis Karachalios (from Levadiakos)
—	DF	GRE	Dimitris Karagiannis (from Panathinaikos)
—	MF	GRE	Iasonas Kirkos (from PAS Giannina U-19)
—	FW	GER	Jan-Marc Schneider (from (Germany) Jahn Regensburg)
—	FW	ARG	Juan José Perea (from Panathinaikos)
—	FW	NED	Ahmad Mendes Moreira (from (Netherlands) Excelsior)
—	FW	ESP	Pedro Conde (from (Netherlands) Al Dhafra)

Out:

No.	Pos.	Nation	Player
—	GK	GRE	Lefteris Choutesiotis (to Ionikos Nikaia)
—	MF	UKR	Vladyslav Naumets (Released)
—	MF	COL	Fabry Castro (to Apollon Smyrnis)
—	MF	GRE	Alexandros Kartalis (to Atromitos)
—	MF	GRE	Giorgos Xydas (to Olympiacos Volos)
—	MF	GRE	Pantelis Panourgias (to Doxa Drama)
—	MF	GRE	Stavros Pilios (to Iraklis Thessaloniki)
—	MF	GRE	Pavlos Grosdanis (Relised)
—	FW	GRE	Christos Eleftheriadis (to PAS Lamia)
—	FW	CRO	Sandi Križman (to (Australia) SCR Altach)
—	FW	GRE	Georgios Pamlidis (to Apollon Smyrnis)
—	FW	GRE	Giorgos Doumtsis (to Kallithea)

=== Volos ===
In:

No.	Pos.	Nation	Player

Out:

No.	Pos.	Nation	Player
