= Alagbe =

Alagbe is a surname. Notable people with the surname include:

- Oluwatobiloba Alagbe (born 2000), Nigerian footballer
- Raji Alagbe Rasaki (born 1947), Nigerian politician and general
