= Oluwatobiloba =

Given name

Olúwatóbilọ́ba
- Gender: Unisex
- Language: Yoruba

Origin
- Origin: Nigerian
- Meaning: The lord is great a king
- Region of origin: South West Nigeria

Oluwatobiloba or Olúwatóbilọ́ba audio is a common unisex name of yoruba origin. It means The lord is great a king. A diminutive form of the name is Olúwatóbi which means The lord is great / big.

== Notable people with the name ==
- Oluwatobiloba Alagbe (born 2000), Nigerian footballer
- Oluwatobiloba Daniel Anidugbe (born 1994), Nigerian singer-songwriter
- Amusan Oluwatobiloba (born 1997), Nigerian sprinter and hurdler
- Tèmítọ́pẹ́ Títílọlá Olúwatóbilọ́ba Fagbenle (born 1992), American-born Nigerian-British basketball player
- Juliana Oluwatobiloba Olayode (born 1995), Nigerian actress and activist
- Oluwatobiloba Oladapo I. A. Olusegun Olubi (born 1987), British sprinter and bobsledder
- Oluwatobiloba Oluwayemi (born 2003), English footballer
