= Christos Albanis =

Christos Albanis may refer to:

- Christos Albanis (footballer, born 1994)
- Christos Albanis (footballer, born 1999)
