= Tilemachos Karampas =

Greek footballer

Personal information
- Date of birth: 5 April 2001 (age 25)
- Place of birth: Schimatari, Boeotia, Greece
- Height: 1.78 m (5 ft 10 in)
- Position: Midfielder

Team information
- Current team: Anagennisi Karditsa
- Number: 23

Youth career
- 2018–2019: Levadiakos

Senior career*
Years	Team	Apps	(Gls)
2019–2022	Levadiakos	0	(0)
2022	→ Panathinaikos B (loan)	9	(0)
2022–2024	Panathinaikos B	46	(1)
2024–2026	Egaleo	36	(0)
2026–	Anagennisi Karditsa	0	(0)
- * Club domestic league appearances and goals as of 4 May 2026

Tilemachos Karampas (Greek: Τηλέμαχος Καραμπάς; born 5 April 2001) is a Greek professional footballer who plays as a midfielder for Super League 2 club Anagennisi Karditsa.
