= Timipere Johnson Eboh =

Nigerian footballer

Personal information
- Date of birth: 19 June 2002 (age 24)
- Place of birth: Nigeria
- Height: 1.82 m (6 ft 0 in)
- Position: Midfielder

Team information
- Current team: A.E. Kifisia
- Number: 14

Youth career
- Asteras Tripolis

Senior career*
Years	Team	Apps	(Gls)
2021–2025	Asteras Tripolis	0	(0)
2021–2022	→ Episkopi (loan)	25	(3)
2022–2023	→ Panathinaikos B (loan)	20	(0)
2023–2024	→ Iraklis (loan)	28	(3)
2024–2025	→ A.E. Kifisia (loan)	23	(0)
2025–	A.E. Kifisia	26	(0)
- * Club domestic league appearances and goals as of 14 June 2026

Timipere Johnson Eboh (born 19 June 2002) is a Nigerian professional footballer who plays as a midfielder for Greek Super League club A.E. Kifisia.
