= Theocharis Iliadis =

Greek footballer

Personal information
- Date of birth: 5 September 1996 (age 30)
- Place of birth: Katerini, Greece
- Height: 1.85 m (6 ft 1 in)
- Position: Centre-back

Team information
- Current team: Panserraikos
- Number: 5

Senior career*
Years	Team	Apps	(Gls)
2014–2017	Achilleas Neokesaria	48	(2)
2017	FSV Budissa Bautzen	9	(0)
2017–2018	Volos	6	(0)
2018	Pierikos	8	(0)
2018–2019	Asteras Itea	24	(0)
2019–2020	Diagoras	14	(0)
2020–2026	AEL	137	(8)
2026–	Panserraikos	3	(0)
- * Club domestic league appearances and goals as of 20 September 2026

Theocharis Iliadis (Greek: Θεοχάρης Ηλιάδης; born 5 September 1996) is a Greek professional footballer who plays as a centre-back for Super League 2 club Panserraikos.
