= Armando Përlleshi =

Albanian footballer

Personal information
- Date of birth: 29 January 2003 (age 23)
- Place of birth: Albania
- Position: Goalkeeper

Team information
- Current team: Jarabacao FC
- Number: 50

Youth career
- –2020: Teuta
- 2023: Olympiacos

Senior career*
Years	Team	Apps	(Gls)
2020–2022	Trikala	19	(0)
2022	Ionikos	1	(0)
2023–2024	Olympiacos B	0	(0)
2025–	Jarabacao FC	7	(0)
- * Club domestic league appearances and goals as of 26 April 2025

Armando Përlleshi (born 29 January 2003) is an Albanian professional footballer who plays as a goalkeeper for Jarabacao FC.
