= Louis Poznański =

German footballer (born 2001)

Personal information
- Full name: Louis Marcus Poznański
- Date of birth: 24 May 2001 (age 25)
- Place of birth: Bremen, Germany
- Height: 1.84 m (6 ft 0 in)
- Position: Left-back

Team information
- Current team: Rekord Bielsko-Biała
- Number: 24

Youth career
- Habenhauser FV
- –2012: ATSV Sebaldsbrück
- 2012–2018: Werder Bremen
- 2018–2019: Bayern Munich

Senior career*
Years	Team	Apps	(Gls)
2019–2022	Werder Bremen II	13	(0)
2022–2023	PAS Giannina	9	(0)
2023	Lechia Gdańsk	0	(0)
2024–2025	Miedź Legnica II	41	(2)
2025–	Rekord Bielsko-Biała	16	(0)

International career
2015	Poland U15	2	(0)
2016	Germany U15	1	(0)
2016–2017	Germany U16	4	(0)
2018	Germany U17	3	(0)
2018–2019	Germany U18	4	(0)
- * Club domestic league appearances and goals as of 11:11, 31 May 2026 (UTC)

Louis Marcus Poznański (born 24 May 2001) is a professional footballer who plays as a left-back for Polish II liga club Rekord Bielsko-Biała. Born in Germany, he represented both his country of birth and Poland at youth level.

== Career ==
On 22 February 2023, Poznański signed with Ekstraklasa side Lechia Gdańsk until the end of the year, with an option to extend his deal until June 2026. He failed to make an appearance for the club before leaving by mutual consent on 1 September 2023.

On 9 February 2024, he joined Miedź Legnica's reserve team on a deal until the end of June 2025, with an option for another year.

On 8 August 2025, Poznański signed a season-long deal with II liga side Rekord Bielsko-Biała.

== Honours ==
Miedź Legnica II

- IV liga Lower Silesia: 2023–24
- Polish Cup (Lower Silesia regionals): 2024–25
- Polish Cup (Legnica regionals): 2024–25
- Lower Silesia Super Cup: 2024
