= Stathis Tachatos =

Greek footballer

Personal information
- Full name: Efstathios Tachatos
- Date of birth: 12 August 2001 (age 25)
- Place of birth: Thessaloniki, Greece
- Height: 1.77 m (5 ft 10 in)
- Position: Right-back

Team information
- Current team: Panserraikos
- Number: 2

Youth career
- 2015–2021: PAOK

Senior career*
Years	Team	Apps	(Gls)
2021	→ Trikala (loan)	10	(0)
2021–2022	PAOK B	21	(1)
2022–2024	Volos	27	(2)
2025	AEL	9	(0)
2025–2026	Kalamata	12	(0)
2026–	Panserraikos	2	(0)
- * Club domestic league appearances and goals as of 20 September 2026

Stathis Tachatos (Greek: Στάθης Τάχατος; born 12 August 2001) is a Greek professional footballer who plays as a right-back for Super League 2 club Panserraikos.

== Career ==
=== Early career ===
Efstathios Tachatos is a full-back who can play on both sides. Characterized by exceptional speed and versatility, he stands out for his dynamism and audacity. Hailing from Akropotamos – he joined PAOK in 2013 – and traveled many miles every day. However, in 2016 he moved into the PAOK Academy House. A title-winner with the Under-19 team and part of the squad that has won two undefeated Superleague league titles without losing a single match. He was loaned to Trikala and has now returned for PAOK B.

In summer 2022 he moved to Volos.

== Career statistics ==
As of 2 April 2026

Club	Season	League			Cup		Continental		Super Cup		Total	
Club	Season	Division	Apps	Goals	Apps	Goals	Apps	Goals	Apps	Goals	Apps	Goals
Trikala (loan)	2020–21	Superleague Greece 2	10	0	0	0	—		—		10	0
PAOK B	2021–22	Superleague Greece 2	21	1	—		—		—		21	1
Volos	2022–23	Superleague Greece	14	2	2	0	—		—		16	2
Volos	2023–24	Superleague Greece	10	0	1	0	—		—		11	0
Volos	2025–25	Superleague Greece	3	0	0	0	—		—		3	0
Volos	Total		27	2	3	0	—		—		30	2
AEL	2024–25	Superleague Greece 2	9	0	0	0	—		—		9	0
Kalamata	2025–26	Superleague Greece 2	13	0	0	0	—		—		13	0
Career total			80	3	3	0	0	0	0	0	83	3
