= Sudais Ali Baba =

Nigerian footballer (born 2000)

Personal information
- Date of birth: 25 August 2000 (age 26)
- Place of birth: Kano, Nigeria
- Height: 1.85 m (6 ft 1 in)
- Position: Forward

Youth career
- 2018–2020: Asteras Tripolis

Senior career*
Years	Team	Apps	(Gls)
2020–2022	Asteras Tripolis	30	(1)
2022	→ Xanthi (loan)	22	(4)
2022	Spartak Trnava	2	(0)
2023	Panserraikos	1	(0)
2023	FC Trollhättan	6	(0)
2024	FC Kano pillars	0	(0)
- * Club domestic league appearances and goals as of 16 June 2023

Sudais Ali Baba (born 25 August 2000) is a Nigerian professional footballer who plays as a forward.

== Career ==
Coming through the youth system, Ali Baba signed a professional contract with Super League Greece side Asteras Tripolis on 28 November 2018. He made his debut on 28 June 2020, in a 1–1 draw to Panetolikos. Ali Baba's first goal came during the 2020–21 season, scoring the 1–1 equalizer in the 76th minute against Atromitos on 6 March 2021. On 18 January 2022, Ali Baba was sent on six-month loan to Xanthi in the Super League 2.

On 9 September 2022, Ali Baba moved to Spartak Trnava in the Slovak Super Liga. In December 2022, Greek club Panserraikos announced the signing of Ali Baba for January 2023 on a one-and-a-half-year contract.

== Style of play ==
Ali Baba can play as either a striker or winger.

== Career statistics ==
As of match played 1 May 2022

Appearances and goals by club, season and competition
Club	Season	League			Greek Cup		Total	
Club	Season	Division	Apps	Goals	Apps	Goals	Apps	Goals
Asteras Tripolis	2019–20	Super League Greece	4	0	—		4	0
Asteras Tripolis	2020–21	Super League Greece	22	1	2	0	24	1
Asteras Tripolis	2021–22	Super League Greece	4	0	1	0	5	0
Asteras Tripolis	Total		30	1	3	0	33	1
Xanthi (loan)	2021–22	Super League Greece 2	22	4	—		22	4
Career total			52	5	3	0	55	5
