= Zisis Karachalios =

Greek footballer

Personal information
- Date of birth: 10 January 1996 (age 30)
- Place of birth: Karditsa, Greece
- Height: 1.81 m (5 ft 11 in)
- Position: Midfielder

Team information
- Current team: OFI
- Number: 6

Youth career
- –2012: Ifestos Karditsas

Senior career*
Years	Team	Apps	(Gls)
2012–2014	Anagennisi Karditsa	19	(0)
2014–2016	Olympiacos	0	(0)
2015–2016	→ Anagennisi Karditsa (loan)	26	(0)
2016–2021	Levadiakos	82	(1)
2021–2024	PAS Giannina	82	(0)
2024–	OFI	55	(2)

International career^{‡}
2014–2015	Greece U19	13	(1)
2016–2018	Greece U21	17	(1)
- * Club domestic league appearances and goals as of 12 September 2026 ‡ National team caps and goals as of 20 November 2018

Zisis Karachalios (Greek: Ζήσης Καραχάλιος; born 10 January 1996) is a Greek professional footballer who plays as a midfielder for Super League club OFI.

== Career ==
Karachalios signed with Super League Greece side PAS Giannina on a free transfer.

== Career statistics ==
As of 30 June 2024

Club	Season	League			Cup		Continental		Other		Total	
Club	Season	Division	Apps	Goals	Apps	Goals	Apps	Goals	Apps	Goals	Apps	Goals
Anagennisi Karditsa	2013–14	Superleague Greece 2	19	0	3	0	—		—		22	0
Anagennisi Karditsa (loan)	2015–16	Superleague Greece 2	26	0	1	0	—		—		27	0
Levadiakos	2016–17	Superleague Greece	14	1	2	0	—		—		16	1
Levadiakos	2017–18	Superleague Greece	8	0	3	0	—		—		11	0
Levadiakos	2018–19	Superleague Greece	19	0	2	0	—		—		21	0
Levadiakos	2019–20	Superleague Greece 2	17	0	0	0	—		—		17	0
Levadiakos	2020–21	Superleague Greece 2	24	0	0	0	—		—		24	0
Levadiakos	Total		82	1	7	0	—		—		89	1
PAS Giannina	2021–22	Superleague Greece	31	0	1	0	—		—		32	0
PAS Giannina	2022–23	Superleague Greece	23	0	1	0	—		—		24	0
PAS Giannina	2023–24	Superleague Greece	28	0	1	0	—		—		29	0
PAS Giannina	Total		82	0	3	0	—		—		85	0
Career total			209	1	14	0	0	0	0	0	223	1

== Honours ==
OFI

- Greek Cup: 2025–26
- Greek Super Cup: 2026
