= Alexis Triadis =

Greek footballer

Personal information
- Date of birth: 16 May 1997 (age 29)
- Place of birth: Herdecke, Germany
- Height: 1.86 m (6 ft 1 in)
- Position: Midfielder

Youth career
- 2001–2004: 1. FC Naurod
- 2004–2010: Eintracht Frankfurt
- 2010–2013: Wehen Wiesbaden
- 2013–2014: Kickers Offenbach
- 2014–2016: SV Gonsenheim

College career
| Years | Team | Apps | (Gls) |
| 2016–2017 | Hartford Hawks | 37 | (5) |
| 2018–2020 | UCLA Bruins | 18 | (2) |

Senior career*
| Years | Team | Apps | (Gls) |
| 2021–2022 | PAS Giannina | 2 | (0) |
- * Club domestic league appearances and goals as of 15 December 2021

Alexis Triadis (Greek: Αλέξης Τριάδης; born 16 May 1997) is a Greek professional footballer who plays as a midfielder.

== Youth career ==
Triadis joined the youth team of 1. FC Naurod at the age of four, where he spent three years at the team in which his older brother Panagiotis played. Both of them took the big step and joined the youth academy of Eintracht Frankfurt in 2004. He spent six years with Eintracht before moving to Wehen Wiesbaden in 2010, where he once again teamed up with his brother. In 2013, he joined the youth setup of Kickers Offenbach. Remaining only for one year, he joined SV Gonsenheim hoping to breakthrough into the first team playing in the Oberliga Rheinland-Pfalz/Saar. Being unable to do so in the two years he was at Gonsenheim, he decided to take the step and move to the United States to pursue a college career alongside his academic studies.

== College career ==
=== Hartford Hawks ===
In 2016, he joined the University of Hartford and thus the Hartford Hawks football team. In his first year in the US, Triadis appeared in 20 games for the Hawks, scoring two goals and assisting his team on three occasions. He was also named to the America East All-Rookie Team and became a member of the America East Academic Honor Roll. Triadis made first career start in the season opener against the Holy Cross Crusaders. On 16 September, he was involved in both goals against the Iona Gaels, recording his first career goal and one assist. On 21 September, he contributed with another assist against Dartmouth Big Green. On 2 November, during the season finale, he scored a goal against the UMass Lowell River Hawks. On 9 November, Triadis also recorded first career post-season point on an assist in Hartford's 2–1 victory against top-seeded Stony Brook Seawolves in the America East Conference semifinals.

In his sophomore year, Triadis managed to make 17 appearances for his team and scoring three goals while also assisting four times. On 20 September, Triadis scored his first goal of the season against the Monmouth Hawks and on 25 September assisted to the success of his team against the Holy Cross Crusaders. On 26 September, Triadis matched a career-high three points with an assist and the game-winning goal at Central Connecticut Blue Devils. He also scored against the Northeastern Huskies on 3 October, while also providing an assist on 15 October against the Stony Brook Seawolves.

=== UCLA Bruins ===
In 2018, Triadis decided to continue his studies at the University of California, Los Angeles to play for the UCLA Bruins, who as he stated have "great coaches, great style of play and a great education in a great city." On 12 September, Triadis made his first appearance for the Bruins against San Diego State Aztecs. In his first season with the Bruins, Triadis managed to only make seven appearances.

On 13 October 2019, Triadis scored his first goal in a Bruin uniform against the California Golden Bears, volleying a Riley Ferch header for the final goal in a 3–3 draw. On 31 October, he also scored in UCLA's rematch with the Golden Bears opening the score in the eighth minute. Triadis was named to the Director's Honor Roll for winter and spring (quarter GPA of 3.0 or higher and pass at least 12 units). In his senior year, he appeared in 11 games and managed to score twice, while also assisting on one occasion.

Having graduated from UCLA, Triadis decided to return to Europe and pursue a professional footballing career.

== Professional career ==
=== PAS Giannina ===
On 29 January 2021, Greek Super League club PAS Giannina announced the signing of Triadis until 30 June 2022.

== Personal life ==
His brother Panagiotis also is a professional footballer.

== Career statistics ==
As of 15 December 2021

Appearances and goals by club, season and competition
| Club | Season | League | League | | Cup | | Other | | Total | |
| Club | Season | League | Apps | Goals | Apps | Goals | Apps | Goals | Apps | Goals |
|---|---|---|---|---|---|---|---|---|---|---|
| PAS Giannina | 2020–21 | Super League | 2 | 0 | 0 | 0 | 0 | 0 | 2 | 0 |
| PAS Giannina | 2021–22 | Super League | 0 | 0 | 0 | 0 | 0 | 0 | 0 | 0 |
| PAS Giannina | Total | | 2 | 0 | 0 | 0 | 0 | 0 | 2 | 0 |
| Career total | | | 2 | 0 | 0 | 0 | 0 | 0 | 2 | 0 |
