= Antonis Trimmatis =

Greek footballer

Personal information
- Full name: Antonios Trimmatis
- Date of birth: 29 April 1999 (age 27)
- Place of birth: Kos, Greece
- Height: 1.76 m (5 ft 9 in)
- Position: Right wing-back

Team information
- Current team: Nestos Chrysoupoli
- Number: 20

Youth career
- 2015–2019: Atromitos

Senior career*
| Years | Team | Apps | (Gls) |
| 2019–2024 | Atromitos | 7 | (0) |
| 2020 | → Ethnikos Piraeus (loan) | 8 | (2) |
| 2021–2022 | → Egaleo (loan) | 33 | (5) |
| 2022–2023 | → Panachaiki (loan) | 12 | (0) |
| 2024–2025 | AEL | 11 | (1) |
| 2025–2026 | Hellas Syros | 22 | (2) |
| 2026– | Nestos Chrysoupoli | 0 | (0) |

International career
| 2017 | Greece U19 | 2 | (1) |
- * Club domestic league appearances and goals as of 25 April 2026

Antonis Trimmatis (Greek: Αντώνης Τριμμάτης; born 29 April 1999) is a Greek professional footballer who plays as a right wing-back for Super League 2 club Nestos Chrysoupoli.
