= Christos Ioannidis =

Greek footballer

Personal information
- Date of birth: 28 July 2004 (age 22)
- Place of birth: Katerini, Greece
- Position: Midfielder

Team information
- Current team: Ionikos
- Number: 23

Senior career*
Years	Team	Apps	(Gls)
2021–2022	Trikala	20	(0)
2022–	Ionikos	1	(0)
- * Club domestic league appearances and goals as of 3 January 2023

Christos Ioannidis (Greek: Χρήστος Ιωαννίδης; born 28 July 2004) is a Greek professional footballer who plays as a midfielder for Super League 2 club Ionikos.
