= Alexandros Kavvadias =

Greek footballer

Personal information
- Full name: Alexandros Konstantinos Kavvadias
- Date of birth: 10 May 2000 (age 26)
- Place of birth: Greece
- Position: Forward

Youth career
- 2017–2019: Panetolikos

Senior career*
Years	Team	Apps	(Gls)
2019–2022	Panetolikos	5	(0)
2020–2021	→ Kallithea (loan)	16	(3)
2021–2022	→ Egaleo (loan)	12	(0)
2022–2023	Haidari		
- * Club domestic league appearances and goals as of 1 May 2022

Alexandros Kavvadias (Greek: Αλέξανδρος Καββαδίας; born 10 May 2000) is a Greek professional footballer who plays as a forward.
