= Giannis Rizos =

Greek footballer

Personal information
- Full name: Ioannis Rizos
- Date of birth: 19 March 2002 (age 24)
- Place of birth: Ioannina, Greece
- Height: 1.72 m (5 ft 8 in)
- Position: Left-back

Team information
- Current team: Tilikratis
- Number: 3

Youth career
- 2015–2020: Atromitos
- 2020–2021: PAS Giannina

Senior career*
| Years | Team | Apps | (Gls) |
| 2021–2023 | PAS Giannina | 3 | (0) |
| 2022–2023 | → Thesprotos (loan) | 25 | (0) |
| 2023– | Tilikratis | 9 | (1) |
- * Club domestic league appearances and goals as of 19:56, 23 January 2024 (UTC)

Giannis Rizos (Greek: Γιάννης Ρίζος; born 19 March 2002) is a Greek professional footballer who plays as a left-back for Super League 2 club Tilikratis.
