= Vasilios Troumpoulos =

Greek footballer

Personal information
- Date of birth: 23 December 2003 (age 22)
- Place of birth: Athens, Greece
- Height: 1.90 m (6 ft 3 in)
- Position: Centre-back

Team information
- Current team: AEK Athens B
- Number: 67

Youth career
- 2019–2021: Lamia

Senior career*
Years	Team	Apps	(Gls)
2021–2022	Lamia	1	(0)
2022–	AEK Athens B	12	(0)

International career^{‡}
2022–	Greece U21	1	(0)
- * Club domestic league appearances and goals as of 15 June 2024 ‡ National team caps and goals as of 23 September 2022

Vasilios Troumpoulos (Greek: Βασίλειος Τρούμπουλος; born 23 December 2003) is a Greek professional footballer who plays as a centre-back for Super League 2 club AEK Athens B.
