= Leonid Mina =

Greek footballer (born 2004)

Personal information
- Full name: Leonidas Mina
- Date of birth: 28 March 2004 (age 22)
- Place of birth: Preveza, Greece
- Height: 1.82 m (6 ft 0 in)
- Position: Forward

Team information
- Current team: PAS Giannina
- Number: 22

Youth career
- PAS Giannina

Senior career*
Years	Team	Apps	(Gls)
2021–	PAS Giannina	33	(0)
2022–2023	→ Werder Bremen II (loan)	16	(7)
- * Club domestic league appearances and goals as of 15 June 2025

Leonid Mina (Greek: Λεωνίδας Μίνα; born 28 March 2004) is a Greek professional footballer who plays as a forward for Super League 2 club PAS Giannina.
