= Vangelis Nikokyrakis =

Greek association football player

Personal information
- Full name: Evangelos Nikokyrakis
- Date of birth: 4 October 2001 (age 25)
- Place of birth: Heraklion, Crete, Greece
- Height: 1.75 m (5 ft 9 in)
- Position: Forward

Team information
- Current team: AEL
- Number: 20

Youth career
- 2014–2018: OFI

Senior career*
Years	Team	Apps	(Gls)
2018–2022	OFI	14	(0)
2021–2022	→ Episkopi (loan)	31	(3)
2022–2023	A.E. Kifisia	18	(1)
2023–2024	Giouchtas	31	(4)
2024–2025	Panionios	16	(3)
2025–2026	Anagennisi Karditsas	24	(2)
2026–	AEL	3	(0)
- * Club domestic league appearances and goals as of 21 September 2026

Vangelis Nikokyrakis (Greek: Βαγγέλης Νοικοκυράκης; born 4 October 2001) is a Greek professional footballer who plays as a forward for Super League 2 club AEL.
