= Alexandros Kardaris =

Greek footballer

Personal information
- Date of birth: 14 January 2001 (age 25)
- Place of birth: Pyrgos, Elis, Greece
- Position: Right-back

Team information
- Current team: PAS Pyrgos
- Number: 2

Youth career
- 2012–2015: Olympiacos
- 2015–2016: Paniliakos
- 2016–2019: Asteras Tripolis

Senior career*
Years	Team	Apps	(Gls)
2019–2022	Asteras Tripolis	1	(0)
2021–2022	→ Ierapetra (loan)	26	(0)
2022–2023	Anagennisi Karditsa	9	(0)
2023	O.F. Ierapetra	14	(0)
2023–2024	Apollon Pontus	19	(0)
2024	Asteras Tripolis B	2	(0)
2025–	PAS Pyrgos	29	(0)

International career^{‡}
2019	Greece U18	4	(0)
- * Club domestic league appearances and goals as of 27 September 2026 ‡ National team caps and goals as of 9 May 2024

Alexandros Kardaris (Greek: Αλέξανδρος Κάρδαρης; born 14 January 2001) is a Greek professional footballer who plays as a right-back for Super League 2 club PAS Pyrgos.
