= Christos Albanis (footballer, born 1999) =

Greek footballer

Personal information
- Date of birth: 8 February 1999 (age 27)
- Place of birth: Athens, Greece
- Height: 1.75 m (5 ft 9 in)
- Position: Winger

Team information
- Current team: Apollon Kalamaria
- Number: 11

Youth career
- 2015–2018: SC Heerenveen

Senior career*
| Years | Team | Apps | (Gls) |
| 2018–2020 | Asteras Tripolis | 0 | (0) |
| 2019–2020 | → Karaiskakis (loan) | 16 | (2) |
| 2020–2021 | Trikala | 13 | (2) |
| 2021–2022 | Levadiakos | 4 | (0) |
| 2022 | → Panathinaikos B (loan) | 16 | (2) |
| 2022–2023 | Panathinaikos B | 7 | (1) |
| 2023– | Apollon Kalamaria | 1 | (0) |

International career
| 2017 | Greece U19 | 2 | (0) |
- * Club domestic league appearances and goals as of 19:44, 3 October 2023 (UTC)

Christos Albanis (Greek: Χρήστος Αλμπάνης; born 8 February 1999) is a Greek professional footballer who plays as a winger for Super League 2 club Apollon Kalamaria.
