= Vasilios Soulis =

Greek footballer

Personal information
- Date of birth: 7 December 1994 (age 31)
- Place of birth: Patras, Greece
- Height: 1.99 m (6 ft 6 in)
- Position: Goalkeeper

Team information
- Current team: Panachaiki

Youth career
- –2014: Thyella Patras

Senior career*
Years	Team	Apps	(Gls)
2014–2016	Doxa Nea Manolada	3	(0)
2016	PAO Varda	6	(0)
2016–2020	Panachaiki	45	(0)
2020	Platanias	5	(0)
2020–2021	Panachaiki	7	(0)
2021–2024	PAS Giannina	18	(0)
2024–2025	Niki Volos	6	(0)
2025–2026	PAS Pyrgos		
2026–	Panachaiki		
- * Club domestic league appearances and goals

Vasilios Soulis (Greek: Βασίλειος Σούλης; born 7 December 1994) is a Greek professional footballer who plays as a goalkeeper for Gamma Ethniki club Panachaiki.
