= Ahmad Mendes Moreira =

Guinean footballer

Personal information
- Date of birth: 27 June 1995 (age 31)
- Place of birth: Schiedam, Netherlands
- Height: 1.78 m (5 ft 10 in)
- Position: Winger

Team information
- Current team: Kalamata
- Number: 20

Youth career
- 2001–2004: VVK '68
- 2004–2006: SC Feyenoord
- 2006–2011: Excelsior '20
- 2011–2014: Excelsior Maassluis

Senior career*
| Years | Team | Apps | (Gls) |
| 2014–2016 | Excelsior Maassluis | 63 | (14) |
| 2016–2018 | Kozakken Boys | 63 | (21) |
| 2018–2019 | Groningen | 13 | (1) |
| 2018–2019 | → Telstar (loan) | 17 | (2) |
| 2019–2021 | Excelsior Rotterdam | 63 | (14) |
| 2021–2023 | PAS Giannina | 57 | (3) |
| 2023–2024 | AEL Limassol | 31 | (4) |
| 2024– | Kalamata | 52 | (11) |

International career^{‡}
| 2021– | Guinea | 5 | (0) |
- * Club domestic league appearances and goals as of 20 September 2026 ‡ National team caps and goals as of 01:35, 31 March 2024 (UTC)

Ahmad Mendes Moreira (born 27 June 1995) is a Guinean professional footballer who plays as a winger for Greek Super League club Kalamata. Born in the Netherlands, he plays for the Guinea national team.

== Club career ==
On 4 April 2018, Mendes Moreira signed a contract with effect from 1 July 2018 until mid-2019 with FC Groningen. Previously, he had been playing for Kozakken Boys at amateur level.

On 12 August 2018, he made his official debut as a substitute for FC Groningen in the Eredivisie away match against SBV Vitesse, which ended in a 5–1 defeat.

He transferred to Excelsior Rotterdam in July 2019 on a two-year contract.

In November 2019 Mendes Moreira was subjected to racism from opposition FC Den Bosch fans. FC Den Bosch initially tried to claim the sounds were their fans imitating crows, but later apologized for the claim.

On 6 August 2021, he signed a contract with PAS Giannina.

== International career ==
Mendes Moreira was born in the Netherlands to a Bissau-Guinean father and a Guinean Loma mother. He debuted for the Guinea national team in a friendly 0–0 tie with Turkey on 31 May 2021.
