= Juan Domínguez (footballer, born 1990) =

Spanish footballer

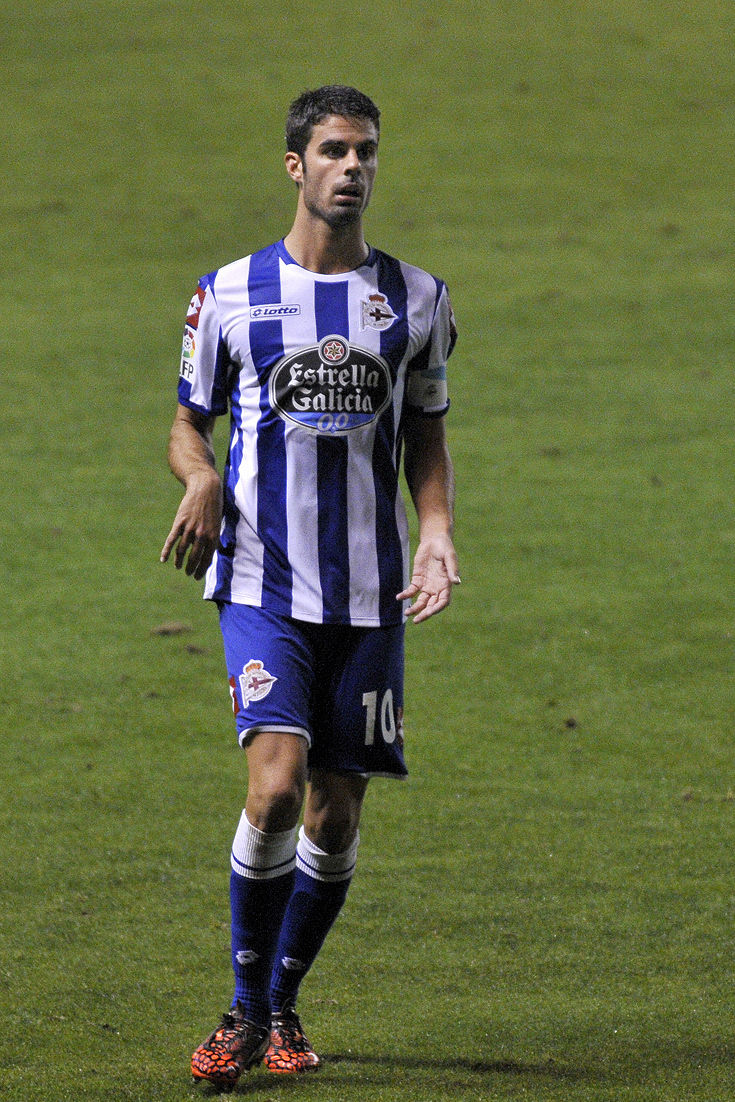
- Domínguez as a Deportivo player in 2014

Personal information
- Full name: Juan Domínguez Lamas
- Date of birth: 8 January 1990 (age 36)
- Place of birth: Pontedeume, Spain
- Height: 1.81 m (5 ft 11 in)
- Position: Central midfielder

Youth career
- 2001–2004: Narón
- 2004–2008: Deportivo La Coruña

Senior career*
Years	Team	Apps	(Gls)
2008–2010	Deportivo B	35	(4)
2009–2017	Deportivo La Coruña	158	(10)
2016–2017	→ Mallorca (loan)	30	(1)
2017–2019	Reus	50	(3)
2019–2020	Sturm Graz	40	(4)
2020–2022	PAS Giannina	55	(1)
2022–2023	Asteras Tripolis	9	(0)
Total		377	(23)
- * Club domestic league appearances and goals

Juan Domínguez Lamas (born 8 January 1990) is a Spanish former professional footballer who played as a central midfielder.

== Club career ==
=== Deportivo ===
Domínguez was born in Pontedeume, Galicia. He finished his youth career with Deportivo de La Coruña, and made his debut for the first team on 13 December 2009 by replacing club great Juan Carlos Valerón for the final 35 minutes of a 1–1 away draw against UD Almería. He finished his first season with 13 La Liga appearances (eight starts, 744 minutes), helping them to the tenth position.

On 25 November 2011, Domínguez scored his first professional goal, his side's second in the 3–1 home victory over the same opponents. Roughly a month later, he renewed his contract until 2015.

Domínguez helped Deportivo to achieve promotion from Segunda División in 2012 and 2014, contributing 74 games and eight goals in the process. He scored his first goal in the top flight on 27 October 2012, in a 1–1 draw at RC Celta de Vigo.

On 28 June 2016, having featured rarely during the season, Domínguez was loaned to RCD Mallorca of the second division.

=== Reus ===
On 23 August 2017, Domínguez signed a three-year contract with fellow second-tier team CF Reus Deportiu after cutting ties with his parent club. He scored twice in 32 matches during the campaign as they finished in 14th place.

Halfway through 2018–19, Domínguez and the rest of the squad left after it was expelled by the Liga Nacional de Fútbol Profesional.

=== Abroad ===
On 13 February 2019, the free agent Domínguez moved to the Austrian Football Bundesliga with SK Sturm Graz after agreeing to a one-and-a-half-year deal. On 29 August 2020, he joined PAS Giannina F.C. of Super League Greece.

Domínguez announced his retirement in April 2023, aged 33. He settled in A Coruña and removed himself from the football world.

== Career statistics ==
As of 28 May 2021

Appearances and goals by club, season and competition
Club	Season	League			Cup		Continental		Other		Total	
Club	Season	Division	Apps	Goals	Apps	Goals	Apps	Goals	Apps	Goals	Apps	Goals
Deportivo	2009–10	La Liga	13	0	2	0	—		—		15	0
Deportivo	2010–11	La Liga	20	0	1	0	—		—		21	0
Deportivo	2011–12	Segunda División	35	4	2	1	—		—		37	5
Deportivo	2012–13	La Liga	24	1	2	0	—		—		26	1
Deportivo	2013–14	Segunda División	39	4	0	0	—		—		39	4
Deportivo	2014–15	La Liga	22	1	2	0	—		—		24	1
Deportivo	2015–16	La Liga	5	0	4	1	—		—		9	1
Deportivo	Total		158	10	13	2	—		—		171	12
Mallorca (loan)	2016–17	Segunda División	30	1	1	0	—		—		31	0
Reus	2017–18	Segunda División	32	2	1	0	—		—		33	2
Reus	2018–19	Segunda División	18	1	2	1	—		—		20	2
Reus	Total		50	3	3	1	—		—		53	4
Sturm Graz	2018–19	Austrian Bundesliga	12	0	—		—		—		12	0
Sturm Graz	2019–20	Austrian Bundesliga	28	4	4	2	2 (Note: Appearances in UEFA Europa League)	0	—		34	6
Sturm Graz	Total		40	4	4	2	2	0	—		46	6
PAS Giannina	2020–21	Super League Greece	26	0	4	0	—		—		30	0
Career total			304	18	25	5	2	0	0	0	331	23

== Honours ==
Deportivo

- Segunda División: 2011–12

Individual

- Segunda División Best Midfielder: 2013–14
