= Caleb Stanko =

American soccer player (born 1993)

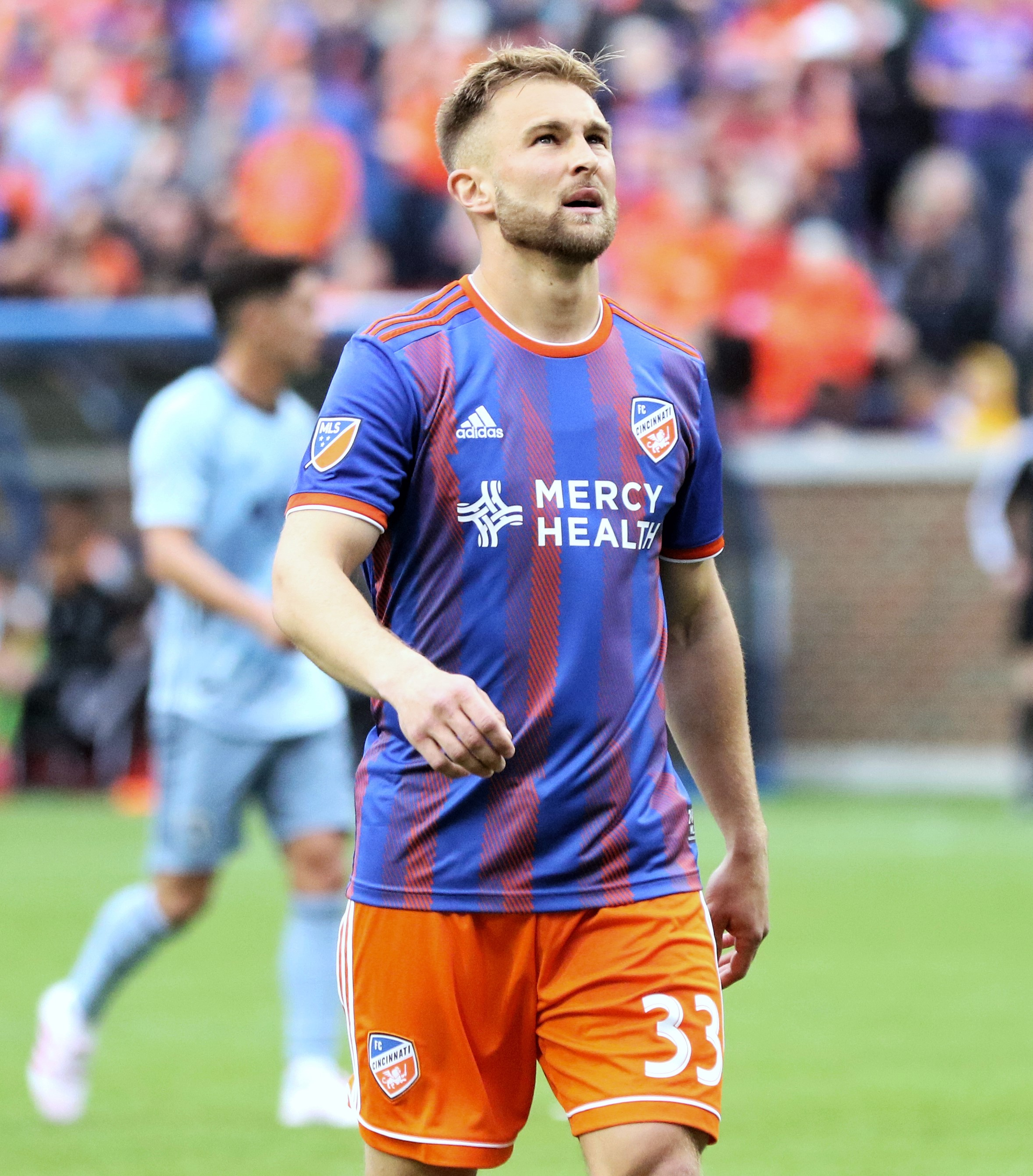
- Stanko with FC Cincinnati in 2019

Personal information
- Full name: Caleb Stanko
- Date of birth: July 26, 1993 (age 33)
- Place of birth: Holly, Michigan, United States
- Height: 5 ft 11 in (1.80 m)
- Positions: Defensive midfielder; center back

Youth career
- –2011: Vardar SC
- 2011–2013: SC Freiburg

Senior career*
Years	Team	Apps	(Gls)
2011–2019	SC Freiburg II	71	(3)
2013–2019	SC Freiburg	11	(0)
2016–2017	→ FC Vaduz (loan)	26	(0)
2019–2021	FC Cincinnati	57	(0)
2022	PAS Giannina	20	(0)
2022	Asteras Tripolis	10	(1)
2023–2024	Lamia	36	(0)

International career^{‡}
2013	United States U20	8	(0)
2016	United States	1	(0)
- * Club domestic league appearances and goals as of May 15, 2024 ‡ National team caps and goals as of September 6, 2016

Caleb James Stanko (born July 26, 1993) is an American professional soccer player who plays as a midfielder.

== Early life ==
Stanko started playing soccer with the local U.S. Soccer Development Academy club Vardar SC. Won U.S. Soccer Development Academy National Championship in 2010.

== Club career ==
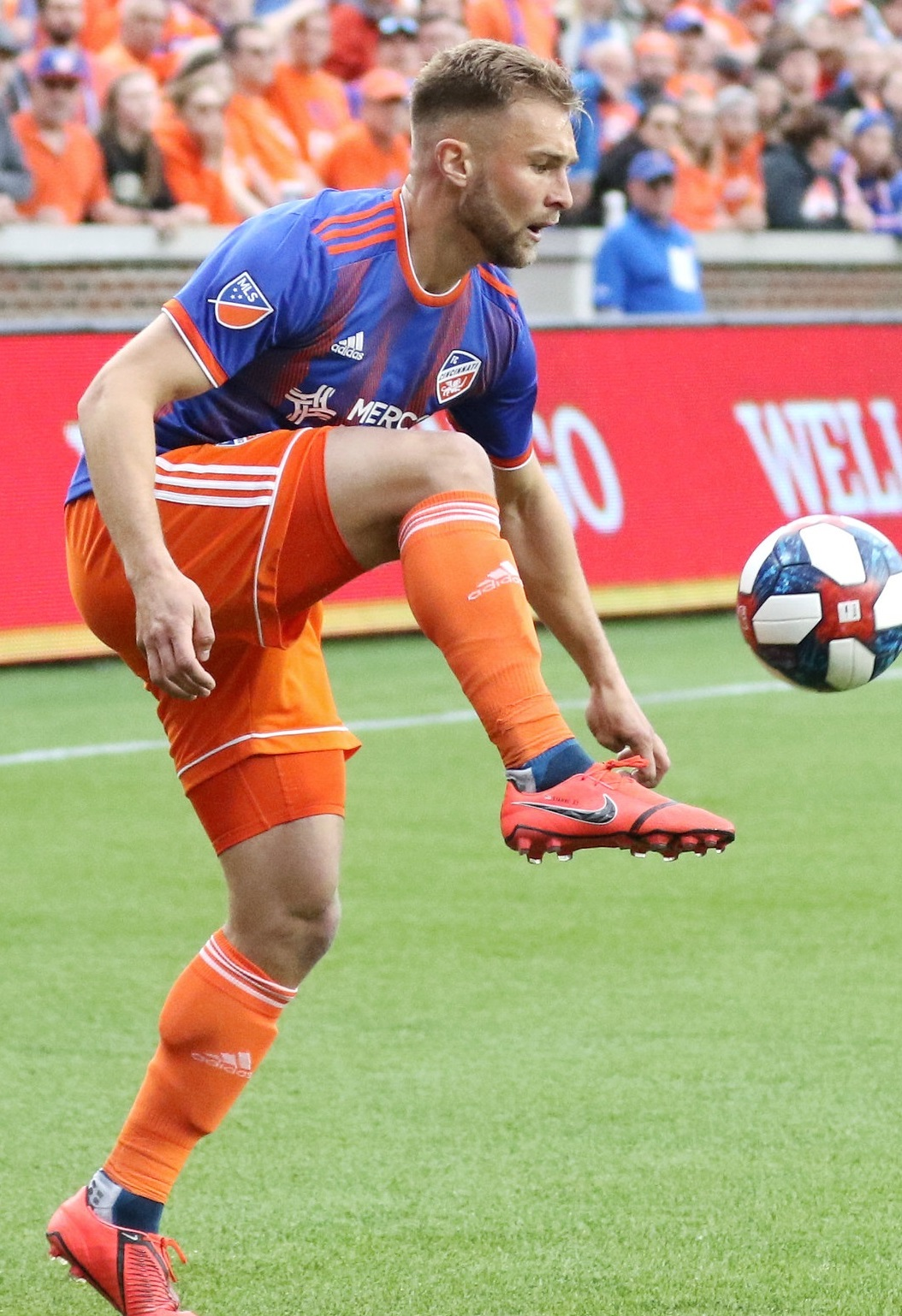
Caleb Stanko with FC Cincinnati on April 7, 2019

=== SC Freiburg ===
In 2011, Stanko moved to the German side SC Freiburg, and began playing for its second team. From 2013, he started training with the first team and was benched for several matches before debuting in August 2015 in a German Cup match against Barmbek-Uhlenhorst. In November 2015, he made his league debut for Freiburg in a 2. Bundesliga match against Paderborn 07. Stanko had five 2. Bundesliga appearances for the season, helping Freiburg to Bundesliga promotion.

==== Loan to FC Vaduz ====
Stanko was loaned by Freiburg to Liechtenstein-based FC Vaduz in the Swiss Super League for the 2016–2017 season, making 26 appearances.

=== FC Cincinnati ===
On January 23, 2019, Stanko moved back to the United States to sign with Major League Soccer side FC Cincinnati. Following the 2021 season, Cincinnati declined their contract option on Stanko.

=== PAS Giannina ===
On January 5, 2022, Stanko signed a contract with Super League Greece club PAS Giannina.

== International career ==
Stanko played at the 2013 CONCACAF U-20 Championship for the United States, who finished as runners-up. Later that year, he also played at the 2013 Toulon Tournament for the U.S., and then captained the U.S. during their opening match against Spain at the 2013 FIFA U-20 World Cup.

Stanko received his first call-up to the United States men's national team for a May 22, 2016 friendly against Puerto Rico. On September 6, 2016, he made his full USMNT debut in a World Cup qualifying match against Trinidad & Tobago.

== Career statistics ==
=== Club ===
As of match played November 15, 2020

Appearances and goals by club, season and competition
Club	Season	League			National cup		Other		Total	
Club	Season	Division	Apps	Goals	Apps	Goals	Apps	Goals	Apps	Goals
SC Freiburg II	2011–12	Regionalliga Südwest	1	0	—		—		1	0
SC Freiburg II	2012–13	Regionalliga Südwest	17	0	—		—		17	0
SC Freiburg II	2013–14	Regionalliga Südwest	32	3	—		—		32	3
SC Freiburg II	2014–15	Regionalliga Südwest	6	0	—		—		6	0
SC Freiburg II	2015–16	Regionalliga Südwest	13	0	—		—		13	0
SC Freiburg II	2017–18	Regionalliga Südwest	1	0	—		—		1	0
SC Freiburg II	2018–19	Regionalliga Südwest	1	0	—		—		1	0
SC Freiburg II	Total		71	3	—		0	0	71	3
SC Freiburg	2015–16	2. Bundesliga	5	0	1	0	—		6	0
SC Freiburg	2017–18	Bundesliga	6	0	1	0	0	0	7	0
SC Freiburg	Total		11	0	2	0	0	0	13	0
FC Vaduz (loan)	2016–17	Swiss Super League	26	0	0	0	—		26	0
FC Cincinnati	2019	Major League Soccer	23	0	2	0	—		25	0
FC Cincinnati	2020	Major League Soccer	13	0	—		1 (Note: Appearance(s) in MLS is Back Tournament)	0	14	0
FC Cincinnati	Total		36	0	2	0	1	0	39	0
Career total			144	3	4	0	1	0	149	3

== Honors ==
FC Vaduz

- Liechtenstein Football Cup: 2016–17
