= Panagiotis Triadis =

Greek footballer

Personal information
- Date of birth: 9 September 1992 (age 34)
- Place of birth: Herdecke, Germany
- Height: 1.78 m (5 ft 10 in)
- Position: Attacking midfielder

Youth career
- 2002–2004: 1. FC Naurod
- 2004–2008: Eintracht Frankfurt
- 2008–2011: Wehen Wiesbaden

Senior career*
Years	Team	Apps	(Gls)
2010–2012	Wehen Wiesbaden II	12	(0)
2011–2012	Wehen Wiesbaden	5	(0)
2012–2018	Xanthi	80	(5)
2018–2019	Apollon Smyrnis	14	(2)
2019–2020	NorthEast United	14	(2)
2021–2022	PAS Giannina	8	(0)

International career
2005–2006	Germany U15	15	(7)
2006–2007	Germany U16	11	(5)
2007	Germany U17	2	(0)
2010–2011	Greece U19	3	(1)
- * Club domestic league appearances and goals as of 23 January 2022

Panagiotis Triadis (Greek: Παναγιώτης Τριάδης; born 9 September 1992) is a Greek professional footballer who plays as an attacking midfielder.

== Youth career ==
=== 1. FC Naurod ===
2002–04

Triadis started playing football for 1. FC Naurod, a team from the outskirts of Wiesbaden, where he has lived since 1998. With outstanding performances, clubs started showing interest in him with his move just being a matter of time.

=== Eintracht Frankfurt ===
2004–08

In 2004, at the age of 12, Triadis joined the youth system of Eintracht Frankfurt. During his four-year tenure at the club, he was hailed as a big and upcoming prospect for the team. Suffering from a tibia fracture, Triadis' chances quickly diminished.

=== Wehen Wiesbaden ===
2008–11

In 2008, and after recovering from his injury, Triadis moved to the youth system of Wehen Wiesbaden, for a transfer fee of €50,000. He was part of the youth team until 2011, having played for both the U17 and U19.

=== Wehen Wiesbaden II ===
2010–11

While still being part of the youth team, Triadis also got several chances in the Wehen Wiesbaden II squad, playing in the Regionalliga Süd. He managed to make four appearances. At the end of the season, Wehen Wiesbaden II got relegated to the fifth tier, the Hessenliga.

== Senior career ==
=== Wehen Wiesbaden ===
2010–11

In early 2011, at the age of 19, Triadis signed a professional contract keeping him at the club until 30 June 2012. In April 2011, Triadis came off the bench to make his debut in the Hessian Cup semifinal against TGM SV Jügesheim, in a 5–0 victory. He assisted two goals, with a chance of scoring himself.

2011–12

Triadis started playing for both the first team, in the 3. Liga, as well as for the second team, now playing in the Hessenliga. He made his 3. Liga debut on second matchday, a goalless draw against VfB Stuttgart II. More match contributions followed throughout the season, managing to make a total of five appearances for the club, with an additional eight appearances for the second team. At the end of the season, his contract did not get expanded.

=== Xanthi ===
2012–13

Following the release from his previous club, Triadis signed with Greek Super League side Xanthi on a free transfer. He made his debut, on seventh matchday, against Olympiakos, in a 0–4 defeat. Triadis then made his starting line-up debut against PAS Giannina, playing for the whole 90 minutes, and having been named player of the game, despite a 0–1 loss. On 14th matchday he was part of the team beating Panionios 4–0.

2013–14

Triadis made his European debut, in the UEFA Europa League second qualifying round, against Northern Irish side Linfield FC in a 0–1 loss, where he almost scored from a freekick. Xanthi proceeded to the next round after beating Linfield FC with 2–1 after extra time in Northern Ireland. He made an imprint, in the third qualifying round match against Standard Liege, when he came on very strong assisting the goal for Julian De Guzman, having beaten three players and crossing it in for the scorer. Xanthi got eliminated after losing 2–4 on aggregate. This season turned out to become Triadis' breakthrough for Xanthi. He was playing in almost all matches of the season, with a three-goal conversion. Following the first time in six years, playing in Europe, Xanthi disappointedly finished 16th, having to play the Relegation play-off against Olympiacos Volos. Xanthi managed to stay in the Super League after beating the Thessalian side with 2–1.

2014–15

After last season's uprise, things soon turned opposite for Triadis. During pre-season, an adductor injury left him out for eight months, resulting him to miss the season. Triadis made his debut in the 2014–15 season on 32nd matchday against Panathinaikos, in a 0–2 defeat. The following matchday, he was able to play full-time, in a goalless draw against Asteras Tripolis. His third match of the season came on last matchday against Panthrakikos, which resulted in a 0–2 defeat, finishing Xanthi on 8th place, missing out on the play-offs.

2015–16

Similar to the previous season, Triadis missed out on the first few games, due to a strained muscle. Being able to quickly recover, Triadis managed to contribute to the season and be of use to his team. Xanthi manager Răzvan Lucescu didn't make excessive use of Triadis during this season, using him in only a third of all league matches. Triadis managed to make two assists, against PAOK and Levadiakos, with both matches drawing 1–1 and 2–2 respectively. Xanthi failed to play for a European spot, finishing 13th.

2016–17

Triadis is bound to make his fifth season with Xanthi. He was in the starting lineup, in the first match of the season, a 0–3 loss to Panionios. On 4th matchday, Triadis got substituted in helping his team gain an important point against Atromitos. After having been benched for the majority of the first few league matches, manager Răzvan Lucescu, fielded him as starter in the first cup match against PAS Giannina, in a 0–1 loss. Triadis managed to score his first goal since the 2013–14 season, in an away match against Panetolikos, helping his team on a 2–3 away win. In the match against AEL, a 1–0 home victory, Triadis contributed to the win by assisting for scorer Theodoros Vasilakakis. In a 3–1 win over Iraklis, Triadis scored a goal himself and contributed to the final goal of the match by assisting for Hamza Younes. In the match against AEK Athens, a goalless draw, Triadis was sent-off after 58 minutes, after receiving a yellow card four minutes prior. Besides scoring two goals, Triadis ended the season by making six assists, ranking him in second place alongside Kostas Fortounis and Masoud Shojaei, from Olympiacos and Panionios respectively. Xanthi ended the season as 6th, barely missing out on a spot in the playoffs.

2017–18

With Xanthi changing managers, from Răzvan Lucescu to Milan Rastavac, Triadis needed to prove himself, despite a strong previous season, in order to become a starter with the new manager. In the first cup match of the season, a 2–0 victory over Panetolikos, Triadis scored the second goal, making it the very first goal of his career in a non-league match. After mostly being used as a substitute in league matches, Triadis was announced as a starter in the second cup match, a 4–2 win over Ergotelis, in which he took his chance by scoring twice and by making an assist. On 4 November, Triadis made his overall 100th career game in a 3–1 victory over Panetolikos. Shortly thereafter, Triadis fractured his hand leaving him out for several weeks. After a difficult time in which he wasn't getting regular playing time Triadis played full time against Panetolikos, where he gave an assist to Matías Gastón Castro, who scored the 1–0 winning goal.

=== Apollon Smyrnis ===
2018–19

On 12 July 2018, Apollon Smyrnis announced the signing of Triadis on a free transfer. Triadis made his debut for his new team on first matchday in a 0–1 loss against AEL, after being substituted in for Justin Eilers in the 58th minute. On 15 September 2018, in a 1–2 defeat against PAS Giannina, in which he also assisted in his team's only goal, Triadis made his 100th career league match. He scored his first goal for Apollon Smyrnis, on 12 November 2018, in a 1–2 home loss against Aris Thessaloniki. On 14 January 2019, he terminated his contract by mutual consent.

=== NorthEast United ===
2018–19

On 18 January 2019, Triadis signed for ISL side NorthEast United on a free transfer. His move to India makes him the fourth Greek player signing for a club in the ISL, and the second for NorthEast United, after former international goalkeeper Alexandros Tzorvas' involvement with the club in their inaugural season. On 26 January 2019, he made his debut for his new team in a 1–0 win over Chennaiyin, after being substituted on in the 75th minute for Federico Gallego. Despite being with the team since only four months, Triadis managed to impress the fans by winning the Fan's Player of the Season award for best midfielder.

2019–20

On 18 September 2019, it was officially announced that Triadis will remain at NorthEast United for the 2019–20 season. On 27 November 2019, he scored his first goal for the club in a 2–2 against Mumbai City FC. On 2 December 2019, Triadis scored his second goal in the 90th minute, reaching a very important 1–1 draw against Jamshedpur. On 30 December 2019, NorthEast United and Triadis parted ways.

=== PAS Giannina ===
On 13 June 2021, PAS Giannina announced the signing of Triadis on a free transfer.

== Personal life ==
Triadis was born in Herdecke, Germany to Greek parents. During his childhood, he and his family moved to Wiesbaden, while attending the Frankfurt International School. He is fluent in Greek, German, and English. His younger brother Alexis currently plays for PAS Giannina.

== Career statistics ==
=== Club ===
As of 23 January 2022

Club	Season	League	League		Cup (Note: Includes DFB-Pokal, Greek Cup and Hero Super Cup)		Continental (Note: Appearances in UEFA Europa League qualifying rounds)		Other (Note: Includes Hessian Cup and Super League Relegation Playoff)		Total	
Club	Season	League	Apps	Goals	Apps	Goals	Apps	Goals	Apps	Goals	Apps	Goals
Wehen Wiesbaden II	2010–11	Regionalliga Süd	4	0	–						4	0
Wehen Wiesbaden II	2011–12	Hessenliga	8	0	–						8	0
Wehen Wiesbaden II	Total		12	0	–						12	0
Wehen Wiesbaden	2010–11	3. Liga	0	0	–		–		1	0	1	0
Wehen Wiesbaden	2011–12	3. Liga	5	0	0	0	–		–		5	0
Wehen Wiesbaden	Total		5	0	0	0	–		1	0	6	0
Xanthi	2012–13	Super League Greece	3	0	1	0	–				4	0
Xanthi	2013–14	Super League Greece	21	3	1	0	2	0	0	0	24	3
Xanthi	2014–15	Super League Greece	3	0	1	0	–				4	0
Xanthi	2015–16	Super League Greece	10	0	2	0	–				12	0
Xanthi	2016–17	Super League Greece	24	2	6	0	–				30	2
Xanthi	2017–18	Super League Greece	19	0	3	3	–				22	3
Xanthi	Total		80	5	14	3	2	0	0	0	96	8
Apollon Smyrnis	2018–19	Super League Greece	14	2	1	0	–				15	2
Apollon Smyrnis	Total		14	2	1	0	–				15	2
NorthEast United	2018–19	Indian Super League	7	0	1	0	–				8	0
NorthEast United	2019–20	Indian Super League	7	2	0	0	–				7	2
NorthEast United	Total		14	2	1	0	–				15	2
PAS Giannina	2021–22	Super League Greece	8	0	1	0	–		0	0	9	0
Career Total			133	9	17	3	2	0	1	0	153	12
