= Oluwatobiloba Alagbe =

Nigerian footballer (born 2000)

Personal information
- Full name: Oluwatobiloba Adefunyibomi Alagbe
- Date of birth: 24 April 2000 (age 26)
- Place of birth: Lagos, Nigeria
- Height: 1.87 m (6 ft 2 in)
- Positions: Defensive midfielder; centre-back

Team information
- Current team: Argeș Pitești
- Number: 69

Youth career
- 2019–2020: Asteras Tripolis

Senior career*
Years	Team	Apps	(Gls)
2020–2026	Asteras Tripolis	89	(4)
2021–2022	→ Jeunesse Esch (loan)	17	(1)
2022	→ Progrès Niederkorn (loan)	10	(1)
2026–	Argeș Pitești	12	(0)
- * Club domestic league appearances and goals as of 6 November 2026

Oluwatobiloba Adefunyibomi "Tobi" Alagbe (born 24 April 2000) is a Nigerian professional footballer who plays as a defensive midfielder or a centre-back for Liga I club Argeș Pitești.

== Career ==
Alagbe joined Asteras Tripolis in 2019. After playing 27 games with the under-19 team, Alagbe his senior debut in 2020.

On 1 July 2021, Alagbe moved to Luxembourg National Division club Jeunesse Esch on a one-year loan. In 2022, he joined fellow Luxembourg National Division club Progrès Niederkorn on a one-year loan.

Alagbe left Asteras in July 2026, after playing 101 games in all competitions.

On 26 July 2026, Alagbe joined Liga I club Argeș Pitești.

== Style of play ==
Mainly a defensive midfielder, Alagbe can also play as a centre-back.

== Career statistics ==
=== Club ===
As of match played 6 November 2026

Club	Season	League			National cup (Note: Includes Greek Cup, Luxembourg Cup, Cupa României)		Total	
Club	Season	Division	Apps	Goals	Apps	Goals	Apps	Goals
Asteras Tripolis	2019–20	Super League Greece	3	0	—		3	0
Asteras Tripolis	2020–21	Super League Greece	0	0	0	0	0	0
Asteras Tripolis	2021–22	Super League Greece	—		—		0	0
Asteras Tripolis	2022–23	Super League Greece	10	0	—		5	0
Asteras Tripolis	2023–24	Super League Greece	24	1	3	0	27	1
Asteras Tripolis	2024–25	Super League Greece	29	2	6	0	35	2
Asteras Tripolis	2025–26	Super League Greece	23	1	3	0	26	1
Asteras Tripolis	Total		89	4	12	0	101	4
Jeunesse Esch (loan)	2021–22	Luxembourg National Division	17	1	1	0	18	1
Progrès Niederkorn (loan)	2022–23	Luxembourg National Division	10	1	1	0	11	1
Argeș Pitești	2026–27	Liga I	12	0	2	0	14	0
Career total			128	6	16	0	144	6
