= Dimitrios Karagiannis =

Greek footballer

Personal information
- Full name: Dimitrios Karagiannis
- Date of birth: 27 February 2001 (age 25)
- Place of birth: Mandra, Attica, Greece
- Height: 1.84 m (6 ft 0 in)
- Position: Centre-back

Team information
- Current team: Diagoras

Youth career
- 2012–2020: Panathinaikos

Senior career*
| Years | Team | Apps | (Gls) |
| 2020–2021 | Panathinaikos | 4 | (0) |
| 2021–2022 | PAS Giannina | 0 | (0) |
| 2022– | Diagoras | 0 | (0) |
- * Club domestic league appearances and goals as of 21:07, 16 May 2021 (UTC).

Dimitrios Karagiannis (Greek: Δημήτριος Καραγιάννης; born 27 February 2001) is a Greek professional footballer who plays as a centre-back for Diagoras.
