= Juan José Perea =

Colombian footballer (born 2000)

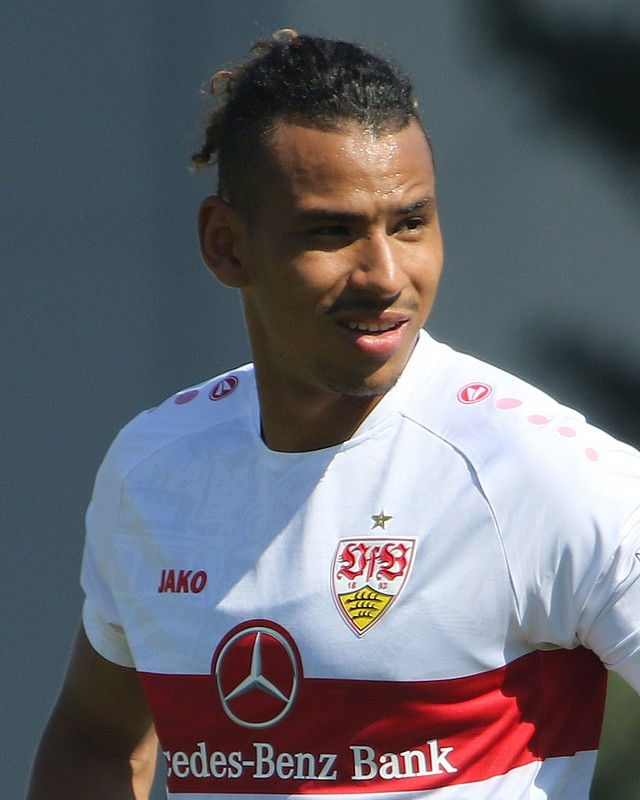
- Perea with VfB Stuttgart in 2022

Personal information
- Full name: Juan José Perea Mendoza
- Date of birth: 23 February 2000 (age 26)
- Place of birth: Bogotá, Colombia
- Height: 1.80 m (5 ft 11 in)
- Position: Forward

Team information
- Current team: Atromitos
- Number: 9

Youth career
- 2015–2018: Escofutuper
- 2018–2019: Porto

Senior career*
Years	Team	Apps	(Gls)
2019–2021	Panathinaikos	23	(3)
2020–2021	→ Volos (loan)	27	(3)
2021–2022	PAS Giannina	32	(10)
2022–2025	Stuttgart	16	(1)
2023–2024	→ Hansa Rostock (loan)	33	(4)
2024–2025	→ Zürich (loan)	22	(7)
2025–2026	Zürich	22	(2)
2026–	Atromitos	5	(1)
- * Club domestic league appearances and goals as of 3 November 2026

Juan José Perea Mendoza (born 23 February 2000) is a Colombian professional footballer who plays as a forward for Super League Greece club Atromitos.

== Career ==
=== Porto and Panathinaikos ===
Perea played for Porto, helping the club to win the 2018–19 UEFA Youth League. He made three appearances in the competition for the Portuguese club.

Perea joined Panathinaikos in the summer of 2019, signing a two-year contract for an undisclosed fee. He made his first appearance for Panathinaikos in the Super League Greece against the team's 3–1 loss to OFI on 31 August 2019. On 10 November 2019, he scored his first goal in the 3–2 win for Panathinaikos in the Athenian derby against AEK Athens.

On 1 September 2020, he joined the Greek club Volos.

=== PAS Giannina ===
On 19 July 2021, Perea signed a three-year contract with PAS Giannina.

In early January 2022, he was linked with domestic and foreign clubs, including AEK Athens. PAS Giannina reportedly demanded a €1 million transfer fee with Perea's former club Panathinaikos retaining the right to claim the player by matching any offer.

=== VfB Stuttgart ===
On 8 July 2022, VfB Stuttgart announced the signing of Perea on a four-year deal. The transfer fee was reported as over €2.2 million, becoming the most expensive player sold by PAS Giannina.

==== Loan to Hansa Rostock ====
On 4 August 2023, Perea moved to 2. Bundesliga club Hansa Rostock on a season-long loan.

=== FC Zürich ===
On 24 June 2024, he was loaned to Swiss Super League side FC Zürich, with an option to buy.

On 26 July 2025, Zürich announced that they had activated their option to buy, Perea signing an initial one-year deal with the option for a further two years.

=== Atromitos ===
On 6 September 2026, Perea signed for Super League Greece club Atromitos on a free transfer.

== Career statistics ==
As of 19 May 2024

Appearances and goals by club, season and competition
Club	Season	League			Cup (Note: Appearances in Greek Cup and DFB-Pokal)		Continental		Other		Total	
Club	Season	Division	Apps	Goals	Apps	Goals	Apps	Goals	Apps	Goals	Apps	Goals
Panathinaikos	2019–20	Super League Greece	23	3	5	0	—		—		28	3
Volos (loan)	2020–21	Super League Greece	27	3	4	0	—		—		31	3
PAS Giannina	2021–22	Super League Greece	32	10	1	0	—		—		33	10
VfB Stuttgart	2022–23	Bundesliga	16	1	3	0	—		—		19	1
Hansa Rostock (loan)	2023–24	2. Bundesliga	33	4	2	0	—		—		35	4
Career total			131	21	15	0	0	0	0	0	146	22

== Honours ==
Porto youth

- UEFA Youth League: 2018–19

Individual

- PAS Giannina Player of the Year: 2021–22
