= Michael Gardawski =

German footballer

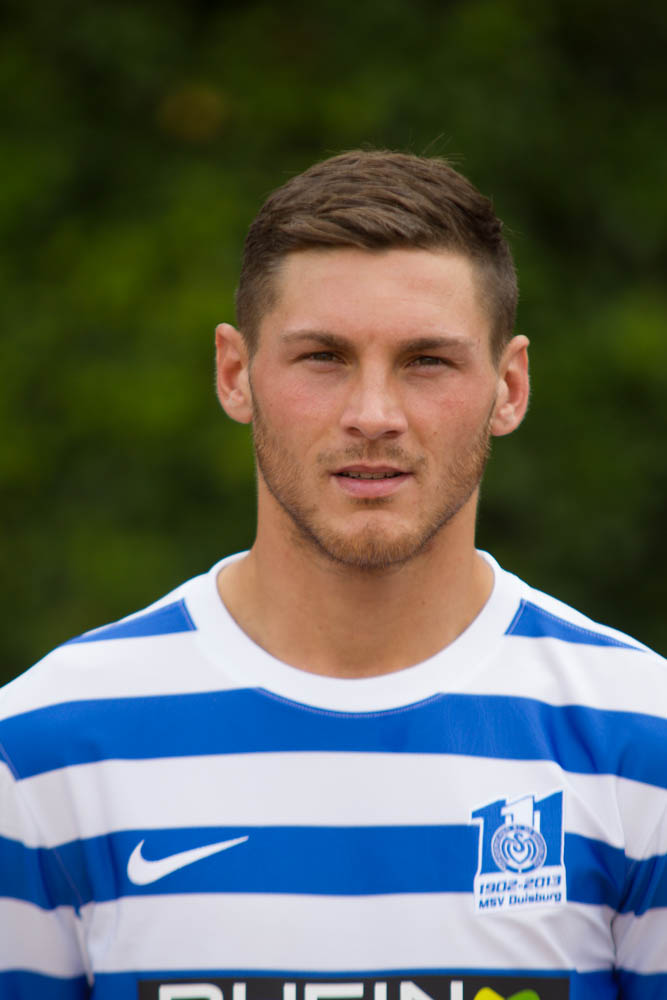
- Gardawski in 2013

Personal information
- Date of birth: 25 September 1990 (age 36)
- Place of birth: Cologne, Germany
- Height: 1.76 m (5 ft 9 in)
- Positions: Left midfielder; left-back

Team information
- Current team: GKS Tychy (assistant)

Youth career
- 1999–2001: SC Köln Weiler-Volkhoven
- 2001–2008: 1. FC Köln

Senior career*
Years	Team	Apps	(Gls)
2008–2009	1. FC Köln II	6	(0)
2009–2011	1. FC Köln	0	(0)
2010	→ Carl Zeiss Jena (loan)	14	(3)
2010–2011	→ VfB Stuttgart II (loan)	28	(1)
2011–2012	VfL Osnabrück	14	(0)
2012–2013	Viktoria Köln	12	(0)
2013–2015	MSV Duisburg	53	(8)
2015–2017	Hansa Rostock	67	(1)
2017–2020	Korona Kielce	75	(1)
2020–2021	Cracovia	5	(0)
2021	Cracovia II	2	(0)
2021–2022	PAS Giannina	21	(1)
2022–2023	Asteras Tripolis	21	(1)
2023–2024	Ionikos	18	(1)
2024–2025	Eintracht Hohkeppel	24	(1)
Total		360	(18)

International career
2005–2006	Germany U16	4	(0)
- * Club domestic league appearances and goals

Michael Gardawski (Polish: Michał Gardawski; born 25 September 1990) is a German former professional footballer who played as a left midfielder. He is currently the assistant manager of II liga club GKS Tychy.

== Club career ==
Gardawski began his career with SC Köln Weiler-Volkhovenand in the summer of 1999, before he joined 1. FC Köln's youth-team. In the summer of 2008, he was promoted to the reserve team and played six games, before he was promoted to the Fußball-Bundesliga team in 2009. On 2 February 2010, he left Köln after eight and a half years to sign a half year loan deal with FC Carl Zeiss Jena. He gave his professional debut on 6 February 2010 against FC Erzgebirge Aue.

In July 2010, he was loaned out to VfB Stuttgart II until the end of the season.

On 1 July 2011, Gardawski moved to VfL Osnabrück.

In 2013, he joined MSV Duisburg.

He was signed by Hansa Rostock in 2015.

On 8 July 2017, he signed a contract with Korona Kielce.

On 20 July 2020, he moved to Cracovia.

On 30 July 2021, he signed a contract with PAS Giannina.

== International career ==
Gardawski was a member of the Germany U16 national team.

== Personal life ==
He is the cousin of the former Germany national team player Lukas Sinkiewicz.
