= Panathinaikos F.C. B =

Association football team

Panathinaikos B
- Full name: Panathinaikos Football Club "B"
- Nicknames: Οι Πράσινοι-I Prasini (The Greens); Το Τριφύλλι-To Tryfili (The Shamrock)
- Founded: 2021
- Dissolved: 2024
- Ground: Various
- 2023–24: Super League Greece 2, 11th (relegated)

Panathinaikos Football Club B, known as Panathinaikos B, (Greek: ΠΑΕ Παναθηναϊκός B) was a Greek football club based in Athens, Greece. Founded in 2021, they played as the reserve team of Panathinaikos in the Super League Greece 2.

Panathinaikos B was one of four reserve teams to be given approval from the EPO (Hellenic Football Association) to play in the second division. Panathinaikos B helped young footballers get promoted to the team of Panathinaikos Athens.

The main reason of Panathinaikos B being dissolved is due to the relegation to Gamma Ethniki, the third division of Greek Football, which is an amateur division where reserve teams are not allowed to compete.

== See also ==
- Category:Panathinaikos F.C. B players
