= 2024–25 Olympiacos F.C. season =

Olympiacos
2024–25 season
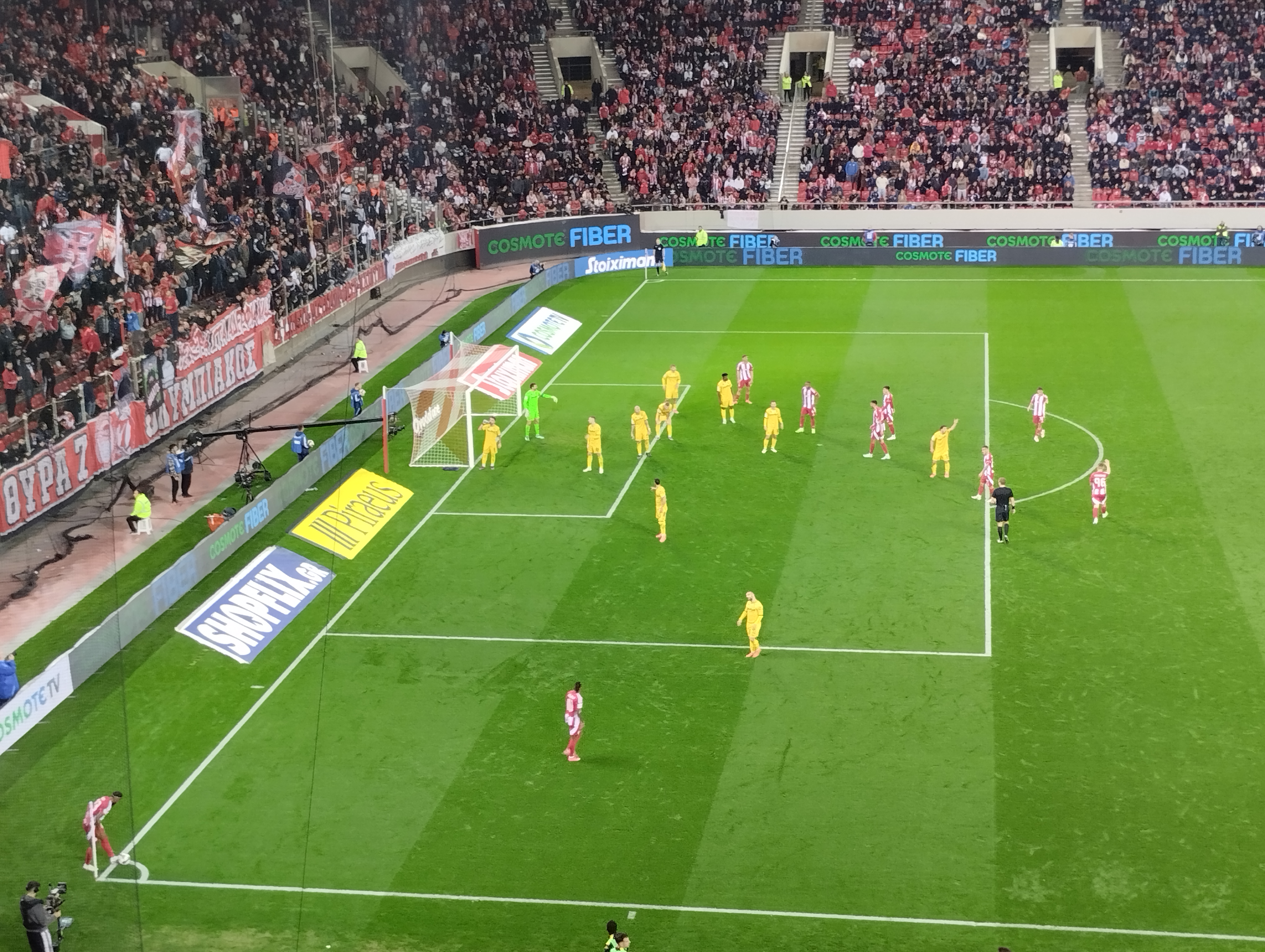
- Olympiacos vs Aris for the Greek Super League
- Owner: Evangelos Marinakis
- President: Evangelos Marinakis
- Manager: José Luis Mendilibar
- Stadium: Karaiskakis Stadium
- Super League Greece: 1st
- Greek Cup: Winners
- Europa League: Round of 16
- Top goalscorer: League: Ayoub El Kaabi (18); All: Ayoub El Kaabi (27)
- Highest home attendance: 33,202
- Lowest home attendance: 17,346
- Average home league attendance: 26,969
- Biggest win: Olympiacos 6–0 AEK Athens
- Biggest defeat: Bodø/Glimt 3–0 Olympiacos
Home colours	Away colours	Third colours
- All statistics correct as of 13 April 2025.

The 2024–25 season was the 100th season in existence of Olympiacos and the club's 66th consecutive season in the top flight of Greek football. In addition to the Greek Super League, Olympiacos participated in the Greek Cup and, as the winner of the 2023–24 UEFA Europa Conference League, the UEFA Europa League. The season covered the period from June 2024 to late May 2025.

== Players ==
=== First team ===
As of 15 February 2025

Squad No.	Name	Nationality	Position(s)	Place of birth	Date of birth (Age)	Previous club
Goalkeepers
1	Alexandros Paschalakis	(Greece)	GK	Athens, Greece	28 July 1989 (35)	(Greece) PAOK
31	Nikolaos Botis	(Greece)	GK	Larisa, Greece	31 March 2004 (20)	(Italy) Inter U19
88	Konstantinos Tzolakis	(Greece)	GK	Chania, Greece	8 November 2002 (22)	(Greece) Olympiacos U19
99	Alexandros Anagnostopoulos	(Greece)	GK	Athens, Greece	18 August 1994 (30)	(Greece) A.E. Kifisia
Defenders
3	Francisco Ortega	(Argentina)	LB	Santa Fe, Argentina	19 March 1999 (25)	(Argentina) Velez Sarsfield
4	Giulian Biancone	(France)	CB	Fréjus, France	31 March 2000 (24)	(England) Nottingham Forest
5	Lorenzo Pirola	(Italy)	CB/LB	Carate Brianza, Italy	20 February 2002 (22)	(Italy) Salernitana
16	David Carmo	(Angola) (Portugal)	CB	Aveiro, Portugal	19 July 1999 (25)	(England) Nottingham Forest
20	Costinha	(Portugal)	RB	Póvoa de Varzim, Portugal	26 March 2000 (24)	(Portugal) Rio Ave
23	Rodinei	(Brazil)	RB/RW	Tatuí, Brazil	29 January 1992 (32)	(Brazil) Flamengo
45	Panagiotis Retsos	(Greece)	CB	Johannesburg, South Africa	9 August 1998 (26)	(Italy) Hellas Verona
70	Bruno Onyemaechi	(Nigeria)	LB	Owerri, Nigeria	3 April 1999 (25)	(Portugal) Boavista
Midfielders
8	Marko Stamenić	(New Zealand) (Serbia)	DM	Wellington, New Zealand	19 February 2002 (22)	(England) Nottingham Forest
10	Gelson Martins	(Cape Verde) (Portugal)	RW	Praia, Cape Verde	11 May 1995 (29)	(France) Monaco
11	Kristoffer Velde	(Norway)	LW	Haugesund, Norway	9 September 1999 (25)	(Poland) Lech Poznań
14	Dani García	(Spain)	DM	Zumarraga, Spain	24 May 1990 (34)	(Spain) Athletic Bilbao
21	André Horta	(Portugal)	CM	Almada, Portugal	7 November 1996 (28)	(Portugal) Braga
22	Chiquinho	(Portugal)	CM/AM	Santo Tirso, Portugal	19 July 1995 (29)	(Portugal) Benfica
32	Santiago Hezze	(Argentina) (Poland)	DM	Buenos Aires, Argentina	22 October 2001 (22)	(Argentina) Huracán
50	Luis Palma	(Honduras)	LW/RW	La Ceiba, Honduras	17 January 2000 (25)	(Scotland) Celtic
64	Antonis Papakanellos	(Greece)	AM	Kleitoria, Greece	11 August 2005 (19)	(Greece) Olympiacos U19
96	Christos Mouzakitis	(Greece)	CM	Corfu, Greece	25 December 2006 (17)	(Greece) Olympiacos U19
97	Yusuf Yazıcı	(Turkey)	AM	Trabzon, Turkey	29 January 1997 (27)	(France) Lille
Forwards
9	Ayoub El Kaabi	(Morocco)	FW	Casablanca, Morocco	25 June 1993 (31)	(Qatar) Al Sadd
17	Roman Yaremchuk	(Ukraine)	FW	Lviv, Ukraine	27 November 1995 (29)	(Belgium) Club Brugge
84	Charalampos Kostoulas	(Greece)	FW	Volos, Greece	30 May 2007 (17)	(Greece) Olympiacos U19

== Backroom staff ==
=== Coaching staff ===
Position	Staff
Sports director	(Serbia) Darko Kovačević
Assistant sports director	(Spain) Jose Ignacio Navarro
Strategic Advisor & Ambassador	(France) Christian Karembeu
Head coach	(Spain) José Luis Mendilibar
Assistant coaches	(Spain) Antonio Jose Ruiz Perez
Assistant coaches	(Spain) Francisco Manuel Rico Castro
Analysts	(Greece) Giannis Vogiatzakis
Analysts	(Greece) Iosif Loukas
Fitness coach	(Greece) Christos Mourikis
Goalkeepers coach	(Greece) Panagiotis Agriogiannis
Rehabilitation trainer	(Greece) Kostas Liougkos
Medical team
Doctor	(Greece) Andreas Piskopakis
Physios	(Greece) Nikos Lykouresis
Physios	(Greece) Stavros Petrocheilos
Physios	(Greece) Konstantinos Koulidis
Physios	(Greece) Panagiotis Karamouzas
Nutritionist	(Portugal) Hernani Araujo Gomes
Scouts
Scouting Coordinator	(Spain) Jaime Cordon
Scouting and Sports Technology	(Greece) Giannis Theodorou
Scout	(Greece) Simos Havos

== Transfers ==
=== In ===
Νο.	Pos.	Nat.	Name	Age	Moving from	Type	Transfer window	Transfer fee	Notes
8	MF	(New Zealand)	Marko Stamenić	22	(England) Nottingham Forest	Loan	Summer	Free	
20	DF	(Portugal)	Costinha	24	(Portugal) Rio Ave	Transfer	Summer	€2.5M	
14	MF	(Spain)	Dani García	34	(Spain) Athletic Bilbao	Transfer	Summer	Free	
99	GK	(Greece)	Alexandros Anagnostopoulos	30	(Greece) A.E. Kifisia	Transfer	Summer	Free	
5	DF	(Italy)	Lorenzo Pirola	22	(Italy) Salernitana	Transfer	Summer	€3M	
11	MF	(Norway)	Kristoffer Velde	25	(Poland) Lech Poznań	Transfer	Summer	€4M	
17	FW	(Ukraine)	Roman Yaremchuk	29	(Belgium) Club Brugge	Transfer	Summer	€2M	
18	MF	(Brazil)	Willian	36	(England) Fulham	Transfer	Summer	Free	
27	MF	(Portugal)	Sérgio Oliveira	32	(Turkey) Galatasaray	Transfer	Summer	Free	
97	MF	(Turkey)	Yusuf Yazıcı	27	(France) Lille	Transfer	Summer	Free	
	DF	(Brazil)	Ramon	23	(Brazil) Cuiabá	End of Loan	Winter	Free	
	DF	(England)	Nelson Abbey	21	(Wales) Swansea City	End of Loan	Winter	Free	
	MF	(Croatia)	Ivan Brnić	23	(Slovenia) Celje	End of Loan	Winter	Free	
	FW	(Spain)	Jefté Betancor	31	(Greece) Panserraikos	Transfer	Winter	€500k	
70	DF	(Nigeria)	Bruno Onyemaechi	26	(Portugal) Boavista	Transfer	Winter	€2.5M	
21	MF	(Portugal)	André Horta	28	(Portugal) Braga	Loan	Winter	Free	Option to buy
50	MF	(Honduras)	Luis Palma	25	(Scotland) Celtic	Loan	Winter	Free	Option to buy

▼ Total Spending: €12M

=== Out ===
Νο.	Pos.	Nat.	Name	Age	Moving to	Type	Transfer window	Transfer fee	Notes
	MF	(Guinea)	Mady Camara	27	(Greece) PAOK	Transfer	Summer	Free	
17	MF	(Cape Verde)	Jovane Cabral	26	(Portugal) Sporting CP	End of Loan	Summer	Free	
29	FW	(Spain)	Fran Navarro	26	(Portugal) Porto	End of Loan	Summer	Free	
27	DF	(England)	Omar Richards	26	(England) Nottingham Forest	End of Loan	Summer	Free	
15	MF	(Greece)	Sotiris Alexandropoulos	22	(Portugal) Sporting CP	End of Loan	Summer	Free	
	DF	(Israel)	Doron Leidner	22	(Switzerland) Zürich	Loan	Summer	Free	Option to buy
	MF	(Argentina)	Maximiliano Lovera	24	(Argentina) Rosario Central	Transfer	Summer	€800k	
	DF	(Senegal)	Ousseynou Ba	28	(Turkey) Başakşehir	Transfer	Summer	€1.2M	
	MF	(Greece)	Marios Vrousai	25	(Portugal) Rio Ave	Transfer	Summer	€500k	
	MF	(Cameroon)	Pierre Kunde	29	(United Arab Emirates) Dibba Al-Hisn	Transfer	Summer	Free	
20	MF	(Portugal)	João Carvalho	27	(Portugal) Estoril Praia	Transfer	Summer	Free	
11	FW	(Morocco)	Youssef El-Arabi	37	(Cyprus) APOEL	Transfer	Summer	Free	
22	FW	(Montenegro)	Stevan Jovetic	34	(Cyprus) Omonia	Transfer	Summer	Free	
18	DF	(Spain)	Quini	34	(Greece) Atromitos	Transfer	Summer	Free	
7	MF	(Greece)	Kostas Fortounis	32	(Saudi Arabia) Al-Khaleej	Transfer	Summer	Free	
8	MF	(Spain)	Vicente Iborra	36	(Spain) Levante	Transfer	Summer	Free	
99	GK	(Greece)	Athanasios Papadoudis	21	(Cyprus) Pafos	Transfer	Summer	Free	
77	MF	(Croatia)	Ivan Brnić	23	(Slovenia) Celje	Loan	Summer	Free	Option to buy
56	MF	(Portugal)	Daniel Podence	27	(England) Wolves	End of Loan	Summer	Free	
5	MF	(Portugal)	André Horta	27	(Portugal) Braga	End of Loan	Summer	Free	
	MF	(Guinea)	Aguibou Camara	23	(Bulgaria) Ludogorets Razgrad	Transfer	Summer	€1.09M	
	MF	(Portugal)	Pêpê	27	(Cyprus) Pafos	Transfer	Summer	€600k	
	DF	(Greece)	Konstantinos Kostoulas	19	(Portugal) Rio Ave	Loan	Summer	Free	U19 team
	DF	(Greece)	Athanasios Koutsogoulas	20	(Greece) Panserraikos	Loan	Summer	Free	U19 team
	MF	(Greece)	Christos Liatsos	21	(Greece) Chania	Loan	Summer	Free	B team
	GK	(Albania)	Anxhelo Sina	20	(Portugal) Rio Ave	Loan	Summer	Free	U19 team
	FW	(Guinea)	Algassime Bah	21	(Cyprus) APOEL	Transfer	Summer	Free	B team
	MF	(Greece)	Christos Karanatsios	20	(Cyprus) APOEL	Transfer	Summer	Free	B team
	MF	(Scotland)	Jordan Holsgrove	25	(Portugal) Estoril Praia	Transfer	Summer	Free	
	DF	(Greece)	Fotis Kitsos	21	(Cyprus) Omonia	Transfer	Summer	Free	
	MF	(Spain)	Pep Biel	28	(United States) Charlotte	Loan	Summer	Free	
6	DF	(England)	Nelson Abbey	21	(Wales) Swansea City	Loan	Summer	Free	
14	DF	(Portugal)	Rúben Vezo	30	(Turkey) Eyüpspor	Loan	Summer	Free	
	MF	(Serbia)	Lazar Ranđelović	26	(Serbia) Vojvodina	Transfer	Summer	Free	
18	MF	(Brazil)	Willian	36	(England) Fulham	Transfer	Winter	Free	
	DF	(England)	Nelson Abbey	21	(Portugal) Rio Ave	Loan	Winter	Free	
67	DF	(Greece)	Isidoros Koutsidis	20	(Greece) Volos	Loan	Winter	Free	
74	DF	(Greece)	Andreas Ntoi	22	(Portugal) Rio Ave	Loan	Winter	Free	
30	DF	(Greece)	Thanasis Androutsos	27	(Greece) OFI	Transfer	Winter	Free	
	FW	(Mali)	Diby Keita	21	(Greece) Egaleo	Loan	Winter	Free	B team
	FW	(Spain)	Jefté Betancor	31	(Greece) Panserraikos	Loan	Winter	Free	
65	DF	(Greece)	Apostolos Apostolopoulos	23	(Greece) Panetolikos	Transfer	Winter	Free	
19	MF	(Greece)	Georgios Masouras	28	(Germany) Bochum	Loan	Winter	Free	
	DF	(Brazil)	Ramon	24	(Brazil) Internacional	Transfer	Winter	€1.5M	
29	MF	(Greece)	Theofanis Bakoulas	20	(Portugal) Rio Ave	Loan	Winter	Free	
	MF	(Croatia)	Ivan Brnić	23	(Turkey) Başakşehir	Transfer	Winter	€1.3M	
27	MF	(Portugal)	Sérgio Oliveira	32	(Brazil) Sport Recife	Transfer	Winter	Free	

▲ Total Income: €6.99M

Net Income: ▼€7.51M

== Friendlies ==
Win Draw Loss

19 July 2024	Ajax	1–0	Olympiacos	Driel, Netherlands
16:00 EEST	Forbs 44'	Report		Stadium: RKSV Driel Stadion

20 July 2024	Mechelen	0–2	Olympiacos	Vlaardingen, Netherlands
16:00 EEST		Report	Mouzakitis 5'; Martins 29'	Stadium: Sportpark 't Nieuwelant

26 July 2024	Al-Qadsiah	2–2	Olympiacos	Tiel, Netherlands
17:30 EEST	Quiñones 35'; Aubameyang 47'	Report	Chiquinho 17'; Al-Ghamdi 90' (o.g.)	Stadium: Sportpark de Lok

27 July 2024	NEC Nijmegen	0–2	Olympiacos	Netherlands
16:30 EEST		Report	Martins 31'; Masouras 36'

2 August 2024	Ternana	0–4	Olympiacos	Terni, Italy
19:30 EEST		Report	Martins 58'; Koutsidis 60'; Velde 76'; Papakanellos 82'	Stadium: Stadio Libero Liberati

3 August 2024	Roma	1–1	Olympiacos	Rieti, Italy
18:00 EEST	Pellegrini 15' (pen.)		Rodinei 22' (pen.)	Stadium: Stadio Centro d'Italia – Manlio Scopigno

8 August 2024	Nottingham Forest	4–3	Olympiacos	Piraeus, Greece
21:00 EEST	Yates 15', 61'; Wood 43'; Elanga 68'		Martins 24', 78'; Velde 89'	Stadium: Karaiskakis Stadium; Referee: Konstantinos Katoikos

10 August 2024	Aris Limassol	2–4	Olympiacos	Limassol, Cyprus
20:30 EEST	Bengtsson 78'; Sawo 84'	Report	Abbey 16'; Velde 21'; Biel 23'; Bakoulas 89'	Stadium: Alphamega Stadium; Referee: Kyriakos Athanasiou (Cyprus)

== Competitions ==
=== Overview ===
Competition	Starting round	Final position	Record							
Competition	Starting round	Final position	Pld	W	D	L	GF	GA	GD	Win %
Super League Greece	Matchday 1	Winners	32	23	6	3	58	22	+36	71.88
Greek Football Cup	Round of 16	Winners	7	4	2	1	12	4	+8	57.14
UEFA Europa League	League Phase	Round of 16	10	5	3	2	11	7	+4	50.00
Total			49	32	11	6	81	33	+48	65.31

Last updated: 17 May 2025
Source: Competitions

=== Super League Greece ===
==== League table ====
Pos	Team	Pld	W	D	L	GF	GA	GD	Pts	Qualification or relegation
1	Olympiacos	26	18	6	2	45	16	+29	60	Qualification for the Championship play-offs
2	AEK Athens	26	16	5	5	44	16	+28	53	Qualification for the Championship play-offs
3	Panathinaikos	26	14	8	4	31	22	+9	50	Qualification for the Championship play-offs
4	PAOK	26	14	4	8	51	26	+25	46	Qualification for the Championship play-offs
5	Aris	26	12	6	8	31	28	+3	42	Qualification for the Europe play-offs

Source: Super League Greece
Rules for classification: 1) Points; 2) Head-to-head points; 3) Head-to-head goal difference; 4) Goal difference; 5) Goals scored; 6) Play-offs (neutral ground).
(Note: Criterion 6 is only used if needed to decide champion, teams for relegation or teams for UEFA competitions).

==== Results summary ====
Overall								Home						Away					
Pld	W	D	L	GF	GA	GD	Pts	W	D	L	GF	GA	GD	W	D	L	GF	GA	GD
26	18	6	2	45	16	+29	60	9	4	0	23	9	+14	9	2	2	22	7	+15

==== Results by matchday ====
Matchday	1	2	3	4	5	6	7	8	9	10	11	12	13	14	15	16	17	18	19	20	21	22	23	24	25	26
Ground	A	H	A	H	A	H	A	H	A	H	A	H	A	H	A	H	A	H	A	H	A	H	A	H	A	H
Result	W	W	W	D	L	W	D	D	L	W	W	W	W	W	D	W	W	W	W	D	W	D	W	W	W	W
Position	2	2	1	2	3	2	3	4	4	4	2	1	1	1	1	1	1	1	1	1	1	1	1	1	1	1

Source: Super League Greece
A = Away; H = Home; W = Win; D = Draw; L = Loss

==== Regular season matches ====
Win Draw Loss

17 August 2024 1	Volos	0–2	Olympiacos	Volos
20:00 EEST	Villafáñez (yellow card) 30' (yellow-red card) 32'; Assehnoun (yellow card) 63'	Report	Rodinei 13'; Biancone (yellow card) 54'; Masouras 73'; Stamenić (yellow card) 84'	Stadium: Panthessaliko Stadium; Attendance: 5.366; Referee: Ioannis Papadopoulos

26 August 2024 2	Olympiacos	2–1	Kallithea	Piraeus
20:30 EEST	Velde 14'; Yaremchuk 79'; Stamenić (yellow card) 85'	Report	Mercati (yellow card) 31'; Uldriķis 60'; Moțoc (yellow card) 80'	Stadium: Karaiskakis Stadium; Attendance: 20.005; Referee: Angelos Evangelou

31 August 2024 3	Lamia	0–3	Olympiacos	Lamia
19:30 EEST	Núñez (yellow card) 32'; Ring (yellow card) 62'	Report	El Kaabi 41', 79'; Martins 81'; Yaremchuk (yellow card) 90'	Stadium: Lamia Stadium; Attendance: 2.828; Referee: Athansios Tzilos

15 September 2024 4	Olympiacos	0–0	Panetolikos	Piraeus
18:30 EEST		Report	Mavrias (yellow card) 31'; Liavas (yellow card) 87'	Stadium: Karaiskakis Stadium; Attendance: 24.253; Referee: Christos Vergetis

21 September 2024 5	Aris	2–1	Olympiacos	Thessaloniki
20:00 EEST	Manu García 3'; Mallo (yellow card) 31'; Vélez (yellow card) 35'	Report	Ntoi (yellow card) 38'; Carmo (yellow card) 57'; Oliveira (yellow card) 75'; Hezze (yellow card) 87'; El Kaabi 90+6'	Stadium: Kleanthis Vikelidis Stadium; Attendance: 7.222; Referee: Luca Pairetto (ITA)

29 September 2024 6	Olympiacos	2–0	Atromitos	Piraeus
18:00 EEST	Apostolopoulos (yellow card) 31'; Rodinei 40' (pen.); Kostoulas (yellow card) 56'; El Kaabi 74'	Report	Brorsson (yellow card) 80'	Stadium: Karaiskakis Stadium; Attendance: 21.573; Referee: Anastasios Papapetrou

6 October 2024 7	Panathinaikos	0–0	Olympiacos	Athens
20:30 EEST	Mladenović (yellow card) 72'; Šporar (yellow card) 88'; Zeca (yellow card) 90+4'	Report	Retsos (yellow card) 20'; García (yellow card) 73'; Hezze (yellow card) 80'; Rodinei (yellow card) 90+3'	Stadium: Olympic Stadium Athens; Attendance: 56.087; Referee: Daniel Siebert (Germany)

20 October 2024 8	Olympiacos	2–2	Levadiakos	Piraeus
16:00 EEST	Chiquinho 4'; Ortega (yellow card) 9'; El Kaabi 21' (pen.)	Report	Papadopoulos (yellow card) 24'; Pedrozo (yellow card) 30'; Ožbolt 45+1' (pen.); Gianniotas 57'; Tsapras (yellow card) 65'; Katris (yellow card) 70'; Zini (yellow card) 87'; Gróf (yellow card) 90+4'	Stadium: Karaiskakis Stadium; Attendance: 22.543; Referee: Stavros Tsimenteridis

27 October 2024 9	Asteras Tripolis	1–0	Olympiacos	Tripoli
18:00 EET	3.756: Kaltsas (yellow card) 10'; Yablonsky 21'; Bartolo (yellow card) 74'; Chouchoumis (yellow card) 88'; Álvarez (yellow card) 90+5'	Report	Masouras (yellow card) 45'	Stadium: Theodoros Kolokotronis Stadium; Referee: Vasilis Fotias

2 November 2024 10	Olympiacos	2–1	Panserraikos	Piraeus
17:00 EET	Velde 12'; El Kaabi 66'	Report	Salazar 63'; Kaptoum (yellow card) 83'; Sofianos (yellow card) 84'	Stadium: Karaiskakis Stadium; Attendance: 20.197; Referee: Alexandros Katsikogiannis

10 November 2024 11	PAOK	2–3	Olympiacos	Thessaloniki
20:30 EET	Bakayoko (yellow card) 32'; Baba 59'; Camara (yellow card) 60'; Carmo 81' (o.g.)	Report	Kostoulas 32'; Carmo (yellow card) 36'; El Kaabi 50'; Martins 69'	Stadium: Toumba Stadium; Attendance: 21.684; Referee: Sven Jablonski (Germany)

24 November 2024 12	Olympiacos	4–1	AEK Athens	Piraeus
20:30 EET	El Kaabi 7' (pen.), 49', 51'; Kostoulas (yellow card) 45'; Mouzakitis (yellow card) 45+5'; Martins 62'; Masouras (yellow card) 77'	Report	Mantalos (yellow card) 38'; Martial 43'; Lamela (red card) 81'	Stadium: Karaiskakis Stadium; Attendance: 32.353; Referee: Harm Osmers (Germany)

1 December 2024 13	OFI	0–2	Olympiacos	Heraklion
17:00 EET	Fountas (yellow card) 10'; Jung (yellow card) 23'	Report	Stamenić (yellow card) 24'; Costinha (yellow card) 26'; Biancone 60' (yellow card) 66'; Chiquinho 88'	Stadium: Theodoros Vardinogiannis Stadium; Attendance: 4.980; Referee: Alexandros Tsakalidis

7 December 2024 14	Olympiacos	3–0	Volos	Piraeus
17:00 EET	El Kaabi 3'; Kostoulas 41'; Martins 66'	Report	Mendieta (yellow card) 26'; Ferrari (yellow card) 33'	Stadium: Karaiskakis Stadium; Attendance: 17.346; Referee: Vasilis Fotias

16 December 2024 15	Athens Kallithea	1–1	Olympiacos	Athens
20:30 EET	Mejías (yellow card) 59'; Giani 90+2' (yellow card) 90+3'	Report	Kostoulas 41'; Martins (yellow card) 82'; Hezze (yellow card) 86'; Rodinei (yellow card) 90+5'	Stadium: Leoforos Alexandras Stadium; Attendance: 238; Referee: Angelos Evangelou

21 December 2024 16	Olympiacos	1–0	Lamia	Piraeus
19:00 EET	Martins 64'	Report	Ring (yellow card) 55'; Athanasakopoulos (yellow card) 59'; Henríquez (yellow card) 70'	Stadium: Karaiskakis Stadium; Attendance: 18.307; Referee: Christos Vergetis

6 January 2025 17	Panetolikos	0–2	Olympiacos	Agrinio
17:00 EET	Pérez (yellow card) 27' (yellow-red card) 51'; Lajud (yellow card) 35'	Report	El Kaabi 45+5' (pen.) (yellow card) 45+5'; Chiquinho 70'	Stadium: Panetolikos Stadium; Attendance: 3.519; Referee: Anastasios Sidiropoulos

11 January 2025 18	Olympiacos	2–1	Aris	Piraeus
20:30 EET	Velde (yellow card) 39'; Kostoulas 50', 90+6'; Mouzakitis (yellow card) 64'	Report	Morón 35'; Montoya (yellow card) 39' (yellow-red card) 72'; Saverio (yellow card) 47'	Stadium: Karaiskakis Stadium; Attendance: 29.532; Referee: Glenn Nyberg (Sweden)

18 January 2025 19	Atromitos	1–2	Olympiacos	Peristeri
15:00 EET	Tsakmakis (yellow card) 19'; Costinha 37' (o.g.); Mansur (yellow card) 50'	Report	Retsos 18' (yellow card) 72'; El Kaabi 23'; Velde (yellow card) 58'	Stadium: Peristeri Stadium; Attendance: 1.792; Referee: Vasilis Fotias

26 January 2025 20	Olympiacos	1–1	Panathinaikos	Piraeus
20:30 EET	Carmo 14' (yellow card) 73'; Hezze (yellow card) 24'; Costinha (red card) 45+2'; Rodinei (yellow card) 75'	Report	Vagiannidis (yellow card) 39'; Mladenović (yellow card) 41'; Đuričić (yellow card) 53'; Ingason (yellow card) 64' (yellow-red card) 90+4'; Ioannidis 74' (pen.) (yellow card) 75'; Arão (yellow card) 85'	Stadium: Karaiskakis Stadium; Attendance: 32.646; Referee: Slavko Vinčić (Slovenia)

2 February 2025 21	Levadiakos	0–1	Olympiacos	Livadeia
16:30 EET	Liagas (yellow card) 7'; Abu Hanna (yellow card) 45+2'; Gianniotas (yellow card) 63'; Jallow (yellow card) 90+1'	Report	García (yellow card) 34'; Mouzakitis 85'	Stadium: Livadeia Municipal Stadium; Attendance: 2.261; Referee: Ioannis Papadopoulos

9 February 2025 22	Olympiacos	1–1	Asteras Tripolis	Piraeus
17:00 EET	Chiquinho 11'; Martins (yellow card) 77'; Velde (yellow card) 80'; Ortega (yellow card) 90+3'	Report	Kaltsas 6'; Álvarez (yellow card) 19'; Bartolo (yellow card) 25'; Macheda (yellow card) 35'; Gioacchini (yellow card) 76'; Papadopoulos (yellow card) 90+5'; Alagbe (yellow card) 90+6'	Stadium: Karaiskakis Stadium; Attendance: 29.600; Referee: Alexandros Tsakalidis

16 February 2025 23	Panserraikos	0–4	Olympiacos	Serres
17:00 EET		Report	El Kaabi 20', 27'; Chiquinho 53'; Yaremchuk (yellow card) 67'; Martins 75'	Stadium: Serres Municipal Stadium; Referee: Alexandros Katsikogiannis

23 February 2025 24	Olympiacos	2–1	PAOK	Piraeus
20:30 EET	Rodinei 6'; Carmo (yellow card) 23'; Kostoulas 31'; Martins (yellow card) 69'	Report	Camara 24'; Konstantelias (yellow card) 33'; Sastre (yellow card) 45+3'	Stadium: Karaiskakis Stadium; Attendance: 32.431; Referee: Tobias Stieler (Germany)

2 March 2025 25	AEK Athens	0–1	Olympiacos	Nea Filadelfeia
20:30 EET	Mantalos (yellow card) 33'; Koïta (yellow card) 73'	Report	Costinha (yellow card) 33'; García (yellow card) 45'; Hezze (yellow card) 58'; Rodinei (yellow card) 89'; Chiquinho 90'	Stadium: Agia Sophia Stadium; Attendance: 30.663; Referee: Sven Jablonski (Germany)

9 March 2025 26	Olympiacos	1–0	OFI	Piraeus
19:00 EET	Rodinei 44' (pen.)	Report	Lewis (red card) 43'; González (yellow card) 79'	Stadium: Karaiskakis Stadium; Attendance: 33.065; Referee: Angelos Evangelou

==== Championship Play-Offs ====
Pos	Team	Pld	W	D	L	GF	GA	GD	Pts	Qualification
1	Olympiacos (C)	32	23	6	3	58	22	+36	75	Qualification for the Champions League league phase (Note: Olympiacos originally qualified for the 2025–26 UEFA Champions League second qualifying round, but since the 2024–25 UEFA Champions League winner (Paris Saint-Germain) already qualified via their domestic league, Olympiacos was promoted to the Champions League league phase as the league champion with the highest club coefficient in the Champions League Champions Path qualifying rounds.)
2	Panathinaikos	32	17	8	7	42	32	+10	59	Qualification for the Champions League second qualifying round
3	PAOK	32	18	4	10	62	37	+25	58	Qualification for the Europa League third qualifying round (Note: Since the 2024–25 Greek Cup winner (Olympiacos) qualified for the Champions League, the Europa League third qualifying round place was passed to the third-placed team.)
4	AEK Athens	32	16	5	11	48	28	+20	53	Qualification for the Conference League second qualifying round

Source: Super League Greece
Rules for classification: 1) Points; 2) Head-to-head points (Regular season and play-off); 3) Head-to-head goal difference (Regular season and play-off); 4) Regular season position.
(C) Champions

==== Results summary ====
Overall								Home						Away					
Pld	W	D	L	GF	GA	GD	Pts	W	D	L	GF	GA	GD	W	D	L	GF	GA	GD
6	5	0	1	13	6	+7	15	3	0	0	9	4	+5	2	0	1	4	2	+2

==== Results by matchday ====
Matchday	1	2	3	4	5	6
Ground	H	A	H	A	H	A
Result	W	L	W	W	W	W
Position	1	1	1	1	1	1

A = Away; H = Home; W = Win; D = Draw; L = Loss

==== Play-off matches ====
Win Draw Loss

30 March 2025 1	Olympiacos	4–2	Panathinaikos	Piraeus
21:00 EEST	Yaremchuk 1', 51'; Chiquinho 16'; Rodinei (yellow card) 76'; Kostoulas 82'	Report	Mladenović 25' (yellow card) 62'; Ioannidis 75' (pen.) (yellow card) 76' (yellow-red card) 90+2'	Stadium: Karaiskakis Stadium; Attendance: 32.500; Referee: Rade Obrenovic (Slovenia)

6 April 2025 2	PAOK	2–1	Olympiacos	Thessaloniki
19:30 EEST	Konstantelias 5'; Ozdoyev (yellow card) 8'; Camara 11' (red card) 74'; Pelkas (yellow card) 42'; Živković (yellow card) 71'	Report	Hezze (yellow card) 2'; Biancone (yellow card) 14'; Yaremchuk (yellow card) 71'	Stadium: Toumba Stadium; Attendance: 20.312; Referee: Sascha Stegemann (Germany)

13 April 2025 3	Olympiacos	1–0	AEK Athens	Piraeus
21:00 EEST	El Kaabi 55'; García (yellow card) 62'; Yaremchuk (yellow card) 90+2'; Paschalakis (red card) 90+6'; Carmo (red card) 90+6'	Report	Koïta (yellow card) 24'; Pilios (yellow card) 69'; Mitoglou (yellow card) 76'; Odubajo (yellow card) 84'; Moukoudi (red card) 90+6'; Martial (red card) 90+6'	Stadium: Karaiskakis Stadium; Attendance: 33.202; Referee: Andrea Colombo (ITA)

27 April 2025 4	AEK Athens	0–2	Olympiacos	Nea Filadelfeia
20:00 EEST	Gaćinović (yellow card) 41'; Mantalos (yellow card) 57'; Pineda (yellow card) 71'; Odubajo (yellow card) 80'	Report	Velde 43'; Pirola (yellow card) 59'; Yaremchuk 74'; Stamenić (yellow card) 87'	Stadium: Agia Sophia Stadium; Attendance: 22.152; Referee: Halil Umut Meler (TUR)

4 May 2025 5	Olympiacos	4–2	PAOK	Piraeus
20:00 EEST	Velde 14'; El Kaabi 30'; Bruno (yellow card) 60'; Chiquinho 81'; Martins 87'	Report	Živković 1', 32'	Stadium: Karaiskakis Stadium; Attendance: 32.550; Referee: Deniz Aytekin (Germany)

11 May 2025 6	Panathinaikos	0–1	Olympiacos	Athens
20:00 EEST	Palmer-Brown (yellow card) 36'; Mladenović (yellow card) 61'; Maksimović (yellow card) 90+1'	Report	García (yellow card) 45'; El Kaabi 60' (pen.); Yaremchuk (yellow card) 81'; Biancone (yellow card) 90+1'	Stadium: Olympic Stadium Athens; Attendance: 16.052; Referee: Andris Treimanis (Latvia)

=== Greek Football Cup ===
Win Draw Loss

==== Round of 16 ====
30 October 2024	Athens Kallithea	0–1	Olympiacos	Athens
21:30 EET	Uldriķis (yellow card) 31'; Diba (yellow card) 48'; Vasilogiannis (yellow card) 71'	Report	Velde 71'	Stadium: Leoforos Alexandras Stadium; Referee: Christos Vergetis

4 December 2024	Olympiacos	1–1 (2–1 agg.)	Athens Kallithea	Piraeus
17:30 EET	Velde 24'; Ntoi (yellow card) 50'; Stamenić (yellow card) 64'	Report	Manthatis 3'; Uldriķis (yellow card) 25'; Marotta (yellow card) 52'	Stadium: Karaiskakis Stadium; Referee: Fotis Polychronis

==== Quarter-finals ====
15 January 2025	Panathinaikos	1–1	Olympiacos	Athens
19:30 EET	Đuričić 51'	Report	Yaremchuk 75'; Ortega (yellow card) 89'	Stadium: Olympic Stadium Athens; Referee: Szymon Marciniak (Poland)

5 February 2025	Olympiacos	1–0 (2–1 agg.)	Panathinaikos	Piraeus
20:30 EET	Chiquinho (yellow card) 30'; Ortega (yellow card) 45'; Carmo (yellow card) 86'; Mouzakitis 90+4'	Report	Maksimović (yellow card) 51'; Vagiannidis (yellow card) 71'	Stadium: Karaiskakis Stadium; Referee: Juan Martínez Munuera (Spain)

==== Semi-finals ====
26 February 2025	Olympiacos	6–0	AEK Athens	Piraeus
20:00 EET	Horta 9', 19'; Bruno (yellow card) 15'; Yaremchuk 22', 53' (yellow card) 55'; Palma 47'; El Kaabi 78'; Hezze (yellow card) 82'	Report	Pineda (yellow card) 43'; Lamela (yellow card) 63'	Stadium: Karaiskakis Stadium; Referee: Felix Brych (Germany)

2 April 2025	AEK Athens	2–0 (2–6 agg.)	Olympiacos	Nea Filadelfeia
19:30 EEST	Frantzdy Pierrot (yellow card) 31'; Carmo 37' (o.g.); Pineda (yellow card) 67'; Odubajo (yellow card) 73'; Mantalos 77'	Report	Palma (yellow card) 41'; Paschalakis (yellow card) 45+2'; Biancone (yellow card) 66'; García (yellow card) 73'	Stadium: Agia Sophia Stadium; Attendance: 14,502; Referee: Rohit Saggi (Norway)

==== Final ====
17 May 2025	OFI	0–2	Olympiacos	Athens
20:00 EEST	Silva (yellow card) 2'; Nuss (yellow card) 68'; Chatzitheodoridis (yellow card) 78'; Lampropoulos (yellow card) 81'	Report	El Kaabi 9'; García (yellow card) 21'; Martins (yellow card) 47'; Yaremchuk (yellow card) 74' (goal) 90+3'	Stadium: Olympic Stadium Athens; Attendance: 55.000; Referee: Szymon Marciniak (Poland)

=== UEFA Europa League ===
==== League phase ====
Pos	Team	Pld	W	D	L	GF	GA	GD	Pts	Qualification
5	(German Football Association) Eintracht Frankfurt	8	5	1	2	14	10	+4	16	Advance to round of 16 (seeded)
6	(French Football Federation) Lyon	8	4	3	1	16	8	+8	15	Advance to round of 16 (seeded)
7	(Hellenic Football Federation) Olympiacos	8	4	3	1	9	3	+6	15	Advance to round of 16 (seeded)
8	(Scottish Football Association) Rangers	8	4	2	2	16	10	+6	14	Advance to round of 16 (seeded)
9	(Norwegian Football Federation) Bodø/Glimt	8	4	2	2	14	11	+3	14	Advance to knockout phase play-offs (seeded)

Source: UEFA
Rules for classification: League phase tiebreakers

Round	1	2	3	4	5	6	7	8
Ground	A	H	A	H	A	H	A	H
Result	L	W	W	D	D	D	W	W
Position	32	15	12	11	14	15	12	7

Source: UEFA
A = Away; H = Home; W = Win; D = Draw; L = Loss

Win Draw Loss Fixtures

26 September 2024 1	Lyon (France)	2–0	(Greece) Olympiacos	Lyon, France
22:00 EEST	Cherki 65'; Benrahma 71'; Tagliafico (yellow card) 71'	Report	García (yellow card) 33'; Hezze (yellow card) 57'; Rodinei (yellow card) 90+3'	Stadium: Parc Olympique Lyonnais; Attendance: 24.412; Referee: Lawrence Visser (Belgium)

3 October 2024 2	Olympiacos (Greece)	3–0	(Portugal) Braga	Piraeus, Greece
19:45 EEST	Retsos (yellow card) 43'; El Kaabi 45', 59'; Hezze 53' (yellow card) 63'; Ortega (yellow card) 88'	Report	Carvalho (yellow card) 45+2'; Ferreira (yellow card) 69'	Stadium: Karaiskakis Stadium; Attendance: 30.301; Referee: Damian Sylwestrzak (Poland)

24 October 2024 3	Malmö FF (Sweden)	0–1	(Greece) Olympiacos	Malmö, Sweden
22:00 EEST	Loukili (yellow card) 46'; Peña (yellow card) 82'	Report	El Kaabi 30' (yellow card) 69'; Carmo (yellow card) 43'; Tzolakis (yellow card) 90'	Stadium: Stadion; Attendance: 19.478; Referee: Simone Sozza (Italy)

7 November 2024 4	Olympiacos (Greece)	1–1	(Scotland) Rangers	Piraeus, Greece
19:45 EET	El Kaabi 56'; Carmo (yellow card) 66'; Kostoulas (yellow card) 88'	Report	Dessers 64'; Jefté (yellow card) 69'; Igamane (yellow card) 87'; Raskin (yellow card) 90+5'	Stadium: Karaiskakis Stadium; Attendance: 31.795; Referee: Sascha Stegemann (Germany)

28 November 2024 5	Steaua București (Romania)	0–0	(Greece) Olympiacos	Bucharest, Romania
22:00 EET	Tănase (yellow card) 40'; Bîrligea (yellow card) 53' (yellow-red card) 67'; Edjouma (yellow card) 90+2'; Târnovanu (yellow card) 90+3'; Popa (yellow card) 90+5'	Report	Retsos (yellow card) 49'	Stadium: Arena Națională; Attendance: 37.152; Referee: Sebastian Gishamer (Austria)

12 December 2024 6	Olympiacos (Greece)	0–0	(Netherlands) Twente	Piraeus, Greece
19:45 EET	Martins (yellow card) 45+3'; Hezze (yellow card) 72'	Report	Regeer (yellow card) 14'; Van Hoorenbeeck (yellow card) 26'	Stadium: Karaiskakis Stadium; Attendance: 31.600; Referee: Jérôme Brisard (France)

23 January 2025 7	Porto (Portugal)	0–1	(Greece) Olympiacos	Porto, Portugal
19:45 EET	Pérez (yellow card) 23'; Samu (yellow card) 53'; Borges (yellow card) 86'	Report	García (yellow card) 59'; El Kaabi 79'	Stadium: Estádio do Dragão; Attendance: 35.357; Referee: Clément Turpin (France)

30 January 2025 8	Olympiacos (Greece)	3–0	(Azerbaijan) Qarabağ	Piraeus, Greece
22:00 EET	El Kaabi 56', 60'; Biancone 89'	Report	Medina (yellow card) 16'; Romão (yellow card) 41'; Zoubir (yellow card) 61'; Vešović (yellow card) 79'; Addai (yellow card) 83'; Qurbanlı (yellow card) 90+3'	Stadium: Karaiskakis Stadium; Attendance: 31.500; Referee: Radu Petrescu (Romania)

==== Round of 16 ====
6 March 2025 First leg	Bodø/Glimt (Norway)	3–0	(Greece) Olympiacos	Bodø, Norway
22:00 EET	Tzolakis 13' (o.g.); Høgh 45', 55'	Report	Biancone (yellow card) 12'	Stadium: Aspmyra Stadion; Attendance: 8.050; Referee: Mykola Balakin (Ukraine)

13 March 2025 Second leg	Olympiacos (Greece)	2–1 (2–4 agg.)	(Norway) Bodø/Glimt	Piraeus, Greece
19:45 EET	Martins (yellow card) 39'; Rodinei (yellow card) 41'; Yaremchuk 53', 65'; Tzolakis (red card) 89'; Biancone (yellow card) 90+4'	Report	Sjøvold (yellow card) 30'; Høgh 36'; Haikin (yellow card) 74'; Evjen (yellow card) 88'	Stadium: Karaiskakis Stadium; Attendance: 31.850; Referee: Felix Zwayer (Germany)

== Squad statistics ==
=== Appearances ===
As of 17 May 2025

No.	Pos.	Nat.	Name	Super League Greece	Greek Cup	UEFA Europa League	Total
No.	Pos.	Nat.	Name	Apps	Apps	Apps	Apps
88	GK	(Greece)	Konstantinos Tzolakis	31	0	10	41
23	DF	(Brazil)	Rodinei	26(3)	5(1)	9(1)	40(5)
9	FW	(Morocco)	Ayoub El Kaabi	25(4)	3(4)	8	36(8)
6	MF	(Portugal)	Chiquinho	25(3)	4(2)	7(1)	36(6)
32	MF	(Argentina)	Santiago Hezze	20(10)	5(1)	8(1)	33(12)
10	MF	(Portugal)	Gelson Martins	22(4)	3(2)	7	32(6)
3	DF	(Argentina)	Francisco Ortega	21(3)	3	8(1)	32(4)
20	DF	(Portugal)	Costinha	17(8)	5	6(2)	28(11)
16	DF	(Angola)	David Carmo	18(5)	3	7(1)	28(6)
5	DF	(Italy)	Lorenzo Pirola	19(2)	3(1)	5(3)	27(6)
14	MF	(Spain)	Dani García	18(9)	3(1)	5(1)	26(11)
45	DF	(Greece)	Panagiotis Retsos	14(3)	4(1)	8(1)	26(5)
96	MF	(Greece)	Christos Mouzakitis	16(7)	2(2)	7(2)	25(11)
11	MF	(Norway)	Kristoffer Velde	17(4)	3(3)	1(5)	21(12)
84	FW	(Greece)	Charalampos Kostoulas	13(9)	3(2)	4(4)	20(15)
4	DF	(France)	Giulian Biancone	12(5)	3(1)	2(2)	17(8)
8	MF	(New Zealand)	Marko Stamenić	8(6)	3(2)	0(4)	11(12)
17	FW	(Ukraine)	Roman Yaremchuk	6(17)	1(2)	2(5)	9(24)
74	DF	(Greece)	Andreas Ntoi	6	1	0(2)	7(2)
1	GK	(Greece)	Alexandros Paschalakis	0	7	0	7
19	MF	(Greece)	Georgios Masouras	2(8)	2(1)	2(2)	6(11)
70	DF	(Nigeria)	Bruno Onyemaechi	4(5)	2(1)	0(2)	6(8)
50	MF	(Honduras)	Luis Palma	3(5)	2	1(1)	6(6)
65	DF	(Greece)	Apostolos Apostolopoulos	3(2)	2	1	6(2)
27	MF	(Portugal)	Sérgio Oliveira	3(6)	2	0(3)	5(9)
21	MF	(Portugal)	André Horta	0(2)	3	1	4(2)
18	MF	(Brazil)	Willian	2(4)	0(1)	1(3)	3(8)
99	GK	(Greece)	Alexandros Anagnostopoulos	1	0	0	1
64	MF	(Greece)	Antonis Papakanellos	0(7)	0(2)	0	0(9)
82	MF	(Greece)	Nikolaos Lolis	0(1)	0	0	0(1)
30	DF	(Greece)	Thanasis Androutsos	0(1)	0	0	0(1)
97	MF	(Turkey)	Yusuf Yazıcı	0(1)	0	0	0(1)

=== Goalscorers & Assists ===
As of 17 May 2025

No.	Pos.	Nat.	Name	Super League Greece		Greek Cup		Europa League		Total		
No.	Pos.	Nat.	Name	G	A	G	A	G	A	Goals	Assists	G+A
9	FW	(Morocco)	Ayoub El Kaabi	18	4	2	3	7	0	27	7	34
17	FW	(Ukraine)	Roman Yaremchuk	4	2	4	1	2	1	10	4	14
6	MF	(Portugal)	Chiquinho	8	4	0	0	0	1	8	5	13
10	MF	(Portugal)	Gelson Martins	7	9	0	1	0	2	7	12	19
84	FW	(Greece)	Charalampos Kostoulas	7	1	0	0	0	1	7	2	9
11	MF	(Norway)	Kristoffer Velde	4	2	2	0	0	0	6	2	8
23	DF	(Brazil)	Rodinei	4	9	0	3	0	1	4	13	17
96	MF	(Greece)	Christos Mouzakitis	1	1	1	0	0	3	2	4	6
4	DF	(France)	Giulian Biancone	1	1	0	0	1	0	2	1	3
21	MF	(Portugal)	André Horta	0	0	2	1	0	0	2	1	3
50	MF	(Honduras)	Luis Palma	0	0	1	1	0	0	1	1	2
45	DF	(Greece)	Panagiotis Retsos	1	1	0	0	0	0	1	1	2
32	MF	(Argentina)	Santiago Hezze	0	1	0	0	1	0	1	1	2
16	DF	(Angola)	David Carmo	1	0	0	0	0	0	1	0	1
19	MF	(Greece)	Georgios Masouras	1	0	0	0	0	0	1	0	1
20	DF	(Portugal)	Costinha	0	3	0	0	0	0	0	3	3
14	MF	(Spain)	Dani García	0	0	0	1	0	1	0	2	2
3	DF	(Argentina)	Francisco Ortega	0	1	0	0	0	0	0	1	1
70	DF	(Nigeria)	Bruno Onyemaechi	0	1	0	0	0	0	0	1	1
18	MF	(Brazil)	Willian	0	1	0	0	0	0	0	1	1

Own Goals: 1

== Individual awards ==
Name	Pos.	Award
(Morocco) Ayoub El Kaabi	Forward	UEFA Europa League Top scorer; Super League Greece Best Foreign Player; Super League Greece Team of the Season
(Greece) Konstantinos Tzolakis	Goalkeeper	Super League Greece Player of the Season; Super League Greece Goalkeeper of the Season; Super League Greece Team of the Season; Olympiacos Player of the Season; Super League Player of the Month January 2025
(Greece) Christos Mouzakitis	Central Midfielder	Golden Boy Web Award; Super League Greece Team of the Season; Super League Greece Young Player of the Season
(Greece) Panagiotis Retsos	Centre-back	Super League Greece Team of the Season
(Portugal) Gelson Martins	Winger	Super League Greece Team of the Season
(Greece) Charalampos Kostoulas	Forward	Super League Greece Player of the Month December 2024
