= 2024 UEFA Europa Conference League final =

- Final's official match programme
- Event: 2023–24 UEFA Europa Conference League
Olympiacos	Fiorentina
(Greece)	(Italy)
1	0
- After extra time
- Date: 29 May 2024
- Venue: Agia Sophia Stadium, Athens
- Man of the Match: Ayoub El Kaabi (Olympiacos)
- Referee: Artur Soares Dias (Portugal)
- Attendance: 26,842
- Weather: Partly cloudy night 21 °C (70 °F); 51% humidity

The 2024 UEFA Europa Conference League final was the final match of the 2023–24 UEFA Europa Conference League, the third season of Europe's tertiary club football tournament organised by UEFA. It was held at the Agia Sophia Stadium in Athens, Greece, on 29 May 2024, between Greek club Olympiacos and Italian club Fiorentina.

Olympiacos won the match 1–0 after extra time courtesy of a header by Ayoub El Kaabi for their first European title, also becoming the first Greek club to win a European trophy. As winners, they qualified for the league phase of the 2024–25 UEFA Europa League. Meanwhile, Fiorentina lost their second consecutive final, becoming the first team to lose European finals in consecutive seasons since Benfica in the 2013 and 2014 Europa League finals.

== Background ==
This was Olympiacos' first European final and only the second to feature a Greek team, the other coming in the 1971 European Cup final which Panathinaikos lost to Ajax. Five weeks prior to this final, Olympiacos' under-19 team had won the 2023–24 UEFA Youth League, the first UEFA competition win for a Greek club at any level. Fiorentina became the first club to play in two UEFA Europa Conference League finals and the first to contest them consecutively. Fiorentina were looking to win their first major trophy since winning the 2000–01 Coppa Italia, and their first European title since winning the 1960–61 European Cup Winners' Cup.

Both managers were seeking their first Europa Conference League title, with Olympiacos' José Luis Mendilibar the more experienced in winning a European trophy, having won the previous year's Europa League final with Sevilla. With a win, Mendilibar would become the first manager to win two different major European trophies in consecutive seasons since fellow Spaniard Rafael Benítez won the 2003–04 UEFA Cup with Valencia and the 2004–05 UEFA Champions League with Liverpool, the sixth manager ever to achieve that, and the second to do it with different clubs. (Note: They are Nereo Rocco (1967–68 European Cup Winners' Cup and 1968–69 European Cup, both with Milan), Bob Paisley (1975–76 UEFA Cup and 1976–77 European Cup, both with Liverpool), Giovanni Trapattoni (1983–84 European Cup Winners' Cup and 1984–85 European Cup, both with Juventus), José Mourinho (2002–03 UEFA Cup and 2003–04 UEFA Champions League, both with Porto), and Benítez.)

=== Previous finals ===
Team	Previous final appearances (bold indicates winners)
(Greece) Olympiacos	None
(Italy) Fiorentina	1 (2023)

== Venue ==
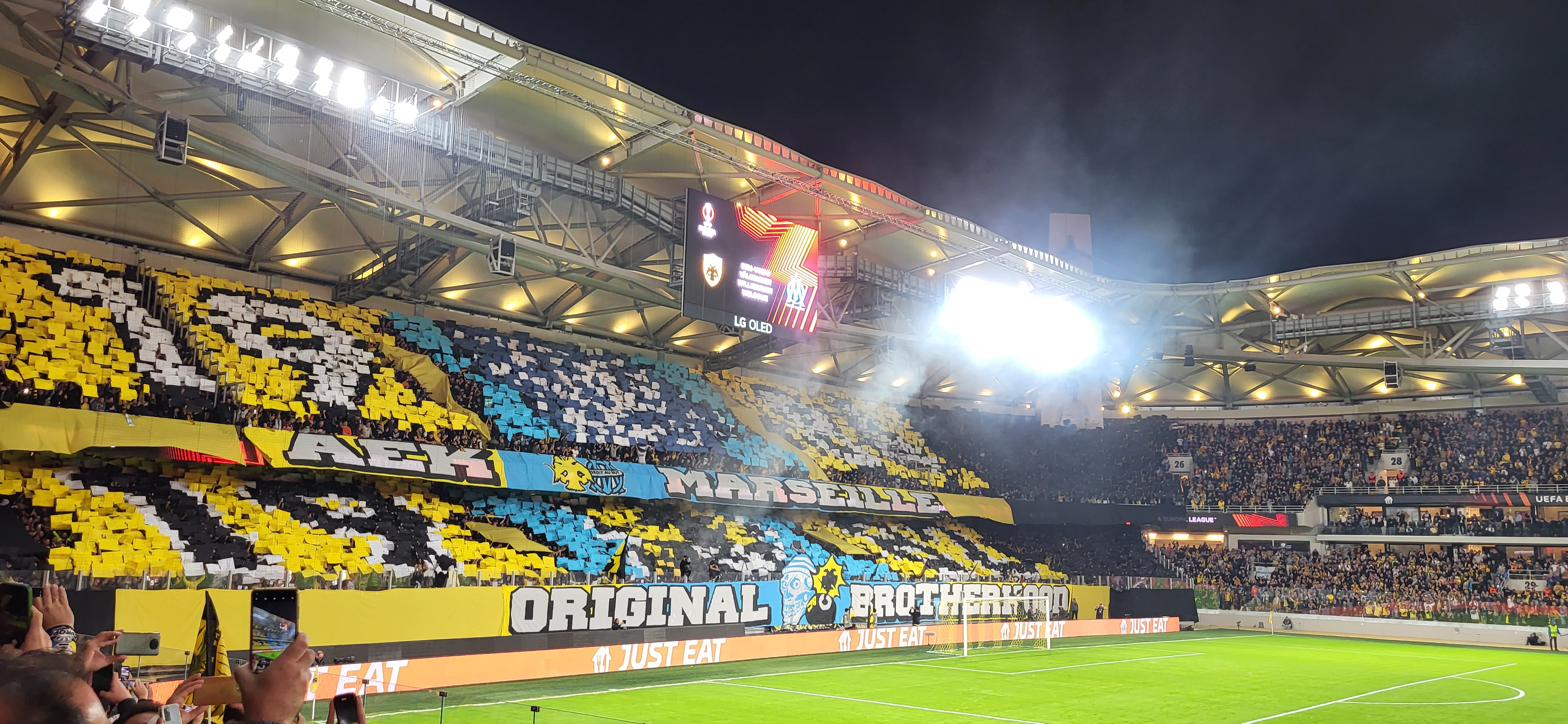
The Agia Sophia Stadium in Athens hosted the final.

The Agia Sophia Stadium in Athens, known as the OPAP Arena for sponsorship reasons, is the home of AEK Athens, one of Olympiacos' local rivals. The stadium opened in September 2022, and had a capacity of 31,100. The match was the eighth single-leg UEFA club final to be played in Greece, having hosted three European Cup/Champions League finals (in 1983, 1994 and 2007), three Cup Winners' Cup finals (in 1971, 1973 and 1987) and the 2023 UEFA Super Cup.

=== Host selection ===
On 21 June 2022, UEFA opened the bidding process for the final, which was held in parallel with that of the 2025 final. Interested bidders could bid for either one or both of the finals. The proposed venues had to include natural grass and be ranked as a UEFA category four stadium, with a gross capacity of between 30,000 and 50,000 preferred. The bidding timeline was as follows:

- 21 June 2022: Applications formally invited
- 31 August 2022: Closing date for registering intention to bid
- 7 September 2022: Bid requirements made available to bidders
- 3 November 2022: Submission of preliminary bid dossier
- 23 February 2023: Submission of final bid dossier
- 28 June 2023: Appointment of host

The UEFA Executive Committee appointed the Agia Sophia Stadium as the host during their meeting in Nyon, Switzerland, on 28 June 2023. As the stadium was new and had never been operated by the club for international competitions, it was subject to an observation period until November 2023 for matches played in UEFA club competitions and UEFA Euro 2024 qualifying. A date of December 2023 was set for official confirmation that the venue met the requirements.

== Route to the final ==
Note: In all results below, the score of the finalist is given first (H: home; A: away).

(Greece) Olympiacos				Round	(Italy) Fiorentina			
Europa League					Europa Conference League			
Opponent	Agg.	1st leg	2nd leg	Qualifying phase (EL, ECL)	Opponent	Agg.	1st leg	2nd leg
(Belgium) Genk	2–1	1–0 (H)	1–1 (A)	Third qualifying round	Bye			
(Serbia) Čukarički	6–1	3–1 (H)	3–0 (A)	Play-off round	(Austria) Rapid Wien	2–1	0–1 (A)	2–0 (H)
Opponent	Result			Group stage (EL, ECL)	Opponent	Result		
(Germany) SC Freiburg	2–3 (H)			Matchday 1	(Belgium) Genk	2–2 (A)		
(Serbia) TSC	2–2 (A)			Matchday 2	(Hungary) Ferencváros	2–2 (H)		
(England) West Ham United	2–1 (H)			Matchday 3	(Serbia) Čukarički	6–0 (H)		
(England) West Ham United	0–1 (A)			Matchday 4	(Serbia) Čukarički	1–0 (A)		
(Germany) SC Freiburg	0–5 (A)			Matchday 5	(Belgium) Genk	2–1 (H)		
(Serbia) TSC	5–2 (H)			Matchday 6	(Hungary) Ferencváros	1–1 (A)		
Group A third place: Pos / Team / Pld / Pts; 1 / (England) West Ham United / 6 / 15; 2 / (Germany) SC Freiburg / 6 / 12; 3 / (Greece) Olympiacos / 6 / 7; 4 / (Serbia) TSC / 6 / 1; Source: UEFA				Final standings	Group F winners: Pos / Team / Pld / Pts; 1 / (Italy) Fiorentina / 6 / 12; 2 / (Hungary) Ferencváros / 6 / 10; 3 / (Belgium) Genk / 6 / 9; 4 / (Serbia) Čukarički / 6 / 0; Source: UEFA			
Europa Conference League					Group F winners: Pos / Team / Pld / Pts; 1 / (Italy) Fiorentina / 6 / 12; 2 / (Hungary) Ferencváros / 6 / 10; 3 / (Belgium) Genk / 6 / 9; 4 / (Serbia) Čukarički / 6 / 0; Source: UEFA			
Opponent	Agg.	1st leg	2nd leg	Knockout phase	Opponent	Agg.	1st leg	2nd leg
(Hungary) Ferencváros	2–0	1–0 (H)	1–0 (A)	Knockout round play-offs	Bye			
(Israel) Maccabi Tel Aviv	7–5	1–4 (H)	6–1 (a.e.t.) (A)	Round of 16	(Israel) Maccabi Haifa	5–4	4–3 (A)	1–1 (H)
(Turkey) Fenerbahçe	3–3 (3–2 p)	3–2 (H)	0–1 (a.e.t.) (A)	Quarter-finals	(Czech Republic) Viktoria Plzeň	2–0	0–0 (A)	2–0 (a.e.t.) (H)
(England) Aston Villa	6–2	4–2 (A)	2–0 (H)	Semi-finals	(Belgium) Club Brugge	4–3	3–2 (H)	1–1 (A)

== Pre-match ==
=== Identity ===
The original identity of the 2024 UEFA Europa Conference League final was unveiled at the group stage draw on 1 September 2023.

=== Ticketing ===
The stadium has a capacity of 32,500, and 27,100 were made available of which 21,000 were on sale to the general public. Each club in the final received an allocation of 9,000 tickets each.

== Match ==
=== Summary ===
After a goalless ninety minutes, the match went into extra-time. In the 116th minute Olympiacos went in front when Ayoub El Kaabi got the only goal of the match when he stooped low to head the ball into the left corner of the net after a cross from the left by Santiago Hezze. After a lengthy VAR check the goal was eventually awarded and Olympiacos went on to win their first European trophy.

=== Details ===
The "home" team (for administrative purposes) was determined by an additional draw held after the quarter-final and semi-final draws.

29 May 2024
22:00 UTC+3

Olympiacos (Greece)	1–0 (a.e.t.)	(Italy) Fiorentina
El Kaabi 116'	Report

Agia Sophia Stadium, Athens
Attendance: 26,842
Referee: Artur Soares Dias (Portugal)

Olympiacos	Fiorentina

GK	88	(Greece) Konstantinos Tzolakis
RB	23	(Brazil) Rodinei
CB	45	(Greece) Panagiotis Retsos
CB	16	(Angola) David Carmo
LB	3	(Argentina) Francisco Ortega		(substituted off) 91'
CM	32	(Argentina) Santiago Hezze
CM	8	(Spain) Vicente Iborra
RW	56	(Portugal) Daniel Podence	(yellow card) 28'	(substituted off) 106'
AM	6	(Portugal) Chiquinho		(substituted off) 77'
LW	7	(Greece) Kostas Fortounis (c)		(substituted off) 73'
CF	9	(Morocco) Ayoub El Kaabi	(yellow card) 117'	(substituted off) 120+2'
Substitutes:
GK	1	(Greece) Alexandros Paschalakis	(yellow card) 95'
GK	99	(Greece) Athanasios Papadoudis
DF	18	(Spain) Quini		(substituted on) 91'
DF	27	(England) Omar Richards
DF	65	(Greece) Apostolos Apostolopoulos
DF	74	(Greece) Andreas Ntoi
MF	5	(Portugal) André Horta		(substituted on) 77'
MF	15	(Greece) Sotiris Alexandropoulos
MF	19	(Greece) Georgios Masouras		(substituted on) 106'
MF	20	(Portugal) João Carvalho
FW	11	(Morocco) Youssef El-Arabi		(substituted on) 120+2'
FW	22	(Montenegro) Stevan Jovetić	(yellow card) 94'	(substituted on) 73'
Manager:
(Spain) José Luis Mendilibar

GK	1	(Italy) Pietro Terracciano
RB	2	(Brazil) Dodô
CB	4	(Serbia) Nikola Milenković
CB	28	(Argentina) Lucas Martínez Quarta	(yellow card) 42'
LB	3	(Italy) Cristiano Biraghi (c)	(yellow card) 99'	(substituted off) 106'
CM	6	(Brazil) Arthur		(substituted off) 74'
CM	38	(Italy) Rolando Mandragora
RW	10	(Argentina) Nicolás González		(substituted off) 106'
AM	5	(Italy) Giacomo Bonaventura		(substituted off) 82'
LW	99	(Ivory Coast) Christian Kouamé	(yellow card) 79'	(substituted off) 82'
CF	20	(Italy) Andrea Belotti		(substituted off) 59'
Substitutes:
GK	53	(Denmark) Oliver Christensen
DF	16	(Italy) Luca Ranieri		(substituted on) 106'
DF	22	(Italy) Davide Faraoni
DF	33	(Italy) Michael Kayode
DF	65	(Italy) Fabiano Parisi
MF	8	(France) Maxime Lopez
MF	19	(Argentina) Gino Infantino
MF	32	(Ghana) Alfred Duncan		(substituted on) 74'
MF	72	(Czech Republic) Antonín Barák		(substituted on) 82'
FW	9	(Argentina) Lucas Beltrán		(substituted on) 106'
FW	11	(France) Jonathan Ikoné		(substituted on) 82'
FW	18	(Angola) M'Bala Nzola		(substituted on) 59'
Manager:
(Italy) Vincenzo Italiano

Man of the Match:
Ayoub El Kaabi (Olympiacos)

Assistant referees:
Paulo Soares (Portugal)
Pedro Ribeiro (Portugal)
Fourth official:
Glenn Nyberg (Sweden)
Reserve assistant referee:
Mahbod Beigi (Sweden)
Video assistant referee:
Tiago Martins (Portugal)
Assistant video assistant referee:
Christian Dingert (Germany)
Support video assistant referee:
Marco Fritz (Germany)

Match rules

- 90 minutes
- 30 minutes of extra time if necessary
- Penalty shoot-out if scores still level
- Maximum of twelve named substitutes
- Maximum of five substitutions, with a sixth allowed in extra time
- Maximum of three substitution opportunities, with a fourth allowed in extra time

=== Statistics ===
First half
Statistic	Olympiacos	Fiorentina
Goals scored	0	0
Total shots	2	9
Shots on target	2	2
Saves	2	2
Ball possession	49%	51%
Corner kicks	2	2
Fouls committed	6	5
Offsides	2	1
Yellow cards	1	1
Red cards	0	0

Second half
Statistic	Olympiacos	Fiorentina
Goals scored	0	0
Total shots	1	3
Shots on target	0	1
Saves	1	0
Ball possession	49%	51%
Corner kicks	1	3
Fouls committed	4	9
Offsides	1	2
Yellow cards	0	1
Red cards	0	0

Extra time
Statistic	Olympiacos	Fiorentina
Goals scored	1	0
Total shots	3	5
Shots on target	2	1
Saves	1	1
Ball possession	41%	59%
Corner kicks	2	1
Fouls committed	0	3
Offsides	1	0
Yellow cards	3	1
Red cards	0	0

Overall
Statistic	Olympiacos	Fiorentina
Goals scored	1	0
Total shots	6	17
Shots on target	4	4
Saves	4	3
Ball possession	47%	53%
Corner kicks	5	6
Fouls committed	10	17
Offsides	4	3
Yellow cards	4	3
Red cards	0	0

== Post-match ==
After the match Prime Minister of Greece Kyriakos Mitsotakis made a post on social media platform X, describing Olympiacos as "a true legend". This win caused a big celebration with several thousand Olympiacos fans gathered in Piraeus, Greece.

== See also ==
- 2024 UEFA Champions League final
- 2024 UEFA Europa League final
- 2024 UEFA Women's Champions League final
- 2024 UEFA Super Cup
- Olympiacos F.C. in European football
- ACF Fiorentina in European football
- 2023–24 ACF Fiorentina season
- 2023–24 Olympiacos F.C. season
