= David Carmo =

Footballer (born 1999)

Personal information
- Full name: David Mota Veiga Teixeira do Carmo
- Date of birth: 19 July 1999 (age 27)
- Place of birth: Aveiro, Portugal
- Height: 1.96 m (6 ft 5 in)
- Position: Centre-back

Team information
- Current team: Olympiacos
- Number: 6

Youth career
- 2008–2009: Beira-Mar
- 2009–2011: Casa do Benfica Estarreja
- 2011–2013: Benfica
- 2013: Anadia
- 2014: Beira-Mar
- 2014–2015: Sanjoanense
- 2015–2018: Braga

Senior career*
Years	Team	Apps	(Gls)
2018–2022	Braga B	41	(2)
2020–2022	Braga	42	(0)
2022–2024	Porto B	6	(0)
2022–2024	Porto	16	(0)
2024	→ Olympiacos (loan)	11	(0)
2024–2026	Nottingham Forest	0	(0)
2024–2025	→ Olympiacos (loan)	23	(1)
2025–2026	→ Oviedo (loan)	22	(1)
2026–	Olympiacos	3	(1)

International career^{‡}
2018	Portugal U19	10	(0)
2018–2019	Portugal U20	7	(0)
2024–	Angola	18	(0)
Medal record
Men's football
Representing Portugal
UEFA European Under-19 Championship
Winner	Finland 2018
- * Club domestic league appearances and goals as of 18:52, 20 September 2026 (UTC) ‡ National team caps and goals as of 22:00, 25 September 2026 (UTC)

David Mota Veiga Teixeira do Carmo (Portuguese pronunciation: [dɐˈvið ˈkaɾmu]; born 19 July 1999) is a professional footballer who plays as a centre-back for Super League Greece club Olympiacos and the Angola national team.

He began his career at Braga, winning the Taça de Portugal in 2021 and signing a year later with Porto for €20 million plus €2.5 million in add-ons, the highest transfer fee between two Portuguese clubs. He then spent one and a half seasons on loan to Olympiacos, his second immediately after joining Nottingham Forest in August 2024, notably claiming a double in 2024–25.

Born in Portugal, Carmo represented Angola at international level.

== Club career ==
=== Braga ===
Born in Aveiro of Angolan descent, Carmo began playing for hometown club Beira-Mar and was in Benfica's academy from 2011 to 2013. Unable to match the physical strength of his teammates, he returned to his home district and joined modest Sanjoanense.

Carmo joined Braga's youth academy at the age of 16. On 18 August 2018 he made his senior debut in the LigaPro with their reserves, playing the entire 1–0 home loss against Estoril, and made a further 26 appearances as the season ended in relegation.

Carmo had his first call-up to the first team on 17 May 2019, remaining unused in a 2–0 Primeira Liga home win over Portimonense in the last matchday. He appeared in his first top-flight match on 17 January 2020, replacing Raul Silva at half-time of the away fixture with Porto and conceding a penalty shortly after which Tiquinho Soares failed to convert with the score at 1–0 for the visiting team (Matheus had previously saved one from Alex Telles), in an eventual 2–1 victory.

On 25 October 2020, in a 1–0 local derby win at Vitória de Guimarães, Carmo was sent off for a foul on Marcus Edwards; this prompted a melée in which one more player from each team was also shown a red card. He and teammate Fransérgio were suspended for three games, while opponent Jorge Fernandes was banned for two.

On 12 November 2020, Carmo extended his contract for two more years to 2025. He nearly joined Liverpool on a €4 million loan with an obligation to buy in the next winter transfer window, but manager Carlos Carvalhal convinced him to stay as the team also would not have been able to find a suitable replacement in that timeframe. On 10 February 2021, in the second half of a 1–1 home draw against Porto in the first leg of the semi-finals of the Taça de Portugal, he broke his leg following a collision with Luis Díaz, who was sent off after a video assistant referee review.

Carmo returned to action with the first team 375 days later, playing the entire 1–0 away defeat of Tondela. He scored his first goal for the club on 14 April away to Rangers in the quarter-finals of the UEFA Europa League with an 83rd-minute header, being unable to prevent elimination after losing 3–1 away and 3–2 on aggregate; for his efforts, he was named the domestic league's defender of the month in a run of six consecutive wins, including five matches without conceding a goal.

On 15 May 2022, Carmo was sent off at the end of a 3–2 loss at local rivals Famalicão for retaliating when struck by Riccieli. He was suspended for two games and the Brazilian for three, while also being fined €867 and €561 respectively.

=== Porto ===
On 5 July 2022, Carmo signed a five-year contract with Porto for €20 million plus €2.5 million in add-ons, which was the highest transfer fee paid between Portuguese clubs; the previous record was Rafa Silva's 2016 move from Braga to Benfica for €16.4 million. Owing to his sending-off for Braga, he missed the team's victory over Tondela in the Supertaça Cândido de Oliveira, as did a quartet of teammates given suspensions for insulting Benfica; he made his debut for the reserves on 7 August as the second-tier season began with a 1–0 home loss to Covilhã.

Carmo made his first-team debut on 3 September, winning all aerial duels in a 2–0 win at Gil Vicente. Four days later, on his maiden appearance in the UEFA Champions League, he played in a 2–1 group-stage loss at Atlético Madrid. After giving away a penalty in that competition against Club Brugge that manager Sérgio Conceição deemed unnecessary and childish, he was frequently kept out of the matchday squads; his 106-day exile ended on 12 February 2023, as a last-minute substitute in a 2–1 win at Sporting CP.

At the beginning of the 2023–24 season, Carmo played the full 90 minutes in a 1–0 away victory over Estrela da Amadora, earning praise from Conceição who, in the post-match press conference, named him and Pepe as the best players on the field. In December, however, he was relegated to Porto B reportedly due to "inappropriate behavior within the work group".

=== Olympiacos ===
On 26 January 2024, Carmo joined Super League Greece club Olympiacos until the end of the campaign; according to reports, the deal involved a €600,000 loan fee and an optional buying clause of €18 million. He made nine complete appearances in their victorious run in the UEFA Conference League, including 120 minutes of the 1–0 victory against Fiorentina in the final.

=== Nottingham Forest ===
Carmo agreed to a five-year deal at Premier League's Nottingham Forest on 25 August 2024. He was immediately loaned to Olympiacos until June 2025.

On 29 August 2025, Carmo was loaned to La Liga side Real Oviedo for one year.

=== Third Olympiacos spell ===
Carmo returned to Olympiacos in June 2026, signing a three-year contract.

== International career ==
=== Portugal ===
Carmo represented Portugal at under-19 and under-20 level. He started the 2018 UEFA European Under-19 Championship on the bench, but after Diogo Queirós was sent off against Italy in the group stage he never lost his place again, making four appearances for the champions in Finland.

Carmo was called up to the senior side by manager Fernando Santos on 20 May 2022, for the 2022–23 UEFA Nations League matches against Spain, Switzerland and the Czech Republic. In October, he was named in a preliminary 55-man squad for the 2022 FIFA World Cup in Qatar.

=== Angola ===
On 12 March 2024, Carmo was called up by the Angola national team. He made his debut ten days later in a friendly against Morocco, his 72nd-minute own goal being the only of the game in Agadir.

Carmo was included in the squad for the 2025 Africa Cup of Nations to be held in Morocco.

== Style of play ==
Carmo is predominantly left-footed, and his size is a significant factor in his defensive style and ability. He is a front-foot defender that engages in both ground and aerial duels, seeking to cut out danger at source by stepping in to intercept passes or muscle attackers off the ball. His physicality enables him to be a dominant presence, especially in the air.

Carmo also possesses quality in possession. His long-range distribution is one of the main features of his skillset, as he is adept at pinging switch passes to the opposite wing or driving a pass down the channel.

== Career statistics ==
As of match played 23 May 2026

Appearances and goals by club, season and competition
Club	Season	League			National cup (Note: Includes Taça de Portugal, Greek Football Cup)		League cup (Note: Includes Taça da Liga)		Continental		Other		Total	
Club	Season	Division	Apps	Goals	Apps	Goals	Apps	Goals	Apps	Goals	Apps	Goals	Apps	Goals
Braga B	2018–19	LigaPro	27	0	—		—		—		—		27	0
Braga B	2019–20	Campeonato de Portugal	13	2	—		—		—		—		13	2
Braga B	2021–22	Liga 3	1	0	—		—		—		—		1	0
Braga B	Total		41	2	—		—		—		—		41	2
Braga	2019–20	Primeira Liga	18	0	—		—		1 (Note: Appearances in UEFA Europa League)	0	—		19	0
Braga	2020–21	Primeira Liga	12	0	2	0	2	0	5	0	—		21	0
Braga	2021–22	Primeira Liga	12	0	—		—		5	1	—		17	1
Braga	Total		42	0	2	0	2	0	11	1	—		57	1
Porto B	2022–23	Liga Portugal 2	3	0	—		—		—		—		3	0
Porto B	2023–24	Liga Portugal 2	3	0	—		—		—		—		3	0
Porto B	Total		6	0	—		—		—		—		6	0
Porto	2022–23	Primeira Liga	9	0	1	0	0	0	5 (Note: Appearances in UEFA Champions League)	0	—		15	0
Porto	2023–24	Primeira Liga	7	0	0	0	1	0	4	0	—		12	0
Porto	2024–25	Primeira Liga	0	0	0	0	0	0	0	0	1 (Note: Appearance in Supertaça Cândido de Oliveira)	0	1	0
Porto	Total		16	0	1	0	1	0	9	0	1	0	28	0
Olympiacos (loan)	2023–24	Super League Greece	11	0	—		—		9 (Note: Appearances in UEFA Conference League)	0	—		20	0
Olympiacos (loan)	2024–25	Super League Greece	23	1	3	0	—		8	0	—		34	1
Real Oviedo (loan)	2025–26	La Liga	22	1	0	0	—		—		—		22	1
Olympiacos	2026–27	Super League Greece	0	0	0	0	—		0	0	—		0	0
Career total			161	4	6	0	3	0	37	1	1	0	208	5

== Honours ==
Braga

- Taça de Portugal: 2020–21

Porto

- Taça de Portugal: 2022–23
- Supertaça Cândido de Oliveira: 2024

Olympiacos

- Super League Greece: 2024–25
- Greek Football Cup: 2024–25
- UEFA Conference League: 2023–24

Portugal U19

- UEFA European Under-19 Championship: 2018

Individual

- Primeira Liga Defender of the Month: April 2022
- UEFA Conference League Team of the Season: 2023–24
