= Christos Mouzakitis =

Greek footballer (born 2006)

Personal information
- Date of birth: 25 December 2006 (age 19)
- Place of birth: Athens, Greece
- Height: 1.78 m (5 ft 10 in)
- Position: Central midfielder

Team information
- Current team: Hull City
- Number: 36

Youth career
- 2011–2015: Posidonas Iraklio
- 2015–2016: AEK Athens
- 2016–2024: Olympiacos

Senior career*
Years	Team	Apps	(Gls)
2023–2024	Olympiacos B	16	(0)
2024–2026	Olympiacos	50	(2)
2026–	Hull City	1	(0)

International career^{‡}
2022	Greece U16	3	(0)
2022	Greece U17	5	(1)
2023	Greece U19	3	(0)
2024–	Greece U21	4	(0)
2024–	Greece	12	(0)
- * Club domestic league appearances and goals as of 8 November 2026 ‡ National team caps and goals as of 12 November 2026

Christos Mouzakitis (Greek: Χρήστος Μουζακίτης; born 25 December 2006) is a Greek professional footballer who plays as a midfielder for Premier League club Hull City and the Greece national team.

== Early life ==
Mouzakitis was born in 2006 in Athens. His family originates from the island of Corfu. He joined the youth academy of Greek side Olympiacos at seven-eight years old.

== Club career ==
=== Olympiacos ===
Mouzakitis started his career with Greek side Olympiacos B. On 12 April 2023, he debuted for the club during a 3–0 win over Episkopi. Mouzakitis is the big winner in the international vote of the Italian newspaper Tuttosport for the European Golden Boy Web 2025. The Golden Boy is an award established by Tuttosport that is given by sports journalists to a young male footballer playing in Europe perceived to have been the most impressive during a calendar year (two halves to two separate seasons). All nominees must be under the age of 21 and play in a European nation's top tier. Apart from the main award, an additional one, "Golden Boy Web", is decided by online users.

=== Hull City ===
On 1 September 2026, Mouzakitis signed a five-year contract with newly promoted Premier League club Hull City. The transfer fee was reportedly €15 million in addition to bonuses.

== International career ==
Mouzakitis made his debut for Greece national team on 17 November 2024 in a Nations League game against Finland at the Helsinki Olympic Stadium. He substituted Dimitrios Kourbelis in added time, as Greece won 2–0. He is among the youngest players to debut for the Greece national team.

== Career statistics ==
=== Club ===
As of match played 22 August 2026

Appearances and goals by club, season and competition
Club	Season	League			National cup (Note: Includes Greek Cup)		League cup		Europe		Other		Total	
Club	Season	Division	Apps	Goals	Apps	Goals	Apps	Goals	Apps	Goals	Apps	Goals	Apps	Goals
Olympiacos B	2022–23	Super League Greece 2	1	0	—		—		—		—		1	0
Olympiacos B	2023–24	Super League Greece 2	15	0	—		—		—		—		15	0
Olympiacos B	Total		16	0	—		—		—		—		16	0
Olympiacos	2024–25	Super League Greece	23	1	4	1	—		9 (Note: Appearances in UEFA Europa League)	0	—		36	2
Olympiacos	2025–26	Super League Greece	26	1	2	0	—		10 (Note: Appearance(s) in UEFA Champions League)	0	1 (Note: Appearance in Greek Super Cup)	0	39	1
Olympiacos	2026–27	Super League Greece	1	0	—		—		1	0	—		2	0
Olympiacos	Total		50	2	6	1	—		20	0	1	0	76	3
Hull City	2026–27	Premier League	0	0	0	0	0	0	—		—		0	0
Career total			66	2	6	1	0	0	20	0	1	0	97	3

== Honours ==
Olympiacos Youth

- UEFA Youth League: 2023–24

Olympiacos

- Super League Greece: 2024–25
- Greek Football Cup: 2024–25
- Greek Super Cup: 2025

Individual

- Super League Greece Team of the Season: 2024–25
- Super League Greece Young Player of the Season: 2024–25
- Golden Boy Web Award: 2025

== Style of play ==
Mouzakitis mainly operates as a midfielder. He started playing football as a goalkeeper.

== Personal life ==
Mouzakitis is a native of Corfu Town, Corfu, Greece. He has regarded Croatia international Luka Modric as his football idol, even adopting his characteristics in games.
