= Konstantinos Tzolakis =

Greek footballer

- Tzolakis with Greece in 2026

Personal information
- Date of birth: 8 November 2002 (age 24)
- Place of birth: Chania, Crete, Greece
- Height: 1.93 m (6 ft 4 in)
- Position: Goalkeeper

Team information
- Current team: Hull City
- Number: 19

Youth career
- 2015–2018: Platanias
- 2018–2019: Olympiacos

Senior career*
| Years | Team | Apps | (Gls) |
| 2019–2026 | Olympiacos | 89 | (0) |
| 2026– | Hull City | 10 | (0) |

International career^{‡}
| 2017 | Greece U16 | 2 | (0) |
| 2019 | Greece U17 | 7 | (0) |
| 2020–2024 | Greece U21 | 21 | (0) |
| 2024– | Greece | 14 | (0) |
- * Club domestic league appearances and goals as of 23:00, 31 October 2026 (UTC) ‡ National team caps and goals as of 18:00, 13 November 2026 (UTC)

Konstantinos Tzolakis (Greek: Κωνσταντίνος Τζολάκης; born 8 November 2002) is a Greek professional footballer who plays as a goalkeeper for Premier League club Hull City and the Greece national team.

== Club career ==
=== Olympiacos ===
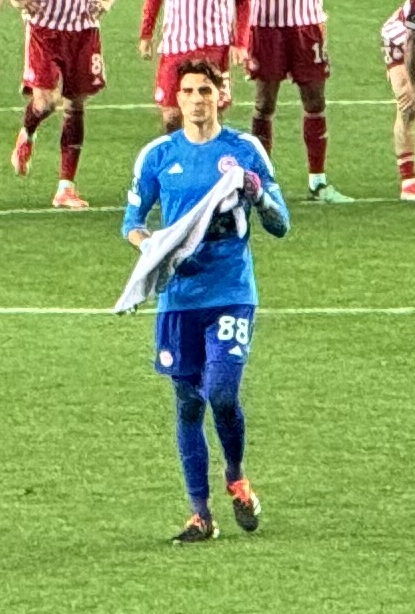
Tzolakis in 2024 with Olympiacos

Tzolakis joined the youth setup of Olympiacos in 2018, after spending three seasons with his local club Platanias in Chania Crete. He made his senior debut in 2019, at the Cup semi-final against PAOK in which he played the whole game but he conceded 3 goals as Olympiacos lost 3–2. Tzolakis made his league debut in a game against Aris getting subbed on in the place of Bobby Allain in the 78th minute. His next game was a very crucial game for the club, since the main Goalkeeper of Olympiacos, Jose Sa was injured, Tzolakis had to take his place in the starting eleven that faced AEK Athens in the Cup final. Tzolakis made some crucial saves and kept a clean sheet as Olympiacos defeated AEK 1–0 and won the title.

On 7 October 2020, Tzolakis signed a new contract with Olympiacos until the summer of 2024 for an undisclosed fee.

The following season, Tzolakis managed to play a total of 6 games despite being third in the goalkeeper pecking order; he registered 5 league appearances and 1 cup appearance against Aris. He kept a clean sheet against Asteras Tripolis twice.

On 21 July 2021, Tzolakis made a crucial save and kept a clean sheet in his European debut against Neftchi Baku in a 1–0 home win on the 2nd qualification round of UEFA Champions League.

On 18 April 2024, Tzolakis was the undisputed hero in the qualification of Olympiacos for the semi-final of the 2024 UEFA Europa Conference league, saving three penalties in a 3–2 winning shootout away at Fenerbahçe, following a 3–3 aggregate draw. He was also a key figure in helping his team lift the Conference League, as his saves played a large part in the Reds' 1–0 victory over Fiorentina after extra time, in the final held at the Agia Sophia Stadium in Athens.

=== Hull City ===
On 5 August 2026, Tzolakis signed a five-year contract with newly promoted Premier League club Hull City. The transfer fee was reportedly a club-record £20 million, plus performance-related add-ons.

He made his debut for the club on 22 August 2026, in a 2–0 home victory over Manchester United on the opening weekend of the 2026–27 Premier League season. He currently sits at 4 clean sheets.

== International career ==
After featuring regularly in the youth teams of Greece, Tzolakis earned his first full senior cap with the Greece national team, on 11 June 2024, in a friendly match against Malta held in Salzburg, Austria, keeping a clean sheet in a 2–0 win.

== Career statistics ==
=== Club ===
As of match played 07 November 2026

Appearances and goals by club, season and competition
| Club | Season | League | | | National cup (Note: Includes Greek Cup) | | League cup | | Europe | | Other | | Total | |
| Club | Season | Division | Apps | Goals | Apps | Goals | Apps | Goals | Apps | Goals | Apps | Goals | Apps | Goals |
|---|---|---|---|---|---|---|---|---|---|---|---|---|---|---|
| Olympiacos | 2019–20 | Super League Greece | 1 | 0 | 2 | 0 | — | | 0 | 0 | — | | 3 | 0 |
| Olympiacos | 2020–21 | Super League Greece | 5 | 0 | 1 | 0 | — | | 0 | 0 | — | | 6 | 0 |
| Olympiacos | 2021–22 | Super League Greece | 3 | 0 | 1 | 0 | — | | 4 (Note: Appearances in UEFA Champions League) | 0 | — | | 8 | 0 |
| Olympiacos | 2022–23 | Super League Greece | 7 | 0 | 5 | 0 | — | | 2 (Note: Appearances in UEFA Europa League) | 0 | — | | 14 | 0 |
| Olympiacos | 2023–24 | Super League Greece | 10 | 0 | 0 | 0 | — | | 6 (Note: Appearances in UEFA Europa Conference League) | 0 | — | | 16 | 0 |
| Olympiacos | 2024–25 | Super League Greece | 31 | 0 | 0 | 0 | — | | 10 | 0 | — | | 41 | 0 |
| Olympiacos | 2025–26 | Super League Greece | 32 | 0 | 1 | 0 | — | | 9 | 0 | 1 (Note: Appearance in Greek Super Cup) | 0 | 43 | 0 |
| Olympiacos | Total | | 89 | 0 | 10 | 0 | — | | 31 | 0 | 1 | 0 | 131 | 0 |
| Olympiacos B | 2021–22 | Super League Greece 2 | 16 | 0 | — | | — | | — | | — | | 16 | 0 |
| Hull City | 2026–27 | Premier League | 10 | 0 | 0 | 0 | 0 | 0 | — | | — | | 10 | 0 |
| Career total | | | 103 | 0 | 10 | 0 | 0 | 0 | 29 | 0 | 1 | 0 | 157 | 0 |

=== International ===
As of match played 13 November 2026

Appearances and goals by national team and year
| National team | Year | Apps | Goals |
|---|---|---|---|
| Greece | 2024 | 1 | 0 |
| Greece | 2025 | 6 | 0 |
| Greece | 2026 | 7 | 0 |
| Total | | 14 | 0 |

== Honours ==
Olympiacos

- Super League Greece: 2019–20, 2020–21, 2021–22, 2024–25
- Greek Football Cup: 2019–20, 2024-25
- Greek Super Cup: 2025
- UEFA Conference League: 2023–24

Individual

- Super League Greece Player of the Month: May 2023, January 2025
- Olympiacos Player of the Season: 2024–25, 2025–26
- Super League Greece Player of the Season: 2024–25
- Super League Greece Team of the Season: 2024–25
- Super League Greece Goalkeeper of the Season: 2024–25
