= Santiago Hezze =

Argentine footballer

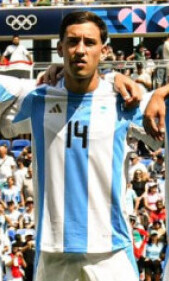
- Hezze in 2024

Personal information
- Full name: Santiago Hezze
- Date of birth: 22 October 2001 (age 25)
- Place of birth: Buenos Aires, Argentina
- Height: 1.82 m (6 ft 0 in)
- Position: Defensive midfielder

Team information
- Current team: Olympiacos
- Number: 32

Youth career
- Huracán

Senior career*
Years	Team	Apps	(Gls)
2019–2023	Huracán	75	(5)
2023–	Olympiacos	96	(0)

International career^{‡}
2021–2024	Argentina U23	7	(0)
- * Club domestic league appearances and goals as of 8 November 2026 ‡ National team caps and goals as of 11 January 2024

Santiago Hezze (born 22 October 2001) is an Argentine professional footballer who plays as a defensive midfielder for Greek Super League club Olympiacos.

== Club career ==
Hezze is a product of the Huracán youth system. He made the breakthrough into first-team football in 2019–20, initially as an unused substitute for a Copa Sudamericana three-goal loss away to Atlético Nacional on 5 February 2020. Hezze appeared for his senior debut just over a week later, as he played the full duration of a home loss to Aldosivi. Four appearances followed in his first season, including an eventual bow in the Sudamericana in the second leg against Atlético Nacional on 19 February, which saw him assist Leandro Grimi's goal in a 1–1 draw.

On 20 August 2023, he signed for Greek Super League side Olympiacos. He won the UEFA Europa Conference League in his debut season with the club. On 28 January 2026, he netted his first UEFA Champions League goal in a 2–1 away win over Ajax, securing his club's spot in the Champions League knockout play-offs.

== International career ==
In December 2019, Hezze received a call-up to train with the Argentina U23s. He is also eligible to play for Poland and Syria.

Hezze competed for Argentina at the 2024 Summer Olympics.

== Personal life ==
Hezze is the nephew of former footballer Antonio Mohamed; his father, Julio, worked with Mohamed at Monterrey. His grandmother was Polish. In January 2024, he obtained a Polish passport.

== Career statistics ==
As of match played 28 January 2026

Appearances and goals by club, season and competition
Club	Season	League			National cup (Note: Includes Copa Argentina, Greek Football Cup)		League cup (Note: Includes Copa Diego Armando Maradona/Copa de la Liga Profesional)		Continental		Other		Total	
Club	Season	Division	Apps	Goals	Apps	Goals	Apps	Goals	Apps	Goals	Apps	Goals	Apps	Goals
Huracán	2019–20	Argentine Primera División	3	0	0	0	10	1	1 (Note: Appearance in Copa Sudamericana)	0	1 (Note: Appearance in Copa de la Superliga)	0	15	0
Huracán	2021	Argentine Primera División	20	1	0	0	12	0	–		–		32	1
Huracán	2022	Argentine Primera División	26	2	1	0	10	0	–		–		37	2
Huracán	2023	Argentine Primera División	26	2	2	1	0	0	9 (Note: Four appearances in Copa Libertadores, five appearances and two goals in Copa Sudamericana)	2	–		37	5
Huracán	Total		75	5	3	1	32	1	10	2	1	0	121	8
Olympiacos	2023–24	Super League Greece	31	0	2	0	–		17 (Note: Eight appearances in UEFA Europa League, seven appearances and one goal in UEFA Conference League)	1	–		50	1
Olympiacos	2024–25	Super League Greece	30	0	6	0	–		9 (Note: Appearances in UEFA Europa League)	1	–		45	1
Olympiacos	2025–26	Super League Greece	26	0	3	0	–		9 (Note: Appearances in UEFA Champions League)	1	1 (Note: Appearance in Greek Super Cup)	0	38	1
Olympiacos	Total		87	0	11	0	–		35	3	1	0	133	3
Career total			161	5	14	1	32	1	45	5	2	0	254	11

== Honours ==
Olympiacos

- UEFA Conference League: 2023–24
- Super League Greece: 2024–25
- Greek Football Cup: 2024–25
- Greek Super Cup: 2025

Individual

- Super League Greece Player of the Month: April 2024
