= Artur Soares Dias =

Portuguese football referee (born 1979)

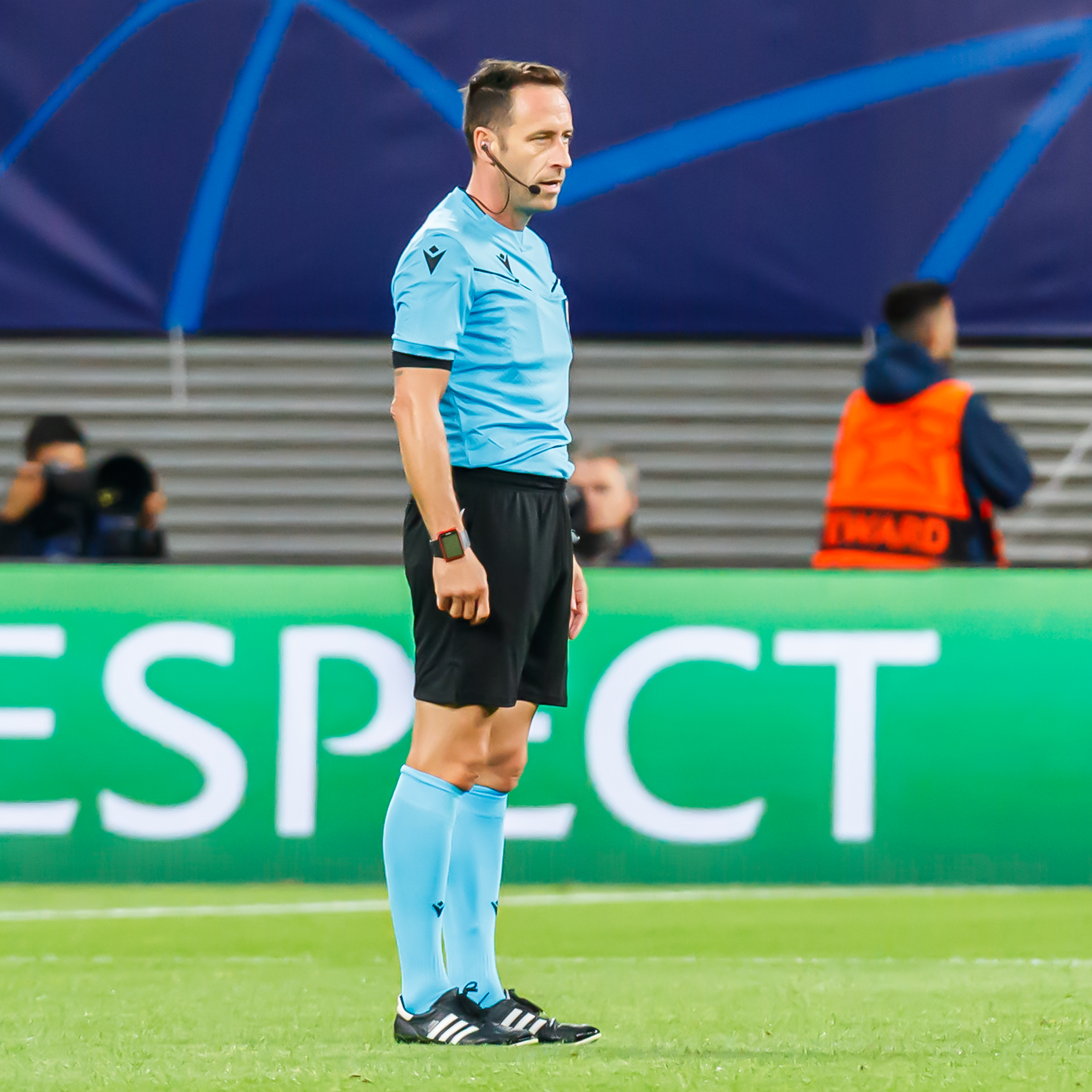
- Dias in 2023
- Full name: Artur Manuel Ribeiro Soares Dias
- Born: 14 July 1979 (age 47); Vila Nova de Gaia, Portugal

International
Years	League	Role
2010–2024	FIFA	Referee

Artur Manuel Ribeiro Soares Dias (born 14 July 1979) is a former Portuguese football referee who was a listed international referee for FIFA and UEFA from 2010 to 2024.

After having accompanied his countryman Olegário Benquerença in several UEFA Champions League as additional assistant referee, Soares Dias refereed matches at 2012–13 UEFA Europa League. Furthermore, he was appointed by the European football governing body to take charge of the Under-21 Championship play-off match between Italy and Sweden.

He was in the U20 World Cup in New Zealand in 2015 and refereed the quarter-final USA vs Serbia. He was also in Serbia in U17 Euro and refereeing the semi-final in 2011.

On 5 January 2017, while Soares Dias was getting ready to do his training in Maia, two days before officiating the Primeira Liga match between Paços de Ferreira and FC Porto, he and his family received death threats by individuals whom he identified as being part of Super Dragões, an official supporters group of FC Porto. He reported the incident to the police against "unknown individuals".

On 13 May 2024, he was selected by UEFA to referee the Europa Conference League final between Olympiacos and Fiorentina.

== See also ==
- List of football referees

Sporting positions (Portugal) Artur Soares Dias
Preceded by 2023 (Spain) Carlos del Cerro Grande	UEFA Europa Conference League final referee 2024	Succeeded by 2025 (Bosnia and Herzegovina) Irfan Peljto
