= Isidoros Koutsidis =

Greek association footballer

Personal information
- Full name: Isidoros Chrysovalantis Koutsidis
- Date of birth: 23 December 2004 (age 21)
- Place of birth: Drama, Greece
- Height: 1.91 m (6 ft 3 in)
- Position: Centre-back

Team information
- Current team: Eintracht Braunschweig
- Number: 23

Youth career
- 2016–2020: PAOK
- 2021–2024: Olympiacos

Senior career*
Years	Team	Apps	(Gls)
2020–2021	Panserraikos	7	(0)
2021–2024	Olympiacos B	33	(0)
2024–2025	Olympiacos	0	(0)
2025	→ Volos (loan)	0	(0)
2025–2026	Olympiacos B	13	(2)
2026–	Eintracht Braunschweig	0	(0)

International career^{‡}
2024–	Greece U21	1	(0)
- * Club domestic league appearances and goals as of 7 March 2026 ‡ National team caps and goals as of 19 November 2024

Isidoros Koutsidis (Greek: Ισίδωρος Κουτσίδης; born 23 December 2004) is a Greek professional footballer who plays as a centre-back for 2. Bundesliga club Eintracht Braunschweig.

== Career ==
On 8 January 2025 he joined Volos on loan.
