= Anestis Vlachomitros =

Greek footballer

Personal information
- Date of birth: 6 November 2001 (age 25)
- Place of birth: Pefki, Euboea, Greece
- Height: 1.84 m (6 ft 0 in)
- Position: Forward

Team information
- Current team: Anagennisi Karditsa
- Number: 9

Youth career
- 2010–2015: AE Istiea
- 2015–2018: Atromitos
- 2018: → Peristeri (loan)
- 2018–2019: Lamia

Senior career*
Years	Team	Apps	(Gls)
2019–2022	Lamia	6	(0)
2022–2024	Olympiacos B	37	(9)
2024–2025	Lamia	33	(6)
2025–2026	Vanspor	16	(1)
2026–	Anagennisi Karditsa	6	(0)
- * Club domestic league appearances and goals as of 20 April 2026

Anestis Vlachomitros (Greek: Ανέστης Βλαχομήτρος; born 6 November 2001) is a Greek professional footballer who plays as a forward for Super League Greece 2 club Anagennisi Karditsa.

== Personal life ==
Vlachomitros' older brother, Andreas, is also a professional footballer.
