= José Luis Mendilibar =

Spanish football manager and former footballer (born 1961)

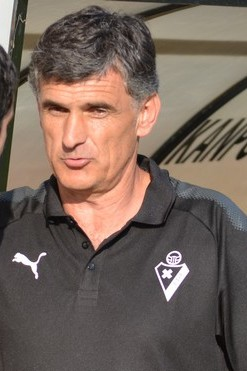
- Mendilibar as manager of Eibar in 2017

Personal information
- Full name: José Luis Mendilibar Etxebarria
- Date of birth: 14 March 1961 (age 65)
- Place of birth: Zaldibar, Spain
- Height: 1.72 m (5 ft 8 in)
- Position: Midfielder

Senior career*
Years	Team	Apps	(Gls)
1979–1982	Bilbao Athletic	106	(14)
1982–1985	Logroñés	88	(11)
1985–1993	Sestao	275	(34)
1993–1994	Lemona	28	(4)
Total		497	(63)

Managerial career
- 1994–1996: Arratia
- 1996–1997: Athletic Bilbao (youth)
- 1997–1999: Basconia
- 1999–2000: Bilbao Athletic
- 2000–2001: Basconia
- 2001–2002: Aurrerá
- 2002–2004: Lanzarote
- 2004–2005: Eibar
- 2005: Athletic Bilbao
- 2006–2010: Valladolid
- 2011–2013: Osasuna
- 2014: Levante
- 2015–2021: Eibar
- 2021–2022: Alavés
- 2023: Sevilla
- 2024–2026: Olympiacos
- * Club domestic league appearances and goals

José Luis Mendilibar Etxebarria (born 14 March 1961), also known as Mendi, is a Spanish former professional footballer who played as a midfielder, currently a manager.

He played no higher than Segunda División, making 290 appearances and scoring 34 goals mainly for Sestao. He also represented Logroñés in that league.

Mendilibar managed 18 seasons in La Liga, being in charge of Athletic Bilbao, Valladolid, Osasuna, Levante, Eibar, Alavés and Sevilla. He won the second division with Valladolid in 2006–07, the Europa League in 2023 with Sevilla and the Conference League in 2024 with Super League Greece club Olympiacos.

== Playing career ==
Mendilibar was born in Zaldibar, Basque Country. He enjoyed an average career as a player, never appearing for a club in La Liga and successively representing Bilbao Athletic, Logroñés, Sestao and Lemona.

Mendilibar was a key player in midfield for Sestao during the side's Segunda División years – playing eight seasons with them in that level and appearing in nearly 300 competitive matches – narrowly missing out on promotion in 1986–87 under Javier Irureta.

== Coaching career ==
=== Early years ===
After retiring in 1994, Mendilibar worked in the youth categories of Athletic Bilbao before having spells as head coach at Aurrerá de Vitoria, Lanzarote and Eibar. His success with the latter in the second division, on a very limited budget, translated into a narrow miss on promotion in 2005.

=== Athletic Bilbao ===
Mendilibar returned to Athletic in June 2005. His debut was the first European match of his career, a 1–0 away loss against Romania's CFR Cluj on 2 July in the second round of the UEFA Intertoto Cup (aggregate draw, elimination on penalties). His first top-flight game was a 3–0 home win over Real Sociedad in the Basque derby on 27 August.

Having not added any more victories in the ensuing nine games of the season, Mendilibar was its first manager to be sacked. He was replaced by Javier Clemente on 31 October.

=== Valladolid ===
In June 2006, Mendilibar was appointed at Real Valladolid in the second division. His team won promotion as champions in his first season, earning a record 88 points and going on a 29-game unbeaten run to secure their place in the top flight with eight fixtures remaining. In the same campaign, they reached the quarter-finals of the Copa del Rey with aggregate victories over Gimnàstic de Tarragona and Villarreal from the league above.

Mendilibar's team retained their league status from 2007 to 2009. On 1 February 2010, after a 1–1 home draw against Almería left them one point above the relegation places, he was dismissed.

=== Osasuna ===
In February 2011, Mendilibar returned to work, replacing the fired José Antonio Camacho at Osasuna on a deal until June of the following year. His first game in charge was a 4–0 home defeat of Espanyol on 20 February, and the Rojillos stayed up on the final day of the campaign with a 1–0 win over Villarreal also at the El Sadar Stadium.

Mendilibar added a further year to his contract in March 2012, and again in May of the following year. On 3 September 2013, he was relieved of his duties after three losses in as many matches to kickstart the new season.

=== Levante ===
On 29 May 2014, Mendilibar was appointed at Levante, signing a one-year contract with an option for a second season. On 20 October, after only one win in eight games, and no goals scored and 14 conceded from four home fixtures, he was dismissed.

=== Eibar ===
Mendilibar returned to Eibar on 30 June 2015, replacing Gaizka Garitano. In 2016–17, he led the team to a best-ever quarter-final finish in the domestic cup before an injury-stripped squad lost 5–2 on aggregate to Atlético Madrid; he and Asier Garitano of Leganés were joint recipients of the year's Miguel Muñoz Trophy for best manager. The following year they came ninth in the league, again a club record.

In May 2021, shortly after the team's relegation, Mendilibar announced that he would not renew his contract.

=== Alavés ===
At the turn of the calendar year, Mendilibar returned to the top division at relegation-threatened neighbours Alavés. He was fired less than four months later, with the side in last place.

=== Sevilla ===
On 21 March 2023, Mendilibar replaced Jorge Sampaoli at the helm of Sevilla. In the first European games of his career since Athletic's Intertoto elimination by Cluj in 2005, his team beat Manchester United 5–2 on aggregate in the quarter-finals of the UEFA Europa League; they eventually won the competition, defeating Roma in Budapest 4–1 on penalties following a 1–1 draw.

On 8 October 2023, Mendilibar was dismissed after winning only two of eight league matches of the new season.

=== Olympiacos ===
Mendilibar signed as manager of Olympiacos on 12 February 2024. He made his debut three days later, defeating Ferencváros 1–0 in the play-off round of the UEFA Conference League. The following week, he managed a 4–1 away win against rivals PAOK in the Super League Greece, taking the opposition from the top of the table. He guided the Piraeus-based team to the first UEFA competition semi-final in their history; there, he defeated Aston Villa of compatriot Unai Emery 6–2 on aggregate to qualify a Greek team to a continental final for the first time since Panathinaikos in 1971. He eventually led them to their first-ever European title by beating Fiorentina 1–0 in the decisive match, also a first for a Greek club.

Mendilibar won his first domestic top-flight league in the 2024–25 campaign, achieving the feat with three games left after beating AEK Athens 1–0 at home. He claimed the double on 17 May 2025, following a 2–0 victory over OFI Crete in the final of the Greek Football Cup.

On 9 September 2026, Mendilibar was sacked. During his tenure at Olympiacos, he earned the nickname The General.

== Personal life ==
Mendilibar is married to English teacher María Carmen Otamendi, and they have three children, including son Aitor who works as a filmmaker.

== Managerial statistics ==
As of match played 8 September 2026

Managerial record by team and tenure
Team	Nat	From	To	Record								Ref
Team	Nat	From	To	G	W	D	L	GF	GA	GD	Win %	Ref
Arratia	(Spain)	1 July 1994	30 June 1996	76	41	14	21	126	67	+59	53.95	
Basconia	(Spain)	30 June 1997	31 May 1999	82	39	27	16	123	79	+44	47.56	
Athletic Bilbao Β	(Spain)	31 May 1999	1 July 2000	38	15	10	13	45	35	+10	39.47	
Basconia	(Spain)	1 July 2000	30 June 2001	38	16	8	14	65	59	+6	42.11	
Aurrerá	(Spain)	30 June 2001	1 July 2002	38	12	18	8	38	33	+5	31.58	
Lanzarote	(Spain)	1 July 2002	1 July 2004	95	40	25	30	145	110	+35	42.11	
Eibar	(Spain)	1 July 2004	21 June 2005	43	20	14	9	53	39	+14	46.51	
Athletic Bilbao	(Spain)	21 June 2005	31 October 2005	13	3	3	7	12	16	−4	23.08	
Valladolid	(Spain)	20 June 2006	1 February 2010	156	62	43	51	210	206	+4	39.74	
Osasuna	(Spain)	14 February 2011	3 September 2013	102	33	26	43	110	147	−37	32.35	
Levante	(Spain)	29 May 2014	20 October 2014	8	1	2	5	4	20	−16	12.50	
Eibar	(Spain)	30 June 2015	25 May 2021	248	76	66	106	299	353	−54	30.65	
Alavés	(Spain)	28 December 2021	4 April 2022	12	1	4	7	9	23	−14	8.33	
Sevilla	(Spain)	21 March 2023	8 October 2023	28	10	11	7	44	33	+11	35.71	
Olympiacos	(Greece)	12 February 2024	9 September 2026	127	79	27	21	224	101	+123	62.20	
Total				1,104	448	298	358	1,517	1,321	+196	40.58	—

== Honours ==
Basconia

- Tercera División: 1997–98

Valladolid

- Segunda División: 2006–07

Sevilla

- UEFA Europa League: 2022–23

Olympiacos

- Super League Greece: 2024–25
- Greek Cup: 2024–25
- Greek Super Cup: 2025
- UEFA Conference League: 2023–24

Individual

- La Liga Manager of the Month: February 2017
- Miguel Muñoz Trophy: 2016–17
- Gazzetta Awards Manager of the Year in Greece: 2024
- Super League Greece Manager of the Season: 2024–25

== See also ==
- List of football managers with the most matches
