= Demethryus =

Brazilian footballer (born 1999)

Personal information
- Full name: Demethryus Maciel Areias Nascimento
- Date of birth: 5 April 1999 (age 27)
- Place of birth: São Paulo, Brazil
- Height: 1.72 m (5 ft 8 in)
- Position: Attacking midfielder

Team information
- Current team: Hwaseong
- Number: 10

Youth career
- –2014: Portuguesa
- 2015–2018: Athletico Paranaense

Senior career*
Years	Team	Apps	(Gls)
2018–2020	Athletico Paranaense	15	(0)
2019	→ Figueirense (loan)	5	(0)
2020	→ Anapolina (loan)	6	(0)
2020	→ Juventude (loan)		
2021	Juventude		
2021	Rio Branco-PR	14	(3)
2021	Episkopi	7	(2)
2022–2025	Athens Kallithea	110	(12)
2025–	Hwaseong	34	(4)
- * Club domestic league appearances and goals as of 5 August 2026

Demethryus Maciel Areias Nascimento (born 5 April 1999), simply known as Demethryus, is a Brazilian professional footballer who plays as forward for Hwaseong

== Career ==
Born in São Paulo, Demethryus passed through Athletico Paranaense before landing in Greece with Super League 2 club Episkopi, where he impressed enough in the first half of the 2021/22 season for Athens Kallithea FC to swoop for him in January 2022.
