= 2024–25 Super League Greece =

89th season of top-tier football league in Greece

Super League 1
- Season: 2024–25
- Dates: 17 August 2024 – 22 May 2025
- Champions: Olympiacos; 14th Super League Greece title 48th Greek title
- Relegated: Athens Kallithea; Lamia
- UEFA Champions League: Olympiacos; Panathinaikos
- UEFA Europa League: PAOK
- UEFA Conference League: AEK Athens; Aris
- Matches: 236
- Goals: 578 (2.45 per match)
- Best player: Konstantinos Tzolakis
- Top goalscorer: Jefté Betancor (19 goals)
- Biggest home win: PAOK 7–0 Lamia (16 February 2025)
- Biggest away win: OFI 0–5 PAOK (8 February 2025)
- Highest scoring: PAOK 7–0 Lamia (16 February 2025)
- Longest winning run: Asteras Tripolis (6 matches)
- Longest unbeaten run: Olympiacos (17 matches)
- Longest winless run: Lamia (22 matches)
- Longest losing run: Lamia (10 matches)
- Highest attendance: 56,087; Panathinaikos 0–0 Olympiacos (6 October 2024)
- Lowest attendance: 90; Volos 1–1 Athens Kallithea (28 September 2024)
- Total attendance: 1,512,774
- Average attendance: 6,694

The 2024–25 Super League Greece, also known as Stoiximan Super League for sponsorship reasons, was the 89th season of the Super League Greece, the top Greek professional league for association football clubs, since its establishment as a national championship under the supervision of the Hellenic Football Federation (HFF) in 1927, the 66th championship since the establishment of the 1st National Division in 1959 and the 19th under its current name. PAOK were the defending champions, having won their 4th title the previous season.

This season was the first to use semi-automated offside technology and goal-line technology, as Super League clubs unanimously agreed to their introduction. The technologies were introduced for the first time in the Championship play-offs this season and were also used in the 2025 Greek Cup final.

The season began on 17 August 2024 and went into a 3-week break after the conclusion of the regular season (26th Matchday). The second phase of the league, Championship play-offs, Europe play-offs and Relegation play-outs, continued on 29 March 2025. The final matches of the season were played on 22 May 2025.

The draw for the fixtures took place on Tuesday 16 July at 21:00 local time and the whole schedule for the regular season was released shortly after.

Olympiacos secured the 48th title in their history on 13 April 2025, after defeating AEK Athens by 1–0, at home in the third matchday of the Championship play-offs, the winning their first title after the 2021–22 season.

== Teams ==
Fourteen teams competed in the league – the top twelve teams from the previous season and two teams promoted from Super League 2. Levadiakos returned in the Super League after a one-year absence and the 2022–23 season. Athens Kallithea played in the Super League for the first time after 18 years. PAS Giannina were relegated to Super League 2 for the first time, after 4 consecutive years playing in the top division. A.E. Kifisia were relegated to Super League 2 after only one year in the Super League.

Promoted from 2023–24 Super League Greece 2	Relegated from 2023–24 Super League Greece 1
Levadiakos; Athens Kallithea	A.E. Kifisia; PAS Giannina

=== Format ===
The championship was held in two phases, namely the regular season (phase 1) and then the Championship play-offs with the top 4 teams, the play-offs for the UEFA Conference League 2025–26 qualifying rounds between the teams ranked 5 through 8 and the Relegation play-outs round with the bottom 6 teams (phase 2). In the regular season 26 matches were played in 2 rounds of 13 match days each, where in each round all teams competed against all others based on a draw.

==== Championship Play-offs round ====
After the end of the regular season, the teams ranked 1 through 4 participated in the Championship play-offs, to determine the winner of the league and how the places for next year's UEFA Competitions were split among those 4 teams, based on their final positions. The 4 teams that entered this round kept the total points that they won during the regular season.

The Championship play-offs were held on six game days, i.e. in two rounds of three games each, where in each round all teams competed against all others, based on a draw. The champion (of those that participated in this round) was the team that gained the most points during the regular season and the Championship play-offs combined.

==== Europe Play-offs round ====
After the end of the regular season, the teams ranked 5 through 8 participated in the Europe play-offs, to determine the last available spot for next year's UEFA Conference League 2nd qualifying round, assuming that the 2024–25 Greek Cup winner finished in the top 4, since Super League is entitled to 5 entrants in 2025-26 UEFA Competitions.

The Europe play-offs were held on six game days, i.e. in two rounds of three games each, where in each round all teams competed against all others, based on a draw. The last available European spot was given to the team (of those that participated in this round) that after the completion of the play-offs, finished in 5th place. The 4 teams that entered this round, did so with half the points they won during the regular season.

==== Relegation Play-outs round ====
After the end of the regular season, the teams ranked 9 through 14 participated in the Relegation play-outs, to determine the 2 teams that were relegated to next year's Super League 2.

The Relegation play-outs were held over ten game days i.e. in two rounds of five games each, where in each round all teams competed against all others, based on a draw. The 6 teams that entered this round, kept the total points that they won during the regular season. Positions 9 through 14 were determined by the total points the teams, participating in the play-outs, had earned cumulatively during the regular season and the play-outs. The last two teams were relegated to Super League 2.

=== Stadiums and locations ===
Locations of the 2024–25 Super League Greece 1 teams

Note: Table lists in alphabetical order.

Team	Location	Stadium	Capacity	2023–24
AEK Athens	Athens (Nea Filadelfeia)	Agia Sophia Stadium	31,100	2nd
Aris	Thessaloniki (Charilaou)	Kleanthis Vikelidis Stadium	22,800	5th
Asteras Tripolis	Tripoli	Theodoros Kolokotronis Stadium	7,423	8th
Athens Kallithea	Athens (Ampelokipoi)	Leoforos Alexandras Stadium	16,620	1st (South Group SL2)
Atromitos	Athens (Peristeri)	Peristeri Stadium	9,050	11th
Lamia	Lamia	Lamia Municipal Stadium	5,500	6th
Levadiakos	Livadeia	Levadia Municipal Stadium	5,915	1st (North Group SL2)
OFI	Heraklion	Theodoros Vardinogiannis Stadium	9,088	10th
Olympiacos	Piraeus	Karaiskakis Stadium	33,345	3rd
Panathinaikos	Athens (Marousi)	Athens Olympic Stadium	69,618	4th
Panetolikos	Agrinio	Panetolikos Stadium	7,321	9th
Panserraikos	Serres	Serres Municipal Stadium	9,500	7th
PAOK	Thessaloniki (Toumba)	Toumba Stadium	28,703	1st
Volos	Volos	Panthessaliko Stadium	22,700	12th

=== Personnel, kits and TV channel ===
Team	Manager	Captain	Kit manufacturer	Shirt sponsor (chest)	Shirt sponsor (sleeve)	Broadcast Channel
AEK Athens	(Argentina) Matías Almeyda	(Croatia) Domagoj Vida	Nike	Pame Stoixima	Piraeus Bank	Cosmote TV
Aris	(Greece) Marinos Ouzounidis	(Spain) Julián Cuesta	Kappa	Novibet	Miraval	Nova Sports
Asteras Tripolis	(Greece) Savvas Pantelidis	(Greece) Nikos Kaltsas	Macron	Aktor	Volton	Nova Sports
Athens Kallithea	(Greece) Stelios Malezas	(Greece) Giannis Loukinas	Kappa	EMST	None	Cosmote TV
Atromitos	(Uruguay) Pablo García	(Egypt) Amr Warda	Capelli	Novibet	Xmoto	Nova Sports
Lamia	(Greece) Thanasis Staikos	(Greece) Georgios Saramantas	Macron	Interwetten	Interkat, Ergokat	Cosmote TV
Levadiakos	(Greece) Nikos Papadopoulos	(Honduras) Alfredo Mejia	Macron	monobala	None	Nova Sports
OFI	(Serbia) Milan Rastavac	(Greece) Dimitrios Sotiriou	Puma	Betsson	Zaros	Cosmote TV
Olympiacos	(Spain) José Luis Mendilibar	(Greece) Panagiotis Retsos	Adidas	Stoiximan	Shopflix.gr	Cosmote TV
Panathinaikos	(Portugal) Rui Vitória	(Greece) Fotis Ioannidis	Adidas	Stoiximan	Piraeus Bank	Cosmote TV
Panetolikos	(Greece) Giannis Petrakis	(Greece) Michalis Bakakis	Givova	Novibet	Avance	Cosmote TV
Panserraikos	(Spain) Juan Ferrando	(Greece) Stavros Petavrakis	Macron	Novibet	Avance	Nova Sports
PAOK	(Romania) Răzvan Lucescu	(Portugal) Vieirinha	Macron	Stoiximan	Millionero	Nova Sports
Volos	(Greece) Kostas Georgiadis	(Greece) Anastasios Tsokanis	Admiral	Novibet	None	Cosmote TV

=== Managerial changes ===
Team	Outgoing manager	Manner of departure	Date of vacancy	Position in table	Incoming manager	Date of appointment
Panserraikos	(Uruguay) Pablo García	End of contract	11 Μay 2024	Pre-season	(Greece) Michalis Grigoriou	24 May 2024
Atromitos	(Serbia) Saša Ilić	Resigned	11 Μay 2024	Pre-season	(Uruguay) Pablo García	29 May 2024
Lamia	(Greece) Leonidas Vokolos	End of contract	22 May 2024	Pre-season	(Cyprus) Marinos Satsias	10 June 2024
Panathinaikos	(Greece) Christos Kontis (caretaker)	End of tenure as caretaker	31 May 2024	Pre-season	(Uruguay) Diego Alonso	9 June 2024
Levadiakos	(Greece) Sokratis Ofrydopoulos	Sacked	7 June 2024	Pre-season	(Greece) Nikos Papadopoulos	27 June 2024
Athens Kallithea	(Greece) Alekos Vosniadis	Sacked	11 June 2024	Pre-season	(Italy) Massimo Donati	12 June 2024
Asteras Tripolis	(Serbia) Milan Rastavac	Sacked	3 September 2024	5th	(France) Claude Makélélé	13 September 2024
Panserraikos	(Greece) Michalis Grigoriou	Sacked	16 September 2024	14th	(Spain) Juan Ferrando	18 September 2024
Volos	(Spain) Joaquín Gómez	Sacked	25 September 2024	13th	(Greece) Lefteris Kalogirou (caretaker)	25 September 2024
Volos	(Greece) Lefteris Kalogirou (caretaker)	End of tenure as caretaker	26 September 2024	13th	(Greece) Savvas Poursaitidis	26 September 2024
Lamia	(Cyprus) Marinos Satsias	Sacked	1 October 2024	11th	(Greece) Leonidas Vokolos	2 October 2024
Asteras Tripolis	(France) Claude Makélélé	Resigned	7 October 2024	7th	(Greece) Giannis Douvikas (caretaker)	8 October 2024
Asteras Tripolis	(Greece) Giannis Douvikas (caretaker)	End of tenure as caretaker	10 October 2024	7th	(Greece) Savvas Pantelidis	10 October 2024
OFI	(Greece) Traianos Dellas	Resigned	11 October 2024	6th	(Serbia) Milan Rastavac	11 October 2024
Panathinaikos	(Uruguay) Diego Alonso	Sacked	29 October 2024	8th	(Portugal) Rui Vitória	31 October 2024
Volos	(Greece) Savvas Poursaitidis	Sacked	12 November 2024	11th	(Greece) Kostas Bratsos	13 November 2024
Aris	(Greece) Akis Mantzios	Sacked	9 December 2024	5th	(Greece) Marinos Ouzounidis	12 December 2024
Athens Kallithea	(Italy) Massimo Donati	Sacked	12 December 2024	14th	(Greece) Antonis Prionas (caretaker)	13 December 2024
Athens Kallithea	(Greece) Antonis Prionas (caretaker)	End of tenure as caretaker	22 December 2024	13th	(Greece) Stelios Malezas	23 December 2024
Lamia	(Greece) Leonidas Vokolos	Sacked	20 January 2025	14th	(Greece) Thanasis Staikos	22 January 2025
Volos	(Greece) Kostas Bratsos	Sacked	23 February 2025	12th	(Greece) Kostas Georgiadis	25 February 2025

== League table ==
Pos	Team	Pld	W	D	L	GF	GA	GD	Pts	Qualification or relegation
1	Olympiacos	26	18	6	2	45	16	+29	60	Qualification for the Championship play-offs
2	AEK Athens	26	16	5	5	44	16	+28	53	Qualification for the Championship play-offs
3	Panathinaikos	26	14	8	4	31	22	+9	50	Qualification for the Championship play-offs
4	PAOK	26	14	4	8	51	26	+25	46	Qualification for the Championship play-offs
5	Aris	26	12	6	8	31	28	+3	42	Qualification for the Europe play-offs
6	OFI	26	10	6	10	37	38	−1	36	Qualification for the Europe play-offs
7	Atromitos	26	10	5	11	32	32	0	35	Qualification for the Europe play-offs
8	Asteras Tripolis	26	10	5	11	27	29	−2	35	Qualification for the Europe play-offs
9	Panetolikos	26	9	6	11	20	22	−2	33	Qualification for the Relegation play-outs
10	Levadiakos	26	6	10	10	30	34	−4	28	Qualification for the Relegation play-outs
11	Panserraikos	26	8	4	14	30	47	−17	28	Qualification for the Relegation play-outs
12	Volos	26	6	4	16	20	42	−22	22	Qualification for the Relegation play-outs
13	Athens Kallithea	26	4	9	13	24	40	−16	21	Qualification for the Relegation play-outs
14	Lamia	26	3	6	17	14	44	−30	15	Qualification for the Relegation play-outs

Source: Super League Greece
Rules for classification: 1) Points; 2) Head-to-head points; 3) Head-to-head goal difference; 4) Goal difference; 5) Goals scored; 6) Play-offs (neutral ground).
(Note: Criterion 6 is only used if needed to decide champion, teams for relegation or teams for UEFA competitions).

== Results ==
Home \ Away	AEK	ARIS	AST	ATK	ATR	LAM	LEV	OFI	OLY	PAO	PNE	PNS	PAOK	VOL
AEK Athens	—	4–0	3–0	2–0	2–1	1–1	1–1	3–0	0–1	2–0	1–0	5–0	1–1	2–0
Aris	0–0	—	1–1	2–0	2–1	2–0	3–1	0–2	2–1	2–0	2–1	1–0	0–0	0–1
Asteras Tripolis	0–3	2–1	—	1–0	1–2	1–0	1–1	3–0	1–0	0–1	2–0	1–2	1–2	0–1
Athens Kallithea	0–0	0–1	1–3	—	0–3	2–1	2–4	1–3	1–1	2–2	1–1	1–2	2–1	2–0
Atromitos	0–1	1–1	0–1	1–2	—	4–2	2–1	0–0	1–2	1–1	0–2	1–0	1–2	1–2
Lamia	0–1	0–2	0–0	0–0	0–3	—	0–2	1–1	0–3	3–1	0–1	1–2	1–2	1–0
Levadiakos	0–3	4–1	1–2	0–0	1–2	2–2	—	1–1	0–1	0–1	1–1	1–0	0–2	3–2
OFI	1–2	3–2	2–1	2–2	1–1	3–0	0–0	—	0–2	0–1	1–2	3–2	0–5	4–0
Olympiacos	4–1	2–1	1–1	2–1	2–0	1–0	2–2	1–0	—	1–1	0–0	2–1	2–1	3–0
Panathinaikos	1–0	1–1	0–1	1–0	1–1	1–0	1–0	3–2	0–0	—	2–0	3–1	2–1	2–1
Panetolikos	1–0	2–1	1–1	2–0	0–1	0–1	0–0	1–0	0–2	1–2	—	3–0	0–1	0–1
Panserraikos	1–0	0–1	2–1	2–1	2–3	2–0	2–2	2–3	0–4	2–2	0–0	—	1–4	1–1
PAOK	1–2	0–1	2–0	2–2	3–0	7–0	1–0	1–2	2–3	0–0	2–0	3–2	—	1–2
Volos	2–4	1–1	2–1	1–1	0–1	0–0	1–2	1–3	0–2	0–1	0–1	0–1	1–4	—

Source: Super League Greece
Legend: Blue = home team win; Yellow = draw; Red = away team win.
For upcoming matches, an "a" indicates there is an article about the rivalry between the two participants.

== Positions by round ==
The table lists the positions of teams after each week of matches. To preserve chronological evolvements, any postponed matches are not included in the round at which they were originally scheduled, but added to the full round they were played immediately afterwards. For example, if a match is scheduled for round 13, but then postponed and played between rounds 16 and 17, it will be added to the standings for round 16. Juridical decisions regarding a match are also added to the full round after which they were ruled.

Team ╲ Round	1	2	3	4	5	6	7	8	9	10	11	12	13	14	15	16	17	18	19	20	21	22	23	24	25	26
Olympiacos	2	2	1	2	3	2	4	4	4	4	3	1	1	1	1	1	1	1	1	1	1	1	1	1	1	1
AEK Athens	1	3	3	1	2	1	3	3	3	3	2	4	2	2	2	4	3	2	3	2	2	2	2	2	2	2
Panathinaikos	11	8	6	7	7	8	8	6	8	6	5	3	4	4	4	3	2	3	2	3	3	3	3	3	3	3
PAOK	3	1	2	3	1	3	1	2	2	2	4	2	3	3	3	2	4	4	4	4	4	4	4	4	4	4
Aris	6	5	4	5	6	4	2	1	1	1	1	5	5	5	5	5	5	5	6	6	6	5	5	5	5	5
OFI	14	12	7	4	4	7	6	7	6	8	8	9	10	10	8	7	7	7	8	7	8	9	8	7	6	6
Atromitos	7	9	11	6	5	6	9	9	9	9	9	7	7	7	7	8	9	9	9	9	7	8	9	9	8	7
Asteras Tripolis	4	7	5	10	10	9	7	8	7	5	7	8	9	9	11	9	8	6	5	5	5	6	6	6	7	8
Panetolikos	12	14	9	9	9	5	5	5	5	7	6	6	6	6	6	6	6	8	7	8	9	7	7	8	9	9
Levadiakos	9	11	13	13	12	12	13	14	13	13	12	12	12	12	12	12	10	11	12	12	12	11	10	10	10	10
Panserraikos	10	13	14	14	14	13	14	10	10	10	10	10	8	8	10	10	11	12	10	10	10	10	11	11	11	11
Volos	13	6	10	12	13	14	10	11	11	11	11	11	11	11	9	11	12	10	11	11	11	12	12	12	12	12
Athens Kallithea	8	10	12	11	11	10	11	13	14	14	13	14	14	14	13	13	13	13	13	13	13	13	13	13	13	13
Lamia	5	4	8	8	8	11	12	12	12	12	14	13	13	13	14	14	14	14	14	14	14	14	14	14	14	14

Leader and Championship Play-Offs
Championship Play-Offs
Europe Play-Offs
Relegation Play-Outs

Source: Super League Greece

== Championship play-offs ==
The top four teams from the regular season met twice (6 matches per team) for places in the 2025–26 UEFA Champions League, 2025–26 UEFA Europa League and 2025–26 UEFA Conference League as well as deciding the League Champion.

Pos	Team	Pld	W	D	L	GF	GA	GD	Pts	Qualification
1	Olympiacos (C)	32	23	6	3	58	22	+36	75	Qualification for the Champions League league phase (Note: Olympiacos originally qualified for the 2025–26 UEFA Champions League second qualifying round, but since the 2024–25 UEFA Champions League winner (Paris Saint-Germain) already qualified via their domestic league, Olympiacos was promoted to the Champions League league phase as the league champion with the highest club coefficient in the Champions League Champions Path qualifying rounds.)
2	Panathinaikos	32	17	8	7	42	32	+10	59	Qualification for the Champions League second qualifying round
3	PAOK	32	18	4	10	62	37	+25	58	Qualification for the Europa League third qualifying round (Note: Since the 2024–25 Greek Cup winner (Olympiacos) qualified for the Champions League, the Europa League third qualifying round place was passed to the third-placed team.)
4	AEK Athens	32	16	5	11	48	28	+20	53	Qualification for the Conference League second qualifying round

Source: Super League Greece
Rules for classification: 1) Points; 2) Head-to-head points (Regular season and play-off); 3) Head-to-head goal difference (Regular season and play-off); 4) Regular season position.
(C) Champions

=== Results ===
Home \ Away	OLY	PAO	PAOK	AEK
Olympiacos	—	4–2	4–2	1–0
Panathinaikos	0–1	—	3–1	3–1
PAOK	2–1	2–1	—	1–0
AEK Athens	0–2	1–2	2–3	—

Source: Super League Greece
Legend: Blue = home team win; Yellow = draw; Red = away team win.
For upcoming matches, an "a" indicates there is an article about the rivalry between the two participants.

=== Positions by round ===
Team ╲ Round	27	28	29	30	31	32
Olympiacos	1	1	1	1	1	1
Panathinaikos	3	2	2	2	2	2
PAOK	4	4	4	3	3	3
AEK Athens	2	3	3	4	4	4

Champions and Champions League league phase
Champions League second qualifying round
Europa League third qualifying round
Conference League second qualifying round

Source: Super League Greece

== Europe play-offs ==
The teams ranked 5 through 8 from the regular season participated in the Europe play-offs to determine the last available spot for 2025–26 UEFA Conference League, which was awarded to the 5th placed team because the 2024–25 Greek Cup winner, Olympiacos, finished in the top 4. The teams met twice (6 matches per team) and entered this round with half the points they earned during the regular season.

Pos	Team	Pld	W	D	L	GF	GA	GD	Pts	Qualification
5	Aris	32	16	8	8	42	32	+10	35	Qualification for the Conference League second qualifying round
6	Asteras Tripolis	32	13	5	14	35	40	−5	27	
7	Atromitos	32	12	7	13	39	37	+2	26	
8	OFI	32	10	8	14	40	47	−7	20	

Source: Super League Greece
Rules for classification: 1) Points; 2) Head-to-head points (Regular season and play-off); 3) Head-to-head goal difference (Regular season and play-off); 4) Regular season position.

=== Results ===
Home \ Away	ARIS	AST	ATR	OFI
Aris	—	4–2	1–0	2–0
Asteras Tripolis	0–2	—	1–4	2–1
Atromitos	1–1	0–1	—	0–0
OFI	1–1	0–2	1–2	—

Source: Super League Greece
Legend: Blue = home team win; Yellow = draw; Red = away team win.
For upcoming matches, an "a" indicates there is an article about the rivalry between the two participants.

=== Positions by round ===
Team ╲ Round	27	28	29	30	31	32
Aris	5	5	5	5	5	5
Asteras Tripolis	7	6	6	6	6	6
Atromitos	6	7	7	7	7	7
OFI	8	8	8	8	8	8

Qualification for the Conference League second qualifying round

Source: Super League Greece

== Relegation play-outs ==
The teams ranked 9 through 14 from the regular season participated in the Relegation play-outs. They met twice (10 matches per team) to determine the last 2 teams that were relegated to 2025–26 Super League 2.

Pos	Team	Pld	W	D	L	GF	GA	GD	Pts	Qualification
9	Levadiakos	36	13	11	12	50	43	+7	50	
10	Panetolikos	36	13	9	14	29	31	−2	48	
11	Volos	36	11	6	19	36	52	−16	39	
12	Panserraikos	36	10	7	19	40	61	−21	37	
13	Athens Kallithea (R)	36	8	12	16	36	52	−16	36	Relegation to Super League 2
14	Lamia (R)	36	4	8	24	21	64	−43	20	Relegation to Gamma Ethniki

Source: Super League Greece
Rules for classification: 1) Points; 2) Head-to-head points (Regular season and play-out); 3) Head-to-head goal difference (Regular season and play-out); 4) Regular season position.
(R) Relegated

=== Results ===
Home \ Away	LEV	PNE	PNS	VOL	ATK	LAM
Levadiakos	—	1–2	3–0	3–2	4–1	0–0
Panetolikos	1–2	—	1–0	0–3	0–1	1–0
Panserraikos	0–1	1–1	—	3–0	3–1	1–1
Volos	1–0	0–0	3–0	—	0–2	3–0
Athens Kallithea	0–3	0–0	1–1	1–1	—	3–0
Lamia	2–3	1–3	2–1	1–3	0–2	—

Source: Super League Greece
Legend: Blue = home team win; Yellow = draw; Red = away team win.
For upcoming matches, an "a" indicates there is an article about the rivalry between the two participants.

=== Positions by round ===
Team ╲ Round	27	28	29	30	31	32	33	34	35	36
Levadiakos	10	9	10	10	9	9	9	9	9	9
Panetolikos	9	10	9	9	10	10	10	10	10	10
Volos	12	13	12	12	11	12	12	11	11	11
Panserraikos	11	11	11	11	12	11	11	12	12	12
Athens Kallithea	13	12	13	13	13	13	13	13	13	13
Lamia	14	14	14	14	14	14	14	14	14	14

Relegation to Super League 2
Relegation to Gamma Ethniki

Source: Super League Greece

== Season statistics ==
As of 22 May 2025

=== Top scorers ===
Rank	Player	Club	Goals
1	(Spain) Jefté Betancor	Panserraikos	19
2	(Morocco) Ayoub El Kaabi	Olympiacos	18
2	(Spain) Loren Morón	Aris	18
4	(Angola) Zini	Levadiakos	14
5	(Guinea) Mady Camara	PAOK	9
5	(France) Migouel Alfarela	Athens Kallithea	9
7	(Argentina) Thiago Nuss	OFI	8
7	(Serbia) Andrija Živković	PAOK	8
7	(Colombia) Juan Salazar	Panserraikos	8
7	(Slovenia) Alen Ožbolt	Levadiakos	8
11	(France) Anthony Martial	AEK Athens	7
11	(Greece) Charalambos Kostoulas	Olympiacos	7
11	(Portugal) Gelson Martins	Olympiacos	7
11	(Greece) Giannis Konstantelias	PAOK	7
11	(Serbia) Filip Đuričić	Panathinaikos	7

==== Hat-tricks ====
Player	For	Against	Result	Date
(Morocco) Ayoub El Kaabi	Olympiacos	AEK Athens	4–1 (H)	24 November 2024
(Angola) Zini	Levadiakos	Athens Kalithea	4–2 (A)	9 December 2024
(Greece) Giannis Konstantelias	PAOK	Lamia	7–0 (H)	16 February 2025

=== Clean sheets ===
Rank	Player	Club	Clean sheets
1	(Greece) Konstantinos Tzolakis	Olympiacos	16
2	(Albania) Thomas Strakosha	AEK Athens	13
2	(Spain) Julián Cuesta	Aris	13
2	(Argentina) Lucas Chaves	Panetolikos	13
5	(Croatia) Dominik Kotarski	PAOK	11
6	(Poland) Bartłomiej Drągowski	Panathinaikos	10

== Awards ==
=== Stoiximan Player of the Month ===
Month	Player	Club	Ref
August	(Greece) Stavros Pilios	AEK Athens	
September	(Spain) Manu García	Aris	
October	(Spain) Loren Morón	Aris	
November	(France) Anthony Martial	AEK Athens	
December	(Greece) Charalambos Kostoulas	Olympiacos	
January	(Greece) Konstantinos Tzolakis	Olympiacos	
February	(Spain) Loren Morón	Aris	
March	(Greece) Giannis Konstantelias	PAOK	
April	(Spain) Loren Morón	Aris	
May			

=== Stoiximan Player of the Club ===
Club	MVP	Ref
Olympiacos	(Greece) Konstantinos Tzolakis	
Panathinaikos	(Morocco) Azzedine Ounahi	
PAOK	(Guinea) Mady Camara	
AEK Athens	(Greece) Petros Mantalos	
Aris	(Spain) Loren Morón	
Asteras Tripolis	(Greece) Nikos Kaltsas	
Atromitos	(Greece) Nikos Athanasiou	
OFI	(Argentina) Thiago Nuss	
Levadiakos	(Angola) Zini	
Panetolikos	(Argentina) Lucas Chaves	
Volos	(Greece) Alexis Kalogeropoulos	
Panserraikos	(Spain) Jefté Betancor	
Athens Kallithea	(Brazil) Demethryus	
Lamia	(Greece) Anestis Vlachomitros	

=== Stoiximan Player of the Season ===
Player	Club	Votes	Ref
(Greece) Konstantinos Tzolakis	Olympiacos	38.29%	

=== Stoiximan Goal of the Season ===
Player	Club	Match	Votes	Ref
(Argentina) Erik Lamela	AEK Athens	vs PAOK 0–2 (Matchday 21)	17.42%	

=== Stoiximan Best Goal ===
Matchday	Player	Club	Ref
Regular Season
1st	(Greece) Stavros Pilios	AEK Athens	
2nd	(Ecuador) José Cifuentes	Aris	
3rd	(Sweden) Niclas Eliasson	AEK Athens	
4th	(Italy) Eddie Salcedo	OFI	
5th	(Spain) Manu García	Aris	
6th	(Spain) Manu García	Aris	
7th	(Portugal) Miguel Luís	Panetolikos	
8th	(Greece) Giannis Bouzoukis	Panetolikos	
9th	(Spain) Loren Morón	Aris	
10th	(Serbia) Andrija Živković	PAOK	
11th	(Spain) Manu García	Aris	
12th	(Morocco) Ayoub El Kaabi	Olympiacos	
13th	(Trinidad and Tobago) Levi García	AEK Athens	
14th	(Greece) Charalampos Kostoulas	Olympiacos	
15th	(Nigeria) Chidera Okoh	Asteras Tripolis	
16th	(Sweden) Alexander Jeremejeff	Panathinaikos	
17th	(Morocco) Azzedine Ounahi	Panathinaikos	
18th	(Spain) Loren Morón	Aris	
19th	(Brazil) Demethryus	Athens Kallithea	
20th	(Spain) Loren Morón	Aris	
21st	(Argentina) Erik Lamela	AEK Athens	
22nd	(Ecuador) Kike Saverio	Aris	
23rd	(Russia) Fyodor Chalov	PAOK	
24th	(Spain) Monchu	Aris	
25th	(Portugal) Chiquinho	Olympiacos	
26th	(Greece) Giannis Loukinas	Athens Kallithea	
Play-offs
1st & 2nd	(Portugal) Chiquinho	Olympiacos	
3rd & 4th	(Ukraine) Roman Yaremchuk	Olympiacos	
5th & 6th	(Greece) Giannis Michailidis	PAOK	
Play-outs
1st & 2nd	(Greece) Panagiotis Liagas	Levadiakos	
3rd & 4th	(Argentina) Guillermo Balzi	Levadiakos	
5th, 6th & 7th	(Angola) Zini	Levadiakos	
8th, 9th & 10th	(Greece) Anestis Vlachomitros	Lamia	

=== Annual awards ===
Annual awards were announced on 23 September 2025.

Award	Winner	Club
Greek Player of the Season	(Greece) Giannis Konstantelias	PAOK
Foreign Player of the Season	(Morocco) Ayoub El Kaabi	Olympiacos
Young Player of the Season	(Greece) Christos Mouzakitis	Olympiacos
Goalkeeper of the Season	(Greece) Konstantinos Tzolakis	Olympiacos
Golden Boot	(Spain) Jefté Betancor	Panserraikos
Manager of the Season	(Spain) José Luis Mendilibar	Olympiacos

Team of the Season
Goalkeeper	(Greece) Konstantinos Tzolakis (Olympiacos)			
Defence	(Greece) Georgios Vagiannidis (Panathinaikos)	(Greece) Panagiotis Retsos (Olympiacos)	(Greece) Giannis Michailidis (PAOK)	(Greece) Nikos Athanasiou (Atromitos)
Midfield	(Greece) Giannis Konstantelias (PAOK)	(Morocco) Azzedine Ounahi (Panathinaikos)	(Greece) Christos Mouzakitis (Olympiacos)	(Portugal) Gelson Martins (Olympiacos)
Attack	(Spain) Loren Morón (Aris)		(Morocco) Ayoub El Kaabi (Olympiacos)	

== Attendances ==
=== Overall ===
As of 22 May 2025

Pos	Team	Total	High	Low	Average	Change
1	Olympiacos (16)	431,429	33,065	17,346	26,964	n/a
2	AEK Athens (12)	287,314	30,950	16,054	23,943	n/a
3	Panathinaikos (13)	210,423	56,087	5,554	16,186	n/a
4	PAOK (16)	228,371	22,711	4,742	14,273	n/a
5	Aris (13)	94,203	12,303	3,548	7,246	n/a
6	OFI (16)	60,366	5,200		3,773	n/a
7	Panetolikos (18)	36,478	3,519	1,058	2,027	n/a
8	Panserraikos (18)	36,208	5,123		2,012	n/a
9	Asteras Tripolis (16)	24,346	3,756		1,522	n/a
10	Volos (18)	26,271	9,597	90	1,460	n/a
11	Lamia (18)	21,237	4,451		1,180	n/a
12	Levadiakos (18)	20,814	2,947		1,156	n/a^{1}
13	Atromitos (16)	17,564	2,573		1,098	n/a
14	Athens Kallithea (18)	17,750	6,064		986	n/a^{1}
	League total	1,512,774	56,087	90	6,694	n/a

Updated to match(es) played on 22 May 2025. Source: Super League Greece
Notes:
1: Team was promoted from the 2023–24 Super League Greece 2.

=== Home matches played ===
Team \ Match played	Regular season													Play-off & play-out					Total
Team \ Match played	1	2	3	4	5	6	7	8	9	10	11	12	13	1	2	3	4	5	Total
AEK Athens	—	16,054	22,540	30,082	30,950	—	22,505	22,150	21,180	21,433	—	—	30,663	25,433	22,152	22,172			287,314 (12)
Aris	—	7,222	6,530	7,950	11,395	12,303	—	—	5,598	10,558	8,740	3,548	5,281	4,161	5,807	5,110			94,203 (13)
Asteras Tripolis	1,257	1,838	947	3,756	1,007	1,855	2,779	925	502	921	884	952	1,902	1,603	1,664	1,554			24,346 (16)
Athens Kallithea	6,064	475	823	548	1,414	760	567	238	710	600	1,279	723	401	943	718	593	452	442	17,750 (18)
Atromitos	1,030	2,573	869	458	1,311	1,835	853	807	824	1,792	556	622	1,509	791	1,016	718			17,564 (16)
Lamia	2,831	1,168	943	934	1,412	963	770	4,451	822	1,466	655	1,130	884	970	624	384	374	456	21,237 (18)
Levadiakos	398	2,947	380	1,012	958	983	605	2,760	902	857	2,261	1,535	1,137	786	759	838	761	935	20,814 (18)
OFI	2,344	3,104	3,050	5,200	3,118	4,980	4,414	3,544	3,354	3,494	4,684	3,754	3,894	3,744	3,694	3,994			60,366 (16)
Olympiacos	20,005	24,181	21,573	22,543	20,197	32,353	17,346	18,307	29,532	32,646	29,600	32,431	33,065	32,500	32,600	32,550			431,429 (16)
Panathinaikos	—	6,345	—	56,087	18,702	11,068	14,171	11,844	—	22,937	16,308	6,733	5,554	10,272	14,350	16,052			210,423 (13)
Panetolikos	1,810	1,606	1,573	2,362	2,447	2,087	3,028	2,087	3,519	1,879	1,805	1,890	3,027	1,245	1,599	1,358	1,058	2,098	36,478 (18)
Panserraikos	2,910	847	1,192	5,123	1,128	460	4,971	1,439	1,440	888	1,067	4,424	2,333	1,783	1,755	1,733	1,571	1,144	36,208 (18)
PAOK	7,668	10,171	18,511	19,282	12,419	21,684	4,742	17,275	4,819	11,559	22,150	7,672	9,121	20,312	18,275	22,711			228,371 (16)
Volos	5,366	332	3,186	90	368	4,213	183	193	9,597	297	321	254	191	351	316	365	352	296	26,271 (18)
League total																			1,512,774

Source: Super League Greece
