= Apostolos Apostolopoulos =

Greek professional footballer

Personal information
- Full name: Apostolos-Chrysovalantis Apostolopoulos
- Date of birth: 11 December 2002 (age 23)
- Place of birth: Serres, Greece
- Height: 1.79 m (5 ft 10 in)
- Position: Left-back

Team information
- Current team: Panetolikos
- Number: 65

Youth career
- 2007–2018: Panserraikos

Senior career*
| Years | Team | Apps | (Gls) |
| 2018–2020 | Panserraikos | 48 | (0) |
| 2020–2025 | Olympiacos | 7 | (0) |
| 2021–2024 | Olympiacos B | 74 | (2) |
| 2025– | Panetolikos | 33 | (2) |

International career^{‡}
| 2022–2024 | Greece U21 | 6 | (0) |
- * Club domestic league appearances and goals as of 20 September 2026 ‡ National team caps and goals as of 19 November 2024

Apostolos Apostolopoulos (Greek: Απόστολος Αποστολόπουλος; born 11 December 2002) is a Greek professional footballer who plays as a left-back for Super League club Panetolikos.

== Career statistics ==
As of match played 16 December 2024.

Appearances and goals by club, season and competition
| Club | Season | League | | | Greek Cup | | Continental | | Other | | Total | |
| Club | Season | Division | Apps | Goals | Apps | Goals | Apps | Goals | Apps | Goals | Apps | Goals |
|---|---|---|---|---|---|---|---|---|---|---|---|---|
| Panserraikos | 2019–20 | Gamma Ethniki | | | 4 | 0 | — | | 0 | 0 | 4 | 0 |
| Olympiacos | 2020–21 | Super League Greece | 0 | 0 | 0 | 0 | — | | 0 | 0 | 0 | 0 |
| Olympiacos | 2021–22 | Super League Greece | 0 | 0 | 1 | 0 | — | | 0 | 0 | 1 | 0 |
| Olympiacos | 2023–24 | Super League Greece | 2 | 0 | 0 | 0 | 1 (Note: Appearance in UEFA Europa Conference League) | 0 | 0 | 0 | 3 | 0 |
| Olympiacos | 2024–25 | Super League Greece | 5 | 0 | 2 | 0 | 1 (Note: Appearance in UEFA Europa League) | 0 | 0 | 0 | 7 | 0 |
| Olympiacos | Total | | 7 | 0 | 3 | 0 | 2 | 0 | 0 | 0 | 12 | 0 |
| Olympiacos B | 2021–22 | Super League Greece 2 | 30 | 1 | — | | — | | 0 | 0 | 30 | 1 |
| Olympiacos B | 2022–23 | Super League Greece 2 | 23 | 0 | — | | — | | 0 | 0 | 23 | 0 |
| Olympiacos B | 2023–24 | Super League Greece 2 | 21 | 1 | — | | — | | 0 | 0 | 21 | 1 |
| Olympiacos B | Total | | 74 | 2 | — | | — | | 0 | 0 | 74 | 2 |
| Career total | | | 81 | 2 | 7 | 0 | 2 | 0 | 0 | 0 | 90 | 2 |

== Honours ==
Olympiacos

- UEFA Conference League: 2023–24
