= 2024–25 PAS Giannina F.C. season =

PAS Giannina
2024–25 season
- Chairman: Panagiotis Christovasilis
- Manager: René Poms (until 21 October); Vagelis Tziarras (caretaker, from 21 October until 27 October); Ariel Galeano (from 26 October until 6 February); Nikos Badimas (from 6 February)
- Stadium: Zosimades Stadium, Ioannina
- Super League 2: 3rd
- Greek Cup: 4th Round
- Average home league attendance: 1,180
| Home colours | Away colours | Third colours |

The 2024–25 season is PAS Giannina F.C.'s 28th competitive season in the second division of Greek football, 2nd season in the Super League Greece 2, and 59th year in existence as a football club. They also compete in the Greek Cup.

== Players ==
Updated 27 March 2025

| No. | Name | Nationality | Position(s) | Place of birth | Date of birth | Signed from | Notes |
|---|---|---|---|---|---|---|---|
Goalkeepers
| 1 | Panagiotis Ginis | (Greece) | GK | Athens, Greece | 23 January 1999 | (Albania) Egnatia | |
| 74 | Thomas Vrakas | (Greece) | GK | Ioannina, Greece | 22 July 2004 | (Greece) PAS Giannina U19 | |
| 99 | Vasilis Athanasiou (Vice Captain) | (Greece) | GK | Aigio, Greece | 24 July 1999 | (Italy) Mantova | |
Defenders
| 12 | Ilias Simantirakis | (Greece) | LB | | 22 December 2005 | (Greece) OFI | Loan |
| 20 | Vasilis Kaperdas | (Greece) | RB | Ioannina, Greece | 25 July 2004 | (Greece) GS Ilioupolis | |
| 21 | Dimitris Naoumis | (Greece) | LB | Ioannina, Greece | 3 August 2004 | (Greece) PAS Giannina U19 | |
| 25 | Xenofon Panos | (Greece) | RB | Ioannina, Greece | 25 August 1989 | (Greece) Kozani | |
| 38 | Panagiotis Kafenzis | (Greece) | CB | Ioannina, Greece | 5 October 2005 | (Greece) PAS Giannina U19 | |
| 42 | Fotios Gogas | (Greece) | CB | Ioannina, Greece | 22 March 2008 | (Greece) PAS Giannina U19 | |
| 44 | Alexandros Doumas | (Greece) | CB | | 3 February 2003 | (Greece) Pallavreotikos | |
| 45 | Gerasimos Bakadimas | (Greece) | CB | Xiromero, Greece | 6 June 2000 | (Greece) Panetolikos | |
| 77 | Vasilis Athanasiou | (Greece) | RB / WRB | | 8 August 2005 | (Greece) PAS Giannina U19 | |
| 80 | Tasos Loupas | (Greece) | LB | | 8 December 2006 | (Greece) PAS Giannina U19 | |
Midfielders
| 4 | Miguel Azeez | (England) | CM / AM | Camden, England | 20 September 2002 | (Spain) Atlético Baleares | |
| 5 | Christos Voutsas | (Greece) | DM | Thessaloniki, Greece | 31 July 2001 | (Greece) Panathinaikos B | |
| 8 | Alexandros Lolis | (Greece) | MF | Ladochori Thesprotias, Greece | 5 September 2002 | (Greece) Giouchtas | |
| 16 | Matúš Begala | (Slovakia) | DM / CM / AM | Stará Ľubovňa, Slovakia | 7 April 2001 | (Slovakia) Zemplín Michalovce | |
| 19 | Iason Kyrkos | (Greece) | AM / FW | Ioannina, Greece | 21 March 2003 | (Greece) PAS Giannina U19 | |
| 27 | Moritz Heinrich | (Germany) | W | Waldtrudering, Germany | 3 July 1997 | (Austria) DSV Leoben | |
| 32 | Angelos Tsiris | (Greece) | DM / CM | Ioannina, Greece | 18 August 2004 | (Greece) Giouchtas | |
| 40 | Tim Rieder | (Germany) | DM | Dachau, Germany | 3 September 1993 | (Germany) 1860 Munich | |
| 70 | Orestis Kalemi | (Greece) | AM | | 9 March 2006 | (Greece) PAS Giannina U19 | |
| 88 | Alexandros Nikolias | (Greece) | CM / RLW | Kymi, Greece | 23 July 1994 | (Greece) Levadiakos | |
Forwards
| 9 | Vasilios Mantzis | (Greece) | FW | Grammatiko, Attica, Greece | 4 December 1991 | (Greece) Asteras Tripolis | |
| 11 | Jean-Baptiste Léo | (France) (Collectivity of Saint Martin) | FW | Lyon, France | 3 May 1996 | (Latvia) Riga | |
| 22 | Leonid Mina | (Greece) | FW | Preveza, Greece | 28 March 2004 | (Germany) SV Werder Bremen II | |
| 90 | Nikos Tzovaras | (Greece) | FW | Ioannina, Greece | 26 February 2007 | (Greece) PAS Giannina U19 | |
Left during Winter Transfer Window
| 7 | Federico Gino | (Uruguay) | DM / CM | Melo, Uruguay | 26 February 1993 | (Argentina) Platense | |
| 72 | Konstantinos Lampsias | (Greece) | RB | Athens, Greece | 18 September 2002 | (Greece) Panathinaikos B | Loan |
| 2 | Carles Soria (Captain) | (Spain) | RB | Calaf, Spain | 8 October 1996 | (Portugal) Estoril | |
| 10 | Kido Taylor-Hart | (England) (Jamaica) | FW | London, England | 30 September 2002 | Free | |
| 14 | Stefan Šćepović | (Serbia) | FW | Belgrade, SFR Yugoslavia | 10 January 1990 | (Thailand) Muangthong United | |
| 6 | Jan Sobociński | (Poland) | CB | Łódź, Poland | 20 March 1999 | (United States) Charlotte FC | |

=== International players ===
- (Serbia) Stefan Šćepović (men's/U21)
- (Collectivity of Saint Martin) Jean-Baptiste Léo (men's)
- (Greece) Alexandros Lolis (U21)
- (Poland) Jan Sobociński (U21/20)
- (England) Miguel Azeez (U20/19/18/17/16)
- (Uruguay) Federico Gino (U20)
- (Germany) Moritz Heinrich (U20/19)
- (Greece) Vasilis Athanasiou (U19)
- (Greece) Ilias Simantirakis (U19)
- (Greece) Christos Voutsas (U17)
- (England) Kido Taylor-Hart (U17)
- (Slovakia) Matúš Begala (U17)

=== Foreign players ===
EU Nationals
- (Spain) (Europe) Carles Soria
- (Slovakia) (Europe) Matúš Begala
- (Poland) (Europe) Jan Sobociński
- (Germany) (Europe) Moritz Heinrich
- (Germany) (Europe) Tim Rieder

EU Nationals (Dual Citizenship)
- (France) (Collectivity of Saint Martin) (Europe) Jean-Baptiste Léo

Non-EU Nationals
- (Uruguay) Federico Gino
- (Serbia) Stefan Šćepović
- (England) Miguel Azeez
- (England) (Jamaica) Kido Taylor-Hart

== Personnel ==
=== Management ===
| Position | Staff |
|---|---|
| Majority Owner | Panagiotis & Giannis Christovasilis |
| President and CEO | Panagiotis Christovasilis |
| Vice President | Giannis Christovasilis |
| Members | Giorgos Ioannou |
| Members | Dimitrios Noutsis |
| Amateur club member | Giorgos Oikonomou |

=== Administration Department ===
| Position | Staff |
|---|---|
| Head of Ticket Department | Andreas Potsis |
| Press & Media Office | Vasilis Thodoris |
| Marketing Office | |

=== Football Department ===
| Position | Staff |
|---|---|
| Director of Football | Kostas Palaiologos (until 6 February 2025) |
| Team Manager | Giorgos Dasios |

=== Coaching staff ===
| Position | Name |
|---|---|
| Head Coach | René Poms (until 21 October 2024) Vagelis Tziarras ct (from 21 October 2024 until 27 October 2024) Ariel Galeano (from 26 October 2024 until 6 February 2025) Nikos Badimas (from 6 February 2025) |
| Assistant Coach | Dino Škvorc (until 21 October 2024)David Meza (from 26 October 2024 until 6 February 2025) |
| Coach | Vagelis Tziarras |
| Fitness Coach | Dimitris Charisis Alejandro Martin Foglia (from 26 October 2024 until 6 February 2025) |
| Goalkeepers Coach | Philipp Martin (until 28 January 2025) Dimitris Charisis (from 28 January 2025 until 17 February 2025) Stathis Kandilaptis (from 17 February 2025) |
| Analyst | Robin Krasniqi (until 21 October 2024) Miguel Angel Lara Fragnaud (from 26 October 2024 until 6 February 2025) |

=== Medical staff ===
| Position | Name |
|---|---|
| Head doctor | Stavros Restanis |
| Doctor | Giannis Baltogiannis |
| Physio | Filippos Skordos |

=== Academy ===
| Position | Name |
|---|---|
| Director of Youth Development | |
| General Manager | |
| Head Coach U-19 | Alekos Tatsis |
| Head Coach U-17 | Christos Raptis |
| Head Coach U-15 | |
| Fitness Coach | |
| Goalkeepers Coach | |

== Transfers ==
=== Summer ===
==== In ====
| No | Pos | Player | Transferred from | Fee | Date | Source |
|---|---|---|---|---|---|---|
| 8 | MF | Alexandros Lolis | Giouchtas | Loan return | 1 July 2024 | |
| 32 | DM / CM | Angelos Tsiris | Giouchtas | Loan return | 1 July 2024 | |
| 25 | RB | Xenofon Panos | Kozani | Free | 22 July 2024 | |
| 27 | W | Moritz Heinrich | DSV Leoben | Free | 23 July 2024 | |
| 40 | DM | Tim Rieder | 1860 Munich | Free | 25 July 2024 | |
| 72 | RB | Konstantinos Lampsias | Panathinaikos B | Loan | 30 July 2024 | |
| 5 | DM | Christos Voutsas | Panathinaikos B | Free | 20 August 2024 | |
| 44 | CB | Alexandros Doumas | Pallavreotikos | Free | 29 August 2024 | |
| 4 | CM / AM | Miguel Azeez | Atlético Baleares | Free | 31 August 2024 | |
| 1 | GK | Panagiotis Ginis | Egnatia | Free | 2 September 2024 | |
| 88 | CM / RLW | Alexandros Nikolias | Levadiakos | Free | 2 September 2024 | |
| 9 | FW | Vasilios Mantzis | Asteras Tripolis | Free | 3 September 2024 | |
| 38 | CB | Panagiotis Kafenzis | PAS Giannina U-19 | Promotion | 5 September 2024 | |
| 80 | LB | Tasos Loupas | PAS Giannina U-19 | Promotion | 5 September 2024 | |
| 70 | AM | Orestis Kalemi | PAS Giannina U-19 | Promotion | 5 September 2024 | |
| 77 | RB / WRB | Vasilis Athanasiou | PAS Giannina U-19 | Promotion | 5 September 2024 | |
| 14 | FW | Stefan Šćepović | Muangthong United | Free | 7 September 2024 | |

==== Out ====
| No | Pos | Player | Transferred to | Fee | Date | Source |
|---|---|---|---|---|---|---|
| 55 | GK | Boris Klaiman | Retired | Released | 16 May 2024 | |
| 11 | FW | Kevin Rosero | Necaxa | 200,000 | 17 June 2024 | |
| 4 | CB | Epaminondas Pantelakis | Panetolikos | Released | 18 June 2024 | |
| 5 | DM / CM | Zisis Karachalios | OFI Crete | 100,000 | 27 June 2024 | |
| 10 | W | Juan Garro | Huracán | End of loan | 30 June 2024 | |
| 21 | AM | Panagiotis Tzimas | PAOK | End of loan | 30 June 2024 | |
| 3 | LB | Marios Tsaousis | PAOK | End of loan | 30 June 2024 | |
| 22 | RB / MR | Jordi Osei-Tutu | VfL Bochum | End of loan | 30 June 2024 | |
| 77 | LW | Mete Kaan Demir | Eyüpspor | End of loan | 30 June 2024 | |
| 80 | CM | Angelos Liasos | Panserraikos | End of contract | 30 June 2024 | |
| 64 | GK | Vasilis Soulis | Niki Volos | End of contract | 30 June 2024 | |
| 91 | FW | Claudiu Bălan | FC U Craiova | End of contract | 30 June 2024 | |
| 14 | FW | Georgios Pamlidis | Aris | End of contract | 30 June 2024 | |
| 1 | GK | Gergely Nagy | | End of contract | 30 June 2024 | |
| 8 | LW | Santiago Rosales | | End of contract | 30 June 2024 | |
| 23 | DM / CM | Daan Rienstra | Kalamata | End of contract | 30 June 2024 | |
| 24 | RB / MR | Konstantinos Panagou | Panachaiki | End of contract | 30 June 2024 | |
| 9 | FW | Pedro Conde | Volos | End of contract | 30 June 2024 | |
| 15 | CB | Rodrigo Erramuspe | Levadiakos | Released | 1 July 2024 | |
| 30 | LB | Giannis Kiakos | Wisła Kraków | Released | 1 July 2024 | |

=== Winter ===
==== In ====
| No | Pos | Player | Transferred from | Fee | Date | Source |
|---|---|---|---|---|---|---|
| 10 | FW | Kido Taylor-Hart | - | Free | 12 January 2025 | |
| 20 | RB | Vasilis Kaperdas | GS Ilioupolis | Free | 20 January 2025 | |
| 12 | LB | Ilias Simantirakis | OFI | Loan | 30 January 2025 | |
| 42 | CB | Fotios Gogas | PAS Giannina U-19 | Promotion | 30 January 2025 | |
| 90 | FW | Nikos Tzovaras | PAS Giannina U-19 | Promotion | 30 January 2025 | |

==== Out ====
| No | Pos | Player | Transferred to | Fee | Date | Source |
|---|---|---|---|---|---|---|
| 7 | DM / CM | Federico Gino | A.E. Kifisia | End of contract | 31 December 2024 | |
| 72 | RB | Konstantinos Lampsias | | Released | 2 January 2025 | |
| 2 | RB | Carles Soria | Lamia | Disclosed | 29 January 2025 | |
| 10 | FW | Kido Taylor-Hart | Zemplín Michalovce | Released | 6 February 2025 | |
| 14 | FW | Stefan Šćepović | | Released | 14 February 2025 | |
| 6 | CB | Jan Sobociński | | Released | 27 March 2025 | |

== Pre-season and friendlies ==
Win Draw Loss Upcoming fixture

| 4 August 2024 Friendly | PAS Giannina | 1-0 | KF Bylis | Ioannina |
| 18:30 | Orestis Kalemi 72' | Report | | Stadium: Zosimades Stadium; Referee: Dimitris Chatzipanagiotou |

| 11 August 2024 Friendly | Panetolikos | 0-0 | PAS Giannina | Agrinio |
| 19:00 | | Report | | Stadium: Panetolikos Stadium; Referee: Panagiotis Zigas |

| 14 August 2024 Friendly | PAS Giannina | 1-1 | Egaleo | Karpenisi |
| 17:00 | Vasilis Athanasiou 64' | Report | Daviotis 12' | Stadium: DAK Karpenisi; Referee: Giorgos Drosinis |

| 21 August 2024 Friendly | A.E. Kifisia | 2–1 | PAS Giannina | Kaisariani |
| 18:00 | Sbokos 82'; Pavlos Pantelidis 84' | Report | Sobociński 72' | Stadium: Michalis Kritikopoulos Stadium |

| 24 August 2024 Friendly | Anagennisi Arta | 0–3 | PAS Giannina | Arta |
| 18:30 | | Report | Léo 64', 90+1'; Orestis Kalemi 89' | Stadium: Arta Stadium; Referee: Thodoros Karagiannis |

| 28 August 2024 Friendly | Panachaiki | 1-0 | PAS Giannina | Agyia, Patras |
| 18:00 | Kozoronis 44' (pen.) | Report | | Stadium: Kostas Davourlis Stadium; Referee: Nikos Chronas |

| 31 August 2024 Friendly | PAS Giannina | 2-0 | Thesprotos | Ioannina |
| 17:30 | Gino 35' (pen.); Heinrich 44' | Report | | Stadium: Zosimades Stadium; Referee: Nikolaos Magioros |

== Competitions ==
=== Super League 2 ===
==== League table ====
| Pos | Team | Pld | W | D | L | GF | GA | GD | Pts | Promotion or relegation (Note: PAOK B is ineligible for promotion.) |
|---|---|---|---|---|---|---|---|---|---|---|
| 1 | AEL | 18 | 15 | 3 | 0 | 37 | 9 | +28 | 48 | Qualification for the Play-off round |
| 2 | Iraklis | 18 | 11 | 3 | 4 | 31 | 14 | +17 | 36 | Qualification for the Play-off round |
| 3 | PAS Giannina | 18 | 8 | 7 | 3 | 23 | 21 | +2 | 31 | Qualification for the Play-off round |
| 4 | Makedonikos | 18 | 8 | 3 | 7 | 24 | 22 | +2 | 27 | Qualification for the Play-off round |
| 5 | Kampaniakos | 18 | 7 | 5 | 6 | 25 | 26 | −1 | 26 | Qualification for the Play-off round |

Source: sl2.gr
Rules for classification: 1) Points; 2) Head-to-head points; 3) Head-to-head goal difference; 4) Goal difference; 5) Goals scored; 6) Goals against; 7) Play-offs (neutral ground); 8) Draw.
(Note: Criteria 7 is only used if needed to decide champion, teams for relegation).

=== Results ===
| Home \ Away | AEL | DIA | ENK | IRA | KAM | KAV | MAK | NKV | PKB | PAS |
|---|---|---|---|---|---|---|---|---|---|---|
| AEL | — | 3–0 | 1–0 | 3–0 | 3–0 | 2–1 | 2–0 | 3–0 | 2–1 | 1–1 |
| Diagoras | 0–1 | — | 0–0 | 0–4 | 0–1 | 1–1 | 0–0 | 0–0 | 1–0 | 0–0 |
| Ethnikos Neo Keramidi | 1–3 | 0–0 | — | 0–1 | 0–0 | 0–1 | 1–2 | 0–2 | 2–3 | 0–1 |
| Iraklis | 1–2 | 1–0 | 1–0 | — | 5–0 | 1–1 | 3–0 | 2–1 | 2–0 | 3–1 |
| Kampaniakos | 0–2 | 1–0 | 3–0 | 3–3 | — | 3–1 | 1–1 | 2–0 | 1–3 | 2–2 |
| Kavala | 0–3 | 0–0 | 0–0 | 0–1 | 0–2 | — | 1–0 | 1–1 | 0–1 | 2–4 |
| Makedonikos | 0–1 | 3–1 | 2–1 | 0–2 | 1–0 | 4–2 | — | 0–0 | 3–1 | 3–1 |
| Niki Volos | 3–3 | 0–1 | 2–2 | 1–0 | 2–2 | 2–0 | 0–3 | — | 1–1 | 1–1 |
| PAOK B | 0–1 | 1–2 | 0–1 | 0–0 | 1–3 | 3–0 | 2–1 | 0–4 | — | 4–0 |
| PAS Giannina | 1–1 | 2–1 | 1–0 | 2–1 | 2–1 | 0–0 | 3–1 | 0–0 | 1–0 | — |

Source: sl2.gr
Legend: Blue = home team win; Yellow = draw; Red = away team win.
For upcoming matches, an "a" indicates there is an article about the rivalry between the two participants.

The draw for the Play-off and Play-out rounds took place on 14 February 2025, with first matches played on 23 February 2025.

=== Play-off round ===
In the play-offs, the first five teams in the first phase's standings participated, and they competed twice with the rest, at home and away to decide the North Group's Champion who was also promoted to next year's Super League 1. They included 10 matchdays and 8 matches for each team. The teams entered with half of the points they had won in the first phase. <onlyinclude>

=== Results ===
The draw for the Play-off and Play-out rounds took place on 14 February 2025, with first matches to be played on 22 February 2025.

=== Play-off round ===
In the play-offs, the first five teams in the first phase's standings participated, and they competed twice with the rest, at home and away to decide the South Group's Champion who was also promoted to next year's Super League 1. They included 10 matchdays and 8 matches for each team. The teams entered with half of the points they had won in the first phase. <onlyinclude>

==== Results summary ====
| Overall | | | | | | | | Home | | | | | | Away | | | | | |
| Pld | W | D | L | GF | GA | GD | Pts | W | D | L | GF | GA | GD | W | D | L | GF | GA | GD |
|---|---|---|---|---|---|---|---|---|---|---|---|---|---|---|---|---|---|---|---|
| 18 | 8 | 7 | 3 | 23 | 21 | +2 | 31 | 6 | 3 | 0 | 12 | 5 | +7 | 2 | 4 | 3 | 11 | 16 | −5 |

==== Fixtures ====
Win Draw Loss Upcoming fixture

| 21 September 2024 1 | Ethnikos Neo Keramidi | 0-1 | PAS Giannina | Katerini |
| 17:00 | Georgios Krimitzas (yellow card) 90+2' | Report | Gino 68' (pen.); Gino (yellow card) 70'; Sobociński (yellow card) 77' | Stadium: Katerini Stadium; Referee: Konstantinos Tikozoglou |

| 28 September 2024 2 | PAS Giannina | 2–1 | Iraklis | Ioannina |
| 15:00 | Mantzis 16', 65'; Vasilis Athanasiou (yellow card) 23'; Mantzis (yellow card) 30'; Soria (yellow card) 39'; Sobociński (yellow card) 56'; Gino (yellow card) 69'; Begala (yellow card) 88'; Athanasiou (yellow card) 90+5' | Report | Tsirigotis 44'; Doukouré (yellow card) 83' | Stadium: Zosimades Stadium; Referee: Alexandros Dragatis |

| 6 October 2024 3 | PAS Giannina | 0-0 | Niki Volos | Ioannina |
| 15:00 | | Report | Selimaj (yellow card) 40'; Litenas (yellow card) 73'; Juan Manuel Arias (yellow card) 76' | Stadium: Zosimades Stadium; Referee: Giorgos Drakidis |

| 13 October 2024 4 | Makedonikos | 3-1 | PAS Giannina | Efkarpia |
| 15:00 | Alexandros Zafirakis 7'; Pedro Lucas (yellow card) 41'; Leonidopoulos (yellow card) 73'; Miguel Tavares 83' (pen.); Tsoukanis (yellow card) 84'; Christos Almyras (yellow card) 88'; Santiago Ramírez Montoya 90' | Report | Gino (yellow card) 44'; Panos (yellow card) 57'; Bakadimas (yellow card) 82'; Gino 90+2'; Nikolias (yellow card) 90+5' | Stadium: Makedonikos Stadium; Referee: Aristidis Aliagas |

| 18 October 2024 5 | PAS Giannina | 2–1 | Kampaniakos | Ioannina |
| 17:00 | Mantzis 35'; Begala (yellow card) 41'; Heinrich (yellow card) 68'; Mantzis (yellow card) 75'; Sobociński 90+1' | Report Report | Filimon Frosinis 9'; Filimon Frosinis (yellow card) 26'; Shehu (yellow card) 29'; Kollaras (yellow card) 35' | Stadium: Zosimades Stadium; Referee: Giorgos Balachoutis |

| 27 October 2024 6 | PAOK B | 4-0 | PAS Giannina | Efkarpia |
| 12:00 | Kottas (yellow card) 12'; Hurtado 1', 54'; Kanis 30' (pen.); Giorgos Lagonidis 77' | Report | Sobociński (yellow card) 27'; Mantzis (yellow card) 38' | Stadium: Makedonikos Stadium; Referee: Konstantinos Perrakis |

| 3 November 2024 7 | PAS Giannina | 2–1 | Diagoras | Ioannina |
| 12:00 | Begala (yellow card) 23'; Šćepović (yellow card) 35'; Sobociński (yellow card) 37'; Šćepović 52'; Azeez (red card) 59'; Nikolias 90'; Heinrich (yellow card) 90+2' | Report | Rakip Bregu 18'; Dimopoulos (yellow card) 35'; Manolakis (yellow card) 67' | Stadium: Zosimades Stadium; Referee: Konstantinos Bairaktaris |

| 10 November 2024 8 | Kavala | 2-4 | PAS Giannina | Kavala |
| 12:00 | Spanoudakis 40'; Papadopoulos 90+2' | Report | Nikolias 5', 62'; Šćepović 16'; Lolis 45+1'; Athanasiou (yellow card) 71' | Stadium: Anthi Karagianni Stadium; Referee: Thomas Bourouzikas |

| 16 November 2024 9 | AEL | 1-1 | PAS Giannina | Larissa |
| 15:00 | Pasas 31'; Ahmed-Lavrentis Kossonou (yellow card) 83' | Report | Mantzis 54'; Gino (yellow card) 85' (yellow-red card) 85'; Lolis (yellow card) 86' (yellow-red card) 90+3' | Stadium: AEL FC Arena; Referee: Dimitris Kefalas |

| 22 November 2024 10 | PAS Giannina | 1–0 | Ethnikos Neo Keramidi | Ioannina |
| 16:00 | Šćepović 81'; Alexandros Doumas (yellow card) 59'; Heinrich (yellow card) 89' | Report | Athanasios Fokaidis (yellow card) 45+3'; Dimitris Kligopoulos (yellow card) 81' | Stadium: Zosimades Stadium; Referee: Panteleimon Tzamoutzantonis |

| 30 November 2024 11 | Iraklis | 3-1 | PAS Giannina | Thessaloniki |
| 15:00 | Miranda (yellow card) 9'; Bertoglio 34'; Tsirigotis 43'; Kushta 47' | Report | Nikolias (yellow card) 32'; Sobociński (yellow card) 40'; Mantzis (yellow card) 42'; Heinrich 51' | Stadium: Kaftanzoglio Stadium; Referee: Panagiotis Koukoulas |

| 7 December 2024 12 | Niki Volos | 1-1 | PAS Giannina | Volos |
| 15:00 | Vasco Gadelho (yellow card) 31'; Vlachos (yellow card) 49'; Ed Carlos (yellow card) 67'; Silva 76'; Tzioras (yellow card) 90+9' | Report | Lolis (yellow card) 15'; Heinrich (yellow card) 49'; Rieder 52' | Stadium: Niki Volos Stadium-Pantelis Magoulas; Referee: Meletios Gioumatzidis |

| 14 December 2024 13 | PAS Giannina | 3–1 | Makedonikos | Ioannina |
| 17:00 | Šćepović 4'; Rieder (yellow card) 43'; Soria (yellow card) 59'; Mantzis 65', 70'; Begala (yellow card) 71'; Léo (yellow card) 80'; Mina (yellow card) 89' | Report | Nika Sikharulashvili 22'; Pedro Lucas (yellow card) 37' | Stadium: Zosimades Stadium; Referee: Ioannis Andrikopoulos |

| 20 December 2024 14 | Kampaniakos | 2-2 | PAS Giannina | Chalastra |
| 15:00 | Rafail Pettas 20', 54'; Konstantinos koltsidas (yellow card) 60'; Kollaras (yellow card) 72'; Rafail Pettas (yellow card) 83'; Doumanis (yellow card) 86' | Report | Šćepović 48'; Bakadimas (yellow card) 65'; Azeez 67'; Léo (yellow card) 87' | Stadium: Kampaniakos Stadium; Referee: Alexandros Megas |

| 13 January 2025 15 | PAS Giannina | 1–0 | PAOK B | Ioannina |
| 17:30 | Panos 37'; Léo (yellow card) 62'; Šćepović (yellow card) 64'; Athanasiou (yellow card) 90+2' | Report | Kottas (yellow card) 20'; Filon (yellow card) 21'; Georgios Lagonidis (yellow card) 78'; Grosdis (yellow card) 89' | Stadium: Zosimades Stadium; Referee: Vasilis Stamos |

| 18 January 2025 16 | Diagoras | 0-0 | PAS Giannina | Rhodes |
| 13:00 | Rakip Bregu (yellow card) 23'; Nikolis (yellow card) 69'; Alex Aguado (yellow card) 87' | Report | Sobociński (yellow card) 42'; Heinrich (yellow card) 67'; Taylor-Hart (yellow card) 76' | Stadium: Diagoras Stadium; Referee: Ioannis Andrikopoulos |

| 25 January 2025 17 | PAS Giannina | 0–0 | Kavala | Ioannina |
| 15:00 | Rieder (yellow card) 12'; Panos (yellow card) 15'; Nikolias (yellow card) 16'; Bakadimas (yellow card) 62' | Report | Christos Lelekas (yellow card) 15'; Katsoulidis (yellow card) 47'; Shota Kverenchkhiladze (yellow card) 57'; Kosmas Gekas (yellow card) 63' | Stadium: Zosimades Stadium; Referee: Konstantinos Perrakis |

| 1 February 2025 18 | PAS Giannina | 1–1 | AEL | Ioannina |
| 15:00 | Kyrkos 50'; Léo (yellow card) 53'; Taylor-Hart (yellow card) 70'; Azeez (yellow card) 86' | Report | Moutinho 15'; Papageorgiou (yellow card) 25' | Stadium: Zosimades Stadium; Referee: Ioannis Andrikopoulos |

=== Play-off round ===
==== Results summary ====
| Overall | | | | | | | | Home | | | | | | Away | | | | | |
| Pld | W | D | L | GF | GA | GD | Pts | W | D | L | GF | GA | GD | W | D | L | GF | GA | GD |
|---|---|---|---|---|---|---|---|---|---|---|---|---|---|---|---|---|---|---|---|
| 8 | 2 | 3 | 3 | 12 | 17 | −5 | 9 | 2 | 1 | 1 | 7 | 5 | +2 | 0 | 2 | 2 | 5 | 12 | −7 |

=== Fixtures ===
Win Draw Loss Upcoming fixture

| 1 March 2025 2 | Makedonikos | 3-1 | PAS Giannina | Efkarpia |
| 15:00 | Alexandros Zafirakis 15'; Matheus Zanella (yellow card) 45'; Feyzi Hasanoglou 47'; Kouiroukidis (yellow card) 78'; Kouiroukidis 89' (pen.) | Report | Nikolias (yellow card) 45+2'; Azeez (yellow card) 54'; Lolis (yellow card) 57'; Heinrich 67' (pen.); Begala (yellow card) 86' | Stadium: Makedonikos Stadium; Referee: Vasilis Fitsas |

| 9 March 2025 3 | PAS Giannina | 1–1 | AEL | Ioannina |
| 11:45 | Heinrich (yellow card) 26'; Heinrich 38' (pen.); Begala (yellow card) 81'; Athanasiou (yellow card) 90+2' | Report | Moraitis 15'; Pasas (yellow card) 20'; Tachatos (yellow card) 22'; Ahmed-Lavrentis Kossonou (yellow card) 24' | Stadium: Zosimades Stadium; Referee: Konstantinos Kechagias |

| 15 March 2025 4 | Iraklis | 2-2 | PAS Giannina | Thessaloniki |
| 15:00 | Kushta 16'; Tsirigotis 45+1' (pen.) | Report | Alexandros Doumas (yellow card) 45'; Heinrich 63'; Bakadimas (yellow card) 74'; Panagiotis Kafenzis (yellow card) 90+1'; Mantzis 90+3' | Stadium: Kaftanzoglio Stadium; Referee: Fotis Polychronis |

| 23 March 2025 5 | PAS Giannina | 4–1 | Kampaniakos | Ioannina |
| 11:45 | Heinrich 4', 61'; Vasilis Kaperdas (yellow card) 13'; Begala (yellow card) 51'; Mantzis 75'; Vasilis Athanasiou 83' | Report | Rafail Pettas 7'; Stathis Sarvanidis (yellow card) 68' | Stadium: Zosimades Stadium; Referee: Giorgos Koukourakis |

| 6 April 2025 7 | PAS Giannina | 2–0 | Makedonikos | Ioannina |
| 11:45 | Heinrich 8', 58' (pen.); Bakadimas (yellow card) 75' | Report | Leonidopoulos (yellow card) 55'; Stelios Kazelis (yellow card) 57'; Matheus Zanella (yellow card) 71' | Stadium: Zosimades Stadium; Referee: Ioannis Andrikopoulos |

| 12 April 2025 8 | AEL | 5-0 | PAS Giannina | Larissa |
| 15:00 | Pasas 15', 38', 71'; Siatravanis 50'; Ikonomou 63'; Papageorgiou (yellow card) 90' | Report | Mantzis (yellow card) 90' | Stadium: AEL FC Arena; Referee: Giorgos Alabeis |

| 27 April 2025 9 | PAS Giannina | 0–3 | Iraklis | Ioannina |
| 14:45 | Heinrich (yellow card) 13' | Report | Tsirigotis 18'; Diamantis 24'; Miranda (yellow card) 70'; Belmonte 90+1' | Stadium: Zosimades Stadium; Referee: Vasilis Chorozoglou |

| 3 May 2025 10 | Kampaniakos | 2-2 | PAS Giannina | Chalastra |
| 14:45 | Giannis Voskopoulos 49'; Pavlos Eppas 51' | Report | Heinrich 43'; Alexandros Doumas (yellow card) 48'; Begala 82' | Stadium: Kampaniakos Stadium; Referee: Panteleimon Tzamoutzantonis |

=== Greek Cup ===
==== Matches ====
| 8 September 2024 Second round | Spartakos Graikochori | 0-11 | PAS Giannina | Igoumenitsa |
| 16:30 | Petros Mokas (yellow card) 87' | Report | Heinrich 3', 29', 60', 63'; Bakadimas 15'; Gino 28', 40'; Soria 49', 51'; Léo 82'; Nikolias 90' | Stadium: Municipal Stadium of Igoumenitsa; Referee: Konstantinos Kechagias |

| 15 September 2024 Third round | A.E. Ermionida | 0-7 | PAS Giannina | Kranidi |
| 16:30 | Klajdi Mehmetaj (yellow card) 51'; Adiol Mamutaj (yellow card) 53'; Noah Mavrommatis (yellow card) ?' | Report | Soria 14'; Gino 33' (pen.), 54' (pen.); Heinrich (yellow card) 42'; Vasilis Athanasiou (yellow card) 43'; Bakadimas (yellow card) 52'; Šćepović 73', 82'; Nikolias 83'; Rieder (yellow card) 89'; Heinrich 90+3' | Stadium: Municipal Stadium of Kranidi; Referee: Ioannis Routsis |

| 25 September 2024 Fourth round | PAS Giannina | 0-2 | Panachaiki | Ioannina |
| 16:00 | Sobociński (yellow card) 61' | Report | Rubén de Tomás 35' (pen.), 64'; Traoré (yellow card) 44'; Rubén de Tomás (yellow card) 61'; Stojanović (yellow card) 90+1' | Stadium: Zosimades Stadium; Attendance: Behind closed doors Referee: Dimitris Kefalas |

== Statistics ==
=== Appearances ===
| No. | Pos. | Nat. | Name | Greek Super League 2 | Greek Cup | Total |
| No. | Pos. | Nat. | Name | Apps | Apps | Apps |
|---|---|---|---|---|---|---|
| 1 | GK | (Greece) | Panagiotis Ginis | 5 | 0 | 5 |
| 2 | RB | (Spain) | Carles Soria | 16 | 3 | 19 |
| 4 | CM / AM | (England) | Miguel Azeez | 14 | 1 | 15 |
| 5 | DM | (Greece) | Christos Voutsas | 0 | 2 | 2 |
| 6 | CB | (Poland) | Jan Sobociński | 15 | 3 | 18 |
| 7 | DM / CM | (Uruguay) | Federico Gino | 8 | 3 | 11 |
| 8 | MF | (Greece) | Alexandros Lolis | 20 | 0 | 20 |
| 9 | FW | (Greece) | Vasilios Mantzis | 23 | 1 | 24 |
| 10 | FW | (England) (Jamaica) | Kido Taylor-Hart | 4 | 0 | 4 |
| 11 | FW | (France) (Collectivity of Saint Martin) | Jean-Baptiste Léo | 16 | 3 | 19 |
| 12 | LB | (Greece) | Ilias Simantirakis | 1 | 0 | 1 |
| 14 | FW | (Serbia) | Stefan Šćepović | 16 | 2 | 18 |
| 16 | DM / CM / AM | (Slovakia) | Matúš Begala | 21 | 3 | 24 |
| 19 | AM / FW | (Greece) | Iason Kyrkos | 16 | 0 | 16 |
| 20 | RB | (Greece) | Vasilis Kaperdas | 7 | 0 | 7 |
| 21 | LB | (Greece) | Dimitris Naoumis | 3 | 0 | 3 |
| 22 | FW | (Greece) | Leonid Mina | 18 | 0 | 18 |
| 25 | RB | (Greece) | Xenofon Panos | 22 | 2 | 24 |
| 27 | W | (Germany) | Moritz Heinrich | 25 | 3 | 28 |
| 32 | DM / CM | (Greece) | Angelos Tsiris | 0 | 0 | 0 |
| 38 | CB | (Greece) | Panagiotis Kafenzis | 7 | 1 | 8 |
| 40 | DM | (Germany) | Tim Rieder | 26 | 3 | 29 |
| 42 | CB | (Greece) | Fotios Gogas | 4 | 0 | 4 |
| 44 | CB | (Greece) | Alexandros Doumas | 12 | 1 | 13 |
| 45 | CB | (Greece) | Gerasimos Bakadimas | 21 | 3 | 24 |
| 70 | AM | (Greece) | Orestis Kalemi | 7 | 2 | 9 |
| 72 | RB | (Greece) | Konstantinos Lampsias | 0 | 1 | 1 |
| 74 | GK | (Greece) | Thomas Vrakas | 2 | 0 | 2 |
| 77 | RB / WRB | (Greece) | Vasilis Athanasiou | 13 | 3 | 16 |
| 80 | LB | (Greece) | Tasos Loupas | 7 | 3 | 10 |
| 88 | CM / RLW | (Greece) | Alexandros Nikolias | 19 | 2 | 21 |
| 90 | FW | (Greece) | Nikos Tzovaras | 1 | 0 | 1 |
| 99 | GK | (Greece) | Vasilis Athanasiou | 19 | 3 | 22 |

=== Goalscorers ===
| No. | Pos. | Nat. | Name | Greek Super League 2 | Greek Cup | Total |
| No. | Pos. | Nat. | Name | Goals | Goals | Goals |
|---|---|---|---|---|---|---|
| 27 | W | (Germany) | Moritz Heinrich | 9 | 5 | 14 |
| 9 | FW | (Greece) | Vasilios Mantzis | 8 | 0 | 8 |
| 14 | FW | (Serbia) | Stefan Šćepović | 5 | 2 | 7 |
| 7 | DM / CM | (Uruguay) | Federico Gino | 2 | 4 | 6 |
| 88 | CM / RLW | (Greece) | Alexandros Nikolias | 3 | 2 | 5 |
| 2 | RB | (Spain) | Carles Soria | 0 | 3 | 3 |
| 6 | CB | (Poland) | Jan Sobociński | 1 | 0 | 1 |
| 8 | MF | (Greece) | Alexandros Lolis | 1 | 0 | 1 |
| 40 | DM | (Germany) | Tim Rieder | 1 | 0 | 1 |
| 4 | CM / AM | (England) | Miguel Azeez | 1 | 0 | 1 |
| 25 | RB | (Greece) | Xenofon Panos | 1 | 0 | 1 |
| 19 | AM / FW | (Greece) | Iason Kyrkos | 1 | 0 | 1 |
| 77 | RB / WRB | (Greece) | Vasilis Athanasiou | 1 | 0 | 1 |
| 16 | DM / CM / AM | (Slovakia) | Matúš Begala | 1 | 0 | 1 |
| 45 | CB | (Greece) | Gerasimos Bakadimas | 0 | 1 | 1 |
| 11 | FW | (France) (Collectivity of Saint Martin) | Jean-Baptiste Léo | 0 | 1 | 1 |

=== Clean sheets ===
| No. | Pos. | Nat. | Name | Greek Super League 2 | Greek Cup | Total |
| No. | Pos. | Nat. | Name | CS | CS | CS |
|---|---|---|---|---|---|---|
| 1 | GK | (Greece) | Panagiotis Ginis | 2 (5) | 0 (0) | 2 (5) |
| 74 | GK | (Greece) | Thomas Vrakas | 0 (2) | 0 (0) | 0 (2) |
| 99 | GK | (Greece) | Vasilis Athanasiou | 5 (19) | 2 (3) | 7 (22) |

=== Disciplinary record ===
| S | P | N | Name | Super League 2 | | | Play offs | | | Greek Cup | | | Total | | |
| S | P | N | Name | Yellow card | Yellow-red card | Red card | Yellow card | Yellow-red card | Red card | Yellow card | Yellow-red card | Red card | Yellow card | Yellow-red card | Red card |
|---|---|---|---|---|---|---|---|---|---|---|---|---|---|---|---|
| 2 | RB | (Spain) | Carles Soria | 2 | 0 | 0 | 0 | 0 | 0 | 0 | 0 | 0 | 2 | 0 | 0 |
| 4 | CM / AM | (England) | Miguel Azeez | 1 | 0 | 1 | 1 | 0 | 0 | 0 | 0 | 0 | 2 | 0 | 1 |
| 6 | CB | (Poland) | Jan Sobociński | 6 | 0 | 0 | 0 | 0 | 0 | 1 | 0 | 0 | 6 | 0 | 0 |
| 7 | DM / CM | (Uruguay) | Federico Gino | 3 | 1 | 0 | 0 | 0 | 0 | 0 | 0 | 0 | 3 | 1 | 0 |
| 8 | MF | (Greece) | Alexandros Lolis | 1 | 1 | 0 | 1 | 0 | 0 | 0 | 0 | 0 | 2 | 1 | 0 |
| 9 | FW | (Greece) | Vasilios Mantzis | 4 | 0 | 0 | 1 | 0 | 0 | 0 | 0 | 0 | 5 | 0 | 0 |
| 10 | FW | (England) (Jamaica) | Kido Taylor-Hart | 2 | 0 | 0 | 0 | 0 | 0 | 0 | 0 | 0 | 2 | 0 | 0 |
| 11 | FW | (France) (Collectivity of Saint Martin) | Jean-Baptiste Léo | 4 | 0 | 0 | 0 | 0 | 0 | 0 | 0 | 0 | 4 | 0 | 0 |
| 14 | FW | (Serbia) | Stefan Šćepović | 2 | 0 | 0 | 0 | 0 | 0 | 0 | 0 | 0 | 2 | 0 | 0 |
| 16 | DM / CM / AM | (Slovakia) | Matúš Begala | 4 | 0 | 0 | 3 | 0 | 0 | 0 | 0 | 0 | 7 | 0 | 0 |
| 20 | RB | (Greece) | Vasilis Kaperdas | 0 | 0 | 0 | 1 | 0 | 0 | 0 | 0 | 0 | 1 | 0 | 0 |
| 22 | FW | (Greece) | Leonid Mina | 1 | 0 | 0 | 0 | 0 | 0 | 0 | 0 | 0 | 1 | 0 | 0 |
| 25 | RB | (Greece) | Xenofon Panos | 2 | 0 | 0 | 0 | 0 | 0 | 0 | 0 | 0 | 2 | 0 | 0 |
| 27 | W | (Germany) | Moritz Heinrich | 5 | 0 | 0 | 3 | 0 | 0 | 1 | 0 | 0 | 9 | 0 | 0 |
| 38 | CB | (Greece) | Panagiotis Kafenzis | 0 | 0 | 0 | 1 | 0 | 0 | 0 | 0 | 0 | 1 | 0 | 0 |
| 40 | DM | (Germany) | Tim Rieder | 2 | 0 | 0 | 0 | 0 | 0 | 1 | 0 | 0 | 3 | 0 | 0 |
| 44 | CB | (Greece) | Alexandros Doumas | 1 | 0 | 0 | 2 | 0 | 0 | 0 | 0 | 0 | 3 | 0 | 0 |
| 45 | CB | (Greece) | Gerasimos Bakadimas | 3 | 0 | 0 | 2 | 0 | 0 | 1 | 0 | 0 | 6 | 0 | 0 |
| 77 | RB / WRB | (Greece) | Vasilis Athanasiou | 1 | 0 | 0 | 0 | 0 | 0 | 1 | 0 | 0 | 2 | 0 | 0 |
| 88 | CM / RLW | (Greece) | Alexandros Nikolias | 3 | 0 | 0 | 1 | 0 | 0 | 0 | 0 | 0 | 4 | 0 | 0 |
| 99 | GK | (Greece) | Vasilis Athanasiou | 3 | 0 | 0 | 1 | 0 | 0 | 0 | 0 | 0 | 4 | 0 | 0 |
