= 2023–24 PAS Giannina F.C. season =

PAS Giannina
2023–24 season
- Chairman: Panagiotis Christovasilis
- Manager: Athanasios Staikos (until 18 December 2023); Michalis Grigoriou (from 18 December 2023 until 22 April 2024); Giorgos Georgoulopoulos (caretaker, from 22 April 2024 until 11 May 2024)
- Stadium: Zosimades Stadium, Ioannina
- Super League: 14th (relegated)
- Greek Cup: Fifth round eliminated by Volos
Home colours	Away colours	Third colours

The 2023–24 season is PAS Giannina F.C.'s 28th competitive season in the top flight of Greek football, 13th season in the Super League Greece, and 58th year in existence as a football club. They also compete in the Greek Cup.

== Players ==
Updated 3 February 2024

No.	Name	Nationality	Position(s)	Place of birth	Date of birth	Signed from	Notes
Goalkeepers
1	Gergely Nagy	(Hungary)	GK	Cegléd, Hungary	27 May 1994	(Greece) PAS Lamia	
64	Vasilis Soulis	(Greece)	GK	Patras, Greece	7 December 1994	(Greece) Panachaiki	
74	Thomas Vrakas	(Greece)	GK	Ioannina, Greece	22 July 2004	(Greece) PAS Giannina U19	
99	Vasilios Athanasiou	(Greece)	GK	Aigio, Greece	24 July 1999	(Italy) Mantova	
Defenders
2	Carles Soria	(Spain)	RB	Calaf, Spain	8 October 1996	(Portugal) Estoril	
3	Marios Tsaousis	(Greece)	LB	Thessaloniki, Greece	11 May 2000	(Greece) PAOK	Loan
4	Epaminondas Pantelakis (Vice Captain)	(Greece)	CB	Chania, Crete, Greece	10 February 1995	(Greece) Panathinaikos	
6	Jan Sobociński	(Poland)	CB	Łódź, Poland	20 March 1999	(United States) Charlotte FC	
15	Rodrigo Erramuspe	(Argentina)	CB	Mar del Plata, Argentina	3 May 1990	(Argentina) Belgrano	
22	Jordi Osei-Tutu	(England)	RB / MR	Slough, England	2 October 1998	(Germany) VfL Bochum	Loan
24	Konstantinos Panagou	(Greece)	RB / MR	Athens, Greece	11 June 1998	(Greece) Iraklis	
30	Giannis Kiakos	(Greece)	LB	Bamberg, Germany	14 February 1998	(Greece) Ionikos	
33	Dimitris Naoumis	(Greece)	LB	Ioannina, Greece	3 August 2004	(Greece) PAS Giannina U19	
45	Gerasimos Bakadimas	(Greece)	CB	Xiromero, Greece	6 June 2000	(Greece) Panetolikos	
Midfielders
5	Zisis Karachalios (Third Captain)	(Greece)	DM / CM	Karditsa, Greece	10 January 1996	(Greece) Levadiakos	
7	Federico Gino	(Uruguay)	DM / CM	Melo, Uruguay	26 February 1993	(Argentina) Platense	
8	Santiago Rosales	(Argentina)	LW	Mar del Plata, Argentina	22 March 1995	(Argentina) Mitre	
10	Juan Garro	(Argentina)	W	Mendoza, Argentina	24 November 1992	(Argentina) Huracán	Loan
21	Panagiotis Tzimas	(Greece)	AM	Preveza, Greece	12 March 2001	(Greece) PAOK	Loan
23	Daan Rienstra	(Netherlands)	DM / CM	Alkmaar, Netherlands	6 October 1992	(Greece) Volos	
46	Matúš Begala	(Slovakia)	DM / CM / AM	Stará Ľubovňa, Slovakia	7 April 2001	(Slovakia) Zemplín Michalovce	
70	Iason Kyrkos	(Greece)	AM / FW	Ioannina, Greece	21 March 2003	(Greece) PAS Giannina U19	
77	Mete Kaan Demir	(Turkey) (Germany)	LW	Mainz, Germany	13 May 1998	(Turkey) Eyüpspor	Loan
80	Angelos Liasos	(Greece)	CM	Florina, Greece	26 May 2000	(Greece) PAS Giannina U20	
Forwards
9	Pedro Conde (Captain)	(Spain)	FW	Villafranca, Spain	26 July 1988	(United Arab Emirates) Al Dhafra	
11	Kevin Rosero	(Colombia)	FW	Colombia	3 December 1998	(Greece) Volos	
14	Georgios Pamlidis	(Greece)	FW	Katerini, Greece	13 November 1993	(Greece) Apollon Smyrnis	
17	Jean-Baptiste Léo	(France)	FW	Lyon, France	3 May 1996	(Latvia) Riga	
32	Leonid Mina	(Greece)	FW	Preveza, Greece	28 March 2004	(Germany) SV Werder Bremen II	
91	Claudiu Bălan	(Romania)	FW	Craiova, Romania	22 June 1994	(Romania) FC U Craiova	
Left during Winter Transfer Window
8	Alexandros Lolis	(Greece)	MF	Ladochori Thesprotias, Greece	5 September 2002	(Greece) PAS Giannina U17	
32	Angelos Tsiris	(Greece)	DM / CM	Ioannina, Greece	18 August 2004	(Greece) PAS Giannina U19	
20	Nikolaos Lolis	(Greece)	DM / CM	Ladochori Thesprotias, Greece	20 January 2005	(Greece) PAS Giannina U17	Loan
55	Boris Klaiman	(Israel)	GK	Vinnytsia, Ukraine	26 October 1990	(Greece) Volos	
6	Iker Bilbao	(Spain)	CM	Larrabetzu, Spain	20 March 1996	(Spain) Amorebieta	
25	Gerónimo Bortagaray	(Uruguay)	CB	Salto, Uruguay	5 August 2000	(Uruguay) Danubio FC	
28	Joseph Efford	(United States)	W	Gwinnett County, Georgia, United States	29 August 1996	(Scotland) Motherwell	

=== International players ===
- (Israel) Boris Klaiman (men's, U21/19/18)
- (Hungary) Gergely Nagy (U21/19/18)
- (Greece) Alexandros Lolis (U21)
- (Greece) Zisis Karachalios (U21/19)
- (Greece) Angelos Liasos (U21)
- (Greece) Marios Tsaousis (U21/19/18/17/16)
- (Poland) Jan Sobociński (U21/20)
- (Uruguay) Federico Gino (U20)
- (Greece) Vasilios Athanasiou (U19)
- (Greece) Konstantinos Panagou (U19)
- (Greece) Epaminondas Pantelakis (U19)
- (Turkey) Mete Kaan Demir (U19)
- (Greece) Panagiotis Tzimas (U19/18/17)
- (Slovakia) Matúš Begala (U17/16)

=== Foreign players ===
EU Nationals
- (Spain) (Europe) Pedro Conde
- (Spain) (Europe) Iker Bilbao
- (Spain) (Europe) Carles Soria
- (Netherlands) (Europe) Daan Rienstra
- (France) (Europe) Jean-Baptiste Léo
- (Romania) (Europe) Claudiu Bălan
- (Slovakia) (Europe) Matúš Begala
- (Hungary) (Europe) Gergely Nagy
- (Poland) (Europe) Jan Sobociński

EU Nationals (Dual Citizenship)
- (Turkey) (Germany) (Europe) Mete Kaan Demir

Non-EU Nationals
- (Argentina) Rodrigo Erramuspe
- (Argentina) Juan Garro
- (Argentina) Santiago Rosales
- (Colombia) Kevin Rosero
- (Uruguay) Federico Gino
- (Uruguay) Gerónimo Bortagaray
- (Israel) Boris Klaiman
- (United States) Joseph Efford
- (England) Jordi Osei-Tutu

== Personnel ==
=== Management ===
Position	Staff
Majority Owner	Panagiotis & Giannis Christovasilis
President and CEO	Panagiotis Christovasilis
Vice President	Giannis Christovasilis
Members	Giorgos Ioannou
Members	Dimitrios Noutsis
Amateur club member	Giorgos Oikonomou

=== Administration Department ===
Position	Staff
Head of Ticket Department	Andreas Potsis
Press & Media Office	Vasilis Thodoris
Marketing Office	Kostas Pediaditakis (Until 29 August 2023)

=== Football Department ===
Position	Staff
Director of Football	Dimitris Niarchakos (Until 4 March 2024)
Team Manager	Babis Karvelis

=== Coaching staff ===
Position	Name
Head Coach	Athanasios Staikos (until 18 December 2023) Michalis Grigoriou (from 18 December 2023 until 22 April 2024) Giorgos Georgoulopoulos ct (from 22 April 2024 until 11 May 2024)
Assistant Coach	Dimitris Lontos (until 18 December 2023) Nikos Panagiotaras (from 18 December 2023 until 22 April 2024) Giorgos Georgoulopoulos (from 28 December 2023 until 22 April 2024) Anastasios Anthimiadis (from 22 April 2024)
Fitness Coach	Ioannis Dourountos (until 18 December 2023) Giannis Georgiadis (from 18 December 2023 until 22 April 2024) Dimitris Charisis (from 22 April 2024)
Goalkeepers Coach	Dimitris Diamantis (until 18 December 2023) Kostas Paganias (from 18 December 2023)
Analyst	Dimitris Lontos (until 18 December 2023) Nikos Iosifidis (from 18 December 2023 until 22 April 2024)

=== Medical staff ===
Position	Name
Head doctor	Stavros Restanis
Doctor	Giannis Baltogiannis
Physio	Filippos Skordos

=== Academy ===
Position	Name
Director of Youth Development	Giorgos Ioannou
General Manager	Lefteris Douskos
Head Coach U19	Anastasios Anthimiadis
Head Coach U17	Giannis Lolis
Head Coach U15	Christos Raptis
Fitness Coach	Dimitris Charisis
Goalkeepers Coach	Nikos Gortzis (until 18 December 2023)

== Transfers ==
=== Summer ===
==== In ====
No	Pos	Player	Transferred from	Fee	Date	Source
22	FW	Leonid Mina	SV Werder Bremen II	Loan return	2 June 2023	
-	LB	Giannis Rizos	Thesprotos	Loan return	2 June 2023	
20	DM / CM	Nikolaos Lolis	Olympiacos	Loan	25 June 2023	
55	GK	Boris Klaiman	Volos	Free	1 July 2023	
46	DM / CM / AM	Matúš Begala	Zemplín Michalovce	Free	15 July 2023	
24	RB / MR	Konstantinos Panagou	Iraklis	Free	16 July 2023	
21	AM	Panagiotis Tzimas	PAOK	Loan	22 July 2023	
10	W	Juan Garro	Huracán	Loan	9 August 2023	
33	LB	Dimitris Naoumis	PAS Giannina U19	Promoted	11 August 2023	
3	LB	Marios Tsaousis	PAOK	Loan	16 August 2023	
28	W	Joseph Efford	Motherwell	Free	16 September 2023	

==== Out ====
No	Pos	Player	Transferred to	Fee	Date	Source
3	LB	Stavros Pilios	AEK Athens	Disclosed	30 May 2023	
21	AM	Panagiotis Tzimas	PAOK	End of loan	1 June 2023	
7	W / FW	Ahmad Mendes Moreira	AEL Limassol	End of contract	3 June 2023	
20	DM / CM	Nikolaos Lolis	Olympiacos	Disclosed	25 June 2023	
22	RB	Angelos Tsavos		Released	29 June 2023	
24	LB	Andrei Radu		Released	29 June 2023	
74	AM	Labros Moustakas	AEK Athens	End of contract	30 June 2023	
16	GK	Panagiotis Tsintotas	Atromitos	End of contract	13 June 2023	
88	FW	Apostolos Stamatelopoulos	Newcastle Jets	Released	7 July 2023	
10	AM	Sotiris Ninis	A.E. Kifisia	Released	13 July 2023	
-	LB	Giannis Rizos		Released	10 August 2023	
18	W	Manssour Fofana		Released	13 September 2023	

=== Winter ===
==== In ====
No	Pos	Player	Transferred from	Fee	Date	Source
22	RB / MR	Jordi Osei-Tutu	VfL Bochum	Loan	22 January 2024	
1	GK	Gergely Nagy	PAS Lamia	Free	24 January 2024	
8	LW	Santiago Rosales	Mitre	Free	30 January 2024	
6	CB	Jan Sobociński	Charlotte FC	Free	30 January 2024	
77	LW	Mete Kaan Demir	Eyüpspor	Loan	30 January 2024	

==== Out ====
No	Pos	Player	Transferred to	Fee	Date	Source
8	MF	Alexandros Lolis	Giouchtas	Loan	5 January 2024	
20	DM / CM	Nikolaos Lolis	Olympiacos	End of loan	8 January 2024	
32	DM / CM	Angelos Tsiris	Giouchtas	Loan	12 January 2024	
55	GK	Boris Klaiman	Chania	Loan	23 January 2024	
6	CM	Iker Bilbao	Alcorcón	Released	23 January 2024	
25	CB	Gerónimo Bortagaray		Released	29 January 2024	
28	W	Joseph Efford		Released	30 January 2024	

== Pre-season and friendlies ==
Win Draw Loss Upcoming fixture

24 July 2023 Friendly	PAS Giannina	1-1	Hapoel Ironi Kiryat Shmona	Białobrzegi
19:00	Tzimas 90+2' (pen.)	Report	? 75'	Stadium: Stadion Miejski im. Zygmunta Siedleckiego; Referee: unknown

26 July 2023 Friendly	PAS Giannina	11-0	Radomiak Radom	Warka
19:00	Conde 26' (pen.), 37'; Pantelakis 32'; Pamlidis 43'; Gino 44' (pen.); Kyrkos 49', 66'; Tzimas 52', 58'; Léo 56'; A. Lolis 85'	Report		Stadium: Sielenka Stadium; Referee: unknown

24 July 2023 Friendly	MKS Cracovia	0-0	PAS Giannina	Nowiny
16:30	Jugas (yellow card) 46'; Bartlomiej Kolec (yellow card) 90+2'	Report	Gino (yellow card) 17'; Liasos (yellow card) 69'; Soria (yellow card) 71'	Stadium: Stadion w Nowinach; Referee: unknown

4 August 2023 Friendly	PAS Giannina	1-1	Panserraikos	Ioannina
19:00	Conde 61'	Report	Aleksić 41'	Stadium: Zosimades Stadium; Referee: unknown

12 August 2023 Friendly	PAS Giannina	1-2	Panetolikos	Ioannina
19:00	Conde 36'	Report Report	Baldassarra 43'; Tsingaras (yellow card) 58'; Mladen (yellow card) 70'; Karelis 76'	Stadium: Zosimades Stadium; Referee: Michalis Matsoukas

== Competitions ==
=== Super League 1 ===
==== League table ====
Pos	Team	Pld	W	D	L	GF	GA	GD	Pts	Qualification or relegation
10	OFI	26	5	10	11	26	44	−18	25	Qualification for the Play-out round
11	A.E. Kifisia	26	4	9	13	31	56	−25	21	Qualification for the Play-out round
12	Panetolikos	26	4	8	14	26	46	−20	20	Qualification for the Play-out round
13	Volos	26	4	7	15	24	52	−28	19	Qualification for the Play-out round
14	PAS Giannina	26	3	9	14	25	48	−23	18	Qualification for the Play-out round

Source: Super League Greece
Rules for classification: 1) Points; 2) Head-to-head points; 3) Head-to-head goal difference; 4) Goal difference; 5) Goals scored; 6) Play-offs (neutral ground).
(Note: Criterion 6 is only used if needed to decide champion, teams for relegation or teams for UEFA competitions).

==== Results summary ====
Overall								Home						Away					
Pld	W	D	L	GF	GA	GD	Pts	W	D	L	GF	GA	GD	W	D	L	GF	GA	GD
26	3	9	14	25	48	−23	18	2	5	6	11	19	−8	1	4	8	14	29	−15

==== Fixtures ====
Win Draw Loss Upcoming fixture

19-20 August 2023 1	PAS Giannina	3–0	A.E. Kifisia	Ioannina
20:00	Conde 31' (pen.), 53'; Karachalios (yellow card) 55' (yellow-red card) 82'; Tsaousis (yellow card) 90+5'; Garro 90+8'	Report	Šakić (yellow card) 12'; Ipalibo (yellow card) 16'; Masouras (yellow card) 54'; Ožegović (yellow card) 90+6'	Stadium: Zosimades Stadium; Attendance: 2.562; Referee: Athanasios Tzilos
Note: The match was originally scheduled for 19 August. The match interrupted in half time. It finished at the next day.

25 August 2023 2	Panetolikos	0-0	PAS Giannina	Agrinio
21:00	Karelis (yellow card) 49'	Report	Erramuspe (yellow card) 29'; Tzimas (yellow card) 53'; Pamlidis (yellow card) 73'; Gino (yellow card) 86'	Stadium: Panetolikos Stadium; Attendance: 1.683; Referee: Konstantinos Katoikos

3 September 2023 3	PAS Giannina	0–1	Panathinaikos	Ioannina
21:45	Erramuspe (yellow card) 21'; Tsaousis (yellow card) 29'; Tzimas (yellow card) 34'; Soria (yellow card) 86'; Gino (yellow card) 90'; Klaiman (yellow card) 90+5'	Report	Mladenović (yellow card) 72'; Palacios 74'; Vilhena (yellow card) 81'	Stadium: Zosimades Stadium; Attendance: 2.927; Referee: Christos Vergetis

17 September 2023 4	Asteras Tripolis	2-2	PAS Giannina	Tripoli
15:00	Álvarez 21'; Regis 45+3'; Regis (yellow card) 50'; Diarra (yellow card) 62'	Report	Tzimas 16'; Bălan 28'; Tzimas (yellow card) 36'; Bălan (yellow card) 85'; Tsaousis (yellow card) 90+1'	Stadium: Theodoros Kolokotronis; Attendance: 1.369; Referee: Andreas Gamaris

24 September 2023 5	PAS Giannina	1-3	PAOK	Ioannina
20:30	Pamlidis 25'; Kiakos (yellow card) 70'; Erramuspe (yellow card) 72'; Pamlidis (yellow card) 76'; Liasos (yellow card) 79'	Report	Konstantelias 4', 33'; Kędziora (yellow card) 37'; Živković 77'; Živković (yellow card) 79'	Stadium: Zosimades Stadium; Attendance: 2.360; Referee: Agelos Evangelou

28 September 2023 6	Panserraikos	3-2	PAS Giannina	Serres
17:30	Pileas 9' (pen.); Staikos 32'; Mourgos (yellow card) 54'; Ouédraogo (yellow card) 73'; Aleksić 90'; Aleksić (yellow card) 90+1'; Maskanakis (yellow card) 90+4'; Sofianos (yellow card) 90+8'	Report	Pantelakis 11'; Pantelakis (yellow card) 45+2'; Tsaousis 62'; A. Lolis (yellow card) 78'; Gino (yellow card) 89'; Karachalios (red card) 90+6'	Stadium: Serres Municipal Stadium; Attendance: 1.154; Referee: Efstathios Gortsilas

1 October 2023 7	PAS Giannina	0–3	Olympiacos	Ioannina
20:30	Liasos (yellow card) 14'; Tzimas (yellow card) 43'; Iker Bilbao (yellow card) 45+2'	Report	Podence 17', 23'; Alexandropoulos (yellow card) 40'; Porozo (yellow card) 49'; Rodinei 90+1'	Stadium: Zosimades Stadium; Attendance: 2.916; Referee: Evangelos Manouhos

20 October 2023 8	Lamia	2-1	PAS Giannina	Lamia
20:30	Rubén Martínez 8'; Sidcley (yellow card) 33'; Longo 37'; Koșelev (yellow card) 90+1'; Acuña (yellow card) 90+5'	Report	Erramuspe 18'; Soria (yellow card) 32'; Gino (yellow card) 33'; Erramuspe (yellow card) 74'	Stadium: Lamia Municipal Stadium; Attendance: 1.780; Referee: Andreas Gamaris

29 October 2023 9	Aris	2–0	PAS Giannina	Thessaloniki
20:30	Fabiano (yellow card) 15'; Suleymanov (yellow card) 45+2'; Suleymanov 55'; Morón (yellow card) 72'; Zamora 75'; Verstraete (yellow card) 80'	Report	Gino (yellow card) 45+2' (yellow-red card) 61'	Stadium: Kleanthis Vikelidis Stadium; Attendance: 5.917; Referee: Evangelos Manouhos

5 November 2023 10	PAS Giannina	1-1	Volos	Ioannina
17:30	Soria (yellow card) 19'; Conde (yellow card) 38'; Kiakos 50'; Kiakos (yellow card) 51'; Pantelakis (yellow card) 71'; Liasos (yellow card) 76'	Report	Deletić (yellow card) 38'; Kalogeropoulos (yellow card) 52'; Comba 73'	Stadium: Zosimades Stadium; Attendance: 2.113; Referee: Anastasios Sidiropoulos

11 November 2023 11	OFI	1–1	PAS Giannina	Heraklion, Crete
17:30	Marinakis 1'; Vouros (yellow card) 72'; Neira (yellow card) 79'	Report	Tzimas (yellow card) 21'; Erramuspe (yellow card) 60'; Erramuspe 86'	Stadium: Theodoros Vardinogiannis; Attendance: 4.062; Referee: Aristidis Vatsios

26 November 2023 12	PAS Giannina	0–1	AEK Athens	Ioannina
17:00	Rienstra (yellow card) 86'; Erramuspe (yellow card) 90+6'; Pantelakis (yellow card) 90+6'	Report	Zuber 7'; Callens (yellow card) 81'	Stadium: Zosimades Stadium; Attendance: 3.269; Referee: Aristotelis Diamantopoulos

3 December 2023 13	Atromitos	1–1	PAS Giannina	Peristeri, Athens
17:30	Robail 64'; Camara (yellow card) 66'; Tzavellas (yellow card) 73'; De Bock (yellow card) 84'; Vergos (yellow card) 90+3'	Report	Rosero (yellow card) 41'; Pantelakis (yellow card) 69'; Erramuspe 87' (pen.)	Stadium: Peristeri Stadium; Attendance: 1.716; Referee: Fotios Polyxronis

16 December 2023 14	A.E. Kifisia	4–2	PAS Giannina	Kaisariani
17:30	Ožegović 6', 90+2'; Mateus Santos 11'; Mateus Santos (yellow card) 25'; Parras (yellow card) 28'; Landre 34'; Papasavvas (yellow card) 59'	Report	Rosero 10'; Pantelakis 23'; Karachalios (yellow card) 40'; Pantelakis (yellow card) 41'; Garro (yellow card) 47' (yellow-red card) 77'; Tsaousis (yellow card) 73'	Stadium: Michalis Kritikopoulos Stadium; Attendance: Behind closed doors Referee: Efstathios Gortsilas

21 December 2023 15	PAS Giannina	0–0	Panetolikos	Ioannina
15:00	Tsaousis (yellow card) 73'	Report	Baldassarra (yellow card) 53'; Duarte (yellow card) 62'; Mavrias (yellow card) 80' (yellow-red card) 82'	Stadium: Zosimades Stadium; Attendance: Behind closed doors Referee: Konstantinos Perrakis

3 January 2024 16	Panathinaikos	2–0	PAS Giannina	Athens
21:00	Ioannidis 25'; Vilhena 48'; Verbič (yellow card) 68'	Report	Gino (yellow card) 67'	Stadium: Leoforos Stadium; Attendance: Behind closed doors Referee: Panagiotis Rafail Tsiaras

7 January 2024 17	PAS Giannina	2–1	Asteras Tripolis	Ioannina
17:30	Pamlidis 32'; Léo 36'; Tsaousis (yellow card) 90+2'; Tzimas (yellow card) 90+4'	Report	Miritello 10'	Stadium: Zosimades Stadium; Attendance: Behind closed doors Referee: Ioannis Papadopoulos

14 January 2024 18	PAOK	4–0	PAS Giannina	Thessaloniki
20:30	Baba 29'; Meïté 49'; Tzimas 53'; Rienstra 66' (o.g.)	Report		Stadium: Toumba; Attendance: Behind closed doors Referee: Alexandros Tsakalidis

20 January 2024 19	PAS Giannina	0–2	Panserraikos	Ioannina
19:00	Erramuspe (yellow card) 14'; Gino (yellow card) 34'; Tzimas (yellow card) 83'; Pamlidis (yellow card) 88'; Pantelakis (yellow card) 90+5'	Report	Betancor 11', 16'; Warda (yellow card) 14'; Deligiannidis (yellow card) 47'; Dankerlui (yellow card) 52'	Stadium: Zosimades Stadium; Attendance: Behind closed doors Referee: Anastasios Sidiropoulos

28 January 2024 20	Olympiacos	3-1	PAS Giannina	Piraeus
19:30	Ntoi (yellow card) 21'; Ntoi 57'; Navarro 66'; Jovetic 90+3'	Report	Soria (yellow card) 10'; Rienstra (yellow card) 18'; Rosero (yellow card) 54'; Conde 75' (pen.); Karachalios (yellow card) 79'	Stadium: Karaiskakis Stadium; Attendance: Behind closed doors Referee: Konstantinos Perrakis

4 February 2024 21	PAS Giannina	1–4	Lamia	Ioannina
17:30	Karachalios (yellow card) 11'; Pantelakis (yellow card) 32'; Conde 41'; Athanasiou (yellow card) 59'; Tzimas (yellow card) 90+1'; Erramuspe (yellow card) 90+2'	Report	Carlitos 20'; Amaral 22'; Stanko (yellow card) 27'; Slivka (yellow card) 45'; Carlitos (yellow card) 51'; Tsiloulis 62', 81'	Stadium: Zosimades Stadium; Attendance: Behind closed doors Referee: Vasilios Fotias

10 February 2024 22	PAS Giannina	0-0	Aris	Ioannina
19:00	Gino (yellow card) 67'; Erramuspe (yellow card) 69'; Liasos (yellow card) 71'; Nagy (yellow card) 88'	Report	Álvaro Zamora (yellow card) 40'; Kike Saverio (yellow card) 67'	Stadium: Zosimades Stadium; Attendance: Behind closed doors Referee: Aristidis Vatsios

18 February 2024 23	Volos	1–2	PAS Giannina	Volos
15:30	Glavčić (yellow card) 25'; Assehnoun (yellow card) 34'; Assehnoun 47'; de Kamps (yellow card) 65'; García (yellow card) 90+1'; Kalogeropoulos (yellow card) 90+7'	Report	Rosero (yellow card) 7'; Conde 32', 72'; Tutu (yellow card) 45+2'; Soulis (yellow card) 90+4'	Stadium: Panthessaliko Stadium; Attendance: 474; Referee: Anastasios Sidiropoulos

25 February 2024 24	PAS Giannina	2–2	OFI	Ioannina
16:30	Rosero 9'; Conde 20'; Liasos (yellow card) 49'; Conde (yellow card) 57'; Rienstra (yellow card) 77'; Gino (yellow card) 78'	Report	Toral (yellow card) 60'; Bakić 68', 83' (pen.); Vouros (yellow card) 89'; Bakić 68', (yellow card) 90+4'	Stadium: Zosimades Stadium; Attendance: 3.586; Referee: Konstantinos Katoikos

28 February 2024 25	AEK Athens	4-2	PAS Giannina	Nea Filadelfeia
19:00	Szymański 15'; Ponce 69', 79'; Ljubičić 74'	Report	Sobociński 35'; Tzimas (yellow card) 39'; Tzimas 44'; Demir (yellow card) 50'; Soulis (yellow card) 65'; Soria (yellow card) 90'; Begala (yellow card) 90+1'	Stadium: Agia Sophia Stadium; Attendance: 22.523; Referee: Dimitris Maloutas

3 March 2024 26	PAS Giannina	1-1	Atromitos	Ioannina
19:30	Rienstra 37'; Soria (yellow card) 85'	Report	N. Athanasiou (yellow card) 45'; Angielski 58'; Kivrakidis (red card) 74'	Stadium: Zosimades Stadium; Attendance: 3.033; Referee: Aristidis Vatsios

=== Play out round ===
Pos	Team	Pld	W	D	L	GF	GA	GD	Pts	Relegation
10	OFI	33	7	14	12	36	50	−14	35	
11	Atromitos	33	7	13	13	36	53	−17	34	
12	Volos	33	8	9	16	36	58	−22	33	
13	A.E. Kifisia (R)	33	6	10	17	38	68	−30	28	Relegation to Super League 2
14	PAS Giannina (R)	33	4	11	18	33	62	−29	23	Relegation to Super League 2

Source: Super League Greece
Rules for classification: 1) Points; 2) Head-to-head points (Regular season and play-off); 3) Head-to-head goal difference (Regular season and play-off); 4) Regular season position.
(R) Relegated

==== Results summary ====
Overall								Home						Away					
Pld	W	D	L	GF	GA	GD	Pts	W	D	L	GF	GA	GD	W	D	L	GF	GA	GD
33	4	11	18	33	62	−29	23	2	7	7	13	22	−9	2	4	11	20	40	−20

=== Fixtures ===
Win Draw Loss Upcoming fixture

16 March 2024 1	Atromitos	3–2	PAS Giannina	Peristeri, Athens
19:30	Eder González 37'; De Bock (yellow card) 47'; Tzavellas 61'; Vergos 90+5'	Report	Tutu (yellow card) 45+3'; Pamlidis 49'; Erramuspe 85'; Erramuspe (yellow card) 86'	Stadium: Peristeri Stadium; Attendance: 1.252; Referee: Evangelos Manouhos

30 March 2024 2	PAS Giannina	1–1	Panetolikos	Ioannina
19:30	Conde 25'; Tzimas (yellow card) 90+2'	Report	Mladen (yellow card) 32'; Sergio Díaz 70'	Stadium: Zosimades Stadium; Attendance: 2.986; Referee: Stefanos Koubarakis

6 April 2024 3	OFI	4–0	PAS Giannina	Heraklion
20:00	Riera 10', 86'; Baku 45+4'; Iseka 58'	Report	Erramuspe (red card) 26'; Soria (yellow card) 49'; Conde (yellow card) 57'; Sobociński (yellow card) 67'	Stadium: Theodoros Vardinogiannis Stadium; Attendance: 3.754; Referee: Konstantinos Poulikidis

13 April 2024 4	PAS Giannina	0–1	Asteras Tripolis	Ioannina
19:30	Pantelakis (yellow card) 21'; Rosero (yellow card) 38'; Soria (yellow card) 90+2'; Conde (yellow card) 90+5'	Report	Miritello (yellow card) 21'; Kaltsas (yellow card) 52'; Pichu Atienza (yellow card) 72'; Regis (yellow card) 85'; Pichu Atienza 90+3'; Goss (yellow card) 90+5'	Stadium: Zosimades Stadium; Attendance: 1.393; Referee: Andreas Gamaris

21 April 2024 5	Panserraikos	2-1	PAS Giannina	Serres
15:00	Tomás 29'; Warda 45+4' (pen.); Ouédraogo (yellow card) 85'; Avlonitis (yellow card) 90+5'; Warda (yellow card) 90+5'	Report	Erramuspe (yellow card) 41'; Kiakos (yellow card) 42'; Conde 65' (pen.); Karachalios (yellow card) 83'	Stadium: Serres Municipal Stadium; Attendance: 671; Referee: Efstathios Gortsilas

27 April 2024 6	A.E. Kifisia	2–3	PAS Giannina	Kaisariani
20:00	Soloa (yellow card) 17'; Ninis 26'; Vasilios Spinos (yellow card) 42'; Gobeljić (yellow card) 54'; Ožegović 81' (pen.)	Report	Erramuspe (yellow card) 25'; Tzimas (yellow card) 27'; Panagou (yellow card) 34'; Rosero 36', 90+3'; Kyrkos (yellow card) 47'; Begala 74'; Sobociński (yellow card) 81'	Stadium: Michalis Kritikopoulos Stadium; Attendance: 1.214; Referee: Ioannis Papadopoulos

11 May 2024 7	PAS Giannina	1-1	Volos	Ioannina
20:00	Tzimas 56'	Report	Moraitis 59'	Stadium: Zosimades Stadium; Attendance: 940; Referee: Stefanos Koubarakis

=== Greek Cup ===
==== Matches ====
7 October 2023 Fifth round	PAS Giannina	1-2	Volos	Ioannina
15:00	Iker Bilbao (yellow card) 21'; Pantelakis (yellow card) 50'; Erramuspe 86' (pen.); Gino (yellow card) 90+2'; Kiakos (yellow card) 90+3'	Report	García 33', 34'; Glavčić (yellow card) 39'; García (yellow card) 50'; Comba (yellow card) 61'; Siampanis (yellow card) 62'; Bertoglio (yellow card) 85'	Stadium: Zosimades Stadium; Referee: Petros Tsagarakis

== Shirts ==
The club introduced 3 shirts in the summer. They were used for pre-season friendlies and in the beginning of the season. The club introduced 2 more shirts on 17 October 2023.

1st summer	2nd summer	3rd summer	1st October	2nd October

== Statistics ==
=== Appearances ===
No.	Pos.	Nat.	Name	Greek Super League	Greek Cup	Total
No.	Pos.	Nat.	Name	Apps	Apps	Apps
1	GK	(Hungary)	Gergely Nagy	5	0	5
2	RB	(Spain)	Carles Soria	29	0	29
3	LB	(Greece)	Marios Tsaousis	22	1	23
4	CB	(Greece)	Epaminondas Pantelakis	26	1	27
5	DM / CM	(Greece)	Zisis Karachalios	28	1	29
6	CM	(Spain)	Iker Bilbao	2	1	3
6	CB	(Poland)	Jan Sobociński	6	0	6
7	DM / CM	(Uruguay)	Federico Gino	29	1	30
8	MF	(Greece)	Alexandros Lolis	2	1	3
8	LW	(Argentina)	Santiago Rosales	7	0	7
9	FW	(Spain)	Pedro Conde	27	1	28
10	W	(Argentina)	Juan Garro	13	1	14
11	FW	(Colombia)	Kevin Rosero	32	1	33
14	FW	(Greece)	Georgios Pamlidis	27	1	28
15	CB	(Argentina)	Rodrigo Erramuspe	26	1	27
17	FW	(France)	Jean-Baptiste Léo	21	0	21
18	W	(Ivory Coast)	Manssour Fofana	0	0	0
20	MF	(Greece)	Nikolaos Lolis	0	0	0
21	AM	(Greece)	Panagiotis Tzimas	23	1	24
22	RB / MR	(England)	Jordi Osei-Tutu	8	0	8
23	DM / CM	(Netherlands)	Daan Rienstra	27	0	27
24	RB / MR	(Greece)	Konstantinos Panagou	6	1	7
25	CB	(Uruguay)	Gerónimo Bortagaray	1	0	1
28	W	(United States)	Joseph Efford	6	0	6
30	LB	(Greece)	Giannis Kiakos	20	1	21
32	DM / CM	(Greece)	Angelos Tsiris	0	0	0
32	FW	(Greece)	Leonid Mina	2	0	2
33	LB	(Greece)	Dimitris Naoumis	1	0	1
45	CB	(Greece)	Gerasimos Bakadimas	13	0	13
46	DM / CM / AM	(Slovakia)	Matúš Begala	5	0	5
55	GK	(Israel)	Boris Klaiman	19	1	20
64	GK	(Greece)	Vasilios Soulis	5	0	5
70	AM / FW	(Greece)	Iason Kyrkos	4	0	4
74	GK	(Greece)	Thomas Vrakas	0	0	0
77	LW	(Turkey) (Germany)	Mete Kaan Demir	9	0	9
80	CM	(Greece)	Angelos Liasos	18	0	18
91	FW	(Romania)	Claudiu Bălan	20	1	21
99	GK	(Greece)	Vasilios Athanasiou	5	0	5

Super League Greece

=== Goalscorers ===
No.	Pos.	Nat.	Name	Greek Super League	Greek Cup	Total
No.	Pos.	Nat.	Name	Goals	Goals	Goals
9	FW	(Spain)	Pedro Conde	9	0	9
15	CB	(Argentina)	Rodrigo Erramuspe	4	1	5
11	FW	(Colombia)	Kevin Rosero	4	0	4
14	FW	(Greece)	Georgios Pamlidis	3	0	3
21	AM	(Greece)	Panagiotis Tzimas	3	0	3
4	CB	(Greece)	Epaminondas Pantelakis	2	0	2
10	W	(Argentina)	Juan Garro	1	0	1
91	FW	(Romania)	Claudiu Bălan	1	0	1
3	LB	(Greece)	Marios Tsaousis	1	0	1
30	LB	(Greece)	Giannis Kiakos	1	0	1
17	FW	(France)	Jean-Baptiste Léo	1	0	1
6	CB	(Poland)	Jan Sobociński	1	0	1
23	DM / CM	(Netherlands)	Daan Rienstra	1	0	1
46	DM / CM / AM	(Slovakia)	Matúš Begala	1	0	1

Super League Greece

=== Clean sheets ===
No.	Pos.	Nat.	Name	Greek Super League	Greek Cup	Total
No.	Pos.	Nat.	Name	CS	CS	CS
1	GK	(Hungary)	Gergely Nagy	1 (5)	0 (0)	1 (5)
55	GK	(Israel)	Boris Klaiman	3 (19)	0 (1)	3 (20)
64	GK	(Greece)	Vasilios Soulis	0 (5)	0 (0)	0 (5)
74	GK	(Greece)	Thomas Vrakas	0 (0)	0 (0)	0 (0)
99	GK	(Greece)	Vasilios Athanasiou	0 (5)	0 (0)	0 (5)

=== Disciplinary record ===
S	P	N	Name	Super League			Play out			Greek Cup			Total		
S	P	N	Name	Yellow card	Yellow-red card	Red card	Yellow card	Yellow-red card	Red card	Yellow card	Yellow-red card	Red card	Yellow card	Yellow-red card	Red card
1	GK	(Hungary)	Gergely Nagy	1	0	0	0	0	0	0	0	0	1	0	0
2	RB	(Spain)	Carles Soria	6	0	0	2	0	0	0	0	0	8	0	0
3	LB	(Greece)	Marios Tsaousis	6	0	0	0	0	0	0	0	0	6	0	0
4	CB	(Greece)	Epaminondas Pantelakis	7	0	0	1	0	0	1	0	0	9	0	0
5	DM / CM	(Greece)	Zisis Karachalios	3	1	1	1	0	0	0	0	0	4	1	1
6	CM	(Spain)	Iker Bilbao	1	0	0	0	0	0	1	0	0	2	0	0
6	CB	(Poland)	Jan Sobociński	0	0	0	2	0	0	0	0	0	2	0	0
7	DM / CM	(Uruguay)	Federico Gino	8	1	0	0	0	0	1	0	0	9	1	0
8	MF	(Greece)	Alexandros Lolis	1	0	0	0	0	0	0	0	0	1	0	0
9	FW	(Spain)	Pedro Conde	2	0	0	2	0	0	0	0	0	4	0	0
10	W	(Argentina)	Juan Garro	0	1	0	0	0	0	0	0	0	0	1	0
11	FW	(Colombia)	Kevin Rosero	3	0	0	1	0	0	0	0	0	4	0	0
14	FW	(Greece)	Georgios Pamlidis	3	0	0	0	0	0	0	0	0	3	0	0
15	CB	(Argentina)	Rodrigo Erramuspe	9	0	0	3	0	1	0	0	0	12	0	1
21	AM	(Greece)	Panagiotis Tzimas	9	0	0	2	0	0	0	0	0	11	0	0
22	RB / MR	(England)	Jordi Osei-Tutu	1	0	0	1	0	0	0	0	0	2	0	0
23	DM / CM	(Netherlands)	Daan Rienstra	3	0	0	0	0	0	0	0	0	3	0	0
24	RB / MR	(Greece)	Konstantinos Panagou	0	0	0	1	0	0	0	0	0	1	0	0
30	LB	(Greece)	Giannis Kiakos	2	0	0	1	0	0	1	0	0	4	0	0
46	DM / CM / AM	(Slovakia)	Matúš Begala	1	0	0	0	0	0	0	0	0	1	0	0
55	GK	(Israel)	Boris Klaiman	1	0	0	0	0	0	0	0	0	1	0	0
64	GK	(Greece)	Vasilios Soulis	2	0	0	0	0	0	0	0	0	2	0	0
70	AM / FW	(Greece)	Iason Kyrkos	0	0	0	1	0	0	0	0	0	1	0	0
77	LW	(Turkey) (Germany)	Mete Kaan Demir	1	0	0	0	0	0	0	0	0	1	0	0
80	CM	(Greece)	Angelos Liasos	5	0	0	0	0	0	0	0	0	5	0	0
91	FW	(Romania)	Claudiu Bălan	1	0	0	0	0	0	0	0	0	1	0	0
99	GK	(Greece)	Vasilios Athanasiou	1	0	0	0	0	0	0	0	0	1	0	0

== Awards ==
=== Stoiximan Best Goal ===
Matchday	Player
25	Panagiotis Tzimas
Play-out
1st & 2nd	Georgios Pamlidis

=== Player of the club ===
	Name	
1	Pedro Conde	23,88%
2	Panagiotis Tzimas	16,53%
3	Rodrigo Erramuspe	15,34%
4	Marios Tsaousis	9,42%
5	Kevin Rosero	8,79%
6	Georgios Pamlidis	7,91%
7	Zisis Karachalios	5,91%
8	Carles Soria	5,43%
9	Epaminondas Pantelakis	4,55%
10	Federico Gino	2,24%
