= Ben Rienstra =

Dutch footballer (born 1990)

Personal information
- Date of birth: 5 June 1990 (age 36)
- Place of birth: Alkmaar, Netherlands
- Height: 1.82 m (6 ft 0 in)
- Position: Midfielder

Youth career
- Meervogels '31
- ADO '20
- Ajax
- AZ

Senior career*
Years	Team	Apps	(Gls)
2010–2014	Heracles Almelo	108	(2)
2014–2015	PEC Zwolle	37	(6)
2015–2018	AZ	51	(1)
2017–2018	→ Willem II (loan)	30	(10)
2018–2019	Heerenveen	33	(4)
2019–2020	Kayserispor	26	(0)
2020–2022	Fortuna Sittard	58	(5)
2023	Cambuur	4	(0)
2023	DETO		
- * Club domestic league appearances and goals as of 28 May 2023

Ben Rienstra (Dutch pronunciation: [bɛn ˈrinstraː]; born 5 June 1990) is a Dutch former professional footballer who plays as a midfielder.

He formerly played for Heracles Almelo, PEC Zwolle, AZ, Heerenveen, Willem II, Fortuna Sittard and SC Cambuur, before retiring after a spell at DETO. He has played over 300 Eredivisie matches, and has played in the UEFA Europa League.

== Career ==
On 4 May 2014, Rienstra was announced at PEC Zwolle on a two-year contract.

On 27 August 2015, Rienstra was announced at AZ Alkmaar on a five-year contract. He scored his first European goal against Zenit Saint Petersburg on 8 December 2016, scoring in the 7th minute.

In 2017, Rienstra was announced on a one-year loan at Willem II.

On 15 August 2018, Rienstra was announced at SC Heerenveen on a three-year contract.

On 8 August 2019, Rienstra was announced at Kayserispor on a two-year contract.

On 1 September 2020, Rienstra was announced at Fortuna Sittard on a three-year contract. On 9 July 2021, Rienstra was temporarily absent from training after medical tests revealed heart problems.

On 23 January 2023, Rienstra announced he was training with SC Cambuur. On 27 January 2023, Rienstra was announced at SC Cambuur on a permanent transfer.

In 2023, Rienstra was playing for playing for amateur team DETO, and revealed he missed out on signing for Deportivo de La Coruña.

Rienstra finished his career with over 300 Eredivisie appearances, and over 400 career appearances.

== Coaching career ==
After retiring, Rienstra was interning at the FC Twente and Heracles Almelo youth academy.

In July 2025, Rienstra was in talks with clubs to sign on as a youth coach.

== Personal life ==
In October 2017, Rienstra's son and daughter became seriously ill, but they recovered.

His brother is professional football player Daan Rienstra.

== Honours ==
=== Club ===
PEC Zwolle

- Johan Cruyff Shield: 2014
