= 2024–25 Club Necaxa season =

Club Necaxa
2024–25 season
- Manager: Eduardo Fentanes (until 28 October)
- Stadium: Estadio Victoria
- Liga MX Torneo Apertura: 13th
- Leagues Cup: Round of 32
- Top goalscorer: League: Diber Cambindo (2); All: Diber Cambindo (2)
- Biggest win: Necaxa 4–1 Puebla
Home colours	Away colours	Third colours

The 2024–25 season was Club Necaxa's 102nd season in existence and their ninth consecutive appearance in the top flight.

== First-team squad ==
Note: Flags indicate national team as defined under FIFA eligibility rules; some limited exceptions apply. Players may hold more than one non-FIFA nationality.

No.	Pos.	Nation	Player
1	GK	MEX	Raúl Gudiño
2	DF	MEX	Emilio Martínez
3	DF	URU	Agustín Oliveros
4	DF	MEX	Alexis Peña
5	DF	MEX	Alejandro Mayorga
6	DF	MEX	Jesús Alcántar
7	MF	COL	Kevin Rosero
8	MF	ARG	Agustín Palavecino (on loan from River Plate)
10	MF	ARG	José Paradela (on loan from River Plate)
11	MF	MEX	Heriberto Jurado
13	MF	MEX	Alejandro Andrade

No.	Pos.	Nation	Player
15	MF	MEX	Brayan Garnica
16	DF	MEX	Alfredo Gutiérrez
17	MF	MEX	Rogelio Cortéz
18	DF	MEX	Raúl Sandoval
19	MF	MEX	Diego Gómez
21	MF	MEX	Alek Álvarez
22	GK	ARG	Ezequiel Unsain
23	DF	MEX	Alán Montes
27	FW	COL	Diber Cambindo (on loan from Cruz Azul)
30	FW	MEX	Ricardo Monreal
33	MF	USA	Fernando Arce Jr.

=== Out on loan ===
Note: Flags indicate national team as defined under FIFA eligibility rules; some limited exceptions apply. Players may hold more than one non-FIFA nationality.

No.	Pos.	Nation	Player
—	MF	COL	Andrés Colorado (at Atlético Junior)
—	MF	MEX	Misael Domínguez (at Querétaro)
—	MF	MEX	Arturo Palma (at Tapatío)

No.	Pos.	Nation	Player
—	MF	URU	Vicente Poggi (at Godoy Cruz)
—	FW	URU	Facundo Batista (at Peñarol)}
—	FW	MEX	César López (at Juárez)

== Competitions ==
=== Overall record ===
Competition	First match	Last match	Starting round	Record							
Competition	First match	Last match	Starting round	Pld	W	D	L	GF	GA	GD	Win %
Liga MX Apertura	6 July 2024	8 November 2024	Matchday 1	4	1	1	2	5	4	+1	25.00
Leagues Cup	26 July 2024		Group stage	0	0	0	0	0	0	+0	—
Total				4	1	1	2	5	4	+1	25.00

Last updated: 21 July 2024
Source: Soccerway

=== Liga MX ===
==== Torneo Apertura ====
Pos	Team	Pld	W	D	L	GF	GA	GD	Pts
11	León	17	3	9	5	21	23	−2	18
12	Juárez	17	5	2	10	22	36	−14	17
13	Necaxa	17	3	6	8	20	26	−6	15
14	Mazatlán	17	2	8	7	10	19	−9	14
15	Puebla	17	4	2	11	17	31	−14	14

Source: Liga MX
Rules for classification: 1) Points; 2) Goal difference; 3) Number of goals scored; 4) Head-to-head results between tied teams; 5) Number of goals scored away; 6) Highest relegation coefficient; 7) Fair Play points

==== Results summary ====
Overall								Home						Away					
Pld	W	D	L	GF	GA	GD	Pts	W	D	L	GF	GA	GD	W	D	L	GF	GA	GD
4	1	1	2	6	7	−1	4	1	0	1	4	2	+2	0	1	1	2	5	−3

Last updated: 21 July 2024.

==== Results by round ====
Round	1	2	3	4	5
Ground	A	H	H	A	H
Result	L	W	L	D	
Position					

Updated to match(es) played on 21 July 2024. Source:
A = Away; H = Home; W = Win; D = Draw; L = Loss

==== Matches ====
The match schedule was released on 6 June 2024.

6 July 2024 1	Tigres UANL	1–0	Necaxa	Monterrey
19:00 UTC−6	Gignac 19' (pen.)			Stadium: Estadio Universitario; Referee: Vicente Jassiel Reynoso Arce

13 July 2024 2	Necaxa	4–1	Puebla	Aguascalientes
17:00 UTC−6	Palavecino 11'; Cambindo 15', 52'; Rosero 76'		Durán 87'	Stadium: Estadio Victoria; Referee: Abraham de Jesús Quirarte Contreras

17 July 2024 3	Necaxa	0–1	Monterrey	Aguascalientes
19:00 UTC−6	Fernando David Arce (yellow card) 62'; Garnica (yellow card) 79' (red card) 80'; Oliveros (yellow card) 80'		Cortizo 57'; Canales (yellow card) 79'	Stadium: Estadio Victoria; Referee: Jesús Rafael López Valle

21 July 2024 4	León	1–1	Necaxa	León
19:05 UTC−6	Barreiro (yellow card) 31'; Cádiz 63' (pen.); Reyes (yellow card) 69'		Arce 57'; Montes (yellow card) 69'	Stadium: Estadio León; Referee: Luis Alfredo García Rodríguez

24 August 2024 5	Necaxa	v	Juárez	Aguascalientes
				Stadium: Estadio Victoria

=== Leagues Cup ===
==== Group stage ====
Pos	Team	Pld	W	PW	PL	L	GF	GA	GD	Pts	Qualification	NEC	SEA	MIN
1	(Mexican Football Federation) Necaxa	2	1	0	0	1	3	2	+1	3	Advance to knockout stage	—	—	—
2	(United States Soccer Federation) Seattle Sounders FC	2	1	0	0	1	3	3	0	3	Advance to knockout stage	1–3	—	2–0
3	(United States Soccer Federation) Minnesota United FC	2	1	0	0	1	1	2	−1	3		1–0	—	—

Source: Leagues Cup
Rules for classification: Tiebreakers

30 July Group stage	Minnesota United FC (United States)	1–0	(Mexico) Necaxa	St. Paul, United States
8:00 PM CDT	Lod 10' (pen.); Bacharach (red card) 20'; Rosales (yellow card) 66'; St. Clair (yellow card) 77'	Report	Cambindo (yellow card) 17'; Arce (yellow card) 52'	Stadium: Allianz Field; Referee: Sergio Reyna

4 August Group stage	Seattle Sounders FC (United States)	1–3	(Mexico) Club Necaxa	Seattle, United States
7:30 pm PDT	Vargas 8'	Report	Palavecino 24'; Cambindo 44'; Rosero 90+2'	Stadium: Lumen Field

==== Knock stage ====
8 August Round of 32	San Jose Earthquakes (United States)	5–0	(Mexico) Necaxa	San Jose, United States
23:00 ET	Yueill 5'; López 17'; Ebobisse 29', 35'; Marie 88'	Report		Stadium: PayPal Park; Referee: Ismael Cornejo (El Salvador)
