= Agustín Oliveros =

Uruguayan footballer (born 1998)

Personal information
- Full name: Agustín Oliveros Cano
- Date of birth: 17 August 1998 (age 28)
- Place of birth: Montevideo, Uruguay
- Height: 1.82 m (6 ft 0 in)
- Position: Left-back

Team information
- Current team: Necaxa
- Number: 3

Youth career
- Racing Club

Senior career*
Years	Team	Apps	(Gls)
2018–2020	Racing Club	22	(1)
2020–2021	→ Nacional (loan)	37	(1)
2021–	Necaxa	119	(4)

International career
2020	Uruguay U23	6	(0)
2020	Uruguay	1	(0)
- * Club domestic league appearances and goals as of 31 March 2025

Agustín Oliveros Cano (born 17 August 1998) is a Uruguayan professional footballer who plays as a left-back for Liga MX club Necaxa.

== Club career ==
Oliveros is a youth academy graduate of Racing Montevideo. He made his professional debut for the club, on 2 June 2018 in a 2–0 league defeat to Danubio.

On 14 February 2020, Oliveros joined Nacional on loan, signing a 2.5 year contract, when the club acquired 50% of the player's rights.

After winning the 2020 Uruguayan Primera División and getting called up to the Uruguayan national team, on 7 June 2021, he joined Liga MX side Necaxa.

== International career ==
In December 2019, Oliveros was named in Uruguay's squad for the 2020 CONMEBOL Pre-Olympic Tournament.

In November 2020, Oliveros received his first call-up to the senior team. On 17 November 2020, he made his debut in a 2–0 loss to Brazil.

== Career statistics ==
=== Club ===
As of 31 March 2025

Appearances and goals by club, season and competition
Club	Season	League			Continental (Note: Includes appearances in Copa Libertadores and Leagues Cup.)		Total	
Club	Season	Division	Apps	Goals	Apps	Goals	Apps	Goals
Racing	2018	Uruguayan Primera División	5	0	—		5	0
Racing	2019	Uruguayan Primera División	17	1	—		17	1
Racing	Total		22	1	0	0	22	1
Nacional (loan)	2020	Uruguayan Primera División	30	1	7	0	37	1
Necaxa	2021–22	Liga MX	22	0	—		22	0
Necaxa	2022–23	Liga MX	35	3	—		35	3
Necaxa	2023–24	Liga MX	25	0	—		25	0
Necaxa	2024–25	Liga MX	26	0	3	0	29	0
Necaxa	Total		108	3	3	0	111	3
Career total			160	5	10	0	170	5

=== International ===
As of 17 November 2020

Appearances and goals by national team and year
National team	Year	Apps	Goals
Uruguay	2020	1	0
Total		1	0

== Honours ==
Nacional

- Uruguayan Primera División: 2020
