= Aristotelis Kollaras =

Greek footballer (born 1995)

Personal information
- Date of birth: 31 December 1995 (age 30)
- Place of birth: Kavala, Greece
- Height: 1.80 m (5 ft 11 in)
- Position: Left-back

Team information
- Current team: Panthrakikos
- Number: 12

Youth career
- 2013–2015: Skoda Xanthi

Senior career*
Years	Team	Apps	(Gls)
2014–2017	Skoda Xanthi	1	(0)
2015–2016	→ Panargiakos (loan)	22	(0)
2017–2018	Panargiakos	9	(0)
2018–2019	Aittitos Spata	24	(1)
2019–2020	Ionikos	15	(0)
2020–2021	Kavala	14	(0)
2021–2022	Almopos Aridea	38	(1)
2023	Veria	13	(0)
2023–2024	Aiolikos	21	(1)
2024–2025	Kampaniakos	20	(0)
2025–2026	Kavala	21	(0)
2026–	Panthrakikos	0	(0)
- * Club domestic league appearances and goals as of 26 April 2026

Aristotelis Kollaras (Greek: Αριστοτέλης Κολλαράς; born 31 December 1995) is a Greek professional footballer who plays as a left-back for Super League 2 club Panthrakikos.

== Honours ==
Aittitos Spata

- Gamma Ethniki: 2017–18
