= Moritz Heinrich =

German association football player (born 1997)

Personal information
- Full name: Moritz–Andreas Heinrich
- Date of birth: 3 July 1997 (age 29)
- Place of birth: Trudering-Riem, Germany
- Height: 1.80 m (5 ft 11 in)
- Position: Midfielder

Team information
- Current team: SSV Ulm
- Number: 37

Youth career
- –2006: TSV Neubiberg
- 2006–2016: 1860 Munich

Senior career*
Years	Team	Apps	(Gls)
2016–2017	1860 Munich II	28	(2)
2017–2019	Preußen Münster	41	(1)
2019–2021	SpVgg Unterhaching	66	(12)
2021–2022	Würzburger Kickers	22	(0)
2022–2023	SpVgg Bayreuth	32	(0)
2023–2024	DSV Leoben	20	(2)
2024–2025	PAS Giannina	25	(9)
2025–2026	Iraklis	8	(0)
2026–	SSV Ulm	2	(0)

International career
2015	Germany U19	1	(0)
2016	Germany U20	2	(0)
- * Club domestic league appearances and goals as of September 24, 2026

Moritz–Andreas Heinrich (born 3 July 1997) is a German professional association football player who plays as a midfielder for SSV Ulm.

== Club career ==
On 12 June 2019, Heinrich joined SpVgg Unterhaching on a two-year contract.

Ahead of the 2021–22 season, he moved to recently relegated Würzburger Kickers. He made 22 league appearances throughout the season, as the club suffered relegation again. Heinrich left the club after one year.

On 22 June 2022, Heinrich joined recently promoted 3. Liga club SpVgg Bayreuth.
