= Nikolaos Lolis =

Greek professional footballer (born 2005)

Personal information
- Full name: Nikolaos Lolis
- Date of birth: 20 January 2005 (age 21)
- Place of birth: Ladochori Thesprotias, Greece
- Height: 1.87 m (6 ft 2 in)
- Position: Central midfielder

Team information
- Current team: Zakynthos
- Number: 8

Youth career
- 2020–2022: PAS Giannina
- 2024: Olympiacos

Senior career*
Years	Team	Apps	(Gls)
2022–2023	PAS Giannina	1	(0)
2023–2025	Olympiacos	1	(0)
2023–2024	→ PAS Giannina (loan)	0	(0)
2025–2026	Olympiacos B	9	(0)
2026–	Zakynthos	0	(0)

International career^{‡}
2024	Greece U19	3	(0)
- * Club domestic league appearances and goals as of 15 March 2026 ‡ National team caps and goals as of July 2025

Nikolaos Lolis (Greek: Νίκος Λώλης; born 20 January 2005) is a Greek professional footballer who plays as a central midfielder for Super League 2 club Zakynthos.

== Club career ==
Lolis started his football development at PAS Ladochori's youth academy before moving to the youth academy of PAS Giannina. Lolis began his professional career at PAS Giannina, signing a professional contract in September 2022. He made his debut on 13 May 2023 against Levadiakos, coming on as a substitute. Lolis signed for Olympiacos in the summer of 2023 but remained at PAS Giannina on loan. In January 2024, Lolis departed PAS Giannina to join Olympiacos. He featured for the U19 team and was part of the squad that won the UEFA Youth League. He was included in the squad for the 2024 U20 Intercontinental Cup match against Flamengo at the Maracanã. During the 2024–25 season, Lolis was part of the first-team squad, making his debut against OFI on 9 March 2025. He played for Olympiacos B during the 2025–26 season. On 30 September 2026, Lolis signed for Zakynthos on a free transfer.

== Personal life ==
Nikos Lolis is a cousin of Alexandros Lolis.

== Honours ==
Olympiacos Youth

- UEFA Youth League: 2023–24

Olympiacos

- Super League Greece: 2024–25
- Greek Football Cup: 2024–25
