= Athanasios Leonidopoulos =

Greek footballer

Thanasis Leonidopoulos
Personal information
- Full name: Athanasios Leonidopoulos
- Date of birth: 3 June 1996 (age 30)
- Place of birth: Rio, Greece
- Height: 1.85 m (6 ft 1 in)
- Position: Defensive midfielder

Team information
- Current team: Anagennisi Karditsa
- Number: 6

Senior career*
Years	Team	Apps	(Gls)
2014–2019	Ethnikos Piraeus		
2019–2021	Platanias		
2021–2022	Asteras Vlachioti	21	(1)
2022–2025	Makedonikos	68	(3)
2025–	Anagennisi Karditsa	22	(2)
- * Club domestic league appearances and goals as of 20 April 2026

Athanasios 'Thanasis' Leonidopoulos (Greek: Αθανάσιος 'Θανάσης' Λεωνιδόπουλος; born 3 June 1996) is a Greek professional footballer who plays as a defensive midfielder for Super League 2 club Anagennisi Karditsa.
