= Miguel Azeez =

English footballer (born 2002)

Personal information
- Full name: Miguel Adedayo Azeez Beloso
- Date of birth: 20 September 2002 (age 24)
- Place of birth: Camden, England
- Height: 5 ft 11 in (1.81 m)
- Position: Midfielder

Team information
- Current team: Carlisle United
- Number: 6

Youth career
- 2008–2020: Arsenal

Senior career*
Years	Team	Apps	(Gls)
2020–2024	Arsenal	0	(0)
2021–2022	→ Portsmouth (loan)	6	(0)
2022–2023	→ Ibiza (loan)	10	(0)
2023	→ Wigan Athletic (loan)	2	(0)
2024	Atlético Baleares	14	(1)
2024–2025	PAS Giannina	14	(1)
2025–2026	Morecambe	40	(5)
2026–	Carlisle United	12	(2)

International career^{‡}
2018	England U16	5	(1)
2018–2019	England U17	13	(0)
2019	England U18	7	(1)
2019	England U19	1	(0)
2021	England U20	3	(1)
- * Club domestic league appearances and goals as of 26 October 2025 ‡ National team caps and goals as of 11:15, 12 October 2021 (UTC)

Miguel Adedayo Azeez Beloso (born 20 September 2002) is an English professional footballer who plays as a midfielder for National League club Carlisle United.

== Club career ==
Azeez started his career with Arsenal's youth academy at the age of 5. On 24 September 2019, Azeez was given a professional contract by Arsenal. He made his first team debut on 10 December 2020, replacing Joe Willock in the 83rd minute of a 4–2 UEFA Europa League win away to Irish side Dundalk at the Aviva Stadium.

On 30 August 2021, Azeez joined EFL League One club Portsmouth on loan for the remainder of the season. He made his debut for the club on 18 September 2021 against Cambridge United, but was substituted after 59 minutes as Portsmouth lost 2–1. He scored his first goal for the club on 9 November 2021 in an EFL Trophy tie against Crystal Palace U21s. Arsenal recalled Azeez from Portsmouth on 17 January 2022.

On 1 September 2022, Azeez was loaned to Spanish Segunda División side UD Ibiza for the season.

On 10 January 2023, Azeez joined Championship club Wigan Athletic on loan until the end of the season.

=== Atletico Baleares ===
At the end of the 2024 Winter transfer window, Azeez joined Spanish semi-pro Primera Federación side Atlético Baleares in a permanent move after spending over a decade in the Arsenal Academy.

=== PAS Giannina ===
On 31 August 2024, Azeez signed a contract with PAS Giannina.

=== Morecambe ===
On 24 August 2025, Azeez signed for National League club Morecambe.

=== Carlisle United ===
On 19 June 2026, Azeez signed for National League club Carlisle United on a two-year deal for an undisclosed fee.

== International career ==
Azeez was born in England to a Nigerian father and a Spanish mother. Azeez has represented England at under-16, under-17, under-18, under-19 and under-20 levels.

== Personal life ==
Azeez was born in Camden, London, to a Nigerian father and Spanish mother, and grew up in Northwood. His older brother Femi plays as a professional footballer for Brighton & Hove Albion.

== Career statistics ==
As of match played 23 June 2026

Appearances and goals by club, season and competition
Club	Season	League			National Cup		League Cup		Europe		Other		Total	
Club	Season	Division	Apps	Goals	Apps	Goals	Apps	Goals	Apps	Goals	Apps	Goals	Apps	Goals
Arsenal	2020–21	Premier League	0	0	0	0	0	0	1 (Note: Appearance(s) in UEFA Europa League)	0	0	0	1	0
Arsenal U21	2020–21	—	—		—		—		—		3 (Note: Appearance(s) in EFL Trophy)	1	3	1
Arsenal U21	2023–24	—	—		—		—		—		1	0	1	0
Arsenal U21	Total		—		—		—		—		4	1	4	1
Portsmouth (loan)	2021–22	League One	6	0	2	0	0	0	—		2	1	10	1
Ibiza (loan)	2022–23	Segunda División	9	0	1	0	0	0	—		0	0	10	0
Wigan Athletic (loan)	2022–23	Championship	2	0	0	0	0	0	—		0	0	2	0
Atlético Baleares	2023-24	Primera RFEF	5	0	0	0	0	0	—		0	0	5	0
PAS Giannina	2024-2025	Super League Greece 2	14	1	1	0	0	0	—		0	0	15	1
Morecambe	2025–26	National League	40	5	1	0	0	0	—		1	1	42	6
Carlisle United	2026–	National League	12	2	0	0	0	0	—		0	0	0	0
Career total			88	8	5	0	0	0	1	0	7	3	89	9
