= Konstantinos Panagou =

Greek footballer

Personal information
- Date of birth: 11 June 1998 (age 28)
- Place of birth: Athens, Greece
- Height: 1.75 m (5 ft 9 in)
- Position: Right-back

Team information
- Current team: Athens Kallithea
- Number: 21

Youth career
- 2015–2018: Olympiacos
- 2018–2019: → Nottingham Forest (loan)

Senior career*
Years	Team	Apps	(Gls)
2018–2019	Olympiacos	0	(0)
2018–2019	→ Nottingham Forest (loan)	0	(0)
2020	Kalamata	3	(0)
2020–2021	Triglia	17	(0)
2021–2023	Iraklis	55	(0)
2023–2024	PAS Giannina	6	(0)
2024–2025	Panachaiki	18	(0)
2025–	Athens Kallithea	19	(0)

International career^{‡}
2016–2017	Greece U19	4	(0)
- * Club domestic league appearances and goals as of 20 September 2026 ‡ National team caps and goals as of 9 February 2017

Konstantinos Panagou (Greek: Κωνσταντίνος Πανάγου; born 11 June 1998) is a Greek professional footballer who plays as a right-back for Super League 2 club Athens Kallithea.

== Career ==
Panagou signed a contract with PAS Giannina.

== Career statistics ==
As of 17 July 2025

Club	Season	League			Cup		Continental		Other		Total	
Club	Season	Division	Apps	Goals	Apps	Goals	Apps	Goals	Apps	Goals	Apps	Goals
Kalamata	2019–20	Superleague Greece 2	3	0	1	0	—		—		4	0
Triglia	2020–21	Superleague Greece 2	17	0	0	0	—		—		17	0
Iraklis	2021–22	Superleague Greece 2	29	0	2	0	—		—		31	0
Iraklis	2022–23	Superleague Greece 2	26	0	1	0	—		—		27	0
Iraklis	Total		55	0	3	0	—		—		58	0
PAS Giannina	2023–24	Superleague Greece	6	0	1	0	—		—		7	0
Panachaiki	2024–25	Superleague Greece 2	18	0	5	0	—		—		23	0
Career total			99	0	10	0	0	0	0	0	109	0
