= Panagiotis Tzimas =

Greek footballer

Personal information
- Date of birth: 12 March 2001 (age 25)
- Place of birth: Preveza, Greece
- Height: 1.81 m (5 ft 11 in)
- Positions: Attacking midfielder; winger

Team information
- Current team: Niki Volos
- Number: 10

Youth career
- 2015–2019: Asteras Tripolis

Senior career*
Years	Team	Apps	(Gls)
2019–2021	Asteras Tripolis	16	(1)
2021–2024	PAOK B	30	(7)
2022–2024	→ PAS Giannina (loan)	51	(3)
2024–2025	Asteras Tripolis	5	(0)
2024	Asteras Tripolis B	1	(0)
2024–2025	→ A.E. Kifisia (loan)	8	(2)
2025–2026	A.E. Kifisia	9	(0)
2026	→ Iraklis (loan)	7	(0)
2026	Olympiakos Nicosia	0	(0)
2026–	Niki Volos	0	(0)

International career^{‡}
2017–2018	Greece U17	6	(5)
2018	Greece U18	6	(5)
2018–2019	Greece U19	8	(4)
- * Club domestic league appearances and goals as of 27 January 2026 ‡ National team caps and goals as of 23:00, 20 November 2019 (UTC)

Panagiotis Tzimas (Greek: Παναγιώτης Τζίμας; born 12 March 2001) is a Greek professional footballer who plays as a midfielder for Super League 2 club Niki Volos.

== Career ==
On 10 July 2021, Super League Greece club PAOK B announced the signing of Tzimas, who was transferred to PAOK from Asteras Tripolis, with his former club retaining profit percentage rights in a resale of the player by PAOK.

== Career statistics ==
=== Club ===
As of match played 12 May 2024

Club	Season	League			Greek Cup		Total	
Club	Season	Division	Apps	Goals	Apps	Goals	Apps	Goals
Asteras Tripolis	2018–19	Super League Greece	1	0	0	0	1	0
Asteras Tripolis	2019–20	Super League Greece	5	0	0	0	5	0
Asteras Tripolis	2020–21	Super League Greece	10	1	1	0	11	1
Asteras Tripolis	Total		16	1	1	0	17	1
PAOK B	2021–22	Super League Greece 2	30	7	—		30	7
PAS Giannina (loan)	2022–23	Super League Greece	28	0	0	0	28	0
PAS Giannina (loan)	2023–24	Super League Greece	23	3	1	0	24	3
PAS Giannina (loan)	Total		51	3	1	0	52	3
Career total			80	5	2	0	82	5

== Honours ==
A.E. Kifisia

- Super League Greece 2: 2024–25

Iraklis

- Super League Greece 2: 2025–26
