= Taxiarchis Filon =

Greek footballer (born 2005)

Personal information
- Date of birth: 16 March 2005 (age 21)
- Place of birth: Athens, Greece
- Height: 1.77 m (5 ft 10 in)
- Positions: Centre-back; right back

Team information
- Current team: Levadiakos
- Number: 22

Youth career
- –2019: Athlitiki Politia Livadias
- 2019–2023: PAOK

Senior career*
Years	Team	Apps	(Gls)
2023–2025	PAOK B	35	(1)
2025–	Levadiakos	11	(0)

International career^{‡}
2021–2022	Greece U17	5	(1)
2022	Greece U18	3	(0)
2022–2024	Greece U19	13	(1)
2024–	Greece U21	4	(0)
- * Club domestic league appearances and goals as of 3 May 2026 ‡ National team caps and goals as of 31 March 2026

Taxiarchis Filon (Greek: Ταξιάρχης Φίλων; born 16 March 2005 in Livadeia, Greece) is a Greek professional footballer who plays as a centre-back for Super League club Levadiakos.

== Career ==
Filon started his career from the local club Politeia in Levadeia. He transferred to PAOK in 2019 and he won the Greek U-17 Championship in 2022. On 18 December 2024 he made his professional debut with PAOK B, in 1–0 victory against Apollon Pontus. On 11 March 2024 he scored his first professional goal in 4–0 victory against Niki Volos.

== Career statistics ==
As of 26 July 2025

Club	Season	League			Cup		Continental		Other		Total	
Club	Season	Division	Apps	Goals	Apps	Goals	Apps	Goals	Apps	Goals	Apps	Goals
PAOK B	2023–24	Superleague Greece 2	12	1	—		—		—		12	1
PAOK B	2024–25	Superleague Greece 2	23	1	—		—		—		23	1
PAOK B	Total		35	1	—		—		—		35	1
Career total			35	1	0	0	0	0	0	0	35	1
