= Kevin Rosero =

Colombian footballer (born 1998)

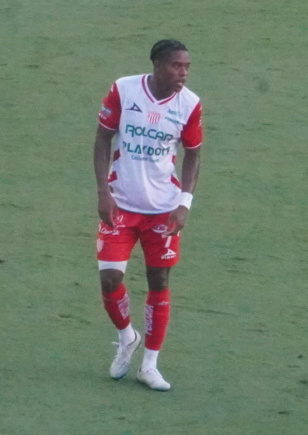
- Rosero with Necaxa in 2025

Personal information
- Full name: Kevin Duvan Ante Rosero
- Date of birth: 3 December 1998 (age 27)
- Place of birth: Bogota, Colombia
- Height: 1.78 m (5 ft 10 in)
- Positions: Forward; winger

Team information
- Current team: Necaxa
- Number: 7

Youth career
- 2017: Porto

Senior career*
Years	Team	Apps	(Gls)
2017–2018	Quarteirense		
2018–2021	Santa Lucia	73	(29)
2021–2022	Volos NPS	28	(6)
2022–2024	PAS Giannina	56	(8)
2024–	Necaxa	57	(5)
- * Club domestic league appearances and goals as of 4 April 2025

Kevin Duvan Ante Rosero (born 3 December 1998) is a Colombian professional footballer who plays as a forward for Liga MX club Necaxa.

== Career ==
Rosero started his career on the Porto academy, before joining Quarteirense in the Portuguese Fifth Division.

On 29 May 2021, Rosero joined Greek club Volos, after spending 3 years playing for Maltese club Santa Lucia.

On 9 June 2022, he joined rival PAS Giannina, signing a three-year contract with the Ioannina club.

On 17 June 2024, he joined Liga MX side Necaxa, signing a three-year contract.

== Career statistics ==
As of 27 March 2025

Club	Season	League			Cup		Continental (Note: Includes appearances in Leagues Cup.)		Total	
Club	Season	Division	Apps	Goals	Apps	Goals	Apps	Goals	Apps	Goals
Santa Lucia	2018–19	Maltese Challenge League	27	9	1	0	—		28	9
Santa Lucia	2019–20	Maltese Premier League	19	2	2	1	—		21	3
Santa Lucia	2020–21	Maltese Premier League	22	15	2	2	—		24	17
Santa Lucia	Total		68	26	5	3	—		73	29
Volos NPS	2021–22	Superleague Greece	26	5	2	1	—		28	6
PAS Giannina	2022–23	Superleague Greece	22	4	1	0	—		23	4
PAS Giannina	2023–24	Superleague Greece	32	4	1	0	—		33	4
PAS Giannina	Total		54	8	2	0	—		56	8
Necaxa	2024–25	Liga MX	24	2	0	0	3	1	27	3
Career total			175	41	9	4	3	1	184	46

== Honours ==
=== Individual ===
- Maltese Premier League Top scorer: 2020–21 (17 goals)
