= Vasilios Katsoulidis =

Greek footballer (born 2002)

Personal information
- Date of birth: 10 April 2002 (age 24)
- Place of birth: Orestiada, Greece
- Height: 1.82 m (6 ft 0 in)
- Position: Right-back

Team information
- Current team: Kavala
- Number: 7

Youth career
- 2009–2016: PAOK
- 2016–2017: Iraklis
- 2017–2021: Aris Thessaloniki

Senior career*
Years	Team	Apps	(Gls)
2021	→ Poseidon Michaniona (loan)	9	(0)
2021–2022	Kozani	22	(0)
2022–2024	Olympiacos B	21	(1)
2024–2025	Panserraikos	0	(0)
2024	→ Diagoras (loan)	2	(0)
2025	→ Kavala (loan)	10	(0)
2025–	Kavala	17	(0)
- * Club domestic league appearances and goals as of 20 April 2026

Vasilios Katsoulidis (Greek: Βασίλειος Κατσουλίδης; born 10 April 2002) is a Greek professional footballer who plays as a right-back for Super League 2 club Kavala.
