= Dimitrios Kottas =

Greek footballer

Personal information
- Date of birth: 14 January 2005 (age 21)
- Place of birth: Thessaloniki, Greece
- Height: 1.90 m (6 ft 3 in)
- Position: Centre-back

Youth career
- 2015–2022: PAOK Academy

International career^{‡}
Years	Team	Apps	(Gls)
2021–2022	Greece U17	10	(0)
2022–2023	Greece U19	15	(0)
- ‡ National team caps and goals as of 21 November 2023

Dimitrios Kottas (Greek: Δημήτριος Κωττάς; born 14 January 2005) is a Greek professional footballer who plays as a centre-back for Super League Greece club PAOK.
