= Konstantinos Lampsias =

Greek footballer

Personal information
- Date of birth: 18 September 2002 (age 24)
- Place of birth: Athens, Greece
- Height: 1.77 m (5 ft 10 in)
- Position: Right-back

Team information
- Current team: A.E. Kifisia
- Number: 74

Youth career
- 2018–2020: Panionios

Senior career*
Years	Team	Apps	(Gls)
2020–2022	Panionios	26	(2)
2022–2023	Terrassa	1	(0)
2023–2024	Panathinaikos B	36	(1)
2024	Panathinaikos	1	(0)
2024	→ PAS Giannina	1	(0)
2025	Mosta	8	(0)
2025–	A.E. Kifisia	1	(0)
- * Club domestic league appearances and goals as of 25 June 2025

Konstantinos Lampsias (Greek: Κωνσταντίνος Λάμψιας; born 18 September 2002) is a Greek professional footballer who plays as a right-back for Super League club A.E. Kifisia.
