= Epaminondas Pantelakis =

Greek footballer

Nontas Pantelakis
Personal information
- Full name: Epaminondas Pantelakis
- Date of birth: 10 February 1995 (age 31)
- Place of birth: Chania, Crete, Greece
- Height: 1.87 m (6 ft 1 1/2 in)
- Position: Centre-back

Team information
- Current team: Panserraikos
- Number: 22

Youth career
- –2010: Aris Souda
- 2010–2013: Ergotelis

Senior career*
Years	Team	Apps	(Gls)
2013–2014	Ergotelis	2	(0)
2014–2018	Olympiacos	0	(0)
2015	→ Fostiras (loan)	3	(0)
2015–2016	→ Kissamikos (loan)	3	(0)
2016–2017	→ Kissamikos (loan)	27	(0)
2017–2018	→ Chania–Kissamikos (loan)	27	(6)
2018–2019	Panathinaikos	4	(0)
2019–2024	PAS Giannina	121	(6)
2024–2025	Panetolikos	25	(1)
2025–2026	AEL	15	(0)
2026–	Panserraikos	3	(0)

International career^{‡}
2013–2014	Greece U19	5	(1)
- * Club domestic league appearances and goals as of 20 September 2026 ‡ National team caps and goals as of 17 July 2014

Epaminondas Pantelakis (Greek: Επαμεινώνδας Παντελάκης, born 10 February 1995) is a Greek professional footballer who plays as a centre-back for Super League 2 club Panserraikos.

== Career ==
Pantelakis was born on 10 February 1995 in Chania. He started his career in Ergotelis and with his jersey debuted in the Super League at the age of 19. In January 2015 he loaned to Fostiras, while in the summer of 2015 Olympiacos signed him and immediately loaned him to Kissamikos, where he remained until the end of his contract in June 2018. On 10 August 2018, he signed a three years' contract with Panathinaikos for an undisclosed fee. On 31 August 2019 PAS Giannina signed him.

== Career statistics ==
As of 23 June 2024

Club	Season	League			Cup		Continental		Other		Total	
Club	Season	Division	Apps	Goals	Apps	Goals	Apps	Goals	Apps	Goals	Apps	Goals
Ergotelis	2013–14	Super League Greece	1	0	0	0	—		—		1	0
Ergotelis	2014–15	Super League Greece	1	0	3	0	—		—		4	0
Ergotelis	Total		2	0	3	0	—		—		5	0
Fostiras (loan)	2014–15	Super League Greece 2	3	0	—		—		—		3	0
Kissamikos (loan)	2015–16	Super League Greece 2	3	0	2	0	—		—		5	0
Kissamikos (loan)	2016–17	Super League Greece 2	27	0	5	0	—		—		32	0
Kissamikos (loan)	Total		30	0	7	0	—		—		37	0
Chania–Kissamikos (loan)	2017–18	Super League Greece 2	27	6	3	0	—		—		30	6
Panathinaikos	2018–19	Super League Greece	4	0	3	0	—		—		7	0
PAS Giannina	2019–20	Super League Greece 2	18	3	4	1	—		—		22	4
PAS Giannina	2020–21	Super League Greece	31	1	5	1	—		—		36	2
PAS Giannina	2021–22	Super League Greece	21	0	1	0	—		—		22	0
PAS Giannina	2022–23	Super League Greece	25	0	1	0	—		—		26	0
PAS Giannina	2023–24	Super League Greece	26	2	1	0	—		—		27	2
PAS Giannina	Total		121	6	12	2	0	0	—		106	8
Career total			187	12	28	2	0	0	0	0	215	14

First total is for Ergotelis.Second total is for Chania and third total is for PAS Giannina.

== Honours ==
PAS Giannina

- Super League Greece 2: 2019–20
