= Xenofon Panos =

Greek footballer

Personal information
- Date of birth: 25 August 1989 (age 37)
- Place of birth: Ioannina, Greece
- Height: 1.77 m (5 ft 9 1/2 in)
- Position: Right-back

Team information
- Current team: Ethnikos Neo Keramidi

Youth career
- 2005–2007: AEK Athens

Senior career*
Years	Team	Apps	(Gls)
2007–2009	AEK Athens	0	(0)
2008–2009	→ Nea Ionia (loan)		
2009	OFI	2	(0)
2010–2012	Panachaiki		
2012–2013	Thrasyvoulos	38	(5)
2013–2015	Panionios	33	(0)
2015–2017	Apollon Smyrnis	56	(0)
2017–2019	Trikala	59	(2)
2019–2020	Chania	12	(3)
2020–2021	Panachaiki	19	(0)
2021–2022	Niki Volos	28	(0)
2022–2024	Kozani	37	(2)
2024–2025	PAS Giannina	22	(1)
2025–	Ethnikos Neo Keramidi		
- * Club domestic league appearances and goals as of 1 August 2025

Xenofon Panos (Greek: Ξενοφών Πάνος; born 25 August 1989) is a Greek professional footballer who plays as a right-back for Gamma Ethniki club Ethnikos Neo Keramidi.
