= Carles Soria =

Spanish footballer

Personal information
- Full name: Carles Soria Grau
- Date of birth: 8 October 1996 (age 30)
- Place of birth: Calaf, Spain
- Height: 1.70 m (5 ft 7 in)
- Position: Right-back

Team information
- Current team: Iraklis
- Number: 30

Youth career
- Gimnàstic Manresa
- 2009–2015: Espanyol

Senior career*
Years	Team	Apps	(Gls)
2015–2017	Espanyol B	62	(4)
2017–2018	AEK Larnaca	8	(1)
2018–2020	Espanyol B	57	(2)
2020–2022	Estoril	45	(0)
2022–2025	PAS Giannina	76	(0)
2025	Lamia	14	(0)
2025–2026	Volos	21	(0)
2026–	Iraklis	5	(0)
- * Club domestic league appearances and goals as of 19 September 2026

Carles Soria Grau (born 8 October 1996) is a Spanish professional footballer who plays as a right-back for Super League Greece club Iraklis.

== Club career ==
Born in Calaf, Barcelona, Catalonia, Soria joined Espanyol's youth setup in 2009, from Gimnàstic Manresa. On 4 June 2015, after finishing his graduation, he was promoted to the reserves in Segunda División B.

Soria made his senior debut on 23 August 2015, replacing Adrián Dalmau in a 1–0 victory against Lleida. His first senior goal came the following 14 February, netting his team's only in a 1–3 home loss Atlético Baleares.

On 4 April 2016, Soria's contract was extended until the end of 2018. On 1 June 2017, he moved abroad for the first time in his career, signing a two-year deal with Cypriot First Division club AEK Larnaca.

Soria made his professional debut on 20 December 2017, coming on as a late substitute for compatriot Joan Tomàs in a 0–0 draw at AEL Limassol. His first goal for the club occurred on 13 May of the following year, in a 3–2 home defeat of the same opponent; late in the month, however, he was released by the club.

On 21 June 2018, Soria returned to Espanyol and its B-team, signing a two-year contract.

=== PAS Giannina ===
In summer 2022 he moved to PAS Giannina in Super League Greece.

== Club statistics ==
As of match played on 5 July 2026

Club	Season	League			National Cup		League Cup		Continental		Other		Total	
Club	Season	Division	Apps	Goals	Apps	Goals	Apps	Goals	Apps	Goals	Apps	Goals	Apps	Goals
Espanyol B	2015–16	Segunda División B	25	1	—		—		—		—		25	1
Espanyol B	2016–17	Segunda División B	37	3	—		—		—		—		37	3
Espanyol B	Total		62	4	—		—		—		—		62	4
AEK Larnaca	2017–18	Cypriot First Division	8	1	4	0	—		2 (Note: Appearances in UEFA Europa League)	0	—		14	1
Espanyol B	2018–19	Segunda División B	32	1	—		—		—		—		32	1
Espanyol B	2019–20	Segunda División B	25	1	—		—		—		—		25	1
Espanyol B	Total		57	2	—		—		—		—		57	2
Estoril	2020–21	Segunda Liga	21	0	6	0	1 (Note: Appearances in Allianz Cup)	0	—		—		28	0
Estoril	2021–22	Primeira Liga	24	0	1	0	1	0	—		—		26	0
Estoril	Total		43	0	7	0	2	0	—		—		54	0
PAS Giannina	2022–23	Superleague Greece	31	0	1	0	—		—		—		32	0
PAS Giannina	2023–24	Superleague Greece	29	0	0	0	—		—		—		29	0
PAS Giannina	2024–25	Superleague Greece 2	16	0	3	3	—		—		—		19	3
PAS Giannina	Total		76	0	4	3	—		—		—		80	3
Lamia	2024–25	Superleague Greece	14	0	0	0	—		—		—		14	0
Volos	2025–26	Superleague Greece	21	0	2	0	—		—		—		23	0
Career total			281	7	17	3	4	0	185	7	4	0	302	10

== Honours ==
AEK Larnaca

- Cypriot Cup: 2017–18

Estoril

- Segunda Liga: 2020–21
