= Marios Tsaousis =

Greek footballer

Personal information
- Date of birth: 11 May 2000 (age 26)
- Place of birth: Thessaloniki, Greece
- Height: 1.72 m (5 ft 8 in)
- Position: Left-back

Team information
- Current team: Panserraikos
- Number: 14

Youth career
- 2008–2010: Iraklis
- 2010–2018: PAOK

Senior career*
Years	Team	Apps	(Gls)
2018–2025	PAOK	18	(0)
2019–2020	→ Volos (loan)	13	(1)
2020–2021	→ Spartak Trnava (loan)	12	(0)
2021–2025	PAOK B	29	(1)
2023–2024	→ PAS Giannina (loan)	22	(1)
2025–	Panserraikos	32	(2)

International career^{‡}
2016–2017	Greece U16	3	(0)
2016–2018	Greece U17	5	(0)
2018	Greece U18	3	(0)
2018–2019	Greece U19	8	(2)
2019–2021	Greece U21	4	(0)
- * Club domestic league appearances and goals as of 14 June 2026 ‡ National team caps and goals as of 3 September 2021

Marios Tsaousis (Greek: Μάριος Τσαούσης; born 11 May 2000) is a Greek professional footballer who plays as a left-back for Super League 2 club Panserraikos.

== Career ==
=== PAOK ===
Tsaousis joined from Iraklis in 2010 and immediately became the leader of the Under-15 (2014-15) team, an Under-17 title-winner, and he was also crowned a champion with the Under-19 squad. He is a fast and creative left-back who can operate just as well in the position of left midfielder. He wore a first team shirt in the friendly with Doxa Drama in 2016, and then was loaned to Volos and Spartak Trnava . He is a Greek youth international with the Under-21 team. Marios Tsaousis will remain a player of PAOK for the next three years, after as announced by Dikefalos, the 21-year-old left back renewed his contract with the team, which will be valid until December 2025. The young defender is playing for PAOK B.
