= Mete Kaan Demir =

Turkish footballer

Personal information
- Date of birth: 13 May 1998 (age 28)
- Place of birth: Mainz, Germany
- Height: 1.70 m (5 ft 7 in)
- Position: Winger

Team information
- Current team: Eyüpspor
- Number: 70

Senior career*
Years	Team	Apps	(Gls)
2016–2019	Hannover 96 II	60	(8)
2019–2022	İstanbul Başakşehir	4	(0)
2019–2020	→ Eskişehirspor (loan)	21	(4)
2021–2022	→ Eyüpspor (loan)	21	(2)
2022–2025	Eyüpspor	26	(2)
2023	→ Gençlerbirliği (loan)	16	(4)
2024	→ PAS Giannina (loan)	9	(0)
2024–2025	→ Gençlerbirliği (loan)	16	(1)
2025	→ Pendikspor (loan)	17	(1)
2025–2026	Sakaryaspor	25	(0)
2026–	Eyüpspor	4	(0)

International career
2016–2017	Turkey U19	9	(1)
- * Club domestic league appearances and goals as of 17 October 2026

Mete Kaan Demir (born 13 May 1998) is a professional footballer who plays as a winger for Turkish Süper Lig club Eyüpspor. Born in Germany, he represented Turkey internationally.

== Career ==
On 31 January 2019, Demir signed his first professional contract with İstanbul Başakşehir for 3.5 years. Demir made his senior debut with Başakşehir in a 2–0 Süper Lig loss to Fatih Karagümrük on 25 September 2020.

=== PAS Giannina ===
On 30 January 2024, Demir was loaned to PAS Giannina with option to buy.
