= Jean-Baptiste Léo =

French footballer (born 1996)

Personal information
- Full name: Jean-Baptiste Philippe Désiré Léo
- Date of birth: 3 May 1996 (age 30)
- Place of birth: Lyon, France
- Height: 1.92 m (6 ft 4 in)
- Position: Forward

Team information
- Current team: Apollon Kalamarias
- Number: 29

Youth career
- –2013: Sochaux

Senior career*
Years	Team	Apps	(Gls)
2013–2017	Sochaux B	62	(0)
2016–2017	Sochaux	0	(0)
2017–2018	AO Chania Kissamikos	28	(8)
2018–2021	PAS Giannina	54	(13)
2021–2022	Riga	21	(4)
2022–2025	PAS Giannina	38	(1)
2025–2026	Panserraikos	1	(0)
2026	→ Niki Volos (loan)	6	(0)
2026–	Apollon Kalamarias	0	(0)

International career^{‡}
2024–	Saint Martin	2	(0)
- * Club domestic league appearances and goals as of 20 April 2026 ‡ National team caps and goals as of 15 October 2024

Jean-Baptiste Philippe Désiré Léo (born 3 May 1996) is a professional footballer who plays as a forward for Super League Greece 2 club Apollon Kalamarias. Born in Metropolitan France, he plays for the Saint Martin national team.

== Club career ==
=== Sochaux ===
Léo's career started with Sochaux.

=== PAS Giannina ===
On 22 May 2018, PAS Giannina officially announced Léo's transfer from AO Chania Kissamikos, until the summer of 2021 for an undisclosed fee. On 15 September 2018, he led PAS Giannina to their first three-point haul of the fledgling Super League season, as they defeated Apollon Smyrnis 2–1 at the Georgios Kamaras Stadium. With the club of Ioannina he won the Football League: 2019–20 and got promoted to the Super League Greece. He scored 10 goals and been the second top scorer together with the team mate Sandi Križman.

=== Riga ===
Léo transferred to Riga FC on 3 March 2021. On 10 June 2022, he was released by the club.

=== Return to PAS Giannina ===
On 26 July 2022, he signed again for PAS Giannina.

== International career ==
Léo being of Saint-Martinois descent, he made his debut for the Saint Martin national team on 12 October 2024 against Saint Lucia national team for the 2024–25 CONCACAF Nations League B.

== Career statistics ==
=== Club ===
As of 1 August 2025

Appearances and goals by club, season and competition
Club	Season	League			Cup		Continental		Other		Total	
Club	Season	Division	Apps	Goals	Apps	Goals	Apps	Goals	Apps	Goals	Apps	Goals
Sochaux B	2013–14	Championnat de France Amateur	5	0	0	0	–		0	0	5	0
Sochaux B	2014–15	Championnat de France Amateur	13	0	0	0	–		0	0	13	0
Sochaux B	2015–16	Championnat de France Amateur	25	0	0	0	–		0	0	25	0
Sochaux B	2016–17	Championnat de France Amateur	19	0	0	0	–		0	0	19	0
Sochaux B	Total		62	0	0	0	–		0	0	62	0
Sochaux	2016–17	Ligue 2	0	0	1 (Note: Appearance in the Coupe de la Ligue)	0	–		0	0	1	0
AO Chania Kissamikos	2017–18	Football League	28	8	1 (Note: Appearance in the Greek Cup)	0	–		0	0	29	8
PAS Giannina	2018–19	Super League Greece	14	1	0	0	–		–		14	1
PAS Giannina	2019–20	Super League Greece 2	20	10	5	0	–		–		25	10
PAS Giannina	2020–21	Super League Greece	20	2	2	1	–		–		22	3
PAS Giannina	Total		54	13	7	1	–		–		61	14
Riga	2021	Latvian Higher League	21	4	1	0	–		–		22	4
Riga	2022	Latvian Higher League	0	0	0	0	–		–		0	0
Riga	Total		21	4	1	0	–		–		22	4
PAS Giannina	2022–23	Super League Greece	1	0	0	0	–		–		0	0
PAS Giannina	2023–24	Super League Greece	21	1	0	0	–		–		21	1
PAS Giannina	2024–25	Super League Greece 2	16	0	3	1	–		–		19	1
Career total			203	26	13	2	–		0	0	216	28

== Honours ==
PAS Giannina

- Super League Greece 2: 2019–20

Individual

- Super League Greece 2 runner-up top scorer: 2019–20 (10 goals)
