= Gerasimos Bakadimas =

Greek footballer (born 2000)

Makis Bakadimas
Personal information
- Full name: Gerasimos Bakadimas
- Date of birth: 6 June 2000 (age 26)
- Place of birth: Xiromero, Aetolia-Acarnania, Greece
- Height: 1.81 m (5 ft 11 in)
- Position: Centre-back

Youth career
- Panetolikos

Senior career*
Years	Team	Apps	(Gls)
2019–2020	Panetolikos	0	(0)
2020	→ Messolonghi (loan)		
2020	Marko		
2021	Anagennisi Karditsa	19	(1)
2021–2022	Panetolikos	7	(0)
2022–2025	PAS Giannina	42	(0)
2025	Olympiakos Nicosia	11	(0)
- * Club domestic league appearances and goals as of 22 November 2025

Gerasimos 'Makis' Bakadimas (Greek: Γεράσιμος 'Μάκης' Μπακαδήμας; born 6 June 2000) is a Greek professional footballer who played as a centre-back.
