= Boris Klaiman =

Ukrainian-born Israeli footballer

Boris Klaiman בוריס קליימן
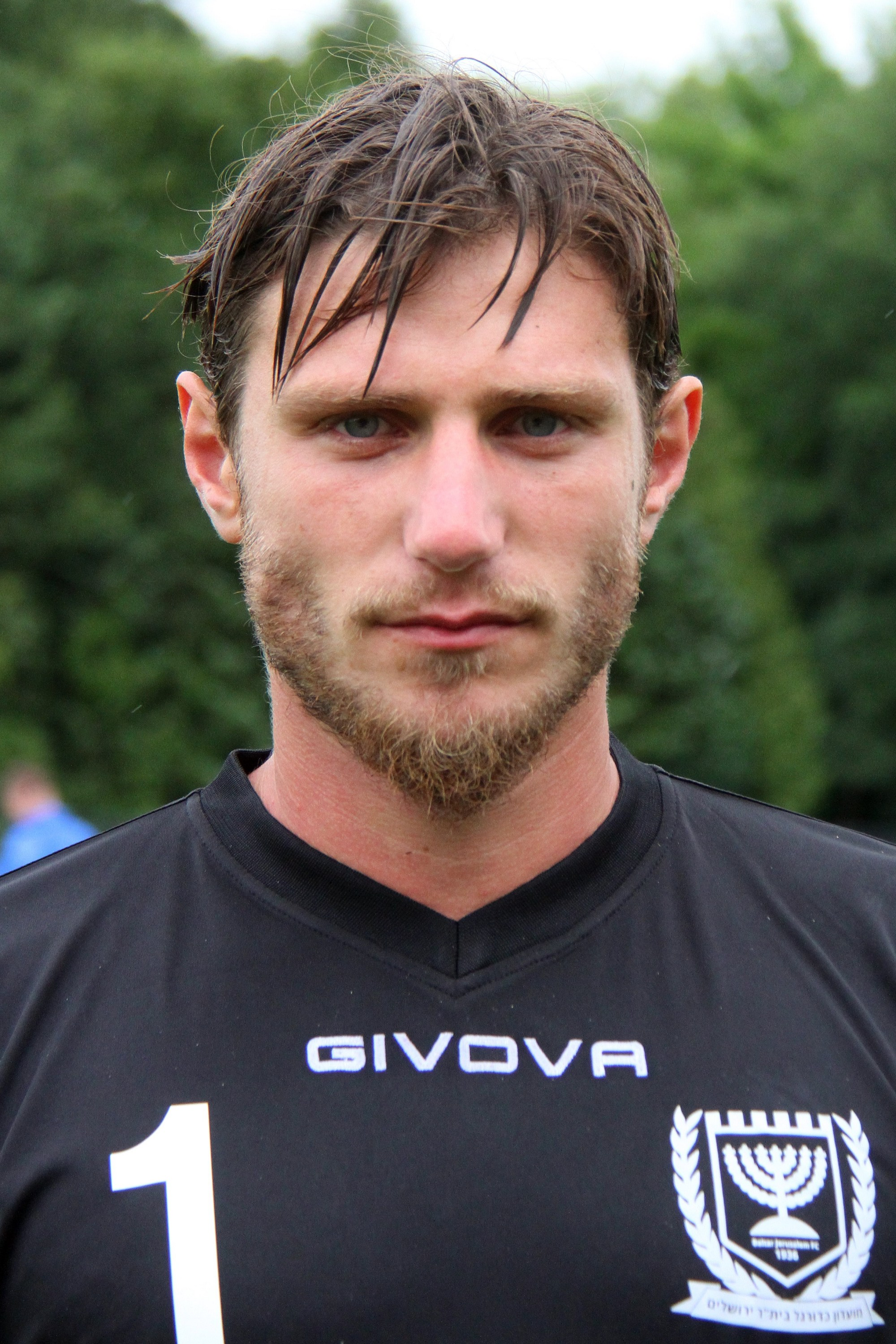
- Klaiman with Beitar Jerusalem in 2016

Personal information
- Date of birth: 26 October 1990 (age 36)
- Place of birth: Vinnytsia, UkSSR, USSR (now Ukraine)
- Height: 1.86 m (6 ft 1 in)
- Position: Goalkeeper

Team information
- Current team: Titan Loggadon

Youth career
- Hapoel Tel Aviv
- Hapoel Kfar Saba

Senior career*
Years	Team	Apps	(Gls)
2008–2009	Hapoel Kfar Saba	13	(0)
2009–2014	Hapoel Tel Aviv	25	(0)
2009–2010	→ Maccabi Herzliya (loan)	4	(0)
2010–2011	→ Hapoel Kfar Saba (loan)	36	(0)
2014–2018	Beitar Jerusalem	137	(0)
2018–2020	Enosis Neon Paralimni	47	(0)
2020–2023	Volos	70	(0)
2023–2024	PAS Giannina	19	(0)
2024	→ Chania (loan)	10	(0)
2024	Agrotikos Kastritsas	5	(1)
2025-2026	A.O. Zoodochos	27	(5)
2026-	Titan Loggadon	1	(0)

International career
2008	Israel U18	1	(0)
2008	Israel U19	10	(0)
2009–2013	Israel U21	21	(0)
2016	Israel	1	(0)
- * Club domestic league appearances and goals as of 6 February 2024

Boris Klaiman (sometimes Kleyman, Hebrew: בוריס קליימן, Ukrainian: Борис Кляйман; born 26 October 1990) is an Israeli professional footballer who plays as a goalkeeper. Born in then Soviet Ukraine (now Ukraine), he is a former Israel international who appeared once for it in 2016.

== Club career ==
Klaiman was born in Vinnytsia, Soviet Ukraine, USSR, and when he was ten months old, immigrated to Israel with his family. He began his career in the Hapoel Tel Aviv and Hapoel Kfar Saba youth teams, then joined Hapoel Tel Aviv senior team before the 2009–10 season. He played on loan at Maccabi Herzliya before returning to Hapoel Kfar Saba.

=== Hapoel Kfar Saba ===
As a child began to play football in the youth system of Hapoel Tel Aviv, and then moved to the youth department of Hapoel Kfar Saba. On 15 August 2008, he made his debut for the first team, in a draw 0–0 against Hapoel Ra'anana at 2008–09. At this season Klaiman played 13 games at the first team.

=== Hapoel Tel Aviv ===
In summer 2009, Klamian moved back to Hapoel Tel Aviv, and was loaned to Maccabi Herzliya for half season. In January 2010, he returned to Hapoel Tel Aviv, and was a second goalkeeper during Vincent Enyeama played 2010 Africa Cup of Nations. Klaiman didn't share Hapoel Tel Aviv games this season, but was part of a squad team that won the double at the end of the season. In summer 2010 on loaned back to Hapoel Kfar Saba, to get playing time.

In summer 2011, Klaiman returned to Hapoel Tel Aviv, as a second goalkeeper for Apoula Edel. On 31 July 2011 he made his debut for Hapoel Tel Aviv, as he came on as a substitute after Edel got red card at Tel Aviv derby. On 29 October 2011 he made his debut in the Israeli Premier League, coming on as a substitute 6–0 victory against Hapoel Rishon LeZion. At this season he played in 8 games, and at the end of the season won with the team of Israel State Cup. At 2012–13 season played 10 games.

In summer 2013 Danny Amos signed with Hapoel Tel Aviv, and Klaiman again began the season as second goalkeeper. After the 3rd round Amos was injured, and Klaiman impressed when he played and even called up to the Israel national football team's squad. At this season he played 11 games.

=== Beitar Jerusalem ===
On 7 August 2014, Klaiman signed a three-year with Beitar Jerusalem. On 13 August 2014, Klaiman made his debut at the club, at the 1–2 loss to Hapoel Petah Tikva at the Toto Cup. On 27 October 2014 Klaiman saved penalty the 82nd minute at the 2–0 victory against his former team Hapoel Tel Aviv after a bad kick of Yisrael Zaguri. On 22 May 2018 Klaiman left Beitar Jerusalem.

=== Enosis Neon Paralimni ===
On 23 July 2018, Cypriot side Enosis Neon Paralimni FC announced the signing of Klaiman for a two years contract with an undisclosed fee.

=== Volos ===
On 1 August 2020, Klaiman signed for two years with Super League Greece club Volos F.C.

In the morning of 11 April 2023, Klaiman was arrested outside a bar in the Kolonaki region of Athens, for alleged sexual assault of an underage Belgian female; his contract with the club was terminated following the incident.

=== PAS Giannina ===
On 1 July 2023, Klaiman signed a contract with Super League Greece club PAS Giannina.

== International career ==
At youth international level, Klaiman was capped in Israel at levels from under-18 to under-21. On 11 August 2009 he made his debut for Israel U21 against Serbia. In June 2013 he took part at 2013 UEFA European Under-21 Championship and used as a first goalkeeper. Totally Klamian has 21 appearances for the Israeli youth team.

On 4 October 2013, he was called up for the senior Israeli squad, ahead of the matches against Portugal and Northern Ireland. On 23 March 2016, he made his senior international debut – as well as Kleiman's sole appearance with the squad – in a friendly match against Croatia, which ended in a 2–0 away loss.

== Honours ==
Hapoel Tel Aviv

- Israeli Premier League: 2009–10
- Israel State Cup: 2009–10, 2010–11
