= Iason Kyrkos =

Greek footballer

Personal information
- Date of birth: 21 March 2003 (age 23)
- Place of birth: Ioannina, Greece
- Height: 1.69 m (5 ft 7 in)
- Position: Attacking midfielder

Team information
- Current team: Volos
- Number: 19

Youth career
- 2009–2017: Atromitos Ioannina
- 2017–2021: PAS Giannina

Senior career*
Years	Team	Apps	(Gls)
2021–2025	PAS Giannina	26	(1)
2025–	Volos	10	(2)
- * Club domestic league appearances and goals as of 17 May 2026

Iason Kyrkos (Greek: Ιάσων Κύρκος; born 21 March 2003) is a Greek professional footballer who plays as an attacking midfielder for Super League club Volos.
