= Federico Gino =

Uruguayan footballer (born 1993)

Personal information
- Full name: Federico Gino Acevedo Fagúndez
- Date of birth: 26 February 1993 (age 33)
- Place of birth: Uruguaiana (RS), Brasil
- Height: 1.75 m (5 ft 9 in)
- Position: Midfielder

Team information
- Current team: Aldosivi
- Number: 13

Youth career
- –2013: Defensor Sporting

Senior career*
Years	Team	Apps	(Gls)
2013–2016	Defensor Sporting	45	(1)
2015–2016	→ Carpi (loan)	0	(0)
2016–2017	Cruzeiro	4	(0)
2017	→ Santa Cruz (loan)	4	(0)
2017–2018	All Boys	14	(2)
2018–2020	Aldosivi	52	(6)
2021	Atlético San Luis	9	(0)
2021–2022	Aldosivi	15	(1)
2022–2023	Platense	14	(0)
2023–2025	PAS Giannina	53	(2)
2025	A.E. Kifisia	8	(0)
2025–	Aldosivi	27	(3)

International career
2013	Uruguay U20	7	(1)
- * Club domestic league appearances and goals as of 17:55, 6 November 2026 (UTC)

Federico Gino Acevedo Fagúndez (born 26 February 1993) is a Uruguayan professional footballer who plays as a midfielder for Argentine Primera División club Aldosivi.

== Career ==
After graduating from Defensor Sporting's youth system, Gino made his professional debut on 25 August 2013, in a 1–1 home draw against Peñarol.

=== PAS Giannina ===
In December 2022, he signed for PAS Giannina in Super League Greece.
