= Daan Rienstra =

Dutch footballer (born 1992)

Personal information
- Date of birth: 6 October 1992 (age 34)
- Place of birth: Alkmaar, Netherlands
- Height: 1.74 m (5 ft 8 1/2 in)
- Position: Midfielder

Team information
- Current team: ADO '20
- Number: 23

Youth career
- Ajax
- Feyenoord
- Meervogels '31
- ADO '20

Senior career*
Years	Team	Apps	(Gls)
2013–2015	Heracles Almelo	1	(0)
2015–2020	Waalwijk	141	(6)
2020–2022	Volos	36	(2)
2022–2024	PAS Giannina	48	(2)
2024–2025	Kalamata	4	(0)
2025–	ADO '20	11	(0)
- * Club domestic league appearances and goals as of 15 January 2026

Daan Rienstra (born 6 October 1992) is a Dutch professional footballer who plays as a midfielder for Derde Divisie club ADO '20.

Rienstra has played in both the Netherlands and Greece, and has made over 290 appearances in his career.

== Career ==
Rienstra played for Ajax and Feyenoord during his youth, but clarified that he hadn't played for AZ. AFter leaving Feyenoord, he joined amateur football with Meervogels '31 and ADO '20, before training with Heracles Almelo, which his brother Ben Rienstra had played for. Whilst at Heracles Almelo, he made his debut against PSV Eindhoven, his only appearance for the club.

In 2015, Rienstra was announced at RKC Waalwijk, being signed by Peter van den Berg. Rienstra joined the club in order to play every week.

On 8 April 2019, Rienstra signed a two-year contract extension with RKC Waalwijk.

On 31 July 2020, Rienstra was announced at Volos on a two-year contract. After spending nine months in Volos with his girlfriend, the only negative he could think of during his time was poor WIFI connection.

On 12 July 2022, Rienstra moved to PAS Giannina on a permanent transfer, signing a two-year contract with the club.

On 22 July 2024, Rienstra was announced at Kalamata on a two-year contract. On 7 February 2025, the club announced it had terminated Rienstra's contract.

On 18 February 2025, Rienstra was announced at ADO '20 on a permanent transfer.

== Personal life ==
His brother is professional football player Ben Rienstra.

In May 2025, Rienstra revealed he still supports RKC Waalwijk, and mentioned he "really enjoyed" working with then manager Fred Grim.

== Career statistics ==
As of 9 September 2022

Club	Season	League			Cup		Continental		Other		Total	
Club	Season	Division	Apps	Goals	Apps	Goals	Apps	Goals	Apps	Goals	Apps	Goals
Heracles Almelo	2014–15	Eredivisie	1	0	0	0	—		—		1	0
Waalwijk	2016–17	Eerste Divisie	32	0	1	0	—		—		33	0
Waalwijk	2016–17	Eerste Divisie	39	3	2	0	—		—		41	3
Waalwijk	2017–18	Eerste Divisie	21	1	2	0	—		—		23	1
Waalwijk	2018–19	Eerste Divisie	31	2	1	0	—		—		32	2
Waalwijk	2019–20	Eredivisie	21	0	0	0	—		—		21	0
Waalwijk	Total		145	6	6	0	—		—		151	6
Volos	2020–21	Super League Greece	31	2	4	0	—		—		35	2
Volos	2021–22	Super League Greece	5	0	—		—		—		5	0
Volos	Total		36	2	4	0	—		—		40	2
PAS Giannina	2022–23	Superleague Greece	21	1	1	0	—		—		22	1
PAS Giannina	2023–24	Superleague Greece	27	1	0	0	—		—		27	1
Career total			229	10	11	0	0	0	0	0	240	10
