= 2022–23 PAS Giannina F.C. season =

PAS Giannina
2022–23 season
- Chairman: Giorgos Christovasilis (until 8 May 2023); Panagiotis & Giannis Christovasilis
- Manager: Athanasios Staikos
- Stadium: Zosimades Stadium
- Super League: 9th
- Greek Cup: Fifth round eliminated by AEK Athens
- Top goalscorer: League: Rodrigo Erramuspe (9 goals); All: Rodrigo Erramuspe (9 goals)
- Highest home attendance: 4,108; Olympiacos
- Lowest home attendance: 0; AEK Athens, Panathinaikos
- Average home league attendance: 2,039
Home colours	Away colours	Third colours

The 2022–23 season is PAS Giannina F.C.'s 27th competitive season in the top flight of Greek football, 12th season in the Super League Greece, and 57th year in existence as a football club. They also compete in the Greek Cup.

== Players ==
updated 27 February 2023

No.	Name	Nationality	Position(s)	Place of birth	Date of birth	Signed from	Notes
Goalkeepers
16	Panagiotis Tsintotas	(Greece)	GK	Katerini, Greece	4 July 1993	(Greece) AEK Athens	
64	Vasilis Soulis	(Greece)	GK	Patras, Greece	7 December 1994	(Greece) Panachaiki	
74	Thomas Vrakas	(Greece)	GK	Ioannina, Greece	22 July 2004	(Greece) PAS Giannina U19	
99	Vasilis Athanasiou	(Greece)	GK	Aigio, Greece	24 July 1999	(Italy) Mantova	
Defenders
2	Carles Soria	(Spain)	RB	Calaf, Spain	8 October 1996	(Portugal) Estoril	
3	Stavros Pilios	(Greece)	LB	Greece	10 December 2000	(Greece) Iraklis	
4	Epaminondas Pantelakis (Vice Captain)	(Greece)	CB	Chania, Crete, Greece	10 February 1995	(Greece) Panathinaikos	
15	Rodrigo Erramuspe (Third Captain)	(Argentina)	CB	Mar del Plata, Argentina	3 May 1990	(Argentina) Belgrano	
22	Angelos Tsavos	(Greece)	RB	Greece	11 April 2002	(Greece) Episkopi	
24	Andrei Radu	(Romania)	LB	Bucharest, Romania	21 June 1996	(Romania) Dinamo București	
25	Gerónimo Bortagaray	(Uruguay)	CB	Salto, Uruguay	5 August 2000	(Uruguay) Danubio FC	
31	Giannis Kiakos	(Greece)	LB	Bamberg, Germany	14 February 1998	(Greece) Ionikos	
45	Gerasimos Bakadimas	(Greece)	CB	Xiromero, Greece	6 June 2000	(Greece) Panetolikos	
Midfielders
5	Zisis Karachalios	(Greece)	DM / CM	Karditsa, Greece	10 January 1996	(Greece) Levadiakos	
6	Iker Bilbao	(Spain)	CM	Larrabetzu, Spain	20 March 1996	(Spain) Amorebieta	
7	Ahmad Mendes Moreira	(Guinea) (Netherlands)	W / FW	Schiedam, Netherlands	27 June 1995	(Netherlands) Excelsior	
8	Alexandros Lolis	(Greece)	MF	Ladochori Thesprotias, Greece	5 September 2002	(Greece) PAS Giannina U17	
10	Sotiris Ninis	(Greece)	AM	Himarë, Albania	3 April 1990	(Greece) Volos	
18	Manssour Fofana	(Ivory Coast)	W	Abobo, Ivory Coast	10 July 2002	(Greece) Veria	
20	Nikolaos Lolis	(Greece)	DM / CM	Ladochori Thesprotias, Greece	20 January 2005	(Greece) PAS Giannina U17	
21	Panagiotis Tzimas	(Greece)	AM	Preveza, Greece	12 March 2001	(Greece) PAOK	Loan
23	Daan Rienstra	(Netherlands)	DM / CM	Alkmaar, Netherlands	6 October 1992	(Greece) Volos	
28	Federico Gino	(Uruguay)	DM / CM	Melo, Uruguay	26 February 1993	(Argentina) Platense	
32	Angelos Tsiris	(Greece)	DM / CM	Ioannina, Greece	18 August 2004	(Greece) PAS Giannina U19	
70	Iason Kyrkos	(Greece)	AM / FW	Ioannina, Greece	21 March 2003	(Greece) PAS Giannina U19	
72	Labros Moustakas	(Greece)	AM		18 September 2003	(Greece) Apollon Smyrnis	
80	Angelos Liasos	(Greece)	CM	Florina, Greece	26 May 2000	(Greece) PAS Giannina U20	
Forwards
9	Pedro Conde (Captain)	(Spain)	FW	Villafranca, Spain	26 July 1988	(United Arab Emirates) Al Dhafra	
11	Kevin Rosero	(Colombia)	FW	Colombia	3 December 1998	(Greece) Volos	
14	Georgios Pamlidis	(Greece)	FW	Katerini, Greece	13 November 1993	(Greece) Apollon Smyrnis	
17	Jean-Baptiste Léo	(France)	FW	Lyon, France	3 May 1996	(Latvia) Riga	
88	Apostolos Stamatelopoulos	(Australia) (Greece)	FW	North Adelaide, Australia	9 April 1999	(Greece) Rodos	
91	Claudiu Bălan	(Romania)	FW	Craiova, Romania	22 June 1994	(Romania) FC U Craiova	
Left during Winter Transfer Window
40	Petros Bagalianis	(Greece)	CB	Kallikrateia, Greece	6 February 2001	(Greece) Olympiacos	Loan
1	Jérôme Prior	(France)	GK	Toulon, France	8 August 1995	(Spain) Cartagena	
12	Louis Poznański	(Germany) (Poland)	LB	Bremen, Germany	24 May 2001	(Germany) Werder Bremen II	

=== International players ===
- (Guinea) Ahmad Mendes Moreira (men's)
- (Greece) Sotiris Ninis (men's, U21/19)
- (Greece) Alexandros Lolis (U21)
- (Greece) Zisis Karachalios (U21/19)
- (Greece) Angelos Liasos (U21)
- (Greece) Petros Bagalianis (U21)
- (Greece) Angelos Tsavos (U21)
- (Romania) Andrei Radu (U21/18/17)
- (Australia) Apostolos Stamatelopoulos (U20)
- (Uruguay) Federico Gino (U20)
- (Greece) Vasilis Athanasiou (U19)
- (Greece) Epaminondas Pantelakis (U19)
- (Greece) Panagiotis Tzimas (U19/18/17)
- (Greece) Panagiotis Tsintotas (U19)
- (Germany) Louis Poznański (U18)

=== Foreign players ===
EU Nationals
- (Spain) (Europe) Pedro Conde
- (Spain) (Europe) Iker Bilbao
- (France) (Europe) Jérôme Prior
- (Spain) (Europe) Carles Soria
- (Netherlands) (Europe) Daan Rienstra
- (France) (Europe) Jean-Baptiste Léo
- (Romania) (Europe) Claudiu Bălan
- (Romania) (Europe) Andrei Radu

EU Nationals (Dual Citizenship)
- (Guinea) (Netherlands) (Europe) Ahmad Mendes Moreira
- (Germany) (Poland) (Europe) Louis Poznański
- (Greece) (Australia) (Europe) Apostolos Stamatelopoulos

Non-EU Nationals
- (Argentina) Rodrigo Erramuspe
- (Colombia) Kevin Rosero
- (Ivory Coast) Manssour Fofana
- (Uruguay) Federico Gino
- (Uruguay) Gerónimo Bortagaray

== Personnel ==
=== Management ===
Position	Staff
Majority Owner	Giorgos Christovasilis (Until 8 May 2023) Panagiotis & Giannis Christovasilis
President and CEO	Giorgos Christovasilis (until 14 May 2023) Panagiotis Christovasilis (From 16 May 2023)
Head of Ticket Department	Andreas Potsis
Press & Media Office	Vasilis Thodoris
Marketing Office	Kostas Pediaditakis

=== Coaching staff ===
Position	Name
Head Coach	Athanasios Staikos
Assistant Coach	Charalabos Pentarvanis Vasilis Argiriou
Fitness Coach	Ioannis Dourountos
Goalkeepers Coach	Slobodan Šuica (Until 18 September 2022) Giannis Plavoukos (From 24 September 2022)
Analyst	Vasilis Argiriou

=== Medical staff ===
Position	Name
Head doctor	Stavros Restanis
Doctor	Giannis Baltogiannis
Physio	Filippos Skordos

=== Academy ===
Position	Name
Director of Youth Development	Giorgos Ioannou
General Manager	Vasilis Lolis
Head Coach U19	Christos Agelis
Head Coach U17	Giannis Lolis
Fitness Coach	Dimitris Charisis
Goalkeepers coach	Nikos Gortzis

== Transfers ==
=== Summer ===
==== In ====
No	Pos	Player	Transferred from	Fee	Date	Source
3	LB	Stavros Pilios	Iraklis Thessaloniki	Loan return	5 June 2022	
11	FW	Kevin Rosero	Volos	Free	9 June 2022	
31	LB	Giannis Kiakos	Ionikos	Free	10 June 2022	
88	FW	Apostolos Stamatelopoulos	Rodos	Free	13 June 2022	
22	RB	Angelos Tsavos	Episkopi	Free	14 June 2022	
6	CM	Iker Bilbao	Amorebieta	Free	28 June 2022	
1	GK	Jérôme Prior	Cartagena	Free	4 July 2022	
2	RB	Carles Soria	Estoril	Free	12 July 2022	
23	DM / CM	Daan Rienstra	Volos	Free	12 July 2022	
40	CB	Petros Bagalianis	Olympiacos	Loan	15 July 2022	
21	AM	Panagiotis Tzimas	PAOK	Loan	20 July 2022	
14	FW	Georgios Pamlidis	Apollon Smyrnis	Free	22 July 2022	
17	FW	Jean-Baptiste Léo	Riga	Free	26 July 2022	
20	CM	Nikolaos Lolis	PAS Giannina U17	Promoted	9 September 2022	
32	DM / CM	Angelos Tsiris	PAS Giannina U19	Promoted	9 September 2022	
18	W	Manssour Fofana	Veria	Free	12 August 2022	
91	FW	Claudiu Bălan	FC U Craiova	Free	13 September 2022	
45	CB	Gerasimos Bakadimas	Panetolikos	Free	14 September 2022	
72	AM	Labros Moustakas	Apollon Smyrnis	Free	30 September 2022	
74	GK	Thomas Vrakas	PAS Giannina U19	Promoted	22 October 2022	

==== Out ====
No	Pos	Player	Transferred to	Fee	Date	Source
2	RB	Manolis Saliakas	FC St. Pauli	End of contract	18 May 2022	
43	LB	Marvin Peersman	Aris	End of contract	1 June 2022	
33	CB	Dimitris Karagiannis		Released	4 June 2022	
1	GK	Yuri Lodygin	Panathinaikos	End of contract	4 June 2022	
24	RB	Antonis Ikonomopoulos	Volos	End of contract	7 June 2022	
22	CM	Stefanos Siontis	Panserraikos	End of contract	15 June 2022	
8	MF	Fabricio Brener	Belgrano	End of loan	15 June 2022	
27	DM	Caleb Stanko	Asteras Tripolis	End of contract	23 June 2022	
29	LB / RB / RM	Michael Gardawski	Asteras Tripolis	End of contract	23 June 2022	
17	FW / W	Jan-Marc Schneider		End of contract	23 June 2022	
6	CB	Giannis Kargas	PAOK	300,000 euros	25 June 2022	
10	MF	Juan Dominguez	Asteras Tripolis	End of contract	30 June 2022	
11	FW / W	Juan José Perea	VfB Stuttgart	2,500,00 euros	8 July 2022	
28	FW	Leonid Mina	SV Werder Bremen II	Loan	18 August 2022	
77	LB	Giannis Rizos	Thesprotos	Loan	16 September 2022	

=== Winter ===
==== In ====
No	Pos	Player	Transferred from	Fee	Date	Source
10	AM	Sotiris Ninis	Free	Free	18 November 2022	
16	GK	Panagiotis Tsintotas	AEK Athens	Free	26 November 2022	
28	DM / CM	Federico Gino	Platense	Free	7 December 2022	
25	CB	Gerónimo Bortagaray	Danubio FC	Free	25 January 2023	
24	LB	Andrei Radu	Dinamo București	Free	17 February 2023	

==== Out ====
No	Pos	Player	Transferred to	Fee	Date	Source
40	CB	Petros Bagalianis	Olympiacos	Loan termination	12 January 2023	
1	GK	Jérôme Prior	Pau	Free	1 February 2023	
12	LB	Louis Poznański	Lechia Gdańsk	Free	14 February 2023	

== Pre-season and friendlies ==
Win Draw Loss Upcoming fixture

19 July 2022 Friendly	PAS Giannina	1–1	Baník Ostrava	Białobrzegi
19:00	Stamatelopoulos 5'	Report	Frydrych 45+'	Stadium: Stadion Miejski im. Zygmunta Siedleckiego; Referee: unknown

23 July 2022 Friendly	PAS Giannina	1–2	Omonia	Białobrzegi
13:00	A. Lolis 15'	Report	Miletić 10'; Kakoullis 89'	Stadium: Stadion Miejski im. Zygmunta Siedleckiego; Referee: unknown

30 July 2022 Friendly	Panetolikos	0–1	PAS Giannina	Agrinio
19:00		Report	Conde 55'	Stadium: Panetolikos Stadium; Referee: Christos Vergetis

7 August 2022 Friendly tournament	Volos	2–0	PAS Giannina	Volos
21:00	Paolo Fernandes 32'; Fernández 66'	Report		Stadium: Panthessaliko Stadium

9 August 2022 Friendly tournament	Asteras Tripolis	2–2 (a.e.t.) (3–4 p)	PAS Giannina	Volos
18:45	Barrales 39' (pen.); Soni (yellow card) 58'; Regis 87'	Report	Erramuspe 13'; Erramuspe (yellow card) 41'; Bagalianis 50'	Stadium: Panthessaliko Stadium; Referee: Konstantinos Tsintzas
	Penalties
	Regis (penalty missed); Benito (penalty scored); Iglesias (penalty missed); Antzoulas (penalty scored); Rubén García (penalty scored)		(penalty missed) Erramuspe; (penalty scored) Rosero; (penalty scored) Pilios; (penalty scored) Iker Bilbao; (penalty scored) Bagalianis

12 August 2022 Friendly	PAS Giannina	2–2	Karmiotissa	Ioannina
	Liasos 7'; Moreira 31'	Report	Kaltsas 20'; Chadjivasilis 74'	Stadium: Zosimades Stadium; Referee: Kostas Tsetsilas

11 September 2022 Friendly	PAS Giannina	3–0	Thesprotos	Ioannina
	Stamatelopoulos 5' (pen.); Tzimas 15'; Pantelakis 23'	Report		Stadium: PEAKI; Referee: Dimitris Chatzipanagiotou

22 September 2022 Friendly	PAS Giannina	3–1	Veria	Ioannina
	Stamatelopoulos 13'; Rosero 83'; Tzimas 90'	Report	Fasidis 53'	Stadium: PEAKI; Referee: Alexandros Katsikogiannis

3 December 2022 Friendly	PAS Giannina	1–0	Panetolikos	Ioannina
17:00	Moreira 42'	Report		Stadium: Zosimades Stadium; Referee: Kostas Boubas

== Competitions ==
=== Super League 1 ===
==== League table ====
Pos	Team	Pld	W	D	L	GF	GA	GD	Pts	Qualification or relegation
9	OFI	26	6	8	12	23	34	−11	26	Qualification for the Play-out round
10	Asteras Tripolis	26	4	13	9	19	30	−11	25	Qualification for the Play-out round
11	PAS Giannina	26	4	11	11	24	41	−17	23	Qualification for the Play-out round
12	Ionikos	26	4	6	16	16	42	−26	18	Qualification for the Play-out round
13	Lamia	26	2	11	13	13	45	−32	17 (Note: Head to head points: Lamia 4, Levadiakos 1)	Qualification for the Play-out round

Source: Super League Greece
Rules for classification: 1) Points; 2) Head-to-head points; 3) Head-to-head goal difference; 4) Goal difference; 5) Goals scored; 6) Play-offs (neutral ground).
(Note: Criterion 6 is only used if needed to decide champion, teams for relegation or teams for UEFA competitions).

==== Results summary ====
Overall								Home						Away					
Pld	W	D	L	GF	GA	GD	Pts	W	D	L	GF	GA	GD	W	D	L	GF	GA	GD
26	4	11	11	24	41	−17	23	3	6	4	13	19	−6	1	5	7	11	22	−11

==== Fixtures ====
Win Draw Loss Upcoming fixture

21 August 2022 1	Olympiacos	2–0	PAS Giannina	Piraeus
22:00	Valbuena 57'; Ranđelović 74'	Report		Stadium: Karaiskakis Stadium; Attendance: 9.523; Referee: Evangelos Manouchos

27 August 2022 2	PAS Giannina	1–1	Lamia	Ioannina
20:00	Erramuspe 13'; Moreira (yellow card) 81'; Karachalios (yellow card) 82'	Report	Tsiloulis (yellow card) 43'; Núñez 58'; Núñez (yellow card) 61'; Bejarano (yellow card) 74'; Tsoukalos (yellow card) 90+8'	Stadium: Zosimades Stadium; Attendance: 1.391; Referee: Alexandros Tsakalidis

4 September 2022 3	AEK Athens	2–0	PAS Giannina	Rizoupoli
21:30	Pineda 39'; Szymański (yellow card) 41'; Tzavellas (yellow card) 80'; Amrabat 87'	Report	Pamlidis (yellow card) 28'	Stadium: Georgios Kamaras Stadium; Attendance: 13.072; Referee: Evangelos Manouchos

10 September 2022 4	PAS Giannina	2–1	Levadiakos	Ioannina
19:15	Rosero 2'; Erramuspe 73'; Soria (yellow card) 88'	Report	Mejía (yellow card) 17'; Moutinho 45+1'; Konstantinidis (yellow card) 65'; Tzimopoulos (yellow card) 83'	Stadium: Zosimades Stadium; Attendance: 1.212; Referee: Andreas Gamaris

17 September 2022 5	Panathinaikos	3–0	PAS Giannina	Athens
21:30	Aitor 44', 54', 70'	Report	Soulis (yellow card) 26'; Tzimas (yellow card) 43'; Liasos (yellow card) 90+2'	Stadium: Leoforos Alexandras Stadium; Attendance: 11.040; Referee: Aristomenis Kotsiaftis

3 October 2022 6	PAS Giannina	1–4	Panetolikos	Ioannina
18:00	Soria (yellow card) 27'; Erramuspe 34'; Bagalianis (yellow card) 89'; Karachalios (yellow card) 90'	Report	Morsay 7'; Larsson (yellow card) 19'; Karelis 25', 71', 87'; Karelis (yellow card) 42'; Shengelia (yellow card) 51'	Stadium: Zosimades Stadium; Attendance: 1.177; Referee: Dimitrios Maloutas

10 October 2022 7	Atromitos	2–1	PAS Giannina	Peristeri
18:00	Klonaridis (yellow card) 56'; De Bock (yellow card) 62'; Kjartansson 75', 86'; Kjartansson (yellow card) 87'; Erlingmark (yellow card) 90+2'	Report	Kiakos (yellow card) 28'; Mavrommatis 63' (o.g.)	Stadium: Peristeri Stadium; Attendance: 804; Referee: Angelos Angelakis

16 October 2022 8	PAS Giannina	2–2	OFI	Ioannina
18:00	Rosero 19'; Karachalios (yellow card) 43'; Bălan 76'	Report	Toral 56'; Dioussé 89'	Stadium: Zosimades Stadium; Attendance: 1.808; Referee: Angelos Evangelou

23 October 2022 9	Ionikos	2–2	PAS Giannina	Nikaia
16:00	Lovera 26'; Aosman 31'; Valerianos (yellow card) 84'	Report	Erramuspe (yellow card) 29'; Iker Bilbao (yellow card) 43'; Erramuspe 55' (pen.), 85' (pen.)	Stadium: Neapoli; Attendance: 1.329; Referee: Athanasios Tzilos

31 October 2022 10	PAS Giannina	2–1	Asteras Tripolis	Ioannina
18:00	Pantelakis (yellow card) 34'; Tzimas (yellow card) 38'; Bălan 63'; Fofana 76'; Bălan (yellow card) 84'	Report	Pepe Castaño (yellow card) 8'; Iglesias (yellow card) 39'; Regis 47'; Sito (yellow card) 60'; Stanko (yellow card) 70'; Domínguez (yellow card) 90+2'	Stadium: Zosimades Stadium; Attendance: 1.330; Referee: Fotios Polychronis

5 November 2022 11	PAOK	2–0	PAS Giannina	Thessaloniki
21:00	Ingason 8'; Schwab 10' (pen.); Koulierakis (yellow card) 49'; El Kaddouri (yellow card) 52'; Živković (yellow card) 57'; Sastre (yellow card) 68'	Report	Liasos (yellow card) 7'; Pantelakis (yellow card) 34'; Soria (yellow card) 63'; Moreira (yellow card) 83'	Stadium: Toumba; Attendance: 7.800; Referee: Konstantinos Perrakis

10 November 2022 12	Volos	2–1	PAS Giannina	Volos
19:00	Mezquida (yellow card) 27'; Shelis (yellow card) 36'; Ožegović 47', 55'	Report	Pilios (yellow card) 62'; Bălan 82'; Karachalios (yellow card) 84'	Stadium: Panthessaliko Stadium; Attendance: 2.219; Referee: Anastasios Papapetrou

13 November 2022 13	PAS Giannina	0–4	Aris	Ioannina
16:00	Erramuspe (yellow card) 20'	Report	Fabiano (yellow card) 9'; Fabiano 60' (pen.); M'Bakata (yellow card) 67'; Nkoulou 79'; Odubajo 81'; Etebo (yellow card) 90'; Luis Palma 90+3'	Stadium: Zosimades Stadium; Attendance: 1.955; Referee: Dimitrios Maloutas

21 December 2022 14	PAS Giannina	2–2	Olympiacos	Ioannina
20:00	Pilios (yellow card) 36'; Pamlidis 64'; Liasos 76'; Soulis (yellow card) 90+4'; Moreira (yellow card) 90+5'	Report	Fortounis 34', 45'; Ntoi (yellow card) 50'	Stadium: Zosimades Stadium; Attendance: 4.108; Referee: Stefanos Koubarakis

29 December 2022 15	Lamia	1–1	PAS Giannina	Lamia
18:30	Goranov (yellow card) 35'; Manousos (yellow card) 50'; Bejarano 66'; Tzandaris (yellow card) 74'; Vasilakakis (yellow card) 90+5'	Report	Moreira (yellow card) 25'; Erramuspe (yellow card) 41'; Kornezos 74' (o.g.)	Stadium: Lamia Municipal Stadium; Attendance: 1.383; Referee: Christos Vergetis

3 January 2023 16	PAS Giannina	2–1	AEK Athens	Ioannina
20:00	Rienstra 9'; Bălan 32'; Pamlidis (yellow card) 77'; Erramuspe (yellow card) 90+1'; Tsintotas (yellow card) 90+4'	Report	Araujo 51'; Amrabat (yellow card) 90+1'	Stadium: Zosimades Stadium; Attendance: 0 (closed doors); Referee: Vasileios Fotias

7 January 2023 17	Levadiakos	1–3	PAS Giannina	Livadeia
17:30	Vrakas (yellow card) 42'; Konstantinidis (yellow card) 53'; Panagiotou 88'	Report	Bălan 32'; Pilios (yellow card) 53'; Gino (yellow card) 57'; Erramuspe 65'; Pamlidis 69'; Pantelakis (yellow card) 78'	Stadium: Levadia Municipal Stadium; Attendance: 837; Referee: Evangelos Manouchos

15 January 2023 18	PAS Giannina	0–1	Panathinaikos	Ioannina
20:30	Rienstra (yellow card) 59'; Bălan (yellow card) 68'; Moreira (yellow card) 90+4'; Erramuspe (yellow card) 90+8'	Report	Rubén Pérez (yellow card) 57'; Šporar 90+5' (pen.)	Stadium: Zosimades Stadium; Attendance: 0 (closed doors); Referee: Petros Tsagarakis

20 January 2023 19	Panetolikos	1–1	PAS Giannina	Agrinio
20:30	Mladen (yellow card) 26'; Duarte 82'	Report	Gino (yellow card) 67'; Erramuspe (yellow card) 69'; Erramuspe 89'	Stadium: Panetolikos Stadium; Attendance: 1.992; Referee: Anastasios Papapetrou

28 January 2023 20	PAS Giannina	1–1	Atromitos	Ioannina
20:00	Bălan 32'; Karachalios (yellow card) 51'; Tzimas (yellow card) 90+4'	Report	Friðjónsson (yellow card) 43'; Erlingmark (yellow card) 55'; Tzovaras 71'; Tzovaras (yellow card) 77'	Stadium: Zosimades Stadium; Attendance: 1.678; Referee: Anastasios Sidiropoulos

4 February 2023 21	OFI	0–0	PAS Giannina	Heraklion, Crete
17:00	Bakić (yellow card) 60'; Pasalidis (yellow card) 69'; Tsilianidis (yellow card) 90+11'	Report	Pantelakis (yellow card) 45' (yellow-red card) 90+4'; Karachalios (yellow card) 72'	Stadium: Theodoros Vardinogiannis; Attendance: 4.124; Referee: Agelos Evangelou

11 February 2023 22	PAS Giannina	0–0	Ionikos	Ioannina
20:00	Gino (yellow card) 63'	Report	Romao (yellow card) 61' (yellow-red card) 66'; Rrumbullaku (yellow card) 90+4'	Stadium: Zosimades Stadium; Attendance: 1.550; Referee: Evangelos Manouchos

18 February 2023 23	Asteras Tripolis	1–1	PAS Giannina	Tripoli
15:00	Riera 2'; Pichu Atienza (yellow card) 28'; Georgios Kosteas (yellow card) 74'	Report	Gino (yellow card) 26'; Erramuspe 37' (pen.); Tzimas (yellow card) 90+2'	Stadium: Theodoros Kolokotronis; Attendance: 854; Referee: Stavros Tsimenteridis

25 February 2023 24	PAS Giannina	0–0	PAOK	Ioannina
19:00	Karachalios (yellow card) 32'; Lolis (yellow card) 54'; Pilios (yellow card) 84'	Report		Stadium: Zosimades Stadium; Attendance: 1.555; Referee: Agelos Evangelou

5 March 2023 25	PAS Giannina	0–1	Volos	Ioannina
17:00	Gino (yellow card) 23'	Report	Tachatos 83'; Chirinos (yellow card) 87'	Stadium: Zosimades Stadium; Attendance: 1.767; Referee: Michael Matsoukas

12 March 2023 26	Aris	3–1	PAS Giannina	Thessaloniki
19:00	Darida 26'; Mateo García 43'; Peersman (yellow card) 45'; Kamara 58'	Report	Liasos 7'; Soria (yellow card) 41'	Stadium: Kleanthis Vikelidis Stadium; Attendance: 5.769; Referee: Konstantinos Katoikos

=== Play out round ===
Pos	Team	Pld	W	D	L	GF	GA	GD	Pts
7	OFI	33	10	11	12	37	41	−4	41
8	Atromitos	33	9	11	13	34	36	−2	38
9	PAS Giannina	33	7	13	13	33	50	−17	34
10	Asteras Tripolis	33	5	16	12	23	36	−13	31
11	Panetolikos	33	7	9	17	32	53	−21	30

Source: Super League Greece, Soccerway
Rules for classification: 1) Points; 2) Head-to-head points (Regular season and play-off); 3) Head-to-head goal difference (Regular season and play-off); 4) Regular season position.

==== Results summary ====
Overall								Home						Away					
Pld	W	D	L	GF	GA	GD	Pts	W	D	L	GF	GA	GD	W	D	L	GF	GA	GD
33	7	13	13	33	50	−17	34	5	6	5	17	22	−5	2	7	8	16	28	−12

==== Fixtures ====
Win Draw Loss Upcoming fixture

18 March 2023 1	Lamia	2–0	PAS Giannina	Lamia
21:00	Vergos 12', 45+1'; De Vincenti (yellow card) 40' (yellow-red card) 52'; Manousos (yellow card) 88' (yellow-red card) 90+6'	Report	Pilios (yellow card) 19'; Moreira (yellow card) 63'; Tsintotas (yellow card) 90+3'	Stadium: Lamia Municipal Stadium; Attendance: 1.087; Referee: Petros Tsagarakis

1 April 2023 2	PAS Giannina	0–1	OFI	Ioannina
19:30	Rienstra (yellow card) 41'; Moreira (yellow card) 70'	Report	Larsson 20'; Larsson (yellow card) 37'; Þórarinsson (yellow card) 75'	Stadium: Zosimades Stadium; Attendance: 3.047; Referee: Alexandros Tsakalidis

8 April 2023 3	Atromitos	1–1	PAS Giannina	Peristeri, Athens
17:00	Camara 7'; Mavrommatis (yellow card) 27'; Eder González (yellow card) 55'	Report	Liasos (yellow card) 6'; Pamlidis 27'; Tsavos (yellow card) 48'; Gino (yellow card) 54'; Bălan (yellow card) 90+1'	Stadium: Peristeri Stadium; Attendance: 1.278; Referee: Efstathios Gortsilas

22 April 2023 4	PAS Giannina	3–2	Panetolikos	Ioannina
19:15	Pamlidis 14', 62'; Iker Bilbao (yellow card) 53'; Soria (yellow card) 54'; Erramuspe 78' (pen.); Pamlidis (yellow card) 90+1'	Report	Juanpi 24'; Karelis 56'; Mladen (yellow card) 60'; Anastasopoulos (yellow card) 69'; Apostolakis (yellow card) 77'	Stadium: Zosimades Stadium; Attendance: 2.794; Referee: Konstantinos Katoikos

29 April 2023 5	Ionikos	0–1	PAS Giannina	Nikaia
19:15	Romao (yellow card) 78'; Valerianos (yellow card) 90'; Mygas (yellow card) 90+6'	Report	Gino (yellow card) 24'; Moreira 64'; Liasos (yellow card) 66'; Bălan (yellow card) 90+2'; Pamlidis (yellow card) 90+6'; Rosero (yellow card) 90+8'; Athanasiou (yellow card) 90+10'	Stadium: Neapoli; Attendance: 2.191; Referee: Vasileios Fotias

6 May 2023 6	PAS Giannina	1–0	Asteras Tripolis	Ioannina
20:00	Soria (yellow card) 61'; Rosero 84'; Erramuspe (yellow card) 86'	Report	Rubén García (yellow card) 64'; Léo Tilica (yellow card) 75'	Stadium: Zosimades Stadium; Attendance: 3.173; Referee: Andreas Gamaris

13 May 2023 7	Levadiakos	3–3	PAS Giannina	Livadeia
20:00	Gianniotas 28'; Tsapras 45+2'; Vrakas 77'	Report	Conde 34'; Rosero 38'; Soria (yellow card) 42'; Erramuspe (yellow card) 77'; Pamlidis 80'	Stadium: Levadia Municipal Stadium; Attendance: 928; Referee: Michael Matsoukas

=== Greek Cup ===
==== Matches ====
20 October 2022 Fifth round	AEK Athens	2–0	PAS Giannina	Nea Filadelfeia
19:00	Kosidis 5'; Mantalos 67' (pen.); Galanopoulos (yellow card) 74'; Araujo (yellow card) 82'	Report	A. Lolis (yellow card) 60'	Stadium: Agia Sophia Stadium; Referee: Aristotelis Diamantopoulos

== Statistics ==
=== Appearances ===
No.	Pos.	Nat.	Name	Greek Super League	Greek Cup	Total
No.	Pos.	Nat.	Name	Apps	Apps	Apps
1	GK	(France)	Jérôme Prior	3	1	4
2	RB	(Spain)	Carles Soria	31	1	32
3	LB	(Greece)	Stavros Pilios	23	1	24
4	CB	(Greece)	Epaminondas Pantelakis	25	1	26
5	DM / CM	(Greece)	Zisis Karachalios	23	1	24
6	CM	(Spain)	Iker Bilbao	16	0	16
7	W / FW	(Guinea) (Netherlands)	Ahmad Mendes Moreira	31	1	32
8	MF	(Greece)	Alexandros Lolis	11	1	12
9	FW	(Spain)	Pedro Conde	5	0	5
10	AM	(Greece)	Sotiris Ninis	9	0	9
11	FW	(Colombia)	Kevin Rosero	22	1	23
12	LB	(Germany) (Poland)	Louis Poznański	3	0	3
14	FW	(Greece)	Georgios Pamlidis	28	1	29
15	CB	(Argentina)	Rodrigo Erramuspe	31	0	31
16	GK	(Greece)	Panagiotis Tsintotas	15	0	15
17	FW	(France)	Jean-Baptiste Léo	4	0	4
18	W	(Ivory Coast)	Manssour Fofana	5	1	6
20	MF	(Greece)	Nikolaos Lolis	1	0	1
21	AM	(Greece)	Panagiotis Tzimas	28	0	28
22	RB	(Greece)	Angelos Tsavos	3	0	3
23	DM / CM	(Netherlands)	Daan Rienstra	21	1	22
24	LB	(Romania)	Andrei Radu	2	0	2
25	CB	(Uruguay)	Gerónimo Bortagaray	6	0	6
28	DM / CM	(Uruguay)	Federico Gino	16	0	16
31	LB	(Greece)	Giannis Kiakos	8	1	9
32	DM / CM	(Greece)	Angelos Tsiris	2	0	2
40	CB	(Greece)	Petros Bagalianis	8	1	9
45	CB	(Greece)	Gerasimos Bakadimas	8	0	8
64	GK	(Greece)	Vasilios Soulis	9	0	9
70	AM / FW	(Greece)	Iason Kyrkos	2	0	2
72	AM	(Greece)	Labros Moustakas	0	0	0
74	GK	(Greece)	Thomas Vrakas	0	0	0
80	CM	(Greece)	Angelos Liasos	23	1	24
88	FW	(Australia) (Greece)	Apostolos Stamatelopoulos	17	0	17
91	FW	(Romania)	Claudiu Bălan	27	1	28
99	GK	(Greece)	Vasilis Athanasiou	9	1	10

Super League Greece

=== Goalscorers ===
No.	Pos.	Nat.	Name	Greek Super League	Greek Cup	Total
No.	Pos.	Nat.	Name	Goals	Goals	Goals
15	CB	(Argentina)	Rodrigo Erramuspe	9	0	9
14	FW	(Greece)	Georgios Pamlidis	6	0	6
91	FW	(Romania)	Claudiu Bălan	6	0	6
11	FW	(Colombia)	Kevin Rosero	4	0	4
80	CM	(Greece)	Angelos Liasos	2	0	2
7	W / FW	(Guinea) (Netherlands)	Ahmad Mendes Moreira	1	0	1
9	FW	(Spain)	Pedro Conde	1	0	1
18	W	(Ivory Coast)	Manssour Fofana	1	0	1
23	DM / CM	(Netherlands)	Daan Rienstra	1	0	1
			Own goals	2	0	2

Super League Greece

=== Clean sheets ===
No.	Pos.	Nat.	Name	Greek Super League	Greek Cup	Total
No.	Pos.	Nat.	Name	CS	CS	CS
1	GK	(France)	Jérôme Prior	0 (3)	0 (1)	0 (4)
16	GK	(Greece)	Panagiotis Tsintotas	2 (15)	0 (0)	2 (15)
64	GK	(Greece)	Vasilios Soulis	1 (9)	0 (0)	1 (9)
74	GK	(Greece)	Thomas Vrakas	0 (0)	0 (0)	0 (0)
99	GK	(Greece)	Vasilis Athanasiou	1 (9)	0 (1)	1 (10)

=== Disciplinary record ===
S	P	N	Name	Super League			Play out			Greek Cup			Total		
S	P	N	Name	Yellow card	Yellow-red card	Red card	Yellow card	Yellow-red card	Red card	Yellow card	Yellow-red card	Red card	Yellow card	Yellow-red card	Red card
2	RB	(Spain)	Carles Soria	4	0	0	3	0	0	0	0	0	7	0	0
3	LB	(Greece)	Stavros Pilios	4	0	0	1	0	0	0	0	0	5	0	0
4	CB	(Greece)	Epaminondas Pantelakis	3	1	0	0	0	0	0	0	0	3	1	0
5	DM / CM	(Greece)	Zisis Karachalios	7	0	0	0	0	0	0	0	0	7	0	0
6	CM	(Spain)	Iker Bilbao	1	0	0	1	0	0	0	0	0	2	0	0
7	W / FW	(Guinea) (Netherlands)	Ahmad Mendes Moreira	5	0	0	2	0	0	0	0	0	7	0	0
8	MF	(Greece)	Alexandros Lolis	1	0	0	0	0	0	1	0	0	2	0	0
11	FW	(Colombia)	Kevin Rosero	0	0	0	1	0	0	0	0	0	1	0	0
14	FW	(Greece)	Georgios Pamlidis	2	0	0	2	0	0	0	0	0	4	0	0
15	CB	(Argentina)	Rodrigo Erramuspe	6	0	0	2	0	0	0	0	0	8	0	0
16	GK	(Greece)	Panagiotis Tsintotas	1	0	0	1	0	0	0	0	0	2	0	0
21	AM	(Greece)	Panagiotis Tzimas	4	0	0	0	0	0	0	0	0	4	0	0
22	RB	(Greece)	Angelos Tsavos	0	0	0	1	0	0	0	0	0	1	0	0
23	DM / CM	(Netherlands)	Daan Rienstra	1	0	0	1	0	0	0	0	0	2	0	0
28	DM / CM	(Uruguay)	Federico Gino	5	0	0	2	0	0	0	0	0	7	0	0
31	LB	(Greece)	Giannis Kiakos	1	0	0	0	0	0	0	0	0	1	0	0
40	CB	(Greece)	Petros Bagalianis	1	0	0	0	0	0	0	0	0	1	0	0
64	GK	(Greece)	Vasilios Soulis	2	0	0	0	0	0	0	0	0	2	0	0
80	CM	(Greece)	Angelos Liasos	2	0	0	2	0	0	0	0	0	4	0	0
91	FW	(Romania)	Claudiu Bălan	2	0	0	2	0	0	0	0	0	4	0	0
99	GK	(Greece)	Vasilis Athanasiou	0	0	0	1	0	0	0	0	0	1	0	0

== Awards ==
=== Player of the club ===
	Name	
1	Rodrigo Erramuspe	22,35%
2	Zisis Karachalios	18,55%
3	Panagiotis Tsintotas	14,44%
4	Georgios Pamlidis	12,83%
5	Stavros Pilios	12,46%
6	Epaminondas Pantelakis	6,64%
7	Ahmad Mendes Moreira	5,20%
8	Carles Soria	3,25%
9	Kevin Rosero	2,81%
10	Claudiu Bălan	1,47%
