= 2019–20 Aris Thessaloniki F.C. season =

Aris Thessaloniki
- President: Theodoros A. Karipidis
- Manager: Savvas Pantelidis (until 31 August 2019); Apostolos Terzis (from 10 September 2019 until 8 October 2019); Michael Oenning (from 12 October 2019)
- Stadium: Kleanthis Vikelidis Stadium
- Super League 1: 5th
- Greek Cup: Semi-finals
- UEFA Europa League: Third qualifying round
- Top goalscorer: League: Bruno Gama (12); All: Bruno Gama (13)
Home colours	Away colours	Third colours

The 2019–20 season was the second consecutive campaign for Aris in the Super League 1 after its return to the top division of Greece. The club also competed in the Greek Cup and the UEFA Europa League.

Aris were eliminated in the third qualifying round of the UEFA Europa League by the Norwegian Molde FK.

== First-team squad ==
#	Name	Nationality	Position(s)	Date of birth (age)	Signed from
Goalkeepers
1	Fabian Ehmann	(Austria)	GK	August 28, 1998 (aged 21)	(Austria) Sturm Graz
23	Julián Cuesta	(Spain)	GK	March 28, 1991 (aged 29)	(Poland) Wisła Kraków
Defenders
3	Hugo Sousa	(Portugal)	CB / RB	June 4, 1992 (aged 28)	Free Agent
5	Georgios Delizisis (captain)	(Greece)	CB	December 1, 1987 (aged 32)	(Greece) Apollon Smyrnis
21	Daniel Sundgren	(Sweden)	RB / RM / DM	November 22, 1990 (aged 29)	(Sweden) AIK Fotboll
31	Panagiotis Tsagalidis	(Greece)	LB	March 5, 2001 (aged 19)	Club's Academy
40	Petros Bagalianis	(Greece)	CB	February 6, 2001 (aged 19)	Club's Academy
92	Lindsay Rose	(Mauritius) / (France)	CB / RB	February 8, 1992 (aged 28)	(France) Lorient
Midfielders
8	Lerin Duarte	(Netherlands) / (Cape Verde)	CM / AM	August 11, 1990 (aged 29)	(Netherlands) Heracles Almelo
18	Nicolás Martínez	(Argentina) / (Portugal)	AM / CM / LW	September 25, 1987 (aged 32)	(Greece) Olympiacos
24	Daniel Mancini	(Argentina) / (Italy)	RM / CM / LM	November 11, 1996 (aged 23)	(France) Girondins de Bordeaux
26	Javier Matilla	(Spain)	CM / DM	August 16, 1988 (aged 31)	(Spain) Gimnàstic de Tarragona
38	Petros Bakoutsis	(Greece)	CM / DM / AM	June 29, 2001 (aged 19)	Club's Academy
88	Lucas Sasha	(Brazil) / (Italy)	DM / LB / RB	March 1, 1990 (aged 30)	(Bulgaria) Ludogorets Razgrad
Forwards
9	Dimitris Diamantopoulos (vice-captain)	(Greece)	ST / RW	November 18, 1988 (aged 31)	(Greece) Apollon Smyrnis
16	Bruno Gama	(Portugal)	RW / LW / SS	November 15, 1987 (aged 32)	(Spain) Alcorcón
28	Giannis Fetfatzidis	(Greece)	LW / RW / AM	December 21, 1990 (aged 29)	(Greece) Olympiacos

== Transfers and loans ==
=== Transfers in ===
Entry date	Position	No.	Player	From club	Fee	Ref.
June 2019	MF	8	(Netherlands) / (Cape Verde) Lerin Duarte	(Netherlands) Heracles Almelo	Free	
June 2019	FW	11	(Nigeria) Brown Ideye	Free Agent	Free	
June 2019	GK	1	(Austria) Fabian Ehmann	(Austria) Sturm Graz	Free	
June 2019	DF	92	(Mauritius) / (France) Lindsay Rose	(France) Lorient	170.000 €	
July 2019	MF	88	(Brazil) / (Italy) Lucas Sasha	(Bulgaria) Ludogorets Razgrad	Free	
July 2019	DF	21	(Sweden) Daniel Sundgren	(Sweden) AIK Fotboll	120.000 €	
August 2019	MF	24	(Argentina) / (Italy) Daniel Mancini	(France) Girondins de Bordeaux	500.000 €	
August 2019	GK	75	(Greece) Apostolos Tsilingiris	(Greece) Iródotos	Free	

=== Transfers out ===
Exit date	Position	No.	Player	To club	Fee	Ref.
June 2019	MF	14	(Greece) Charalampos Pavlidis	(Greece) Apollon Smyrnis	Released	
June 2019	GK	1	(Greece) Alexandros Anagnostopoulos	(Greece) Apollon Smyrnis	Released	
July 2019	MF	32	(Greece) Manolis Siopis	(Turkey) Alanyaspor	500.000 €	
July 2019	MF	20	(Greece) Dimitris Anakoglou	(Greece) Lamia	Released	
July 2019	DF	15	(Greece) Giorgos Valerianos	(Cyprus) Pafos	Released	
July 2019	GK	22	(Greece) Giorgos Kantimiris	Free Agent	Released	
July 2019	MF	39	(Greece) Paraskevas Kallidis	Free Agent	Released	
August 2019	DF	27	(Greece) Manolis Tzanakakis	Free Agent	Released	
August 2019	FW	84	(Greece) Andreas Stamatis	(Greece) Trikala	Released	
August 2019	DF	12	(Greece) / (Australia) Charalampos Stampoulidis	(Spain) Extremadura	Released	
August 2019	MF	88	(Greece) Kyriakos Savvidis	(Slovakia) MFK Zemplín Michalovce	Released	
August 2019	MF	8	(Greece) Lefteris Intzoglou	(Greece) Panachaiki	Released	
September 2019	FW	21	(Tunisia) Hamza Younés	(Romania) Petrolul Ploiești	Released	
September 2019	MF	6	(Albania) / (Switzerland) Migjen Basha	(Australia) Melbourne Victory	Released	
January 2020	DF	31	(Spain) Álex Menéndez	Free Agent	Released	
January 2020	DF	22	(Greece) Dimitris Konstantinidis	(Slovakia) MFK Zemplín Michalovce	Released	
June 2020	GK	75	(Greece) Apostolos Tsilingiris	Free Agent	Released	
June 2020	DF	44	(Spain) Fran Vélez	Free Agent	Released	
June 2020	FW	7	(France) Nicolas Diguiny	Free Agent	Released	
June 2020	FW	10	(Sweden) Daniel Larsson	Free Agent	Released	
June 2020	FW	11	(Nigeria) Brown Ideye	Free Agent	Released	
June 2020	FW	19	(Argentina) Martín Tonso	Free Agent	Released	
July 2020	DF	69	(Hungary) Mihály Korhut	Free Agent	Released	

=== Loans in ===
Start date	End date	Position	No.	Player	From club	Fee	Ref.
September 2019	30 June 2020	MF	98	(France) / (Senegal) Abou Ba	(France) Nantes	None	
January 2020	30 June 2020	FW	96	(Greece) / (Albania) Fiorin Durmishaj	(Greece) Olympiacos	None	

=== Transfer summary ===
Spending

Summer: ▼790.000 €

Winter: 0 €

Total: ▼790.000 €

Income

Summer: ▲500.000 €

Winter: 0 €

Total: ▲500.000 €

Net Expenditure

Summer: ▼290.000 €

Winter: 0 €

Total: ▼290.000 €

== Competitions ==
=== Overall ===
Competition	Started round	Current position / round	Final position / round	First match	Last match
Super League 1	Matchday 1	—	5th	24 August 2019	19 July 2020
Regular Season	Matchday 1	—	6th	24 August 2019	1 March 2020
Championship Round	Matchday 1	—	5th	6 June 2020	19 July 2020
Greek Cup	Round of 16	—	Semi-finals	8 January 2020	24 June 2020
UEFA Europa League	Second qualifying round	—	Third qualifying round	17 September 2019	15 August 2019

Updated to match played 19 July 2020
Source: Competitions

=== Overview ===
Competition	Record							
Competition	G	W	D	L	GF	GA	GD	Win %
Super League 1	36	10	12	14	48	51	−3	27.78
Greek Cup	6	3	2	1	7	5	+2	50.00
UEFA Europa League	4	2	1	1	4	4	+0	50.00
Total	46	15	15	16	59	60	−1	32.61

Updated to match played 19 July 2020
Source: Competitions

Super League 1	Record							
Super League 1	G	W	D	L	GF	GA	GD	Win %
Regular Season	26	8	10	8	38	32	+6	30.77
Championship Round	10	2	2	6	10	19	−9	20.00
Total	36	10	12	14	48	51	−3	27.78

Updated to match played 19 July 2020
Source: Competitions

==== Managers' Overview ====
Manager	Nat.	From	Until	Record							
Manager	Nat.	From	Until	G	W	D	L	GF	GA	GD	Win %
Savvas Pantelidis	(Greece)	Start of Season	31 August 2019	6	2	2	2	5	6	−1	33.33
Apostolos Terzis	(Greece)	2 September 2019	11 October 2019	4	1	1	2	9	7	+2	25.00
Michael Oenning	(Germany)	12 October 2019	End of Season	36	12	12	12	45	47	−2	33.33

Updated to match played 19 July 2020
Source: Competitions

=== Super League 1 ===
==== Regular season ====
===== League table =====
Pos	Team	Pld	W	D	L	GF	GA	GD	Pts	Qualification
4	Panathinaikos	26	12	8	6	35	23	+12	44	Qualification for the Play-off round
5	OFI	26	10	4	12	35	35	0	34 (Note: Head-to-head points: OFI 4, Aris 1.)	Qualification for the Play-off round
6	Aris	26	8	10	8	38	32	+6	34	Qualification for the Play-off round
7	Atromitos	26	9	5	12	31	36	−5	32	Qualification for the Play-out round
8	AEL	26	7	9	10	28	33	−5	30 (Note: Head-to-head points: AEL 4, Asteras Tripolis 1.)	Qualification for the Play-out round

Source: Super League Greece
Rules for classification: 1) Points; 2) Head-to-head points; 3) Head-to-head goal difference; 4) Goal difference; 5) Goals scored; 6) Play-offs (neutral ground).
(Note: Criteria 6 is only used if needed to decide champion, teams for relegation or teams for UEFA competitions).

===== Results summary =====
Overall								Home						Away					
Pld	W	D	L	GF	GA	GD	Pts	W	D	L	GF	GA	GD	W	D	L	GF	GA	GD
26	8	10	8	38	32	+6	34	7	2	4	25	13	+12	1	8	4	13	19	−6

Last updated: 1 March 2020.
Source: Super League

===== Results by matchday =====
Matchday	1	2	3	4	5	6	7	8	9	10	11	12	13	14	15	16	17	18	19	20	21	22	23	24	25	26
Ground	H	A	H	A	H	H	A	H	A	H	A	H	A	A	H	A	H	A	A	H	A	H	A	H	A	H
Result	D	L	W	D	L	L	W	W	D	W	D	D	D	L	W	D	W	D	L	W	L	W	D	L	D	L
Position	6	11	7	7	8	9	9	8	7	7	4	7	7	9	5	6	4	4	8	5	5	5	5	5	5	6

Updated to match(es) played on 1 March 2020. Source:
A = Away; H = Home; W = Win; D = Draw; L = Loss; P = Postponed

==== Play-off round ====
===== League table =====
Pos	Team	Pld	W	D	L	GF	GA	GD	Pts	Qualification
1	Olympiacos (C)	36	28	7	1	74	16	+58	91	Qualification for the Champions League play-off round
2	PAOK	36	21	10	5	58	29	+29	73	Qualification for the Champions League second qualifying round
3	AEK Athens	36	20	9	7	59	32	+27	69	Qualification for the Europa League third qualifying round
4	Panathinaikos (Note: Panathinaikos were banned from UEFA club competitions for the first season they would qualify between the 2018–19 and 2020–21 seasons by the UEFA Club Financial Control Body on 24 April 2018 due to overdue payables, and since they did not qualify for either the 2018–19 or 2019–20 season, they were banned from the 2020–21 season.)	36	15	13	8	43	32	+11	58	
5	Aris Thessaloniki	36	10	12	14	48	51	−3	42	Qualification for the Europa League second qualifying round
6	OFI	36	10	6	20	41	54	−13	36	Qualification for the Europa League second qualifying round

Source: Superleague Greece, Soccerway
Rules for classification: 1) Points; 2) Head-to-head points; 3) Head-to-head goal difference; 4) Goals scored; 5) Goals against; 6) Play-offs (neutral ground); 7) Draw.
(Note: Criteria 6 is only used if needed to decide champion, teams for relegation or teams for UEFA competitions).
(C) Champions

===== Results summary =====
Overall								Home						Away					
Pld	W	D	L	GF	GA	GD	Pts	W	D	L	GF	GA	GD	W	D	L	GF	GA	GD
10	2	2	6	10	19	−9	8	1	0	4	6	12	−6	1	2	2	4	7	−3

Last updated: 1 March 2020.
Source: Super League

===== Results by matchday =====
Matchday	1	2	3	4	5	6	7	8	9	10
Ground	H	A	A	H	A	H	H	A	H	A
Result	W	L	D	L	L	L	L	W	L	D
Position	5	5	5	5	5	5	5	5	5	5

Updated to match(es) played on 19 July 2020. Source:
A = Away; H = Home; W = Win; D = Draw; L = Loss; P = Postponed

==== Matches ====
===== Regular season =====
24 August 2019 1	Aris Thessaloniki	1 – 1	OFI	Thessaloniki
21:00 EEST	Georgios Delizisis (yellow card) 42'; Lucas Sasha 69'	Report	Miguel Mellado 18'; Adil Nabi (yellow card) 51'; Nikos Korovesis (yellow card) 55'; Miguel Mellado (yellow card) 74'; Juan Neira (yellow card) 74'	Stadium: Kleanthis Vikelidis Stadium; Attendance: 12,306; Referee: Evangelos Manouhos

31 August 2019 2	Volos	1 – 0	Aris Thessaloniki	Volos
21:30 EEST	Erik Jendrišek 55' (pen.)	Report	Lucas Sasha (yellow card) 54'	Stadium: Panthessaliko Stadium; Attendance: 1,677; Referee: Georgios Kominis

15 September 2019 3	Aris Thessaloniki	4 – 0	Panathinaikos	Thessaloniki
21:30 EEST	Giannis Fetfatzidis 20'; Fran Vélez 43'; Nicolas Diguiny 54'; Brown Ideye 64'; Javier Matilla (yellow card) 74'	Report	Emanuel Insúa (yellow card) 67'; Anastasios Chatzigiovanis (yellow card) 71'; Federico Macheda (yellow card) 87'; Mattias Johansson (yellow card) 90+1'	Stadium: Kleanthis Vikelidis Stadium; Attendance: 13,129; Referee: Vassilios Fotias

22 September 2019 4	PAOK	2 – 2	Aris Thessaloniki	Thessaloniki
18:30 EEST	Léo Matos 5' (yellow card) 28' (yellow-red card) 67'; Chuba Akpom (yellow card) 29'; Josip Mišić (yellow card) 61' (goal) 90+7'	Report	Brown Ideye 3' (yellow card) 78'; Nicolas Diguiny (yellow card) 17'; Lucas Sasha (yellow card) 37' (yellow-red card) 71'; Bruno Gama (yellow card) 64'; Daniel Sundgren (yellow card) 84'; Javier Matilla 87' (yellow card) 88'	Stadium: Toumba Stadium; Attendance: 23,926; Referee: Anastasios Sidiropoulos

28 September 2019 5	Aris Thessaloniki	2 – 3	AEL	Thessaloniki
17:15 EEST	Fran Vélez 10'; Bruno Gama 12'; Abou Ba (yellow card) 44'; Daniel Sundgren (yellow card) 88'	Report	Marko Nunić 20' 33'; Amr Warda (yellow card) 33' (goal) 74'; Manolis Bertos (yellow card) 56'; Ögmundur Kristinsson (yellow card) 78'; Jonathan Bustos (yellow card) 84'; Fatjon Andoni (yellow card) 88'	Stadium: Kleanthis Vikelidis Stadium; Attendance: 12,134; Referee: Vassilios Fotias

6 October 2019 6	Aris Thessaloniki	1 – 2	Olympiacos	Thessaloniki
19:30 EEST	Nicolas Diguiny 7'; Bruno Gama (yellow card) 46'; Mihály Korhut (yellow card) 65'; Daniel Sundgren (yellow card) 69'; Martín Tonso (yellow card) 90+5'	Report	Georgios Masouras 33'; Youssef El-Arabi 38'; Vasilis Torosidis (yellow card) 58'; Avraam Papadopoulos (yellow card) 69'; Rúben Semedo (yellow card) 77'; Guilherme (yellow card) 90+4'; José Sá (yellow card) 90+5'	Stadium: Kleanthis Vikelidis Stadium; Attendance: 13,143; Referee: Georgios Tzovaras

20 October 2019 7	Xanthi	0 – 1	Aris Thessaloniki	Xanthi
17:00 EEST	Christos Lisgaras (yellow card) 48'; Mehdi Terki (yellow card) 70'; Vasilios Fasidis (yellow card) 79'	Report	Bruno Gama 3' (pen.); Lucas Sasha (yellow card) 43'; Lindsay Rose (yellow card) 70'; Daniel Larsson (yellow card) 86'	Stadium: Xanthi FC Arena; Attendance: 1,579; Referee: Dimitrios Karantonis

27 October 2019 8	Aris Thessaloniki	2 – 0	Panetolikos	Thessaloniki
17:15 EEST	Bruno Gama 27' (pen.); Brown Ideye 31' (pen.) (yellow card) 55'; Lucas Sasha (yellow card) 45+1'; Mihály Korhut (yellow card) 53'; Lerin Duarte (yellow card) 70'	Report	Jorge Díaz (yellow card) 31'; Vlad Morar (yellow card) 34' (yellow-red card) 60'	Stadium: Kleanthis Vikelidis Stadium; Attendance: 9,972; Referee: Petros Tsagarakis

2 November 2019 9	Panionios	1 – 1	Aris Thessaloniki	Athens
19:30 EEST	Novica Maksimović (yellow card) 8'; Panagiotis Korbos (yellow card) 13'; Nemanja Milojević (yellow card) 46' (yellow-red card) 48'; Pedro Arce 66'; Bachana Arabuli (yellow card) 70'; Odysseas Lymperakis (yellow card) 76'	Report	Bruno Gama (yellow card) 15'; Fran Vélez (yellow card) 19'; Lindsay Rose 85'	Stadium: Nea Smyrni Stadium; Attendance: 1,557; Referee: Evangelos Manouhos

10 November 2019 10	Aris Thessaloniki	2 – 1	Asteras Tripolis	Thessaloniki
15:00 EEST	Lucas Sasha 5'; Nicolas Diguiny 34' (yellow card) 57'; Brown Ideye (yellow card) 82'; Fabian Ehmann (red card) 87'	Report	Patricio Matricardi (yellow card) 21'; Jerónimo Barrales (yellow card) 30'; Luis Fernández 41'; José Luis Valiente (yellow card) 76'	Stadium: Kleanthis Vikelidis Stadium; Attendance: 9,012; Referee: Alexandros Katsikogiannis

24 November 2019 11	AEK Athens	1 – 1	Aris Thessaloniki	Athens
19:30 EEST	Hélder Lopes (yellow card) 30'; Petros Mantalos (yellow card) 47' (goal) 81' (pen.); Giorgos Giakoumakis (yellow card) 80'; Ognjen Vranješ (yellow card) 81'	Report	Brown Ideye (red card) 53'; Daniel Larsson 64'; Lindsay Rose (yellow card) 78'; Mihály Korhut (yellow card) 80'; Fran Vélez (yellow card) 80'	Stadium: Olympic Stadium; Attendance: 13,087; Referee: Angelos Evangelou

1 December 2019 12	Aris Thessaloniki	1 – 1	Lamia	Thessaloniki
17:15 EEST	Daniel Larsson 32'; Javier Matilla (yellow card) 90+1'	Report	Rogério Thuram 16'; Vasileios Pliatsikas (yellow card) 22'	Stadium: Kleanthis Vikelidis Stadium; Attendance: 9,393; Referee: Georgios Vreskas

8 December 2019 13	Atromitos	2 – 2	Aris Thessaloniki	Athens
19:30 EEST	Apostolos Vellios 24'; Charis Charisis (yellow card) 75'; Giorgos Manousos 86' (pen.)	Report	Abou Ba (yellow card) 29'; Bruno Gama 45+1'; Giannis Fetfatzidis 90+2'	Stadium: Peristeri Stadium; Attendance: 1,491; Referee: Aristotelis Diamantopoulos

14 December 2019 14	OFI	3 – 1	Aris Thessaloniki	Heraklion
17:15 EEST	Ricardo Vaz 30' (yellow card) 36'; Felipe Souza 71'; João Figueiredo 73' (yellow card) 75'; Nikos Marinakis (yellow card) 82'	Report	Brown Ideye 12'; Javier Matilla (yellow card) 36'	Stadium: Theodoros Vardinogiannis Stadium; Attendance: 3,511; Referee: Georgios Kominis

19 December 2019 15	Aris Thessaloniki	4 – 0	Volos	Thessaloniki
17:15 EEST	Brown Ideye 12' 24'; Bruno Gama 30' (pen.) 61'	Report	Augusto Max (yellow card) 80'; Fernando Joao (yellow card) 90'	Stadium: Kleanthis Vikelidis Stadium; Attendance: 6,649; Referee: Athanassios Tzilos

22 December 2019 16	Panathinaikos	0 – 0	Aris Thessaloniki	Athens
19:30 EEST	Christos Donis (yellow card) 39'	Report		Stadium: Olympic Stadium; Attendance: 5,373; Referee: Aristotelis Diamantopoulos

4 January 2020 17	Aris Thessaloniki	4 – 2	PAOK	Thessaloniki
19:30 EEST	Daniel Larsson 17'; Fran Vélez 41'; Lindsay Rose 47' (yellow card) 51'; Lucas Sasha 70'	Report	Karol Świderski 10'; Sverrir Ingi Ingason (yellow card) 69'; Léo Matos 77'; Dimitris Giannoulis (yellow card) 80'	Stadium: Kleanthis Vikelidis Stadium; Attendance: 16,249; Referee: Anastasios Papapetrou

11 January 2020 18	AEL	0 – 0	Aris Thessaloniki	Larissa
19:30 EEST	Thanasis Papazoglou (yellow card) 50'; Adnan Šećerović (yellow card) 88'	Report	Lucas Sasha (yellow card) 40'; Bruno Gama (yellow card) 70'; Abou Ba (yellow card) 83'	Stadium: AEL FC Arena; Attendance: 2,569; Referee: Dimitrios Karantonis

19 January 2020 19	Olympiacos	4 – 2	Aris Thessaloniki	Piraeus
19:30 EEST	Andreas Bouchalakis (yellow card) 20'; Guilherme Torres 22'; Youssef El-Arabi 24'; Mady Camara (yellow card) 28'; Omar Elabdellaoui 44'; Mathieu Valbuena 63' (pen.)	Report	Lindsay Rose 37'; Daniel Mancini (yellow card) 45+1'; Nicolas Diguiny (yellow card) 59' (goal) 83'; Fran Vélez (yellow card) 61'; Mihály Korhut (yellow card) 80'	Stadium: Karaiskakis Stadium; Attendance: 25,622; Referee: Georgios Tzovaras

23 January 2020 20	Aris Thessaloniki	1 – 0	Xanthi	Thessaloniki
19:30 EEST	Fran Vélez (yellow card) 49'; Bruno Gama 58' (pen.); Lindsay Rose (yellow card) 60'; Mihály Korhut (yellow card) 71'	Report	Jordan Faucher (yellow card) 26'; Aleksandar Kovačević (yellow card) 38'; Dimos Baxevanidis (yellow card) 56'; Petar Đuričković (yellow card) 75'	Stadium: Kleanthis Vikelidis Stadium; Attendance: 5,945; Referee: Fotios Fotiadis

26 January 2020 21	Panetolikos	2 – 0	Aris Thessaloniki	Agrinio
17:15 EEST	Igor Jovanović (yellow card) 47'; Farley Vieira Rosa 58' 73'	Report	Giorgos Delizisis (yellow card) 43'; Martín Tonso (yellow card) 90+5'	Stadium: Panetolikos Stadium; Attendance: 2,283; Referee: Aristotelis Diamantopoulos

2 February 2020 22	Aris Thessaloniki	2 – 0	Panionios	Thessaloniki
15:00 EEST	Bruno Gama 31'; Giannis Fetfatzidis 42'; Javier Matilla (yellow card) 85'	Report	Giannis Kiakos (yellow card) 17'; Odysseas Lymperakis (yellow card) 33'; Oumar Camara (yellow card) 67' (yellow-red card) 80'	Stadium: Kleanthis Vikelidis Stadium; Attendance: 7,945; Referee: Georgios Tassis

9 February 2020 23	Asteras Tripolis	1 – 1	Aris Thessaloniki	Tripoli
15:00 EEST	Fran Vélez 13'; Daniel Larsson (yellow card) 65'; Bruno Gama (yellow card) 71'	Report	Marc Fernández 26' (yellow card) 40'; Jerónimo Barrales (yellow card) 64'; Walter Iglesias (yellow card) 79'	Stadium: Theodoros Kolokotronis Stadium; Attendance: 2,210; Referee: Alexandros Tsamouris

16 February 2020 24	Aris Thessaloniki	0 – 1	AEK Athens	Thessaloniki
19:30 EEST	Giannis Fetfatzidis (yellow card) 40'	Report	Christos Albanis 5'; Stratos Svarnas (yellow card) 30'; Ognjen Vranješ (yellow card) 31'; Damian Szymański (yellow card) 39'; Marios Oikonomou (yellow card) 82'	Stadium: Kleanthis Vikelidis Stadium; Attendance: 11,324; Referee: Dimitrios Karantonis

22 February 2020 25	Lamia	2 – 2	Aris Thessaloniki	Lamia
20:00 EEST	Ibrahima Niasse (yellow card) 21'; Christos Aravidis 24' (yellow card) 26' (goal) 48'; Giannis Skondras (yellow card) 60'	Report	Fran Vélez (yellow card) 12'; Giorgos Delizisis (yellow card) 32'; Daniel Larsson 52'; Brown Ideye 54'; Lindsay Rose (yellow card) 74'	Stadium: Lamia Municipal Stadium; Attendance: 1,634; Referee: Vassilios Fotias

1 March 2020 26	Aris Thessaloniki	1 – 2	Atromitos	Thessaloniki
19:00 EEST	Nicolas Diguiny 48'; Hugo Sousa (yellow card) 86'; Daniel Mancini (yellow card) 90+7'	Report	Clarck N'Sikulu (yellow card) 36' (goal) 52'; Thanasis Androutsos (yellow card) 54'; Rodrigo Galo 60' (yellow card) 63'; Nill De Pauw (yellow card) 76'; Charis Charisis (yellow card) 89'; Giorgos Manousos (yellow card) 90'; Javier Umbides (yellow card) 90+4'	Stadium: Kleanthis Vikelidis Stadium; Attendance: 6,240; Referee: Athanassios Tzilos

===== Play-off Round =====
6 June 2020 1	Aris Thessaloniki	3 – 1	OFI	Thessaloniki
21:30 EEST	Brown Ideye (yellow card) 30'; Bruno Gama 42', 73'; Mihály Korhut 80'	Report	Vajebah Sakor 21'; Nikos Marinakis (yellow card) 53'; Lisandro Semedo (yellow card) 56'; Adil Nabi (yellow card) 78'	Stadium: Kleanthis Vikelidis Stadium; Referee: Aristotelis Diamantopoulos

14 June 2020 2	Olympiacos	3 – 1	Aris Thessaloniki	Piraeus
21:30 EEST	Mady Camara 27', 28'; Georgios Masouras 38'; Pape Abou Cissé (yellow card) 72'	Report	Fran Vélez (yellow card) 54'; Brown Ideye 64'	Stadium: Karaiskakis Stadium; Referee: Evangelos Manouhos

20 June 2020 3	AEK Athens	2 – 2	Aris Thessaloniki	Athens
21:30 EEST	Petros Mantalos (yellow card) 54'; Sergio Araujo 62'; Marios Oikonomou (yellow card) 75'; Nélson Oliveira 86' (pen.); Damian Szymański (yellow card) 88'	Report	Bruno Gama 55' (pen.); Abou Ba (yellow card) 73'; Nicolás Martínez 75'; Daniel Mancini (yellow card) 79'	Stadium: Olympic Stadium; Referee: Anastasios Papapetrou

28 June 2020 4	Aris Thessaloniki	0 – 2	PAOK	Thessaloniki
19:15 EEST	Javier Matilla (yellow card) 33'; Martín Tonso (yellow card) 35'; Lucas Sasha (yellow card) 40'; Abou Ba (yellow card) 57'; Giorgos Delizisis (red card) 90+1'	Report	Maurício (yellow card) 4'; Léo Matos (yellow card) 15'; Fernando Varela 36'; Karol Świderski 45+4'; Christos Tzolis (yellow card) 65'; Alexandros Paschalakis (yellow card) 87'	Stadium: Kleanthis Vikelidis Stadium; Referee: Felix Zwayer (Germany)

1 July 2020 5	Panathinaikos	2 – 0	Aris Thessaloniki	Athens
19:15 EEST	Dimitrios Kourbelis 41', (yellow card) 42'; Yassin Ayoub (yellow card) 42'; Dimitrios Kolovetsios 88'	Report	Lucas Sasha (yellow card) 30'; Daniel Mancini (yellow card) 42'; Bruno Gama (yellow card) 90+2'	Stadium: Olympic Stadium; Referee: Angelos Evangelou

5 July 2020 6	Aris Thessaloniki	1 – 4	AEK Athens	Thessaloniki
19:15 EEST	Bruno Gama 29'; Javier Matilla (yellow card) 55'	Report	Paulinho (yellow card) 7'; Nélson Oliveira 24', 52'; Hélder Lopes (yellow card) 55'; André Simões 62'; Damian Szymański 84'	Stadium: Kleanthis Vikelidis Stadium; Referee: Aleksei Kulbakov (Belarus)

8 July 2020 7	Aris Thessaloniki	2 – 4	Olympiacos	Thessaloniki
19:15 EEST	Giannis Fetfatzidis 56'; Petros Bagalianis 87'; Javier Matilla (yellow card) 90+4'	Report	Georgios Masouras 34', 49'; Cafú (yellow card) 42'; Ahmed Hassan 45+1', 66' (pen.); Bruno (yellow card) 90'	Stadium: Kleanthis Vikelidis Stadium; Referee: Aristomenis Koutsiaftis

11 July 2020 8	OFI	0 – 1	Aris Thessaloniki	Heraklion
21:30 EEST	João Figueiredo (yellow card) 29' (yellow-red card) 90+3'; Miguel Mellado (yellow card) 38'; Kostas Giannoulis (yellow card) 53'; Juan Neira (yellow card) 81'; Georgios Koutroumpis (yellow card) 90+2'	Report	Giannis Fetfatzidis 14'; Mihály Korhut (yellow card) 31'; Petros Bagalianis (yellow card) 52'; Daniel Mancini (yellow card) 68'; Julián Cuesta (yellow card) 90+5'	Stadium: Theodoros Vardinogiannis Stadium; Referee: Petros Tsagarakis

15 July 2020 9	Aris Thessaloniki	0 – 1	Panathinaikos	Thessaloniki
19:15 EEST	Lindsay Rose (yellow card) 44' (yellow-red card) 86'; Lucas Sasha (yellow card) 65'; Giorgos Delizisis (yellow card) 86'; Petros Bagalianis (yellow card) 90+1'	Report	Tasos Chatzigiovanis (yellow card) 18'; Anuar Tuhami (yellow card) 64'; Dimitris Kolovos 75'	Stadium: Kleanthis Vikelidis Stadium; Referee: Georgios Vreskas

19 July 2020 10	PAOK	0 – 0	Aris Thessaloniki	Thessaloniki
20:00 EEST	Omar El Kaddouri (yellow card) 18'; Karol Świderski (yellow card) 45'; Vieirinha (red card) 90+5'	Report	Javier Matilla (yellow card) 59'; Hugo Sousa (yellow card) 86'; Daniel Mancini (yellow card) 89'	Stadium: Toumba Stadium; Referee: Clément Turpin (France)

=== Greek Cup ===
Aris Thessaloniki entered the competition in the Round of 16 because it finished 5th in the previous season of the Super League. The final five clubs of the last Super League are introduced to the tournament in the Round of 16 and they are seeded in the draw. In the draws for the quarter-finals onwards, there are no seedings.

==== Round of 16 ====
8 January 2020 First leg	Xanthi	0 – 1	Aris Thessaloniki	Xanthi
20:30 EEST	Christos Lisgaras (yellow card) 10'; Petar Đuričković (yellow card) 48'	Report	Brown Ideye 57'; Fiorin Durmishaj (yellow card) 82'	Stadium: Xanthi FC Arena; Referee: Stefanos Koubarakis

14 January 2020 Second leg	Aris Thessaloniki	2 – 1 (3–1 agg.)	Xanthi	Thessaloniki
18:30 EEST	Lucas Sasha 42'; Brown Ideye 59'; Georgios Delizisis (yellow card) 86'; Petros Bakoutsis (yellow card) 90+4'	Report	Vasilios Fasidis (yellow card) 2'; Jordan Faucher 22'; Fábio Sturgeon (yellow card) 65'; Petar Đuričković (yellow card) 90+1'	Stadium: Kleanthis Vikelidis Stadium; Referee: Aristomenis Koutsiavtis

==== Quarter-finals ====
6 February 2020 First leg	Aris Thessaloniki	0 – 0	Atromitos	Thessaloniki
19:00 EEST	Fran Vélez (yellow card) 20'; Lucas Sasha (yellow card) 37'	Report	Alexandros Katranis (yellow card) 49'; Apostolos Vellios (yellow card) 77'	Stadium: Kleanthis Vikelidis Stadium; Referee: Aristidis Vatsios

13 February 2020 Second leg	Atromitos	0 – 1 (0–1 agg.)	Aris Thessaloniki	Athens
19:00 EEST	Thanasis Androutsos (yellow card) 48'; Georgios Daviotis (yellow card) 52'; Dimitrios Goutas (yellow card) 57'; Giorgos Manousos (yellow card) 78'	Report	Daniel Larsson 15'; Javier Matilla (yellow card) 31'; Brown Ideye (yellow card) 42'; Daniel Sundgren (yellow card) 90+3'	Stadium: Peristeri Stadium; Referee: Georgios Vreskas

==== Semi-finals ====
4 March 2020 First leg	AEK Athens	2 – 1	Aris Thessaloniki	Athens
18:30 EEST	Petros Mantalos 8'; Ognjen Vranješ (yellow card) 17', (goal) 57'; Nenad Krstičić (yellow card) 76'	Report	Bruno Gama 11' (pen.); Brown Ideye (yellow card) 18'; Lucas Sasha (yellow card) 33'; Javier Matilla (red card) 52'; Abou Ba (yellow card) 76'; Julián Cuesta (yellow card) 88'	Stadium: Olympic Stadium; Referee: Artur Soares Dias (Portugal)

24 June 2020 Second leg	Aris Thessaloniki	2 – 2 (a.e.t.) (2–3 agg.)	AEK Athens	Thessaloniki
19:00 EEST	Daniel Mancini 57', (yellow card) 84'; Javier Matilla (yellow card) 81'; Nicolas Diguiny 90+3'; Lucas Sasha (yellow card) 120+3'	Report	André Simões (yellow card) 54' (yellow-red card) 120+3'; Marko Livaja 90+6', 102'; Petros Mantalos (yellow card) 94' (yellow-red card) 120+1'; Nélson Oliveira (yellow card) 103' (yellow-red card) 120+1'	Stadium: Kleanthis Vikelidis Stadium; Referee: Danny Makkelie (Netherlands)

=== UEFA Europa League ===
Aris Thessaloniki finished 5th in the 2018–19 Super League Greece and entered the competition in the Second qualifying round.

==== Second Qualifying Round ====
25 July 2019 First leg	Aris Thessaloniki (Greece)	0 – 0	(Cyprus) AEL Limassol	Thessaloniki
21:30 EEST	Giannis Fetfatzidis (yellow card) 29'; Migjen Basha (yellow card) 34'; Brown Ideye (yellow card) 36'; Daniel Sundgren (yellow card) 90+2'	Report	Marko Adamović (yellow card) 34'; Jon Gaztañaga (yellow card) 36'; Christos Wheeler (yellow card) 71'; André Teixeira (yellow card) 80'; Vozinha (yellow card) 90'; Gevorg Ghazaryan (yellow card) 90+2'	Stadium: Kleanthis Vikelidis Stadium; Attendance: 17,488; Referee: Stuart Attwell (England)

1 August 2019 Second leg	AEL Limassol (Cyprus)	0 – 1 (0–1 agg.)	(Greece) Aris Thessaloniki	Larnaca
20:00 EEST	Boris Godál (yellow card) 17' (yellow-red card) 83'; André Teixeira (yellow card) 39'; Christos Wheeler (yellow card) 42'; Jon Gaztañaga (yellow card) 77'; Jarchinio Antonia (yellow card) 90+1'	Report	Nicolas Diguiny 14' (pen.) (yellow card) 42'; Julián Cuesta (yellow card) 33'; Javier Matilla (yellow card) 36'; Fran Vélez (yellow card) 39'; Mihály Korhut (yellow card) 44'; Daniel Sundgren (yellow card) 61'	Stadium: AEK Arena – Georgios Karapatakis; Attendance: 3,346; Referee: Jorge Sousa (Portugal)

==== Third Qualifying Round ====
8 August 2019 First leg	Molde (Norway)	3 – 0	(Greece) Aris Thessaloniki	Molde
20:00 EEST	Magnus Eikrem 27'; Etzaz Hussain (yellow card) 32'; Eirik Hestad 32'; Martin Ellingsen 87'; Kristoffer Haugen (yellow card) 90'; Erling Knudtzon (yellow card) 90+4'	Report	Fran Vélez (red card) 64'; Giorgos Delizisis (yellow card) 69'	Stadium: Aker Stadion; Attendance: 3,953; Referee: Maurizio Mariani (Italy)

15 August 2019 Second leg	Aris Thessaloniki (Greece)	3 – 1 (a.e.t.) (3–4 agg.)	(Norway) Molde	Thessaloniki
21:30 EEST	Javier Matilla 25' (yellow card) 90+3'; Mihály Korhut (yellow card) 33'; Giorgos Delizisis 37'; Nicolas Diguiny 84' (yellow card) 119'; Daniel Sundgren (yellow card) 90+2'	Report	Eirik Hestad (yellow card) 24'; Etzaz Hussain (yellow card) 35'; Magnus Eikrem (yellow card) 75'; Ohi Omoijuanfo (yellow card) 78'; Leke James (yellow card) 90+2'; Mathis Bolly 105+1' (yellow card) 115'	Stadium: Kleanthis Vikelidis Stadium; Attendance: 12,821; Referee: Robert Harvey (Ireland)

== Squad statistics ==
=== Appearances ===
As of match played 19 July 2020

#	Position	Nat.	Player	Super League 1		Greek Cup		UEFA Europa League		Total	
#	Position	Nat.	Player	Apps	Starts	Apps	Starts	Apps	Starts	Apps	Starts
1	GK	(Austria)	Fabian Ehmann	12	11	0	0	0	0	12	11
3	DF	(Portugal)	Hugo Sousa	14	6	2	0	0	0	16	6
5	DF	(Greece)	Giorgos Delizisis	24	23	6	6	2	1	32	30
8	MF	(Netherlands) / (Cape Verde)	Lerin Duarte	3	1	0	0	0	0	3	1
9	FW	(Greece)	Dimitris Diamantopoulos	6	2	0	0	0	0	6	2
16	FW	(Portugal)	Bruno Gama	34	33	5	5	0	0	39	38
18	MF	(Argentina) / (Portugal)	Nicolás Martínez	23	7	2	0	3	0	28	7
21	DF	(Sweden)	Daniel Sundgren	14	14	1	0	4	4	19	18
23	GK	(Spain)	Julián Cuesta	23	23	6	6	4	4	33	33
24	MF	(Argentina) / (Italy)	Daniel Mancini	25	12	3	1	0	0	28	13
26	MF	(Spain)	Javier Matilla	33	33	6	6	4	4	43	43
28	FW	(Greece)	Giannis Fetfatzidis	32	32	6	6	4	3	42	41
31	DF	(Greece)	Panagiotis Tsagalidis	1	0	0	0	0	0	1	0
38	MF	(Greece)	Petros Bakoutsis	8	5	1	0	0	0	9	5
40	DF	(Greece)	Petros Bagalianis	7	6	0	0	0	0	7	6
88	MF	(Brazil) / (Italy)	Lucas Sasha	34	34	6	6	4	2	44	42
92	DF	(Mauritius) / (France)	Lindsay Rose	34	34	6	6	4	4	44	44
Players who left the club during this season
	MF	(Albania) / (Switzerland)	Migjen Basha	0	0	0	0	4	3	4	3
	FW	(Tunisia)	Hamza Younés	1	0	0	0	1	0	2	0
	FW	(Greece) / (Albania)	Fiorin Durmishaj	6	1	3	0	0	0	9	1
	MF	(France) / (Senegal)	Abou Ba	18	8	3	0	0	0	21	8
	GK	(Greece)	Apostolos Tsilingiris	3	2	0	0	0	0	3	2
	DF	(Spain)	Fran Vélez	24	24	5	5	3	3	32	32
	FW	(France)	Nicolas Diguiny	24	15	4	1	4	4	32	20
	FW	(Sweden)	Daniel Larsson	26	17	6	6	4	2	36	25
	FW	(Nigeria)	Brown Ideye	22	22	5	5	4	4	31	31
	MF	(Argentina)	Martín Tonso	16	3	1	1	4	2	21	6
	DF	(Hungary)	Mihály Korhut	28	28	6	6	4	4	38	38
Total				36		6		4		46	

=== Goals ===
As of match played 19 July 2020

Ranking	Position	Nat.	Player	Super League 1	Greek Cup	UEFA Europa League	Total
1	FW	(Portugal)	Bruno Gama	12	1	0	13
2	FW	(Nigeria)	Brown Ideye	8	2	0	10
3	FW	(France)	Nicolas Diguiny	5	1	2	8
4	FW	(Greece)	Giannis Fetfatzidis	5	0	0	5
4	FW	(Sweden)	Daniel Larsson	4	1	0	5
6	DF	(Spain)	Fran Vélez	4	0	0	4
6	MF	(Brazil) / (Italy)	Lucas Sasha	3	1	0	4
8	DF	(Mauritius) / (France)	Lindsay Rose	3	0	0	3
9	MF	(Spain)	Javier Matilla	1	0	1	2
10	DF	(Hungary)	Mihály Korhut	1	0	0	1
10	MF	(Argentina) / (Portugal)	Nicolás Martínez	1	0	0	1
10	DF	(Greece)	Petros Bagalianis	1	0	0	1
10	MF	(Argentina) / (Italy)	Daniel Mancini	0	1	0	1
10	DF	(Greece)	Giorgos Delizisis	0	0	1	1
Own Goals				0	0	0	0
Total				48	7	4	59

=== Clean sheets ===
As of match played 19 July 2020

#	Nat.	Player	Super League 1	Greek Cup	UEFA Europa League	Total
23	(Spain)	Julián Cuesta	8	3	2	13
1	(Austria)	Fabian Ehmann	2	0	0	2
Total			10	3	2	15

== Players' awards ==
=== NIVEA MEN Best Goal (Super League 1) ===
Matchday	Nat.	Player	Ref
Regular Season
1st	(Brazil) / (Italy)	Lucas Sasha	
9th	(Mauritius) / (France)	Lindsay Rose	
15th	(Nigeria)	Brown Ideye	
22nd	(Portugal)	Bruno Gama	
Play-Off / Play-Out
6th / 7th	(Greece)	Petros Bagalianis	

=== NIVEA MEN Player of the Month (Super League 1) ===
Month	Nat.	Player	Ref
November	(Sweden)	Daniel Larsson	

=== NIVEA MEN Player of the Club ===
Nat.	Player	Ref
(Greece)	Giannis Fetfatzidis	
