= Marquess of Campotéjar =

Spanish noble title

Marquessate of Campotéjar
- Arms of the Marquesses of Campotéjar
- Creation date: 1643
- Created by: Philip IV of Spain
- First holder: Pedro de Granada Venegas
- Present holder: Casilda Finat y Riva
- Status: Extant
- Former seats: Generalife and Casa de los Tiros

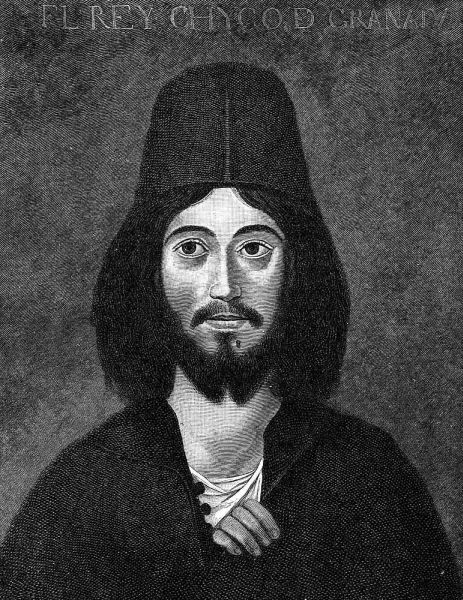
Muhammad XII, a.k.a. Boabdil, last emir of Granada

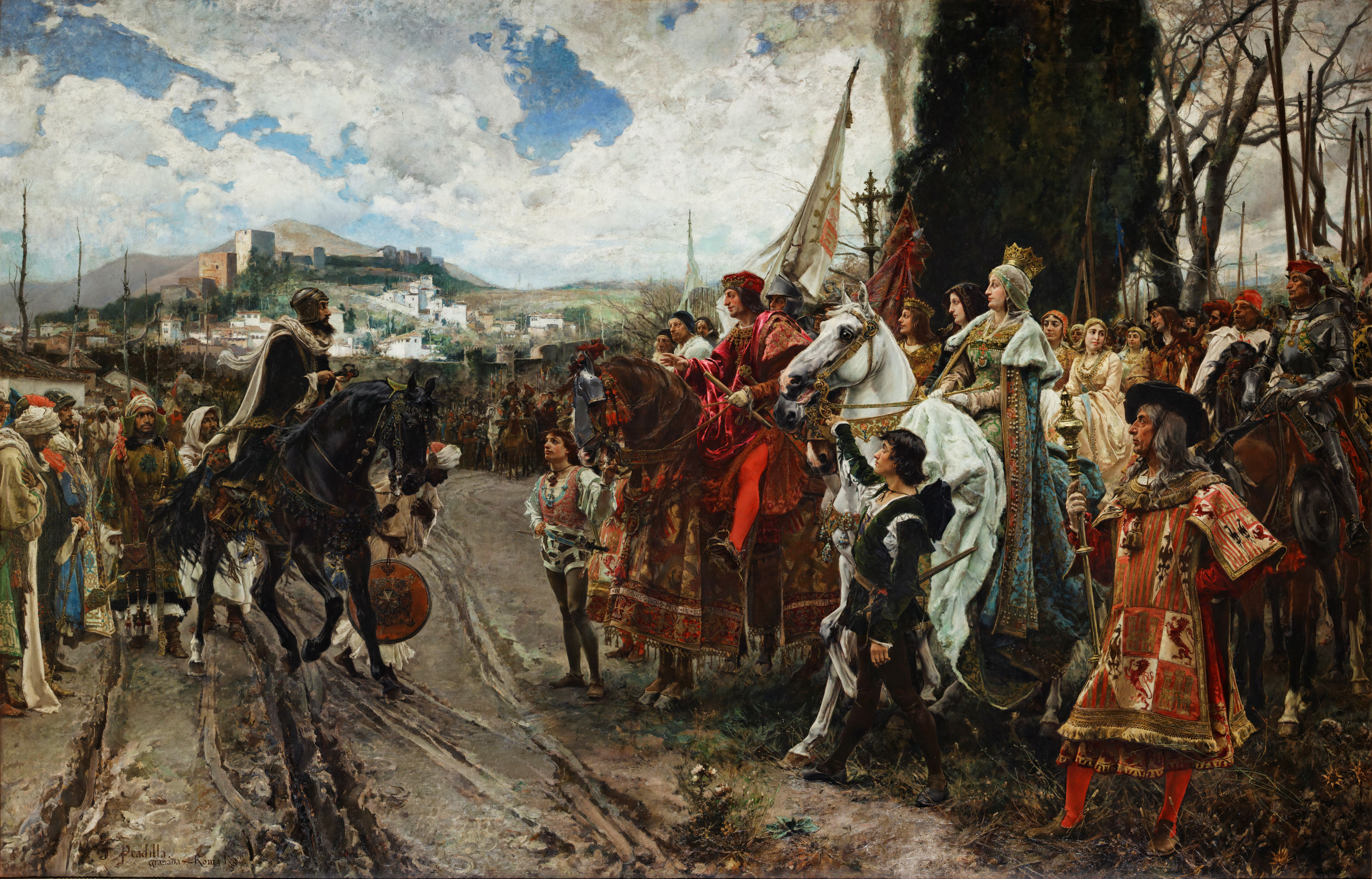
The Surrender of Granada by Francisco Pradilla Ortiz, 1882: Muhammad XII surrenders to Ferdinand and Isabella

The Marquessate of Campotéjar was created by Philip IV of Spain in 1643 for Pedro de Granada y Venegas, son of the second Señor of Campotéjar. The title refers to the village of Campotéjar, in the province of Granada, Spain.

Pedro de Granada, 1st Señor of Campotéjar was of a Morisco family, being the grandson of Yaḥyā Abū Zakariyyā al-Naŷŷar (known as Cidi Yahya) who converted to Christianity and was baptised with the name Pedro de Granada during the general conversion of 1500–1501. Cidi Yahya was himself the grandson of Yusuf IV, Emir of Granada.

The Emirate of Granada fell to the Christians during the Reconquista in 1492. As a reward for his collaboration Pedro de Granada was given numerous grants by the Catholic monarchs. His descendants were embraced and integrated into the Catholic Spanish nobility.

Following the death of the 3rd Marquess in 1660, the title and associated lands including the Generalife and the municipalities of Campotéjar, Jayena and Dehesas Viejas passed to female line descendants, who resided in Genoa, Italy. Spain's attempts to recover the Generalife formed one of the longest judicial processes in Spanish history: it was initiated by Carlos IV of Spain in 1805 and was still in court in 1921.

In 1875 the 17th Marchioness was created a Grandee of Spain. Following the death of the childless 18th Marquess of Campotéjar in 1921 the title did not pass to his nearest heir. The title remained in abeyance until 1951, when a letter of succession was issued in favour of Donna Casilda de Bustos y Figueroa, Duchess of Pastrana, who was unrelated to the previous Marquesses.

== Male line ancestors of the Señores of Campotéjar ==
- Muhammad ibn al-Mawl
- Yusuf IV, Emir of Granada (c.1370-1432)
- Ibn Selim Abraḥem al-Naŷŷar, Wali of Almería (?-aft 1474)
- Yaḥyā Abū Zakariyyā al-Naŷŷar (later Pedro de Granada) (c.1442-1506)
- Ali Omar ibn Nazar (later Alonso de Granada Venegas) (c.1467-1534)

== Señores of Campotéjar ==
- Pedro de Granada Venegas, 1st Señor of Campotéjar (1502-1565)
- Alfonso de Granada Venegas, 2nd Señor of Campotéjar (1540-1611)

== Marquesses of Campotéjar ==
- Pedro de Granada Venegas, 1st Marquess of Campotéjar (1559-1643)
- Fernando de Granada Venegas, 2nd Marquess of Campotéjar (abt 1587-1649)
- Juan de Granada Venegas, 3rd Marquess of Campotéjar (1589-1660)
- Pietro Lomellini Granada, 4th Marquess of Campotéjar (abt 1622-1682)
- David Lomellini Granada, 5th Marquess of Campotéjar (abt 1624-1685)
- Giovanni Battista Lomellini Granada, 6th Marquess of Campotéjar (abt 1626-1708)
- Maria Margarita Provana Granada Venegas Lomellini, 7th Marchioness of Campotéjar (abt 1650-1716)
- Pier Francesco Grimaldi, 8th Marquess of Campotéjar (abt 1645-abt 1724)
- Ansaldo Grimaldi, 9th Marquess of Campotéjar (abt 1670-abt 1748)
- Giovanni Battista Grimaldi, Doge of Genoa, 10th Marquess of Campotéjar (1673-1757)
- Pier Francesco Grimaldi, Doge of Genoa 11th Marquess of Campotéjar (1715-1791)
- Giovanni Battista Grimaldi, 12th Marquess of Campotéjar (?-?)
- Maria Catarina Grimaldi, 13th Marchioness of Campotéjar (abt 1773-1837)
- Maddalena Grimaldi, 14th Marchioness de Campotéjar (1775-1840)
- Ignazio Alessandro Pallavicini, 15th Marquess of Campotéjar (1800-1871)
- Maria Teresa Maddalena Pallavicini, 16th Marchioness of Campotéjar (1829-1914)
- Giacomo Filippo Durazzo Pallavicini, 17th Marquess of Campotéjar (1848-1921)

In 1926, following the death of the 17th Marquess and the Spanish recovery of the Generalife, his widow was granted the Marquessate of the Generalife in her own right:

- Matilde Giustiniani, Marchioness of the Generalife (1878-1970)

The Marquessate of Campotéjar was revived in 1951, though the grantee was unrelated to the previous Marquesses:

- Casilda de Bustos y Figueroa, 15th Duchess of Pastrana, 18th Marchioness of Campotéjar (1910-2000)
- José Maria Finat y Bustos, 16th Duke of Pastrana, 19th Marquess of Campotéjar (b.1932)
- Casilda Finat y Riva, 20th Marchioness of Campotéjar (b.1964)
