= Manssour Fofana =

Ivorian association football player

Personal information
- Full name: Mohamed Manssour Fofana
- Date of birth: 10 July 2002 (age 24)
- Place of birth: Abobo, Ivory Coast
- Height: 1.75 m (5 ft 9 in)
- Position: Winger

Team information
- Current team: PAS Pyrgos
- Number: 17

Youth career
- –2021: ASD Cannara

Senior career*
Years	Team	Apps	(Gls)
2020–2021	ASD Cannara	10	(1)
2021–2022	Veria	31	(6)
2022–2023	PAS Giannina	5	(1)
2023–2024	Tilikratis	9	(1)
2024–2026	Egaleo	33	(1)
2026	KF Teuta	5	(0)
2026–	PAS Pyrgos	3	(0)
- * Club domestic league appearances and goals as of 27 September 2026

Mohamed Manssour Fofana (born 10 July 2002) is an Ivorian professional footballer who plays as a midfielder for Super League Greece 2 club PAS Pyrgos.

== Club career ==
Born in Abobo, Fofana began his career with Italian amateur club ASD Cannara. At the age of 19, he joined Veria on a 3-year contract, signing his first professional contract.

He made his debut on 21 November 2021 against Olympiacos Volos and he scored his first goal against AEL in a 1–1 away game draw.

In August 2022 he moved to PAS Giannina.

== Career statistics ==
As of 17 July 2023

Club	Season	League			Cup		Continental		Super Cup		Total	
Club	Season	Division	Apps	Goals	Apps	Goals	Apps	Goals	Apps	Goals	Apps	Goals
ASD Cannara	2020–21	Serie D	10	1	—		—		—		10	1
Veria	2021–22	Superleague Greece 2	31	6	1	0	—		—		32	6
PAS Giannina	2022–23	Superleague Greece	5	1	1	0	—		—		6	1
Career total			46	8	2	0	0	0	0	0	48	8
