= Bruno Gama =

Portuguese footballer (born 1987)

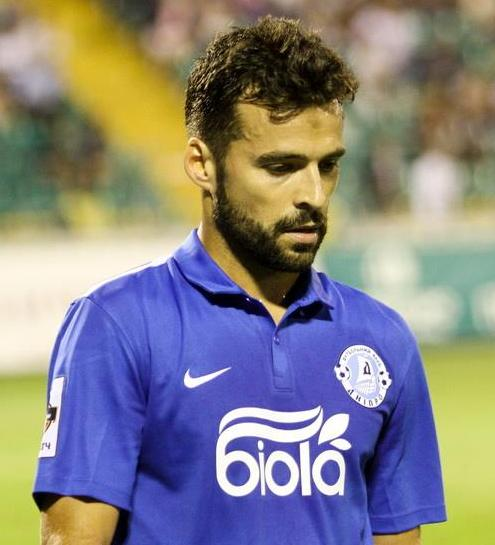
- Gama with Dnipro in 2015

Personal information
- Full name: Bruno Alexandre Vilela Gama
- Date of birth: 15 November 1987 (age 38)
- Place of birth: Vila Verde, Portugal
- Height: 1.75 m (5 ft 9 in)
- Position: Winger

Youth career
- 1998–2004: Braga
- 2000–2001: → Bairro Misericórdia (loan)

Senior career*
Years	Team	Apps	(Gls)
2004	Braga	1	(0)
2004–2006	Porto B	45	(6)
2005–2009	Porto	1	(0)
2006–2007	→ Braga (loan)	15	(0)
2007–2009	→ Vitória Setúbal (loan)	53	(6)
2009–2011	Rio Ave	59	(5)
2011–2013	Deportivo La Coruña	68	(13)
2013–2016	Dnipro	56	(9)
2016–2018	Deportivo La Coruña	28	(0)
2018	Alcorcón	15	(1)
2018–2022	Aris	108	(24)
2022–2025	AEK Larnaca	50	(5)
2025–2026	Kalamata	15	(0)

International career
2002	Portugal U16	7	(0)
2003–2004	Portugal U17	34	(11)
2004–2005	Portugal U18	6	(2)
2005–2006	Portugal U19	17	(9)
2006–2007	Portugal U20	14	(6)
2008–2009	Portugal U21	5	(0)
2009–2010	Portugal U23	2	(1)
Medal record
Men's football
Representing Portugal
UEFA European U17 Championship
Winner	2003 Portugal
- * Club domestic league appearances and goals as of 04:26, 8 November 2026 (UTC)

Bruno Alexandre Vilela Gama (born 15 November 1987) is a Portuguese professional footballer who plays as a right winger.

He amassed Primeira Liga totals of 129 matches and 11 goals over seven seasons, mainly representing Vitória de Setúbal and Rio Ave (two years apiece). Abroad, he played with Deportivo, Dnipro, Alcorcón, Aris and AEK Larnaca.

Gama won 83 caps for Portugal all youth levels comprised, scoring 28 goals.

== Club career ==
=== Portugal ===
Gama was born in Vila Verde, Braga District. A S.C. Braga youth graduate, he appeared aged 16 in his first Primeira Liga game, a 2–2 away draw against U.D. Leiria, being subsequently acquired by FC Porto in a €750,000 deal.

After spending most of his first seasons with the club's B side, Gama served another two top-division loans, at Braga in 2006–07– scoring in a 4–0 home win over FC Slovan Liberec in the group stage of the UEFA Cup– and Vitória de Setúbal the following two years.

In mid-July 2009, Gama was released by Porto and joined Rio Ave F.C. on a two-year contract. During his first season in Vila do Conde he was one of the few players to play all 30 league matches, contributing to a final 12th place in the top tier; he scored in home defeats of former side Setúbal (1–0) and Leixões SC (2–0).

=== Deportivo ===
As many compatriots during that timeframe, Gama signed for Spain's Deportivo de La Coruña on 27 July 2011, for an undisclosed fee. He contributed 29 games and seven goals in his first year, to help the Galicians win the Segunda División championship.

Gama made his debut in La Liga on 20 August 2012, playing the full 90 minutes in a 2–0 home victory over CA Osasuna.

=== Dnipro ===
On 20 August 2013, following Deportivo's relegation, Gama moved teams and countries again, joining FC Dnipro on a three-year contract. On 13 September of the following year, he scored a hat-trick in a 5–2 win at FC Metalist Kharkiv.

Gama made 16 appearances – all rounds included – to help his team to reach the final of the 2015 Europa League against Sevilla FC, being an unused substitute in the 3–2 loss in Warsaw.

=== Alcorcón ===
On 17 February 2018, after a further two top-flight seasons with Deportivo, the free agent Gama signed a short-term deal with AD Alcorcón. He scored his only goal for the latter on 3 June, helping the hosts defeat CF Reus Deportiu 3–0.

=== Aris ===
On 10 August 2018, Gama joined Aris Thessaloniki F.C. on a two-year contract for an undisclosed fee. Seventeen days later, in his Super League Greece debut, he scored in a 3–0 away win against PAS Lamia 1964.

Gama netted a career-best 12 goals in his second season, as the team came fifth and qualified for the Europa League; this included a brace on 6 June 2020 in a 3–1 home victory over OFI Crete FC. He subsequently extended his contract for two more years.

On 6 March 2022, in his 100th league appearance for the club, Gama closed the 2–1 defeat of Olympiacos F.C. at the Kleanthis Vikelidis Stadium, breaking the champions' undefeated streak after 25 games.

== International career ==
Internationally, Gama first participated in the 2003 UEFA European Under-17 Championship, as Portugal emerged victorious on home soil. He also helped the team reach the quarter-finals in that year's FIFA World Cup held in Finland, scoring one goal against Cameroon.

Gama captained Portugal in the 2004 European Under-17 Championship, being crowned top scorer after netting three in five appearances and being essential as the national side took third place. In 2006 he appeared with the under-19s at the Under-19 European Championship, scoring in every game in the group stage.

Gama was part of the squad that took part in the 2007 FIFA U-20 World Cup, scoring two goals in the country's only win in the tournament – one from a free kick and the other from the penalty spot in a 2–0 win against New Zealand. In the ensuing Autumn he was called up to the under-21s and, in 2010, he played with the Olympic team in the 2009–11 International Challenge Trophy.

== Personal life ==
Gama's older brother, Augusto, was also a footballer. He too represented Braga and Rio Ave.

== Career statistics ==
As of 22 May 2022

Club	Season	League			National cup		League cup		Europe		Total	
Club	Season	Division	Apps	Goals	Apps	Goals	Apps	Goals	Apps	Goals	Apps	Goals
Braga	2003–04	Primeira Liga	1	0	0	0	—		—		1	0
Porto	2004–05	Primeira Liga	1	0	0	0	—		0	0	1	0
Porto B	2004–05	Segunda Divisão	23	3	—		—		—		23	3
Porto B	2005–06	Segunda Divisão	22	3	—		—		—		22	3
Porto B	Total		45	6	—		—		—		45	6
Braga	2006–07	Primeira Liga	15	0	3	0	—		3	1	21	1
Vitória Setúbal	2007–08	Primeira Liga	24	4	5	0	5	0	—		34	4
Vitória Setúbal	2008–09	Primeira Liga	29	2	3	2	2	0	2	1	36	5
Vitória Setúbal	Total		53	6	8	2	7	0	2	1	70	9
Rio Ave	2009–10	Primeira Liga	30	3	5	0	5	1	—		40	3
Rio Ave	2010–11	Primeira Liga	29	2	4	2	2	0	—		35	4
Rio Ave	Total		59	5	9	2	7	1	—		75	7
Deportivo	2011–12	Segunda División	29	7	0	0	—		—		29	7
Deportivo	2012–13	La Liga	38	6	2	0	—		—		40	6
Deportivo	2013–14	Segunda División	1	0	0	0	—		—		1	0
Deportivo	Total		68	13	2	0	—		—		70	13
Dnipro	2013–14	Ukrainian Premier League	10	3	1	0	—		6	0	17	3
Dnipro	2014–15	Ukrainian Premier League	23	5	4	0	—		18^{[B]}	0	45	5
Dnipro	2015–16	Ukrainian Premier League	23	1	6	2	—		6	1	35	4
Dnipro	Total		56	9	11	2	—		30	1	97	12
Deportivo	2016–17	La Liga	22	0	2	1	—		—		24	1
Deportivo	2017–18	La Liga	6	0	1	0	—		—		7	0
Deportivo	Total		28	0	3	1	—		—		31	1
Alcorcón	2017–18	Segunda División	15	1	0	0	—		—		15	1
Aris	2018–19	Super League Greece	14	2	2	0	—		—		16	2
Aris	2019–20	Super League Greece	34	12	5	1	—		—		39	13
Aris	2020–21	Super League Greece	33	5	3	1	—		1	1	37	7
Aris	2021–22	Super League Greece	27	5	4	2	—		2	0	33	7
Aris	Total		108	24	14	4	—		3	1	125	29
Career total			449	64	50	13	14	1	38	4	551	80

== Honours ==
Vitória Setúbal

- Taça da Liga: 2007–08

Deportivo

- Segunda División: 2011–12

Dnipro

- UEFA Europa League runner-up: 2014–15

AEK Larnaca

- Cypriot Cup: 2024–25

Portugal U17

- UEFA European Under-17 Championship: 2003

Individual

- UEFA European Under-17 Championship top scorer: 2004 (3 goals)
