= Julián Cuesta =

Spanish footballer

Julián
Personal information
- Full name: Julián Cuesta Díaz
- Date of birth: 28 March 1991 (age 35)
- Place of birth: Campotéjar, Spain
- Height: 1.95 m (6 ft 5 in)
- Position: Goalkeeper

Team information
- Current team: Antalyaspor
- Number: 1

Youth career
- Sevilla

Senior career*
Years	Team	Apps	(Gls)
2010–2013	Sevilla B	54	(0)
2013–2014	Sevilla	1	(0)
2014	→ Almería (loan)	0	(0)
2014–2017	Almería	22	(0)
2017–2018	Wisła Kraków	20	(0)
2018–2025	Aris	188	(0)
2025–	Antalyaspor	20	(0)
- * Club domestic league appearances and goals as of 23:00, 3 May 2026 (UTC)

Julián Cuesta Díaz (born 28 March 1991), known simply as Julián, is a Spanish professional footballer who plays as a goalkeeper for Süper Lig club Antalyaspor.

== Club career ==
=== Sevilla ===
Julián was born in Campotéjar, Province of Granada, Andalusia. He played youth football with Sevilla FC, spending several of his first seasons as a senior with the reserves in the Segunda División B.

On 26 January 2013, as both players who split first-choice status in the first team, Diego López and Andrés Palop, were unavailable (the former had been sold to Real Madrid shortly before, the latter was injured), Julián was promoted to the main squad. He made his La Liga debut two days later, keeping a clean sheet in a 3–0 home win against Granada CF.

=== Almería ===
On 21 January 2014, Julián was loaned to fellow top-flight side UD Almería until the end of the campaign. He signed on a permanent basis on 13 June, after agreeing to a three-year deal.

Julián made his debut for the Rojiblancos on 5 December 2014, starting in a 4–3 away win over Real Betis in the round of 32 of the Copa del Rey. After starter Rubén went down with an injury he became the starter, notably saving a penalty kick in a 1–0 victory at RC Celta de Vigo.

=== Wisła Kraków ===
On 22 June 2017, Julián signed a one-year contract with Polish club Wisła Kraków. His maiden appearance in the Ekstraklasa occurred on 14 July, in a 2–1 away defeat of Pogoń Szczecin.

=== Aris ===
On 11 July 2018, Aris Thessaloniki F.C. announced the signing of Julián on a two-year deal. On 6 March 2019, as a reward for his solid performances, he extended his link until the summer of 2021.

Cuesta agreed to further renewals at the Kleanthis Vikelidis Stadium in July 2020 and May 2022.

== Career statistics ==
As of match played on 3 May 2026

Appearances and goals by club, season and competition
Club	Season	League			National cup (Note: Includes Copa del Rey, Greek Cup)		Europe		Other		Total	
Club	Season	Division	Apps	Goals	Apps	Goals	Apps	Goals	Apps	Goals	Apps	Goals
Sevilla B	2010–11	Segunda División B	11	0	—		—		—		11	0
Sevilla B	2011–12	Segunda División B	17	0	—		—		—		17	0
Sevilla B	2012–13	Segunda División B	26	0	—		—		—		26	0
Sevilla B	Total		54	0	—		—		—		54	0
Sevilla	2011–12	La Liga	0	0	0	0	—		—		0	0
Sevilla	2012–13	La Liga	1	0	0	0	—		—		1	0
Sevilla	2013–14	La Liga	0	0	0	0	0	0	—		0	0
Sevilla	Total		1	0	0	0	0	0	—		1	0
Almería	2013–14	La Liga	0	0	0	0	—		—		0	0
Almería	2014–15	La Liga	15	0	4	0	—		—		19	0
Almería	2015–16	Segunda División	6	0	4	0	—		—		10	0
Almería	2016–17	Segunda División	1	0	1	0	—		—		2	0
Almería	Total		22	0	9	0	—		—		31	0
Wisła Kraków	2017–18	Ekstraklasa	20	0	0	0	—		—		20	0
Aris Thessaloniki	2018–19	Super League Greece	30	0	1	0	—		—		31	0
Aris Thessaloniki	2019–20	Super League Greece	23	0	6	0	4 (Note: Appearances in UEFA Europa League)	0	—		33	0
Aris Thessaloniki	2020–21	Super League Greece	18	0	3	0	1	0	—		22	0
Aris Thessaloniki	2021–22	Super League Greece	27	0	2	0	0	0	—		29	0
Aris Thessaloniki	2022–23	Super League Greece	31	0	3	0	4 (Note: Appearances in UEFA Europa Conference League)	0	—		38	0
Aris Thessaloniki	2023–24	Super League Greece	29	0	6	0	3	0	—		38	0
Aris Thessaloniki	2024–25	Super League Greece	30	0	2	0	—		—		32	0
Aris Thessaloniki	Total		188	0	23	0	12	0	—		223	0
Antalyaspor	2025–26	Süper Lig	20	0	1	0	—		—		21	0
Career total			305	0	33	0	12	0	0	0	350	0
