= Rubén García (footballer, born 1998) =

Spanish footballer

Personal information
- Full name: Rubén García Canales
- Date of birth: 20 October 1998 (age 28)
- Place of birth: Elche, Spain
- Height: 1.80 m (5 ft 11 in)
- Position: Right back

Team information
- Current team: Orihuela
- Number: 24

Youth career
- Elche
- 2015–2016: Barcelona
- 2016–2017: Elche

Senior career*
Years	Team	Apps	(Gls)
2015	Elche B	1	(0)
2016–2018	Elche B	32	(0)
2018–2019	Castellón	23	(0)
2019–2020	Levante B	22	(0)
2020–2025	Asteras Tripolis	73	(0)
2025–	Orihuela	27	(0)
- * Club domestic league appearances and goals as of 16 May 2026

Rubén García Canales (born 20 October 1998) is a Spanish professional footballer who plays for Orihuela as a right back.

== Club career ==
García was born in Elche, Alicante, Valencian Community, and was an Elche CF youth graduate. He made his senior debut with the reserves on 1 March 2015, starting in a 0–0 Segunda División B home draw against UE Olot.

In 2015, García moved to FC Barcelona and returned to the youth setup. He subsequently returned to the Franjiverdes in the following year, and was definitely promoted to the B-side ahead of the 2017–18 campaign.

On 5 August 2018, García signed for third division side CD Castellón. The following 4 July, he terminated his contract with the club, and agreed to a two-year deal with Atlético Levante UD four days later.

On 31 August 2020, García moved abroad and joined Super League Greece side Asteras Tripolis FC. He made his professional debut on 13 September, coming on as a late substitute for Xesc Regis in a 1–0 home win against Panathinaikos FC.
