= Panagiotis Tsintotas =

Greek footballer

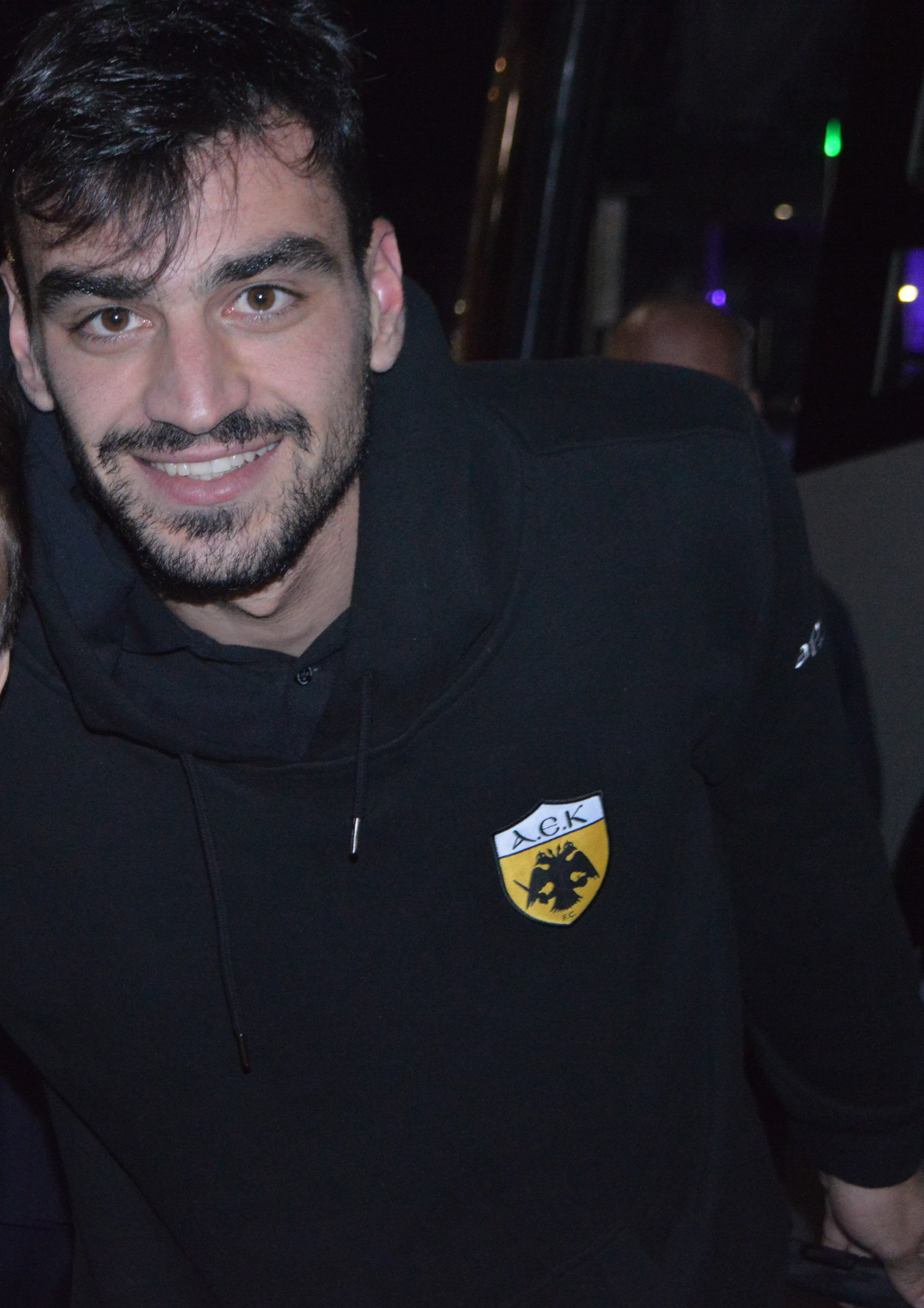
- Tsintotas with AEK Athens in 2018

Personal information
- Full name: Panagiotis Tsintotas
- Date of birth: 4 July 1993 (age 33)
- Place of birth: Katerini, Greece
- Height: 1.94 m (6 ft 4 in)
- Position: Goalkeeper

Team information
- Current team: Iraklis
- Number: 16

Youth career
- 2011: Pierikos

Senior career*
Years	Team	Apps	(Gls)
2011–2012	Pierikos	5	(0)
2012–2017	Levadiakos	18	(0)
2017–2022	AEK Athens	58	(0)
2023	PAS Giannina	15	(0)
2023–2024	Atromitos	26	(0)
2024–2026	Asteras Tripolis	19	(0)
2026–	Iraklis	0	(0)

International career
2012	Greece U19	2	(0)
- * Club domestic league appearances and goals as of 1 June 2026

Panagiotis Tsintotas (Greek: Παναγιώτης Τσιντώτας; born 4 July 1993) is a Greek professional footballer who plays as a goalkeeper for Super League club Iraklis.

== Career ==
=== Levadiakos ===
On January transfer window of 2012, he joined Levadiakos from Football League club Pierikos. On 26 April 2015, he made his debut for the first team in a home game against Atromitos.

=== AEK Athens ===
On 24 June 2017, Tsintotas joined AEK Athens from the Super League on a three-year contract. On 1 October 2017 he made his Super League debut in a 2–0 away defeat against Asteras Tripolis. On 7 December 2017, he made his international debut, playing with the club as a starter in a 0–0 away UEFA Europa League game against Austria Wien helping AEK to secure point needed to join Milan in round of last 32 in Europa League.

According to various sources, AEK’s goalie, Tsintotas, is expected to be in Michael Skibbe’s call-ups for Greece’s upcoming friendlies in March. He has been exceptional for AEK since taking over as the club’s new #1 after Giannis Anestis’ relations with the club took a wrong turn, leaving him sidelined since January. Michael Skibbe is expected to call-up Tsintotas for Greece's upcoming friendlies in March against Switzerland and Egypt as the national team prepares for the UEFA Nations League, which kicks off in September.

On 29 August 2018, Tsintotas agreed to a contract extension with AEK, until the summer of 2023. In November 2022 his contract with the club was terminated.

=== PAS Giannina ===
On 27 November 2022, he signed for PAS Giannina in Super League until the end of the season.

=== Atromitos ===
On 24 June 2023, Tsintotas agreed to join Atromitos on a 1+1 year deal.

== Career statistics ==
=== Club ===
As of 5 July 2026

Club	Season	League			Cup		Continental		Other		Total	
Club	Season	Division	Apps	Goals	Apps	Goals	Apps	Goals	Apps	Goals	Apps	Goals
Pierikos	2011–12	Super League Greece 2	5	0	0	0	—		—		5	0
Levadiakos	2014–15	Superleague Greece	1	0	1	0	—		—		2	0
Levadiakos	2015–16	Superleague Greece	17	0	2	0	—		—		19	0
Levadiakos	2016–17	Superleague Greece	0	0	0	0	—		—		0	0
Levadiakos	Total		18	0	3	0	—		—		21	0
AEK Athens	2017–18	Superleague Greece	15	0	2	0	1	0	—		18	0
AEK Athens	2018–19	Superleague Greece	4	0	5	0	0	0	—		9	0
AEK Athens	2019–20	Superleague Greece	9	0	6	0	0	0	—		15	0
AEK Athens	2020–21	Superleague Greece	17	0	5	0	7	0	—		29	0
AEK Athens	2021–22	Superleague Greece	13	0	4	0	1	0	—		18	0
AEK Athens	Total		58	0	22	0	9	0	—		89	0
PAS Giannina	2022–23	Superleague Greece	15	0	0	0	—		—		15	0
Atromitos	2023–24	Superleague Greece	26	0	2	0	—		—		28	0
Asteras Tripolis	2024–25	Superleague Greece	17	0	2	0	—		—		19	0
Asteras Tripolis	2025–26	Superleague Greece	2	0	1	0	—		—		3	0
Asteras Tripolis	Total		19	0	3	0	—		—		22	0
Career total			141	0	30	0	9	0	0	0	180	0

== Honours ==
AEK Athens

- Super League: 2017–18
