= Angelos Tsavos =

Greek footballer

Personal information
- Date of birth: 11 April 2002 (age 24)
- Place of birth: Athens, Greece
- Height: 1.81 m (5 ft 11 in)
- Position: Right-back

Youth career
- Olympiacos

Senior career*
| Years | Team | Apps | (Gls) |
| 2021–2022 | Episkopi | 29 | (1) |
| 2022–2023 | PAS Giannina | 3 | (0) |
| 2023–2024 | Diagoras | 19 | (0) |
| 2024–2025 | Doxa Katokopias | 16 | (0) |

International career^{‡}
| 2022 | Greece U21 | 1 | (0) |
- * Club domestic league appearances and goals as of 26 June 2025 ‡ National team caps and goals as of 23 September 2022

Angelos Tsavos (Greek: Άγγελος Τσάβος; born 11 April 2002) is a Greek professional footballer who plays as a right-back.

== Career ==
In summer 2022 he signed a three-year contract with PAS Giannina.

== Career statistics ==
As of 17 July 2023

| Club | Season | League | | | Cup | | Continental | | Super Cup | | Total | |
| Club | Season | Division | Apps | Goals | Apps | Goals | Apps | Goals | Apps | Goals | Apps | Goals |
|---|---|---|---|---|---|---|---|---|---|---|---|---|
| Episkopi | 2021–22 | Superleague Greece 2 | 29 | 1 | 0 | 0 | — | | — | | 29 | 1 |
| PAS Giannina | 2022–23 | Superleague Greece | 3 | 0 | 0 | 0 | — | | — | | 3 | 0 |
| Career total | | | 32 | 1 | 0 | 0 | 0 | 0 | 0 | 0 | 32 | 1 |
