= Lucas Sasha =

Brazilian footballer

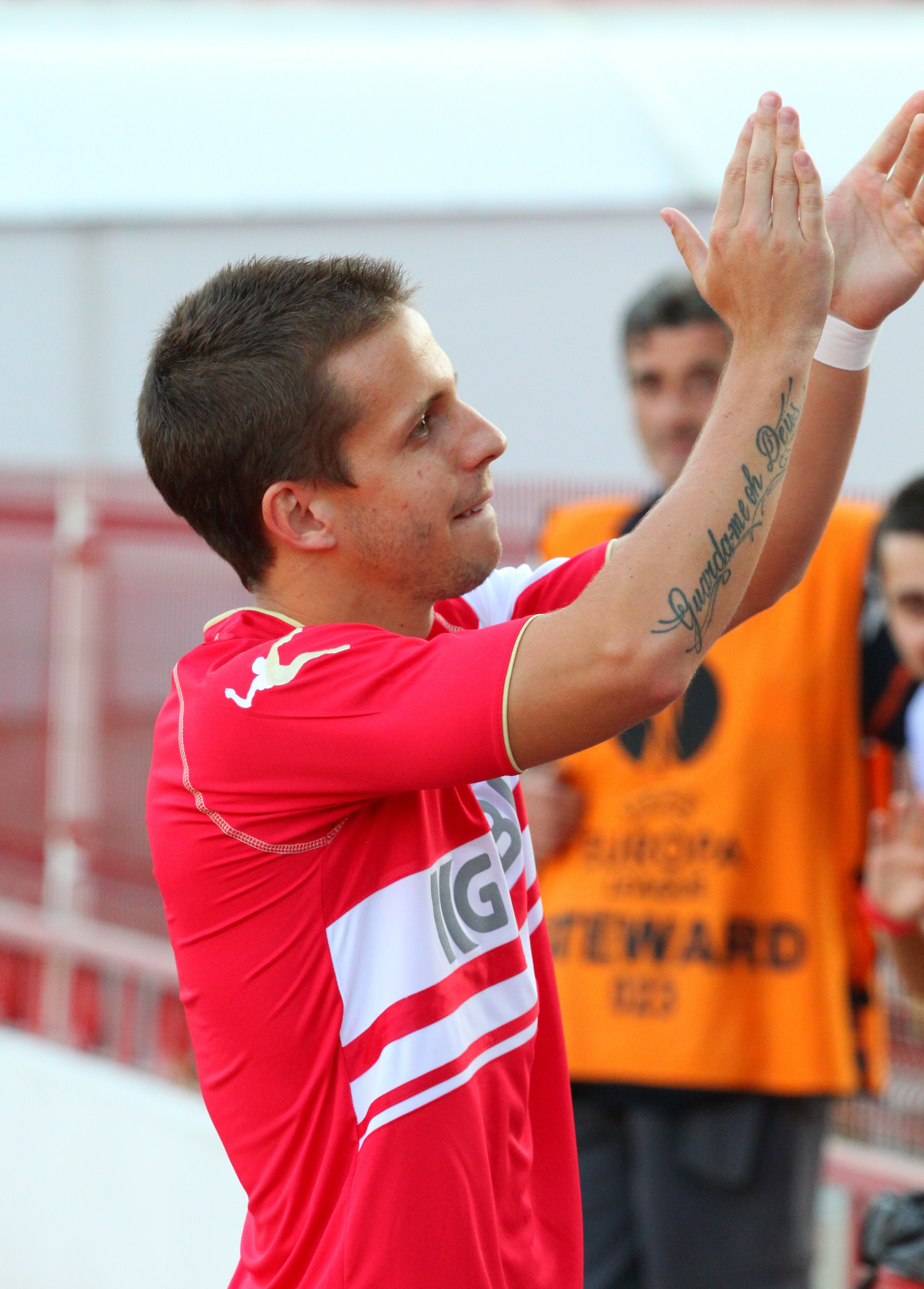
- Sasha with CSKA Sofia in 2012

Personal information
- Full name: Lucas Pacheco Affini
- Date of birth: 1 March 1990 (age 36)
- Place of birth: São Paulo, Brazil
- Height: 1.77 m (5 ft 10 in)
- Position: Defensive midfielder

Team information
- Current team: Fortaleza
- Number: 88

Youth career
- Corinthians

Senior career*
Years	Team	Apps	(Gls)
2009–2010	Grêmio Barueri	13	(0)
2011	Catanzaro	1	(0)
2012	São José	0	(0)
2012–2013	CSKA Sofia	29	(2)
2013–2015	Hapoel Tel Aviv	59	(7)
2015–2019	Ludogorets Razgrad II	9	(4)
2015–2019	Ludogorets Razgrad	92	(2)
2019–2022	Aris	117	(9)
2022–	Fortaleza	188	(6)
- * Club domestic league appearances and goals as of 15 August 2026

Lucas Pacheco Affini (born 1 March 1990), commonly known as Lucas Sasha, is a Brazilian professional footballer who plays as a defensive midfielder for Fortaleza.

== Career ==
Lucas Sasha began his youth career with Corinthians. He was part of the side that won the youth cup – Copa São Paulo de Juniores in 2009. In the same year he moved to Grêmio Barueri.

In 2010, he made his professional debut for Grêmio and played in 16 matches through the season. He competed in three matches for the club during Campeonato Paulista (from January to May). In the second part of the season, he participated in 13 matches in Série A. The team finished 20th in the league and was relegated.

In January 2011, he went on trial to West Ham United. Later he moved to the Italian Catanzaro 1929.

In early 2012 he joined São José and played in Campeonato Paulista Série A2. He played in 10 matches for the club. During the summer of 2012, Sasha passed trial in CSKA Sofia and signed as a free agent with the club. Lucas debuted for CSKA in the second qualifying round of UEFA Europa League, coming on as substitute for Kosta Yanev in a match against Mura 05. He scored his first goal as a CSKA player in A Group against Slavia Sofia. On 31 October he made assist for the equalizing goal and scored the second against Ludogorets Razgrad in a 2–1 win at Ludogorets Arena for the Bulgarian Cup. On 6 April 2013, Sasha netted the winning goal for CSKA against Botev Vratsa as the match finished 4–3 at Hristo Botev Stadium. During the summer of 2013 CSKA experienced a management and financial crisis, causing Lucas to start looking for a new club.

On 4 July 2013, Sasha signed a two-year contract with Hapoel Tel Aviv after a short trial. On 18 July, he marked his debut by scoring a goal and providing an assist in the 4–1 away win over Beroe in the first leg of a UEFA Europa League preliminary round match. He returned to Bulgaria, joining reigning champions Ludogorets Razgrad in the summer of 2015.

On 10 July 2019, he moved to the Super League Greece, signing a two-year contract with Aris. On 24 August 2019, he scored his first goal for the club, in a 1–1 home draw against OFI. On 10 November 2019, he scored with a beautiful header helping to a 2–1 home win against Asteras Tripolis.

On 4 January 2020, he scored with a perfect shot, after an assist from Giannis Fetfatzidis, to seal a triumphant 4–2 home win against PAOK, at the Derby of Thessaloniki. Ten days later, he helped with a goal to a 2–1 home win against Xanthi, as his team qualified for the quarter-finals of the Greek Cup.

In June 2020, Sasha is likely to extend his contract, as everyone in the team has been impressed by his consistency and professionalism.

His first goal for the 2020–21 season came in a 2–2 away draw against Atromitos, on 5 December 2020. In the first game of 2021, Sasha opened the score in a 2–0 home win against Volos.

On 22 March 2021, Sasha signed a new three-year contract, which will keep at the Kleanthis Vikelidis Stadium, until the summer of 2024.

== Career statistics ==
As of 2 June 2022

Club	Season	League			Cup		Continental		Other		Total	
Club	Season	Division	Apps	Goals	Apps	Goals	Apps	Goals	Apps	Goals	Apps	Goals
CSKA Sofia	2012–13	Group A	29	2	1	0	2	0	—		32	2
Hapoel Tel Aviv	2013–14	Israeli Premier League	34	4	0	0	4	2	1	1	39	7
Hapoel Tel Aviv	2014–15	Israeli Premier League	25	3	5	0	2	1	0	0	32	4
Hapoel Tel Aviv	Total		59	7	5	0	6	3	1	1	71	11
Ludogorets Razgrad	2015–16	Group A	22	0	0	0	1	0	1	0	24	0
Ludogorets Razgrad	2016–17	First League	25	1	4	1	7	0	0	0	36	2
Ludogorets Razgrad	2017–18	First League	27	0	2	0	11	0	0	0	40	0
Ludogorets Razgrad	2018–19	First League	18	1	2	0	7	0	0	0	27	1
Ludogorets Razgrad	Total		92	2	8	1	26	0	1	0	127	3
Aris	2019–20	Super League Greece	34	3	6	1	4	0	—		44	4
Aris	2020–21	Super League Greece	35	3	4	0	1	0	—		40	3
Aris	2021–22	Super League Greece	30	2	4	0	2	1	—		36	3
Aris	Total		99	8	14	1	7	1	—		120	10
Career total			279	19	28	2	41	4	2	1	350	26

== Honours ==
Corinthians Paulista

- Copa São Paulo de Juniores: 2009

Ludogorets Razgrad

- Bulgarian First League: 2015–16, 2016–17, 2017–18, 2018–19
- Bulgarian Supercup: 2018

Fortaleza

- Campeonato Cearense: 2023, 2026
- Copa do Nordeste: 2024
