= Apostolos Tsilingiris =

Greek footballer

Personal information
- Date of birth: 6 September 2000 (age 26)
- Place of birth: Xanthi, Greece
- Height: 1.88 m (6 ft 2 in)
- Position: Goalkeeper

Team information
- Current team: Levadiakos
- Number: 75

Youth career
- 2007–2015: Xanthi
- 2015–2017: Kessani Erasmiou

Senior career*
Years	Team	Apps	(Gls)
2017–2018	Orfeas Xanthi	1	(0)
2018–2019	Irodotos	7	(0)
2019–2020	Aris	3	(0)
2020–2023	APOEL	0	(0)
2023	Panserraikos	0	(0)
2024	Iraklis	1	(0)
2024–2025	Diagoras	24	(0)
2025	Ilioupoli	0	(0)
2025–2026	A.E. Kifisia	1	(0)
2026–	Levadiakos	0	(0)
- * Club domestic league appearances and goals as of 14 June 2026

Apostolos Tsilingiris (Greek: Απόστολος Τσιλιγγίρης; born 6 September 2000) is a Greek professional footballer who plays as a goalkeeper for Super League club Levadiakos.

== Career ==
=== Aris ===
On 29 August 2019, the 19-year-old Tsilingiris signed a one-year contract with Aris.

On 10 November 2019, he made his debut with the club as a substitution, against Asteras Tripolis in a season game, when the starter goalkeeper Fabian Ehmann sent off. On 24 November 2019, the teenage goalkeeper was gifted his full debut in the Super League against AEK Athens. Despite the occasion, Tsilingiris produced a near flawless performance, only being beaten by Petros Mantalos from the penalty spot as the match ended 1–1 and he named as the Man of the match.

== Career statistics ==
=== Club ===
As of 1 December 2019

Club	Season	League			Cup		Continental		Other		Total	
Club	Season	Division	Apps	Goals	Apps	Goals	Apps	Goals	Apps	Goals	Apps	Goals
Irodotos	2018–19	Super League Greece 2	7	0	1	0	—		—		8	0
Aris	2019–20	Super League Greece	3	0	0	0	—		—		3	0
Career total			10	0	1	0	0	0	0	0	11	0
