= Claudiu Bălan =

Romanian footballer (born 1994)

Personal information
- Full name: Claudiu Cristian Bălan
- Date of birth: 22 June 1994 (age 32)
- Place of birth: Craiova, Romania
- Height: 1.86 m (6 ft 1 in)
- Position: Forward

Team information
- Current team: Unirea Alba Iulia
- Number: 9

Youth career
- 2004–2013: Universitatea Craiova

Senior career*
Years	Team	Apps	(Gls)
2013–2014	FC U Craiova	18	(2)
2014–2015	Mioveni	8	(2)
2015	Olt Slatina		
2016	CS Podari		
2017	Filiași		
2017–2022	FC U Craiova	87	(49)
2022–2024	PAS Giannina	47	(7)
2024–2025	FC U Craiova	21	(4)
2025–2026	Concordia Chiajna	17	(3)
2026–	Unirea Alba Iulia	0	(0)
- * Club domestic league appearances and goals as of 9 May 2026

Claudiu Cristian Bălan (born 22 June 1994) is a Romanian professional footballer who plays as a forward for Liga III club Unirea Alba Iulia.

== Club career ==
On 13 September 2022, Bălan transferred to PAS Giannina.

== Honours ==
FC U Craiova

- Liga II: 2020–21
- Liga III: 2019–20
- Liga IV: 2017–18
