= Iker Bilbao =

Spanish footballer

Personal information
- Full name: Iker Bilbao Mendiguren
- Date of birth: 20 March 1996 (age 30)
- Place of birth: Larrabetzu, Spain
- Height: 1.81 m (5 ft 11 in)
- Position: Midfielder

Team information
- Current team: TransINVEST
- Number: 6

Youth career
- Danok Bat

Senior career*
Years	Team	Apps	(Gls)
2015–2018	Basconia	54	(3)
2017–2018	→ Gernika (loan)	15	(0)
2018–2022	Amorebieta	110	(9)
2022–2024	PAS Giannina	18	(0)
2024	Alcorcón	6	(0)
2024–2025	Real Unión	33	(1)
2026–	TransINVEST	20	(0)
- * Club domestic league appearances and goals as of 13 July 2026

Iker Bilbao Mendiguren (born 20 March 1996) is a Spanish professional footballer who plays as a midfielder for Lithuanian A Lyga club TransINVEST.

== Career ==
Bilbao was born in Larrabetzu, Biscay, Basque Country, and finished his formation with Danok Bat CF. On 5 July 2015, he moved to Athletic Bilbao and was assigned to the farm team in Tercera División.

Bilbao made his senior debut on 3 October 2015, starting in a 0–4 Tercera División away loss against Zalla UC. He scored his first senior goal late in the month, netting the opener in a 2–2 draw at SD Deusto.

On 18 August 2017, Bilbao was loaned to Segunda División B side Gernika Club, for one year. On 17 July of the following year, after featuring sparingly, he signed for fellow league team SD Amorebieta.

Initially a backup option, Bilbao became a starter in the 2020–21 campaign, featuring in 25 league matches (play-offs included) and scoring twice as his side achieved a first-ever promotion to Segunda División; one of his two goals was in a 1–0 away win over CD Badajoz, which sealed the club's promotion. He made his professional debut on 23 August 2021, coming on as a second-half substitute for Gorka Guruzeta in a 0–2 away loss against CD Mirandés.

On 28 June 2022, Bilbao moved abroad for the first time in his career and signed for Greek side PAS Giannina FC. On 30 January 2024, he returned to his home country and its second division, agreeing to a short-term deal with AD Alcorcón.

On 3 July 2024, Bilbao signed for Real Unión on a one-year contract, with the option for a second year.
