= Panagiotis Anastasopoulos =

Greek footballer

Personal information
- Date of birth: 24 October 2003 (age 23)
- Place of birth: Phocis, Greece
- Height: 1.86 m (6 ft 1 in)
- Position: Centre-back

Team information
- Current team: Anagennisi Karditsa
- Number: 55

Youth career
- Panetolikos

Senior career*
Years	Team	Apps	(Gls)
2022–2024	Panetolikos	1	(0)
2024–2025	Kavala	20	(0)
2025–2026	Nestos Chrysoupoli	6	(0)
2026	Egaleo	10	(0)
2026–	Anagennisi Karditsa	0	(0)
- * Club domestic league appearances and goals as of 25 April 2026

Panagiotis Anastasopoulos (Greek: Παναγιώτης Αναστασόπουλος; born 24 October 2003) is a Greek professional footballer who plays as a centre-back for Super League 2 club Anagennisi Karditsa.
