= Rodrigo Erramuspe =

Argentine association football player (born 1990)

Personal information
- Full name: Rodrigo Nahuel Erramuspe
- Date of birth: 3 May 1990 (age 36)
- Place of birth: Mar del Plata, Argentina
- Height: 1.91 m (6 ft 3 in)
- Position: Centre-back

Team information
- Current team: PAS Pyrgos
- Number: 23

Senior career*
Years	Team	Apps	(Gls)
2009–2017	Lanús	34	(0)
2011–2012	→ Unión Santa Fe (loan)	34	(5)
2012–2013	→ Huracán (loan)	25	(1)
2013–2014	→ Rafaela (loan)	34	(1)
2014	→ Huracán (loan)	19	(2)
2015	→ LDU (loan)	1	(0)
2016	→ Tigre (loan)	12	(0)
2017	Unión Santa Fe	12	(1)
2017	Medellín	13	(3)
2018	Nacional	26	(3)
2019	Blooming	16	(2)
2019–2020	Belgrano	8	(1)
2020–2024	PAS Giannina	115	(21)
2024–2025	Levadiakos	16	(1)
2025–2026	Iraklis	24	(4)
2026–	PAS Pyrgos	4	(0)
- * Club domestic league appearances and goals as of 27 September 2026

Rodrigo Nahuel Erramuspe (born 3 May 1990) is an Argentine professional footballer who plays as a centre-back for Super League Greece 2 club PAS Pyrgos.
