= Fabian Ehmann =

Austrian footballer (born 1998)

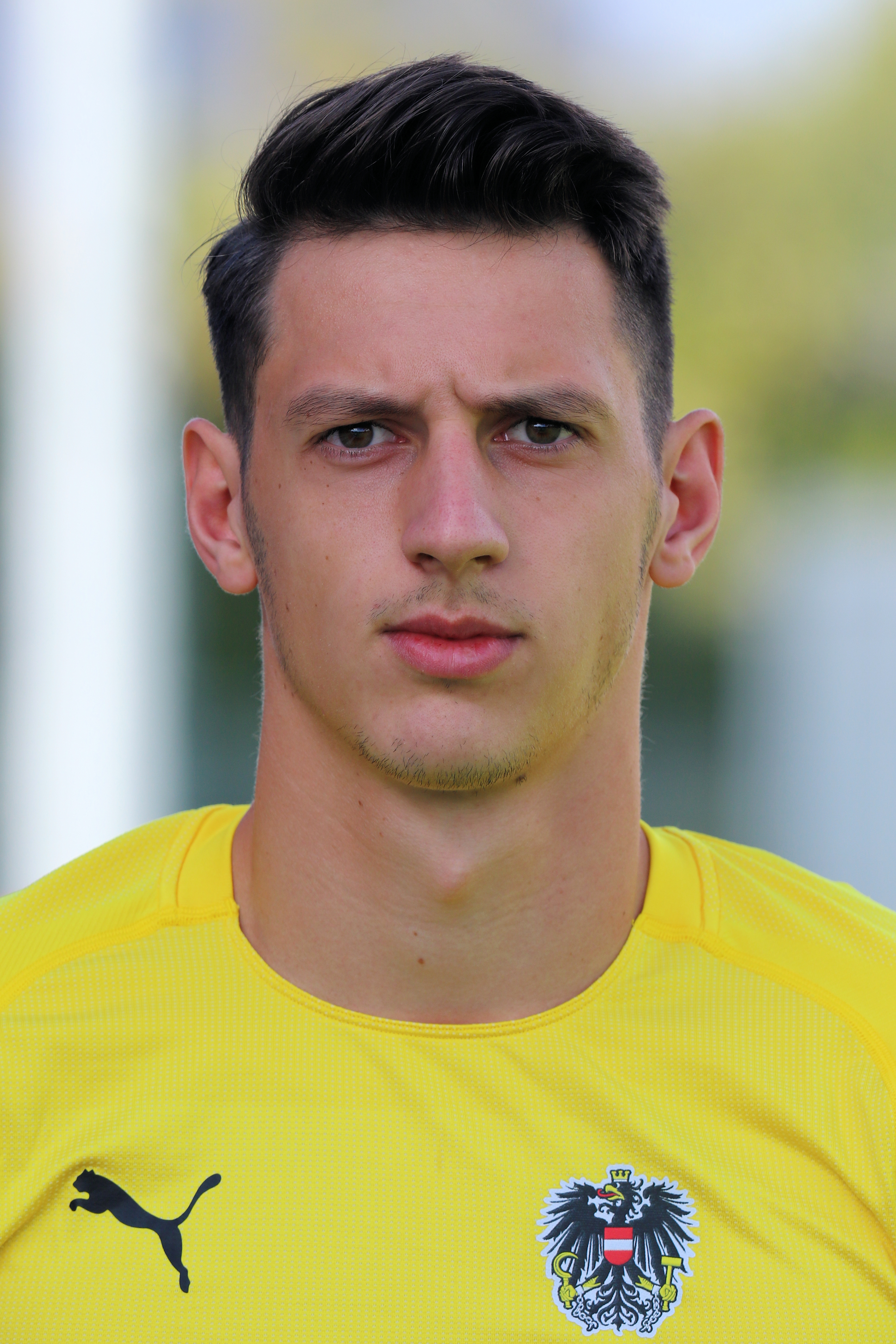

Personal information
- Date of birth: 28 August 1998 (age 28)
- Place of birth: Graz, Austria
- Height: 1.89 m (6 ft 2 in)
- Position: Goalkeeper

Team information
- Current team: Grazer AK
- Number: 98

Youth career
- 2004–2008: LUV Graz
- 2008–2014: Sturm Graz

Senior career*
Years	Team	Apps	(Gls)
2014–2015	Sturm Graz II	37	(0)
2016–2019	Sturm Graz	0	(0)
2018–2019	→ SV Kapfenberg (loan)	26	(0)
2019–2020	Aris	10	(0)
2021	Vendsyssel	7	(0)
2021–2023	SV Horn	44	(0)
2023–2024	TSV Hartberg	0	(0)
2024–2025	ASK Voitsberg	20	(0)
2025–	Grazer AK	0	(0)

International career
2015	Austria U17	9	(0)
2016	Austria U18	4	(0)
2017	Austria U19	7	(0)
2018	Austria U20	1	(0)
2019–2020	Austria U21	9	(0)
- * Club domestic league appearances and goals as of 5 October 2025

Fabian Ehmann (born 28 August 1998) is an Austrian professional footballer who plays as a goalkeeper for Austrian Bundesliga club Grazer AK.

== Club career ==
He competed and advanced to Sturm Graz academies and joined the first team in 2016.

In the 2018–19 season, he played on loan at SV Kapfenberg in the 2. Liga.

On 24 June 2019, Ehmann joined Aris on a two-year deal. The 21-year-old Austrian goalkeeper participated in 11 2019–20 League games after Julián Cuesta received an injury. Unfortunately for Ehmann, he failed to take advantage of the opportunity presented to him, conceding 17 goals and only recording two clean sheets.

On 12 January 2021, Ehmann joined Danish 1st Division club Vendsyssel FF on a deal for the rest of the season.

On 30 June 2021 he returned to Austria and joined SV Horn on a two-year deal.

On 20 January 2023, Ehmann signed with TSV Hartberg until the end of the 2022–23 season.

In 2024, Ehmann signed with recently promoted 2. Liga club ASK Voitsberg, where he was backup to Florian Schögl.

On 28 August 2025, Ehmann joined Grazer AK, signing a one-year contract with the option of a second year.

== Career statistics ==
=== Club ===
As of 22 February 2020

Club	Season	League			Cup		Continental		Other		Total	
Club	Season	Division	Apps	Goals	Apps	Goals	Apps	Goals	Apps	Goals	Apps	Goals
Kapfenberg (loan)	2017–18	2. Liga	26	0	3	0	—		—		29	0
Aris	2019–20	Super League Greece	11	0	0	0	0	0	—		11	0
Career total			37	0	3	0	0	0	0	0	40	0
