= Gerónimo Bortagaray =

Uruguayan footballer

Personal information
- Full name: Gerónimo Bortagaray Derregibus
- Date of birth: 5 August 2000 (age 26)
- Place of birth: Salto, Uruguay
- Height: 1.84 m (6 ft 0 in)
- Position: Centre-back

Team information
- Current team: Boston River
- Number: 14

Youth career
- Montevideo Wanderers

Senior career*
Years	Team	Apps	(Gls)
2019–2022	Montevideo Wanderers	5	(0)
2020	→ Villa Española (loan)	22	(0)
2022–2023	Danubio	34	(0)
2023–2024	PAS Giannina	7	(0)
2024	Ionikos	4	(0)
2024–2025	Chania	9	(1)
2025–	Boston River	19	(1)
- * Club domestic league appearances and goals as of 1 October 2025

Gerónimo Bortagaray Derregibus (born 5 August 2000) is a Uruguayan professional footballer who plays as a centre-back for Boston River.
