= Petros Bagalianis =

Greek footballer (born 2001)

Personal information
- Date of birth: 6 February 2001 (age 25)
- Place of birth: Kallikrateia, Greece
- Height: 1.85 m (6 ft 1 in)
- Position: Centre-back

Team information
- Current team: Alemannia Aachen
- Number: 2

Youth career
- 2009–2019: Aris Thessaloniki

Senior career*
Years	Team	Apps	(Gls)
2018–2021	Aris Thessaloniki	15	(1)
2021–2024	Olympiacos B	61	(2)
2022	Olympiacos	2	(0)
2022	→ PAS Giannina (loan)	8	(0)
2024–2025	Stal Mielec	5	(0)
2025–2026	AEL	13	(2)
2026–	Alemannia Aachen	18	(0)

International career
2020	Greece U21	1	(0)
- * Club domestic league appearances and goals as of 28 May 2026

Petros Bagalianis (Greek: Πέτρος Μπαγκαλιάνης; born 6 February 2001) is a Greek professional footballer who plays as a centre-back for German 3. Liga club Alemannia Aachen.

== Career ==
=== PAS Giannina ===
In summer 2022, Bagalianis moved on loan to PAS Giannina, the main club in the city of Ioannina. On 12 January 2023, Bagalianis returned to Olympiacos B.

=== Stal Mielec ===
On 27 August 2024, Bagalianis joined Polish top-flight club Stal Mielec on a deal until the end of the season, with a one-year extension option. On 9 January 2025, after making five league appearances for Stal, he left the club by mutual consent.

=== AEL ===
On 29 January 2025, Bagalianis signed with Super League Greece 2 club AEL on an eighteen-month deal.

=== Alemannia Aachen ===
On 8 January 2026, Bagalianis joined Alemannia Aachen in German 3. Liga.

== Honours ==
Olympiacos

- Super League Greece: 2021–22
