= Francesc Regis =

Spanish footballer

Xesc Regis
Personal information
- Full name: Francesc Regis Crespí
- Date of birth: 30 September 1996 (age 30)
- Place of birth: Palma, Spain
- Height: 1.80 m (5 ft 11 in)
- Positions: Winger; forward

Team information
- Current team: Volos
- Number: 20

Youth career
- San Francisco
- 2014–2015: Mallorca

Senior career*
Years	Team	Apps	(Gls)
2015–2017	Mallorca B	0	(0)
2015–2016	→ Llosetense (loan)	33	(3)
2016–2017	→ Leioa (loan)	29	(9)
2017–2019	Vitoria	69	(18)
2018	Eibar	1	(0)
2019–2025	Asteras Tripolis	162	(22)
2025–2026	Vanspor	24	(5)
2026–	Volos	5	(0)
- * Club domestic league appearances and goals as of 20 September 2026

Francesc "Xesc" Regis Crespí (born 30 September 1996) is a Spanish professional footballer who plays as a forward for Super League Greece club Volos.

== Club career ==
Regis was born in Palma, Majorca, Balearic Islands, and was a RCD Mallorca youth graduate. In 2015 he was loaned to Segunda División B side CD Llosetense, and made his senior debut on 23 August of that year by coming on as a late substitute in a 1–1 home draw against Valencia CF Mestalla.

Regis scored his first senior goal on 17 January 2016, netting the equalizer in a 3–1 home win against Levante UD B. On 18 August, he moved to fellow third division side SD Leioa, still owned by Mallorca.

On 3 July 2017, Regis signed a two-year deal with SD Eibar and was immediately assigned to CD Vitoria. He made his first team – and La Liga – debut the following 19 May, replacing goalscorer Kike in a 2–2 away draw against Atlético Madrid.

On 2 July 2019, Eibar announced the transfer of Regis to Greek club Asteras Tripolis.

== Career statistics ==
As of match played 29 February 2024

Club	Season	League			National cup		Continental		Other		Total	
Club	Season	Division	Apps	Goals	Apps	Goals	Apps	Goals	Apps	Goals	Apps	Goals
Llosetense (loan)	2015–16	Segunda División B	33	3	—		—		—		33	3
Leioa (loan)	2016–17	Segunda División B	29	9	—		—		—		29	9
Vitoria	2017–18	Segunda División B	33	8	—		—		—		33	8
Vitoria	2018–19	Segunda División B	36	10	—		—		—		36	10
Vitoria	Total		69	18	—		—		—		69	18
Eibar	2017–18	La Liga	1	0	0	0	—		—		1	0
Asteras Tripolis	2019–20	Super League Greece	16	2	4	1	—		—		20	3
Asteras Tripolis	2020–21	Super League Greece	35	2	2	0	—		—		37	2
Asteras Tripolis	2021–22	Super League Greece	29	5	0	0	—		—		29	5
Asteras Tripolis	2022–23	Super League Greece	23	3	1	0	—		—		24	3
Asteras Tripolis	2023–24	Super League Greece	24	6	2	1	—		—		26	7
Asteras Tripolis	Total		127	18	9	2	0	0	—		136	20
Career total			259	48	9	2	0	0	0	0	268	50
