= Campotéjar =

Campotéjar, Spain
- Flag Coat of arms

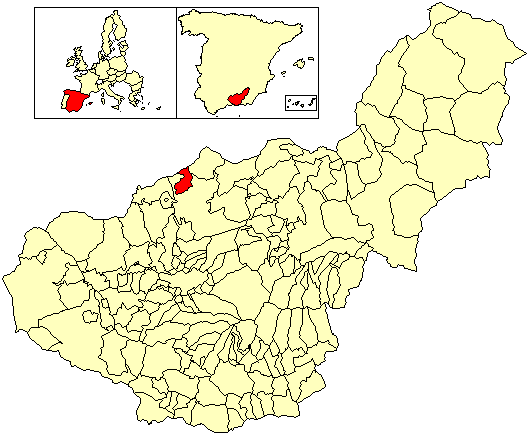
- Location of Campotéjar
- Coordinates: 37°29′N 03°37′W
- Country: Spain
- Province: Granada
- Municipality: Campotéjar

Area
  - Total: 46 km^{2} (18 sq mi)
- Elevation: 906 m (2,972 ft)

Population (2025-01-01)
  - Total: 1,218
  - Density: 26/km^{2} (69/sq mi)
- Time zone: UTC+1 (CET)
  - Summer (DST): UTC+2 (CEST)

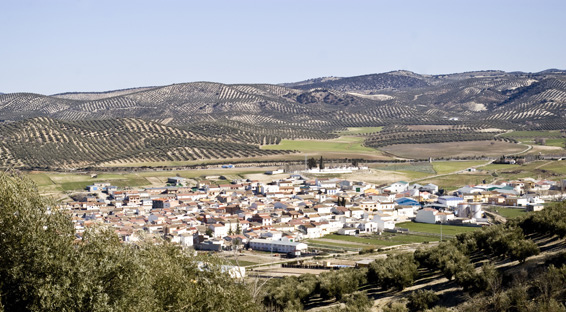
Panorama, Campotéjar (2010)

Campotéjar is a village located in the province of Granada, Spain. According to the 2005 census (INE), the city has a population of 1,441 inhabitants.

== See also ==
- List of municipalities in Granada
