= 2024–25 Greek Football Cup =

2024–25 Greek Cup
Betsson Greek Cup

Tournament details
- Country: Greece
- Teams: 80

Final positions
- Champions: Olympiacos (29th title)
- Runners-up: OFI

Tournament statistics
- Top goal scorer(s): Georgios Manalis; Moritz Heinrich (5 goals each)

The 2024–25 Greek Football Cup, also named Betsson Greek Cup for sponsorship reasons, was the 83rd edition of the Greek Football Cup. Panathinaikos were the defending champions having won the 2023–24 edition of the cup. Olympiacos, the winner of the Cup, earned the right to participate in the 2025–26 UEFA Europa League third qualifying round (although they ultimately qualified for the 2025-26 UEFA Champions League league phase through the Super League) and also in the 2025 Greek Super Cup. Since Olympiacos won both the 2024–25 Super League Greece and the Greek Cup, the Greek Cup's runner-up OFI provided the opposition for the Super Cup match.

== Calendar ==
Round	Main date(s)	Fixtures	Clubs	New entries	Leagues entering
First Round	31 August, 1, 4 September 2024	10	80 → 70	48	Local Cup Winners
Second Round	7, 8 September 2024	26	70 → 42	18	Super League 2
Third Round	14, 15 September 2024	14	42 → 28	none	none
Fourth Round	25, 26 September 2024	12	28 → 16	10	Super League 1, places 5–14
Round of 16	29–31 October & 3–5 December 2024	16	16 → 8	4	Super League 1, places 1–4
Quarter-finals	18 December 2024 & 8, 9 January 2025	8	8 → 4	none	none
Semi-finals	26 February & 2 April 2025	4	4 → 2	none	none
Final	17 May 2025	1	2 → 1	none	none

Source: epo.gr

== Qualifying rounds ==
The draw for the first, second and third round took place on 23 August 2024.

=== First round ===
In the first round of the Competition, the winners of the cup events of the local FCAs participate, while in case of non-participation, the finalists have the right to declare participation. From the FCA of Evrytania, FCA of Arcadia, FCA of Boeotia, FCA of Grevena and FCA of Heraklion, no team declared participation. Last year's finalist from Larissa and Aetoloacarnania declared participation, while from Kavala, Argolis and Pieria the finalists due to the participation of the cup winners in Super League 2.

==== Summary ====
Team 1	Score	Team 2
31 August 2024
Evosmos	4–1	Apollon Paralimnio
1 September 2024
Vyron Kavala	0–1	Aris Avato
Ermis Kanali	0–3	Anagennisi Arta
Atromitos Palamas	3–1	Platamonas Academy
Ethnikos Piraeus	3–1 (a.e.t.)	Agios Nikolaos
Zakynthos	5–0	PAO Varda
Erani Filiatra	4–2	PAS Sparti
Agios Dimitrios Agrinio	0–3	Nea Artaki
AER Afantou	1–1 (3–2 p)	Saronikos Anavyssos
4 September 2024
Apollon Krya Vrysi	3–1	Eordaikos
N/A
Diagoras Rachi Ikaria	bye	
Thyella Chalkios	bye	
Aigeas Plomari	bye	
Doxa Volaka	bye	
Orestis Orestiada	bye	
Panthrakikos	bye	
Kilkisiakos	bye	
Naoussa	bye	
Sarti	bye	
Spartakos Graikochori	bye	
Lefkimmi	bye	
Thyella Katsikas	bye	
Olympiacos Volos	bye	
Trikala	bye	
Smolikas Falani	bye	
Mandraikos	bye	
Episkopi	bye	
Kydonia	bye	
Astrapi Mesopotamia	bye	
Ermis Amyntaio	bye	
Thyella Patras	bye	
Pallixouriakos	bye	
Ermionida	bye	
PAS Korinthos	bye	
Apollon Efpalio	bye	
Asteras Stavros	bye	
Nea Ionia	bye	
Thyella Kamari	bye	

==== Matches ====
31 August 2024
17:00 EEST

Evosmos	4–1	Apollon Paralimnio
Xanthopoulos 18', 67'; Proskynitopoulos 59'; Nikolitsas 65'	Report	Adamidis 83'

Evosmos Stadium, Thessaloniki
Referee: Georgios Aslanidis (Pieria)

1 September 2024
17:00 EEST

Vyron Kavala	0–1	Aris Avato
	Report	Koutsoumpas 74'

Veroulio Stadium, Ilioupoli
Referee: Ioannis Gaitatzis (Athens)

1 September 2024
17:00 EEST

Ermis Kanali	0–3	Anagennisi Arta
	Report	Chimeli 18' (pen.), 60' (pen.); Georgakis 86'

Preveza Municipal Stadium, Preveza
Referee: Georgios Spilios (Corinthia)

1 September 2024
17:00 EEST

Atromitos Palamas	3–1	Platamonas Academy
Kokkinos 10', 83'; Mantelas 90+3'	Report	Tantis 42'

Palamas Municipal Stadium, Palamas
Referee: Theodoros Kontogiorgos (Larissa)

1 September 2024
17:00 EEST

Ethnikos Piraeus	3–1 (a.e.t.)	Agios Nikolaos
Tsatsaris 37'; Tsibokas 104'; Mandamadiotis 119'	Report	Senka 27'

Municipal Stadium of Moschato, Moschato
Referee: Angelos Kostagiannis (Athens)

1 September 2024
16:00 EEST

Zakynthos	5–0	PAO Varda
Gousetis 3'; Zheleku 45'; Nikolitsas 70'; Papanikopoulos 78'; Makris 83'	Report

Zakynthos Municipal Stadium, Zakynthos
Referee: Vasilis Argyropoulos (Corinthia)

1 September 2024
17:00 EEST

Erani Filiatra	4–2	PAS Sparti
Sarantopoulos 1'; Kaplanis 7'; Kollias 76'; Michopoulos 81'	Report	Zacharias 9'; Maltezos 86'

Filiatra Municipal Stadium, Filiatra
Referee: Dimitris Kourtesis (Arcadia)

1 September 2024
17:00 EEST

Agios Dimitrios Agrinio	0–3	Nea Artaki
	Report	Fatjon 15'; Tsoupros 40'; Papadakis 81'

Agrinio Municipal Stadium, Agrinio
Referee: Nikos Chronas (Achaea)

1 September 2024
17:00 EEST

AER Afantou	1–1 (a.e.t.)	Saronikos Anavyssos
Chalkiadakis 18'	Report	Tsoukas 60'
Penalties
Giorgou (penalty scored); Domatas (penalty missed); Moraitis (penalty scored); Karageorgis (penalty scored); Chalkiadakis (penalty missed)	3–2	(penalty scored) Gavasiadis; (penalty scored) Baritakis; (penalty missed) Gino; (penalty missed) Tsoukas; (penalty missed) Delaportas

Afantou Municipal Stadium, Afantou
Referee: Theodoros Maranos (Athens)

4 September 2024
18:30 EEST

Apollon Krya Vrysi	3–1	Eordaikos
Platsiotas 20'; Karabelas 54'; Cerriku 90+2'	Report	Charalampidis 49'

Ioannis Tserkezidis Stadium, Krya Vrysi
Referee: Fotis Tzikas (Macedonia)

=== Second round ===
The 10 teams that qualified from the previous round, the 28 teams that qualified via bye and the 20 teams of Super League 2 participated in the third round. Ionikos withdrew from Super League 2 and then declared withdrawal from the cup as well.

==== Summary ====
Team 1	Score	Team 2
7 September 2024
Doxa Volaka	2–4	Kavala
Thyella Katsikas	0–3	AEL
Olympiacos Volos	1–4 (a.e.t.)	Panachaiki
PAS Korinthos	0–0 (4–5 p)	Diagoras
Diagoras Rachi Ikaria	0–14	A.E. Kifisia
8 September 2024
Orestis Orestiada	0–1	Makedonikos
Aris Avato	1–0	Kilkisiakos
Panthrakikos	9–0	Sarti
Ermis Amyntaio	0–5	Iraklis
Naoussa	0–2	Kampaniakos
Evosmos	0–2	Ethnikos Neo Keramidi
Apollon Krya Vrysi	5–1	Astrapi Mesopotamia
Spartakos Graikochori	0–11	PAS Giannina
Anagennisi Arta	3–0	Pallixouriakos
Zakynthos	3–0	Lefkimmi
Smolikas Falani	0–1	Egaleo
Atromitos Palamas	1–2	Niki Volos
Trikala	2–1	Thyella Patras
Kydonia	0–4	Panionios
Ethnikos Piraeus	3–1	Chania
Mandraikos	1–0	Asteras Stavros
Ermionida	3–0 (w/o)	Ionikos
Erani Filiatra	0–1	Thyella Kamari
Nea Artaki	2–3 (a.e.t.)	Panargiakos
Aigeas Plomari	3–0 (w/o)	Apollon Efpalio
Episkopi	0–1	Kalamata
9 September 2024
Thyella Chalkios	0–3	Ilioupoli
11 September 2024
AER Afantou	0–1 (a.e.t.)	Nea Ionia

==== Matches ====
7 September 2024
16:30 EEST

Doxa Volaka	2–4	Kavala
Giamatzidis 27', 42'	Report	Papadopoulos 20' (pen.), 58'; Lelekas 76'; Itsios 79'

Doxa Drama Stadium, Drama
Referee: Ioannis Tomaras (Thrace)

7 September 2024
16:30 EEST

Thyella Katsikas	0–3	AEL
	Report	Trimmatis 7'; Filios 15' (o.g.); Pasas 59'

Katsikas Stadium, Katsikas
Referee: Alexandros Megas (Pieria)

7 September 2024
16:00 EEST

Olympiacos Volos	1–4 (a.e.t.)	Panachaiki
Gountroumpis 71'	Report	Nili 42'; Patrinos 98'; Rovas 100', 112'

Almyros Municipal Stadium, Almyros
Referee: Meletis Gioumatzidis (Pella)

7 September 2024
16:00 EEST

PAS Korinthos	0–0 (a.e.t.)	Diagoras
	Report
Penalties
Albanis (penalty scored); Manganas (penalty scored); Bibisidis (penalty scored); Charitos (penalty scored); Misku (penalty missed); Glynos (penalty missed)	4–5	(penalty scored) Dimitriou; (penalty scored) Tsiantoulas; (penalty scored) Blancq; (penalty scored) Garoufalias; (penalty missed) Manias; (penalty scored) G. Papadopoulos

Korinthos Stadium, Corinth
Referee: Konstantinos Tikozoglou (Macedonia)

7 September 2024
16:30 EEST

Diagoras Rachi Ikaria	0–14	A.E. Kifisia
	Report	Manalis 2' (pen.), 6', 13', 15'; Mazoulouxis 17'; Müller 27', 32', 53'; Rocha 42'; Pantelidis 47', 58'; Sousa 51'; Zonios 57'; Kyriopoulos 67'

Spyros Gialampidis Stadium, Tavros
Referee: Konstantinos Kapretsos (Macedonia)

8 September 2024
16:30 EEST

Orestis Orestiada	0–1	Makedonikos
	Report	Kouiroukidis 39'

Orestiada Municipal Stadium, Orestiada
Referee: Ioannis Tomaras (Thrace)

8 September 2024
16:30 EEST

Aris Avato	1–0	Kilkisiakos
Giortzinis 85'	Report

Municipal Stadium of Feloni, Feloni
Referee: Giorgos Drosinis (Evrytania)

8 September 2024
16:30 EEST

Panthrakikos	9–0	Sarti
Sarantidis 11', 44'; Pechlivanopoulos 21', 26'; Vaskos 48', 89'; Kokkas 56'; Roubies 82'; Karagiannis 85'	Report

Komotini Municipal Stadium, Komotini
Referee: Anastasios Filippidis (Evros)

8 September 2024
16:30 EEST

Ermis Amyntaio	0–5	Iraklis
	Report	Kynigopoulos 33', 45+4'; Bertoglio 45'; Belmonte 71'; Christodoulopoulos 90+4'

Amyntaio Municipal Stadium, Amyntaio
Referee: Athanasios Dragousis (Kilkis)

8 September 2024
16:30 EEST

Naoussa	0–2	Kampaniakos
	Report	Garyfallos 22'; Kotsopoulos 39'

Municipal Stadium of Naousa, Naoussa
Referee: Georgios-Rafail Drakidis (Xanthi)

8 September 2024
16:30 EEST

Evosmos	0–2	Ethnikos Neo Keramidi
	Report	Notas 36'; Fokaidis 79'

Agrotikos Asteras Stadium, Thessaloniki
Referee: Thomas Bourouzikas (Larissa)

8 September 2024
16:30 EEST

Apollon Krya Vrysi	5–1	Astrapi Mesopotamia
Cani 6'; Karabelas 31'; Tzimas 33'; Chatzidiamantis 62'; Karamanidis 81'	Report	Anastasiou 3'

Ioannis Tserkezidis Stadium, Krya Vrysi
Referee: Loukas Rigopoulos (Imathia)

8 September 2024
16:30 EEST

Spartakos Graikochori	0–11	PAS Giannina
	Report	Heinrich 3', 29', 60', 63'; Bakadimas 17'; Gino 28', 40'; Soria 49', 51'; Léo 82'; Nikolias 90'

Igoumenitsa Stadium, Igoumenitsa
Referee: Konstantinos Kechagias (West Attica)

8 September 2024
15:45 EEST

Anagennisi Arta	3–0	Pallixouriakos
Chimeli 1', 55'; Theodorakis 75'	Report

Arta Stadium, Arta
Referee: Nikos Mangioros (Epirus)

8 September 2024
16:00 EEST

Zakynthos	3–0	Lefkimmi
Makris 38', 54'; Gousetis 43'	Report

Zakynthos Municipal Stadium, Zakynthos
Referee: Athanasios Kefilis (Corinthia)

8 September 2024
16:30 EEST

Smolikas Falani	0–1	Egaleo
	Report	Nikolli 67'

Filippoupoli Stadium, Larissa
Referee: Anastasios Asvestopoulos (Kilkis)

8 September 2024
16:30 EEST

Atromitos Palamas	1–2	Niki Volos
Anagnopoulos 73'	Report	Tzioras 21'; Gadelho 34'

Palamas Municipal Stadium, Palamas
Referee: Konstantinos Boubas (Epirus)

8 September 2024
16:30 EEST

Trikala	2–1	Thyella Patras
Loukas 15'; Alexiou 81'	Report	Kushta 58'

Trikala Municipal Stadium, Trikala
Referee: Vasilios Fitsas (Preveza-Lefkada)

8 September 2024
16:30 EEST

Kydonia	0–4	Panionios
	Report	Piergiacomi 33'; Grontis 35'; Poçi 77'; Lafkas 84'

Minotavros Stadium, Chania
Referee: Konstantinos Foustanas (Macedonia)

8 September 2024
16:00 EEST

Ethnikos Piraeus	3–1	Chania
Potouridis 6', 56'; Georgousis 28'	Report	Kola 22' (pen.)

Municipal Stadium of Moschato, Moschato
Referee: Michalis Balogiannis (Athens)

8 September 2024
16:30 EEST

Mandraikos	1–0	Asteras Stavros
Spyridakis 77'	Report

Municipal Mandra Stadium, Mandra
Referee: Leonidas Stavrou (West Attica)

8 September 2024
16:00 EEST

Ermionida	3–0 (Awarded)	Ionikos
	Report

Kranidi Municipal Stadium, Kranidi

8 September 2024
12:00 EEST

Erani Filiatra	0–1	Thyella Kamari
	Report	Niklitsiotis 56'

Filiatra Municipal Stadium, Filiatra
Referee: Andreas Begos (Argolida)

8 September 2024
16:30 EEST

Nea Artaki	2–3 (a.e.t.)	Panargiakos
Politis 27'; Papadakis 90+10'	Report	Kostika 30'; Chatzidimitriou 48'; Doumanis 109' (o.g.)

Nea Artaki Municipal Stadium, Nea Artaki
Referee: Stefanos-Vaios Kalantzis (Thessaly)

8 September 2024
16:30 EEST

Aigeas Plomari	3–0 (Awarded)	Apollon Efpalio
	Report

Michalelio Stadium, Plomari
Referee: Nikolaos Paterakis (Athens)

8 September 2024
16:30 EEST

Episkopi	0–1	Kalamata
	Report	Pamlidis 28' (pen.)

Theodoros Vardinogiannis Stadium, Heraklion
Referee: Athanasios Boutsikos (Macedonia)

9 September 2024
15:00 EEST

Thyella Chalkios	0–3	Ilioupoli
	Report	Vasiloudis 48'; Manos 70', 89' (pen.)

Thymiana Municipal Stadium, Thymiana
Referee: Panagiotis Koukoulas (Lesbos)

11 September 2024
12:30 EEST

AER Afantou	0–1 (a.e.t.)	Nea Ionia
	Report	Jamaj 111'

Afantou Municipal Stadium, Afantou
Referee: Anargyros Katsinis (East Attica)

=== Third round ===
The winners of the 2nd round participate in the 3rd round. According to the announcement, in the event that a Super League 2 team is drawn with a Cup winner of the local FCA championships then the match will be held at the home ground of the local FCA Cup winner.

==== Summary ====
Team 1	Score	Team 2
14 September 2024
A.E. Kifisia	1–0	Ethnikos Neo Keramidi
Kampaniakos	1–0 (a.e.t.)	Ilioupoli
Makedonikos	0–0 (1–3 p)	AEL
15 September 2024
Panthrakikos	0–2	Panionios
Nea Ionia	1–0	Anagennisi Arta
Aris Avato	1–1 (1–4 p)	Zakynthos
Egaleo	1–1 (4–3 p)	Iraklis
Apollon Krya Vrysi	2–1	Niki Volos
Ermionida	0–7	PAS Giannina
Trikala	1–3	Panargiakos
Thyella Kamari	0–2	Diagoras
Panachaiki	1–0 (a.e.t.)	Kalamata
Ethnikos Piraeus	2–1	Mandraikos
2 October 2024
Aigeas Plomari	1–2 (a.e.t.)	Kavala

==== Matches ====
14 September 2024
15:00 EEST

A.E. Kifisia	1–0	Ethnikos Neo Keramidi
Rocha 20'	Report

Georgios Kamaras Stadium, Rizoupoli
Referee: Dimitris Bekiaris (Corinthia)

14 September 2024
16:30 EEST

Kampaniakos	1–0 (a.e.t.)	Ilioupoli
Kollaras 103'	Report

Kampaniakos Stadium, Thessaloniki
Referee: Andromachi Tsiofliki (Larissa)

14 September 2024
16:30 EEST

Makedonikos	0–0 (a.e.t.)	AEL
	Report
Penalties
Tsoukanis (penalty missed); Sikharulashvili (penalty missed); Cheridis (penalty scored); Lucas (penalty missed)	1–3	(penalty scored) Fatai; (penalty scored) Iliadis; (penalty scored) Acosta

Makedonikos Stadium, Thessaloniki
Referee: Konstantinos Kechagias (West Attica)

15 September 2024
16:00 EEST

Panthrakikos	0–2	Panionios
	Report	Poçi 90+2'; Gemistos 90+8'

Komotini Municipal Stadium, Komotini
Referee: Aristotelis Kostoulas (Arta)

15 September 2024
16:30 EEST

Nea Ionia	1–0	Anagennisi Arta
Platellas 32'	Report

Municipal Stadium of Nea Ionia, Nea Ionia
Referee: Georgios Chronis (West Attica)

15 September 2024
16:30 EEST

Aris Avato	1–1 (a.e.t.)	Zakynthos
Tsaparis 70'	Report	Gousetis 52'
Penalties
Pitsolis (penalty scored); Chatziterzoglou (penalty missed); Anagnostopoulos (penalty missed)	1–4	(penalty scored) Makris; (penalty scored) Nikolakopoulos; (penalty scored) Sourbis; (penalty scored) Liveris

Municipal Stadium of Feloni, Feloni
Referee: Georgios Kosmoglou (Macedonia)

15 September 2024
16:30 EEST

Egaleo	1–1 (a.e.t.)	Iraklis
Daviotis 10'	Report	Tsirigotis 23'
Penalties
Varkas (penalty scored); Karvounis (penalty missed); Zioulis (penalty scored); Tsoukalos (penalty scored); Babis (penalty scored)	4–3	(penalty scored) Tsirigotis; (penalty missed) Bertoglio; (penalty missed) Kivrakidis; (penalty scored) Kushta; (penalty scored) Doukouré

Stavros Mavrothalassitis Stadium, Aigaleo
Referee: Fotis Daoulas (West Attica)

15 September 2024
16:30 EEST

Apollon Krya Vrysi	2–1	Niki Volos
Karabelas 19'; Cerriku 58'	Report	Tzioras 75'

Ioannis Tserkezidis Stadium, Krya Vrysi
Referee: Konstantinos Foustanas (Macedonia)

15 September 2024
16:30 EEST

Ermionida	0–7	PAS Giannina
	Report	Soria 14'; Gino 33' (pen.), 54' (pen.); Šćepović 73', 82'; Nikolias 83'; Nikolias 90+3'

Kranidi Municipal Stadium, Kranidi
Referee: Ioannis Routsis (Corinth)

15 September 2024
16:30 EEST

Trikala	1–3	Panargiakos
Salam 42' (o.g.)	Report	Cani 33'; Kostika 43'; Tsiolis 63'

Trikala Municipal Stadium, Trikala
Referee: Charalampos Margaritis (Corfu)

15 September 2024
16:00 EEST

Thyella Kamari	0–2	Diagoras
	Report	Lioumis 66'; Tsiantoulas 90+1'

Naxos Stadium, Naxos
Referee: Konstantinos Bairaktaris (Athens)

15 September 2024
16:00 EEST

Panachaiki	1–0 (a.e.t.)	Kalamata
Zekhov 109'	Report

Pampeloponnisiako Stadium, Patras
Referee: Ioannis Papageorgopoulos (Argolida)

15 September 2024
16:30 EEST

Ethnikos Piraeus	2–1	Mandraikos
Georgousis 66'; Potouridis 75'	Report	Hallvaxhiu 11'

Municipal Stadium of Moschato, Moschato
Referee: Charalampos Psaridis (Athens)

2 October 2024
13:00 EEST

Aigeas Plomari	1–2 (a.e.t.)	Kavala
Chrysafis 59'	Report	Kasemi 53'; Mandić 118'

Michalelio Stadium, Plomari
Referee: Konstantinos Bairaktaris (Athens)

=== Fourth round ===
The winners of the third round and the Super League 1 teams, that enter at this stage, will participate in the fourth round, apart from the 4 teams participating in the European competitions (PAOK, AEK, Olympiacos, Panathinaikos). The draw was held on 17 September 2024 at the Federation's offices.

Advanced from the third round

- A.E. Kifisia
- Kampaniakos
- AEL
- Panionios
- Nea Ionia
- Zakynthos
- Egaleo
- Apollon Krya Vrysi
- PAS Giannina
- Panargiakos
- Diagoras
- Panachaiki
- Ethnikos Piraeus
- Kavala

Entering in this round

- Aris
- Asteras Tripolis
- Athens Kallithea
- Atromitos
- Lamia
- Levadiakos
- OFI
- Panetolikos
- Panserraikos
- Volos

==== Summary ====
Team 1	Score	Team 2
25 September 2024
Ethnikos Piraeus	0–1	Aris
Apollon Krya Vrysi	0–3	Volos
Egaleo	3–2	Kampaniakos
PAS Giannina	0–2	Panachaiki
Diagoras	0–0 (3–4 p)	Athens Kallithea
Levadiakos	1–2	Atromitos
OFI	2–1	Panetolikos
26 September 2024
A.E. Kifisia	1–0	Lamia
Zakynthos	2–0	Panargiakos
Nea Ionia	0–0 (1–2 p)	Panionios
AEL	0–1	Panserraikos
9 October 2024
Kavala	0–1 (a.e.t.)	Asteras Tripolis

==== Matches ====
25 September 2024
15:00 EEST

Ethnikos Piraeus	0–1	Aris
	Report	Darida 31'

Grigoris lamprakis Stadium, Kallithea, Athens
Referee: Konstantinos Katikos (Athens)

25 September 2024
15:00 EEST

Apollon Krya Vrysi	0–3	Volos
	Report	Koszta 9', 40'; Dosis 42'

Ioannis Tserkezidis Stadium, Krya Vrysi
Referee: Konstantinos Poulikidis (Drama)

25 September 2024
16:00 EEST

Egaleo	3–2	Kampaniakos
Tsoukalos 9'; Varkas 49'; Nikolli 80'	Report	Eppas 57'; Papakonstantinou 90+1'

Stavros Mavrothalassitis Stadium, Aigaleo
Referee: Stefanos Xirogiannis (Boeotia)

25 September 2024
16:00 EEST

PAS Giannina	0–2	Panachaiki
	Report	De Tomás 36' (pen.), 64'

Zosimades Stadium, Ioannina
Attendance: Behind closed doors
Referee: Dimitris Kefalas (Serres)

25 September 2024
17:00 EEST

Diagoras	0–0 (a.e.t.)	Athens Kallithea
	Report
Penalties
Dimitriou (penalty scored); Manolakis (penalty scored); Manias (penalty missed); Tsiantoulas (penalty scored); G. Papadopoulos (penalty missed)	3–4	(penalty missed) Matilla; (penalty scored) Demethryus; (penalty scored) Uldriķis; (penalty scored) Giani; (penalty scored) Mercati

Diagoras Stadium, Rhodes
Referee: Alexandros Tsakalidis (Chalkidiki)

25 September 2024
17:00 EEST

Levadiakos	1–2	Atromitos
Gianniotas 11'	Report	Baku 77', 79'

Levadia Municipal Stadium, Livadeia
Referee: Christos Vergetis (Arcadia)

25 September 2024
18:00 EEST

OFI	2–1	Panetolikos
Nuss 59', 71'	Report	Majdevac 18'

Theodoros Vardinogiannis Stadium, Heraklion
Referee: Panagiotis Tsiaras (Kavala)

26 September 2024
15:00 EEST

A.E. Kifisia	1–0	Lamia
Manalis 80' (pen.)	Report

Michalis Kritikopoulos Stadium, Kaisariani
Referee: Konstantinos Tsetsilas (Grevena)

26 September 2024
15:00 EEST

Zakynthos	2–0	Panargiakos
Stergiou 35'; Papanikopoulos 66'	Report

Zakynthos Municipal Stadium, Zakynthos
Referee: Charalampos Margaritis (Corfu)

26 September 2024
16:00 EEST

Nea Ionia	0–0 (a.e.t.)	Panionios
	Report
Penalties
Antonopoulos (penalty missed); Alemis (penalty missed); Kallitsounakis (penalty scored); Jackson (penalty missed); Platellas (penalty missed)	1–2	(penalty scored) Gemistos; (penalty scored) Felicio; (penalty missed) Venardos; (penalty missed) Kolovos

Spyros Gialampidis Stadium, Tavros
Referee: Konstantinos Kechagias (West Attica)

26 September 2024
19:00 EEST

AEL	0–1	Panserraikos
	Report	Betancor 8'

AEL FC Arena, Larissa
Referee: Ioannis Papadopoulos (Macedonia)

9 October 2024
15:00 EEST

Kavala	0–1 (a.e.t.)	Asteras Tripolis
	Report	Tzimas 115'

Anthi Karagianni Stadium, Kavala
Referee: Stavros Tsimenteridis (Kozani)

== Knockout phase ==
Each tie in the knockout phase, apart from the quarter-finals and the semi-finals, was played by a single match. If the score was level at the end of normal time, extra time was played, followed by a penalty shoot-out if the score was still level. In the quarter-finals and the semi-finals were played over two legs, with each team playing one leg at home. The team that scored more goals on aggregate over the two legs advanced to the next round. If the aggregate score was level, the away goals rule was applied, i.e. the team that scored more goals away from home over the two legs advanced. If away goals were also equal, then extra time was played. The away goals rule was again applied after extra time, i.e. if there were goals scored during extra time and the aggregate score was still level, the visiting team advanced by virtue of more away goals scored. If no goals were scored during extra time, the winners were decided by a penalty shoot-out. In the round of 16, if the score was level at the end of normal time the two-legged rule was applied.
The mechanism of the draws for each round is as follows:

- In the draw for the Round of 16, the four Super League clubs finishing in places 1–4 in the previous season are seeded, while the clubs advancing from the Fifth Round are unseeded.
  The seeded teams are drawn against the unseeded teams, with the seeded teams hosting the second leg. The remaining 8 unseeded clubs will be drawn against one another with the team being drawn last hosting the second leg.
- In the draws for the quarter-finals onwards, there are no seedings and teams from the same group can be drawn against each other.

== Bracket ==
Round of 16
Panserraikos	2	0	2
Panionios	0	3	3
Zakynthos	1	1	2
Asteras Tripolis	2	5	7
OFI	3	0	3
Volos	1	1	2
A.E. Kifisia	1	0	1
Panachaiki	1	1	2
AEK Athens	1	1	2
Aris	0	1	1
Egaleo	0	1	1
PAOK	3	7	10
Athens Kallithea	0	1	1
Olympiacos	1	1	2
Atromitos	1	1	2
Panathinaikos	2	2	4

Quarter-finals
Panionios	0	0	0
Asteras Tripolis	2	2	4
OFI	5	2	7
Panachaiki	0	1	1
AEK Athens (a.e.t.)	1	1	2
PAOK	0	1	1
Panathinaikos	1	0	1
Olympiacos	1	1	2

Semi-finals
Asteras Tripolis	0	1	1
OFI	1	1	2
AEK Athens	0	2	2
Olympiacos	6	0	6

Final
OFI	0
Olympiacos	2

== Round of 16 ==
The 12 winners of the fourth round and the 4 teams participating in the European competitions (PAOK, AEK, Olympiacos, Panathinaikos) participate in the round of 16. The draw took place on 2 October 2024.

=== Summary ===
Team 1	Agg.	Team 2	1st leg	2nd leg
Zakynthos	2–7	Asteras Tripolis	1–2	1–5
OFI	3–2	Volos	3–1	0–1
Atromitos	2–4	Panathinaikos	1–2	1–2
Egaleo	1–10	PAOK	0–3	1–7
A.E. Kifisia	1–2	Panachaiki	1–1	0–1
Athens Kallithea	1–2	Olympiacos	0–1	1–1
AEK Athens	2–1	Aris	1–0	1–1
Panserraikos	2–3	Panionios	2–0	0–3

=== Matches ===
31 October 2024
15:00 EET

Zakynthos	1–2	Asteras Tripolis
Eduardo 83'	Report	Ádám 19', 50'

Zakynthos Municipal Stadium, Zakynthos
Referee: Fotis Polychronis (Pieria)
5 December 2024
19:30 EET

Asteras Tripolis	5–1	Zakynthos
Goss 3', 73'; Álvarez 42'; Bartolo 88', 90+3'	Report	Musta 84'

Theodoros Kolokotronis Stadium, Tripoli
Referee: Petros Tsagarakis (Chania)

Asteras Tripolis won 7–2 on aggregate.

30 October 2024
17:30 EET

OFI	3–1	Volos
Salcedo 26'; Nuss 79'; Shengelia 81'	Report	Koszta 19'

Theodoros Vardinogiannis Stadium, Heraklion
Referee: Petros Tsagarakis (Chania)
4 December 2024
19:30 EET

Volos	1–0	OFI
Kalogeropoulos 90+6'	Report

Panthessaliko Stadium, Volos
Referee: Christos Vergetis (Arcadia)

OFI won 3–2 on aggregate.

4 December 2024
21:30 EET

Atromitos	1–2	Panathinaikos
van Weert 8'	Report	Čerin 45+3'; Ounahi 54'

Peristeri Stadium, Peristeri
Referee: Stavros Tsimenteridis (Kozani)
8 January 2025
20:30 EET

Panathinaikos	2–1	Atromitos
Pellistri 4'; Bakasetas 32'	Report	Athanasiou 50'

Olympic Stadium, Marousi
Referee: Anastasios Papapetrou (Athens)

Panathinaikos won 4–2 on aggregate.

30 October 2024
15:30 EET

Egaleo	0–3	PAOK
	Report	Camara 14'; Shoretire 39'; Murg 54'

Stavros Mavrothalassitis Stadium, Aigaleo
Referee: Panagiotis Tsiaras (Kavala)
4 December 2024
15:30 EET

PAOK	7–1	Egaleo
Shoretire 6'; Tissoudali 12', 47', 51'; Živković 36'; Taison 80'; Thomas 81'	Report	Dritsas 23'

Toumba Stadium, Thessaloniki
Referee: Alexandros Katsikogiannis (Epirus)

PAOK won 10–1 on aggregate.

29 October 2024
15:00 EET

A.E. Kifisia	1–1	Panachaiki
Pantelidis 39'	Report	Zekhov 62'

Zirineio Stadium, Kifissia
Referee: Konstantinos Katoikos (Athens)
3 December 2024
17:00 EET

Panachaiki	1–0	A.E. Kifisia
Poletto 26'	Report

Kostas Davourlis Stadium, Patras
Referee: Spyros Zabalas (Epirus)

Panachaiki won 2–1 on aggregate.

30 October 2024
21:30 EET

Athens Kallithea	0–1	Olympiacos
	Report	Velde 72'

Leoforos Alexandras Stadium, Ampelokipoi
Referee: Christos Vergetis (Arcardia)
4 December 2024
17:30 EET

Olympiacos	1–1	Athens Kallithea
Velde 24'	Report	Manthatis 3'

Karaiskakis Stadium, Piraeus
Referee: Fotis Polychronis (Pieria)

Olympiacos won 2–1 on aggregate.

30 October 2024
19:30 EET

AEK Athens	1–0	Aris
Martial 45+1'	Report

Agia Sophia Stadium, Nea Filadelfeia
Attendance: 21,582
Referee: Anastasios Sidiropoulos (Dodecanese)
3 December 2024
19:30 EET

Aris	1–1	AEK Athens
Morón 45+3'	Report	Martial 81'

Kleanthis Vikelidis Stadium, Thessaloniki
Referee: Vasilis Fotias (Pella)

AEK Athens won 2–1 on aggregate.

29 October 2024
17:30 EET

Panserraikos	2–0	Panionios
Betancor 62' (pen.); Hrustinec 90+2' (o.g.)	Report

Serres Municipal Stadium, Serres
Referee: Petros Tsagarakis (Chania)
5 December 2024
17:00 EET

Panionios	3–0	Panserraikos
Cheryshev 21', 56', 85' (pen.)	Report

Georgios Kamaras Stadium, Rizoupoli
Referee: Angelos Evangelou (Athens)

Panionios won 3–2 on aggregate.

== Quarter-finals ==
=== Summary ===
Team 1	Agg.	Team 2	1st leg	2nd leg
Panionios	0–4	Asteras Tripolis	0–2	0–2
Panathinaikos	1–2	Olympiacos	1–1	0–1
AEK Athens	2–1	PAOK	1–0	1–1
OFI	7–1	Panachaiki	5–0	2–1

=== Matches ===
18 December 2024
17:00 EET

OFI	5–0	Panachaiki
Fountas 8'; Nuss 10'; González 33'; Kostoulas 39' (o.g.); Theodosoulakis 83'	Report

Theodoros Vardinogiannis Stadium, Heraklion
Referee: Anastasios Papapetrou (Athens)
9 January 2025
17:00 EET

Panachaiki	1–2	OFI
Madrigal 53'	Report	Faitakis 13'; Fountas 61'

Kostas Davourlis Stadium, Patras
Referee: Angelos Evangelou (Athens)

OFI won 7–1 on aggregate.

18 December 2024
19:00 EET

Panionios	0–2	Asteras Tripolis
	Report	Kaltsas 80'; Bartolo 90+6' (pen.)

Grigoris Lamprakis Stadium, Kallithea
Referee: Ioannis Papadopoulos (Macedonia)
8 January 2025
18:00 EET

Asteras Tripolis	2–0	Panionios
Regis 48'; Nwgem 65' (o.g.)	Report

Theodoros Kolokotronis Stadium, Tripoli
Referee: Alexandros Tsakalidis (Chalkidiki)

Asteras Tripolis won 4–0 on aggregate.

18 December 2024
21:00 EET

AEK Athens	1–0	PAOK
Lamela 53'	Report

Agia Sophia Stadium, Nea Filadelfeia
Attendance: 27,612
Referee: Simone Sozza (Italy)
9 January 2025
19:30 EET

PAOK	1–1 (a.e.t.)	AEK Athens
Živković 90+1'	Report	Odubajo 107'

Toumba Stadium, Thessaloniki
Attendance: 22,837
Referee: Igor Pajač (Croatia)

AEK Athens won 2–1 on aggregate.

15 January 2025
19:30 EET

Panathinaikos	1–1	Olympiacos
Đuričić 51'	Report	Yaremchuk 75'

Olympic Stadium, Marousi
Referee: Szymon Marciniak (Poland)
5 February 2025
19:30 EET

Olympiacos	1–0	Panathinaikos
Mouzakitis 90+4'	Report

Karaiskakis Stadium, Piraeus
Referee: Juan Martínez Munuera (Spain)

Olympiacos won 2–1 on aggregate.

== Semi-finals ==
=== Summary ===
Team 1	Agg.	Team 2	1st leg	2nd leg
Asteras Tripolis	1–2	OFI	0–1	1–1
Olympiacos	6–2	AEK Athens	6–0	0–2

=== Matches ===
26 February 2025
16:30 EET

Asteras Tripolis	0–1	OFI
	Report	Fountas 24'

Theodoros Kolokotronis Stadium, Tripoli
Referee: Vasilis Fotias (Pella)
2 April 2025
17:00 EEST

OFI	1–1	Asteras Tripolis
Silva 78'	Report	Muñoz 10'

Theodoros Vardinogiannis Stadium, Heraklion
Referee: Anastasios Papapetrou (Athens)

OFI won 2–1 on aggregate.

26 February 2025
20:00 EET

Olympiacos	6–0	AEK Athens
Horta 9', 19'; Yaremchuk 22', 53'; Palma 47'; El Kaabi 78'	Report

Karaiskakis Stadium, Piraeus
Referee: Felix Brych (Germany)
2 April 2025
20:30 EEST

AEK Athens	2–0	Olympiacos
Carmo 37' (o.g.); Mantalos 77'	Report

Agia Sophia Stadium, Nea Filadelfeia
Referee: Rohit Saggi (Norway)

Olympiacos won 6–2 on aggregate.

== Final ==
17 May 2025
20:00 EEST

OFI	0–2	Olympiacos
	Report	El Kaabi 9'; Yaremchuk 90+3'

Olympic Stadium, Marousi
Attendance: 55,000
Referee: Szymon Marciniak (Poland)

== Top scorers ==
Rank	Player	Club	Goals
1	(Greece) Georgios Manalis	A.E. Kifisia	5
1	(Germany) Moritz Heinrich	PAS Giannina	5
3	(Uruguay) Federico Gino	PAS Giannina	4
3	(Paraguay) Wilson Chimeli	Anagennisi Arta	4
3	(Ukraine) Roman Yaremchuk	Olympiacos	4
3	(Argentina) Thiago Nuss	OFI	4
6	(Argentina) Iván Federico Müller	A.E. Kifisia	3
6	(Spain) Carles Soria	PAS Giannina	3
6	(Greece) Vangelis Makris	Zakynthos	3
6	(Greece) Athanasios-Daniel Gousetis	Zakynthos	3
6	(Greece) Themistoklis Potouridis	Ethnikos Piraeus	3
6	(Greece) Stathis Karabelas	Apollon Krya Vrysi	3
6	(Morocco) Tarik Tissoudali	PAOK	3
6	(Russia) Denis Cheryshev	Panionios	3
6	(Hungary) Márk Koszta	Volos	3
6	(Greece) Pavlos Pantelidis	A.E. Kifisia	3
6	(Argentina) Julián Bartolo	Asteras Tripolis	3
6	(Greece) Taxiarchis Fountas	OFI	3
