= Luisinho =

Luisinho is the diminutive of Luís, a Portuguese given name (in English language, Little Louis, in Italian language Luigino).

Notable people with the name include:

== Sportspeople ==
- Luisinho (footballer, born 1911) (1911–1983), Brazilian football forward Luís Mesquita de Oliveira
- Luizinho (footballer, born 1930) (1930–1998), Brazilian football attacking midfielder Luiz Trochillo
- Luisinho Lemos (1951–2019), Brazilian football manager and former striker Luiz Alberto Silva Lemos
- Luizinho das Arábias (1957–1989), Brazilian football forward Luiz Alberto Duarte dos Santos
- Luizinho (footballer, born 1958), Brazilian football defender Luiz Carlos Ferreira
- Luisinho (footballer, born 1965), Brazilian football midfielder Luís Carlos Quintanilha
- Luizinho (Angolan footballer) (born 1969), Angolan football forward Luis Domingos Antonio Cazengue
- Luizinho Vieira (born 1972), Brazilian manager and former midfielder Luiz Henrique Vieira
- Luisinho Dias (born 1973), Mozambican football goalkeeper Luís Germano Borlotes Dias
- Luisinho Netto (born 1974), Brazilian football right-back Luís Idorildo Netto da Cunha
- Luizinho (footballer, born 1977), Brazilian football midfielder Luiz Fernando Pontes Ribeiro
- Luizinho Lopes (born 1981), Brazilian football manager and former midfielder Luiz Júnior de Souza Lopes
- Luizinho (footballer, born 1982), Portuguese football full-back Luiz Antônio de Oliveira
- Luisinho (footballer, born 1985), Portuguese football left-back Luís Carlos Correia Pinto
- Luizinho (footballer, born 1985), Brazilian football forward Luís Carlos Fernandes
- Luisinho (footballer, born 1990), Portuguese football winger Luís Miguel Pinheiro Andrade
- Luisinho (footballer, born 1991), Brazilian football winger Luis Gustavo Melere da Silva
- Luizinho (footballer, born 1996), Brazilian football attacking midfielder Luiz Henrique Alves Angelo
- Luisinho (footballer, born 1998), Brazilian football midfielder Luis Carlos dos Santos Amorim

== Other ==
- Luizinho Drummond (1940-2020), illegal lottery operator Luiz Pacheco Drummond
- Luizinho Faleiro (born 1951), Indian National Congress politician from Goa
