= Nikos Badimas =

Greek footballer and manager

Personal information
- Full name: Nikolaos Badimas
- Date of birth: 16 December 1974 (age 51)
- Place of birth: Athens, Greece

Team information
- Current team: Trikala (manager)

Youth career
- Panionios

Senior career*
Years	Team	Apps	(Gls)
- P.A.O. Rouf
- Foinikas Kallithea
- AO Terpsithea
- Charavgiakos
- Thriamvos Serviana
- AO Trachones

Managerial career
- Kaisariani
- Dafni Palaio Faliro
- −2016: AO Terpsithea
- 2016−2019: PAS Giannina U−17
- 2019−2021: PAS Giannina (assistant)
- 2021–2022: Ergotelis
- 2022–2023: Kozani
- 2023–2024: Marko
- 2024: Levadiakos (assistant)
- 2024: Aris Petroupoli
- 2025: Panegialios
- 2025: PAS Giannina
- 2025: Ilioupoli
- 2025–: Trikala
- * Club domestic league appearances and goals

Nikos Badimas (Greek: Νίκος Μπαδήμας; born 16 December 1974) is a Greek professional football manager and former player. He is the current manager of Gamma Ethniki club Trikala.

== Playing career ==
As a player, Badimas started from the infrastructure segments of Panionios, where he played for the U−19 squad. He then spent the rest of his playing career with P.A.O. Rouf, Foinikas Kallithea, A.O. Terpsithea, Charavgiakos, Thriamvos and AO Trachones.

== Managerial career ==
Badimas began his coaching career in Kaisariani, followed by Dafni Palaio Faliro and AO Terpsithea. In 2016 he took over PAS Giannina U−17 with whom he reached the Final-4 in the Greek U−17 championship. In 2019, he was appointed assistant to PAS Giannina head coach Argiris Giannikis, while simultaneously serving as the Technical Director of the club's infrastructure departments, as well as the head coach of the U−19 squad.

In June 2021, Badimas was hired as manager of Super League 2 club Ergotelis. In August 2022, Badimas was hired as manager of Kozani.
