= Nikos Moustakis =

Greek footballer

Personal information
- Full name: Nikolaos Moustakis
- Date of birth: 4 May 1990 (age 36)
- Place of birth: Athens, Greece
- Height: 1.79 m (5 ft 10 in)
- Position: Right-back

Team information
- Current team: Panelefsiniakos

Youth career
- AEK Athens

Senior career*
Years	Team	Apps	(Gls)
2009–2010	Nea Ionia		
2010–2012	Vyzas Megara	21	(1)
2012–2013	Nea Ionia		
2013	Turnu Severin	0	(0)
2013–2014	Glyfada	18	(0)
2014–2015	Fokikos	13	(0)
2015	OFI		
2015–2017	Acharnaikos	36	(1)
2017	Panelefsiniakos	9	(0)
2017–2019	Aittitos Spata		
2019–2022	Ionikos	42	(0)
2022	A.E. Kifisia	21	(0)
2022–	Panelefsiniakos	0	(0)
- * Club domestic league appearances and goals as of 1 May 2022

Nikos Moustakis (Greek: Νίκος Μουστάκης; born 4 May 1990) is a Greek professional footballer who plays as a right-back for Panelefsiniakos.
