= Pavlos Pantelidis =

Greek footballer (born 2002)

Personal information
- Full name: Pavlos Emmanouil Pantelidis
- Date of birth: 16 September 2002 (age 24)
- Place of birth: Athens, Greece
- Height: 1.83 m (6 ft 0 in)
- Position: Winger

Team information
- Current team: Panathinaikos
- Number: 17

Youth career
- Nea Ionia
- Panathinaikos
- 2020–2021: Thyella Rafina

Senior career*
Years	Team	Apps	(Gls)
2021–2023	Thyella Rafina	27	(15)
2023–2026	A.E. Kifisia	37	(11)
2023–2024	→ Ilioupoli (loan)	28	(9)
2026–	Panathinaikos	8	(0)
- * Club domestic league appearances and goals as of 12 May 2026

Pavlos Pantelidis (Greek: Παύλος Παντελίδης; born 16 September 2002) is a Greek professional footballer who plays as a forward for Super League club Panathinaikos.

== Club career ==
Pantelidis is a product of the youth academies of the Greek clubs Nea Ionia and Panathinaikos, before moving to Thyella Rafina on 8 June 2020 where he began his senior career. He finished top scorer in the Gamma Ethniki for the 2022–23 season with 15 goals in 23 matches. In the summer of 2023, he joined A.E. Kifisia and immediately went on loan with Ilioupolis for the 2023–24 season. Returning to Kifisia, he extended his contract with the club for 3 years on 24 September 2024. He helped the club win the 2024–25 Super League Greece 2 and played a key role helping them earn promotion Super League Greece for the 2025–26 season. On 15 October 2025 he was transferred alongside teammate Andrews Tetteh to Panathinaikos in the summer of 2026, with an option to move in January 2026.

On 15 October 2025, Panathinaikos purchased Pantelidis alongside his teammate Andrews Tetteh for an eventual transfer in summer 2026, with an option to move in January 2026.

== International career ==
On 6 October 2025, Pantelidis was called up to the senior Greece national team for a set of 2026 FIFA World Cup qualification matches.

== Personal life ==
Pantelidis holds a degree from the Department of Port Management and Shipping from the National and Kapodistrian University of Athens, and had the backup plan of working in sailing prior to achieving promotion to professional football with Kifisia.

== Career statistics ==
As of match played 12 May 2026

Club	Season	League			Greek Cup		Europe		Other		Total	
Club	Season	Division	Apps	Goals	Apps	Goals	Apps	Goals	Apps	Goals	Apps	Goals
Ilioupoli (loan)	2023–24	Super League Greece 2	28	9	1	0	—		—		29	9
A.E. Kifisia	2024–25	Super League Greece 2	24	4	5	3	—		1	0	30	7
A.E. Kifisia	2025–26	Super League Greece	13	7	1	0	—		—		14	7
A.E. Kifisia	Total		37	11	6	3	—		1	0	44	14
Panathinaikos	2025–26	Super League Greece	8	0	2	0	0	0	—		10	0
Career total			73	20	9	3	0	0	1	0	83	23

== Honours ==
A.E. Kifisia

- Super League Greece 2: 2024–25

Individual

- 2022–23 Gamma Ethniki top scorer (15 goals)
