= Marios Spyridakis =

Greek association footballer

Personal information
- Full name: Marios Spyridon Spyridakis
- Date of birth: 24 September 2003 (age 23)
- Place of birth: Greece
- Height: 1.76 m (5 ft 9 in)
- Position: Winger

Team information
- Current team: Iraklis Xylokastro

Youth career
- Olympiacos

Senior career*
Years	Team	Apps	(Gls)
2021–2022	Olympiacos B	3	(0)
2022–2023	AEK Athens B	4	(0)
2023–2024	Nea Ionia		
2024–2025	Mandraikos		
2025	Nea Ionia		
2025–	Iraklis Xylokastro		
- * Club domestic league appearances and goals as of 27 January 2023

Marios Spyridakis (Greek: Μάριος Σπυριδάκης; born 24 September 2003) is a Greek professional footballer who plays as a winger for Iraklis Xylokastro.
