= Olympiakos Nea Liosia F.C. =

Olympiakos Nea Liosia
- Full name: Olympiakos Athlitikos Podosfairikos Ekdromikos Omilos Neon Liosion
- Founded: 1952; 74 years ago
- Ground: Municipal Stadium of Ilion
- Capacity: 696 (all seated)
- Chairman: Ilias Koutsos
- Manager: Murat Seropian
- League: Athens FCA First Division
- 2025–26: Athens FCA First Division (Group 1), 2nd
- Website: olympiacosneonliosion.gr

Olympiakos Nea Liosia is a Greek football club based in Ilion, Greece. The team was founded in 1952, when the city was named Nea Liosia. The home stadium of the team is the Municipal Stadium of Ilion.

They team participated seven times in the Football League (Greece) between 1974 and 1981.

== History ==
From 1952 when it was founded until 1979, the club was continuously moving up divisions without being relegated even once, which constitutes a rare record. Its 27-year continuous upward trajectory started from the probationary division of Athens FCA, then it joined the Third Division, in 1957 it was promoted to B2, in 1959 to B1, in 1961 to A2, the following year to A1, and in 1965 to the First Division, where it remained until 1973, playing a leading role.

The club has a presence in national divisions, highlighted by its appearances in the Beta Ethniki category, where it competed 7 times in total, 6 of which were consecutive. It also boasts a multi-year presence in Delta Ethniki, counting 14 total appearances. Notably, until 1979, Olympiacos Nea Liosia held the rare record of never having been relegated since the day of its foundation.

== Honours ==
- Athens FCA First Division winner (2):
  - 1994–95, 2006–07 (co-champion)
