= Giannis Doiranlis =

Greek footballer

Personal information
- Full name: Ioannis Panagiotis Doiranlis
- Date of birth: 29 September 2002 (age 24)
- Place of birth: Thessaloniki, Greece
- Height: 1.80 m (5 ft 11 in)
- Position: Midfielder

Team information
- Current team: A.E Kifisia
- Number: 4

Youth career
- Makedonikos

Senior career*
| Years | Team | Apps | (Gls) |
| 2019–2021 | Makedonikos | | |
| 2021–2022 | Pafos | 0 | (0) |
| 2021–2022 | → Akritas Chlorakas (loan) | 2 | (0) |
| 2022–2024 | Iraklis | 30 | (1) |
| 2024–2025 | Lamia | 29 | (1) |
| 2025–2026 | Panserraikos | 27 | (1) |
| 2026– | A.E Kifisia | 0 | (0) |
- * Club domestic league appearances and goals as of 14 June 2026

Giannis Doiranlis (Greek: Γιάννης Δοϊρανλής; born 29 September 2002) is a Greek professional footballer who plays as a midfielder for Super League club A.E Kifisia.

== Career ==
=== Lamia ===
On 2 July 2024, Doiranlis signed a contract with Super League club Lamia.

== Career statistics ==
As of 4 August 2024

| Club | Season | League | | | Cup | | Continental | | Other | | Total | |
| Club | Season | Division | Apps | Goals | Apps | Goals | Apps | Goals | Apps | Goals | Apps | Goals |
|---|---|---|---|---|---|---|---|---|---|---|---|---|
| Iraklis | 2022–23 | Superleague Greece 2 | 10 | 0 | 0 | 0 | — | | — | | 10 | 0 |
| Iraklis | 2023–24 | Superleague Greece 2 | 20 | 1 | 1 | 0 | — | | — | | 21 | 1 |
| Iraklis | Total | | 30 | 1 | 1 | 0 | — | | — | | 31 | 1 |
| Lamia | 2024–25 | Superleague Greece | 29 | 1 | 1 | 0 | — | | — | | 30 | 1 |
| Career total | | | 59 | 2 | 2 | 0 | 0 | 0 | 0 | 0 | 61 | 2 |
