= Georgios Manalis =

Greek association football player (born 1994)

Giorgos Manalis
Personal information
- Full name: Georgios Manalis
- Date of birth: 21 December 1994 (age 31)
- Place of birth: Athens, Greece
- Height: 1.82 m (5 ft 11 1/2 in)
- Position: Forward

Team information
- Current team: Panionios
- Number: 27

Youth career
- Aetos Korydallos

Senior career*
Years	Team	Apps	(Gls)
2014–2019	Ethnikos Piraeus	113	(42)
2019–2022	Ionikos	73	(11)
2022–2024	Chania	49	(32)
2024–2025	A.E. Kifisia	27	(15)
2025–2026	Iraklis	23	(12)
2026–	Panionios	3	(2)
- * Club domestic league appearances and goals as of 19 September 2026

Giorgos Manalis (Greek: Γιώργος Μάναλης; born 21 December 1994) is a Greek professional association football player who plays as a forward for Super League 2 club Panionios.

== Career ==
Manalis is known for his success as a goal scorer. During the 2023–2024 season, Manalis was voted MVP named top scorer of the Group B division with 18 goals across 29 appearances.

In June 2024, Manalis joined A.E. Kifisia. In September 2024, Manalis scored the winning goal, via penalty for A.E. Kifisia against Lamia in the qualifier for the Greek Cup. The goal was made notable due to the fact Manalis's father had died the previous day.
