= Giorgos Kyriopoulos =

Greek footballer

Personal information
- Full name: Georgios Kyriopoulos
- Date of birth: 24 August 2004 (age 22)
- Place of birth: Kos, Greece
- Height: 1.79 m (5 ft 10 in)
- Position: Winger

Team information
- Current team: A.E. Kifisia (on loan from Panathinaikos)
- Number: 18

Youth career
- 2009–2018: A.O. Athlopedion Kos
- 2018–2023: Panathinaikos

Senior career*
Years	Team	Apps	(Gls)
2022–2024	Panathinaikos B	40	(1)
2022–	Panathinaikos	0	(0)
2024–2025	→ A.E. Kifisia (loan)	24	(4)
2026–	→ A.E. Kifisia (loan)	4	(0)

International career^{‡}
2022–2023	Greece U19	9	(1)
2024–	Greece U21	2	(1)
- * Club domestic league appearances and goals as of 7 November 2026 ‡ National team caps and goals as of 14 March 2026

Giorgos Kyriopoulos (Greek: Γιώργος Κυριόπουλος; born 24 August 2004) is a Greek professional footballer who plays as a winger for A.E. Kifisia, on loan from Panathinaikos. He has represented the national team at the U19 and U21 levels.

== Club career ==
He joined the academies of Panathinaikos in 2018 and signed his first professional contract in 2023, which runs until 2022. He made his debut for Panathinaikos' first team on 15 December 2022 in a match against Volos in the Greek Cup. In 2023, he also participated in the first team's pre-season preparation. During the 2022–23 and 2023–24 seasons he played for Panathinaikos' second team (Panathinaikos B) with which he made total 40 appearances and scored 1 goal. In September 2024 he was loaned to Kifisia, where he remained until June 2025. In June 2025 he renewed his contract until 2028 and he returned to Panathinaikos. On 18 July 2025, during training he suffered cruciate ligament tear, which kept him sidelined for 9 months.On 5 Aughust 2026, he returned in the panathinaikos squad in the match against csska 1948 for the 3rd qualifying round of the Uefa Europa Conference League.
