= Giannis Sotirakos =

Greek footballer

Personal information
- Full name: Ioannis Sotirakos
- Date of birth: 19 January 1995 (age 31)
- Place of birth: Athens, Greece
- Height: 1.81 m (5 ft 11 in)
- Position: Centre-back

Team information
- Current team: Athens Kallithea
- Number: 19

Youth career
- Olympiacos

Senior career*
Years	Team	Apps	(Gls)
2014–2015	Niki Volos	4	(0)
2015	Lamia	1	(0)
2015–2017	Acharnaikos	42	(1)
2017–2019	Panachaiki	35	(1)
2019–2021	Chania	39	(0)
2021–2023	A.E. Kifisia	42	(2)
2023–2024	Levadiakos	7	(0)
2024–2025	A.E. Kifisia	24	(2)
2025–	Athens Kallithea	18	(0)

International career^{‡}
2011	Greece U17	3	(0)
2013	Greece U18	5	(0)
2013–2014	Greece U19	10	(0)
- * Club domestic league appearances and goals as of 25 April 2026 ‡ National team caps and goals as of 30 May 2014

Giannis Sotirakos (Greek: Γιάννης Σωτηράκος; born 19 January 1995) is a Greek professional footballer who plays as a centre-back for Super League 2 club Athens Kallithea.
