= Alexis Koutsias =

Greek footballer

Personal information
- Full name: Alexios Koutsias
- Date of birth: 28 November 2002 (age 23)
- Place of birth: Athens, Greece
- Height: 1.74 m (5 ft 9 in)
- Position: Left-back

Team information
- Current team: Nea Ionia
- Number: 35

Youth career
- 2018–2021: Panathinaikos

Senior career*
Years	Team	Apps	(Gls)
2021–2022	Panathinaikos	0	(0)
2021	→ Panionios (loan)		
2021–2022	Panathinaikos B	22	(2)
2022–2023	Episkopi	27	(2)
2023–2024	Panachaiki	3	(0)
2026	Glyka Nera	0	(0)
2026–	Nea Ionia	0	(0)
- * Club domestic league appearances and goals as of 25 August 2026

Alexis Koutsias (Greek: Αλέξης Κούτσιας; born 28 November 2002) is a Greek professional footballer who plays as a left-back for Gamma Ethniki club Nea Ionia.
