= Alexandros Karachalios =

Greek footballer

Personal information
- Full name: Alexandros Karachalios
- Date of birth: 20 October 1985 (age 41)
- Place of birth: Athens, Greece
- Height: 1.83 m (6 ft 0 in)
- Position: Winger

Senior career*
Years	Team	Apps	(Gls)
2003–2004	Panionios	4	(0)
2004–2006	Akratitos	6	(0)
2006–2007	Kavala	25	(2)
2007–2008	Kallithea	2	(0)
2008–2009	Koropi	16	(3)
2009–2011	Aias Salamina	52	(16)
2011–2012	AEL	1	(0)
2012	Diagoras	0	(0)
2012	Apollon Smyrnis	1	(0)
2013	Paniliakos	10	(0)
2013–2014	Kalamata	28	(4)
2014–2015	Nea Ionia		
2015	Ionikos		
2016	Olympiakos Agios Stefanos		
- * Club domestic league appearances and goals as of 30 December 2012 ‡ National team caps and goals as of 30 December 2012

Alexandros Karachalios (Greek: Αλέξανδρος Καραχάλιος; born 20 October 1985) is a Greek footballer who plays as a right winger.

== Career ==
Born in Athens, Karachalios began his playing career at Panionios. He played in the Super League Greece for both Panionios and Akratitos.
