= Antonis Tritsis Metropolitan Park =

Public park in Ilion, Attica region, Greece

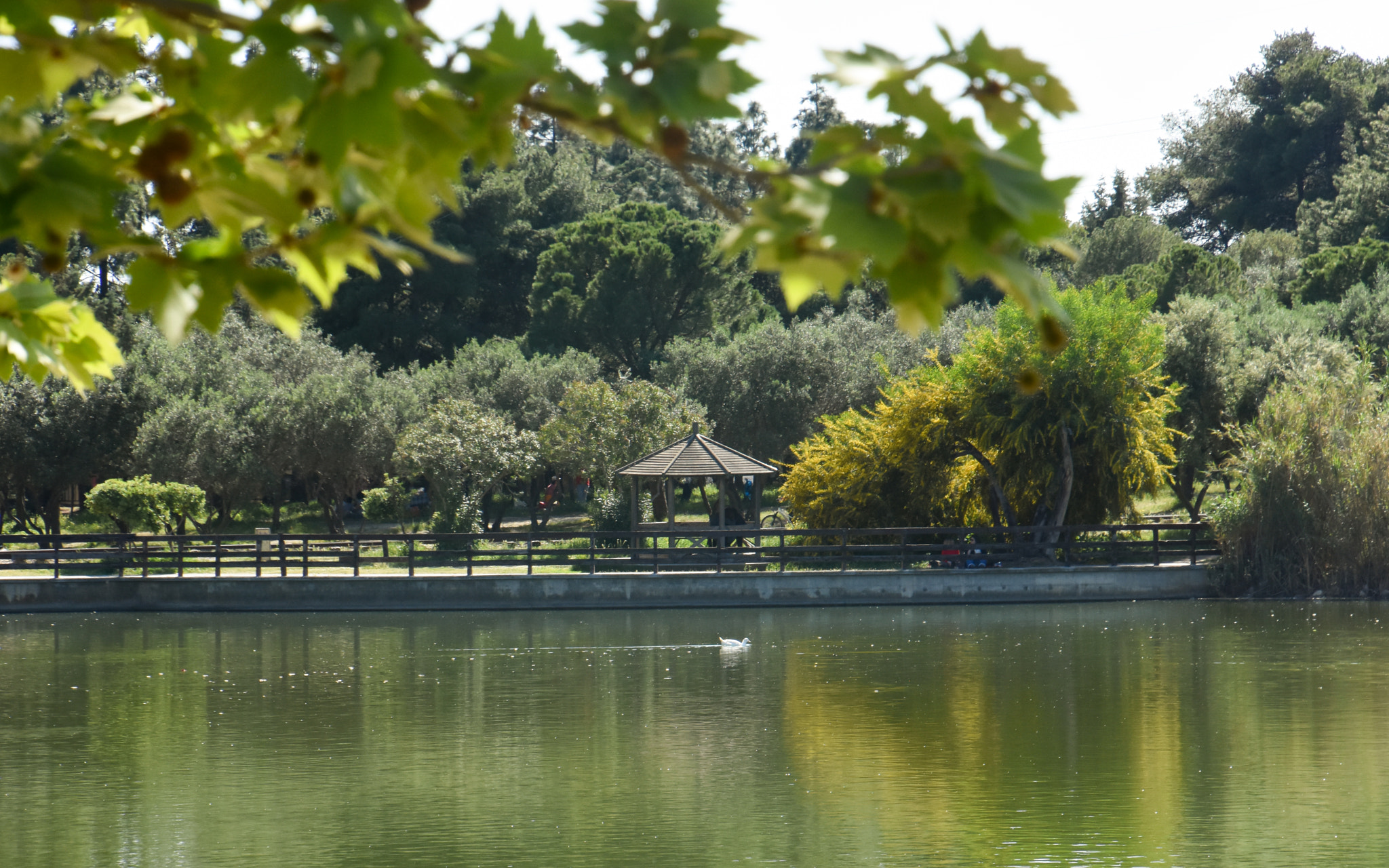
- Kifisida, park's central lake.
- Interactive map of Antonis Tritsis Metropolitan Park
- Type: Public park
- Location: Ilion, Greece
- Coordinates: 38°2′22.34″N 23°43′14.81″E
- Area: 500 hectares (1,200 acres)
- Created: 1832
- Operator: Antonis Tritsis Metropolitan Park Management Body
- Status: Open year round
- Public transit: Α10, Β10, Β12, 704, 711, 735, 892; (expected)
- Website: parkotritsis.gr

Antonis Tritsis Metropolitan Park (Greek: Μητροπολιτικό Πάρκο «Αντώνης Τρίτσης») is a public park in Ilion, Greece, and it is the largest park in Attica. The park is the only one dedicated exclusively to environmental awareness and education in Greece.
