= A.O. Nea Ionia F.C. =

Greek football club

- Full name: Athlitikos Omilos Neas Ionias (Athletic Union of New Ionia)
- Nickname: Κυανοκίτρινοι (Blue-Yellows)
- Founded: 1927; 99 years ago; (as OFNI); 1947; 79 years ago; (as AE Nea Ionia); 1961; 65 years ago; (as Eleftheroupoli Nea Ionia); 1962; 64 years ago; (as AE Nea Ionia); 1967; 59 years ago; (as Elpida Nea Ionia); 1975; 51 years ago; (as AE Nea Ionia); 1979; 47 years ago; (as OFNI); 1988; 38 years ago; (as Ionikos Nea Ionia); 2001; 25 years ago; (as AO Nea Ionia)
- Ground: Municipal Stadium of Nea Ionia
- Capacity: 3,000
- Chairman: Theodoros Douridas
- Head Coach: Paraskevas Konstantakopoulos
- League: Gamma Ethniki
- 2025–26: Gamma Ethniki (Group 5), 8th
- Website: http://www.aonionias.gr/
Home colours	Away colours

A.O. Nea Ionia F.C., officially known as Nea Ionia (Greek: Νέα Ιωνία, Athlitikos Omilos Neas Ionias), the "Athletic Union of New Ionia", is a Greek association football club based in the city of Nea Ionia, Greece. The club currently competes in the Gamma Ethniki, the third division in the Greek football pyramid.

== History ==
At the end of the first decade of the previous century, the town of Nea Ionia had a lot of football clubs, each with its separate football history. The town was known to the rest of Athens for its sport-active inhabitants. Insights gleaned from the archives of the country's newspapers reveal intriguing details about a club named Omilos Filathlon Nea Ionia (OFNI), which is noted to have been established in either 1927 or 1928, according to different sources. The period from 1940 to 1942 saw the club halt its athletic programs as a result of World War II. Following the war, in 1947, the club re-emerged under the name AE Nea Ionia and began to systematically develop a variety of activities. In 1961, AE Eleftheroupoli assimilated the football club with the intention of forming a stronger team dedicated to excelling in the second division. The subsequent year witnessed the dissolution of the merger between the two clubs, primarily driven by numerous disagreements regarding the club's organizational structure. The year 1967 saw, once again, the club forced to merge with AE Eleftheroupoli, ultimately leading to the creation of Elpida Nea Ionia as a consequence of the junta regime's influence. Following the fall of the military junta in Greece, the club was reinstated and adopted the name AE Nea Ionia. The club Athlitiki Enosi Nea Ionia held onto its name until 1979, when it chose to rebrand itself as OFNI. In that same year, OFNI proceeded to merge with Ikaros football club and continued to operate under the name OFNI. In 1988, the newly established OFNI club underwent a merger with PAO Kalogreza, giving rise to Ionikos Nea Ionia. This partnership developed further when Ionikos allied with AO Neapoli, leading to the formation of AO Nea Ionia in 2001. The basic colours of the team are yellow and blue.

In the 2007–08 season, AEK Athens was scheduled to compete on artificial turf against Red Bull Salzburg in the second leg of the first qualifying round for the 2007–08 UEFA Cup. In a spirit of cooperation, Nea Ionia permitted AEK Athens to utilize its artificial pitch, facilitating the acclimatization of their players. In exchange, AEK Athens committed to competing in two friendly matches with the Ionian football club. The training center of AEK Athens and the Olympic Stadium of Athens hosted these friendly matches, both of which concluded with Nea Ionia football club suffering defeats (0-1 and 1-3).

The football club was relegated from the Greek Football League 2 in the 2014–15 season, as their performance resulted in a 13th-place standing in Group 4. The 2015–16 football season saw the club entering the local championships as a consequence of a change in ownership and serious financial issues.

In 2018, the club appealed to the Hellenic Football Federation for the training compensation (€29.500) of Marios Ogboe's transfer from OFI Crete to Hamilton Academical and won the case.

In April 2024, the football club of Nea Ionia won its first regional cup against Aris Petroupolis in a final held at Georgios Kamaras Stadium. In that same month, the club achieved a significant milestone by securing its inaugural regional championship.

On 11 September 2024, the football club of Nea Ionia defeated AER Afantou in the second qualifying round of the 2024–25 Greek Football Cup, recording its ninth win in the Greek Cup. On 15 September 2024, Nea Ionia defeated Anagennisi Artas breaking a record by advancing to the fourth qualifying round of the Greek Cup for the first time in its history. On 26 September 2024, the club was disqualified, in penalties (1–2), by Panionios football club and lost its chance to participate in the fifth round of the 2024–25 Greek Football Cup.

== Stadium ==
The municipal stadium located in Nea Ionia serves as the home ground for the A.O. Nea Ionia football club, and it was built in 1962. The stadium's main access point is located along Olympias Street. In 2004, the entire stadium underwent significant renovations, including the installation of a state-of-the-art turf system on the pitch. It is important to acknowledge that the upgrade of the dressing rooms was accomplished solely in 2007. In 2015, the construction of the new facilities and stands was entirely funded by the government of Greece. Additionally, this stadium acts as the primary venue for Eleftheroupoli and P.A.O. Alsoupoli football clubs, playing a significant role in the community's sports culture. In August 2024, the local government funded the renovation of the stadium's track and the upgrade of the floodlights.

Beginning in 1932, numerous significant matches of the club were held at AEK's stadium. This was largely attributed to the insufficient resources of local authorities and the overwhelming number of teams within the municipality of Nea Ionia, which hindered the establishment of a suitable facility for the local football clubs.

Part of the dramatic film 'The Striker with Number 9', directed by Pantelis Voulgaris, was filmed in this stadium.

== Supporters ==
The club's fan group, Refugees Nea Ionia, is well known for its strong antifascist stance. This antifascist mentality is a result of the club's fan base being the descendants of the 6,000 Asia Minor refugees who were selected to settle in the region during the population exchange between Greece and Turkey in 1922. These refugees were coal miners in the area and part of the Greek Resistance (EAM), which fought the Nazis and their Greek collaborators in the Kalogreza Block during World War II. Of these miners, twenty-two were executed.

== Honours ==
A.O. Nea Ionia F.C. honours
Type	Competition	Titles	Winners	Runners-up	Third place	Ref.
Domestic	Gamma Ethniki (Third-tier)	0			2024–25 (Group 4)	
Domestic	Delta Ethniki (Fourth-tier)	0			2007–08 (Group 8), 2008–09 (Group 8), 2009–10 (Group 8)	
Regional	Athens FCA First Division	1	2023–24 (Group 2)			
Regional	Athens FCA Second Division	1	1963–64			
Regional	Athens FCA Cup	1	2023–24	2006–07		

A.O. Nea Ionia W.F.C. honours
Type	Competition	Titles	Winners	Runners-up	Third place	Ref.
Domestic	Beta Ethniki (Second-tier)	1	2001–02 (Group 3)			

A.O. Nea Ionia Youth F.C. honours
Type	Competition	Titles	Winners	Runners-up	Third place	Ref.
Regional	U17 Athens FCA Youth League	1	2024–25			

- record
- ^{S} Shared record

== Domestic performance ==
=== Season by season in the higher divisions ===
Season	Category	Position	Points	GF \ GA	Cup	Ref.
2003–04	Delta Ethniki (Group 8)	7th	44	43—33	—	
2004–05	Delta Ethniki (Group 9)	5th	44	30—25	—	
2005–06	Delta Ethniki (Group 8)	5th	44	61—26	—	
2006–07	Delta Ethniki (Group 8)	7th	42	43—36	—	
2007–08	Delta Ethniki (Group 8)	**3rd**	49	54—26	—	
2008–09	Delta Ethniki (Group 8)	**3rd**	51	51—23	—	
2009–10	Delta Ethniki (Group 8)	**3rd**	61	69—28	—	
2010–11	Delta Ethniki (Group 8)	8th	35	32—40	—	
2011–12	Delta Ethniki (Group 8)	6th	43	35—21	—	
2012–13	Delta Ethniki (Group 8)	4th	34	24—17	—	
2013–14	Gamma Ethniki (Group 5)	6th	45	38—21	1R	
2014–15	Gamma Ethniki (Group 4)	13th (R)	27	28—38	1R	
2024–25	Gamma Ethniki (Group 4)	**3rd**	67	54—25	4R	
2025–26	Gamma Ethniki (Group 5)	8th	37	28—30	—	
2026–27	Gamma Ethniki (Group 9)	TBD	—	—	—	

The best result is highlighted in bold.

Key: 1R = First Round, 2R = Second Round, 3R = Third Round, 4R = Fourth Round, 5R = Fifth Round, GS = Group Stage, R16 = Round of 16, QF = Quarter-finals, SF = Semi-finals, C = Champion, P = Promotion, R = Relegation.

=== Greek Cup campaigns ===
Season	Round	Venue	Opponent	Home	Away	Qual.	Ref.
1940–41	First Round	AEK Stadium	Α.Ε. Ierapoli	4–2 (a.e.t.)	–		
1940–41	Cancelled due to the Greco-Italian War						
1941–44	Not held due to the German invasion of Greece						
1946–47	First Round	AEK Stadium	Proodos Patisia	–	1–0		
1947–48	First Round	–	Pantzitzifiakos	2–0 (w/o)	–		
1947–48	Second Round	AEK Stadium	Ionikos Nea Filadelfeia	3–0	–		
1947–48	Third Round	Nea Ionia Municipal Stadium	A.P.O. Attikos	–	2–1		
1948–49	First Round	AEK Stadium	Proodos Patisia	3–2	–		
1948–49	Second Round	AEK Stadium	A.P.O. Attikos	–	4–1		
1949–50	First Round	Rizoupoli Stadium	Kronos Athens	6–1	–		
1949–50	Second Round	Rizoupoli Stadium	Apollon Smyrnis	–	1–0		
1950–51	First Round	AEK Stadium	Afovos	4–0	–		
1950–51	Second Round	Rizoupoli Stadium	Aiolikos Tzitzifies	1–0	–		
1950–51	Third Round	Rizoupoli Stadium	Apollon Smyrnis	–	2–1		
1951–52	First Round	AEK Stadium	Akratitos Petralona	1–0	–		
1951–52	Second Round	AEK Stadium	Fostiras	–	2–0		
1953–54	First Round	Rizoupoli Stadium	P.A.O. Kalogreza	–	1–0		
1955–56	First Round	Rizoupoli Stadium	Thyella Peristeri	–	4–2		
2024–25	First Round	–	Bye	–	–	–	
2024–25	Second Round	Afantou Municipal Stadium	A.E.R. Afantou	–	0–1 (a.e.t.)		
2024–25	Third Round	Ag. Anargyroi Municipal Stadium	Anagennisi Arta	1–0	–		
2024–25	Fourth Round	Spyros Gialampidis Stadium	Panionios	–	0–0 (2–1 p)		

=== Overall record in major competitions ===
Competition	Total							
Competition	Pld	W	D	L	GF	GA	GD	Win%
Gamma Ethniki	112	49	29	34	148	114	+34	43.75
Greek Cup	19	10	0	9	32	24	+8	52.63
Gamma Ethniki Cup	4	2	0	2	8	8	+0	50.00
Total	**135**	**61**	**29**	**45**	**188**	**146**	**+42**	**45.19**

Last updated: 14 May 2026.
Source: epo.gr

- Matches are classified as home or away depending on the team's allocation established after the Hellenic Football Federation's competition draw. Home and away games may not always take place at the designated home venue of the respective team.

== Performance against higher-profile clubs ==
Season	Competition	Round	Opponent	Home	Away	Ref.
1949–50	Greek Cup	Second Round	Apollon Smyrnis	–	1–0	
1950–51	Greek Cup	Third Round	Apollon Smyrnis	–	2–1	
1951–52	Greek Cup	Second Round	Fostiras	–	2–0	
2013–14	Gamma Ethniki	Matchday 1 & 16	Ethnikos Asteras	3–0	0–2	
2013–14	Gamma Ethniki	Matchday 2 & 17	Kissamikos	0–0	0–1	
2013–14	Gamma Ethniki	Matchday 6 & 21	Panelefsiniakos	1–2	1–0	
2013–14	Gamma Ethniki	Matchday 7 & 22	Ionikos	2–3	1–0	
2013–14	Gamma Ethniki	Matchday 9 & 24	Proodeftiki	2–0	1–1	
2013–14	Gamma Ethniki	Matchday 14 & 29	Giouchtas	0–0	1–0	
2013–14	Gamma Ethniki	Matchday 15 & 30	Doxa Vyrona	1–0	1–1	
2013–14	Gamma Ethniki Cup	First Round	Giouchtas	0–0 (4–3 p)		
2013–14	Gamma Ethniki Cup	Second Round	Olympiakos Laurium		2–1	
2014–15	Gamma Ethniki	Matchday 1 & 14	Kissamikos	1–1	3–1	
2014–15	Gamma Ethniki	Matchday 2 & 15	Ilisiakos	1–0	1–1	
2014–15	Gamma Ethniki	Matchday 4 & 16	Ethnikos Piraeus	1–1	1–0	
2014–15	Gamma Ethniki	Matchday 7 & 20	Ionikos	1–0	3–0	
2014–15	Gamma Ethniki	Matchday 9 & 22	Kifisia	1–1	2–1	
2014–15	Gamma Ethniki	Matchday 11 & 24	Giouchtas	1–1	2–1	
2014–15	Gamma Ethniki Cup	First Round	Kissamikos		1–3	
2014–15	Gamma Ethniki Cup	Second Round	Ethnikos Piraeus		2–0	
2024–25	Gamma Ethniki	Matchday 1 & 17	Ethnikos Piraeus	1–1	3–1	
2024–25	Gamma Ethniki	Matchday 2 & 18	Marko	1–1	1–1	
2024–25	Gamma Ethniki	Matchday 3 & 19	Giouchtas	3–0	1–2	
2024–25	Gamma Ethniki	Matchday 4 & 20	Agios Nikolaos	2–0	1–0	
2024–25	Gamma Ethniki	Matchday 16 & 32	Ilisiakos	0–3	0–2	
2024–25	Greek Cup	Third Round	Anagennisi Arta	1–0	–	
2024–25	Greek Cup	Fourth Round	Panionios	–	0–0 (2–1 p)	
2025–26	Gamma Ethniki	Matchday 2 & 13	Diagoras Rodos	1–1	3–0	
2025–26	Gamma Ethniki	Matchday 7 & 18	Doxa Vyrona	0–1	0–1	

- Matches are classified as home or away depending on the team's allocation established after the Hellenic Football Federation's competition draw. Home and away games may not always take place at the designated home venue of the respective team.

== Players ==
=== Current squad ===
As of 12 September 2026

Note: Flags indicate national team as defined under FIFA eligibility rules; some limited exceptions apply. Players may hold more than one non-FIFA nationality.

No.	Pos.	Nation	Player
1	GK	GRE	Nikhtas Lourakis
2	GK	GRE	Gleb Nesposudniy
3	GK	GRE	Theodoros Stergiotis
4	DF	GRE	Pantelis Papazisis
5	DF	GRE	Marios Mpinatsis
6	DF	CMR	Marechal Bao Boweye
7	DF	GRE	Eftychios Spanos
8	DF	GRE	Dimitris Polyzois
9	DF	GRE	Athanasios Mauromatis
10	DF	GRE	Efstathios Chatzimarkos
11	DF	GRE	Alexis Koutsias
12	DF	GRE	Angelos Tasioulis

No.	Pos.	Nation	Player
13	DF	GRE	Giannis Prionas
14	MF	GRE	Anastasios Veletakos
15	MF	GRE	Georgios Petsitis
16	MF	GRE	Alexandros Krushelnytsky
17	MF	GRE	Mateo Bineri
18	MF	GRE	Alexandro Shaholli
19	MF	GRE	Thiseas Kapsalis
20	FW	GRE	Georgios Pachos
21	FW	GRE	Nikolaos Ilaos Iliopoulos
22	FW	GRE	Giannis Tsakiris
23	FW	GRE	Kuriakos Mastorakis
24	FW	GRE	Aggelos Fotopoulos

== Notable former coaches ==
Greece

- (Greece) Giannis Petrakis (2009–10)
- (Greece) (Cape Verde) Daniel Batista (2008–09)
- (Greece) Isidoros Stavrianos (2023–26)

Asia

- (Armenia) (Greece) Murat Seropian (2007)

== List of former and current players ==
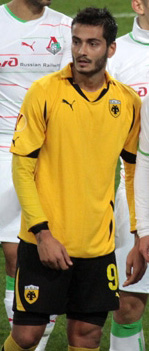
Savvas Gentsoglou

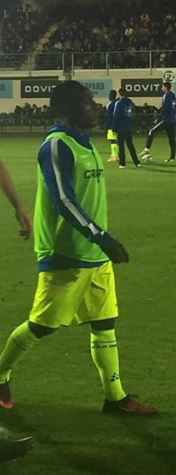
Stallone Limbombe

Greece

- (Greece) Mimis Anastasiadis (1951–56)
- (Greece) Antonis Panagiotopoulos (2004–06)
- (Greece) Georgios Iordanidis (2006–07)
- (Greece) Vasilios Vallianos (2007–08)
- (Greece) Dimitrios Mouroutis (2007–08)
- (Greece) Vangelis Kefalas (2008)
- (Greece) Savvas Gentsoglou (2008)
- (Greece) Xenofon Panos (2008–09)
- (Greece) Lefteris Velentzas (2008–09)
- (Greece) Diamantis Athanasiou (2008–10)
- (Greece) Dimitrios Ziogas (2009)
- (Greece) Theopistos Papadopoulos (2009–10)
- (Greece) Periklis Minas (2009–10)
- (Greece) Stamatis Kalamiotis (2009–10)
- (Greece) Nikos Moustakis (2009–10, 2012–13)
- (Greece) (Nigeria) Marios Ogkmpoe (2009–15)
- (Greece) Georgios Provatas (2010–11)
- (Greece) Ahmet Satzit (2010–15, 2021–22)
- (Greece) Isidoros Chalimourdas (2011–12)
- (Greece) Georgios Vidalis (2011–13)
- (Greece) Prokopis Saganas (2012–13)
- (Greece) Kleopas Giannou (2013–14)
- (Greece) Viktoras Plantzos (2013–14)
- (Greece) (Georgia (country)) Michalis Tsamourlidis (2013–14)
- (Greece) Panagiotis Karachalios (2013–15)
- (Greece) Georgios Barkoglou (2014–15)
- (Greece) Giannis Chloros (2014–15)
- (Greece) Alexandros Karachalios (2014–15)
- (Greece) Antonis Lykouris (2022)
- (Greece) (Albania) Enias Kalogeris (2021–23)
- (Greece) Vangelis Platellas (2023–26)
- (Greece) (Albania) Oresti Xhamaj (2024)
- (Greece) Panagiotis Georgeas (2024–25)
- (Greece) (Russia) Georgios Droznt (2024–25)
- (Greece) (United States) Alexandros Lafkas (2024–25)
- (Greece) Nikos Dimitriadis (2025)
- (Greece) (Albania) Rey Rokaj (2025–26)
- (Greece) (Ukraine) Alexandros Krushelnytsky (2026–)
- (Greece) Alexis Koutsias (2026–)

Rest of Europe

- (Albania) Flosard Malçi (2013–14)
- (Albania) (Greece) Eralb Sinani (2014–15)
- (Belgium) (Democratic Republic of the Congo) Stallone Limbombe (2024–25)
- (England) Daniel Jackson (2024)
- (Portugal) (Cape Verde) Fabio Tavares (2023–24)
- (Portugal) (Guinea-Bissau) Sandro Semedo (2024)
- (Romania) Razvan Anechitei (2023)

Africa

- (Cameroon) (Greece) Jacques Alberto Ngwem (2025–26)
- (Cameroon) Marechal Bao Boweye (2026–)
- (Guinea) Sekouba Fofana (2024–25)
- (Ivory Coast) Lucien Koudou (2020, 2022–23)
- (Ivory Coast) Louis Bessou Gbassale (2021)
- (Mali) Ousmane Cisse (2021–22)
- (Mauritania) (France) Khassa Camara (2025–26)
- (Senegal) Ismaila Demba (2024)

Americas

- (Brazil) (Greece) Paolo Farinola (2020)
- (Brazil) Fernandinho (2023–24)
- (Brazil) Luisinho (2024–25)
- (Colombia) Teobaldo Martínez (2023)
- (Uruguay) Agustín Liucci Quintana (2022)
- (United States) (Greece) Andreas Chronis (2007–09, 2012–13)

Asia

- (Armenia) (Greece) Murat Seropian (2004–06)
- (Cyprus) Michael Odysseos (2024–25)
- (Russia) (Greece) Gleb Nesposudniy (2026–)

== Personnel ==
=== Current Board ===
Position	Staff
President	(Greece) Theodoros Douridas
Vice President A	(Greece) Tilemachos Manousaridis
Vice President B	(Greece) Fotis Tsapras
General Secretary	(Greece) Christos Gribas
Special Secretary	(Greece) Konstantinos Bambakopooulos
Financial Officer	Vacant
General Manager	(Greece) Makis Elmaloglou
Team Manager	(Greece) Georgios Choulis
Board Member	(Greece) Anastasios Theodoridis

== Kit providers and sponsors ==
Updated 30 May 2026

Kit manufacturer	Period	Shirt Sponsors	Period
(Germany) Puma	2012–15	(Greece) ASEPTA	2012–15
(Austria) Tempo	2016–17	(Greece) Amilla	2016–17
(Italy) Givova	2019–21	(Greece) GREENIOLA	–
(Spain) Luanvi	2021–22	(Greece) Geuseis sth ladokola	2021–22
(Italy) Zeus	2022–24	–	–
(Spain) Luanvi	2024–	(Greece) Amilla (Greece) Ta Gioulia (Greece) Vikos	?–2025 ?–2026; 2026–

== Bibliography ==
- Howland, Charles P. (1926). L'Établissement des Réfugiés en Grèce. Avec 67 illustrations une carte d'établissement des réfugiés ruraux et urbains et une carte ethnographiques de la Macédoine (in French). Genève, Suisse: Société des Nations.
- Νικολαΐδης, Νίκος Δ. (2012). Απ΄τη Γ΄Εθνική στο Περιφερειακό, 1965-2012 (in Greek). Αθήνα, Ελλάδα. ISBN 9786188004801.
- Σαπουντζάκης, Χάρης; Χριστοδούλου, Λουκάς (2013). Η ΝΕΑ ΙΩΝΙΑ ΣΤΟ ΜΕΣΟΠΟΛΕΜΟ 1922-1941 (in Greek). Αθήνα, Ελλάδα: Εκδόσεις Ένωσης Σπάρτης Μ. Ασίας. ISBN 9789609592017.
- Χριστοδούλου, Λουκάς (2014). Η ιστορία των σωματείων της Νέας Ιωνίας: Από την ίδρυση της πόλης έως τη Μεταπολίτευση 1923-1974 (in Greek). Γλύφα Βαρθολομιού Ηλείας, Ελλάδα: Εκδόσεις Μπαλτά. ISBN 9789609953290.
- Μπαλτάς, Ανδρέας (2022). Προσφυγικά Αθλητικά Σωματεία στον Μεσοπόλεμο 1922-1940 (in Greek). Γλύφα Βαρθολομιού Ηλείας, Ελλάδα: Εκδόσεις Μπαλτά. ISBN 9786185658014.
- Χριστοδούλου, Λουκάς (2022). Από τους Ποδαράδες 1922...Στη Νέα Ιωνία 1934...: Η Προσφυγική Πρωτεύουσα της Αθήνας (in Greek). Γλύφα Βαρθολομιού Ηλείας, Ελλάδα: Εκδόσεις Μπαλτά. ISBN 9786185658007.
