= Ilion, Greece =

Ilion Ίλιον
- Municipality
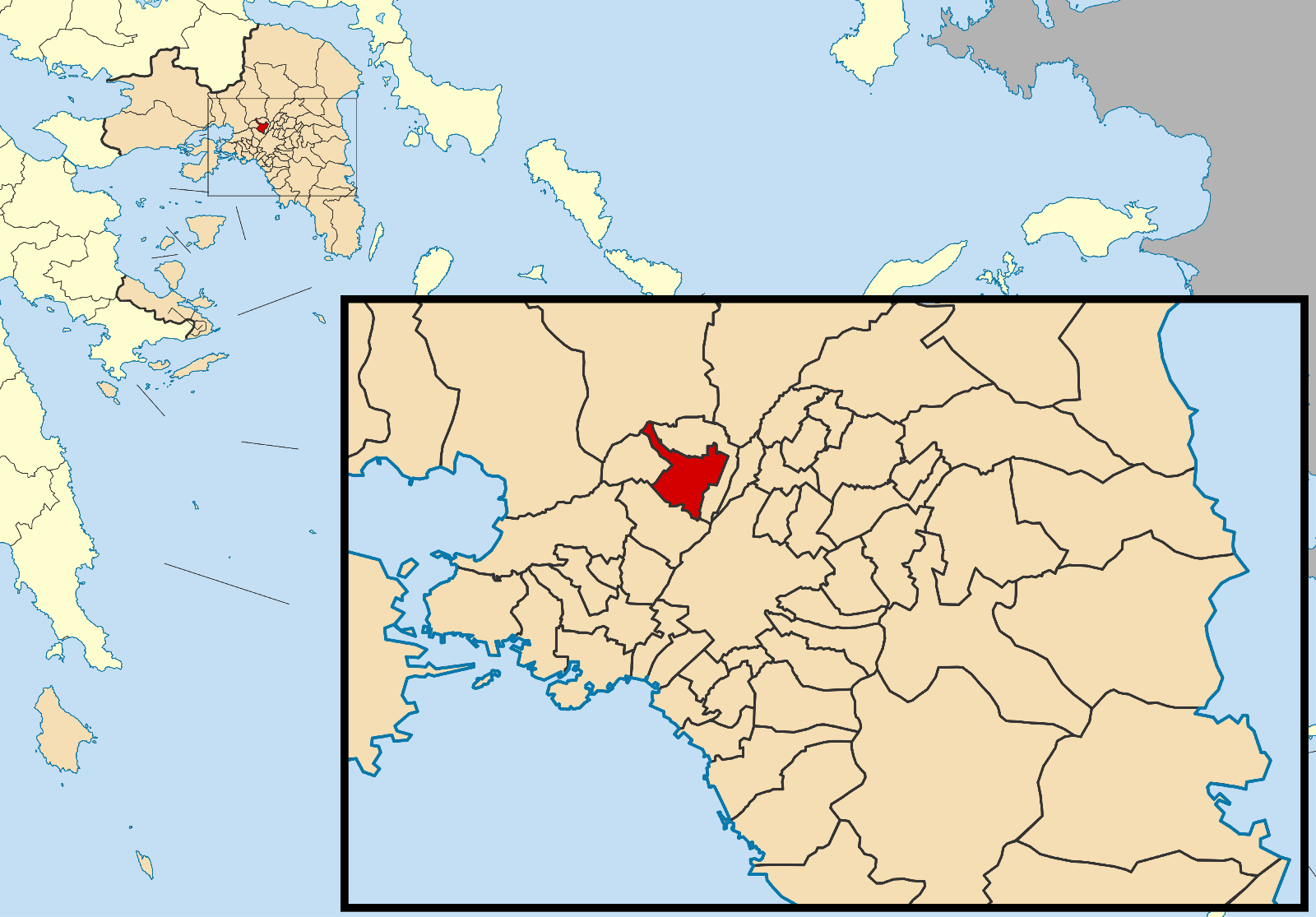

- Location within Greece
- Coordinates: 38°2′N 23°42′E
- Country: Greece
- Administrative region: Attica
- Regional unit: West Athens

Government
  - Mayor: Andriana Alevizou (since 2023)

Area
  - Municipality: 9.453 km^{2} (3.650 sq mi)
- Elevation: 150 m (490 ft)

Population (2021)
  - Municipality: 84,004
  - Density: 8,886/km^{2} (23,020/sq mi)
- Time zone: UTC+2 (EET)
  - Summer (DST): UTC+3 (EEST)
- Postal code: 131 xx, 133 xx
- Area code: 210
- Vehicle registration: IB
- Website: www.ilion.gr

Ilion (Greek: Ίλιον; before 1994: Νέα Λιόσια, Nea Liosia) is a town and a suburb in the western part of the Athens agglomeration, Greece.

== Geography ==
Ilion lies southeast of Mount Aigaleo, 6 km (4 mi) northwest of Athens. The municipal town has an area of 9.453 km^{2}. Neighbouring municipalities and towns are Agioi Anargyroi-Kamatero to the north and east, Petroupoli to the northwest, and Peristeri to the south. The main streets are Fylis Avenue, Thivon Avenue, Idomeneos Street, and Protesilaou Street.

== Sites of interest ==
- National Sports Center of Nea Liosia
- Antonis Tritsis Metropolitan Park
- Forklore Museum
- Cultural Center
- Mikis Theodorakis Multipurpose Center for Cultural, Sports, and Social Activities

== Historical population ==
Year	Population
1951	5,460
1961	31,810
1971	56,127
1981	72,427
1991	78,326
2001	80,859
2011	84,793
2021	84,004

== Sports ==
Ilion hosts many athletic clubs in several sports. Μost of them play in the amateur divisions. Presence or earlier presence in the higher divisions in their sport have the clubs Olympiakos Nea Liosia F.C. and Enosi Iliou.

Notable sport clubs based in Ilion
Club	Founded	Sports	Achievements
Olympiakos Nea Liosia	1952	Football	Earlier presence in Beta Ethniki
Enosi Iliou	2002	Basketball	Presence in Beta Ethniki, basketball

== International relations ==
Ilion, Greece is twinned with:

- Corigliano d'Otranto, Italy
- Tulcea, Romania
- Armilla, Spain
- Jericho, Palestine
