= Panagiotis Karachalios =

Greek footballer

Personal information
- Full name: Panagiotis Karachalios
- Date of birth: 4 November 1987 (age 38)
- Place of birth: Athens, Greece
- Height: 1.89 m (6 ft 2 1/2 in)
- Position: Winger

Team information
- Current team: Olympiakos Neon Liosion

Senior career*
Years	Team	Apps	(Gls)
2005–2007	Acharnaikos F.C.	30	(2)
2007–2008	Ethnikos Piraeus F.C.	17	(1)
2008–2009	Aias Salamina F.C.	29	(8)
2009	Panargiakos F.C.	12	(3)
2010	Aias Salamina F.C.	14	(3)
2010–2011	Ethnikos Piraeus F.C.	14	(1)
2011–2012	A.O. Glyfada F.C.	17	(9)
2012–2013	Paniliakos F.C.	13	(3)
2013–2015	A.O.Nea Ionia F.C	25	(8)
2015–2016	Ionikos F.C.		
2016	Olympiakos Agiou Stefanou		
2016–2017	A.E. Irakleio F.C		
2017–	Olympiakos Neon Liosion		
- * Club domestic league appearances and goals as of 20 April 2008 ‡ National team caps and goals as of 8 July 2007

Panagiotis Karachalios (Greek: Παναγιώτης Καραχάλιος; born 4 November 1987) is a Greek footballer who plays for Olympiakos Neon Liosion as a winger.

== Career ==
Born in Athens, Karachalios began playing football with Acharnaikos F.C. He also played for Ethnikos Piraeus F.C., Aias Salamina F.C., Panargiakos F.C., A.O. Glyfada F.C., and Paniliakos F.C.
