= Murat Seropian =

Armenian-Greek footballer and manager

Personal information
- Date of birth: 26 October 1970 (age 56)
- Position: Defender

Team information
- Current team: Olympiakos Nea Liosia (manager)

Senior career*
Years	Team	Apps	(Gls)
–1993	PAS Giannina		
1993–1995	Doxa Vyronas		
1995	Chania		
1996	Agios Nikolaos		
1996–1998	Doxa Vyronas		
1998–2000	Atromitos		
2000	Marko		
2001	Fostiras		
2001–2002	Panelefsiniakos		
2002	Vyzas		
2002–2004	Ermis Korydallos		
2004–2006	Nea Ionia		

Managerial career
- 2010–2011: Vyzas
- 2011: Panachaiki
- 2011–2012: Glyfada
- 2012–2014: Chania
- 2014–2015: Panegialios
- 2015: Ermionida
- 2015: OFI
- 2016: Chalkida
- 2017–2019: Atromitos (youth)
- 2019–2021: Ethnikos Piraeus
- 2021–2022: Panelefsiniakos
- 2022: Fostiras
- 2023–2024: Panelefsiniakos
- 2024–2025: Fostiras
- 2025–: Olympiakos Nea Liosia
- * Club domestic league appearances and goals

Murat Seropian (Greek: Μουράτ Σεροπιάν; born 26 October 1970) is an Armenian-Greek football manager and former player.
