= Giannis Chloros =

Greek footballer (born 1978)

Personal information
- Full name: Ioannis Chloros
- Date of birth: 30 October 1978 (age 47)
- Place of birth: Schwabach, Germany
- Height: 1.79 m (5 ft 10 1/2 in)
- Positions: Centre forward; winger

Youth career
- 1995: Panargiakos U21

Senior career*
Years	Team	Apps	(Gls)
1996	Panargiakos	0	(0)
1997	Athinaikos	0	(0)
1998–2000	Trikala	56	(11)
2000–2006	Egaleo	140	(19)
2006	AEL	17	(2)
2007–2008	Iraklis	24	(3)
2008–2009	Thrasyvoulos	23	(2)
2009–2011	Doxa Drama	62	(14)
2011–2012	Panachaiki	6	(0)
2012	Panthrakikos	13	(1)
2012–2013	Kavala	32	(6)
2013–2014	Anagennisi Karditsa	25	(4)
2014–2015	Nea Ionia	-	(–)

Managerial career
- 2021–2023: Haidari
- 2023: Egaleo (assistant manager)
- 2024–: Ifestos Peristeriou
- * Club domestic league appearances and goals as of 25 October 2024

Giannis Chloros (Greek: Γιάννης Χλωρός; born 30 October 1978) is a retired Greek footballer who works as a manager for Ifestos Peristeriou.

== Career ==
Born in Schwabach, Germany, Chloros moved to Greece where he began his professional career by signing for Panargiakos in July 1996. Following a few stints in the Beta Ethniki, he moved to Trikala F.C. where he appeared in 28 Alpha Ethniki matches during the 1999–00 season. He joined Egaleo F.C. in July 2000, and appeared in 137 Alpha Ethniki matches for the club over four and one-half seasons. He also played for AEL, Iraklis and Thrasyvoulos in the Alpha Ethniki. Lastly, he played for Nea Ionia football club in the Gamma Ethniki.
