= Panagiotis Georgeas =

Greek footballer

Personal information
- Full name: Panagiotis Georgeas
- Date of birth: 21 August 2003 (age 23)
- Place of birth: Greece
- Height: 1.82 m (5 ft 11 1/2 in)
- Position: Winger

Team information
- Current team: AS Panthouriakos

Youth career
- 2019–2021: AEK Athens

Senior career*
Years	Team	Apps	(Gls)
2021–2024	AEK Athens B	27	(2)
2024–2025	Diagoras	11	(0)
2025–2026	A.O. Nea Ionia	10	(0)
2026–2027	AS Panthouriakos	0	(0)

International career
2020	Greece U17	1	(0)
- * Club domestic league appearances and goals as of 3 August 2026

Panagiotis Georgeas (Greek: Παναγιώτης Γεωργέας; born 21 August 2003) is a Greek professional footballer who plays as a winger for Gamma Ethniki club AS Panthouriakos.

== Personal life ==
Georgeas is the son of former professional footballer Nikolaos.
