= Christos Lelekas =

Greek footballer

Personal information
- Date of birth: 19 December 2003 (age 22)
- Place of birth: Heraklion, Crete, Greece
- Height: 1.74 m (5 ft 9 in)
- Position: Midfielder

Team information
- Current team: AEL
- Number: 19

Youth career
- OFI

Senior career*
Years	Team	Apps	(Gls)
2022–2024	AEK Athens B	12	(0)
2024–2025	Kavala	25	(1)
2025–2026	Nestos Chrysoupoli	26	(6)
2026–	AEL	1	(0)
- * Club domestic league appearances and goals as of 21 September 2026

Christos Lelekas (Greek: Χρήστος Λέλεκας; born 19 December 2003) is a Greek professional footballer who plays as a midfielder for Super League 2 club AEL.
