= Epirus Football Clubs Association =

Association football governing body in Ioannina Prefecture, Greece

- Full name: Epirus Football Clubs Association; Greek: Ένωση Ποδοσφαιρικών Σωματείων Ηπείρου
- Short name: Macedonia F.C.A.; Greek: Ε.Π.Σ. Ηπείρου
- Founded: 1952; 74 years ago
- Headquarters: Ioannina, Greece
- FIFA affiliation: Hellenic Football Federation
- President: Konstantinos Vrakas
- Website: epsip.gr

Epirus Football Clubs Association (Greek: Ένωση Ποδοσφαιρικών Σωματείων Ηπείρου) is an association football organization in Ioannina Prefecture that is part of Hellenic Football Federation. It was founded in 1952 and its main headquarters are in the city of Ioannina.

== History ==
It was founded in 1952. Members included teams from the prefectures of Ioannina, Arta, Preveza, Lefkada, Aetolia-Acarnania (Vonitsa). Arta established its own Football Clubs Association in 1981, Preveza and Lefkada in 1981. Also there were clubs from Thesprotia, Corfu, Grevena.

== Organization ==
The association is a member of the Hellenic Football Federation and organizes a regional football league and cup.

== List of Champions ==
	Team	
1952-53	Not held	
1953-54	AO Panamvrakikos Arta	
1954-55	N:Atromitos Ioannina S:Tilikratis Lefkada	Atromitos Ioannina
1955-56	AO Panamvrakikos Arta	
1956-57	Atromitos Ioannina	
1957-58	PAS Averof	
1958-59	PAS Averof	
1959-60	PAS Averof	
1960-61	PAS Averof	
1961-62	PAS Averof	
1962-63	Nikopoli Preveza	
1963-64	Anagennisi Arta	
1964-65	AO Ioannina	
1965-66	AO Amvrakia Kostakioi	
1966-67	Panlefkadios	
1967-68	PAS Preveza	
1968-69	Anagennisi Arta	
1969-70	Foinikas Lefkada	
1970-71	PAS Preveza	
1971-72	PAS Preveza	
1972-73	PAS Preveza	
1973-74	N:AO Anatolis S:PAS Preveza	
1974-75	Ν:Thyella Katsikas S:Tilikratis Lefkada	
1975-76	N:Atromitos Ioannina S:Anagennisi Arta	
1976-77	N:Proodeftiki Perama S:PAS Preveza	
1977-78	N:Ampelokipoi Ioannina S:Skoufas Kompoti	Ampelokipoi Ioannina
1978-79	N1:Thyella Katsikas N2:Atromitos Ioannina S1:PAS Preveza S2:Amvrakikos	PAS Preveza
1979-80	N:Thyella Katsikas S:Amvrakikos	
1980-81	N:Thyella Katsikas S:Proodeftiki Grammenitsa	
1981-82	Atromitos Ioannina	
1982-83	Ampelokipoi Ioannina	
1983-84	Stavraetos Sirrako	
1984-85	Proodeftiki Perama	
1985-86	AO Anatoli	
1986-87	Proodeftiki Perama	
1987-88	1st:Thyella Eleousa 2nd:AO Anatoli	Thyella Eleousa
1988-89	1st:Proodeftiki Perama 2nd:Thyella Katsika	Proodeftiki Perama
1989-90	1st:Pindos Konitsa 2nd:AO Anatoli	
1990-91	Ethnikos Ioannina	
1991-92	AO Kontsika	
1992-93	Ampelokipoi Ioannina	
1993-94	Pindos Konitsa	
1994-95	AO Kontsika	
1995-96	Thyella Eleousa	
1996-97	Olympiakos Votanikos	
1997-98	Passaron Rodotopi	
1998-99	AO Anatoli	
1999-00	AO Anatoli	
2000-01	Aetos Petsali	
2001-02	AO Anatoli	
2002-03	Thyella Katsikas	
2003-04	Doxa Kranoula	
2004-05	Stavraetos Sirrako	
2005-06	Thyella Katsikas	
2006-07	Proodeftiki Perama	
2007-08	Pindos Konitsa	
2008-09	Proodeftiki Perama	
2009-10	Thyella Eleousa	
2010-11	Pindos Konitsa	
2011-12	PAO Kria	
2012-13	AO Velissario	
2013-14	AO Anatoli	
2014-15	AO Velissario	
2015-16	AO Velissario	
2016-17	Doxa Kranoula	
2017-18	Thriamvos Serviana	
2018-19	AO Anatoli	
2019-20	Thyella Katsikas	
2020-21	Abandoned	
2021-22	Thyella Katsikas	
2022-23	Thyella Katsikas	
2023-24	Thyella Eleousa	
2024-25	Thyella Eleousa	
2025-26	Thyella Katsikas	

== Cup ==
The Epirus FCA Cup is a football competition in which the clubs competing in any of the Epirus FCA Football Leagues participate.

=== List of Epirus FCA Cup Finals ===
Season	Clubs	Score	Ground	Source
1971-72	Thyella Katsikas-PAS Preveza	1-0		
1972-73	Thyella Katsikas-Diagoras Kommeno Arta	4-4 (5-4 et)		
1973-74	Foinikas Lefkada-Thyella Katsikas	1-1 (3-2 et)		
1974-75	Thyella Katsikas-Tilikratis Lefkada	1-1 (1-1 et 5-4 pen)		
1975-76	Anagennisi Arta-Thyella Katsikas	3-0		
1976-77	PAS Preveza-Proodeftiki Perama	3-1		
1977-78	Anagennisi Arta-Thyella Katsikas	2-1		
1978-79	Proodeftiki Perama-PAS Preveza	0-0 (1-0 et)		
1979-80	Amvrakikos Vonitsa-AO Anatoli	0-1		
1980-81	AO Anatoli-Achilleas Neochori	3-1		
1981-82	Thyella Katsikas-PAO Penteli	5-0		
1982-83	Thyella Eleousa-AO Anatoli	1-1 (1-1 et 4-5 pen)		
1983-84	Thyella Katsikas-PAO Penteli	3-1		
1984-85	AO Pedini-Thyella Katsikas	0-3		
1985-86	Stavraetos Sirrako-Thyella Katsikas	2-2 (3-3 et 2-4 pen)		
1986-87	PAS Giannina (Amateurs)-Pindos Konitsa	2-0		
1987-88	Thyella Eleousa-AO Velissario	1-0		
1988-89	Proodeftiki Perama-Thyella Katsikas	1-0		
1989-90	Proodeftiki Perama-AO Velissario	3-2		
1990-91	PAS Giannina (Amateurs)-AO Kontsika	5-0		
1991-92	AO Stavraki-Olympiakos Votanikos	0-0 (3-0 et)		
1992-93	Thyella Katsikas-AO Velissario	2-1		
1993-94	Thyella Eleousa-Proodeftiki Perama	2-1		
1994-95	Pindos Konitsa-AO Kontsika	4-1		
1995-96	Thyella Eleousa-AO Stavraki	1-0		
1996-97	AO Anatoli-Passaron Rodotopi	1-0		
1997-98	Proodeftiki Perama-AE Pramanta	4-0		
1998-99	PAO Kria-AO Anatoli	0-3		
1999-00	Passaron Rodotopi-AO Anatoli	3-1		
2000-01	Aetos Petsali-Aetos Charokopi	4-0		
2001-02	PAS Averof-Olympiakos Votanikos	4-1		
2002-03	Olympiakos Votanikos-Passaron Rodotopi	0-2		
2003-04	PAS Averof-Passaron Rodotopi	2-0	Zosimades stadium	
2004-05	AO Anatoli-AE Giannena	1-2	Zosimades stadium	
2005-06	Doxa Kranoula-Stavraetos Sirrako	5-2		
2006-07	AO Anatoli-Stavraetos Sirrako	0-1		
2007-08	AO Anatoli-Aetos Charokopi	3-1		
2008-09	Thyella Eleousa-AE Mikrasiates	1-1 (1-1 et 3-2 pen)		
2009-10	Proodeftiki Perama-AE Mikrasiates	1-1 (1-3 et)		
2010-11	Thyella Eleousa-AE Mikrasiates	1-2		
2011-12	PAS Almiros Vounoplagia-AO Pedini	1-1 (1-1 et 3-2 pen)	Zosimades stadium	
2012-13	PAS Almiros Vounoplagia-AO Anatoli	1-3	Zosimades stadium	
2013-14	Pindos Konitsa-AO Anatoli	2-2 (2-2 et 6-5 pen)	Zosimades stadium	
2014-15	Proodeftiki Perama-AE Chouliarades	1-2	Zosimades stadium	
2015-16	AO Anatoli-PAS Giannina U-20	0-0 (0-0 et 3-2 pen)	Zosimades stadium	
2016-17	PAS Giannina U-20-AO Ampelokipoi	0-0 (1-0 et)	Anatoli stadium	
2017-18	Thriamvos Serviana-Agrotikos Asteras Ano Kalama	1-0	Zosimades stadium	
2018-19	Thriamvos Serviana-AE Mikrasiates	2-0	Zosimades stadium	
2019-20	Abandoned	-		
2020-21	Abandoned	-		
2021-22	PAO Koutselio-PAS Krapsi	0-1	Zosimades stadium	
2022-23	Thyella Katsikas-Thyella Eleousa	1-0	Zosimades stadium	
2023-24	Thyella Katsikas-Thyella Eleousa	5-2	Zosimades stadium	
2024-25	Thyella Katsikas-Agrotikos Kastritsa	1-1 (1-1 et 4-1 pen)	Zosimades stadium	
2025-26	Thyella Katsikas-AE Giannena	1-1 (1-1 et 3-2 pen)	Zosimades stadium	

PAS Averof on seasons 2001-02 and 2003-04 was the previous renamed Aetos Petsali.

=== Performance by Club ===
Club	Titles	Runner-up	Years (Titles)	Years (Runner-up)
Thyella Katsikas	12	4	1972, 1973, 1975, 1982, 1984, 1985, 1986, 1993, 2023, 2024, 2025, 2026	1974, 1976, 1978, 1989
AO Anatoli	8	4	1980, 1981, 1983, 1997, 1999, 2008, 2013, 2016	2000, 2005, 2007, 2014
Proodeftiki Perama	4	4	1979, 1989, 1990, 1998	1977, 1994, 2010, 2015
Thyella Eleousa	4	4	1988, 1994, 1996, 2009	1983, 2011, 2023, 2024
PAS Giannina	3	1	1987, 1991, 2017	2016
Aetos Petsali	3	-	2001, 2002, 2004	-
Passaron Rodotopi	2	2	2000, 2003	1997, 2004
AE Mikrasiates	2	2	2010, 2011	2009, 2019
Pindos Konitsa	2	1	1995, 2014	1987
Anagennisi Arta	2	-	1976, 1978	-
Thriamvos Serviana	2	-	2018, 2019	-
PAS Preveza	1	2	1977	1972, 1979
Stavraetos Sirrako	1	2	2007	1986, 2006
Tilikratis Lefkada	1	1	1974	1975
AO Stavraki	1	1	1992	1996
PAS Almiros Vounoplagia	1	1	2012	2013
AE Giannena	1	1	2005	2026
Doxa Kranoula	1	-	2006	-
PAS Krapsi	1	-	2022	-
AO Velissario	-	3	-	1988, 1990, 1993
Olympiakos Votanikos	-	3	-	1992, 2002, 2003
PAO Penteli	-	2	-	1982, 1984
AO Kontsika	-	2	-	1991, 1995
Aetos Charokopi	-	2	-	2001, 2008
AO Pedini	-	2	-	1985, 2012
Diagoras Kommeno Arta	-	1	-	1973
Amvrakikos Vonitsa	-	1	-	1980
Achilleas Neochori	-	1	-	1981
AE Pramanta	-	1	-	1998
PAO Kria	-	1	-	1999
AE Chouliarades	-	1	-	2015
AO Ampelokipoi	-	1	-	2017
Agrotikos Asteras Ano Kalama	-	1	-	2018
PAO Koutselio	-	1	-	2022
Agrotikos Kastritsa	-	1	-	2025

On 1974 as Foinikas Lefkada

On 2002 and 2004 as PAS Averof.

== Super Cup ==
The Epirus FCA Super Cup is a football one match competition, which is contested annually by the Epirus A Division champion, and the winner of the Epirus FCA Cup.

=== The matches ===
Season	Teams	Score
2013	AO Velissario-AO Anatoli	1-3
2014	Pindos Konitsa-AO Anatoli	0-1
2015	AE Chouliarades-AO Velissario	0-1
2016	AO Anatoli-AO Velissario	1-0
2017	Doxa Kranoula-PAS Giannina (U-20)	2-1
2018	Thriamvos Serviana-Agrotikos Asteras Ano Kalama	1-1 (6-7 pen)
2022	PAS Krapsi-Thyella Katsikas	2-0

=== Performance by Club ===
Club	Titles	Runner-up	Years (Titles)	Years (Runner-up)
AO Anatoli	3	-	2013, 2014, 2016	-
AO Velissario	1	2	2015	2013, 2016
Doxa Kranoula	1	-	2017	-
Agrotikos Asteras Ano Kalama	1	-	2018	-
PAS Krapsi	1	-	2022	-
Pindos Konitsa	-	1	-	2014
AE Chouliarades	-	1	-	2015
PAS Giannina	-	1	-	2017
Thriamvos Serviana	-	1	-	2018
Thyella Katsikas	-	1	-	2022

== Epirus FCA clubs in National divisions ==
Club	First Division (Since 1959-60)	Second Division (Since 1962-63)	Third Division (Since 1965-66)	Fourth Division (Since 1982-83)	2025-26
PAS Giannina	28	29	3	0	Super League 2
Anagennisi Arta*	0	10	5	0	-
PAS Averof	0	4	0	0	-
PAS Preveza*	0	2	5	0	-
AO Ioannina	0	1	0	0	-
AO Bizani	0	1	0	0	-
Doxa Kranoula	0	0	6	5	-
AO Velissario	0	0	3	2	Epirus FCA B Division
AE Giannena	0	0	3	2	Epirus FCA B Division
Thyella Katsikas	0	0	2	14	Epirus FCA A Division
Proodeftiki Perama	0	0	1	9	Epirus FCA B Division
Ampelokipoi Ioannina	0	0	1	2	Epirus FCA A Division
Thriamvos Serviana	0	0	1	0	-
AO Amvrakia Kostakioi*	0	0	1	0	-
Tilikratis Lefkada*	0	0	1	0	-
AO Anatoli	0	0	0	15	Epirus FCA A Division
Thyella Eleousa	0	0	0	10	Epirus FCA A Division
Passaron Rodotopi	0	0	0	6	Epirus FCA C Division
Olympiakos Votanikos	0	0	0	5	-
AO Kontsika	0	0	0	3	-
PAS Averof 2001	0	0	0	3	-
Stavraetos Sirrako	0	0	0	3	Epirus FCA B Division
Pindos Konitsa	0	0	0	3	Epirus FCA A Division
AO Stavraki	0	0	0	2	Epirus FCA B Division
Atromitos	0	0	0	1	-
Ethnikos Ioannina	0	0	0	1	-
Titan Logades	0	0	0	1	Epirus FCA A Division

*Until season 1980–81

PAS Averof 2001 is the renamed Aetos Petsali

== Presidential history ==
The presidential history of Epirus FCA.

President	
Athanasios Fotiadis	1952-1958
Georgios Georgiadis	1958-1961
Panagiotis Koltsidas	1961-1962
Periklis Giannis	1962-1963
Xenofon Kontouris	1963-1973
Theodoros Georgiadis	1973-1976
Xenofon Kontouris	1976-1992
Vasilis Mantzios	1992-2014
Kostas Vrakas	2014-
