= Theodoros Loukas =

Greek footballer

Personal information
- Full name: Theodoros Loukas
- Date of birth: 22 September 1999 (age 27)
- Place of birth: Trikala, Greece
- Height: 1.81 m (5 ft 11 in)
- Position: Midfielder

Team information
- Current team: Trikala

Youth career
- –2015: AE Trikala
- 2015–2017: AEK Athens

Senior career*
Years	Team	Apps	(Gls)
2017–2018	Apollon Larissa	4	(0)
2018–2019	Anagennisi Karditsa	12	(0)
2019	Almyros	10	(0)
2019–2020	Meteora		
2020–2022	Apollon Larissa	23	(0)
2022–2023	Trikala	0	(0)
2023–2024	Panegialios		
2024–	Trikala	0	(0)
- * Club domestic league appearances and goals as of 14 November 2021

Theodoros Loukas (Greek: Θεόδωρος Λούκας; born 22 September 1999) is a Greek professional footballer who plays as a midfielder for Trikala.
