= Giannis Varkas =

Greek footballer

Personal information
- Full name: Ioannis Varkas
- Date of birth: 27 March 1998 (age 28)
- Place of birth: Chalcis, Greece
- Height: 1.78 m (5 ft 10 in)
- Position: Winger

Team information
- Current team: Athens Kallithea
- Number: 14

Youth career
- 2014–2018: Olympiacos

Senior career*
Years	Team	Apps	(Gls)
2018–2021	Apollon Smyrnis	36	(1)
2021–2022	Chania	28	(2)
2022–2023	Ilioupoli	23	(4)
2023–2026	Egaleo	67	(9)
2026–	Athens Kallithea	13	(1)

International career^{‡}
2014–2015	Greece U17	5	(1)
2019	Greece U21	3	(0)
- * Club domestic league appearances and goals as of 12 September 2026 ‡ National team caps and goals as of 31 January 2019

Giannis Varkas (Greek: Γιάννης Βάρκας; born 27 March 1998) is a Greek professional footballer who plays as a winger for Super League 2 club Athens Kallithea.

== Career ==
On 9 January 2026, he joined Athens Kallithea.
