= Wilson Chimeli =

Paraguayan footballer (born 1989)

Personal information
- Date of birth: 13 February 1989 (age 37)
- Place of birth: Paraguay
- Height: 1.85 m (6 ft 1 in)
- Position: Forward

Team information
- Current team: APS Zakynthos
- Number: 26

Youth career
- Olimpia Itá

Senior career*
Years	Team	Apps	(Gls)
- Olimpia Itá
2018	River Plate	15	(5)
2018–2020	Real Pilar	52	(26)
2020	Deportivo Riestra	3	(0)
2021	Almirante Brown	31	(6)
2022–	APS Zakynthos	17	(8)
- * Club domestic league appearances and goals as of 18:06, 8 June 2022 (UTC)

Wilson Chimeli (born 13 February 1989) is a Paraguayan footballer who plays as a forward for APS Zakynthos.

== Career ==
In 2018, Chimeli signed for Argentine fifth division side Real Pilar after playing for River Plate (Asunción) in Paraguay, helping them reach the round of 16 of the 2018–19 Copa Argentina.

In 2020, he signed for Argentine second division club Deportivo Riestra.
