= Luisinho (footballer, born 1998) =

Brazilian footballer

Personal information
- Full name: Luis Carlos dos Santos Amorim
- Date of birth: 7 September 1998 (age 28)
- Place of birth: São Paulo, Brazil
- Height: 1.84 m (6 ft 0 in)
- Position: Midfielder

Youth career
- –2017: Corinthians
- 2018: Atibaia
- 2018: → Coimbra-MG (youth loan)

Senior career*
Years	Team	Apps	(Gls)
2019	América-RN	7	(1)
2020–2023	Oliveirense	31	(0)
2023	Flamurtari	12	(1)
2024	Gama		
2024–2025	Nea Ionia		
- * Club domestic league appearances and goals as of 14 September 2024

Luis Carlos dos Santos Amorim (born 7 September 1998), commonly known as Luisinho, is a Brazilian footballer who plays as a midfielder.

== Club career ==
In 2024, Luisinho secured a contract with AO Nea Ionia, a club playing in the third division of the Greek football league system.

== Career statistics ==
=== Club ===
As of 14 March 2021.

Club	Season	League			State League		Cup		Other		Total	
Club	Season	Division	Apps	Goals	Apps	Goals	Apps	Goals	Apps	Goals	Apps	Goals
América-RN	2019	Série D	2	0	5 (Note: Appearances in the Campeonato Potiguar)	1	0	0	0	0	7	1
Oliveirense	2020–21	Liga Portugal 2	7	0	–		0	0	0	0	7	0
Career total			9	0	5	1	0	0	0	0	14	1
