= Vasilios Kostika =

Greek footballer

Personal information
- Date of birth: 4 September 1999 (age 27)
- Place of birth: Mexiates, Ypati, Greece
- Height: 1.74 m (5 ft 9 in)
- Position: Winger

Team information
- Current team: Nestos Chrysoupoli
- Number: 11

Youth career
- 2017–2019: Lamia

Senior career*
Years	Team	Apps	(Gls)
2018–2021	Lamia	3	(0)
2020	→ Atalanti (loan)	5	(2)
2021–2022	Kallithea	18	(2)
2022–2024	Apollon Kalamarias	20	(1)
2024	Iraklis	5	(0)
2024–2025	Panargiakos	20	(4)
2025–	Nestos Chrysoupoli	25	(4)
- * Club domestic league appearances and goals as of 26 April 2026

Vasilios Kostika (Greek: Βασίλειος Κωστίκα; born 4 September 1999) is a Greek professional footballer who plays as a winger for Super League 2 club Nestos Chrysoupoli.
