= Saado Abdel Salam Fouflia =

Palestinian footballer

Personal information
- Date of birth: 23 November 1997 (age 28)
- Place of birth: Agrinio, Greece
- Height: 1.90 m (6 ft 3 in)
- Position: Defender

Team information
- Current team: Panargiakos
- Number: 5

Youth career
- –2017: Panetolikos

Senior career*
Years	Team	Apps	(Gls)
2017–2020	Platanias	18	(1)
2020–2021	Ermis Aradippou	15	(0)
2021–2023	Rodos	0	(0)
2023–	Panargiakos	43	(0)

International career^{‡}
2018	Palestine U23	4	(0)
- * Club domestic league appearances and goals as of 20:02, 9 June 2021 (UTC) ‡ National team caps and goals as of 18:02, 22 July 2019 (UTC)

Saado Abdel Salam Fouflia (Arabic: سعدو عبد السلام; born 23 November 1997) is a professional footballer who plays as a defender for Greek Super League 2 club Panargiakos F.C.

== Career statistics ==
=== Club ===
As of 22 July 2019.

Club	Season	League			Cup		Continental		Other		Total	
Club	Season	Division	Apps	Goals	Apps	Goals	Apps	Goals	Apps	Goals	Apps	Goals
Platanias	2016–17	Super League Greece	1	0	0	0	–		0	0	1	0
Platanias	2017–18	Super League Greece	3	0	0	0	–		0	0	3	0
Platanias	2018–19	Football League	1	0	1 (Note: Appearances in the Greek Cup)	0	–		0	0	2	0
Career total			4	0	1	0	0	0	0	0	5	0
