= Luizinho (footballer, born 1977) =

Brazilian footballer

Personal information
- Full name: Luiz Fernando Pontes Ribeiro
- Date of birth: December 21, 1977 (age 48)
- Place of birth: Rio de Janeiro, Brazil
- Height: 1.80 m (5 ft 11 in)
- Position: Midfielder

Senior career*
Years	Team	Apps	(Gls)
2002–2004	De Graafschap	1	(0)
2004	Le Havre		
2005	FC Groningen	6	(0)
2005–2007	VVV-Venlo	65	(16)
2007–2008	Lombard-Pápa	25	(8)
2009	Marcílio Dias	8	(3)
- * Club domestic league appearances and goals

Luiz Fernando Pontes Ribeiro (born 21 December 1977 in Rio de Janeiro), known as Luizinho, is a Brazilian football player.

Luizinho also played for De Graafschap, FC Groningen and Le Havre before signed two-year contract with VVV-Venlo.
