= Thyella Katsikas F.C. =

Association football club in Greece

Thyella Katsikas
- Full name: Podosfairikos Athlitikos Syllogos Thyella Katsikas
- Founded: 1948; 78 years ago
- Ground: Katsikas Municipal Stadium
- Chairman: Alexandros Vartziotis
- Manager: Giannis Lolis
- League: Gamma Ethniki
- 2025–26: Epirus FCA First Division, 1st (promoted)
- Website: Official website
Home colours

Thyella Katsikas (Greek: Θύελλα Κατσικάς) is a Greek football club based in Katsikas, Ioannina.

== History ==
Thyella Katsikas was founded in 1948. Later, it joined the Epirus Football Clubs Association under the Hellenic Football Federation registration number 853. The club began competing in the Epirus FCA Third Division and earned promotion during the 1960–61 season. Over the next two years, it competed in the Second Division before securing promotion to the First Division for the first time in its history during the 1962–63 season.

Following its promotion to the First Division, Thyella Katsikas began playing a leading role in the top tier of Epirus FCA, challenging for the league title. In 1972, the club finished in second place behind champion PAS Preveza and, alongside Olympos Kerkyra, participated in Group 7 of the qualifying round for the 1972 Greek Football Clubs Association Winners' Championship special amateur championship for promotion to the Beta Ethniki. However, Thyella was unable to advance and was eliminated from the final phase.

In 1975, the club finished first in the northern group of the Epirus FCA First Division and participated once again in the 1975 Greek Football Clubs Association Winners' Championship special amateur championship, placing 6th in Group 4 and missing out on promotion to the Beta Ethniki. Over the subsequent period through 1981, Thyella Katsikas won the Epirus FCA First Division title three consecutive times during the 1978–79, 1979–80, and 1980–81 seasons. Additionally, the team won the Epirus FCA Cup three times (1971–72, 1972–73, and 1974–75) and finished as runners-up in 1973–74, 1975–76, and 1977–78, becoming the only club in the association's history to reach five consecutive cup finals.

During the 1981–22 season, Thyella Katsikas competed in the National Amateur League, finishing 7th in Group 4. From 1982 to 1988, the club maintained a continuous presence in the Delta Ethniki. For five consecutive seasons, it competed in Group 3, finishing 8th, 5th, 4th, 4th, and 5th, respectively. In the 1987–88 season, participating in Group 1, the team finished 7th and entered a relegation play-off against Ilisiakos, A.O.K. Faliro, and Achilleas Triandrias, who had finished in the same position in their respective groups. Ultimately, Thyella was relegated to the regional leagues, ending a seven-year spell in the national divisions.

The return to the Delta Ethniki was immediate. During the 1989–90 season, the club finished 20th in Group 3, in a season where no team was relegated. In 1990–91, competing in Group 9, it finished 7th, followed by a 12th-place finish in Group 7 during the 1991–92 season. The following campaign (1992–93) saw Thyella compete in Group 7 once again, finishing in 6th place, before placing 15th in Group 7 during the 1993–94 season and suffering relegation to the regional leagues. This relegation brought an end to a long era for Thyella Katsikas in the national divisions.

During this period, the club won five EPS Epirus Cups and finished as runner-up once. Furthermore, during the 1983–84 season, the team reached the semi-finals of the Greek Amateur Cup, where they were eliminated on penalties 4–2 following a 1–1 draw after regular time by eventual cup winner Niki Dioikitirio at the Nea Efkarpia Stadium. Prior to facing Niki Dioikitirio, Thyella had eliminated Hellas Kalliniki, Pyrsos Grevena, and Ethnikos Axioupoli.

In the following years, Thyella competed in the regional leagues. It won the 2003 championship undefeated, earning promotion back to the Delta Ethniki. During the 2003–04 season, competing in Group 5, the club finished 15th and was relegated. In 2006, it won the Epirus Football Clubs Association championship once again to return to the Delta Ethniki. In the 2006–07 campaign, participating in Group 5, the team finished 13th and suffered relegation once more.

In the following years, Thyella competed in the regional leagues. During the 2013–14 season, the club was relegated to the Second Division for the first time in its history. It earned promotion back to the First Division for the 2015–16 season, where it remained in the subsequent years. In 2020, Thyella won the Epirus FCA First Division title for the first time in 14 years, finishing undefeated after 21 matches (18 wins, 3 draws, 0 losses) in a season truncated from 30 matches due to the COVID-19 pandemic.

During the 2020–21 season, which was conducted in a single round-robin format, Thyella fought to avoid relegation but was unsuccessful, finishing in 9th place. In the 2022–23 season, Thyella won Epirus FCA Championship again. In the 2022–23 season, the club won the Epirus Football Clubs Association Cup for the first time in 30 years, having last won it in 1993. That same season, Thyella also secured the regional league title and earned promotion to the Gamma Ethniki through the Greek Football Clubs Association Winners' Championship special promotion tournament, finishing 1st in Group 3. In the 2023–24 season, the club finished 13th and was relegated, falling short of safety by a narrow margin of points.

During the 2025–26 season, Thyella won the Epirus FCA championship, clinching the title on the penultimate matchday and earning promotion back to the Gamma Ethniki.

== Crest and colors ==
The crest of Thyella features a trophy cup flanked by ears of wheat. The trophy symbolizes the club's achievements, while the wheat represents the agricultural character of the local region. The club’s colours are red and white.

== Honours ==
=== Regional titles ===
- Epirus FCA Championship: 10
  - 1974–75, 1978–79, 1979–80, 1980–81, 2002–03, 2005–06, 2019–20, 2021–22, 2022–23, 2025–26
- Epirus FCA Cup: 12
  - 1971–72, 1972–73, 1974–75, 1981–82, 1983–84, 1984–85, 1985–86, 1992–93, 2022–23, 2023–24, 2024–25, 2025–26

== Other Departments ==
On 30 October 2018, Thyella Katsikas announced the establishment of a women's football department. On 2025, Thyella Katsikas announced the creation of a basketball team.
