= Antonis Karageorgis =

Greek footballer

Personal information
- Full name: Antonios Karageorgis
- Date of birth: 16 May 1997 (age 29)
- Place of birth: Rhodes, Greece
- Height: 1.84 m (6 ft 0 in)
- Position: Centre-back

Team information
- Current team: Rodos
- Number: 28

Youth career
- AEL Kalloni

Senior career*
Years	Team	Apps	(Gls)
2016	AEL Kalloni	0	(0)
2016–2018	Olympiacos	0	(0)
2016–2017	→ AEL Kalloni (loan)	3	(0)
2017–2018	→ Chania (loan)	4	(0)
2018–2020	Chania	15	(0)
2020–	Rodos	15	(0)
- * Club domestic league appearances and goals as of 25 February 2020

Antonis Karageorgis (Greek: Αντώνης Καραγεώργης; born 16 May 1997) is a Greek professional footballer who plays as a centre-back for Super League 2 club Rodos.
