= Georgios Petsitis =

Greek footballer

Personal information
- Full name: Georgios Petsitis
- Date of birth: 11 May 2000 (age 26)
- Place of birth: Eleusis, Greece
- Height: 1.82 m (6 ft 0 in)
- Position: Midfielder

Team information
- Current team: Mandraikos

Youth career
- Atromitos

Senior career*
Years	Team	Apps	(Gls)
2019	Mandraikos	11	(1)
2019	Akratitos	6	(0)
2020	Kalamata	3	(0)
2021	Olympias Lympion	0	(0)
2021	Aspropyrgos	5	(0)
2021–2022	Tilikratis	20	(2)
2022	Irodotos	5	(0)
2022–2023	Aiolikos		
2023	Panachaiki	0	(0)
2024–	Mandraikos		
- * Club domestic league appearances and goals as of 12 January 2020

Georgios Petsitis (Greek: Γεώργιος Πετσίτης; born 11 May 2000) is a Greek professional footballer who plays as a midfielder for Mandraikos.
