= Thriamvos Serviana F.C. =

Greek football club

Thriamvos Serviana
- Full name: A.O. Thriamvos Serviana
- Founded: 1981; 44 years ago
- Ground: Epirus FCA Stadium, Ioannina, Greece
- Chairman: Panagiotis Nassis
- Manager: Nikolaos Gkouras
- League: Gamma Ethniki
- 2017-18: Epirus FCA champion
- Website: http://thriamvos-serviana.eu/

Thriamvos Serviana Football Club is a Greek football club, based in Serviana, Ioannina, Greece.

== Honours ==
=== Domestic ===
  - Epirus FCA champion: 1
    - 2017–18
  - Epirus FCA Cup Winners: 2
    - 2017–18, 2018–19
