= Pavlos Karvounis =

Greek footballer

Personal information
- Date of birth: 5 December 2002 (age 23)
- Place of birth: Athens, Greece
- Height: 1.79 m (5 ft 10 in)
- Position: Midfielder

Team information
- Current team: Panachaiki
- Number: 39

Youth career
- 2010–2021: Panathinaikos

Senior career*
Years	Team	Apps	(Gls)
2021–2024	Panathinaikos B	43	(0)
2024–	Egaleo	23	(1)
2025–2026	→ 1º Dezembro (loan)	6	(0)
2026-	Panachaiki	0	(0)
- * Club domestic league appearances and goals as of 04 August 2026

Pavlos Karvounis (Greek: Παύλος Καρβούνης; born 5 December 2002) is a Greek professional footballer who plays as a midfielder for Liga 3 club 1º de Dezembro, on loan from Egaleo. He previously played for Panathinaikos B.
