= A.E. Kifisia F.C. =

Association football club in Greece

A.E. Kifisia
- Full name: Athlitiki Enosi Kifisia Football Club
- Nickname: Κυανόλευκοι (The Blue-Whites)
- Founded: 2012; 14 years ago
- Ground: Leoforos Alexandras Stadium
- Capacity: 16,003
- Chairman: Christos Pritsas
- Head coach: Sebastián Leto
- League: Super League Greece
- 2025–26: Super League Greece, 10th of 14
- Website: kifisiafc.gr
Home colours	Away colours

A.E. Kifisia Football Club (Greek: Α.Ε. Κηφισιά) is a Greek professional football club based in Kifissia, a suburban town in the Athens agglomeration, Greece. It was founded in 2012 after the merger of A.O. Kifisia and A.O.K. Elpidoforos. They compete in the Super League.

== History ==
=== The first years of the new club ===
A.E. Kifisia was founded in 2012 after the merge of A.O. Kifisia and A.O.K. Elpidoforos, so that the area of Kifisia has a competitive club that actively participates in the national categories.

In its first season in 2012–13, as a newly formed club participated in the 8th Group of the 4th National Division, essentially taking the place of Elpidoforos, they finished in second place with 42 points behind A.O. Egaleo; this meant that they won the promotion to the then-newly formed league, after the merge of the professional 3rd Division Men's football and the amateur 4th Division Men's. They also won the Athens FCA cup 2012–13 from Egaleo at the stadium of Nea Smyrni, 1-1 during the regular season and 4–3 on penalties. In this match, an original scene prevailed on the stands as there were fans of Kifisia of Egaleo and Panionios, with the latter supporting the team of the northern suburbs, the club gained financial support from a number of fans, such as Vangelis Mitas financing the Kifisia's Security System and "super-fan" Ioannis Anestis' generous donation that financed Kifisia's kit and training equipment.

The next three years were the worst for Kifisia. In the period of 2015–2016, their participation again in the 4th group of the 3rd division was essentially their first period that risked relegation, after finishing one position above the relegation zone, specifically in ninth place and with five points difference from the tenth place Asteras Varis. In the 2016–2017 season, they were even more at risk than the previous year, after finishing three points above the relegation zone, while at the same time he reached again the semi-final phase of the 3rd division Cup, where they were knocked out by Achaiki in a penalty shootout that ended 5–4. The relegation of Kifisia finally came in the 2017–18 season, where they finished with 21 points in ninth place, five points less than the salvation of the seventh place. Kifisia was mathematically relegated in the penultimate game, after the 5–0 away defeat by Ierapetra. Despite their relegation, in the same period, Kifisia won once again the EPSA cup 2017–18, defeating Agia Paraskevi 2–0 at the Municipal Stadium of Peristeri.

In the next period of 2018–19, they easily won the championship of the A Division of EPSA with only one defeat in 30 matches and returned to the national categories.

The next season, they finished with 36 points in 26 games in the 4th place of the 5th group of the category.

The promotion that Kifisia was looking for in the last decade was finally achieved in the 2020–21 season, where with 12 wins and just one defeat they won the first place of the 7th group with a difference of eight points. During that season, only the first round of the league was held due to the coronavirus pandemic. After winning the first place, Kifisia qualified for the promotion playoffs for the then newly formed Super League 2, where he made the absolute with four in four victories against Panionios, Zakynthos, Thyella Rafinas and Herodotus of Nea Alikarnassos with in its first promotion in its history.

=== A.E. Kifisia in the professional divisions ===
The maiden participation of A.E. Kifisia in the professional categories was highly successful. In the Greek Cup, eliminating Apollon Smyrnis, they advanced to the round of 16 stage where they were drawn with AEK Athens. In the first game in OAKA, they lost with 4–0, but in the second leg, Kifisia managed to draw 1-1. In the league, Kifisia finished sixth in a group of 17 teams, even though they played away from home due to construction work at Zirineio Stadium. At the same time, the newly established U20 team of Kifisia reached the final of the U20 Super League 2, where they were defeated by Egaleo U20, in a relatively controversial game, losing 1–2.

=== Promotion to the first national division ===
In the 2022–23 season, Kifisia finished in first place of the south group of Super League 2 and secured promotion to the first national division of Greece (Super League 1) for the first time in their history. Kifisia secured the first place on June 11th, 2023, after the 1–1 draw against Kalamata at Zirineio Stadium. On September 1, 2023, in a 2–1 win over Atromitos Kifisia recorded their first win in the top tier of Greek football.

== Facilities ==
=== Ground ===
The ground of Kifisia is the Municipal Stadium of Kifissia "Zirineio", which is located at 192 Kifissias Avenue. Zirineio has two concrete stands along the stadium. The main (North) stand of Zirineio has a capacity of around 1050 seats while the guest stand (South) around 300 seats. With the promotion of Kifisia in Super League 2, renovation work was done so that Zirineio to be able to host professional level matches. After 30 years, the existing turf will be removed and a new natural one will be installed, with faster regrowth and greater durability. Among the projects that are planned is the placement of seats in the stands, new fencing, the addition of commentary booths, and construction of an extension of the south stand with an additional 300-400 seats. Work on the construction of the stadium began in 1929 and was completed in May 1932 at a total cost of 4,000,000 drachmas. During this time, they stopped temporarily due to disagreements over its name, because at that time, stadiums were not named after individuals. Thus, Zirineio became the first stadium in Greece with the name of an individual person. Kifisia used the Kaisariani Municipal Stadium “Michalis Kritikopoulos”, with a capacity of 3,205, as a home ground but returned after 2 whole years to Zirineio, on April 19, 2023, with the 1–1 draw against Proodeftiki. Unfortunately, Zirineio are eligible grounds for the first division of Greece (Super League 1).

=== Training facilities ===
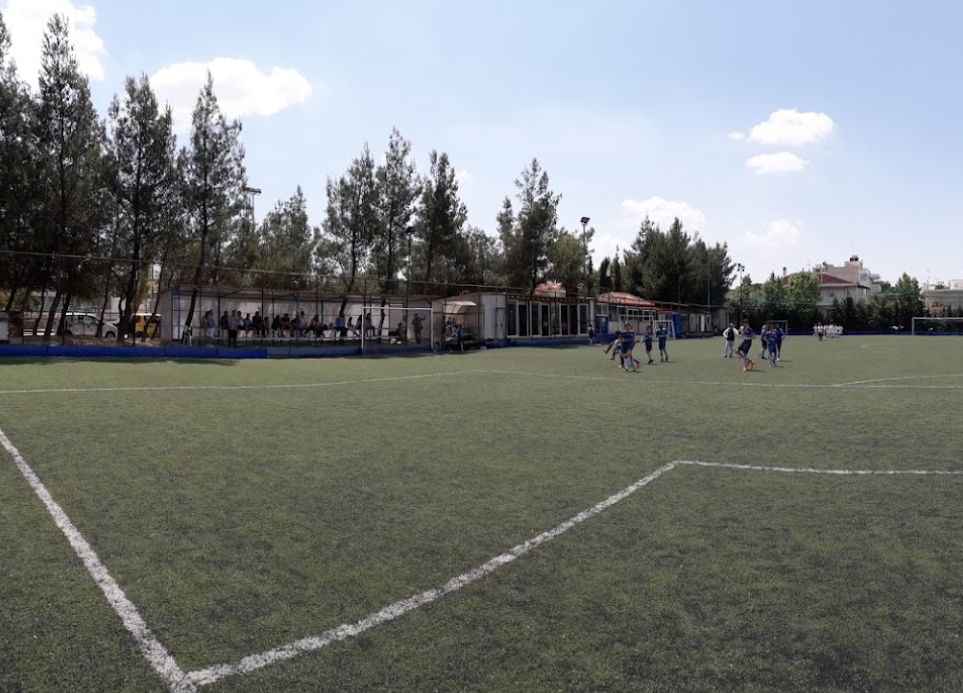
The Kifisia academy training ground

Kifisia is one of the few amateur teams with a privately owned training center. Specifically, the training center of Kifisia is a property of AO Elpidoforos that passed to Kifisia with its merge with Kifisia, so the facilities are known as "Stadium of Elpidoforos." After the concession of the training center to Kifisia, a plastic turf was installed and the surrounding railings were repaired. Generally, the training center is constantly upgraded. The training center of Kifisia houses the academies which are considered one of the largest in the region of Attica, with repeated appearances in the final phases of EPSA championships and continuous promotions of players in the respective departments of professional clubs.

== Supporters and rivalries ==
=== Supporters ===
A.E. Kifisia has a relatively small amount of supporters which are mostly from the northern part of Athens. There are two different supporters' groups of the club which actively attend games and show their support for the club, "Kifissia Ultras" and "Northistas Club".

"Kifissia Ultras" or "Σύνδεσμος Φιλάθλων Κηφισιάς", are the main supporters' group of the club. The group is made up of supporters coming from Southern Kifisia, Northern Kifisia, Central Kifisia, Nea Kifisia, Nea Erythrea, and Ekali. Most fans come from the ultras group "Jokers", of AENK in Nea Kifisia, from older Elpidoforos supporters, but also from other local ultras groups. "Kifissia Ultras" share friendships with "Drosia Ultras Gate 3" and "Raptors Nea Erythrea Club". Due to various reasons, the group is not active anymore and rarely attends games. Northistas Kifisia, is also a very popular Instagram page dedicated to the team, which also functions as a supporters group.

=== Rivalries ===
A.E. Kifisia's main football rivals are smaller Athens football clubs like Kallithea, Egaleo, Fostiras, Apollon Smyrnis, Proodeftiki and more. The supporters' rivals are Pefki, Maroussi, Colonos, Irakleio, and Elefsina.

== Course over the years ==
Season	League	Position	W. - D. - L.	Goals	Pts
2012–13	Delta Ethniki (4th Division)	2nd	13 - 3 - 4	31–16	32
2013–14	Gamma Ethniki (3rd Division)	2nd	16 - 6 - 6	59–31	54
2014–15	Gamma Ethniki (3rd Division)	2nd	12 - 10 - 4	35–19	46
2015–16	Gamma Ethniki (3rd Division)	9th	13 - 7 - 10	38–32	46
2016–17	Gamma Ethniki (3rd Division)	11th	7 - 9 - 12	30–36	30
2017–18	Gamma Ethniki (3rd Division)	9th	5 - 6 - 9	23–33	21
2018–19	Athens FCA (4th Division)	1st	22 - 5 - 1	74–21	71
2019–20	Gamma Ethniki (3rd Division)	4th	11 - 3 - 9	26–22	36
2020–21	Gamma Ethniki (3rd Division)	1st	11 - 0 - 1	28–5	33
2021–22	SuperLeague 2 (2nd Division)	6th	15 - 5 - 12	37–31	50
2022–23	SuperLeague 2 (2nd Division)	1st	20 - 6 - 2	62–16	66
2023–24	SuperLeague (1st Division)	13th	6 - 10 - 17	38–68	28
2024–25	SuperLeague 2 (2nd Division)	1st	22 - 5 - 1	49–13	65
2025–26	SuperLeague (1st Division)	10th	9 - 14 - 13	40–51	41

== Honours ==
PAE Kifisia F.C. honours
Type	Competition	Titles	Seasons
Domestic	Super League Greece 2	2	2022–23, 2024–25
Domestic	Gamma Ethniki	1	2020–21

=== Regional titles ===
- Athens FCA First Division
  - Winners (1): 2018–19
- Athens FCA Cup
  - Winners (3): 1990–91, 2012–13, 2017–18

== Players ==
=== Current squad ===
As of 17 September 2026

Note: Flags indicate national team as defined under FIFA eligibility rules; some limited exceptions apply. Players may hold more than one non-FIFA nationality.

No.	Pos.	Nation	Player
1	GK	GRE	Filippos Roberts
2	DF	GRE	Konstantinos Apostolakis
3	DF	ESP	Jon de Luis
4	MF	GRE	Giannis Doiranlis
5	DF	BUL	Aleks Petkov
6	MF	ESP	Jorge Pombo
7	MF	CUW	Jeremy Antonisse
8	MF	POR	Benny
9	FW	GRE	Dimitrios Theodoridis
10	MF	POR	Gerson Sousa
11	MF	CGO	Jordi Mboula
15	GK	GRE	Alexandros Anagnostopoulos
16	MF	GRE	Alexandros Pothas
17	MF	GRE	Konstantinos Roukounakis
18	MF	GRE	Giorgos Kyriopoulos (on loan from Panathinaikos)
19	MF	SWE	Imam Jagne (on loan from IFK Göteborg)
20	FW	GRE	Michalis Patiras

No.	Pos.	Nation	Player
21	DF	GRE	Nektarios Kaloskamis (on loan from Panathinaikos)
23	DF	FRA	Leroy Abanda
24	DF	CUW	Roshon van Eijma
26	DF	GRE	Konstantinos Polykratis
27	DF	GRE	Georgios Zygouras
28	MF	CHI	Ángelo Sagal
31	MF	CYP	Ioannis Kousoulos
33	DF	POR	Hugo Sousa
34	DF	FRA	Clément Jolibois
36	MF	GRE	Pavlos Mavroudis
44	MF	GRE	Vangelis Manganas
47	FW	GRE	Lefteris Klimathianos
48	DF	POR	Tiago Manso
72	FW	GRE	Apostolos Christopoulos
74	DF	GRE	Konstantinos Lampsias
91	GK	GRE	Loukas Stamellos
99	GK	ECU	Moisés Ramírez

=== Out on loan ===
Note: Flags indicate national team as defined under FIFA eligibility rules; some limited exceptions apply. Players may hold more than one non-FIFA nationality.

No.	Pos.	Nation	Player
—	DF	GRE	Fotis Chachoulis (at Niki Volos until 30 June 2027)
—	DF	NGR	Timipere Johnson Eboh (at Nea Salamis Famagusta until 30 June 2027)
—	MF	GRE	Christos Ligdas (at Niki Volos until 30 June 2027)

=== Records and statistics ===
Information correct as of the match played on 19 September 2026. Bold denotes an active player for the club.
The tables refer to A.E. Kifisia's players in Super League Greece, Greek Football Cup, Second Division Greece, Third Division Greece and Delta Ethniki.

==== Top 5 Most Capped Players ====
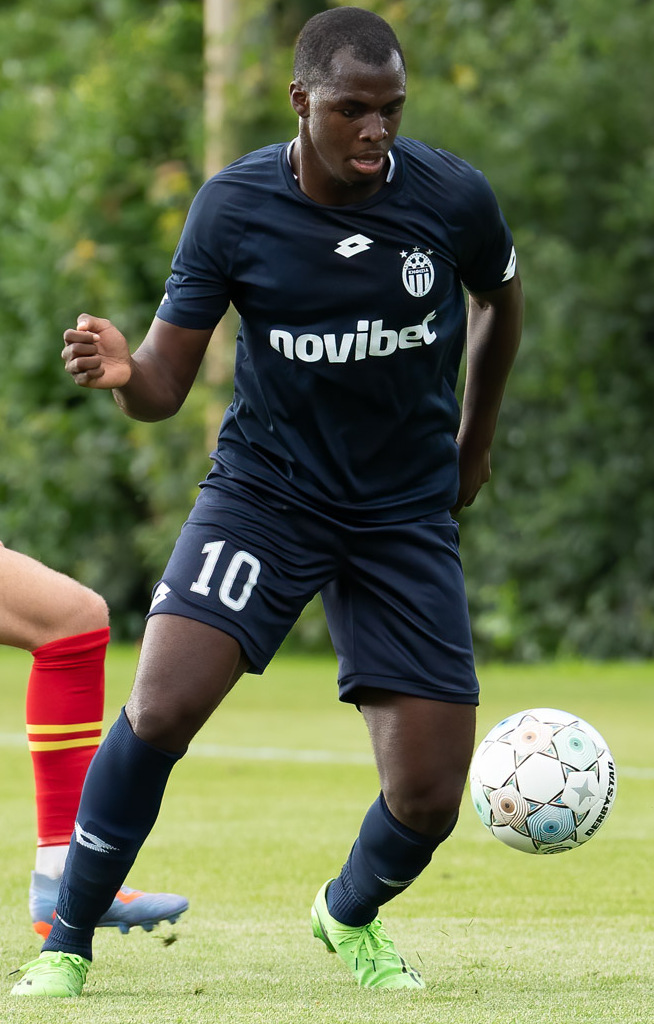
Andrews Tetteh is currently the most-capped player and the first scorer of A.E. Kifisia in professional football

Rank	Player	Years	App
1	(Greece) Andrews Tetteh	2020–2026	135
2	(Greece) Giannis Sotirakos	2021–2023, 2024–2025	78
3	(Greece) **Alexandros Anagnostopoulos**	2022–2024; 2026–	76
4	(Greece) Antonis Papasavvas	2020–2024	75
5	(Spain) **Jorge Pombo**	2024–	73

==== Top 5 Goalscorers ====
Rank	Player	Years	Goals
1	(Greece) Andrews Tetteh	2020–2026	48
2	(Greece) Georgios Manalis	2024–2025	20
3	(Spain) **Jorge Pombo**	2024–	19
4	(Greece) Michalis Kouiroukidis	2022–2023	17
5	(Serbia) Ognjen Ožegović	2023–2024	16

== Technical staff ==
Position	Staff
Head coach	(Argentina) Sebastián Leto
Assistant coach	(Greece) Nikolaos Panagiotaras
Goalkeeper coach	(Greece) Konstantinos Paganias
Strength and conditioning coach	(Greece) Lazaros Vardakis
Fitness coach	(Greece) Filimon Vasilarakis
Match analyst	(Greece) Panagiotis Trampas
Physiotherapist	(Greece) Anastasios Vangalatis
Technical director	(Spain) Alberto Botía
