= 2025–26 PAS Giannina F.C. season =

PAS Giannina
2025–26 season
- Chairman: Panagiotis Christovasilis
- Manager: Alexandros Tatsis (until 20 August); Nikos Koustas (from 21 August until 16 November); Giannis Goumas (from 17 November)
- Stadium: Zosimades Stadium, Ioannina
- Super League 2: 9th (North group)
- Greek Cup: Qualifying Round
| Home colours | Away colours |

The 2025–26 season is PAS Giannina F.C.'s 29th competitive season in the second division of Greek football, 3rd season in the Super League Greece 2, and 60th year in existence as a football club. They also compete in the Greek Cup.

== Players ==
Updated:21/3/26

| No. | Name | Nationality | Position(s) | Place of birth | Date of birth | Signed from | Notes |
|---|---|---|---|---|---|---|---|
Goalkeepers
| 1 | Antzelo Sina | (Albania) (Greece) | GK | | 7 January 2004 | (Portugal) Rio Ave | Loan |
| 31 | Michail Ladias | (Greece) | GK | Ioannina, Greece | 15 December 2003 | | |
| 99 | Thomas Vrakas (Vice Captain) | (Greece) | GK | Ioannina, Greece | 22 July 2004 | (Greece) PAS Giannina U19 | |
Defenders
| 2 | Georgios Tourkochoritis | (Greece) | RB | Livadeia, Greece | 12 January 2002 | (Greece) Asteras Tripolis B | |
| 4 | Alexandros Doumas (Vice Captain/Captain) | (Greece) | CB | | 3 February 2003 | (Greece) Pallavreotikos | |
| 5 | Panagiotis Kafenzis | (Greece) | CB/DM | Ioannina, Greece | 5 October 2005 | (Greece) PAS Giannina U19 | |
| 15 | Kasper Viramaki | (Finland) | CB | Helsinki, Finland | 4 September 2004 | (Finland) PK-35 | |
| 20 | Vasilis Kaperdas | (Greece) | RB | Ioannina, Greece | 25 July 2004 | (Greece) GS Ilioupolis | |
| 21 | Dimitris Naoumis | (Greece) | LB | Ioannina, Greece | 3 August 2004 | (Greece) PAS Giannina U19 | |
| 33 | Steven Havales | (Greece) (Australia) | CB | East Melbourne, Australia | 16 February 2003 | (Greece) Levadiakos | |
| 42 | Fotios Gogas | (Greece) | CB | Ioannina, Greece | 22 March 2008 | (Greece) PAS Giannina U19 | |
| 74 | Vasilios Prekates | (Greece) | CB | | 29 August 2005 | (Greece) Olympiacos B | Loan |
| 75 | Ermis Selimaj | (Albania) (Greece) | LB | Athens, Greece | 25 May 2004 | (Greece) AEK Athens B | |
| 83 | Eleftherios Grestas | (Greece) | LB | Ioannina, Greece | 10 December 2008 | (Greece) PAS Giannina U19 | |
| 87 | Vasilios Kitsakis | (Greece) | RB | Ioannina, Greece | 24 January 2004 | (Greece) PAOK B | |
Midfielders
| 6 | Angelos Tsiris | (Greece) | DM/MC | Ioannina, Greece | 18 August 2004 | (Greece) Giouchtas | |
| 7 | Vasilis Athanasiou | (Greece) | MR/AMR | | 8 August 2005 | (Greece) PAS Giannina U19 | |
| 18 | Christos Kryparakos | (Greece) | AML | Athens, Greece | 12 June 2003 | (Greece) Panathinaikos | Loan |
| 19 | Nikos Anagnostou | (Greece) | MC | Ioannina, Greece | 3 February 2010 | (Greece) PAS Giannina U17 | |
| 28 | Andreas Panagiotakopoulos | (Greece) | AML | Patras, Greece | 14 July 2006 | (Italy) Triestina U19 | |
| 44 | Dylan Tutonda | (Switzerland) | DM | | 6 July 2003 | (Switzerland) AC Bellinzona | |
| 66 | Konstantinos Ntekoumes | (Greece) | MR | Ioannina, Greece | 3 March 2008 | (Greece) PAS Giannina U19 | |
| 78 | Tasos Symeonidis | (Greece) | DM/MC | kilkis, Greece | 6 July 2004 | (Greece) PAOK Kristoni | |
| 80 | Agelos Papadopoulos | (Greece) | AM | Florina, Greece | 21 August 2005 | (Greece) Asteras Tripolis B | |
| 88 | Renild Kasemi | (Albania) (Greece) | MC/AM | | 5 April 2003 | (Greece) Levadiakos | |
| 96 | Dimitris Floros | (Greece) | AM | | 14 May 2008 | (Greece) PAS Giannina U19 | |
| 98 | Giorgos Krimitzas | (Greece) | DM | Thessaloniki, Greece | 30 June 2002 | (Greece) Athens Kallithea | |
Forwards
| 24 | Emiljano Bullari (Vice Captain) | (Albania) (Greece) | FW | Naxos, Greece | 6 April 2001 | (Albania) KF Laçi | |
| 30 | Vasilios Kontonikos | (Greece) | FW | Lamia, Greece | 11 October 2005 | (Greece) AEK Athens | Loan |
| 45 | Candas Fiogbé | (Benin) | FW | Dékanmey, Benin | 18 January 2005 | (Italy) Atalanta U23 | Loan |
| 79 | Themis Patrinos | (Greece) | FW | Athens, Greece | 18 January 2001 | (Greece) Panachaiki | |
Left during Winter Transfer Window
| 14 | Christos Dimos | (Greece) | GK | | 3 July 2003 | (Greece) Ethnikos Piraeus | |
| 10 | Dylan Flores | (Costa Rica) | AM | San José, Costa Rica | 30 May 1993 | (Guatemala) Marquense | |
| 27 | Rayvien Rosario | (Curaçao) (Netherlands) | AML | Willemstad, Curaçao | 11 April 2004 | (Netherlands) Excelsior | |
| 3 | Klaudio Balliu | (Albania) | LB | | 20 May 2006 | (Greece) Iraklis | |
| 22 | Alexandros Chaidos | (Greece) | RB | Ioannina, Greece | 22 April 2002 | (Greece) GS Ilioupolis | |
| 17 | Alexandros Elezi | (Greece) (Albania) | AMLR | Athens, Greece | 3 January 2003 | (Greece) AEK Athens | |
| 16 | Panagiotis Panagiotou (Vice Captain) | (Greece) | CB | Ioannina, Greece | 16 January 2002 | (Cyprus) Ethnikos Achna | |
| 11 | Nikolaos Dosis | (Greece) (Sweden) | MC | | 25 January 2001 | (Greece) Volos | |
| 9 | Pedro Conde (Captain) | (Spain) | FW | Villafranca, Spain | 26 July 1988 | (Greece) Volos | |
| 8 | Marko Brkljača | (Croatia) | DM/MC/AM | Zadar, Croatia | 15 July 2004 | (Croatia) Dinamo Zagreb | |
| 12 | Gboly Ariyibi | (United States) (England) (Nigeria) | AML | Arlington, Virginia, United States | 18 January 1995 | (Portugal) Boavista | |
| 90 | Nikos Tzovaras | (Greece) | FW | Ioannina, Greece | 26 February 2007 | (Greece) PAS Giannina U19 | |
| 77 | Panagiotis Lygas | (Greece) | DM | | 12 September 2003 | (Greece) Panargiakos | |
| 49 | Vasilis Pavlidis | (Greece) | LB/CB | Thessaloniki, Greece | 4 September 2002 | (Greece) AEK Athens B | |

=== International players ===
- (Costa Rica) Dylan Flores (men's/U23/20/17)
- (Curaçao) Rayvien Rosario (men's)
- (Benin) Candas Fiogbé (men's)
- (United States) Gboly Ariyibi (U23/20)
- (Albania) Antzelo Sina (U21)
- (Greece) Panagiotis Panagiotou (U21/17/16)
- (Greece) Georgios Tourkochoritis (U21)
- (Albania) Emiljano Bullari (U21/19/18/17/16)
- (Albania) Ermis Selimaj (U21)

- (Greece) Christos Kryparakos (U21/19/17)
- (Albania) Renild Kasemi (U21/19)
- (Croatia) Marko Brkljača (U19/18/17/15)
- (Greece) Vasilios Kontonikos (U19)
- (Greece) Tasos Symeonidis (U19/18)
- (Greece) Andreas Panagiotakopoulos (U19/18)
- (Greece) Vasilios Kitsakis (U19/17)
- (Greece) Themis Patrinos (U17)
- (Greece) (Sweden) Nikolaos Dosis (U16)

=== Foreign players ===
EU Nationals
- (Spain) (Europe) Pedro Conde
- (Croatia) (Europe) Marko Brkljača
- (Finland) (Europe) Kasper Viramaki

EU Nationals (Dual Citizenship)
- (Albania) (Greece) (Europe) Antzelo Sina
- (Greece) (Sweden) (Europe) Nikolaos Dosis
- (Albania) (Greece) (Europe) Emiljano Bullari
- (Albania) (Greece) (Europe) Ermis Selimaj
- (Curaçao) (Netherlands) (Europe) Rayvien Rosario
- (Greece) (Albania) (Europe) Alexandros Elezi
- (Albania) (Greece) (Europe) Renild Kasemi
- (Greece) (Australia) (Europe) Steven Havales

Non-EU Nationals
- (Costa Rica) Dylan Flores
- (Albania) Klaudio Balliu
- (United States) (England) (Nigeria) Gboly Ariyibi
- (Switzerland) Dylan Tutonda
- (Benin) Candas Fiogbé

== Personnel ==
=== Management ===
| Position | Staff |
|---|---|
| Majority Owner | Panagiotis & Giannis Christovasilis |
| President and CEO | Panagiotis Christovasilis |
| Vice President | Giannis Christovasilis |
| Amateur club member | Giorgos Oikonomou |

*Nikos Siontis is in charge of the club's administration.

=== Football Department ===
| Position | Staff |
|---|---|
| Technical Director | Themis Tzimopoulos (from 30 October 2025) |
| Team Manager | Giorgos Dasios (until 1 December 2025) |
| Ambassador | Eduardos Kontogeorgakis |

=== Coaching staff ===
| Position | Name |
|---|---|
| Head Coach | Alexandros Tatsis ct (from 11 August 2025 until 20 August 2025) Nikos Koustas (from 21 August 2025 until 16 November 2025) Giannis Goumas (from 17 November 2025) |
| Assistant Coach | Christos Raptis (from 11 August 2025 until 26 August 2025), Nikos Tzanoglou (from 21 August 2025), Manolis Skoufalis (from 26 August 2025) |
| Coach | |
| Fitness Coach | Dimitris Charisis |
| Goalkeepers Coach | Stathis Kandilaptis (until 18 August 2025), Athanasios Kouventaris (from 26 August 2025) |
| Analyst-exercise physiologist | Nikos Tzanoglou (from 21 August 2025) |

=== Medical staff ===
| Position | Name |
|---|---|
| Head doctor | Stavros Ristanis |
| Doctor | |
| Physio | Filippos Skordos,Marios Lamprou,Stefanos Soultis,Kostas Soukas |

=== Academy ===
| Position | Name |
|---|---|
| Head Coach U19 | Alekos Tatsis |
| Head Coach U17 | Christos Raptis |
| Fitness Coach | Dimitris Charisis |
| Goalkeepers Coach | Dimitris Katerinis |

== Transfers ==
=== Summer ===
==== In ====
| No | Pos | Player | Transferred from | Fee | Date | Source |
|---|---|---|---|---|---|---|
| 9 | FW | Pedro Conde | Volos | Free | 2 August 2025 | |
| 10 | AM | Dylan Flores | Marquense | Free | 1 September 2025 | |
| 1 | GK | Antzelo Sina | Rio Ave | Loan | 2 September 2025 | |
| 19 | CB | Panagiotis Panagiotou | Ethnikos Achna | Free | 2 September 2025 | |
| 49 | LB | Vasilis Pavlidis | AEK Athens B | Free | 2 September 2025 | |
| 8 | DM/MC/AM | Marko Brkljača | Dinamo Zagreb | Free | 3 September 2025 | |
| 22 | RB | Alexandros Chaidos | GS Ilioupolis | Free | 3 September 2025 | |
| 2 | RB | Georgios Tourkochoritis | Asteras Tripolis B | Free | 5 September 2025 | |
| 14 | GK | Christos Dimos | Ethnikos Piraeus | Free | 5 September 2025 | |
| 77 | DM | Panagiotis Lygas | Panargiakos | Free | 6 September 2025 | |
| 78 | DM/MC | Tasos Symeonidis | PAOK Kristoni | Free | 6 September 2025 | |
| 11 | MC | Nikolaos Dosis | Volos | Free | 8 September 2025 | |
| 74 | CB | Vasilios Prekates | Olympiacos B | Loan | 12 September 2025 | |
| 30 | FW | Vasilios Kontonikos | AEK Athens | Loan | 12 September 2025 | |
| 24 | FW | Emiljano Bullari | KF Laçi | Free | 12 September 2025 | |
| 75 | LB | Ermis Selimaj | AEK Athens B | Free | 13 September 2025 | |
| 27 | AML | Rayvien Rosario | Excelsior | Free | 13 September 2025 | |
| 18 | AML | Christos Kryparakos | Panathinaikos | Loan | 13 September 2025 | |
| 17 | AMLR | Alexandros Elezi | AEK Athens | Free | 13 September 2025 | |
| 3 | LB | Klaudio Balliu | Iraklis | Free | 16 September 2025 | |
| 12 | AML | Gboly Ariyibi | Boavista | Free | 17 September 2025 | |
| 79 | FW | Themis Patrinos | Panachaiki | Free | 1 October 2025 | |

==== Out ====
| No | Pos | Player | Transferred to | Fee | Date | Source |
|---|---|---|---|---|---|---|
| 45 | CB | Gerasimos Bakadimas | Olympiakos Nicosia | Free | 11 June 2025 | |
| 11 | FW | Jean-Baptiste Léo | Panserraikos | Free | 21 June 2025 | |
| 40 | DM | Tim Rieder | VSG Altglienicke | Free | 21 June 2025 | |
| 16 | DM/CM/AM | Matúš Begala | | End of contract | 30 June 2025 | |
| 99 | GK | Vasilis Athanasiou | Atromitos | End of contract | 30 June 2025 | |
| 22 | FW | Leonid Mina | | End of contract | 30 June 2025 | |
| 12 | LB | Ilias Simantirakis | OFI | End of loan | 30 June 2025 | |
| 27 | W | Moritz Heinrich | Iraklis | Free | 16 July 2025 | |
| 88 | CM/RLW | Alexandros Nikolias | Anagennisi Karditsa | Free | 21 July 2025 | |
| 8 | MF | Alexandros Lolis | Niki Volos | End of contract | 22 July 2025 | |
| 5 | DM | Christos Voutsas | Niki Volos | Free | 22 July 2025 | |
| 19 | AM/FW | Iason Kyrkos | Volos | Free | 24 July 2025 | |
| 9 | FW | Vasilios Mantzis | Kalamata | Free | 24 July 2025 | |
| 1 | GK | Panagiotis Ginis | Hellas Syros | Free | 1 August 2025 | |
| 25 | RB | Xenofon Panos | Ethnikos Neo Keramidi | Free | 1 August 2025 | |
| 80 | LB | Tasos Loupas | AEK Athens U19 | Free | 1 August 2025 | |
| 70 | AM | Orestis Kalemi | MFK Zemplín Michalovce | Free | 7 August 2025 | |
| 25 | GK | Ilias Grigoriou | AE Nea Selefkia | Free | 22 August 2025 | |
| 4 | CM/AM | Miguel Azeez | Morecambe | Free | 25 August 2025 | |
| 23 | MC | Panagiotis Chalatsis | Atlas FC | Free | 26 August 2025 | |

=== Winter ===
==== In ====
| No | Pos | Player | Transferred from | Fee | Date | Source |
|---|---|---|---|---|---|---|
| 88 | MC/AM | Renild Kasemi | Levadiakos | Free | 10 January 2026 | |
| 33 | CB | Steven Havales | Levadiakos | Free | 10 January 2026 | |
| 80 | AM | Agelos Papadopoulos | Asteras Tripolis B | Free | 10 January 2026 | |
| 98 | DM | Giorgos Krimitzas | Athens Kallithea | Free | 16 January 2026 | |
| 31 | GK | Michail Ladias | | Free | 20 January 2026 | |
| 87 | RB | Vasilios Kitsakis | PAOK B | Free | 21 January 2026 | |
| 44 | DM | Dylan Tutonda | AC Bellinzona | Free | 27 January 2026 | |
| 15 | CB | Kasper Viramaki | PK-35 | Free | 3 February 2026 | |
| 45 | FW | Candas Fiogbé | Atalanta U23 | Loan | 6 February 2026 | |
| 28 | AML | Andreas Panagiotakopoulos | Triestina U19 | Free | 7 February 2026 | |

==== Out ====
| No | Pos | Player | Transferred to | Fee | Date | Source |
|---|---|---|---|---|---|---|
| 14 | GK | Christos Dimos | Aris Petroupolis | Released | 19 November 2025 | |
| 10 | AM | Dylan Flores | | Released | 5 December 2025 | |
| 27 | AML | Rayvien Rosario | | Released | 5 December 2025 | |
| 22 | RB | Alexandros Chaidos | | Released | 17 December 2025 | |
| 17 | AMLR | Alexandros Elezi | AE Kifisia U19 | Released | 17 December 2025 | |
| 3 | LB | Klaudio Balliu | | Released | 17 December 2025 | |
| 16 | CB | Panagiotis Panagiotou | Kalamata | Released | 5 January 2026 | |
| 11 | MC | Nikolaos Dosis | Mariehamn | Released | 5 January 2026 | |
| 9 | FW | Pedro Conde | | Released | 10 January 2026 | |
| 8 | DM/MC/AM | Marko Brkljača | FC Victoria Rosport | Released | 15 January 2026 | |
| 12 | AML | Gboly Ariyibi | FK Radnički Niš | Released | 16 January 2026 | |
| 90 | FW | Nikos Tzovaras | Diagoras | Released | 29 January 2026 | |
| 77 | DM | Panagiotis Lygas | | Released | 4 February 2026 | |
| 49 | LB | Vasilis Pavlidis | Unia Skierniewice | Released | 25 February 2026 | |

== Pre-season and friendlies ==
Win Draw Loss Upcoming fixture

| 31 August 2025 Friendly | Anagennisi Arta | 0–0 | PAS Giannina | Arta |
| 18:00 | | Report Report | | Stadium: Arta Stadium; Referee: Konstantina Alevri |

| 8 September 2025 Friendly | AEK Athens | 2–0 | PAS Giannina | Spata |
| 11:00 | Martial (?); Kaloskamis (?) | Report | | Stadium: Spata Training Centre; Attendance: Behind closed doors |
Note: 70-minute match.

| 8 February 2026 Friendly | Panetolikos | 1–2 | PAS Giannina | Agrinio |
| 13:30 | Michalak 86' | Report | Vasilios Prekates 17'; Tourkochoritis (yellow card) 36'; Fiogbé 56' | Stadium: Emileon |

== Competitions ==
=== Super League 2 ===
==== League table ====
| Pos | Team | Pld | W | D | L | GF | GA | GD | Pts | Promotion or relegation (Note: PAOK B, Asteras Tripolis B are ineligible for promotion but eligible for relegation.) |
|---|---|---|---|---|---|---|---|---|---|---|
| 6 | Kavala | 18 | 6 | 5 | 7 | 16 | 22 | −6 | 23 | Qualification for the Play-out round |
| 7 | Nestos Chrysoupoli | 18 | 5 | 3 | 10 | 13 | 21 | −8 | 18 | Qualification for the Play-out round |
| 8 | Kampaniakos | 18 | 4 | 3 | 11 | 12 | 32 | −20 | 15 | Qualification for the Play-out round |
| 9 | PAS Giannina | 18 | 2 | 4 | 12 | 10 | 24 | −14 | 10 | Qualification for the Play-out round |
| 10 | Makedonikos | 18 | 1 | 3 | 14 | 8 | 37 | −29 | 6 | Qualification for the Play-out round |

Source: sl2.gr
Rules for classification: 1) Points; 2) Head-to-head points; 3) Head-to-head goal difference; 4) Goal difference; 5) Goals scored; 6) Goals against; 7) Play-offs (neutral ground); 8) Draw.
(Note: Criteria 7 is only used if needed to decide champion, teams for relegation).

==== Results summary ====
| Overall | | | | | | | | Home | | | | | | Away | | | | | |
| Pld | W | D | L | GF | GA | GD | Pts | W | D | L | GF | GA | GD | W | D | L | GF | GA | GD |
|---|---|---|---|---|---|---|---|---|---|---|---|---|---|---|---|---|---|---|---|
| 18 | 2 | 4 | 12 | 10 | 24 | −14 | 10 | 2 | 4 | 3 | 9 | 9 | 0 | 0 | 0 | 9 | 1 | 15 | −14 |

==== Fixtures ====
Win Draw Loss Upcoming fixture

| 14 September 2025 1 | Nestos Chrysoupoli | 1-0 | PAS Giannina | Drama |
| 17:00 | Theocharis Psaltis (yellow card) 63'; Lelekas 78' | Report Report | Tasos Symeonidis (yellow card) 21'; Tourkochoritis (yellow card) 83' | Stadium: Doxa Drama Stadium; Referee: Konstantinos Tsetsilas |

| 20 September 2025 2 | Makedonikos | 1-0 | PAS Giannina | Efkarpia |
| 17:00 | Georgios Kalaitzis (yellow card) 14'; Stefanos Gounaridis (yellow card) 30'; Spyros Saragiotis (yellow card) 39'; Vasilios Altintzis 60'; Nikolov (yellow card) 75' | Report Report | Kontonikos (yellow card) 18'; Rosario (yellow card) 30'; Panagiotou (yellow card) ?' | Stadium: Makedonikos Stadium; Referee: Fotios Daoulas |

| 27 September 2025 3 | PAS Giannina | 2–4 | PAOK B | Ioannina |
| 17:00 | Flores (yellow card) 37'; Rosario (yellow card) 40'; Selimaj (yellow card) 45'; Bullari 57' (pen.); Ariyibi 87'; Bullari (yellow card) ?' | Report Report | Mustmaa 20'; Kottas (yellow card) 24'; Mythou (yellow card) 30'; Mahamadou Balde 32', 45'; Dimitrios Bataoulas (yellow card) 43'; Tsopouroglou 52' (pen.); Monastirlis (yellow card) 89' | Stadium: Zosimades Stadium; Referee: Giorgos Tasiopoulos |

| 4 October 2025 4 | Niki Volos | 1-0 | PAS Giannina | Volos |
| 14:00 | Loukinas 25'; Christos Sioutas (yellow card) 54'; Tzanetopoulos (yellow card) 56' | Report Report | Vasilios Prekates (yellow card) 45'; Ariyibi (yellow card) 62'; Panagiotou (yellow card) 74' | Stadium: Niki Volos Stadium-Pantelis Magoulas; Referee: Thomas Mavridis |

| 12 October 2025 5 | PAS Giannina | 0–0 | Anagennisi Karditsas | Ioannina |
| 16:00 | Tasos Symeonidis (yellow card) 37'; Dimitris Naoumis (yellow card) 75'; Dosis (yellow card) 77'; Alexandros Doumas (yellow card) 88' | Report Report | Bousis (yellow card) ?'; Poletto (yellow card) 30'; Omrani (yellow card) 88' | Stadium: Zosimades Stadium; Referee: Anastasia Milopoulou |

| 19 October 2025 6 | PAS Giannina | 3–0 | Kampaniakos | Ioannina |
| 14:00 | Ariyibi 7', 78'; Dosis (yellow card) 23'; Ariyibi (yellow card) 38'; Dimitris Naoumis 39'; Alexandros Doumas (yellow card) 49'; Kryparakos (yellow card) 73'; Tourkochoritis (yellow card) 86'; Tasos Symeonidis (yellow card) ?' | Report Report | Georgios Papakonstantinou (yellow card) 19'; Papasterianos (yellow card) 62' | Stadium: Zosimades Stadium; Referee: Nikolaos Georgopoulos |

| 25 October 2025 7 | Asteras Tripolis B | 2-1 | PAS Giannina | Tripoli |
| 14:00 | Frroku 34'; Tereziou 4', 5+2'; Tereziou (yellow card) 56'; Alexandros Kedikoglou (yellow card) 75' | Report Report | Bullari 40'; Panagiotou (yellow card) 54'; Vasilios Prekates (yellow card) 76'; Rosario (yellow card) 76' | Stadium: Theodoros Kolokotronis Stadium; Referee: Vasilios Fitsas |

| 2 November 2025 8 | PAS Giannina | 0–0 | Kavala | Ioannina |
| 15:00 | Bullari (yellow card) 37'; Kontonikos (yellow card) 45+1'; Rosario (yellow card) 83' | Report Report | Manolis Aliatidis (yellow card) 45+1'; Sgouros (yellow card) 71'; Gavriilidis (yellow card) 85' | Stadium: Zosimades Stadium; Referee: Thomas Bourouzikas |

| 8 November 2025 9 | Iraklis | 4-0 | PAS Giannina | Thessaloniki |
| 14:00 | Katsikas (yellow card) 54'; Manalis 66', 82' (pen.); Durmishaj 74' (pen.); Orestis Tsintonis (yellow card) 78'; Kushta 89' | Report Report | Kontonikos (yellow card) 28'; Antzelo Sina (yellow card) 31' (yellow-red card) 70'; Kryparakos (yellow card) 49' | Stadium: Kaftanzoglio Stadium; Referee: Efstratios Machairas |

| 15 November 2025 10 | PAS Giannina | 0–1 | Nestos Chrysoupoli | Ioannina |
| 15:00 | Dosis (yellow card) 5'; Brkljača (yellow card) 67'; Panagiotou (yellow card) 82'; Conde (yellow card) ?' | Report Report | Donaldoni Zambou Nguemechieu (yellow card) 21'; Zisis Tsikos (yellow card) 33'; Glynos 66'; Dorian Fordos Harnish (yellow card) 70'; Pavlos Dermitzakis (yellow card) 76' | Stadium: Zosimades Stadium; Referee: Thomas Mavridis |

| 23 November 2025 11 | PAS Giannina | 1–0 | Makedonikos | Ioannina |
| 15:00 | Pavlidis (yellow card) 9'; Conde (yellow card) 53'; Bullari 63'; Brkljača (yellow card) 77'; Selimaj (yellow card) 82' | Report Report | Kapnidis (yellow card) 3'; Feizi Chasanoglou (yellow card) 39'; Georgios Kalaitzis (yellow card) 65'; Anastasios Amanatidis (yellow card) 82'; Christos Noulas (yellow card) 90' | Stadium: Zosimades Stadium; Referee: Dimitrios Kefalas |

| 29 November 2025 12 | PAOK B | 1-0 | PAS Giannina | Kalamaria,Thessaloniki |
| 15:00 | Giannis Gitersos (red card) 37'; Mustmaa (yellow card) 55'; Mahamadou Balde 67'; Kanis (yellow card) 89'; Vasilios Nikolakoulis (yellow card) 90+4' | Report Report | Tourkochoritis (yellow card) 13'; Bullari (yellow card) 71'; Tasos Symeonidis (yellow card) 81' | Stadium: Kalamaria Stadium; Referee: Giorgos Alatsakis |

| 6 December 2025 13 | PAS Giannina | 1–1 | Niki Volos | Ioannina |
| 15:00 | Bullari 55' | Report Report | Loukinas 17'; Kivrakidis (yellow card) 52'; Loukinas (yellow card) ?'; Salamouras (yellow card) ?' | Stadium: Zosimades Stadium; Referee: Eleni Antoniou |

| 14 December 2025 14 | Anagennisi Karditsas | 1-0 | PAS Giannina | Karditsa |
| 15:00 | Nikokyrakis 42'; Bousis (yellow card) 62'; Manousakis (yellow card) 87' | Report Report | Panagiotou (yellow card) 16'; Alexandros Doumas (yellow card) 70'; Kryparakos (yellow card) 90+1' | Stadium: Municipal Stadium of Karditsa; Referee: Athanasios Boutsikos |

| 20 December 2025 15 | Kampaniakos | 2-0 | PAS Giannina | Chalastra, Thessaloniki |
| 15:00 | Antonios Dermitzakis 10'; Stathis Sarvanidis (yellow card) 32'; Dimitrios Karadalis (yellow card) 45'; Doumanis 51'; Georgios Papakonstantinou (yellow card) 76' | Report Report | Bullari (yellow card) 32'; Tourkochoritis (yellow card) 43'; Vasilios Prekates (yellow card) 63'; Alexandros Doumas (yellow card) 78'; Antzelo Sina (yellow card) ?' | Stadium: Kampaniakos Stadium; Referee: Thomas Mavridis |

| 11 January 2026 16 | PAS Giannina | 1–1 | Asteras Tripolis B | Ioannina |
| 14:00 | Vasilios Prekates (yellow card) 24'; Bullari 43'; Panagiotis Lygas (yellow card) 52'; Agelos Papadopoulos (yellow card) 78' | Report Report | christos Almyras (yellow card) 23'; Bouloulis 34'; Alexandros Kedikoglou (yellow card) 80' | Stadium: Zosimades Stadium; Referee: Konstantinos Foustanas |

| 17 January 2026 17 | Kavala | 2-0 | PAS Giannina | Kavala |
| 15:00 | Rakip Bregu (yellow card) 43'; Manolis Aliatidis 56'; Sifneos 67'; Jakub Hrustinec (yellow card) 80' | Report Report | Steven Havales (yellow card) 34'; Giorgos Krimitzas (yellow card) 38'; Alexandros Doumas (yellow card) 75' | Stadium: Anthi Karagianni Stadium; Referee: Giorgos Papadopoulos |

| 24 January 2026 18 | PAS Giannina | 1–2 | Iraklis | Ioannina |
| 15:00 | Alexandros Doumas (yellow card) 13' (yellow-red card) 66'; Steven Havales (yellow card) 26'; Bullari (yellow card) 36'; Kontonikos 49' | Report Report | Manalis 15' (pen.); Katsikas (yellow card) 46'; Chakla (yellow card) 50'; Durmishaj 89' | Stadium: Zosimades Stadium; Referee: Panagiotis-Rafail Tsiaras |

=== Fixtures ===
Win Draw Loss Upcoming fixture

| 14 February 2026 1 | Makedonikos | 0-1 | PAS Giannina | Efkarpia |
| 15:00 | Karaberis (yellow card) 27' (yellow-red card) 76'; Paraskevas (yellow card) 31'; Cantave (yellow card) 34'; Anastasios Amanatidis (yellow card) 37'; Spyros Saragiotis (yellow card) 47' | Report Report | Dimitris Naoumis (yellow card) 20'; Kontonikos 23'; Bullari (yellow card) 29'; Tourkochoritis (yellow card) 67' | Stadium: Makedonikos Stadium; Referee: Vasilis Fitsas |

| 22 February 2026 2 | PAS Giannina | 1–2 | PAOK B | Ioannina |
| 15:00 | Bullari 4'; Dylan Tutonda (yellow card) 17'; Kasper Viramaki (yellow card) 23'; Kryparakos (yellow card) ?'; Andreas Panagiotakopoulos (yellow card) 73'; Thomas Vrakas (yellow card) 89'; Renild Kasemi (yellow card) 89' | Report Report | Giannis Gitersos 15'; Tsopouroglou (yellow card) 50'; Giannis Tsifoutis 81' | Stadium: Zosimades Stadium; Referee: Alexandros Megas |

| 28 February 2026 3 | Kavala | 3-0 | PAS Giannina | Kavala |
| 15:00 | Gavriilidis 1', 84'; Sifneos 44'; Rakip Bregu (yellow card) 55'; Katsoulidis (yellow card) 70' | Report Report | Kontonikos (yellow card) 23' (yellow-red card) 72'; Dimitris Naoumis (yellow card) 70'; Dylan Tutonda (yellow card) ?' | Stadium: Anthi Karagianni Stadium; Referee: Konstantinos Bairaktaris |

| 8 March 2026 4 | PAS Giannina | 0–0 | Nestos Chrysoupoli | Ioannina |
| 15:00 | Vasilios Prekates (yellow card) 9'; Giorgos Krimitzas (yellow card) 55'; Panagiotis Kafenzis (yellow card) 86' | Report Report | Kostika (yellow card) 58'; Eleftherios Gionis (red card) 64'; Aristidis Stavropoulos (yellow card) 71' | Stadium: Zosimades Stadium; Referee: Dimitris Kefalas |

| 14 March 2026 5 | Kampaniakos | 3-2 | PAS Giannina | Chalastra, Thessaloniki |
| 15:00 | Nikos Katharios 20'; Konstantinos Kastidis (yellow card) 23'; Georgios Garyfallos 30'; Ilias Moysidis 79'; Ilias Moysidis (yellow card) ?' | Report Report | Renild Kasemi 28' (pen.), 35'; Alexandros Doumas (yellow card) 49'; Kryparakos (yellow card) 89'; Renild Kasemi (yellow card) 90+4' | Stadium: Kampaniakos Stadium; Referee: Fotios Ntaoulas |

| 5 April 2026 6 | PAS Giannina | 2–2 | Makedonikos | Ioannina |
| 15:00 | Renild Kasemi 56'; Vasilios Prekates 78' | Report Report | Nikolaos Nikos 31'; Cantave 49'; Stefanos Gounaridis (yellow card) 76'; Lawal Sulaimon (yellow card) 77'; Nikos Karastergios (yellow card) ?' | Stadium: Zosimades Stadium; Referee: Andromachi Tsiofliki |

| 8 April 2026 7 | PAOK B | 2-1 | PAS Giannina | Kalamaria,Thessaloniki |
| 15:00 | Kottas (yellow card) 24'; Raihani 63'; Tsopouroglou (yellow card) ?'; Pedro Lucas (yellow card) 78'; Marios Kalaitsidis 89' | Report Report | Dimitris Naoumis (yellow card) 22' (yellow-red card) 27'; Fiogbé 33'; Giorgos Krimitzas (yellow card) 65' | Stadium: Kalamaria Stadium; Referee: Ioannis Tomaras |

| 18 April 2026 8 | PAS Giannina | 3–1 | Kavala | Ioannina |
| 15:00 | Kasper Viramaki (yellow card) 74'; Fiogbé 80', 90+2'; Dylan Tutonda (yellow card) 85'; Dylan Tutonda 89'; Alexandros Doumas (yellow card) ?' | Report Report | Jakub Hrustinec (yellow card) 28'; Rovas 82'; Gavriilidis (yellow card) ?' | Stadium: Zosimades Stadium; Referee: Konstantinos Safouris Argyropoulos |

| 22 April 2026 9 | Nestos Chrysoupoli | 1-0 | PAS Giannina | Chrysoupoli |
| 15:00 | Shea (yellow card) 43'; Konstantinos Vryzas 66'; Mubaraq Adeshina (yellow card) ?'; Manolakis (yellow card) ?'; Sapountzis (yellow card) ?' | Report Report | Renild Kasemi (yellow card) 50'; Kasper Viramaki (yellow card) 61'; Selimaj (yellow card) ?'; Konstantinos Ntekoumes (yellow card) ?' | Stadium: Municipal Stadium of Chrysoupoli; Referee: Giorgos Papadopoulos |

| 26 April 2026 10 | PAS Giannina | 4–3 | Kampaniakos | Ioannina |
| 15:00 | Bullari 1'; Vasilis Athanasiou 11'; Bullari (yellow card) 45+2'; Dylan Tutonda (yellow card) 50'; Alexandros Doumas 54'; Kryparakos 90+1' | Report Report | Chatzikyriakos (yellow card) 19'; Konstantinos Ntekoumes 32' (o.g.); Georgios Papakonstantinou 88'; Stathis Sarvanidis 90+3' (pen.); Georgios Papakonstantinou (yellow card) ?' | Stadium: Zosimades Stadium; Referee: Andromachi Tsiofliki |

=== Greek Cup ===
==== Matches ====
| 19 August 2025 Qualifying Round | PAS Giannina | 0-4 | Volos | Ioannina |
| 17:00 | | Report Report | Georgios Lagonidis (yellow card) 10'; Comba 7'; Diamanti Legisi 9'; Hamulić 77'; Joca 79' | Stadium: Zosimades Stadium; Referee: Meletis Goumatzidis |

== Statistics ==
=== Appearances ===
| No. | Pos. | Nat. | Name | Greek Super League 2 | Greek Cup | Total |
| No. | Pos. | Nat. | Name | Apps | Apps | Apps |
|---|---|---|---|---|---|---|
| 1 | GK | (Albania) (Greece) | Antzelo Sina | 10 | 0 | 10 |
| 2 | RB | (Greece) | Georgios Tourkochoritis | 19 | 0 | 19 |
| 3 | LB | (Albania) | Klaudio Balliu | 0 | 0 | 0 |
| 4 | CB | (Greece) | Alexandros Doumas | 21 | 1 | 22 |
| 5 | CB/DM | (Greece) | Panagiotis Kafenzis | 15 | 1 | 16 |
| 6 | DM/MC | (Greece) | Angelos Tsiris | 14 | 0 | 14 |
| 7 | MR/AMR | (Greece) | Vasilis Athanasiou | 12 | 1 | 13 |
| 8 | DM/MC/AM | (Croatia) | Marko Brkljača | 15 | 0 | 15 |
| 9 | FW | (Spain) | Pedro Conde | 9 | 0 | 9 |
| 10 | AM | (Costa Rica) | Dylan Flores | 9 | 0 | 9 |
| 11 | MC | (Greece) (Sweden) | Nikolaos Dosis | 10 | 0 | 10 |
| 12 | AML | (United States) (England) (Nigeria) | Gboly Ariyibi | 14 | 0 | 14 |
| 14 | GK | (Greece) | Christos Dimos | 2 | 0 | 2 |
| 15 | CB | (Finland) | Kasper Viramaki | 6 | 0 | 6 |
| 16 | CB | (Greece) | Panagiotis Panagiotou | 13 | 0 | 13 |
| 17 | AMLR | (Greece) (Albania) | Alexandros Elezi | 1 | 0 | 1 |
| 18 | AML | (Greece) | Christos Kryparakos | 23 | 0 | 23 |
| 19 | MC | (Greece) | Nikos Anagnostou | 0 | 1 | 1 |
| 20 | RB | (Greece) | Vasilis Kaperdas | 1 | 1 | 2 |
| 21 | LB | (Greece) | Dimitris Naoumis | 17 | 0 | 17 |
| 22 | RB | (Greece) | Alexandros Chaidos | 2 | 0 | 2 |
| 23 | MC | (Greece) | Panagiotis Chalatsis | 0 | 1 | 1 |
| 24 | FW | (Albania) (Greece) | Emiljano Bullari | 26 | 0 | 26 |
| 25 | GK | (Greece) | Ilias Grigoriou | 0 | 1 | 1 |
| 27 | AML | (Curaçao) (Netherlands) | Rayvien Rosario | 6 | 0 | 6 |
| 28 | AML | (Greece) | Andreas Panagiotakopoulos | 6 | 0 | 6 |
| 30 | FW | (Greece) | Vasilios Kontonikos | 21 | 0 | 21 |
| 31 | GK | (Greece) | Michail Ladias | 4 | 0 | 4 |
| 33 | CB | (Greece) (Australia) | Steven Havales | 6 | 0 | 6 |
| 42 | CB | (Greece) | Fotios Gogas | 0 | 1 | 1 |
| 44 | DM | (Switzerland) | Dylan Tutonda | 9 | 0 | 9 |
| 45 | FW | (Benin) | Candas Fiogbé | 7 | 0 | 7 |
| 49 | LB/CB | (Greece) | Vasilis Pavlidis | 6 | 0 | 6 |
| 66 | MR/RB | (Greece) | Konstantinos Ntekoumes | 5 | 1 | 6 |
| 74 | CB | (Greece) | Vasilios Prekates | 21 | 0 | 21 |
| 75 | LB | (Albania) (Greece) | Ermis Selimaj | 15 | 0 | 15 |
| 77 | DM | (Greece) | Panagiotis Lygas | 11 | 0 | 11 |
| 78 | DM/MC | (Greece) | Tasos Symeonidis | 14 | 0 | 14 |
| 79 | FW | (Greece) | Themis Patrinos | 20 | 0 | 20 |
| 80 | AM | (Greece) | Agelos Papadopoulos | 5 | 0 | 5 |
| 83 | LB | (Greece) | Eleftherios Grestas | 4 | 1 | 5 |
| 87 | RB | (Greece) | Vasilios Kitsakis | 8 | 0 | 8 |
| 88 | MC/AM | (Albania) (Greece) | Renild Kasemi | 12 | 0 | 12 |
| 90 | FW | (Greece) | Nikos Tzovaras | 0 | 1 | 1 |
| 96 | AM | (Greece) | Dimitris Floros | 1 | 1 | 2 |
| 98 | DM | (Greece) | Giorgos Krimitzas | 8 | 0 | 8 |
| 99 | GK | (Greece) | Thomas Vrakas | 13 | 0 | 13 |

=== Goalscorers ===
| No. | Pos. | Nat. | Name | Greek Super League 2 | Greek Cup | Total |
| No. | Pos. | Nat. | Name | Goals | Goals | Goals |
|---|---|---|---|---|---|---|
| 24 | FW | (Albania) (Greece) | Emiljano Bullari | 7 | 0 | 7 |
| 12 | AML | (United States) (England) (Nigeria) | Gboly Ariyibi | 3 | 0 | 3 |
| 88 | MC/AM | (Albania) (Greece) | Renild Kasemi | 3 | 0 | 3 |
| 45 | FW | (Benin) | Candas Fiogbé | 3 | 0 | 3 |
| 30 | FW | (Greece) | Vasilios Kontonikos | 2 | 0 | 2 |
| 4 | CB | (Greece) | Alexandros Doumas | 1 | 0 | 1 |
| 74 | CB | (Greece) | Vasilios Prekates | 1 | 0 | 1 |
| 7 | MR/AMR | (Greece) | Vasilis Athanasiou | 1 | 0 | 1 |
| 18 | AML | (Greece) | Christos Kryparakos | 1 | 0 | 1 |
| 21 | LB | (Greece) | Dimitris Naoumis | 1 | 0 | 1 |
| 44 | DM | (Switzerland) | Dylan Tutonda | 1 | 0 | 1 |

=== Clean sheets ===
| No. | Pos. | Nat. | Name | Greek Super League 2 | Greek Cup | Total |
| No. | Pos. | Nat. | Name | CS | CS | CS |
|---|---|---|---|---|---|---|
| 1 | GK | (Albania) (Greece) | Antzelo Sina | 3 (10) | 0 (0) | 3 (10) |
| 14 | GK | (Greece) | Christos Dimos | 0 (2) | 0 (0) | 0 (2) |
| 25 | GK | (Greece) | Ilias Grigoriou | 0 (0) | 0 (1) | 0 (1) |
| 31 | GK | (Greece) | Michail Ladias | 0 (4) | 0 (0) | 0 (4) |
| 99 | GK | (Greece) | Thomas Vrakas | 3 (13) | 0 (0) | 3 (13) |

=== Disciplinary record ===
| S | P | N | Name | Super League 2 | | | Play outs | | | Greek Cup | | | Total | | |
| S | P | N | Name | Yellow card | Yellow-red card | Red card | Yellow card | Yellow-red card | Red card | Yellow card | Yellow-red card | Red card | Yellow card | Yellow-red card | Red card |
|---|---|---|---|---|---|---|---|---|---|---|---|---|---|---|---|
| 1 | GK | (Albania) (Greece) | Antzelo Sina | 1 | 1 | 0 | 0 | 0 | 0 | 0 | 0 | 0 | 1 | 1 | 0 |
| 2 | RB | (Greece) | Georgios Tourkochoritis | 4 | 0 | 0 | 1 | 0 | 0 | 0 | 0 | 0 | 5 | 0 | 0 |
| 4 | CB | (Greece) | Alexandros Doumas | 5 | 1 | 0 | 2 | 0 | 0 | 0 | 0 | 0 | 7 | 1 | 0 |
| 5 | CB/DM | (Greece) | Panagiotis Kafenzis | 0 | 0 | 0 | 1 | 0 | 0 | 0 | 0 | 0 | 1 | 0 | 0 |
| 8 | DM/MC/AM | (Croatia) | Marko Brkljača | 2 | 0 | 0 | 0 | 0 | 0 | 0 | 0 | 0 | 2 | 0 | 0 |
| 9 | FW | (Spain) | Pedro Conde | 2 | 0 | 0 | 0 | 0 | 0 | 0 | 0 | 0 | 2 | 0 | 0 |
| 10 | AM | (Costa Rica) | Dylan Flores | 1 | 0 | 0 | 0 | 0 | 0 | 0 | 0 | 0 | 1 | 0 | 0 |
| 11 | MC | (Greece) (Sweden) | Nikolaos Dosis | 3 | 0 | 0 | 0 | 0 | 0 | 0 | 0 | 0 | 3 | 0 | 0 |
| 12 | AML | (United States) (England) (Nigeria) | Gboly Ariyibi | 2 | 0 | 0 | 0 | 0 | 0 | 0 | 0 | 0 | 2 | 0 | 0 |
| 15 | CB | (Finland) | Kasper Viramaki | 0 | 0 | 0 | 3 | 0 | 0 | 0 | 0 | 0 | 3 | 0 | 0 |
| 16 | CB | (Greece) | Panagiotis Panagiotou | 5 | 0 | 0 | 0 | 0 | 0 | 0 | 0 | 0 | 5 | 0 | 0 |
| 18 | AML | (Greece) | Christos Kryparakos | 3 | 0 | 0 | 2 | 0 | 0 | 0 | 0 | 0 | 5 | 0 | 0 |
| 21 | LB | (Greece) | Dimitris Naoumis | 1 | 0 | 0 | 2 | 1 | 0 | 0 | 0 | 0 | 3 | 1 | 0 |
| 24 | FW | (Albania) (Greece) | Emiljano Bullari | 5 | 0 | 0 | 2 | 0 | 0 | 0 | 0 | 0 | 7 | 0 | 0 |
| 27 | AML | (Curaçao) (Netherlands) | Rayvien Rosario | 4 | 0 | 0 | 0 | 0 | 0 | 0 | 0 | 0 | 4 | 0 | 0 |
| 28 | AML | (Greece) | Andreas Panagiotakopoulos | 0 | 0 | 0 | 1 | 0 | 0 | 0 | 0 | 0 | 1 | 0 | 0 |
| 30 | FW | (Greece) | Vasilios Kontonikos | 3 | 0 | 0 | 0 | 1 | 0 | 0 | 0 | 0 | 3 | 1 | 0 |
| 33 | CB | (Greece) (Australia) | Steven Havales | 2 | 0 | 0 | 0 | 0 | 0 | 0 | 0 | 0 | 2 | 0 | 0 |
| 44 | DM | (Switzerland) | Dylan Tutonda | 0 | 0 | 0 | 4 | 0 | 0 | 0 | 0 | 0 | 4 | 0 | 0 |
| 49 | LB/CB | (Greece) | Vasilis Pavlidis | 1 | 0 | 0 | 0 | 0 | 0 | 0 | 0 | 0 | 1 | 0 | 0 |
| 66 | MR/RB | (Greece) | Konstantinos Ntekoumes | 0 | 0 | 0 | 1 | 0 | 0 | 0 | 0 | 0 | 1 | 0 | 0 |
| 74 | CB | (Greece) | Vasilios Prekates | 4 | 0 | 0 | 1 | 0 | 0 | 0 | 0 | 0 | 5 | 0 | 0 |
| 75 | LB | (Albania) (Greece) | Ermis Selimaj | 2 | 0 | 0 | 1 | 0 | 0 | 0 | 0 | 0 | 3 | 0 | 0 |
| 77 | DM | (Greece) | Panagiotis Lygas | 1 | 0 | 0 | 0 | 0 | 0 | 0 | 0 | 0 | 1 | 0 | 0 |
| 78 | DM/MC | (Greece) | Tasos Symeonidis | 4 | 0 | 0 | 0 | 0 | 0 | 0 | 0 | 0 | 4 | 0 | 0 |
| 80 | AM | (Greece) | Agelos Papadopoulos | 1 | 0 | 0 | 0 | 0 | 0 | 0 | 0 | 0 | 1 | 0 | 0 |
| 88 | MC/AM | (Albania) (Greece) | Renild Kasemi | 0 | 0 | 0 | 3 | 0 | 0 | 0 | 0 | 0 | 3 | 0 | 0 |
| 98 | DM | (Greece) | Giorgos Krimitzas | 1 | 0 | 0 | 2 | 0 | 0 | 0 | 0 | 0 | 3 | 0 | 0 |
| 99 | GK | (Greece) | Thomas Vrakas | 0 | 0 | 0 | 1 | 0 | 0 | 0 | 0 | 0 | 1 | 0 | 0 |
