= List of Greek football transfers summer 2025 =

Greek football transfers summer 2025

This page lists all player transfers in Greek association football during the summer of 2025.

== Greek Super League ==
=== AEK Athens ===
In:

No.	Pos.	Nation	Player
—	MF	GRE	Dimitris Kaloskamis (from Atromitos)
—	DF	POR	Filipe Relvas (from (Portugal) Vitória Guimarães)
—	MF	ROU	Răzvan Marin (from (Italy) Cagliari)
—	MF	SUI	Dereck Kutesa (from (Switzerland) Servette)
—	FW	GRE	Michalis Kosidis (loan return from (Poland) Puszcza Niepołomice)

Out:

No.	Pos.	Nation	Player
—	FW	GRE	Sotiris Tsiloulis (to Atromitos)
—	FW	GRE	Michalis Kosidis (to (Poland) Zagłębie Lubin)

=== A.E. Kifisia ===
In:

No.	Pos.	Nation	Player

Out:

No.	Pos.	Nation	Player

=== AEL ===
In:

No.	Pos.	Nation	Player
4	DF	MAR	Sofian Chakla (from (Azerbaijan) Sabah)

Out:

No.	Pos.	Nation	Player

=== Aris ===
In:

No.	Pos.	Nation	Player
—	DF	SEN	Noah Fadiga (from (Belgium) KAA Gent)
—	DF	ESP	Álvaro Tejero (from (Spain) Espanyol)
—	DF	GAM	Noah Sonko Sundberg (loan from (Bulgaria) Ludogorets Razgrad)
—	MF	ENG	Tasos Donis (from (Cyprus) APOEL)
—	MF	POR	Pedro Álvaro (from (Portugal) Estoril)
—	FW	GRE	Giannis Gianniotas (from Levadiakos)
—	GK	GRE	Giorgos Athanasiadis (from (Cyprus) AEK Larnaca)
—	GK	CRO	Lovro Majkić (from (Croatia) Istra 1961)
—	MF	FIN	Fredrik Jensen (from (Germany) FC Augsburg)
—	MF	SRB	Uroš Račić (from (Italy) Sassuolo)
—	FW	ESP	Carles Pérez (Loan from (Spain) Celta)

Out:

No.	Pos.	Nation	Player
—	DF	ESP	Hugo Mallo (Released)
—	FW	GRE	Giannis Fetfatzidis (Retired)
—	FW	SRB	Uroš Račić (Retired)
—	GK	GRE	Konstantinos Kyriazis (to (Spain) Conquense)

=== Asteras Tripolis ===
In:

No.	Pos.	Nation	Player
—	FW	GRE	Dimitrios Emmanouilidis (from (Denmark) Vejle)

Out:

No.	Pos.	Nation	Player

=== Atromitos ===
In:

No.	Pos.	Nation	Player
—	DF	FIN	Jere Uronen (on loan from (Sweden) AIK)

Out:

No.	Pos.	Nation	Player

=== Levadiakos ===
In:

No.	Pos.	Nation	Player

Out:

No.	Pos.	Nation	Player
—	MF	ISR	Aviv Avraham (to (Israel) Hapoel Ironi Kiryat Shmona)

=== OFI ===
In:

No.	Pos.	Nation	Player
—	MF	ITA	Eddie Salcedo (from (Italy) Inter)

Out:

No.	Pos.	Nation	Player
23	GK	BUL	Daniel Naumov (to (Bulgaria) Botev Plovdiv)

=== Olympiacos ===
In:

No.	Pos.	Nation	Player
—	MF	BRA	Gabriel Strefezza (from (Italy) Como)
—	FW	GRE	Georgios Masouras (Loan return from (Germany) VfL Bochum)

Out:

No.	Pos.	Nation	Player
—	DF	ISR	Doron Leidner (on loan to (Israel) Hapoel Tel Aviv)
—	MF	GRE	Nikos Athanasiou (on loan to (Portugal) Rio Ave)
—	MF	GRE	Antonis Papakanellos (on loan to (Portugal) Rio Ave)

=== Panathinaikos ===
In:

No.	Pos.	Nation	Player
—	DF	ITA	Davide Calabria (from (Italy) AC Milan)
—	MF	ALG	Ahmed Touba (from (Turkey) İstanbul Başakşehir)
—	MF	GRE	Giorgos Kyriakopoulos (from (Italy) Monza)
—	MF	ESP	Pedro Chirivella (from (France) Nantes)
—	MF	MAR	Anass Zaroury (from (France) Lens)

Out:

No.	Pos.	Nation	Player
—	GK	RUS	Yuri Lodygin (to Levadiakos)
—	DF	GRE	Georgios Vagiannidis (to (Portugal) Sporting CP)
—	MF	POR	Zeca (Retired)
—	MF	NED	Bart Schenkeveld (Released)
—	MF	ESP	Rubén Pérez (to A.E. Kifisia)
—	DF	ISL	Hörður Magnússon (Released)
—	MF	BRA	Willian Arão (to (Brazil) Santos)
—	MF	ALB	Klidman Lilo (to OFI)
—	MF	ALB	Enis Çokaj (to Levadiakos)
—	MF	GRE	Dimitrios Limnios (Loan to (Netherlands) Fortuna Sittard)
—	MF	SRB	Nemanja Maksimović (to (United Arab Emirates) Shabab Al Ahli Club)

=== Panetolikos ===
In:

No.	Pos.	Nation	Player
—	MF	ESP	Jorge Aguirre (Loan from (Portugal) Gil Vicente)

Out:

No.	Pos.	Nation	Player

=== Panserraikos ===
In:

No.	Pos.	Nation	Player

Out:

No.	Pos.	Nation	Player

=== PAOK ===
In:

No.	Pos.	Nation	Player
—	DF	GRE	Lefteris Lyratzis (loan return from (Denmark) NEC)
—	DF	SCO	Greg Taylor (from (Scotland) Celtic)
—	MF	FRA	Soualiho Meïté (from (Portugal) Benfica)
—	FW	CRO	Luka Ivanušec (from (Netherlands) Feyenoord)
—	FW	GRE	Giorgos Giakoumakis (Loan from (Mexico) Cruz Azul)

Out:

No.	Pos.	Nation	Player
—	GK	CRO	Dominik Kotarski (to (Denmark) Copenhagen)
—	DF	POR	Vieirinha (Retired)
—	DF	MEX	Jonathan Gómez (to (Spain) Albacete)
—	DF	GRE	Lefteris Lyratzis (loan to Panserraikos)
—	MF	PER	Sergio Peña (to (Peru) Alianza Lima)
—	MF	ESP	Jonny Otto (to (Spain) Alavés)
—	MF	AUT	Stefan Schwab (from (Germany) Holstein Kiel)
—	FW	MAR	Filipe Relvas (Loan to (United Arab Emirates) Khor Fakkan)
—	FW	TAN	Mbwana Samatta (to (France) Le Havre)
—	FW	ESP	Brandon Thomas (to (Cyprus) Apollon Limassol)

=== Volos ===
In:

No.	Pos.	Nation	Player
—	DF	ANG	Núrio Fortuna (loan from Gent)
—	MF	GRE	Lazaros Lamprou (from (Poland) Raków Częstochowa)
—	FW	TUN	Nabil Makni (from (Bulgaria) Hebar)

Out:

No.	Pos.	Nation	Player
—	GK	HUN	Dániel Kovács (to (Hungary) Nyíregyháza)
—	DF	SWE	Daniel Sundgren (to (Sweden) Degerfors)

== Super League Greece 2 ==
=== Anagennisi Karditsa ===
In:

No.	Pos.	Nation	Player

Out:

No.	Pos.	Nation	Player

=== Asteras Tripolis B ===
In:

No.	Pos.	Nation	Player

Out:

No.	Pos.	Nation	Player

=== Athens Kallithea ===
In:

No.	Pos.	Nation	Player
—	DF	POL	Wiktor Matyjewicz (loan return from (Poland) Bruk-Bet Termalica)

Out:

No.	Pos.	Nation	Player
—	DF	GRE	Nikos Kenourgios (to (Armenia) Pyunik Yerevan)
—	DF	VEN	Josua Mejías (to (Hungary) Debrecen)
19	MF	SEN	Mor Ndiaye (to (Poland) Pogoń Szczecin)

=== Chania ===
In:

No.	Pos.	Nation	Player

Out:

No.	Pos.	Nation	Player

=== Egaleo ===
In:

No.	Pos.	Nation	Player

Out:

No.	Pos.	Nation	Player

=== Hellas Syros ===
In:

No.	Pos.	Nation	Player

Out:

No.	Pos.	Nation	Player

=== Ilioupoli ===
In:

No.	Pos.	Nation	Player

Out:

No.	Pos.	Nation	Player

=== Iraklis ===
In:

No.	Pos.	Nation	Player

Out:

No.	Pos.	Nation	Player
74	FW	GRE	Theodoros Tsirigotis (to (Poland) Górnik Zabrze)

=== Kalamata ===
In:

No.	Pos.	Nation	Player

Out:

No.	Pos.	Nation	Player

=== Kampaniakos ===
In:

No.	Pos.	Nation	Player

Out:

No.	Pos.	Nation	Player

=== Kavala ===
In:

No.	Pos.	Nation	Player

Out:

No.	Pos.	Nation	Player

=== Makedonikos ===
In:

No.	Pos.	Nation	Player

Out:

No.	Pos.	Nation	Player
—	MF	COL	Santiago Montoya (to (Bulgaria) Sevlievo)

=== Marko ===
In:

No.	Pos.	Nation	Player

Out:

No.	Pos.	Nation	Player

=== Nestos Chrysoupoli ===
In:

No.	Pos.	Nation	Player

Out:

No.	Pos.	Nation	Player

=== Niki Volos ===
In:

No.	Pos.	Nation	Player

Out:

No.	Pos.	Nation	Player

=== Olympiacos B ===
In:

No.	Pos.	Nation	Player

Out:

No.	Pos.	Nation	Player

=== Panachaiki F.C. ===
In:

No.	Pos.	Nation	Player

Out:

No.	Pos.	Nation	Player
—	DF	GRE	Nikolaos Masouras (to (Bulgaria) Sevlievo)
—	DF	GRE	Christoforos Karagiannis (to (Bulgaria) Sevlievo)
—	FW	GRE	Minas Chalkiadakis (to (Bulgaria) Sevlievo)

=== Panargiakos ===
In:

No.	Pos.	Nation	Player

Out:

No.	Pos.	Nation	Player

=== Panionios ===
In:

No.	Pos.	Nation	Player

Out:

No.	Pos.	Nation	Player

=== PAOK B ===
In:

No.	Pos.	Nation	Player

Out:

No.	Pos.	Nation	Player

=== PAS Giannina ===
In:

No.	Pos.	Nation	Player
—	GK	ALB	Antzelo Sina (Loan from (Portugal) Rio Ave)
—	GK	GRE	Christos Dimos (From Ethnikos Piraeus)
—	DF	GRE	Alexandros Chaidos (From GS Ilioupolis)
—	DF	GRE	Georgios Tourkochoritis (From Asteras Tripolis B)
—	DF	GRE	Vasilios Pavlidis (From AEK Athens B)
—	DF	GRE	Ermis Selimaj (from AEK Athens B)
—	DF	GRE	Ermis Selimaj (from AEK Athens B)
—	DF	GRE	Klaudio Balliu (from Iraklis)
—	MF	GRE	Vasilios Prekates (Loan from Olympiacos B)
—	MF	GRE	Tasos Symeonidis (From PAOK Kristoni)
—	MF	GRE	Panagiotis Panagiotou (From Ethnikos Achna)
—	MF	GRE	Panagiotis Lygas (From Panargiakos)
—	MF	CRC	Dylan Flores (From (Guatemala) Marquense)
—	MF	CRO	Marko Brkljača (From (Croatia) Dinamo Zagreb)
—	MF	GRE	Nikolaos Dosis (From Volos)
—	MF	NED	Rayvien Rosario (From (Netherlands) Excelsior)
—	MF	GRE	Christos Kryparakos (Loan from Panathinaikos)
—	MF	GRE	Alexandros Elezi (Loan from AEK Athens)
—	MF	USA	Gboly Ariyibi (From (Portugal) Boavista)
—	FW	ESP	Pedro Conde (From Volos)
—	FW	GRE	Vasilios Kontonikos (Loan from Volos)
—	FW	GRE	Vasilios Kontonikos (Loan from AEK Athens)
—	FW	GRE	Emiljano Bullari (Loan from (Albania) KF Laçi)

Out:

No.	Pos.	Nation	Player
—	GK	GRE	Vasilis Athanasiou (Released)
—	GK	GRE	Panagiotis Ginis (to Hellas Syros)
—	DF	GRE	Xenofon Panos (to (Cyprus) Olympiakos Nicosia)
—	DF	GRE	Gerasimos Bakadimas (to (Cyprus) Ethnikos Neo Keramidi)
—	DF	GRE	Xenofon Panos (Released)
—	MF	GRE	Alexandros Lolis (to Niki Volos)
—	MF	GER	Moritz Heinrich (to Iraklis)|
—	MF	GER	Tim Rieder (to (Germany) VSG Altglienicke)
—	MF	GRE	Orestis Kalemi (to (Slovakia) MFK Zemplín Michalovce)
—	MF	GRE	Vasilios Mantzis (to Kalamata)
—	FW	GRE	Iason Kyrkos (to Volos)
—	FW	GRE	Alexandros Nikolias (to Anagennisi Karditsa)
—	FW	FRA	Jean-Baptiste Léo (to Panserraikos)

== Gamma Ethniki ==
=== Iraklis ===
In:

No.	Pos.	Nation	Player

Out:

No.	Pos.	Nation	Player
74	FW	GRE	Theodoros Tsirigotis (to (Poland) Górnik Zabrze)

=== PAS Lamia ===
In:

No.	Pos.	Nation	Player

Out:

No.	Pos.	Nation	Player
14	FW	BRA	Gustavo Furtado (to (Russia) Krasnodar)

== Dissolved ==
=== AEK Athens B ===
In:

No.	Pos.	Nation	Player
—	DF	GRE	Alexandros Malis (from Ararat-Armenia)

Out:

No.	Pos.	Nation	Player

== See also ==
- 2025–26 Super League Greece
- 2025–26 Super League Greece 2
- 2025–26 Gamma Ethniki
