= 2026–27 PAS Giannina F.C. season =

PAS Giannina
2026–27 season
- Manager: Christos Raptis
- Stadium: Zosimades Stadium, Ioannina
Home colours	Away colours	Third colours

The 2026–27 season is PAS Giannina F.C.'s 4th competitive season in the third division of Greek football, and 61st year in existence as a football club. They also compete in the Greek Amateur Cup.

== Players ==
Updated:

No.	Name	Nationality	Position(s)	Place of birth	Date of birth	Signed from	Notes
Goalkeepers
1	Nikolaos Koliofoukas	(Greece)	GK	Ioannina, Greece	11 September 1996	(Germany) SV Wilhelmshaven	
30	Ioannis Botsaris	(Greece)	GK	Igoumenitsa, Greece	20 March 2001	(Greece) AO Trikala	
	Theocharis Bantavelis	(Greece)	GK		2010	(Greece) PAS Giannina U17	
Defenders
2	Vasilios Kitsakis	(Greece)	RB	Ioannina, Greece	24 January 2004	(Greece) PAOK B	
3	Orestis Sintos	(Greece)	LB	Ioannina, Greece	12 July 2009	(Greece) PAS Acheron Kanallaki	
4	Eleftherios Grestas	(Greece)	LB	Ioannina, Greece	10 December 2008	(Greece) Aris Filiates	
5	Panagiotis Kafenzis	(Greece)	CB/DM	Ioannina, Greece	5 October 2005	(Greece) PAS Giannina U19	
12	Giorgos Vergos	(Greece)			2008	(Greece) PAS Giannina U19	
14	Fotios Gogas	(Greece)	CB	Ioannina, Greece	22 March 2008	(Greece) PAS Giannina U19	
17	Konstantinos Zdravos (VC)	(Greece)	RB	Ioannina, Greece	16 August 1993	(Greece) Tilykratis Lefkada	
22	Ilias Lazaridis	(Greece)	CB	Kozani, Greece	10 September 2003	(Greece) Panargiakos	
Midfielders
6	Vasilis Tsiamis	(Greece)	DM	Trikala, Greece	5 August 2006	(Greece) Proodos Rogon	
7	Stathis Belevonis	(Greece)	DM/RB	Agrinio, Greece	6 February 1998	(Greece) Ilisiakos	
8	Charalabos Panos	(Greece)	LW	Ioannina, Greece	2 April 2004	(Greece) Panargiakos	
9	Christos Gogos	(Greece)	AM	Ioannina, Greece	2008	(Greece) PAS Giannina U19	
10	Evripidis Giakos (Captain)	(Greece)	CM / CF	Ioannina, Greece	9 April 1991	(Greece) Panaigialios	
11	Savvas Siatravanis	(Greece)	LW	Larissa, Greece	24 November 1992	(Greece) AEL	
13	Stefanos Barlis	(Greece)	DM	Ioannina, Greece	2010	(Greece) PAS Giannina U17	
16	Giannis Tsiatouras	(Greece)			2009	(Greece) PAS Giannina U19	
18	Konstantinos Katerinis	(Greece)	MF	Ioannina, Greece	3 August 2010	(Greece) PAS Giannina U17	
20	Konstantinos Ntekoumes	(Greece)	MR	Ioannina, Greece	3 March 2008	(Greece) PAS Giannina U19	
21	Alexandros Ferentinos	(Greece)	AMR	Igoumenitsa, Greece	18 November 2004	(Greece) Aris Filiates	
24	Thomas Potsis	(Greece)	DM	Ioannina, Greece	29 January 2001	(Greece) Aris Filiates	
Forwards
19	Nikos Tzovaras	(Greece)	FW	Ioannina, Greece	26 February 2007	(Greece) Diagoras	
25	Panagiotis Ballas	(Greece)	FW	Volos, Greece	16 July 2003	(Greece) Anagennisi Karditsa	
Left during Winter Transfer Window
16	Nikos Foukis	(Greece)	AM	Ioannina, Greece	2008	(Greece) PAS Giannina U19	

=== International players ===
- (Greece) Vasilios Kitsakis (U19/17)

=== Foreign players ===
EU Nationals

EU Nationals (Dual Citizenship)

Non-EU Nationals

== Personnel ==
=== Management ===
The administration of the club is entrusted to the governing committee of the amateur club. The committee is chaired by Charis Lazanis.The other members of the committee are Dimitris Petalis, Thanasis Charisis, Pavlos Miaris, and Manos Papadopoulos.The president of the amateur club is Napoleon Tsakanelis, who has held the position since 28 May 2026.

=== Football Department ===
Position	Staff
Team Manager	Giorgos Dasios

=== Coaching staff ===
Position	Name
Head Coach	Christos Raptis
Assistant Coach	Spyros Kalogirou
Coach	
Fitness Coach	Dimitris Charisis
Goalkeepers Coach	Nikos Spiridis
Analyst	Spyros Kalogirou

=== Medical staff ===
Position	Name
Head doctor	Stavros Ristanis
Physio	Vagelis Stathis

=== Academy ===
Position	Name
Head of youth development	Giorgos Dasios

== Transfers ==
=== Summer ===
==== In ====
No	Pos	Player	Transferred from	Fee	Date	Source
1	GK	Nikolaos Koliofoukas	SV Wilhelmshaven	Free	8 July 2026	
3	LB	Orestis Sintos	PAS Acheron Kanallaki	Loan return	10 July 2026	
24	DM	Thomas Potsis	Aris Filiates	Free	10 July 2026	
21	AMR	Alexandros Ferentinos	Aris Filiates	Free	13 July 2026	
17	RB	Konstantinos Zdravos	Tilykratis Lefkada	Free	14 July 2026	
19	FW	Nikos Tzovaras	Diagoras	Free	15 July 2026	
16	AM	Nikos Foukis	PAS Giannina U19	Promotion	18 July 2026	
9	AM	Christos Gogos	PAS Giannina U19	Promotion	18 July 2026	
6	DM	Vasilis Tsiamis	Proodos Rogon	Free	21 July 2026	
13	DM	Stefanos Barlis	PAS Giannina U17	Free	22 July 2026	
11	LW	Savvas Siatravanis	AEL	Free	28 July 2026	
7	DM/RB	Stathis Belevonis	Ilisiakos	Free	29 July 2026	
22	CB	Ilias Lazaridis	Panargiakos	Free	2 August 2026	
8	LW	Charalabos Panos	Panargiakos	Free	2 August 2026	
18	MF	Konstantinos Katerinis	PAS Giannina U17	Free	3 August 2026	
25	FW	Panagiotis Ballas	Anagennisi Karditsa	Free	14 August 2026	
30	GK	Ioannis Botsaris	AO Trikala	Free	14 August 2026	
	GK	Theocharis Bantavelis	PAS Giannina U17	Free	26 September 2026	
12		Giorgos Vergos	PAS Giannina U19	Free	26 September 2026	
16		Giannis Tsiatouras	PAS Giannina U19	Free	26 September 2026	
10	AM	Evripidis Giakos	Panaigialios	Free	15 October 2026	
4	LB	Eleftherios Grestas	Aris Filiates	Free	17 November 2026	

==== Out ====
No	Pos	Player	Transferred to	Fee	Date	Source
20	RB	Vasilis Kaperdas	AO Ampelokipoi Ioannina	Free	11 June 2026	
99	GK	Thomas Vrakas	Pannaxiakos	Free	26 June 2026	
1	GK	Antzelo Sina	Rio Ave	End of loan	30 June 2026	
74	CB	Vasilios Prekates	Olympiacos B	End of loan	30 June 2026	
18	AML	Christos Kryparakos	Panathinaikos	End of loan	30 June 2026	
30	FW	Vasilios Kontonikos	AEK Athens	End of loan	30 June 2026	
45	FW	Candas Fiogbé	Atalanta U23	End of loan	30 June 2026	
28	AML	Andreas Panagiotakopoulos	Marko	Free	13 July 2026	
19	MC	Nikos Anagnostou	PAOK U17	Free	14 July 2026	
4	CB	Alexandros Doumas	Olympiakos Nicosia	Free	19 July 2026	
24	FW	Emiljano Bullari	Hellas Syros	Free	20 July 2026	
88	MC/AM	Renild Kasemi	Nestos Chrysoupoli	Free	21 July 2026	
44	DM	Dylan Tutonda	Nestos Chrysoupoli	Free	29 July 2026	
		Panagiotis Tsiotis	Thyella Katsikas	Loan	1 August 2026	
79	FW	Themis Patrinos	Apollon Kalamarias	Free	8 August 2026	
78	DM/MC	Tasos Symeonidis	Giouchtas	Free	12 August 2026	
21	LB	Dimitris Naoumis	Kalamata	Free	26 August 2026	
6	DM/MC	Angelos Tsiris	Iraklis Thermaikos	Free	26 August 2026	
83	LB	Eleftherios Grestas	Aris Filiates	Free	30 August 2026	
7	MR/AMR	Vasilis Athanasiou	Apollon Kalamarias	Free	3 September 2026	
80	AM	Agelos Papadopoulos	Megas Alexandros Florina	Free	5 September 2026	
31	GK	Michail Ladias	Panakrotiriakos	Free	9 September 2026	
33	CB	Steven Havales	Bray Wanderers F.C.	Free	11 September 2026	
75	LB	Ermis Selimaj	KF Llapi	Free	25 September 2026	
96	AM	Dimitris Floros		Free		
98	DM	Giorgos Krimitzas		Free		
2	RB	Georgios Tourkochoritis		Free		
15	CB	Kasper Viramaki		Free		
16	AM	Nikos Foukis	AO Ampelokipoi	Loan	4 November 2026	

== Pre-season and friendlies ==
Win Draw Loss Upcoming fixture

13 August 2026 Friendly	PAS Giannina	0-0	AE Giannena	Ioannina
18:30		Report		Stadium: PEAKI; Referee: Vlachos

23 August 2026 Friendly	Kastoria 1980	0–1	PAS Giannina	Kastoria
18:30		Report Report	Vasilis Tsiamis 78'	Stadium: Kastoria Municipal Stadium; Referee: D. Stiliadis

29 August 2026 Friendly	AO Anatoli	1–3	PAS Giannina	Anatoli
19:00	G. Christakopoulos 73'	Report Report	Charalabos Panos 15', 55'; Panagiotis Ballas 36'	Stadium: Anatoli stadium Referee: Spiros Zabalas

5 September 2026 Friendly	Pindos Konitsa	0–6	PAS Giannina	Konitsa
18:00		Report Report	Siatravanis 11'; Belevonis 38'; Vasilis Tsiamis 58', 79'; Nikos Tzovaras 74'; Nikos Foukis 89' (pen.)	Stadium: Konitsa Municipal Stadium; Referee: Dimitris Chatzipanagiotou

5 September 2026 Friendly	Makedonikos Siatista	2–2	PAS Giannina	Siatista
18:00	Maximos Gargas 31'; Markos Bourtzos 83'	Report Report	Christos Kokkinidis 34' (o.g.); Panagiotis Kafenzis 36'	Stadium: Siatista Municipal Stadium; Referee: Nikolaos Koutsonas

== Competitions ==
=== Gamma Ethniki ===
==== Fixtures ====
Win Draw Loss Upcoming fixture

27 September 2026 1	PAS Giannina	0–0	Anagennisi Arta	Ioannina
16:00	Konstantinos Zdravos (yellow card) 40'	Report Report	Tsoutsis (yellow card) 60'; Nikolaos Christou (yellow card) 88'	Stadium: Zosimades Stadium; Referee: Charalabos Margaritis

4 October 2026 2	Thyella Katsikas	1–1	PAS Giannina	Katsikas
16:00	Evagelos Pappas (yellow card) 4'; Nikolaos Ntoukas (yellow card) 12'; Giannis Rizos (yellow card) 47'; Aggelos Lisgaras (yellow card) 56'; Christos Skandalis 82'; Adamantios Lokas (yellow card) 90+2'	Report Report	Belevonis 44' (pen.); Charalabos Panos (yellow card) 57'; Panagiotis Kafenzis (yellow card) 79'; Kitsakis (yellow card) 82'	Stadium: Katsikas Municipal Stadium; Referee: Panagiotis Tsioris

18 October 2026 4	Veria	3–2	PAS Giannina	Veria
16:00	Florentin Bouoli 37' (pen.), 58'; Koukolis (yellow card) 39'; Dimitrios Geronikolos (yellow card) 47'; Christos Alexiadis (yellow card) 74'; Dimitrios Geronikolos 79'	Report Report	Panagiotis Ballas 30', 45'; Siatravanis (yellow card) 31'; Konstantinos Zdravos (yellow card) 31'; Giakos (yellow card) 36'; Ilias Lazaridis (yellow card) 40'; Konstantinos Ntekoumes (yellow card) 45+1'; Panagiotis Kafenzis (red card) 45+1'; Panagiotis Ballas (yellow card) 45+1' (yellow-red card) 45+5'	Stadium: Veria Stadium; Referee: Giorgos Aslanidis

25 October 2026 5	PAS Giannina	2–1	Megas Alexandros Florina	Ioannina
15:00	Alexandros Ferentinos (yellow card) 40'; Charalabos Panos 67'; Nikos Tzovaras 76'	Report Report	Christos Georgiadis 5'; Ilias Giagoulidis (yellow card) 14' (yellow-red card) 62'; Christos Georgiadis (yellow card) 68'	Stadium: Zosimades Stadium; Referee: Marios Sintoris

31 October 2026 6	PAS Giannina	4–0	A.S. Vatolakkos	Ioannina
15:00	Charalabos Panos (yellow card) 14'; Nikos Tzovaras 24', 42', 45+1'; Alexandros Ferentinos 90'	Report Report	Lefteris Gavridis (yellow card) 5'; Lefteris Chrisis (yellow card) 9'; Vasilis Chotzias (yellow card) 87'	Stadium: Zosimades Stadium; Referee: Georgios Fitsas

8 November 2026 7	Naoussa	0–1	PAS Giannina	Naousa
15:00	Nikos Zachos (yellow card) 22'; Dimitrios Aslabaloglou (yellow card) 42'; Alexandros Chaidos (yellow card) 90+6'	Report Report	Belevonis (yellow card) 20'; Panagiotis Ballas 51'; Konstantinos Zdravos (yellow card) 73'; Panagiotis Kafenzis (yellow card) 90'	Stadium: Naousa Municipal Stadium; Referee: Fotios Tzikas

15 November 2026 8	PAS Giannina	2–0	Eordaikos	Ioannina
15:00	Nikos Tzovaras 9'; Thodoros Papas 14' (o.g.); Konstantinos Katerinis (yellow card) 83'; Belevonis (yellow card) 86'; Nikolaos Koliofoukas (yellow card) 90'	Report Report	Dimitrios Papadopoulos (yellow card) 41'; Thanasis Charalabidis (yellow card) 55'; Ilias Siskos (yellow card) 82'	Stadium: Zosimades Stadium; Referee: Charalabos Margaritis

=== Greek Amateur Cup ===
==== Matches ====
10 September 2026 First Round-4th group	PAS Giannina	2-0	Aris Filiates	Kranoula
16:30	Orestis Sintos (yellow card) 30'; Kitsakis 43'; Nikos Tzovaras 47' (pen.); Thomas Potsis (yellow card) 74'	Report Report	Antonis Roubis (yellow card) 36'; Thrasivoulos Efstathopoulos (yellow card) 46'	Stadium: Kranoula Stadium; Referee: Panagiotis Tsioris

18 November 2026 Third Round-4th group	PAS Preveza	0-0 (3–1 p)	PAS Giannina	Preveza
14:30	Stefanos Kostas (yellow card) 39'; Thodoros Karmokolias (yellow card) 47'	Report Report	Fotios Gogas (yellow card) 59'	Stadium: Athanasia Tsoumeleka Municipal Stadium; Referee: Stefanos Chrisikopoulos
	Penalties
	Marios Karampetsos (penalty scored); Mario Tsala (penalty missed); Panagiotis Orfanos (penalty scored); Toska (penalty scored)		(penalty scored) Giakos; (penalty missed) Belevonis; (penalty missed) Konstantinos Zdravos; (penalty missed) Alexandros Ferentinos
