= List of PAS Giannina F.C. seasons =

PAS Giannina Football Club (Greek: ΠΑΕ ΠΑΣ Γιάννινα 1966), or with its full name Panepirotikos Athlitikos Syllogos Giannina (Greek: Πανηπειρωτικός Αθλητικός Σύλλογος Γιάννινα, Panepirotic Athletic Club Giannina) is a Greek professional football club based in the city of Ioannina, the capital of Epirus region.

PAS Giannina was formed in 1966 as a result of the union of the two local teams – AO Ioanninon (union of Atromitos Ioanninon and Olympiacos Ioanninon in 1962) and PAS Averof. As emblem of the new team was chosen the bull, as appeared on the ancient coin of the Epirote League. The club have competed several times in the Super League. The club's best finish in the competition is 5th place on three occasions (1975-76, 1977-78, 2012-13). They have reached the semi-finals of the Greek Cup overall three times (2006-07, 2009-10, 2020-21). They have competed once in UEFA competitions. Also, they participated in the Balkans Cup on two occasions.

== Key ==
=== Key to league competitions ===
- A/SL:Greece's top football league.
- B/FL:The second tier of Greek football until 2019.
- SL2:The second tier of Greek football since 2019.
- CN:The third tier of Greek football.

== Seasons ==
Season	Division	Pld	W	D	L	GF	GA	Pts	Pos	Greek Cup	Competition	Result	Player(s)	Goals
Season	League									Greek Cup	Other / Europe		Top goalscorer(s)	
1966–67	B1	34	18	5	11	60	43	75	6th	R32				
1967–68	BS	30	10	9	11	38	42	59	10th	QR				
1968–69	BS	34	15	6	13	40	38	70	5th	QR				
1969–70	B1	34	14	9	11	38	27	71	7th	QR				
1970–71	B1	34	9	13	12	34	42	65	13th	QR6				
1971–72	B1	38	13	10	15	38	36	74	13th	R16				
1972–73	B1	38	23	9	6	81	27	93	2nd	R16				
1973–74	B1	38	25	8	5	76	20	58	1st	QF				
1974–75	A	34	13	6	15	38	43	32	9th	R32				
1975–76	A	30	15	6	9	40	33	36	5th	SR				
1976–77	A	34	10	9	15	47	54	29	11th	R16				
1977–78	A	34	14	10	10	45	39	38	5th	QF				
1978–79	A	34	9	10	15	38	51	28	14th	FR				
1979–80	A	34	14	9	11	50	44	37	6th	R16	Balkans Cup	GS		
1980–81	A	34	11	9	14	43	47	31	11th	FR				
1981–82	A	34	9	10	15	32	48	28	14th	FR				
1982–83	A	34	10	13	11	35	34	33	9th	FR				
1983–84	A	30	8	7	15	25	36	23	15th	R32				
1984–85	B	38	20	10	8	64	28	50	1st	R32				
1985–86	A	30	8	8	14	30	42	24	13th	FR				
1986–87	A	30	5	7	18	14	38	11	16th	FR				
1987–88	B	34	15	7	12	33	34	32	12th	R16				
1988–89	B	34	15	8	11	42	39	38	4th	QF				
1989–90	B	34	13	14	7	47	29	40	3rd	GS				
1990–91	A	34	8	9	17	20	54	25	18th	GS				
1991–92	B	34	11	9	14	36	43	31	14th	GS				
1992–93	B	34	13	8	13	34	39	47	6th	GS				
1993–94	B	34	16	8	10	66	43	56	5th	QF	Balkans Cup	RU		
1994–95	B	34	13	9	12	34	45	48	8th	GS				
1995–96	B	34	12	10	12	41	39	46	12th	GS				
1996–97	B	34	7	7	20	32	55	28	16th	FR				
1997–98	CN	28	14	11	3	42	21	53	1st	FR				
1998–99	B	34	19	8	7	51	22	65	4th	FR				
1999–00	B	34	20	6	8	52	23	66	3rd	AR				
2000–01	A	30	8	9	13	40	53	33	13th	R16				
2001–02	B	26	15	6	5	38	24	50	1st	GS				
2002–03	A	30	6	7	17	25	44	-65	16th	R16				
2003–04	B	30	8	7	15	26	31	31	14th	FR				
2004–05	CN	32	20	5	7	56	29	65	2nd	FR				
2005–06	CN	30	20	8	2	57	13	68	2nd	R32				
2006–07	B	34	14	11	9	49	34	53	5th	SF				
2007–08	B	34	16	9	9	54	38	57	4th	SR				
2008–09	B	34	20	9	5	70	36	69	2nd	SR-AR				
2009–10	SL	30	7	7	16	27	46	28	15th	SF			Giorgos Saitiotis	6
2010–11	FL	34	22	8	4	55	17	74	2nd	R16			Ibrahima Bakayoko	21
2011–12	SL	30	10	8	12	30	35	38	8th	R16			Ibrahima Bakayoko Leandro Becerra	7
2012–13	SL	30	12	8	10	28	24	44	5th	QF			Brana Ilić	11
2012–13	playoffs	6	2	1	3	6	8	7	5th	QF			Brana Ilić	11
2013–14	SL	34	12	5	17	34	43	41	11th	R32			Tomas De Vincenti Brana Ilić	5
2014–15	SL	34	13	14	7	47	33	53	6th	R16			Michalis Manias	9
2015–16	SL	30	12	6	12	36	40	42	6th	R16			Michalis Manias	10
2016–17	SL	30	8	12	10	30	37	36	9th	R16	Europa League	SQR	Pedro Conde	14
2017–18	SL	30	7	13	10	31	34	34	9th	QF			Pedro Conde	20
2018–19	SL	30	7	6	17	19	38	27	14th	R16			Sandi Križman	6
2019–20	SL2	20	15	4	1	44	11	49	1st	R16			Georgios Pamlidis	12
2020–21	SL	33	9	8	16	27	36	35	9th	SF			Georgios Pamlidis	8
2021–22	SL	36	12	10	14	34	42	46	6th	R5			Juan José Perea	10
2022–23	SL	33	7	13	13	33	50	34	9th	R5			Rodrigo Erramuspe	9
2023–24	SL	33	4	11	18	33	62	23	14th	R5			Pedro Conde	9
2024–25	SL2	18	8	7	3	23	21	31	3rd	FR			Moritz Heinrich	14
2024–25	playoffs	8	2	3	3	12	17	25	3rd	FR			Moritz Heinrich	14
2025–26	SL2	18	2	4	12	10	24	10	9th	QR			Emiljano Bullari	7
2025–26	playouts	10	3	2	5	14	17	16	4th	QR			Emiljano Bullari	7

Point system: 1959–60 to 1972–73: 3–2–1. 1973–74 to 1991–92: 2–1–0. 1992–93 onwards: 3–1–0.
