= Vasilios Pavlidis =

Vasilios Pavlidis may refer to:

- Vasilios Pavlidis (wrestler) (1897-unknown), Greek wrestler
- Vasilios Pavlidis (footballer) (born 2002), Greek footballer
