= Spyros Chatzikyriakos =

Greek footballer (born 2004)

Personal information
- Full name: Spyridon Chatzikyriakos
- Date of birth: 12 October 2004 (age 22)
- Place of birth: Athens, Greece
- Position: Centre-back

Team information
- Current team: Kampaniakos
- Number: 4

Youth career
- AEK Athens
- Kallithea
- Fostiras

Senior career*
Years	Team	Apps	(Gls)
2021–2022	Fostiras		
2022–2024	AEK Athens B	12	(0)
2024	Fostiras		
2024–2025	Ethnikos Piraeus		
2025–	Kampaniakos	17	(0)

International career^{‡}
2022–2023	Greece U19	3	(0)
- * Club domestic league appearances and goals as of 20 April 2026 ‡ National team caps and goals as of 28 February 2023

Spyros Chatzikyriakos (Greek: Σπύρος Χατζηκυριάκος; born 12 October 2004) is a Greek professional footballer who plays as a centre-back for Super League 2 club Kampaniakos.
