= Dimitrios Tsopouroglou =

Greek footballer

Personal information
- Date of birth: 21 June 2002 (age 24)
- Place of birth: Thessaloniki, Greece
- Height: 1.75 m (5 ft 9 in)
- Positions: Central midfielder; full-back

Team information
- Current team: PAOK B
- Number: 33

Youth career
- 2009–2021: PAOK

Senior career*
Years	Team	Apps	(Gls)
2021–	PAOK B	115	(8)

International career
2023	Greece U21	2	(0)
- * Club domestic league appearances and goals as of 20 April 2026

Dimitrios Tsopouroglou (Greek: Δημήτριος Τσοπούρογλου; born 21 June 2002) is a Greek professional footballer who plays as a midfielder for Super League 2 club PAOK B.
