= Pedro Conde (footballer) =

Spanish footballer

Personal information
- Full name: Pedro Pérez Conde
- Date of birth: 26 July 1988 (age 38)
- Place of birth: Villafranca, Spain
- Height: 1.82 m (6 ft 0 in)
- Position: Striker

Youth career
- Córdoba

Senior career*
Years	Team	Apps	(Gls)
2007–2009	Córdoba B	74	(31)
2008	Córdoba	0	(0)
2009–2010	Atlético Madrid C	34	(16)
2010–2011	Jaén	23	(2)
2011–2012	Pozoblanco	36	(20)
2012–2013	Granada B	35	(22)
2013–2014	Alcoyano	32	(4)
2014–2015	Melilla	34	(3)
2015–2016	Mérida	36	(17)
2016–2018	PAS Giannina	51	(27)
2018–2020	Baniyas	37	(25)
2020–2021	Shabab Al Ahli	5	(0)
2021	→ Al Dhafra (loan)	13	(5)
2021–2024	PAS Giannina	37	(11)
2024–2025	Volos	30	(4)
2025–2026	PAS Giannina	9	(0)
2026	AER Afantou	0	(0)
- * Club domestic league appearances and goals as of 21 December 2025

Pedro Conde (born 26 July 1988) is a Spanish professional footballer who plays as a striker.

== Club career ==
=== Córdoba ===
Born in Villafranca de Córdoba, Andalusia, Conde graduated from Córdoba CF's youth academy. He made his senior debut with the reserves in the 2006–07 season, in Tercera División.

Conde played his first match as a professional on 3 September 2008, coming on as a substitute for Pepe Díaz in the 82nd minute of a 2–1 away loss against CD Tenerife in the second round of the Copa del Rey. He would spend most of his spell with the B side, always in the lower leagues.

=== Journeyman ===
In summer 2009, Conde moved to Atlético Madrid, being assigned to the C team also in the fourth division. He subsequently resumed his career at that level but also in Segunda División B, representing Real Jaén, CD Pozoblanco, Granada CF B, CD Alcoyano, UD Melilla and Mérida AD; he helped the latter team to finish eighth in their first-ever season in the third tier, ranking group top scorer and third overall.

=== PAS Giannina ===
On 7 July 2016, aged 28, Conde moved abroad for the first time in his career and signed a three-year contract with PAS Giannina in the Super League Greece. He scored in only his second appearance in the UEFA Europa League, but in a 1–2 home defeat to AZ Alkmaar in the third qualifying round (1–3 on aggregate).

On 23 October 2016, Conde netted a hat-trick to help the hosts overcome Athlitiki Enosi Larissa F.C. 4–0 at the Zosimades Stadium. He finished the campaign with 14 goals in all competitions, his 13 in the league ranking third.

Conde netted eight times overall early into 2017–18, which led to interest from Panathinaikos FC. On 10 January 2018, his brace in the second leg of the round of 16 of the Greek Football Cup helped the hosts defeat Levadiakos F.C. 4–0 and go through after a 1–0 loss.

=== UAE ===
On 28 August 2018, Conde agreed to a two-year deal at Baniyas Club for a fee of around €800,000. On 15 January 2020, he signed with Shabab Al Ahli Club also in the UAE Pro League.

=== Return to PAS ===
Conde returned to PAS Giannina on 9 August 2021, aged 33. He scored in his debut on 12 September, through a free kick in a 1–0 away victory over PAOK FC.

On 18 September 2021, Conde suffered a cruciate ligament rupture in a game against Panathinaikos FC, being sidelined for the rest of the season.

== Career statistics ==
As of match played 7 April 2026

Club	Season	League			National cup (Note: Includes Copa del Rey, Greek Football Cup, UAE President's Cup)		Continental		Total	
Club	Season	Division	Apps	Goals	Apps	Goals	Apps	Goals	Apps	Goals
Córdoba B	2006–07	Tercera División	3	1	—		—		3	1
Córdoba B	2007–08	Tercera División	35	14	—		—		35	14
Córdoba B	2008–09	Tercera División	36	16	—		—		36	16
Córdoba B	Total		74	31	0	0	0	0	74	31
Jaén	2010–11	Segunda División B	24	2	—		—		24	2
Pozoblanco	2011–12	Tercera División	36	20	—		—		36	20
Granada B	2012–13	Tercera División	41	23	—		—		41	23
Alcoyano	2013–14	Segunda División B	32	4	—		—		32	4
Melilla	2014–15	Segunda División B	34	3	—		—		34	3
Mérida	2015–16	Segunda División B	36	17	1	0	—		37	17
PAS Giannina	2016–17	Super League Greece	25	13	3	0	2 (Note: Appearances in UEFA Europa League)	1	30	14
PAS Giannina	2017–18	Super League Greece	26	14	5	6	—		31	20
PAS Giannina	Total		51	27	8	6	2	1	61	34
Baniyas	2018–19	UAE Pro League	25	18	6	5	—		31	23
Baniyas	2019–20	UAE Pro League	12	7	6	7	—		18	14
Baniyas	Total		37	25	12	12	0	0	49	37
Shabab Al Ahli	2019–20	UAE Pro League	5	0	1	0	6 (Note: Appearances in AFC Champions League)	2	12	2
Al Dhafra	2020–21	UAE Pro League	13	5	0	0	0	0	13	5
PAS Giannina	2021–22	Super League Greece	5	1	0	0	0	0	5	1
PAS Giannina	2022–23	Super League Greece	5	1	0	0	0	0	5	1
PAS Giannina	2023–24	Super League Greece	27	9	1	0	0	0	28	9
PAS Giannina	Total		37	11	1	0	0	0	38	11
Volos	2024–25	Super League Greece	30	4	1	0	0	0	31	4
PAS Giannina	2025–26	Super League Greece 2	9	0	0	0	0	0	9	0
Career total			459	172	24	18	8	3	491	193
