= Candas Fiogbé =

Benin footballer

Personal information
- Full name: Candas Bah Yovo Fiogbé
- Date of birth: 18 January 2005 (age 21)
- Place of birth: Dékanmey, Benin
- Height: 1.82 m (6 ft 0 in)
- Position: Forward

Team information
- Current team: Athens Kallithea
- Number: 7

Youth career
- 2012–: Atalanta

Senior career*
Years	Team	Apps	(Gls)
2024–2026	Atalanta U23	4	(0)
2026	→ PAS Giannina (loan)	7	(3)
2026–	Athens Kallithea	1	(0)

International career^{‡}
2025–	Benin	3	(0)
- * Club domestic league appearances and goals as of 12 September 2026 ‡ National team caps and goals as of 21:30, 9 September 2025 (UTC)

Candas Bah Yovo Fiogbé (born 18 January 2005) is a Beninese footballer who plays for Greek Super League 2 club Athens Kallithea and the Benin national team.

== Club career ==
In 2011, Fiogbé was spotted by the Codjia Nedville Football Scuola (CNFS) in Ouidah. The following year, the academy organized trials in Italy with Inter Milan, Juventus, Hellas Verona and Atalanta. Following the trial, the twelve-year-old Fiogbé joined the academy of Atalanta. He remained with the club until 2023 when he signed his first professional contract at the age of eighteen after becoming a regular starter for the club's reserve side. Fiogbé scored six goals and tallied two assists in the first five matches of the 2024–25 UEFA Youth League including one against Arsenal and a brace against Shakhtar Donetsk.

In late 2024, Fiogbé attracted interest from Lille OSC and Toulouse FC of France's Ligue 1 and SV Darmstadt 98 of Germany's 2. Bundesliga.

== International career ==
Fiogbé was eligible to represent Benin, the Ivory Coast, and Italy at the international level. In early 2025 it was reported that Benin, his country of birth, was in the lead for the player's allegiance. In March 2025 he accepted the call-up from Benin's head coach Gernot Rohr for 2026 FIFA World Cup qualification matches against Zimbabwe and South Africa. About representing the country, Fiogbé said, "I've always been focused on Benin, I was just waiting for the right moment to come. Now I'm ready."

Fiogbé made his senior international debut as a late substitute on 25 March in Benin's match against South Africa. The player had previously not appeared in a senior club match prior to his international debut.

=== International career statistics ===
As of match played 25 March 2025

National team	Year	Apps	Goals
Benin
Benin	2025	1	0
Total		1	0

== Personal life ==
Fiogbé was born in Dékanmey. His Fiogbé family is from Abomey while the Dossou-Yovo are from Ouidah.
