= Theodoros Tsirigotis =

Greek football player

Personal information
- Date of birth: 23 March 2000 (age 26)
- Place of birth: Marousi, Greece
- Height: 1.83 m (6 ft 0 in)
- Position: Striker

Team information
- Current team: Athens Kallithea
- Number: 13

Youth career
- 2014–2018: Olympiacos

Senior career*
Years	Team	Apps	(Gls)
2018–2019	Diagoras Vrachnaiika	23	(8)
2019–2021	Episkopi	36	(21)
2021–2024	Levadiakos	27	(8)
2021–2022	→ Panathinaikos B (loan)	29	(5)
2023	→ AEL (loan)	12	(7)
2024–2025	Iraklis	25	(21)
2025–2026	Górnik Zabrze	6	(0)
2025–2026	→ Polonia Bytom (loan)	1	(0)
2026	Górnik Zabrze II	2	(0)
2026	→ TPS (loan)	8	(3)
2026–	Athens Kallithea	1	(0)

International career
2016	Greece U17	3	(1)
2017	Greece U19	2	(0)
- * Club domestic league appearances and goals as of 21:00, 20 September 2026 (UTC)

Theodoros Tsirigotis (Greek: Θεόδωρος Τσιριγώτης; born 23 March 2000) is a Greek professional footballer who plays as a striker for Super League 2 club Athens Kallithea.

== Career ==
On 1 August 2024, Tsirigotis joined Iraklis on a free transfer.

On 5 May 2025, it was announced that Tsirigotis would move to Polish club Górnik Zabrze in the following summer on a three-year contract. On 8 September, he joined second division club Polonia Bytom on loan for the rest of the season. He made two appearances for Polonia before the loan was terminated on 28 February 2026.

On 24 March 2026, Tsirigotis joined newly promoted Finnish Veikkausliiga club Turun Palloseura on a loan deal until August 2026.

On 14 September 2026, Tsirigotis signed for Athens Kallithea on a free transfer.
