= Alexandros Tereziou =

Greek footballer (born 2000)

Personal information
- Date of birth: 1 March 2000 (age 26)
- Place of birth: Nafplio, Greece
- Height: 1.81 m (5 ft 11 in)
- Position: Left-back

Team information
- Current team: Asteras Tripolis
- Number: 17

Youth career
- 2009–2018: Asteras Tripolis

Senior career*
Years	Team	Apps	(Gls)
2018–2020	Asteras Tripolis	0	(0)
2019–2020	→ Karaiskakis (loan)	4	(0)
2020–2021	Skënderbeu	14	(1)
2021–2022	Volos	13	(1)
2022–2023	Panathinaikos B	17	(0)
2023–2025	Lamia	10	(0)
2025–2026	Asteras Tripolis B	19	(2)
2026–	Asteras Tripolis	6	(0)

International career^{‡}
2021	Greece U21	2	(0)
- * Club domestic league appearances and goals as of 20 September 2026 ‡ National team caps and goals as of 16 November 2021

Alexandros Tereziou (Greek: Αλέξανδρος Τερεζίου, Albanian: Aleksandër Tereziu; born 1 March 2000) is a Greek professional footballer who plays as a left-back for Super League club Asteras Tripolis.

== Career ==
=== Skënderbeu Korçë ===
On 22 October 2020, Tereziou signed a four-year contract with Kategoria Superiore club Skënderbeu Korçë.
