= Achilleas Salamouras =

Greek footballer

Personal information
- Date of birth: 15 January 2000 (age 26)
- Place of birth: Volos, Greece
- Height: 1.75 m (5 ft 9 in)
- Position: Midfielder

Team information
- Current team: Niki Volos
- Number: 21

Youth career
- 2015–2021: PAOK

Senior career*
Years	Team	Apps	(Gls)
2015–2019	PAOK	0	(0)
2019–2020	Volos (loan)	0	(0)
2020–2021	→ Niki Volos (loan)	22	(0)
2021–2023	PAOK B	31	(0)
2023–2024	Anagennisi Karditsa	26	(0)
2024–	Niki Volos	22	(0)
- * Club domestic league appearances and goals as of 20 April 2026

Achilleas Salamouras (Greek: Αχιλλέας Σαλαμούρας; born 15 January 2000) is a Greek professional footballer who plays as a midfielder for Super League 2 club Niki Volos.
