= Stathis Belevonis =

Greek footballer (born 1998)

Personal information
- Full name: Efstathios Belevonis
- Date of birth: 6 February 1998 (age 28)
- Place of birth: Agrinio, Greece
- Height: 1.73 m (5 ft 8 in)
- Position: Midfielder

Team information
- Current team: PAS Giannina

Youth career
- Panetolikos

Senior career*
Years	Team	Apps	(Gls)
2018–2020	Panetolikos	3	(0)
2019–2020	→ Tilikratis (loan)		
2020	→ Messolonghi (loan)		
2020–2021	Messolonghi		
2021	Doxa Drama	18	(0)
2021–2022	Panetolikos	2	(0)
2022	→ Kavala (loan)	20	(0)
2022–2023	Apollon Pontus	23	(3)
2023–2025	Tilikratis	45	(2)
2025–2026	Ilisiakos	25	(2)
2026–	PAS Giannina	0	(0)
- * Club domestic league appearances and goals as of 19:20, 31 July 2026 (UTC)

Efstathios "Stathis" Belevonis (Greek: Ευστάθιος "Στάθης" Μπελεβώνης; born 6 February 1998) is a Greek professional footballer who plays as a midfielder for PAS Giannina.

== Career ==
On 31 January 2020, Belevonis was sent on loan to Messolonghi. The deal was made permanent in September of the same year. Half a season later, in January 2021, Belevonis was sold to Doxa Drama. He joined Panetolikos in the summer, who loaned him out to Kavala for the remainder of the season in January 2022.

He joined PAS Giannina in July 2026.
