= Villafranca de Córdoba =

- Municipality
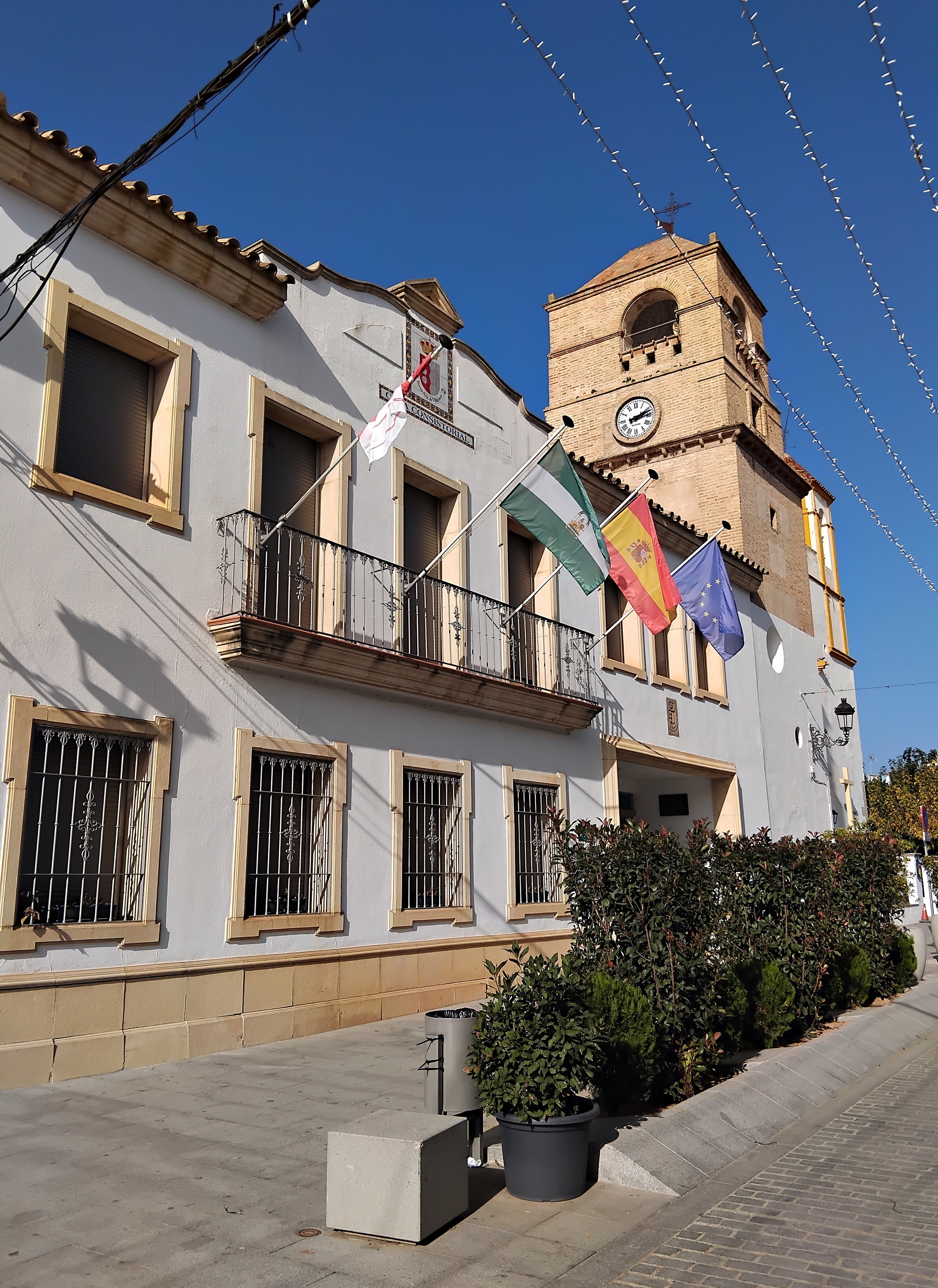
- Town hall

- Flag Seal

- Location in Spain.
- Coordinates: 37°57′N 4°32′W
- Country: Spain
- Autonomous community: Andalusia
- Province: Córdoba
- Comarca: Valle del Guadiato

Government
  - Mayor: Francisco Javier López Casado

Area
  - Total: 58 km^{2} (22 sq mi)
- Elevation: 146 m (479 ft)

Population (2025-01-01)
  - Total: 4,895
  - Density: 84/km^{2} (220/sq mi)
- Demonym: Villafranqueños
- Time zone: UTC+1 (CET)
  - Summer (DST): UTC+2 (CEST)

Villafranca de Córdoba is a municipality located in the province of Córdoba, Spain.

== See also ==
- List of municipalities in Córdoba
