= Marko Brkljača =

Croatian footballer (born 2004)

Personal information
- Date of birth: 15 July 2004 (age 22)
- Place of birth: Zadar, Croatia
- Height: 1.76 m (5 ft 9 in)
- Position: Midfielder

Team information
- Current team: Victoria Rosport
- Number: 20

Youth career
- –2014: Velebit
- 2014–2021: Hajduk Split

Senior career*
Years	Team	Apps	(Gls)
2021–2022	Hajduk Split	2	(0)
2022–2025	Dinamo Zagreb	0	(0)
2023	→ Dubrava (loan)	11	(0)
2023–2024	→ Aluminij (loan)	24	(0)
2025–2026	PAS Giannina	15	(0)
2026–	Victoria Rosport	15	(2)

International career
2018–2019	Croatia U15	5	(0)
2019–2020	Croatia U17	4	(0)
2021	Croatia U18	2	(0)
2021–2022	Croatia U19	13	(3)
- * Club domestic league appearances and goals as of 13 June 2026

Marko Brkljača (born 15 July 2004) is a Croatian professional footballer who plays as a midfielder for Luxembourg National Division club Victoria Rosport.

He was included in The Guardian's "Next Generation" list for 2021.

== Career statistics ==
=== Club ===
As of 30 June 2022.

Appearances and goals by club, season and competition
Club	Season	League			National cup		Continental		Other		Total	
Club	Season	Division	Apps	Goals	Apps	Goals	Apps	Goals	Apps	Goals	Apps	Goals
Hajduk Split	2021–22	1. HNL	2	0	1	0	0	0	0	0	3	0
Career total			2	0	1	0	0	0	0	0	3	0
