= Nikolaos Dosis =

Swedish-Greek footballer

Personal information
- Date of birth: 25 January 2001 (age 25)
- Place of birth: Solna, Sweden
- Height: 1.82 m (6 ft 0 in)
- Position: Midfielder

Team information
- Current team: Anagennisi Karditsa
- Number: 25

Youth career
- –2019: AIK
- 2020: FC Djursholm

Senior career*
Years	Team	Apps	(Gls)
2020–2022	Östersund	42	(1)
2022–2023	Olympiakos Nicosia	18	(1)
2024–2025	Volos	3	(0)
2025–2026	PAS Giannina	10	(0)
2026	Mariehamn	13	(0)
2026–	Anagennisi Karditsa	0	(0)

International career^{‡}
2017	Greece U16	4	(0)
2017	Sweden U16	3	(0)
- * Club domestic league appearances and goals as of 23 July 2026 ‡ National team caps and goals as of 14 January 2021

Nikolaos Dosis (born 25 January 2001) is a professional footballer who plays for Super League Greece 2 club Anagennisi Karditsa. He has represented both Greece and Sweden at youth international level.

== Career statistics ==
=== Club ===
As of 14 January 2021.

Club	Season	League			Cup		Continental		Other		Total	
Club	Season	Division	Apps	Goals	Apps	Goals	Apps	Goals	Apps	Goals	Apps	Goals
Östersund	2020	Allsvenskan	8	0	1 (Note: Appearances in the Svenska Cupen)	0	–		0	0	9	0
Östersund	2021	Allsvenskan	21	0	1	0	–		0	0	22	0
Career total			29	0	2	0	0	0	0	0	31	0
