= Rayvien Rosario =

Footballer (born 2004)

Personal information
- Date of birth: 11 April 2004 (age 22)
- Place of birth: Willemstad, Curaçao
- Height: 1.81 m (5 ft 11 in)
- Position: Attacking midfielder

Team information
- Current team: Zimbru Chișinău

Youth career
- VV HDV
- VV WIK
- 2016–2020: Voetbal Club Sparta
- 2020–2022: Sparta Rotterdam

Senior career*
Years	Team	Apps	(Gls)
2022–2024	Sparta Rotterdam II	48	(6)
2023–2024	Sparta Rotterdam	7	(0)
2024–2025	Excelsior	9	(0)
2025	PAS Giannina	6	(0)
2026–	Zimbru Chișinău	2	(0)

International career^{‡}
2024–	Curaçao	2	(0)
- * Club domestic league appearances and goals as of 14:12, 19 June 2026 (UTC) ‡ National team caps and goals as of 14:21, 15 June 2026 (UTC)

Rayvien Rosario (born 11 April 2004) is a Curaçaoan professional footballer who plays as an attacking midfielder for Moldovan Liga club Zimbru Chișinău and the Curaçao national team.

== Club career ==
Rosario is a youth product of the Dutch clubs VV HDV, VV WIK, and Voetbal Club Sparta, before moving to the youth academy of Sparta Rotterdam in 2020. He made his senior and professional debut with Sparta Rotterdam as a substitute in a 4–0 loss to Ajax on 29 February 2023. On 11 April 2023, he signed his first professional contract with Sparta until 2026.

On 17 August 2024, Rosario moved to Excelsior on a three-year contract.

== International career ==
Born in Curaçao and raised in mainland Netherlands, Rosario is of Venezuelan descent. He was called up to the Curaçao national team for a set of 2026 FIFA World Cup qualification matches in June 2024.

He made his debut on 5 June 2024 against Barbados at the Ergilio Hato Stadium. He substituted Juninho Bacuna in the 79th minute and recorded an assist as Curaçao won 4–1.
