= Themis Patrinos =

Greek footballer

Personal information
- Full name: Themistoklis Athanasios Patrinos
- Date of birth: 18 January 2001 (age 25)
- Place of birth: Athens, Greece
- Height: 1.82 m (6 ft 0 in)
- Position: Forward

Team information
- Current team: Apollon Kalamarias
- Number: 9

Youth career
- 2014–2019: AEK Athens
- 2019–2020: FC 08 Homburg
- 2020: Ergotelis

Senior career*
Years	Team	Apps	(Gls)
2020–2022	Ergotelis	48	(3)
2022–2023	Egaleo	3	(0)
2023	Almopos Aridea	11	(1)
2023–2024	Panachaiki	23	(7)
2025–2026	PAS Giannina	20	(0)
2026–	Apollon Kalamarias	0	(0)

International career^{‡}
2018	Greece U17	2	(0)
- * Club domestic league appearances and goals as of 26 April 2026 ‡ National team caps and goals as of 8 February 2018

Themistoklis Athanasios "Themis" Patrinos (Greek: Θεμιστοκλής Αθανάσιος "Θέμης" Πατρινός; born 18 January 2001) is a Greek professional footballer who plays as a forward for Apollon Kalamarias.

== Career statistics ==
=== Club ===
As of 19 May 2021

Club	Season	League			Cup		Europe		Total	
Club	Season	Division	Apps	Goals	Apps	Goals	Apps	Goals	Apps	Goals
Ergotelis	2020–21	Super League Greece 2	20	3	–		–		20	3
Ergotelis	Total		20	3	0	0	0	0	20	3
