= Athens Kallithea F.C. =

Athens Kallithea
- Full name: Athens Kallithea Football Club
- Nicknames: Πεντάστερη (Five Stars); Ίνγκλαντ (England)
- Founded: 18 August 1966; 60 years ago
- Ground: Grigoris Lamprakis Stadium
- Capacity: 6,300
- Owner: Alex Dunev
- Chairman: Ted Philipakos
- Head coach: Vangelis Moras
- League: Super League Greece 2
- 2025–26: Super League Greece 2 (South Group), 6th
- Website: akfc66.gr
Home colours	Away colours

Athens Kallithea Football Club is a Greek professional football club based in Kallithea, a city and a suburb in Athens. The club currently competes in the Super League 2, the second tier of the Greek football league system.

The club has finished as high as ninth in the Greek top flight (2004–05) and has reached as far as the quarterfinal stage of the Greek Cup on five occasions (1969–70, 1978–79, 1986–87, 2001–02, 2009–10).

== History ==
=== Founding and early history ===
The club was founded on 18 August 1966 from the merger of five local clubs: Esperos, Iraklis, AE Kallitheas, Kallithaikos, and Pyrsos.

In 1970, Kallithea's Grigoris Lambrakis Stadium, named after the Greek liberal politician and peace activist Grigoris Lambrakis, was opened to the public.

=== Promotion to the second division ===
Under co-managers Kostas Nestoridis and Takis Papoulidis, Kallithea clinched their first promotion to Greece's second division with a 1-0 playoff win over AO Koropi on a goal by Giannis Maxouris in extra time on 21 June 1969.

Kallithea’s victory over Koropi had political significance in dictatorial Greece. During the rule of the Greek junta, the Secretary General of Sport Costas Aslanidis had planned a reform of the football map that would eliminate clubs opposed to the regime — including Kallithea. When Kallithea defeated regime-favored Koropi, there were mass celebrations in the streets, with BBC Radio calling it “the first defeat of the junta.”

=== Promotion to the first division ===
On 28 April 2002, Kallithea clinched their first promotion to Greece's top division with a 0-1 win over Chalkidona FC at Neapoli Stadium on a goal by Theofanis Gekas.

The club's first win in the competition was a 3–2 upset of PAOK at Toumba Stadium, thanks to two goals from Gekas, on 14 September 2002.

After four seasons in the top flight, Kallithea were relegated in the 2005-06 season.

=== Recent history (2021 to present) ===
In August 2021, New York-born Greek-American Ted Philipakos, a former Chief Executive Officer and Chief Brand Officer at Venezia FC, led the takeover of Kallithea FC with his brother and former professional footballer Peter Philipakos and investor Andrew Barroway.

In the 2021-22 season, Kallithea finished second in Super League 2, seven points back of league winners Levadiakos for promotion to Super League 1, which was the club's most successful season since it last appeared in the top division in 2005–06.

In September 2022, the club rebranded as Athens Kallithea FC. The presentation of the club's rebranding was met with widespread acclaim in Greece and abroad, with London-based Versus calling it "one of the cleanest football rebrands ever."

In the 2022-23 season, AKFC missed out on promotion to Super League 1 by one point, finishing second in Super League 2 for the second consecutive season.

After two consecutive second-place finishes, AKFC were crowned 2023-24 Super League 2 South Group champions and earned promotion to the Super League, returning to the top flight for the first time in 18 years. The promotion was clinched in a 1-1 draw with second-place Chania at Grigoris Lamprakis Stadium in the penultimate round of the season on 9 May 2024, after Argentinian defender Nicolás Marotta headed in from Javier Matilla's free-kick to level the match. Giannis Loukinas was the team's leading scorer in the promotion-winning campaign, scoring nine goals during the regular season and nine goals in eight promotion playoff matches.

== Stadium ==
=== Historical ===
Athens Kallithea historically play at Grigoris Lamprakis Stadium in the district of Kallithea, located 2 km south of the Acropolis and 1 km west of Syggrou Avenue.

Built in 1970, Grigoris Lamprakis Stadium is a public stadium, which has been named after the Greek liberal politician and peace activist Grigoris Lamprakis.

The stadium is commonly referred to by its nickname “El Paso,” a reference to Sergio Leone’s 1965 Spaghetti Western film For a Few Dollars More (which had the title Duel in El Paso in Greece) starring Clint Eastwood, the second installment of the Dollars Trilogy, because of the tall rock that overlooks the north side of the pitch, considered reminiscent of the film's depiction of El Paso, Texas.

=== Temporary ===
For the 2024–25 Super League season, Athens Kallithea temporarily played at Leoforos Alexandras Stadium, as Grigoris Lamprakis Stadium did not yet meet Super League regulations.

== Crest and colors ==
The first crest of Kallithea consisted of four circles representing the four groups of the merger of 1966, then becoming five circles with the addition of Pyrsos in 1967, which caused an issue with the Hellenic Olympic Committee. As a result, the club introduced a new crest with five stars in a diagonal line. The club's colors were blue and white, which were the colors of the two main groups of the merger, Esperos Kallitheas and Iraklis Kallitheas.

In September 2022, the club rebranded as Athens Kallithea and presented a new visual identity, including a new crest — an "AK" monogram, with five points that reference the five stars of the previous crest. The club's traditional blue and white were maintained as primary colors, with an update to the tone of blue, while gold was introduced as a complementary color. The work was executed in collaboration with German design studio Bureau Borsche, which also handled the rebrandings of Inter Milan and Venezia FC.

== Players ==
=== Current squad ===
As of 25 September 2026

Note: Flags indicate national team as defined under FIFA eligibility rules; some limited exceptions apply. Players may hold more than one non-FIFA nationality.

No.	Pos.	Nation	Player
1	GK	GRE	Angelos Angelopoulos (on loan from AEK Athens)
2	DF	POL	Wiktor Matyjewicz
3	DF	GRE	Diamantis Chouchoumis
4	DF	GRE	Christos Kosidis
5	DF	ROU	Sebastian Mladen
6	MF	GRE	Iraklis Garoufalias
7	FW	BEN	Candas Fiogbé
8	MF	ESP	Kevin Bautista
9	FW	VEN	José Romo
10	FW	PAR	Rodrigo López
11	MF	ARG	Lucas Villafáñez
12	DF	GRE	Antonis Anastasiou
13	FW	GRE	Theodoros Tsirigotis
14	MF	GRE	Giannis Varkas
15	DF	GRE	Michalis Stamatoulas
17	MF	GRE	Vasilios Kontonikos (on loan from AEK Athens)

No.	Pos.	Nation	Player
19	DF	GRE	Giannis Sotirakos
20	MF	GRE	Alexis Golfinos
21	DF	GRE	Konstantinos Panagou
22	DF	GRE	Filimon Frosynis
23	DF	GRE	Konstantinos Armenis
24	DF	GRE	Konstantinos Provydakis
28	MF	GRE	Manolis Faitakis (on loan from OFI)
30	MF	ALB	Orgest Ormenaj
31	GK	GRE	Panormitis Kalliaros
32	MF	GRE	Theofanis Tzandaris
33	FW	GRE	Michalis Manias
36	GK	ALB	Elhan Kastrati
39	MF	GRE	Christos Kourfalidis
60	GK	GRE	Symeon Papadopoulos
74	DF	GRE	Vasilios Prekates

== Coaching staff ==
As of 13 July 2026

Position	Name
Head coach	(Greece) Vangelis Moras
Assistant coach	(Greece) Kosmas Tsilianidis
Goalkeeper coach	(Greece) Chrysostomos Michailidis
Fitness coach	(Greece) Giannis Kotsis
Fitness coach	(Greece) Konstantinos Parousis
Rehab coach	(Greece) Christodoulos Chalaris
Analyst	(Greece) Dimitrios Damakas

== Honours ==
- Second Division
  - Winners (1): 2023–24
  - Runners-up (1): 2002 (promoted)
- Third Division
  - Winners (4): 1969, 1976, 1993, 2010
  - Runners-up (2): 1987 (promoted), 1997 (promoted)
- Fourth Division
  - Winners (1): 2020
