= Vasilios Kitsakis =

Greek footballer

Personal information
- Date of birth: 24 January 2003 (age 23)
- Place of birth: Ioannina, Greece
- Height: 1.75 m (5 ft 9 in)
- Position: Right-back

Team information
- Current team: PAS Giannina
- Number: 87

Youth career
- 2016–2022: PAOK

Senior career*
Years	Team	Apps	(Gls)
2022–2026	PAOK B	38	(0)
2026–	PAS Giannina	8	(0)

International career^{‡}
2019–2020	Greece U17	7	(1)
2021	Greece U19	2	(0)
- * Club domestic league appearances and goals as of 20 April 2026 ‡ National team caps and goals as of 4 September 2021

Vasilios Kitsakis (Greek: Βασίλειος Κιτσάκης; born 24 January 2003) is a Greek professional footballer who plays as a right-back for Super League 2 club PAS Giannina.
