= Panagiotis Panagiotou =

Greek footballer

Personal information
- Date of birth: 16 January 2002 (age 24)
- Place of birth: Ioannina, Greece
- Height: 1.87 m (6 ft 2 in)
- Position: Centre-back

Team information
- Current team: Kalamata
- Number: 18

Youth career
- –2015: AO Giannina
- 2015–2021: PAOK

Senior career*
Years	Team	Apps	(Gls)
2021–2024	PAOK B	59	(5)
2024–2025	Ethnikos Achna	22	(0)
2025–2026	PAS Giannina	13	(0)
2026–	Kalamata	3	(0)

International career^{‡}
2017–2018	Greece U16	5	(1)
2018–2019	Greece U17	10	(0)
2022–2024	Greece U21	8	(0)
- * Club domestic league appearances and goals as of 2 April 2026 ‡ National team caps and goals as of 26 March 2024

Panagiotis Panagiotou (Greek: Παναγιώτης Παναγιώτου, born 16 January 2002) is a Greek professional footballer who plays as a centre-back for Super League club Kalamata.

== Career ==
=== Early career ===
Panagiotis Panagiotou is a central defender and defensive midfielder. He was acquired from Giannina in 201s. He is a Greek international, and has celebrated the success of PAOK's Under-19 side (undefeated league championships. Despite his athletic career, he completed his education, and was admitted to the TEFAA of Thessaloniki.

== Career statistics ==
As of 2 April 2026

Club	Season	League			Cup		Continental		Other		Total	
Club	Season	Division	Apps	Goals	Apps	Goals	Apps	Goals	Apps	Goals	Apps	Goals
PAOK B	2021–22	Superleague Greece 2	29	3	—		—		—		29	3
PAOK B	2022–23	Superleague Greece 2	13	1	—		—		—		13	1
PAOK B	2023–24	Superleague Greece 2	22	1	—		—		—		22	1
PAOK B	Total		64	5	—		—		—		64	5
Ethnikos Achna	2024–25	Cypriot First Division	22	0	2	0	—		—		24	0
PAS Giannina	2025–26	Superleague Greece 2	13	0	0	0	—		—		13	0
Kalamata	2025–26	Superleague Greece 2	3	0	0	0	—		—		3	0
Career total			102	5	2	0	0	0	0	0	104	5
