= Angelos Tsiris =

Greek footballer

Personal information
- Date of birth: 18 August 2004 (age 22)
- Place of birth: Souli, Greece
- Height: 1.76 m (5 ft 9 in)
- Position: Midfielder

Team information
- Current team: Iraklis Thermaikos

Youth career
- 2018–2021: AEK Athens
- 2021–2022: PAS Giannina

Senior career*
Years	Team	Apps	(Gls)
2022–2026	PAS Giannina	16	(0)
2024	→ Giouchtas (loan)	13	(0)
2026–	Iraklis Thermaikos	0	(0)
- * Club domestic league appearances and goals as of 26 August 2026

Angelos Tsiris (Greek: Άγγελος Τσίρης; born 18 August 2004) is a Greek professional footballer who plays as a midfielder for Gamma Ethniki club Iraklis Thermaikos.
