= Dylan Flores =

Costa Rican footballer (born 1993)

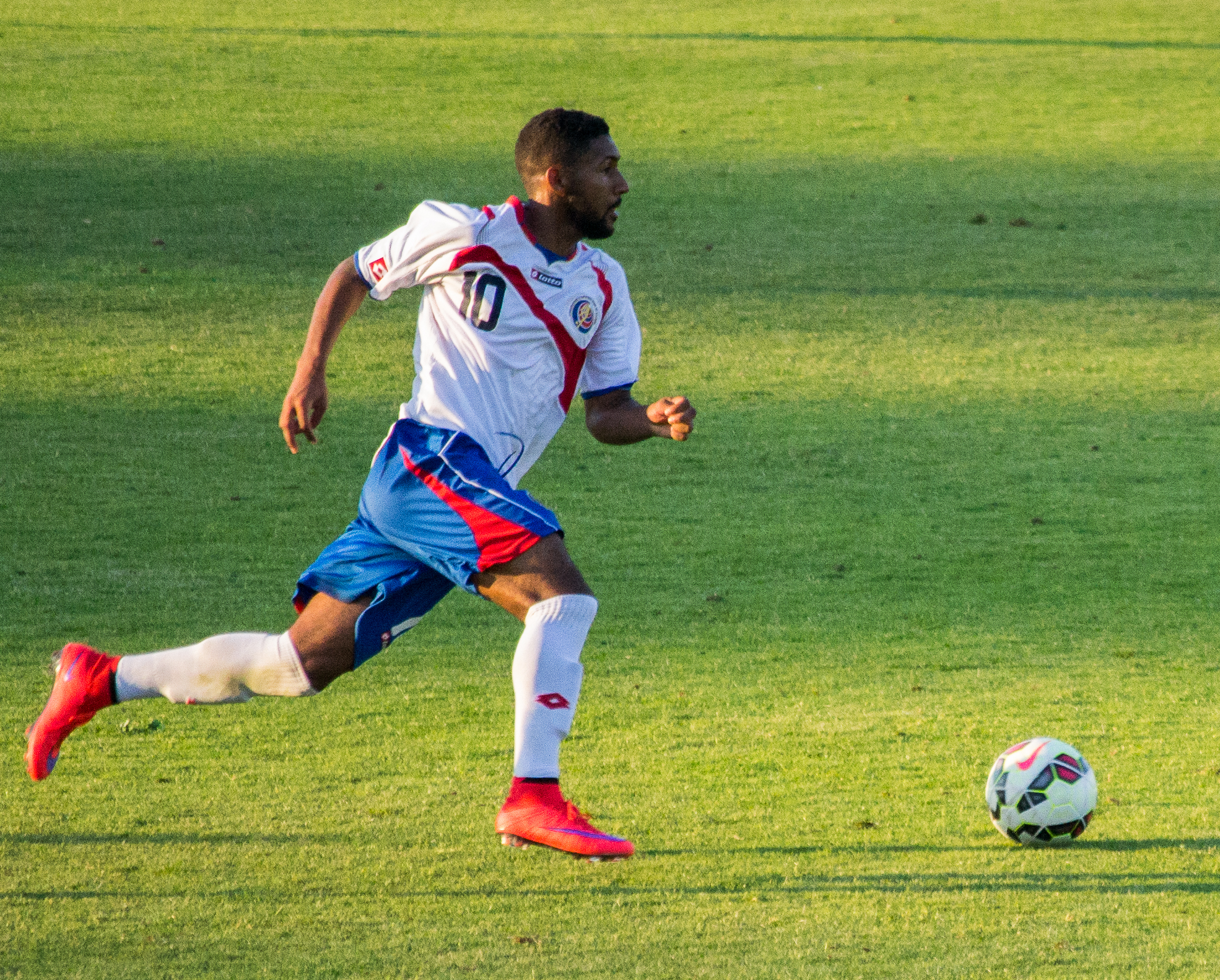
- Flores with Costa Rica U23 in 2015

Personal information
- Full name: Dylan Armando Flores Knowles
- Date of birth: 30 May 1993 (age 33)
- Place of birth: San José, Costa Rica
- Height: 1.75 m (5 ft 9 in)
- Position: Attacking midfielder

Youth career
- –2013: Saprissa

Senior career*
Years	Team	Apps	(Gls)
2013–2016	Saprissa	25	(3)
2014–2015	→ Uruguay de Coronado (loan)	28	(3)
2016–2017	Tondela	9	(0)
2017–2018	Cartaginés	33	(11)
2018–2019	Politehnica Iași	22	(7)
2019–2020	Sepsi OSK	24	(2)
2020–2021	Alajuelense	37	(2)
2021	Politehnica Iași	11	(1)
2021–2024	Cartaginés	124	(12)
2025	Marquense	24	(2)
2025	PAS Giannina	9	(0)

International career^{‡}
2009	Costa Rica U17	2	(0)
2011–2013	Costa Rica U20	14	(1)
2014–2016	Costa Rica U23	10	(2)
2018–2020	Costa Rica	4	(0)
- * Club domestic league appearances and goals as of 22:02, 20 October 2022 (UTC) ‡ National team caps and goals as of 27 October 2020 (UTC)

Dylan Armando Flores Knowles (born 30 May 1993) is a Costa Rican professional footballer who plays as an attacking midfielder.

== Club career ==
=== Politehnica Iași ===
In the summer of 2018, after an impressive season for Cartaginés in the Costa Rican top flight, Flores moved to Romanian Liga I club Politehnica Iași. He later signed a two-year contract with the Moldavian side and was given the number ten shirt. On 3 September 2018, Flores registered his first goal for his new club in a 3–0 league win over Concordia Chiajna.

== International career ==
Flores was called up for most of Costa Rica's youth teams, including Costa Rica U17, Costa Rica U20 and Costa Rica U23. On 17 November 2018, he made his full international debut for the Costa Rica national team, coming in as a substitute in a 3–2 victory over Chile.

=== International stats ===
As of match played 19 November 2019

Costa Rica national team
Year	Apps	Goals
2018	1	0
2019	3	0
Total	4	0

== Honours ==
=== Club ===
Deportivo Saprissa

- Liga FPD: 2013–14, 2015–16
- Costa Rican Cup: 2013
