= Vasilios Pavlidis (footballer) =

Greek footballer (born 2002)

Personal information
- Date of birth: 4 September 2002 (age 24)
- Place of birth: Thessaloniki, Greece
- Height: 1.86 m (6 ft 1 in)
- Position: Defender

Team information
- Current team: Anagennisi Deryneia

Youth career
- 2017–2021: Schalke 04

Senior career*
Years	Team	Apps	(Gls)
2021	Schalke 04	1	(0)
2021–2023	Jong AZ	5	(0)
2023	→ TOP Oss (loan)	6	(0)
2023–2024	TOP Oss	9	(0)
2024–2025	AEK Athens B	29	(0)
2025–2026	PAS Giannina	6	(0)
2026	Unia Skierniewice	4	(0)
2026–	Anagennisi Deryneia	0	(0)

International career
2017	Greece U16	4	(0)
2018–2019	Greece U17	10	(0)
- * Club domestic league appearances and goals as of 09:24, 31 May 2026 (UTC)

Vasilios Pavlidis (Greek: Βασίλειος Παυλίδης; born 4 September 2002) is a Greek professional footballer who plays as a defender for Cypriot Second Division club Anagennisi Deryneia.

== Career ==
On 31 January 2023, Pavlidis joined TOP Oss on loan until the end of the season.

On 3 July 2023, he returned to TOP Oss on a permanent basis, signing a one-year contract with an optional second year.

== Personal life ==
His brother is Vangelis Pavlidis.

== Honours ==
Unia Skierniewice

- II liga: 2025–26
