= Georgios Tourkochoritis =

Greek footballer

Personal information
- Date of birth: 12 January 2002 (age 24)
- Place of birth: Livadeia, Greece
- Height: 1.74 m (5 ft 9 in)
- Position: Right-back

Youth career
- 2016–2021: Panathinaikos

Senior career*
Years	Team	Apps	(Gls)
2021–2024	Panathinaikos B	59	(1)
2024–2025	Asteras Tripolis B	26	(0)
2025–2026	PAS Giannina	19	(0)

International career^{‡}
2022–2023	Greece U21	5	(0)
- * Club domestic league appearances and goals as of 30 June 2026 ‡ National team caps and goals as of 9 December 2023

Georgios Tourkochoritis (Greek: Γεώργιος Τουρκοχωρίτης; born 12 January 2002) is a Greek professional footballer who plays as a right-back.
