= Christos Kryparakos =

Greek footballer

Personal information
- Date of birth: 12 June 2003 (age 23)
- Place of birth: Athens, Greece
- Height: 1.74 m (5 ft 9 in)
- Position: Attacking midfielder

Team information
- Current team: Zakynthos
- Number: 11

Youth career
- 2015–2021: Panathinaikos

Senior career*
Years	Team	Apps	(Gls)
2021–2024	Panathinaikos B	67	(1)
2024–2026	Panathinaikos	0	(0)
2024–2025	→ Niki Volos (loan)	16	(1)
2025–2026	→ PAS Giannina (loan)	23	(1)
2026–	Zakynthos	0	(0)

International career^{‡}
2019	Greece U17	2	(0)
2021	Greece U19	5	(2)
2022–2024	Greece U21	10	(0)
- * Club domestic league appearances and goals as of 31 July 2026 ‡ National team caps and goals as of 26 March 2024

Christos Kryparakos (Greek: Χρήστος Κρυπαράκος; born 12 June 2003) is a Greek professional footballer who plays as a midfielder for Super League 2 club Zakynthos.

== Club career ==
Kryparakos joined the Panathinaikos youth academy in 2015, beginning his development within the club's youth system. He signed his first professional contract with Panathinaikos in April 2021, committing his future to the club on a three-year deal. In the following years, Kryparakos played for Panathinaikos B.

For the 2024–25 season, Kryparakos joined Niki Volos on loan, making 16 appearances and scoring one goal. The following season, 2025–26, Kryparakos joined PAS Giannina on loan, making 23 appearances and scoring one goal. On 3 October 2026, Kryparakos signed for Zakynthos on a free transfer.
