= Emiljano Bullari =

Albanian footballer (born 2001)

Personal information
- Full name: Emiljano Bullari
- Date of birth: 6 April 2001 (age 25)
- Place of birth: Naxos, Greece
- Height: 1.90 m (6 ft 3 in)
- Position: Forward

Team information
- Current team: Hellas Syrou
- Number: 9

Youth career
- 2007–2014: Agersani Naxos
- 2014–2015: PAS Naxos
- 2015–2020: Olympiacos

Senior career*
Years	Team	Apps	(Gls)
2017–2021	Olympiacos	0	(0)
2021	Atromitos	0	(0)
2023	Kalamata	13	(0)
2024	Egaleo	14	(3)
2024–2025	Laçi	29	(2)
2025–2026	PAS Giannina	26	(7)
2026–	Hellas Syrou	3	(1)

International career^{‡}
2016–2017	Albania U17	4	(2)
2018–2019	Albania U19	5	(1)
2019–2020	Albania U21	6	(2)
- * Club domestic league appearances and goals as of 19 September 2026 ‡ National team caps and goals as of 8 November 2025

Emiljano Bullari (born 6 April 2001) is a professional footballer who plays as a forward for Super League Greece 2 club Hellas Syrou. Born in Greece, he has represented Albania at youth level and has been called up to the senior national team but has yet to make his debut.

== Club career ==
=== Early career and Olympiacos ===
Bullari began playing football at age six with the local club Agersani Naxos in 2007. He later joined PAS Naxos before moving to Olympiacos in 2015 at age 14, where he also featured in the UEFA Youth League. In 2017, at age 16, he was promoted to Olympiacos' first team by Albanian coach Besnik Hasi, becoming the youngest player to sign a professional contract in the club's history. He made his first-team debut later that year due to an injury to Dimitrios Manos, during the tenure of coach Pedro Martins.

=== Atromitos ===
In 2020, Bullari joined Atromitos on a free transfer for one season.

After leaving Olympiacos, where competition for places was high, Bullari moved to Atromitos in the Super League Greece hoping for more first-team opportunities. According to Greek media, the transfer was initially encouraged by Austrian coach Damir Kanadi, who soon resigned, with new coach Pantelis Pantelidis choosing not to use him in competitive matches. Reports noted that before joining Atromitos, Bullari had also been close to signing with Newcastle United’s under-23 side in England, a move which ultimately fell through.

=== PS Kalamata ===
In the 2022–23 season, Bullari played for Kalamata in the Super League Greece 2, making 13 appearances without scoring.

=== Egaleo ===
In the 2023–24 season, he featured for Egaleo in Greek second division, making 14 appearances and scoring 3 goals.

=== Laçi ===
"I feel good playing in the Albanian championship, it is a very strong league. In football you sometimes score, sometimes not; today I am happy that we won and I managed to score."

— Bullari about his experience in the Kategoria Superiore.

On 9 August 2024, Bullari signed with Laçi in the Albanian Kategoria Superiore. He played 29 league games scoring 2 goals and added 3 cup appearances with 2 goals.

=== PAS Giannina ===
In September 2025, Bullari returned to Greece to play for PAS Giannina in the Super League Greece 2.

== International career ==
Born in Naxos, Greece, Bullari is of Albanian descent and has been part of the Albanian football structure since early adolescence. He has represented Albania at U17, U19, and U21 levels, playing for the under-17s in 2016–17 where he scored two goals in four appearances, for the under-19s in 2018–19 with one goal in five matches, and for the under-21s in 2019–20 with two goals in six appearances.

In November 2018, Albania U19 coach Erjon Bogdani called up Bullari to the national team, as the Albanian Football Federation won the competition against the Hellenic Football Federation who were also attempting to recruit him for Greece's youth national teams. Soon after, he scored for Albania U19 in a friendly match against Romania.

In October 2020, he was called up by senior team coach Edoardo Reja for the Albania national team, but was later released from the final squad and continued to feature with the under-21s instead.

With the under-21s, Bullari scored decisive goals in qualification matches, including a 3–1 victory over Andorra, and a last-minute equalizer in a 2–2 draw away against Turkey. Although called up to the senior squad, Bullari has yet to make his debut for the Albania national team.

== Style of play ==
Bullari is a tall and physical forward, standing at 1.90 m. He is known for his aerial ability, hold-up play, and finishing in one-on-one situations.

== Career statistics ==
=== Club ===
As of match played 8 November 2025

Appearances and goals by club, season and competition
Club	Season	League			Cup		Other		Total	
Club	Season	Division	Apps	Goals	Apps	Goals	Apps	Goals	Apps	Goals
Olympiacos	2017–18	Super League Greece	0	0	0	0	—		0	0
Olympiacos	2018–19	Super League Greece	0	0	0	0	—		0	0
Olympiacos	2019–20	Super League Greece	0	0	0	0	0	0	0	0
Atromitos	2020–21	Super League Greece	0	0	—		—		0	0
Atromitos	Total		0	0	0	0	0	0	0	0
Kalamata	2022–23	Super League Greece 2	13	0	—		—		13	0
Egaleo	2023–24	Super League Greece 2	14	3	—		—		14	3
Laçi	2024–25	Kategoria Superiore	29	2	3	2	—		32	4
Laçi	Total		56	5	3	2	—		59	7
PAS Giannina	2025–26	Super League Greece 2	9	2	0	0	—		9	2
Career total			65	7	3	2	0	0	68	9
