= Vasilios Kontonikos =

Greek footballer (born 2005)

Vasilis Kontonikos
Personal information
- Full name: Vasilios Kontonikos
- Date of birth: 11 October 2005 (age 21)
- Place of birth: Lamia, Greece
- Height: 1.83 m (6 ft 0 in)
- Position: Forward

Team information
- Current team: Athens Kallithea (on loan from AEK Athens)
- Number: 17

Youth career
- 2020–2022: Lamia

Senior career*
Years	Team	Apps	(Gls)
2022–2024	Lamia	8	(1)
2024–2025	AEK Athens B	12	(3)
2025–	AEK Athens	0	(0)
2025–2026	→ PAS Giannina (loan)	21	(2)
2026–	→ Athens Kallithea (loan)	3	(0)

International career^{‡}
2023–2024	Greece U19	10	(2)
- * Club domestic league appearances and goals as of 20 September 2026 ‡ National team caps and goals as of 23 March 2024

Vasilios Kontonikos (Greek: Βασίλειος Κοντονίκος; born 11 October 2005) is a Greek professional footballer who plays as a forward for Super League 2 club Athens Kallithea, on loan from AEK Athens.

== Career ==
=== Lamia ===
On 21 September 2022, Kontonikos signed a professional contract with Super League club Lamia. On 3 March 2024 he made his debut with the club in a 2–0 defeat against PAOK, coming in as a sub at the 81st minute. On 31 March 2024 he scored his first goal reducing to 3–1 against Aris at Kleanthis Vikelidis Stadium.

=== AEK Athens ===
On 24 July 2024, Kontonikos signed for AEK Athens and was assigned to their B team to play in the Super League Greece 2.

In September 2025, Kontonikos was loaned to PAS Giannina.

In July 2026, Kontonikos was loaned to Athens Kallithea.
