= Ermis Selimaj =

Albanian footballer

Personal information
- Date of birth: 25 May 2004 (age 22)
- Place of birth: Athens, Greece
- Height: 1.77 m (5 ft 10 in)
- Position: Left-back

Youth career
- 2021–2022: PAOK

Senior career*
Years	Team	Apps	(Gls)
2022–2025	PAOK B	21	(1)
2023–2025	PAOK	1	(0)
2024–2025	→ Niki Volos (loan)	5	(1)
2025	AEK Athens B	4	(0)
2025–2026	PAS Giannina	15	(0)

International career^{‡}
2023–	Albania U21	15	(0)
- * Club domestic league appearances and goals as of 22 April 2026 ‡ National team caps and goals as of 17 November 2025

Ermis Selimaj (born 2004) is a professional footballer who plays as a left-back.

Born in Greece, he is a youth international for the Albania national under-21 football team.
