= 2021–22 AEK Athens F.C. season =

AEK Athens
2021–22 season
- Chairman: Evangelos Aslanidis
- Manager: Vladan Milojević (until 8 October); Argiris Giannikis (until 1 March); Sokratis Ofrydopoulos
- Stadium: Athens Olympic Stadium
- Super League: 5th (After play-offs); 3rd (Regular season)
- Greek Cup: Quarter-finals
- UEFA Europa Conference League: Second qualifying round
- Top goalscorer: League: Sergio Araujo (12); All: Sergio Araujo (12)
- Highest home attendance: 28,883 (vs Olympiacos) (21 November 2021)
- Lowest home attendance: 1,000* (vs PAOK) (9 February 2022); *Due to COVID-19 government measures for maximum capacity.
- Average home league attendance: 10,083
- Biggest win: AEK Athens 4–0 A.E. Kifisia
- Biggest defeat: Panathinaikos 3–0 AEK Athens
Home colours	Away colours	Third colours

The 2021–22 season was the 98th season in the existence of AEK Athens F.C. and the 61st competitive season and seventh consecutive in the top flight of Greek football. They competed in the Super League, the Greek Cup and the Europa Conference League. The season began on 22 July 2021 and finished on 17 May 2022.

== Kits ==
Supplier: Nike
Sponsor(s): Pame stoixima
Features: Car.gr, LG Corp

Home	Away	Third

== Overview ==
After a season in which European participation was secured at the last moment, the decision was made to make changes across the squad. A search for a new manager, a new sporting director and many new signings were the task for the upcoming season. Dimitris Melissanidis chose Vladan Milojević as the new manager, who was known from his time in Greece both as a player and manager, as well as from his successful spell at Red Star Belgrade. Several transfers were made, with the permanent return of the old acquaintances, Ognjen Vranješ and Sergio Araujo, while international players, such as Cican Stanković, Georgios Tzavellas, Lazaros Rota, Ehsan Hajsafi, Milad Mohammadi and Nordin Amrabat also arrived. However, the transfer that stood out, was that of the Swiss international, Steven Zuber, who came as a loan. Players with great contribution in the previous seasons with the likes of Dmytro Chyhrynskyi, Hélder Lopes, Nenad Krstičić and Nélson Oliveira left the team.

The start of the season found AEK in the second qualifying round of the UEFA Europa Conference League, facing Velež Mostar, a relative "unknown" club in Europe with the only thing that the yellow-black fans knew about was that they were the team that Dušan Bajević began his football and managerial career. The match took place at Stadion Grbavica, away from their natural home, due to its unsuitability for holding European matches. AEK who were the undisputed favourite, entered the match well and managed to take an early lead with Ansarifard, but a mistake by Tsintotas brought the quick equalization for the Bosnians. AEK looked superior and should have taken the lead again, but a second goal by Ansarifard was wrongly ruled out for offside. As time went on, Velež started to increase their performance and eventually made the 2–1, which surprisingly remained as the final score that put AEK in trouble. The second leg and qualification were judged a week later at the Olympic Stadium. It was the first season that UEFA approved the proposal to abolish the away goals rule in all their competitions, thus the Greek club needed two goals to qualify at the normal time. The match from the beginning was a monologue for AEK, but the Bosnians were positioned correctly on the pitch and did not leave any free spaces. Time passed and AEK became more and more stressed, but in the final minutes of the stoppage time a goal by Mantalos, sent the match went to extra time, since the away goals rule no longer applied. Without anything changing, the match eventually went to penalty shootout, where the most humiliating elimination in the European history of AEK Athens took place, as they lost 2–3 by Velež Mostar.

The season had already started badly from very early on, but after the elimination the transfer moves were completed, and the team seemed ready in claiming titles. In the beginning, AEK showed that they had a quality roster, but they lacked the psychology and determination to compete for the title race. The first negative results of the team raised doubts to the administration about Milojević. Nevertheless, in October, the contract of Serbian manager was mutually terminated. AEK found themselves yet again looking for a manager in the midst of the season. Although most were in favor of a foreign experienced manager, Melissanidis decided to give a chance to the promising Argiris Giannikis, who had a very good presence for two seasons at PAS Giannina. As usual the change of manager initially brought some positive results, but it quickly became apparent that many things were missing from the team to emerge as real contenders for the title.

In the Cup, AEK making an extensive rotation and the manager giving time to players that didn't compete much during the previous games easily passed through A.E. Kifisia for the round of 16. In the quarter-finals they faced PAOK. Despite their good image at both legs, they were again eliminated by the club of Thessaloniki, after their collapse in the final minutes of the stoppage time of the second leg at home, where they conceded two goals, and the game was turned around for PAOK.

After bad results which included 3 home defeats and an embarrassing away 3–0 against Panathinaikos, brought the expected end to the tenure of Giannikis at AEK. The person who was called to close the season and try to achieve the minimum of the goals, that was a place in the next season's UEFA competitions, was the manager of the newly-formed B team, Sokratis Ofrydopoulos, as caretaker. Furthermore, with the initiative of Melissanidis, the Polish superstar, Grzegorz Krychowiak was brought to play just for the play-offs, in order to increase the chances of the team for a European ticket. AEK entered the play-offs at the 4th place and with consecutive matches that without a win, their goal was decided on the penultimate matchday at Kleanthis Vikelidis Stadium against Aris. AEK only wanted only victory, they entered the match well, they took a 0–2 lead and afterwards collapsed eventually losing by 3–2. AEK managed to stay out of Europe, in the worst year it had after their comeback from their relegation. The team had literally reached rock bottom and in the last and indifferent match of the year against Olympiacos at home, there were protests of the fans against the management and players, for the shameful year they had.

The situation at the club appeared difficult, with the administration having already reached an agreement with Matías Almeyda to take over as manager the following season. At the same time, preparations were nearing completion for their return to their natural home ground, the nearly completed Agia Sophia Stadium. The return to the stadium was therefore set to coincide with a period of significant sporting uncertainty for the club.

== Management team ==
Position	Staff
Manager	(Greece) Sokratis Ofrydopoulos
Assistant manager	(Greece) Ilias Kyriakidis
Goalkeeping coach	(Greece) Chrysostomos Michailidis
Fitness coach	(Greece) Pantelis Koustoumpekis
Fitness coach	(Greece) Sotiris Mavros
Academy director	(Greece) Ilias Kyriakidis
Academy manager	(Greece) Kostas Tsanas
U19 Manager	(Greece) Ilias Kalopitas
U17 Manager	(Serbia) Ivan Nedeljković
Technical director	(Greece) Panagiotis Kone
Executive director	(Greece) Giannis Papadimitriou
Scout	(Greece) Dimitrios Barbalias
Scout	(Greece) Stathis Tavlaridis
Head of Medical	(Greece) Lakis Nikolaou

- Source: aekfc.gr

== Players ==
=== Squad information ===
NOTE: The players are the ones that have been announced by the AEK Athens' press release. No edits should be made unless a player arrival or exit is announced. Updated 17 May 2022, 23:59 UTC+3.

No.	Player	Nat.	Position(s)	Date of birth (Age)	Signed	Previous club	Transfer fee	Contract until
Goalkeepers
1	Panagiotis Tsintotas	(Greece)	GK	4 July 1993 (aged 28)	2017	(Greece) Levadiakos	Free	2023
23	Cican Stanković	(Austria)	GK	4 November 1992 (aged 29)	2021	(Austria) Red Bull Salzburg	€1,150,000	2025
Defenders
2	Michalis Bakakis (Vice-captain 2)	(Greece)	RB / LB / CB / RM	18 March 1991 (aged 31)	2014	(Greece) Panetolikos	€250,000	2023
3	Milad Mohammadi	(Iran)	LB / LM / LW	29 September 1993 (aged 28)	2021	(Belgium) Gent	Free	2025
5	Stratos Svarnas	(Greece)	CB / RB	11 November 1997 (aged 24)	2018	(Greece) Xanthi	Free	2025
12	Lazaros Rota	(Greece) (Albania)	RB / RM	23 August 1997 (aged 24)	2021	(Netherlands) Fortuna Sittard	Free	2024
19	Clément Michelin	(France)	RB / RM	11 May 1997 (aged 25)	2021	(France) Lens	€1,000,000	2025
21	Ognjen Vranješ (Vice-captain 3)	(Bosnia and Herzegovina) (Serbia)	CB / RB	24 October 1989 (aged 32)	2021	(Belgium) Anderlecht	Free	2024
24	Gerasimos Mitoglou	(Greece)	CB	20 October 1999 (aged 22)	2021	(Greece) Volos	€300,000	2025
26	Ehsan Hajsafi	(Iran)	LB / LM / LW / AM / CM / DM	25 February 1990 (aged 32)	2021	(Iran) Sepahan	Free	2023
31	Georgios Tzavellas	(Greece)	CB / LB	26 October 1987 (aged 34)	2021	(Turkey) Alanyaspor	€400,000	2023
Midfielders
4	Damian Szymański	(Poland)	CM / DM / AM	16 June 1995 (aged 27)	2020	(Russia) Akhmat Grozny	1,300,000	2024
6	Damien Le Tallec	(France) (Russia)	DM / CB / CM	19 April 1990 (aged 32)	2021	(France) Montpellier	Free	2024
8	André Simões (Vice-captain)	(Portugal)	DM / CM	16 December 1989 (aged 32)	2015	(Portugal) Moreirense	Free	2022
14	Alexander Fransson	(Sweden)	CM / DM / AM / RM	2 April 1994 (aged 28)	2022	(Sweden) Norrköping	Free	2023
16	Grzegorz Krychowiak	(Poland)	DM / CM / CB / AM	29 January 1990 (aged 32)	2022	(Russia) Krasnodar	Free	2022
17	Steven Zuber	(Switzerland)	LM / LW / AM / RM / RW / SS / ST	17 August 1991 (aged 30)	2021	(Germany) Eintracht Frankfurt	€400,000	2022
20	Petros Mantalos (Captain)	(Greece)	AM / LM / CM / LW / SS / RM / RW	31 August 1991 (aged 30)	2014	(Greece) Xanthi	€500,000	2024
25	Konstantinos Galanopoulos (Vice-captain 4)	(Greece)	CM / DM	28 December 1997 (aged 24)	2015	(Greece) AEK Athens U20	—	2023
28	Yevhen Shakhov	(Ukraine)	CM / AM / DM	30 November 1990 (aged 31)	2020	(Italy) Lecce	Free	2022
88	Darko Jevtić	(Switzerland) (Serbia)	AM / CM / RM / LM / RW / LW / SS	23 February 1993 (aged 29)	2021	(Russia) Rubin Kazan	Free	2022
Forwards
7	Nordin Amrabat	(Morocco) (Netherlands)	RW / LW / RM / LM / AM / SS / ST	31 March 1987 (aged 35)	2021	(Saudi Arabia) Al Nassr	Free	2023
9	Levi García	(Trinidad and Tobago)	RW / RM / ST / SS / LW / LM	20 November 1997 (aged 24)	2020	(Israel) Beitar Jerusalem	€2,600,000	2025
10	Karim Ansarifard	(Iran)	ST	3 April 1990 (aged 32)	2020	(Qatar) Al-Sailiya	Free	2023
11	Sergio Araujo (Vice-captain 2)	(Argentina)	ST / SS / LW / RW	28 January 1992 (aged 30)	2021	(Spain) Las Palmas	€1,462,500	2024
22	Muamer Tanković	(Sweden) (Bosnia and Herzegovina)	LW / SS / RW / LM / RM / ST / AM	22 February 1995 (aged 27)	2020	(Sweden) Hammarby	Free	2024
Left during Summer Transfer Window
—	Hélder Lopes	(Portugal)	LB / LM / LW	4 January 1989 (aged 33)	2017	(Spain) Las Palmas	Free	2022
—	Christos Albanis	(Greece)	LW / RW / LM / RM / SS	4 November 1994 (aged 27)	2018	(Greece) Apollon Smyrnis	€400,000	2024
Left during Winter Transfer Window
33	Oleh Danchenko	(Ukraine)	RB / RM / LB / LM	1 August 1994 (aged 27)	2021	(Russia) Rubin Kazan	€400,000	2024
From AEK Athens B
30	Panagiotis Ginis	(Greece)	GK	23 January 1999 (aged 23)	2018	(Greece) AEK Athens U19	—	2023
61	Vasilios Chatziemmanouil	(Greece)	GK	9 August 1999 (aged 22)	2018	(Greece) AEK Athens U19	—	2025
99	Georgios Theocharis	(Greece)	GK	30 June 2002 (aged 20)	2020	(Greece) AEK Athens U19	—	2024
15	Žiga Laci	(Slovenia) (Hungary)	CB	20 July 2002 (aged 19)	2020	(Slovenia) Mura	€400,000	2026
37	Vedad Radonja	(Bosnia and Herzegovina)	RB / LB / RM / DM	6 September 2001 (aged 20)	2020	(Croatia) Dinamo Zagreb U19	Free	2025
40	Mario Mitaj	(Albania) (Greece)	LB / LM / LW	6 August 2003 (aged 18)	2020	(Greece) AEK Athens U17	—	2026
63	Georgios Kornezos	(Greece)	CB	23 February 1998 (aged 24)	2019	(Greece) Ethnikos Piraeus	Free	2022
44	Anel Šabanadžović	(Bosnia and Herzegovina) (United States)	CM / DM	24 May 1999 (aged 23)	2019	(Bosnia and Herzegovina) Željezničar	€450,000	2023
46	Konstantinos Roukounakis	(Greece)	DM / CM	17 July 2001 (aged 20)	2021	(Greece) AEK Athens U19	—	2026
80	Georgios Moustakopoulos	(Greece)	DM / CM / AM	13 August 1998 (aged 23)	2021	(Greece) Panachaiki	Free	2023
97	Judah García	(Trinidad and Tobago)	AM / LM / LW / CM	24 October 2000 (aged 21)	2021	(India) NEROCA	Free	2024
35	Michalis Kosidis	(Greece)	ST	9 February 2002 (aged 20)	2021	(Greece) AEK Athens U19	—	2026
52	Efthymis Christopoulos	(Greece)	ST / SS / RW / LW	20 September 2000 (aged 21)	2020	(Greece) AEK Athens U19	—	2023
77	Christos Giousis	(Greece)	RW / LW / RM / LM / SS / AM	8 October 1999 (aged 22)	2017	(Greece) AEK Athens U20	—	2022

== Transfers ==
=== In ===
==== Summer ====
No.	Pos.	Player	From	Fee	Date	Contract Until	Source
3	DF	(Iran) Milad Mohammadi	(Belgium) Gent	Free transfer	17 September 2021	30 June 2024	
6	MF	(France) Damien Le Tallec	(France) Montpellier	Free transfer	9 July 2021	30 June 2024	
7	FW	(Morocco) Nordin Amrabat	(Saudi Arabia) Al Nassr	Free transfer	16 August 2021	30 June 2023	
11	FW	(Argentina) Sergio Araujo	(Spain) Las Palmas	€1,462,500	16 July 2021	30 June 2024	
12	DF	(Greece) Lazaros Rota	(Netherlands) Fortuna Sittard	Free transfer	2 September 2021	30 June 2024	
18	DF	(Greece) Alexandros Parras	(Greece) Panetolikos	Free transfer	1 July 2021	30 June 2026	
19	DF	(France) Clément Michelin	(France) Lens	€1,000,000	5 August 2021	30 June 2025	
21	DF	(Bosnia and Herzegovina) Ognjen Vranješ	(Belgium) Anderlecht	Free transfer	19 July 2021	30 June 2024	
23	GK	(Austria) Cican Stanković	(Austria) Red Bull Salzburg	€1,150,000	1 June 2021	30 June 2025	
24	DF	(Greece) Gerasimos Mitoglou	(Greece) Volos	€300,000	11 June 2021	30 June 2025	
26	DF	(Iran) Ehsan Hajsafi	(Iran) Sepahan	Free transfer	2 August 2021	30 June 2023	
30	GK	(Greece) Panagiotis Ginis	(Greece) Ionikos	Loan return	1 July 2021	30 June 2023	
31	DF	(Greece) Georgios Tzavellas	(Turkey) Alanyaspor	€400,000	30 June 2021	30 June 2023	
32	MF	(Greece) Paris Babis	(Greece) Apollon Larissa	Loan return	1 July 2021	30 June 2022	
44	MF	(Bosnia and Herzegovina) Anel Šabanadžović	(Bosnia and Herzegovina) Željezničar	Loan return	1 July 2021	31 December 2023	
45	DF	(Greece) Stefanos Katsikas	(Greece) AEK Athens U19	Promotion	1 July 2021	30 June 2026	
46	MF	(Greece) Konstantinos Roukounakis	(Greece) AEK Athens U19	Promotion	1 July 2021	30 June 2026	
48	DF	(Greece) Michalis Bousis	(Greece) Apollon Larissa	Loan return	1 July 2021	30 June 2023	
63	DF	(Greece) Georgios Kornezos	(Greece) Asteras Vlachioti	Loan return	1 July 2021	30 June 2024	
77	FW	(Greece) Christos Giousis	(Greece) Panachaiki	Loan return	1 July 2021	30 June 2022	
91	FW	(Greece) Giannis Iatroudis	(Netherlands) Volendam	Loan return	1 July 2021	30 June 2024	
92	DF	(Greece) Konstantinos Stamoulis	(Greece) Lamia	Loan return	1 July 2021	30 June 2021	
94	DF	(Greece) Georgios Giannoutsos	(Greece) Episkopi	Loan return	1 July 2021	30 June 2021	
98	FW	(Serbia) Petar Karaklajić	(Serbia) Rad	Loan return	1 July 2021	30 June 2025	
—	DF	(Argentina) Emanuel Insúa	(Argentina) Aldosivi	Loan return	1 July 2021	30 June 2023	
—	MF	(Portugal) David Simão	(Portugal) Moreirense	Loan return	1 July 2021	30 June 2022	
—	FW	(Serbia) Miloš Deletić	(Greece) Lamia	Loan return	1 July 2021	30 June 2022	
—	FW	(Italy) Daniele Verde	(Italy) Spezia	Loan return	1 July 2021	30 June 2022	

==== Winter ====
No.	Pos.	Player	From	Fee	Date	Contract Until	Source
14	MF	(Sweden) Alexander Fransson	(Sweden) Norrköping	Free transfer	2 February 2022	30 June 2023	
—	DF	(Tunisia) Nassim Hnid	(Qatar) Al-Sailiya	Loan termination	16 February 2022	30 June 2024	
—	DF	(Argentina) Emanuel Insúa	(Argentina) Aldosivi	Loan return	1 January 2022	30 June 2023	

=== Out ===
==== Summer ====
No.	Pos	Player	To	Fee	Date	Source
3	DF	(Portugal) Hélder Lopes	(Israel) Hapoel Be'er Sheva	Free transfer	27 August 2021	
5	DF	(Romania) Ionuţ Nedelcearu	(Italy) Crotone	€1,200,000^{[a]}	16 July 2021	
6	MF	(Serbia) Nenad Krstičić	(Serbia) Red Star Belgrade	Contract termination	2 July 2021	
18	DF	(Greece) Alexandros Parras	(Greece) AEK Athens Β		1 August 2021	
18	FW	(Portugal) Nélson Oliveira	(Greece) PAOK	End of contract	9 July 2021	
19	DF	(Ukraine) Dmytro Chyhrynskyi	(Greece) Ionikos	End of contract	10 September 2021	
30	GK	(Greece) Panagiotis Ginis	(Greece) AEK Athens Β		1 August 2021	
32	MF	(Greece) Paris Babis	(Greece) AEK Athens Β		1 August 2021	
35	FW	(Greece) Michalis Kosidis	(Greece) AEK Athens Β		1 August 2021	
37	DF	(Bosnia and Herzegovina) Vedad Radonja	(Greece) AEK Athens Β		1 August 2021	
44	MF	(Bosnia and Herzegovina) Anel Šabanadžović	(Greece) AEK Athens Β		1 August 2021	
45	DF	(Greece) Stefanos Katsikas	(Greece) AEK Athens Β		1 August 2021	
46	MF	(Greece) Konstantinos Roukounakis	(Greece) AEK Athens Β		1 August 2021	
48	DF	(Greece) Michalis Bousis	(Greece) AEK Athens Β		1 August 2021	
51	MF	(Greece) Giannis Sardelis	(Greece) Panathinaikos	End of contract	18 August 2021	
52	FW	(Greece) Efthymis Christopoulos	(Greece) AEK Athens Β		1 August 2021	
61	GK	(Greece) Vasilios Chatziemmanouil	(Greece) AEK Athens Β		1 August 2021	
63	DF	(Greece) Georgios Kornezos	(Greece) AEK Athens Β		1 August 2021	
77	FW	(Greece) Christos Giousis	(Greece) AEK Athens Β		1 August 2021	
88	DF	(Greece) Stavros Vasilantonopoulos	(Greece) Atromitos	End of contract	1 July 2021	
91	FW	(Greece) Giannis Iatroudis	(Greece) AEK Athens Β		1 August 2021	
92	DF	(Greece) Konstantinos Stamoulis	(Greece) AEK Athens Β		1 August 2021	
94	DF	(Greece) Georgios Giannoutsos	(Greece) AEK Athens Β		1 August 2021	
98	FW	(Serbia) Petar Karaklajić	(Greece) AEK Athens Β		1 August 2021	
99	GK	(Greece) Georgios Theocharis	(Greece) AEK Athens Β		1 August 2021	
—	MF	(Portugal) David Simão	Free agent	Contract termination	31 August 2021	
—	FW	(Italy) Daniele Verde	(Italy) Spezia	€800,000	1 July 2021	

==== Winter ====
No.	Pos.	Player	To	Fee	Date	Source
—	DF	(Tunisia) Nassim Hnid	Free agent	Contract termination	16 February 2022	
—	DF	(Argentina) Emanuel Insúa	(Argentina) Vélez Sarsfield	Contract termination	19 January 2022	

Notes

a. plus €500,000 if Crotone gets promoted to Serie A

=== Loan in ===
==== Summer ====
No.	Pos.	Player	From	Fee	Date	Until	Option to buy	Source
17	MF	(Switzerland) Steven Zuber	(Germany) Eintracht Frankfurt	€400,000	30 August 2021	30 June 2022	✓	
88	MF	(Switzerland) Darko Jevtić	(Russia) Rubin Kazan	Free	31 August 2021	30 June 2022	✓	

==== Winter ====
No.	Pos.	Player	From	Fee	Date	Until	Option to buy	Source
16	MF	(Poland) Grzegorz Krychowiak	(Russia) Krasnodar	Free	15 March 2022	30 June 2022	✗	

=== Loan out ===
==== Summer ====
No.	Pos.	Player	To	Fee	Date	Until	Option to buy	Source
14	FW	(Greece) Christos Albanis	(Cyprus) Apollon Limassol	Free	31 August 2021	31 May 2022	✗	
26	DF	(Tunisia) Nassim Hnid	(Qatar) Al-Sailiya	Free	28 July 2021	30 June 2022	✓	
30	GK	(Greece) Georgios Athanasiadis	(Moldova) Sheriff Tiraspol	Free	18 June 2021	30 June 2022	✓	
53	FW	(Greece) Theodosis Macheras	(Greece) Ionikos	Free	4 August 2021	30 June 2022	✗	
—	DF	(Argentina) Emanuel Insúa	(Argentina) Aldosivi	Free	6 July 2021	31 December 2021	✗	
—	FW	(Serbia) Miloš Deletić	(Cyprus) Anorthosis Famagusta	Free	17 June 2021	30 June 2022	✓	

==== Winter ====
No.	Pos.	Player	To	Fee	Date	Until	Option to buy	Source
33	DF	(Ukraine) Oleh Danchenko	(Ukraine) Zorya Luhansk	Free	14 January 2022	30 June 2023	✓	

=== Contract renewals ===
No.	Pos.	Player	Date	Former Exp. Date	New Exp. Date	Source
15	DF	(Slovenia) Žiga Laci	8 July 2021	30 June 2023	30 June 2026	
40	DF	(Albania) Mario Mitaj	2 February 2021	31 December 2023	30 June 2026	

=== Overall transfer activity ===
==== Expenditure ====
Summer: ▼€4,712,500

Winter: ▼€0

Total: ▼€4,712,500

==== Income ====
Summer: ▲€2,000,000

Winter: ▲€0

Total: ▲€2,000,000

==== Net Totals ====
Summer: ▼€2,712,500

Winter: ▼€0

Total: ▼€2,712,500

== Pre-season and friendlies ==
30 June 2021 Friendly	Vitesse	1–3	AEK Athens	Burgh-Haamstede
18:00 EEST (UTC+3)	Oroz 36'	Report	Bakakis 17'; Albanis 37'; Macheras 83'	Stadium: Sportpark Van Zuijen

3 July 2021 Friendly	Feyenoord	3–1	AEK Athens	Rotterdam
14:30 EEST (UTC+3)	Linssen 29'; Bannis 32'; Sinisterra 38'	Report	Tanković 14'	Stadium: Varkenoord training center Attendance: 2,000; Referee: Allard Lindhout (Netherlands)

6 July 2021 Friendly	Royal Antwerp	0–2	AEK Athens	Gilze
18:00 EEST (UTC+3)		Report	Nedelcearu 52'; Albanis 66'	Stadium: Sportpark Vijf Eiken

9 July 2021 Friendly	Club Brugge	2–1	AEK Athens	Westkapelle
17:00 EEST (UTC+3)	De Ketelaere 2'; Pérez 86'	Report	Mitrović 57' (o.g.)	Stadium: Belfius Basecamp

15 July 2021 Friendly	AEK Athens	3–0	Apollon Limassol	Marousi
21:30 EEST (UTC+3)	García 6', 51'; Mantalos 9'	Report		Stadium: Olympic Stadium; Attendance: Behind closed doors Referee: Evangelos Manouchos (Argolida)

7 August 2021 Friendly	AEK Athens	2–0	Apollon Smyrnis	Spata
20:00 EEST (UTC+3)	Ansarifard 8'; García 50'	Report		Stadium: Spata Training Centre; Attendance: Behind closed doors Referee: Charalampos Tsoukalas (Athens)

14 August 2021 Friendly	AEK Athens	1–0	Lamia	Marousi
20:30 EEST (UTC+3)	Shakhov 69'	Report		Stadium: Olympic Stadium; Attendance: Behind closed doors Referee: Konstantinos Katikos (Athens)

21 August 2021 Friendly	AEK Athens	0–1	Asteras Tripolis	Marousi
20:00 EEST (UTC+3)	Laci (yellow card) 73'; Vranješ (yellow card) 75'	Report	Tilica (yellow card) 75'; Crespí (yellow card) 81'; Santafé 83'	Stadium: Olympic Stadium; Attendance: Behind closed doors Referee: Andreas Gamaris (Athens)

29 August 2021 Friendly	Volos	4–3	AEK Athens	Volos
19:00 EEST (UTC+3)	Barrientos 36' (pen.); Fernandes 49', 60'; Regattin 84' (pen.)	Report	Tanković 53', 75' (pen.); Ansarifard 86'	Stadium: Panthessaliko Stadium; Referee: Stefanos–Vaios Kalatzis (Thessaly)

27 September 2021 Friendly	AEK Athens	3–1	AEK Athens B	Spata
	Ansarifard	Report	Goal	Stadium: Spata Training Centre; Attendance: Behind closed doors

== Competitions ==
=== Overall record ===
Competition	First match	Last match	Starting round	Final position	Record							
Competition	First match	Last match	Starting round	Final position	Pld	W	D	L	GF	GA	GD	Win %
Super League	12 September 2021	6 March 2022	Matchday 1	3rd	26	14	4	8	42	28	+14	53.85
Super League Play-offs	13 March 2022	17 May 2022	Matchday 1	5th	10	2	4	4	14	14	+0	20.00
Greek Cup	1 December 2021	9 February 2022	Round of 16	Quarter-finals	8	7	0	1	19	3	+16	87.50
UEFA Europa Conference League	22 July 2021	29 July 2021	Second qualifying round	Second qualifying round	2	1	0	1	2	2	+0	50.00
Total					46	24	8	14	77	47	+30	52.17

Last updated: 17 May 2022
Source: Competitions

=== Super League Greece ===
==== Regular season ====
===== League table =====
Pos	Team	Pld	W	D	L	GF	GA	GD	Pts	Qualification
1	Olympiacos	26	20	5	1	47	14	+33	65	Qualification for the Play-off round
2	PAOK	26	16	5	5	50	24	+26	53	Qualification for the Play-off round
3	AEK Athens	26	14	4	8	42	28	+14	46	Qualification for the Play-off round
4	Aris	26	13	6	7	28	21	+7	45	Qualification for the Play-off round
5	Panathinaikos	26	13	3	10	41	21	+20	42	Qualification for the Play-off round

Source: Super League Greece
Rules for classification: 1) Points; 2) Head-to-head points; 3) Head-to-head goal difference; 4) Goal difference; 5) Goals scored; 6) Play-offs (neutral ground).
(Note: Criteria 6 is only used if needed to decide champion, teams for relegation or teams for UEFA competitions).

===== Results summary =====
Overall								Home						Away					
Pld	W	D	L	GF	GA	GD	Pts	W	D	L	GF	GA	GD	W	D	L	GF	GA	GD
26	14	4	8	42	28	+14	46	8	1	4	23	12	+11	6	3	4	19	16	+3

Last updated: 2022-03-06.
Source: Super League Greece

===== Results by Matchday =====
Round	1	2	3	4	5	6	7	8	9	10	11	12	13	14	15	16	17	18	19	20	21	22	23	24	25	26
Ground	H	A	H	A	A	H	A	H	A	H	A	H	A	A	H	A	H	H	A	H	A	H	A	H	A	H
Result	W	D	W	L	W	W	W	W	D	L	W	W	D	W	L	W	D	L	W	L	L	W	L	W	L	W
Position	2	3	2	5	4	4	2	2	2	2	2	2	2	2	2	2	3	3	3	3	3	3	3	3	3	3

Updated to match(es) played on 6 March 2021. Source: slgr.gr
A = Away; H = Home; W = Win; D = Draw; L = Loss; P = Postponed

===== Matches =====
12 September 2021 1	AEK Athens	3–0	Ionikos	Marousi
20:30 EEST (UTC+3)	Le Tallec 7', (yellow card) 85'; Mantalos (yellow card) 55'; Amrabat 62' (pen.); Zuber 67'	Report	Valerianos (yellow card) 24'; Romao (red card) 33'; Chyhrynskyi (yellow card) 51'; Mygas (yellow card) 62'	Stadium: Olympic Stadium; Attendance: 9,483; Referee: Giorgos Tzovaras (Phthiotis); Man of the Match: Steven Zuber

19 September 2021 2	OFI	3–3	AEK Athens	Heraklion
18:15 EEST (UTC+3)	Kamau (yellow card) 31'; Lamprou (yellow card) 36'; Neira (yellow card) 36', (goal) 77', 84'; Pasalidis (yellow card) 42'; Vouros (yellow card) 61', (goal) 90+2'	Report	Araujo 15'; García (red card) 36'; Zuber 41'; Ansarifard 64'	Stadium: Theodoros Vardinogiannis Stadium; Attendance: 3,127; Referee: Vasilis Fotias (Pella); Man of the Match: Juan Neira

22 September 2021 3	AEK Athens	1–0	Lamia	Marousi
20:30 EEST (UTC+3)	Araujo 67'; Shakhov (yellow card) 69'	Report	Tzandaris (yellow card) 30'; Romanić (yellow card) 36'; Saramantas (yellow card) 56'; Tsoukalos (yellow card) 86'	Stadium: Olympic Stadium; Attendance: 8,247; Referee: Spyros Zampalas (Epirus); Man of the Match: Sergio Araujo

26 September 2021 4	PAOK	2–0	AEK Athens	Thessaloniki
20:30 EEST (UTC+3)	Sidcley (yellow card) 39'; Biseswar 42'; Živković (yellow card) 71'; Kurtić 79' (pen.); Świderski (yellow card) 86'; Esiti (yellow card) 90+3'	Report	Ansarifard (yellow card) 65'; Le Tallec (yellow card) 80'	Stadium: Toumba Stadium; Attendance: 10,326; Referee: Paolo Valeri (Italy); Man of the Match: Diego Biseswar

3 October 2021 5	Panetolikos	1–3	AEK Athens	Agrinio
16:00 EEST (UTC+3)	Mendoza (yellow card) 37'; Cornelius (yellow card) 50'; Vergos 58'	Report	García 13'; Vranješ 26'; Simões (yellow card) 38'; Le Tallec (yellow card) 56'; Zuber 83'	Stadium: Panetolikos Stadium; Attendance: 1,402; Referee: Alexandros Tsakalidis (Chalkidiki); Man of the Match: Cican Stanković

17 October 2021 6	AEK Athens	3–0	Atromitos	Marousi
20:30 EEST (UTC+3)	Araujo 24'; Vranješ (yellow card) 36', (goal) 80'; Szymański (yellow card) 47'; Zuber 78' (pen.)	Report	Galvão (yellow card) 66'	Stadium: Olympic Stadium; Attendance: 11,043; Referee: Ioannis Papadopoulos (Macedonia); Man of the Match: Gerasimos Mitoglou

24 October 2021 7	Volos	1–3	AEK Athens	Volos
16:00 EEST (UTC+3)	Romero (yellow card) 29'; Regattin (penalty missed) 40'; Ferrari (yellow card) 44'; Grillo (yellow card) 44'; Vranješ 79' (o.g.); Bartolo (yellow card) 90+3'	Report	Ansarifard 42', (yellow card) 45+3'; Zuber 45+3'; Mantalos (yellow card) 61'; Le Tallec (yellow card) 86'; Hajsafi 90+8'	Stadium: Panthessaliko Stadium; Attendance: 3,554; Referee: Giorgos Tzovaras (Phthiotis); Man of the Match: Steven Zuber

31 October 2021 8	AEK Athens	2–1	Aris	Marousi
19:30 EET (UTC+2)	Rota (yellow card) 7'; Mitoglou 16', (red card) 71'; Mantalos 37' (pen.), (yellow card) 54'; Simões (yellow card) 85'; Tzavellas (yellow card) 90+5'; Vranješ (yellow card) 90+6'	Report	Fabiano (yellow card) 21'; Jeggo (yellow card) 41'; García 73'; Kamara (yellow card) 90+5'; Iturbe (yellow card) 90+6'	Stadium: Olympic Stadium; Attendance: 17,561; Referee: Aristotelis Diamantopoulos (Arcadia); Man of the Match: Cican Stankovic

6 November 2021 9	Apollon Smyrnis	2–2	AEK Athens	Rizoupoli
19:30 EET (UTC+2)	Baxevanidis (yellow card) 18'; Ioanndis 41', (yellow card) 75'; Pamldis 62'; Dentakis (yellow card) 86'; Castro (yellow card) 90'	Report	García 13'; Tzavellas (yellow card) 45+3'; Araujo (yellow card) 76', (goal) 80'	Stadium: Georgios Kamaras Stadium; Attendance: 2,867; Referee: João Pinheiro (Portugal); Man of the Match: Konstantinos Kotsaris

21 November 2021 10	AEK Athens	2–3	Olympiacos	Marousi
19:30 EET (UTC+2)	Araujo 15', 79'; Amrabat (yellow card) 86'	Report	A. Camara 1'; El-Arabi 34', 70'; M'Vila (yellow card) 76'	Stadium: Olympic Stadium; Attendance: 28,883; Referee: Fábio Veríssimo (Portugal); Man of the Match: Youssef El-Arabi

27 November 2021 11	PAS Giannina	1–2	AEK Athens	Ioannina
19:30 EET (UTC+2)	Erramuspe 5' (pen.); Karachalios (yellow card) 10'; Brener (yellow card) 52'; Perea (yellow card) 88'	Report	Amrabat 9'; Vranješ (yellow card) 33'; Szymański (yellow card) 50'; Shakhov 90'	Stadium: Zosimades Stadium; Referee: Dimitrios Karantonis (Imathia); Man of the Match: Yevhen Shakhov

5 December 2021 12	AEK Athens	1–0	Panathinaikos	Marousi
19:30 EET (UTC+2)	Szymański 2', (yellow card) 45+3'; Vranješ (yellow card) 6'; Simões (yellow card) 34'	Report	Maurício (yellow card) 68'	Stadium: Olympic Stadium; Attendance: 17,544; Referee: Tamás Bognár (Hungary); Man of the Match: Cican Stanković

11 December 2021 13	Asteras Tripolis	0–0	AEK Athens	Tripoli
19:30 EET (UTC+2)	Amrabat (yellow card) 26'; Vranješ (yellow card) 36'; Simões (yellow card) 61'	Report	Valiente (yellow card) 57'; García (yellow card) 85'	Stadium: Theodoros Kolokotronis Stadium; Attendance: 679; Referee: Dimitrios Karantonis (Imathia); Man of the Match: Giorgos Tzavellas

16 December 2021 14	Ionikos	0–1	AEK Athens	Nikaia
19:30 EET (UTC+2)	Kiakos (yellow card) 12'	Report	Mantalos 21'; Le Tallec (yellow card) 32'	Stadium: Neapoli Stadium; Attendance: 1,375; Referee: Konstantinos Perrakis (Athens); Man of the Match: Petros Mantalos

20 December 2021 15	AEK Athens	1–2	OFI	Marousi
19:30 EET (UTC+2)	Vranješ 14', (yellow card) 25'; Shakhov (yellow card) 17'; Ansarifard (yellow card) 48'; Amrabat (penalty missed) 87'	Report	Mellado (yellow card) 15'; Lamprou 23'; Kamau 60'; Marinakis (yellow card) 63'; Vouros (yellow card) 82'; Balogiannis (yellow card) 87'	Stadium: Olympic Stadium; Attendance: 4,651; Referee: Stefanos Koubarakis (Thrace); Man of the Match: Lazaros Lamprou

5 January 2022 16	Lamia	0–2	AEK Athens	Lamia
17:15 EET (UTC+2)	Tzandaris (yellow card) 41'; Tzanetopoulos (yellow card) 77'	Report	Ansarifard (yellow card) 18'; García 29'; Szymański (yellow card) 47'; Amrabat (yellow card) 49', (goal) 83'; Simões (yellow card) 88'; Svarnas (yellow card) 90'	Stadium: Lamia Municipal Stadium; Attendance: 439; Referee: Aristotelis Diamantopoulos (Arcadia); Man of the Match: Nordin Amrabat

2 March 2022 17	AEK Athens	1–1	PAOK	Marousi
20:30 EET (UTC+2)	Szymański (yellow card) 11'; García 28'; Vranješ (yellow card) 41'; Rota (yellow card) 54'	Report	Tsingaras (red card) 19'; Živković (yellow card) 25'; Kurtić 36'; Crespo (yellow card) 89'	Stadium: Olympic Stadium; Attendance: 4,541; Referee: Michael Fabbri (Italy); Man of the Match: Petros Mantalos
Note: The match was originally scheduled to be held on 9 January, but was postponed due to the increasing COVID-19 cases in PAOK's team.

16 January 2022 18	AEK Athens	1–2	Panetolikos	Marousi
17:15 EET (UTC+2)	Ansarifard 44'; Simões (yellow card) 56'	Report	Karelis 79'; Mendoza 84', (yellow card) 85'	Stadium: Olympic Stadium; Attendance: Behind closed doors Referee: Andreas Gamaris (Athens); Man of the Match: Javier Mendoza

23 January 2022 19	Atromitos	0–2	AEK Athens	Peristeri
17:15 EET (UTC+2)	Koulouris (yellow card) 45+3'; Charisis (yellow card) 63'; Muñiz (red card) 65'	Report	Tzavellas 23'; Ansarifard (yellow card) 33'; Mantalos (yellow card) 45+3'; Zuber 51'; Szymański (yellow card) 64'; Rota (yellow card) 66'	Stadium: Peristeri Stadium; Referee: Efstathios Gortsilas (Macedonia); Man of the Match: Levi García

30 January 2022 20	AEK Athens	1–2	Volos	Marousi
17:15 EET (UTC+2)	Zuber (penalty missed) 8'; Araujo 20'; Tzavellas (yellow card) 84'; Rota (yellow card) 88'	Report	Van Weert 16', 85' (pen.), (yellow card) 26' (yellow-red card) 87'; Oroz (yellow card) 70'	Stadium: Olympic Stadium; Attendance: Behind closed doors Referee: Evangelos Manouchos (Argolida); Man of the Match: Tom van Weert

2 February 2022 21	Aris	2–1	AEK Athens	Thessaloniki
19:30 EET (UTC+2)	Ndiaye 44'; Kamara (yellow card) 48'; Šakić 90+5'	Report	Tzavellas (yellow card) 64'; Simões (yellow card) 66'; Hajsafi (yellow card) 74'; Araujo 85'; Tanković (yellow card) 86'	Stadium: Kleanthis Vikelidis Stadium; Attendance: 967; Referee: Adrián Cordero Vega (Spain); Man of the Match: Badou Ndiaye

6 February 2022 22	AEK Athens	3–0	Apollon Smyrnis	Marousi
15:00 EET (UTC+2)	Le Tallec (yellow card) 35'; Mohammadi (yellow card) 47' (yellow-red card) 79'; Araujo 52', 71'; Zuber 67'	Report	Lisgaras (yellow card) 10'; Jakimovski (yellow card) 57'; Ioannidis (yellow card) 10'	Stadium: Olympic Stadium; Attendance: Behind closed doors Referee: Angelos Evangelou (Athens); Man of the Match: Sergio Araujo

13 February 2022 23	Olympiacos	1–0	AEK Athens	Piraeus
19:30 EET (UTC+2)	Reabciuk (yellow card) 62'; M'Vila 84'; Lala (yellow card) 90+4'	Report	Rota (yellow card) 81'	Stadium: Karaiskakis Stadium; Attendance: 400; Referee: Orel Grinfeld (Israel); Man of the Match: Yann M'Vila

20 February 2022 24	AEK Athens	2–0	PAS Giannina	Marousi
19:30 EET (UTC+2)	Mantalos 69'; Hajsafi (yellow card) 72'; Ansarifard 88'	Report	Erramuspe (yellow card) 77'	Stadium: Olympic Stadium; Attendance: 5,202; Referee: Ioannis Papadopoulos (Macedonia); Man of the Match: Lazaros Rota

27 February 2022 25	Panathinaikos	3–0	AEK Athens	Ampelokipoi
19:30 EET (UTC+2)	Aitor 16' (pen.); Palacios 18'; Ioannidis 29'; Pérez (yellow card) 33'	Report	Rota (yellow card) 15'; Mantalos (yellow card) 73'; Le Tallec (yellow card) 84'	Stadium: Leoforos Alexandras Stadium; Attendance: 5,943; Referee: António Nobre (Portugal); Man of the Match: Aitor Cantalapiedra

6 March 2022 26	AEK Athens	2–1	Asteras Tripolis	Marousi
19:00 EET (UTC+2)	Araujo 24'; Simões (yellow card) 33'; Michelin (yellow card) 76'; Tzavellas 81'; Szymański (yellow card) 90+1' (yellow-red card) 90+5'	Report	Álvarez (yellow card) 18'; Atienza (yellow card) 23'; Barrales 56'; Valiente (yellow card) 70'; Munafo (yellow card) 79'	Stadium: Olympic Stadium; Attendance: 3,258; Referee: Anastasios Sidiropoulos (Dodecanese); Man of the Match: Sergio Araujo

==== Play-off round ====
===== Table =====
Pos	Team	Pld	W	D	L	GF	GA	GD	Pts	Qualification
1	Olympiacos (C)	36	25	8	3	62	26	+36	83	Qualification for the Champions League second qualifying round
2	PAOK	36	19	7	10	58	33	+25	64	Qualification for the Europa Conference League second qualifying round
3	Aris	36	18	8	10	39	28	+11	62	Qualification for the Europa Conference League second qualifying round
4	Panathinaikos	36	18	7	11	52	26	+26	61	Qualification for the Europa Conference League third qualifying round (Note: Panathinaikos qualified for the Europa Conference League third qualifying round by winning the Greek Cup.)
5	AEK Athens	36	16	8	12	56	42	+14	56	
6	PAS Giannina	36	12	10	14	34	42	−8	46	

Source: Super League Greece
Rules for classification: 1) Points; 2) Head-to-head points (Regular season and play-off); 3) Head-to-head goal difference (Regular season and play-off); 4) Regular season position.
(C) Champions

===== Results summary =====
Overall								Home						Away					
Pld	W	D	L	GF	GA	GD	Pts	W	D	L	GF	GA	GD	W	D	L	GF	GA	GD
10	2	4	4	14	14	0	10	1	1	3	6	6	0	1	3	1	8	8	0

Last updated: 2022-05-17.
Source: Super League Greece

===== Results by Matchday =====
Round	1	2	3	4	5	6	7	8	9	10
Ground	A	H	A	H	A	A	H	H	A	H
Result	D	L	D	L	W	D	D	W	L	L
Position	3	3	3	5	5	5	5	5	5	5

Updated to match(es) played on 14 May 2022. Source: slgr.gr
A = Away; H = Home; W = Win; D = Draw; L = Loss; P = Postponed

===== Matches =====
13 March 2022 1	Panathinaikos	1–1	AEK Athens	Ampelokipoi
19:30 EET (UTC+2)	Aitor 4'; Kourbelis (yellow card) 33'; Dioudis (yellow card) 45+1'; Maurício (yellow card) 61'	Report	Simões (yellow card) 33'; Amrabat (yellow card) 36', (goal) 45+2' (pen.)	Stadium: Leoforos Alexandras Stadium; Attendance: 5,497; Referee: Nikola Dabanović (Montenegro); Man of the Match: Nordin Amrabat

20 March 2022 2	AEK Athens	0–1	PAOK	Marousi
19:30 EET (UTC+2)		Report	Tsingaras (yellow card) 45+1'; Čolak 50'; Jabá (yellow card) 68'; Ingason (yellow card) 77'	Stadium: Olympic Stadium; Attendance: 8,075; Referee: Jorgen Burhart (Denmark); Man of the Match: Alexandru Mitriță

3 April 2022 3	Olympiacos	1–1	AEK Athens	Piraeus
20:00 EEST (UTC+3)	A. Camara (yellow card) 19'; Carvalho 30'	Report	Szymański 43', (yellow card) 73'	Stadium: Karaiskakis Stadium; Attendance: 17,015; Referee: Aliyar Aghayev (Azerbaijan); Man of the Match: Yann M'Vila

10 April 2022 4	AEK Athens	1–2	Aris	Marousi
19:30 EEST (UTC+3)	Krychowiak (yellow card) 2'; Rota 28', (yellow card) 90+2'; Amrabat (yellow card) 41'; Zuber (yellow card) 56'	Report	Palma 20'; Sasha 59'; Benalouane (yellow card) 70'; Bertoglio (yellow card) 90+2'; Delizisis (yellow card) 90+5'	Stadium: Olympic Stadium; Attendance: 10,252; Referee: Robert Madden (Scotland); Man of the Match: Fabiano

18 April 2022 5	PAS Giannina	2–3	AEK Athens	Ioannina
18:00 EEST (UTC+3)	Perea 52', 90'; Gardawski (yellow card) 54'; Saliakas (yellow card) 76'	Report	Krychowiak 4'; Rota 45+2'; Araujo 69'; Mantalos (yellow card) 72'; Shakhov (yellow card) 90+2'	Stadium: Zosimades Stadium; Attendance: 2,032; Referee: Evangelos Manouchos (Argolida); Man of the Match: Grzegorz Krychowiak

1 May 2022 6	PAOK	1–1	AEK Athens	Thessaloniki
21:00 EEST (UTC+3)	Čolak 27'; Mitriță (yellow card) 58'; Sastre (yellow card) 81'	Report	Amrabat 15'; Rota (yellow card) 43'; Hajsafi (yellow card) 61'; Krychowiak (yellow card) 67'; Tzavellas (yellow card) 73'; Mitoglou (yellow card) 73'; Amrabat (yellow card) 88'	Stadium: Toumba Stadium; Attendance: 6,922; Referee: Georgi Kabakov (Bulgaria); Man of the Match: Antonio Čolak

8 May 2022 7	AEK Athens	0–0	Panathinaikos	Marousi
19:30 EEST (UTC+3)	García (yellow card) 37'; Tzavellas (yellow card) 40'; Mitoglou (yellow card) 43'; Mantalos (yellow card) 90+5'	Report	Villafáñez (yellow card) 39'; Aitor (yellow card) 43'; Kourbelis (yellow card) 99'; Palacios (yellow card) 90+4'	Stadium: Olympic Stadium; Attendance: 15,519; Referee: Matej Jug (Slovenia); Man of the Match: Damian Szymański

11 May 2022 8	AEK Athens	3–0	PAS Giannina	Marousi
19:30 EEST (UTC+3)	Hajsafi 39'; Amrabat 45+2' (pen.); Krychowiak 59'; Mantalos (yellow card) 69'	Report	Siontis (yellow card) 88'	Stadium: Olympic Stadium; Attendance: 4,271; Referee: Aristotelis Diamantopoulos (Arcadia); Man of the Match: Grzegorz Krychowiak

14 May 2022 9	Aris	3–2	AEK Athens	Thessaloniki
21:00 EEST (UTC+3)	Matilla (yellow card) 51'; Palma 78'; Mancini 85'; M. García 90+3'	Report	Krychowiak (yellow card) 51'; L. García 53', 59'; Amrabat (yellow card) 56'; Mantalos (yellow card) 66'; Szymański (yellow card) 90'	Stadium: Kleanthis Vikelidis Stadium; Attendance: 10,338; Referee: Bobby Madden (Scotland); Man of the Match: Luis Palma

17 May 2022 10	AEK Athens	2–3	Olympiacos	Marousi
20:00 EEST (UTC+3)	Zuber 14'; Mohammadi (yellow card) 31'; García 48'; Michelin (yellow card) 82'	Report	El-Arabi 20', 69', 87'; Masouras (yellow card) 58'	Stadium: Olympic Stadium; Attendance: 2,717; Referee: Danny Makkelie (Netherland); Man of the Match: Youssef El-Arabi

=== Greek Cup ===
AEK entered the Greek Cup at the round of 16.

==== Round of 16 ====
1 December 2021 First leg	AEK Athens	4–0	A.E. Kifisia	Marousi
20:15 EET (UTC+2)	Jevtić (yellow card) 24'; Ansarifard 52'; Svarnas 57'; Tanković 71'; Hajsafi 74'	Report	Doriva (yellow card) 50'; Papasavvas (yellow card) 60'	Stadium: Olympic Stadium; Attendance: 1,507; Referee: Aristidis Vatsios (West Attica); Man of the Match: Darko Jevtić

23 December 2021 Second leg	A.E. Kifisia	1–1 (1–5 agg.)	AEK Athens	Kaisariani
19:00 EET (UTC+2)	Mkrtchyan (yellow card) 37'; Tetteh 73'; Tolios (yellow card) 80'	Report	Mitoglou (yellow card) 4'; García 55'	Stadium: Michalis Kritikopoulos Stadium; Referee: Anastasios Sidiropoulos (Dodecanese); Man of the Match: Andrews Tetteh

==== Quarter-finals ====
19 January 2022 First leg	PAOK	0–0	AEK Athens	Thessaloniki
19:00 EET (UTC+2)	Akpom (yellow card) 68'; Kurtić (yellow card) 90+1'; Świderski (yellow card) 90+4'	Report	Simões (yellow card) 41'; Tsintotas (yellow card) 68'; Mitoglou (yellow card) 68'; Zuber (yellow card) 90+1'	Stadium: Toumba Stadium; Attendance: Behind closed doors Referee: István Vad (Hungary); Man of the Match: Alexandros Paschalakis

9 February 2022 Second leg	AEK Athens	1–2 (1–2 agg.)	PAOK	Marousi
20:00 EET (UTC+2)	Rota (yellow card) 73'; Simões 83'	Report	Akpom (yellow card) 30'; Sidcley (yellow card) 37'; Kurtić 90+5', (yellow card) 90+5'; Mitriță 90+7'	Stadium: Olympic Stadium; Attendance: 1,000; Referee: Andreas Ekberg (Sweden); Man of the Match: Jasmin Kurtić
Note: The game was originally scheduled for January 26, but was postponed due to heavy snowfall in Attica.

=== UEFA Europa Conference League ===
==== Second qualifying round ====
The draw for the second qualifying round was held on 16 June 2021.

22 July 2021 First leg	Velež Mostar (Bosnia and Herzegovina)	2–1	(Greece) AEK Athens	Sarajevo, Bosnia and Herzegovina
21:30 EEST (UTC+3)	Pršeš 14'; Anđušić (yellow card) 40'; Zajmović 53'; Hasanović (yellow card) 57'; Ferreyra (yellow card) 80'; Ćosić (yellow card) 85'	Report	Ansarifard 12'; Mantalos (yellow card) 58'; Shakhov (yellow card) 64'; Tanković (yellow card) 85'; Le Tallec (yellow card) 90+3'	Stadium: Stadion Grbavica; Attendance: 6,128; Referee: Nathan Verboomen (Belgium)

29 July 2021 Second leg	AEK Athens (Greece)	1–0 (a.e.t.) (2–2 agg.) (2–3 p)	(Bosnia and Herzegovina) Velež Mostar	Athens, Greece
21:00 EEST (UTC+3)	Vranješ (yellow card) 45+1'; Mitaj (yellow card) 46'; Mantalos 90+8'; Shakhov (yellow card) 101'; Szymański (yellow card) 110'; Lopes (yellow card) 120'	Report	Zajmović (yellow card) 32'; Ćosić (yellow card) 57'; Cvijanović (yellow card) 82'; Vehabović (yellow card) 90'; Ovčina (yellow card) 102'	Stadium: Olympic Stadium; Attendance: 5,160; Referee: Kevin Clancy (Scotland)
	Penalties
	Ansarifard (penalty missed); Tzavellas (penalty scored); Shakhov (penalty scored); Lopes (penalty missed); Araujo (penalty missed)		(penalty missed) Georgijević; (penalty scored) Brandao; (penalty missed) Vehabović; (penalty scored) Cvijanović; (penalty scored) Zvonić

== Statistics ==
=== Squad statistics ===
As of 17 May 2022

No.	Pos	Player	Super League		Super League Play-offs		Greek Cup		Europa Conference League		Total	
No.	Pos	Player	Apps	Goals	Apps	Goals	Apps	Goals	Apps	Goals	Apps	Goals
Goalkeepers
1	GK	(Greece) Panagiotis Tsintotas	12	0	1	0	4	0	1	0	18	0
23	GK	(Austria) Cican Stanković	13	0	9	0	0	0	1	0	23	0
Defenders
2	DF	(Greece) Michalis Bakakis	0	0	0	0	0	0	2	0	2	0
3	DF	(Iran) Milad Mohammadi	17	0	8	0	3	0	0	0	28	0
5	DF	(Greece) Stratos Svarnas	7	0	2	0	3	1	2	0	14	1
12	DF	(Greece) Lazaros Rota	14	0	9	2	4	0	0	0	27	2
19	DF	(France) Clément Michelin	19	0	4	0	1	0	0	0	24	0
21	DF	(Bosnia and Herzegovina) Ognjen Vranješ	20	3	0	0	2	0	1	0	23	3
24	DF	(Greece) Gerasimos Mitoglou	14	1	9	0	3	0	0	0	26	1
26	DF	(Iran) Ehsan Hajsafi	19	1	9	1	4	1	2	0	34	3
31	DF	(Greece) Georgios Tzavellas	20	2	8	0	3	0	2	0	33	2
Midfielders
4	MF	(Poland) Damian Szymański	24	1	7	1	3	0	2	0	36	2
6	MF	(France) Damien Le Tallec	20	1	4	0	4	0	2	0	30	1
8	MF	(Portugal) André Simões	19	0	2	0	2	1	0	0	23	1
14	MF	(Sweden) Alexander Fransson	0	0	1	0	0	0	0	0	1	0
16	MF	(Poland) Grzegorz Krychowiak	0	0	9	2	0	0	0	0	9	2
17	MF	(Switzerland) Steven Zuber	25	7	10	1	3	0	0	0	38	8
20	MF	(Greece) Petros Mantalos	22	3	9	0	0	0	2	1	33	4
25	MF	(Greece) Konstantinos Galanopoulos	1	0	0	0	0	0	0	0	1	0
28	MF	(Ukraine) Yevhen Shakhov	20	1	3	0	1	0	2	0	26	1
88	MF	(Switzerland) Darko Jevtić	15	0	1	0	3	0	0	0	19	0
Forwards
7	FW	(Morocco) Nordin Amrabat	21	3	8	3	2	0	0	0	31	6
9	FW	(Trinidad and Tobago) Levi García	23	4	10	3	4	1	2	0	39	8
10	FW	(Iran) Karim Ansarifard	23	4	6	0	4	1	2	1	35	6
11	FW	(Argentina) Sergio Araujo	21	11	6	1	2	0	2	0	31	12
22	FW	(Sweden) Muamer Tanković	11	0	7	0	2	1	2	0	22	1
Left during Summer Transfer Window
—	DF	(Portugal) Hélder Lopes	0	0	0	0	0	0	2	0	2	0
—	FW	(Greece) Christos Albanis	0	0	0	0	0	0	2	0	2	0
Left during Winter Transfer Window
33	DF	(Ukraine) Oleh Danchenko	0	0	0	0	0	0	0	0	0	0
From AEK Athens B
30	GK	(Greece) Panagiotis Ginis	0	0	0	0	0	0	0	0	0	0
61	GK	(Greece) Vasilios Chatziemmanouil	1	0	0	0	0	0	0	0	1	0
99	GK	(Greece) Georgios Theocharis	0	0	0	0	0	0	0	0	0	0
15	DF	(Slovenia) Žiga Laci	0	0	0	0	1	0	0	0	1	0
37	DF	(Bosnia and Herzegovina) Vedad Radonja	0	0	0	0	0	0	0	0	0	0
40	DF	(Albania) Mario Mitaj	0	0	1	0	0	0	0	0	1	0
63	DF	(Greece) Georgios Kornezos	0	0	1	0	0	0	0	0	1	0
44	MF	(Bosnia and Herzegovina) Anel Šabanadžović	0	0	0	0	0	0	0	0	0	0
46	MF	(Greece) Konstantinos Roukounakis	0	0	0	0	0	0	0	0	0	0
80	MF	(Greece) Georgios Moustakopoulos	0	0	1	0	1	0	0	0	2	0
97	MF	(Trinidad and Tobago) Judah García	0	0	0	0	0	0	0	0	0	0
52	FW	(Greece) Efthymis Christopoulos	0	0	0	0	0	0	0	0	0	0
35	FW	(Greece) Michalis Kosidis	2	0	0	0	1	0	0	0	3	0
77	FW	(Greece) Christos Giousis	1	0	0	0	0	0	0	0	1	0

=== Goalscorers ===
As of 17 May 2022
The list is sorted by competition order when total goals are equal, then by position and then by squad number.

Rank	No.	Pos.	Player	Super League	Super League Play-offs	Greek Cup	Europa Conference League	Total
1	11	FW	(Argentina) Sergio Araujo	11	1	0	0	12
2	17	MF	(Switzerland) Steven Zuber	7	1	0	0	8
2	9	FW	(Trinidad and Tobago) Levi García	4	3	1	0	8
4	10	FW	(Iran) Karim Ansarifard	4	0	1	1	6
4	7	FW	(Morocco) Nordin Amrabat	3	3	0	0	6
6	20	MF	(Greece) Petros Mantalos	3	0	0	1	4
7	21	DF	(Bosnia and Herzegovina) Ognjen Vranješ	3	0	0	0	3
7	26	DF	(Iran) Ehsan Hajsafi	1	1	1	0	3
9	31	DF	(Greece) Georgios Tzavellas	2	0	0	0	2
9	4	MF	(Poland) Damian Szymański	1	1	0	0	2
9	16	MF	(Poland) Grzegorz Krychowiak	0	2	0	0	2
9	12	DF	(Greece) Lazaros Rota	0	0	0	2	2
13	24	DF	(Greece) Gerasimos Mitoglou	1	0	0	0	1
13	6	MF	(France) Damien Le Tallec	1	0	0	0	1
13	28	MF	(Ukraine) Yevhen Shakhov	1	0	0	0	1
13	5	DF	(Greece) Stratos Svarnas	0	0	1	0	1
13	8	MF	(Portugal) André Simões	0	0	1	0	1
13	22	FW	(Sweden) Muamer Tanković	0	0	1	0	1
Own goals				0	0	0	0	0
Totals				42	12	6	4	64

=== Assists ===
As of 17 May 2022
The list is sorted by competition order when total assists are equal, then by position and then by squad number.

Rank	No.	Pos.	Player	Super League	Super League Play-offs	Greek Cup	Europa Conference League	Total
1	20	MF	(Greece) Petros Mantalos	10	1	0	0	11
2	9	FW	(Trinidad and Tobago) Levi García	3	1	1	0	5
3	17	MF	(Switzerland) Steven Zuber	3	1	0	0	4
3	88	MF	(Switzerland) Darko Jevtić	1	0	3	0	4
5	7	FW	(Morocco) Nordin Amrabat	2	1	0	0	3
5	4	MF	(Poland) Damian Szymański	2	1	0	0	3
7	19	DF	(France) Clément Michelin	2	0	0	0	2
7	3	DF	(Iran) Milad Mohammadi	2	0	0	0	2
7	26	DF	(Iran) Ehsan Hajsafi	0	2	0	0	2
7	16	MF	(Poland) Grzegorz Krychowiak	0	2	0	0	2
11	12	DF	(Greece) Lazaros Rota	1	0	0	0	1
11	22	FW	(Sweden) Muamer Tanković	1	0	0	0	1
11	10	FW	(Iran) Karim Ansarifard	1	0	0	0	1
11	14	FW	(Greece) Christos Albanis	0	0	0	1	1
11	11	FW	(Argentina) Sergio Araujo	0	0	0	1	1
Totals				28	9	4	2	43

=== Clean sheets ===
As of 17 May 2022
The list is sorted by competition order when total clean sheets are equal and then by squad number. Clean sheets in games where both goalkeepers participated are awarded to the goalkeeper who started the game. Goalkeepers with no appearances are not included.

Rank	No.	Player	Super League	Super League Play-offs	Greek Cup	Europa Conference League	Total
1	1	(Greece) Panagiotis Tsintotas	5	0	2	0	7
1	23	(Austria) Cican Stanković	4	2	0	1	7
2	61	(Greece) Vasilios Chatziemmanouil	1	0	0	0	1
Totals			10	2	2	1	15

=== Disciplinary record ===
As of 17 May 2022

N	P	Nat.	Name	Super League			Super League Play-offs			Greek Cup			Europa Conference League			Total			Notes
N	P	Nat.	Name	Yellow card	Second yellow card	Red card	Yellow card	Second yellow card	Red card	Yellow card	Second yellow card	Red card	Yellow card	Second yellow card	Red card	Yellow card	Second yellow card	Red card	Notes
Goalkeepers
1	GK	(Greece)	Panagiotis Tsintotas							1						1			
23	GK	(Austria)	Cican Stanković																
Defenders
2	DF	(Greece)	Michalis Bakakis																
3	DF	(Iran)	Milad Mohammadi	2	1		1									3	1		
5	DF	(Greece)	Stratos Svarnas	1												1			
12	DF	(Greece)	Lazaros Rota	6			2			1						9			
19	DF	(France)	Clément Michelin	1			1									2			
21	DF	(Bosnia and Herzegovina)	Ognjen Vranješ	7									1			8			
24	DF	(Greece)	Gerasimos Mitoglou			1	2			2						4		1	
26	DF	(Iran)	Ehsan Hajsafi	2			1									3			
31	DF	(Greece)	Georgios Tzavellas	4			2			1						7			
Midfielders
4	MF	(Poland)	Damian Szymański	7			1						1			9			
6	MF	(France)	Damien Le Tallec	7									1			8			
8	MF	(Portugal)	André Simões	8			1			1						10			
14	MF	(Sweden)	Alexander Fransson																
16	MF	(Poland)	Grzegorz Krychowiak				3									3			
17	MF	(Switzerland)	Steven Zuber				1									1			
20	MF	(Greece)	Petros Mantalos	5			4						1			10			
25	MF	(Greece)	Konstantinos Galanopoulos																
28	MF	(Ukraine)	Yevhen Shakhov	2			1						2			5			
88	MF	(Switzerland)	Darko Jevtić							1						1			
Forwards
7	FW	(Morocco)	Nordin Amrabat	3			4									7			
9	FW	(Trinidad and Tobago)	Levi García			1	1									1		1	
10	FW	(Iran)	Karim Ansarifard	5												5			
11	FW	(Argentina)	Sergio Araujo	1												1			
22	FW	(Sweden)	Muamer Tanković	1												1			
Left during Summer Transfer window
—	DF	(Portugal)	Hélder Lopes										1			1			
—	FW	(Greece)	Christos Albanis																
Left during Winter Transfer window
33	DF	(Ukraine)	Oleh Danchenko																
From AEK Athens B
30	GK	(Greece)	Panagiotis Ginis																
61	GK	(Greece)	Vasilios Chatziemmanouil																
99	GK	(Greece)	Georgios Theocharis																
15	DF	(Slovenia)	Žiga Laci																
37	DF	(Bosnia and Herzegovina)	Vedad Radonja																
40	DF	(Albania)	Mario Mitaj										1			1			
63	DF	(Greece)	Georgios Kornezos																
44	MF	(Bosnia and Herzegovina)	Anel Šabanadžović																
46	MF	(Greece)	Konstantinos Roukounakis																
80	MF	(Greece)	Georgios Moustakopoulos																
97	MF	(Trinidad and Tobago)	Judah García																
35	FW	(Greece)	Michalis Kosidis																
52	FW	(Greece)	Efthymis Christopoulos																
77	FW	(Greece)	Christos Giousis																

=== Starting 11 ===
This section presents the most frequently used formation along with the players with the most starts across all competitions.

N.	Formation	Matchday(s)
38	4–2–3–1	1–26
3	4–3–3
1	3–4–3

No.	Nat.	Player	Pos.
23	(Austria)	Cican Stanković	GK
24	(Greece)	Gerasimos Mitoglou	RCB
31	(Greece)	Georgios Tzavellas	LCB
12	(Greece)	Lazaros Rota	RB
3	(Iran)	Milad Mohammadi	LB
4	(Poland)	Damian Szymański	DM
26	(Iran)	Ehsan Hajsafi	CM
9	(Trinidad and Tobago)	Levi García	RM
17	(Switzerland)	Steven Zuber	LM
20	(Greece)	Petros Mantalos (C)	AM
11	(Argentina)	Sergio Araujo	CF

Last updated: 2022-05-17

== Awards ==
Player	Pos.	Award	Source
(Switzerland) Steven Zuber	MF	Interwetten Best Goal (1st Matchday)	
(Switzerland) Steven Zuber	MF	Interwetten Player of the Month (September)	
(Argentina) Sergio Araujo	FW	Interwetten Best Goal (3rd Matchday)	
(Switzerland) Steven Zuber	MF	Interwetten Best Goal (7th Matchday)	
(Argentina) Sergio Araujo	FW	Interwetten Best Goal (9th Matchday)	
(Morocco) Nordin Amrabat	FW	Interwetten Best Goal (11th Matchday)	
(Trinidad and Tobago) Levi García	FW	Interwetten Best Goal (16th Matchday)	
(Argentina) Sergio Araujo	FW	Interwetten Best Goal (21st Matchday)	
(Argentina) Sergio Araujo	FW	Interwetten Best Goal (22nd Matchday)	
(Greece) Petros Mantalos	MF	Interwetten Best Goal (24th Matchday)	
(Greece) Lazaros Rota	DF	Interwetten Best Goal Playoffs/Playouts (4th Matchday)	
(Greece) Lazaros Rota	DF	Interwetten Best Goal Playoffs/Playouts (5th Matchday)	
(Argentina) Sergio Araujo	FW	Interwetten Player of the Club	
(Argentina) Sergio Araujo	FW	Goal of the Season	
(Argentina) Sergio Araujo	FW	Team of the Season	
(Argentina) Sergio Araujo	FW	Fair Play of the Season	
