= List of Greek football transfers winter 2024–25 =

This is a list of Greek football transfers winter 2024–25.

== Super League Greece ==
=== AEK Athens ===
In:

No.	Pos.	Nation	Player

Out:

No.	Pos.	Nation	Player
11	FW	TRI	Levi García (to (Russia) Spartak Moscow)
—	FW	MAR	Nordin Amrabat (to (England) Hull City)
—	FW	SUI	Steven Zuber (to (Switzerland) Zürich)
—	FW	GRE	Konstantinos Galanopoulos (to (Cyprus) APOEL)

=== Aris ===
In:

No.	Pos.	Nation	Player
—	FW	CRO	Dario Špikić (on loan FROM (Croatia) Dinamo Zagreb)
—	MF	BRA	Dudu Rodrigues (from (Bulgaria) Cherno More)

Out:

No.	Pos.	Nation	Player

=== Asteras Tripolis ===
In:

No.	Pos.	Nation	Player
—	DF	USA	Nicholas Gioacchini (from (Italy) Como)

Out:

No.	Pos.	Nation	Player
—	MF	GRE	Panagiotis Tzimas (to A.E. Kifisia)

=== Athens Kallithea ===
In:

No.	Pos.	Nation	Player
24	MF	CMR	François Mughe (on loan from (France) Marseille)
17	FW	FRA	Migouel Alfarela (on loan from (Poland) Legia Warsaw)
11	FW	FRA	Keelan Lebon (from (Azerbaijan) Neftçi)

Out:

No.	Pos.	Nation	Player

=== Atromitos ===
In:

No.	Pos.	Nation	Player

Out:

No.	Pos.	Nation	Player

=== Lamia ===
In:

No.	Pos.	Nation	Player
99	FW	EGY	Bilal Mazhar (from (Portugal) Estrela da Amadora)

Out:

No.	Pos.	Nation	Player

=== Levadiakos ===
In:

No.	Pos.	Nation	Player
—	DF	ISR	Joel Abu Hanna (from (Israel) Maccabi Netanya)

Out:

No.	Pos.	Nation	Player

=== OFI ===
In:

No.	Pos.	Nation	Player
—	DF	GRE	Thanasis Androutsos (from Olympiacos)
—	MF	PAR	Franco Zanelatto (from (Peru) Alianza Lima)
—	MF	URU	Kevin Lewis (from (Uruguay) Danubio)

Out:

No.	Pos.	Nation	Player

=== Olympiacos ===
In:

No.	Pos.	Nation	Player
—	DF	BRA	Ramon (end of loan (Portugal) Rio Ave)
—	MF	NGA	Bruno Onyemaechi (on loan to (Portugal) Boavista)
—	MF	POR	André Horta (loan from (Portugal) Braga)
—	MF	HON	Luis Palma (loan from (Scotland) Celtic)
—	FW	CRO	Ivan Brnić (loan return from (Slovenia) Celje)

Out:

No.	Pos.	Nation	Player
—	DF	ENG	Nelson Abbey (on loan to (Portugal) Rio Ave)
—	DF	GRE	Andreas Ntoi (to (Portugal) Rio Ave)
—	DF	GRE	Isidoros Koutsidis (to Volos)
—	DF	ENG	Nelson Abbey (on loan to (Wales) Swansea City)
—	DF	GRE	Andreas Ntoi (to (Portugal) Rio Ave)
—	DF	GRE	Thanasis Androutsos (to OFI)
—	FW	MLI	Diby Keita (to Egaleo)
—	FW	ESP	Jefté Betancor (Loan to Panserraikos)
—	DF	GRE	Apostolos Apostolopoulos (to Panetolikos)
—	MF	GRE	Georgios Masouras (Loan to (Germany) VfL Bochum)
—	DF	BRA	Ramon (to (Brazil) Internacional)

=== Panathinaikos ===
In:

No.	Pos.	Nation	Player
—	MF	POL	Karol Świderski (from (United States) Charlotte FC)
—	MF	GRE	Manolis Siopis (from (Wales) Cardiff City)

Out:

No.	Pos.	Nation	Player
—	DF	SVN	Benjamin Verbič (Relesead)
—	MF	HUN	László Kleinheisler (to (Austria) Grazer AK)

=== Panetolikos ===
In:

No.	Pos.	Nation	Player
—	DF	GRE	Apostolos Apostolopoulos (from Olympiacos)
—	FW	GRE	Andrews Tetteh (Loan from A.E. Kifisia)

Out:

No.	Pos.	Nation	Player

=== Panserraikos ===
In:

No.	Pos.	Nation	Player
71	DF	BRA	Volnei Feltes (from (Portugal) Estoril)
—	FW	ESP	Jefté Betancor (Loan from Olympiacos)

Out:

No.	Pos.	Nation	Player

=== PAOK ===
In:

No.	Pos.	Nation	Player
—	MF	BEL	Stephane Omeonga (from (Israel) Bnei Sakhnin)
—	MF	PER	Sergio Peña (from (Sweden) Malmö FF)
—	FW	FIN	Simon Skrabb (from (Sweden) Kalmar)

Out:

No.	Pos.	Nation	Player
—	MF	POL	Mateusz Wieteska (Loan to (Italy) Cagliari)

=== Volos ===
In:

No.	Pos.	Nation	Player
—	MF	GRE	Lazaros Lamprou (on loan from (Poland) Raków Częstochowa)
—	MF	GRE	Lefteris Tasiouras (from PAOK B)
—	MF	FIN	Simon Skrabb (from (Finland) Kalmar)
—	MF	ISL	Hjörtur Hermannsson (from (Italy) Carrarese)
—	MF	GRE	Isidoros Koutsidis (loan from Olympiacos)
—	MF	ESP	Nacho Gil (from (United States) New England Revolution)
—	MF	GRE	Stefanos Katsikas (from AEK Athens B)

Out:

No.	Pos.	Nation	Player
—	DF	CYP	Pavlos Korrea (to (Hungary) Nyíregyháza)
—	MF	ISR	Omri Altman (to (Israel) Maccabi Bnei Reineh)
—	MF	ARG	Lucas Villafáñez (to A.E. Kifisia)

== Super League Greece 2 ==
=== AEK Athens B ===
In:

No.	Pos.	Nation	Player

Out:

No.	Pos.	Nation	Player
—	MF	GRE	Stefanos Katsikas (to Volos)
—	MF	GRE	Konstantinos Roukounakis (to A.E. Kifisia)

=== A.E. Kifisia ===
In:

No.	Pos.	Nation	Player
—	MF	GRE	Oresti Kacurri (from Chania)
—	MF	ARG	Lucas Villafáñez (from Volos)
—	MF	GRE	Konstantinos Roukounakis (from AEK Athens B)
—	MF	GRE	Panagiotis Tzimas (from Asteras Tripolis)
—	MF	ARG	Luciano Maidana (from (Argentina) Club Atlético Los Andes)
—	MF	BRA	Lucas Poletto (from Panachaiki)
—	MF	URU	Federico Gino (from PAS Giannina)

Out:

No.	Pos.	Nation	Player
—	FW	GRE	Andrews Tetteh (Loan to Panetolikos)

=== Chania ===
In:

No.	Pos.	Nation	Player

Out:

No.	Pos.	Nation	Player
—	MF	GRE	Oresti Kacurri (to A.E. Kifisia)
21	DF	POL	Patryk Stępiński (to (Bulgaria) Lokomotiv Plovdiv)

=== Egaleo ===
In:

No.	Pos.	Nation	Player
—	FW	MLI	Diby Keita (from Olympiacos)

Out:

No.	Pos.	Nation	Player

=== Kalamata ===
In:

No.	Pos.	Nation	Player

Out:

No.	Pos.	Nation	Player
—	FW	BRA	Elivelto (to (Lithuania) Panevėžys)

=== AEL Larissa ===
In:

No.	Pos.	Nation	Player
—	DF	GRE	Petros Bagalianis (from (Poland) Stal Mielec)

Out:

No.	Pos.	Nation	Player

=== Panachaiki ===
In:

No.	Pos.	Nation	Player

Out:

No.	Pos.	Nation	Player
—	MF	BRA	Lucas Poletto (to A.E. Kifisia)

=== Panionios ===
In:

No.	Pos.	Nation	Player
—	MF	EST	Ioan Yakovlev (from (Estonia) Levadia)

Out:

No.	Pos.	Nation	Player

=== PAOK B ===
In:

No.	Pos.	Nation	Player

Out:

No.	Pos.	Nation	Player
—	MF	GRE	Lefteris Tasiouras (to Volos)

=== PAS Giannina ===
In:

No.	Pos.	Nation	Player
—	FW	GRE	Kido Taylor-Hart (from (England) Arsenal)
—	FW	GRE	Vasilis Kaperdas (from GS Ilioupolis)
—	FW	GRE	Ilias Simantarakis (from OFI)
—	FW	GRE	Fotios Gogas (from PAS Giannina U-19)
—	FW	GRE	Nikos Tzovaras (from PAS Giannina U-19)

Out:

No.	Pos.	Nation	Player
—	DF	ESP	Carles Soria (to Lamia)
—	MF	URU	Federico Gino (to A.E. Kifisia)
—	MF	GRE	Konstantinos Lampsias (Loan return to Panathinaikos)
—	FW	GRE	Kido Taylor-Hart (Released)
—	FW	SRB	Stefan Šćepović (to (Serbia) Beograd)

=== Iraklis ===
In:

No.	Pos.	Nation	Player
—	FW	CIV	Jean Morel Poé (from (Ukraine) Kryvbas Kryvyi Rih)

Out:

No.	Pos.	Nation	Player
