= 2021–22 Super League Greece =

86th season of top-tier football league in Greece

Super League 1
- Season: 2021–22
- Dates: 11 September 2021 – 17 May 2022
- Champions: Olympiacos; 47th Greek title
- Relegated: Apollon Smyrnis
- Champions League: Olympiacos
- Europa Conference League: PAOK; Aris; Panathinaikos
- Matches: 237
- Goals: 560 (2.36 per match)
- Best player: Aias Aosman
- Top goalscorer: Tom van Weert (17 goals)
- Biggest home win: Asteras Tripolis 6–2 Atromitos (27 November 2021)
- Biggest away win: Aris 0–5 PAS Giannina (20 November 2021)
- Highest scoring: PAOK 4–4 Volos (17 October 2021); Asteras Tripolis 6–2 Atromitos (27 November 2021)
- Longest winning run: Olympiacos (10 wins)
- Longest unbeaten run: Olympiacos (25 games)
- Longest winless run: Atromitos (9 games)
- All statistics correct as of 4 May 2022.

The 2021–22 Super League Greece, known as Super League 1 Interwetten for sponsorship reasons, was the 86th season of the Super League Greece, the top Greek professional league for association football clubs, since its establishment in 1959. Olympiacos were the defending champions.

== Teams ==
Locations of the 2021–22 Super League Greece teams

Fourteen teams competed in the league – the top twelve teams from the previous season, the play-off winner and one team promoted from Super League 2. The first club to be promoted was Ionikos, after beating Ergotelis 2–1 on 19 May 2021. Ionikos played in the Super League for the first time since the 2006–07 season. AEL were relegated to 2021–22 Super League Greece 2, ending their four-year stay in the top flight.

Promoted from 2020–21 Super League Greece 2	Relegated from 2020–21 Super League Greece
Ionikos	AEL

=== Stadiums and locations ===
Team	Location	Stadium	Capacity	2020–21
AEK Athens	Athens (Marousi)	Athens Olympic Stadium	69,618	4th
Apollon Smyrnis	Athens (Rizoupoli)	Georgios Kamaras Stadium	14,200	11th
Aris	Thessaloniki (Charilaou)	Kleanthis Vikelidis Stadium	22,800	3rd
Asteras Tripolis	Tripoli	Theodoros Kolokotronis Stadium	7,442	6th
Atromitos	Athens (Peristeri)	Peristeri Stadium	10,050	8th
Ionikos	Piraeus (Nikaia)	Neapoli Stadium	6,000	1st (SL2)
Lamia	Lamia	Lamia Municipal Stadium	5,500	10th
OFI	Heraklion	Theodoros Vardinogiannis Stadium	9,088	12th
Olympiacos	Piraeus (Neo Faliro)	Karaiskakis Stadium	32,115	1st
Panathinaikos	Athens (Ampelokipoi)	Leoforos Alexandras Stadium	16,003	5th
Panetolikos	Agrinio	Panetolikos Stadium	7,321	13th
PAOK	Thessaloniki (Toumba)	Toumba Stadium	28,703	2nd
PAS Giannina	Ioannina	Zosimades Stadium	7,652	9th
Volos	Volos	Panthessaliko Stadium	22,700	7th

=== Personnel, kits and TV channel ===
Team	Manager	Captain	Kit manufacturer	Shirt sponsor	Broadcast Channel
AEK Athens	(Greece) Sokratis Ofrydopoulos	(Greece) Petros Mantalos	Nike	Pame Stoixima	Cosmote TV
Apollon Smyrnis	(Greece) Babis Tennes	(Greece) Christos Lisgaras	Hummel	Venetis Bakery	Cosmote TV
Aris	(Argentina) Germán Burgos	(Greece) Georgios Delizisis	Adidas	Net Bet	Nova Sports
Asteras Tripolis	(Serbia) Milan Rastavac	(Argentina) Matías Iglesias	Macron	Volton	Nova Sports
Atromitos	(Wales) Chris Coleman	(Greece) Kyriakos Kivrakidis	Capelli	Net Bet	Nova Sports
Ionikos	(Greece) Dimitris Spanos	(Togo) Alaixys Romao	Macron	Shopflix.gr	Cosmote TV
Lamia	(Italy) Gianluca Festa	(Greece) Loukas Vyntra	Macron	Interwetten	Cosmote TV
OFI	(Greece) Nikos Nioplias	(Greece) Nikos Korovesis	Puma	OPAP	Cosmote TV
Olympiacos	(Portugal) Pedro Martins	(Greece) Andreas Bouchalakis	Adidas	Stoiximan	Nova Sports
Panathinaikos	(Serbia) Ivan Jovanović	(Greece) Dimitrios Kourbelis	Kappa	Pame Stoixima	Cosmote TV
Panetolikos	(Greece) Giannis Anastasiou	(Uruguay) Jorge Díaz	Givova	Shopflix.gr	Cosmote TV
PAOK	(Romania) Răzvan Lucescu	(Portugal) Vieirinha	Macron	Stoiximan	Nova Sports
PAS Giannina	(Greece) Iraklis Metaxas	(Greece) Stefanos Siontis	Le Coq Sportif	Net Bet	Nova Sports
Volos	(Greece) Kostas Bratsos	(Greece) Tasos Tsokanis	Luanvi	Interwetten	Cosmote TV

=== Managerial changes ===
Team	Outgoing manager	Manner of departure	Date of vacancy	Position in table	Incoming manager	Date of appointment
Volos	(Greece) Kostas Bratsos (caretaker)	End of tenure as caretaker	16 May 2021	Pre-season	(Spain) Guille Abascal	17 May 2021
Panathinaikos	(Greece) Sotiris Sylaidopoulos (caretaker)	End of tenure as caretaker	16 May 2021	Pre-season	(Serbia) Ivan Jovanović	25 May 2021
AEK Athens	(Spain) Manolo Jiménez	Sacked	16 May 2021	Pre-season	(Serbia) Vladan Milojević	25 May 2021
PAS Giannina	(Greece) Argiris Giannikis	End of contract	19 May 2021	Pre-season	(Greece) Iraklis Metaxas	4 June 2021
Atromitos	(Greece) Savvas Pantelidis	End of contract	20 Μay 2021	Pre-season	(Spain) Ángel López	26 May 2021
PAOK	(Uruguay) Pablo García	Sacked	22 May 2021	Pre-season	(Romania) Răzvan Lucescu	26 May 2021
Apollon Smyrnis	(Greece) Makis Chavos	Sacked	28 May 2021	Pre-season	(Greece) Giannis Petrakis	1 June 2021
Panetolikos	(Greece) Traianos Dellas	Resigned	6 June 2021	Pre-season	(Greece) Giannis Anastasiou	9 June 2021
Apollon Smyrnis	(Greece) Giannis Petrakis	Sacked	23 September 2021	13th	(Italy) Gianluca Festa	24 September 2021
Atromitos	(Spain) Ángel López	Sacked	24 September 2021	11th	(Greece) Georgios Paraschos	25 September 2021
AEK Athens	(Serbia) Vladan Milojević	Sacked	8 October 2021	4th	(Greece) Argiris Giannikis	10 October 2021
Volos	(Spain) Guille Abascal	Sacked	5 December 2021	8th	(Greece) Kostas Bratsos (caretaker)	6 December 2021
Atromitos	(Greece) Georgios Paraschos	Sacked	20 December 2021	13th	(Greece) Giorgos Korakakis (caretaker)	21 December 2021
Atromitos	(Greece) Giorgos Korakakis (caretaker)	Sacked	6 January 2022	13th	(Wales) Chris Coleman	7 January 2022
Aris Thessaloniki	(Greece) Akis Mantzios	Sacked	14 February 2022	8th	(Greece) Apostolos Terzis (caretaker)	15 February 2022
Aris Thessaloniki	(Greece) Apostolos Terzis (caretaker)	End of tenure as caretaker	20 February 2022	8th	(Argentina) Germán Burgos	21 February 2022
Apollon Smyrnis	(Italy) Gianluca Festa	Sacked	25 February 2022	14th	(Greece) Babis Tennes	26 February 2022
AEK Athens	(Greece) Argiris Giannikis	Sacked	1 Μarch 2022	3rd	(Greece) Sokratis Ofrydopoulos (caretaker)	2 March 2022
Lamia	(Greece) Michalis Grigoriou	Sacked	2 March 2022	13th	(Italy) Gianluca Festa	3 March 2022

== Regular season ==
=== League table ===
Pos	Team	Pld	W	D	L	GF	GA	GD	Pts	Qualification
1	Olympiacos	26	20	5	1	47	14	+33	65	Qualification for the Play-off round
2	PAOK	26	16	5	5	50	24	+26	53	Qualification for the Play-off round
3	AEK Athens	26	14	4	8	42	28	+14	46	Qualification for the Play-off round
4	Aris	26	13	6	7	28	21	+7	45	Qualification for the Play-off round
5	Panathinaikos	26	13	3	10	41	21	+20	42	Qualification for the Play-off round
6	PAS Giannina	26	11	7	8	28	24	+4	40	Qualification for the Play-off round
7	OFI	26	9	10	7	33	32	+1	37	Qualification for the Play-out round
8	Asteras Tripolis	26	10	5	11	27	29	−2	35	Qualification for the Play-out round
9	Panetolikos	26	9	5	12	27	39	−12	32	Qualification for the Play-out round
10	Volos	26	8	6	12	35	42	−7	30	Qualification for the Play-out round
11	Ionikos	26	6	8	12	26	34	−8	26	Qualification for the Play-out round
12	Atromitos	26	6	5	15	27	47	−20	23	Qualification for the Play-out round
13	Lamia	26	4	6	16	19	37	−18	18	Qualification for the Play-out round
14	Apollon Smyrnis	26	2	7	17	9	47	−38	13	Qualification for the Play-out round

Source: Super League Greece
Rules for classification: 1) Points; 2) Head-to-head points; 3) Head-to-head goal difference; 4) Goal difference; 5) Goals scored; 6) Play-offs (neutral ground).
(Note: Criteria 6 is only used if needed to decide champion, teams for relegation or teams for UEFA competitions).

=== Results ===
Home \ Away	AEK	APS	ARIS	AST	ATR	ION	LAM	OFI	OLY	PAO	PNE	PAOK	PAS	VOL
AEK Athens	—	3–0	2–1	2–1	3–0	3–0	1–0	1–2	2–3	1–0	1–2	1–1	2–0	1–2
Apollon Smyrnis	2–2	—	0–0	0–1	0–2	0–0	0–0	0–3	0–0	0–3	0–0	0–2	1–0	1–3
Aris	2–1	0–0	—	1–0	3–0	1–0	0–0	0–0	2–1	1–0	5–1	0–0	0–5	0–2
Asteras Tripolis	0–0	1–0	0–2	—	6–2	2–3	0–1	1–0	0–2	2–1	1–0	0–1	2–0	1–0
Atromitos	0–2	4–1	1–3	2–0	—	0–2	3–1	2–2	0–3	0–2	1–2	2–0	1–1	2–1
Ionikos	0–1	4–0	1–0	1–1	2–1	—	1–2	0–0	0–3	0–1	1–2	3–2	0–0	1–1
Lamia	0–2	1–2	0–1	0–2	2–2	2–1	—	2–1	1–2	1–3	2–2	0–2	0–1	2–2
OFI	3–3	2–0	1–1	0–0	2–0	2–1	0–0	—	1–3	3–2	2–4	1–3	1–1	2–1
Olympiacos	1–0	4–1	1–0	5–1	0–0	1–0	1–0	2–0	—	0–0	3–1	2–1	2–0	2–1
Panathinaikos	3–0	4–0	2–0	0–1	2–0	4–1	2–0	0–0	0–0	—	2–0	1–3	2–0	5–1
Panetolikos	1–3	1–0	0–2	0–0	2–1	2–2	1–0	1–2	1–2	1–0	—	1–2	0–1	0–0
PAOK	2–0	4–1	0–1	3–2	1–0	1–1	2–1	3–0	1–1	2–1	2–0	—	0–1	4–4
PAS Giannina	1–2	2–0	2–0	1–1	1–1	1–0	1–0	1–1	1–2	1–0	3–0	0–4	—	3–2
Volos	1–3	1–0	1–2	2–1	3–0	1–1	2–1	0–2	0–1	3–1	1–2	0–4	0–0	—

Source: Super League Greece
Legend: Blue = home team win; Yellow = draw; Red = away team win.
For upcoming matches, an "a" indicates there is an article about the rivalry between the two participants.

== Play-off round ==
The top six teams from Regular season will meet twice (10 matches per team) for places in 2022–23 UEFA Champions League and 2022–23 UEFA Europa Conference League as well as deciding the league champion.

Pos	Team	Pld	W	D	L	GF	GA	GD	Pts	Qualification	OLY	PAOK	ARIS	PNA	AEK	PAS
1	Olympiacos (C)	36	25	8	3	62	26	+36	83	Qualification for the Champions League second qualifying round	—	1–1	2–1	1–2	1–1	3–2
2	PAOK	36	19	7	10	58	33	+25	64	Qualification for the Europa Conference League second qualifying round	1–2	—	0–1	2–0	1–1	1–0
3	Aris	36	18	8	10	39	28	+11	62	Qualification for the Europa Conference League second qualifying round	0–1	1–0	—	0–0	3–2	0–0
4	Panathinaikos	36	18	7	11	52	26	+26	61	Qualification for the Europa Conference League third qualifying round (Note: Panathinaikos qualified for the Europa Conference League third qualifying round by winning the Greek Cup.)	1–0	2–1	1–0	—	1–1	4–0
5	AEK Athens	36	16	8	12	56	42	+14	56		2–3	0–1	1–2	0–0	—	3–0
6	PAS Giannina	36	12	10	14	34	42	−8	46		1–1	1–0	0–3	0–0	2–3	—

Source: Super League Greece
Legend: Blue = home team win; Yellow = draw; Red = away team win.
Rules for classification: 1) Points; 2) Head-to-head points (Regular season and play-off); 3) Head-to-head goal difference (Regular season and play-off); 4) Regular season position.
(C) Champions

=== Play-off round positions by round ===
Team ╲ Round	26	27	28	29	30	31	32	33	34	35	36
Olympiacos	1	1	1	1	1	1	1	1	1	1	1
PAOK	2	2	2	2	2	2	2	2	2	2	2
Aris	4	4	4	5	3	3	4	4	4	4	3
Panathinaikos	5	5	5	4	4	4	3	3	3	3	4
AEK Athens	3	3	3	3	5	5	5	5	5	5	5
PAS Giannina	6	6	6	6	6	6	6	6	6	6	6

Champion and Champions League second qualifying round
Europa Conference League second qualifying round
Europa Conference League third qualifying round

Source: Super League Greece

== Play-out round ==
Pos	Team	Pld	W	D	L	GF	GA	GD	Pts	Qualification or relegation	ION	OFI	AST	VOL	PNE	ATR	LAM	APS
7	Ionikos	33	12	9	12	44	42	+2	45		—	—	—	2–2	3–1	—	—	5–1
8	OFI	33	11	11	11	40	45	−5	44		2–3	—	1–0	—	0–1	—	—	1–2
9	Asteras Tripolis	33	11	8	14	33	37	−4	41		2–3	—	—	—	—	0–0	0–2	2–2
10	Volos	33	10	10	13	47	48	−1	40		—	5–0	0–2	—	—	1–1	3–0	—
11	Panetolikos	33	10	7	16	32	48	−16	37		—	—	0–0	0–0	—	2–3	1–2	—
12	Atromitos	33	8	9	16	33	52	−19	33		0–1	1–1	—	—	—	—	—	1–0
13	Lamia (O)	33	6	8	19	24	44	−20	26	Qualification for the relegation play-offs	0–1	1–2	—	—	—	0–0	—	—
14	Apollon Smyrnis (R)	33	4	10	19	16	57	−41	22	Relegation to Super League 2	—	—	—	1–1	1–0	—	0–0	—

Source: Super League Greece
Legend: Blue = home team win; Yellow = draw; Red = away team win.
Rules for classification: 1) Points; 2) Head-to-head points (Regular season and play-out); 3) Head-to-head goal difference (Regular season and play-out); 4) Regular season position.
(O) Play-off winners; (R) Relegated

=== Play-out round positions by round ===
Team ╲ Round	26	27	28	29	30	31	32	33
Ionikos	11	11	11	10	9	9	8	7
OFI	7	8	7	7	7	7	7	8
Asteras Tripolis	8	7	8	8	8	8	9	9
Volos	10	10	10	9	10	11	11	10
Panetolikos	9	9	9	11	11	10	10	11
Atromitos	12	12	12	12	12	12	12	12
Lamia	13	13	13	13	13	13	13	13
Apollon Smyrnis	14	14	14	14	14	14	14	14

Qualification for the relegation play-offs
Relegation to 2022–23 Super League Greece 2

Source: Super League Greece

== Relegation play-offs ==
Summary
Team 1	Agg.	Team 2	1st leg	2nd leg
Veria	2–3	Lamia	1–2	1–1

11 June 2022
18:45 (EEST)
First leg

Veria	1–2	Lamia
Pasas 78'	Report	Bejarano 7'; Manousos 82'

Veria Stadium, Veria
Referee: Aliyar Aghayev (Azerbaijan)
18 June 2022
20:00 (EEST)
Second leg

Lamia	1–1	Veria
Bejarano 78'	Report	Giakoumakis 28'

Lamia Municipal Stadium, Lamia
Referee: Tamás Bognár (Hungary)

== Season statistics ==
=== Top scorers ===
As of 17 May 2022

Rank	Player	Club	Goals
1	(Netherlands) Tom van Weert	Volos	17
2	(Morocco) Youssef El-Arabi	Olympiacos	16
3	(Slovenia) Jasmin Kurtić	PAOK	15
4	(Greece) Efthymis Koulouris	Atromitos	14
5	(Argentina) Sergio Araujo	AEK Athens	12
6	(Argentina) Sebastian Palacios	Panathinaikos	11

=== Top assists ===
As of 17 May 2022

Rank	Player	Club	Assists
1	(Greece) Petros Mantalos	AEK Athens	11
1	(Syria) Aias Aosman	Ionikos	11
2	(Serbia) Andrija Živković	PAOK	6
3	(Spain) David Carmona	Asteras Tripolis	4
3	(Argentina) Federico Álvarez	Asteras Tripolis	4
3	(Greece) Georgios Masouras	Olympiacos	4
3	(Spain) Juan Muñiz	Atromitos	4

== Awards ==
=== Interwetten Player of the Month ===
Month	Player	Club	Ref
September	(Switzerland) Steven Zuber	AEK Athens	
October	(Sweden) Daniel Sundgren	Aris	
November	(Morocco) Youssef El-Arabi	Olympiacos	
December	(Senegal) Pape Abou Cissé	Olympiacos	
January	(Czech Republic) Tomáš Vaclík	Olympiacos	
February	(Argentina) Sebastián Palacios	Panathinaikos	
March	(Argentina) Sebastián Palacios	Panathinaikos	
April	(Brazil) Fabiano	Aris	
May	(Morocco) Youssef El-Arabi	Olympiacos	

=== Interwetten Player of the Club ===
Club	MVP	Ref
Olympiacos	(Morocco) Youssef El-Arabi	
PAOK	(Slovenia) Jasmin Kurtić	
Aris	(Argentina) Daniel Mancini	
Panathinaikos	(Argentina) Sebastián Palacios	
AEK Athens	(Argentina) Sergio Araujo	
PAS Giannina	(Colombia) Juan José Perea	
Ionikos	(Syria) Aias Aosman	
OFI	(Greece) Praxitelis Vouros	
Asteras Tripolis	(Cameroon) Kévin Soni	
Volos	(Netherlands) Tom van Weert	
Panetolikos	(Honduras) Deiby Flores	
Atromitos	(Greece) Efthymis Koulouris	
Lamia	(Costa Rica) Cristopher Núñez	
Apollon Smyrnis	(Greece) Antonis Dentakis	

=== Player of the Regular season ===
Player	Club	Votes	Ref
(Syria) Aias Aosman	Ionikos	18.14%	

=== Best Goal of the season ===
Player	Club	Votes	Match	Ref
(Argentina) Sergio Araujo	AEK Athens	vs Aris 1–1 (Matchday 21)	16.24%	

=== Interwetten Best Goal ===
Matchday	Player	Club	Ref
Regular Season
1st	(Switzerland) Steven Zuber	AEK Athens	
2nd	(Syria) Aias Aosman	Ionikos	
3rd	(Argentina) Sergio Araujo	AEK Athens	
4th	(Greece) Anastasios Chatzigiovanis	Panathinaikos	
5th	(Syria) Aias Aosman	Ionikos	
6th	(Spain) Carlitos	Panathinaikos	
7th	(Switzerland) Steven Zuber	AEK Athens	
8th	(Poland) Karol Świderski	PAOK	
9th	(Argentina) Sergio Araujo	AEK Athens	
10th	(Colombia) Juan José Perea	PAS Giannina	
11th	(Morocco) Nordin Amrabat	AEK Athens	
12th	(Portugal) Rony Lopes	Olympiacos	
13th	(Argentina) Sebastián Palacios	Panathinaikos	
14th	(Morocco) Youssef El-Arabi	Olympiacos	
15th	(Honduras) Deiby Flores	Panetolikos	
16th	(Trinidad and Tobago) Levi García	AEK Athens	
17th	(Paraguay) Juan Iturbe	Aris	
18th	(Argentina) Javier Mendoza	Panetolikos	
19th	(Spain) Aitor Cantalapiedra	Panathinaikos	
20th	(Spain) José Cañas	Ionikos	
21st	(Argentina) Sergio Araujo	AEK Athens	
22nd	(Argentina) Sergio Araujo	AEK Athens	
23rd	(Greece) Fotis Ioannidis	Panathinaikos	
24th	(Greece) Petros Mantalos	AEK Athens	
25th	(Brazil) Lucas Sasha	Aris	
26th	(Argentina) Sebastián Palacios	Panathinaikos	
Play-offs/Play-outs
1st/2nd	(Senegal) Badou Ndiaye	Aris	
3rd	(Spain) Juankar	Panathinaikos	
4th	(Greece) Lazaros Rota	AEK Athens	
5th	(Greece) Lazaros Rota	AEK Athens	
6th	(Portugal) Rony Lopes	Olympiacos	
7th/8th	(Mauritania) Aboubakar Kamara	Aris	
9th/10th	(Argentina) Lucas Villafáñez	Panathinaikos	

=== Annual awards ===
Annual awards were announced on 12 December 2022

Award	Winner	Club
Greek Player of the Season	(Greece) Georgios Masouras	Olympiacos
Foreign Player of the Season	(Argentina) Sebastián Palacios	Panathinaikos
Young Player of the Season	(Greece) Sotiris Alexandropoulos	Panathinaikos
Goalkeeper of the Season	(Russia) Yuri Lodygin	PAS Giannina
Fair Play of the Season	(Argentina) Sergio Araujo	AEK Athens
Golden Boot	(Netherlands) Tom van Weert	Volos
Manager of the Season	(Serbia) Ivan Jovanović	Panathinaikos

Team of the Season
Goalkeeper	(Russia) Yuri Lodygin (PAS Giannina)			
Defence	(Greece) Manolis Saliakas (PAS Giannina)	(Senegal) Pape Abou Cissé (Olympiacos)	(Greece) Giannis Kargas (PAS Giannina)	(Spain) Juankar (Panathinaikos)
Midfield	(Argentina) Sebastián Palacios (Panathinaikos)	(Slovenia) Jasmin Kurtić (PAOK)	(France) Yann M'Vila (Olympiacos)	(Greece) Georgios Masouras (Olympiacos)
Attack	(Netherlands) Tom van Weert (Volos)		(Argentina) Sergio Araujo (AEK Athens)	
