= Sergio Araujo =

Argentine footballer (born 1992)

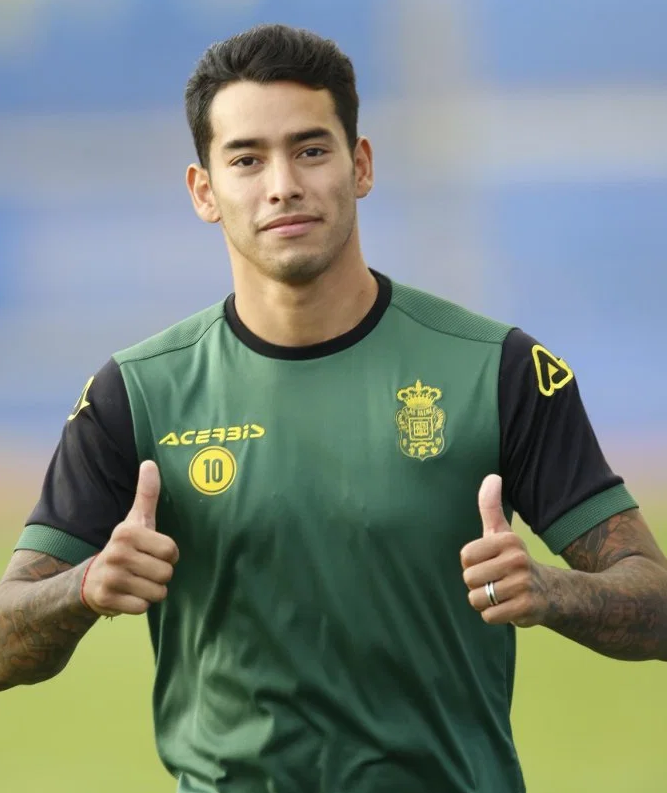
- Araujo with Las Palmas in 2019

Personal information
- Full name: Sergio Ezequiel Araujo
- Date of birth: 28 January 1992 (age 34)
- Place of birth: Buenos Aires, Argentina
- Height: 1.80 m (5 ft 11 in)
- Position: Forward

Team information
- Current team: Cerro Porteño
- Number: 21

Youth career
- –2009: Boca Juniors

Senior career*
Years	Team	Apps	(Gls)
2009–2015	Boca Juniors	22	(1)
2012–2013	→ Barcelona B (loan)	34	(7)
2013–2014	→ Tigre (loan)	23	(4)
2014–2015	→ Las Palmas (loan)	22	(7)
2015–2021	Las Palmas	132	(45)
2017	→ AEK Athens (loan)	15	(5)
2017–2018	→ AEK Athens (loan)	23	(11)
2020	→ AEK Athens (loan)	15	(3)
2021–2024	AEK Athens	81	(20)
2024	AEK Athens B	1	(1)
2024–	Cerro Porteño	28	(10)

International career^{‡}
2009–2010	Argentina U17	8	(6)
2011–2012	Argentina U20	10	(4)
2011–2012	Argentina U23	3	(1)
- * Club domestic league appearances and goals as of 21:30, 30 November 2025 (UTC) ‡ National team caps and goals as of 28 June 2015

Sergio Ezequiel Araujo (born 28 January 1992), nicknamed El Chino, is an Argentine professional footballer who plays as a forward for Paraguayan Primera División club Cerro Porteño.

== Club career ==
=== Boca Juniors ===
Born in Buenos Aires, Araujo graduated with Boca Juniors' youth setup. He played his first match as a professional on 13 December 2009, coming on as a late substitute for Nicolás Gaitán in a 0–2 home loss against Banfield for the Primera División championship.

Araujo scored his first professional goal on 21 November 2010, netting the first in a 2–1 home win against Arsenal de Sarandí. However, he was mainly used as a backup to Pablo Mouche and Lucas Viatri, appearing sparingly.

On 25 July 2012, Araujo moved abroad for the first time in his career, signing a two-year loan deal with Barcelona and being assigned to the reserves in Segunda División. He made his debut for the club on 17 August, playing the last 36 minutes of the 4–5 home loss against UD Almería.

Araujo scored his first goals for Barça B on 1 December, netting a brace in a 2–1 away win against Lugo. He finished the campaign with seven goals in 34 appearances, but returned to his parent club on 25 June 2013 nonetheless.

On 17 July 2013, Araujo was loaned to Tigre, after being deemed surplus to requirements by manager Carlos Bianchi. He appeared in 19 matches for the club, scoring four goals; he was sent off on 28 September in a 1–0 home win over Colón for an aggression against Maximiliano Caire.

=== Las Palmas ===
On 19 July 2014, Araujo returned to Spain, joining Las Palmas in a season-long loan deal. He made his debut for the Canarians on 23 August, starting and scoring the last in a 2–0 home win against UE Llagostera. Las Palmas came fourth and made the play-offs, in which Araujo opened a 1–1 draw at Real Valladolid in the first leg of the semi-finals; he missed a penalty in added time in the goalless second as his team advanced on the away goals rule. On 21 June 2015, in the final second leg against Real Zaragoza at the Estadio Gran Canaria, he scored an 84th-minute goal that made it 2–0 on the night, 3–3 on aggregate, thus sending Los Amarillos into La Liga via the same rule.

Araujo appeared in 43 matches and scored 25 goals over the season for the Canary Islands outfit, being the club's top goalscorer and the second overall. Despite strong links to a move to Celtic and Real Sociedad the club managed to buy him outright, with the player signing a five-year deal.

On 22 August 2015, Araujo made his La Liga debut, starting in a 0–1 away loss against Atlético Madrid. He scored his first goal in the category on 13 September, netting his team's first in a 3–3 draw at Celta de Vigo.

==== First loan to AEK Athens ====
On 24 January 2017, Araujo joined AEK Athens on loan until the end of the season with an option to extend for a further year. A week later, he scored twice in his debut, a 6–0 home win over Levadiakos for the Greek Cup. On 6 March 2017 he scored his first Super League Greece goal in a 1–1 away draw against rivals Panionios, and six days later he scored two of his team's three goals in the "double-headed eagle" derby against PAOK.

On 13 April 2017, he opened the score in a 2–1 away Greek Cup semifinals first leg win against champions Olympiacos. On 31 May, he scored the second goal of a 2–1 away win against Panionios and his team qualified for the UEFA Champions League. At the end of the season he returned to Las Palmas.

==== Second loan to AEK Athens ====
On 30 August 2017, Araujo returned to AEK on a season long-loan for a fee of €700,000. He scored nine goals at the domestic competitions during the second part of 2016–17 season. He combined his return with a goal in 4–0 home win against AEL. On 23 November 2017 he scored his first goal in UEFA competitions in a 2–2 home draw against Rijeka. On 14 January he scored a brace in a 3–1 home win against PAS Giannina. On 1 April 2018, Araujo's brace helped AEK to a 3–0 Athens derby win over Panathinaikos. On 5 May 2018, AEK celebrated their first title in 24 years after his goal secured a 1–0 away victory over Apollon Smyrnis at the Georgios Kamaras Stadium.

Las Palmas stated that Araujo would not be sold as his release clause was €60 million.

==== Third loan to AEK Athens ====
On 31 January 2020, AEK loaned Araujo from Las Palmas for the remainder of the season for a fee of €500,000. However, there is a reported clause in the deal which means that if AEK didn't decide to purchase Araujo on a permanent basis for €2.7 million after the campaign ends, they will have to pay a hefty compensation fee to Las Palmas. On 9 February 2020, Araujo scored his first goal since rejoining AEK, after eight minutes of a 1–0 win over city rivals Panathinaikos at the Olympic Stadium in the Super League Athenian derby.

=== AEK Athens ===
On 16 July 2021, Araujo signed a three-year deal with AEK, that cost AEK nearly €1.5 million, with 20% of the transfer going to Argentinian club Boca Juniors, which held a stake in the Argentine's resale. Araujo has played in 79 matches for the team, and scored 26 goals in all competitions, as a loanee in the previous years. On 22 September, he scored the only goal against Lamia. On 21 November 2021, he scored a brace but he did not avert a 3–2 home loss against rivals Olympiacos. On 6 February 2022, Araujo scored a brace, celebrating his 100th appearance with the club and named MVP in a 3–0 home win game against Apollon Smyrnis. Sergio Araujo was the captain of AEK Athens until he left at the end of the 2023–2024 season.

=== Cerro Porteño ===
On 13 September 2024, Araujo signed with Cerro Porteño in Paraguay. The club was allowed to sign him outside of transfer window on an emergency replacement clause, after Tobías Portillo suffered an injury with the Paraguay under-20 national team.

== International career ==
In 2009 Araujo represented Argentina at the South American U-17 Championship. He scored three goals in five appearances as side eventually finished second and qualified for the FIFA U-17 World Cup.

Araujo also appeared in 2009 FIFA U-17 World Cup held in Nigeria, scoring a 59th-minute winner against Honduras in Argentina's opening game, as well as a 58th-minute winner in a 2–1 victory against Germany in Argentina's second game. Argentina progressed to the round of 16, where he scored to put them 2–0 ahead of Colombia. However, Colombia would end up winning the game 3–2.

Araujo represented the Argentina U-23 national team at the 2011 Pan American Games in Guadalajara, Mexico. He scored in Argentina's opening 1–1 draw with Brazil, but was sent off in the 85th minute. Argentina reached the final, where they lost 1–0 against hosts Mexico.

== Career statistics ==
As of match played 19 March 2024

Appearances and goals by club, season and competition
Club	Season	League			National cup (Note: Includes Copa del Rey, Greek Football Cup)		Continental		Total	
Club	Season	Division	Apps	Goals	Apps	Goals	Apps	Goals	Apps	Goals
Boca Juniors	2009–10	Primera División	1	0	0	0	0	0	1	0
Boca Juniors	2010–11	Primera División	9	0	0	0	0	0	9	0
Boca Juniors	2011–12	Primera División	9	1	2	1	3	0	14	2
Boca Juniors	Total		19	1	2	1	3	0	24	2
Barcelona B (loan)	2012–13	Segunda División	34	7	0	0	–		34	7
Tigre (loan)	2013–14	Argentine Primera División	23	4	0	0	–		23	4
Las Palmas	2014–15	Segunda División	43	25	1	0	–		44	25
Las Palmas	2015–16	La Liga	30	5	1	0	–		31	5
Las Palmas	2016–17	La Liga	11	2	1	0	–		12	2
Las Palmas	2017–18	La Liga	2	0	0	0	–		2	0
Las Palmas	2018–19	Segunda División	26	4	0	0	–		26	4
Las Palmas	2019–20	Segunda División	4	0	2	0	–		6	0
Las Palmas	2020–21	Segunda División	29	11	0	0	–		29	11
Las Palmas	Total		145	47	5	0	–		150	47
AEK Athens (loan)	2016–17	Super League Greece	15	5	6	4	–		21	9
AEK Athens (loan)	2017–18	Super League Greece	23	11	8	2	8 (Note: Appearances in UEFA Europa League)	1	39	14
AEK Athens (loan)	2019–20	Super League Greece	15	3	4	0	–		19	3
AEK Athens	2021–22	Super League Greece	27	12	2	0	2 (Note: Appearances in UEFA Europa Conference League)	0	31	12
AEK Athens	2022–23	Super League Greece	29	7	5	0	–		34	7
AEK Athens	2023–24	Super League Greece	21	1	2	0	8 (Note: Four appearances and two goals in UEFA Champions League, four appearances in UEFA Europa League)	2	31	3
AEK total			130	39	27	6	18	3	175	48
AEK Athens B	2023–24	Super League Greece 2	1	1	–		–		1	1
Career total			352	101	34	7	21	3	407	109

== Honours ==
Cerro Porteño

- 2025 Clausura

Boca Juniors

- Primera División: 2011 Apertura

AEK Athens

- Super League Greece: 2017–18, 2022–23
- Greek Cup: 2022–23

Individual

- Segunda División Player of the Month: 2014 September
- AEK Athens Player of the Season: 2021–22
- Super League Greece Goal of the Season: 2021–22
- Super League Greece Team of the Season: 2021–22
- Super League Greece Fair Play of the Season: 2021–22
