= Westkapelle =

Westkapelle may refer to:

- Westkapelle, Belgium, a town in the municipality of Knokke-Heist in Belgium
- Westkapelle, Netherlands, a small city in the municipality of Veere in the Netherlands
