= Georgios Kornezos =

Greek footballer

Giorgos Kornezos
Personal information
- Full name: Georgios Kornezos
- Date of birth: 23 February 1998 (age 28)
- Place of birth: Athens, Greece
- Height: 1.91 m (6 ft 3 in)
- Position: Centre-back

Team information
- Current team: Levadiakos
- Number: 23

Youth career
- 2011–2015: Olympiacos

Senior career*
Years	Team	Apps	(Gls)
2015–2016	Asteras Vlachioti	26	(2)
2016–2017	Sparta	5	(0)
2017–2018	Ionikos	20	(1)
2018–2019	Ethnikos Piraeus	26	(0)
2019–2022	AEK Athens	1	(0)
2019–2020	→ Volos (loan)	0	(0)
2020	→ Ionikos (loan)	1	(0)
2020–2021	→ Asteras Vlachioti (loan)	17	(1)
2021–2022	AEK Athens B	26	(2)
2022–2025	Lamia	53	(1)
2025–2026	Baník Ostrava	7	(0)
2026–	Levadiakos	8	(0)
- * Club domestic league appearances and goals as of 20 September 2026

Georgios Kornezos (Greek: Γεώργιος Κορνέζος; born 23 February 1998) is a Greek professional footballer who plays as a centre-back for Super League club Levadiakos.

== Career ==
On 30 January 2025, Kornezos signed a contract with Czech First League club Baník Ostrava until 2026 with option.
