= Alexis Golfinos =

Greek footballer

Personal information
- Date of birth: 24 November 2004 (age 21)
- Place of birth: Patras, Greece
- Height: 1.81 m (5 ft 11 1/2 in)
- Position: Forward

Team information
- Current team: Athens Kallithea
- Number: 20

Youth career
- 2020–2021: AEK Athens

Senior career*
Years	Team	Apps	(Gls)
2021–2025	AEK Athens B	59	(5)
2025–	Athens Kallithea	17	(2)

International career^{‡}
2022	Greece U18	3	(0)
2022–2023	Greece U19	9	(0)
- * Club domestic league appearances and goals as of 21 April 2026 ‡ National team caps and goals as of 10 July 2023

Alexis Golfinos (Greek: Αλέξης Γκολφίνος; born 24 November 2004) is a Greek professional footballer who plays as a forward for Super League 2 club Athens Kallithea.
