= Belfius Basecamp =

Football training facility

- Interactive map of Belfius Basecamp
- Location: Herenweg 9, 8300 Knokke-Heist, Belgium
- Coordinates: 51°19′03″N 03°17′46″E
- Owner: Club Brugge KV
- Type: Training ground
- Surface: Hybrid

Construction
- Built: May 2018 - June 2019
- Opened: 14 September 2019

Tenants
- Club Brugge KV; Club NXT (U19-U23); Club YLA

Belfius Basecamp is a football training facility in Westkapelle, Belgium. It serves as the training ground of Club Brugge KV and also accommodates Club NXT (U19-U23) and Club YLA (once a week). It is also the operational headquarters of the club, housing around 120 employees.

Plans for a new 'base camp' for Club Brugge were announced in November 2016. Construction started in May 2018 and finished in June 2019. The club's president Bart Verhaeghe officially opened the facilities on 11 September 2019.

== Facilities ==
- 4 outdoor football pitches:
  - 3x 105x68 meters (hybrid grass)
  - 1x 105x68 meters (natural grass)
- 1 indoor football pitch: 105x68 meters (synthetic grass)
- 1 revalidation and swimming pool
- Spa facilities (Jacuzzi, sauna...)
- 1 gym with a fully equipped fitness centre
- 40 hotelrooms
- Medical area
- Auditorium for press conferences and tactical teammeetings
- Restaurant
- Offices and conference rooms
- Television studio
