= Sami Tlemcani =

French football player (born 2004)

Personal information
- Date of birth: 21 July 2004 (age 22)
- Place of birth: Saint-Maurice, France
- Height: 1.93 m (6 ft 4 in)
- Position: Goalkeeper

Team information
- Current team: MO Béjaïa
- Number: 94

Youth career
- Créteil-Lusitanos
- 2018–2020: Paris FC
- 2020–2022: Chelsea

Senior career*
Years	Team	Apps	(Gls)
2022–2023	Chelsea	0	(0)
2022	→ Merstham (loan)	5	(0)
2023–2025	AEK Athens B	10	(0)
2026-	MO Béjaïa	0	(0)

International career
2022	Morocco U20	1	(0)
- * Club domestic league appearances and goals as of 15 June 2025

Sami Tlemcani (Arabic: سامي التلمساني; born 21 July 2004) is a professional footballer who plays as a goalkeeper for Algerian League 2 club MO Béjaïa. Born in France, he represented Morocco at youth international level before committing to represent Algeria in February 2023.

== Club career ==
=== Early life ===
Born in Saint-Maurice, Val-de-Marne, France to an Algerian father and Moroccan mother, Tlemcani played for Créteil-Lusitanos before joining Paris FC. He spent two years with Paris FC, training with the first team at only 15 years old.

=== Chelsea ===
In October 2020, he joined English Premier League side Chelsea.

In February 2022, Tlemcani was loaned to Isthmian League side Merstham on a short-term deal. He went on to make five appearances in the league.

He extended his deal with Chelsea in August 2022, signing until 2025. On 1 July 2023, Tlemcani departed Chelsea by mutual consent.

=== AEK Athens ===
On 27 July 2023, Tlemcani joined Greek Super League 2 club AEK Athens B.

== International career ==
Tlemcani is eligible to represent France through birth, and both Algeria and Morocco through his parents. He was called up to the French under-16 team in November 2019.

Ahead of the 2021 Africa U-17 Cup of Nations, which was cancelled due to the COVID-19 pandemic in host country Morocco, Tlemcani pledged his international future to Morocco, stating on his Instagram page that he had decided to represent them instead of Algeria. This choice was strengthened further when, in September 2021, he received a surprise call up to the Morocco senior set up ahead of 2022 World Cup qualification games.

Despite Tlemcani initially expressing his pride at representing Morocco, his father said in an interview in September 2022 that he had a desire to represent Algeria at international level, but had yet to hear from the Algerian Football Federation. He has since gone on to represent Morocco at under-20 level.

In February 2023, Tlemcani chose to represent Algeria.

== Career statistics ==
=== Club ===
As of 9 December 2022.

Club	Season	League			National Cup		League Cup		Other		Total	
Club	Season	Division	Apps	Goals	Apps	Goals	Apps	Goals	Apps	Goals	Apps	Goals
Chelsea	2021–22	Premier League	0	0	0	0	0	0	0	0	0	0
Chelsea	2022–23	Premier League	0	0	0	0	0	0	0	0	0	0
Chelsea	Total		0	0	0	0	0	0	0	0	0	0
Merstham (loan)	2021–22	Isthmian League	5	0	0	0	–		0	0	5	0
Career total			5	0	0	0	0	0	0	0	5	0
