= Panagiotis Ginis =

Greek footballer

Personal information
- Date of birth: 23 January 1999 (age 27)
- Place of birth: Athens, Greece
- Height: 1.93 m (6 ft 4 in)
- Position: Goalkeeper

Team information
- Current team: Kalamata
- Number: 26

Youth career
- –2017: Apollon Smyrnis
- 2017–2018: AEK Athens

Senior career*
Years	Team	Apps	(Gls)
2018–2024	AEK Athens	0	(0)
2019–2020	→ Aspropyrgos (loan)	7	(0)
2020–2021	→ Ionikos (loan)	7	(0)
2021–2024	AEK Athens B	29	(0)
2024	Egnatia	0	(0)
2024–2025	PAS Giannina	5	(0)
2025–2026	Hellas Syros	27	(0)
2026–	Kalamata	0	(0)
- * Club domestic league appearances and goals as of 19 April 2026

Panagiotis Ginis (Greek: Παναγιώτης Γκίνης; born 23 January 1999) is a Greek professional footballer who plays as a goalkeeper for Super League club Kalamata.

== Honours ==
Ionikos

- Super League 2: 2020–21

AEK Athens

- Super League: 2022–23
- Greek Cup: 2022–23
