= Ilyas Lefrancq =

Moroccan footballer

Personal information
- Date of birth: 3 December 2003 (age 22)
- Height: 1.75 m (5 ft 9 in)
- Position: Midfielder

Youth career
- –2022: OH Leuven

Senior career*
Years	Team	Apps	(Gls)
2022	OH Leuven	1	(0)
2022–2023	KV Mechelen	0	(0)
2022–2023	Jong KV Mechelen	15	(7)
2023–2025	AEK Athens B	7	(0)
2025–2026	Patro Eisden Maasmechelen	13	(0)

International career^{‡}
2018	Belgium U16	1	(0)
2022	Morocco U20	6	(0)
- * Club domestic league appearances and goals as of 29 August 2026 ‡ National team caps and goals as of 24 October 2022

Ilyas Lefrancq (Arabic: إلياس ليفرانك; born 3 December 2003) is a professional footballer. Born in Belgium, he is a former youth international for Morocco.

== Club career ==
Lefrancq made his professional debut for OH Leuven on 3 April 2022 in the home match against Antwerp, when he was subbed on for Mathieu Maertens with ten minutes left on the clock.

On 17 June 2022, Lefrancq signed a two-year contract with Mechelen.

On 7 September 2023, he joined AEK Athens on a three-year deal.

On 13 August 2025, Lefrancq returned to Belgium and signed with Patro Eisden Maasmechelen.

== International career ==
Born in Belgium, Lefrancq is of Moroccan descent. He debuted with the Morocco U20s in a friendly 2–1 loss to the Spain U20s on 26 April 2022.
