= Sarantis Tselempakis =

Greek footballer (born 2005)

Personal information
- Date of birth: 2 November 2005 (age 21)
- Place of birth: Greece
- Height: 1.78 m (5 ft 10 in)
- Position: Midfielder

Team information
- Current team: Panthrakikos
- Number: 16

Youth career
- 2019–2021: Xanthi

Senior career*
Years	Team	Apps	(Gls)
2021–2022	Xanthi	8	(0)
2022–2024	Volos	2	(0)
2024–2025	AEK Athens B	1	(0)
2026–	Panthrakikos	0	(0)
- * Club domestic league appearances and goals as of 15 June 2024

Sarantis Tselempakis (Greek: Σαράντης Τσελεμπάκης; born 2 November 2005) is a Greek professional footballer who plays as a midfielder for Super League 2 club Panthrakikos.
