= Stefanos Katsikas =

Greek association football player (born 2002)

Personal information
- Date of birth: 28 February 2002 (age 24)
- Place of birth: Athens, Greece
- Height: 1.81 m (5 ft 11 1/2 in)
- Position: Right-back

Team information
- Current team: Volos
- Number: 28

Youth career
- 2016–2021: AEK Athens

Senior career*
Years	Team	Apps	(Gls)
2021–2025	AEK Athens B	60	(3)
2025–	Volos	9	(0)
2025–2026	→ Iraklis (loan)	21	(0)
- * Club domestic league appearances and goals as of September 20, 2026

Stefanos Katsikas (Greek: Στέφανος Κάτσικας; born 28 February 2002) is a Greek professional association football player who plays as a right-back for Super League club Volos.

== Career ==
In January 2025 he signed for Volos in Super League Greece.

== Career statistics ==
As of 1 April 2026

Club	Season	League			Cup		Continental		Other		Total	
Club	Season	Division	Apps	Goals	Apps	Goals	Apps	Goals	Apps	Goals	Apps	Goals
AEK Athens B	2021–22	Superleague Greece 2	5	0	—		—		—		5	0
AEK Athens B	2022–23	Superleague Greece 2	15	0	—		—		—		15	0
AEK Athens B	2023–24	Superleague Greece 2	26	2	—		—		—		26	2
AEK Athens B	2024–25	Superleague Greece 2	14	1	—		—		—		14	1
AEK Athens B	Total		60	3	—		—		—		60	3
Volos	2024–25	Superleague Greece	8	0	0	0	—		—		8	0
Iraklis (loan)	2025–26	Superleague Greece 2	21	0	3	0	—		—		24	0
Career total			89	3	3	0	0	0	0	0	92	3
