= Kostas Bratsos =

Greek manager

Personal information
- Full name: Konstantinos Bratsos
- Date of birth: 26 April 1977 (age 49)
- Place of birth: Volos, Greece

Team information
- Current team: Volos (manager)

Managerial career
- Years: Team
- 2016–2017: Olympiacos Volos (assistant)
- 2017: Olympiacos Volos
- 2020–2021: Volos (assistant)
- 2021: Volos (caretaker)
- 2021: Volos (assistant)
- 2021–2022: Volos (caretaker)
- 2022: Volos (assistant)
- 2022–2023: Volos
- 2024: A.E. Kifisia
- 2024: AC Oulu
- 2024–2025: Volos
- 2025: Athens Kallithea
- 2026–: Volos

Konstantinos Bratsos (Greek: Κώστας Μπράτσος; born 26 April 1977) is a Greek professional football manager and former player. He is the current manager of Super League club Volos.

== Managerial career ==
Konstantinos Bratsos successfully graduated from the UEFA PRO Coaching School. His first coaching experience was with the Aisonia Academy, followed by the Agia Paraskevi Academy in Volos. In 2009, he led the senior team of Agia Paraskevi to the First Division of the EPS Thessaly Championship and remained there until 2010, with the team playing a leading role. He returned to Agia Paraskevi in October 2018 in an upgraded role as Technical Director of the Academies, serving until June 2020.

Between 2010 and 2018, he coached several historic teams of the Magnesia region: AE Diminiou, Sarakinos, Dimitra of Exinoupolis, and after a stint with the B team (U20) of Niki Volos, he returned to AE Diminiou in 2015.

In 2016, he made a significant step forward in his coaching career by joining Olympiacos Volos, initially as Assistant Coach and later as Head Coach in the Gamma Ethniki (Third Division), where he reunited with his former player at Sarakinos, Jonathan Vaitsi, who was then Technical Director. He remained in this role until the end of 2017, recording 5 wins, 6 draws, and 3 losses.

From August 2020 until November 2023, he was an integral part of the coaching staff of Volos NFC, serving both as Assistant and Head Coach under the presidency of the Mayor of Volos, Achilleas Beos, and with Technical Director Akis Petrou. Bratsos was also the direct assistant of Spanish coach Angel Lopez, with specific responsibilities in opponent analysis and set-piece preparation, contributing to the team’s successful run in the Greek Super League.

On 30 January 2024, Bratsos was officially announced as the new Head Coach of A.E. Kifisia. He remained at Kifisia until 31 May 2024, recording 4 wins, 4 draws, and 4 losses.

On 19 June 2024, Bratsos was officially appointed as Head Coach of Finnish side AC Oulu, staying with the club until September 2, 2024. His record with AC Oulu was 5 wins and 7 losses. He is the first Greek coach in the history of Finnish football and notably achieved a historic home victory against the eventual league champions KuPS, with a 1–0 scoreline.

On 13 November 2024, he returned to Volos NFC and remained until February 23, 2025, with a record of 4 wins, 2 draws, and 8 losses, including two impressive away victories in Thessaloniki against Aris (0–1) and PAOK (1–2).

On 25 June 2025 Bratsos was officially announced as the new Head Coach of Athens Kallithea

On 14 October 2025, Bratsos left Athens Kallithea by mutual consent, having been in charge for eight matches in all competitions.

On 10 February 2026, he was appointed head coach of Volos for the third time, replacing Juan Ferrando. On 22 March 2026, on the final matchday of the regular season, Volos came from behind to beat PAOK 2–1 with a stoppage-time winner in the fifth minute of added time, a result that secured the club's participation in the Super League Greece play-offs for places 5–8 and kept it in contention for a European ticket.

On 4 June 2026, Volos announced that Bratsos would remain in charge for the 2026–27 season, with a restructured technical staff.
