= Sokratis Ofrydopoulos =

Greek manager and former footballer

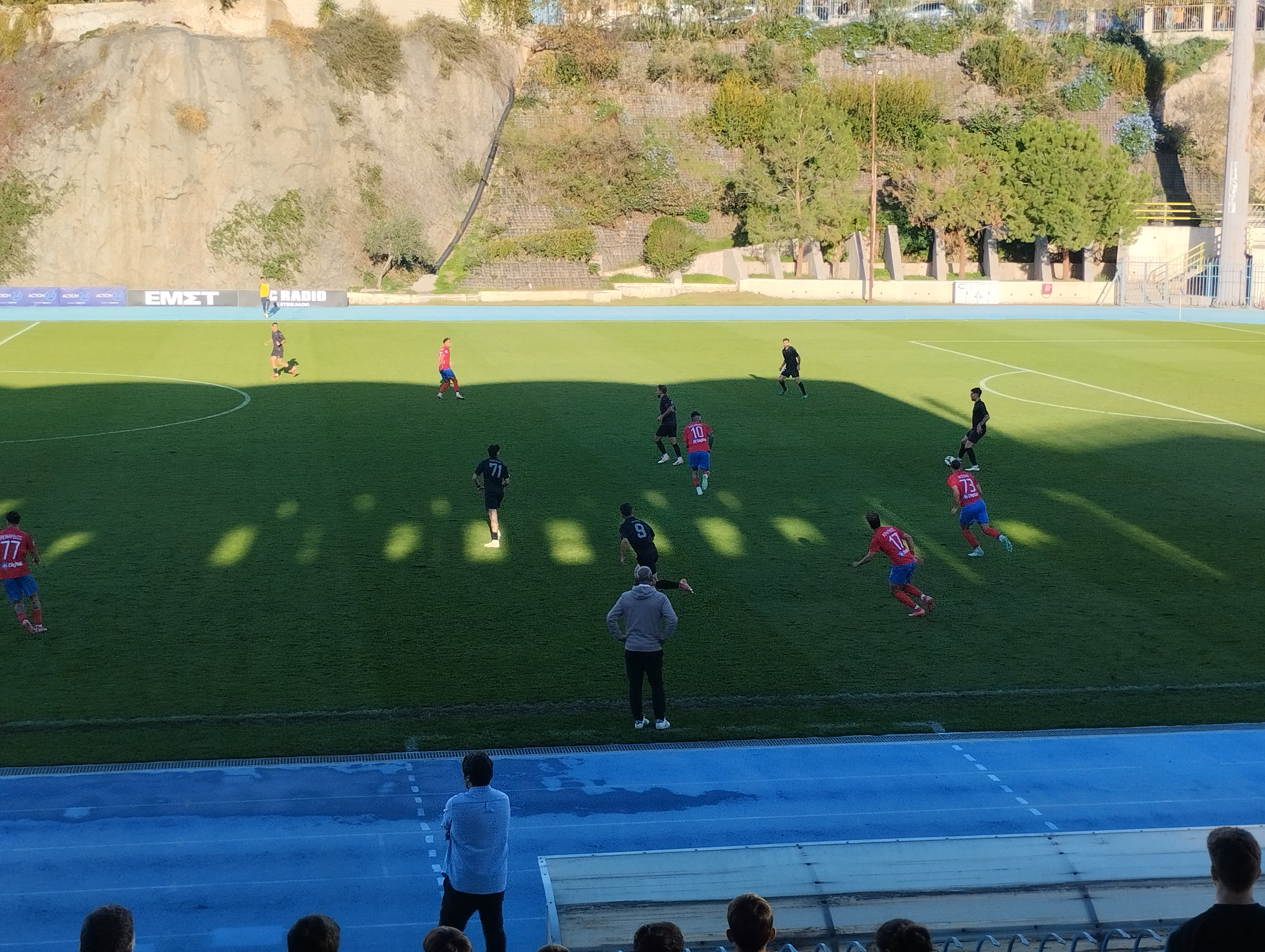
- Ofrydopoulos managing Athens Kallithea in 2025.

Personal information
- Date of birth: 26 October 1973 (age 53)
- Place of birth: Athens, Greece
- Height: 1.90 m (6 ft 3 in)
- Position: Defender

Team information
- Current team: AEL (manager)

Senior career*
| Years | Team | Apps | (Gls) |
| 1991–1996 | Kallithea | 119 | (9) |
| 1996–2000 | Ionikos | 80 | (4) |
| 2000 | PAS Giannina | 4 | (0) |
| 2001–2007 | Ionikos | 83 | (5) |
| 2007–2008 | Asteras Tripolis | 22 | (1) |

International career
| | Greece U21 | 1 | (0) |

Managerial career
- 2014: Alimos
- 2015: Lamia (assistant)
- 2015–2016: Atromitos (youth)
- 2016–2019: Panachaiki
- 2019: Doxa Drama
- 2019–2020: Atromitos (youth)
- 2020: Panachaiki
- 2021: Levadiakos (interim)
- 2021–2023: AEK Athens B
- 2022: AEK Athens (interim)
- 2023–2024: Levadiakos
- 2024: Iraklis
- 2024–2025: Chania
- 2025–2026: Athens Kallithea
- 2026–: AEL
- * Club domestic league appearances and goals

Sokratis Ofrydopoulos (Greek: Σωκράτης Οφρυδόπουλος; born 26 October 1973) is a Greek professional football manager and former player. He is the current manager of Super League 2 club AEL.

== Personal life ==
Ofrydopoulos is of Pontic origin from his father's side. Also, his father who was born in Kavala, played in Greek Second Division with the local club A.E. Kavalas. His mother was born in Patra.
