= Lefteris Tasiouras =

Greek footballer

Personal information
- Full name: Eleftherios Tasiouras
- Date of birth: 1 March 2004 (age 22)
- Place of birth: Thessaloniki, Greece
- Height: 1.74 m (5 ft 9 in)
- Position: Right-back

Team information
- Current team: Volos
- Number: 72

Youth career
- 2013–2022: PAOK

Senior career*
Years	Team	Apps	(Gls)
2022–2025	PAOK B	40	(0)
2025–	Volos	13	(0)

International career^{‡}
2022	Greece U18	2	(0)
2021–2023	Greece U19	7	(0)
2024	Greece U21	1	(0)
- * Club domestic league appearances and goals as of 22 March 2026 ‡ National team caps and goals as of 11 October 2024

Lefteris Tasiouras (Greek: Λευτέρης Τασιούρας; born 1 March 2004) is a Greek professional footballer who plays as a right-back for Super League club Volos.

== Career ==
In January 2025 he signed for Volos in Super League Greece.
