= Alexandros Parras =

Greek footballer

Personal information
- Date of birth: 12 May 1998 (age 28)
- Place of birth: Ioannina, Greece
- Height: 1.82 m (6 ft 0 in)
- Position: Left-back

Team information
- Current team: AEL
- Number: 28

Youth career
- 2014–2017: Panetolikos

Senior career*
Years	Team	Apps	(Gls)
2017–2021	Panetolikos	8	(0)
2021–2025	AEK Athens	0	(0)
2021–2025	AEK Athens B	64	(3)
2023–2024	→ A.E. Kifisia (loan)	11	(0)
2025	→ Domžale (loan)	11	(0)
2026–	AEL	1	(0)

International career
2017	Greece U21	1	(0)
- * Club domestic league appearances and goals as of 12 September 2026

Alexandros Parras (Greek: Αλέξανδρος Παρράς; born 12 May 1998) is a Greek professional footballer who plays as a left-back for Super League 2 club AEL.

== Career ==
=== Panetolikos ===
Parras began his career with the youth club of Panetolikos. He signed his first professional contract in August 2017.

He made his Superleague debut on 21 October 2017 in a match against Kerkyra.

=== AEK Athens ===
On 7 June 2021, AEK Athens officially announced the signing of Parras on a five-year deal.

On 27 July 2023, Parras joined A.E. Kifisia on a season-long loan.

== Career statistics ==
As of 22 June 2024

Club	Season	League			National Cup		Continental		Other		Total	
Club	Season	Division	Apps	Goals	Apps	Goals	Apps	Goals	Apps	Goals	Apps	Goals
Panetolikos	2017–18	Super League Greece	1	0	2	0	—		—		3	0
Panetolikos	2018–19	Super League Greece	3	0	0	0	—		—		3	0
Panetolikos	2019–20	Super League Greece	4	0	2	0	—		—		6	0
Panetolikos	Total		8	0	4	0	—		—		12	0
AEK Athens B	2021–22	Super League Greece 2	25	1	—		—		—		25	1
AEK Athens B	2022–23	Super League Greece 2	22	1	—		—		—		22	1
AEK Athens B	Total		47	2	—		—		—		47	2
A.E. Kifisia (loan)	2023–24	Super League Greece	11	0	3	0	—		—		14	0
Career total			66	2	7	0	0	0	0	0	73	2
