= Christos Lisgaras =

Greek footballer

Personal information
- Date of birth: 12 February 1986 (age 40)
- Place of birth: Ioannina, Greece
- Height: 1.89 m (6 ft 2 1/2 in)
- Position: Centre-back

Youth career
- –2004: Olympiacos

Senior career*
Years	Team	Apps	(Gls)
2004–2005	Olympiacos	0	(0)
2005–2009	Panachaiki	83	(0)
2009–2010	Vyzas Megara	31	(3)
2010–2013	Levadiakos	49	(6)
2013–2014	Asteras Tripolis	3	(0)
2014–2020	Xanthi	136	(10)
2020–2022	Apollon Smyrnis	43	(0)
2022–2023	Makedonikos	24	(0)
2023–2025	Anagennisi Artas	17	(5)

International career
2005	Greece U19	5	(0)
- * Club domestic league appearances and goals as of 13 June 2023

Christos Lisgaras (Greek: Χρήστος Λισγάρας; born 12 February 1986) is a former Greek professional footballer who played as a centre-back .

== Career ==
He started his career at the youth teams of Olympiacos. In 2005, he signed for Panachaiki, where he stayed for 4 years. In 2009, he moved to Vyzas Megaron and he joined current club Levadiakos in 2010. He stayed for three years and in the summer of 2013, he signed a year contract with Asteras Tripolis. Since 2014, he played for Xanthi.
