= Antonis Dentakis =

Greek footballer

Personal information
- Full name: Antonios Andreas Dentakis
- Date of birth: 13 March 1995 (age 31)
- Place of birth: Chania, Crete, Greece
- Height: 1.79 m (5 ft 10 in)
- Position: Right-back

Team information
- Current team: Athens Kallithea
- Number: 33

Youth career
- 2011–2013: Kissamikos

Senior career*
Years	Team	Apps	(Gls)
2013–2015	Platanias	2	(0)
2015	→ Kissamikos (loan)	12	(0)
2015–2017	AEEK SYN.KA	50	(2)
2017–2021	Volos	71	(2)
2021–2022	Apollon Smyrnis	27	(0)
2022–2024	Levadiakos	23	(0)
2024–2025	Lamia	18	(0)
2025–	Athens Kallithea	22	(1)
- * Club domestic league appearances and goals as of 21 April 2026

Antonis Dentakis (Greek: Αντώνης Ντεντάκης; born 13 March 1995) is a Greek professional footballer who plays as a right-back for Super League 2 club Athens Kallithea.

== Honours ==
Volos

- Gamma Ethniki: 2017–18
- Football League: 2018–19
