= Javier Mendoza (footballer) =

Argentine footballer

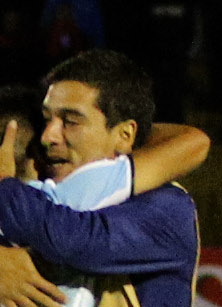

Personal information
- Full name: Javier Osvaldo Mendoza
- Date of birth: 2 September 1992 (age 34)
- Place of birth: Tartagal, Argentina
- Height: 1.71 m (5 ft 7 in)
- Position: Winger

Team information
- Current team: Marko
- Number: 33

Senior career*
Years	Team	Apps	(Gls)
2013–2017	Gimnasia y Esgrima	61	(3)
2016–2017	→ Atlético Tucumán (loan)	11	(0)
2017–2018	Chacarita Juniors	7	(1)
2018–2019	Instituto	23	(2)
2019–2020	Huracán	9	(0)
2020–2022	Panetolikos	50	(5)
2022	Ionikos	10	(2)
2023–2024	AEL Limassol	36	(2)
2024–2025	A.E. Kifisia	0	(0)
2025–	Marko	19	(2)
- * Club domestic league appearances and goals as of 01:33, 13 September 2026 (UTC)

Javier Osvaldo Mendoza (born 2 September 1992) is an Argentine professional footballer who plays as a winger for Greek Super League 2 club Marko.

== Career ==
Mendoza started his career in 2013 with Gimnasia y Esgrima of Primera B Nacional, appearing on the bench five times during 2012–13. His debut came in the Copa Argentina, in a defeat against Excursionistas. His first league appearance came during the 2013–14 Primera División season, after Gimnasia's promotion, in a loss to Racing. Sixty-nine appearances and four goals followed throughout the next four seasons with Gimnasia. Ahead of 2016–17, Mendoza joined fellow top-flight side Atlético Tucumán on loan. On 28 August 2016, Mendoza made his Atlético Tucumán debut against Atlético de Rafaela in a 1–0 win.

A year later, Mendoza joined newly promoted Chacarita Juniors. He made his debut on 10 September versus Tigre, before scoring his first Chacarita goal on 17 September against his former club Atlético Tucumán. Mendoza terminated his contract with Chacarita on 9 January 2018, prior to signing for Instituto a day later. His 100th career appearance came against Sarmiento on 6 May. Huracán of the Primera División signed Mendoza in January 2019.

On 3 August 2020, Mendoza joined Super League Greece club Panetolikos F.C. on a two years' contract for an undisclosed fee.

== Career statistics ==
As of 19 February 2022.

Club statistics
Club	Season	League			Cup		Continental		Other		Total	
Club	Season	Division	Apps	Goals	Apps	Goals	Apps	Goals	Apps	Goals	Apps	Goals
Gimnasia y Esgrima	2012–13	Primera B Nacional	0	0	1	0	—		0	0	1	0
Gimnasia y Esgrima	2013–14	Argentine Primera División	21	0	0	0	—		0	0	21	0
Gimnasia y Esgrima	2014	Argentine Primera División	19	1	0	0	2 (Note: Appearance(s) in Copa Sudamericana)	0	0	0	21	1
Gimnasia y Esgrima	2015	Argentine Primera División	17	2	2	0	—		3 (Note: Appearance(s) in Argentine Primera División play-offs)	1	22	3
Gimnasia y Esgrima	2016	Argentine Primera División	4	0	0	0	—		0	0	4	0
Gimnasia y Esgrima	2016–17	Argentine Primera División	0	0	0	0	0	0	0	0	0	0
Gimnasia y Esgrima	Total		61	3	3	0	2	0	3	1	69	4
Atlético Tucumán (loan)	2016–17	Argentine Primera División	11	0	0	0	1 (Note: Appearance(s) in Copa Libertadores)	0	0	0	12	0
Chacarita Juniors	2017–18	Argentine Primera División	7	1	0	0	—		0	0	7	1
Instituto	2017–18	Primera B Nacional	11	2	0	0	—		1 (Note: Appearance in Primera B Nacional play-offs)	0	12	2
Instituto	2018–19	Primera B Nacional	12	0	0	0	—		0	0	12	0
Instituto	Total		23	2	0	0	—		0	0	23	2
Huracán	2018–19	Argentine Primera División	6	0	1	0	3	0	0	0	10	0
Huracán	2019–20	Argentine Primera División	3	0	0	0	1	0	1 (Note: Appearance in Torneos de Verano)	0	5	0
Huracán	Total		9	0	1	0	4	0	1	0	15	0
Panetolikos	2020–21	Super League Greece	23	1	2	0	–		–		25	1
Panetolikos	2020–21	Super League Greece	20	4	3	1	–		–		23	5
Panetolikos	Total		43	5	5	1	–		–		48	6
Career total			154	11	9	1	7	0	5	1	175	13
