= Konstantinos Roukounakis =

Greek footballer

Personal information
- Date of birth: 17 July 2001 (age 25)
- Place of birth: Athens, Greece
- Height: 1.83 m (6 ft 0 in)
- Position: Midfielder

Team information
- Current team: A.E. Kifisia
- Number: 17

Youth career
- 2012–2015: Olympiacos
- 2015–2019: Panionios
- 2019: Apollon Smyrnis
- 2019–2021: AEK Athens

Senior career*
Years	Team	Apps	(Gls)
2021–2025	AEK Athens	0	(0)
2021–2025	AEK Athens B	63	(1)
2025	→ A.E. Kifisia (loan)	1	(0)
2025–	A.E. Kifisia	27	(1)
- * Club domestic league appearances and goals as of 18 November 2026

Konstantinos Roukounakis (Greek: Κωνσταντίνος Ρουκουνάκης; born 17 July 2001) is a Greek professional footballer who plays as a midfielder for Super League club A.E. Kifisia.

== Career ==
In January 2025 he signed for A.E. Kifisia as a loan from AEK Athens B.
