= Westkapelle, Belgium =

Westkapelle
- Deelgemeente
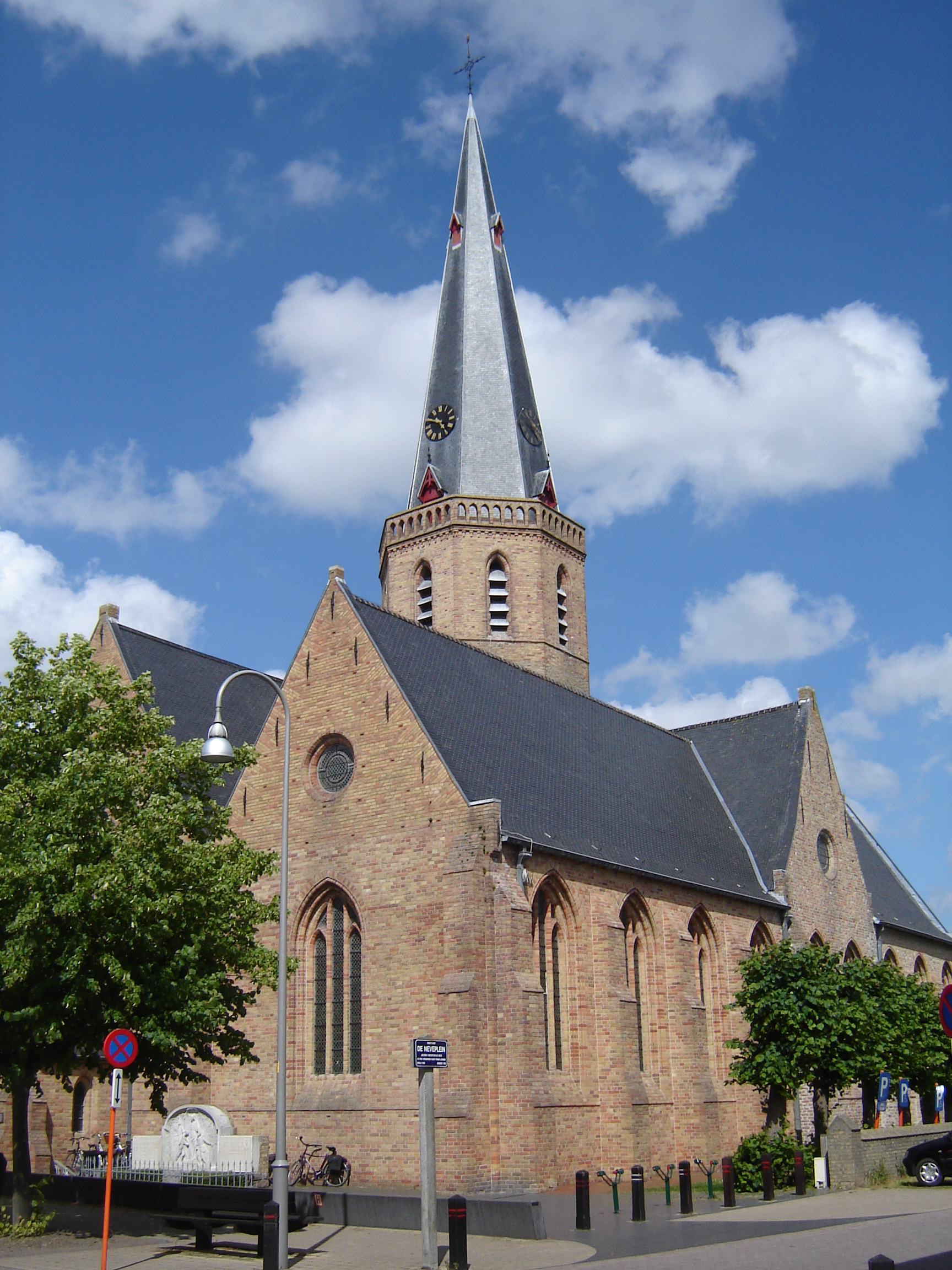
- Sint-Niklaas church (Westkapelle

- Coordinates: 51°18′53″N 3°18′10″E
- Country: Belgium
- Province: West Flanders
- Municipality: Knokke-Heist

Area
  - Total: 21.46 km^{2} (8.29 sq mi)

Population (2006)
  - Total: 4,797
- Source: NIS
- Postal code: 8300

Westkapelle is a town in Knokke-Heist, a part of Belgium. In 2013, a fire destroyed the old Sint-Niklaas church (Westkapelle).
