= AEK Athens B F.C. =

Men's association football team in Greece

AEK Athens B
- Full name: AEK Athens "B" Football Club
- Founded: 2021; 5 years ago
- Dissolved: 2025; 1 year ago
- Ground: Spata Training Centre
- Capacity: 3,000

A.E.K. Athens B Football Club (Greek: ΠΑΕ AEK B [aek]; Αθλητική Ένωσις Κωνσταντινουπόλεως; Athlitikí Énosis Konstadinoupόleos, meaning Athletic Union of Constantinople) was a Greek professional football club based in Nea Filadelfeia, a suburb of Athens, Greece.

Founded in 2021, it was the reserve team of AEK Athens, and last played in Super League Greece 2, holding its home matches at the Spata Training Centre.

Reserve teams in Greece play in the same league system as the senior team, rather than in a reserve team league. They must play at least one level below their main side, and thus AEK Athens B are ineligible for promotion to Super League Greece. They also cannot play in the Greek Cup.

== History ==
Founded in 2021, AEK Athens B Football Club became AEK Athens' reserve team and began to play home games at Spata Training Centre. They were dissolved in 2025 after being relegated from Super League Greece 2.

== Stadium ==
The Spata Training Centre, was built in 2010, it is located in the suburban Athens area of Spata and ever since then it is the home ground for all of the football club's departments.

== Players ==
=== Current squad ===
As of 30 July 2025

Note: Flags indicate national team as defined under FIFA eligibility rules; some limited exceptions apply. Players may hold more than one non-FIFA nationality.

No.	Pos.	Nation	Player
31	FW	GRE	Antonis Georgeas
32	FW	ARG	Elián Sosa
34	DF	GRE	Christos Kosidis
36	MF	GRE	Pavlos Mavroudis
38	DF	ALB	Ermis Selimaj
41	GK	GRE	Marios Balamotis
42	DF	FRA	Lenny Manisa
43	FW	GRE	Alexis Golfinos
44	FW	CMR	Donaldoni Zambou Nguemechieu
47	DF	GRE	Nikos Kanellopoulos
49	DF	GRE	Vasilios Pavlidis
50	MF	MAR	Ilyas Lefrancq
54	FW	GRE	Aris Andrikopoulos
60	DF	AUS	Dimitri Valkanis
61	GK	GRE	Panormitis Kalliaros
63	DF	GRE	Nikolaos Baxevanos

No.	Pos.	Nation	Player
65	DF	GRE	Georgios Pavlakis
71	MF	GRE	Sarantis Tselebakis
72	MF	GRE	Athanasios Papadakos
73	MF	GRE	Christoforos Kolimatsis
75	DF	GRE	Christos Giannoulis
77	MF	GRE	Konstantinos Bekos
79	FW	GRE	Lampros Moustakas
84	DF	GRE	Konstantinos Antonopoulos
86	MF	GRE	Georgios Konstantakopoulos (on loan from A.E. Kifisia)
87	FW	GRE	Vasilios Kontonikos
88	MF	GRE	Markos Nino
89	FW	GRE	Georgios Nalitzis
92	FW	GRE	Apostolos Christopoulos (on loan from A.E. Kifisia)
94	GK	ALG	Sami Tlemcani
96	DF	GRE	Alexandros Parras

=== Out on loan ===
Note: Flags indicate national team as defined under FIFA eligibility rules; some limited exceptions apply. Players may hold more than one non-FIFA nationality.

No.	Pos.	Nation	Player
—	MF	CIV	Hamed Kader Fofana (at Iraklis until 30 June 2026)
—	DF	GRE	Alexandros Pilios (at Asteras Kesarianis until 30 June 2025)
—	MF	GRE	Konstantinos Roukounakis (at A.E. Kifisia until 30 June 2025)

No.	Pos.	Nation	Player
—	FW	GRE	Theodosis Macheras (at Vitesse until 30 June 2025)
—	FW	GRE	Anastasios Kontorouchas (at Krka until 30 June 2025)

== See also ==
- AEK Athens F.C.
- AEK Athens F.C. Academy
