= 2022–23 AEK Athens F.C. season =

AEK Athens
2022–23 season
- Chairman: Evangelos Aslanidis
- Manager: Matías Almeyda
- Stadium: Agia Sophia Stadium
- Super League: 1st (After play-offs); 2nd (Regular season)
- Greek Cup: Winners
- Top goalscorer: League: Levi García (14); All: Levi García (18)
- Highest home attendance: 31,100 (vs Ionikos) (30 September 2022) (vs PAOK) (30 October 2022) (vs Panathinaikos) (8 January 2023) (vs Olympiacos) (12 March 2023) (vs Olympiacos) (3 May 2023) (vs Volos) (14 May 2023)
- Lowest home attendance: 12,526* (vs Volos) (27 August 2022); *The match was held at Georgios Kamaras Stadium.
- Average home league attendance: 27,545
- Biggest win: Volos 0–4 AEK Athens; AEK Athens 4–0 PAOK; AEK Athens 4–0 Volos
- Biggest defeat: AEK Athens 1–3 Olympiacos; PAOK 2–0 AEK Athens
Home colours	Away colours	Third colours

The 2022–23 season was the 99th season in the existence of AEK Athens F.C. and the 62nd competitive season and eighth consecutive in the top flight of Greek football. They competed in the Super League and the Greek Cup. The season began on 20 August 2022 and finished on 24 May 2023.

== Kits ==
Supplier: Nike
Sponsor(s): Pame stoixima
Features: Car.gr, LG Corp

Home	Away	Third

== Overview ==
The end of the previous season found AEK at the worst point of their downward spiral in 5 years. The team had been far from winning a title and even failed to participate in any of the European competitions. In the midst of this heavy situation, the former international star, Matías Almeyda was hired as their new manager. "El Pelado", as was his nickname, had experience at the top level as a footballer and successful spells in Argentina and Mexico as a manager. The Argentine had great appetite for work and ambitions for conquering titles in his coaching debut in Europe. Having reached an agreement since the end of the previous season, he had the comfort of time and the ability to plan his team from the beginning without distractions. The management, having learned from the previous season's mistakes, showed a different mentality to the staffing of the club, both at competitive and at administrative level. Almeyda was given full charge of the team, while his non-negotiable request to be supported by his entire personal staff was also satisfied. In the summer transfer window, AEK moved dynamically and signed a series of international footballers, such as the Croatian defender Domagoj Vida, the Cameroonian defender Harold Moukoudi, the Danish midfielder Jens Jønsson, the Serbian midfielder Mijat Gaćinović, while the transfer of Steven Zuber became permanent. Other transfers that stood out as well, were those of the French former world champion, Djibril Sidibé, Niclas Eliasson, the last season's top scorer, Tom van Weert and most importantly, the loan of the Mexican international midfielder, Orbelín Pineda, a personal choice of the manager. At the same time, several players, with little to no contribution left the club with the exception of vice-captain, André Simões who after 7 years of service returned to his homeland. Furthermore, despite the huge anticipation of the fans for the upcoming opening of the Agia Sophia Stadium, a new state-of-the-art stadium, the opening was pushed back so that some final work could be completed. This delay forced AEK to play their first two home games at Georgios Kamaras Stadium since the management decided to leave the Olympic Stadium.

From early in the season AEK began to show signs of the team that Almeyda was preparing. Game by game, the team presented more and more of their style of play on the pitch that the Argentine manager was asking for. A game of dominance on the pitch, with suffocating pressure on the opposition all over the pitch and immediate possession recoveries whenever the ball was lost, with the team imposing themselves at every opponent regardless of their capacity and capabilities. A style that seemed foreign in Greek football which caught their opponents by surprise, forcing them to adjust their tactics and play in order to cope with the pressure of AEK.

On 30 September, in an emotionally charged opening ceremony, Agia Sophia Stadium opened its gates for the first time. At last AEK Athens found their home after 19 years, after the demolition of Nikos Goumas Stadium. Three days later, in the historic first match against Ionikos, AEK achieved an imposing 4–1 amidst cheers and celebrations by both crowd and club. Gacinovic opened the score for the first time in the new stadium in only six minutes in the game.

The performance of AEK improved as the season progressed, but they remained in second place in the standings, behind Panathinaikos. The image of the two teams gave the impression that their point difference was both fictitious and reversible. The difference peaked at 8 points, when all top-tier championships were interrupted, due to the 2022 FIFA World Cup.

With the resumption of the league, AEK went until the end of the regular season achieving only victories with the exception of three defeats. On 5 February, AEK became unwittingly involved in case that defamed Greek football. At Peristeri Stadium, just before the match against Atromitos, the players of AEK noticed a height difference in the horizontal beams of the two goals and informed the referee who confirmed the violation and as the rule dictated gave time to the home team to fix the problem. The attempts by the officials of Atromitos to dig the goal line to restore the height were of no success The inability to resolve the problem led to the departure of the referee and the teams. The case naturally went to courts, the disciplinary body of the Super League despite the rule, set a replay of the match, absolving the host Atromitos of any responsibility. Despite all that, AEK won the match and in the end went into the play-off round having reduced the points gap from Panathinaikos to just 2 points.

In the play-offs, the yellow-blacks continued their imposing performance against their opponents. With a summary of 7 wins, 3 goalless draws and the goal difference at 18–3, testified to their absolute dominance. Those performances included the 0–1 and 1–3 victories away from home against PAOK and Olympiacos respectively and an imposing 4–0 home win against the former. The title was eventually judged in the penultimate matchday, where AEK defeated Aris at Kleanthis Vikelidis Stadium, while at the same time Panathnaikos were defeated by Olympiacos at Karaiskakis Stadium. Thus, on the final fixture, AEK, with a procedural 4–0 victory against Volos were crowned champions, with the award ceremony taking place inside their new stadium, and celebrations taking place throughout Nea Filadelfeia.

AEK began their obligations in the Cup in its single-leg fifth round, where they easily overcame the obstacle of PAS Giannina with a 2–0 home win. AEK showed depth in their roster and Almeyda's philosophy of having a "cup squad" that mainly consisted of substitutes. As in the previous season, in the round of 16 they faced A.E. Kifisia. With 2 easy wins at both legs the yellow-blacks were qualified for the quarter finals. There they faced Panserraikos, where again with easy wins at both legs AEK were qualified to the next round. The draw for the semi-finals brought AEK their first derby in the institution facing Olympiacos. In the first match at Nea Filadelfeia, Almeyda faithful to his tactics, used the "Cup squad", despite the theoretical difficulty of the match, causing the concerns of the crowd. Nevertheless, AEK stormed into the match and "suffocated" Olympiacos competitively, winning them by the imposing 3–0. In the replay match at Faliro, the red and whites, despite their greatest efforts, the best they could do was an honorary 2–1 win, which gave the qualification to the yellow-blacks. AEK were in the final of the Greek Cup for the 6th time in the last 8 years with PAOK being their opponent. The administration of the HFF, seemed unable to find a venue to host the final with many stadiums not only from Greece, but the rest of the world as possible candidates and everything seemed to be leading to a dead end. Eventually a solution was found and the final was set on 24 May at Panthessaliko Stadium. AEK once again came in imposing their game to the club of Thessaloniki. However, at the 6th minute the game changed as Lazaros Rota was sent-off, leaving AEK with 10 players for almost the entire duration of the match. The numerical disadvantage made the yellow-blacks defend for the rest of the game, while PAOK took the initiative. The defence of AEK was effective against their opponent and in the middle of the first half, the yellow-blacks took the lead with a header of Moukoudi. In the rest of the match the image remained the same, but in the final minutes, AEK scored another goal with a solo effort by Paolo Fernandes and finished the match. With the conquest of the Cup, AEK achieved their third domestic double in their history, starting a new wave of celebrations from the fans at Nea Filadelfeia.

== Management team ==
Position	Staff
Manager	(Argentina) Matías Almeyda
Assistant manager	(Argentina) Omar Zarif
Assistant manager	(Argentina) Daniel Vega
Goalkeeping coach	(Argentina) Carlos Roa
Fitness coach	(Argentina) Guido Bonini
Fitness coach	(Greece) Kostas Parousis
Fitness coach	(Greece) Sotiris Mavros
Technical director	(Poland) Radosław Kucharski
Executive director	(Greece) Panagiotis Kone
Sporting director	(Portugal) Bruno Alves
Scout	(Greece) Stamoulis Petrou
Scout	(Greece) Dimitrios Xouris
Scout	(Greece) Fanouris Goundoulakis
Head of Medical	(Greece) Lakis Nikolaou
Academy manager	(Greece) Gennaios Karachalios
Academy director	(Greece) Ilias Kyriakidis

- Source: aekfc.gr

== Players ==
=== Squad information ===
NOTE: The players are the ones that have been announced by the AEK Athens' press release. No edits should be made unless a player's arrival or exit is announced. Updated 24 May 2023, 23:00 UTC+3.

No.	Player	Nat.	Position(s)	Date of birth (Age)	Signed	Previous club	Transfer fee	Contract until
Goalkeepers
1	Cican Stanković	(Austria)	GK	4 November 1992 (aged 30)	2021	(Austria) Red Bull Salzburg	€1,150,000	2025
30	Georgios Athanasiadis (Vice-captain 4)	(Greece)	GK	7 April 1993 (aged 30)	2019	(Greece) Asteras Tripolis	Free	2025
Defenders
2	Harold Moukoudi	(Cameroon) (France)	CB	27 November 1997 (aged 25)	2022	(France) Saint-Étienne	Free	2026
3	Milad Mohammadi	(Iran)	LB / LM / LW	29 September 1993 (aged 29)	2021	(Belgium) Gent	Free	2025
12	Lazaros Rota	(Greece) (Albania)	RB / RM	23 August 1997 (aged 25)	2021	(Netherlands) Fortuna Sittard	Free	2026
21	Domagoj Vida	(Croatia)	CB / RB	29 April 1989 (aged 34)	2022	(Turkey) Beşiktaş	Free	2024
24	Gerasimos Mitoglou	(Greece)	CB	20 October 1999 (aged 23)	2021	(Greece) Volos	€300,000	2026
26	Ehsan Hajsafi	(Iran)	LB / LM / LW / AM / CM / DM	25 February 1990 (aged 33)	2021	(Iran) Sepahan	Free	2025
29	Djibril Sidibé	(France) (Mali)	RB / LB / RM / CB	29 July 1992 (aged 30)	2022	(France) Monaco	Free	2024
31	Georgios Tzavellas	(Greece)	CB / LB	26 October 1987 (aged 35)	2021	(Turkey) Alanyaspor	€400,000	2023
Midfielders
4	Damian Szymański (Vice-captain)	(Poland)	DM / CM / AM	16 June 1995 (aged 28)	2020	(Russia) Akhmat Grozny	1,300,000	2027
6	Jens Jønsson	(Denmark)	DM / CM / CB	10 January 1993 (aged 30)	2022	(Spain) Cádiz	Free	2026
8	Mijat Gaćinović	(Serbia) (Bosnia and Herzegovina)	AM / CM / LM / LW / RM / RW	8 February 1995 (aged 28)	2022	(Germany) Hoffenheim	€1,000,000	2026
10	Steven Zuber (Vice-captain 3)	(Switzerland)	LM / LW / AM / RM / RW / SS / ST	17 August 1991 (aged 31)	2022	(Germany) Eintracht Frankfurt	€1,600,000	2025
13	Orbelín Pineda	(Mexico)	AM / CM / LM / LW / RM / RW / SS / DM / RB	24 March 1996 (aged 27)	2022	(Spain) Celta de Vigo	Free	2023
14	Alexander Fransson	(Sweden)	CM / DM / AM / RM	2 April 1994 (aged 29)	2022	(Sweden) Norrköping	Free	2023
19	Niclas Eliasson	(Sweden) (Brazil)	RM / LM / RW / LW	7 December 1995 (aged 27)	2022	(France) Nîmes	€2,000,000	2027
20	Petros Mantalos	(Greece)	AM / LM / CM / LW / SS / RM / RW	31 August 1991 (aged 31)	2014	(Greece) Xanthi	€500,000	2024
22	Paolo Fernandes	(Spain)	AM / RM / LM / RW / LW	19 August 1998 (aged 24)	2023	(Greece) Volos	€700,000	2027
25	Konstantinos Galanopoulos (Vice-captain 2)	(Greece)	CM / DM	28 December 1997 (aged 25)	2015	(Greece) AEK Athens U20	—	2024
Forwards
5	Nordin Amrabat	(Morocco) (Netherlands)	RW / LW / RM / LM / AM / SS / ST	31 March 1987 (aged 36)	2021	(Saudi Arabia) Al Nassr	Free	2023
7	Levi García	(Trinidad and Tobago)	ST / RW / RM / SS / LW / LM	20 November 1997 (aged 25)	2020	(Israel) Beitar Jerusalem	€2,600,000	2025
9	Tom van Weert	(Netherlands)	ST / SS	7 June 1990 (aged 33)	2022	(Greece) Volos	€500,000	2024
11	Sergio Araujo (Captain)	(Argentina)	ST / SS / LW / RW	28 January 1992 (aged 31)	2021	(Spain) Las Palmas	€1,462,500	2024
53	Theodosis Macheras	(Greece)	LW / RW / RM / LM	9 May 2000 (aged 23)	2020	(Greece) AEK Athens U19	—	2026
Left during Summer Transfer Window
17	Christos Albanis	(Greece)	LW / RW / LM / RM / SS	4 November 1994 (aged 28)	2018	(Greece) Apollon Smyrnis	€400,000	2024
Left during Winter Transfer Window
—	Panagiotis Tsintotas	(Greece)	GK	4 July 1993 (aged 29)	2017	(Greece) Levadiakos	Free	2023
From AEK Athens B
39	Panagiotis Ginis	(Greece)	GK	23 January 1999 (aged 24)	2018	(Greece) AEK Athens U19	—	2023
61	Vasilios Chatziemmanouil	(Greece)	GK	9 August 1999 (aged 23)	2018	(Greece) AEK Athens U19	—	2025
99	Georgios Theocharis	(Greece)	GK	30 June 2002 (aged 21)	2020	(Greece) AEK Athens U19	—	2024
15	Žiga Laci	(Slovenia) (Hungary)	CB	20 July 2002 (aged 20)	2020	(Slovenia) Mura	€400,000	2026
37	Vedad Radonja	(Bosnia and Herzegovina)	RB / LB / RM / DM	6 September 2001 (aged 21)	2020	(Croatia) Dinamo Zagreb U19	Free	2025
42	Ajdi Dajko	(Albania) (Greece)	CB / DM	28 August 2002 (aged 20)	2022	(Greece) Asteras Tripolis	Free	2025
44	Anel Šabanadžović	(Bosnia and Herzegovina) (United States)	CM / DM	24 May 1999 (aged 24)	2019	(Bosnia and Herzegovina) Željezničar	€450,000	2023
46	Konstantinos Roukounakis	(Greece)	DM / CM	17 July 2001 (aged 21)	2021	(Greece) AEK Athens U19	—	2026
80	Georgios Moustakopoulos	(Greece)	DM / CM / AM	13 August 1998 (aged 24)	2021	(Greece) Panachaiki	Free	2023
97	Judah García	(Trinidad and Tobago)	AM / LM / LW / CM	24 October 2000 (aged 22)	2021	(India) NEROCA	Free	2024
98	Giannis Fivos Botos	(Greece)	AM / CM / LM / RM	20 December 2000 (aged 22)	2018	(Greece) AEK Athens U19	—	2024
35	Michalis Kosidis	(Greece)	ST	9 February 2002 (aged 21)	2021	(Greece) AEK Athens U19	—	2026
70	Efthymis Christopoulos	(Greece)	ST / SS / RW / LW	20 September 2000 (aged 22)	2020	(Greece) AEK Athens U19	—	2023
72	Apostolos Christopoulos	(Greece)	ST / SS	29 January 2003 (aged 20)	2021	(Greece) AEK Athens U19	—	2024
82	Spyros Skondras	(Greece)	LW / LM	6 April 2001 (aged 22)	2022	(Greece) Panetolikos	Free	2025
90	Zini	(Angola)	ST / SS / LW / LM / RW / RM	3 July 2002 (aged 20)	2023	(Angola) 1º de Agosto	€350,000	2028

== Transfers ==
=== In ===
==== Summer ====
No.	Pos.	Player	From	Fee	Date	Contract Until	Source
2	DF	(Cameroon) Harold Moukoudi	(France) Saint-Étienne	Free transfer^{[a]}	18 August 2022	30 June 2026	
6	MF	(Denmark) Jens Jønsson	(Spain) Cádiz	Free transfer	7 July 2022	30 June 2026	
8	MF	(Serbia) Mijat Gaćinović	(Germany) Hoffenheim	€1,000,000^{[b]}	28 June 2022	30 June 2026	
9	FW	(Netherlands) Tom van Weert	(Greece) Volos	€500,000	6 September 2022	30 June 2024	
10	MF	(Switzerland) Steven Zuber	(Germany) Eintracht Frankfurt	€1,600,000	1 July 2022	30 June 2025	
17	FW	(Greece) Christos Albanis	(Cyprus) Apollon Limassol	Loan return	1 July 2022	30 June 2024	
19	MF	(Sweden) Niclas Eliasson	(France) Nîmes	€2,000,000	29 August 2022	30 June 2027	
21	DF	(Croatia) Domagoj Vida	(Turkey) Beşiktaş	Free transfer	31 July 2022	30 June 2024	
22	MF	(Spain) Paolo Fernandes	(Greece) Volos	€700,000	15 September 2022	30 June 2027	
29	DF	(France) Djibril Sidibé	(France) Monaco	Free transfer	9 September 2022	30 June 2024	
30	GK	(Greece) Georgios Athanasiadis	(Moldova) Sheriff Tiraspol	Loan return	1 July 2022	30 June 2023	
40	DF	(Albania) Mario Mitaj	(Greece) AEK Athens B	Promotion	1 July 2022	30 June 2026	
53	FW	(Greece) Theodosis Macheras	(Greece) Ionikos	Loan return	1 July 2022	30 June 2026	
70	MF	(Greece) Giannis Fivos Botos	(Netherlands) Go Ahead Eagles	Loan return	1 July 2022	30 June 2024	
—	FW	(Serbia) Miloš Deletić	(Cyprus) Anorthosis Famagusta	Loan return	1 July 2022	30 June 2022	

==== Winter ====
No.	Pos.	Player	From	Fee	Date	Contract Until	Source
22	MF	(Spain) Paolo Fernandes	(Greece) Volos	Loan return	1 January 2023	30 June 2027	
98	MF	(Greece) Giannis Fivos Botos	(Moldova) Sheriff Tiraspol	Loan termination	20 January 2023	30 June 2024	
—	FW	(Greece) Christos Albanis	(Spain) Andorra	Loan termination^{[c]}	3 February 2022	30 June 2024	

=== Out ===
==== Summer ====
No.	Pos.	Player	To	Fee	Date	Source
2	DF	(Greece) Michalis Bakakis	(Greece) Panetolikos	Contract termination	1 September 2022	
6	MF	(France) Damien Le Tallec	(Russia) Torpedo Moscow	Contract termination	30 August 2022	
8	MF	(Portugal) André Simões	(Portugal) Famalicão	End of contract	30 June 2022	
10	FW	(Iran) Karim Ansarifard	(Cyprus) Omonia	Contract termination	30 August 2022	
16	MF	(Poland) Grzegorz Krychowiak	(Russia) Krasnodar	Loan return	30 June 2022	
17	MF	(Switzerland) Steven Zuber	(Germany) Eintracht Frankfurt	Loan return	30 June 2022	
21	DF	(Bosnia and Herzegovina) Ognjen Vranješ	(Turkey) Hatayspor	Contract termination	25 July 2022	
22	FW	(Sweden) Muamer Tanković	(Cyprus) Pafos	Free transfer^{[d]}	21 July 2022	
28	MF	(Ukraine) Yevhen Shakhov	(Ukraine) Zorya Luhansk	End of contract	22 September 2022	
40	DF	(Albania) Mario Mitaj	(Russia) Lokomotiv Moscow	€3,000,000	27 August 2022	
88	MF	(Switzerland) Darko Jevtić	(Russia) Rubin Kazan	Loan return	30 June 2022	
—	FW	(Serbia) Miloš Deletić	(Greece) Volos	End of contract	30 June 2022	

==== Winter ====
No.	Pos.	Player	To	Fee	Date	Source
98	MF	(Greece) Giannis Fivos Botos	(Greece) AEK Athens Β		20 January 2023	
—	GK	(Greece) Panagiotis Tsintotas	(Greece) PAS Giannina	Contract termination	27 November 2022	
—	FW	(Greece) Christos Albanis	(Spain) Andorra	Free transfer^{[e]}	3 February 2022	

=== Loan in ===
==== Summer ====
No.	Pos.	Player	From	Fee	Date	Until	Option to buy	Source
13	MF	(Mexico) Orbelín Pineda	(Spain) Celta de Vigo	Free	15 July 2022	30 June 2023	✗	

=== Loan out ===
==== Summer ====
No.	Pos.	Player	To	Fee	Date	Until	Option to buy	Source
5	DF	(Greece) Stratos Svarnas	(Poland) Raków Częstochowa	€200,000	11 June 2022	30 June 2023	✓	
17	FW	(Greece) Christos Albanis	(Spain) Andorra	Free	1 September 2022	30 June 2023	✗	
19	DF	(France) Clément Michelin	(France) Bordeaux	Free	16 August 2022	30 June 2023	✓	
22	MF	(Spain) Paolo Fernandes	(Greece) Volos	Free	15 September 2022	31 December 2022	✗	
70	MF	(Greece) Giannis Fivos Botos	(Moldova) Sheriff Tiraspol	Free	27 July 2022	30 June 2023	✓	

Notes

a. Saint-Étienne keeps the 30% of the player's rights.

b. Hoffenheim keeps 30% of the player's rights.

c. His loan was terminated in order for him to be transferred on a permanent deal.

d. AEK keeps the 50% of the player's rights.

e. AEK keeps the 40% of the player's rights.

=== Contract renewals ===
No.	Pos.	Player	Date	Former Exp. Date	New Exp. Date	Source
4	MF	(Poland) Damian Szymański	20 April 2023	30 June 2024	30 June 2027	
12	DF	(Greece) Lazaros Rota	1 February 2023	30 June 2024	30 June 2026	
24	DF	(Greece) Gerasimos Mitoglou	22 March 2023	30 June 2025	30 June 2026	
25	MF	(Greece) Konstantinos Galanopoulos	21 July 2022	30 June 2023	30 June 2024	
26	DF	(Iran) Ehsan Hajsafi	10 May 2023	30 June 2023	30 June 2025	
30	GK	(Greece) Georgios Athanasiadis	8 August 2022	30 June 2023	30 June 2025	
70	MF	(Greece) Giannis Fivos Botos	28 July 2022	30 June 2023	30 June 2024	

=== Overall transfer activity ===
==== Expenditure ====
Summer: ▼€5,800,000

Winter: ▼€0

Total: ▼€5,800,000

==== Income ====
Summer: ▲€3,200,000

Winter: ▲€0

Total: ▲€3,200,000

==== Net Totals ====
Summer: ▼€2,600,000

Winter: €0

Total: ▼€2,600,000

== Pre-season and friendlies ==
16 July 2022 Friendly	Genk	0–2	AEK Athens	Genk
17:00 EEST (UTC+3)	Dessers (penalty missed) 13'; Muñoz (yellow card) 26'; Hrošovský (yellow card) 47'	Report	Muñoz 3' (o.g.); Szymański (yellow card) 12'; Gaćinović (yellow card) 16'; Zuber (yellow card) 24'; Mitoglou 33', (yellow card) 43'; Kornezos (yellow card) 84'	Stadium: Cegeka Arena; Referee: Bert Put (Belgium)

22 July 2022 Friendly	AEK Athens	2–1	Volendam	Alkmaar
20:00 EEST (UTC+3)	Pineda (yellow card) 29'; Araujo 32'; Kosidis 72' (pen.); Amrabat (yellow card) 78'	Report	Van Mieghem 4'; Ould-Chikh (yellow card) 45+1'; Nazih (yellow card) 71'	Stadium: Sportpark Overdie; Referee: Ed Janssen (Netherlands)
Note: 100-minute match (25-minute quarters).

27 July 2022 Friendly	AEK Athens	1–0	Utrecht	Alkmaar
17:00 EEST (UTC+3)	Szymański (yellow card) 33'; García 50'	Report	Van der Maarel (yellow card) 23'	Stadium: Sportpark Overdie; Referee: Max von Kreukhizen (Netherlands)

5 August 2022 Friendly	Omonia	0–2	AEK Athens	Nicosia
20:00 EEST (UTC+3)		Report	Pineda 21'; Szymański (yellow card) 37'; Mantalos (yellow card) 60', (goal) 65'; Hajsafi (yellow card) 73'	Stadium: GSP Stadium; Attendance: 7,243; Referee: Menelaos Antoniou (Cyprus)

13 August 2022 Friendly	AEK Athens	4–0	Proodeftiki	Spata
19:00 EEST (UTC+3)	Pineda 20', 30'; Jønsson 45'; Mohammadi 99'	Report		Stadium: Spata Training Centre; Attendance: Behind closed doors
Note: 135-minute match (Three 45-minute periods).

23 September 2022 Friendly	AEK Athens	1–0	Apollon Smyrnis	Spata
19:00 EEST (UTC+3)	Macheras 50'	Report		Stadium: Spata Training Centre; Attendance: Behind closed doors

4 December 2022 Friendly	AEK Athens	2–0	RFC Seraing	Burgh Haamstede
13:00 EET (UTC+2)	Araujo 13', (yellow card) 44'; Mitoglou 20'	Report	Cachbach (yellow card) 44'	Stadium: Sportpark van Zuijen

9 December 2022 Friendly	AEK Athens	1–0	OFI	Spata
15:00 EET (UTC+2)	García 24'	Report		Stadium: Spata Training Centre; Attendance: Behind closed doors

== Competitions ==
=== Overall record ===
Competition	First match	Last match	Starting round	Final position	Record							
Competition	First match	Last match	Starting round	Final position	Pld	W	D	L	GF	GA	GD	Win %
Super League	20 August 2022	12 March 2023	Matchday 1	Runners-up	26	19	2	5	51	14	+37	73.08
Super League Play-offs	19 March 2023	14 May 2023	Matchday 1	Winners	10	7	3	0	18	3	+15	70.00
Greek Cup	20 October 2022	24 May 2023	Fifth Round	Winners	8	7	0	1	19	3	+16	87.50
Total					44	33	5	6	88	20	+68	75.00

Last updated: 24 May 2023
Source: Competitions

=== Super League Greece ===
==== Regular season ====
===== League table =====
Pos	Team	Pld	W	D	L	GF	GA	GD	Pts	Qualification or relegation
1	Panathinaikos	26	19	4	3	38	12	+26	61	Qualification for the Play-off round
2	AEK Athens	26	19	2	5	51	14	+37	59	Qualification for the Play-off round
3	Olympiacos	26	16	8	2	53	14	+39	56	Qualification for the Play-off round
4	PAOK	26	15	9	2	43	15	+28	54	Qualification for the Play-off round
5	Aris	26	12	4	10	38	24	+14	40	Qualification for the Play-off round

Source: Super League Greece
Rules for classification: 1) Points; 2) Head-to-head points; 3) Head-to-head goal difference; 4) Goal difference; 5) Goals scored; 6) Play-offs (neutral ground).
(Note: Criterion 6 is only used if needed to decide champion, teams for relegation or teams for UEFA competitions).

===== Results summary =====
Overall								Home						Away					
Pld	W	D	L	GF	GA	GD	Pts	W	D	L	GF	GA	GD	W	D	L	GF	GA	GD
26	19	2	5	51	14	+37	59	11	0	2	29	6	+23	8	2	3	22	8	+14

Last updated: 2023-03-12.
Source: Super League Greece

===== Results by Matchday =====
Round	1	2	3	4	5	6	7	8	9	10	11	12	13	14	15	16	17	18	19	20	21	22	23	24	25	26
Ground	A	H	H	A	A	H	A	H	A	H	A	H	A	H	A	A	H	H	A	H	A	H	A	H	A	H
Result	W	L	W	L	W	W	W	W	W	W	D	W	D	W	W	L	W	W	W	W	W	W	L	W	W	L
Position	1	5	4	7	4	2	2	2	2	2	2	2	2	2	2	2	2	2	2	1	2	2	2	2	1	2

Updated to match(es) played on 8 March 2023. Source: slgr.gr
A = Away; H = Home; W = Win; D = Draw; L = Loss; P = Postponed

===== Matches =====
20 August 2022 1	Lamia	0–3	AEK Athens	Lamia
21:30 EEST (UTC+3)	De Vincenti (penalty missed) 33'; Tzanetopoulos (yellow card) 49'	Report	Araujo 35', 65'; Szymański (yellow card) 62'; Pineda 73'	Stadium: Lamia Municipal Stadium; Attendance: 2,002; Referee: Aristomenis Koutsiaftis (Arta); Man of the Match: Sergio Araujo

27 August 2022 2	AEK Athens	0–1	Volos	Rizoupoli
21:30 EEST (UTC+3)	Jønsson (yellow card) 47'; Vida (yellow card) 54'; Gaćinović (yellow card) 90+1'	Report	Deletić 19'; Luna (yellow card) 20'; Metaxas (yellow card) 35'; Klaiman (yellow card) 64'; Matilla (yellow card) 85'; Van Weert (yellow card) 90+9'	Stadium: Georgios Kamaras Stadium; Attendance: 12,526; Referee: Ioannis Papadopoulos (Macedonia); Man of the Match: Miloš Deletić

4 September 2022 3	AEK Athens	2–0	PAS Giannina	Rizoupoli
21:30 EEST (UTC+3)	Pineda 39'; Szymański (yellow card) 41'; Tzavellas (yellow card) 80'; Amrabat 87'	Report	Pamlidis (yellow card) 28'	Stadium: Georgios Kamaras Stadium; Attendance: 13,072; Referee: Evangelos Manouchos (Argolida); Man of the Match: Orbelín Pineda

11 September 2022 4	Panathinaikos	2–1	AEK Athens	Ampelokipoi
21:30 EEST (UTC+3)	Brignoli (yellow card) 37'; Aitor 43' (pen.); Šporar (yellow card) 45+5', (goal) 45+7' (pen.); Čerin (yellow card) 56'	Report	Pineda 36', (yellow card) 37'; Hajsafi (yellow card) 42'; Tzavellas (yellow card) 45+5'	Stadium: Leoforos Alexandras Stadium; Attendance: 13,943; Referee: Georgi Kabakov (Bulgaria); Man of the Match: Aitor Cantalapiedra

17 September 2022 5	Panetolikos	0–2	AEK Athens	Agrinio
20:00 EEST (UTC+3)	Apostolakis (yellow card) 6'; Chatzitheodoridis (yellow card) 44'; Kolovos (yellow card) 90+6'	Report	Eliasson (yellow card) 21'; Rota (yellow card) 44'; García 48'; Hajsafi (yellow card) 62'; Moukoudi 75'	Stadium: Panetolikos Stadium; Attendance: 2,671; Referee: Aristotelis Diamantopoulos (Arcadia); Man of the Match: Harold Moukoudi

3 October 2022 6	AEK Athens	4–1	Ionikos	Nea Filadelfeia
20:00 EEST (UTC+3)	Gaćinović 6', 65'; García 26'; Araujo 62'	Report	Ioannidis (yellow card) 42'; Eleftheriadis 90+3'	Stadium: Agia Sophia Stadium; Attendance: 31,100; Referee: Vasilis Fotias (Pella); Man of the Match: Mijat Gaćinović
Note: First official match at Nea Filadelfeia after 7,094 days. The game started with a 20-minute delay, due to the thousands of flares that were lit by fans of AEK before and during the entry of the teams into the field.

9 October 2022 7	Aris	0–2	AEK Athens	Thessaloniki
21:15 EEST (UTC+3)	Dabo (yellow card) 73'	Report	Moukoudi (yellow card) 6'; Szymański 28'; García 50'; Araujo (yellow card) 54'; Athanasiadis (yellow card) 81'	Stadium: Kleanthis Vikelidis Stadium; Attendance: 11,846; Referee: Gustavo Correia (Portugal); Man of the Match: Damian Szymański

16 October 2022 8	AEK Athens	1–0	Atromitos	Nea Filadelfeia
16:00 EEST (UTC+3)	Pineda (yellow card) 37'; Eliasson (yellow card) 47'; Amrabat 90+4' (pen.)	Report	De Bock (yellow card) 24'; Erlingmark (yellow card) 38'; Gianniotis (yellow card) 82'; Mavrommatis (yellow card) 90+3'; Suárez (yellow card) 90+9'	Stadium: Agia Sophia Stadium; Attendance: 30,528; Referee: Anastasios Sidiropoulos (Dodecanese); Man of the Match: Orbelín Pineda

24 October 2022 9	Levadiakos	0–2	AEK Athens	Livadeia
18:00 EEST (UTC+3)	Hammond (yellow card) 16'; Nikas (yellow card) 43'; Vinícius (yellow card) 77'	Report	Pineda (yellow card) 45+1'; García 50', 70' (pen.); Mantalos (yellow card) 81'	Stadium: Levadia Municipal Stadium; Attendance: 3,225; Referee: Christos Vergetis (Arcadia); Man of the Match: Levi García

30 October 2022 10	AEK Athens	2–0	PAOK	Nea Filadelfeia
19:30 EET (UTC+2)	García 36'; Gaćinović 61', (yellow card) 63'; Eliasson (yellow card) 81'	Report	Dantas (yellow card) 41'; Oliveira (yellow card) 51'; Sastre (yellow card) 56'	Stadium: Agia Sophia Stadium; Attendance: 31,100; Referee: Daniel Stefański (Poland); Man of the Match: Sergio Araujo

6 November 2022 11	Asteras Tripolis	1–1	AEK Athens	Tripoli
20:30 EET (UTC+2)	Barrales (yellow card) 28'; Sito (yellow card) 51'; Riera (yellow card) 53'; Crespí 58'; Iglesias (yellow card) 69'; Munafo (yellow card) 71'	Report	Amrabat 52' (pen.); Szymański (yellow card) 73'; Araujo (yellow card) 76'	Stadium: Theodoros Kolokotronis Stadium; Attendance: 1,120; Referee: Vasilis Fotias (Pella); Man of the Match: Nikos Papadopoulos

9 November 2022 12	AEK Athens	3–0	OFI	Nea Filadelfeia
20:00 EET (UTC+2)	García 6' (pen.); Gaćinović 11'; Mantalos 60'	Report	Þórarinsson (yellow card) 32'	Stadium: Agia Sophia Stadium; Attendance: 29,128; Referee: Aristomenis Koutsiaftis (Arta); Man of the Match: Mijat Gaćinović

13 November 2022 13	Olympiacos	0–0	AEK Athens	Piraeus
19:30 EET (UTC+2)	Reabciuk (yellow card) 79'; Papastathopoulos (yellow card) 90'; M'Vila (yellow card) 90+8'	Report	Amrabat (yellow card) 40'; Moukoudi (yellow card) 72'; Araujo (yellow card) 86'	Stadium: Karaiskakis Stadium; Attendance: 31,717; Referee: Glenn Nyberg (Sweden); Man of the Match: Mijat Gaćinović
Note: The match started with an 8-minute delay and was stopped at the 60th minute for 6 minutes, due to the suffocating atmosphere created by the flares lit by the fans of Olympiacos.

21 December 2022 14	AEK Athens	3–0	Lamia	Nea Filadelfeia
17:00 EET (UTC+2)	Van Weert (yellow card) 58', (goal) 67', 90+4'; Rota (yellow card) 68'; García 88'; Jønsson (yellow card) 90+3'	Report	Manousos (yellow card) 2'; Bejarano (yellow card) 6'; Šaranov (yellow card) 68'	Stadium: Agia Sophia Stadium; Attendance: 23,571; Referee: Evangelos Manouchos (Argolida); Man of the Match: Tom van Weert

28 December 2022 15	Volos	0–4	AEK Athens	Volos
19:30 EET (UTC+2)	Alho (yellow card) 28'; Klaiman (yellow card) 36'; Knockaert (yellow card) 60'	Report	Mitoglou 16'; Pineda 30'; Van Weert 35'; García 67'	Stadium: Panthessaliko Stadium; Attendance: 8,600; Referee: Petros Tsagarakis (Chania); Man of the Match: Sergio Araujo

3 January 2023 16	PAS Giannina	2–1	AEK Athens	Ioannina
20:00 EET (UTC+2)	Rienstra 9'; Bălan 32'; Pamlidis (yellow card) 77'; Erramuspe (yellow card) 90+1'; Tsintotas (yellow card) 90+4'	Report	Araujo 51'; Amrabat (yellow card) 90+1'	Stadium: Zosimades Stadium; Attendance: Behind closed doors Referee: Vasilis Fotias (Pella); Man of the Match: Claudiu Bălan

8 January 2023 17	AEK Athens	1–0	Panathinaikos	Nea Filadelfeia
19:30 EET (UTC+2)	García (yellow card) 60', (penalty missed) 90+10'; Sidibé (yellow card) 67'; Pineda 68'	Report	Verbič (yellow card) 45+2'; Schenkeveld (yellow card) 67'; Magnússon (yellow card) 90+5'; Palacios (yellow card) 90+5'	Stadium: Agia Sophia Stadium; Attendance: 31,100; Referee: António Nobre (Portugal); Man of the Match: Orbelín Pineda

15 January 2023 18	AEK Athens	4–1	Panetolikos	Nea Filadelfeia
16:00 EET (UTC+2)	Araujo 13'; García 35'; Pineda 51'; Amrabat 55'	Report	João Pedro 39' (pen.), (yellow card) 66'; Liavas (yellow card) 64'; Chatzitheodoridis (yellow card) 68'; Shengelia (yellow card) 83'	Stadium: Agia Sophia Stadium; Attendance: 28,200; Referee: Christos Vergetis (Arcadia); Man of the Match: Nordin Amrabat

22 January 2023 19	Ionikos	1–2	AEK Athens	Nikaia
16:00 EET (UTC+2)	Fadiga (yellow card) 35'; Sebá 38'; Valerianos (yellow card) 64'; Romao (yellow card) 69'; Cañas (yellow card) 83'; Cañas (yellow card) 84'	Report	Vida (yellow card) 41', (goal) 82'; Szymański (yellow card) 55'; Moukoudi (yellow card) 60'; Zuber 90+2', (yellow card) 90+2'; Rota (yellow card) 90+3'	Stadium: Neapoli Stadium; Attendance: 948; Referee: Anastasios Sidiropoulos (Dodecanese); Man of the Match: Steven Zuber

29 January 2023 20	AEK Athens	3–0	Aris	Nea Filadelfeia
19:30 EET (UTC+2)	Amrabat 18' (pen.), (yellow card) 32'; Hajsafi (yellow card) 41'; Szymański (yellow card) 51'; Gaćinović 76'; Moukoudi (yellow card) 84'; Pineda 89'	Report	Fabiano (yellow card) 22'; Peersman (yellow card) 30'; Etebo (yellow card) 46' (yellow-red card) 60'; Dabo (yellow card) 78'	Stadium: Agia Sophia Stadium; Attendance: 30,483; Referee: Miguel Godinho (Portugal); Man of the Match: Sergio Araujo

8 March 2023 21	Atromitos	0–1	AEK Athens	Peristeri
17:30 EET (UTC+2)	De Bock (yellow card) 30'; Klonaridis (yellow card) 90+2'	Report	Zuber 31'	Stadium: Peristeri Stadium; Attendance: 2,224; Referee: Dimitrios Karantonis (Imathia); Man of the Match: Djibril Sidibé
Note: The match was scheduled to take place on 5 February. However, the referee did not start the game, since an irregularity was discovered after measuring the posts of a goalpost and because the problem was not fixed even after the half hour that Atromitos was allowed for fixing it. At 14 February the sport's judge decided that the match would take place on a new date and with new referees. After AEK's appeal was declined, the game was decided to take place on 8 March.

12 February 2023 22	AEK Athens	3–0	Levadiakos	Nea Filadelfeia
18:30 EET (UTC+2)	García 37'; Amrabat 45+3' (pen.); Szymański (yellow card) 51'; Zuber (penalty missed) 77'; Van Weert 84'; Gaćinović (yellow card) 90+3'	Report	Tzimopoulos (yellow card) 36' (yellow-red card) 45+2'; Vinícius (yellow card) 41'; Vrakas (yellow card) 30'	Stadium: Agia Sophia Stadium; Attendance: 24,102; Referee: Ioannis Papadopoulos (Macedonia); Man of the Match: Levi García

19 February 2023 23	PAOK	2–0	AEK Athens	Thessaloniki
20:30 EET (UTC+2)	Narey 14', (yellow card) 79'; Koulierakis 62'	Report	Araujo (yellow card) 21'	Stadium: Toumba Stadium; Attendance: 18,410; Referee: Espen Eskås (Norway); Man of the Match: Giannis Konstantelias

26 February 2023 24	AEK Athens	2–0	Asteras Tripolis	Nea Filadelfeia
17:30 EET (UTC+2)	Tzavellas (yellow card) 11'; Araujo 32'; Gaćinović 76'	Report	Gardawski (red card) 4'; Barrales (yellow card) 11'	Stadium: Agia Sophia Stadium; Attendance: 26,200; Referee: Giorgos Tzovaras (Phthiotis); Man of the Match: Mijat Gaćinović

5 March 2023 25	OFI	0–3	AEK Athens	Heraklion
19:30 EET (UTC+2)	Bakić (yellow card) 34'; Larsson (yellow card) 52'; Dicko (yellow card) 71'	Report	Vida (yellow card) 34'; Amrabat 43', 49', (yellow card) 76'; Gaćinović 62'	Stadium: Theodoros Vardinogiannis Stadium; Attendance: 5,100; Referee: Aristotelis Diamantopoulos (Arcadia); Man of the Match: Nordin Amrabat

12 March 2023 26	AEK Athens	1–3	Olympiacos	Nea Filadelfeia
19:00 EET (UTC+2)	Amrabat (yellow card) 60'; Zuber 81', (yellow card) 90+5'; Vida (yellow card) 88'	Report	Biel (yellow card) 6' (yellow-red card) 70'; Ba (yellow card) 45+2'; Moukoudi 50' (o.g.); Bakambu 53'; Fortounis (yellow card) 58'; Hwang (yellow card) 62'; Canós 67'; El-Arabi (yellow card) 88'	Stadium: Agia Sophia Stadium; Attendance: 31,100; Referee: Maurizio Mariani (Italy); Man of the Match: Cédric Bakambu

==== Play-off round ====
===== Table =====
Pos	Team	Pld	W	D	L	GF	GA	GD	Pts	Qualification
1	AEK Athens (C)	36	26	5	5	69	17	+52	83	Qualification for the Champions League third qualifying round
2	Panathinaikos	36	23	9	4	47	16	+31	78	Qualification for the Champions League second qualifying round
3	Olympiacos	36	21	10	5	70	24	+46	73	Qualification for the Europa League third qualifying round
4	PAOK	36	19	10	7	57	32	+25	67	Qualification for the Europa Conference League second qualifying round
5	Aris	36	15	6	15	55	41	+14	51	Qualification for the Europa Conference League second qualifying round
6	Volos	36	11	7	18	35	66	−31	40	

Source: Super League Greece
Rules for classification: 1) Points; 2) Head-to-head points (Regular season and play-off); 3) Head-to-head goal difference (Regular season and play-off); 4) Regular season position.
(C) Champions

===== Results summary =====
Overall								Home						Away					
Pld	W	D	L	GF	GA	GD	Pts	W	D	L	GF	GA	GD	W	D	L	GF	GA	GD
10	7	3	0	18	3	+15	24	3	2	0	11	1	+10	4	1	0	7	2	+5

Last updated: 2023-05-14.
Source: Super League Greece

===== Results by Matchday =====
Round	1	2	3	4	5	6	7	8	9	10
Ground	H	A	A	H	A	H	A	H	A	H
Result	D	W	W	W	W	W	D	D	W	W
Position	2	2	2	2	2	2	2	2	1	1

Updated to match(es) played on 14 May 2023. Source: slgr.gr
A = Away; H = Home; W = Win; D = Draw; L = Loss; P = Postponed

===== Matches =====
19 March 2023 1	AEK Athens	0–0	Panathinaikos	Nea Filadelfeia
21:30 EET (UTC+2)	Amrabat (yellow card) 19'; Araujo (yellow card) 35'	Report	Kourbelis (yellow card) 76'; Pérez (yellow card) 77'; Brignoli (yellow card) 82'; Çokaj (red card) 90+8'	Stadium: Agia Sophia Stadium; Attendance: 30,450; Referee: Nikola Dabanović (Montenegro); Man of the Match: Georgios Athanasiadis
Note: Before the start of the match, the matrixes of the stadium showed clips from old interviews of the resently deceased Mimis Papaioannou, while the team's anthemn was playing and the fans of AEK before the start of the game raised a card stunt in his memory. Afterwards, a minute's silence was observed in the center of the field by the people of both teams.

2 April 2023 2	PAOK	0–1	AEK Athens	Thessaloniki
19:30 EEST (UTC+3)	Sastre (yellow card) 3'; Augusto (yellow card) 9'; Oliveira (yellow card) 61'; Taison (yellow card) 90+4'	Report	Araujo (yellow card) 53', (goal) 80'; Tzavellas (yellow card) 59'; Szymański (yellow card) 68'; Mantalos (yellow card) 90+3'	Stadium: Toumba Stadium; Attendance: 21,771; Referee: Aleksei Kulbakov (Belarus); Man of the Match: Sergio Araujo

5 April 2023 3	Volos	0–1	AEK Athens	Volos
18:00 EEST (UTC+3)	Deletić (yellow card) 25'	Report	Pineda 7'	Stadium: Panthessaliko Stadium; Attendance: 6,396; Referee: Anastasios Sidiropoulos (Dodecanese); Man of the Match: Orbelín Pineda

9 April 2023 4	AEK Athens	3–1	Aris	Nea Filadelfeia
18:00 EEST (UTC+3)	Gaćinović (yellow card) 20'; García 36' (pen.); Zuber 82', 90+5'; Rota (yellow card) 86'; Fernandes (yellow card) 86'; Mantalos (yellow card) 90+3'; Tzavellas (yellow card) 90+3'	Report	Etebo (yellow card) 24'; Iturbe (yellow card) 38' (goal) 45+1'; Dabo (yellow card) 86'; Christodoulopoulos (yellow card) 90+3'	Stadium: Agia Sophia Stadium; Attendance: 30,380; Referee: Aristotelis Diamantopoulos (Arcadia); Man of the Match: Steven Zuber

23 April 2023 5	Olympiacos	1–3	AEK Athens	Piraeus
21:00 EEST (UTC+3)	Rodinei (yellow card) 41'; Bakambu 54'; Fortounis (yellow card) 66'	Report	Gaćinović 7'; Szymański (yellow card) 40'; Pineda (yellow card) 43'; García 82' (pen.); Mantalos 90+1'	Stadium: Karaiskakis Stadium; Attendance: 25,015; Referee: Davide Massa (Italy); Man of the Match: Mijat Gaćinović

26 April 2023 6	AEK Athens	4–0	PAOK	Nea Filadelfeia
21:00 EEST (UTC+3)	Zuber 21'; Moukoudi 24'; Amrabat (yellow card) 59'; García 77'; Fernandes 86'	Report	Kargas (red card) 10'; Schwab (yellow card) 27'	Stadium: Agia Sophia Stadium; Attendance: 30,570; Referee: Tobias Stieler (Germany); Man of the Match: Jens Jønsson

30 April 2023 7	Panathinaikos	0–0	AEK Athens	Ampelokipoi
20:00 EEST (UTC+3)	Magnússon (yellow card) 43'; Kourbelis (yellow card) 85'	Report	Gaćinović (yellow card) 24'; Moukoudi (yellow card) 44'; Vida (yellow card) 71'; Mantalos (yellow card) 89'	Stadium: Leoforos Alexandras Stadium; Attendance: 13,373; Referee: Artur Soares Dias (Portugal); Man of the Match: Levi García

3 May 2023 8	AEK Athens	0–0	Olympiacos	Nea Filadelfeia
20:00 EEST (UTC+3)		Report	Tzolakis (yellow card) 55'; Bakambu (yellow card) 71'; Rodinei (yellow card) 73'; Hwang (yellow card) 89'	Stadium: Agia Sophia Stadium; Attendance: 31,100; Referee: Jérôme Brisard (France); Man of the Match: Ehsan Hajsafi

8 May 2023 9	Aris	1–2	AEK Athens	Thessaloniki
21:00 EEST (UTC+3)	Gray 17' (pen.); Christodoulopoulos (yellow card) 45+1'; Darida (yellow card) 88'; Kamara (yellow card) 90'	Report	Van Weert 23'; Zuber 43', (yellow card) 64'; Mantalos (yellow card) 72'; Rota (yellow card) 90+1'	Stadium: Kleanthis Vikelidis Stadium; Attendance: 7,620; Referee: Vasilis Fotias (Pella); Man of the Match: Steven Zuber
Note: The matchday was to be held on 7 May, but at the request of Panathinaikos due to the cases of COVID-19 within their players and staff members, it was postponed for a day later.

14 May 2023 10	AEK Athens	4–0	Volos	Nea Filadelfeia
20:00 EEST (UTC+3)	Zuber 16'; Gaćinović 33'; Pineda 59'; Szymański 85'	Report		Stadium: Agia Sophia Stadium; Attendance: 31,100; Referee: Evangelos Manouchos (Argolida); Man of the Match: Steven Zuber

=== Greek Cup ===
AEK entered the Greek Cup at the fifth round.

==== Matches ====
20 October 2022 Fifth round	AEK Athens	2–0	PAS Giannina	Nea Filadelfeia
19:00 EEST (UTC+3)	Kosidis 6'; Galanopoulos (yellow card) 74'; Mantalos 68' (pen.); Araujo (yellow card) 82'	Report	Lolis (yellow card) 60'	Stadium: Agia Sophia Stadium; Referee: Aristotelis Diamantopoulos (Arcadia); Man of the Match: Petros Mantalos

===== Round of 16 =====
15 December 2022 First leg	A.E. Kifisia	0–2	AEK Athens	Rizoupoli
21:30 EET (UTC+2)	Peios (yellow card) 36'; Na'a (yellow card) 65'; Barbosa (yellow card) 71' (yellow-red card) 78'; Mazoulouxis (yellow card) 72'	Report	García 34'; Van Weert 45+3' (pen.)	Stadium: Georgios Kamaras Stadium; Referee: Kostas Tsetsilas (Grevena); Man of the Match: Levi García

11 January 2023 Second leg	AEK Athens	3–0 (5–0 agg.)	A.E. Kifisia	Nea Filadelfeia
19:00 EET (UTC+2)	Moustakopoulos 27'; Randonja 48'; Mantalos (yellow card) 73'; Macheras 82'	Report	Tetteh (yellow card) 44'	Stadium: Agia Sophia Stadium; Referee: Angelos Evangelou (Athens); Man of the Match: Georgios Moustakopoulos

===== Quarter-finals =====
18 January 2023 First leg	AEK Athens	3–0	Panserraikos	Nea Filadelfeia
17:30 EET (UTC+2)	Fernandes (yellow card) 37'; Mantalos 55'; García 67'; Pineda 89'	Report	Giannarakis (yellow card) 32'	Stadium: Agia Sophia Stadium; Referee: Fotis Polychronis (Pieria); Man of the Match: Petros Mantalos

25 January 2023 Second leg	Panserraikos	1–3 (1–6 agg.)	AEK Athens	Serres
17:30 EET (UTC+2)	Katsantonis 49'	Report	Mantalos 21', 51', (yellow card) 43'; Macheras 80'	Stadium: Serres Municipal Stadium; Referee: Stavros Tsimenteridis (Kozani); Man of the Match: Petros Mantalos

===== Semi-finals =====
9 February 2023 First leg	AEK Athens	3–0	Olympiacos	Nea Filadelfeia
20:30 EET (UTC+2)	García 3', 90+12' (pen.); Samassékou 27' (o.g.); Galanopoulos (yellow card) 63'; Araujo (yellow card) 88'	Report	Valbuena (yellow card) 90+1'	Stadium: Agia Sophia Stadium; Referee: Nikola Dabanović (Montenegro); Man of the Match: Djibril Sidibé

12 April 2023 Second leg	Olympiacos	2–1 (2–4 agg.)	AEK Athens	Piraeus
19:30 EEST (UTC+3)	Valbuena 27'; Fortounis (yellow card) 45'; Hwang 57'; Bakambu (yellow card) 59'; Valbuena (yellow card) 61'; Paschalakis (yellow card) 87'; Reabciuk (yellow card) 87'; Ba (yellow card) 90+5'	Report	Mohammadi (yellow card) 12'; Ba 52' (o.g.); Galanopoulos (yellow card) 64'; Szymański (yellow card) 86'; Hajsafi (yellow card) 90+2'; Gaćinović (yellow card) 90+3'	Stadium: Karaiskakis Stadium; Referee: Aliyar Aghayev (Azerbaijan); Man of the Match: Hwang In-beom

===== Final =====
24 May 2023 Final	AEK Athens	2–0	PAOK	Volos
20:30 EET (UTC+3)	Rota (red card) 6'; Moukoudi 26'; Szymański (yellow card) 35'; Fernandes 90+2'; Amrabat (yellow card) 89'	Report	Schwab (yellow card) 40'; Augusto (yellow card) 49'	Stadium: Panthessaliko Stadium; Attendance: Behind closed doors Referee: Felix Brych (Germany); Man of the Match: Harold Moukoudi

== Statistics ==
=== Squad statistics ===
As of 24 May 2023

No.	Pos	Player	Super League		Super League Play-offs		Greek Cup		Total	
No.	Pos	Player	Apps	Goals	Apps	Goals	Apps	Goals	Apps	Goals
Goalkeepers
1	GK	(Austria) Cican Stanković	6	0	0	0	8	0	14	0
30	GK	(Greece) Georgios Athanasiadis	20	0	10	0	0	0	30	0
Defenders
2	DF	(Cameroon) Harold Moukoudi	20	1	7	1	3	1	30	3
3	DF	(Iran) Milad Mohammadi	10	0	3	0	1	0	14	0
12	DF	(Greece) Lazaros Rota	22	0	9	0	5	0	36	0
21	DF	(Croatia) Domagoj Vida	22	1	9	0	2	0	33	1
24	DF	(Greece) Gerasimos Mitoglou	7	1	1	0	7	0	15	1
28	DF	(Iran) Ehsan Hajsafi	20	0	9	0	6	0	35	0
29	DF	(France) Djibril Sidibé	9	0	3	0	5	0	17	0
31	DF	(Greece) Georgios Tzavellas	8	0	5	0	5	0	18	0
Midfielders
4	MF	(Poland) Damian Szymański	21	1	9	1	4	0	34	2
6	MF	(Denmark) Jens Jønsson	24	0	10	0	5	0	39	0
8	MF	(Serbia) Mijat Gaćinović	20	7	10	2	5	0	35	9
10	MF	(Switzerland) Steven Zuber	18	3	10	5	6	0	34	8
13	MF	(Mexico) Orbelín Pineda	26	7	10	2	6	1	42	10
14	MF	(Sweden) Alexander Fransson	2	0	0	0	4	0	6	0
19	MF	(Sweden) Niclas Eliasson	16	0	10	0	4	0	30	0
20	MF	(Greece) Petros Mantalos	21	1	9	1	8	4	38	6
22	MF	(Spain) Paolo Fernandes	6	0	8	1	5	1	19	2
25	MF	(Greece) Konstantinos Galanopoulos	8	0	4	0	5	0	17	0
Forwards
5	FW	(Morocco) Nordin Amrabat	23	8	8	0	3	0	34	8
7	FW	(Trinidad and Tobago) Levi García	23	11	8	3	6	4	37	18
9	FW	(Netherlands) Tom van Weert	11	4	2	1	4	1	17	6
11	FW	(Argentina) Sergio Araujo	25	6	4	1	5	0	34	7
53	FW	(Greece) Theodosis Macheras	1	0	0	0	2	2	3	2
Left during Summer Transfer Window
17	FW	(Greece) Christos Albanis	1	0	0	0	0	0	1	0
Left during Summer Winter Window
—	GK	(Greece) Panagiotis Tsintotas	0	0	0	0	0	0	0	0
From AEK Athens B
39	GK	(Greece) Panagiotis Ginis	0	0	0	0	0	0	0	0
61	GK	(Greece) Vasilios Chatziemmanouil	0	0	0	0	0	0	0	0
99	GK	(Greece) Georgios Theocharis	0	0	0	0	0	0	0	0
15	DF	(Slovenia) Žiga Laci	0	0	0	0	0	0	0	0
37	DF	(Bosnia and Herzegovina) Vedad Radonja	0	0	0	0	4	1	4	1
42	DF	(Albania) Ajdi Dajko	0	0	0	0	0	0	0	0
44	MF	(Bosnia and Herzegovina) Anel Šabanadžović	0	0	0	0	0	0	0	0
46	MF	(Greece) Konstantinos Roukounakis	0	0	0	0	0	0	0	0
80	MF	(Greece) Georgios Moustakopoulos	0	0	0	0	1	1	1	1
97	MF	(Trinidad and Tobago) Judah García	0	0	0	0	0	0	0	0
98	MF	(Greece) Giannis Fivos Botos	0	0	0	0	0	0	0	0
35	FW	(Greece) Michalis Kosidis	2	0	0	0	3	1	5	1
70	FW	(Greece) Efthymis Christopoulos	1	0	0	0	1	0	2	0
72	FW	(Greece) Apostolos Christopoulos	0	0	0	0	0	0	0	0
82	FW	(Greece) Spyros Skondras	0	0	0	0	1	0	1	0
90	FW	(Angola) Zini	0	0	2	0	0	0	2	0

=== Goalscorers ===
As of 24 May 2023
The list is sorted by competition order when total goals are equal, then by position and then by squad number.

Rank	No.	Pos.	Player	Super League	Super League Play-offs	Greek Cup	Total
1	7	FW	(Trinidad and Tobago) Levi García	11	3	4	18
2	13	MF	(Mexico) Orbelín Pineda	7	2	1	10
3	8	MF	(Serbia) Mijat Gaćinović	7	2	0	9
4	5	FW	(Morocco) Nordin Amrabat	8	0	0	8
4	10	MF	(Switzerland) Steven Zuber	3	5	0	8
6	11	FW	(Argentina) Sergio Araujo	6	1	0	7
7	9	FW	(Netherlands) Tom van Weert	4	1	1	6
7	20	MF	(Greece) Petros Mantalos	1	1	4	6
9	2	DF	(Cameroon) Harold Moukoudi	1	1	1	3
10	4	MF	(Poland) Damian Szymański	1	1	0	2
10	22	MF	(Spain) Paolo Fernandes	0	1	1	2
10	53	FW	(Greece) Theodosis Macheras	0	0	2	2
13	21	DF	(Croatia) Domagoj Vida	1	0	0	1
13	24	DF	(Greece) Gerasimos Mitoglou	1	0	0	1
13	37	DF	(Bosnia and Herzegovina) Vedad Radonja	0	0	1	1
13	80	MF	(Greece) Georgios Moustakopoulos	0	0	1	1
13	35	FW	(Greece) Michalis Kosidis	0	0	1	1
Own goals				0	0	2	2
Totals				51	18	19	88

=== Assists ===
As of 24 May 2023
The list is sorted by competition order when total assists are equal, then by position and then by squad number.

Rank	No.	Pos.	Player	Super League	Super League Play-offs	Greek Cup	Total
1	11	FW	(Argentina) Sergio Araujo	7	0	1	8
1	19	MF	(Sweden) Niclas Eliasson	6	1	1	8
3	20	MF	(Greece) Petros Mantalos	5	2	0	7
4	7	FW	(Trinidad and Tobago) Levi García	3	2	1	6
5	10	MF	(Switzerland) Steven Zuber	0	2	3	5
6	13	MF	(Mexico) Orbelín Pineda	2	1	1	4
7	5	FW	(Morocco) Nordin Amrabat	3	0	0	3
7	8	MF	(Serbia) Mijat Gaćinović	2	0	1	3
7	26	DF	(Iran) Ehsan Hajsafi	1	1	1	3
7	29	DF	(France) Djibril Sidibé	1	0	2	3
11	21	DF	(Croatia) Domagoj Vida	2	0	0	2
11	12	DF	(Greece) Lazaros Rota	1	0	1	2
11	6	MF	(Denmark) Jens Jønsson	0	2	0	2
14	3	DF	(Iran) Milad Mohammadi	1	0	0	1
14	22	MF	(Spain) Paolo Fernandes	1	0	0	1
14	25	MF	(Greece) Konstantinos Galanopoulos	0	0	1	1
14	35	FW	(Greece) Michalis Kosidis	0	0	1	1
Totals				35	11	14	60

=== Clean sheets ===
As of 24 May 2023
The list is sorted by competition order when total clean sheets are equal and then by squad number. Clean sheets in games where both goalkeepers participated are awarded to the goalkeeper who started the game. Goalkeepers with no appearances are not included.

Rank	No.	Player	Super League	Super League Play-offs	Greek Cup	Total
1	30	(Greece) Georgios Athanasiadis	14	7	0	21
2	1	(Austria) Cican Stanković	3	0	6	9
Totals			17	7	6	30

=== Disciplinary record ===
As of 24 May 2023

N	P	Nat.	Name	Super League			Super League Play-offs			Greek Cup			Total			Notes
N	P	Nat.	Name	Yellow card	Second yellow card	Red card	Yellow card	Second yellow card	Red card	Yellow card	Second yellow card	Red card	Yellow card	Second yellow card	Red card	Notes
Goalkeepers
1	GK	(Austria)	Cican Stanković													
30	GK	(Greece)	Georgios Athanasiadis	1									1			
Defenders
2	DF	(Cameroon)	Harold Moukoudi	4			1						5			
3	DF	(Iran)	Milad Mohammadi							1			1			
12	DF	(Greece)	Lazaros Rota	3			2					1	5		1	
21	DF	(Croatia)	Domagoj Vida	4			1						5			
24	DF	(Greece)	Gerasimos Mitoglou													
28	DF	(Iran)	Ehsan Hajsafi	3						1			4			
29	DF	(France)	Djibril Sidibé	1									1			
31	DF	(Greece)	Georgios Tzavellas	3			2						5			
Midfielders
4	MF	(Poland)	Damian Szymański	7			2			2			11			
6	MF	(Denmark)	Jens Jønsson	2			1						3			
8	MF	(Serbia)	Mijat Gaćinović	3			2			1			6			
10	MF	(Switzerland)	Steven Zuber	2			1						3			
13	MF	(Mexico)	Orbelín Pineda	3			2						5			
14	MF	(Sweden)	Alexander Fransson													
19	MF	(Sweden)	Niclas Eliasson	3									3			
20	MF	(Greece)	Petros Mantalos	1			4			2			7			
22	MF	(Spain)	Paolo Fernandes				1			1			2			
25	MF	(Greece)	Konstantinos Galanopoulos							3			3			
Forwards
5	FW	(Morocco)	Nordin Amrabat	5			2			1			8			
7	FW	(Trinidad and Tobago)	Levi García	1									1			
9	FW	(Netherlands)	Tom van Weert													
11	FW	(Argentina)	Sergio Araujo	4			2			2			8			
53	FW	(Greece)	Theodosis Macheras													
Left during Summer Transfer Window
17	FW	(Greece)	Christos Albanis													
Left during Winter Transfer Window
—	GK	(Greece)	Panagiotis Tsintotas													
From AEK Athens B
39	GK	(Greece)	Panagiotis Ginis													
61	GK	(Greece)	Vasilios Chatziemmanouil													
99	GK	(Greece)	Georgios Theocharis													
15	DF	(Slovenia)	Žiga Laci													
37	DF	(Bosnia and Herzegovina)	Vedad Radonja													
42	DF	(Albania)	Ajdi Dajko													
44	MF	(Bosnia and Herzegovina)	Anel Šabanadžović													
46	MF	(Greece)	Konstantinos Roukounakis													
80	MF	(Greece)	Georgios Moustakopoulos													
97	MF	(Trinidad and Tobago)	Judah García													
98	MF	(Greece)	Giannis Fivos Botos													
35	FW	(Greece)	Michalis Kosidis													
70	FW	(Greece)	Efthymis Christopoulos													
72	FW	(Greece)	Apostolos Christopoulos													
82	FW	(Greece)	Spyros Skondras													
90	FW	(Angola)	Zini													

=== Starting 11 ===
This section presents the most frequently used formation along with the players with the most starts across all competitions.

N.	Formation	Matchday(s)
39	4–1–3–2	5–26
3	4–2–3–1	3, 4
2	3–5–2	1, 2

No.	Nat.	Player	Pos.
30	(Greece)	Georgios Athanasiadis	GK
21	(Croatia)	Domagoj Vida	RCB
2	(Cameroon)	Harold Moukoudi	LCB
12	(Greece)	Lazaros Rota	RB
26	(Iran)	Ehsan Hajsafi	LB
4	(Poland)	Damian Szymański	DM
13	(Mexico)	Orbelín Pineda	RM
8	(Serbia)	Mijat Gaćinović	LM
6	(Denmark)	Jens Jønsson	AM
11	(Argentina)	Sergio Araujo (C)	SS
7	(Trinidad and Tobago)	Levi García	CF

Last updated: 2023-05-24

== Awards ==
Player	Pos.	Award	Source
(Serbia) Mijat Gaćinović	MF	Stoiximan Best Goal (6th Matchday)	
(Poland) Damian Szymański	MF	Stoiximan Best Goal (7th Matchday)	
(Mexico) Orbelín Pineda	MF	Stoiximan Best Goal (15th Matchday)	
(Netherlands) Tom van Weert	FW	Stoiximan Player of the Month (December)	
(Argentina) Sergio Araujo	FW	Stoiximan Best Goal (18th Matchday)	
(Switzerland) Steven Zuber	MF	Stoiximan Best Goal (19th Matchday)	
(Argentina) Sergio Araujo	FW	Stoiximan Best Goal Playoffs/Playouts (2nd Matchday)	
(Greece) Georgios Athanasiadis	GK	Stoiximan Player of the Month (March)	
(Serbia) Mijat Gaćinović	MF	Stoiximan Best Goal Playoffs/Playouts (5th Matchday)	
(Mexico) Orbelín Pineda	MF	Stoiximan Best Goal Playoffs/Playouts (10th Matchday)	
(Mexico) Orbelín Pineda	MF	Stoiximan Player of the Club	
(Mexico) Orbelín Pineda	MF	Stoiximan Player of the Season	
(Mexico) Orbelín Pineda	MF	Foreign Player of the Season	
(Argentina) Matías Almeyda	—	Manager of the Season	
(Cameroon) Harold Moukoudi	DF	Team of the Season	
(Iran) Ehsan Hajsafi	DF	Team of the Season	
(Serbia) Mijat Gaćinović	MF	Team of the Season	
(Mexico) Orbelín Pineda	MF	Team of the Season	
(Trinidad and Tobago) Levi García	FW	Team of the Season	
