= 2023 Greek Football Cup final =

2023 Greek Cup final
- Match poster
- Event: 2022–23 Greek Football Cup
AEK Athens	PAOK
2	0
- Date: 24 May 2023
- Venue: Panthessaliko Stadium, Volos
- Man of the Match: Harold Moukoudi (AEK Athens)
- Referee: Felix Brych (Germany)
- Attendance: Behind closed doors
- Weather: Fair; 21 °C (70 °F); 68% humidity

The 2023 Greek Cup final was the 79th final of the Greek Cup. It took place on 24 May 2023 at Panthessaliko Stadium. The contesting teams were AEK Athens and PAOK. It was AEK Athens' twenty-seventh Greek Cup final in their 99 years of existence and PAOK's twenty third Greek Cup final and third consecutive, of their 97-year history. After the continuous refusals of the mayor of Volos, Achilleas Beos to grant Panthessaliko Stadium to host the match, as the proclamation dictated, a series of consultations occurred about the venue of the match throughout the season. The HFF, examined many proposals which included stadiums in the United States, England, Germany, Poland, Romania, Serbia, Cuprus, Albania and stadiums all over Greece. Eventually, Beos accepted and it was decided at 12 May that the match would take place at Panthessaliko Stadium.

== Venue ==
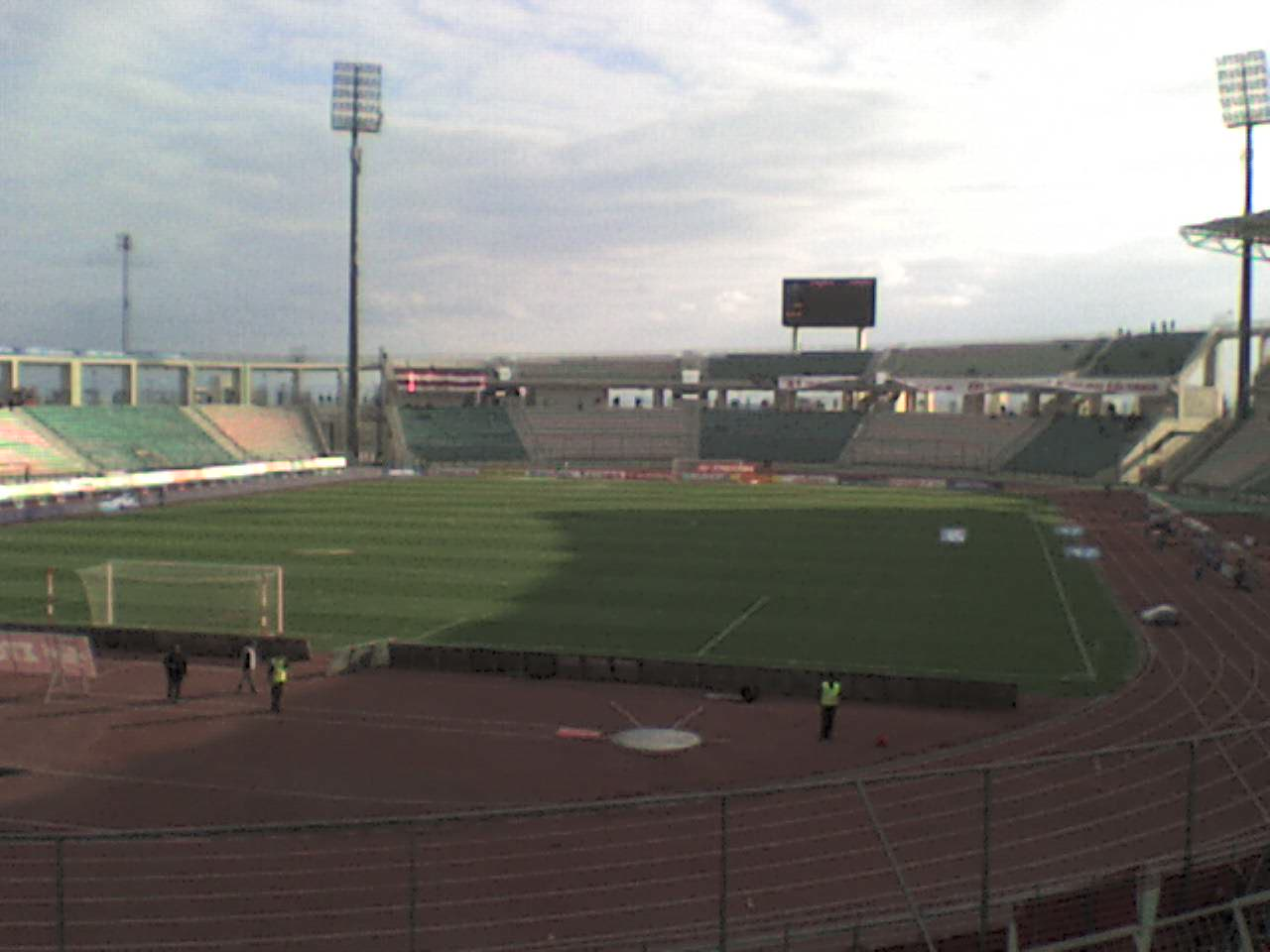
Panthessaliko Stadium.

This was the fourth Greek Cup final held at Panthessaliko Stadium after the 2007, 2017 and 2020 finals.

Panthessaliko Stadium was built in 2004. The stadium is used as a venue for Niki Volos and Volos. Its current capacity is 22,189.

== Background ==
AEK Athens had reached the Greek Cup final twenty-six times, winning fifteen of them. The last time that they had won the Cup was in 2016 (2–1 against Olympiacos). The last time that had played in a final was in 2020, where they had lost to Olympiacos by 1–0.

PAOK qualified for the Greek Cup final twenty-two times, winning eight of them. The last time they had won the Cup was in 2021 (2–1 against Olympiacos). The last time that had played in a final was in 2022, where they had lost to Panathinaikos by 1–0.

The two teams had met each other in a Cup final six times in the 1939, 1978, 1983, 2017, 2018 and 2019 finals.

== Route to the final ==
AEK Athens				Round	PAOK			
Opponent	Agg.	1st leg	2nd leg		Opponent	Agg.	1st leg	2nd leg
PAS Giannina	2–0 (H)			Fifth round	Bye			
A.E. Kifisia	5–0	2–0 (A)	3–0 (H)	Round of 16	Kalamata	4–0	2–0 (A)	2–0 (H)
Panserraikos	6–1	3–0 (H)	3–1 (A)	Quarter-finals	Panathinaikos	3–1	2–0 (H)	1–1 (A)
Olympiacos	4–2	3–0 (H)	1–2 (A)	Semi-finals	Lamia	6–2	5–1 (A)	1–1 (H)

== Match ==
=== Details ===
24 May 2023
20:30 EEST

AEK Athens	2–0	PAOK
Moukoudi 26'; Fernandes 90+2'	Report

Panthessaliko Stadium, Volos
Attendance: Behind closed doors
Referee: Felix Brych (Germany)

AEK Athens	PAOK

GK	1	(Austria) Cican Stanković
RB	12	(Greece) Lazaros Rota	(red card) 6'
CB	19	(Croatia) Domagoj Vida
CB	2	(Cameroon) Harold Moukoudi
LB	28	(Iran) Ehsan Hajsafi
DM	4	(Poland) Damian Szymański (c)	(yellow card) 35'	(substituted off) 61'
RM	19	(Sweden) Niclas Eliasson		(substituted off) 82'
LM	8	(Serbia) Mijat Gaćinović		(substituted off) 86'
AM	13	(Mexico) Orbelín Pineda		(substituted off) 62'
SS	10	(Switzerland) Steven Zuber
CF	7	(Trinidad and Tobago) Levi García		(substituted off) 62'
Substitutes:
GK	99	(Greece) Georgios Theocharis
DF	24	(Greece) Gerasimos Mitoglou
DF	29	(France) Djibril Sidibé		(substituted on) 62'
MF	6	(Denmark) Jens Jønsson		(substituted on) 61'
ΜF	20	(Greece) Petros Mantalos		(substituted on) 82'
MF	22	(Spain) Paolo Fernandes		(substituted on) 86'
FW	5	(Morocco) Nordin Amrabat	(yellow card) 90+2'	(substituted on) 62'
FW	9	(Netherlands) Tom van Weert
FW	99	(Angola) Zini
Manager:
(Argentina) Matías Almeyda

GK	40	(Croatia) Dominik Kotarski
RB	23	(Spain) Joan Sastre		(substituted off) 62'
CB	4	(Iceland) Sverrir Ingi Ingason (c)
CB	59	(Greece) Konstantinos Koulierakis		(substituted off) 86'
LB	55	(Portugal) Rafa Soares		(substituted off) 62'
CM	33	(Brazil) Douglas Augusto	(yellow card) 40'
CM	22	(Austria) Stefan Schwab	(yellow card) 49'	(substituted off) 78'
RM	11	(Brazil) Taison
LM	14	(Serbia) Andrija Živković
AM	65	(Greece) Giannis Konstantelias		(substituted off) 85'
CF	71	(Spain) Brandon Thomas
Substitutes:
GK	18	(Serbia) Živko Živković
DF	16	(Poland) Tomasz Kędziora		(substituted on) 86'
DF	20	(Portugal) Vieirinha		(substituted on) 62'
MF	26	(Portugal) Tiago Dantas
MF	7	(Morocco) Omar El Kaddouri		(substituted on) 78'
MF	50	(Portugal) Filipe Soares
MF	10	(Austria) Thomas Murg
MF	21	(Suriname) Diego Biseswar		(substituted on) 62'
FW	95	(Greece) Stefanos Tzimas		(substituted on) 85'
Manager:
(Romania) Răzvan Lucescu

Man of the Match:
Harold Moukoudi (AEK Athens)

Assistant referees:
Mark Borsch (Germany)
Stefan Lupp (Germany)
Fourth official:
Angelos Evangelou (Athens)
Video assistant referee:
Gunter Perl (Germany)
Assistant video assistant referee:
Vasilis Terovitsas (Aetoloacarnania)

Match rules

- 90 minutes
- 30 minutes of extra time if necessary
- Penalty shoot-out if scores still level
- Nine named substitutes, of which up to five may be used at maximum three times, with a sixth allowed in extra time.
