= Ihsan (name) =

Ihsan (also transliterated as Ehsan; Arabic, Persian and Urdu: إحسان or احسان, Kurdish: ئێحسان) is an Arabic masculine given name.

== Given name ==
Ihsan

- İhsan Oktay Anar (born 1960), Turkish writer
- İhsan Sabri Çağlayangil (1908–1993), Turkish politician
- Ihsan Danish (1914–1982), Urdu poet
- İhsan Doğramacı (1915–2010), Turkish academic
- Ihsan Ilahi Zahir (1945–1987), Pakistani Islamic scholar
- İhsan Hakan (1965–1993), PKK defector
- İhsan Ketin (1914–1995), Turkish earth scientist
- Ihsan Maulana Mustofa (born 1995), Indonesian badminton player
- Ihsan H. Nadiem (born 1940), Pakistani archaeologist, museologist, author and poet
- Ihsan Nuri (c. 1893–1976), Kurdish soldier and politician
- İhsan Burak Özsaraç (born 1979), Turkish footballer
- Ihsan Poyraz (born 1988), Austrian footballer
- Ihsan Abdel Quddous (1919–1990), Egyptian writer, novelist, and journalist
- İhsan Sabancı (1931–1979), Turkish businessman
- İhsan Saraçlar (1928–2008), Turkish lawyer and politician
- Ihsan Ali Al-Shehbaz (born 1939), Iraqi American botanist
- İhsan Emre Vural (born 1984), Turkish rower
- İhsan Yüce (1930–1991), Turkish actor

Ehsan

- Ehsan Adil (born 1993), Pakistani cricketer
- Ehsan Aman (born 1959), Afghan singer
- Ehsan Haddadi (born 1985), Iranian discus thrower
- Ehsan Hajysafi (born 1990), Iranian footballer
- Ehsan ul Haq (born 1949), Pakistani general
- Ehsan Jami (born 1985), Dutch politician
- Ehsan Kari (born 2002), Malagasy footballer
- Ehsan Khandozi (born 1980), Iranian economist and politician
- Ehsan Naghibazadeh (born 1990), Iranian Taekwondo practitioner
- Ehsan Yarshater (1920–2018), Iranian historian

Mid name

- Hafiz Ihsan Saeed (born 1978), Pakistani Guantanamo detainee

Surname

- Rakib Ehsan, British-Bangladeshi Phd., writer, media commentator

== See also ==
- Ihsan, Arabic term meaning benefaction
