= Poyraz =

Poyraz is a Turkish name, meaning north or northeasterly wind, from the Greek βορεάς, boreas (meaning "north" or "north wind"), and may refer to:

- Poyraz (name), male given name
- Poyraz, Elâzığ
