= Vedad Radonja =

Bosnian footballer

Personal information
- Date of birth: 6 September 2001 (age 25)
- Place of birth: Sarajevo, Bosnia and Herzegovina
- Height: 1.82 m (6 ft 0 in)
- Position: Right-back

Team information
- Current team: FC Hegelmann

Youth career
- Željezničar
- Dinamo Zagreb

Senior career*
Years	Team	Apps	(Gls)
2019–2020	Dinamo Zagreb II	2	(0)
2020–2025	AEK Athens	3	(0)
2021–2024	AEK Athens B	49	(4)
2024–2025	→ Lamia (loan)	19	(1)
2026–	FC Hegelmann	14	(1)

International career^{‡}
2018	Bosnia and Herzegovina U17	3	(0)
2019	Bosnia and Herzegovina U19	3	(0)
- * Club domestic league appearances and goals as of 30 May 2026 (UTC) ‡ National team caps and goals as of 07:52, 28 January 2021 (UTC)

Vedad Radonja (born 6 September 2001) is a Bosnian professional footballer who plays as a right-back.

== Career ==
Born in Sarajevo, Radonja began his career with the Zeljeznicar Academy before moving to Croatia and joining the youth academy at Dinamo Zagreb. He made two appearances with Dinamo Zagreb II. On 18 September 2020, Radonja signed with Super League Greece side AEK Athens on a five-year contract.

On 20 January 2021, Radonja made his professional debut for AEK Athens in a Greek Cup match against Apollon Smyrnis. He started and played the full match as AEK Athens won 2–0.

On 19 August 2024, he joined Lamia on a season-long loan.

On 11 January 2026 announced, that Vedad Radonja signed with lithianian Hegelmann Club.

== Career statistics ==
=== Club ===
As of match played 22 May 2025

Club	Season	League			Cup		Continental		Other		Total	
Club	Season	Division	Apps	Goals	Apps	Goals	Apps	Goals	Apps	Goals	Apps	Goals
AEK Athens	2020–21	Super League Greece	1	0	3	0	—		—		4	0
AEK Athens	2021–22	Super League Greece	0	0	0	0	—		—		0	0
AEK Athens	2022–23	Super League Greece	0	0	4	1	—		—		4	1
AEK Athens	2023–24	Super League Greece	2	0	0	0	—		—		2	0
AEK Athens	Total		3	0	7	1	0	0	0	0	10	1
AEK Athens B	2021–22	Super League Greece 2	20	0	—		—		—		20	0
AEK Athens B	2022–23	Super League Greece 2	9	1	—		—		—		9	1
AEK Athens B	2023–24	Super League Greece 2	20	3	—		—		—		20	3
AEK Athens B	Total		49	4	—		—		—		49	4
Lamia (loan)	2024–25	Super League Greece	19	1	1	0	—		—		20	1
Career total			53	4	7	1	0	0	0	0	60	4

== Honours ==
AEK Athens

- Super League Greece: 2022–23
- Greek Cup: 2022–23
