= Poyraz (name) =

- Gender: Male
- Language: Turkish

Origin
- Language: Greek
- Meaning: 'North-east wind'

Other names
- Related names: Bora, Rüzgar

Poyraz is a masculine Turkish given name and surname. In Turkish, it refers to the north-east wind. The name is derived from 'Boreas', the god of the north wind in Greek mythology.

== People ==
=== Given name ===
- Poyraz Efe Yıldırım (born 2005), Turkish footballer

=== Surname ===
- Ergün Poyraz (born 1963), Turkish author
- İhsan Poyraz (born 1988), Austrian-Turkish retired football player
- Burak Poyraz (born 1995), Turkish Muay Thai fighter

== See also ==
- Boreas
