= Georgios Moustakopoulos =

Greek footballer

Personal information
- Full name: Georgios Rafail Moustakopoulos
- Date of birth: 13 August 1998 (age 28)
- Place of birth: Patras, Greece
- Height: 1.77 m (5 ft 10 in)
- Position: Defensive midfielder

Youth career
- 2012–2017: Niki Proastiou

Senior career*
Years	Team	Apps	(Gls)
2017–2021	Panachaiki	68	(1)
2021–2023	AEK Athens B	30	(0)
2022–2023	AEK Athens	1	(0)
2023	Apollon Smyrnis	16	(1)
2023–2024	Athens Kallithea	25	(0)
2024–2025	Kalamata	24	(1)
2025–2026	Anagennisi Karditsa	18	(0)
2026–	Panachaiki	0	(0)

International career^{‡}
2018	Greece U20	2	(0)
2017–2018	Greece U21	1	(0)
- * Club domestic league appearances and goals as of 23 July 2026 ‡ National team caps and goals as of 11 January 2018

Georgios Moustakopoulos (Greek: Γεώργιος Μουστακόπουλος; born 13 August 1998) is a Greek professional footballer who plays as a defensive midfielder for Super League 2 club Panachaiki.

== Career ==
Moustakopoulos started his youth career in a local football club of Patra called Niki Proastiou from 2012 until 2017. He joined Panachaiki in 2017, starting his professional career. In 2021, he signed with AEK Athens B, later making a handful of senior appearances for AEK Athens.

In 2023, he briefly played for Apollon Smyrnis before transferring to Athens Kallithea later that year. He moved to Kalamata for the 2024–25 campaign, followed by a stint at Anagennisi Karditsa. On 17 July 2026, Moustakopoulos returned to his first professional club, Panachaiki.

== Career statistics ==
As of 23 July 2026

Club	Season	League			Cup		Continental		Other		Total	
Club	Season	Division	Apps	Goals	Apps	Goals	Apps	Goals	Apps	Goals	Apps	Goals
Panachaiki	2017–18	Superleague Greece 2	25	1	2	0	—		—		27	1
Panachaiki	2018–19	Superleague Greece 2	8	0	2	0	—		—		10	0
Panachaiki	2019–20	Superleague Greece 2	12	0	1	0	—		—		13	0
Panachaiki	2020–21	Superleague Greece 2	23	0	0	0	—		—		23	0
Panachaiki	Total		68	1	5	0	—		—		73	1
AEK Athens B	2021–22	Superleague Greece 2	24	0	—		—		—		24	0
AEK Athens B	2022–23	Superleague Greece 2	6	0	—		—		—		6	0
AEK Athens B	Total		30	0	—		—		—		30	0
AEK Athens	2021–22	Superleague Greece	1	0	1	0	—		—		2	0
AEK Athens	2022–23	Superleague Greece	0	0	1	1	—		—		1	1
AEK Athens	Total		1	0	2	1	—		—		3	1
Apollon Smyrnis	2022–23	Superleague Greece 2	16	1	0	0	—		—		16	1
Athens Kallithea	2023–24	Superleague Greece 2	24	0	2	1	—		—		26	1
Athens Kallithea	2024–25	Superleague Greece	1	0	0	0	—		—		1	0
Athens Kallithea	Total		25	0	2	1	—		—		27	1
Kalamata	2024–25	Superleague Greece 2	24	1	0	0	—		—		24	1
Anagennisi Karditsa	2025–26	Superleague Greece 2	18	0	1	0	—		—		19	0
Panachaiki	2026–27	Superleague Greece 2	0	0	0	0	—		—		0	0
Career total			182	3	10	2	0	0	0	0	192	5
