= Panthessaliko Stadium =

Football stadium in Volos, Greece

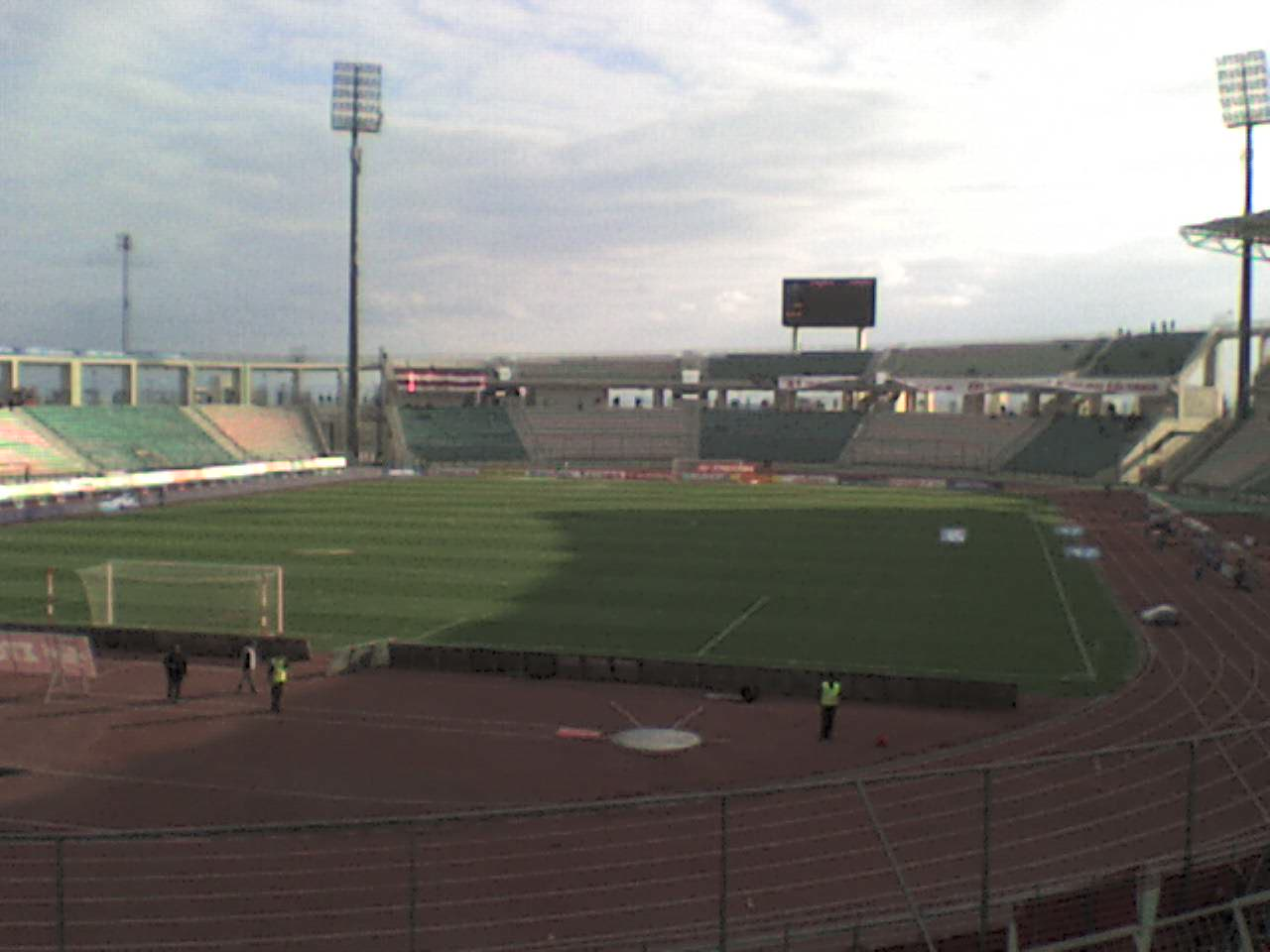
- Interactive map of Panthessaliko Stadium
- Full name: Panthessaliko Stadium
- Location: Volos, Greece
- Coordinates: 39°23′15″N 22°55′52″E
- Owner: Hellenic Olympic Committee
- Operator: Municipality of Volos
- Capacity: 22,189
- Surface: natural grass
- Scoreboard: 2
- Field size: 105 m × 68 m (344 ft × 223 ft)
- Public transit: Melissiatika railway station

Construction
- Built: 30 July 2004
- Cost: € 50,000,000

Tenant
- Volos

The Panthessaliko Stadium is a stadium located in Volos, Greece. The stadium was the site of football (soccer) matches during the 2004 Summer Olympics. It was officially opened on July 30, 2004, and has a capacity of 22,189 seats, though only 21,100 seats were made publicly available for the Olympic matches. The Panthessaliko Stadium is the home stadium of Volos which plays in the Super League Greece. It also hosted the 2007, 2017, 2020, 2023, 2024 and 2026 Greek Cup finals. Since 2022, it hosted a pair of matches of the Greece national football team both won by Greece.

== Facilities ==
Panthessaliko Stadium offers the following facilities, amenities, and attractions.

- 56 ports
- VIP Area
- Coffee shop
- Gymnasium with 100 meter track
- Doctor's office
- Journalistic theories
- Press room
- 2 Changing rooms
- 100-seat conference room

== Gallery ==
Exterior view of Panthessaliko Stadium

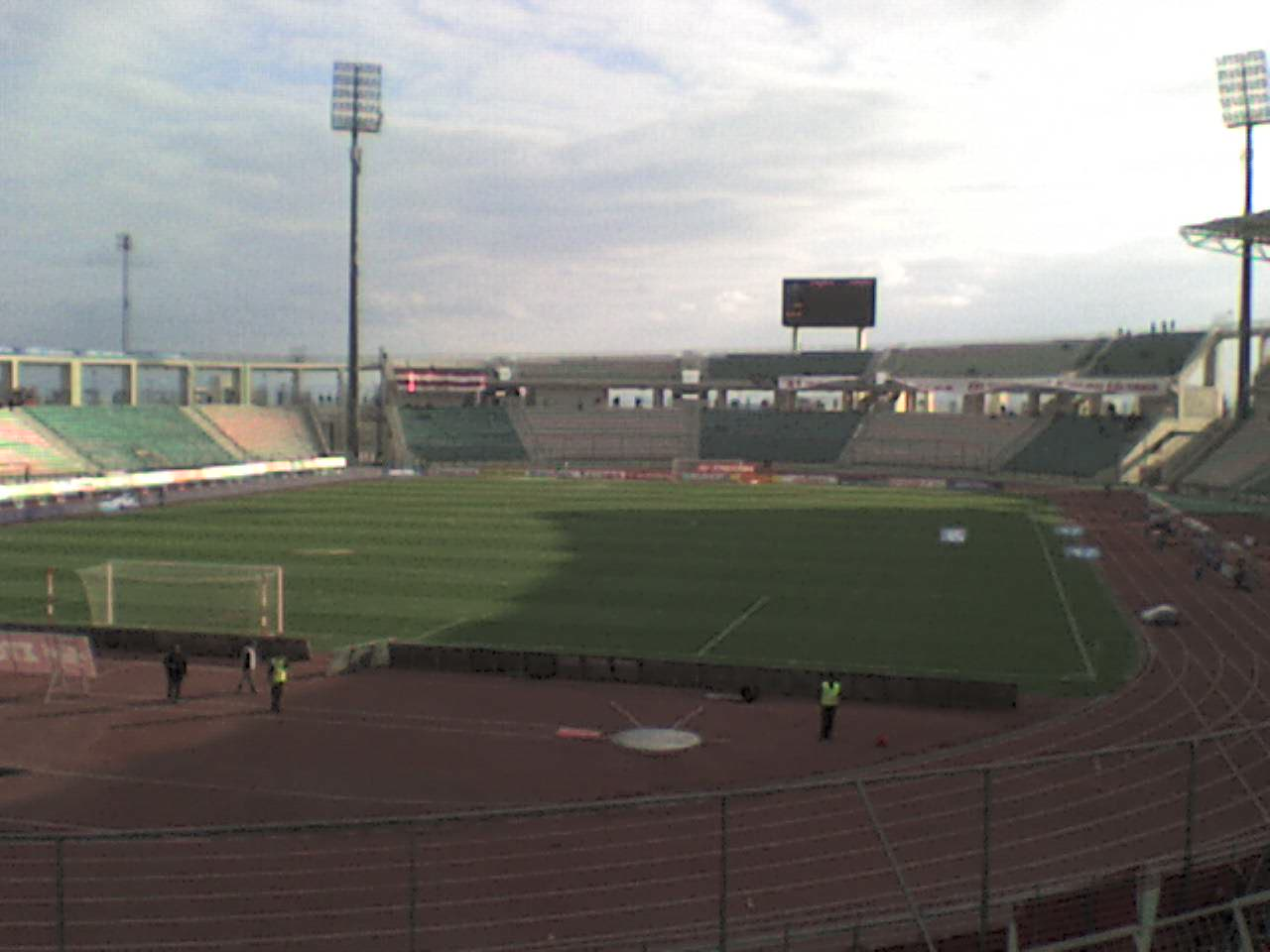
Panthessaliko Stadium
