= Rakib Ehsan =

British-Bangladeshi writer and commentator

- Born: Muhammad Rakib Bin Ehsan; April 1990 (age 36); London, England
- Education: Royal Holloway, University of London (BA, MSc, PhD)
- Occupations: Writer; journalist; media commentator; researcher; author
- Website: rakibehsan.com

Muhammad Rakib Bin Ehsan is a British writer, journalist, media commentator, researcher and author of the book Beyond Grievance. He is of Bangladeshi Muslim origin.

His PhD thesis explored the impact of social and workplace integration on the experiences and attitudes of British non-white ethnic minorities. He has written for such publications as The Daily Telegraph, The Spectator, The Independent, UnHerd and Spiked.

Ehsan has also been featured as a television commentator on TalkTV, Sky News, ITV, GB News and the BBC.

In 2024, Ehsan and co-writer Iain Mansfield authored A Portrait of Modern Britain, a research report on British ethnicity and religion, published by the conservative think tank Policy Exchange.
