= Ajdi Dajko =

Albanian footballer

Personal information
- Date of birth: 28 October 2002 (age 24)
- Place of birth: Korçë, Albania
- Height: 1.87 m (6 ft 2 in)
- Position: Centre-back

Team information
- Current team: LNZ Cherkasy
- Number: 4

Youth career
- PAOK
- Asteras Tripolis

Senior career*
Years	Team	Apps	(Gls)
2021–2022	Asteras Tripolis	0	(0)
2022–2023	AEK Athens B	16	(1)
2023–2024	Laçi	32	(0)
2024–	LNZ Cherkasy	32	(0)

International career^{‡}
2018	Albania U17	1	(0)
2023–	Albania U21	10	(0)
- * Club domestic league appearances and goals as of 3 June 2026 ‡ National team caps and goals as of 15:41, 14 July 2024 (UTC)

Ajdi Dajko (born 28 October 2002) is an Albanian professional footballer who plays as a centre-back for Ukrainian Premier League club LNZ Cherkasy.

== Career ==
On July 13, 2024 Ukrainian Premier League club FC LNZ Cherkasy confirmed that Dajko had joined the club.
