= Cican Stanković =

Austrian footballer

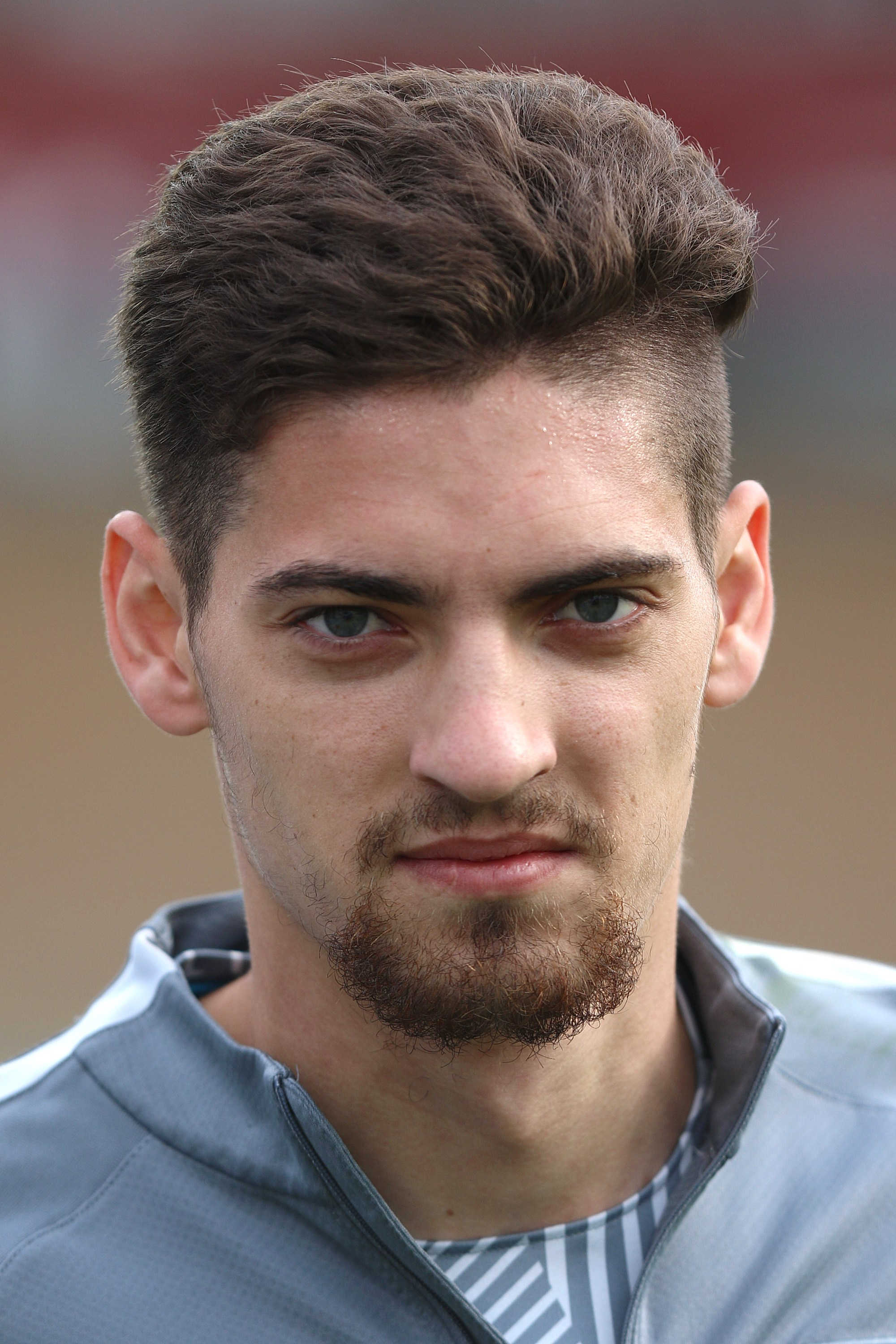
- Stanković with Red Bull Salzburg in 2017

Personal information
- Date of birth: 4 November 1992 (age 33)
- Place of birth: Bijeljina, Bosnia and Herzegovina
- Height: 1.86 m (6 ft 1 in)
- Position: Goalkeeper

Team information
- Current team: Grazer AK
- Number: 23

Youth career
- 2000–2004: SV Pressbaum
- 2004–2005: FC Tulln
- 2005–2006: SV Königstetten
- 2006–2007: USC Muckendorf/Zeiselmauer
- 2007–2011: SV Horn

Senior career*
Years	Team	Apps	(Gls)
2010–2013	SV Horn	68	(1)
2013–2015	SV Grödig	61	(0)
2015–2021	Red Bull Salzburg	152	(0)
2021–2025	AEK Athens	51	(0)
2026–	Grazer AK	3	(0)

International career^{‡}
2014	Austria U21	3	(0)
2019–	Austria	4	(0)
- * Club domestic league appearances and goals as of 10:05, 12 May 2025 (UTC) ‡ National team caps and goals as of 6 September 2019

Cican Stanković (German: [ˈstaŋkɔvɪtʃ]; Serbian Cyrillic: Цицан Станковић, pronounced [tsǐːtsan stǎːŋkoʋitɕ]; born 4 November 1992) is a professional footballer who plays as a goalkeeper for Austrian Bundesliga club Grazer AK. Born in Bosnia and Herzegovina, he plays for the Austria national team.

== Club career ==
Stanković was promoted to the senior squad of third-tier side SV Horn in 2010 and joined SV Grödig in 2013. He moved to Austrian powerhouse Red Bull Salzburg in 2015 with great success.

=== AEK Athens ===
On 31 May 2021, AEK Athens reached an agreement with Red Bull Salzburg for the purchase of the Austrian goalkeeper. The deal includes a €1,100,000 fee for Salzburg, whereas Stanković put pen to paper to a four-year contract, receiving €700,000 per year. The following day, AEK officially announced the signing of Stanković, who expressed his delight for joining the club and ambition to win titles.

Stanković played the first 6 games of the 2022/23 season, but would later on lose his starting position to Athanasiadis after a minor illness before the game against Aris. Despite that, AEK won the Greek Super League and the Greek Cup and Stanković played in all 8 Cup games, keeping 6 clean sheets and having a great performance in the final against PAOK. Stanković played in both legs against Dinamo Zagreb and AEK advanced to the Champions League play off round with an aggregate score of 4–3. During the 23/24 season Stanković participated in the group stages of the Europa League. He had two very good games against Brighton in Falmer Stadium and Ajax in Agia Sophia Stadium, but AEK finished 4th in their respective group. Stanković reached 50 league appearances with AEK Athens in the away game against Lamia in March. In this game, he kept a clean sheet and he provided an assist to Levi García, who scored a superb goal from distance.

=== Grazer AK ===
After not playing for a season, on 7 July 2026 Stanković signed a one-year deal with Grazer AK. In his third league game for the new club, he allowed 8 goals in a 0–8 loss against Rapid Wien.

== International career ==
Stanković made his debut for Austria national team on 6 September 2019 in a 2020 Euro qualifier against Latvia, as a starter.

== Career statistics ==
=== Club ===
As of match played 24 May 2023

Appearances and goals by club, season and competition
Club	Season	League			National cup (Note: Includes Austrian Cup, Greek Cup)		Europe		Total	
Club	Season	Division	Apps	Goals	Apps	Goals	Apps	Goals	Apps	Goals
SV Horn	2010–11	Austrian Regionalliga	3	0	0	0	—		3	0
SV Horn	2011–12	Austrian Regionalliga	28	0	0	0	—		28	0
SV Horn	2012–13	2. Liga	34	1	1	0	—		35	1
SV Horn	Total		65	1	1	0	—		66	1
SV Grödig	2013–14	Austrian Bundesliga	17	0	0	0	—		17	0
SV Grödig	2014–15	Austrian Bundesliga	35	0	5	0	4 (Note: Appearances in UEFA Europa League)	0	44	0
SV Grödig	Total		52	0	5	0	4	0	61	0
Red Bull Salzburg	2015–16	Austrian Bundesliga	5	0	2	0	2 (Note: Appearances in UEFA Champions League)	0	9	0
Red Bull Salzburg	2016–17	Austrian Bundesliga	2	0	6	0	1	0	9	0
Red Bull Salzburg	2017–18	Austrian Bundesliga	9	0	6	0	3 (Note: One appearance in UEFA Champions League, two appearances in UEFA Europa League)	0	18	0
Red Bull Salzburg	2018–19	Austrian Bundesliga	28	0	1	0	4	0	33	0
Red Bull Salzburg	2019–20	Austrian Bundesliga	27	0	5	0	6 (Note: Four appearances in UEFA Champions League, two appearances in UEFA Europa League)	0	38	0
Red Bull Salzburg	2020–21	Austrian Bundesliga	29	0	6	0	10 (Note: Eight appearances in UEFA Champions League, two appearances in UEFA Europa League)	0	45	0
Red Bull Salzburg	Total		100	0	26	0	26	0	152	0
AEK Athens	2021–22	Super League Greece	22	0	0	0	1 (Note: Appearance in UEFA Europa Conference League)	0	23	0
AEK Athens	2022–23	Super League Greece	6	0	8	0	—		14	0
AEK Athens	Total		28	0	8	0	1	0	37	0
Career total			245	1	40	0	31	0	316	1

== Honours ==
Red Bull Salzburg

- Austrian Bundesliga: 2015–16, 2016–17, 2017–18, 2018–19, 2019–20, 2020–21
- Austrian Cup: 2015–16, 2016–17, 2018–19, 2019–20, 2020–21

AEK Athens

- Super League Greece: 2022–23
- Greek Cup: 2022–23

Individual

- Austrian Bundesliga Goalkeeper of the Year: 2014–15
- Austrian Bundesliga Team of the Year: 2018–19
