= Spyros Skondras =

Greek footballer

Personal information
- Date of birth: 6 April 2001 (age 25)
- Place of birth: Agrinio, Greece
- Height: 1.84 m (6 ft 1/2 in)
- Position: Winger

Team information
- Current team: Ergotelis

Youth career
- Panetolikos

Senior career*
Years	Team	Apps	(Gls)
2020–2022	Panetolikos	0	(0)
2021–2022	→ Episkopi (loan)	20	(0)
2022–2024	AEK Athens B	32	(2)
2024–2025	Panachaiki	8	(0)
2025–2026	Hellas Syros	1	(0)
2026	Panargiakos	7	(0)
2026–	Ergotelis		
- * Club domestic league appearances and goals as of 21 April 2026

Spyros Skondras (Greek: Σπύρος Σκόνδρας; born 6 April 2001) is a Greek professional footballer who plays as a winger for Gamma Ethniki club Ergotelis.
