= Dimitrios Metaxas =

Greek footballer

Personal information
- Date of birth: 16 December 2003 (age 22)
- Place of birth: Aliveri, Euboea, Greece
- Height: 1.78 m (5 ft 10 in)
- Position: Midfielder

Team information
- Current team: Athens Kallithea
- Number: 21

Youth career
- 2017–2018: Asteras Tripolis

Senior career*
Years	Team	Apps	(Gls)
2021–2024	Volos	33	(0)
2024	AC Oulu	24	(1)
2025–	Athens Kallithea	32	(0)

International career^{‡}
2022–2024	Greece U21	12	(0)
- * Club domestic league appearances and goals as of 21 April 2026 ‡ National team caps and goals as of 15 October 2024

Dimitrios Metaxas (Greek: Δημήτριος Μεταξάς; born 16 December 2003) is a Greek professional footballer who plays as a midfielder for Super League 2 club Athens Kallithea.

== Career ==
=== Tamynaikos ===
Metaxas joined Tamynaikos in 2019. He scored his first goal in a 1–2 loss to Hersonissos. Two weeks later he scored the equaliser in a league match against Iraklis Psachna.

=== Volos ===
Metaxas joined Volos for an undisclosed fee in July 2021. On 18 October 2022, he scored his first goal for the club in a 4–0 win over Ionikos in Kypello Eladas. He made 33 appearances in Super League Greece for Volos, before leaving the club in the early 2024.

=== AC Oulu ===
On 10 February 2024, Metaxas moved to Finland after signing with Veikkausliiga side AC Oulu on a two-year deal with an option to extend for one more. On 17 February 2024, Metaxas debuted with his new club, in a Finnish League Cup match against Vaasan Palloseura (VPS). He scored his first goal in the league on 27 April 2024, in a 2–1 defeat against VPS. His contract was terminated on 31 January 2025.

=== Athens Kallithea ===
On 31 January 2025, he returned to Greece and signed with Athens Kallithea in Greek Super League.

== Career statistics ==
As of 31 January 2025

Club	Season	League			Cup (Note: Includes Greek Cup and Suomen Cup)		Europe		Other		Total	
Club	Season	Division	Apps	Goals	Apps	Goals	Apps	Goals	Apps	Goals	Apps	Goals
Volos	2021–22	Super League Greece	6	0	1	0	—		—		7	0
Volos	2022–23	Super League Greece	21	0	3	1	—		—		24	1
Volos	2023–24	Super League Greece	6	0	1	0	—		—		7	0
Volos	Total		33	0	5	1	0	0	0	0	38	1
AC Oulu	2024	Veikkausliiga	24	1	3	0	—		2 (Note: Includes Finnish League Cup)	0	29	1
Athens Kallithea	2024–25	Super League Greece	0	0	0	0	–		–		0	0
Career total			57	1	8	1	0	0	2	0	67	2
