= Paolo Fernandes =

Spanish footballer

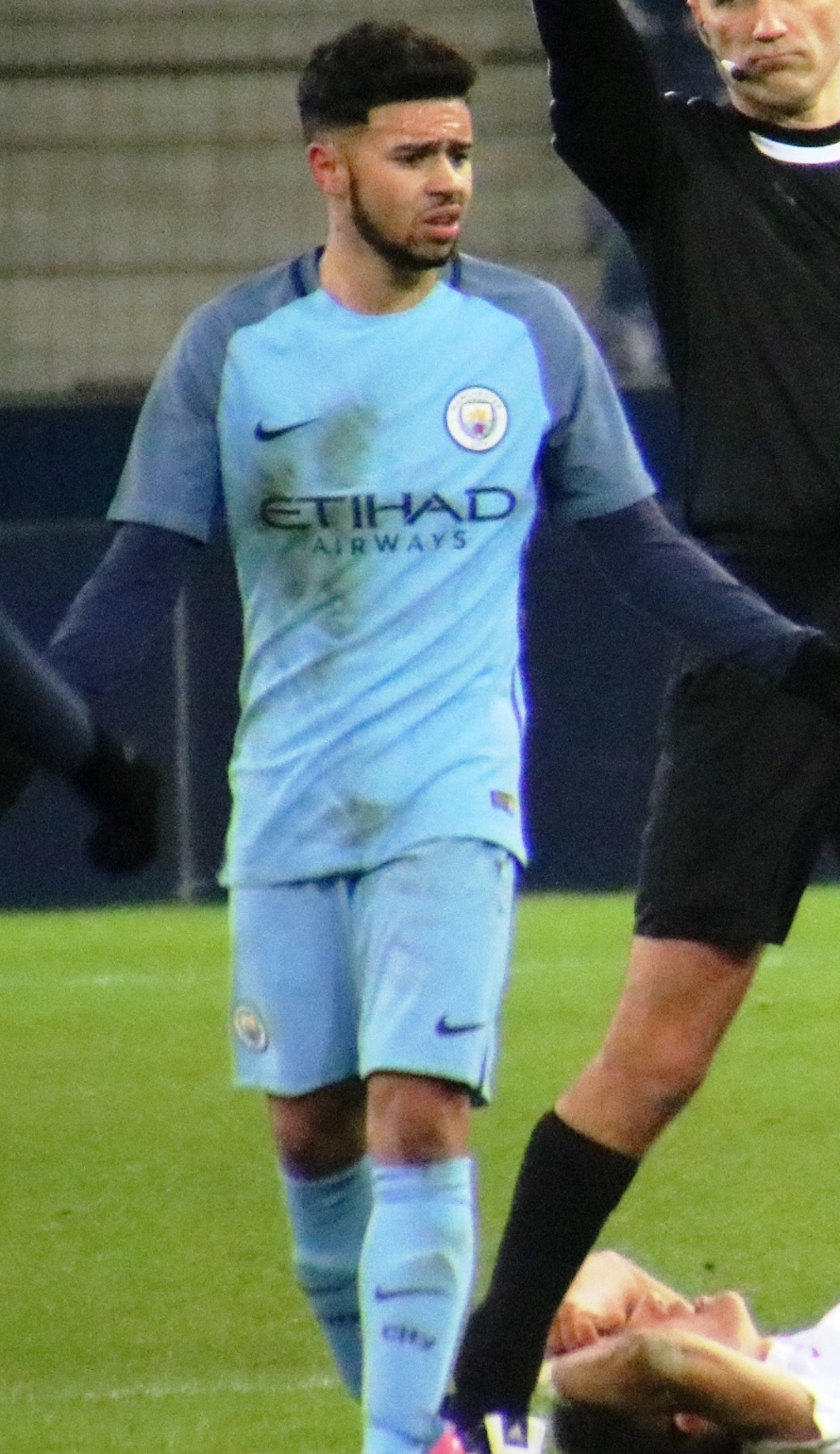
- Fernandes with Manchester City in 2017

Personal information
- Full name: Paolo Fernandes Cantin
- Date of birth: 19 August 1998 (age 28)
- Place of birth: Zaragoza, Spain
- Height: 1.67 m (5 ft 6 in)
- Positions: Winger; attacking midfielder

Team information
- Current team: Alanyaspor (on loan from AEK Athens)
- Number: 22

Youth career
- 2010–2013: Zaragoza
- 2013–2017: Manchester City

Senior career*
Years	Team	Apps	(Gls)
2017–2020	Manchester City	0	(0)
2017–2019	→ NAC Breda (loan)	33	(2)
2019–2020	→ Perugia (loan)	13	(0)
2020–2021	Castellón	10	(0)
2021–2022	Volos	31	(6)
2022–	AEK Athens	41	(2)
2022	→ Volos (loan)	9	(2)
2025–2026	→ Al-Khaleej (loan)	28	(4)
2026–	→ Alanyaspor (loan)	0	(0)
- * Club domestic league appearances and goals as of 10 May 2026

Paolo Fernandes Cantin (born 19 August 1998) is a Spanish professional footballer who plays for Turkish Süper Lig club Alanyaspor, on loan from Greek Super League side AEK Athens. Mainly a left winger, he also plays as an attacking midfielder.

== Club career ==
=== Manchester City ===
Born in Zaragoza, Aragon to a Capeverdean father, Fernandes started his career at Real Zaragoza. In 2013, aged 15, he joined Manchester City after being invited to train for the squad. Zaragoza later claimed to the Royal Spanish Football Federation that the player was not allowed to join City, and the English club agreed to pay a compensation fee for the move (rumoured to be € 180,000); despite still training at City, he was only registered in August 2014 when he reached the age of 16.

Initially assigned to the under-18 squad, Fernandes progressed through the EDS and represented the under-21s and under-23s. With the latter side he scored 11 goals in 22 appearances in the 2016–17 Premier League 2 Division 1.

==== Loan to NAC Breda ====
On 24 June 2017, Fernandes, alongside Thierry Ambrose and fellow compatriot Pablo Marí were loaned to Eredivisie side Breda. He made his professional debut on 12 August, coming on as a half-time substitute for Giovanni Korte in a 1–4 away loss against Vitesse.

Fernandes scored his first professional goal on 3 December 2017, netting his team's third in a 3–1 home win against Excelsior. The following 12 July, his loan was extended for a further season, but found game time limited, contributing just eight league appearances.

==== Loan to Perugia ====
On 17 July 2019, Fernandes joined Serie B side Perugia on loan for the 2019–20 season. He appeared in 16 league matches overall, totalling ten starts.

=== Castellón ===
Fernandes joined Segunda División newcomers Castellón on 3 September 2020, signing a three-year contract.

=== Volos ===
On 29 June 2021, Fernandes signed for Greek Super League club Volos on undisclosed contract terms. On 19 September 2021, he scored his first goal for the club in a 3–1 away win against Apollon Smyrnis.

=== AEK Athens ===
On 15 September 2022, Fernandes signed a four-year contract with Greek Super League club AEK Athens, and was loaned back to Volos until the next transfer window. The signing was made official on 1 January 2023.

==== Loans to Al-Khaleej, Alanyaspor ====
On 4 August 2025, Fernandes joined Saudi Pro League club Al-Khaleej on a season long loan deal. On 28 August 2026, Fernandes was once again loaned out, this time to Süper Lig club Alanyaspor on a season long loan, with an option to buy.

== Career statistics ==
As of match played 10 November 2024

Club	Season	League			Cup		Continental		Other		Total	
Club	Season	Division	Apps	Goals	Apps	Goals	Apps	Goals	Apps	Goals	Apps	Goals
NAC Breda (loan)	2017–18	Eredivisie	25	2	0	0	—		—		25	2
NAC Breda (loan)	2018–19	Eredivisie	8	0	1	0	—		—		9	0
NAC Breda (loan)	Total		33	2	1	0	—		—		34	2
Perugia (loan)	2019–20	Serie B	13	0	3	0	—		—		16	0
Castellón	2020–21	Segunda División	10	0	2	1	—		—		12	1
Volos	2021–22	Superleague Greece	27	5	3	1	—		—		30	6
Volos	2022–23	Superleague Greece	4	1	0	0	—		—		4	1
Volos	Total		31	6	3	1	—		—		34	7
Volos (loan)	2022–23	Superleague Greece	9	2	2	0	—		—		11	2
AEK Athens	2022–23	Superleague Greece	14	1	5	1	—		—		19	2
AEK Athens	2023–24	Superleague Greece	8	0	1	0	—		—		9	0
AEK Athens	2024–25	Superleague Greece	3	1	1	0	3	0	—		7	1
AEK Athens	Total		25	2	7	1	3	0	0	0	35	3
Career total			121	12	18	3	3	0	0	0	142	15

== Honours ==
AEK Athens

- Super League Greece: 2022–23
- Greek Cup: 2022–23
