= Gerasimos Mitoglou =

Greek footballer

Personal information
- Full name: Gerasimos Mitoglou
- Date of birth: 20 October 1999 (age 27)
- Place of birth: Athens, Greece
- Height: 1.95 m (6 ft 5 in)
- Position: Centre-back

Team information
- Current team: Atromitos
- Number: 24

Senior career*
| Years | Team | Apps | (Gls) |
| 2017–2019 | Agrotikos Asteras | 38 | (1) |
| 2019–2021 | Volos | 26 | (1) |
| 2021–2026 | AEK Athens | 59 | (5) |
| 2026– | Atromitos | 12 | (1) |
- * Club domestic league appearances and goals as of 6 September 2026

Gerasimos Mitoglou (Greek: Γεράσιμος Μήτογλου; born 20 October 1999) is a Greek professional footballer who plays as a centre-back for Super League club Atromitos.

== Career ==
=== Volos ===
On 9 July 2019, Mitoglou joined Volos on a free transfer.

On 15 February 2021, he signed a contract extension, running until the summer of 2024. On 10 April 2021, he scored his first professional goal in a 3–1 home win against Panetolikos.

=== AEK Athens ===
On 25 May 2021, Mitoglou signed for AEK Athens, following an announcement from Volos on their social media, saying that they had reached an agreement with AEK to sell Mitoglou to them, on a four-year contract until June 2025. On 11 June 2021, the four-year contract became official. On 31 October 2021, he scored his first goal with the club in a vital 2–1 home win game against Aris Thessaloniki.

== Personal life ==
His father, Dimitrios, is a former professional footballer, while his brother, Dinos is an international basketball player.

== Career statistics ==
=== Club ===
As of match played 12 January 2025

| Club | Season | League | | | Greek Cup | | Europe | | Total | |
| Club | Season | Division | Apps | Goals | Apps | Goals | Apps | Goals | Apps | Goals |
|---|---|---|---|---|---|---|---|---|---|---|
| Volos | 2019–20 | Super League Greece | 4 | 0 | 1 | 0 | — | | 5 | 0 |
| Volos | 2020–21 | Super League Greece | 22 | 1 | 4 | 2 | — | | 26 | 3 |
| Volos | Total | | 26 | 1 | 5 | 2 | — | | 31 | 3 |
| AEK Athens | 2021–22 | Super League Greece | 23 | 1 | 3 | 0 | 0 | 0 | 26 | 1 |
| AEK Athens | 2022–23 | Super League Greece | 8 | 1 | 7 | 0 | — | | 15 | 1 |
| AEK Athens | 2023–24 | Super League Greece | 13 | 0 | 2 | 0 | 1 (Note: Appearances in UEFA Europa League) | 0 | 15 | 0 |
| AEK Athens | 2024–25 | Super League Greece | 0 | 0 | 0 | 0 | 0 (Note: Appearances in UEFA Conference League) | 0 | 0 | 0 |
| AEK Athens | 2025–26 | Super League Greece | 0 | 0 | 0 | 0 | 0 | 0 | 0 | 0 |
| Total | | Super League Greece | 44 | 2 | 12 | 0 | 1 | 0 | 57 | 2 |
| Career total | | | 70 | 3 | 17 | 2 | 1 | 0 | 88 | 5 |

== Honours ==
AEK Athens

- Super League Greece: 2022–23
- Greek Cup: 2022–23
