= İhsan Poyraz =

Austrian-Turkish footballer

Personal information
- Date of birth: 5 March 1988 (age 38)
- Place of birth: Vienna, Austria
- Height: 1.90 m (6 ft 3 in)
- Position: Goalkeeper

Youth career
- 1999–2000: SV Wienerberg
- 2000–2002: Team Wiener Linien
- 2002–2008: LASK Linz

Senior career*
Years	Team	Apps	(Gls)
2008–2009	LASK Linz	0	(0)
2009–2012	SC Wiener Neustadt	4	(0)
2009–2010	→ SV Wienerberg (loan)	18	(0)
2012–2014	Manisaspor	6	(0)

International career
2006–2007	Austria U19	6	(0)
- * Club domestic league appearances and goals

İhsan Poyraz (born 5 March 1988) is an Austrian retired football player. He also has Turkish citizenship.
