= Georgios Theocharis (footballer) =

Greek footballer

Personal information
- Date of birth: 30 June 2002 (age 24)
- Place of birth: Greece
- Height: 1.87 m (6 ft 1 1/2 in)
- Position: Goalkeeper

Team information
- Current team: AO Nea Artaki

Youth career
- 2015–2020: AEK Athens

Senior career*
Years	Team	Apps	(Gls)
2020–2025	AEK Athens	0	(0)
2021–2025	AEK Athens B	29	(0)
2025–	AO Nea Artaki	0	(0)
- * Club domestic league appearances and goals as of 10:04, 12 May 2025 (UTC)

Georgios Theocharis (Greek: Γεώργιος Θεοχάρης; born 30 June 2002) is a Greek professional footballer who plays as a goalkeeper for Gamma Ethniki club AO Nea Artaki.

== Honours ==
AEK Athens

- Super League: 2022–23
- Greek Cup: 2022–23
