= Ehsan Hajsafi =

Iranian footballer (born 1990)

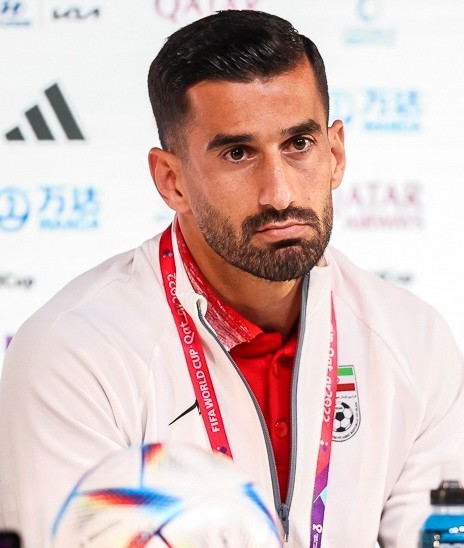
- Hajsafi with Iran in 2022

Personal information
- Full name: Ehsan Hajsafi
- Date of birth: 25 February 1990 (age 36)
- Place of birth: Kashan, Iran
- Height: 1.76 m (5 ft 9 in)
- Position: Left-back

Team information
- Current team: Sepahan
- Number: 28

Youth career
- 2000–2006: Sepahan

Senior career*
Years	Team	Apps	(Gls)
2006–2015	Sepahan	205	(27)
2011–2012	→ Tractor (loan)	45	(9)
2015–2016	FSV Frankfurt	27	(2)
2016–2017	Sepahan	25	(5)
2017–2018	Panionios	14	(1)
2018	Olympiacos	6	(1)
2018–2021	Tractor	69	(7)
2021	Sepahan	13	(1)
2021–2025	AEK Athens	91	(3)
2025–	Sepahan	31	(6)

International career^{‡}
2005–2006	Iran U17	6	(2)
2007–2008	Iran U20	8	(2)
2007–2011	Iran U23	12	(1)
2008–	Iran (Note: Hajsafi has an additional cap awarded by the Iranian Football Association for the match vs. Iraq on 18 March 2017, but it has not been recognized by FIFA.)	147	(7)
Medal record
Representing Iran
WAFF Championship
Winner	2008 Iran
CAFA Nations Cup
Winner	2023 Kyrgyzstan – Uzbekistan	Team
- * Club domestic league appearances and goals as of 27 February 2026 ‡ National team caps and goals as of 29 September 2026

Ehsan Hajsafi (Persian: احسان حاج‌صفی; born 25 February 1990) is an Iranian professional footballer who plays for Sepahan and the Iran national team.

Hajsafi is regarded as a utility player, being able to play as a winger, left-back or defensive midfielder.

In 2009, Hajsafi was selected by Goal.com as the most promising player in Asian football. Hajsafi has represented Iran at the 2014, 2018, 2022 and 2026 editions of the FIFA World Cup, as well as the 2011, 2015, 2019 and 2023 AFC Asian Cup tournaments.

== Club career ==
=== Sepahan ===
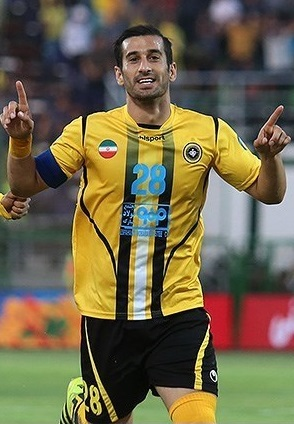
Ehsan Hajsafi with Sepahan in 2016

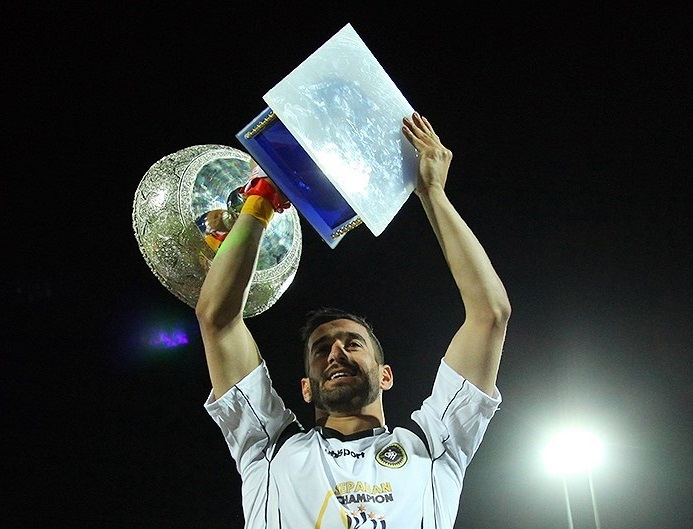
Ehsan Hajsafi - Iran Pro League victory celebration with Sepahan in 2015

Hajsafi started his career in Zob Ahan in 2000 and left the club in 2006, joining Sepahan. He was found at the Sepahan youth academy by Luka Bonačić. Hajsafi played two matches from the start in the 2007 FIFA Club World Cup and has been a regular for Sepahan during recent seasons. Sepahan came second in the 2007 AFC Champions League.

Ehsan takes set pieces for Sepahan and plays both in central and left midfield, having scored six league goals for Sepahan in the 2007–08 season. In the last game of the league match against Persepolis, Hajsafi scored a goal for Sepahan that could have granted Sepahan the title, but Persepolis scored the vital winning goal in stoppage time to win the title. He continued to perform well and scored wonderful goals for Sepahan in the 2008–09 season. He was tested as the left back in the 2009–10 season when Sepahan won the league, and extended his contract with Sepahan for two another years.

==== Tractor (loan) ====
In June 2011, Hajsafi signed a one and a half year loan conscription contract with Tractor, reuniting him with former coach Amir Ghalenoei. Tractor finished second in the league, their best results in club history. His contract with Tractor ended in January 2012, and he returned to Sepahan.

==== Return to Sepahan ====
Hajsafi returned to Sepahan in January 2012, beginning this time with coach Zlatko Kranjčar. He won the Hazfi Cup with the team and extended his contract with Sepahan for another two seasons at the end of the season. In August 2014 after the end of his contract Hajsafi was close to signing with Championship side Fulham, but the deal fell through due to work permit issues. Hajsafi returned to Iran and extended his contract for another two seasons with Sepahan.

=== FSV Frankfurt ===
On 30 August 2015, Hajsafi joined FSV Frankfurt in the 2. Bundesliga on a two-year contract. He made his league debut on 13 September 2015 as a second-half substitute against Eintracht Braunschweig. He made his first start a week later as a left-back on 20 September in a 1–0 league win over MSV Duisburg. Hajsafi quickly established himself as the set-piece taker. Hajsafi scored his first goal for FSV Frankfurt on 2 March 2016 in a 3–3 draw against MSV Duisburg. On 13 March 2016, he scored from 50 yards against SC Freiburg.

After FSV was relegated to the 3. Liga, the club announced that they had annulled the contract of Hajsafi and he was a free agent and could sign with any club.

=== Panionios ===
On 24 June 2017, Hajsafi signed a two-year contract with Super League Greece side Panionios. He is set to team up with fellow countryman Masoud Shojaei at Panionios. Hajsafi became the third Iranian in recent years to play for the club.

Hajsafi made his first appearance for the club on 13 July 2017 in a second round UEFA Europa League qualifying match against Slovenian club Gorica. On 20 August 2017, on his league debut with Panionios, Hajsafi recorded an assist from a corner kick.

=== Olympiacos ===
On 29 December 2017, after six months with Panionios, Hajisafi reached an agreement with Greek side Olympiacos, signing a 3 1/2-year contract for a transfer fee of €600,000. His contract, was worth €400,000 per year. The 27-year-old player was the team's first transfer in the January window. On 11 February 2018, he made his debut with the club in the Super League Greece as a starter, scoring a late goal as he bundled home the rebound to seal a point for Olympiacos when Atromitos keeper Andreas Gianniotis saved Uros Djurdjevic's penalty-kick.

=== Tractor ===
On 2 September 2018, Hajisafi returned to Tractor on a three-year contract.

=== AEK Athens ===
On 3 August 2021, Hajsafi returned to Greece and signed for AEK Athens. On 24 October 2021, he came in as a late substitute and sealed a 3–1 away win against Volos, after a magnificent run from Steven Zuber. Hajsafi flourished as left back and quickly established himself within the team. After the coach of AEK, Argyris Giannikis was fired, interim manager Sokratis Ofrydopoulos tested Hajsafi as a midfielder. Ehsan Hajsafi scored the first goal in AEK's 3–0 win against PAS Giannina after an assist from Krychowiak. AEK finished 5th in the league, but the next season under the orders of Matias Almeyda would turn out to be historic. Hajsafi was the only fit left back of AEK Athens after the surgery of his compatriot, Milad Mohammadi in the World Cup. He played in nearly every game and he was characterized by his calmness on the ball and his solid defending. On 14 May 2023, Hajsafi assisted Zuber in AEK's 4–0 win over Volos, the match which confirmed AEK won the championship. A few days later he also started in the cup final against PAOK, where AEK won 2–0 and clinched their third ever double. Hajsafi renewed his contract with AEK Athens for another year. I the following season, Hajsafi participated in the group stage of Europa league. On 21 September 2023, Hajsafi started in AEK's enormous win in Brighton and he delivered 2 assists from set pieces.

== International career ==
Hajsafi competed for the Iran U17 national team at the 2006 AFC Youth Championship. He later went on to appear for the U-20 and U-23 teams.

On 25 May 2008, Hajsafi played his first A national team match for the senior national team in a friendly game against Zambia. He shone in his debut with two brilliant assists in Iran's 3–2 win at Azadi Stadium. On 2 June, he then played in Iran's 2010 FIFA World Cup World Cup qualification against United Arab Emirates at home. In the return game, Hajsafi came on as a substitute to help Iran win the crucial away game.

His first international goal was against Qatar in the 2008 West Asian Football Federation Championship, when Iran went on to win 6–1. He played in 2011 AFC Asian Cup qualification, which was considered the best left side of the competition. He also played for the team in the tournament, in which Iran was eliminated in the Round 16 by South Korea. In March 2014, he was assigned as captain for the first time in his 57th national cap against Kuwait.

On 1 June 2014, he was called into Iran's 2014 FIFA World Cup squad by Carlos Queiroz. He played the full 90 minutes in Iran's first match against Nigeria which ended 0–0. He then started in a match against Argentina and was one of the key players in the match. He substituted in the 88th minute and then Argentina scored their lone goal by Lionel Messi. He also played 63 minutes in Iran's final match against Bosnia and Herzegovina. Iran were eliminated in the group stages. He was called into Iran's 2015 AFC Asian Cup squad on 30 December 2014 by Carlos Queiroz. On 11 January 2015, in Iran's opening match of the tournament, Hajsafi scored the first goal and was named man of the match in a 2–0 win against Bahrain.

On 10 August 2017, Hajsafi was banned from the national team, along with teammate Masoud Shojaei, for playing with their club Panionios against Israeli club Maccabi Tel Aviv. His ban was rescinded after posting a religious message on his Instagram. In May 2018 he was named in Iran's preliminary squad for the 2018 World Cup in Russia. He played his 100th international game on 15 November 2018 at the age of 28 in Azadi Stadium against Trinidad and Tobago.

At the 2022 FIFA World Cup, while the Mahsa Amini protests were ongoing, the Iranian team declined to sing the national anthem before their match against England. Hajsafi stated that the team supported the protestors.

On 1 June 2026, he was named in the 26-man squad for the 2026 FIFA World Cup.

== Personal life ==
On 9 February 2026, in the midst of the 2025–2026 Iranian protests, Hajsafi publicly objected to being included on a list of supporters of the 1979 Islamic Revolution by the Ministry of Sport and Youth, ahead of the Revolution's anniversary.

== Career statistics ==
=== International ===
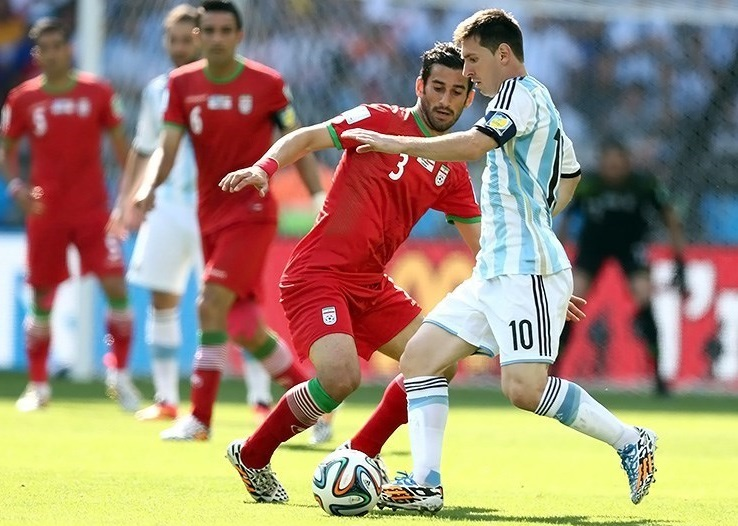
Ehsan Hajsafi playing for Iran against Argentinian star Lionel Messi in 2014 FIFA World Cup

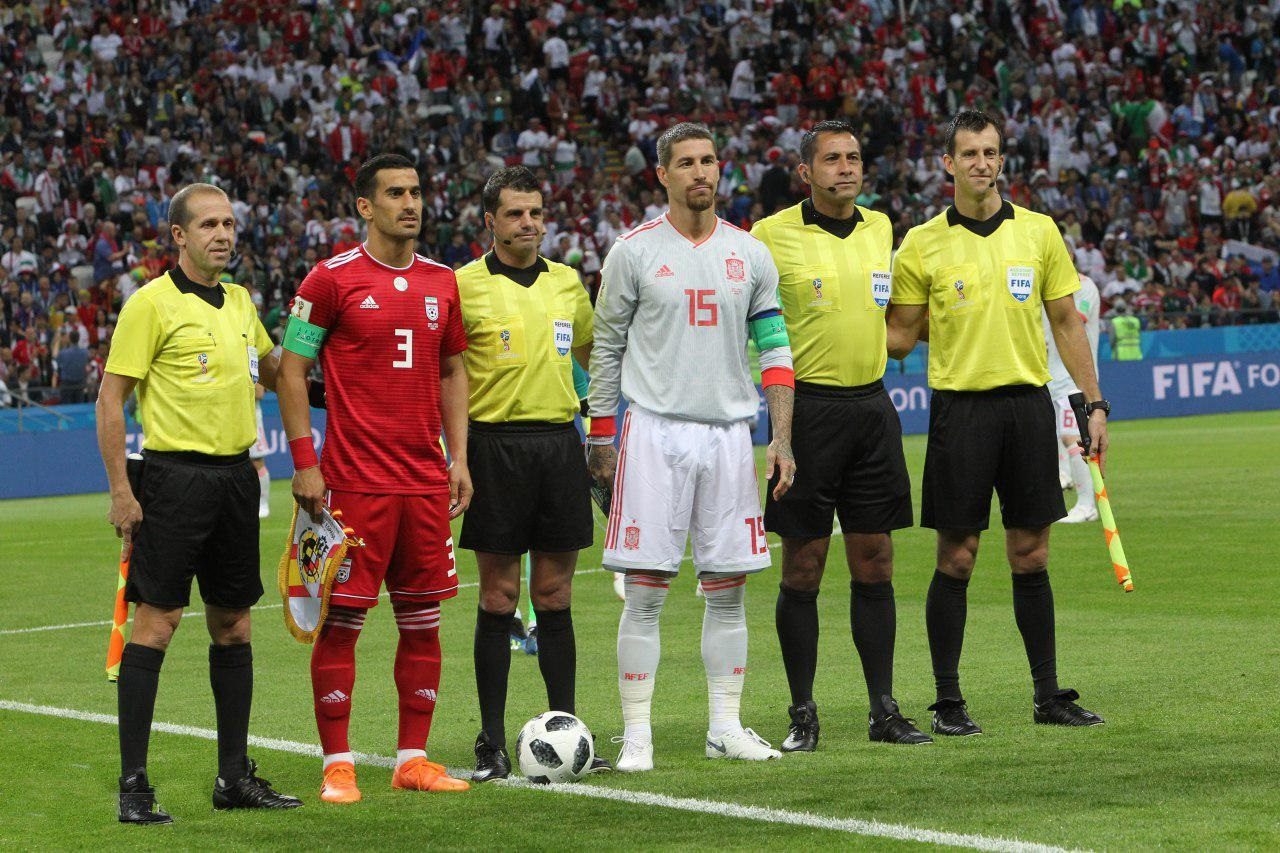
Ehsan Hajsafi and Sergio Ramos, Iran-Spain in 2018 FIFA World Cup

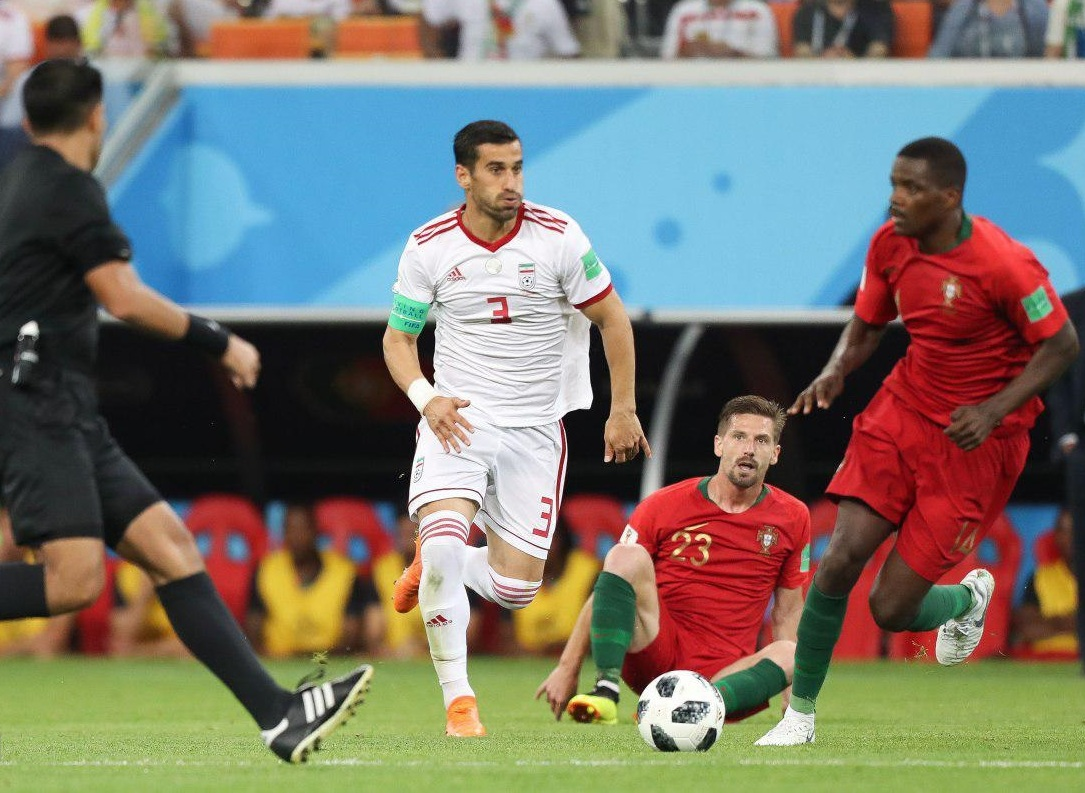
Hajsafi captaining Iran, against Portugal in 2018 FIFA World Cup

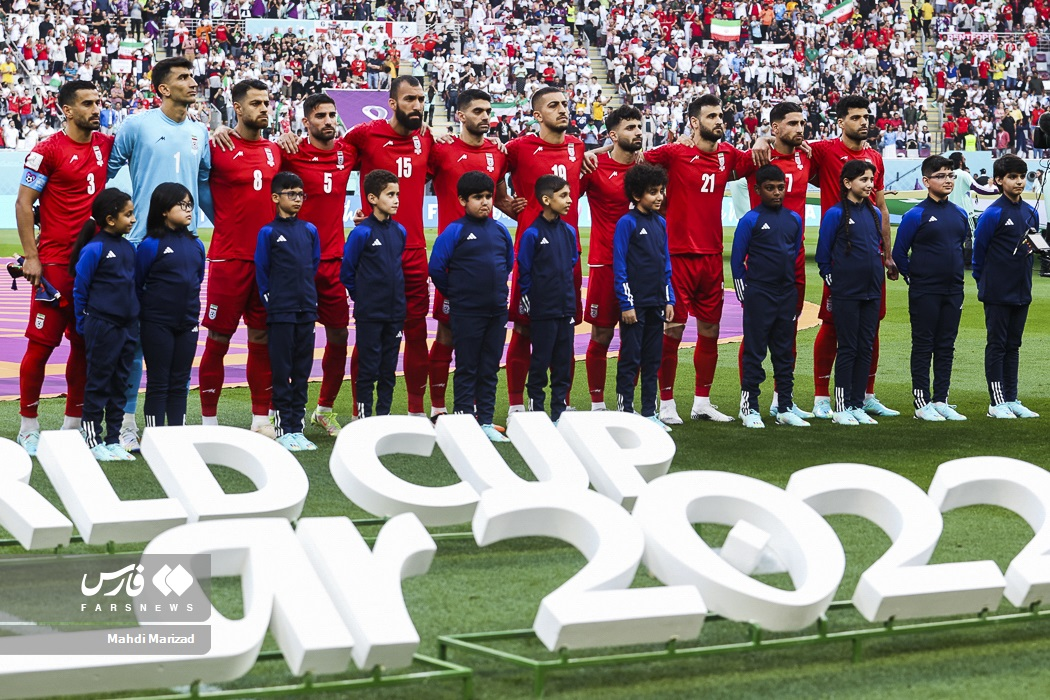
Hajsafi captaining Iran, against England in 2022 FIFA World Cup

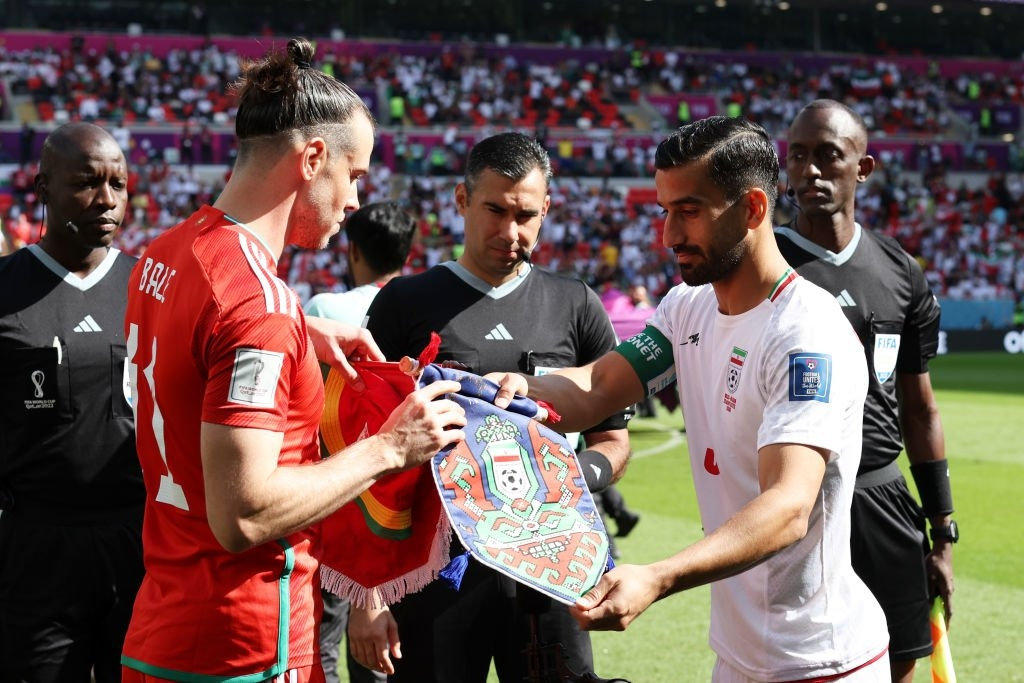
Ehsan Hajsafi and Gareth Bale, Iran-Wales in 2022 FIFA World Cup

As of match played 29 September 2026

Appearances and goals by national team and year
National team	Year	Apps	Goals
Iran	2008	9	1
Iran	2009	10	1
Iran	2010	10	0
Iran	2011	11	0
Iran	2012	11	0
Iran	2013	5	0
Iran	2014	10	1
Iran	2015	10	1
Iran	2016	6	2
Iran	2017	7 (8) (Note: Hajsafi's national cap against Iraq on 18 March 2017 is recognized by FFIRI, but it has not been recognized by FIFA.)	0
Iran	2018	11	0
Iran	2019	9	0
Iran	2020	2	0
Iran	2021	5	1
Iran	2022	8	0
Iran	2023	11	0
Iran	2024	7	0
Iran	2025	0	0
Iran	2026	8	0
Total		150	7

Scores and results list Iran's goal tally first, score column indicates score after each Hajsafi goal.

List of international goals scored by Ehsan Hajsafi
No.	Date	Venue	Opponent	Score	Result	Competition
1	11 August 2008	Takhti Stadium, Tehran, Iran	Qatar	4–1	6–1	2008 WAFF Championship
2	28 December 2009	Suhaim bin Hamad, Doha, Qatar	Qatar	2–2	2–3	Qatar Friendship Cup
3	8 June 2014	CT Joaquim Grava, São Paulo, Brazil	Trinidad and Tobago	1–0	2–0	Friendly
4	11 January 2015	Melbourne Rectangular Stadium, Melbourne, Australia	Bahrain	1–0	2–0	2015 AFC Asian Cup
5	24 March 2016	Azadi Stadium, Tehran, Iran	India	1–0	4–0	2018 FIFA World Cup qualification
6	24 March 2016	Azadi Stadium, Tehran, Iran	India	3–0	4–0	2018 FIFA World Cup qualification
7	16 November 2021	King Abdullah II Stadium, Amman, Jordan	Syria	2–0	3–0	2022 FIFA World Cup qualification

== Honours ==
Sepahan

- Persian Gulf Pro League: 2009–10, 2010–11, 2014–15
- Hazfi Cup: 2005–06, 2006–07, 2012–13
- AFC Champions League: runner-up 2007

Tractor

- Hazfi Cup: 2019–20

AEK Athens

- Super League Greece: 2022–23
- Greek Cup: 2022–23

Iran

- WAFF Championship: 2008
- CAFA Nations Cup: 2023

Individual

- Persian Gulf Pro League Young Player of the Year: 2007–08
- Persian Gulf Pro League top assist provider: 2009–10, 2011–12, 2016–17
- Persian Gulf Pro League Defender of the Year: 2009–10, 2011–12
- Persian Gulf Pro League Team of the Year: 2011–12, 2016–17
- Super League Greece Team of the Season: 2022–23

== See also ==
- List of men's footballers with 100 or more international caps
