= 2020 Greek Football Cup final =

2020 Greek Cup final
- Match poster
- Event: 2019–20 Greek Football Cup
AEK Athens	Olympiacos
0	1
- Date: 12 September 2020
- Venue: Panthessaliko Stadium, Volos
- Man of the Match: Lazar Ranđelović (Olympiacos)
- Referee: Björn Kuipers (Netherlands)
- Attendance: Behind closed doors
- Weather: Fair; 21 °C (70 °F); 64% humidity

The 2020 Greek Cup final was the 76th final of the Greek Cup. It took place on 12 September 2020 at Panthessaliko Stadium. The contesting teams were AEK Athens and Olympiacos. It was AEK Athens' twenty fifth Greek Cup final and fifth consecutive, of their 96-year history and Olympiacos' fortieth Greek Cup final in their 95 years of existence. The final was originally scheduled for 26 July and was postponed to 30 August because of Olympiacos' pressure in HFF to change the stadium from Georgios Kamaras Stadium to Olympic Stadium and after the refusal of the Hellenic Police in the first stadium. The final was rescheduled for 30 August in the Olympic Stadium, but it was postponed again because 2 days before the game Olympiacos' player, Maximiliano Lovera was tested positive for COVID-19. The final was rescheduled again for 12 September at Panthessaliko Stadium. Due to the delay of the match, the teams had to compete without the players acquired from the 2020 summer transfer period, by decision of the UEFA. With their defeat, AEK Athens achieved negative record of four consecutive lost Cup finals, surpassing that of Panathinaikos that lost three straight Cup finals from 1997 to 1999.

== Venue ==
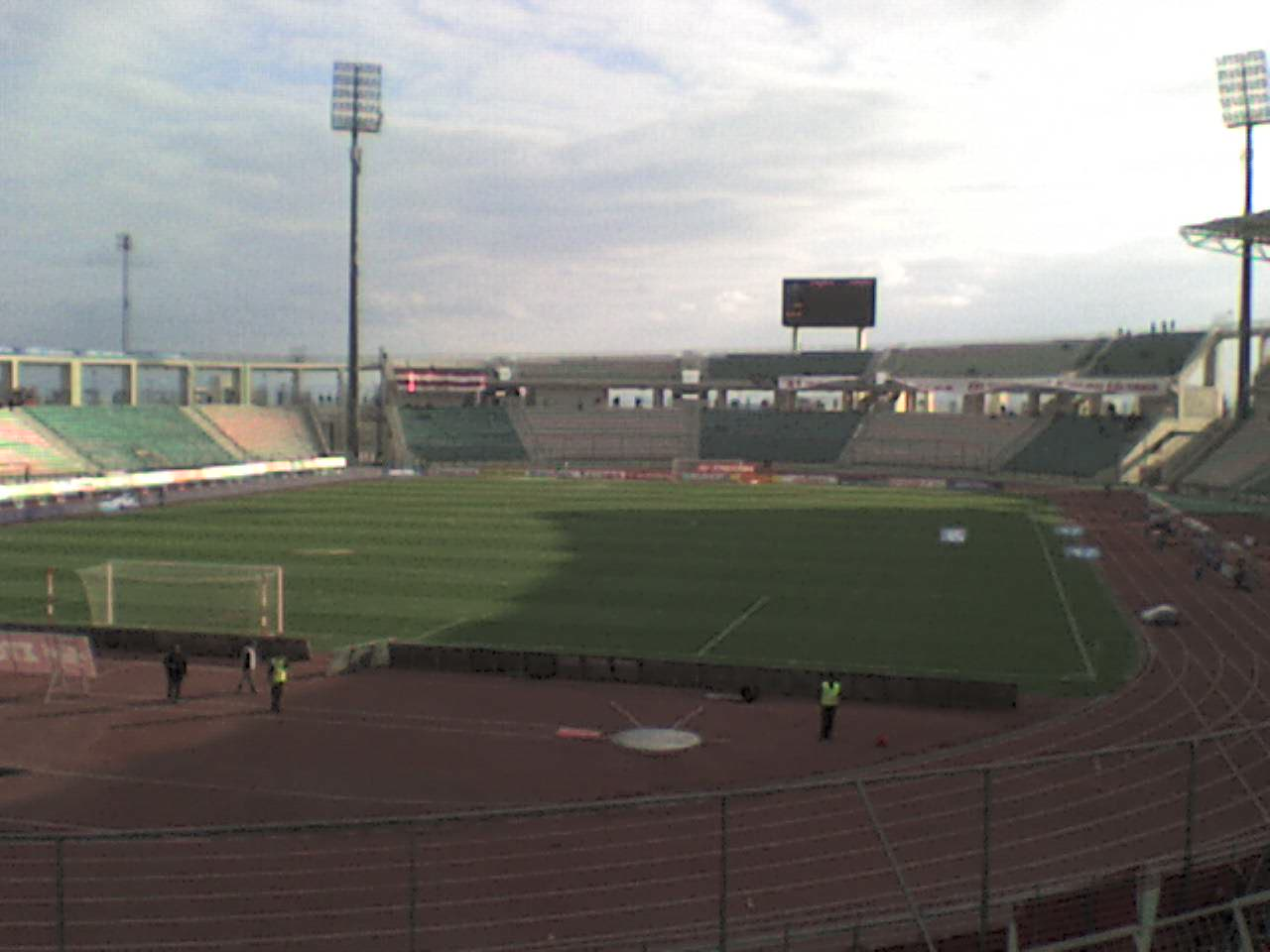
Panthessaliko Stadium.

This was the third Greek Cup final held at Panthessaliko Stadium after the 2007 and 2017 finals.

Panthessaliko Stadium was built in 2004. The stadium is used as a venue for Niki Volos and Volos. Its current capacity is 22,189.

== Background ==
AEK Athens had reached the Greek Cup final twenty-four times, winning fourteen of them. The last time that they had won the Cup was in 2016 (2–1 against Olympiacos). The last time that they had played in a final was in 2019, where they had lost to PAOK by 1–0.

Olympiacos had reached the Greek Cup final thirty-eight times, winning twenty-seven of them. The last time they had won the Cup was in 2015 (3–1 against Skoda Xanthi). The last time that had played in a final was in 2019, where they had lost to AEK Athens by 2–1.

The two teams had met each other in a Cup final six times in the 1953, 1956, 2002, 2006, 2009 and 2016 finals.

== Route to the final ==
AEK Athens				Round	Olympiacos			
Opponent	Agg.	1st leg	2nd leg		Opponent	Agg.	1st leg	2nd leg
Asteras Tripolis	3–1	1–1 (A)	2–0 (H)	Round of 16	Kalamata	6–1	2–0 (A)	4–1 (H)
Panetolikos	5–1	1–1 (A)	4–0 (H)	Quarter-finals	Lamia	3–2	0–0 (A)	3–2 (H)
Aris	3–2	2–1 (H)	2–2 (a.e.t.) (A)	Semi-finals	PAOK	4–3	2–3 (A)	2–0 (H)

== Match ==
=== Details ===
12 September 2020
21:00 EEST

AEK Athens	0–1	Olympiacos
	Report	Ranđelović 9'

Panthessaliko Stadium, Volos
Attendance: Behind closed doors
Referee: Björn Kuipers (Netherlands)

AEK Athens	Olympiacos

GK	16	(Greece) Panagiotis Tsintotas
RB	2	(Greece) Michalis Bakakis		(substituted off) 62'
CB	24	(Greece) Stratos Svarnas
CB	19	(Ukraine) Dmytro Chyhrynskyi
LB	3	(Portugal) Hélder Lopes	(yellow card) 90+6'
DM	8	(Portugal) André Simões	(yellow card) 29'	(substituted off) 80'
CM	6	(Serbia) Nenad Krstičić	(yellow card) 90+5'
CM	20	(Greece) Petros Mantalos (c)	(yellow card) 65'
RW	7	(Italy) Daniele Verde		(substituted off) 62'
LW	10	(Croatia) Marko Livaja	(yellow card) 83'
CF	18	(Portugal) Nélson Oliveira
Substitutes:
GK	30	(Greece) Georgios Athanasiadis
DF	15	(Slovenia) Žiga Laci
DF	31	(Greece) Konstantinos Stamoulis
DF	27	(Portugal) Paulinho		(substituted on) 62'
MF	44	(Bosnia and Herzegovina) Anel Šabanadžović
MF	70	(Greece) Giannis Fivos Botos
FW	14	(Greece) Christos Albanis		(substituted on) 62'
FW	53	(Greece) Theodosis Macheras		(substituted on) 80'
FW	52	(Greece) Efthymis Christopoulos
Manager:
(Italy) Massimo Carrera

GK	88	(Greece) Konstantinos Tzolakis
RB	18	(Brazil) Bruno
CB	66	(Senegal) Pape Abou Cissé
CB	24	(Senegal) Ousseynou Ba
LB	35	(Greece) Vasilis Torosidis (c)	(yellow card) 55'	(substituted off) 79'
CM	4	(Guinea) Mady Camara
CM	5	(Greece) Andreas Bouchalakis
RM	97	(Serbia) Lazar Ranđelović
LM	19	(Greece) Georgios Masouras	(yellow card) 84'
AM	28	(France) Mathieu Valbuena		(substituted off) 76'
CF	11	(Morocco) Youssef El-Arabi		(substituted off) 90+1'
Substitutes:
GK	16	(France) Bobby Allain
GK	44	(Greece) Ilias Karargyris
DF	3	(Portugal) Rúben Semedo		(substituted on) 79'
DF	34	(Greece) Avraam Papadopoulos
MF	26	(Portugal) Cafú	(yellow card) 89'	(substituted on) 76'
MF	90	(Greece) Vasilios Sourlis
ΜF	7	(Greece) Kostas Fortounis		(substituted on) 90+1'
FW	2	(Algeria) Hillal Soudani
FW	99	(Egypt) Ahmed Hassan
Manager:
(Portugal) Pedro Martins

Man of the Match:
(Serbia) Lazar Ranđelović (Olympiacos)

Assistant referees:
Sander van Roekel (Netherlands)
Erwin Zeinstra (Netherlands)
Fourth official:
Rob Dieperink (Netherlands)
Video assistant referee:
Pol van Boekel (Netherlands)
Assistant video assistant referee:
Chrysoula Kourompylia (West Attica)

Match rules

- 90 minutes
- 30 minutes of extra time if necessary
- Penalty shootout if scores still level
- Nine named substitutes, of which up to five may be used at maximum three times, with a sixth allowed in extra time.
