= 2019–20 AEK Athens F.C. season =

AEK Athens
2019–20 season
- Chairman: Evangelos Aslanidis
- Manager: Miguel Cardoso (until 26 August); Nikos Kostenoglou (until 8 December); Massimo Carrera
- Stadium: Athens Olympic Stadium
- Super League: 3rd (After play-offs); 3rd (Regular Season)
- Greek Cup: Runners-up
- UEFA Europa League: Play-off round
- Top goalscorer: League: Nélson Oliveira (14); All: Nélson Oliveira (16)
- Highest home attendance: 32,576 (vs PAOK) (29 September 2019)
- Lowest home attendance: 4,508 (vs Asteras Tripolis) (30 January 2020)
- Average home league attendance: 15,808
- Biggest win: AEK Athens 5–0 Panionios
- Biggest defeat: Olympiacos 3–0 AEK Athens
| Home colours | Away colours | Third colours |

The 2019–20 season was the 96th season in the existence of AEK Athens F.C. and the 59th competitive season and fifth consecutive in the top flight of Greek football. They competed in the Super League, the Greek Cup and the Europa League. The season began on 8 August 2019 and finished on 12 September 2020.

== Kits ==
Supplier: Capelli
Sponsor(s): Pame stoixima
Features: LG Corp

| Home | Away | Third |

== Overview ==
The season started with changes in the entire technical staff of the club. In the summer of 2019, after it had quickly become clear that Manolo Jiménez would not continue on the team's bench, AEK turned to the Iberian market for the position of manager, willing to present a different image on the pitch. They soon ended up with Miguel Cardoso, a manager with controversial career. Transfers included the return of Ognjen Vranješ, the signing of 4 Portuguese, Paulinho, David Simão, Francisco Geraldes and Nélson Oliveira, while Daniele Verde also arrived. Important players, such as Vasilios Lampropoulos, Rodrigo Galo and Anastasios Bakasetas departed, while the loans of Alef, Lucas Boyé and Ezequiel Ponce expired.

The team started their competitive obligations in the third qualifying round of the UEFA Europa League, facing Universitatea Craiova. In the first match at Stadionul Ion Oblemenco that was empty of spectators due to Craiova's suspension for incidents in their previous match, AEK could not threaten the Romanians. The entrance of Livaja on the pitch changed everything with the Croatian forward achieving a goal and an assist forming the final 0–2, which almost sealed the qualification. In the empty Olympic Stadium, due to the punishment of AEK for the incidents of the previous season, the rematch took place that everyone expected to be a walk for the yellow-blacks. AEK took the lead relatively early in the game, but afterwards everyone eased up, with the Romanians not only equalizing in the second half but missing a lot of opportunities to take the lead and chase and qualification. Nevertheless, the score remained at 1–1 and AEK took the qualification. In the first match for the play-offs of the competition against were against the Trabzonspor at home. The stadium was empty of spectators yet again and AEK made dream start with a goal by Livaja in just 4 minutes in the game. However, the Turks equalized later on and as a result the performance of the yellow-blacks collapsed, conceding two more goals, while they could well have easily conceded more. The crushing failure in the match combined with the second consecutive home defeat three days later at the hands of Xanthi, resulted in the sacking of not only Miguel Cardoso and his staff, but of the technical director, Nikos Liberopoulos, as well. The management replaced the Portuguese with the until-then U19 team manager and former player of the club, Nikos Kostenoglou in his third spell at the bench of the team. Thus, AEK went to Şenol Güneş Stadium and after a great performance, dominated their opponents and won by 0–2, losing the qualification on away goals.

With Kostenoglou at the bench, the team showed the feeling of self-preservation and gave a boost in their performance, but the season seemed to be problematic from the start. AEK were presenting last year's problems and could not follow Olympiacos and PAOK in the title race. Thus, at the beginning of December, the management ended their collaboration with Kostenoglou. The new technical director, Ilija Ivić brought in well-known manager, Massimo Carrera, who had previously success with Spartak Moscow. The Italian entered with great appetite and the club showed willingness to strengthen their roster, after acquiring on loan Damian Szymański and Sergio Araujo, in his third spell at the club. AEK were going through a good period in terms of results, ending up in third place before the start of the play-offs.

During that period the crisis COVID-19 pandemic began, and the banning measures of all sporting activities slow down the course of AEK and essentially put the completion of the season in uncertainty. Eventually, the season restarted in early June with the play-offs. There, AEK did not maintain the same image as they did before the interruption and lost the opportunity to finish second in a match that was accompanied by the incomprehensible for many decision of the administration not to object to the match against PAOK since the latter team had knowingly come down with unreviewed health cards of the footballers, which would have resulted in their nullification in this particular match if AEK had done what the law stipulates.

In the Cup, AEK easily passed through Asteras Tripolis in the round of 16 and Panetolikos in the quarter-finals. In the semi-finals, they faced Aris and after an easy 2–1 win in the first at home, which was the last with crowd before the lockdown, went to Kleanthis Vikelidis Stadium three months later. Aris took a 2–0 lead and were close to qualifying, but AEK woke up and scored in the final minutes to take the match into extra time. From there had an easy task as they equalized, missing many chances to win the match, as well. Thus, the yellow-blacks were qualified to the final undefeated and for fourth consecutive year. This time their opponent were Olympiacos who had won the league. The match was originally scheduled for 26 July, but was postponed, due to the pressure of Olympiacos to the HFF in order to change the stadium from Georgios Kamaras Stadium to Olympic Stadium and after the refusal of the Hellenic Police for the first stadium. The final was rescheduled for 30 August in the Olympic Stadium but it was postponed again because two days before the game Olympiacos' player, Maximiliano Lovera, was tested positive for COVID-19 and was rescheduled again for 12 September at Panthessaliko Stadium. Due to the delay of the match, the clubs had to compete without the players acquired from the 2020 summer transfer period, by decision of the UEFA. In the match AEK came into the match strongly, but conceded a goal due to individual mistakes, while afterwards they surrendered and played without a plan. Until the end, the psychologically unprepared AEK were unable to seriously threaten the red and whites and were defeated with 0–1 by an extremely inadequate Olympiacos. That was the fourth consecutive defeat in a Cup final and showed that psychologically the team had started to show big issues in managing high-pressure games.

== Management team ==
| Position | Staff |
|---|---|
| Manager | (Italy) Massimo Carrera |
| Assistant manager | (Italy) Gianluca Colonnello |
| Assistant manager | (Greece) Nikos Panagiotaras |
| Goalkeeping coach | (Greece) Chrysostomos Michailidis |
| Fitness coach | (Greece) Giannis Bouroutzikas |
| Technical director | (Serbia) Ilija Ivić |
| Academy director | (Greece) Ilias Kyriakidis |
| Academy manager | (Greece) Kostas Tsanas |
| U19 Manager | (Greece) Ilias Kalopitas |
| U17 Manager | (Serbia) Ivan Nedeljković |
| Head of Scouting | (Greece) Michalis Kasapis |
| Scout | (Greece) Dimitrios Barbalias |
| Scout | (Greece) Andreas Lagonikakis |
| Scout | (Greece) Christos Maladenis |
| Head of Medical | (Greece) Lakis Nikolaou |

- Source: aekfc.gr

== Players ==
=== Squad information ===
NOTE: The players are the ones that have been announced by the AEK Athens' press release. No edits should be made unless a player arrival or exit is announced. Updated 12 September 2020, 23:59 UTC+3.

| No. | Player | Nat. | Position(s) | Date of birth (Age) | Signed | Previous club | Transfer fee | Contract until |
Goalkeepers
| 1 | Vasilis Barkas | (Greece) (Netherlands) | GK | 30 May 1994 (aged 26) | 2016 | (Greece) Atromitos | €600,000 | 2022 |
| 16 | Panagiotis Tsintotas | (Greece) | GK | 4 July 1993 (aged 26) | 2017 | (Greece) Levadiakos | Free | 2023 |
| 30 | Georgios Athanasiadis | (Greece) | GK | 7 April 1993 (aged 27) | 2019 | (Greece) Asteras Tripolis | Free | 2023 |
Defenders
| 2 | Michalis Bakakis (Vice-captain 2) | (Greece) | RB / LB / CB / RM | 18 March 1991 (aged 29) | 2014 | (Greece) Panetolikos | €250,000 | 2023 |
| 3 | Hélder Lopes | (Portugal) | LB / LM / LW | 4 January 1989 (aged 31) | 2017 | (Spain) Las Palmas | Free | 2022 |
| 4 | Marios Oikonomou | (Greece) | CB / LB | 6 October 1992 (aged 27) | 2019 | (Italy) Bologna | €700,000 | 2022 |
| 15 | Žiga Laci | (Slovenia) (Hungary) | CB | 20 July 2002 (aged 17) | 2020 | (Slovenia) Mura | €400,000 | 2023 |
| 19 | Dmytro Chyhrynskyi | (Ukraine) | CB | 7 November 1986 (aged 33) | 2016 | (Ukraine) Dnipro Dnipropetrovsk | Free | 2021 |
| 21 | Ognjen Vranješ | (Bosnia and Herzegovina) (Serbia) | CB / RB | 24 October 1989 (aged 30) | 2019 | (Belgium) Anderlecht | Free | 2020 |
| 23 | Niklas Hult | (Sweden) | LB / LM | 13 February 1990 (aged 30) | 2018 | (Greece) Panathinaikos | €200,000 | 2020 |
| 24 | Stratos Svarnas | (Greece) | CB / RB | 11 November 1997 (aged 22) | 2018 | (Greece) Xanthi | Free | 2023 |
| 27 | Paulinho | (Portugal) | RB / RM | 13 July 1991 (aged 28) | 2019 | (Portugal) Chaves | Free | 2021 |
| 31 | Konstantinos Stamoulis | (Greece) | CB / RB | 29 October 2000 (aged 19) | 2018 | (Greece) AEK Athens U19 | — | 2021 |
Midfielders
| 5 | Damian Szymański | (Poland) | CM / DM / AM | 16 June 1995 (aged 25) | 2020 | (Russia) Akhmat Grozny | €200,000 | 2020 |
| 6 | Nenad Krstičić | (Serbia) | CM / DM / AM | 3 July 1990 (aged 29) | 2019 | (Serbia) Red Star | €500,000 | 2022 |
| 8 | André Simões (Vice-captain) | (Portugal) | DM / CM | 16 December 1989 (aged 30) | 2015 | (Portugal) Moreirense | Free | 2022 |
| 20 | Petros Mantalos (Captain) | (Greece) | AM / LM / CM / LW / SS / RM / RW | 31 August 1991 (aged 28) | 2014 | (Greece) Xanthi | €500,000 | 2022 |
| 25 | Konstantinos Galanopoulos | (Greece) | CM / DM | 28 December 1997 (aged 22) | 2015 | (Greece) AEK Athens U20 | — | 2021 |
| 44 | Anel Šabanadžović | (Bosnia and Herzegovina) (United States) | CM / DM | 24 May 1999 (aged 21) | 2019 | (Bosnia and Herzegovina) Željezničar | €450,000 | 2023 |
| 51 | Giannis Sardelis | (Greece) | AM / CM / RW / LW | 3 November 2000 (aged 19) | 2018 | (Greece) AEK Athens U19 | — | 2021 |
| 70 | Giannis Fivos Botos | (Greece) | AM / CM / LM / RM | 20 December 2000 (aged 19) | 2018 | (Greece) AEK Athens U19 | — | 2023 |
Forwards
| 7 | Daniele Verde | (Italy) | RW / RM / SS / LW / LM / ST | 20 June 1996 (aged 24) | 2019 | (Italy) Roma | €1,000,000 | 2022 |
| 10 | Marko Livaja | (Croatia) | SS / ST / AM / LW / RW / LM / RM | 26 August 1993 (aged 26) | 2018 | (Spain) Las Palmas | €1,800,000 | 2021 |
| 11 | Sergio Araujo | (Argentina) | ST / SS / LW / RW | 28 January 1992 (aged 28) | 2020 | (Spain) Las Palmas | €500,000 | 2020 |
| 14 | Christos Albanis | (Greece) | LW / RW / LM / RM / SS | 4 November 1994 (aged 25) | 2018 | (Greece) Apollon Smyrnis | €400,000 | 2021 |
| 17 | Victor Klonaridis | (Belgium) (Greece) | SS / LW / RW / LM / RM / ST / AM / CM | 28 July 1992 (aged 27) | 2017 | (France) Lens | €200,000 | 2020 |
| 18 | Nélson Oliveira | (Portugal) | ST / SS | 8 August 1991 (aged 28) | 2019 | (England) Norwich City | €1,000,000 | 2021 |
| 52 | Efthymis Christopoulos | (Greece) | ST / SS / RW / LW | 20 September 2000 (aged 19) | 2020 | (Greece) AEK Athens U19 | — | 2023 |
| 53 | Theodosis Macheras | (Greece) | LW / RW / RM / LM | 9 May 2000 (aged 20) | 2020 | (Greece) AEK Athens U19 | — | 2023 |
Left during Winter Transfer Window
| 28 | Stavros Vasilantonopoulos | (Greece) | RB / RM / LM / DM | 28 January 1992 (aged 28) | 2015 | (Greece) Apollon Smyrnis | Free | 2021 |
| 12 | Francisco Geraldes | (Portugal) | AM / CM / RM / LM | 18 April 1995 (aged 25) | 2019 | (Portugal) Sporting CP | Free | 2020 |
| 22 | David Simão | (Portugal) (France) | CM / AM / DM | 15 May 1990 (aged 30) | 2019 | (Belgium) Antwerp | €400,000 | 2022 |
| 39 | Erik Morán | (Spain) | DM / CM | 25 May 1991 (aged 29) | 2018 | (Spain) Leganés | €130,000 | 2021 |
| 9 | Giorgos Giakoumakis | (Greece) | ST / SS | 9 December 1994 (aged 25) | 2017 | (Greece) Platanias | €300,000 | 2021 |
| 77 | Christos Giousis | (Greece) | RW / LW / RM / LM / SS / AM | 8 October 1999 (aged 20) | 2017 | (Greece) AEK Athens U20 | — | 2022 |
| — | Miloš Deletić | (Serbia) | RW / LW / RM / LM / SS / AM / ST / CM | 14 October 1993 (aged 26) | 2019 | (Greece) AEL | Free | 2022 |

== Transfers ==
=== In ===
==== Summer ====
| No. | Pos. | Player | From | Fee | Date | Contract Until | Source |
|---|---|---|---|---|---|---|---|
| 7 | FW | (Italy) Daniele Verde | (Italy) Roma | €1,000,000^{[a]} | 17 July 2019 | 30 June 2022 | |
| 9 | FW | (Greece) Giorgos Giakoumakis | (Greece) OFI | Loan return | 1 July 2019 | 30 June 2021 | |
| 11 | FW | (Serbia) Miloš Deletić | (Greece) AEL | Free transfer | 1 July 2019 | 30 June 2022 | |
| 18 | FW | (Portugal) Nélson Oliveira | (England) Norwich City | €1,000,000 | 20 July 2019 | 30 June 2021 | |
| 22 | MF | (Portugal) David Simão | (Belgium) Antwerp | €400,000 | 22 June 2019 | 30 June 2022 | |
| 27 | DF | (Portugal) Paulinho | (Portugal) Chaves | Free transfer | 1 July 2019 | 30 June 2021 | |
| 28 | DF | (Greece) Stavros Vasilantonopoulos | (Greece) Lamia | Loan return | 1 July 2019 | 30 June 2020 | |
| 30 | GK | (Greece) Georgios Athanasiadis | (Greece) Asteras Tripolis | Free transfer | 1 July 2019 | 30 June 2023 | |
| 39 | MF | (Spain) Erik Morán | (Spain) Málaga | Loan return | 1 July 2019 | 30 June 2021 | |
| 44 | MF | (Bosnia and Herzegovina) Anel Šabanadžović | (Bosnia and Herzegovina) Željezničar | Loan return | 1 July 2019 | 31 December 2023 | |
| — | GK | (Greece) Athanasios Pantos | (Greece) Sparta | Loan return | 1 July 2019 | 30 June 2020 | |
| — | GK | (Greece) Vasilios Chatziemmanouil | (Greece) Agioi Anargyroi | Loan return | 1 July 2019 | 30 June 2021 | |
| — | DF | (Greece) Georgios Kornezos | (Greece) Ethnikos Piraeus | Free transfer | 1 July 2019 | 30 June 2022 | |
| — | MF | (Greece) Konstantinos Malai | (Greece) Paniliakos | Loan return | 1 July 2019 | 30 June 2021 | |
| — | MF | (Greece) Paris Babis | (Greece) Apollon Pontus | Loan return | 1 July 2019 | 30 June 2022 | |
| — | MF | (Greece) Ilias Tselios | (Greece) Ergotelis | Loan return | 1 July 2019 | 30 June 2020 | |
| — | FW | (Greece) Christos Antoniou | (Greece) Diagoras | Loan return | 1 July 2019 | 30 June 2022 | |
| — | FW | (Greece) Andreas Vlachomitros | (Greece) Sparta | Loan return | 1 July 2019 | 30 June 2019 | |

==== Winter ====
| No. | Pos. | Player | From | Fee | Date | Contract Until | Source |
|---|---|---|---|---|---|---|---|
| 15 | DF | (Slovenia) Žiga Laci | (Slovenia) Mura | €400,000 | 14 February 2020 | 31 December 2023 | |
| 52 | FW | (Greece) Efthymis Christopoulos | (Greece) AEK Athens U19 | Promotion | 11 February 2020 | 30 June 2023 | |
| 53 | FW | (Greece) Theodosis Macheras | (Greece) AEK Athens U19 | Promotion | 17 February 2020 | 30 June 2023 | |
| — | GK | (Greece) Athanasios Pantos | (Greece) Kalamata | Loan termination | 31 January 2020 | 30 June 2021 | |
| — | DF | (Greece) Giannis Tsivelekidis | (Greece) Kalamata | Loan termination | 31 December 2019 | 30 June 2021 | |
| — | DF | (Greece) Georgios Kornezos | (Greece) Volos | Loan termination | 16 January 2020 | 30 June 2023 | |
| — | MF | (Greece) Paris Babis | (Greece) Kalamata | Loan termination | 27 January 2020 | 30 June 2021 | |

=== Out ===
==== Summer ====
| No. | Pos. | Player | To | Fee | Date | Source |
|---|---|---|---|---|---|---|
| 5 | DF | (Greece) Vasilios Lampropoulos | (Spain) Deportivo La Coruña | End of contract | 1 July 2019 | |
| 11 | FW | (Greece) Giannis Gianniotas | (Cyprus) Apollon Limassol | Contract termination | 27 June 2019 | |
| 12 | DF | (Brazil) Rodrigo Galo | (Greece) Atromitos | End of contract | 13 September 2019 | |
| 14 | FW | (Greece) Anastasios Bakasetas | (Turkey) Alanyaspor | €700,000 | 15 June 2019 | |
| 15 | DF | (Serbia) Uroš Ćosić | (Romania) Universitatea Craiova | Free transfer | 2 September 2019 | |
| 22 | FW | (Argentina) Ezequiel Ponce | (Italy) Roma | Loan return | 30 June 2019 | |
| 31 | FW | (Argentina) Lucas Boyé | (Italy) Torino | Loan return | 30 June 2019 | |
| 40 | GK | (Greece) Makis Giannikoglou | (Greece) PAS Giannina | Contract termination | 6 June 2019 | |
| 95 | MF | (Brazil) Alef | (Portugal) Braga | Loan return | 30 June 2019 | |
| — | DF | (Greece) Alkis Markopouliotis | (Greece) Doxa Drama | End of contract | 21 August 2019 | |
| — | MF | (Greece) Konstantinos Malai | (Greece) Thyella Kamari | Free transfer | 19 September 2019 | |
| — | MF | (Greece) Ilias Tselios | (Greece) Ergotelis | Free transfer | 29 August 2019 | |
| — | FW | (Greece) Christos Antoniou | (Greece) Aiolikos | Free transfer | 18 September 2019 | |
| — | FW | (Greece) Andreas Vlachomitros | (Greece) Apollon Pontus | End of contract | 10 September 2019 | |

==== Winter ====
| No. | Pos. | Player | To | Fee | Date | Source |
|---|---|---|---|---|---|---|
| 12 | MF | (Portugal) Francisco Geraldes | (Portugal) Sporting CP | Loan termination | 29 January 2020 | |
| 39 | MF | (Spain) Erik Morán | (Spain) Numancia | Free transfer | 10 January 2020 | |
| — | DF | (Greece) Giannis Tsivelekidis | (Slovenia) Fužinar | Free transfer | 11 February 2020 | |

=== Loan in ===
==== Summer ====
| No. | Pos. | Player | From | Fee | Date | Until | Option to buy | Source |
|---|---|---|---|---|---|---|---|---|
| 12 | MF | (Portugal) Francisco Geraldes | (Portugal) Sporting CP | Free | 1 July 2019 | 30 June 2020 | ✗ | |
| 21 | DF | (Bosnia and Herzegovina) Ognjen Vranješ | (Belgium) Anderlecht | Free | 1 July 2019 | 30 June 2020 | ✗ | |

==== Winter ====
| No. | Pos. | Player | From | Fee | Date | Until | Option to buy | Source |
|---|---|---|---|---|---|---|---|---|
| 5 | MF | (Poland) Damian Szymański | (Russia) Akhmat Grozny | €200,000 | 14 January 2020 | 30 June 2020 | ✓ | |
| 11 | FW | (Argentina) Sergio Araujo | (Spain) Las Palmas | €500,000 | 31 January 2020 | 31 July 2020 | ✓ | |

=== Loan out ===
==== Summer ====
| No. | Pos. | Player | To | Fee | Date | Until | Option to buy | Source |
|---|---|---|---|---|---|---|---|---|
| 33 | DF | (Greece) Giorgos Giannoutsos | (Cyprus) Alki Oroklini | Free | 21 July 2019 | 30 June 2020 | ✗ | |
| 99 | GK | (Greece) Panagiotis Ginis | (Greece) Aspropyrgos | Free | 31 August 2019 | 30 June 2020 | ✗ | |
| — | GK | (Greece) Athanasios Pantos | (Greece) Kalamata | Free | 26 July 2019 | 30 June 2020 | ✗ | |
| — | GK | (Greece) Vasilios Chatziemmanouil | (Greece) Fostiras | Free | 19 July 2019 | 30 June 2020 | ✗ | |
| — | DF | (Greece) Georgios Kornezos | (Greece) Volos | Free | 24 June 2019 | 30 June 2020 | ✗ | |
| — | DF | (Greece) Michalis Bousis | (Greece) Ergotelis | Free | 25 August 2019 | 30 June 2020 | ✗ | |
| — | DF | (Greece) Giannis Tsivelekidis | (Greece) Kalamata | Free | 26 July 2019 | 30 June 2020 | ✗ | |
| — | MF | (Greece) Paris Babis | (Greece) Kalamata | Free | 6 September 2019 | 30 June 2020 | ✗ | |

==== Winter ====
| No. | Pos. | Player | To | Fee | Date | Until | Option to buy | Source |
|---|---|---|---|---|---|---|---|---|
| 9 | FW | (Greece) Giorgos Giakoumakis | (Poland) Górnik Zabrze | Free | 3 March 2020 | 30 June 2020 | ✓ | |
| 11 | FW | (Serbia) Miloš Deletić | (Greece) Asteras Tripolis | Undisclosed | 31 January 2020 | 30 June 2020 | ✗ | |
| 22 | MF | (Portugal) David Simão | (Israel) Hapoel Be'er Sheva | Free | 5 February 2020 | 30 June 2020 | ✓ | |
| 28 | DF | (Greece) Stavros Vasilantonopoulos | (Poland) Górnik Zabrze | Free | 3 March 2020 | 30 June 2020 | ✓ | |
| — | GK | (Greece) Athanasios Pantos | (Greece) Ethnikos Piraeus | Free | 4 February 2020 | 30 June 2020 | ✗ | |
| — | DF | (Greece) Georgios Kornezos | (Greece) Ionikos | Free | 17 January 2020 | 30 June 2021 | ✗ | |
| — | MF | (Greece) Paris Babis | (Greece) Platanias | Free | 31 January 2020 | 30 June 2020 | ✗ | |
| — | FW | (Greece) Christos Giousis | (Greece) Platanias | Free | 31 January 2020 | 30 June 2020 | ✗ | |

Notes

a. Plus 30% resale fee.

=== Contract renewals ===
| No. | Pos. | Player | Date | Former Exp. Date | New Exp. Date | Source |
|---|---|---|---|---|---|---|
| 19 | DF | (Ukraine) Dmytro Chyhrynskyi | 27 July 2020 | 30 July 2020 | 30 June 2021 | |
| 28 | DF | (Greece) Stavros Vasilantonopoulos | 3 March 2020 | 30 June 2020 | 30 June 2021 | |
| 70 | MF | (Greece) Giannis Fivos Botos | 11 February 2020 | 30 June 2021 | 30 June 2023 | |

=== Overall transfer activity ===
==== Expenditure ====
Summer: ▼€2,400,000

Winter: ▼€1,100,000

Total: ▼€3,500,000

==== Income ====
Summer: ▲€700,000

Winter: ▲€0

Total: ▲€700,000

==== Net Totals ====
Summer: ▼€1,700,000

Winter: ▼€1,100,000

Total: ▼€2,800,000

== Pre-season and friendlies ==
| 7 July 2019 Friendly | AEK Athens | 1–0 | Górnik Zabrze | Częstochowa |
| 18:00 EEST (UTC+3) | Livaja 53' | Report | Wiśniewski (yellow card) 27' | Stadium: Stadion Piłkarski |

| 12 July 2019 Friendly | AEK Athens | 1–2 | Trenčín | Częstochowa |
| 19:00 EEST (UTC+3) | Mantalos (penalty missed) 44'; Vranješ (yellow card) 53'; Botos 90+3' | Report | Skovajsa (yellow card) 81'; Bukari 87'; Depetris 79' | Stadium: Stadion Piłkarski |

| 15 July 2019 Friendly | AEK Athens | 1–1 | Maccabi Netanya | Częstochowa |
| 19:00 EEST (UTC+3) | Mantalos 23'; Simão (yellow card) 24'; Vranješ (yellow card) 62' | Report | Cohen (yellow card) 16'; Kahlon (yellow card) 25'; Golobart 54'; Kahat (yellow card) 62'; Pirkl (yellow card) 77' | Stadium: Stadion Piłkarski |

| 16 July 2019 Friendly | AEK Athens | 1–1 | Stal Stalowa Wola | Nowiny |
| 10:30 EEST (UTC+3) | Šabanadžović (yellow card) 49'; Mantalos 70' | Report | Fidziukiewicz 43' | Stadium: GOK Perła Nowiny |

| 20 July 2019 Friendly | AEK Athens | 2–0 | Volos | Marousi |
| 20:00 EEST (UTC+3) | Geraldes 14'; Klonaridis 57'; Svarnas (yellow card) 70' | Report | | Stadium: Olympic Stadium; Attendance: Behind closed doors |

| 24 July 2019 Friendly | Lamia | 0–1 | AEK Athens | Lamia |
| 20:00 EEST (UTC+3) | Saliakas (yellow card) 76' | Report | Albanis 33'; Deletić (yellow card) 87'; Šabanadžović (yellow card) 90+1' | Stadium: Lamia Municipal Stadium |

| 31 July 2019 Friendly | AEK Athens | 0–0 | Başakşehir | Marousi |
| 20:30 EEST (UTC+3) | Vranješ (yellow card) 56' | Report | Chedjou (yellow card) 61' | Stadium: Olympic Stadium; Referee: Giorgos Tzovaras (Phthiotis) |

== Competitions ==
=== Overall record ===
| Competition | First match | Last match | Starting round | Final position | Record | | | | | | | |
| Competition | First match | Last match | Starting round | Final position | Pld | W | D | L | GF | GA | GD | Win % |
|---|---|---|---|---|---|---|---|---|---|---|---|---|
| Super League | 25 August 2019 | 1 March 2020 | Matchday 1 | 3rd | 26 | 15 | 6 | 5 | 42 | 22 | +20 | 57.69 |
| Super League Play-offs | 7 June 2020 | 19 July 2020 | Matchday 1 | 3rd | 10 | 5 | 3 | 2 | 17 | 10 | +7 | 50.00 |
| Greek Cup | 16 January 2020 | 12 September 2020 | Round of 16 | Runners-up | 7 | 3 | 3 | 1 | 12 | 6 | +6 | 42.86 |
| UEFA Europa League | 8 August 2019 | 29 August 2019 | Third qualifying round | Play-off round | 4 | 2 | 1 | 1 | 6 | 4 | +2 | 50.00 |
| Total | | | | | 47 | 25 | 13 | 9 | 77 | 42 | +35 | 53.19 |

Last updated: 12 September 2020
Source: Competitions

=== Super League Greece ===
==== Regular season ====
===== League table =====
| Pos | Team | Pld | W | D | L | GF | GA | GD | Pts | Qualification |
|---|---|---|---|---|---|---|---|---|---|---|
| 1 | Olympiacos | 26 | 20 | 6 | 0 | 53 | 9 | +44 | 66 | Qualification for the Play-off round |
| 2 | PAOK | 26 | 18 | 5 | 3 | 50 | 23 | +27 | 59 | Qualification for the Play-off round |
| 3 | AEK Athens | 26 | 15 | 6 | 5 | 42 | 22 | +20 | 51 | Qualification for the Play-off round |
| 4 | Panathinaikos | 26 | 12 | 8 | 6 | 35 | 23 | +12 | 44 | Qualification for the Play-off round |
| 5 | OFI | 26 | 10 | 4 | 12 | 35 | 35 | 0 | 34 (Note: Head-to-head points: OFI 4, Aris 1.) | Qualification for the Play-off round |

Source: Super League Greece
Rules for classification: 1) Points; 2) Head-to-head points; 3) Head-to-head goal difference; 4) Goal difference; 5) Goals scored; 6) Play-offs (neutral ground).
(Note: Criteria 6 is only used if needed to decide champion, teams for relegation or teams for UEFA competitions).

===== Results summary =====
| Overall | | | | | | | | Home | | | | | | Away | | | | | |
| Pld | W | D | L | GF | GA | GD | Pts | W | D | L | GF | GA | GD | W | D | L | GF | GA | GD |
|---|---|---|---|---|---|---|---|---|---|---|---|---|---|---|---|---|---|---|---|
| 26 | 15 | 6 | 5 | 42 | 22 | +20 | 51 | 9 | 3 | 1 | 29 | 11 | +18 | 6 | 3 | 4 | 13 | 11 | +2 |

Last updated: 2020-03-01.
Source: Super League Greece

===== Results by Matchday =====
| Round | 1 | 2 | 3 | 4 | 5 | 6 | 7 | 8 | 9 | 10 | 11 | 12 | 13 | 14 | 15 | 16 | 17 | 18 | 19 | 20 | 21 | 22 | 23 | 24 | 25 | 26 |
|---|---|---|---|---|---|---|---|---|---|---|---|---|---|---|---|---|---|---|---|---|---|---|---|---|---|---|
| Ground | H | A | H | A | H | A | H | A | H | A | H | A | H | A | H | A | H | A | H | A | H | A | H | A | H | A |
| Result | L | W | W | W | D | D | W | L | W | L | D | L | W | W | W | D | W | L | W | W | D | W | W | W | W | D |
| Position | 11 | 6 | 5 | 4 | 5 | 5 | 4 | 5 | 3 | 3 | 3 | 5 | 3 | 3 | 3 | 3 | 3 | 3 | 3 | 3 | 3 | 3 | 3 | 3 | 3 | 3 |

Updated to match(es) played on 1 March 2020. Source: slgr.gr
A = Away; H = Home; W = Win; D = Draw; L = Loss; P = Postponed

===== Matches =====
| 25 August 2019 1 | AEK Athens | 1–2 | Xanthi | Marousi |
| 21:00 EEST (UTC+3) | Geraldes (yellow card) 12' (yellow-red card) 34'; Svarnas (yellow card) 75'; Oliveira 90'; Mantalos (yellow card) 90+3' | Report | Đuričković (yellow card) 7'; Baxevanidis (yellow card) 31'; Kovačević (yellow card) 37'; De Amorim 67'; Terki (yellow card) 69'; Barrientos 78' | Stadium: Olympic Stadium; Attendance: 10,238; Referee: Giannis Papadopoulos (Macedonia); Man of the Match: William De Amorim |

| 1 September 2019 2 | Asteras Tripolis | 2–3 | AEK Athens | Tripoli |
| 20:30 EEST (UTC+3) | L. Fernández 3'; Iglesias (yellow card) 27'; Suárez (yellow card) 53'; B. Fernández (yellow card) 56'; Baralles 73' (pen.), (yellow card) 81' | Report | Oliveira 15'; Vranješ (yellow card) 27'; Simões (yellow card) 36', (goal) 90+2'; Livaja 68', (yellow card) 69'; Bakakis (yellow card) 72' | Stadium: Theodoros Kolokotronis Stadium; Attendance: 3,825; Referee: Anastasios Sidiropoulos (Dodecanese); Man of the Match: Marko Livaja |

| 15 September 2019 3 | AEK Athens | 2–0 | Lamia | Marousi |
| 20:30 EEST (UTC+3) | Vranješ (yellow card) 16', (goal) 45+2'; Pliatsikas 37' (o.g.); Livaja (yellow card) 68' | Report | Vanderson (yellow card) 68' | Stadium: Olympic Stadium; Attendance: 17,093; Referee: Evangelos Manouchos (Argolida); Man of the Match: Marko Livaja |

| 21 September 2019 4 | Panetolikos | 0–1 | AEK Athens | Agrinio |
| 19:00 EEST (UTC+3) | | Report | Krstičić (yellow card) 33'; Simões (yellow card) 55'; Livaja 69' | Stadium: Panetolikos Stadium; Attendance: 3,537; Referee: Anastasios Papapetrou (Athens); Man of the Match: Marko Livaja |

| 29 September 2019 5 | AEK Athens | 2–2 | PAOK | Marousi |
| 18:30 EEST (UTC+3) | Chyhrynskyi 54'; Vranješ (yellow card) 55'; Deletić 79'; Galanopoulos (yellow card) 83' | Report | Świderski 16', 58'; Biseswar (penalty missed) 25'; Giannoulis (yellow card) 51'; Jabá (yellow card) 82' | Stadium: Olympic Stadium; Attendance: 32,576; Referee: Stephan Klossner (Switzerland); Man of the Match: Dimitrios Limnios |

| 5 October 2019 6 | AEL | 0–0 | AEK Athens | Larissa |
| 19:30 EEST (UTC+3) | Šećerović (yellow card) 2'; Kaçe (yellow card) 14'; Bertos (yellow card) 90+3' | Report | Livaja (yellow card) 6'; Vranješ (yellow card) 7'; Paulinho (yellow card) 50'; Geraldes (yellow card) 77' | Stadium: AEL FC Arena; Attendance: 4,404; Referee: Stefanos Koubarakis (Thrace); Man of the Match: Marko Livaja |

| 20 October 2019 7 | AEK Athens | 3–2 | Volos | Rizoupoli |
| 19:30 EEST (UTC+3) | Livaja 31', (yellow card) 81'; Simões (yellow card) 49'; Mantalos 75' (pen.), 78' | Report | Torres (yellow card) 20', (goal) 24'; Diamantis (yellow card) 23'; Muñiz (red card) 45+2'; Max (yellow card) 71'; Fernando (yellow card) 79'; Dimopoulos 83'; Tsokanis (yellow card) 89' | Stadium: Georgios Kamaras Stadium; Attendance: 13,579; Referee: Praxitelis Zachariadis (Macedonia); Man of the Match: Petros Mantalos |
Note: Change of venue due to unavailability of the Olympic Stadium.

| 26 October 2019 8 | Olympiacos | 2–0 | AEK Athens | Piraeus |
| 19:30 EEST (UTC+3) | Semedo (yellow card) 2', (goal) 9'; Camara 77'; Masouras (yellow card) 87' | Report | Galanopoulos (yellow card) 48'; Lopes (yellow card) 79'; Oliveira (yellow card) 86' | Stadium: Karaiskakis Stadium; Attendance: 31,157; Referee: Jorge Sousa (Portugal); Man of the Match: Mady Camara |

| 2 November 2019 9 | AEK Athens | 3–2 | Atromitos | Marousi |
| 19:30 EET (UTC+2) | Mandas 62' (o.g.); Oliveira 71', 90+3'; Mantalos (yellow card) 86' | Report | Manousos (penalty missed) 20', 20'; Talocha (yellow card) 31'; Charisis (yellow card) 36'; Baena (yellow card) 47'; Androutsos (yellow card) 87', (goal) 89'; Goutas (yellow card) 90+1' | Stadium: Olympic Stadium; Attendance: 15,129; Referee: Vasilis Fotias (Pella); Man of the Match: Nélson Oliveira |

| 9 November 2019 10 | Panathinaikos | 3–2 | AEK Athens | Marousi |
| 19:30 EET (UTC+2) | Poungouras (yellow card) 12'; Insúa (yellow card) 23'; Schenkeveld (yellow card) 60'; Macheda 67'; Perea 70'; Kolovetsios 88'; Chatzitheodoridis (yellow card) 90' | Report | Bakakis 18'; Oliveira 36'; Simões (yellow card) 62' | Stadium: Olympic Stadium; Attendance: 11,056; Referee: Mattias Gestranius (Finland); Man of the Match: Dimitrios Kolovetsios |

| 24 November 2019 11 | AEK Athens | 1–1 | Aris | Marousi |
| 19:30 EET (UTC+2) | Lopes (yellow card) 30'; Mantalos (yellow card) 47', (goal) 81' (pen.); Giakoumakis (yellow card) 47'; Vranješ (yellow card) 81' | Report | Ideye (red card) 53'; Larsson 64'; Rose (yellow card) 78'; Korhut (yellow card) 80'; Vélez (yellow card) 80'; Tsilingiris (yellow card) 90+7' | Stadium: Olympic Stadium; Attendance: 13,087; Referee: Angelos Evangelou (Athens); Man of the Match: Apostolos Tsilingiris |

| 30 November 2019 12 | OFI | 1–0 | AEK Athens | Heraklion |
| 19:30 EET (UTC+2) | Semedo 52'; Tsilianidis (yellow card) 63'; Marinakis (yellow card) 78' | Report | Paulinho (yellow card) 24'; Krstičić (yellow card) 60'; Livaja (yellow card) 69'; Vranješ (red card) 88' | Stadium: Theodoros Vardinogiannis Stadium; Attendance: 5,311; Referee: Anastasios Papapetrou (Athens); Man of the Match: Lisandro Semedo |

| 7 December 2019 13 | AEK Athens | 5–0 | Panionios | Marousi |
| 19:30 EET (UTC+2) | Oliveira 17', 27', 64' (pen.); Livaja (yellow card) 62'; Verde 77'; Mantalos 89' | Report | Papanikolaou (yellow card) 76'; Evangelou (yellow card) 84' | Stadium: Olympic Stadium; Attendance: 9,302; Referee: Aristomenis Koutsiaftis (Arta); Man of the Match: Nélson Oliveira |

| 14 December 2019 14 | Xanthi | 0–1 | AEK Athens | Xanthi |
| 20:00 EET (UTC+2) | Đuričković (yellow card) 42'; Barrientos (yellow card) 51'; Camara (yellow card) 58'; Fasidis (yellow card) 72'; Sturgeon (yellow card) 89' | Report | Svarnas (yellow card) 63'; Galanopoulos 84' | Stadium: Xanthi FC Arena; Attendance: 2,821; Referee: Praxitelis Zachariadis (Macedonia); Man of the Match: Konstantinos Galanopoulos |

| 18 December 2019 15 | AEK Athens | 2–1 | Asteras Tripolis | Marousi |
| 19:30 EET (UTC+2) | Mantalos 6' (pen.); Livaja 46'; Krstičić (yellow card) 55'; Simões (yellow card) 90+3' | Report | L. Fernández (yellow card) 14', (goal) 78'; Vlachos (yellow card) 90+1' | Stadium: Olympic Stadium; Attendance: 12,126; Referee: Fotis Fotiadis (Kastoria); Man of the Match: Paulinho |

| 21 December 2019 16 | Lamia | 0–0 | AEK Athens | Lamia |
| 20:00 EET (UTC+2) | Vasilogiannis (yellow card) 55' | Report | Krstičić (yellow card) 47'; Lopes (yellow card) 56'; Livaja (yellow card) 84'; Paulinho (yellow card) 87'; Simões (yellow card) 89' | Stadium: Lamia Municipal Stadium; Attendance: 3,061; Referee: Manolis Skoulas (Thessaly); Man of the Match: Daniel Adejo |

| 5 January 2020 17 | AEK Athens | 3–1 | Panetolikos | Marousi |
| 15:00 EET (UTC+2) | Livaja 29' (pen.), 56'; Šabanadžović (yellow card) 40'; Deletić (yellow card) 41'; Krstičić (yellow card) 68'; Oikonomou (yellow card) 71'; Verde 83' (pen.) | Report | Tahar (yellow card) 29'; Díaz 42'; Knett (yellow card) 57'; García (yellow card) 66'; Duarte (yellow card) 69' | Stadium: Olympic Stadium; Attendance: 12,124; Referee: Giorgos Tassis (Epirus); Man of the Match: Marko Livaja |

| 12 January 2020 18 | PAOK | 1–0 | AEK Athens | Thessaloniki |
| 19:30 EET (UTC+2) | Vieirinha 57' (pen.); Matos (yellow card) 82'; Mišić (yellow card) 90+4' | Report | Livaja (yellow card) 42' (yellow-red card) 90+5'; Krstičić (yellow card) 65'; Hult (red card) 90+1' | Stadium: Toumba Stadium; Attendance: 21,332; Referee: Orel Grinfeld (Israel); Man of the Match: Vieirinha |

| 19 January 2020 19 | AEK Athens | 3–0 | AEL | Marousi |
| 17:15 EET (UTC+2) | Simões 45+2'; Oliveira 50', (yellow card) 51'; Lopes 62' | Report | Bertos (yellow card) 45+1'; Milosavljević (yellow card) 57' | Stadium: Olympic Stadium; Attendance: 10,325; Referee: Aristotelis Diamantopoulos (Arcadia); Man of the Match: Nélson Oliveira |

| 22 January 2020 20 | Volos | 1–3 | AEK Athens | Volos |
| 17:15 EET (UTC+2) | Fernando (yellow card) 44'; V. Ikonomou (yellow card) 63'; Diamantis (yellow card) 85'; Guarrotxena 89'; Melissas (yellow card) 90+7' | Report | M. Oikonomou 9'; Vranješ (yellow card) 21'; Albanis 25'; Klonaridis 52'; Svarnas (yellow card) 84' | Stadium: Panthessaliko Stadium; Attendance: 2,773; Referee: Petros Tsagarakis (Chania); Man of the Match: Hélder Lopes |

| 26 January 2020 21 | AEK Athens | 0–0 | Olympiacos | Marousi |
| 19:30 EET (UTC+2) | Simões (yellow card) 70' (yellow-red card) 87'; Mantalos (yellow card) 87' | Report | Masouras (yellow card) 47'; Valbuena (yellow card) 87' | Stadium: Olympic Stadium; Attendance: 23,741; Referee: Matej Jug (Slovenia; Man of the Match: Ognjen Vranješ |

| 2 February 2020 22 | Atromitos | 0–1 | AEK Athens | Peristeri |
| 17:15 EET (UTC+2) | Kivrakidis (yellow card) 27'; Goutas (yellow card) 44'; Katranis (yellow card) 45' | Report | Chyhrynskyi (yellow card) 7'; Araujo (yellow card) 26'; Krstičić (yellow card) 31' (yellow-red card) 90+6', (goal) 65'; Livaja (yellow card) 43'; Simões (yellow card) 45+2'; Lopes (yellow card) 59'; Szymański (yellow card) 70'; Oikonomou (yellow card) 79' | Stadium: Peristeri Stadium; Attendance: 1,369; Referee: Anastasios Sidiropoulos (Dodecanese); Man of the Match: Damian Szymański |

| 9 February 2020 23 | AEK Athens | 1–0 | Panathinaikos | Marousi |
| 19:30 EET (UTC+2) | Araujo 8'; Livaja (yellow card) 45'; Szymański (yellow card) 61'; Lopes (yellow card) 78'; Barkas (yellow card) 90+4' | Report | Schenkeveld (yellow card) 72'; Johansson (yellow card) 87' | Stadium: Olympic Stadium; Attendance: 20,374; Referee: Fran Jović (Croatia); Man of the Match: Sergio Araujo |

| 16 February 2020 24 | Aris | 0–1 | AEK Athens | Thessaloniki |
| 19:30 EET (UTC+2) | Fetfatzidis (yellow card) 40' | Report | Albanis 5'; Svarnas (yellow card) 30'; Vranješ (yellow card) 31'; Szymański (yellow card) 39'; Oikonomou (yellow card) 82' | Stadium: Kleanthis Vikelidis Stadium; Attendance: 11,324; Referee: Dimitris Karantonis (Imathia); Man of the Match: Nenad Krstičić |

| 23 February 2020 25 | AEK Athens | 3–0 | OFI | Marousi |
| 19:30 EET (UTC+2) | Mantalos 5'; Daniele Verde 8', 31'; Livaja (yellow card) 26' (yellow-red card) 90+1' | Report | Vaz (yellow card) 27' | Stadium: Olympic Stadium; Attendance: Behind closed doors Referee: Giorgos Tassis (Epirus); Man of the Match: Daniele Verde |

| 1 March 2020 26 | Panionios | 1–1 | AEK Athens | Nea Smyrni |
| 19:00 EET (UTC+2) | Rentzas (yellow card) 35'; Emmanouilidis 45+1'; Papanikolaou (yellow card) 66' | Report | Paulinho (yellow card) 11'; Araujo (yellow card) 62'; Klonaridis 90+2' | Stadium: Nea Smyrni Stadium; Attendance: Behind closed doors Referee: Angelos Evangelou (Athens); Man of the Match: Matic Kotnik |

==== Play-off round ====
===== Table =====
| Pos | Team | Pld | W | D | L | GF | GA | GD | Pts | Qualification |
|---|---|---|---|---|---|---|---|---|---|---|
| 1 | Olympiacos (C) | 36 | 28 | 7 | 1 | 74 | 16 | +58 | 91 | Qualification for the Champions League play-off round |
| 2 | PAOK | 36 | 21 | 10 | 5 | 58 | 29 | +29 | 73 | Qualification for the Champions League second qualifying round |
| 3 | AEK Athens | 36 | 20 | 9 | 7 | 59 | 32 | +27 | 69 | Qualification for the Europa League third qualifying round |
| 4 | Panathinaikos (Note: Panathinaikos were banned from UEFA club competitions for the first season they would qualify between the 2018–19 and 2020–21 seasons by the UEFA Club Financial Control Body on 24 April 2018 due to overdue payables, and since they did not qualify for either the 2018–19 or 2019–20 season, they were banned from the 2020–21 season.) | 36 | 15 | 13 | 8 | 43 | 32 | +11 | 58 | |
| 5 | Aris | 36 | 10 | 12 | 14 | 48 | 51 | −3 | 42 | Qualification for the Europa League second qualifying round |
| 6 | OFI | 36 | 10 | 6 | 20 | 43 | 56 | −13 | 36 | Qualification for the Europa League second qualifying round |

Source: Super League Greece
Rules for classification: 1) Points; 2) Head-to-head points; 3) Head-to-head goal difference; 4) Goals scored; 5) Goals against; 6) Play-offs (neutral ground); 7) Draw.
(Note: Criteria 6 is only used if needed to decide champion, teams for relegation or teams for UEFA competitions).
(C) Champions

===== Results summary =====
| Overall | | | | | | | | Home | | | | | | Away | | | | | |
| Pld | W | D | L | GF | GA | GD | Pts | W | D | L | GF | GA | GD | W | D | L | GF | GA | GD |
|---|---|---|---|---|---|---|---|---|---|---|---|---|---|---|---|---|---|---|---|
| 10 | 5 | 3 | 2 | 17 | 10 | +7 | 18 | 1 | 3 | 1 | 6 | 5 | +1 | 4 | 0 | 1 | 11 | 5 | +6 |

Last updated: 2020-07-19.
Source: Super League Greece

===== Results by Matchday =====
| Round | 1 | 2 | 3 | 4 | 5 | 6 | 7 | 8 | 9 | 10 |
|---|---|---|---|---|---|---|---|---|---|---|
| Ground | H | A | H | H | A | A | H | A | H | A |
| Result | D | W | D | L | W | W | W | W | D | L |
| Position | 3 | 2 | 3 | 3 | 2 | 2 | 3 | 3 | 3 | 3 |

Updated to match(es) played on 19 July 2020. Source: slgr.gr
A = Away; H = Home; W = Win; D = Draw; L = Loss; P = Postponed

===== Matches =====
| 7 June 2020 1 | AEK Athens | 1–1 | Panathinaikos | Marousi |
| 21:30 EEST (UTC+3) | Lopes (yellow card) 42'; Simões (yellow card) 51'; Livaja 76' | Report | Kourbelis (yellow card) 32'; Macheda 65'; Insúa (yellow card) 75' | Stadium: Olympic Stadium; Attendance: Behind closed doors Referee: Athanasios Tzilos (Larissa); Man of the Match: Marko Livaja |

| 14 June 2020 2 | OFI | 0–2 | AEK Athens | Heraklion |
| 19:15 EEST (UTC+3) | Marinakis (yellow card) 44'; Mellado (yellow card) 66'; Sakor (yellow card) 73' | Report | Livaja 42', (yellow card) 44'; Oliveira (yellow card) 45+2'; Krstičić (yellow card) 52'; Szymański (yellow card) 60'; Mantalos (yellow card) 63'; Verde 65'; Svarnas 79'; Araujo (yellow card) 90+5' | Stadium: Theodoros Vardinogiannis Stadium; Attendance: Behind closed doors Referee: Giorgos Tzovaras (Phthiotis); Man of the Match: Marko Livaja |

| 20 June 2020 3 | AEK Athens | 2–2 | Aris | Marousi |
| 21:30 EEST (UTC+3) | Mantalos (yellow card) 54'; Araujo 62'; Oikonomou (yellow card) 75'; Oliveira 86' (pen.); Szymański (yellow card) 88' | Report | Gama 55' (pen.); Ba (yellow card) 73'; Martínez 75'; Mancini (yellow card) 79' | Stadium: Olympic Stadium; Attendance: Behind closed doors Referee: Anastasios Papapetrou (Athens); Man of the Match: Nélson Oliveira |

| 28 June 2020 4 | AEK Athens | 1–2 | Olympiacos | Marousi |
| 21:30 EEST (UTC+3) | Livaja (yellow card) 7'; Araujo 66' | Report | El-Arabi 38'; Camara 45'; Semedo (yellow card) 55'; Bouchalakis (yellow card) 83' | Stadium: Olympic Stadium; Attendance: Behind closed doors Referee: Clément Turpin (France); Man of the Match: Kostas Fortounis |

| 1 July 2020 5 | PAOK | 0–2 | AEK Athens | Thessaloniki |
| 21:00 EEST (UTC+3) | Matos (yellow card) 31'; Ingason (yellow card) 79'; Varela (yellow card) 86' | Report | Paulinho (yellow card) 11'; Chyhrynskyi 42', (yellow card) 67'; Livaja 81' (pen.) | Stadium: Toumba Stadium; Attendance: Behind closed doors Referee: Marco Di Bello (Italy); Man of the Match: Marko Livaja |

| 5 July 2020 6 | Aris | 1–4 | AEK Athens | Thessaloniki |
| 19:15 EEST (UTC+3) | Paulinho (yellow card) 7'; Oliveira 24', 52'; Lopes (yellow card) 55'; Simões 62'; Szymański 84' | Report | Gama 29'; Matilla (yellow card) 55' | Stadium: Kleanthis Vikelidis Stadium; Attendance: Behind closed doors Referee: Alexei Kulbakov (Belarus); Man of the Match: Nélson Oliveira |

| 8 July 2020 7 | AEK Athens | 2–0 | OFI | Marousi |
| 21:30 EEST (UTC+3) | Oliveira 19'; Svarnas 45'; Oikonomou (yellow card) 49'; Mantalos (yellow card) 57'; Šabanadžović (yellow card) 86' | Report | Perdikis (yellow card) 24'; Staikos (yellow card) 43' | Stadium: Olympic Stadium; Attendance: Behind closed doors Referee: Anastasios Sidiropoulos (Dodecanese); Man of the Match: Nélson Oliveira |

| 12 July 2020 8 | Panathinaikos | 1–3 | AEK Athens | Marousi |
| 20:00 EEST (UTC+3) | Kourbelis 15', (yellow card) 67'; Macheda (yellow card) 68' | Report | Chyhrynskyi 8'; Oliveira 43'; Paulinho (yellow card) 59'; Verde 90+4'; Šabanadžović (yellow card) 90+6' | Stadium: Olympic Stadium; Attendance: Behind closed doors Referee: Aristotelis Diamantopoulos (Arcadia); Man of the Match: Nélson Oliveira |

| 15 July 2020 9 | AEK Athens | 0–0 | PAOK | Marousi |
| 21:30 EEST (UTC+3) | | Report | Michailidis (yellow card) 90' | Stadium: Olympic Stadium; Attendance: Behind closed doors Referee: Danny Makkelie (Nederlands); Man of the Match: Petros Mantalos |

| 19 July 2020 10 | Olympiacos | 3–0 | AEK Athens | Piraeus |
| 20:00 EEST (UTC+3) | Valbuena 10'; Ranđelović 21'; Camara 73' | Report | | Stadium: Karaiskakis Stadium; Attendance: Behind closed doors Referee: Anastasios Papapetrou (Athens); Man of the Match: Kostas Fortounis |

=== Greek Cup ===
AEK Athens entered the Greek Cup at the round of 16.

==== Round of 16 ====
| 16 January 2020 First leg | Asteras Tripolis | 1–1 | AEK Athens | Tripoli |
| 17:30 EET (UTC+2) | Crespi 20'; Sito (yellow card) 23'; Munafo (yellow card) 31'; Riera (yellow card) 41'; Iglesias (yellow card) 64'; Suárez (yellow card) 66'; Barrales (penalty missed) 70' | Report | Albanis (yellow card) 12'; Oliveira 33' (pen.); Mantalos (yellow card) 49'; Chyhrynskyi (yellow card) 69' | Stadium: Theodoros Kolokotronis Stadium; Referee: Stathis Gortsilas (Macedonia); Man of the Match: Matías Iglesias |

| 30 January 2020 Second leg | AEK Athens | 2–0 (3–1 agg.) | Asteras Tripolis | Marousi |
| 19:00 EET (UTC+2) | Mantalos 14', (yellow card) 84'; Albanis 17'; Livaja (yellow card) 80' | Report | Barrales (yellow card) 25'; Bellocq (yellow card) 45'; Iglesias (yellow card) 78'; Crespi (yellow card) 79' | Stadium: Olympic Stadium; Attendance: 4,508; Referee: Dimitris Maloutas (Imathia); Man of the Match: Petros Mantalos |

==== Quarter-finals ====
| 5 February 2020 First leg | Panetolikos | 1–1 | AEK Athens | Agrinio |
| 17:00 EET (UTC+2) | Malis (yellow card) 55'; Dauda 60', (yellow card) 75'; Martial (yellow card) 64' | Report | Svarnas 32', (yellow card) 53'; Šabanadžović (yellow card) 51'; Simões (yellow card) 57'; Chyhrynskyi (yellow card) 78'; Araujo (yellow card) 88' | Stadium: Panetolikos Stadium; Referee: Evangelos Manouchos (Argolida); Man of the Match: Stratos Svarnas |

| 19 February 2020 Second leg | AEK Athens | 4–0 (5–1 agg.) | Panetolikos | Marousi |
| 18:15 EET (UTC+2) | Oliveira 7'; Mantalos (yellow card) 32'; Krstičić 36'; Araujo (yellow card) 38'; Livaja (yellow card) 71', (goal) 88'; Albanis 80' | Report | García (yellow card) 56'; Malis (yellow card) 76' | Stadium: Olympic Stadium; Attendance: Behind closed doors Referee: Petros Tsagarakis (Chania); Man of the Match: Nélson Oliveira |

==== Semi-finals ====
| 4 March 2020 First leg | AEK Athens | 2–1 | Aris | Marousi |
| 18:30 EET (UTC+2) | Mantalos 8'; Vranješ (yellow card) 17', (goal) 57'; Krstičić (yellow card) 76' | Report | Gama 11' (pen.); Ideye (yellow card) 17'; Sasha (yellow card) 32'; Matilla (red card) 50'; Ba (yellow card) 76'; Cuesta (yellow card) 88' | Stadium: Olympic Stadium; Attendance: 9,142; Referee: Artur Soares Dias (Portugal); Man of the Match: Ognjen Vranješ |

| 24 June 2020 Second leg | Aris | 2–2 (a.e.t.) (3–4 agg.) | AEK Athens | Thessaloniki |
| 19:00 EEST (UTC+3) | Mancini 57', (yellow card) 84'; Matilla (yellow card) 81'; Diguiny 90+3'; Ba (yellow card) 120+2'; Sasha (yellow card) 120+2' | Report | Simões (yellow card) 54' (yellow-red card) 120+2'; Livaja 90+6', 102'; Mantalos (yellow card) 94' (yellow-red card) 120'; Oliveira (yellow card) 103' (yellow-red card) 120+4'; Svarnas 111' | Stadium: Kleanthis Vikelidis Stadium; Attendance: Behind closed doors Referee: Danny Makkelie (Netherlands); Man of the Match: Marko Livaja |

==== Final ====
| 12 September 2020 Final | AEK Athens | 0–1 | Olympiacos | Volos |
| 21:00 EEST (UTC+3) | Simões (yellow card) 29'; Mantalos (yellow card) 56'; Livaja (yellow card) 83'; Krstičić (yellow card) 90+1'; Lopes (yellow card) 90+5' | Report | Ranđelović 10'; Torosidis (yellow card) 55'; El-Arabi (penalty missed) 55'; Masouras (yellow card) 84'; Cafú (yellow card) 89'; Fortounis (yellow card) 90+1' | Stadium: Panthessaliko Stadium; Attendance: Behind closed doors Referee: Björn Kuipers (Netherlands); Man of the Match: Lazar Ranđelović |

=== UEFA Europa League ===
==== Third qualifying round ====
The draw for the third qualifying round was held on 22 July 2019.

| 8 August 2019 First leg | Universitatea Craiova (Romania) | 0–2 | (Greece) AEK Athens | Craiova, Romania |
| 19:15 EEST (UTC+3) | Vătăjelu (yellow card) 81' | Report | Mantalos 60', (yellow card) 90+3'; Livaja 85' | Stadium: Stadionul Ion Oblemenco; Attendance: 2,530; Referee: Dennis Higler (Netherlands) |

| 15 August 2019 Second leg | AEK Athens (Greece) | 1–1 | (Romania) Universitatea Craiova | Athens, Greece |
| 21:00 EEST (UTC+3) | Krstičić (yellow card) 22'; Mantalos 26'; Barkas (yellow card) 77'; Svarnas (yellow card) 90'; Verde (yellow card) 90+4' | Report | Mihăilă (yellow card) 45'; Roman (yellow card) 53'; Ivanov 63'; Bancu (yellow card) 68' | Stadium: Olympic Stadium; Attendance: Behind closed doors Referee: Jérôme Brisard (France) |
Note: The match was held behind closed doors, due to the punishment of AEK for the fan incidents during the previous season.

==== Play-off round ====
The draw for the play-off round was held on 5 August 2019.

| 22 August 2019 First leg | AEK Athens (Greece) | 1–3 | (Turkey) Trabzonspor | Athens, Greece |
| 20:00 EEST (UTC+3) | Livaja (yellow card) 1', (goal) 4'; Vranješ (yellow card) 22'; Paulinho (yellow card) 89' | Report | Sosa (penalty missed) 24'; Ekuban 28', 44', 70'; Erdoğan (yellow card) 90+3' | Stadium: Olympic Stadium; Attendance: Behind closed doors Referee: Daniel Siebert (Germany) |
Note: The match was held behind closed doors, due to the punishment of AEK for the fan incidents during the previous season.

| 29 August 2019 Second leg | Trabzonspor (Turkey) | 0–2 (3(a)–3 agg.) | (Greece) AEK Athens | Trabzon, Turkey |
| 19:30 EEST (UTC+3) | Mikel (yellow card) 28'; Pereira (yellow card) 41'; Sarı (yellow card) 68' | Report | Chyhrynskyi (yellow card) 15'; Livaja 24'; Mantalos 30' (pen.), (yellow card) 57'; Vranješ (yellow card) 63'; Krstičić (yellow card) 76'; Bakakis (yellow card) 79'; Lopes (red card) 90+3' | Stadium: Şenol Güneş Stadium; Attendance: 30,490; Referee: Michael Oliver (England) |

== Statistics ==
=== Squad statistics ===
As of 12 September 2020

| No. | Pos | Player | Super League | | Super League Play-offs | | Greek Cup | | Europa League | | Total | |
| No. | Pos | Player | Apps | Goals | Apps | Goals | Apps | Goals | Apps | Goals | Apps | Goals |
Goalkeepers
| 1 | GK | (Greece) Vasilis Barkas | 20 | 0 | 8 | 0 | 1 | 0 | 4 | 0 | 33 | 0 |
| 16 | GK | (Greece) Panagiotis Tsintotas | 7 | 0 | 2 | 0 | 6 | 0 | 0 | 0 | 15 | 0 |
| 30 | GK | (Greece) Georgios Athanasiadis | 0 | 0 | 0 | 0 | 0 | 0 | 0 | 0 | 0 | 0 |
Defenders
| 2 | DF | (Greece) Michalis Bakakis | 23 | 1 | 4 | 0 | 6 | 0 | 1 | 0 | 34 | 1 |
| 3 | DF | (Portugal) Hélder Lopes | 15 | 1 | 8 | 0 | 5 | 0 | 3 | 0 | 31 | 1 |
| 4 | DF | (Greece) Marios Oikonomou | 17 | 1 | 8 | 0 | 2 | 0 | 1 | 0 | 28 | 1 |
| 15 | DF | (Slovenia) Žiga Laci | 1 | 0 | 0 | 0 | 0 | 0 | 0 | 0 | 1 | 0 |
| 19 | DF | (Ukraine) Dmytro Chyhrynskyi | 14 | 1 | 7 | 2 | 4 | 0 | 1 | 0 | 26 | 3 |
| 21 | DF | (Bosnia and Herzegovina) Ognjen Vranješ | 16 | 1 | 2 | 0 | 4 | 1 | 4 | 0 | 26 | 2 |
| 23 | DF | (Sweden) Niklas Hult | 13 | 0 | 1 | 0 | 3 | 0 | 1 | 0 | 18 | 0 |
| 24 | DF | (Greece) Stratos Svarnas | 11 | 0 | 10 | 1 | 7 | 1 | 3 | 0 | 31 | 2 |
| 27 | DF | (Portugal) Paulinho | 13 | 0 | 8 | 0 | 4 | 0 | 3 | 0 | 28 | 0 |
| 31 | DF | (Greece) Konstantinos Stamoulis | 0 | 0 | 0 | 0 | 0 | 0 | 0 | 0 | 0 | 0 |
Midfielders
| 5 | MF | (Poland) Damian Szymański | 7 | 0 | 9 | 1 | 5 | 0 | 0 | 0 | 21 | 1 |
| 6 | MF | (Serbia) Nenad Krstičić | 20 | 1 | 10 | 0 | 6 | 1 | 4 | 0 | 40 | 2 |
| 8 | MF | (Portugal) André Simões | 21 | 2 | 7 | 1 | 5 | 0 | 4 | 0 | 37 | 3 |
| 20 | MF | (Greece) Petros Mantalos | 21 | 6 | 9 | 0 | 7 | 2 | 4 | 3 | 41 | 11 |
| 25 | MF | (Greece) Konstantinos Galanopoulos | 13 | 1 | 0 | 0 | 0 | 0 | 2 | 0 | 15 | 1 |
| 44 | MF | (Bosnia and Herzegovina) Anel Šabanadžović | 6 | 0 | 5 | 0 | 2 | 0 | 0 | 0 | 13 | 0 |
| 51 | MF | (Greece) Giannis Sardelis | 0 | 0 | 0 | 0 | 0 | 0 | 0 | 0 | 0 | 0 |
| 70 | MF | (Greece) Giannis Fivos Botos | 2 | 0 | 0 | 0 | 0 | 0 | 0 | 0 | 2 | 0 |
Forwards
| 7 | FW | (Italy) Daniele Verde | 20 | 4 | 10 | 2 | 5 | 0 | 3 | 0 | 38 | 6 |
| 10 | FW | (Croatia) Marko Livaja | 22 | 6 | 10 | 3 | 6 | 3 | 4 | 3 | 42 | 15 |
| 11 | FW | (Argentina) Sergio Araujo | 5 | 1 | 10 | 2 | 4 | 0 | 0 | 0 | 19 | 3 |
| 14 | FW | (Greece) Christos Albanis | 19 | 2 | 7 | 0 | 6 | 2 | 0 | 0 | 32 | 4 |
| 17 | FW | (Belgium) Victor Klonaridis | 6 | 2 | 1 | 0 | 2 | 0 | 2 | 0 | 11 | 2 |
| 18 | FW | (Portugal) Nélson Oliveira | 19 | 9 | 9 | 5 | 4 | 2 | 4 | 0 | 36 | 16 |
| 52 | FW | (Greece) Efthymis Christopoulos | 0 | 0 | 1 | 0 | 2 | 0 | 0 | 0 | 3 | 0 |
| 53 | FW | (Greece) Theodosis Macheras | 1 | 0 | 1 | 0 | 1 | 0 | 0 | 0 | 3 | 0 |
Left during Winter Transfer Window
| 28 | DF | (Greece) Stavros Vasilantonopoulos | 2 | 0 | 0 | 0 | 1 | 0 | 0 | 0 | 3 | 0 |
| 12 | MF | (Portugal) Francisco Geraldes | 3 | 0 | 0 | 0 | 0 | 0 | 3 | 0 | 6 | 0 |
| 22 | MF | (Portugal) David Simão | 4 | 0 | 0 | 0 | 0 | 0 | 3 | 0 | 7 | 0 |
| 39 | MF | (Spain) Erik Morán | 0 | 0 | 0 | 0 | 0 | 0 | 0 | 0 | 0 | 0 |
| 9 | FW | (Greece) Giorgos Giakoumakis | 13 | 0 | 0 | 0 | 1 | 0 | 2 | 0 | 16 | 0 |
| 77 | FW | (Greece) Christos Giousis | 1 | 0 | 0 | 0 | 0 | 0 | 0 | 0 | 1 | 0 |
| — | FW | (Serbia) Miloš Deletić | 9 | 1 | 0 | 0 | 0 | 0 | 0 | 0 | 9 | 1 |

=== Goalscorers ===
As of 12 September 2020
The list is sorted by competition order when total goals are equal, then by position and then by squad number.

| Rank | No. | Pos. | Player | Super League | Super League Play-offs | Greek Cup | Europa League | Total |
|---|---|---|---|---|---|---|---|---|
| 1 | 18 | FW | (Portugal) Nélson Oliveira | 9 | 5 | 2 | 0 | 16 |
| 2 | 10 | FW | (Croatia) Marko Livaja | 6 | 3 | 3 | 3 | 15 |
| 3 | 20 | MF | (Greece) Petros Mantalos | 6 | 0 | 2 | 3 | 11 |
| 4 | 7 | FW | (Italy) Daniele Verde | 4 | 2 | 0 | 0 | 6 |
| 5 | 14 | FW | (Greece) Christos Albanis | 2 | 0 | 2 | 0 | 4 |
| 6 | 8 | MF | (Portugal) André Simões | 2 | 1 | 0 | 0 | 3 |
| 6 | 19 | DF | (Ukraine) Dmytro Chyhrynskyi | 1 | 2 | 0 | 0 | 3 |
| 6 | 11 | FW | (Argentina) Sergio Araujo | 1 | 2 | 0 | 0 | 3 |
| 9 | 17 | FW | (Belgium) Victor Klonaridis | 2 | 0 | 0 | 0 | 2 |
| 9 | 21 | DF | (Bosnia and Herzegovina) Ognjen Vranješ | 1 | 0 | 1 | 0 | 2 |
| 9 | 6 | MF | (Serbia) Nenad Krstičić | 1 | 0 | 1 | 0 | 2 |
| 9 | 24 | DF | (Greece) Stratos Svarnas | 0 | 1 | 1 | 0 | 2 |
| 13 | 4 | DF | (Greece) Marios Oikonomou | 1 | 0 | 0 | 0 | 1 |
| 13 | 2 | DF | (Greece) Michalis Bakakis | 1 | 0 | 0 | 0 | 1 |
| 13 | 3 | DF | (Portugal) Hélder Lopes | 1 | 0 | 0 | 0 | 1 |
| 13 | 25 | MF | (Greece) Konstantinos Galanopoulos | 1 | 0 | 0 | 0 | 1 |
| 13 | — | FW | (Serbia) Miloš Deletić | 1 | 0 | 0 | 0 | 1 |
| 13 | 5 | MF | (Poland) Damian Szymański | 0 | 1 | 0 | 0 | 1 |
| Own goals | | | | 2 | 0 | 0 | 0 | 2 |
| Totals | | | | 42 | 17 | 12 | 6 | 77 |

=== Hat-tricks ===
Numbers in superscript represent the goals that the player scored.

| Player | Against | Result | Date | Competition | Source |
|---|---|---|---|---|---|
| (Portugal) Nélson Oliveira | (Greece) Panionios | 5–0 (H) | 7 December 2019 | Super League | |

=== Assists ===
As of 12 September 2020
The list is sorted by competition order when total assists are equal, then by position and then by squad number.

| Rank | No. | Pos. | Player | Super League | Super League Play-offs | Greek Cup | Europa League | Total |
|---|---|---|---|---|---|---|---|---|
| 1 | 20 | MF | (Greece) Petros Mantalos | 8 | 3 | 1 | 0 | 12 |
| 2 | 10 | FW | (Croatia) Marko Livaja | 4 | 2 | 3 | 1 | 10 |
| 3 | 18 | FW | (Portugal) Nélson Oliveira | 3 | 0 | 1 | 3 | 8 |
| 4 | 7 | FW | (Italy) Daniele Verde | 3 | 2 | 1 | 0 | 6 |
| 5 | 3 | DF | (Portugal) Hélder Lopes | 2 | 1 | 1 | 1 | 5 |
| 6 | 27 | DF | (Portugal) Paulinho | 2 | 2 | 0 | 0 | 4 |
| 7 | 6 | MF | (Serbia) Nenad Krstičić | 1 | 1 | 1 | 0 | 3 |
| 8 | 4 | MF | (Poland) Damian Szymański | 1 | 0 | 0 | 0 | 1 |
| 8 | 14 | FW | (Greece) Christos Albanis | 1 | 0 | 0 | 0 | 1 |
| 8 | 11 | FW | (Argentina) Sergio Araujo | 0 | 0 | 1 | 0 | 1 |
| 8 | 12 | MF | (Portugal) Francisco Geraldes | 0 | 0 | 0 | 1 | 1 |
| Totals | | | | 25 | 11 | 9 | 6 | 51 |

=== Clean sheets ===
As of 12 September 2020
The list is sorted by competition order when total clean sheets are equal and then by squad number. Clean sheets in games where both goalkeepers participated are awarded to the goalkeeper who started the game. Goalkeepers with no appearances are not included.

| Rank | No. | Player | Super League | Super League Play-offs | Greek Cup | Europa League | Total |
|---|---|---|---|---|---|---|---|
| 1 | 1 | (Greece) Vasilis Barkas | 10 | 4 | 0 | 2 | 16 |
| 2 | 16 | (Greece) Panagiotis Tsintotas | 3 | 0 | 2 | 0 | 5 |
| Totals | | | 13 | 4 | 2 | 2 | 21 |

=== Disciplinary record ===
As of 12 September 2020

| N | P | Nat. | Name | Super League | | | Super League Play-offs | | | Greek Cup | | | Europa League | | | Total | | | Notes |
| N | P | Nat. | Name | Yellow card | Second yellow card | Red card | Yellow card | Second yellow card | Red card | Yellow card | Second yellow card | Red card | Yellow card | Second yellow card | Red card | Yellow card | Second yellow card | Red card | Notes |
Goalkeepers
| 1 | GK | (Greece) | Vasilis Barkas | 1 | | | | | | | | | 1 | | | 2 | | | |
| 16 | GK | (Greece) | Panagiotis Tsintotas | | | | | | | | | | | | | | | | |
| 30 | GK | (Greece) | Georgios Athanasiadis | | | | | | | | | | | | | | | | |
Defenders
| 2 | DF | (Greece) | Michalis Bakakis | 1 | | | | | | | | | 1 | | | 2 | | | |
| 3 | DF | (Portugal) | Hélder Lopes | 5 | | | 2 | | | 1 | | | | | 1 | 8 | | 1 | |
| 4 | DF | (Greece) | Marios Oikonomou | 3 | | | 2 | | | | | | | | | 5 | | | |
| 15 | DF | (Slovenia) | Žiga Laci | | | | | | | | | | | | | | | | |
| 19 | DF | (Ukraine) | Dmytro Chyhrynskyi | 1 | | | 1 | | | 2 | | | 1 | | | 5 | | | |
| 21 | DF | (Bosnia and Herzegovina) | Ognjen Vranješ | 7 | | 1 | | | | 1 | | | 2 | | | 10 | | 1 | |
| 23 | DF | (Sweden) | Niklas Hult | | | 1 | | | | | | | | | | | | 1 | |
| 24 | DF | (Greece) | Stratos Svarnas | 4 | | | 1 | | | 2 | | | 1 | | | 8 | | | |
| 27 | DF | (Portugal) | Paulinho | 4 | | | 3 | | | | | | 1 | | | 8 | | | |
| 31 | DF | (Greece) | Konstantinos Stamoulis | | | | | | | | | | | | | | | | |
Midfielders
| 5 | MF | (Poland) | Damian Szymański | 3 | | | 2 | | | | | | | | | 5 | | | |
| 6 | MF | (Serbia) | Nenad Krstičić | 8 | 1 | | 1 | | | 2 | | | 2 | | | 13 | 1 | | |
| 8 | MF | (Portugal) | André Simões | 9 | 1 | | 1 | | | 4 | 1 | | | | | 14 | 2 | | |
| 20 | MF | (Greece) | Petros Mantalos | 3 | | | 3 | | | 5 | 1 | | 1 | | | 12 | 1 | | |
| 25 | MF | (Greece) | Konstantinos Galanopoulos | 2 | | | | | | | | | | | | 2 | | | |
| 44 | MF | (Bosnia and Herzegovina) | Anel Šabanadžović | 1 | | | 2 | | | 1 | | | | | | 4 | | | |
| 51 | MF | (Greece) | Giannis Sardelis | | | | | | | | | | | | | | | | |
| 70 | MF | (Greece) | Giannis Fivos Botos | | | | | | | | | | | | | | | | |
Forwards
| 7 | FW | (Italy) | Daniele Verde | | | | | | | | | | 1 | | | 1 | | | |
| 10 | FW | (Croatia) | Marko Livaja | 13 | 2 | | 2 | | | 3 | | | 1 | | | 19 | 2 | | |
| 11 | FW | (Argentina) | Sergio Araujo | 2 | | | 1 | | | 2 | | | | | | 5 | | | |
| 14 | FW | (Greece) | Christos Albanis | | | | | | | | 1 | | | | | | 1 | | |
| 17 | FW | (Belgium) | Victor Klonaridis | | | | | | | | | | | | | | | | |
| 18 | FW | (Portugal) | Nélson Oliveira | 2 | | | | | | 2 | 1 | | | | | 4 | 1 | | |
| 52 | FW | (Greece) | Efthymis Christopoulos | | | | | | | | | | | | | | | | |
| 53 | FW | (Greece) | Theodosis Macheras | | | | | | | | | | | | | | | | |
Left during Winter Transfer window
| 28 | DF | (Greece) | Stavros Vasilantonopoulos | | | | | | | | | | | | | | | | |
| 12 | MF | (Portugal) | Francisco Geraldes | 2 | 1 | | | | | | | | | | | 2 | 1 | | |
| 22 | MF | (Portugal) | David Simão | | | | | | | | | | | | | | | | |
| 39 | MF | (Spain) | Erik Morán | | | | | | | | | | | | | | | | |
| 9 | FW | (Greece) | Giorgos Giakoumakis | 1 | | | | | | | | | | | | 1 | | | |
| 77 | FW | (Greece) | Christos Giousis | | | | | | | | | | | | | | | | |
| — | FW | (Serbia) | Miloš Deletić | 1 | | | | | | | | | | | | 1 | | | |

=== Starting 11 ===
This section presents the most frequently used formation along with the players with the most starts across all competitions.

| N. | Formation | Matchday(s) |
|---|---|---|
| 22 | 4–2–1–3 | 1, 3, 7, 10, 11, 13, 23, 25, 26 |
| 14 | 3–5–2 | 2, 4–6, 13, 14–16, 19, 20, 22 |
| 7 | 4–4–2 | 8, 9, 17, 24 |
| 4 | 4–3–3 | 18, 21 |

| No. | Nat. | Player | Pos. |
|---|---|---|---|
| 1 | (Greece) | Vasilis Barkas | GK |
| 21 | (Bosnia and Herzegovina) | Ognjen Vranješ | RCB |
| 24 | (Greece) | Stratos Svarnas | LCB |
| 2 | (Greece) | Michalis Bakakis | RB |
| 3 | (Portugal) | Hélder Lopes | LB |
| 8 | (Portugal) | André Simões | DM |
| 6 | (Serbia) | Nenad Krstičić | CM |
| 20 | (Greece) | Petros Mantalos (C) | AM |
| 7 | (Italy) | Daniele Verde | RW |
| 10 | (Croatia) | Marko Livaja | LW |
| 18 | (Portugal) | Nélson Oliveira | CF |

Last updated: 2020-09-12

== Awards ==
| Player | Pos. | Award | Source |
|---|---|---|---|
| (Portugal) Nélson Oliveira | FW | NIVEA MEN Player of the Month (August) | |
| (Bosnia and Herzegovina) Ognjen Vranješ | DF | NIVEA MEN Best Goal (3rd Matchday) | |
| (Iran) Karim Ansarifard | FW | NIVEA MEN Best Goal (10th Matchday) | |
| (Italy) Daniele Verde | FW | NIVEA MEN Best Goal (13th Matchday) | |
| (Portugal) Nélson Oliveira | FW | NIVEA MEN Player of the Month (December) | |
| (Portugal) André Simões | MF | NIVEA MEN Best Goal (19th Matchday) | |
| (Argentina) Sergio Araujo | FW | NIVEA MEN Best Goal (23rd Matchday) | |
| (Serbia) Nenad Krstičić | MF | NIVEA MEN Player of the Month (February) | |
| (Italy) Daniele Verde | FW | NIVEA MEN Best Goal (25th Matchday) | |
| (Croatia) Marko Livaja | FW | NIVEA MEN Player of the Month (June) | |
| (Croatia) Marko Livaja | FW | NIVEA MEN Player of the Club | |
| (Croatia) Marko Livaja | FW | NIVEA MEN Player of the Regular season | |
| (Croatia) Marko Livaja | FW | Team of the Season | |
