= Georgios Stamoulis =

Greek association footballer

Personal information
- Date of birth: 9 January 2003 (age 23)
- Place of birth: Patras, Greece
- Height: 1.85 m (6 ft 1 in)
- Position: Forward

Team information
- Current team: Kavala
- Number: 23

Youth career
- Olympiacos

Senior career*
Years	Team	Apps	(Gls)
2021–2022	Olympiacos B	0	(0)
2022–2023	Fostiras	5	(0)
2023–2024	AEK Athens B	14	(0)
2024–2025	Othellos Athienou	23	(6)
2025–	Kavala	12	(0)
- * Club domestic league appearances and goals as of 20 April 2026

Georgios Stamoulis (Greek: Γεώργιος Σταμούλης; born 9 January 2003) is a Greek professional footballer who plays as a forward for Super League 2 club Kavala.

== Personal life ==
Stamoulis' older brother, Konstantinos, is also a professional footballer.
