= Miloš Deletić =

Serbian footballer (born 1993)

Personal information
- Full name: Miloš Deletić
- Date of birth: 14 October 1993 (age 33)
- Place of birth: Belgrade, F.R. Yugoslavia
- Height: 1.79 m (5 ft 10 1/2 in)
- Positions: Winger; second striker

Team information
- Current team: Foshan Nanshi
- Number: 24

Youth career
- –2012: Radnički Beograd

Senior career*
Years	Team	Apps	(Gls)
2012	Mladenovac	12	(3)
2012–2013	Vojvodina	7	(1)
2013–2014	Napredak Kruševac	4	(0)
2014–2015	Săgeata Năvodari	24	(4)
2015	Academica Argeş	12	(5)
2015–2016	Jagodina	13	(0)
2016	Radnik Surdulica	14	(2)
2016–2019	AEL	74	(10)
2019–2022	AEK Athens	9	(1)
2020	→ Asteras Tripolis (loan)	9	(2)
2020–2021	→ Lamia (loan)	26	(6)
2021–2022	→ Anorthosis Famagusta (loan)	24	(4)
2022–2024	Volos	49	(10)
2024	Tractor	8	(1)
2024–2025	Panserraikos	29	(0)
2025–2026	Iraklis	14	(4)
2026–	Foshan Nanshi	0	(0)

International career^{‡}
	Serbia U19	2	(0)
- * Club domestic league appearances and goals as of March 22, 2026 ‡ National team caps and goals as of June 18, 2025

Miloš Deletić (Serbian Cyrillic: Милош Делетић, born 14 October 1993) is a Serbian professional footballer who plays as a winger for China League One side Foshan Nanshi.

== Club career ==
=== Early career ===
Despite his young age, Deletić has managed to play in many clubs, mostly of second category. In 2016, he had a very successful season with Radnik Surdulica, a Serbian SuperLiga club, playing as a winger and attacking midfielder.

=== AEL ===
Although the player was claimed from major clubs of Serbia and Turkey, on 26 June 2016, he signed a three-year contract with AEL, thanks to the assistance of the former footballer of the club Slađan Spasić and the then technical director Thomas Kyparissis. His first season was rather disappointing as he did not manage to score in any of his 28 games.

Deletić started the 2017–18 season as an undisputed member of the starting line-up. His first goal for the club came in a home game against Apollon Smyrnis in the late stages of the game, which ended as a 1–0 home win. Almost a month later he scored a brace in a 2–0 away win against Lamia, winning the MVP award as well. On 25 February 2018, he returned to action after a month out with injury and scored the only goal in a 1–0 home win against Platanias. On 5 May 2018, in the last game of the season he scored in a 1–1 home draw with Lamia. He made a total of 30 appearances for the season, scored 5 goals and gave 5 assists, which helped the team comfortably avoid relegation.

In the first game of the 2018–19 season, Deletić scored with a long shot in a 1–0 away win against Apollon Smyrnis. On 20 October 2018, he opened the score in a 2–1 home loss against Lamia. On 11 November 2018, he scored in a 2–0 home win against PAS Giannina.

On 22 November 2018, Deletić allegedly agreed to a three-year contract extension, with a release clause in the region of €500,000. On 9 January 2019, he opened the score in a 3–2 home win against Asteras Tripolis in the Greek Cup round of 16. On 27 January 2019, he scored the equalizer with a fine solo effort in a 1–1 away draw against Panathinaikos, to give his team an important point with ten men in the battle to avoid relegation.

=== AEK Athens ===
On 1 July 2019, AEK Athens officially announced the signing of Deletić on a three-year deal. He scored his first goal for the club away in a derby against PAOK on 29 September. Coming into the game as a second-half substitute, he converted Petros Mantalos' pass to tie the scores at 2–2.

==== Loan to Asteras Tripolis ====
On 31 January 2020, he joined Asteras Tripoli on a six-month loan.

==== Loan to Lamia ====
On 2 October 2020, he joined Lamia on loan, until the summer of 2021, as he wasn't part of Massimo Carrera's plans.

==== Loan to Anorthosis ====
On 23 June 2021, Deletić joined Anorthosis on loan until the end of the 2021–22 season.

=== Volos ===
On 28 June 2022 he signed for Volos.

=== Foshan Nanshi ===
On 17 July 2026, Deletić joined China League One side Foshan Nanshi.

== International career ==
Deletić is also an international with the U-19 Team of Serbia.

== Career statistics ==
As of 12 June 2022

Appearances and goals by club, season and competition
Club	Season	League			National cup (Note: Includes Serbian Cup, Romanian Cup, Greek Cup, Cypriot Cup)		Europe		Other		Total	
Club	Season	Division	Apps	Goals	Apps	Goals	Apps	Goals	Apps	Goals	Apps	Goals
Mladenovac	2011–12	Serbian First League	12	3	0	0	–		–		12	3
Vojvodina	2012–13	Serbian First League	7	1	1	0	–		–		8	1
Napredak Kruševac	2013–14	Serbian First League	4	0	0	0	–		–		4	0
Săgeata Năvodari	2013–14	Liga I	15	2	0	0	–		–		15	2
Săgeata Năvodari	2014–15	Liga I	8	2	1	0	–		–		9	2
Săgeata Năvodari	Total		23	4	1	0	–		–		24	4
Academica Argeş	2014–15	Liga II	12	5	0	0	–		–		12	5
Jagodina	2015–16	Serbian First League	13	0	1	0	–		–		14	0
Radnik Surdulica	2015–16	Serbian First League	14	2	0	0	–		–		14	2
AEL	2016–17	Super League Greece	26	0	2	0	–		–		28	0
AEL	2017–18	Super League Greece	25	5	5	0	–		–		30	5
AEL	2018–19	Super League Greece	23	5	3	1	–		–		26	6
AEL	Total		74	10	10	1	–		–		84	11
AEK Athens	2019–20	Super League Greece	9	1	0	0	0	0	–		9	1
Asteras Tripolis (loan)	2019–20	Super League Greece	9	2	0	0	–		–		9	2
Lamia (loan)	2020–21	Super League Greece	26	6	0	0	–		–		26	6
Anorthosis (loan)	2021–22	Cypriot First Division	24	4	5	0	9	1	1 (Note: Appearance in Cypriot Super Cup)	0	38	5
Volos	2022–23	Super League Greece	32	6	3	0	0	0	0	0	35	6
Volos	2023–24	Super League Greece	19	4	2	0	0	0	0	0	21	4
Volos	Total		51	10	5	0	0	0	0	0	56	10
Tractor	2023–24	Persian Gulf Pro League	4	1	0	0	0	0	0	0	4	1
Career total			292	49	36	1	9	1	1	0	338	51
