= Nélson Oliveira =

Portuguese footballer

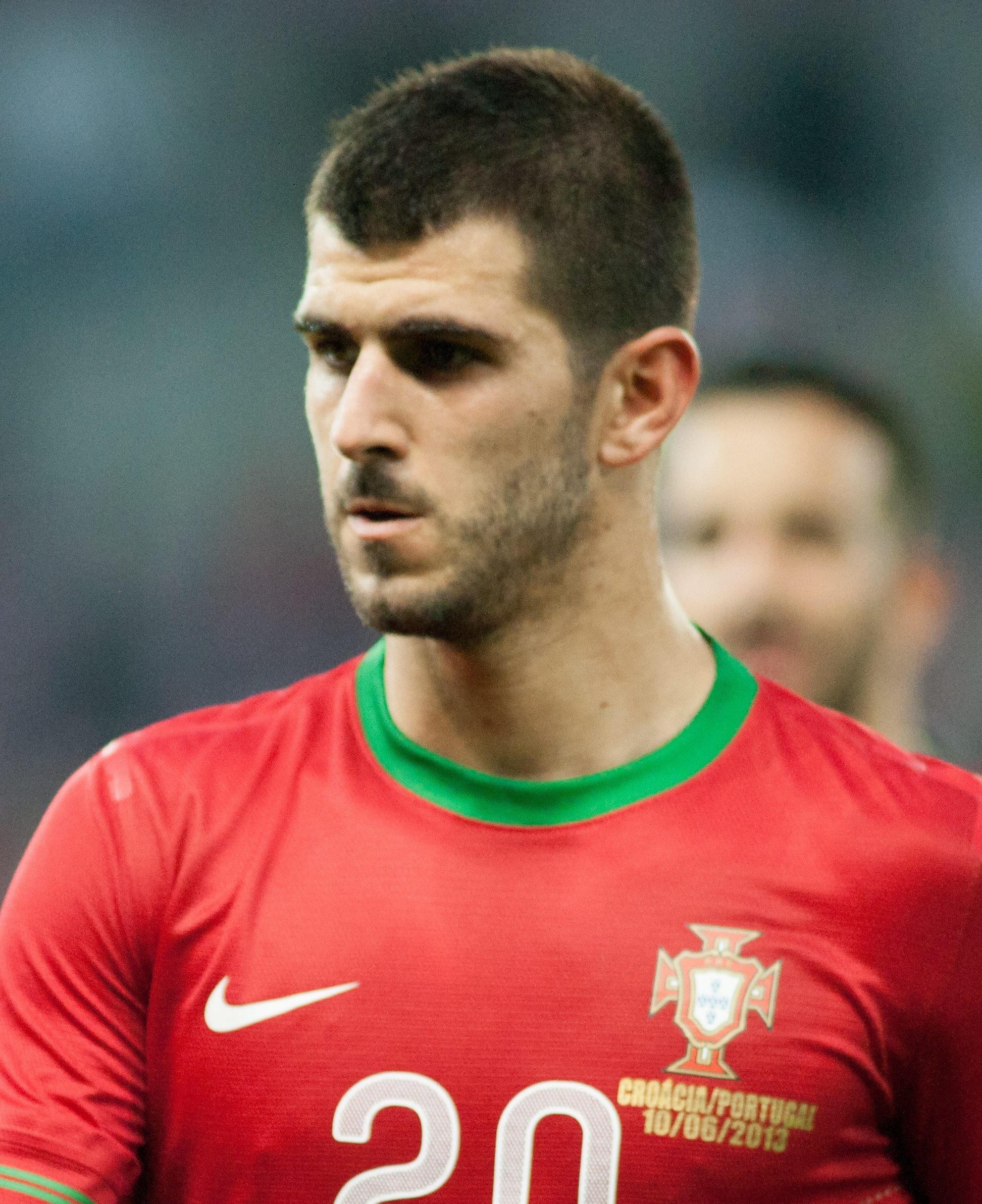
- Oliveira with Portugal in 2013

Personal information
- Full name: Nélson Miguel Castro Oliveira
- Date of birth: 8 August 1991 (age 35)
- Place of birth: Barcelos, Portugal
- Height: 1.86 m (6 ft 1 in)
- Position: Forward

Team information
- Current team: Farense
- Number: 11

Youth career
- 2002–2003: Santa Maria
- 2003–2006: Braga
- 2003–2004: → Bairro Misericórdia (loan)
- 2006–2009: Benfica

Senior career*
| Years | Team | Apps | (Gls) |
| 2009–2016 | Benfica | 12 | (0) |
| 2010 | → Rio Ave (loan) | 10 | (0) |
| 2010–2011 | → Paços Ferreira (loan) | 23 | (4) |
| 2012–2013 | → Deportivo La Coruña (loan) | 30 | (4) |
| 2013–2014 | → Rennes (loan) | 30 | (8) |
| 2015 | → Swansea City (loan) | 10 | (1) |
| 2015–2016 | → Nottingham Forest (loan) | 28 | (9) |
| 2016–2019 | Norwich City | 65 | (19) |
| 2019 | → Reading (loan) | 10 | (3) |
| 2019–2021 | AEK Athens | 52 | (20) |
| 2021–2023 | PAOK | 37 | (7) |
| 2023–2024 | Konyaspor | 15 | (0) |
| 2024–2026 | Vitória Guimarães | 72 | (8) |
| 2026– | Farense | 0 | (0) |

International career^{‡}
| 2006–2007 | Portugal U16 | 9 | (3) |
| 2007–2008 | Portugal U17 | 11 | (3) |
| 2009–2010 | Portugal U19 | 27 | (9) |
| 2010–2011 | Portugal U20 | 19 | (8) |
| 2011–2013 | Portugal U21 | 4 | (2) |
| 2012–2017 | Portugal | 17 | (2) |
Medal record
Men's football
Representing Portugal
UEFA European Championship
| Bronze medal – third place | 2012 Poland-Ukraine |
FIFA U-20 World Cup
| Runner-up | 2011 Colombia |
- * Club domestic league appearances and goals as of 13 September 2026 ‡ National team caps and goals as of 31 August 2017

Nélson Miguel Castro Oliveira CvIH (European Portuguese: [ˈnɛlsõ ɔliˈvɐjɾɐ]; born 8 August 1991) is a Portuguese professional footballer who plays as a forward for Liga Portugal 2 club Farense.

He began his career at Benfica, making 24 appearances and scored three goals for the club, while spending most of his time out on loan. He represented four clubs in English football, and also played in France, Spain and Greece.

Oliveira earned 70 caps for Portugal across all youth levels. He made his debut for the senior team in 2012, and later that year was part of the Portugal squad that reached the semi-finals of UEFA Euro 2012.

== Club career ==
=== Benfica ===
On 12 August 2010, he was loaned to Paços de Ferreira.

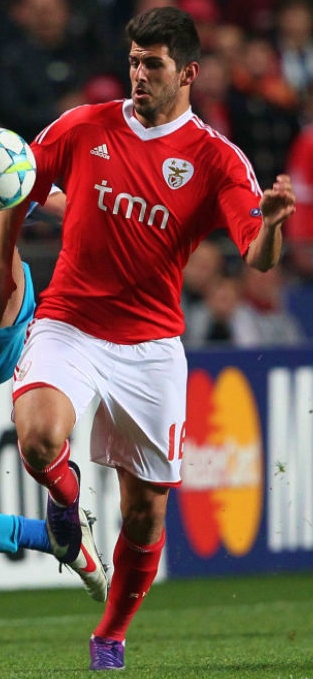
Oliveira playing for Benfica against Zenit in the Champions League, 2012

On 14 October 2011, Oliveira made his debut for Benfica, playing 45 minutes in a 2–0 away win against Portimonense for the season's Portuguese Cup. On 18 January of the following year, he played the entire game against Santa Clara for the League Cup group stage, and scored in a 2–0 home win The following month, in the same competition – the Portuguese Football Federation ruled that, for the tournament, at least two national players would have to appear in a game for 45 minutes – he opened the score against Marítimo (3–0, home).

On 6 March 2012, Oliveira made his Champions League debut, playing only ten minutes but scoring the final goal in a 2–0 home win against Zenit Saint Petersburg, with Benfica qualifying for the last-eight 4–3 on aggregate.

==== Loan to Deportivo La Coruña ====
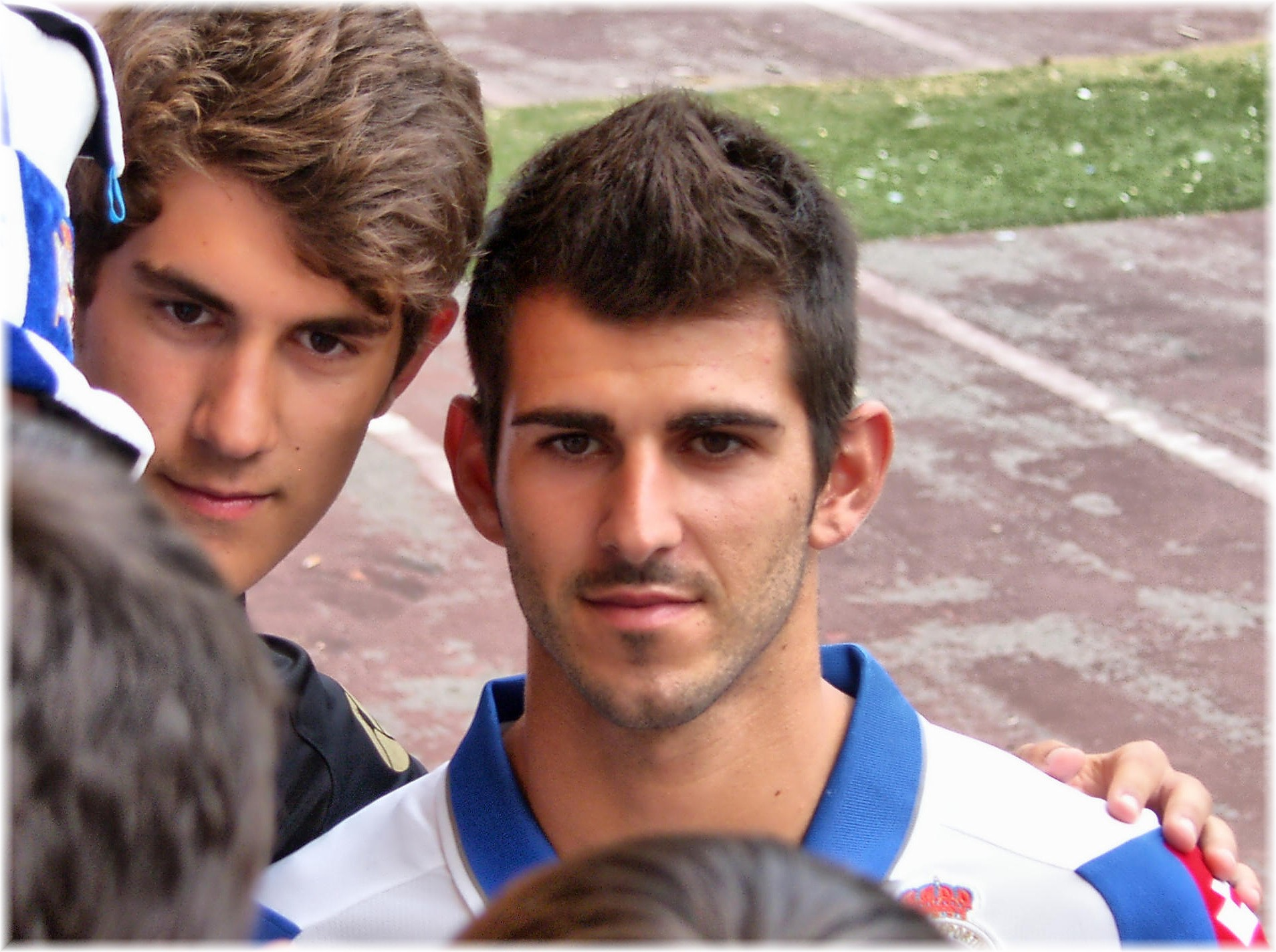
Oliveira being presented at Deportivo in July 2012

On 31 July, he moved to Deportivo La Coruña in Spain in a season-long loan, alongside several compatriots.

On 20 August, in the La Liga opener against Osasuna, Oliveira scored his first goal for the Galicians, from a counter-attack in the 90th minute to make it 2–0 for the hosts. On 19 May 2013, he found himself in controversy after shushing the Ultras after his goal against Espanyol. He later apologized for his actions.

==== Loan to Rennes ====
On 26 July 2013, Oliveira was loaned to Ligue 1 club Rennes on a season-long move, with the French having the option to make the deal permanent afterwards. He scored his first goal in his second appearance, in a 1–2 loss at Nice.

Oliveira scored twice for Rennes on 24 August 2013, in a 2–1 away win against Evian. He again scored twice, this time against Toulouse in a 5–0 win on 26 October 2013. A week later, he scored his seventh goal of the season in a 1–1 draw away to Marseille. After a four-month goal drought, he found the net again against Toulouse in a 3–2 loss on 15 March 2014. He took part of the 2014 Coupe de France Final coming on as a substitute in Rennes' 2–0 loss to Guingamp.

==== Loan to Swansea City ====
On 23 December 2014, Benfica announced that they had loaned Oliveira to Premier League side Swansea City until the end of the season. He was brought in to replace Wilfried Bony, who was due to miss all of Swansea's January matches due to commitments with the Ivory Coast national team at the Africa Cup of Nations. He made his debut on 10 January, replacing Gylfi Sigurðsson for the last 16 minutes of a 1–1 draw against West Ham United at the Liberty Stadium. A week later, with Bony having been sold to Manchester City, Oliveira started alongside Bafétimbi Gomis in a 0–5 defeat to league leaders Chelsea. On 25 April 2015, Oliveira scored his first goal for Swansea, equalising as they came from behind to win 3–2 away at Newcastle United.

==== Loan to Nottingham Forest ====
On 4 September 2015, Oliveira returned to the United Kingdom, joining Nottingham Forest of the Football League Championship on loan for the remainder of the 2015–16 season. He made his debut eight days later away to Queens Park Rangers, replacing Kyle Ebecilio in the 69th minute, and scored the winning goal as they came from behind to triumph 2–1 at Loftus Road.

He had a run of games in the first team but did not score again until 6 November, scoring the only goal of the game against Forest's local rivals Derby County. He added to his goal tally two games later by scoring twice against Reading. The first was a curled strike from 20 yards after a quick counterattack and the second, a volley from close range.

He took his goal tally to five after firing a low curling shot after a deft touch against MK Dons. A week later, he scored against Leeds United.

=== Norwich City ===
On 30 August 2016, Oliveira joined Norwich City on a four-year deal with the club. He became Norwich's fifth signing of the transfer window, signing for an undisclosed fee. He scored his first goal in a 2–2 EFL Cup draw against Leeds United on 25 October, and his first league goal for on 3 December, against Brentford in a 5–0 win at Carrow Road. In the next four games, he found the net on three occasions against Barnsley, Aston Villa and Reading.

On 2 January 2017, Oliveira scored his first professional hat-trick in 3–0 win against Derby County. The following game, he received his first red card after he lashed out on Rotherham United defender Kirk Broadfoot. He returned from suspension, scoring a looping header against Wigan Athletic on 7 February 2017.

In early February, Oliveira sustained a foot injury which caused him to be out for five weeks. He returned from injury on 18 March 2017, as a late substitute against Barnsley. He scored a brace against Leeds United on 29 April 2017, and finished the season with 15 goals in 32 games in all competitions (including Football League Trophy) for Norwich, a career high tally for him.

Oliveira ended his first pre-season in 2017 with Norwich, scoring five goals in eight games. After scoring a late equalizer against Fulham on the first day of the 2017–18 season, after coming on as a substitute on 5 August 2017, he proceeded to take his shirt off and angrily reveal his name towards manager, Daniel Farke. After the game Farke played down the controversy saying emotions got the better of him after being left on the bench. During the 2017-18 season, Oliveira scored 8 goals in 36 appearances (10 as a substitute), finishing as the club's second top scorer behind James Maddison.

The following season, Oliveira was frozen-out from the squad by Farke, after failing to make a move during the summer transfer window.

==== Loan to Reading ====
On 22 January 2019, Oliveira joined fellow Championship side Reading on loan until the end of the season. He made his debut a week later and scored in a 1–1 draw at Bolton Wanderers.

On 2 February 2019, Oliveira was badly injured during a match against Aston Villa when he was tussling for the ball with Villa defender Tyrone Mings; he fell and had his face trod on. Oliveira suffered bad gashes on his face and a broken nose, and was taken to the Royal Berkshire Hospital for treatment. Mings later apologised to Oliveira on Twitter, insisting that it was not intentional; both Oliveira and the Reading coach José Manuel Gomes stated their opinion that Mings could have avoided making contact. As referee Geoff Eltringham had seen the incident and determined that it was accidental, no retrospective action was taken.

=== AEK Athens ===
On 20 July 2019, Oliveira signed a two-year contract with Super League Greece club AEK Athens. He scored a late goal as AEK lost 2–1 at home to Xanthi in the opening match of the season, and scored again the following week in a 3–2 win away to Asteras Tripolis. Oliveira scored twice, including a stoppage-time winner, as AEK came back from a goal behind to beat Atromitos 3–2 on 3 November. On 7 December, he scored a hat-trick in a 5–0 home win against Panionios.

On 16 January 2020, Oliveira returned from an injury and converted a penalty in a 1–1 away draw against Asteras Tripolis in the first leg of the round of 16 of the Greek Cup. The same month, there were Greek reports that Wolverhampton Wanderers had expressed interest in him, to provide reliable backup to Raúl Jiménez. The English club submitted an official offer in the region of €4 million, but it was immediately turned down as AEK would only accept the €6.5 million buy-out clause.

On 5 July 2020, Oliveira netted a brace, in a 4–1 win at the Kleanthis Vikelidis Stadium against Aris. On 24 September 2020, Oliveira scored the only goal with a rebound after he missed a penalty kick sealing a 1–0 away 2020–21 UEFA Europa League third qualifying round win against St. Gallen. On 13 December 2020, he sealed an eventual 4–3 away win against Apollon Smyrnis. The following 15 February, he scored a brace in a 4–2 away win against AEL.

=== PAOK ===
On 9 July 2021, Greek Super League club PAOK announced the signing of Oliveira. On 18 August 2021, Nelson Oliveira was injured during PAOK's match against Bohemians in the UEFA Europa Conference League. Following medical examinations, the diagnosis was a partial rupture of the anterior cruciate ligament, and his absence was estimated to six months. He played his first game upon recovery in April 2022.

=== Konyaspor ===
On 8 September 2023, Oliveira signed a two-year contract with Konyaspor in Turkey.

=== Vitória Guimarães ===
On 24 January 2024, Oliveira returned to Portugal, signing a one-and-a-half-year contract with Primeira Liga club Vitória Guimarães. On 10 January 2026, Oliveira played and captained his team in the Portuguese Taça da Liga final against Braga in which Vitória Guimarães won 2-1.

=== Farense ===
On 19 August 2026, Oliveira signed with Farense, moving to his country's second tier for the first time in his career.

== International career ==
=== Youth ===
Oliveira represented the Portugal under-17 team in the qualification for the 2008 UEFA European Championship. In 2009, he was named in the squad for the European Under-19 Championship qualifying tournament, but the country failed to ensure a place in the finals in Ukraine; the following year, in the same category, he represented the nation at European Championship, scoring one goal in the 2–0 win against Italy.

On 22 May 2011, Oliveira was selected by the under-20s for the 2011 Toulon Tournament, where he played three matches and netted once. He also helped the team finish second in that year's FIFA World Cup held in Colombia, scoring four goals – including one in the final against Brazil, a 2–3 extra time loss – and providing two assists. He received the Man of the match award twice, in addition to the Silver Ball for the second best player in the tournament.

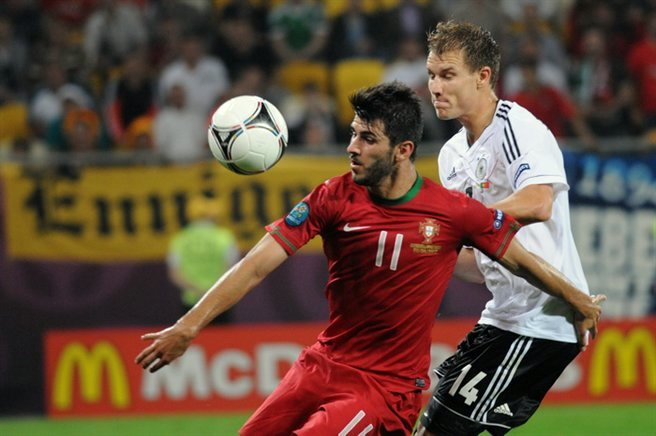
Oliveira playing for Portugal at Euro 2012

Oliveira made his debut for the under-21 team on 6 October 2011, in a Euro 2013 qualification match against Poland. On 11 November, for the same competition, he scored a brace against Moldova (5–0 home win).

=== Senior team ===
On 24 February 2012, Oliveira was called up for the first time to the senior team, for a friendly match with Poland five days later. He replaced Nani for the last ten minutes of the 0–0 draw in Warsaw, and eventually made it to the list of 23 for UEFA Euro 2012.

Oliveira played 20 minutes in the group stage opener against Germany after coming on for Hélder Postiga, in an eventual 0–1 loss. He made three other substitute appearances in the tournament, in an eventual semi-final exit.

In Portugal's next game after Euro 2012, Oliveira scored his first international goal, in a 2–0 win against Panama.

After an absence of nearly two years, Oliveira was called up by Fernando Santos for World Cup qualifiers against the Faroe Islands and Hungary. He replaced André Silva in the eighty-first minute, and three minutes later scored the fifth and final goal of Portugal's 5–1 win against the Faroe Islands.

== Career statistics ==
=== Club ===
As of match played 10 January 2026

Appearances and goals by club, season and competition
| Club | Season | League | | | National cup (Note: Includes Taça de Portugal, Copa del Rey, Coupe de France, FA Cup, Greek Football Cup) | | League cup (Note: Includes Taça da Liga, Coupe de la Ligue, EFL Cup) | | Europe | | Total | |
| Club | Season | Division | Apps | Goals | Apps | Goals | Apps | Goals | Apps | Goals | Apps | Goals |
|---|---|---|---|---|---|---|---|---|---|---|---|---|
| Rio Ave (loan) | 2009–10 | Primeira Liga | 10 | 0 | 2 | 0 | — | | — | | 12 | 0 |
| Paços Ferreira (loan) | 2010–11 | Primeira Liga | 23 | 4 | 1 | 0 | 7 | 1 | — | | 31 | 5 |
| Benfica | 2011–12 | Primeira Liga | 12 | 0 | 3 | 0 | 5 | 2 | 2 (Note: Appearance(s) in UEFA Champions League) | 1 | 22 | 3 |
| Benfica | 2014–15 | Primeira Liga | 0 | 0 | 1 | 0 | 0 | 0 | 1 | 0 | 2 | 0 |
| Benfica | Total | | 12 | 0 | 4 | 0 | 5 | 2 | 3 | 1 | 24 | 3 |
| Deportivo La Coruña (loan) | 2012–13 | La Liga | 30 | 4 | 1 | 0 | — | | — | | 31 | 4 |
| Rennes (loan) | 2013–14 | Ligue 1 | 30 | 8 | 5 | 0 | 1 | 0 | — | | 36 | 8 |
| Swansea City (loan) | 2014–15 | Premier League | 10 | 1 | 1 | 0 | — | | — | | 11 | 1 |
| Nottingham Forest (loan) | 2015–16 | Championship | 28 | 9 | 1 | 0 | 0 | 0 | — | | 29 | 9 |
| Norwich City | 2016–17 | Championship | 28 | 11 | 0 | 0 | 2 | 1 | — | | 30 | 12 |
| Norwich City | 2017–18 | Championship | 37 | 8 | 2 | 0 | 1 | 0 | — | | 40 | 8 |
| Norwich City | Total | | 65 | 19 | 2 | 0 | 3 | 1 | — | | 70 | 20 |
| Reading (loan) | 2018–19 | Championship | 10 | 3 | 0 | 0 | 0 | 0 | — | | 10 | 3 |
| AEK Athens | 2019–20 | Super League Greece | 26 | 14 | 4 | 2 | — | | 4 (Note: Appearances in UEFA Europa League) | 0 | 34 | 16 |
| AEK Athens | 2020–21 | Super League Greece | 26 | 6 | 4 | 2 | — | | 6 | 2 | 36 | 10 |
| AEK Athens | Total | | 52 | 20 | 8 | 4 | — | | 10 | 2 | 70 | 26 |
| PAOK | 2021–22 | Super League Greece | 5 | 0 | 2 | 0 | — | | 2 (Note: Appearances in UEFA Europa Conference League) | 1 | 9 | 1 |
| PAOK | 2022–23 | Super League Greece | 32 | 7 | 4 | 2 | — | | 0 | 0 | 36 | 9 |
| PAOK | Total | | 37 | 7 | 6 | 2 | — | | 2 | 1 | 45 | 10 |
| Konyaspor | 2023–24 | Süper Lig | 15 | 0 | 2 | 0 | — | | — | | 17 | 0 |
| Vitória Guimarães | 2023–24 | Primeira Liga | 15 | 2 | 3 | 0 | — | | — | | 18 | 2 |
| Vitória Guimarães | 2024–25 | Primeira Liga | 31 | 3 | 2 | 0 | 1 | 0 | 13 | 3 | 47 | 6 |
| Vitória Guimarães | 2025–26 | Primeira Liga | 16 | 3 | 3 | 1 | 3 | 1 | — | | 22 | 5 |
| Vitória Guimarães | Total | | 62 | 8 | 8 | 1 | 4 | 1 | 13 | 3 | 87 | 13 |
| Career total | | | 384 | 83 | 41 | 7 | 20 | 5 | 28 | 7 | 475 | 102 |

=== International ===
As of match played 31 August 2017

Appearances and goals by national team and year
| National team | Year | Apps | Goals |
|---|---|---|---|
| Portugal | 2012 | 8 | 0 |
| Portugal | 2013 | 6 | 1 |
| Portugal | 2014 | 0 | 0 |
| Portugal | 2015 | 2 | 0 |
| Portugal | 2016 | 0 | 0 |
| Portugal | 2017 | 1 | 1 |
| Total | | 17 | 2 |

As of 31 August 2017
Scores and results list Portugal's goal tally first, score column indicates score after each Oliveira goal.

List of international goals scored by Nélson Oliveira
| No. | Date | Venue | Opponent | Score | Result | Competition |
|---|---|---|---|---|---|---|
| 1 | 15 August 2012 | Estádio Algarve, Faro, Portugal | Panama | 1–0 | 2–0 | Friendly |
| 2 | 31 August 2017 | Estádio do Bessa, Porto, Portugal | Faroe Islands | 5–1 | 5–1 | 2018 FIFA World Cup qualification |

== Honours ==
=== Club ===
Paços de Ferreira

- Taça da Liga runner-up: 2010–11

Benfica

- Taça da Liga: 2011–12

Rennes

- Coupe de France runner-up: 2013–14

PAOK

- Greek Cup runner-up: 2021–22

Vitória Guimarães

- Taça da Liga: 2025–26

=== International ===
Portugal U20

- FIFA U-20 World Cup runner-up: 2011

=== Individual ===
- FIFA U-20 World Cup: Silver Ball 2011
- Golden Globes (Portugal): Best Newcomer 2012

=== Orders ===
- Knight of the Order of Prince Henry
