= Daniele Verde =

Italian footballer (born 1996)

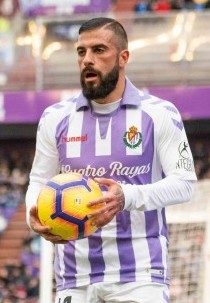
- Verde with Valladolid in 2018

Personal information
- Date of birth: 20 June 1996 (age 30)
- Place of birth: Naples, Italy
- Height: 1.68 m (5 ft 6 in)
- Position: Winger

Team information
- Current team: Fatih Karagümrük
- Number: 10

Youth career
- Pigna
- 2010–2014: Roma

Senior career*
Years	Team	Apps	(Gls)
2014–2019	Roma	7	(0)
2015	→ Frosinone (loan)	6	(0)
2016	→ Pescara (loan)	9	(3)
2016	→ Avellino (loan)	32	(8)
2017–2018	→ Hellas Verona (loan)	30	(2)
2018–2019	→ Real Valladolid (loan)	22	(2)
2019–2021	AEK Athens	30	(6)
2020–2021	→ Spezia (loan)	21	(6)
2021–2026	Spezia	114	(24)
2024–2025	→ Salernitana (loan)	35	(3)
2026	→ Fatih Karagümrük (loan)	8	(1)
2026–	Fatih Karagümrük	8	(1)

International career^{‡}
2014–2015	Italy U19	8	(1)
2015–2016	Italy U20	4	(0)
2015–2018	Italy U21	12	(1)
- * Club domestic league appearances and goals as of 19 October 2026 ‡ National team caps and goals as of 19 November 2018

Daniele Verde (born 20 June 1996) is an Italian professional footballer who plays as a winger for Turkish TFF 1. Lig club Fatih Karagümrük.

== Club career ==
=== Roma ===
Born in Naples, Verde is a youth product from Roma. Verde featured for the A.S. Roma Primavera side that qualified for the knockout stage of the 2014–15 UEFA Youth League, finishing second in their group, Verde scoring twice in the group stage, both coming in wins against CSKA Moscow.

Verde made his senior debut on 17 January 2015 in the Serie A fixture against Palermo, replacing Juan Iturbe after 75 minutes of a 1–1 away draw. On 8 February 2015, Verde starred on his first start for Roma, playing 90 minutes as they won 2–1 away at Cagliari, with Verde assisting both of Roma's goals, for Adem Ljajić and Leandro Paredes.

On 9 July 2015, he was officially transferred on loan to Frosinone. On 6 January 2016, he was transferred on loan to Serie B side Pescara for the remainder of the 2015–16 season. On 15 July, fellow Serie B side Avellino confirmed that Verde had joined on loan from Roma. Verde played from start to finish in Avellino's 2–0 away defeat against Bassano Virtus in round one of the 2016–17 edition of the Coppa Italia on 7 August.

On 8 August 2018, Verde joined La Liga club Real Valladolid on loan until 30 June 2019 with an option to buy.

=== AEK Athens ===
On 16 July 2019, AEK Athens agreed with Roma for the transfer of the young winger to the Greek club for an estimated transfer fee of €1 million, plus a resale rate of 30%. Verde signed a three-year contract, earning €750,000 per year and was given the number 7 shirt, upon request. The following day, AEK Athens officially announced the acquisition of the Italian winger. On 7 December 2019, he scored his maiden goal for the Athens-based club with a free kick which beat Jérémy Malherbe with the help of the right post, in a 5–0 home win game against Panionios. On 5 January 2020, Verde came on after the restart and gave a new wind to the home side, and he added his name to the scoresheet with AEK's second penalty of the game with eight minutes remaining, sealing a 3–1 home win game against Panetolikos. On 23 February 2020, Verde scored a brace with side-footed finish, as a resurgent AEK Athens continued their form with a convincing 3–0 home win over OFI.

On 14 June 2020, he came in as a substitute and scored with a left-footed strike, sealing a 2–0 away win against OFI. On 12 July 2020, he converted a penalty in a 3–1 away win against Panathinaikos.

=== Spezia ===
On 22 September 2020, AEK officially announced that the Italian winger completed a move to Spezia. AEK received €300,000 from the loan, with a mandatory purchase of €800,000.

==== Loan to Salernitana ====
On 13 August 2024, Verde joined Salernitana on loan with an option to buy and a conditional obligation to buy.

==== Loan to Fatih Karagümrük ====
On 6 February 2026, Verde was loaned to Fatih Karagümrük in Turkey, with an option to buy.

== International career ==
On 29 September 2014, Verde received his first call up to the Italy U19 squad for the 2015 UEFA European Under-19 Championship qualifying round fixtures against Armenia, Serbia and San Marino in October 2014. Verde featured in all three game as Italy U19 qualified for the elite round to be played in 2015, scoring in the 3–0 victory against Armenia on 10 October 2014.

He made his debut with the Italy U21 on 12 August 2015, in a friendly match against Hungary.

== Career statistics ==
=== Club ===
As of match played 5 May 2024

Appearances and goals by club, season and competition
Club	Season	League			National cup (Note: Includes Coppa Italia, Copa del Rey, Greek Football Cup)		Continental		Other		Total	
Club	Season	Division	Apps	Goals	Apps	Goals	Apps	Goals	Apps	Goals	Apps	Goals
Roma	2014–15	Serie A	7	0	1	0	2	0	—		10	0
Frosinone (loan)	2015–16	Serie A	6	0	1	0	—		—		7	0
Pescara (loan)	2015–16	Serie B	9	3	0	0	—		—		9	3
Avellino (loan)	2016–17	Serie B	32	8	1	0	—		—		33	8
Hellas Verona (loan)	2017–18	Serie A	30	2	3	2	—		—		33	4
Real Valladolid (loan)	2018–19	La Liga	22	2	4	4	—		—		26	6
AEK Athens	2019–20	Super League Greece	30	6	5	0	3	0	—		38	6
Spezia	2020–21	Serie A	21	6	3	2	—		—		24	8
Spezia	2021–22	Serie A	33	8	1	0	—		—		34	8
Spezia	2022–23	Serie A	25	3	3	3	—		1 (Note: Appearance in the 2022–23 Serie A#Relegation tie-breaker)	0	29	6
Spezia	2023–24	Serie B	29	7	2	0	—		—		31	7
Spezia	Total		108	24	9	5	0	0	1	0	118	29
Career total			244	45	24	11	5	0	1	0	274	56

== Honours ==
AEK Athens

- Greek Cup runner-up: 2019–20
