= Stratos Svarnas =

Greek footballer

Personal information
- Full name: Efstratios Svarnas
- Date of birth: 11 November 1997 (age 28)
- Place of birth: Athens, Greece
- Height: 1.83 m (6 ft 0 in)
- Position: Centre-back

Team information
- Current team: Raków Częstochowa
- Number: 4

Youth career
- 2012–2013: Triglia Rafinas

Senior career*
Years	Team	Apps	(Gls)
2013–2014	Triglia Rafinas	12	(0)
2014–2016	AEK Athens	3	(0)
2016–2018	Xanthi	20	(0)
2018–2023	AEK Athens	65	(1)
2022–2023	→ Raków Częstochowa (loan)	24	(3)
2023–	Raków Częstochowa	86	(4)

International career
2014–2015	Greece U17	3	(0)
2015–2016	Greece U18	5	(0)
2015–2017	Greece U19	10	(0)
2018–2019	Greece U21	2	(0)
2020–2021	Greece	6	(0)
- * Club domestic league appearances and goals as of 23:27, 13 August 2026 (UTC)

Stratos Svarnas (Greek: Στράτος Σβάρνας; born 11 November 1997) is a Greek professional footballer who plays as a centre-back for Ekstraklasa club Raków Częstochowa.

== Career ==
=== Return to AEK Athens ===
On 16 August 2018, reigning Greek champions AEK Athens have re-signed Svarnas from Xanthi, by penning a five-year contract with the young international. Lacking depth in central defence with Ukrainian Dmytro Chyhrynskyi still on the sidelines, the Athenian club strengthen the squad with UEFA Champions League and Superleague commitments approaching. On 5 February 2020, Svarnas headed Marko Livaja’s clever pass across the penalty area into the net, in a 1–1 away Greek Cup draw against Panetolikos. It was his first goal with the club in all competitions.

On 9 July 2020, Svarnas scored helping to a 2–0 home win against OFI, after a nice free-kick from Marko Livaja.

On 22 September 2020, as a reward for his solid performances, he signed a contract extension, running until the summer of 2025.

=== Raków Częstochowa ===
On 18 April 2023, Svarnas signed a four-year deal with Polish club Raków Częstochowa, having already been with the team on loan since July 2022.

== Career statistics ==
=== Club ===
As of match played 27 August 2026

Appearances and goals by club, season and competition
Club	Season	League			National cup (Note: Includes Greek Cup, Polish Cup)		Continental		Other		Total	
Club	Season	Division	Apps	Goals	Apps	Goals	Apps	Goals	Apps	Goals	Apps	Goals
Triglia Rafinas	2013–14	Gamma Ethniki	12	0	0	0	—		—		12	0
AEK Athens	2014–15	Super League Greece 2	3	0	0	0	—		—		3	0
AEK Athens	2015–16	Super League Greece	0	0	1	0	—		—		1	0
AEK Athens	Total		3	0	1	0	—		—		4	0
Xanthi	2016–17	Super League Greece	2	0	1	0	—		—		3	0
Xanthi	2017–18	Super League Greece	18	0	4	0	—		—		22	0
Xanthi	Total		20	0	5	0	—		—		25	0
AEK Athens	2018–19	Super League Greece	5	0	6	0	0	0	—		11	0
AEK Athens	2019–20	Super League Greece	21	1	7	1	3 (Note: Appearances in UEFA Europa League)	0	—		31	2
AEK Athens	2020–21	Super League Greece	30	0	4	0	7	0	—		41	0
AEK Athens	2021–22	Super League Greece	9	0	3	1	2 (Note: Appearances in UEFA Conference League)	0	—		14	1
AEK Athens	Total		65	1	20	2	12	0	—		97	3
Raków Częstochowa (loan)	2022–23	Ekstraklasa	24	3	4	0	5	0	0	0	33	3
Raków Częstochowa	2022–23	Ekstraklasa	5	0	1	0	—		—		6	0
Raków Częstochowa	2023–24	Ekstraklasa	21	1	2	0	6 (Note: Appearances in UEFA Champions League)	0	0	0	29	1
Raków Częstochowa	2024–25	Ekstraklasa	29	2	1	0	—		—		30	2
Raków Częstochowa	2025–26	Ekstraklasa	30	1	4	0	14	1	—		48	2
Raków Częstochowa	2026–27	Ekstraklasa	1	0	0	0	5	2	—		6	2
Raków Częstochowa	Total		110	7	12	1	30	3	0	0	152	11
Career total			210	8	38	3	42	3	0	0	290	14

=== International ===
Appearances and goals by national team and year
National team	Year	Apps	Goals
Greece
Greece	2020	5	0
Greece	2021	1	0
Total		6	0

== Honours ==
AEK Athens

- Football League: 2014–15 (South Group)
- Greek Cup: 2015–16

Raków Częstochowa

- Ekstraklasa: 2022–23
- Polish Super Cup: 2022
