= Konstantinos Stamoulis =

Greek footballer (born 2000)

Personal information
- Date of birth: 29 October 2000 (age 26)
- Place of birth: Patras, Greece
- Height: 1.73 m (5 ft 8 in)
- Position: Right-back

Team information
- Current team: Veres Rivne
- Number: 22

Youth career
- 2014–2020: AEK Athens

Senior career*
Years	Team	Apps	(Gls)
2018–2023	AEK Athens	0	(0)
2020–2021	→ Lamia (loan)	1	(0)
2021–2023	AEK Athens B	40	(0)
2023–2024	Othellos Athienou	35	(0)
2024–2025	Anorthosis Famagusta	26	(0)
2025–	Veres Rivne	30	(1)

International career^{‡}
2018	Greece U19	2	(0)
- * Club domestic league appearances and goals as of 3 June 2026 ‡ National team caps and goals as of 22 February 2018

Konstantinos Stamoulis (Greek: Κωνσταντίνος Σταμούλης; born 29 October 2000) is a Greek professional footballer who plays as a right-back for Ukrainian Premier League club Veres Rivne.

== Career ==
On 27 June 2025 he signed for Veres Rivne in Ukrainian Premier League.

== Personal life ==
Stamoulis' younger brother, Georgios, is also a professional footballer.

== Career statistics ==
As of 27 June 2025

Club	Season	League			Cup		Continental		Other		Total	
Club	Season	Division	Apps	Goals	Apps	Goals	Apps	Goals	Apps	Goals	Apps	Goals
Lamia (loan)	2020–21	Superleague Greece	1	0	1	0	—		—		2	0
AEK Athens B	2021–22	Superleague Greece 2	18	0	—		—		—		18	0
AEK Athens B	2022–23	Superleague Greece 2	23	0	—		—		—		23	0
AEK Athens B	Total		41	0	—		—		—		41	0
Othellos Athienou	2023–24	Cypriot First Division	34	0	2	0	—		—		36	0
Othellos Athienou	Total		34	0	2	0	0	0	—		36	0
Anorthosis Famagusta	2024–25	Cypriot First Division	29	0	3	0	0	0	0	0	32	0
Anorthosis Famagusta	Total		29	0	3	0	0	0	—		32	0
Veres Rivne	2025–26	Ukrainian Premier League	0	0	0	0	0	0	0	0	32	0
Veres Rivne	Total		0	0	0	0	0	0	—		0	0
Career total			104	0	6	0	0	0	0	0	109	0
