= Paulinho (footballer, born 1991) =

Portuguese footballer

Personal information
- Full name: Paulo Sérgio Mota
- Date of birth: 13 July 1991 (age 35)
- Place of birth: Santa Marinha, Portugal
- Height: 1.75 m (5 ft 9 in)
- Position: Right-back

Team information
- Current team: Leixões
- Number: 77

Youth career
- 2001–2009: Porto
- 2009–2010: Leixões

Senior career*
Years	Team	Apps	(Gls)
2010–2012	Leixões	30	(0)
2012–2015	Moreirense	63	(1)
2015–2016	União Madeira	33	(0)
2016–2017	Chaves	14	(0)
2017	Braga	8	(0)
2017–2019	Chaves	55	(0)
2019–2021	AEK Athens	31	(0)
2021	Gil Vicente	9	(0)
2021–2022	Moreirense	29	(1)
2022–2023	Marítimo	10	(0)
2024	Leixões	14	(0)
2024–2025	Académico Viseu	30	(4)
2025–	Leixões	29	(0)

International career
2007	Portugal U16	2	(0)
- * Club domestic league appearances and goals as of 19 June 2026

Paulo Sérgio Mota (born 13 July 1991), known as Paulinho, is a Portuguese professional footballer who plays as a right-back for Liga Portugal 2 club Leixões.

== Club career ==
Born in Santa Marinha (Vila Nova de Gaia), Porto District, Paulinho began his football career with FC Porto, playing for the club from ages 10 to 18. In 2009 he joined another northern side, Leixões SC, where he spent his last year as a junior.

In his second season as a senior with the Matosinhos team, Paulinho appeared in 27 league games (all starts) to help them to a midtable finish in the Segunda Liga. In the summer of 2012, he signed a three-year contract with newly promoted Moreirense F.C. for an undisclosed fee. He made his debut in the Primeira Liga on 26 November, playing the entire 2–2 home draw against Sporting CP.

With the exception of the 2013–14 campaign, Paulinho continued to compete in the top flight the following years, representing in the process Moreirense, C.F. União, G.D. Chaves (two spells) and S.C. Braga. He scored his first goal as a professional on 21 August 2013, helping Moreirense to a 7–0 home rout of Chaves in the second tier.

Paulinho joined Greek club AEK Athens F.C. on 7 June 2019, on a two-year deal with an extension option for another year. He returned to Portugal on 30 January 2021, with Gil Vicente F.C. of the top division.

On 17 August 2021, Paulinho signed a one-year contract with Moreirense. In November 2022, he agreed to a two-year deal at fellow top-tier C.S. Marítimo, but left at the end of his first season following their relegation.

On 31 January 2024, Paulinho returned to both Leixões and the second division. He remained in that league the following seasons, with Académico de Viseu F.C. where he scored a career-best four goals and Leixões.

== Career statistics ==
As of 30 December 2020

Appearances and goals by club, season and competition
Club	Season	League			National cup		League cup		Continental		Other		Total	
Club	Season	Division	Apps	Goals	Apps	Goals	Apps	Goals	Apps	Goals	Apps	Goals	Apps	Goals
Leixões	2010–11	LigaPro	3	0	0	0	0	0	—		—		3	0
Leixões	2011–12	LigaPro	27	0	2	0	3	0	—		—		32	0
Leixões	Total		30	0	2	0	3	0	—		—		35	0
Moreirense	2012–13	Primeira Liga	9	0	1	0	3	0	—		—		13	0
Moreirense	2013–14	LigaPro	24	1	1	0	3	0	—		—		28	1
Moreirense	2014–15	Primeira Liga	30	0	1	0	2	0	—		—		33	0
Moreirense	Total		63	1	3	0	8	0	—		—		74	1
União Madeira	2015–16	Primeira Liga	33	0	1	1	0	0	—		—		34	1
União Madeira	Total		33	0	1	1	0	0	—		—		34	1
Chaves	2016–17	Primeira Liga	14	0	3	0	0	0	—		—		17	0
Chaves	Total		14	0	3	0	0	0	—		—		17	0
Braga	2016–17	Primeira Liga	8	0	0	0	3	0	—		—		11	0
Braga	Total		8	0	0	0	3	0	—		—		11	0
Chaves	2017–18	Primeira Liga	33	0	2	0	1	0	—		—		36	0
Chaves	2018–19	Primeira Liga	22	0	3	0	1	0	—		—		26	0
Chaves	Total		55	0	5	0	2	0	—		—		62	0
AEK Athens	2019–20	Super League Greece	21	0	4	0	—		3	0	—		28	0
AEK Athens	2020–21	Super League Greece	10	0	0	0	—		0	0	—		10	0
AEK Athens	Total		31	0	4	0	—		3	0	—		38	0
Career total			234	1	18	1	16	0	3	0	0	0	271	2
