= Efthymis Christopoulos =

Greek footballer (born 2000)

Personal information
- Full name: Efthymios Christopoulos
- Date of birth: 20 September 2000 (age 26)
- Place of birth: Patras, Greece
- Height: 1.81 m (5 ft 11 1/2 in)
- Position: Forward

Team information
- Current team: Akragas
- Number: 99

Youth career
- 2015–2020: AEK Athens

Senior career*
| Years | Team | Apps | (Gls) |
| 2020–2023 | AEK Athens | 5 | (0) |
| 2021–2023 | AEK Athens B | 36 | (7) |
| 2023–2024 | Panachaiki | 25 | (4) |
| 2024– | Akragas | 5 | (0) |

International career^{‡}
| 2016 | Greece U16 | 3 | (0) |
| 2017 | Greece U17 | 2 | (0) |
| 2020–2022 | Greece U21 | 12 | (1) |
- * Club domestic league appearances and goals as of 17 November 2024 ‡ National team caps and goals as of 11 June 2022

Efthymis Christopoulos (Greek: Ευθύμης Χριστόπουλος, born 20 September 2000) is a Greek professional footballer who plays as a forward for Italian Serie D club Akragas.
