= 2020–21 AEK Athens F.C. season =

AEK Athens
2020–21 season
- Chairman: Evangelos Aslanidis
- Manager: Massimo Carrera (until 22 December); Manolo Jiménez
- Stadium: Athens Olympic Stadium
- Super League: 4th (After play-offs); 3rd (Regular Season)
- Greek Cup: Semi-finals
- UEFA Europa League: Group stage
- Top goalscorer: League: Karim Ansarifard (13); All: Karim Ansarifard (14)
- Highest home attendance: 0*
- Lowest home attendance: 0*
- Average home league attendance: 0*; *All the games were played behind closed doors due to COVID-19 pandemic.
- Biggest win: Zorya Luhansk 1–4 AEK Athens; AEK Athens 4–1 AEL; AEK Athens 3–0 Lamia
- Biggest defeat: AEK Athens 1–5 Olympiacos
Home colours	Away colours	Third colours

The 2020–21 season was the 97th season in the existence of AEK Athens F.C. and the 60th competitive season and sixth consecutive in the top flight of Greek football. The season was affected by the COVID-19 pandemic and all the games were played behind closed doors. They competed in the Super League, the Greek Cup and the Europa League. The season began on 19 September 2020 and finished on 16 May 2021.

== Kits ==
Supplier: Capelli
Sponsor(s): Pame stoixima
Features: LG Corp

Home	Away	Third

== Overview ==
The season started for the first time in three years with the same manager at the team's bench, Massimo Carrera, but in the shadow of the fourth consecutive lost Cup final in September. Theoretically, the club had made changes to improve their roster, buying Damian Szymański who was previously on loan, while signing Ionuț Nedelcearu, Yevhen Shakhov, Levi García, Muamer Tanković and Karim Ansarifard among others, with several of the players that arrived had unknown or with little experience at a high level. On the other hand, Vasilis Barkas, Marios Oikonomou, Niklas Hult, Daniele Verde and Victor Klonaridis departed, while the permanent stay of Ognjen Vranješ and Sergio Araujo once again did not occur. It was also the season that followed the interruption due to the COVID-19 pandemic, which resulted in no actual pre-season preparation during summer with the clubs prioritising the protection of their players and staff from COVID-19 and then organize their competitive plans, while all the games of the season were in front of empty stands.

Luck smiled for AEK, as the draw for the third qualifying round of the UEFA Europa League brought them facing St. Gallen. Due to a busy schedule and the consequences of the pandemic, UEFA had decided that the matches of the qualifying rounds as well as the play-off rounds in all of their competitions would be single-legged. The match was set to be played at Kybunpark and in a nervous and uneventful match, AEK had the initiative, while Garcia's entrance in the second half gave them the boost they needed and at the 73rd minute the Greek club won a penalty, which was taken by Oliveira. Despite the goalkeeper saving the penalty, the Portoguese striker scored in the rebound with a header making the 0–1, which was the final score. In the play-off round, AEK were drawn to face Wolfsburg at the Olympic Stadium. The yellow-blacks started ideally and won a penalty which was saved by the goalkeeper. From that moment on, the Germans started to press and took the lead at the end of half-time. AEK did not give up the match and equalized with an elusive shot from outside the area by Simões. Wolfsburg tried to regain the lead but the defense of AEK held well and in the last counterattack of the match, Livaja served a long precision ball to Ansarifard, who stepped forward, feinted and slotted low to the left and made the 2–1, giving AEK the qualification to the group stage.

UEFA's draw placed AEK Athens in Group G, alongside Braga, Leicester City and Zorya Luhansk. With terrible performances in all matches with the exception of an imposing away victory against Zorya and a good image in the home defeat against Leicester, AEK's European course ended poorly, as they did not manage to claim the qualification and finished last in the group.

AEK were going well in the league, but the turing point where the team's performance fell as the previous seasons was after the trip to Ukraine away game against Zorya. On AEK's return from Luhansk, five players and their manager were diagnosed with COVID-19, with the result that the team suddenly lost its identity and began to display the competitive issues of previous seasons. A series of bad results, some incidents of indiscipline by key players and some questionable choices of the manager brought the first rifts with the management and after a series of poor performances the contract of Massimo Carrera was terminated alongside the resignation of the technical director, Ilija Ivić. The former footballer of the club who had just retired in the summer as a player, Panagiotis Kone, took over as the new technical director and as the new manager, an old acquaintance, Manolo Jiménez in his fourth spell at AEK, with the aim, as in the previous ones, to first improve the defense and then take the team as high as possible. The aftermath of the winter transfer period was the departure of Marko Livaja, after his unwillingness to renew his contract, in which the management reacted by putting him in inactivity from the team and led in his mutual contract termination, while no substantial strengthening was made. At the start the Spaniard seemed to improve the competitive performance, but yet again the team collapsed. In the Cup, after two expected but not easy qualifications against Apollon Smyrnis and Volos, faced another embarrassing elimination from PAOK with two defeats in the semi-finals. The regular season ended with the team struggling to finish third, but the real shock came in the play-offs.

The four defeats both home and away against Olympiacos and PAOK respectively, with a humiliating 1–5 home defeat from the former, made the atmosphere even heavier. It was fortunate for the players, the manager and the administration that the matches were held without crowd that would probably have led to heavy incidents. The team was close to an absolute disaster with a fifth-place finish, which meant the absence from the European competitions, but a 0–1 win at Leoforos Alexandras Stadium, brought AEK finishing fourth, leaving Panathniakos out of the next season's European competitions.

== Management team ==
Position	Staff
Manager	(Spain) Manolo Jiménez
Assistant manager	(Spain) Jesús Calderón Malagón
Assistant manager	(Greece) Nikos Panagiotaras
Goalkeeping coach	(Greece) Chrysostomos Michailidis
Fitness Coach	(Spain) Sebastián López Bascón
Technical director	(Greece) Panagiotis Kone
Academy manager	(Greece) Kostas Tsanas
Academy director	(Greece) Giannis Papadimitriou
U19 Manager	(Greece) Ilias Kalopitas
U17 Manager	(Serbia) Ivan Nedeljković
Head of Scouting	(Greece) Michalis Kasapis
Scout	(Greece) Dimitrios Barbalias
Scout	(Greece) Andreas Lagonikakis
Scout	(Greece) Stathis Tavlaridis
Head of Medical	(Greece) Lakis Nikolaou

- Source: aekfc.gr

== Players ==
=== Squad information ===
NOTE: The players are the ones that have been announced by the AEK Athens' press release. No edits should be made unless a player arrival or exit is announced. Updated 16 May 2021, 23:59 UTC+3.

No.	Player	Nat.	Position(s)	Date of birth (Age)	Signed	Previous club	Transfer fee	Contract until
Goalkeepers
1	Panagiotis Tsintotas	(Greece)	GK	4 July 1993 (aged 27)	2017	(Greece) Levadiakos	Free	2023
16	Vasilios Chatziemmanouil	(Greece)	GK	9 August 1999 (aged 21)	2018	(Greece) AEK Athens U19	—	2025
30	Georgios Athanasiadis	(Greece)	GK	7 April 1993 (aged 28)	2019	(Greece) Asteras Tripolis	Free	2023
99	Georgios Theocharis	(Greece)	GK	30 June 2002 (aged 19)	2020	(Greece) AEK Athens U19	—	2024
Defenders
2	Michalis Bakakis (Vice-captain 2)	(Greece)	RB / LB / CB / RM	18 March 1991 (aged 30)	2014	(Greece) Panetolikos	€250,000	2023
3	Hélder Lopes	(Portugal)	LB / LM / LW	4 January 1989 (aged 32)	2017	(Spain) Las Palmas	Free	2022
5	Ionuț Nedelcearu	(Romania)	CB / DM	25 April 1996 (aged 25)	2020	(Russia) Ufa	€550,000	2024
15	Žiga Laci	(Slovenia) (Hungary)	CB	20 July 2002 (aged 18)	2020	(Slovenia) Mura	€400,000	2023
19	Dmytro Chyhrynskyi (Vice-captain 3)	(Ukraine)	CB	7 November 1986 (aged 34)	2016	(Ukraine) Dnipro Dnipropetrovsk	Free	2021
24	Stratos Svarnas	(Greece)	CB / RB	11 November 1997 (aged 23)	2018	(Greece) Xanthi	Free	2025
26	Nassim Hnid	(Tunisia)	CB	12 March 1997 (aged 24)	2020	(Tunisia) Sfaxien	€600,000	2024
33	Oleh Danchenko	(Ukraine)	RB / RM / LB / LM	1 August 1994 (aged 26)	2021	(Russia) Rubin Kazan	€400,000	2024
37	Vedad Radonja	(Bosnia and Herzegovina)	RB / LB / RM / DM	6 September 2001 (aged 19)	2020	(Croatia) Dinamo Zagreb U19	Free	2025
40	Mario Mitaj	(Albania) (Greece)	LB / LM / LW	6 August 2003 (aged 17)	2020	(Greece) AEK Athens U17	—	2023
88	Stavros Vasilantonopoulos	(Greece)	RB / RM / LM / DM	28 January 1992 (aged 29)	2015	(Greece) Apollon Smyrnis	Free	2021
Midfielders
4	Damian Szymański	(Poland)	CM / DM / AM	16 June 1995 (aged 26)	2020	(Russia) Akhmat Grozny	1,300,000	2024
6	Nenad Krstičić	(Serbia)	CM / DM / AM	3 July 1990 (aged 30)	2019	(Serbia) Red Star	€500,000	2022
8	André Simões (Vice-captain)	(Portugal)	DM / CM	16 December 1989 (aged 31)	2015	(Portugal) Moreirense	Free	2022
20	Petros Mantalos (Captain)	(Greece)	AM / LM / CM / LW / SS / RM / RW	31 August 1991 (aged 29)	2014	(Greece) Xanthi	€500,000	2024
25	Konstantinos Galanopoulos (Vice-captain 4)	(Greece)	CM / DM	28 December 1997 (aged 23)	2015	(Greece) AEK Athens U20	—	2023
28	Yevhen Shakhov	(Ukraine)	CM / AM / DM	30 November 1990 (aged 30)	2020	(Italy) Lecce	Free	2022
51	Giannis Sardelis	(Greece)	AM / CM / RW / LW	3 November 2000 (aged 20)	2018	(Greece) AEK Athens U19	—	2021
Forwards
9	Levi García	(Trinidad and Tobago)	RW / RM / LW / LM / SS / ST	20 November 1997 (aged 23)	2020	(Israel) Beitar Jerusalem	€2,600,000	2025
11	Karim Ansarifard	(Iran)	ST	3 April 1990 (aged 31)	2020	(Qatar) Al-Sailiya	Free	2023
14	Christos Albanis	(Greece)	LW / RW / LM / RM / SS	4 November 1994 (aged 26)	2018	(Greece) Apollon Smyrnis	€400,000	2024
17	Muamer Tanković	(Sweden) (Bosnia and Herzegovina)	LW / SS / RW / LM / RM / ST / AM	22 February 1995 (aged 26)	2020	(Sweden) Hammarby	Free	2024
18	Nélson Oliveira	(Portugal)	ST / SS	8 August 1991 (aged 29)	2019	(England) Norwich City	€1,000,000	2021
35	Michalis Kosidis	(Greece)	ST	9 February 2002 (aged 19)	2021	(Greece) AEK Athens U19	—	2026
52	Efthymis Christopoulos	(Greece)	ST / SS / RW / LW	20 September 2000 (aged 20)	2020	(Greece) AEK Athens U19	—	2023
53	Theodosis Macheras	(Greece)	LW / RW / RM / LM	9 May 2000 (aged 21)	2020	(Greece) AEK Athens U19	—	2026
Left during Summer Transfer Window
12	Bright Enobakhare	(Nigeria) (England)	SS / ST / RW / LW / AM	8 February 1998 (aged 23)	2020	(England) Wolves	Free	2023
Left during Winter Transfer Window
22	Emanuel Insúa	(Argentina) (Spain)	LB / LM	10 April 1991 (aged 30)	2020	(Greece) Panathinaikos	Free	2023
27	Paulinho	(Portugal)	RB / RM	13 July 1991 (aged 29)	2019	(Portugal) Chaves	Free	2021
29	David Simão	(Portugal) (France)	CM / AM / DM	15 May 1990 (aged 31)	2019	(Belgium) Antwerp	€400,000	2022
44	Anel Šabanadžović	(Bosnia and Herzegovina) (United States)	CM / DM	24 May 1999 (aged 22)	2019	(Bosnia and Herzegovina) Željezničar	€450,000	2023
70	Giannis Fivos Botos	(Greece)	AM / CM / LM / RM	20 December 2000 (aged 20)	2018	(Greece) AEK Athens U19	—	2023
10	Marko Livaja	(Croatia)	SS / ST / AM / LW / RW / LM / RM	26 August 1993 (aged 27)	2018	(Spain) Las Palmas	€1,800,000	2021
69	Petar Karaklajić	(Serbia)	LW / RW	1 February 2000 (aged 21)	2020	(Serbia) Proleter	Free	2025

== Transfers ==
=== In ===
==== Summer ====
No.	Pos.	Player	From	Fee	Date	Contract Until	Source
4	MF	(Poland) Damian Szymański	(Russia) Akhmat Grozny	€1,300,000	1 July 2020	30 June 2024	
5	DF	(Romania) Ionuț Nedelcearu	(Russia) Ufa	€550,000	5 October 2020	30 June 2024	
9	FW	(Trinidad and Tobago) Levi García	(Israel) Beitar Jerusalem	€2,600,000^{[a]}	16 September 2020	30 June 2025	
11	FW	(Iran) Karim Ansarifard	(Qatar) Al-Sailiya	Free transfer	25 August 2020	30 June 2023	
12	FW	(Nigeria) Bright Enobakhare	(England) Wolves	Free transfer	1 July 2020	30 June 2023	
16	GK	(Greece) Vasilios Chatziemmanouil	(Greece) Fostiras	Loan return	1 July 2020	30 June 2021	
17	FW	(Sweden) Muamer Tanković	(Sweden) Hammarby	Free transfer	6 October 2020	30 June 2024	
22	DF	(Argentina) Emanuel Insúa	(Greece) Panathinaikos	Free transfer	13 August 2020	30 June 2023	
26	DF	(Tunisia) Nassim Hnid	(Tunisia) Sfaxien	€600,000	20 August 2020	30 June 2024	
28	MF	(Ukraine) Yevhen Shakhov	(Italy) Lecce	Free transfer	19 September 2020	30 June 2022	
29	MF	(Portugal) David Simão	(Israel) Hapoel Be'er Sheva	Loan return	31 July 2020	30 June 2022	
37	DF	(Bosnia and Herzegovina) Vedad Radonja	(Croatia) Dinamo Zagreb U19	Free transfer	18 September 2020	30 June 2025	
40	DF	(Albania) Mario Mitaj	(Greece) AEK Athens U17	Promotion	12 August 2020	30 June 2023	
69	FW	(Serbia) Petar Karaklajić	(Serbia) Proleter	Free transfer	7 August 2020	30 June 2025	
88	DF	(Greece) Stavros Vasilantonopoulos	(Poland) Górnik Zabrze	Loan return	31 July 2020	30 June 2021	
99	GK	(Greece) Georgios Theocharis	(Greece) AEK Athens U19	Promotion	27 August 2020	30 June 2024	
—	GK	(Greece) Panagiotis Ginis	(Greece) Aspropyrgos	Loan return	1 July 2020	30 June 2023	
—	GK	(Greece) Thanasis Pantos	(Greece) Ethnikos Piraeus	Loan return	1 July 2020	30 June 2020	
—	DF	(Greece) Michalis Bousis	(Greece) Ergotelis	Loan return	1 July 2020	30 June 2023	
—	DF	(Greece) Georgios Kornezos	(Greece) Ionikos	Loan return	1 July 2020	30 June 2024	
—	DF	(Greece) Georgios Giannoutsos	(Cyprus) Alki Oroklini	Loan return	1 July 2020	30 June 2021	
—	MF	(Greece) Paris Babis	(Greece) Platanias	Loan return	1 July 2020	30 June 2022	
—	FW	(Serbia) Miloš Deletić	(Greece) Asteras Tripolis	Loan return	1 July 2020	30 June 2022	
—	FW	(Greece) Christos Giousis	(Greece) Platanias	Loan return	1 July 2020	30 June 2022	
—	FW	(Greece) Giannis Iatroudis	(Greece) Ergotelis	Free transfer	7 August 2020	30 June 2024	
—	FW	(Greece) Giorgos Giakoumakis	(Poland) Górnik Zabrze	Loan return	1 July 2020	30 June 2021	

==== Winter ====
No.	Pos.	Player	From	Fee	Date	Contract Until	Source
33	DF	(Ukraine) Oleh Danchenko	(Russia) Rubin Kazan	€400,000	31 January 2021	30 June 2024	
35	FW	(Greece) Michalis Kosidis	(Greece) AEK Athens U19	Promotion	2 February 2021	30 June 2026	

=== Out ===
==== Summer ====
No.	Pos.	Player	To	Fee	Date	Source
1	GK	(Greece) Vasilis Barkas	(Scotland) Celtic	€5,000,000^{[b]}	30 July 2020	
4	DF	(Greece) Marios Oikonomou	(Denmark) Copenhagen	€1,000,000	3 September 2020	
11	FW	(Argentina) Sergio Araujo	(Spain) Las Palmas	Loan return	31 July 2020	
12	FW	(Nigeria) Bright Enobakhare	Free agent	Contract termination	5 October 2020	
17	FW	(Belgium) Victor Klonaridis	(Cyprus) APOEL	End of contract	7 July 2020	
21	DF	(Bosnia and Herzegovina) Ognjen Vranješ	(Belgium) Anderlecht	Loan termination	16 June 2020	
23	DF	(Sweden) Niklas Hult	(Germany) Hannover 96	End of contract	28 August 2020	
—	GK	(Greece) Thanasis Pantos	(Greece) Kallithea	End of contract	30 July 2020	
—	FW	(Greece) Giorgos Giakoumakis	(Netherlands) VVV-Venlo	€200,000^{[c]}	11 August 2020	

==== Winter ====
No.	Pos.	Player	To	Fee	Date	Source
27	DF	(Portugal) Paulinho	(Portugal) Gil Vicente	Contract termitation	26 January 2021	
10	FW	(Croatia) Marko Livaja	(Croatia) Hajduk Split	Contract termitation	17 February 2021	

=== Loan out ===
==== Summer ====
No.	Pos.	Player	To	Fee	Date	Until	Option to buy	Source
7	FW	(Italy) Daniele Verde	(Italy) Spezia	€300,000	26 September 2020	30 June 2021	✓	
31	DF	(Greece) Konstantinos Stamoulis	(Greece) Lamia	Free	1 October 2020	30 June 2021	✗	
—	GK	(Greece) Panagiotis Ginis	(Greece) Ionikos	Free	12 September 2020	30 June 2021	✗	
—	DF	(Greece) Georgios Kornezos	(Greece) Asteras Vlachioti	Free	13 August 2020	30 June 2021	✗	
—	DF	(Greece) Michalis Bousis	(Greece) Apollon Larissa	Free	6 October 2020	30 June 2021	✗	
—	DF	(Greece) Georgios Giannoutsos	(Greece) Episkopi	Free	6 October 2020	30 June 2021	✗	
—	MF	(Greece) Paris Babis	(Greece) Apollon Larissa	Free	6 October 2020	30 June 2021	✗	
—	FW	(Greece) Giannis Iatroudis	(Netherlands) Volendam	Free	2 October 2020	30 June 2021	✗	
—	FW	(Serbia) Miloš Deletić	(Greece) Lamia	Free	2 October 2020	30 June 2021	✗	
—	FW	(Greece) Christos Giousis	(Greece) Panachaiki	Free	5 October 2020	30 June 2021	✗	

==== Winter ====
No.	Pos.	Player	To	Fee	Date	Until	Option to buy	Source
22	DF	(Argentina) Emanuel Insúa	(Argentina) Aldosivi	Free	16 February 2021	30 June 2021	✓	
30	MF	(Portugal) David Simão	(Portugal) Moreirense	Free	2 January 2021	30 June 2021	✓	
44	MF	(Bosnia and Herzegovina) Anel Šabanadžović	(Bosnia and Herzegovina) Željezničar	Free	3 March 2021	30 June 2021	✗	
69	FW	(Serbia) Petar Karaklajić	(Serbia) Rad	Free	12 January 2021	30 June 2021	✗	
70	MF	(Greece) Giannis Fivos Botos	(Netherlands) Go Ahead Eagles	Free	30 December 2020	30 June 2022	✗	

Notes

a. Beitar Jerusalem keeps 40% of the player's rights.

b. plus €1,000,000 bonuses.

c. plus 15% of resale fee.

=== Contract renewals ===
No.	Pos.	Player	Date	Former Exp. Date	New Exp. Date	Source
14	FW	(Greece) Christos Albanis	7 January 2021	30 June 2021	30 June 2024	
16	GK	(Greece) Vasilios Chatziemmanouil	10 August 2020	30 June 2021	30 June 2025	
20	MF	(Greece) Petros Mantalos	15 June 2021	30 June 2022	30 June 2024	
24	DF	(Greece) Stratos Svarnas	22 September 2020	30 June 2023	30 June 2025	
25	MF	(Greece) Konstantinos Galanopoulos	25 August 2020	30 June 2021	30 June 2023	
40	DF	(Albania) Mario Mitaj	2 February 2021	30 June 2023	31 December 2023	
53	FW	(Greece) Theodosis Macheras	2 February 2021	30 June 2023	30 June 2026	

=== Overall transfer activity ===
==== Expenditure ====
Summer: ▼€5,050,000

Winter: ▼€400,000

Total: ▼€5,050,000

==== Income ====
Summer: ▲€6,500,000

Winter: ▲€0

Total: ▲€6,500,000

==== Net Totals ====
Summer: ▲€1,450,000

Winter: ▼€400,000

Total: ▲€1,050,000

== Pre-season and friendlies ==
23 August 2020 Friendly	AEK Athens	1–2	Atromitos	Marousi
19:00 EEST (UTC+3)	Paulinho 26'	Report	Svarnas 16' (o.g.); Umbides 57' (pen.)	Stadium: Olympic Stadium; Attendance: Behind closed doors Referee: Angelos Evangelou (Athens)

10 October 2020 Friendly	AEK Athens	2–0	Ionikos	Spata
17:00 EEST (UTC+3)	Hnid 16'; Livaja 72' (pen.)	Report		Stadium: Spata Training Centre; Attendance: Behind closed doors

== Competitions ==
=== Overall record ===
Competition	First match	Last match	Starting round	Final position	Record							
Competition	First match	Last match	Starting round	Final position	Pld	W	D	L	GF	GA	GD	Win %
Super League	19 September 2020	14 March 2021	Matchday 1	3rd	26	14	4	8	41	29	+12	53.85
Super League Play-offs	21 March 2021	16 May 2021	Matchday 1	4th	10	3	3	4	12	16	−4	30.00
Greek Cup	20 January 2021	29 April 2021	Sixth round	Semi-finals	6	2	0	4	8	8	+0	33.33
UEFA Europa League	24 September 2020	10 December 2020	Third qualifying round	Group stage	8	3	0	5	10	16	−6	37.50
Total					50	22	7	21	71	69	+2	44.00

Last updated: 16 May 2021
Source: Competitions

=== Super League Greece ===
==== Regular season ====
===== League table =====
Pos	Team	Pld	W	D	L	GF	GA	GD	Pts	Qualification
1	Olympiacos	26	21	4	1	64	13	+51	67	Qualification for the Play-off round
2	Aris	26	15	6	5	34	16	+18	51	Qualification for the Play-off round
3	AEK Athens	26	14	6	6	41	29	+12	48	Qualification for the Play-off round
4	PAOK	26	13	8	5	49	26	+23	47	Qualification for the Play-off round
5	Panathinaikos	26	13	6	7	30	19	+11	45	Qualification for the Play-off round

Source: Super League Greece
Rules for classification: 1) Points; 2) Head-to-head points; 3) Head-to-head goal difference; 4) Goals scored; 5) Goals against.

===== Results summary =====
Overall								Home						Away					
Pld	W	D	L	GF	GA	GD	Pts	W	D	L	GF	GA	GD	W	D	L	GF	GA	GD
26	14	6	6	41	29	+12	48	6	4	3	21	15	+6	8	2	3	20	14	+6

Last updated: 2021-03-14.
Source: Super League Greece

===== Results by Matchday =====
Round	1	2	3	4	5	6	7	8	9	10	11	12	13	14	15	16	17	18	19	20	21	22	23	24	25	26
Ground	H	A	H	A	H	A	H	A	H	A	H	A	H	A	H	A	H	A	H	A	H	A	H	A	H	A
Result	D	W	W	L	D	W	W	W	W	W	L	W	D	L	W	W	W	D	L	W	L	W	D	D	W	L
Position	4	5	2	5	5	4	3	4	4	4	4	4	4	4	4	2	2	2	3	2	4	3	4	4	3	3

Updated to match(es) played on 14 March 2021. Source: slgr.gr
A = Away; H = Home; W = Win; D = Draw; L = Loss; P = Postponed

===== Matches =====
16 December 2020 1	AEK Athens	1–1	Olympiacos	Marousi
19:30 EET (UTC+2)	Simões (yellow card) 35', (goal) 80'; Krstičić (yellow card) 64'	Report	Vrousai 57'	Stadium: Olympic Stadium; Attendance: Behind closed doors Referee: Andris Treimanis (Latvia); Man of the Match: André Simões
Note: The match was postponed to 16 December due to the 2020 cup final between the two teams.

19 September 2020 2	Panetolikos	0–2	AEK Athens	Agrinio
20:30 EEST (UTC+3)	Karasalidis (yellow card) 21'; Díaz (penalty missed) 73'	Report	Hnid (yellow card) 15'; Svarnas (yellow card) 20'; Oliveira (yellow card) 38'; Livaja (yellow card) 40', (goal) 68'; Paulinho (yellow card) 49'; Chyhrynskyi (yellow card) 74'; Mantalos 87'	Stadium: Panetolikos Stadium; Attendance: Behind closed doors Referee: Praxitelis Zachariadis (Macedonia); Man of the Match: Panagiotis Tsintotas

27 September 2020 3	AEK Athens	3–0	Lamia	Marousi
20:30 EEST (UTC+3)	García 14'; Svarnas (yellow card) 45+1'; Krstičić 65'; Enobakhare 85'	Report	Saramantas (yellow card) 67'	Stadium: Olympic Stadium; Attendance: Behind closed doors Referee: Athanasios Tzilos (Larissa); Man of the Match: Theodosis Macheras

4 October 2020 4	Atromitos	1–0	AEK Athens	Peristeri
21:45 EEST (UTC+3)	Goutas 24', (yellow card) 76'; Salomon (yellow card) 38'	Report	Lopes (yellow card) 29'; Mantalos (red card) 39'; Krstičić (yellow card) 67'	Stadium: Peristeri Stadium; Attendance: Behind closed doors Referee: Anastasios Papapetrou (Athens); Man of the Match: Charis Charisis

18 October 2020 5	AEK Athens	1–1	PAOK	Marousi
20:30 EEST (UTC+3)	Ansarifard 23'; Nedelcearu (yellow card) 40'; Krstičić (yellow card) 45+1'; Shakhov (yellow card) 77'; Livaja (yellow card) 84'	Report	Michailidis (yellow card) 55'; Murg 89'	Stadium: Olympic Stadium; Attendance: Behind closed doors Referee: Tobias Stieler (Germany); Man of the Match: Karim Ansarifard

25 October 2020 6	PAS Giannina	0–1	AEK Athens	Ioannina
20:30 EET (UTC+2)	Choutesiotis (yellow card) 15'; Kartalis (yellow card) 56'; Siontis (yellow card) 57'; Fabry (yellow card) 68'	Report	Ansarifard 16' (pen.), (yellow card) 52'; Tanković (yellow card) 47'; Krstičić (yellow card) 69'; Tsintotas (yellow card) 90+4'; Insúa (yellow card) 90+5'	Stadium: Zosimades Stadium; Attendance: Behind closed doors Referee: Aris Diamantopoulos (Arcadia); Man of the Match: Nassim Hnid

1 November 2020 7	AEK Athens	2–1	OFI	Marousi
20:30 EET (UTC+2)	Nedelcearu 34'; Shakhov 74'; Krstičić (yellow card) 84'	Report	Sturgeon 6'	Stadium: Olympic Stadium; Attendance: Behind closed doors Referee: Aristomenis Koutsiaftis (Arta); Man of the Match: Yevhen Shakhov

14 January 2021 8	Aris	0–1	AEK Athens	Thessaloniki
19:30 EET (UTC+2)	Benalouane (yellow card) 90+1'; Sundgren (yellow card) 90+4'	Report	Krstičić (yellow card) 30'; García 64'; Livaja (yellow card) 69'; Ansarifard (yellow card) 74'; Galanopoulos (yellow card) 86'	Stadium: Kleanthis Vikelidis Stadium; Attendance: Behind closed doors Referee: Ivan Bebek (Croatia); Man of the Match: Levi García
Note: The game was schuduled for 8 November but was postponed to 14 January, due to COVID-19 cases in the squad of AEK.

22 November 2020 9	AEK Athens	4–1	AEL	Rizoupoli
15:00 EET (UTC+2)	Nedelcearu (yellow card) 29'; Macheras 55'; Simões (yellow card) 70', (goal) 78'; Ansarifard 72'; Galanopoulos 89'	Report	Platellas (yellow card) 48'; Sparv 68'	Stadium: Georgios Kamaras Stadium; Attendance: Behind closed doors Referee: Vasilis Fotias (Pella); Man of the Match: Theodosis Macheras
Note: Change of venue due to unavailability of the Olympic Stadium.

29 November 2020 10	Asteras Tripolis	1–2	AEK Athens	Tripoli
19:30 EET (UTC+2)	Barrales 44', (yellow card) 52'	Report	Livaja 13'; Insúa (yellow card) 32'; Ansarifard 58'; Krstičić (yellow card) 90+1'	Stadium: Theodoros Kolokotronis Stadium; Attendance: Behind closed doors Referee: Ioannis Papadopoulos (Macedonia); Man of the Match: Marko Livaja

6 December 2020 11	AEK Athens	1–2	Panathinaikos	Marousi
19:30 EET (UTC+2)	Livaja (yellow card) 19'; Krstičić (yellow card) 40'; Insúa (yellow card) 75'; Oliveira 87'	Report	Macheda 34', (yellow card) 67'; Villafáñez (yellow card) 44'; Kourbelis 45+2'; Zagaritis (yellow card) 60'; Carlitos (yellow card) 90+5'; Dioudis (yellow card) 90+6'	Stadium: Olympic Stadium; Attendance: Behind closed doors Referee: Irfan Peljto (Bosnia and Herzegovina); Man of the Match: Lucas Villafáñez

13 December 2020 12	Apollon Smyrnis	3–4	AEK Athens	Rizoupoli
17:15 EET (UTC+2)	Fernández 8'; Ioannidis (yellow card) 44'; Tsabouris 66'; Lagos (yellow card) 44'; Baxevanidis 90+3'	Report	Ansarifard 6', 25'; García 19'; Tanković (yellow card) 70'; Insúa (yellow card) 84'; Oliveira 88'	Stadium: Georgios Kamaras Stadium; Attendance: Behind closed doors Referee: Efstathios Gortsilas (Macedonia); Man of the Match: Karim Ansarifard

21 December 2020 13	AEK Athens	2–2	Volos	Rizoupoli
19:30 EET (UTC+2)	Tanković 7'; Mantalos (yellow card) 17'; Oliveira (yellow card) 45+3'; Paulinho (yellow card) 52' (yellow-red card) 74'; Ansarifard 70'; Shakhov (red card) 86'	Report	Ferrari 16'; Warda 34'; Bartolo (yellow card) 52'; Colombo (red card) 85'; Barrientos (yellow card) 90+2'; Rienstra (yellow card) 90+4'	Stadium: Georgios Kamaras Stadium; Attendance: Behind closed doors Referee: Anastasios Sidiropoulos (Dodecanese); Man of the Match: Julián Bartolo
Note: Change of venue due to unavailability of the Olympic Stadium.

3 January 2021 14	Olympiacos	3–0	AEK Athens	Piraeus
19:30 EET (UTC+2)	El-Arabi 13', 68'; Bruma (yellow card) 60'; Ba (yellow card) 80'; Semedo (yellow card) 86'; Valbuena 90+4' (pen.)	Report	Chyhrynskyi (yellow card) 45+2'; Mantalos (yellow card) 52'	Stadium: Karaiskakis Stadium; Attendance: Behind closed doors Referee: Danny Makkelie (Netherlands); Man of the Match: Youssef El-Arabi

6 January 2021 15	AEK Athens	1–0	Panetolikos	Marousi
17:15 EET (UTC+2)	Shakhov (yellow card) 36'; Galanopoulos 41'; Insúa (yellow card) 86'	Report	Malis (yellow card) 39'; Liavas (yellow card) 43'; Medina (yellow card) 89'	Stadium: Olympic Stadium; Attendance: Behind closed doors Referee: Evangelos Manouhos (Argolida); Man of the Match: Konstantinos Galanopoulos

11 January 2021 16	Lamia	0–1	AEK Athens	Lamia
19:30 EET (UTC+2)	Romanić (yellow card) 25'; Vasilakakis (yellow card) 44'; Tzandaris (yellow card) 66'	Report	Ansarifard 9'; Insúa (red card) 53'; Oliveira (yellow card) 68'	Stadium: Lamia Municipal Stadium; Attendance: Behind closed doors Referee: Aristomenis Koutsiaftis (Arta); Man of the Match: Karim Ansarifard

17 January 2021 17	AEK Athens	2–1	Atromitos	Marousi
21:30 EET (UTC+2)	García (yellow card) 35'; Livaja (yellow card) 46', (goal) 73'; Oliveira 63' (pen.)	Report	Stroungis (yellow card) 35'; Charisis (yellow card) 60'; Salomon (yellow card) 62'; Galo (yellow card) 65'; Goutas (yellow card) 79'; Christodoulopoulos 89' (pen.)	Stadium: Olympic Stadium; Attendance: Behind closed doors Referee: Dimitris Karantonis (Imathia); Man of the Match: Marko Livaja

24 January 2021 18	PAOK	2–2	AEK Athens	Thessaloniki
19:30 EET (UTC+2)	Ingason (yellow card) 12'; Crespo 40'; Tzolis (yellow card) 57'; Vieirinha 70'; Warda (yellow card) 78'; El Kaddouri (yellow card) 90+7'	Report	Shakhov 18'; Livaja (yellow card) 38'; Bakakis (yellow card) 40'; Galanopoulos 50'; Lopes (yellow card) 78'	Stadium: Toumba Stadium; Attendance: Behind closed doors Referee: Slavko Vinčić (Slovenia); Man of the Match: Vieirinha

27 January 2021 19	AEK Athens	0–2	PAS Giannina	Marousi
17:15 EET (UTC+2)	Insúa (yellow card) 21'; Chyhrynskyi (yellow card) 34'	Report	Križman 33' (pen.); Kargas (yellow card) 53'; Ikonomopoulos (yellow card) 73'; Lodygin (yellow card) 82'; Léo 87'; Eleftheriadis (yellow card) 88'	Stadium: Olympic Stadium; Attendance: Behind closed doors Referee: Evangelos Manouhos (Argolida); Man of the Match: Marvin Peersman

31 January 2021 20	OFI	0–2	AEK Athens	Heraklion
15:00 EET (UTC+2)		Report	Szymański (yellow card) 20'; Laci (yellow card) 39'; Shakhov 43'; García (yellow card) 45'; Tanković 71'	Stadium: Theodoros Vardinogiannis Stadium; Attendance: Behind closed doors Referee: Praxitelis Zachariadis (Macedonia); Man of the Match: Yevhen Shakhov

7 February 2021 21	AEK Athens	0–2	Aris	Marousi
19:30 EET (UTC+2)	Simões (yellow card) 23'; Lopes (yellow card) 53'; Krstičić (yellow card) 54'	Report	Rose 29'; Sundgren (yellow card) 81'; Manos (yellow card) 89'; Silva 90+1'	Stadium: Olympic Stadium; Attendance: Behind closed doors Referee: Andris Treimanis (Latvia); Man of the Match: James Jeggo

15 February 2021 22	AEL	2–4	AEK Athens	Larissa
17:15 EET (UTC+2)	Nikolias 70'; Acuña 80'; Jakimovski (yellow card) 90+5'; Moukandjo (penalty missed) 90+6'	Report	Nedelcearu (yellow card) 3'; Oliveira 14' (pen.), 43'; Szymański (yellow card) 60', (goal) 90+7'; Albanis 90'	Stadium: Alcazar Stadium; Attendance: Behind closed doors Referee: Efstathios Gortsilas (Macedonia); Man of the Match: Georgios Athanasiadis
Note: The game was scheduled for 14 February but was postponed to 15 February due to snowfall.

20 February 2021 23	AEK Athens	2–2	Asteras Tripolis	Marousi
19:30 EET (UTC+2)	Svarnas (yellow card) 24'; Szymański 40', 68'	Report	Fernández 16'; Suárez 18'	Stadium: Olympic Stadium; Attendance: Behind closed doors Referee: Irfan Peljto (Bosnia and Herzegovina); Man of the Match: Damian Szymański

28 February 2021 24	Panathinaikos	1–1	AEK Athens	Ampelokipoi
19:30 EET (UTC+2)	Alexandropoulos (yellow card) 38'; Ngbakoto (yellow card) 54'; Vélez 58'; Maurício (yellow card) 86'; Mollo (yellow card) 90+2'	Report	Krstičić (yellow card) 65'; García 73'; Lopes (yellow card) 89'	Stadium: Leoforos Alexandras Stadium; Attendance: Behind closed doors Referee: Georgi Kabakov (Bulgaria); Man of the Match: Fran Vélez

8 March 2021 25	AEK Athens	2–0	Apollon Smyrnis	Marousi
19:30 EET (UTC+2)	Ansarifard 7', 25'; Danchenko (yellow card) 53'; García (yellow card) 84'	Report	Lagos (yellow card) 44'; Ioannidis (yellow card) 90+2'	Stadium: Olympic Stadium; Attendance: Behind closed doors Referee: Athanasios Tzilos (Larissa); Man of the Match: Karim Ansarifard

14 March 2021 26	Volos	1–0	AEK Athens	Volos
19:00 EET (UTC+2)	Barrientos (yellow card) 28', (red card) 86'; Perea (yellow card) 36'; Douvikas 45+3' (pen.); Bartolo (yellow card) 85'; Klaiman (yellow card) 90+1'	Report	Nedelcearu (yellow card) 45+1'; Danchenko (yellow card) 72'	Stadium: Panthessaliko Stadium; Attendance: Behind closed doors Referee: Evangelos Manouhos (Argolida); Man of the Match: Anastasios Douvikas

==== Play-off round ====
===== Table =====
Pos	Team	Pld	W	D	L	GF	GA	GD	Pts	Qualification
1	Olympiacos (C)	36	28	6	2	82	19	+63	90	Qualification for the Champions League second qualifying round
2	PAOK	36	18	10	8	60	34	+26	64	Qualification for the Europa Conference League third qualifying round (Note: PAOK qualified for the Europa Conference League third qualifying round by winning the Greek Cup.)
3	Aris	36	17	10	9	41	26	+15	61	Qualification for the Europa Conference League second qualifying round
4	AEK Athens	36	17	9	10	53	45	+8	60	Qualification for the Europa Conference League second qualifying round
5	Panathinaikos	36	14	11	11	41	34	+7	53	
6	Asteras Tripolis	36	12	15	9	36	38	−2	51	

Source: Super League Greece
Rules for classification: 1) Points; 2) Head-to-head points (Regular season and play-off); 3) Head-to-head goal difference (Regular season and play-off); 4) Regular season position.
(C) Champions

===== Results summary =====
Overall								Home						Away					
Pld	W	D	L	GF	GA	GD	Pts	W	D	L	GF	GA	GD	W	D	L	GF	GA	GD
10	3	3	4	12	16	−4	12	1	2	2	6	9	−3	2	1	2	6	7	−1

Last updated: 2021-05-16.
Source: Super League Greece

===== Results by Matchday =====
Round	1	2	3	4	5	6	7	8	9	10
Ground	A	H	A	H	H	A	H	A	A	H
Result	L	L	W	W	D	L	L	W	D	D
Position	4	5	4	4	4	4	4	4	4	4

Updated to match(es) played on 16 May 2021. Source: slgr.gr
A = Away; H = Home; W = Win; D = Draw; L = Loss; P = Postponed

===== Matches =====
21 March 2021 1	PAOK	3–1	AEK Athens	Thessaloniki
19:30 EET (UTC+2)	A. Živković 3', 89'; Rodrigo (yellow card) 17'; Schwab (yellow card) 22'; Świderski 46'; El Kaddouri (yellow card) 87'; Paschalakis (yellow card) 90+4'	Report	Szymański (yellow card) 45'; Oliveira 45+4'; Shakhov (yellow card) 79'	Stadium: Toumba Stadium; Attendance: Behind closed doors Referee: Nikola Dabanović (Montenegro); Man of the Match: Andrija Živković

4 April 2021 2	AEK Athens	1–5	Olympiacos	Marousi
19:30 EEST (UTC+3)	Oliveira (yellow card) 45+3'; Ansarifard 89'	Report	Camara 17'; Masouras 23', 44'; El-Arabi 35'; Bruma (yellow card) 36'; Fortounis 74'	Stadium: Olympic Stadium; Attendance: Behind closed doors Referee: Srđan Jovanović (Serbia); Man of the Match: Georgios Masouras

11 April 2021 3	Aris	1–3	AEK Athens	Thessaloniki
15:00 EEST (UTC+3)	Rose (yellow card) 36'; Bertoglio (yellow card) 54'; Mancini 56'; M. García (yellow card) 74'	Report	Tanković 12' (pen.); Galanopoulos (yellow card) 23'; Svarnas (yellow card) 28'; Vasilantonopoulos 29'; Ansarifard 37' (pen.); Lopes (yellow card) 44'; Szymański (yellow card) 74'; Nedelcearu (yellow card) 83'; Tsintotas (yellow card) 90+4'	Stadium: Kleanthis Vikelidis Stadium; Attendance: Behind closed doors Referee: Alexey Kulbakov (Belarus); Man of the Match: Stavros Vasilantonopoulos

18 April 2021 4	AEK Athens	3–1	Asteras Tripolis	Marousi
17:15 EEST (UTC+3)	Mantalos (yellow card) 35'; Galanopoulos 39'; Lopes 85'; Albanis 90+5'	Report	Valiente (yellow card) 35'; Riera 41'	Stadium: Olympic Stadium; Attendance: Behind closed doors Referee: Angelos Evangelou (Athens); Man of the Match: Hélder Lopes

21 April 2021 5	AEK Athens	1–1	Panathinaikos	Marousi
21:30 EEST (UTC+3)	Albanis (yellow card) 17'; Chyhrynskyi (yellow card) 40'; Mantalos (yellow card) 61'; Lopes (yellow card) 63'; García 90+2'	Report	Villafáñez (yellow card) 14'; Ioannidis 36'; Sankharé (yellow card) 65'; Sánchez (yellow card) 68'; Ayoub (yellow card) 79'; Dioudis (yellow card) 90+3'	Stadium: Olympic Stadium; Attendance: Behind closed doors Referee: Dennis Higler (Netherlands); Man of the Match: Konstantinos Galanopoulos

25 April 2021 6	Olympiacos	2–0	AEK Athens	Piraeus
19:30 EEST (UTC+3)	Semedo (yellow card) 42'; Silva (yellow card) 44'; Bruma 50', 90+2'; Papastathopoulos (yellow card) 73'; Reabciuk (yellow card) 86'	Report	Nedelcearu (yellow card) 72'	Stadium: Karaiskakis Stadium; Attendance: Behind closed doors Referee: Nikola Dabanović (Montenegro); Man of the Match: Armindo Bruma

5 May 2021 7	AEK Athens	1–2	PAOK	Marousi
21:30 EEST (UTC+3)	Shakhov (yellow card) 26'; Galanopoulos (yellow card) 45'; Lopes (yellow card) 50'; Tanković (yellow card) 86', (goal) 90+2' (pen.)	Report	Živković (yellow card) 43'; Augusto (yellow card) 45'; Krmenčík 48'; Schwab 50' (pen.), (yellow card) 66'; Tsingaras (yellow card) 90+1'	Stadium: Olympic Stadium; Attendance: Behind closed doors Referee: Irfan Peljto (Bosnia and Herzegovina); Man of the Match: Michael Krmenčík

9 May 2021 8	Panathinaikos	0–1	AEK Athens	Ampelokipoi
19:30 EEST (UTC+3)	Niasse (yellow card) 25'; Vélez (yellow card) 53'; Sankharé (yellow card) 59'; Alexandropoulos (yellow card) 82'; Macheda (penalty missed) 90+5'; Ngbakoto (yellow card) 90+6'	Report	Chyhrynskyi (yellow card) 27'; Szymański (yellow card) 33'; Mantalos 50', (yellow card) 65'; Tanković (yellow card) 69'; Krstičić (yellow card) 88'; Tsintotas (yellow card) 90+5'	Stadium: Leoforos Alexandras Stadium; Attendance: Behind closed doors Referee: Yavhenii Aranovkyi (Ukraine); Man of the Match: Petros Mantalos

12 May 2021 9	Asteras Tripolis	1–1	AEK Athens	Tripoli
19:30 EEST (UTC+3)	Kotsiras 63'; Castaño (yellow card) 90+2'	Report	Ansarifard 56'; Galanopoulos (yellow card) 80'; Vasilantonopoulos (yellow card) 80'	Stadium: Theodoros Kolokotronis Stadium; Attendance: Behind closed doors Referee: Angelos Evangelou (Athens); Man of the Match: Christos Albanis

16 May 2021 10	AEK Athens	0–0	Aris	Marousi
19:30 EEST (UTC+3)	Mantalos (yellow card) 25'; Shakhov (yellow card) 38'; Chyhrynskyi (yellow card) 61'	Report	Sundgren (yellow card) 89'; Cuesta (yellow card) 90+2'	Stadium: Olympic Stadium; Attendance: Behind closed doors Referee: Andris Treimanis (Latvia); Man of the Match: Petros Mantalos

=== Greek Cup ===
AEK entered the Greek Cup at the sixth round.

==== Sixth round ====
20 January 2021 First leg	AEK Athens	2–0	Apollon Smyrnis	Marousi
21:30 EET (UTC+2)	Szymański 7'; Laci (yellow card) 54'; García 88'	Report	Kitoko (yellow card) 29'; Calisir (yellow card) 34'; Vitlis (yellow card) 60'	Stadium: Olympic Stadium; Attendance: Behind closed doors Referee: Alexandros Tsakalidis (Chalkidiki); Man of the Match: Damian Szymański

4 February 2021 Second leg	Apollon Smyrnis	2–1 (2–3 agg.)	AEK Athens	Rizoupoli
19:30 EET (UTC+2)	Dauda 15'; Lagos 27', (yellow card) 54'; Chouchoumis (yellow card) 56'; Mounier (yellow card) 82'	Report	Oliveira 20'; Simões (yellow card) 42'; García (yellow card) 76'	Stadium: Georgios Kamaras Stadium; Attendance: Behind closed doors Referee: Giorgos Tzovaras (Phthiotis); Man of the Match: Abiola Dauda

==== Quarter-finals ====
10 February 2021 First leg	AEK Athens	4–2	Volos	Marousi
17:00 EET (UTC+2)	Mantalos 25'; Tanković 29', 32'; Oliveira 36' (pen.); Danchenko (yellow card) 38'; Krstičić (yellow card) 90+1'	Report	Douvikas 14'; Mitoglou 57'; Miloc (yellow card) 73'	Stadium: Olympic Stadium; Attendance: Behind closed doors Referee: Vasilis Fotias (Pella); Man of the Match: Muamer Tanković

4 March 2021 Second leg	Volos	1–0 (3–4 agg.)	AEK Athens	Volos
18:00 EET (UTC+2)	Douvikas 35' (pen.); Perea (yellow card) 55'; Bartolo (yellow card) 66'; Ninis (yellow card) 76'; Grillo (yellow card) 89'; Klaiman (yellow card) 90+5'	Report	Tsintotas (yellow card) 34'; Svarnas (yellow card) 51'; Nedelcearu (yellow card) 63'; Hnid (yellow card) 90+1' (yellow-red card) 90+3'	Stadium: Panthessaliko Stadium; Attendance: Behind closed doors Referee: Giorgos Tzovaras (Phthiotis); Man of the Match: Anastasios Douvikas

==== Semi-finals ====
7 April 2021 First leg	AEK Athens	0–1	PAOK	Marousi
20:00 EEST (UTC+3)	Oliveira (yellow card) 19'; Mantalos (yellow card) 48'; García (yellow card) 80'; Albanis (yellow card) 87'	Report	Živković (yellow card) 20'; Vieirinha (yellow card) 45+2'; El Kaddouri (yellow card) 57'; Murg 90+5'	Stadium: Olympic Stadium; Attendance: Behind closed doors Referee: Georgi Kabakov (Bulgaria); Man of the Match: Alexandros Paschalakis

29 April 2021 Second leg	PAOK	2–1 (3–1 agg.)	AEK Athens	Thessaloniki
19:00 EEST (UTC+3)	Ingason (yellow card) 34'; Vieirinha (yellow card) 45+3', (penalty missed) 61'; Krmenčík 84', (yellow card) 86'; Živković 90+6'	Report	Ansarifard (yellow card) 36'; Galanopoulos (yellow card) 60', (goal) 69'; Svarnas (yellow card) 86'; Nedelcearu (yellow card) 90+2'	Stadium: Toumba Stadium; Attendance: Behind closed doors Referee: Daniele Doveri (Italy); Man of the Match: Baba Rahman

=== UEFA Europa League ===
==== Qualification rounds ====
The draw for the third qualifying round was held on 1 September 2020 and the draw for the play-off round was held on 18 September 2020.

24 September 2020 Third qualifying round	St. Gallen (Switzerland)	0–1	(Greece) AEK Athens	St. Gallen, Switzerland
21:30 EEST (UTC+3)	Muheim (yellow card) 32'; Görtler (yellow card) 52' (yellow-red card) 90+5'; Fazliji (yellow card) 80'	Report	Livaja (yellow card) 35'; Mantalos (yellow card) 45+1'; Krstičić (yellow card) 51'; Oliveira (penalty missed) 72', 72'	Stadium: Kybunpark; Attendance: Behind closed doors Referee: Alejandro Hernández (Spain)

1 October 2020 Play-off round	AEK Athens (Greece)	2–1	(Germany) Wolfsburg	Athens, Greece
21:45 EEST (UTC+3)	Insúa (yellow card) 16'; Mantalos (penalty missed) 20'; Simões 64', (yellow card) 89'; Ansarifard 90+4'; Livaja (yellow card) 90+5'	Report	Schlager (yellow card) 19'; Lacroix (yellow card) 22'; Mehmedi 45+1'	Stadium: Olympic Stadium; Attendance: Behind closed doors Referee: Artur Soares Dias (Portugal)

==== Group stage ====
The group stage draw was held on 2 October 2020.

Pos	Team	Pld	W	D	L	GF	GA	GD	Pts	Qualification	LEI	BRA	ZOR	AEK
1	(England) Leicester City	6	4	1	1	14	5	+9	13 (Note: Head-to-head points: Leicester City 4, Braga 1.)	Advance to knockout phase	—	4–0	3–0	2–0
2	(Portugal) Braga	6	4	1	1	14	10	+4	13	Advance to knockout phase	3–3	—	2–0	3–0
3	(Ukraine) Zorya Luhansk	6	2	0	4	6	11	−5	6		1–0	1–2	—	1–4
4	(Greece) AEK Athens	6	1	0	5	7	15	−8	3		1–2	2–4	0–3	—

Source: UEFA
Rules for classification: Group stage tiebreakers

===== Matches =====
22 October 2020 1	Braga (Portugal)	3–0	(Greece) AEK Athens	Braga, Portugal
22:00 EEST (UTC+3)	Galeno 44'; Sequeira (yellow card) 55'; Carmo (yellow card) 56'; Esgaio (yellow card) 69'; Paulinho 78'; Ricardo Horta 88'	Report	Mantalos (yellow card) 19'; Nedelcearu (yellow card) 34'; Oliveira (yellow card) 67'	Stadium: Estadio Municipal de Braga; Attendance: 2,200; Referee: Ruddy Buquet (France)

29 October 2020 2	AEK Athens (Greece)	1–2	(England) Leicester City	Athens, Greece
19:55 EET (UTC+2)	Mantalos (yellow card) 21'; Tanković 49'; Krstičić (yellow card) 59'; Insúa (yellow card) 73'	Report	Vardy 18' (pen.); Choudhury 39'; Thomas (yellow card) 73'	Stadium: Olympic Stadium; Attendance: Behind closed doors Referee: Harald Lechner (Austria)

5 November 2020 3	Zorya Luhansk (Ukraine)	1–4	(Greece) AEK Athens	Luhansk, Ukraine
22:00 EET (UTC+2)	Vernydub (yellow card) 66'; Kocherhin 81'	Report	Tanković 7'; Mantalos (yellow card) 30', (goal) 34'; Livaja 54', 81'; Ansarifard (yellow card) 77'; Insúa (yellow card) 87'	Stadium: Slavutych-Arena; Attendance: Behind closed doors Referee: Willie Collum (Scotland)

26 November 2020 4	AEK Athens (Greece)	0–3	(Ukraine) Zorya Luhansk	Athens, Greece
19:55 EET (UTC+2)	Shakhov (yellow card) 43' (yellow-red card) 48'; Tanković (yellow card) 49'; Simões (yellow card) 55'; Svarnas (yellow card) 70'	Report	Vernydub (yellow card) 49'; Hromov 61'; Kocherhin (yellow card) 73'; Kabayev 76'; Yurchenko 86' (pen.)	Stadium: Olympic Stadium; Attendance: Behind closed doors Referee: Aliyar Aghayev (Azerbaijan)

3 December 2020 5	AEK Athens (Greece)	2–4	(Portugal) Braga	Athens, Greece
19:55 EET (UTC+2)	Oliveira 31'; Vasilantonopoulos (yellow card) 58', (goal) 89'; Insúa (yellow card) 70'; Mantalos (yellow card) 74'	Report	Tormena 8'; Esgaio 10', (yellow card) 74'; Viana (yellow card) 30'; Ricardo Horta 45'; Al-Musrati (yellow card) 50'; Castro (yellow card) 74'; Galeno 83'	Stadium: Olympic Stadium; Attendance: Behind closed doors Referee: Georgi Kabakov (Bulgaria)

10 December 2020 6	Leicester City (England)	2–0	(Greece) AEK Athens	Leicester, England
22:00 EET (UTC+2)	Ünder 12'; Barnes 14'	Report	Hnid (yellow card) 24'	Stadium: King Power Stadium; Attendance: Behind closed doors Referee: Lawrence Visser (Belgium)

== Statistics ==
=== Squad statistics ===
As of 16 May 2021

No.	Pos	Player	Super League		Super League Play-offs		Greek Cup		Europa League		Total	
No.	Pos	Player	Apps	Goals	Apps	Goals	Apps	Goals	Apps	Goals	Apps	Goals
Goalkeepers
1	GK	(Greece) Panagiotis Tsintotas	13	0	4	0	5	0	5	0	27	0
16	GK	(Greece) Vasilios Chatziemmanouil	0	0	0	0	0	0	0	0	0	0
30	GK	(Greece) Georgios Athanasiadis	13	0	6	0	1	0	1	0	21	0
99	GK	(Greece) Georgios Theocharis	0	0	0	0	0	0	0	0	0	0
Defenders
2	DF	(Greece) Michalis Bakakis	11	0	4	0	0	0	3	0	18	0
3	DF	(Portugal) Hélder Lopes	20	0	9	1	6	0	2	0	37	1
5	DF	(Romania) Ionuț Nedelcearu	18	1	7	0	4	0	6	0	35	1
15	DF	(Slovenia) Žiga Laci	10	0	1	0	2	0	0	0	13	0
19	DF	(Ukraine) Dmytro Chyhrynskyi	10	0	6	0	3	0	5	0	24	0
24	DF	(Greece) Stratos Svarnas	20	0	10	0	4	0	7	0	41	0
26	DF	(Tunisia) Nassim Hnid	9	0	1	0	2	0	2	0	14	0
33	DF	(Ukraine) Oleh Danchenko	4	0	3	0	4	0	0	0	11	0
37	DF	(Bosnia and Herzegovina) Vedad Radonja	1	0	0	0	3	0	0	0	4	0
40	DF	(Albania) Mario Mitaj	6	0	4	0	2	0	1	0	13	0
88	DF	(Greece) Stavros Vasilantonopoulos	5	0	8	1	2	0	8	1	23	2
Midfielders
4	MF	(Poland) Damian Szymański	11	3	10	0	6	1	0	0	27	4
6	MF	(Serbia) Nenad Krstičić	16	1	9	0	4	0	7	0	36	1
8	MF	(Portugal) André Simões	18	2	0	0	3	0	5	1	26	3
20	MF	(Greece) Petros Mantalos	24	1	9	1	5	1	7	1	45	4
25	MF	(Greece) Konstantinos Galanopoulos	10	3	9	1	4	1	4	0	27	5
28	MF	(Ukraine) Yevhen Shakhov	19	3	6	0	3	0	7	0	35	3
51	MF	(Greece) Giannis Sardelis	0	0	1	0	0	0	0	0	1	0
Forwards
9	FW	(Trinidad and Tobago) Levi García	19	4	7	1	5	1	4	0	35	6
11	FW	(Iran) Karim Ansarifard	24	10	10	3	5	0	8	1	47	14
14	FW	(Greece) Christos Albanis	14	1	8	1	5	0	2	0	29	2
17	FW	(Sweden) Muamer Tanković	20	2	7	2	5	2	5	2	37	8
18	FW	(Portugal) Nélson Oliveira	21	5	5	1	4	2	6	2	36	10
35	FW	(Greece) Michalis Kosidis	0	0	6	0	1	0	0	0	7	0
52	FW	(Greece) Efthymis Christopoulos	3	0	0	0	1	0	0	0	4	0
53	FW	(Greece) Theodosis Macheras	13	1	3	0	4	0	5	0	25	1
Left during Summer Transfer Window
12	FW	(Nigeria) Bright Enobakhare	1	1	0	0	0	0	0	0	1	1
Left during Winter Transfer Window
22	DF	(Argentina) Emanuel Insúa	13	0	0	0	0	0	6	0	19	0
27	DF	(Portugal) Paulinho	10	0	0	0	0	0	0	0	10	0
29	MF	(Portugal) David Simão	0	0	0	0	0	0	0	0	0	0
44	MF	(Bosnia and Herzegovina) Anel Šabanadžović	2	0	0	0	0	0	2	0	4	0
70	MF	(Greece) Giannis Fivos Botos	1	0	0	0	0	0	1	0	2	0
10	FW	(Croatia) Marko Livaja	17	3	0	0	1	0	5	2	23	5
69	FW	(Serbia) Petar Karaklajić	0	0	0	0	0	0	0	0	0	0

=== Goalscorers ===
As of 16 May 2021
The list is sorted by competition order when total goals are equal, then by position and then by squad number.

Rank	No.	Pos.	Player	Super League	Super League Play-offs	Greek Cup	Europa League	Total
1	11	FW	(Iran) Karim Ansarifard	10	3	0	1	14
2	18	FW	(Portugal) Nélson Oliveira	5	1	2	2	10
3	17	FW	(Sweden) Muamer Tanković	2	2	2	2	8
4	9	FW	(Trinidad and Tobago) Levi García	4	1	1	0	6
5	25	MF	(Greece) Konstantinos Galanopoulos	3	1	1	0	5
5	10	FW	(Croatia) Marko Livaja	3	0	0	2	5
7	4	MF	(Poland) Damian Szymański	3	0	1	0	4
7	20	MF	(Greece) Petros Mantalos	1	1	1	1	4
9	28	MF	(Ukraine) Yevhen Shakhov	3	0	0	0	3
9	8	MF	(Portugal) André Simões	2	0	0	1	3
11	14	FW	(Greece) Christos Albanis	1	1	0	0	2
11	88	DF	(Greece) Stavros Vasilantonopoulos	0	1	0	1	2
13	5	DF	(Romania) Ionuț Nedelcearu	1	0	0	0	1
13	6	MF	(Serbia) Nenad Krstičić	1	0	0	0	1
13	53	FW	(Greece) Theodosis Macheras	1	0	0	0	1
13	99	FW	(Nigeria) Bright Enobakhare	1	0	0	0	1
13	3	DF	(Portugal) Hélder Lopes	0	1	0	0	1
Own goals				0	0	0	0	0
Totals				41	12	8	10	71

=== Assists ===
As of 16 May 2021
The list is sorted by competition order when total assists are equal, then by position and then by squad number.

Rank	No.	Pos.	Player	Super League	Super League Play-offs	Greek Cup	Europa League	Total
1	20	MF	(Greece) Petros Mantalos	6	3	2	2	13
2	9	FW	(Trinidad and Tobago) Levi García	6	0	1	0	7
2	17	FW	(Sweden) Muamer Tanković	5	0	1	1	7
4	40	DF	(Albania) Mario Mitaj	2	0	0	0	2
4	14	FW	(Greece) Christos Albanis	1	1	0	0	2
4	53	FW	(Greece) Theodosis Macheras	1	1	0	0	2
4	10	FW	(Croatia) Marko Livaja	0	0	0	2	2
8	15	DF	(Slovenia) Žiga Laci	1	0	0	0	1
8	2	DF	(Greece) Michalis Bakakis	1	0	0	0	1
8	27	DF	(Portugal) Paulinho	1	0	0	0	1
8	8	MF	(Portugal) André Simões	1	0	0	0	1
8	28	MF	(Ukraine) Yevhen Shakhov	1	0	0	0	1
8	18	FW	(Portugal) Nélson Oliveira	1	0	0	0	1
8	4	MF	(Poland) Damian Szymański	0	1	0	0	1
8	11	FW	(Iran) Karim Ansarifard	0	1	0	0	1
8	35	FW	(Greece) Michalis Kosidis	0	1	0	0	1
8	3	DF	(Portugal) Hélder Lopes	0	0	1	0	1
8	6	MF	(Serbia) Nenad Krstičić	0	0	1	0	1
8	88	DF	(Greece) Stavros Vasilantonopoulos	0	0	0	1	1
8	22	DF	(Argentina) Emanuel Insúa	0	0	0	1	1
Totals				27	8	6	7	48

=== Clean sheets ===
As of 16 May 2021
The list is sorted by competition order when total clean sheets are equal and then by squad number. Clean sheets in games where both goalkeepers participated are awarded to the goalkeeper who started the game. Goalkeepers with no appearances are not included.

Rank	No.	Player	Super League	Super League Play-offs	Greek Cup	Europa League	Total
1	1	(Greece) Panagiotis Tsintotas	3	2	1	1	7
2	30	(Greece) Georgios Athanasiadis	5	0	0	0	5
Totals			8	2	1	1	12

=== Disciplinary record ===
As of 16 May 2021

N	P	Nat.	Name	Super League			Super League Play-offs			Greek Cup			Europa League			Total			Notes
N	P	Nat.	Name	Yellow card	Second yellow card	Red card	Yellow card	Second yellow card	Red card	Yellow card	Second yellow card	Red card	Yellow card	Second yellow card	Red card	Yellow card	Second yellow card	Red card	Notes
Goalkeepers
1	GK	(Greece)	Panagiotis Tsintotas	1			2			1						4			
16	GK	(Greece)	Vasilios Chatziemmanouil																
30	GK	(Greece)	Georgios Athanasiadis																
99	GK	(Greece)	Georgios Theocharis																
Defenders
2	DF	(Greece)	Michalis Bakakis	1												1			
3	DF	(Portugal)	Hélder Lopes	4			3									7			
5	DF	(Romania)	Ionuț Nedelcearu	4			2			2			1			9			
15	DF	(Slovenia)	Žiga Laci	1						1						2			
19	DF	(Ukraine)	Dmytro Chyhrynskyi	3			3									6			
24	DF	(Greece)	Stratos Svarnas	3			1			2			1			7			
26	DF	(Tunisia)	Nassim Hnid	1						2	1		1			4	1		
33	DF	(Ukraine)	Oleh Danchenko	2						1						3			
37	DF	(Bosnia and Herzegovina)	Vedad Radonja																
40	DF	(Albania)	Mario Mitaj																
88	DF	(Greece)	Stavros Vasilantonopoulos				2						1			3			
Midfielders
4	MF	(Poland)	Damian Szymański	2			3									5			
6	MF	(Serbia)	Nenad Krstičić	11			1			2			2			16			
8	MF	(Portugal)	André Simões	3						1			2			6			
20	MF	(Greece)	Petros Mantalos	1		1	3			1			5			10		1	
25	MF	(Greece)	Konstantinos Galanopoulos	1			3			1						5			
28	MF	(Ukraine)	Yevhen Shakhov	2		1	3						2	1		7	1	1	
51	MF	(Greece)	Giannis Sardelis																
Forwards
9	FW	(Trinidad and Tobago)	Levi García	3						2						5			
11	FW	(Iran)	Karim Ansarifard	2						1			1			4			
14	FW	(Greece)	Christos Albanis				1			1						2			
17	FW	(Sweden)	Muamer Tanković	2			2						1			5			
18	FW	(Portugal)	Nélson Oliveira	3			1			1			1			6			
35	FW	(Greece)	Michalis Kosidis																
52	FW	(Greece)	Efthymis Christopoulos																
53	FW	(Greece)	Theodosis Macheras																
Left during Summer Transfer window
12	FW	(Nigeria)	Bright Enobakhare																
Left during Winter Transfer window
22	DF	(Argentina)	Emanuel Insúa	6		1							4			10		1	
27	DF	(Portugal)	Paulinho	3	1											3	1		
29	MF	(Portugal)	David Simão																
44	MF	(Bosnia and Herzegovina)	Anel Šabanadžović																
70	MF	(Greece)	Giannis Fivos Botos																
10	FW	(Croatia)	Marko Livaja	6									2			8			
69	FW	(Serbia)	Petar Karaklajić																

=== Starting 11 ===
This section presents the most frequently used formation along with the players with the most starts across all competitions.

N.	Formation	Matchday(s)
26	4–2–1–3	1, 3, 4, 6, 7, 9–17, 24–26
10	4–3–3	8, 18–21
8	3–5–2	2
3	4–4–2	22, 23
3	3–4–3	5

No.	Nat.	Player	Pos.
1	(Greece)	Panagiotis Tsintotas	GK
5	(Romania)	Ionuț Nedelcearu	RCB
19	(Ukraine)	Dmytro Chyhrynskyi	LCB
24	(Greece)	Stratos Svarnas	RB
3	(Portugal)	Hélder Lopes	LB
28	(Ukraine)	Yevhen Shakhov	CM
6	(Serbia)	Nenad Krstičić	CM
20	(Greece)	Petros Mantalos (C)	AM
9	(Trinidad and Tobago)	Levi García	RW
17	(Sweden)	Muamer Tanković	LW
11	(Iran)	Karim Ansarifard	CF

Last updated: 2021-05-16

== Awards ==
Player	Pos.	Award	Source
(Serbia) Nenad Krstičić	MF	NIVEA MEN Best Goal (3rd Matchday)	
(Ukraine) Yevhen Shakhov	MF	NIVEA MEN Best Goal (7th Matchday)	
(Trinidad and Tobago) Levi García	FW	NIVEA MEN Best Goal (8th Matchday)	
(Portugal) André Simões	MF	NIVEA MEN Best Goal (9th Matchday)	
(Iran) Karim Ansarifard	FW	NIVEA MEN Best Goal (10th Matchday)	
(Trinidad and Tobago) Levi García	FW	NIVEA MEN Best Goal (12th Matchday)	
(Sweden) Muamer Tanković	FW	NIVEA MEN Best Goal (13th Matchday)	
(Poland) Damian Szymański	MF	NIVEA MEN Best Goal (22nd Matchday)	
(Poland) Damian Szymański	MF	NIVEA MEN Best Goal (23rd Matchday)	
(Poland) Damian Szymański	MF	NIVEA MEN Player of the Month (February)	
(Greece) Stavros Vasilantonopoulos	DF	NIVEA MEN Best Goal Playoffs/Playouts (3rd Matchday)	
(Greece) Konstantinos Galanopoulos	MF	NIVEA MEN Best Goal Playoffs/Playouts (4th Matchday)	
(Greece) Petros Mantalos	MF	NIVEA MEN Player of the Month (May)	
(Trinidad and Tobago) Levi García	FW	NIVEA MEN Player of the Club	
(Trinidad and Tobago) Levi García	FW	Team of the Season	
