= Žiga Laci =

Slovenian footballer (born 2002)

Personal information
- Date of birth: 20 July 2002 (age 24)
- Place of birth: Murska Sobota, Slovenia
- Height: 1.89 m (6 ft 2 in)
- Position: Centre-back

Team information
- Current team: Gančani

Youth career
- 2008–2012: Nafta Lendava
- 2012–2014: Dobrovnik
- 2014–2016: Turnišče
- 2016–2020: Mura

Senior career*
| Years | Team | Apps | (Gls) |
| 2018–2020 | Mura | 4 | (1) |
| 2020–2024 | AEK Athens | 12 | (0) |
| 2021–2024 | AEK Athens B | 35 | (0) |
| 2022 | → Koper (loan) | 1 | (0) |
| 2024–2025 | Mura | 3 | (0) |
| 2025 | Gančani | 11 | (4) |
| 2026 | UFC Jennersdorf | 15 | (1) |
| 2026– | Gančani | | |

International career
| 2019 | Slovenia U17 | 4 | (0) |
| 2019 | Slovenia U18 | 3 | (0) |
| 2019–2020 | Slovenia U19 | 10 | (0) |
| 2021 | Slovenia U21 | 3 | (0) |
- * Club domestic league appearances and goals as of 31 July 2026

Žiga Laci (born 20 July 2002) is a Slovenian footballer who plays as a centre-back for Gančani.

== Club career ==
=== Mura ===
In July 2018, Laci signed his first professional contract with Mura until 2021. He made his senior debut on 11 May 2019 in the 32nd round of the 2018–19 Slovenian PrvaLiga, coming on as a late substitute in a match against Krško, which Mura won 3–0.

=== AEK Athens ===
On 14 February 2020, Laci signed a three-year contract with Greek club AEK Athens. On 8 July 2021, his contract had been extended until the summer of 2026.

== International career ==
Laci made his international debut on 21 February 2019, when he played for the Slovenia under-17 team in a 2–1 victory over Bosnia and Herzegovina. In March 2019, he played in the elite round of the 2019 UEFA European Under-17 Championship qualifiers, where Slovenia was eliminated after two defeats and a draw.

On 26 July 2019, Laci debuted for the Slovenia under-19 side in a 3–1 win against the United Arab Emirates.

== Career statistics ==
=== Club ===
As of match played 27 April 2022

Appearances and goals by club, season and competition
| Club | Season | League | | | National cup | | Continental | | Total | |
| Club | Season | Division | Apps | Goals | Apps | Goals | Apps | Goals | Apps | Goals |
|---|---|---|---|---|---|---|---|---|---|---|
| Mura | 2018–19 | Slovenian PrvaLiga | 2 | 0 | — | | — | | 2 | 0 |
| Mura | 2019–20 | Slovenian PrvaLiga | 2 | 1 | 0 | 0 | 1 (Note: Appearance in UEFA Europa League) | 0 | 3 | 1 |
| Mura | Total | | 4 | 1 | 0 | 0 | 1 | 0 | 5 | 1 |
| AEK Athens | 2019–20 | Super League Greece | 1 | 0 | 0 | 0 | — | | 1 | 0 |
| AEK Athens | 2020–21 | Super League Greece | 11 | 0 | 2 | 0 | 0 | 0 | 13 | 0 |
| AEK Athens | 2021–22 | Super League Greece | 0 | 0 | 1 | 0 | 0 | 0 | 1 | 0 |
| AEK Athens | Total | | 12 | 0 | 3 | 0 | 0 | 0 | 15 | 0 |
| AEK Athens B | 2021–22 | Super League Greece 2 | 20 | 0 | — | | — | | 20 | 0 |
| Career total | | | 36 | 1 | 3 | 0 | 1 | 0 | 40 | 1 |
