= Julián Bartolo =

Argentine footballer

Personal information
- Date of birth: 15 April 1996 (age 30)
- Place of birth: Quilmes, Argentina
- Height: 1.66 m (5 ft 5 in)
- Position: Winger

Team information
- Current team: Asteras Tripolis
- Number: 7

Youth career
- Lanús

Senior career*
Years	Team	Apps	(Gls)
2017–2018	San Miguel	19	(1)
2018–2019	Guillermo Brown	15	(0)
2019–2020	Acassuso	5	(1)
2020–2022	Volos	59	(7)
2022–	Asteras Tripolis	116	(23)
- * Club domestic league appearances and goals as of 20 October 2026

Julián Bartolo (born 15 April 1996) is an Argentine professional footballer who plays as a winger for Greek Super League club Asteras Tripolis.

== Career ==
Bartolo played in the youth set-up of Lanús, a team he represented at the 2016 U-20 Copa Libertadores in Paraguay. On 6 September 2017, Bartolo departed the Primera División club to move to Primera B Metropolitana's San Miguel. Villa San Carlos were the opponents for his professional bow, with the midfielder featuring for the final twenty minutes of a 2–0 victory on 26 September. He was selected in a total of nineteen matches during 2017–18, a campaign in which he scored his first senior goal against Fénix in December. July 2018 saw Bartolo join Guillermo Brown of Primera B Nacional.

On 7 August 2020, after a season back in the third tier with Acassuso, Bartolo joined Superleague Greece outfit Volos on a free transfer. He scored his first goal in stoppage time of a 1–1 draw away to Panathinaikos on 24 October. On 30 November, Bartolo scored in a 3–3 away draw against Apollon Smyrnis; his side were three goals down early in the second half, with the midfielder netting the second and assisting the equaliser for fellow Argentine player Rodrigo Colombo, having been substituted on at 3–1 in place of other compatriot Nicolás Martínez.

In the first two games of the 2021–22 season, Bartolo scored helping to wins against Lamia and Apollon Smyrnis and a perfect start, which found his team on top of the league table. On 17 October 2021, Bartolo scored a goal and assisted Tom van Weert in a spectacular 4–4 away draw against PAOK, despite his team being down by three goals in the first half.

=== Asteras Tripolis ===
On 1 July 2022, Bartolo signed a three-year contract with Asteras Tripolis, also in the top tier. His debut season for the club was difficult, scoring only two goals in 23 games.

He started the 2023–24 season scoring in two consecutive games, a 3–0 home win against OFI and a 3–2 away win against Aris, and assisting another one in his team's first away win over Volos.

== Career statistics ==
As of 22 May 2026.

Club statistics
Club	Season	League			Cup		League Cup		Continental		Other		Total	
Club	Season	Division	Apps	Goals	Apps	Goals	Apps	Goals	Apps	Goals	Apps	Goals	Apps	Goals
San Miguel	2017–18	Primera B Metropolitana	19	1	0	0	—		—		0	0	19	1
Guillermo Brown	2018–19	Primera B Nacional	15	0	0	0	—		—		0	0	15	0
Acassuso	2019–20	Primera B Metropolitana	23	7	0	0	—		—		0	0	23	7
Volos	2020–21	Super League Greece	29	3	4	0	—		—		—		33	3
Volos	2021–22	Super League Greece	30	4	3	1	—		—		—		33	5
Volos	Total		59	7	7	1	—		—		—		66	8
Asteras Tripolis	2022–23	Super League Greece	22	2	1	0	—		—		—		23	2
Asteras Tripolis	2023–24	Super League Greece	27	3	2	0	—		—		—		29	3
Asteras Tripolis	2024–25	Super League Greece	28	4	6	3	—		—		—		34	7
Asteras Tripolis	2025–26	Super League Greece	33	12	4	0	—		—		—		37	12
Asteras Tripolis	Total		110	21	13	3	—		—		—		123	24
Career total			226	36	20	4	0	0	0	0	0	0	246	40
