= Stavros Vasilantonopoulos =

Greek footballer

Personal information
- Date of birth: 28 January 1992 (age 34)
- Place of birth: Aigio, Greece
- Height: 1.80 m (5 ft 11 in)
- Positions: Right-back; right midfielder

Team information
- Current team: Panegialios

Youth career
- 2002–2007: Anaggenisi/Aias Sympoliteias
- 2007–2009: Thyella Aigio
- 2009–2012: Panegialios

Senior career*
Years	Team	Apps	(Gls)
2012–2014	Panachaiki	50	(2)
2014–2015	Apollon Smyrnis	17	(0)
2015–2021	AEK Athens	17	(1)
2016–2017	→ Veria (loan)	28	(0)
2017–2019	→ Lamia (loan)	54	(2)
2020	→ Górnik Zabrze (loan)	11	(2)
2021–2022	Atromitos	22	(1)
2023–2024	Lamia	24	(0)
2024–2025	Kalamata	20	(1)
2025–	Panegialios		
- * Club domestic league appearances and goals as of 1 July 2025

Stavros Vasilantonopoulos (Greek: Σταύρος Βασιλαντωνόπουλος; born 28 January 1992) is a Greek professional footballer who plays as a right-back for Gamma Ethniki club Panegialios.

== Career ==
Vasilantonopoulos started his career playing for Panachaiki, before he joined Apollon Smyrnis playing in Football League for the 2014–15 season. On 30 June 2016, he joined Veria on a season-long loan. He made 28 appearances, but the club couldn't avoid relegation. On 26 June 2017, he was loaned again to newly promoted Super League club Lamia. On 29 October 2017, he scored his first two goals in a 2–0 home win against Platanias. The 25-year old has made some solid performances in the first half of the 2017–18 season and AEK is keeping tabs on him.

On 31 May 2018, Vasilantonopoulos agreed to a contract extension with AEK, until the summer of 2020.

On 4 July 2018, his loan to Lamia was extended by an additional year.

On 3 March 2020, he was loaned out to Ekstraklasa club Górnik Zabrze for the remainder of the current football season. On 6 March 2020, in his debut he scored the winning goal with a wonderful kick after Jesús Jiménez's assist in a 3–2 home win game against Cracovia.

On 23 June 2021, he signed a two-year contract with Atromitos.

== Career statistics ==
As of 14 December 2021

Club	Season	League			Cup		Continental		Other		Total	
Club	Season	Division	Apps	Goals	Apps	Goals	Apps	Goals	Apps	Goals	Apps	Goals
Panachaiki	2012–13	Super League Greece 2	33	2	3	0	—		—		36	2
Panachaiki	2013–14	Super League Greece 2	17	0	0	0	—		—		17	0
Panachaiki	Total		50	2	3	0	—		—		53	2
Apollon Smyrnis	2014–15	Super League Greece 2	17	0	6	0	—		—		23	0
AEK Athens	2015–16	Super League Greece	2	0	1	0	—		—		3	0
AEK Athens	2019–20	Super League Greece	2	0	1	0	—		—		3	0
AEK Athens	2020–21	Super League Greece	13	1	2	0	8	1	—		23	2
AEK Athens	Total		17	1	4	0	8	1	—		29	2
Veria (loan)	2016–17	Super League Greece	28	0	3	0	—		—		31	0
Lamia (loan)	2017–18	Super League Greece	29	2	5	0	—		—		34	2
Lamia (loan)	2018–19	Super League Greece	25	0	8	1	—		—		33	1
Lamia (loan)	Total		54	2	13	1	—		—		67	3
Górnik Zabrze (loan)	2019–20	Ekstraklasa	11	2	—		—		—		11	2
Atromitos	2021–22	Super League Greece	13	1	1	0	—		—		14	1
Career total			191	8	29	1	8	1	0	0	228	10

== Honours ==
AEK Athens

- Greek Cup: 2015–16
