= Petar Karaklajić =

Serbian footballer

Personal information
- Date of birth: 1 February 2000 (age 26)
- Place of birth: Belgrade, FR Yugoslavia
- Height: 1.80 m (5 ft 11 in)
- Position: Attacking midfielder

Youth career
- –2014: Red Star Belgrade
- 2014–2019: Voždovac
- 2019–2020: Brodarac

Senior career*
Years	Team	Apps	(Gls)
2020	Proleter Novi Sad	9	(0)
2020–2022	AEK Athens	0	(0)
2021	→ Rad (loan)	15	(1)
2021–2022	AEK Athens B		
2022–2023	Panachaiki	12	(0)
2023–2024	Zvijezda 09	30	(5)
2024–2025	Borac Banja Luka	1	(0)
2025	Zvijezda 09	9	(3)
2026	AFC Câmpulung Muscel	6	(1)
- * Club domestic league appearances and goals as of 4 April 2026

Petar Karaklajić (Serbian Cyrillic: Петар Караклајић; born 1 February 2000) is a Serbian professional footballer who plays as an attacking midfielder.

== Career ==
=== AEK Athens ===
On 7 August 2020, AEK have unveiled the signing of Petar Karaklajić, with the Serbian prospect penning a five-year deal for an undisclosed fee. Karaklajić mainly plays on the left wing. The 20-year-old attacker impressed with Proleter Novi Sad in the 2019–20 Serbian SuperLiga campaign, tallying three assists in nine matches and AEK's technical director Ilija Ivić has signed Karaklajić with a view to the future.
