= Asteras Tripolis F.C. =

Association football club in Greece

Asteras AKTOR
- Full name: Athletic Gymnastic Football Club Asteras Tripolis
- Nicknames: Kitrinoble (The Yellow-Blues); Arkádes (Arcadians); Tigers Ultras (supporters)
- Founded: 26 March 1931; 95 years ago
- Ground: Theodoros Kolokotronis Stadium, Tripoli, Greece
- Capacity: 7,423
- Owner(s): Dimitrios Bakos; Giannis Kaimenakis
- President: Georgios Borovilos
- Head coach: Gonçalo Feio
- League: Super League Greece
- 2025–26: Super League Greece, 11th of 14
- Website: asterastripolis.gr
Home colours	Away colours	Third colours

Asteras Tripolis Football Club (Greek: ΠΑΕ Αστέρας Τρίπολης), currently known as Asteras AKTOR for sponsorship reasons, commonly referred to as Asteras, is a Greek professional football club based in the city of Tripoli in Arcadia, Peloponnese, Greece.

Asteras Tripolis has been competing in Super League Greece, the Greek top professional league, since the 2007–08 season. They were runners-up of the Greek Football Cup in 2013 and have reached the semi-finals of the competition overall four times.

Asteras Tripolis has competed in the UEFA Europa League group stage for two seasons and has a total of five seasons in the competition. The club ranks 10th among the 19 Greek clubs with contribution of points for the UEFA country ranking.

== History ==
=== Early years ===
Asteras Tripolis was founded on 26 March 1931, in the area near Tripoli's railway station and was formally recognised forthwith. However, the club stayed inactive and during 1932 all football clubs in Tripoli were temporarily dissolved. At the same time, Minas Tsavdaris founded a football club and named it "Keramikos" after his home area. Despite his efforts, Keramikos was never formally recognised, and in 1938 Tsavdaris decided to transfer all of the club's players to Asteras Tripolis, which was still legally recognised. This signified the revival of the club and Asteras Tripolis managed to compete in the inaugural season (1939–40) of the regional Arcadian League. However, the subsequent German occupation of Greece ended all league competitions abruptly and the club was dissolved once again.

=== Post-World War II ===
Asteras Tripolis team in Second National Division of 1962–63 season

After World War II, Asteras Tripolis was reformed under the name "Neos Asteras" and was accordingly recognised by Tripoli's courts on 23 June 1947. Asteras Tripolis won five consecutive titles in the Arcadian League (1957–62). The team won consecutive promotions and managed to play for two seasons in Second National Division (1961–63), thus becoming the first team from Tripoli to ever participate in such a high division. In the summer of 1963, Asteras Tripolis merged with Aris–Atromitos and the new team was named "Athlitikos Omilos Tripolis" (Athletic Club of Tripoli, AOT). AOT's function was based in Asteras Tripolis' statute and the new club continued its activities until 1968, when it was dissolved once again and was subsequently merged with Arkadikos to form Panarkadikos.

=== Recent history and era of success (2003–present) ===
Asteras Tripolis was reformed again in 1978. The club participated in the regional Arcadian League until 2003. At 2001 the club entered a new era and led an outstanding streak of performances under the leadership of Dimitris Bakos and Giannis Kaimenakis. They remained unbeaten at home for over 5 years (from 2001 to November 2006) and they managed to move up four divisions, earning the promotion for the Super League Greece as Second Division champions on 12 May 2007.

Asteras Tripolis made a spectacular start in their first season in Super League, under the technical leadership of Paulo Campos. Their first ever win was against Panathinaikos (1–0 in Tripoli) and their first away win against OFI in Crete (3–0). The season was marked by some outstanding performances with the most memorable being the 1–0 home victory against champions Olympiacos. They also managed to win 2–1 against AEK Athens and 2–0 against PAOK at home. Asteras Tripolis became the first and only newly promoted Super League team that managed to beat Olympiacos, Panathinaikos, PAOK (home and away) and AEK Athens in its first ever appearance in the top division. It is remarkable that the team of that season made Asteras Tripolis popular in Greek fans as "Boca" because of its Argentinian players (Lucio Filomeno, Horacio Cardozo, Mauro Milano, Israel Damonte, Carlos Massara) and the mutual colours of the club with the famous Boca Juniors.

Coach Paulo Campos left Asteras Tripolis on 24 February 2008 with assistant manager Panagiotis Tzanavaras taking over for the rest of the 2007–08 season. Asteras Tripolis finally ended 7th, missing the European spot in the last games. In the summer of 2008, Asteras Tripolis announced Carlos Carvalhal as their new manager. He was sacked in mid-season due to poor results which led the team near the relegation zone. He was succeeded by former AEK Athens caretaker manager, Nikos Kostenoglou. Despite the unfortunate results in Super League, the team managed to remain focused on the goal of the Greek Cup, reaching the semi-finals for the first time in its history, where finally eliminated by Olympiacos. In 2009, Asteras Tripolis signed the Argentinean former Inter Milan assistant Mario Gómez as their new coach.

After a season with moderate results that led Asteras Tripolis to 12th-place finish in Super League, the next season was coming to get worse the status of the club. In the 2010–11 season, after some wrong player choices and a disappointing 2nd round, Asteras Tripolis dealt relegation hammer blow. However, on 19 May 2011, the Disciplinary Committee of the competition found Iraklis guilty of forgery during the winter transfer window. Therefore, the club was automatically put at the end of the league table and demoted to the Football League. This development resulted in Asteras Tripolis remaining in Super League.

In the 2011–12 season, Asteras Tripolis reached the 6th place and failed to qualify for the Play-offs. However, AEK Athens was not licensed to play in the 2012–13 Europa League and therefore replaced by the 6th placed team in the league table, Asteras Tripolis. That was the first participation of the club in UEFA competitions. The season completed with another participation of the club in Greek Cup semi-finals, in which the team eliminated after an exciting 2nd leg match against Atromitos in Tripoli.

The 2012–13 season was one of the most memorable in Asteras Tripolis' history. The club competed in the UEFA Europa League second qualifying round and won its first qualification to a next round in European level, eliminating the Azerbaijani, Inter Baku.

2013 Greek Cup Final starting lineup vs. Olympiacos (4-5-1)

In Super League, the club took a step ahead, finishing third(and fourth in the play-offs) and secured a place for the 2013–14 Europa League. However, the highlight of the season was the outstanding road of the team, under the technical leadership of Sakis Tsiolis, to the first Greek Cup final in club's history. The "Arcadians" lost 1–3 against Olympiacos after extra time and as 13,000 supporters of the yellow-blues were at the Olympic Stadium of Athens.

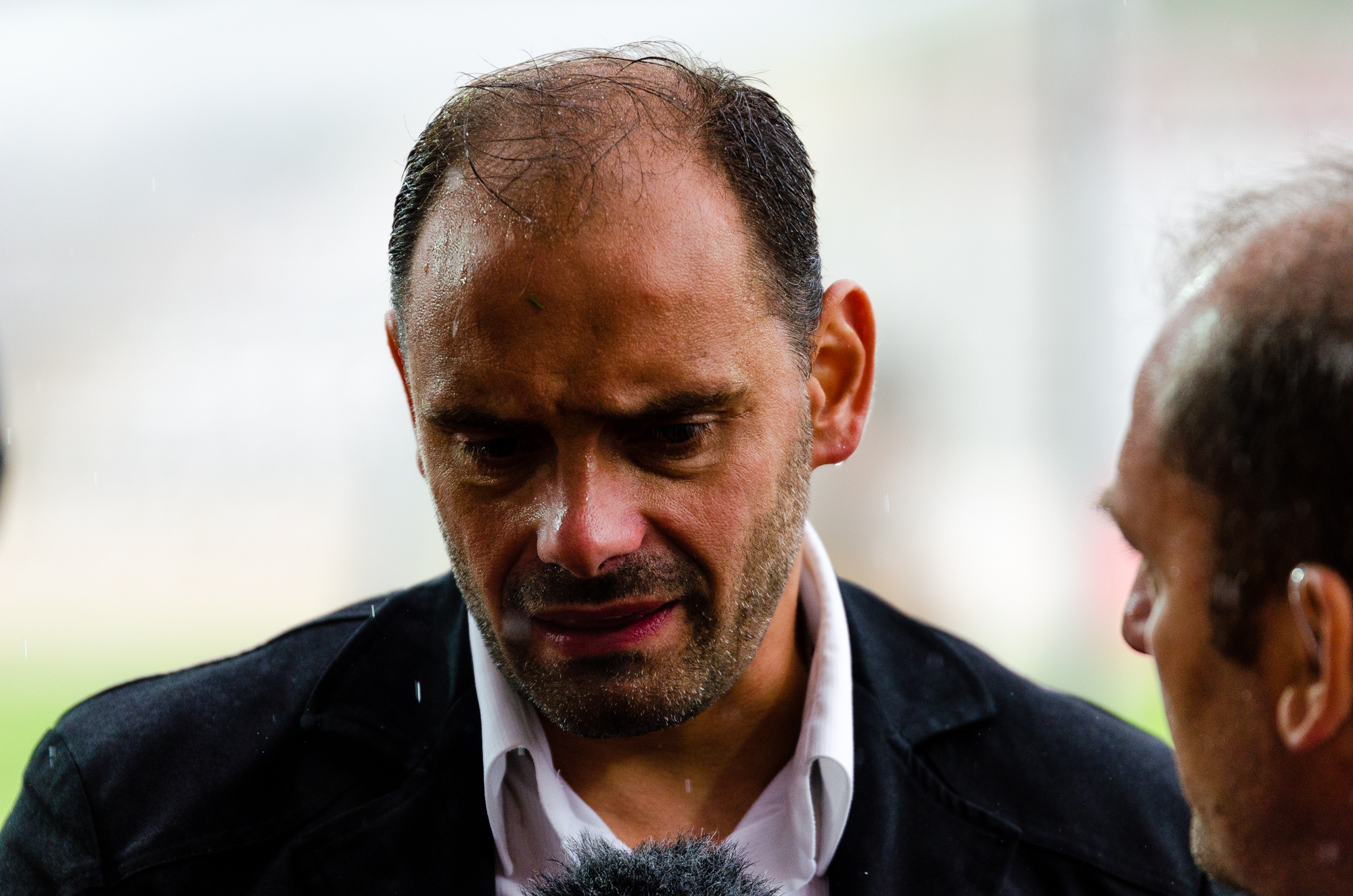
Staikos Vergetis managed the team during the UEFA Europa League of 2014–15 and 2015–16 seasons.

In the 2014–15 season, Asteras Tripolis took another step ahead in European level, reaching the 2014–15 UEFA Europa League group stage for the first time in club's history, after a streak of qualifications against RoPS, Mainz 05 and Maccabi Tel Aviv. In the Group C, Asteras Tripolis won six points and finished third against Tottenham Hotspur, Beşiktaş and Partizan. In Super league, Asteras Tripolis finished in 3rd place, its highest place in the league table until these days. Also, the main striker of the squad, Jerónimo Barrales, emerged top goalscorer in 2014-15 Super League Greece.

In the next season, 2015–16, Asteras Tripolis secured his direct participation in the Europa League group stage as finished third in the 2014-15 Super League. In the Group K, the club won four points and finished third again, with rivals Schalke 04, Sparta Prague and APOEL. Although during the 2016-17 Super League season, Asteras Tripolis finished 12th, in the next season, the club finished fifth, securing a place in the second qualifying round of 2018–19 Europa League.

== Crest and colours ==
=== Crest evolution ===
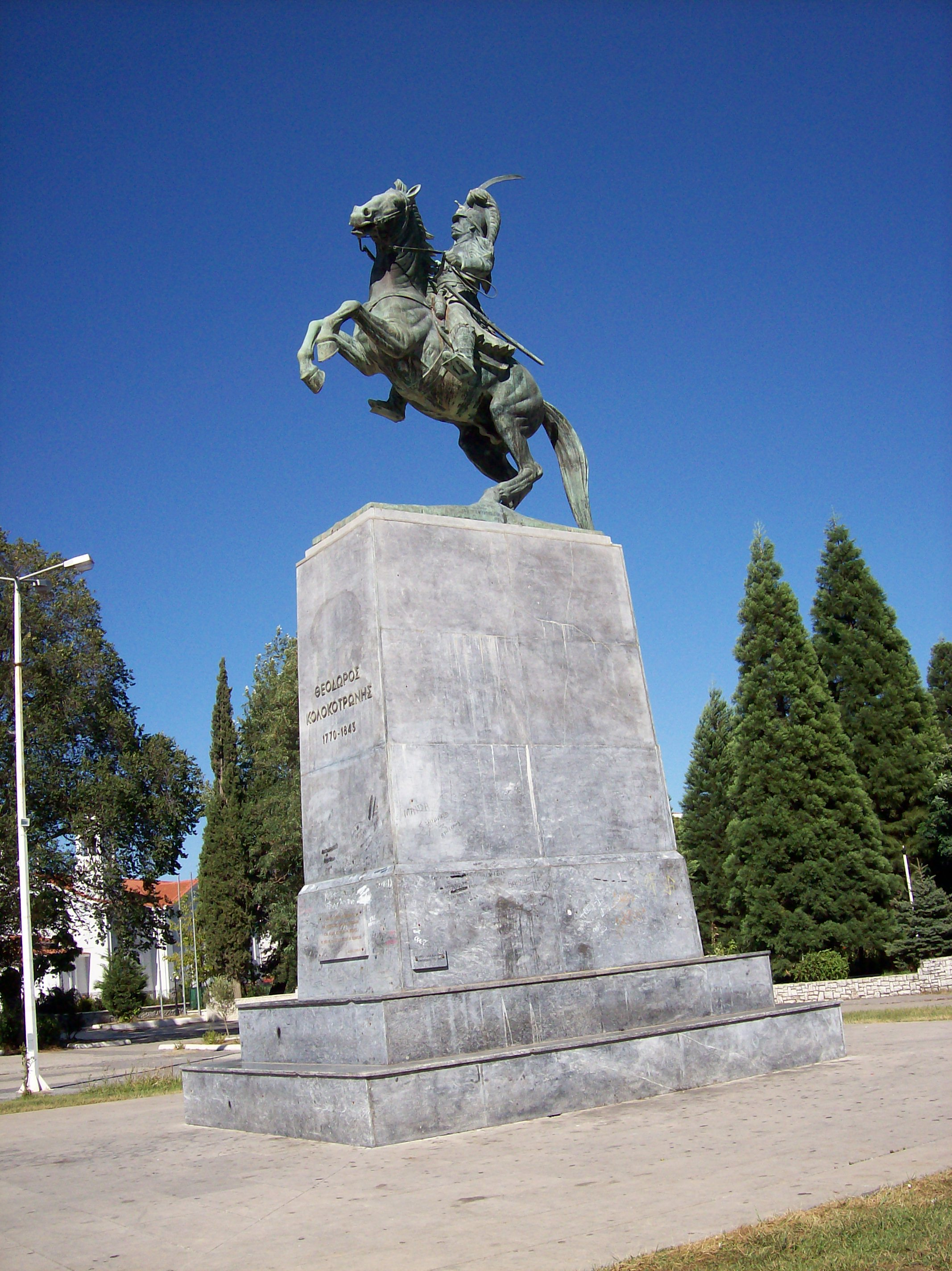
The crest of the club is inspired by the statue of Theodoros Kolokotronis

–2009

2009–2020

2020–present

The first crest of the club was a star symbol in the traditional colours of the team, blue, yellow and white. Blue symbolizes trust, faith, and self-confidence. Yellow, which is associated with energy and creation, symbolizes ambition. While white is considered the colour of perfection and hope, and signifies safety and cleanliness. In the following decades, various versions of the crest were introduced with minor changes. In 2009, the version that was to be associated with the club's most recent glorious days appeared for the first time, until the summer of 2020.

On 21 July 2020, with the motto "The story has no end", the club presented a new crest. The star symbol maintained in the highest position, as the symbol with which the club traveled through time, since 1931. Also, the new crest connects the club with the most special monument of Tripoli, the statue of Theodoros Kolokotronis, the Greek general and pre-eminent leader of the Greek War of Independence. The statue, located in Areos Square since September 1971, was made to present Theodoros Kolokotronis in battle and his bones are kept there. At the same time, with the phrase "ET IN ARCADIA EGO" written on it, the new crest seals the relationship of the club with the whole of Arcadia.

=== Kit evolution ===
Asteras Tripolis has undergone several changes in the design of its home kit since its founding, but the home colours have mainly remained blue and yellow, forming the club's identity. Over the years, the designs have ranged from traditional patterns to more modern, dynamic styles. The club through its kits has tried to convey various messages and reflect its history and values. They have also used black, pink, orange, white and a light green in recent seasons for their alternate kits.

Uniforms worn by the team:

2009–12	2014–15	2017–18	2018–19	2020–22	2021–22

=== Kit manufacturers and shirt sponsors ===
The following table shows in detail Asteras Tripolis kit manufacturers and shirt sponsors by year:

Kit manufacturer	Period	Shirt sponsor
Umbro	2003–06	—
Lotto	2006–10	OPAP
Lotto	2010–12	LOTTO
Nike	2012–15	LOTTO
Nike	2015–17	Stoiximan.gr
Macron	2017–18	Stoiximan.gr
Macron	2018–19	Volton
Macron	2019–20	Interwetten
Macron	2020–23	Volton
Macron	2023–24	Intrakat
Macron	2024–26	ΑKTOR
Nike	2026–27	ΑKTOR

== Stadium ==
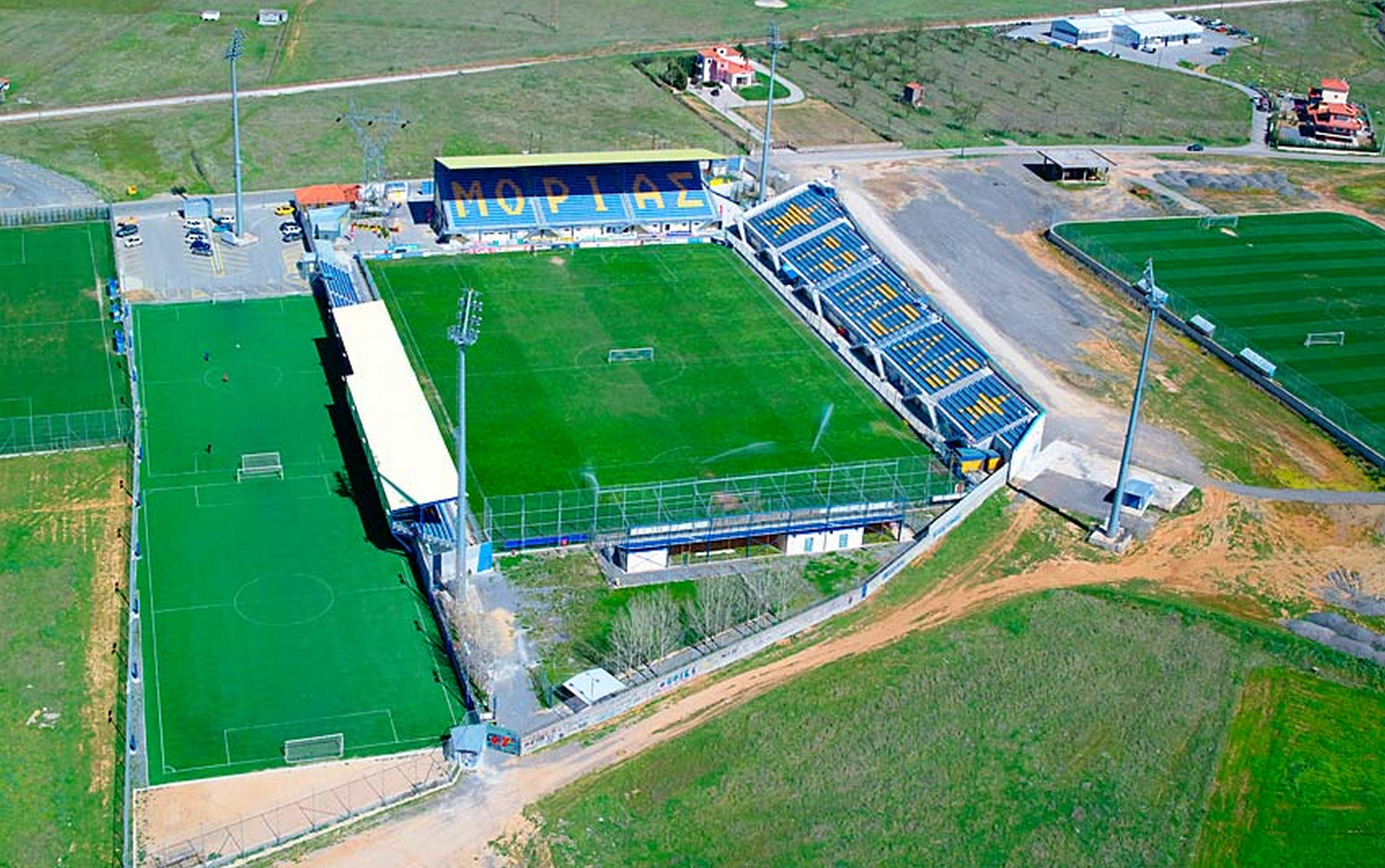
Aerial image of Theodoros Kolokotronis Stadium in 2011

Theodoros Kolokotronis Stadium (formally Asteras Tripolis Stadium) is a privately owned football stadium in Tripoli, Greece. Its capacity is 7,600. The stadium was built in 1979. After the team's promotion in the Football League in 2005, the stadium was renovated and its capacity expanded, including the east stand, which also houses the club's offices, a gym and changing rooms, a lounge, etc. In 2007, with the rise of Asteras Tripolis in the Super League, the western theater was built, housing the journalists and VIP posts, and a small square on the south side was also added for use mainly by the fans of the hosted team. In 2008, the northern beam was constructed. In 2010, the southern beam was reconstructed and expanded.

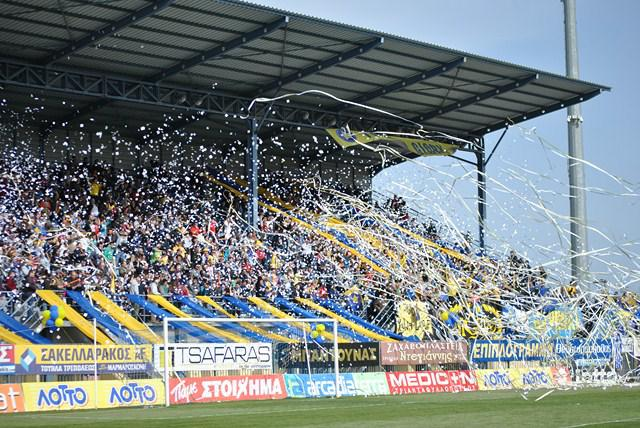
Asteras Tripolis fans during the 2011–12 Greek Football Cup semi-finals

In 2015, on the occasion of the Asteras Tripolis team's participation in the Europa League (2015–16) groups, for the second time in its history and the second consecutive parallel but also the fourth consecutive year of the group's presence in general (the first two only in the qualifiers), several remarkable renovations were carried out on the stadium, mainly in its interior, such as changing rooms and the press room, etc.

On 27 November 2011, in the match between Asteras Tripolis and Olympiacos for the 11th season of the championship (2011–12), the spectators arrived at the stadium with 6,150 tickets.

The stadium was renamed on 22 November 2012 in honour of the hero of the Greek War of Independence, Theodoros Kolokotronis.

Also, the club has proposed a new stadium, the New Asteras Tripolis Stadium.

== Domestic record ==
=== Divisional history ===
- 19 seasons in Super League Greece.
- 3 seasons in Second Division Greece.
- 1 season in Third Division Greece.
- 5 seasons in Fourth Division Greece.

=== Recent seasons ===
Season
Season	Division	Rank	Pld	W	D	L	GS	GA	Pts	Greek Cup
2005–06	3rd	1	32	22	7	3	56	19	73	Round of 32
2006–07	2nd	1	34	20	9	5	56	25	69	Round of 32
2007–08	1st	7	30	11	11	8	28	24	44	Round of 16
2008–09	1st	12	30	7	12	11	33	31	33	Semi-finals
2009–10	1st	12	30	10	6	14	29	36	36	Quarter-finals
2010–11	1st	13	30	7	10	13	21	29	31	Round of 16
2011–12	1st	6	30	13	6	11	30	34	45	Semi-finals
2012–13	1st	4	30	17	5	8	41	25	56	Runner-up
2013–14	1st	5	34	16	10	8	46	35	58	Round of 16
2014–15	1st	3	34	17	8	9	52	37	59	Round of 16
2015–16	1st	7	30	11	8	11	31	30	41	Quarter-finals
2016–17	1st	12	30	6	10	14	34	49	28	Quarter-finals
2017–18	1st	5	30	12	9	9	39	24	45	Round of 16
2018–19	1st	11	30	8	9	13	25	30	33	Semi-finals
2019–20	1st	7	33	11	10	12	44	42	42	Round of 16
2020–21	1st	6	36	12	15	9	36	38	51	First Round
2021–22	1st	9	33	11	8	14	33	37	41	Fifth Round
2022–23	1st	10	33	5	16	12	23	36	31	Fifth Round
2023–24	1st	8	33	11	5	17	40	55	38	Round of 16
2024–25	1st	6	32	13	5	14	35	40	44	Semi-finals
2025–26	1st	11	36	8	12	16	36	49	36	Play-offs

== European record ==
=== By season ===
As of 24 February 2026

Season	Competition	Round	Club	Home	Away	Aggregate
2012–13	UEFA Europa League	2Q	(Azerbaijan) Inter Baku	1–1	1–1	2–2 (4–2 p)
2012–13	UEFA Europa League	3Q	(Portugal) Marítimo	1–1	0–0	1–1 (a)
2013–14	UEFA Europa League	3Q	(Austria) Rapid Wien	1–1	1–3	2–4
2014–15	UEFA Europa League	2Q	(Finland) RoPS	4–2	1–1	5–3
2014–15	UEFA Europa League	3Q	(Germany) Mainz 05	3–1	0–1	3–2
2014–15	UEFA Europa League	PO	(Israel) Maccabi Tel Aviv	2–0	1–3	3–3 (a)
2014–15	UEFA Europa League	Group C	(England) Tottenham Hotspur	1–2	1–5	3rd place
2014–15	UEFA Europa League	Group C	(Turkey) Beşiktaş	2–2	1–1	3rd place
2014–15	UEFA Europa League	Group C	(Serbia) Partizan	2–0	0–0	3rd place
2015–16	UEFA Europa League	Group K	(Germany) Schalke 04	0–4	0–4	3rd place
2015–16	UEFA Europa League	Group K	(Cyprus) APOEL	2–0	1–2	3rd place
2015–16	UEFA Europa League	Group K	(Czech Republic) Sparta Prague	1–1	0–1	3rd place
2018–19	UEFA Europa League	2Q	(Scotland) Hibernian	1–1	2–3	3–4

Notes

- 1R: First round
- 2Q: Second qualifying round
- 3Q: Third qualifying round
- PO: Play-off round

=== Notable wins ===
Season	Match	Score
2014–15	Asteras Tripolis – Mainz 05	3–1
2014–15	Asteras Tripolis – Maccabi Tel Aviv	2–0
2014–15	Asteras Tripolis – Partizan	2–0
2015–16	Asteras Tripolis – APOEL	2–0

== Honours ==
=== Domestic ===
- Greek Football Cup
  - Runners-up (1): 2012–13
- Second Division Greece
  - Winners (1): 2006–07
- Third Division Greece
  - Winners (1): 2005–06
- Fourth Division Greece
  - Winners (1): 2004–05

=== Regional ===
- Arcadian Championship
  - Winners (8): 1957–58, 1958–59, 1959–60, 1960–61, 1961–62, 1987–88, 1989–90, 2002–03
- Arcadian Cup
  - Winners (4): 1988–89, 1989–90, 2003–04, 2004–05

== Players ==
=== Current squad ===
As of 21 October 2026

Note: Flags indicate national team as defined under FIFA eligibility rules; some limited exceptions apply. Players may hold more than one non-FIFA nationality.

No.	Pos.	Nation	Player
1	GK	GRE	Nikos Papadopoulos (vice-captain)
3	DF	MNE	Nikola Šipčić
5	MF	BLR	Yevgeny Yablonsky
6	DF	GRE	Konstantinos Chrysopoulos
7	MF	ARG	Julián Bartolo
8	MF	GRE	Giannis Bouzoukis
9	FW	ITA	Federico Macheda
10	MF	ESP	Eder González
11	MF	CMR	Kalvin Ketu
14	MF	ARG	Julián Chicco
16	DF	SWE	Franz Brorsson
17	DF	GRE	Alexandros Tereziou
19	MF	ARG	Franco Orozco (on loan from Lanús)
20	MF	GRE	Nikos Kaltsas (captain)
21	MF	GRE	Dimitrios Kourbelis

No.	Pos.	Nation	Player
22	DF	GRE	Chrysanthos Gezos
23	MF	ESP	Adrián Riera
27	DF	GRE	Giannis Kotsiras
28	DF	ESP	Alex Méndez
32	DF	MEX	Jordan Silva
33	FW	GRE	Giannis Gitersos
39	FW	BRA	Ricardinho
44	MF	GRE	Antonis Papakanellos (on loan from Olympiacos)
51	GK	GRE	Giannis Kriaras
61	GK	GRE	Vasilios Chatziemmanouil
64	DF	GRE	Panagiotis Deligiannidis
71	GK	GRE	Spyros Angelidis
74	DF	GRE	Dimitrios Laskaris
75	MF	SWE	Benjamin Kimpioka
80	MF	ARG	Bruno Pérez (on loan from Deportivo Madryn)
91	GK	GRE	Theofilos Kakadiaris

=== Records and statistics ===
Information correct as of the match played on 20 September 2026. Bold denotes an active player for the club.
The tables refer to Asteras Tripolis' players in Super League Greece, Greek Football Cup, Second Division Greece, Third Division Greece and UEFA Europa League.

==== Top 10 Most Capped Players ====
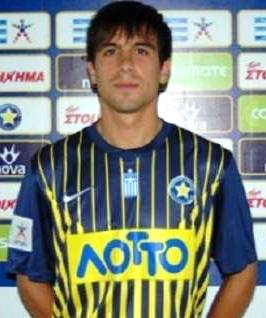
Juan Munafo is the most-capped player of Asteras Tripolis in professional football

Rank	Player	Years	App
1	(Argentina) Juan Munafo	2013–2015, 2017–2024	277
2	(Argentina) Matías Iglesias	2015–2023	217
3	(Greece) **Nikos Papadopoulos**	2018–	200
4	(Greece) **Nikos Kaltsas**	2016–2019, 2023–	197
5	(Argentina) Jerónimo Barrales	2013–2015, 2019–2023	195
6	(Spain) Xesc Regis	2019–2025	177
7	(Greece) **Giannis Kotsiras**	2016–2021, 2026–	147
8	(Argentina) Federico Álvarez	2020–2025	145
9	(Greece) Nikos Lazaridis	2006–2010	144
10	(Spain) José Luis Valiente (Greece) **Dimitris Kourbelis**	2018–2024; 2011–2016, 2026–	143

==== Top 10 Goalscorers ====
Rank	Player	Years	Goals
1	(Argentina) Jerónimo Barrales	2013–2015, 2019–2023	59
2	(Croatia) Danijel Cesarec	2007–2010	29
3	(Greece) **Nikos Kaltsas**	2016–2019, 2023–	28
4	(Greece) Michalis Manias	2017–2019	27
5	(Argentina) **Julián Bartolo**	2022–	26
6	(Greece) Michalis Klokidis (Note: Michalis Klokidis, including the 2004-05 season in the Fourth Division Greece (39 goals), has scored a total of 64 goals with Asteras Tripolis.) (Spain) Xesc Regis	2004–2007; 2019–2025	25
7	(Argentina) Pablo Mazza	2014–2017	23
8	(Argentina) Pablo de Blasis (Argentina) Lucio Filomeno	2012–2014; 2007–2009	20
9	(Brazil) Rogério Martins (Note: Rogerio Martins scored the first ever goal for Asteras Tripolis in Super League Greece.) (Spain) Rubén Rayos (Argentina) Matías Iglesias (Spain) Luis Fernández (Italy) **Federico Macheda**	2005–2008, 2010–2012; 2011–2013; 2015–2023; 2019–2021; 2024–	18
10	(Argentina) Emanuel Perrone	2011–2013	17

== Personnel ==
Executive
Owners	(Greece) Dimitrios Bakos (Greece) Giannis Kaimenakis
President	(Greece) Georgios Borovilos
A' Vice-President	(Greece) Dimitrios Kenes
B' Vice-President	(Greece) Dimitrios Borovilos
Coaching staff
Head coach	(Greece) Georgios Antonopoulos
Assistant head coach	(Greece) Vangelis Disios
Fitness coach	(Greece) Sotiris Roussis (Greece) Georgios Kivrakidis
Goalkeeper coach	(Greece) Panagiotis Pomonis (Greece) Georgios Manelis
Performance coach	(Greece) Theodoros Tsilimigras

=== Coaching history ===
- (Greece) Giannis Petrakis (2004 – 6 January 2006)
- (Greece) Lysandros Georgamlis (January 2006 – 6 May)
- (Greece) Giannis Papakostas (June 2006 – 6 December)
- (Brazil) Paulo Campos (29 November 2006 – 2 February 2008)
- (Greece) Panagiotis Tzanavaras (25 February 2008 – 13 May 2008)
- (Portugal) Carlos Carvalhal (14 May 2008 – 15 October 2008)
- (Greece) Nikos Kostenoglou (20 November 2008 – 18 May 2009)
- (Argentina) Mario Gómez (1 July 2009 – 25 October 2009)
- (Greece) Vangelis Vlachos (26 October 2009 – 17 January 2011)
- (Greece) Pavlos Dermitzakis (21 January 2011 – 17 May 2011)
- (Spain) Óscar Fernández (15 June 2011 – 19 September 2011)
- (Portugal) Horácio Gonçalves (19 September 2011 – 7 November 2011)
- (Greece) Sakis Tsiolis (9 November 2011 – 30 September 2013)
- (Greece) Staikos Vergetis (2 October 2013 – 29 January 2016)
- (Greece) Dimitrios Terezopoulos (30 January 2016 – 28 February 2016)
- (Greece) Makis Chavos (29 February 2016 – 26 September 2016)
- (Greece) Dimitrios Eleftheropoulos (27 September 2016 – 18 February 2017)
- (Greece) Apostolos Charalampidis (19 February 2016 – 8 March 2017)
- (Greece) Staikos Vergetis (9 March 2017 – 10 September 2017)
- (Greece) Savvas Pantelidis (10 September 2017 – 12 November 2018)
- (Greece) Georgios Paraschos (12 November 2018 – 17 May 2019)
- (Spain) Borja Jiménez (6 July 2019 – 4 December 2019)
- (Serbia) Milan Rastavac (5 December 2019 – 15 May 2022)
- (Germany) Iraklis Metaxas (9 June 2022 – 23 December 2023)
- (Greece) Akis Mantzios (4 January 2023 – 4 April 2023)
- (Greece) Giannis Douvikas (10 April 2023 – 30 June 2023)
- (Serbia) Milan Rastavac (1 July 2023 – 3 September 2024)
- (France) Claude Makélélé (12 September 2024 – 7 October 2024)
- (Greece) Savvas Pantelidis (October 2024 – October 2025)
- (Wales) Chris Coleman (October 2025 – January 2026)
- (Serbia) Milan Rastavac (January 2026 – March 2026)
- (Greece) Georgios Antonopoulos (March 2026 – October 2026)
- (Portugal) Gonçalo Feio (November 2026 – )

== See also ==
- Tigers Ultras
