= Vasilios Chatziemmanouil =

Greek footballer (born 1999)

Personal information
- Date of birth: 9 August 1999 (age 27)
- Place of birth: Nea Makri, East Attica, Greece
- Height: 1.88 m (6 ft 2 in)
- Position: Goalkeeper

Team information
- Current team: Asteras Tripolis
- Number: 61

Youth career
- 2008–2018: AEK Athens

Senior career*
Years	Team	Apps	(Gls)
2018–2025	AEK Athens	1	(0)
2018–2019	→ Agioi Anargyroi (loan)	7	(0)
2019–2020	→ Fostiras (loan)	23	(0)
2021–2025	AEK Athens B	31	(0)
2023–2024	→ Lamia (loan)	2	(0)
2025	Chania	2	(0)
2025–	Asteras Tripolis B	13	(0)
2026–	Asteras Tripolis	7	(0)

International career^{‡}
2016	Greece U17	1	(0)
- * Club domestic league appearances and goals as of 13 September 2026 ‡ National team caps and goals as of 10 February 2016

Vasilios Chatziemmanouil (Greek: Βασίλειος Χατζηεμμανουήλ; born 9 August 1999) is a Greek professional footballer who plays as a goalkeeper who plays as a goalkeeper for Super League club Asteras Tripolis.

== Career ==
=== AEK Athens ===
Chatziemmanouil made his debut for the senior team in a 0–2 away victory over Atromitos in January 2022, where he kept a clean sheet.

On 2 August 2022, Chatziemmanouil signed a new contract, running until the summer of 2026.

== Honours ==
AEK Athens

- Super League: 2022–23
- Greek Cup: 2022–23
