= Theodosis Macheras =

Greek association football player (born 2000)

Personal information
- Full name: Theodosios Macheras
- Date of birth: 9 May 2000 (age 26)
- Place of birth: Leros, Greece
- Height: 1.79 m (5 ft 10 1/2 in)
- Position: Left winger

Team information
- Current team: Niki Volos
- Number: 53

Youth career
- 2016–2018: Panionios
- 2018–2020: AEK Athens

Senior career*
Years	Team	Apps	(Gls)
2020–2025	AEK Athens	19	(1)
2021–2022	→ Ionikos (loan)	1	(0)
2022–2025	AEK Athens B	26	(5)
2023	→ Volos (loan)	9	(0)
2024–2025	→ Vitesse (loan)	26	(3)
2025–2026	Iraklis	17	(3)
2026–	Niki Volos	0	(0)

International career^{‡}
2018–2019	Greece U18	3	(0)
2020–2021	Greece U21	5	(1)
- * Club domestic league appearances and goals as of March 20, 2026 ‡ National team caps and goals as of June 5, 2021

Theodosis Macheras (Greek: Θεοδόσης Μαχαίρας; born 9 May 2000) is a Greek professional footballer who plays as a left winger for Super League 2 club Niki Volos.

== Career ==
=== AEK Athens ===
On 1 March 2020, Macheras made his official debut in a 1–1 away draw against Panionios. On 22 November 2020, he scored his first professional goal, helping to a 4–1 home win against AEL.

On 2 February 2021, Macheras signed a new contract, running until the summer of 2026.

==== Loan to Ionikos ====
On 4 August 2021, Macheras joined Ionikos on a season long-loan. On 4 August in a friendly match against Panionios, he suffered a cruciate ligament tear in his right knee, and missed most of the season, managing to appear only once for the club of Nikaia.

==== Loan to Volos ====
On 21 August 2023, he joined Volos on a season long-loan.

==== Loan to Vitesse ====
On 2 September 2024, Macheras moved on loan to Vitesse in the Netherlands.

== Career statistics ==
As of 26 March 2026

Club	Season	League			Cup		Continental		Other		Total	
Club	Season	Division	Apps	Goals	Apps	Goals	Apps	Goals	Apps	Goals	Apps	Goals
AEK Athens	2019–20	Superleague Greece	2	0	1	0	—		—		3	0
AEK Athens	2020–21	Superleague Greece	16	1	4	0	5	0	—		25	1
AEK Athens	2022–23	Superleague Greece	1	0	2	2	—		—		3	2
AEK Athens	Total		19	1	7	2	5	0	—		31	3
Ionikos (loan)	2021–22	Superleague Greece	1	0	0	0	—		—		1	0
AEK Athens B	2022–23	Superleague Greece 2	11	2	—		—		—		11	2
AEK Athens B	2023–24	Superleague Greece 2	15	3	—		—		—		15	3
AEK Athens B	Total		26	5	—		—		—		26	5
Volos (loan)	2023–24	Superleague Greece	9	0	1	0	—		—		10	0
Vitesse (loan)	2024–25	Eerste Divisie	26	3	0	0	—		—		26	3
Iraklis	2025–26	Superleague Greece 2	17	3	3	0	—		—		20	3
Career total			98	12	11	2	5	0	0	0	114	14

== Honours ==
AEK Athens

- Super League: 2022–23
- Greek Cup: 2022–23
