= Vasilios Vitlis =

Greek association football player (born 1993)

Vasilis Vitlis
Personal information
- Full name: Vasilios Vitlis
- Date of birth: 28 October 1993 (age 33)
- Place of birth: Nea Tenedos, Greece
- Height: 1.80 m (5 ft 11 in)
- Position: Left-back

Team information
- Current team: Anagennisi Karditsa
- Number: 31

Senior career*
| Years | Team | Apps | (Gls) |
| 2011–2014 | Digenis Lakkoma | | |
| 2014–2015 | Kavala | | |
| 2015 | Panserraikos | | |
| 2015–2019 | Doxa Drama | | |
| 2019 | Iraklis | 16 | (1) |
| 2019–2022 | Apollon Smyrni | 43 | (0) |
| 2022–2024 | Iraklis | 53 | (2) |
| 2024–2025 | Lamia | 17 | (0) |
| 2025–2026 | Iraklis | 16 | (0) |
| 2026– | Anagennisi Karditsa | 0 | (0) |
- * Club domestic league appearances and goals as of March 22, 2026

Vasilis Vitlis (Greek: Βασίλης Βιτλής; born 28 October 1993) is a Greek professional association football player who plays as a left-back for Super League 2 club Anagennisi Karditsa.
