= Nassim Hnid =

Tunisian footballer

Personal information
- Date of birth: 12 March 1997 (age 29)
- Place of birth: Zarzis, Tunisia
- Height: 1.90 m (6 ft 3 in)
- Position: Centre-back

Team information
- Current team: Étoile Sportive du Sahel

Senior career*
Years	Team	Apps	(Gls)
2016–2020	Sfaxien	53	(1)
2020–2022	AEK Athens	10	(0)
2021–2022	→ Al-Sailiya (loan)	13	(0)
2023	Žalgiris	22	(2)
2024–	Étoile Sportive du Sahel	13	(0)

International career^{‡}
2018–2019	Tunisia U23	3	(0)
2019–	Tunisia	2	(0)
- * Club domestic league appearances and goals as of 16:50, 8 March 2025 (UTC) ‡ National team caps and goals as of 11:16, 25 July 2019 (UTC)

Nassim Hnid (born 12 March 1997) is a Tunisian professional footballer who plays as a centre-back for Étoile Sportive du Sahel.

== Career ==
On 20 August 2020, Hnid joined Super League Greece club AEK Athens. AEK Athens reportedly paid a transfer fee of €600,000 to CS Sfaxien, while Hnid signed a four-year contract.

On 16 November 2023, A Lyga club Žalgiris announced the termination of Hnid's contract.

== Career statistics ==
As of matches played on 25 July 2019

Appearances and goals by national team and year
National team	Year	Apps	Goals
Tunisia	2019	2	0
Total		2	0
