= Rodrigo Colombo =

Argentine footballer (born 1992)

Personal information
- Full name: Rodrigo Jesús Colombo
- Date of birth: 19 November 1992 (age 33)
- Place of birth: San Marcos Sud, Argentina
- Height: 1.92 m (6 ft 3 1/2 in)
- Position: Centre-back

Team information
- Current team: Curicó Unido
- Number: 4

Youth career
- Atlético Rafaela

Senior career*
| Years | Team | Apps | (Gls) |
| 2011–2016 | Atlético Rafaela | 21 | (0) |
| 2017 | Universitario de Sucre | 31 | (2) |
| 2018 | Sport Huancayo | 29 | (3) |
| 2019–2020 | Independiente Rivadavia | 26 | (1) |
| 2020–2021 | Volos | 14 | (1) |
| 2021 | Deportivo Maipú | 10 | (0) |
| 2022 | Atlanta | 30 | (2) |
| 2022–2023 | Sport Huancayo | 33 | (2) |
| 2024 | Atlético Rafaela | 21 | (1) |
| 2025 | Sport Boys | 28 | (0) |
| 2026– | Curicó Unido | 1 | (0) |
- * Club domestic league appearances and goals as of 24 February 2026

Rodrigo Jesús Colombo (born 19 November 1992) is an Argentine professional footballer who plays as a centre-back for Chilean club Curicó Unido.

== Career ==
Colombo started in the youth of the Argentine Primera División club Atlético de Rafaela. His first taste of senior football was when he was selected as a substitute for a Copa Argentina tie against Banfield in March 2012. He went onto make his senior debut in the same competition on 19 June 2013 in a loss to San Lorenzo. He made another Copa Argentina appearance before making his league debut in an away defeat to Huracán during the 2015 campaign. On 2 April 2016, Colombo was sent off for the first time in a Primera División match against Boca Juniors. He left Rafaela in January 2017 after the end of his contract.

In January 2017, Colombo joined Bolivian Primera División side Universitario de Sucre. He made his debut on 23 January in a Copa Libertadores match against Montevideo Wanderers. A move to Instituto fell through in August 2017. On 7 January 2018, Sport Huancayo of the Peruvian Primera División signed Colombo. Goals against Deportivo Binacional, Deportivo Municipal and Sport Rosario followed across thirty-four appearances in all competitions; the same tally he notched in Bolivia. In January 2019, Colombo signed for Independiente Rivadavia under Gabriel Gómez; who had tried to sign him for Instituto.

After eighteen months and one goal in twenty-eight matches with Independiente Rivadavia, Colombo headed to Greece with Super League side Volos in August 2020. His debut came on 13 September against Atromitos, which preceded his first goal arriving on 30 November versus Apollon Smyrnis.

In January 2026, Colombo moved to Chile and joined Curicó Unido.

== Career statistics ==
As of 29 December 2020

Appearances and goals by club, season and competition
| Club | Season | League | | | Cup | | Continental | | Other | | Total | |
| Club | Season | Division | Apps | Goals | Apps | Goals | Apps | Goals | Apps | Goals | Apps | Goals |
|---|---|---|---|---|---|---|---|---|---|---|---|---|
| Atlético de Rafaela | 2011–12 | Argentine Primera División | 0 | 0 | 0 | 0 | — | | 0 | 0 | 0 | 0 |
| Atlético de Rafaela | 2012–13 | Argentine Primera División | 0 | 0 | 1 | 0 | — | | 0 | 0 | 1 | 0 |
| Atlético de Rafaela | 2013–14 | Argentine Primera División | 0 | 0 | 0 | 0 | — | | 0 | 0 | 0 | 0 |
| Atlético de Rafaela | 2014 | Argentine Primera División | 0 | 0 | 0 | 0 | — | | 0 | 0 | 0 | 0 |
| Atlético de Rafaela | 2015 | Argentine Primera División | 8 | 0 | 2 | 0 | — | | 0 | 0 | 10 | 0 |
| Atlético de Rafaela | 2016 | Argentine Primera División | 8 | 0 | 1 | 1 | — | | 0 | 0 | 9 | 1 |
| Atlético de Rafaela | 2016–17 | Argentine Primera División | 5 | 0 | 0 | 0 | — | | 0 | 0 | 5 | 0 |
| Atlético de Rafaela | Total | | 21 | 0 | 4 | 1 | 0 | 0 | 0 | 0 | 25 | 1 |
| Universitario de Sucre | 2016–17 | Bolivian Primera División | 31 | 2 | — | | 2 (Note: Appearance(s) in the Copa Libertadores) | 0 | 1 (Note: Appearance(s) in the Bolivian Primera División play-offs) | 0 | 34 | 2 |
| Sport Huancayo | 2018 | Peruvian Primera División | 29 | 3 | — | | 3 (Note: Appearance(s) in the Copa Sudamericana) | 0 | 2 (Note: Appearance(s) in the Peruvian Primera División play-offs) | 0 | 34 | 3 |
| Independiente Rivadavia | 2018–19 | Primera B Nacional | 6 | 0 | 1 | 0 | — | | 0 | 0 | 7 | 0 |
| Independiente Rivadavia | 2019–20 | Primera B Nacional | 20 | 1 | 1 | 0 | — | | 0 | 0 | 21 | 1 |
| Independiente Rivadavia | Total | | 26 | 1 | 2 | 0 | 0 | 0 | 0 | 0 | 28 | 1 |
| Volos | 2020–21 | Super League Greece | 12 | 1 | 0 | 0 | — | | 0 | 0 | 12 | 1 |
| Career total | | | 119 | 6 | 6 | 1 | 5 | 0 | 3 | 0 | 133 | 7 |
