= 2021 Greek Football Cup final =

2021 Greek Cup final
- Match poster
- Event: 2020–21 Greek Football Cup
Olympiacos	PAOK
1	2
- Date: 22 May 2021
- Venue: Olympic Stadium, Marousi, Athens
- Man of the Match: Michael Krmenčík (PAOK)
- Referee: Danny Makkelie (Netherlands)
- Attendance: Behind closed doors
- Weather: Fair; 19 °C (66 °F); 52% humidity

The 2021 Greek Cup final was the 77th final of the Greek Cup. It took place on 22 May 2021 at the Olympic Stadium. The contesting teams were Olympiacos and PAOK. It was Olympiacos' forty-first Greek Cup final and second consecutive, in their 96 years of existence and PAOK's twenty first Greek Cup final of their 95-year history.

== Venue ==
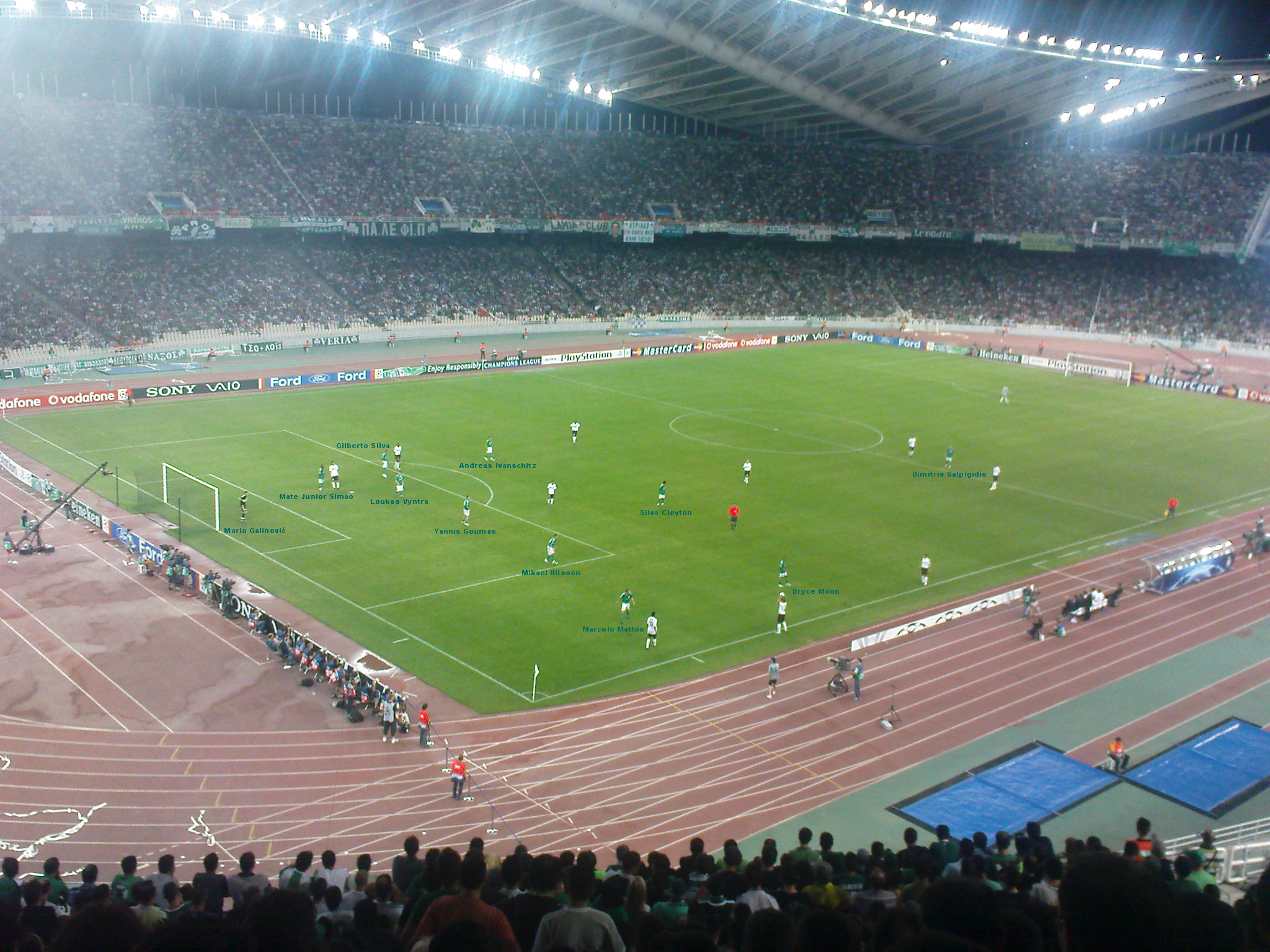
Athens Olympic Stadium.

This was the twenty fifth Greek Cup final held at the Athens Olympic Stadium, after the 1983, 1984, 1985, 1986, 1987, 1988, 1989, 1990, 1993, 1994, 1995, 1996, 1999, 2000, 2002, 2009, 2010, 2011, 2012, 2013, 2014, 2015, 2016, 2018 and 2019 finals.

The Athens Olympic Stadium was built in 1982 and renovated once in 2004. The stadium is used as a venue for AEK Athens and Greece and was used for Olympiacos and Panathinaikos on various occasions. Its current capacity is 69,618 and it hosted three European Cup/UEFA Champions League finals in 1983, 1994 and 2007, a UEFA Cup Winners' Cup final in 1987, the 1991 Mediterranean Games and the 2004 Summer Olympics.

== Background ==
Olympiacos had reached the Greek Cup final thirty nine times, winning twenty eight of them. The last time that they had played in a final was in 2020, where they had won against AEK Athens by 1–0.

PAOK had reached the Greek Cup final twenty times, winning seven of them. The last time that they had played in a final was in 2019, where they had won against AEK Athens by 1–0.

The two teams had met each other in a Cup final seven times in the 1951, 1971, 1973, 1974, 1981, 1992 and 2001 finals.

== Route to the final ==
Olympiacos				Round	PAOK			
Opponent	Agg.	1st leg	2nd leg		Opponent	Agg.	1st leg	2nd leg
Panetolikos	6–0	3–0 (A)	3–0 (H)	First round	AEL	7–1	5–0 (H)	2–1 (A)
Aris	3–2	2–1 (H)	1–1 (A)	Quarter-finals	Lamia	6–3	5–2 (H)	1–1 (A)
PAS Giannina	4–1	1–1 (A)	3–1 (H)	Semi-finals	AEK Athens	3–1	1–0 (A)	2–1 (H)

== Match ==
=== Details ===
22 May 2021
21:00 EEST

Olympiacos	1–2	PAOK
M'Vila 50'	Report	Vieirinha 36' (pen.); Krmenčík 90'

Olympic Stadium, Marousi
Attendance: Behind closed doors
Referee: Danny Makkelie (Netherlands)

Olympiacos	PAOK

GK	1	(Portugal) José Sá
CB	3	(Portugal) Rúben Semedo
CB	15	(Greece) Sokratis Papastathopoulos	(substituted off) 25'
CB	6	(France) Yann M'Vila
RWB	14	(Greece) Thanasis Androutsos
CM	4	(Guinea) Mady Camara	(substituted off) 90+1'
CM	5	(Greece) Andreas Bouchalakis (c)
LWB	25	(Greece) José Holebas
RW	27	(Portugal) Bruma	(substituted off) 46'
LW	19	(Greece) Georgios Masouras	(substituted off) 86'
CF	11	(Morocco) Youssef El-Arabi
Substitutes:
GK	88	(Greece) Konstantinos Tzolakis
DF	61	(Greece) Alexios Kalogeropoulos
DF	45	(Moldova) Oleg Reabciuk	(substituted on) 25'
DF	72	(France) Kenny Lala
MF	8	(Portugal) Tiago Silva
MF	28	(France) Mathieu Valbuena	(substituted on) 90+1'
ΜF	7	(Greece) Kostas Fortounis	(substituted on) 46'
FW	97	(Serbia) Lazar Ranđelović
FW	9	(Egypt) Ahmed Hassan	(substituted on) 86'
Manager:
(Portugal) Pedro Martins

GK	31	(Greece) Alexandros Paschalakis
CB	20	(Portugal) Vieirinha (c)
CB	5	(Cape Verde) Fernando Varela
CB	15	(Spain) José Ángel Crespo
RWB	2	(Brazil) Rodrigo Soares
CM	22	(Austria) Stefan Schwab	(yellow card) 90+2'
CM	33	(Brazil) Douglas Augusto	(yellow card) 45+1'
LWB	21	(Ghana) Baba Rahman		(substituted off) 90+5'
RW	14	(Serbia) Andrija Živković
LW	8	(Egypt) Amr Warda		(substituted off) 80'
CF	9	(Poland) Karol Świderski		(substituted off) 80'
Substitutes:
GK	88	(Serbia) Živko Živković
DF	6	(Albania) Enea Mihaj		(substituted on) 90+5'
DF	19	(Greece) Lefteris Lyratzis
MF	51	(Greece) Theocharis Tsingaras		(substituted on) 80'
MF	7	(Morocco) Omar El Kaddouri
MF	10	(Austria) Thomas Murg
MF	65	(Greece) Giannis Konstantelias
FW	11	(Greece) Christos Tzolis
FW	27	(Czech Republic) Michael Krmenčík		(substituted on) 80'
Manager:
(Uruguay) Pablo García

Man of the Match:
(Czech Republic) Michael Krmenčík (PAOK)

Assistant referees:
Hessel Steegstra (Netherlands)
Jan de Vries (Netherlands)
Fourth official:
Dimitrios Karantonis (Imathia)
Video assistant referee:
Kevin Blom (Netherlands)
Assistant video assistant referee:
Tryfon Petropoulos (Arcadia)

Match rules

- 90 minutes
- 30 minutes of extra time if necessary
- Penalty shoot-out if scores still level
- Nine named substitutes, of which up to five may be used at maximum three times, with a sixth allowed in extra time.
