= 2020–21 Olympiacos F.C. season =

Olympiacos
2020–21 season
- Owner: Evangelos Marinakis
- President: Evangelos Marinakis
- Manager: Pedro Martins
- Stadium: Karaiskakis Stadium
- Super League Greece: 1st
- Greek Cup: Runners-up
- Champions League: Group stage
- Europa League: Round of 16
- Top goalscorer: League: Youssef El-Arabi (22); All: Youssef El-Arabi (28)
- Biggest win: Lamia 0–6 Olympiacos
- Biggest defeat: Manchester City 3–0 Olympiacos
| Home colours | Away colours | Third colours |

The 2020–21 season was the 96th season in existence of Olympiacos and the club's 62nd consecutive season in the top flight of Greek football. The season was affected by the COVID-19 pandemic and all Olympiacos' games were played behind closed doors. Olympiacos participated in the Greek Super League winning their 46th title, finishing 26 points ahead of PAOK who came second. Domestically the team participated in the Greek Football Cup as well. They reached the final where they lost to PAOK. Olympiacos qualified also for the UEFA Champions League group stage for a second consecutive season but failed to qualify to the knock-out phase. Having finished third in their group, they were then transferred to UEFA Europa League knockout phase. The season covers the period from 20 August 2020 to 22 May 2021.

== Players ==
=== First team ===
As of 10 February 2021

| Squad No. | Name | Nationality | Position(s) | Place of birth | Date of birth (Age) | Previous club |
Goalkeepers
| 1 | José Sá | (Portugal) | GK | Braga, Portugal | 17 January 1993 (28) | (Portugal) Porto |
| 31 | Ögmundur Kristinsson | (Iceland) | GK | Reykjavík, Iceland | 19 June 1989 (31) | (Greece) AEL |
| 44 | Ilias Karargyris | (Greece) | GK | Nafplio, Greece | 29 June 2002 (18) | (Greece) Olympiacos U19 |
| 88 | Konstantinos Tzolakis | (Greece) | GK | Chania, Greece | 8 November 2002 (18) | (Greece) Olympiacos U19 |
Defenders
| 3 | Rúben Semedo | (Portugal) | CB | Amadora, Portugal | 4 April 1994 (26) | (Spain) Villarreal |
| 15 | Sokratis Papastathopoulos | (Greece) | CB | Kalamata, Greece | 9 June 1988 (32) | (England) Arsenal |
| 21 | Mohamed Dräger | (Tunisia) (Germany) | RB/RW | Freiburg im Breisgau, Germany | 25 June 1996 (24) | (Germany) SC Freiburg |
| 24 | Ousseynou Ba | (Senegal) | CB | Dakar, Senegal | 11 November 1995 (25) | (France) Gazélec Ajaccio |
| 25 | José Holebas | (Greece) (Germany) | LB/CB | Aschaffenburg, Germany | 27 June 1984 (36) | (England) Watford |
| 34 | Avraam Papadopoulos | (Greece) | CB | Melbourne, Australia | 3 December 1984 (36) | (Australia) Brisbane Roar |
| 45 | Oleg Reabciuk | (Moldova) (Portugal) | LB | Charneca de Caparica, Portugal | 16 January 1998 (23) | (Portugal) Paços de Ferreira |
| 72 | Kenny Lala | (France) | RB | Villepinte, France | 3 October 1991 (29) | (France) Strasbourg |
Midfielders
| 4 | Mady Camara | (Guinea) | CM | Matam, Guinea | 28 February 1997 (23) | (France) Ajaccio |
| 5 | Andreas Bouchalakis | (Greece) | DM/CM | Heraklion, Greece | 5 April 1993 (27) | (Greece) Ergotelis |
| 6 | Yann M'Vila | (France) | DM | Amiens, France | 29 June 1993 (30) | (France) Saint-Étienne |
| 7 | Kostas Fortounis | (Greece) | AM | Trikala, Greece | 16 October 1992 (28) | (Germany) Kaiserslautern |
| 8 | Tiago Silva | (Portugal) | CM | Lisbon, Portugal | 2 June 1993 (27) | (England) Nottingham Forest |
| 14 | Thanasis Androutsos | (Greece) | RB/RW/AM | Athens, Greece | 6 May 1997 (23) | (Greece) Olympiacos U19 |
| 17 | Marios Vrousai | (Greece) | LW/RW | Nafpaktos, Greece | 2 July 1998 (22) | (Greece) Olympiacos U19 |
| 19 | Georgios Masouras | (Greece) | LW/RW | Kechrinia, Greece | 1 January 1994 (27) | (Greece) Panionios |
| 27 | Bruma | (Portugal) (Guinea-Bissau) | LW/RW | Bissau, Guinea-Bissau | 24 October 1994 (26) | (Netherlands) PSV Eindhoven |
| 28 | Mathieu Valbuena | (France) | LW/RW/AM | Bruges, France | 28 September 1984 (36) | (Turkey) Fenerbahçe |
| 90 | Vasilis Sourlis | (Greece) | AM | Aigaleo, Greece | 16 November 2002 (18) | (Greece) Olympiacos U19 |
| 97 | Lazar Ranđelović | (Serbia) | RW | Pertate, Serbia | 5 August 1997 (23) | (Serbia) Radnički Niš |
Forwards
| 9 | Ahmed Hassan | (Egypt) (Portugal) | FW | Cairo, Egypt | 5 March 1993 (27) | (Portugal) Braga |
| 11 | Youssef El-Arabi | (Morocco) (France) | FW | Caen, France | 3 February 1987 (33) | (Qatar) Al-Duhail |
| 20 | Hugo Cuypers | (Belgium) | FW | Liège, Belgium | 7 February 1997 (23) | (Greece) Ergotelis |

=== Out on loan ===
As of 8 February 2021

| Name | Nationality | Position(s) | Date of birth (Age) | To Club | Notes |
|---|---|---|---|---|---|
| Pape Abou Cissé | (Senegal) | CB | 14 September 1995 (25) | (France) Saint-Étienne | €13M purchase option for the 2020-21 season |
| Svetozar Marković | (Serbia) (Bosnia and Herzegovina) | CB | 23 March 2000 (20) | (Serbia) Partizan | |
| Yassine Meriah | (Tunisia) | CB | 2 July 1993 (27) | (Turkey) Rizespor | |
| Giannis Masouras | (Greece) | RB | 24 August 1996 (24) | (Poland) Górnik Zabrze | |
| Nemanja Nikolić | (Bosnia and Herzegovina) | RB | 21 February 2001 (19) | (Greece) Chania | |
| Fodé Camara | (Guinea) | LB | 17 April 1998 (22) | (Greece) Chania | |
| Leonardo Koutris | (Greece) (Brazil) | LB | 23 July 1995 (25) | (Germany) Fortuna Düsseldorf | On a two-year loan deal |
| Abdoulaye Keita | (Mali) | DM | 5 January 1994 (26) | (France) Ajaccio | |
| Pêpê | (Portugal) | DM/CM | 20 May 1997 (23) | (Portugal) Famalicão | |
| Giorgos Xenitidis | (Greece) | CM | 24 August 1996 (24) | (Luxembourg) Jeunesse Esch | |
| Ioannis Kosti | (Cyprus) | CM | 17 March 2000 (20) | (Greece) Levadiakos | |
| Nikola Čumić | (Serbia) | RW | 20 November 1998 (21) | (Spain) Sporting Gijón | |
| Alexandros Nikolias | (Greece) | LW/RW | 23 July 1994 (26) | (Greece) AEL | On a two plus one-year loan deal |
| Maximiliano Lovera | (Argentina) | LW/RW/AM | 9 March 1999 (21) | (Argentina) Racing Club | €5M purchase option for the 2020-21 season |
| Fiorin Durmishaj | (Greece) (Albania) | FW | 14 November 1996 (23) | (Greece) AEL | |
| Franco Soldano | (Argentina) | FW | 4 September 1999 (21) | (Argentina) Boca Juniors | |

== Backroom staff ==
=== Coaching staff ===
| Position | Staff |
|---|---|
| Sport director | (France) Christian Karembeu |
| Technical director | (Greece) Vasilis Torosidis |
| Head coach | (Portugal) Pedro Martins |
| Assistant coaches | (Portugal) Antonio Henriques |
| Assistant coaches | (Portugal) Rui Pedro Castro |
| Analysts | (Portugal) Luís Antero Lobo |
| Analysts | (Greece) Giannis Vogiatzakis |
| Analysts | (Greece) Iosif Loukas |
| Fitness coach | (Greece) Christos Mourikis |
| Goalkeepers' trainer | (Greece) Panagiotis Agriogiannis |
Medical team
| Head doctor | (Greece) Christos Theos |
| Physios | (Greece) Nikos Lykouresis |
| Physios | (Greece) Panagiotis Sivilias |
| Physios | (Greece) Sifis Kleidis |
| Physios | (Greece) Giorgos Zouridakis |
| Nutritionist | (Portugal) Hernani Araujo Gomes |
| Masseur | (Greece) Aristeidis Chelioudakis |
Scouts
| Chief scout | (France) François Modesto |
| Scout | (Greece) Simos Havos |
| Scout | (Argentina) Chori Domínguez |
| Scout | (Argentina) Alejandro De Bartolo |

== Transfers ==
=== In ===
| No. | Pos. | Nat. | Name | Age | EU | Moving from | Type | Transfer window | Ends | Transfer fee | Source |
|---|---|---|---|---|---|---|---|---|---|---|---|
| 17 | FW | (Greece) | Marios Vrousai | 22 | EU | (Netherlands) Willem II | End of loan | Summer | 2021 | | |
| | DF | (Brazil) | Igor Silva | 23 | Non-EU | (Croatia) Osijek | End of loan | Summer | 2022 | | |
| | MF | (Greece) | Giorgos Manthatis | 23 | EU | (Cyprus) Anorthosis | End of loan | Summer | 2021 | | |
| | DF | (Greece) | Stefanos Evangelou | 22 | EU | (Greece) Panionios | End of loan | Summer | 2021 | | |
| 23 | DF | (Greece) | Leonardo Koutris | 25 | EU | (Spain) Mallorca | End of loan | Summer | 2021 | | |
| | MF | (Serbia) | Nikola Čumić | 25 | EU | (Serbia) Radnički Niš | End of loan | Summer | 2022 | | |
| | DF | (Bosnia and Herzegovina) | Nemanja Nikolić | 19 | EU | (Serbia) Radnički Niš | End of loan | Summer | 2023 | | |
| | MF | (Cyprus) | Ioannis Kosti | 25 | EU | (Cyprus) Nea Salamina | End of loan | Summer | 2024 | | |
| | DF | (Greece) | Giannis Masouras | 25 | EU | (Greece) AEL | End of loan | Summer | 2023 | | |
| 14 | MF | (Greece) | Thanasis Androutsos | 23 | EU | (Greece) Atromitos | End of loan | Summer | 2021 | | |
| 20 | FW | (Belgium) | Hugo Cuypers | 25 | EU | (France) Ajaccio | End of loan | Summer | 2023 | | |
| | MF | (Mali) | Abdoulaye Keita | 25 | Non-EU | (France) Ajaccio | End of loan | Summer | 2023 | | |
| | DF | (Guinea) | Fodé Camara | 25 | Non-EU | (France) Gazélec Ajaccio | End of loan | Summer | 2023 | | |
| | FW | (Greece) | Fiorin Durmishaj | 23 | EU | (Greece) Aris | End of loan | Summer | 2022 | | |
| | FW | (Greece) | Dimitrios Manos | 25 | EU | (Greece) OFI | End of loan | Summer | 2021 | | |
| | FW | (Argentina) | Franco Soldano | 25 | EU | (Argentina) Boca Juniors | End of loan | Summer | 2023 | | |
| | DF | (Tunisia) | Yassine Meriah | 27 | Non-EU | (Turkey) Kasımpaşa | End of loan | Summer | 2022 | | |
| 31 | GK | (Iceland) | Ögmundur Kristinsson | 31 | EU | (Greece) AEL | Transfer | Summer | 2023 | €400k | |
| 13 | DF | (Brazil) | Rafinha | 35 | EU | (Brazil) Flamengo | Transfer | Summer | 2022 | Free | |
| 25 | DF | (Greece) | José Holebas | 36 | EU | (England) Watford | Transfer | Summer | 2021 | Free | |
| 99 | FW | (Egypt) | Ahmed Hassan | 27 | EU | (Portugal) Braga | Transfer | Summer | 2023 | €2M | |
| | MF | (Greece) | Alexandros Nikolias | 26 | EU | (Greece) PAS Giannina | Transfer | Summer | Undisclosed | €300k | |
| 10 | MF | (Portugal) | Pêpê | 23 | EU | (Portugal) Vitória Guimarães | Transfer | Summer | 2024 | €4M | |
| 6 | MF | (France) | Yann M'Vila | 30 | EU | (France) Saint-Étienne | Transfer | Summer | 2023 | Free | |
| 15 | DF | (Serbia) | Svetozar Marković | 20 | EU | (Greece) AEL | End of loan | Summer | 2024 | | |
| 21 | DF | (Tunisia) | Mohamed Dräger | 24 | EU | (Germany) SC Freiburg | Transfer | Summer | 2024 | €1M | |
| 8 | MF | (Portugal) | Tiago Silva | 27 | EU | (England) Nottingham Forest | Transfer | Summer | Undisclosed | Free | |
| 27 | MF | (Portugal) | Bruma | 25 | EU | (Netherlands) PSV Eindhoven | Loan | Summer | 2021 | Free | |
| 12 | DF | (Portugal) | Rúben Vinagre | 21 | EU | (England) Wolves | Loan | Summer | 2021 | Free | |
| 45 | DF | (Moldova) | Oleg Reabciuk | 22 | EU | (Portugal) Paços de Ferreira | Transfer | Winter | 2025 | €2.2M | |
| 15 | DF | (Greece) | Sokratis Papastathopoulos | 32 | EU | (England) Arsenal | Transfer | Winter | 2023 | Free | |
| 72 | DF | (France) | Kenny Lala | 29 | EU | (France) Strasbourg | Transfer | Winter | 2023 | €500k | |
| | MF | (Cyprus) | Ioannis Kosti | 20 | EU | (Greece) AEL | End of loan | Winter | 2024 | | |

▼ Total Spending: €10.40M

=== Out ===
| No. | Pos. | Nat. | Name | Age | EU | Moving to | Type | Transfer window | Transfer fee | Source |
|---|---|---|---|---|---|---|---|---|---|---|
| | MF | (Turkey) | Emre Mor | 23 | EU | (Spain) Celta Vigo | End of loan | Summer | | |
| | DF | (Brazil) | Igor Silva | 23 | Non-EU | (Croatia) Osijek | Transfer | Summer | €500k | |
| | MF | (Greece) | Lazaros Christodoulopoulos | 33 | EU | (Greece) Atromitos | Transfer | Summer | Free | |
| | DF | (Norway) | Omar Elabdellaoui | 28 | EU | (Turkey) Galatasaray | Transfer | Summer | Free | |
| | DF | (Greece) | Kostas Tsimikas | 24 | EU | (England) Liverpool | Transfer | Summer | €13M | |
| | FW | (Greece) | Dimitrios Manos | 25 | EU | (Greece) Aris | Transfer | Summer | Free | |
| | FW | (Argentina) | Franco Soldano | 25 | EU | (Argentina) Boca Juniors | Loan | Summer | €300k | |
| | FW | (Greece) | Fiorin Durmishaj | 23 | EU | (Greece) AEL | Loan | Summer | Free | |
| | DF | (Angola) | Bruno Gaspar | 27 | EU | (Portugal) Sporting CP | End of loan | Summer | | |
| | FW | (Egypt) | Ahmed Hassan | 27 | EU | (Portugal) Braga | End of loan | Summer | | |
| | MF | (Greece) | Giorgos Xenitidis | 20 | EU | (Luxembourg) Jeunesse Esch | Loan | Summer | Free | |
| | DF | (Greece) | Giannis Masouras | 24 | EU | (Poland) Górnik Zabrze | Loan | Summer | Free | |
| | MF | (Mali) | Abdoulaye Keita | 26 | Non-EU | (France) Ajaccio | Loan | Summer | Free | |
| | MF | (Brazil) | Guilherme | 29 | EU | (Qatar) Al Sadd | Transfer | Summer | €6M | |
| | FW | (Spain) | Miguel Ángel Guerrero | 30 | EU | (England) Nottingham Forest | Transfer | Summer | Free | |
| | DF | (Tunisia) | Yassine Meriah | 27 | Non-EU | (Turkey) Rizespor | Loan | Summer | Free | |
| | DF | (Greece) | Vasilis Torosidis | 35 | EU | | Retired | Summer | | |
| | DF | (Bosnia and Herzegovina) | Nemanja Nikolić | 19 | EU | (Greece) Chania | Loan | Summer | Free | |
| | DF | (Guinea) | Fodé Camara | 22 | Non-EU | (Greece) Chania | Loan | Summer | Free | |
| | MF | (Serbia) | Nikola Čumić | 21 | EU | (Spain) Sporting Gijón | Loan | Summer | Free | |
| | DF | (Greece) | Leonardo Koutris | 25 | EU | (Germany) Fortuna Düsseldorf | Loan | Summer | €1M | |
| | MF | (Greece) | Alexandros Nikolias | 26 | EU | (Greece) AEL | Loan | Summer | Free | |
| | GK | (Greece) | Marios Siampanis | 21 | EU | (Greece) Aris | Transfer | Summer | Free | |
| | DF | (Serbia) | Svetozar Marković | 20 | EU | (Serbia) Partizan | Loan | Summer | Free | |
| | MF | (Cyprus) | Ioannis Kosti | 20 | EU | (Greece) AEL | Loan | Summer | Free | |
| | MF | (Greece) | Giorgos Manthatis | 23 | EU | | Released | Summer | | |
| | DF | (Greece) | Stefanos Evangelou | 22 | EU | (Poland) Górnik Zabrze | Transfer | Summer | Free | |
| | MF | (Portugal) | Cafú | 27 | EU | (England) Nottingham Forest | Loan | Summer | Free | |
| | GK | (France) | Bobby Allain | 28 | EU | | Released | Summer | | |
| | DF | (Portugal) | Rúben Vinagre | 21 | EU | (England) Wolves | End of loan | Winter | | |
| | DF | (Senegal) | Pape Abou Cissé | 25 | Non-EU | (France) Saint-Étienne | Loan | Winter | €650k | |
| | MF | (Algeria) | Hillal Soudani | 33 | Non-EU | (Saudi Arabia) Al Fateh | Transfer | Winter | Free | |
| | MF | (Brazil) | Bruno | 26 | Non-EU | (Greece) Aris | Transfer | Winter | Free | |
| | MF | (Portugal) | Pêpê | 23 | EU | (Portugal) Famalicão | Loan | Winter | Free | |
| | DF | (Brazil) | Rafinha | 35 | EU | | Released | Winter | | |
| | MF | (Argentina) | Maximiliano Lovera | 21 | Non-EU | (Argentina) Racing Club | Loan | Winter | €500k | |
| | MF | (Cyprus) | Ioannis Kosti | 20 | EU | (Greece) Levadiakos | Loan | Winter | Free | |
| | MF | (Portugal) | Cafú | 27 | EU | (England) Nottingham Forest | Transfer | Winter | | |

▲ Total Income: €21.95M

Net Income: ▲€11.55M

== Friendlies ==
Win Draw Loss

| 24 August 2020 | Olympiacos | 1–0 | PAS Giannina | Agios Ioannis Rentis, Greece |
| 19:00 EEST | Hassan 87' | | | Stadium: Olympiacos training ground Attendance: 0 (closed doors) |

| 6 September 2020 | Atromitos | 1–0 | Olympiacos | Peristeri, Greece |
| 20:00 EEST | Salomon 29'; Risvanis (yellow card) 88' | | Ba (yellow card) 69' | Stadium: Peristeri Stadium; Attendance: 0 (closed doors); Referee: Andreas Gamaris |

| 6 October 2020 | Olympiacos | 2–0 | Chania | Piraeus, Greece |
| 17:45 EEST | Hassan 22'; Soudani 56' | | | Stadium: Karaiskakis Stadium; Attendance: 0 (closed doors) |

| 9 October 2020 | Olympiacos | 0–0 | Levadiakos | Agios Ioannis Rentis, Greece |
| 18:00 EEST | | | | Stadium: Olympiacos training ground Attendance: 0 (closed doors) |

| 13 November 2020 | Olympiacos | 2–5 | Atromitos | Agios Ioannis Rentis, Greece |
| 11:00 EEST | Valbuena 41' (pen.); Pêpê 58' | | Christodoulopoulos 8'; N'Sikulu 23'; Tomašević 42'; Manousos 74' | Stadium: Olympiacos training ground Attendance: 0 (closed doors) |

== Competitions ==
=== Overview ===
| Competition | First match | Last match | Starting round | Final position | Record | | | | | | | |
| Competition | First match | Last match | Starting round | Final position | Pld | W | D | L | GF | GA | GD | Win % |
|---|---|---|---|---|---|---|---|---|---|---|---|---|
| Super League Greece | 18 September 2020 | 16 May 2021 | Matchday 1 | Winners | 36 | 28 | 6 | 2 | 82 | 19 | +63 | 77.78 |
| Greek Football Cup | 20 January 2021 | 22 May 2021 | Sixth Round | Runners-up | 7 | 4 | 2 | 1 | 14 | 6 | +8 | 57.14 |
| UEFA Champions League | 23 September 2020 | 9 December 2020 | Play-off round | Group stage | 8 | 2 | 1 | 5 | 4 | 10 | −6 | 25.00 |
| UEFA Europa League | 18 February 2021 | 18 March 2021 | Round of 32 | Round of 16 | 4 | 2 | 0 | 2 | 7 | 7 | +0 | 50.00 |
| Total | | | | | 55 | 36 | 9 | 10 | 107 | 42 | +65 | 65.45 |

Last updated: 22 May 2021
Source: Competitions

=== Super League Greece ===
==== League table ====
| Pos | Team | Pld | W | D | L | GF | GA | GD | Pts | Qualification |
|---|---|---|---|---|---|---|---|---|---|---|
| 1 | Olympiacos | 26 | 21 | 4 | 1 | 64 | 13 | +51 | 67 | Qualification for the Play-off round |
| 2 | Aris | 26 | 15 | 6 | 5 | 34 | 16 | +18 | 51 | Qualification for the Play-off round |
| 3 | AEK Athens | 26 | 14 | 6 | 6 | 41 | 29 | +12 | 48 | Qualification for the Play-off round |
| 4 | PAOK | 26 | 13 | 8 | 5 | 49 | 26 | +23 | 47 | Qualification for the Play-off round |
| 5 | Panathinaikos | 26 | 13 | 6 | 7 | 30 | 19 | +11 | 45 | Qualification for the Play-off round |

Source: Super League Greece
Rules for classification: 1) Points; 2) Head-to-head points; 3) Head-to-head goal difference; 4) Goals scored; 5) Goals against.

==== Results summary ====
| Overall | | | | | | | | Home | | | | | | Away | | | | | |
| Pld | W | D | L | GF | GA | GD | Pts | W | D | L | GF | GA | GD | W | D | L | GF | GA | GD |
|---|---|---|---|---|---|---|---|---|---|---|---|---|---|---|---|---|---|---|---|
| 36 | 28 | 6 | 2 | 82 | 19 | +63 | 90 | 17 | 1 | 0 | 43 | 4 | +39 | 11 | 5 | 2 | 39 | 15 | +24 |

Last updated: 16 May 2021.
Source: Super League Greece

==== Results by matchday ====
| Matchday | 1 | 2 | 3 | 4 | 5 | 6 | 7 | 8 | 9 | 10 | 11 | 12 | 13 | 14 | 15 | 16 | 17 | 18 | 19 | 20 | 21 | 22 | 23 | 24 | 25 | 26 |
|---|---|---|---|---|---|---|---|---|---|---|---|---|---|---|---|---|---|---|---|---|---|---|---|---|---|---|
| Ground | A | H | H | A | H | A | H | A | H | A | H | A | H | H | A | A | H | A | H | A | H | A | H | A | H | A |
| Result | D | W | W | D | W | D | W | W | W | W | W | W | W | W | W | W | W | W | W | W | W | L | D | W | W | W |
| Position | 8 | 4 | 2 | 3 | 2 | 3 | 2 | 1 | 1 | 1 | 1 | 1 | 1 | 1 | 1 | 1 | 1 | 1 | 1 | 1 | 1 | 1 | 1 | 1 | 1 | 1 |

Updated to match(es) played on 14 March 2021. Source: Super League Greece
A = Away; H = Home; W = Win; D = Draw; L = Loss

| Championship round matchday | 1 | 2 | 3 | 4 | 5 | 6 | 7 | 8 | 9 | 10 |
|---|---|---|---|---|---|---|---|---|---|---|
| Ground | H | A | H | A | H | A | H | A | H | A |
| Result | W | W | W | L | W | W | D | D | W | W |
| Position | 1 | 1 | 1 | 1 | 1 | 1 | 1 | 1 | 1 | 1 |

Updated to match(es) played on 16 May 2021. Source: Super League Greece
A = Away; H = Home; W = Win; D = Draw; L = Loss

==== Regular season matches ====
Win Draw Loss

| 16 December 2020 1 | AEK | 1–1 | Olympiacos | Athens |
| 19:30 EEST | Simões (yellow card) 35', (goal) 80'; Krstičić (yellow card) 64' | Report | Vrousai 55' | Stadium: Olympic Stadium; Attendance: 0 (closed doors); Referee: Andris Treimanis (Latvia) |

| 18 September 2020 2 | Olympiacos | 3–0 | Asteras Tripolis | Piraeus |
| 20:30 EEST | Fortounis 59'; Masouras 64', 88' | Report | Munafo (yellow card) 50'; Valiente (yellow card) 85' | Stadium: Karaiskakis Stadium; Attendance: 0 (closed doors); Referee: Menios Koutsiaftis |

| 26 September 2020 3 | Olympiacos | 2–0 | Panetolikos | Piraeus |
| 20:30 EEST | Cissé (yellow card) 32'; El-Arabi 48'; Cafú 86' | Report | Mazzola (yellow card) 26' | Stadium: Karaiskakis Stadium; Attendance: 0 (closed doors); Referee: Anastasios Sidiropoulos |

| 4 October 2020 4 | PAS Giannina | 1–1 | Olympiacos | Ioannina |
| 20:30 EEST | Pamlidis 6'; Erramuspe (yellow card) 42'; Križman (yellow card) 72' | Report | Camara (yellow card) 22'; El-Arabi 51'; Ba (yellow card) 88' | Stadium: Zosimades Stadium; Attendance: 0 (closed doors); Referee: Dimitris Karantonis |

| 17 October 2020 5 | Olympiacos | 4–0 | Atromitos | Piraeus |
| 20:30 EEST | Holebas (yellow card) 24'; Ba (yellow card) 45'; El-Arabi 52', 82', 87'; Hassan 65'; Semedo (yellow card) 77' | Report | Matić (red card) 30' | Stadium: Karaiskakis Stadium; Attendance: 0 (closed doors); Referee: Menios Koutsiaftis |

| 13 January 2021 6 | PAOK | 1–1 | Olympiacos | Thessaloniki |
| 19:30 EET | Krmenčík (yellow card) 20'; Paschalakis (yellow card) 35'; Ingason 51', (yellow card) 61' | Report | Rafinha (yellow card) 68'; Ba 77' | Stadium: Toumba Stadium; Attendance: 0 (closed doors); Referee: Michael Fabbri (Italy) |

| 31 October 2020 7 | Olympiacos | 2–0 | Apollon Smyrnis | Piraeus |
| 15:00 EET | Papadopoulos (yellow card) 56'; Hassan 65', 72' | Report | Vitlis (yellow card) 33'; Fernández (yellow card) 85' | Stadium: Karaiskakis Stadium; Attendance: 0 (closed doors); Referee: Anastasios Papapetrou |

| 8 November 2020 8 | OFI | 0–2 | Olympiacos | Heraklion |
| 15:00 EET | Selimović (yellow card) 21'; Sakor (yellow card) 40'; Mellado (yellow card) 75' | Report | Camara (yellow card) 17'; Semedo (yellow card) 44'; Hassan 53'; Pêpê (yellow card) 79'; Masouras 80' | Stadium: Theodoros Vardinogiannis Stadium; Attendance: 0 (closed doors); Referee: Giannis Papadopoulos |

| 21 November 2020 9 | Olympiacos | 1–0 | Panathinaikos | Piraeus |
| 19:30 EET | Fortounis 21'; M'Vila (yellow card) 35'; Rafinha (yellow card) 79'; Bouchalakis (yellow card) 88' | Report | Juankar (yellow card) 41'; Sánchez (yellow card) 57'; Villafáñez (yellow card) 84' | Stadium: Karaiskakis Stadium; Attendance: 0 (closed doors); Referee: Artur Soares Dias (Portugal) |

| 28 November 2020 10 | Aris | 1–2 | Olympiacos | Thessaloniki |
| 19:30 EET | Bertoglio 74' | Report | Bouchalakis 21', 47'; Semedo (yellow card) 40'; Cissé (yellow card) 60'; Fortounis (yellow card) 83' | Stadium: Kleanthis Vikelidis Stadium; Attendance: 0 (closed doors); Referee: Ivan Bebek (Croatia) |

| 5 December 2020 11 | Olympiacos | 4–1 | Volos | Piraeus |
| 19:30 EET | Ba (yellow card) 42'; Masouras 45'; El-Arabi 66', 80', 90' | Report | Barrientos 11' (pen.); Sánchez (yellow card) 32' | Stadium: Karaiskakis Stadium; Attendance: 0 (closed doors); Referee: Giannis Papadopoulos |

| 13 December 2020 12 | Lamia | 0–6 | Olympiacos | Lamia |
| 15:00 EET | Tzanetopoulos (yellow card) 37'; Saramantas (yellow card) 73' (yellow-red card) 81' | Report | Bouchalakis 13'; M'Vila (yellow card) 28', (goal) 34'; El-Arabi 35'; Soudani 82' (pen.); Cuypers 83'; Masouras 87' | Stadium: Athanasios Diakos Stadium; Attendance: 0 (closed doors); Referee: Aristidis Vatsios |

| 20 December 2020 13 | Olympiacos | 5–1 | AEL | Piraeus |
| 15:00 EET | Soudani 25'; El-Arabi 40', 88'; Masouras 65'; Bruma 79' | Report | Pinakas 33'; Platellas (yellow card) 66' | Stadium: Karaiskakis Stadium; Attendance: 0 (closed doors); Referee: Anastasios Papapetrou |

| 3 January 2021 14 | Olympiacos | 3–0 | AEK | Piraeus |
| 19:30 EET | El-Arabi 13', 68'; Bruma (yellow card) 60'; Ba (yellow card) 81'; Semedo (yellow card) 86'; Valbuena 90' (pen.) | Report | Chyhrynskyi (yellow card) 45'; Mantalos (yellow card) 52' | Stadium: Karaiskakis Stadium; Attendance: 0 (closed doors); Referee: Danny Makkelie (Netherlands) |

| 6 January 2021 15 | Asteras Tripolis | 0–4 | Olympiacos | Tripoli |
| 19:30 EET | Valiente (yellow card) 21'; Papadopoulos (yellow card) 23' | Report | Semedo (yellow card) 21', (goal) 35'; Camara 40'; Ba (yellow card) 54'; Fortounis 81'; Bruma 86' | Stadium: Theodoros Kolokotronis Stadium; Attendance: 0 (closed doors); Referee: Stathis Gortsilas |

| 9 January 2021 16 | Panetolikos | 1–2 | Olympiacos | Agrinio |
| 19:30 EET | Azadi (yellow card) 15'; Tahar 48'; Konstantopoulos (yellow card) 80' | Report | Fortounis 4'; Bruma (yellow card) 43'; El-Arabi 65' | Stadium: Panetolikos Stadium; Attendance: 0 (closed doors); Referee: Dimitris Karantonis |

| 17 January 2021 17 | Olympiacos | 1–0 | PAS Giannina | Piraeus |
| 15:00 EET | Reabciuk (yellow card) 82'; Hassan 90' | Report | Choutesiotis (yellow card) 19'; Erramuspe (yellow card) 40'; Peersman (yellow card) 57'; Saliakas (yellow card) 80'; Athanasiou (yellow card) 90' | Stadium: Karaiskakis Stadium; Attendance: 0 (closed doors); Referee: Aristotelis Diamantopoulos |

| 24 January 2021 18 | Atromitos | 0–1 | Olympiacos | Peristeri |
| 15:00 EET | Umbides (yellow card) 69' | Report | Bouchalakis (yellow card) 39'; Bruma 45'; Semedo (yellow card) 56'; Ba (yellow card) 60'; Reabciuk (yellow card) 90' | Stadium: Peristeri Stadium; Attendance: 0 (closed doors); Referee: Petros Tsagarakis |

| 27 January 2021 19 | Olympiacos | 3–0 | PAOK | Piraeus |
| 19:30 EET | El-Arabi 50'; Camara 77'; Vrousai 89' | Report | | Stadium: Karaiskakis Stadium; Attendance: 0 (closed doors); Referee: Felix Brych (Germany) |

| 31 January 2021 20 | Apollon Smyrnis | 1–3 | Olympiacos | Athens |
| 19:30 EET | Thomás (yellow card) 43'; Tsabouris (yellow card) 56'; Dauda 90'; Karagounis (yellow card) 90' | Report | Camara (yellow card) 5'; Hassan 31', 90'; Androutsos (yellow card) 55'; M'Vila 72' | Stadium: Georgios Kamaras Stadium; Attendance: 0 (closed doors); Referee: Anastasios Sidiropoulos |

| 7 February 2021 21 | Olympiacos | 3–0 | OFI | Piraeus |
| 17:15 EET | M'Vila 19'; Androutsos (yellow card) 24'; Masouras 37', (yellow card) 53'; Reabciuk (yellow card) 50'; El-Arabi 68' | Report | Weiss (yellow card) 13'; Selimović (yellow card) 79' | Stadium: Karaiskakis Stadium; Attendance: 0 (closed doors); Referee: Stathis Gortsilas |

| 14 February 2021 22 | Panathinaikos | 2–1 | Olympiacos | Athens |
| 19:30 EET | Maurício 6'; Ioannidis (yellow card) 32'; Alexandropoulos (yellow card) 52'; Sankharé 73'; Dioudis (yellow card) 84' | Report | Camara (yellow card) 22'; Ba (yellow card) 76' (yellow-red card) 90'; El-Arabi 82' | Stadium: Leoforos Alexandras Stadium; Attendance: 0 (closed doors); Referee: Bobby Madden (Scotland) |

| 21 February 2021 23 | Olympiacos | 1–1 | Aris | Piraeus |
| 19:30 EET | Fortounis 40', (yellow card) 43'; Camara (yellow card) 51'; Semedo (yellow card) 79'; Sá (yellow card) 80'; Ranđelović (yellow card) 90' | Report | Jeggo (yellow card) 45'; Silva (yellow card) 56'; Mitroglou 80' (pen.), (yellow card) 85' | Stadium: Karaiskakis Stadium; Attendance: 0 (closed doors); Referee: Anastasios Sidiropoulos |

| 1 March 2021 24 | Volos | 1–2 | Olympiacos | Volos |
| 19:30 EET | Grillo 10'; Ninis (yellow card) 32'; Barrientos (yellow card) 54'; Mitoglou (yellow card) 58'; Ferrari (yellow card) 85' | Report | Fortounis 4'; Camara (yellow card) 16'; M'Vila (yellow card) 20', (goal) 83' | Stadium: Panthessaliko Stadium; Attendance: 0 (closed doors); Referee: Fábio Veríssimo (Portugal) |

| 7 March 2021 25 | Olympiacos | 3–0 | Lamia | Piraeus |
| 15:00 EET | Bruma 8', (yellow card) 74'; Fortounis 10'; El-Arabi 33' | Report | Vasilakakis (yellow card) 90' | Stadium: Karaiskakis Stadium; Attendance: 0 (closed doors); Referee: Dimitris Karantonis |

| 14 March 2021 26 | AEL | 1–3 | Olympiacos | Larissa |
| 19:00 EET | Jusino (yellow card) 32'; Jakimovski (yellow card) 51'; Nunić 88'; Chalatsis (yellow card) 90' | Report | Hassan 33' (pen.); Ranđelović (yellow card) 44'; Androutsos 55'; Masouras (yellow card) 58'; Papastathopoulos (yellow card) 78'; El-Arabi 80' | Stadium: AEL FC Arena; Attendance: 0 (closed doors); Referee: Giorgos Tzovaras |

==== Play-off round matches ====
| 21 March 2021 1 | Olympiacos | 1–0 | Aris | Piraeus |
| 17:15 EET | Masouras 38'; Lala (red card) 41'; Bouchalakis (yellow card) 50'; Sá (yellow card) 90' | Report | Gama (yellow card) 15' | Stadium: Karaiskakis Stadium; Attendance: 0 (closed doors); Referee: Jakob Kehle (Denmark) |

| 4 April 2021 2 | AEK | 1–5 | Olympiacos | Athens |
| 19:30 EEST | Oliveira (yellow card) 45'; Ansarifard 90' | Report | Camara 17'; Masouras 23', 44'; El-Arabi 35'; Bruma (yellow card) 39'; Fortounis 74' | Stadium: Olympic Stadium; Attendance: 0 (closed doors); Referee: Srđan Jovanović (Serbia) |

| 11 April 2021 3 | Olympiacos | 3–1 | Panathinaikos | Piraeus |
| 19:30 EEST | Semedo (yellow card) 29'; Bouchalakis (yellow card) 45'; Hassan 45', 72'; El-Arabi (yellow card) 45'; Masouras (yellow card) 79'; Bruma 90' | Report | Macheda 31' (pen.); Chatzigiovanis (yellow card) 43'; Maurício (yellow card) 45'; Poungouras (yellow card) 45' (yellow-red card) 66' | Stadium: Karaiskakis Stadium; Attendance: 0 (closed doors); Referee: Ivan Bebek (Croatia) |

| 18 April 2021 4 | PAOK | 2–0 | Olympiacos | Thessaloniki |
| 19:30 EEST | Živković 49', 63' | Report | Papadopoulos (yellow card) 39'; Reabciuk (yellow card) 69' | Stadium: Toumba Stadium; Attendance: 0 (closed doors); Referee: Aleksandar Stavrev (North Macedonia) |

| 21 April 2021 5 | Olympiacos | 1–0 | Asteras Tripolis | Piraeus |
| 17:15 EEST | Papastathopoulos 52'; Dräger (yellow card) 66' | Report | Barrales (yellow card) 34' | Stadium: Karaiskakis Stadium; Attendance: 0 (closed doors); Referee: Anastasios Sidiropoulos |

| 25 April 2021 6 | Olympiacos | 2–0 | AEK | Piraeus |
| 19:30 EEST | Semedo (yellow card) 42'; Tiago Silva (yellow card) 44'; Bruma 50', 90'; Papastathopoulos (yellow card) 72'; Reabciuk (yellow card) 86' | Report | Nedelcearu (yellow card) 72' | Stadium: Karaiskakis Stadium; Attendance: 0 (closed doors); Referee: Nikola Dabanović (Montenegro) |

| 5 May 2021 7 | Aris | 1–1 | Olympiacos | Thessaloniki |
| 17:15 EEST | Manos 14'; Benalouane (yellow card) 72' | Report | Ranđelović (yellow card) 51'; Fortounis 82' | Stadium: Kleanthis Vikelidis Stadium; Attendance: 0 (closed doors); Referee: Roi Reinshreiber (Israel) |

| 9 May 2021 8 | Asteras Tripolis | 0–0 | Olympiacos | Tripoli |
| 17:15 EEST | | Report | Androutsos (yellow card) 52'; Kalogeropoulos (yellow card) 59' | Stadium: Theodoros Kolokotronis Stadium; Attendance: 0 (closed doors); Referee: Menios Koutsiaftis |

| 12 May 2021 9 | Olympiacos | 1–0 | PAOK | Piraeus |
| 19:30 EET | Masouras 32'; Valbuena (yellow card) 83' | Report | Warda (yellow card) 7' | Stadium: Karaiskakis Stadium; Attendance: 0 (closed doors); Referee: Vasilis Fotias |

| 16 May 2021 10 | Panathinaikos | 1–4 | Olympiacos | Athens |
| 19:30 EET | Sánchez (yellow card) 30'; Mollo (yellow card) 50'; Maurício 53'; Villafáñez (yellow card) 59' (yellow-red card) 90' | Report | Masouras 7', 12'; Sá (yellow card) 16'; El-Arabi 38', 72'; Reabciuk (yellow card) 41'; Kalogeropoulos (yellow card) 80'; Bouchalakis (yellow card) 83' | Stadium: Leoforos Alexandras Stadium; Attendance: 0 (closed doors); Referee: Andreas Ekberg (Sweden) |

=== Greek Football Cup ===
Win Draw Loss

==== Sixth round ====
| 20 January 2021 First leg | Panetolikos | 0–3 | Olympiacos | Agrinio |
| 19:30 EET | | | Bruma 20'; Papadopoulos (yellow card) 41'; Vrousai 65'; Cissé 85' | Stadium: Panetolikos Stadium; Attendance: 0 (closed doors); Referee: Konstantinos Tsetsilas |

| 3 February 2021 Second leg | Olympiacos | 3–0 (6–0 agg.) | Panetolikos | Piraeus |
| 17:15 EET | Masouras 9'; Tiago Silva (yellow card) 21'; Cuypers 30'; Holebas (yellow card) 45'; Androutsos 81' | | Mazurek (yellow card) 51'; Arzura (yellow card) 90' | Stadium: Karaiskakis Stadium; Attendance: 0 (closed doors); Referee: Vangelis Gratsanis |

==== Quarter-finals ====
| 10 February 2021 First leg | Olympiacos | 2–1 | Aris | Piraeus |
| 21:30 EET | Hassan 1', 14'; Cuypers (yellow card) 37'; Ba (yellow card) 68'; Ranđelović (yellow card) 89' | | Ba 4' (o.g.); Benalouane (yellow card) 81'; Jeggo (yellow card) 90' | Stadium: Karaiskakis Stadium; Attendance: 0 (closed doors); Referee: Dimitris Karantonis |

| 3 March 2021 Second leg | Aris | 1–1 (2–3 agg.) | Olympiacos | Thessaloniki |
| 20:00 EET | Gama 54' (pen.); Jeggo (yellow card) 71'; Sundgren (yellow card) 90' | | Tiago Silva (yellow card) 62'; Bouchalakis 87'; Kristinsson (yellow card) 89'; El-Arabi (yellow card) 90' | Stadium: Kleanthis Vikelidis Stadium; Attendance: 0 (closed doors); Referee: Mattias Gestranius (Finland) |

==== Semi-finals ====
The draw for the semi-finals was held on 16 March 2021.

| 7 April 2021 First leg | PAS Giannina | 1–1 | Olympiacos | Ioannina |
| 18:00 EEST | Pantelakis (yellow card) 12'; Erramuspe (yellow card) 14', (goal) 45' (pen.); Fabry (yellow card) 44'; Peersman (yellow card) 45' | | Reabciuk (yellow card) 21'; Ba (yellow card) 45'; Hassan 73' | Stadium: Zosimades Stadium; Attendance: 0 (closed doors); Referee: Andris Treimanis (Latvia) |

| 28 April 2021 Second leg | Olympiacos | 3–1 (4–2 agg.) | PAS Giannina | Piraeus |
| 19:00 EEST | El-Arabi 26' (pen.), 41'; Androutsos (yellow card) 43'; Holebas (yellow card) 52' (yellow-red card) 90'; Bruma 56'; Semedo (yellow card) 86' | | Peersman (yellow card) 25'; Kartalis 51'; Pantelakis (yellow card) 90' | Stadium: Karaiskakis Stadium; Attendance: 0 (closed doors); Referee: Paweł Raczkowski (Poland) |

==== Final ====
| 22 May 2021 Final | Olympiacos | 1–2 | PAOK | Athens |
| 21:00 EEST | M'Vila 50' | | Vieirinha 36' (pen.); Augusto (yellow card) 45'; Krmenčík 90'; Schwab (yellow card) 90' | Stadium: Olympic Stadium; Attendance: 0 (closed doors); Referee: Danny Makkelie (Netherlands) |

=== UEFA Champions League ===
Win Draw Loss

==== Play-off round ====
| 23 September 2020 First leg | Olympiacos (Greece) | 2–0 | (Cyprus) Omonia | Piraeus, Greece |
| 22:00 EEST | Semedo (yellow card) 48'; Valbuena 69' (pen.); El-Arabi 90' | Report | Vítor Gomes (yellow card) 26'; Lüftner (yellow card) 42'; Bauthéac (yellow card) 44'; Lecjaks (yellow card) 69' | Stadium: Karaiskakis Stadium; Attendance: 0 (closed doors); Referee: Danny Makkelie (Netherlands) |

| 29 September 2020 Second leg | Omonia (Cyprus) | 0–0 (0–2 agg.) | (Greece) Olympiacos | Nicosia, Cyprus |
| 22:00 EEST | Bauthéac (yellow card) 66'; Kousoulos (yellow card) 76'; Hubočan (yellow card) 80' | Report | Ba (yellow card) 46'; Holebas (yellow card) 56'; Rafinha (yellow card) 85'; Bouchalakis (yellow card) 89' | Stadium: New GSP Stadium; Attendance: 0 (closed doors); Referee: Antonio Mateu Lahoz (Spain) |

==== Group stage ====
The group stage draw was held on 1 October 2020.

| Pos | Team | Pld | W | D | L | GF | GA | GD | Pts | Qualification | MCI | POR | OLY | MAR |
|---|---|---|---|---|---|---|---|---|---|---|---|---|---|---|
| 1 | (England) Manchester City | 6 | 5 | 1 | 0 | 13 | 1 | +12 | 16 | Advance to knockout phase | — | 3–1 | 3–0 | 3–0 |
| 2 | (Portugal) Porto | 6 | 4 | 1 | 1 | 10 | 3 | +7 | 13 | Advance to knockout phase | 0–0 | — | 2–0 | 3–0 |
| 3 | (Greece) Olympiacos | 6 | 1 | 0 | 5 | 2 | 10 | −8 | 3 (Note: Tied on head-to-head points (3). Head-to-head away goals: Olympiacos 1, Marseille 0.) | Transfer to Europa League | 0–1 | 0–2 | — | 1–0 |
| 4 | (France) Marseille | 6 | 1 | 0 | 5 | 2 | 13 | −11 | 3 | | 0–3 | 0–2 | 2–1 | — |

Source: UEFA
Rules for classification: Group stage tiebreakers
Notes:

| 21 October 2020 1 | Olympiacos (Greece) | 1–0 | (France) Marseille | Piraeus, Greece |
| 22:00 EEST | Hassan 90', (yellow card) 90' | Report | | Stadium: Karaiskakis Stadium; Attendance: 0 (closed doors); Referee: Daniele Orsato (Italy) |

| 27 October 2020 2 | Porto (Portugal) | 2–0 | (Greece) Olympiacos | Porto, Portugal |
| 22:00 EET | Fábio Vieira 11'; Corona (yellow card) 61'; Uribe (yellow card) 82'; Oliveira 85'; Manafá (yellow card) 90' | Report | Fortounis (yellow card) 80' | Stadium: Estádio do Dragão; Attendance: 2,450; Referee: Daniel Siebert (Germany) |

| 3 November 2020 3 | Manchester City (England) | 3–0 | (Greece) Olympiacos | Manchester, England |
| 22:00 EET | Torres 12'; Jesus 81'; Cancelo 90' | Report | Camara (yellow card) 55' | Stadium: City of Manchester Stadium; Attendance: 0 (closed doors); Referee: Carlos del Cerro Grande (Spain) |

| 25 November 2020 4 | Olympiacos (Greece) | 0–1 | (England) Manchester City | Piraeus, Greece |
| 19:55 EET | Rafinha (yellow card) 39' | Report | Foden 36'; Sterling (yellow card) 39'; Dias (yellow card) 54'; Gündoğan (yellow card) 86' | Stadium: Karaiskakis Stadium; Attendance: 0 (closed doors); Referee: Davide Massa (Italy) |

| 1 December 2020 5 | Marseille (France) | 2–1 | (Greece) Olympiacos | Marseille, France |
| 22:00 EET | Payet; Sakai (yellow card) 89' | Report | Camara 33', (yellow card) 62'; Holebas (yellow card) 59'; Rafinha (yellow card) 73' | Stadium: Stade Vélodrome; Attendance: 0 (closed doors); Referee: Jesús Gil Manzano (Spain) |

| 9 December 2020 6 | Olympiacos (Greece) | 0–2 | (Portugal) Porto | Piraeus, Greece |
| 22:00 EET | Fortounis (yellow card) 43'; Semedo (yellow card) 52' (yellow-red card) 79'; Rafinha (yellow card) 70' | Report | Otávio 10' (pen.); Nanu (yellow card) 27'; Luis Díaz (yellow card) 27'; Uribe 77' | Stadium: Karaiskakis Stadium; Attendance: 0 (closed doors); Referee: Felix Brych (Germany) |

=== UEFA Europa League ===
Win Draw Loss

==== Knockout phase ====
===== Round of 32 =====
The round of 32 draw was held on 14 December 2020.

| 18 February 2021 First leg | Olympiacos (Greece) | 4–2 | (Netherlands) PSV Eindhoven | Piraeus, Greece |
| 19:15 EET | Bouchalakis 9'; M'Vila 37'; El-Arabi 45'; Reabciuk (yellow card) 57'; Ba (yellow card) 63'; Bruma (yellow card) 63'; Masouras 83' | Report | Zahavi 14', 40'; Sangaré (yellow card) 32'; Rosario (yellow card) 63' | Stadium: Karaiskakis Stadium; Attendance: 0 (closed doors); Referee: Andreas Ekberg (Sweden) |

| 25 February 2021 Second leg | PSV Eindhoven (Netherlands) | 2–1 (4–5 agg.) | (Greece) Olympiacos | Eindhoven, Netherlands |
| 22:00 EET | Max (yellow card) 3'; Zahavi 23', 44'; Malen (yellow card) 84' | Report | Masouras (yellow card) 51'; Lala (yellow card) 79'; Hassan 88' | Stadium: Philips Stadion; Attendance: 0 (closed doors); Referee: Clément Turpin (France) |

===== Round of 16 =====
The round of 16 draw was held on 26 February 2021.

| 11 March 2021 First leg | Olympiacos (Greece) | 1–3 | (England) Arsenal | Piraeus, Greece |
| 22:00 EET | M'Vila (yellow card) 22'; Bouchalakis (yellow card) 37'; El-Arabi 58' | Report | Ødegaard 34'; Gabriel (yellow card) 43', (goal) 80'; Elneny 85' | Stadium: Karaiskakis Stadium; Attendance: 0 (closed doors); Referee: Daniel Siebert (Germany) |

| 18 March 2021 Second leg | Arsenal (England) | 0–1 (3–2 agg.) | (Greece) Olympiacos | London, England |
| 19:55 EET | Xhaka (yellow card) 86'; Tierney (yellow card) 90' | Report | Androutsos (yellow card) 35'; El-Arabi 51'; M'Vila (yellow card) 73'; Ba (yellow card) 82' (yellow-red card) 82' | Stadium: Emirates Stadium; Attendance: 0 (closed doors); Referee: Carlos del Cerro Grande (Spain) |

== Squad statistics ==
=== Appearances ===
As of match played 22 May 2021

| No. | Pos. | Nat. | Name | Greek Super League | Greek Cup | UEFA Champions League | UEFA Europa League | Total |
| No. | Pos. | Nat. | Name | Apps | Apps | Apps | Apps | Apps |
|---|---|---|---|---|---|---|---|---|
| 6 | MF | (France) | Yann M'Vila | 28(5) | 3(2) | 7(1) | 4 | 42(8) |
| 5 | MF | (Greece) | Andreas Bouchalakis | 23(7) | 5(2) | 7(1) | 3(1) | 38(11) |
| 11 | FW | (Morocco) | Youssef El-Arabi | 24(9) | 2(3) | 6(1) | 4 | 36(13) |
| 19 | MF | (Greece) | Georgios Masouras | 19(12) | 4(2) | 5(3) | 2(2) | 30(19) |
| 4 | MF | (Guinea) | Mady Camara | 24(7) | 3(2) | 6 | 4 | 37(9) |
| 7 | MF | (Greece) | Kostas Fortounis | 18(13) | 1(3) | 3(4) | 1(3) | 23(23) |
| 1 | GK | (Portugal) | José Sá | 29 | 3 | 8 | 4 | 44 |
| 3 | DF | (Portugal) | Rúben Semedo | 29(1) | 3(2) | 8 | 1 | 41(3) |
| 9 | FW | (Egypt) | Ahmed Hassan | 11(14) | 5(2) | 1(3) | 0(3) | 17(22) |
| 21 | DF | (Greece) | José Holebas | 20(2) | 6(1) | 7 | 1(1) | 34(4) |
| 28 | MF | (France) | Mathieu Valbuena | 13(13) | 0(3) | 5 | 3 | 21(16) |
| 97 | MF | (Serbia) | Lazar Ranđelović | 8(15) | 3(1) | 4(2) | 0(2) | 15(20) |
| 27 | MF | (Portugal) | Bruma | 18(4) | 4(1) | 0(2) | 3(1) | 25(8) |
| 24 | DF | (Senegal) | Ousseynou Ba | 18(1) | 4 | 4(1) | 3 | 29(2) |
| 14 | MF | (Greece) | Thanasis Androutsos | 13(6) | 4(2) | 0 | 1(3) | 18(11) |
| 45 | DF | (Moldova) | Oleg Reabciuk | 17(3) | 2(1) | 0 | 4 | 23(4) |
| 15 | DF | (Greece) | Sokratis Papastathopoulos | 11(3) | 5 | 0 | 3(1) | 19(4) |
| 13 | DF | (Brazil) | Rafinha | 13(1) | 0 | 8 | 0 | 21(1) |
| 17 | MF | (Greece) | Marios Vrousai | 10(4) | 2(1) | 2(1) | 0(1) | 14(7) |
| 8 | MF | (Portugal) | Tiago Silva | 7(9) | 4(1) | 0 | 0 | 11(10) |
| 66 | DF | (Senegal) | Pape Abou Cissé | 9(3) | 1 | 5(1) | 0 | 15(4) |
| 20 | FW | (Belgium) | Hugo Cuypers | 4(6) | 3(1) | 0 | 0 | 7(7) |
| 10 | MF | (Portugal) | Pêpê | 1(8) | 1 | 1(2) | 0 | 3(10) |
| 72 | DF | (France) | Kenny Lala | 4(1) | 2 | 0 | 3(1) | 9(2) |
| 21 | DF | (Tunisia) | Mohamed Dräger | 6(2) | 1 | 1 | 0 | 8(2) |
| 2 | MF | (Algeria) | Hillal Soudani | 1(4) | 0(1) | 0(4) | 0 | 1(9) |
| 34 | DF | (Greece) | Avraam Papadopoulos | 3(2) | 2 | 0 | 0 | 5(2) |
| 88 | GK | (Greece) | Konstantinos Tzolakis | 5 | 1 | 0 | 0 | 6 |
| 31 | GK | (Iceland) | Ögmundur Kristinsson | 2 | 3 | 0 | 0 | 5 |
| 22 | MF | (Argentina) | Maximiliano Lovera | 2(2) | 0(1) | 0 | 0 | 2(3) |
| 90 | MF | (Greece) | Vasilis Sourlis | 2(1) | 0(1) | 0 | 0 | 2(2) |
| 12 | DF | (Portugal) | Rúben Vinagre | 2 | 0 | 0(2) | 0 | 2(2) |
| 61 | DF | (Greece) | Alexis Kalogeropoulos | 2(1) | 0 | 0 | 0 | 2(1) |
| 18 | MF | (Brazil) | Bruno | 1(2) | 0 | 0 | 0 | 1(2) |
| 8 | MF | (Portugal) | Cafú | 0(2) | 0 | 0(1) | 0 | 0(3) |
| 44 | GK | (Greece) | Ilias Karargyris | 0(1) | 0 | 0 | 0 | 0(1) |
| 60 | FW | (Greece) | Tasos Tselios | 0 | 0(1) | 0 | 0 | 0(1) |

=== Goalscorers ===
As of match played 22 May 2021

| No. | Pos. | Nat. | Name | Greek Super League | Greek Cup | UEFA Champions League | UEFA Europa League | Total |
| No. | Pos. | Nat. | Name | Goals | Goals | Goals | Goals | Goals |
|---|---|---|---|---|---|---|---|---|
| 11 | FW | (Morocco) | Youssef El-Arabi | 22 | 2 | 1 | 3 | 28 |
| 19 | MF | (Greece) | Georgios Masouras | 13 | 1 | 0 | 1 | 15 |
| 9 | FW | (Egypt) | Ahmed Hassan | 10 | 3 | 1 | 1 | 15 |
| 7 | MF | (Greece) | Kostas Fortounis | 9 | 0 | 0 | 0 | 9 |
| 27 | MF | (Portugal) | Bruma | 7 | 2 | 0 | 0 | 9 |
| 6 | MF | (France) | Yann M'Vila | 4 | 1 | 0 | 1 | 6 |
| 5 | MF | (Greece) | Andreas Bouchalakis | 3 | 1 | 0 | 1 | 5 |
| 4 | MF | (Guinea) | Mady Camara | 3 | 0 | 1 | 0 | 4 |
| 17 | MF | (Greece) | Marios Vrousai | 2 | 1 | 0 | 0 | 3 |
| 2 | MF | (Algeria) | Hillal Soudani | 2 | 0 | 0 | 0 | 2 |
| 28 | MF | (France) | Mathieu Valbuena | 1 | 0 | 1 | 0 | 2 |
| 14 | MF | (Greece) | Thanasis Androutsos | 1 | 1 | 0 | 0 | 2 |
| 20 | FW | (Belgium) | Hugo Cuypers | 1 | 1 | 0 | 0 | 2 |
| 24 | DF | (Senegal) | Ousseynou Ba | 1 | 0 | 0 | 0 | 1 |
| 8 | MF | (Portugal) | Cafú | 1 | 0 | 0 | 0 | 1 |
| 15 | DF | (Greece) | Sokratis Papastathopoulos | 1 | 0 | 0 | 0 | 1 |
| 3 | DF | (Portugal) | Rúben Semedo | 1 | 0 | 0 | 0 | 1 |
| 66 | DF | (Senegal) | Pape Abou Cissé | 0 | 1 | 0 | 0 | 1 |

Own Goals: 0

== Individual Awards ==
| Name | Pos. | Award |
| (Portugal) Pedro Martins | Manager | Super League Greece Manager of the Season |
| (Morocco) Youssef El-Arabi | Forward | Olympiacos Player of the Season; Super League Greece Player of the Season; Super League Greece Golden Boot; Super League Greece Best Foreign Player; Super League Greece Team of the Season; Super League Greece Player of the Month December 2021 |
| (Greece) Georgios Masouras | Winger | Super League Greece Greek Footballer of the Season; Super League Greece Player of the Month September 2020; Super League Greece Team of the Season |
| (Greece) Andreas Bouchalakis | Central Midfielder | Super League Greece Team of the Season |
| (France) Yann M'Vila | Defensive Midfielder | Super League Greece Team of the Season |
| (Portugal) Rúben Semedo | Centre-back | Super League Greece Team of the Season |
| (Greece) Kostas Fortounis | Attacking Midfielder | Super League Greece Player of the Month November 2020 |
| (Portugal) Bruma | Winger | Super League Greece Player of the Month April 2021 |
