= Ousseynou Ba =

Senegalese association footballer

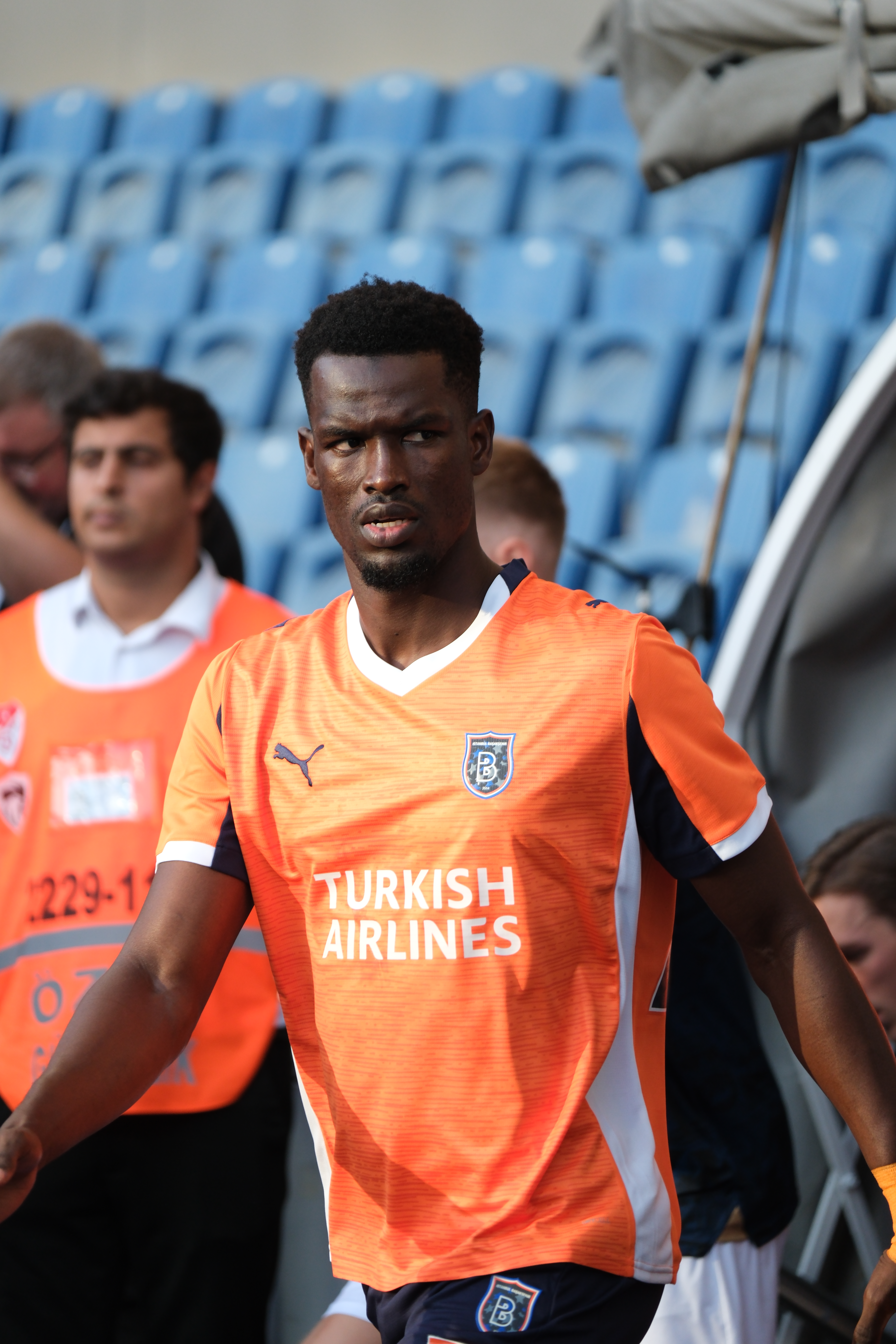
- Ba in 2025

Personal information
- Full name: Ousseynou Ba
- Date of birth: 11 November 1995 (age 31)
- Place of birth: Dakar, Senegal
- Height: 1.92 m (6 ft 3 1/2 in)
- Position: Centre-back

Team information
- Current team: İstanbul Başakşehir
- Number: 27

Youth career
- 2013–2016: SMASH Academy
- 2016–2017: Amiens

Senior career*
Years	Team	Apps	(Gls)
2017–2019	Gazélec Ajaccio	42	(1)
2019–2024	Olympiacos	78	(1)
2019	→ Gazélec Ajaccio (loan)	17	(0)
2023–2024	→ İstanbul Başakşehir (loan)	22	(0)
2024–	İstanbul Başakşehir	38	(0)

International career^{‡}
2020–2021	Senegal	2	(0)
- * Club domestic league appearances and goals as of 10 June 2026 ‡ National team caps and goals as of 26 March 2021

Ousseynou Ba (born 11 November 1995) is a Senegalese professional footballer who plays as a centre-back for İstanbul Başakşehir.

== Club career ==
Ba was a youth product from the Senegalese SMASH academy, before moving to Amiens in the summer of 2016. Unable to get a work permit for them, after a year of not playing Ba managed to get a work permit when he signed with Gazélec Ajaccio in June 2017. He made his professional debut for Gazélec Ajaccio in a 1–1 tie with FC Valenciennes on 28 July 2017.

In January 2019 Ba signed with the Greek club Olympiakos for an undisclosed fee, but it is decided to play till the end of the season in Ajaccio. His first appearance came against Lamia on 28 September 2019. During the 2019–20 season, Avraam Papadopoulos’ injuries along with those of Rúben Semedo and Pape Abou Cissé suddenly brought the previously fifth-choice center-back, Ba into the side. This was the opportunity the player needed. After coming into the starting line-up in early December versus Panetolikos, Ba remained there until the season was interrupted by the COVID-19 pandemic. During that stretch, Ba played 16 matches in less than 100 days, participating as a starter in every one of those games.

On 29 August 2023, Ba joined Süper Lig club Başakşehir on a season-long loan deal with the option to make the transfer permanent.

== International career ==
On 8 March 2020, the 25-year-old central defender was called to the Senegal national team for the first time in his career. Within six months, the African has managed to win a place in Olympiacos squad, play in the Europa League and called for the two upcoming matches for the 2020 African Cup Qualifiers, against Guinea Bissau on 28 and 31 March. He first represented the Senegal national team in a friendly 3-1 loss to Morocco on 9 October 2020.

== Career statistics ==
=== Club ===
As of 7 July 2024

Club	Season	League			National Cup		League Cup		Continental		Total	
Club	Season	Division	Apps	Goals	Apps	Goals	Apps	Goals	Apps	Goals	Apps	Goals
Gazélec Ajaccio	2017–18	Ligue 2	28	0	2	0	2	0	—		32	0
Gazélec Ajaccio	2018–19	Ligue 2	29	1	2	0	1	0	—		34	1
Gazélec Ajaccio	Total		57	1	4	0	3	0	—		66	1
Olympiacos	2019–20	Super League Greece	22	0	2	0	—		5	0	29	0
Olympiacos	2020–21	Super League Greece	19	1	4	0	—		8	0	31	1
Olympiacos	2021–22	Super League Greece	18	0	3	0	—		7	0	28	0
Olympiacos	2022–23	Super League Greece	19	0	1	0	—		5	0	25	0
Olympiacos	Total		78	1	10	0	—		25	0	113	1
İstanbul Başakşehir (loan)	2023–24	Süper Lig	22	0	3	0	—		—		25	0
Career total			157	2	17	0	3	0	25	0	204	2

== Honours ==
Olympiacos

- Super League Greece: 2019–20, 2020–21, 2021–22
- Greek Cup: 2019–20
