= Rúben Semedo =

Portuguese association footballer (born 1994)

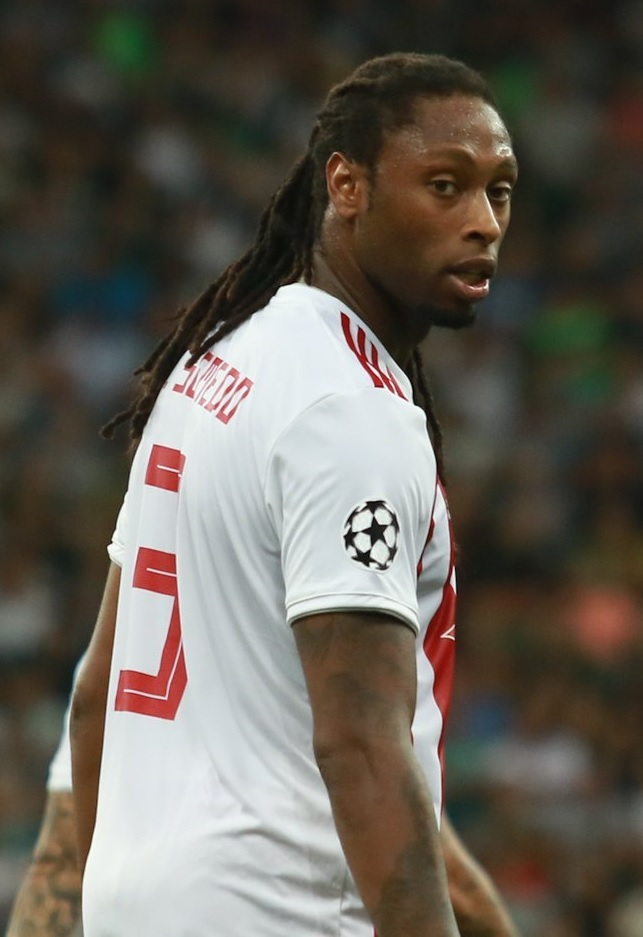
- Semedo with Olympiacos in 2019

Personal information
- Full name: Rúben Afonso Borges Semedo
- Date of birth: 4 April 1994 (age 32)
- Place of birth: Amadora, Portugal
- Height: 1.89 m (6 ft 2 in)
- Position: Centre-back

Youth career
- 2006–2007: Sacavenense
- 2007–2010: Futebol Benfica
- 2010–2013: Sporting CP

Senior career*
Years	Team	Apps	(Gls)
2013–2014	Sporting CP B	23	(1)
2014–2017	Sporting CP	38	(0)
2014–2015	→ Reus (loan)	16	(0)
2015–2016	→ Vitória Setúbal (loan)	15	(0)
2017–2019	Villarreal	4	(0)
2018–2019	→ Huesca (loan)	11	(0)
2019	→ Rio Ave (loan)	14	(2)
2019–2022	Olympiacos	57	(2)
2022	→ Porto B (loan)	3	(0)
2022	→ Porto (loan)	1	(0)
2022–2024	Al-Duhail	22	(0)
2024	Al-Markhiya	9	(1)
2024–2025	Al-Khor	13	(2)
2025	Al-Markhiya	3	(0)
2025–2026	AVS	9	(0)

International career
2014	Portugal U20	4	(1)
2016–2017	Portugal U21	10	(3)
2020	Portugal	3	(0)
- * Club domestic league appearances and goals as of 20:40, 2 February 2026 (UTC)

Rúben Afonso Borges Semedo (born 4 April 1994) is a Portuguese professional footballer who plays as a central defender.

Developed at Sporting CP, he went to on to serve two loans then make 48 competitive appearances for its first team. In 2017 he signed with Villarreal and, after two years and as many loans, joined Olympiacos where he won several titles, including two Super League Greece championships.

Semedo made his full debut for Portugal in 2020. His career has been marred by legal problems off the field.

== Club career ==
=== Sporting CP ===
Born in Amadora in the Lisbon metropolitan area of Cape Verdean descent, Semedo joined Sporting CP's youth system at the age of 16. On 11 August 2013, he made his debut with the first team, scoring in a friendly with Fiorentina.

Semedo spent the 2013–14 season with the B team in the Segunda Liga, his first appearance in the competition occurring on 25 August 2013 as he played the full 90 minutes in a 1–0 home win against Trofense. On 26 August 2014, he, alongside teammate Vítor, was loaned to Spanish side Reus.

For the 2015–16 campaign, Semedo was promoted to the main squad. He made his competitive debut – winning his first trophy in the process – on 9 August, coming on as a late substitute in a 1–0 victory over Benfica in the Supertaça Cândido de Oliveira. Five days later, however, he was loaned to fellow top-flight club Vitória de Setúbal.

Semedo was sent off twice during his brief spell in Setúbal, including once in a game against Rio Ave in the Taça de Portugal. In the 2016 January transfer window, he was recalled by Sporting due to a defensive injury crisis.

On 18 February 2016, Semedo played his first game in European competition, being sent off after two bookable offences in a 1–0 home loss to Bayer Leverkusen in the last 32 of the UEFA Europa League. On 9 March, he signed a new contract until 2022 with a release clause being set at €45 million.

=== Villarreal ===
Semedo was transferred to Villarreal on 7 June 2017, for €14 million. He made his La Liga debut on 25 August, playing the entire 3–0 away defeat against Real Sociedad. After Javier Calleja took over as head coach on 25 September he fell out of favour, and having seen himself become a rotation player his stint was also plagued by injuries, which ultimately required surgery in December.

On 19 July 2018, Semedo was loaned to newly promoted club Huesca for the upcoming season. The decision to sign him attracted some criticism, but sporting director Emilio Vega stated that the player would be in good shape once the season began because he played some matches while in prison; moreover, Vega stated that they would not be monitoring his off-field behaviour. "I was very keen to play again and Huesca have given me an opportunity to do so in the first division. I didn't hesitate to accept their offer", Semedo said at his introductory press conference.

Still owned by Villarreal, and after being deemed surplus to requirements by manager Francisco, Semedo returned to Portugal on 29 January 2019, signing with Rio Ave until June.

=== Olympiacos ===
On 25 June 2019, Semedo joined Olympiacos for €4.5 million signing a four-year contract; Villarreal retained a 20% resale rate on the player and he was to earn around €700,000 per year, being the club's second-most expensive defender after Belgian Björn Engels was bought from Club Brugge for €7 million in 2017 and sharing teams with compatriots Pedro Martins (manager), Daniel Podence and José Sá. He scored his first goal for the team on 30 July, with a close-range effort following a corner from Georgios Masouras after Aleš Hruška saved Yassine Meriah's shot, in a 4–0 home win over Viktoria Plzeň in the UEFA Champions League's second qualifying round. He repeated the feat in the next stage of the same competition, as the hosts beat İstanbul Başakşehir 2–0 and won 3–0 on aggregate.

Semedo won the Super League Greece and Cup double in his first season in Piraeus. He was a late substitute in the latter's final on 12 September 2020, a single-goal victory against AEK Athens. The following summer, he was lined up to join several compatriots at Wolverhampton Wanderers, but he was denied a work permit by the UK Home Office due to his criminal record.

On 1 December 2021, in his first match for nearly four months due to off-the-field issues, Semedo scored in a 3–2 defeat at Levadiakos in the last 16 of the cup. The following month, he was hospitalised after being beaten at his doorstep by hooded men.

On 31 January 2022, Semedo moved to Porto on a five-month loan worth €350,000, with the deal including an unspecified buying option. In order to regain his fitness, he started playing with the reserve team.

=== Qatar ===
Semedo joined Al-Duhail of the Qatar Stars League on 1 August 2022, on a three-year contract with an annual salary of €5 million; Olympiacos retained 50% of the player's rights. Managed by Hernán Crespo, he won a treble of the league, cup and league cup in his first season in Doha.

On 24 January 2024, the free agent Semedo signed for Al-Markhiya also in the Qatari top division. In July, he moved to Al-Khor in the same league.

=== Later career ===
Semedo returned to Portuguese football on 14 October 2025, on a short-term deal at top-flight club AVS.

== International career ==
On 24 March 2016, Semedo marked his debut for the Portugal under-21 team with a goal, scoring the opener in a 4–0 home defeat of Liechtenstein in the 2017 UEFA European Under-21 Championship qualifiers played in Ponta Delgada. In October 2019, while still awaiting trial for alleged crimes in Spain, he received his first call-up to the senior team ahead of UEFA Euro 2020 qualification matches against Luxembourg and Ukraine.

Semedo won his first full cap on 7 October 2020, playing the entire 0–0 friendly draw with Spain.

== Legal issues and convictions ==
In January 2018, it was announced that Semedo would stand trial for an altercation in a bar in Valencia the previous November, when the player allegedly brandished a pistol and made threats while he was nursing an injury. He was arrested again for a separate incident on 20 February, this time for allegedly tying up and torturing a man in his home alongside two others, then going to the victim's house to burgle it. For the latter incident, he was charged with attempted murder and placed in preventive detention.

Semedo was released from prison on 13 July 2018, after paying bail of €30,000. Facing a maximum 15 1/2-year sentence, he confessed two years later to kidnap, robbery, wounding and illegal firearm possession; he was fined €46,000 and banned from entering Spain for the next eight years.

On 30 August 2021, Semedo was arrested in Athens following a gang rape allegation filed by a 17-year-old teenager after a night out in Oropos. Police arrested a second man, also accused of leading the girl to Semedo's house where the actions allegedly took place. The player was freed from custody days later after paying a €10,000 bond.

In the early hours of 29 December 2024, Semedo was arrested in Vila Franca de Xira after reportedly physically assaulting and keeping his girlfriend captive.

== Career statistics ==
=== Club ===
As of match played 22 August 2022

Appearances and goals by club, season and competition
Club	Season	League			National Cup (Note: Includes Taça de Portugal, Copa del Rey, Greek Cup)		League Cup (Note: Includes Taça da Liga)		Europe		Other		Total	
Club	Season	Division	Apps	Goals	Apps	Goals	Apps	Goals	Apps	Goals	Apps	Goals	Apps	Goals
Sporting CP B	2013–14	Segunda Liga	23	1	—		—		—		—		23	1
Sporting CP	2013–14	Primeira Liga	0	0	1	0	0	0	—		—		1	0
Sporting CP	2015–16	Primeira Liga	14	0	0	0	0	0	1 (Note: Appearance in UEFA Europa League)	0	1 (Note: Appearance in Supertaça Cândido de Oliveira)	0	16	0
Sporting CP	2016–17	Primeira Liga	24	0	1	0	0	0	6 (Note: Appearances in UEFA Champions League)	0	—		31	0
Sporting CP	Total		38	0	2	0	0	0	7	0	1	0	48	0
Reus (loan)	2014–15	Segunda División B	16	0	—		—		—		—		16	0
Vitória Setúbal (loan)	2015–16	Primeira Liga	15	0	3	0	1	0	—		—		19	0
Villarreal	2017–18	La Liga	4	0	0	0	—		1	0	—		5	0
Huesca (loan)	2018–19	La Liga	11	0	1	0	—		—		—		12	0
Rio Ave (loan)	2018–19	Primeira Liga	14	2	—		—		—		—		14	2
Olympiacos	2019–20	Super League Greece	27	1	4	0	—		14 (Note: Twelve appearances and four goals in UEFA Champions League, two appearances in UEFA Europa League)	4	—		45	5
Olympiacos	2020–21	Super League Greece	30	1	5	0	—		9 (Note: Eight appearances in UEFA Champions League, one appearance in UEFA Europa League)	0	—		44	1
Olympiacos	2021–22	Super League Greece	0	0	1	1	—		4	0	—		5	1
Olympiacos	Total		57	2	10	1	—		27	4	—		94	7
Porto B (loan)	2021–22	Liga Portugal 2	3	0	-		-		-		-		3	0
Porto (loan)	2021–22	Primeira Liga	1	0	0	0	—		1	0	—		2	0
Al-Duhail	2022–23	Qatar Stars League	4	0	0	0	0	0	0	0	0	0	4	0
Career total			186	5	16	1	1	0	36	4	1	0	240	10

=== International ===
Appearances and goals by national team and year
National team	Year	Apps	Goals
Portugal	2020	3	0
Total		3	0

== Honours ==
Sporting CP

- Supertaça Cândido de Oliveira: 2015

Olympiacos

- Super League Greece: 2019–20, 2020–21
- Greek Football Cup: 2019–20

Porto

- Primeira Liga: 2021–22

Al-Duhail

- Qatar Stars League: 2022–23
- Qatar Cup: 2023
- Qatari Stars Cup: 2022–23

Individual

- Super League Greece Team of the Season: 2019–20, 2020–21
