= Ahmed Hassan (footballer, born 1993) =

Egyptian footballer

Ahmed Hassan أَحْمَد حَسَن
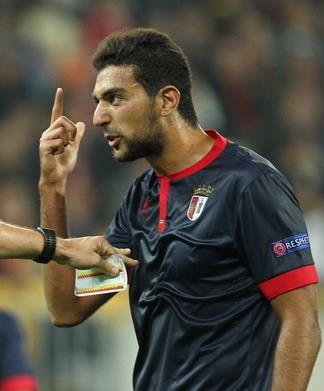
- Kouka playing for Braga in 2016

Personal information
- Full name: Ahmed Hassan Mohamed Abdelmonem Mohamed Mahgoub
- Date of birth: 5 March 1993 (age 33)
- Place of birth: Cairo, Egypt
- Height: 1.91 m (6 ft 3 in)
- Position: Striker

Youth career
- 2010–2011: Al Ahly
- 2011–2012: Rio Ave

Senior career*
Years	Team	Apps	(Gls)
2012–2015	Rio Ave	66	(24)
2015–2020	Braga	63	(18)
2018–2019	→ Olympiacos (loan)	22	(11)
2020	→ Olympiacos (loan)	14	(6)
2020–2023	Olympiacos	26	(10)
2021–2022	→ Konyaspor (loan)	30	(8)
2022–2023	→ Alanyaspor (loan)	24	(10)
2023–2024	Pendikspor	4	(0)
2024	Alanyaspor	12	(6)
2024–2025	Rio Ave	9	(1)
2025	Le Havre	16	(3)
2025–2026	Al-Ettifaq	11	(1)

International career^{‡}
2011	Egypt U19	2	(1)
2011–2013	Egypt U20	25	(7)
2011–2014	Egypt U23	4	(1)
2013–2024	Egypt	32	(6)
Medal record
Representing Egypt
Men's football
Africa Cup of Nations
Runner-up	2017 Gabon
Africa U-20 Cup of Nations
Winner	2013 Algeria
- * Club domestic league appearances and goals as of 1st June 2026 ‡ National team caps and goals as of 19:38, 1st June 2026 (UTC)

Ahmed Hassan Mohamed Abdelmonem Mohamed Mahgoub (Arabic: أَحْمَد حَسَن مُحَمَّد عَبْد الْمُنْعِم مُحَمَّد مَحْجُوب; born 5 March 1993), known as Kouka or Koka, is an Egyptian professional footballer who plays as a striker for the Egypt national team.

He began his career in his native Egypt in the youth academy at Al Ahly but joined Portuguese side Rio Ave in 2012 without appearing for the first team. He made his professional debut for Rio Ave in September 2012. In 2015, he joined rival Portuguese club Braga, helping the club win the Taça de Portugal during his first season at the club.

He represented Egypt at under-20 and under-23 level before making his debut for the senior squad in August 2013, scoring in a victory over Uganda. He was part of the Egypt squad that reached the final of the 2017 Africa Cup of Nations.

== Early life ==
Ahmed Hassan Mahgoub was born on 5 March 1993 in Cairo, Egypt. He was given the nickname Kouka (sometimes spelt Koka) because he liked the soft drink Coca-Cola as a child.

== Club career ==
=== Rio Ave ===
Kouka began his career as a youth player with Al Ahly. He trained regularly with the first team but struggled to break into the side as manager Manuel José de Jesus later commented that "the only reason he didn't play for us was that I had the best strikers in Egypt." His lack of playing time led Kouka to leave Egypt and rescind his contract with the club before, in December 2011, joining the youth academy at Portuguese side Rio Ave.

Kouka played for Rio Ave's youth team for one season and was promoted to the first team at the start of the 2012–13 season, making his professional debut on 9 September 2012 against Paços de Ferreira. Entering the match as a late substitute, he saw an effort cleared off the line in stoppage time. He eventually scored his first senior goal in his third appearance for the club, a 3–2 defeat to Paços de Ferreira in the Taça de Portugal, netting a late consolation goal. His first league goal came in January 2013, scoring three minutes after coming on as a substitute during a 3–1 defeat to Vitória. He scored six times in his first eight senior appearances, before his run ended after he was sent off during a 1–1 draw against Braga for a stamp on Vincent Sasso. He finished his first season of senior football with ten goals in all competitions for Rio Ave.

At the start of the following season, Kouka scored his first goal of the campaign after converting a penalty during a 2–0 victory over Vitória Setúbal. However, he initially struggled to reproduce his form from his debut season, enduring a goal drought that lasted nearly three months, coming to an end in November 2013. In the second half of the season, Kouka helped Rio Ave reach the final of the Taça da Liga, converting a penalty during a 2–1 win Braga in the semi-final, and the final of the Taça de Portugal, reaching the final for only the second time in the club's history. However, they suffered defeats to Benfica in both finals.

Rio Ave's appearance in the Taça de Portugal final the previous season saw the club qualify for European competition for the first time in its history. In the club's first European fixture, a UEFA Europa League match against Sweden side IFK Göteborg, Kouka scored the only goal of the match to give Rio Ave a 1–0 aggregate lead. In the club's opening league fixture of the 2014–15 season, Kouka became the first Egyptian player since Mohamed Zidan in 2007 to score a hat-trick in a top tier European league after scoring three times during a 5–1 victory over Estoril. Kouka enjoyed a prolific first half of the season, scoring eleven goals by January to surpass his previous career season goal record and helped his side reach the group stage of the Europa League. His form led rival Portuguese side Sporting CP to submit an unsuccessful offer of €1 million for Kouka.

He went on to finish the 2014–15 season with twelve league goals, the joint fifth highest in the division, and fifteen in all competitions despite missing the final two months of the season with injury. Sporting CP maintained an interest in signing Kouka but refused to move from their €1 million offer, falling short of Rio Ave's valuation. During the summer transfer window, fellow Portuguese side Benfica made an approach for Kouka, along with teammates Ederson Moraes and Diego Lopes, meeting Rio Ave's valuation of €1.5 million. After signing a pre-contract agreement for a five-year deal, Kouka's transfer was delayed after a medical showed signs of a potential heart defect. He underwent a second medical examination and Rio Ave denied any heart problems but the move was eventually cancelled after Benfica decided to rescind their offer. Kouka's former Al Ahly coach, Manuel José de Jesus, later stated his belief that Benfica had pulled out of the transfer due to similarities with Miklós Fehér, who collapsed and died while playing for Benfica due to an undiagnosed heart condition.

=== Braga ===
On 26 August 2015, days after scoring a winning goal against the club for Rio Ave, Kouka signed a five-year contract with Braga, later commenting on the move "It's very good for me. This summer was hard for me, but I'm happy with the choice I made." He made his debut for the side as a substitute during a 4–0 victory over Boavista, winning a penalty for his side's final goal. He scored his first goal for the club in a 1–0 victory over Dutch side FC Groningen in the Europa League.

On 22 October 2015, he scored the first goal in Braga's 3–2 Europa League group stage win against Olympique de Marseille. In tears during his celebration, Kouka dedicated the goal to his father, who had died the day before, stating "It was a special moment for me and for my family. I'm here because of my father. I did not want to give up. I tried to score a goal for him." He missed the club's following match, against FC Porto, to attend the funeral. In his first season with Braga, Kouka scored fourteen goals in all competitions, including braces against Académica and former club Rio Ave, helping the side reach the quarterfinals of the Europa League. They also went on to win the Taça de Portugal after defeating Porto in a penalty shootout in the final.

His second season with the club was disrupted largely by injury, being forced to undergo abdominal wall reconstruction surgery, and being named in Egypt's squad for the 2017 Africa Cup of Nations. He finished the season with two goals in fourteen league appearances. The following season, Kouka was dropped from the first team under new coach Abel Ferreira, featuring largely as a substitute throughout the year. He later commented on his relationship with Ferreira, stating "I always had problems with the coach (Ferreira)." In March 2018, Kouka made his 100th appearance in all competitions for Braga against Moreirense.

==== First loan to Olympiacos ====
In August 2018, Kouka joined Greek club Olympiacos on a season-long loan from Braga for an undisclosed fee. He made his debut for the club on 26 August 2018 as a substitute in place of Felipe Pardo during a 1–0 victory over Levadiakos. On 25 February 2019, Ahmed Hassan hit a hat-trick as Olympiacos defeated OFI 5–1 at the Karaiskakis Stadium.

==== Second loan to Olympiacos ====
On 29 January 2020, Kouka rejoined Olympiacos on loan with a buyout option in the summer for €2.5 million. On 9 February 2020, he came off the bench to score a match-winning goal for Olympiacos against Atromitos in a 1–0 away win which saw the visitors reduced to 10 players due to captain Omar Elabdellaoui's red card with 17 minutes left. For most of the second half of the season he was used as a substitute for forward Youssef El-Arabi but also played alongside him. From joining Olympiacos until April he scored five goals and registered one assist in 15 matches. On 1 July 2020, he gave Pedro Martins' side another Super League play-offs 2–1 home win against OFI by scoring a brace.

=== Olympiacos ===
On 21 August 2020, Kouka signed a three-year contract with Olympiacos, the transfer fee was around €2 million. Two months later, on 21 October 2020, he grabbed a 91st-minute winner against Marseille in the Champions League, after an assist from Mathieu Valbuena.

On 25 February 2021, Kouka scored an 88th-minute difficult point-blank range away goal against PSV, in his team's 2–1 defeat for the first knockout round of the Europa League. This goal sealed Olympiacos' 5–4 win on aggregate and their qualification for the competition's last 16.

==== Loans to Turkey ====
Kouka joined Süper Lig club Konyaspor on a season-long loan in September 2021. A year later, he was loaned out to fellow Turkish club Alanyaspor for the 2022–23 season.

=== Pendikspor and return to Alanyaspor ===
On 15 September 2023, Kouka joined newly promoted Turkish Süper Lig club Pendikspor. In February 2024, he re-signed with Alanyaspor until the end of the 2023–24 season.

=== Return to Rio Ave ===
On 31 August 2024, Kouka rejoined Portuguese side Rio Ave on a free transfer.

=== Le Havre ===
On 13 January 2025, Kouka signed with French club Le Havre until the end of the season.

=== Al-Ettifaq ===
On 31 July 2025, Kouka joined Al-Ettifaq in Saudi Arabia.

== International career ==
As an Egyptian under-20 international player, Kouka was part of the side that finished third at the 2011 African Youth Championship and qualified for the 2011 FIFA U-20 World Cup. During the 2013 FIFA U-20 World Cup two years later, he scored twice against Iraq and England, while assisting his country's only goal against Chile as Egypt were eliminated in the group stage.

Kouka received his first call up to the Egyptian senior squad from manager Bob Bradley in January 2013 at the age of nineteen. Having played only seven senior matches at club level, he was named in the squad for a friendly match against Chile but did not feature. He made his debut for Egypt in August 2013, scoring once during a 3–0 victory over Uganda. In 2017, Kouka was named in Egypt's squad for the 2017 Africa Cup of Nations. However, after featuring in his country's victory over Morocco in the quarterfinal, he was ruled out of the remainder of the tournament with a pelvic injury as Egypt finished as runners-up.

In May 2018, he was named in Egypt's preliminary squad for the 2018 FIFA World Cup in Russia but was omitted from the final 23-man squad by coach Héctor Cúper. Kouka later expressed his disappointment at being excluded, commenting "I hope nobody experiences what I felt after the announcement of the team's final 23."

== Career statistics ==
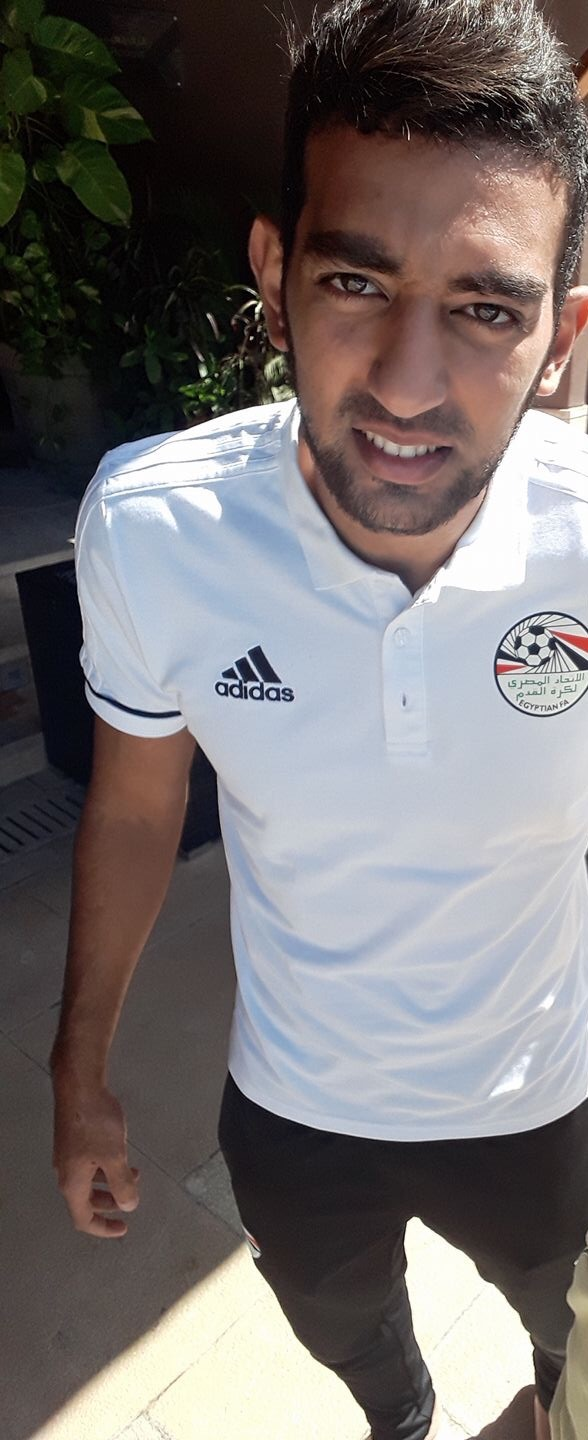
Ahmed Hassan with the Egypt national team

=== Club ===
As of match played 17 May 2025

Appearances and goals by club, season and competition
Club	Season	League			National cup		League cup		Continental		Other (Note: Includes Portuguese Super Cup)		Total	
Club	Season	Division	Apps	Goals	Apps	Goals	Apps	Goals	Apps	Goals	Apps	Goals	Apps	Goals
Rio Ave	2012–13	Primeira Liga	17	8	2	0	5	2	–		–		24	10
Rio Ave	2013–14	Primeira Liga	25	3	7	1	4	2	–		–		36	6
Rio Ave	2014–15	Primeira Liga	22	12	3	2	1	0	9	1	–		35	15
Rio Ave	2015–16	Primeira Liga	2	1	–		–		–		–		2	1
Rio Ave	Total		66	24	12	3	10	4	9	1	0	0	97	32
Braga	2015–16	Primeira Liga	23	10	6	0	4	1	11	3	–		44	14
Braga	2016–17	Primeira Liga	14	2	1	0	1	0	6	2	1	0	23	4
Braga	2017–18	Primeira Liga	20	5	1	0	3	0	10	1	0	0	34	6
Braga	2019–20	Primeira Liga	6	1	0	0	0	0	1	0	–		7	1
Braga	Total		63	18	8	0	8	1	28	6	1	0	108	25
Olympiacos (loan)	2018–19	Super League Greece	22	11	5	2	–		5	2	–		32	15
Olympiacos (loan)	2019–20	Super League Greece	14	6	3	2	–		1	0	–		18	8
Olympiacos	2020–21	Super League Greece	25	10	7	3	–		7	2	–		39	15
Olympiacos	2021–22	Super League Greece	0	0	0	0	–		5	0	–		5	0
Olympiacos	2022–23	Super League Greece	1	0	0	0	-		1	0	-		2	0
Konyaspor (loan)	2021–22	Süper Lig	30	8	3	3	–		0	0	–		33	11
Alanyaspor (loan)	2022–23	Süper Lig	24	10	2	1	–		–		–		26	11
Pendikspor	2023–24	Süper Lig	4	0	1	3	–		–		–		5	3
Alanyaspor	2023–24	Süper Lig	12	6	0	0	–		–		–		12	6
Rio Ave	2024–25	Primeira Liga	9	1	2	1	0	0	–		–		11	2
Le Havre (loan)	2024–25	Ligue 1	16	3	–		–		–		–		16	3
Career total			274	91	41	18	18	5	56	10	1	0	389	125

=== International ===
As of match played 28 March 2023

Appearances and goals by national team and year
National team	Year	Apps	Goals
Egypt	2013	1	1
Egypt	2014	2	0
Egypt	2015	3	4
Egypt	2016	4	0
Egypt	2017	5	0
Egypt	2018	4	0
Egypt	2019	3	0
Egypt	2020	3	0
Egypt	2021	1	0
Egypt	2022	3	1
Egypt	2023	2	0
Total		31	6

Scores and results list Egypt's goal tally first, score column indicates score after each Hassan goal.

List of international goals scored by Ahmed Hassan
No.	Date	Venue	Opponent	Score	Result	Competition
1	14 August 2013	El Gouna Stadium, El Gouna, Egypt	Uganda	1–0	3–0	Friendly
2	11 October 2015	Mohammed Bin Zayed Stadium, Abu Dhabi, United Arab Emirates	Zambia	1–0	3–0	Friendly
3	11 October 2015	Mohammed Bin Zayed Stadium, Abu Dhabi, United Arab Emirates	Zambia	2–0	3–0	Friendly
4	17 November 2015	Borg El Arab Stadium, Alexandria, Egypt	Chad	3–0	4–0	2018 FIFA World Cup qualification
5	17 November 2015	Borg El Arab Stadium, Alexandria, Egypt	Chad	4–0	4–0	2018 FIFA World Cup qualification

== Honours ==
Braga

- Taça de Portugal: 2015–16

Olympiacos

- Super League Greece: 2019–20, 2020–21
- Greek Football Cup: 2019–20

Egypt

- African U-20 Championship: 2013
- Africa Cup of Nations runner-up: 2017
