= José Sá =

Portuguese footballer (born 1993)

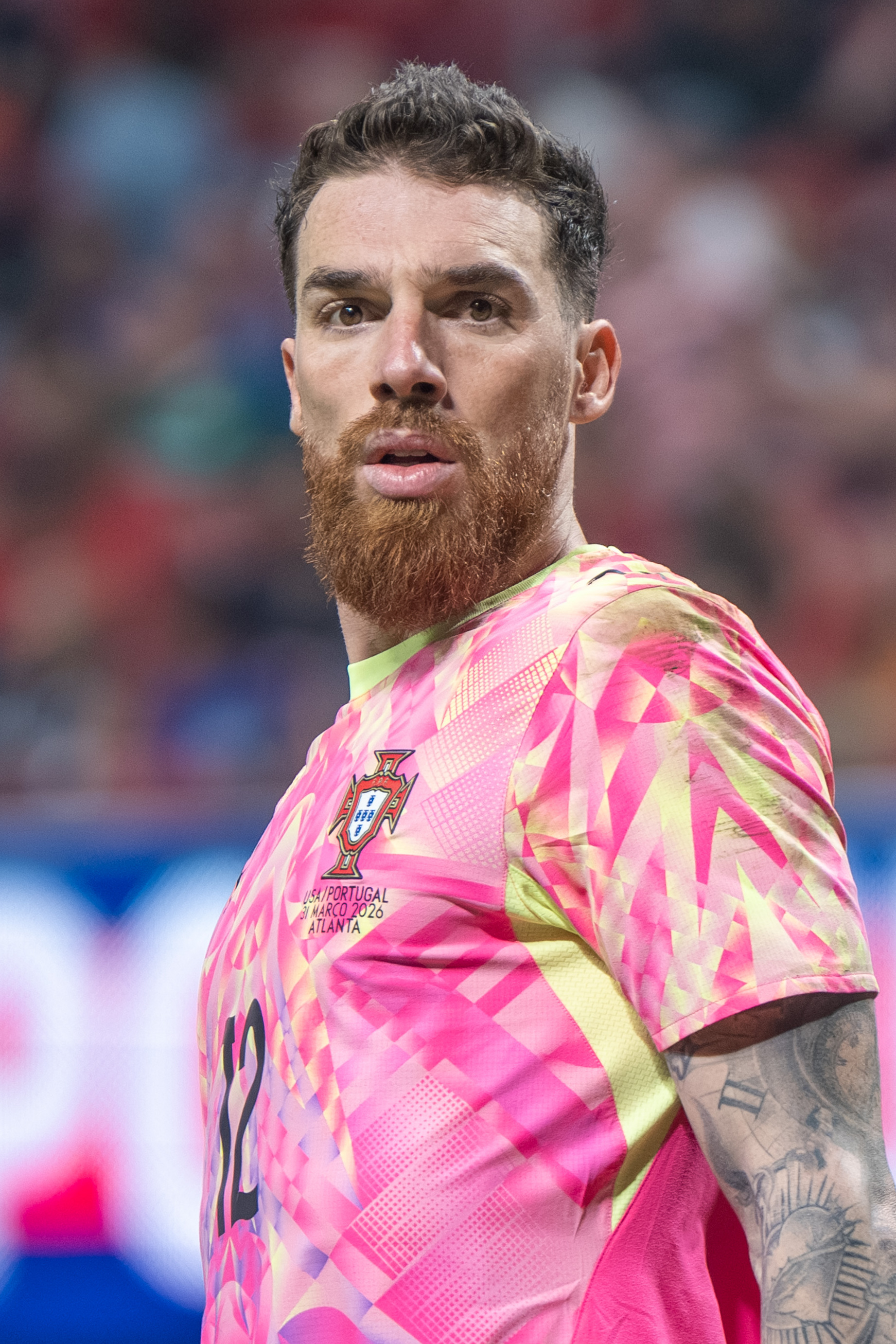
- Sá with Portugal in 2026

Personal information
- Full name: José Pedro Malheiro de Sá
- Date of birth: 17 January 1993 (age 33)
- Place of birth: Braga, Portugal
- Height: 1.92 m (6 ft 4 in)
- Position: Goalkeeper

Team information
- Current team: Wolverhampton Wanderers
- Number: 1

Youth career
- 2002–2009: Palmeiras Braga
- 2009–2010: Merelinense
- 2011: Benfica
- 2011–2012: Marítimo

Senior career*
Years	Team	Apps	(Gls)
2012–2015	Marítimo B	75	(0)
2013–2016	Marítimo	16	(0)
2016	Porto B	16	(0)
2016–2019	Porto	15	(0)
2018–2019	→ Olympiacos (loan)	21	(0)
2019–2021	Olympiacos	62	(0)
2021–	Wolverhampton Wanderers	172	(0)

International career^{‡}
2012–2013	Portugal U20	14	(0)
2013–2015	Portugal U21	16	(0)
2016	Portugal U23	1	(0)
2023–	Portugal	5	(0)
Medal record
Men's football
Representing Portugal
UEFA Nations League
Winner	2019 Portugal
Winner	2025 Germany
FIFA Confederations Cup
Bronze medal – third place	2017 Russia
UEFA European Under-21 Championship
Runner-up	2015 Czech Republic
- * Club domestic league appearances and goals as of 31 October 2026 ‡ National team caps and goals as of 6 June 2026

José Pedro Malheiro de Sá (Portuguese pronunciation: [ʒuˈzɛ sa]; born 17 January 1993) is a Portuguese professional footballer who plays as a goalkeeper for EFL Championship club Wolverhampton Wanderers and the Portugal national team.

He started his career with Marítimo B, making his debut with the first team in 2013, before signing for FC Porto in 2016. Sá was loaned for one year to Super League Greece side Olympiacos in 2018, in a deal which was made permanent at the end of the season. With Olympiacos, he won two Super League Greece titles and the Greek Cup, including a domestic double in 2020. In 2021, he signed with Wolverhampton Wanderers.

Sá is a former Portuguese under-21 international, reaching the European Championship final in 2015. He was part of the full squad that finished third at the 2017 Confederations Cup and won the 2019 UEFA Nations League Finals on home soil, and was also chosen for the FIFA World Cup in 2022 and 2026. He made his senior international debut in 2023.

== Club career ==
=== Marítimo ===
Born in Braga, Sá went from Merelinense to the youth ranks of Benfica in January 2011, and moved six months later to Madeira's Marítimo to finish his development at the age of 18. On 23 January 2013 he made his professional debut with the B team, playing the full 90 minutes in a 0–0 home draw against Oliveirense in the Segunda Liga championship.

In the 2013 off-season, Sá was promoted to the main squad by manager Pedro Martins. He played his first game in the Primeira Liga on 18 August in a 2–1 home win over Benfica, and kept his position for the following matchday, a 3–0 loss at Porto.

During his tenure in Funchal, Sá acted as understudy to Frenchman Romain Salin.

=== Porto ===
On 25 January 2016, both Sá and teammate Moussa Marega joined Porto on four-and-a-half-year contracts, with the services of the former being acquired for €1.5 million. During his early spell, he was second choice to Spain international Iker Casillas.

Sá made his debut in the UEFA Champions League on 17 October 2017, starting in a 3–2 loss for the group stage away to RB Leipzig and committing a blunder in the eighth minute which resulted in the opposition's first goal. He became the starter from that point onwards but, following a 5–0 home defeat against Liverpool in the same competition, lost his place again.

=== Olympiacos ===
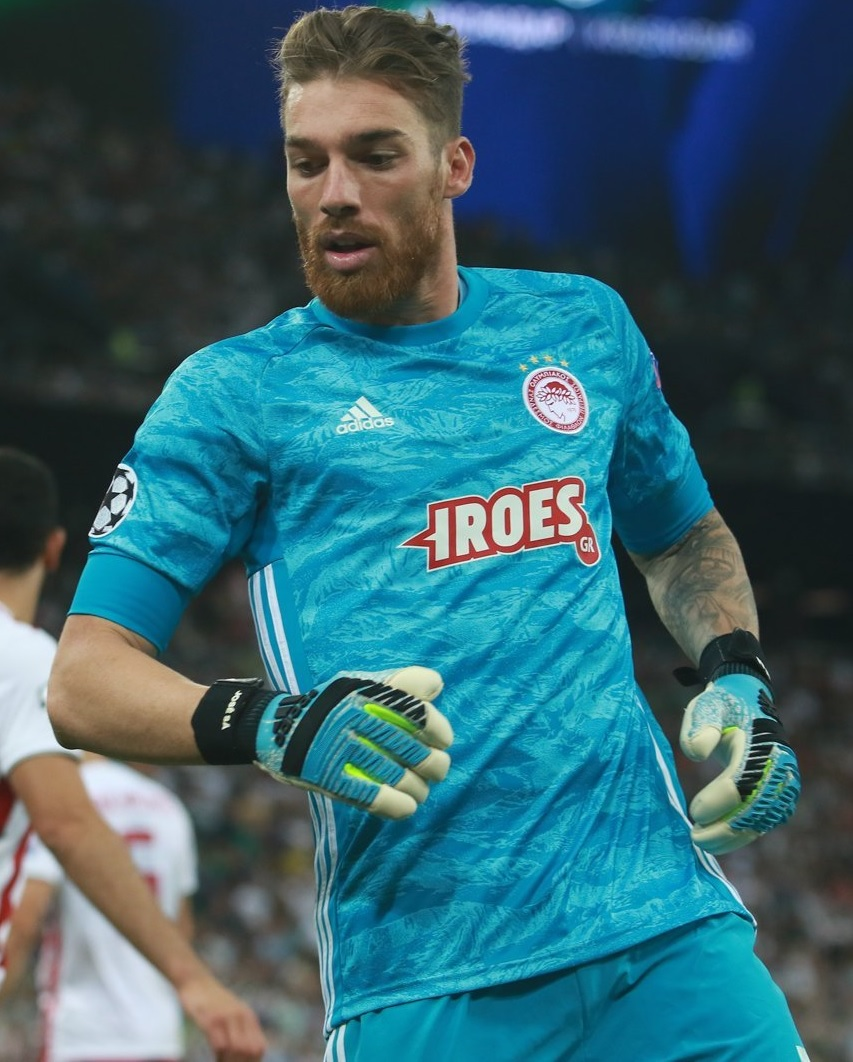
Sá playing for Olympiacos in 2019

On 31 August 2018, deemed surplus to requirements by manager Sérgio Conceição, Sá joined Olympiacos on a season-long loan. He became first choice over Andreas Gianniotis shortly after arriving, as the team was coached by his compatriot and former Marítimo boss Martins.

On 15 May 2019, Sá agreed to a permanent four-year deal. During the campaign, he kept a total of 18 clean sheets as the team from Piraeus won the double, though he missed the Cup final through injury.

Sá was again a league winner in 2020–21. However, his team were beaten to the Cup by PAOK.

=== Wolverhampton Wanderers ===
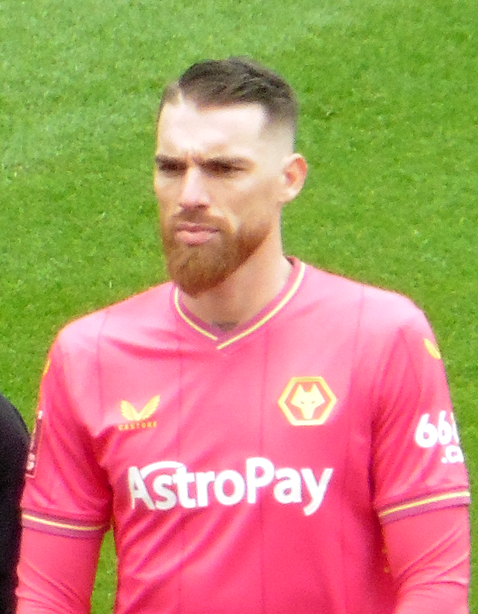
Sá lines up for Wolverhampton Wanderers (March 2024)

On 15 July 2021, Sá joined English club Wolverhampton Wanderers for a €8 million transfer fee, on a five-year deal; he was signed to replace his experienced compatriot Rui Patrício who had joined Roma, and he was handed the number 1 jersey that had not been worn at the Molineux club since Carl Ikeme retired due to his leukaemia diagnosis in 2018.

Sá made his Premier League debut on 14 August 2021 in a 1–0 loss away to Leicester City. In September, he provided an assist for Raúl Jiménez against Southampton in their 1–0 win, making him the first Wolves goalkeeper to do so in the Premier League since Wayne Hennessey in October 2009. His string of good all-round performances, including his distribution and shot stopping helped Wolves to a run of three clean sheets, earning the club's Player of the Month, with former Manchester United player Gary Neville praising Sá as the signing of the season. On 11 November, despite losing 1–0 to Manchester City, Sá received several praises for his performance, making several vital saves, despite Wolves being reduced to 10 men just before half-time, only failing to defend a penalty. On 15 May 2022, Sá won both Wolves's Fans' Player of the 2021–22 Season, and the Players' Player of the 2021–22 Season awards.

On 14 October 2022 it was revealed that Sá had been playing for two months with a fractured wrist sustained during a 0–0 home draw with Fulham in the second match of the season, a game in which he saved a penalty from Aleksandar Mitrović – the first penalty save he had made in a Wolves shirt since joining the club. The following day, he saved another penalty from Brennan Johnson in a 1–0 home win against Nottingham Forest, with ten minutes remaining.

Sà made his 100th competitive appearance for Wolves in a 4–2 win away to Chelsea in the Premier League on 4 February 2024.

== International career ==
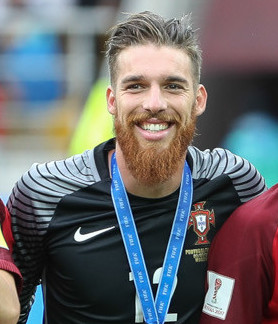
Sá with Portugal at the 2017 FIFA Confederations Cup

=== Youth ===
Sá represented Portugal at the 2013 FIFA U-20 World Cup. He played all the matches and minutes in Turkey, in an eventual round-of-16 exit.

On 6 August 2013, Sá received his first call-up to the under-21 team, for a friendly game with Switzerland. He featured in the second half of the 5–2 win, on the 14th. Sá was first choice at the 2015 UEFA European Under-21 Championship, keeping clean sheets in all games but one as the national side finished in second place in the Czech Republic; in the final, he saved from Sweden's Abdul Khalili in the penalty shootout following a goalless draw at the Eden Arena.

=== Senior ===
On 25 May 2017, Sá was called to the full side for the first time, being named by manager Fernando Santos in a provisional 24-man squad for that year's FIFA Confederations Cup. Still uncapped, he was part of the squad that won the 2019 UEFA Nations League Finals on home soil in June but did not make an appearance.

Sá was chosen for the 2022 FIFA World Cup in Qatar.

On 16 November 2023, Sá made his debut for Portugal's senior team, starting in a 2–0 away victory over Liechtenstein in a qualifying match for UEFA Euro 2024.

== Career statistics ==
=== Club ===
As of match played 31 October 2026

Appearances and goals by club, season and competition
Club	Season	League			National cup (Note: Includes Taça de Portugal, Greek Cup, FA Cup)		League cup (Note: Includes Taça da Liga, EFL Cup)		Europe		Total	
Club	Season	Division	Apps	Goals	Apps	Goals	Apps	Goals	Apps	Goals	Apps	Goals
Marítimo B	2012–13	Segunda Liga	19	0	—		—		—		19	0
Marítimo B	2013–14	Segunda Liga	18	0	—		—		—		18	0
Marítimo B	2014–15	Segunda Liga	38	0	—		—		—		38	0
Marítimo B	Total		75	0	—		—		—		75	0
Marítimo	2013–14	Primeira Liga	8	0	1	0	2	0	—		11	0
Marítimo	2014–15	Primeira Liga	3	0	0	0	1	0	—		4	0
Marítimo	2015–16	Primeira Liga	5	0	2	0	2	0	—		9	0
Marítimo	Total		16	0	3	0	5	0	—		24	0
Porto B	2015–16	LigaPro	16	0	—		—		—		16	0
Porto	2016–17	Primeira Liga	1	0	2	0	3	0	—		6	0
Porto	2017–18	Primeira Liga	14	0	1	0	1	0	5 (Note: Appearances in UEFA Champions League)	0	21	0
Porto	Total		15	0	3	0	4	0	5	0	27	0
Olympiacos	2018–19	Super League Greece	21	0	3	0	—		7 (Note: Appearances in UEFA Europa League)	0	31	0
Olympiacos	2019–20	Super League Greece	33	0	1	0	—		15	0	49	0
Olympiacos	2020–21	Super League Greece	29	0	3	0	—		12 (Note: Eight appearances in UEFA Champions League, four appearances in UEFA Europa League)	0	44	0
Olympiacos	Total		83	0	7	0	—		34	0	124	0
Wolverhampton Wanderers	2021–22	Premier League	37	0	0	0	0	0	—		37	0
Wolverhampton Wanderers	2022–23	Premier League	36	0	1	0	2	0	—		39	0
Wolverhampton Wanderers	2023–24	Premier League	35	0	5	0	0	0	—		40	0
Wolverhampton Wanderers	2024–25	Premier League	29	0	0	0	1	0	—		30	0
Wolverhampton Wanderers	2025–26	Premier League	23	0	0	0	1	0	—		24	0
Wolverhampton Wanderers	2026–27	Championship	12	0	0	0	1	0	—		13	0
Wolverhampton Wanderers	Total		172	0	6	0	5	0	—		183	0
Career total			377	0	19	0	14	0	39	0	449	0

=== International ===
As of match played 6 June 2026

Appearances and goals by national team and year
National team	Year	Apps	Goals
Portugal	2023	1	0
Portugal	2024	2	0
Portugal	2025	0	0
Portugal	2026	2	0
Total		5	0

== Honours ==
Porto B

- LigaPro: 2015–16

Porto

- Primeira Liga: 2017–18

Olympiacos

- Super League Greece: 2019–20, 2020–21
- Greek Football Cup: 2019–20

Portugal

- UEFA Nations League: 2018–19, 2024–25
- FIFA Confederations Cup third place: 2017

Individual

- UEFA European Under-21 Championship Team of the Tournament: 2015
- Super League Greece Goalkeeper of the Season: 2019–20
- Super League Greece Team of the Season: 2019–20
