= Ioannis Kosti =

Cypriot footballer (born 2000)

Personal information
- Date of birth: 17 March 2000 (age 26)
- Place of birth: Larnaca, Cyprus
- Height: 1.70 m (5 ft 7 in)
- Position: Midfielder

Team information
- Current team: Levadiakos
- Number: 18

Youth career
- Nea Salamina

Senior career*
Years	Team	Apps	(Gls)
2016–2020	Nea Salamina	74	(5)
2020–2024	Olympiacos	0	(0)
2020	→ AEL (loan)	3	(0)
2021	→ Levadiakos (loan)	12	(3)
2021–2024	Olympiacos B	54	(13)
2024–	Levadiakos	73	(7)

International career^{‡}
2017-2018	Cyprus U17	8	(0)
2018–2019	Cyprus U19	12	(0)
2021–2022	Cyprus U21	4	(3)
2019–	Cyprus	25	(1)
- * Club domestic league appearances and goals as of 20 September 2026 ‡ National team caps and goals as of 21:00, 15 November 2026 (UTC)

Ioannis Kosti (Greek: Ιωάννης Κωστή; born 17 March 2000) is a Cypriot professional footballer who plays as a midfielder for Greek Super League club Levadiakos and the Cyprus national team.

== Club career ==
On 15 October 2019, the 19-year-old international Cypriot midfielder signed a five-year contract with Greek giants Olympiacos for an undisclosed fee and will remain in Nea Salamina until the end of the 2019–20 season.

On 5 October 2020, Kosti was loaned to Greek club AEL.

On 10 February 2021, Kosti moved to Super League 2 club Levadiakos, on a loan deal.

== International career ==
He made his Cyprus national football team debut on 8 June 2019 in a Euro 2020 qualifier against Scotland, as a 70th-minute substitute for Matija Špoljarić.

=== International goals ===
As of match played 15 November 2026

Appearances and goals by national team and year
National team	Year	Apps	Goals
Cyprus	2019	8	0
Cyprus	2020	1	0
Cyprus	2021	0	0
Cyprus	2022	0	0
Cyprus	2023	0	0
Cyprus	2024	0	0
Cyprus	2025	8	0
Cyprus	2026	8	1
Total		25	1

Scores and results list Cyprus' goal tally first; the score column indicates the score after each Kosti goal.

List of international goals scored by Ioannis Kosti
No.	Date	Venue	Opponent	Score	Result	Competition
1	5 October 2026	GSP Stadium, Nicosia, Cyprus	Latvia	1–1	2–1	2026–27 UEFA Nations League C
