= Georgios Masouras =

Greek footballer (born 1994)

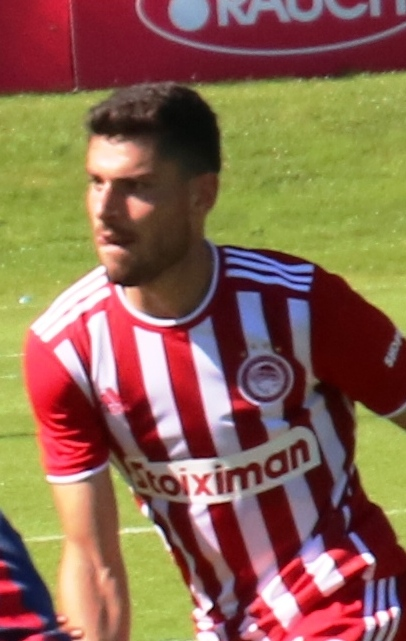
- Masouras in 2022

Personal information
- Full name: Georgios Masouras
- Date of birth: 1 January 1994 (age 32)
- Place of birth: Kechrinia, Amfilochia, Greece
- Height: 1.84 m (6 ft 0 in)
- Position: Winger

Team information
- Current team: Neom
- Number: 7

Youth career
- Omonoia Kechrinias
- Apollon Smyrnis

Senior career*
Years	Team	Apps	(Gls)
2012–2014	Ilisiakos	56	(10)
2014–2019	Panionios	123	(17)
2019–2026	Olympiacos	179	(45)
2025	→ VfL Bochum (loan)	14	(2)
2025–2026	→ Al-Khaleej (loan)	32	(13)
2026–	Neom	10	(0)

International career^{‡}
2015–2017	Greece U21	8	(0)
2018–	Greece	64	(13)
- * Club domestic league appearances and goals as of 30 October 2026 ‡ National team caps and goals as of 16 November 2026

Georgios Masouras (Greek: Γεώργιος Μασούρας, born 1 January 1994) is a Greek professional footballer who plays as a winger for Saudi Pro League club Neom and the Greece national team.

== Club career ==
Masouras started his professional career in Ilisiakos and after he moved to Athenian club Panionios. On 27 April 2016, at the end of the 2015–16 season, he agreed a contract extension for two years with Panionios, until the summer of 2019.

=== Olympiacos ===
Masouras joined Olympiacos on 3 January 2019. He scored his first goal in a 4–0 win at home to AEL on 30 January, and scored three more goals in the 2018–19 Super League season.

On 6 October 2019, he scored his first goal of the 2019–20 Super League season, in a 2–1 away win against Aris. On 15 December 2019, Masouras scored a brace, converting two right-wing crosses from Hillal Soudani in a 5–0 win against Asteras Tripolis at the Theodoros Kolokotronis Stadium. On 18 December 2019, Masouras scored a brace by opening the scoring in the ninth minute as he cleverly turned Konstantinos Kostas Tsimikas’ cross into the net. The 25-year-old then registered his second goal just two minutes later, successfully connecting with Hillal Soudani’s pass to beat the goalkeeper with ease in a 4–1 home win game against AEL. On 1 March 2020, Masouras headed home from a precise Mathieu Valbuena’s cross on the hour mark, in a 2–0 home win game against Panetolikos. On 24 June 2020, Masouras headed the ball beyond Alexandros Paschalakis, with the PAOK goalkeeper just unable to get a hand on it, opening the score in a 2–0 home win Greek Cup game helping his club to reach the 2019–20 Greek Cup final.

On 18 September 2020, in the 2020–21 Super League Greece opener game, the entry of Masouras in the beginning of the second half, scorer of two goals, changed the image of the match and Olympiacos started the championship with a 3–0 home win against Asteras Tripolis. On 8 November 2020, he scored after an assist from Kostas Fortounis sealing a 2–0 away win against OFI. On 12 May 2021, Masouras scored in the first half sealing a 1–0 home win game against rivals PAOK. The game was especially important for Pedro Martins' team, as with this game, Olympiacos win its 46th championship. On 16 May 2021, Masouras scored a brace in a 4–1 away win in the derby against Panathinaikos. It was the biggest away victory of Olympiacos against Panathinaikos in the Super League Greece since 1959–60 season. Masouras became the first player to score two goals so quickly (7', 12 ') in a derby against Panathinaikos. The previous record was from Rafik Djebbour (22', 34'), on 9 December 2012. It was his best season, so far in his career (15 goals, 6 assists).

On 30 September 2021, in a UEFA Europa League group stage, Giorgos Masouras made the difference by scoring twice (63 ′, 68 ′), while he also gave an assist to Tiquinho's goal, to help his team seal an emphatic 3–0 away win against Fenerbahçe. He was voted man of the match for his performance, as well as Player of the week. On 9 February 2022, Masouras with a goal at the last minute of the game and with another in extra time sealed the qualification in the semifinals of the 2021–22 Greek Football Cup against Panetolikos He was voted man of the match for his performance. On 2 March 2022, he scored a brace in three minutes (54', 57') in a 5–1 home win game against Asteras Tripolis

==== Loan to VfL Bochum ====
On 31 January 2025, Masouras joined VfL Bochum in Germany on loan. In his second appearance with Bochum, the Greek midfielder scored his first two goals in Germany within an explosive two minutes and single-handedly led his team to a 2–0 win against Borussia Dortmund.

==== Loan to Al-Khaleej ====
On 13 August 2025, Masouras joined Saudi Pro League club Al-Khaleej on a one-year loan.

=== Neom ===
On 9 August 2026, Masouras signed for Saudi Pro League club Neom.

== International career ==
On 9 November 2018, new Greece coach Angelos Anastasiadis called up Masouras for the matches against Finland and Estonia for UEFA Nations League. "All players dream of someday representing their country and I am happy for this opportunity. It is a child's dream for me", Masouras said.

On 18 November 2018, he made his debut in a 1–0 home loss game against Estonia. On 7 June 2024 he scored in a friendly against Germany to take the lead though Greece lost the game 2–1.

== Career statistics ==
=== Club ===
As of match played 3 April 2026

Appearances and goals by club, season and competition
Club	Season	League			National cup (Note: Includes Greek Football Cup, King's Cup)		Continental		Total	
Club	Season	Division	Apps	Goals	Apps	Goals	Apps	Goals	Apps	Goals
Panionios	2014–15	Super League Greece	14	0	6	1	—		20	1
Panionios	2015–16	Super League Greece	32	1	5	1	—		37	2
Panionios	2016–17	Super League Greece	34	6	3	0	—		37	6
Panionios	2017–18	Super League Greece	29	4	9	3	4 (Note: Appearances in UEFA Europa League)	1	42	8
Panionios	2018–19	Super League Greece	14	6	2	1	—		16	7
Panionios	Total		123	17	25	6	4	1	152	24
Olympiacos	2018–19	Super League Greece	10	4	4	0	2	0	16	4
Olympiacos	2019–20	Super League Greece	32	9	5	1	16 (Note: Twelve appearances and one goal in UEFA Champions League, four appearances in UEFA Europa League)	1	53	11
Olympiacos	2020–21	Super League Greece	31	13	6	1	12 (Note: Eight appearances in UEFA Champions League, four appearances and one goal in UEFA Europa League)	1	49	15
Olympiacos	2021–22	Super League Greece	31	7	3	2	12 (Note: Four appearances and one goal in UEFA Champions League, eight appearances and two goals in UEFA Europa League)	3	46	12
Olympiacos	2022–23	Super League Greece	33	4	4	0	9	1	46	5
Olympiacos	2023–24	Super League Greece	32	7	2	0	18	2	52	9
Olympiacos	2024–25	Super League Greece	10	1	3	0	4 (Note: Four appearances in UEFA Europa League)	0	17	1
Olympiacos	Total		179	45	27	4	73	8	279	57
VfL Bochum	2024–25	Bundesliga	14	2	0	0	—		14	2
Al-Khaleej FC	2025–26	Saudi Pro League	27	12	2	1	—		29	13
Career total			343	77	54	11	77	9	474	96

=== International ===
Scores and results list Greece's goal tally first, score column indicates score after each Masouras goal.

List of international goals scored by Georgios Masouras
No.	Date	Venue	Opponent	Score	Result	Competition
1	8 September 2019	Olympic Stadium, Athens, Greece	Liechtenstein	1–0	1–1	UEFA Euro 2020 qualification
2	6 June 2021	La Rosaleda Stadium, Málaga, Spain	Norway	1–0	2–1	Friendly
3	14 November 2021	Olympic Stadium, Athens, Greece	Kosovo	1–0	1–1	2022 FIFA World Cup qualification
4	27 September 2022	Georgios Kamaras Stadium, Athens, Greece	Northern Ireland	2–1	3–1	2022–23 UEFA Nations League C
5	24 March 2023	Estadio Algarve Stadium, Faro Portugal	Gibraltar	1–0	3–0	UEFA Euro 2024 qualification
6	16 June 2023	Agia Sophia Stadium, Athens, Greece	Republic of Ireland	2–1	2–1	UEFA Euro 2024 qualification
7	10 September 2023	Agia Sophia Stadium, Athens, Greece	Gibraltar	3–0	5–0	UEFA Euro 2024 qualification
8	10 September 2023	Agia Sophia Stadium, Athens, Greece	Gibraltar	5–0	5–0	UEFA Euro 2024 qualification
9	13 October 2023	Aviva Stadium, Dublin, Republic of Ireland	Republic of Ireland	2–0	2–0	UEFA Euro 2024 qualification
10	7 June 2024	Borussia-Park, Mönchengladbach, Germany	Germany	1–0	1–2	Friendly
11	4 June 2026	Strawberry Arena, Solna, Sweden	Sweden	2–2	2–2	Friendly
12	1 October 2026	Toumba Stadium, Thessaloniki, Greece	Netherlands	2–0	2–2	2026–27 UEFA Nations League A
13	16 November 2026	Panthessaliko Stadium, Greece	Serbia	1–0	1–0	2026–27 UEFA Nations League A

== Honours ==
Olympiacos

- Super League Greece: 2019–20, 2020–21, 2021–22
- Greek Football Cup: 2019–20; runner-up: 2020–21
- UEFA Conference League: 2023–24

Individual

- Super League Greek Footballer of the Season: 2020–21, 2021–22
- Super League Greece Team of the Season: 2018–19, 2020–21, 2021–22
- Super League Greece Player of the Month: September 2020, August 2023
