= Pedro Martins (Portuguese footballer) =

Portuguese footballer and manager

Personal information
- Full name: Pedro Rui da Mota Vieira Martins
- Date of birth: 17 July 1970 (age 56)
- Place of birth: Feira, Portugal
- Height: 1.78 m (5 ft 10 in)
- Position: Defensive midfielder

Team information
- Current team: Al-Gharafa (manager)

Youth career
- 1983–1988: Feirense

Senior career*
Years	Team	Apps	(Gls)
1988–1994	Feirense	177	(18)
1994–1995	Vitória Guimarães	31	(5)
1995–1998	Sporting CP	77	(2)
1998–1999	Boavista	7	(0)
1999–2000	Santa Clara	19	(0)
2000–2004	Alverca	47	(0)
Total		358	(25)

International career
1988	Portugal U18	1	(0)
1989	Portugal U21	1	(0)
1997	Portugal	1	(0)

Managerial career
- 2006–2007: União Lamas
- 2007–2009: Lusitânia
- 2009–2010: Espinho
- 2010: Marítimo B
- 2010–2014: Marítimo
- 2014–2016: Rio Ave
- 2016–2018: Vitória Guimarães
- 2018–2022: Olympiacos
- 2022–: Al-Gharafa
- * Club domestic league appearances and goals

Pedro Rui da Mota Vieira Martins (born 17 July 1970) is a Portuguese former professional footballer who played as a defensive midfielder, currently manager of Qatar Stars League club Al-Gharafa.

He amassed Primeira Liga totals of 197 matches and nine goals over ten seasons, in representation of Feirense, Vitória de Guimarães, Sporting CP, Boavista, Santa Clara and Alverca. He added 126 games and eight goals in the Segunda Liga, in a sixteen-year professional career.

Martins started working as a manager in 2006, starting out at União de Lamas and going on to spend four years at Marítimo. He won three Super League Greece titles in charge of Olympiacos, and a double in 2019–20.

== Club career ==
Born in Feira, Santa Maria da Feira, Martins started out at local C.D. Feirense, achieving promotion to the Primeira Liga at the end of the 1988–89 season. He made his debut in the competition on 19 August 1989 at the age of 19, playing the full 90 minutes in a 1–0 home win against C.F. União; he began his career as an attacking midfielder.

In 1994, Martins signed with Vitória de Guimarães. He scored a career-best five goals in his only season, helping to a fourth-place finish and the subsequent qualification for the UEFA Cup.

Martins joined Sporting CP in summer 1995, alongside teammate and namesake Pedro Barbosa. He was relatively used during his three-year tenure at the Estádio José Alvalade, making his first appearance in the UEFA Champions League on 27 August 1997 by featuring the last 18 minutes of the 3–0 home defeat of Beitar Jerusalem F.C. in the second qualifying round.

In the following four years, Martins continued to compete in Portuguese top division, with Boavista FC, C.D. Santa Clara and F.C. Alverca. He retired at the age of 34 after his stint with the latter side, later having assistant manager spells at Vitória de Setúbal, FC Porto and C.F. Os Belenenses.

== International career ==
Martins won one cap for Portugal, coming on as a 60th-minute substitute for Oceano in a 0–0 away draw with Northern Ireland for the 1998 FIFA World Cup qualifiers, on 29 March 1997.

== Coaching career ==
=== Early years and Marítimo ===
Martins' first job as a head coach was with C.F. União de Lamas in 2006, and he continued working in the third tier the following years, with Lusitânia F.C. and S.C. Espinho. For a few months in 2010 he was at the helm of C.S. Marítimo's reserves in the same tier but, in September of that year, he was promoted to the first team in the top flight after the sacking of Mitchell van der Gaag.

Martins led the Madeirans to the fifth position in the 2011–12 campaign, which earned them a place in the Europa League third qualifying round and eventually the group stage. In April 2014, he announced he would leave his post on 30 June.

=== Rio Ave and Vitória Guimarães ===
Subsequently, Martins was appointed at Rio Ave FC. He managed another Europa League qualification in 2015–16 after ranking sixth and, on 17 May 2016, announced he would not continue with the club.

Martins signed a two-year contract with former side Vitória de Guimarães on 23 May 2016. They finished the first season in fourth place and automatically qualified for the Europa League group phase after reaching and losing the final of the Taça de Portugal, to S.L. Benfica. On 18 February 2018, however, he decided to leave due to poor results.

=== Olympiacos ===
On 9 April 2018, Martins replaced the fired Óscar García at the helm of Olympiacos FC, signing a contract until June 2020. In his second full season, he won the club's 45th Super League Greece title, and renewed his deal until 2022. On 12 September 2020, his side won the cup by a single goal against AEK Athens F.C. to secure a double.

On 21 October 2020, after a 1–0 home win against Olympique de Marseille in the Champions League group stage, Martins won his 15th match with the Reds in all European competitions, surpassing the record previously held by Dušan Bajević. The following 11 April, after a 3–1 victory over Panathinaikos FC, the team renewed their domestic supremacy.

Martins committed himself to two more years at the Piraeus-based club on 27 January 2022. On 4 May, his team won their third consecutive title with four games to spare, by winning 2–1 at second-placed PAOK FC.

Martins was relieved of his duties on 1 August 2022, due to a poor streak culminating in a 0–4 home defeat to Maccabi Haifa F.C. which led to the Reds being knocked out of the Champions League's second qualifying round. When he departed, he was the longest-serving manager in the history of Olympiacos in a single tenure, having been in charge for just under 52 months, with Bajević standing at 40; he also held the all-time record for games managed, with 221 to Bajević's 208, while finishing his tenure with 143 victories, just one shy of the Bosnian's.

=== Al-Gharafa ===
In November 2022, Martins signed as manager of Al-Gharafa SC in the Qatar Stars League.

== Personal life ==
Martins was the youngest of three boys. His father and one brother died in the mid-2000s from heart problems and he was prescribed medication to control his own condition. His father owned a garage and his mother had a general store; he set up his own gift shop at aged 18 with his girlfriend Lina, whom he married and had two children.

In June 2006, Martins was held in prison by Spanish authorities for 35 days on suspicion of falsifying documents, before posting bail of €30,000. He had gone to Jerez de la Frontera to open a bank account on behalf of two business contacts.

== Managerial statistics ==
As of match played 22 October 2026

Managerial record by team and tenure
Team	Nat	From	To	Record								Ref
Team	Nat	From	To	G	W	D	L	GF	GA	GD	Win %	Ref
União Lamas	(Portugal)	13 November 2006	19 March 2007	13	3	1	9	10	28	−18	23.08	
Lusitânia	(Portugal)	1 October 2007	2 June 2009	57	20	14	23	65	78	−13	35.09	
Espinho	(Portugal)	2 June 2009	18 January 2010	16	6	3	7	24	21	+3	37.50	
Marítimo B	(Portugal)	23 March 2010	14 September 2010	8	6	2	0	12	1	+11	75.00	
Marítimo	(Portugal)	14 September 2010	15 May 2014	154	61	43	50	194	193	+1	39.61	
Rio Ave	(Portugal)	22 May 2014	17 May 2016	101	36	31	34	118	118	+0	35.64	
Vitória Guimarães	(Portugal)	23 May 2016	18 February 2018	80	36	15	29	113	120	−7	45.00	
Olympiacos	(Greece)	7 May 2018	1 August 2022	221	143	42	36	413	173	+240	64.71	
Al-Gharafa	(Qatar)	5 November 2022	Present	143	59	29	55	236	253	−17	41.26	
Total				793	370	180	243	1,185	985	+200	46.66	—

== Honours ==
=== Player ===
Sporting CP

- Supertaça Cândido de Oliveira: 1995

=== Manager ===
Rio Ave

- Supertaça Cândido de Oliveira runner-up: 2014

Vitória de Guimarães

- Taça de Portugal runner-up: 2016–17
- Supertaça Cândido de Oliveira runner-up: 2017

Olympiacos

- Super League Greece: 2019–20, 2020–21, 2021–22
- Greek Football Cup: 2019–20; runner-up: 2020–21

Al-Gharafa

- Amir of Qatar Cup: 2025, 2026

Individual

- Super League Greece Manager of the Season: 2019–20, 2020–21
- Qatar Stars League Manager of the Month: October/November 2023
