= 2015 UEFA European Under-17 Championship squads =

Football tournament squads

The following is a list of squads for each national team that competed at the 2015 UEFA European Under-17 Championship in Bulgaria. Each national team had to submit a squad of 18 players born after 1 January 1998.

Players in boldface have been capped at full international level at some point in their career.

== Group A ==
=== Austria ===
Head coach: (Austria) Manfred Zsak

No.	Pos.	Player	Date of birth (age)	Caps	Goals	Club
1	GK	Fabian Ehmann	28 August 1998 (aged 16)			(Austrian Football Association) Sturm Graz
4	DF	Boris Basara	22 February 1998 (aged 17)			(Austrian Football Association) Admira Wacker Mödling
5	DF	Raphael Nageler	18 May 1998 (aged 16)			(Austrian Football Association) AKA WAC Pellets
6	DF	Aleksandar Skrbic	29 October 1998 (aged 16)			(Austrian Football Association) Rapid Wien
7	MF	Albin Ramadani	15 January 1998 (aged 17)			(Austrian Football Association) SV Ried Amateure/Neuhofen
8	MF	**Kevin Danso**	19 September 1998 (aged 16)			(German Football Association) FC Augsburg
9	FW	Arnel Jakupovic	29 May 1998 (aged 16)			(Austrian Football Association) Austria Wien
10	MF	Samuel Oppong	12 May 1998 (aged 16)			(Austrian Football Association) Rapid Wien
12	FW	Oliver Filip	15 January 1998 (aged 17)			(Austrian Football Association) Red Bull Salzburg
13	MF	Anes Omerovic	20 May 1998 (aged 16)			(The Football Association) Aston Villa
14	MF	**Maximilian Wöber**	4 February 1998 (aged 17)			(Austrian Football Association) Rapid Wien
15	DF	Paul Sahanek	8 September 1998 (aged 16)			(Austrian Football Association) Rapid Wien
16	DF	Jan Heilmann	16 March 1998 (aged 17)			(Austrian Football Association) Rapid Wien
17	DF	Niklas Kölbl	3 April 1998 (aged 17)			(Austrian Football Association) SV Ried
18	DF	Florian Prirsch	11 September 1998 (aged 16)			(Austrian Football Association) Dornbirn
19	FW	Patrick Schmidt	22 July 1998 (aged 16)			(Austrian Football Association) Admira Wacker Mödling
20	MF	**Sandi Lovrić**	28 March 1998 (aged 17)			(Austrian Football Association) Sturm Graz
21	GK	Dominik Krischke	21 May 1998 (aged 16)			(Austrian Football Association) Austria Wien

=== Bulgaria ===
Head coach: (Bulgaria) Aleksandar Dimitrov

No.	Pos.	Player	Date of birth (age)	Caps	Goals	Club
1	GK	**Daniel Naumov**	29 March 1998 (aged 17)			(Bulgarian Football Union) Ludogorets Razgrad
2	DF	Dimitar Savov	9 September 1998 (aged 16)			(Bulgarian Football Union) Slavia Sofia
3	DF	Danail Ivanov	7 August 1998 (aged 16)			(Bulgarian Football Union) DIT Sofia
4	MF	Radoslav Dimitrov	3 July 1998 (aged 16)			(Bulgarian Football Union) CSKA Sofia
5	DF	Kristiyan Slavov	23 May 1998 (aged 16)			(Bulgarian Football Union) CSKA Sofia
6	FW	**Georgi Rusev**	2 July 1998 (aged 16)			(Bulgarian Football Union) Dit Sofia
7	MF	Aleks Borimirov	13 May 1998 (aged 16)			(Bulgarian Football Union) Levski Sofia
8	MF	Georgi Yanev	4 January 1998 (aged 17)			(Bulgarian Football Union) Levski Sofia
9	FW	Valentin Yoskov	5 June 1998 (aged 16)			(Bulgarian Football Union) Cherno More Varna
10	MF	**Iliyan Stefanov**	20 September 1998 (aged 16)			(Bulgarian Football Union) Levski Sofia
11	FW	**Svetoslav Kovachev**	14 March 1998 (aged 17)			(Bulgarian Football Union) Ludogorets Razgrad
12	GK	Dimitar Sheytanov	5 May 1998 (aged 17)			(Bulgarian Football Union) Levski Sofia
13	MF	**Asen Chandarov**	13 November 1998 (aged 16)			(Bulgarian Football Union) Dit Sofia
14	DF	**Mateo Stamatov**	22 March 1999 (aged 16)			(Royal Spanish Football Federation) Espanyol
15	DF	**Petko Hristov**	1 March 1999 (aged 16)			(Bulgarian Football Union) Slavia Sofia
16	MF	Georgi Chukalov	25 February 1998 (aged 17)			(Bulgarian Football Union) Lokomotiv Plovdiv
17	DF	Pavel Golovodov	28 June 1998 (aged 16)			(Bulgarian Football Union) CSKA Sofia
18	FW	**Tonislav Yordanov**	27 November 1998 (aged 16)			(Bulgarian Football Union) Litex Lovech

=== Croatia ===
Head coach: Dario Bašić

No.	Pos.	Player	Date of birth (age)	Caps	Goals	Club
1	GK	Adrian Šemper	12 January 1998 (aged 17)			(Croatian Football Federation) Dinamo Zagreb
2	DF	Matej Hudećek	27 December 1998 (aged 16)			(Croatian Football Federation) Dinamo Zagreb
3	DF	**Borna Sosa**	21 January 1998 (aged 17)			(Croatian Football Federation) Dinamo Zagreb
4	DF	**Martin Erlić**	24 January 1998 (aged 17)			(Italian Football Federation) Parma
5	DF	Branimir Kalaica	1 June 1998 (aged 16)			(Croatian Football Federation) Dinamo Zagreb
6	DF	Vinko Soldo	15 February 1998 (aged 17)			(Croatian Football Federation) Dinamo Zagreb
7	MF	**Josip Brekalo**	23 June 1998 (aged 16)			(Croatian Football Federation) Dinamo Zagreb
8	MF	Neven Đurasek	15 August 1998 (aged 16)			(Croatian Football Federation) Varaždin
9	FW	Karlo Majić	3 March 1998 (aged 17)			(Croatian Football Federation) Dinamo Zagreb
10	MF	**Nikola Moro**	12 March 1998 (aged 17)			(Croatian Football Federation) Dinamo Zagreb
11	MF	Davor Lovren	3 October 1998 (aged 16)			(Croatian Football Federation) Dinamo Zagreb
12	GK	Ivan Nevistić	31 July 1998 (aged 16)			(Croatian Football Federation) Osijek
13	DF	Mihael Briški	2 January 1999 (aged 16)			(Croatian Football Federation) Dinamo Zagreb
14	MF	Dino Halilović	8 February 1998 (aged 17)			(Croatian Football Federation) Dinamo Zagreb
15	MF	Saša Urošević	26 January 1999 (aged 16)			(Croatian Football Federation) Istra 1961
16	DF	Marko Gjira	5 May 1999 (aged 16)			(Croatian Football Federation) Dinamo Zagreb
17	FW	Matko Babić	28 July 1998 (aged 16)			(Croatian Football Federation) Lokomotiva
18	FW	Adrian Blečić	8 March 1998 (aged 17)			(Croatian Football Federation) Dinamo Zagreb
19	MF	Adrian Zenko	4 April 1998 (aged 17)			(Croatian Football Federation) Dinamo Zagreb

1. Adrian Zenko was called up during the tournament due to an injury to Martin Erlić.

=== Spain ===
Head coach: (Spain) Santiago Denia

No.	Pos.	Player	Date of birth (age)	Caps	Goals	Club
1	GK	Alejandro Santomé	14 April 1998 (aged 17)			(Royal Spanish Football Federation) Atlético Madrid
2	DF	José María Amo	9 April 1998 (aged 17)			(Royal Spanish Football Federation) Sevilla
3	DF	**Marc Cucurella**	22 July 1998 (aged 16)			(Royal Spanish Football Federation) Barcelona
4	DF	Álex Martín	25 January 1998 (aged 17)			(Royal Spanish Football Federation) Real Madrid
5	DF	Ismael Aizpiri	7 February 1998 (aged 17)			(Royal Spanish Football Federation) Sporting Gijón
6	MF	Carles Aleñá	5 January 1998 (aged 17)			(Royal Spanish Football Federation) Barcelona
7	FW	**Dani Olmo**	7 May 1998 (aged 16)			(Croatian Football Federation) Dinamo Zagreb
8	MF	Fran Villalba	11 May 1998 (aged 16)			(Royal Spanish Football Federation) Valencia
9	FW	Kuki Zalazar	5 May 1998 (aged 17)			(Royal Spanish Football Federation) Málaga
10	FW	Carles Pérez	16 February 1998 (aged 17)			(Royal Spanish Football Federation) Barcelona
11	MF	**Óscar**	28 June 1998 (aged 16)			(Royal Spanish Football Federation) Real Madrid
12	DF	Jon Sillero	24 May 1998 (aged 16)			(Royal Spanish Football Federation) Athletic Bilbao
13	GK	Iñaki Peña	2 March 1999 (aged 16)			(Royal Spanish Football Federation) Barcelona
14	MF	Pepelu	11 August 1998 (aged 16)			(Royal Spanish Football Federation) Levante
15	MF	Toni Moya	20 March 1998 (aged 17)			(Royal Spanish Football Federation) Atlético Madrid
16	DF	Dani Morer	5 February 1998 (aged 17)			(Royal Spanish Football Federation) Barcelona
17	FW	Rubén Fernández	7 April 1998 (aged 17)			(Royal Spanish Football Federation) Atlético Madrid
19	FW	Fran Navarro	3 February 1998 (aged 17)			(Royal Spanish Football Federation) Valencia

== Group B ==
=== Belgium ===
Head coach: (Belgium) Bob Browaeys

No.	Pos.	Player	Date of birth (age)	Caps	Goals	Club
1	GK	Jens Teunckens	30 January 1998 (aged 17)			(Royal Belgian Football Association) Club Brugge
2	DF	Kino Delorge	5 January 1998 (aged 17)			(Royal Belgian Football Association) Genk
3	MF	Rubin Seigers	11 January 1998 (aged 17)			(Royal Belgian Football Association) Genk
4	DF	**Wout Faes**	3 April 1998 (aged 17)			(Royal Belgian Football Association) Anderlecht
5	DF	Christophe Janssens	9 March 1998 (aged 17)			(Royal Belgian Football Association) Club Brugge
6	MF	Matisse Thuys	24 January 1998 (aged 17)			(Royal Belgian Football Association) Genk
7	MF	Ismail Azzaoui	6 January 1998 (aged 17)			(The Football Association) Tottenham Hotspur
8	MF	Alper Ademoglu	10 April 1998 (aged 17)			(Royal Belgian Football Association) Anderlecht
9	FW	Dennis Van Vaerenbergh	26 June 1998 (aged 16)			(Royal Belgian Football Association) Club Brugge
10	MF	**Orel Mangala**	18 March 1998 (aged 17)			(Royal Belgian Football Association) Anderlecht
11	MF	Lennerd Daneels	10 April 1998 (aged 17)			(Royal Dutch Football Association) PSV Eindhoven
12	GK	Gaëtan Coucke	3 November 1998 (aged 16)			(Royal Belgian Football Association) Genk
13	DF	Dries Caignau	8 January 1998 (aged 17)			(Royal Belgian Football Association) Gent
14	DF	Siebe Horemans	2 June 1998 (aged 16)			(Royal Belgian Football Association) Gent
15	MF	Dante Rigo	11 December 1998 (aged 16)			(Royal Dutch Football Association) PSV Eindhoven
16	FW	Nelson Azevedo-Janelas	12 February 1998 (aged 17)			(Royal Belgian Football Association) Anderlecht
17	FW	Jorn Vancamp	28 October 1998 (aged 16)			(Royal Belgian Football Association) Anderlecht
18	MF	Matthias Verreth	20 February 1998 (aged 17)			(Royal Dutch Football Association) PSV Eindhoven

=== Czech Republic ===
Head coach: (Czech Republic) Václav Černý

No.	Pos.	Player	Date of birth (age)	Caps	Goals	Club
1	GK	Filip Truksa	3 July 1998 (aged 16)			(Football Association of the Czech Republic) Mladá Boleslav
2	DF	Denis Granečný	7 September 1998 (aged 16)			(Football Association of the Czech Republic) Baník Ostrava
3	DF	Libor Holík	12 May 1998 (aged 16)			(Football Association of the Czech Republic) Slovácko
4	DF	Marek Richter	23 May 1998 (aged 16)			(Football Association of the Czech Republic) Teplice
5	DF	Daniel Köstl	23 May 1998 (aged 16)			(Football Association of the Czech Republic) Sparta Prague
6	MF	**Michal Sadílek**	31 May 1999 (aged 15)			(Football Association of the Czech Republic) Slovácko
7	FW	Antonín Vaníček	22 April 1998 (aged 17)			(Football Association of the Czech Republic) Bohemians 1905
8	FW	**Ondřej Lingr**	7 October 1998 (aged 16)			(Football Association of the Czech Republic) Karviná
9	MF	Marcel Čermák	25 November 1998 (aged 16)			(Football Association of the Czech Republic) Slavia Prague
10	FW	Ondřej Šašinka	21 March 1998 (aged 17)			(Football Association of the Czech Republic) Baník Ostrava
11	MF	Dominik Breda	27 February 1998 (aged 17)			(Football Association of the Czech Republic) Hradec Králové
13	MF	**Alex Král**	19 May 1998 (aged 16)			(Football Association of the Czech Republic) Slavia Prague
15	DF	Daniel Souček	18 July 1998 (aged 16)			(Football Association of the Czech Republic) Slavia Prague
16	GK	**Martin Jedlička**	24 January 1998 (aged 17)			(Football Association of the Czech Republic) Příbram
17	DF	Tomáš Balvín	13 May 1998 (aged 16)			(Football Association of the Czech Republic) Sparta Prague
18	MF	Ondřej Žežulka	25 September 1998 (aged 16)			(Football Association of the Czech Republic) Slavia Prague
19	FW	Daniel Turyna	26 February 1998 (aged 17)			(Football Association of the Czech Republic) Sparta Prague
20	DF	**Matěj Chaluš**	2 February 1998 (aged 17)			(Football Association of the Czech Republic) Bohemians 1905

=== Germany ===
Head coach: (Germany) Christian Wück

No.	Pos.	Player	Date of birth (age)	Caps	Goals	Club
1	GK	Constantin Frommann	27 May 1998 (aged 16)			(German Football Association) SC Freiburg
2	MF	Felix Passlack	29 May 1998 (aged 16)			(German Football Association) Borussia Dortmund
3	DF	**Dženis Burnić**	22 May 1998 (aged 16)			(German Football Association) VfB Stuttgart
4	MF	Gökhan Gül	17 July 1998 (aged 16)			(German Football Association) Fortuna Düsseldorf
5	DF	Erdinc Karakas	23 March 1998 (aged 17)			(German Football Association) Schalke 04
6	DF	**Joel Abu Hanna**	22 January 1998 (aged 17)			(German Football Association) Bayer Leverkusen
7	MF	Dennis Geiger	10 June 1998 (aged 16)			(German Football Association) 1899 Hoffenheim
8	MF	Niklas Dorsch	15 January 1998 (aged 17)			(German Football Association) Bayern Munich
9	FW	Johannes Eggestein	8 May 1998 (aged 16)			(German Football Association) Werder Bremen
10	MF	Niklas Schmidt	1 March 1998 (aged 17)			(German Football Association) Werder Bremen
11	FW	Mats Köhlert	2 May 1998 (aged 17)			(German Football Association) Hamburger SV
12	GK	Markus Schubert	12 June 1998 (aged 16)			(German Football Association) Dynamo Dresden
13	DF	Daniel Nesseler	15 March 1998 (aged 17)			(German Football Association) Bayer Leverkusen
14	MF	Görkem Saglam	11 April 1998 (aged 17)			(German Football Association) VfL Bochum
15	MF	**Salih Özcan**	11 January 1998 (aged 17)			(German Football Association) 1. FC Köln
16	FW	Janni Serra	13 March 1998 (aged 17)			(German Football Association) Borussia Dortmund
17	DF	Enes Akyol	16 February 1998 (aged 17)			(German Football Association) Hertha BSC
18	DF	Jonas Busam	3 May 1998 (aged 17)			(German Football Association) SC Freiburg
20	MF	**Vitaly Janelt**^{1}	10 May 1998 (aged 16)			(German Football Association) RB Leipzig

1. Vitaly Janelt was called up during the tournament due to an injury to Niklas Dorsch.

=== Slovenia ===
Head coach: (Slovenia) Igor Benedejčič

No.	Pos.	Player	Date of birth (age)	Caps	Goals	Club
1	GK	Rok Vodišek	5 December 1998 (aged 16)			(Football Association of Slovenia) Olimpija
2	DF	Sandi Čoralič	12 February 1998 (aged 17)			(Football Association of Slovenia) Olimpija
3	DF	**Sven Karić**	7 March 1998 (aged 17)			(Football Association of Slovenia) Maribor
4	DF	Sandi Ogrinec	5 June 1998 (aged 16)			(Football Association of Slovenia) Bravo
5	FW	Oskar Cvjetičanin	26 April 1998 (aged 17)			(The Football Association) Southampton
6	DF	Luka Guček	29 January 1998 (aged 17)			(Football Association of Slovenia) Krško
7	FW	Jakob Novak	4 March 1998 (aged 17)			(Football Association of Slovenia) Olimpija
8	MF	**Dejan Petrovič**	12 January 1998 (aged 17)			(Football Association of Slovenia) Aluminij
9	FW	**Jan Mlakar**	23 October 1998 (aged 16)			(Italian Football Federation) Fiorentina
10	MF	Vitja Valenčič	12 March 1999 (aged 16)			(Football Association of Slovenia) Olimpija
11	FW	**Timi Elšnik**	29 April 1998 (aged 17)			(Football Association of Slovenia) Aluminij
12	GK	**Igor Vekić**	6 May 1998 (aged 17)			(Football Association of Slovenia) Bravo
13	FW	Gaber Petrić	11 May 1998 (aged 16)			(Football Association of Slovenia) Domžale
14	FW	Kristjan Sredojevič	21 June 1998 (aged 16)			(Football Association of Slovenia) Triglav
16	MF	Janez Pišek	4 May 1998 (aged 17)			(Football Association of Slovenia) Celje
17	DF	Matija Rom	1 November 1998 (aged 16)			(Football Association of Slovenia) Domžale
18	DF	Rok Bužinel	28 March 1998 (aged 17)			(Football Association of Slovenia) Gorica
20	FW	Kevin Žižek	21 June 1998 (aged 16)			(Football Association of Slovenia) Bravo

== Group C ==
=== France ===
Head coach: (France) Jean-Claude Giuntini

No.	Pos.	Player	Date of birth (age)	Caps	Goals	Club
1	GK	**Luca Zidane**	13 May 1998 (aged 16)			(Royal Spanish Football Federation) Real Madrid
2	DF	Alec Georgen	17 September 1998 (aged 16)			(French Football Federation) Paris Saint-Germain
3	DF	Faitout Maouassa	6 July 1998 (aged 16)			(French Football Federation) Nancy
4	DF	**Dayot Upamecano**	27 October 1998 (aged 16)			(French Football Federation) Valenciennes
5	DF	Mamadou Doucouré	21 May 1998 (aged 16)			(French Football Federation) Paris Saint-Germain
6	MF	Jean-Victor Makengo	12 June 1998 (aged 16)			(French Football Federation) Caen
7	FW	Odsonne Édouard	16 January 1998 (aged 17)			(French Football Federation) Paris Saint-Germain
8	MF	Timothé Cognat	25 January 1998 (aged 17)			(French Football Federation) Lyon
9	FW	Maxime Pélican	12 May 1998 (aged 16)			(French Football Federation) Toulouse
10	MF	Bilal Boutobba	29 August 1998 (aged 16)			(French Football Federation) Marseille
11	FW	**Jonathan Ikoné**	2 May 1998 (aged 17)			(French Football Federation) Paris Saint-Germain
12	MF	Jeff Reine-Adélaïde	17 January 1998 (aged 17)			(French Football Federation) Lens
13	FW	Jordan Rambaud	16 March 1998 (aged 17)			(French Football Federation) Guingamp
14	DF	**Issa Samba**	29 January 1998 (aged 17)			(French Football Federation) Auxerre
15	DF	Bradley Danger	29 January 1998 (aged 17)			(French Football Federation) Le Havre
16	GK	Numan Bostan	31 January 1998 (aged 17)			(French Football Federation) Toulouse
17	MF	Nicolas Janvier	11 August 1998 (aged 16)			(French Football Federation) Rennes
18	MF	Jean Ruiz	6 April 1998 (aged 17)			(French Football Federation) Sochaux

=== Greece ===
Head coach: (Greece) Vassilis Georgopoulos

No.	Pos.	Player	Date of birth (age)	Caps	Goals	Club
1	GK	Chrysostomos Iakovidis	30 July 1998 (aged 16)			(Hellenic Football Federation) Aris
2	DF	Polykarpos Liaptsis	12 March 1998 (aged 17)			(Hellenic Football Federation) PAOK
3	DF	Alexandros Katranis	4 May 1998 (aged 17)			(Hellenic Football Federation) Atromitos
4	DF	Stefanos Evangelou	12 May 1998 (aged 16)			(Hellenic Football Federation) Panionios
5	DF	**Dimitris Nikolaou**	13 August 1998 (aged 16)			(Hellenic Football Federation) Olympiacos
6	MF	Spyros Natsos	9 June 1998 (aged 16)			(Hellenic Football Federation) Atromitos
7	FW	**Dimitrios Limnios**	27 May 1998 (aged 16)			(Hellenic Football Federation) Atromitos
8	MF	Stathis Lamprou	20 September 1998 (aged 16)			(Hellenic Football Federation) Olympiacos
9	FW	Ioannis Tsingas	18 May 1999 (aged 15)			(German Football Association) Schalke 04
10	MF	Theodoros Mingos	6 February 1998 (aged 17)			(Hellenic Football Federation) Panathinaikos
11	FW	Kostas Kirtzialidis	23 March 1998 (aged 17)			(Hellenic Football Federation) Olympiacos
12	GK	Marios Siampanis	28 September 1999 (aged 15)			(Hellenic Football Federation) PAOK
14	MF	Nikos Karamitos	14 July 1998 (aged 16)			(Hellenic Football Federation) Asteras Tripolis
15	MF	**Vangelis Pavlidis**	21 November 1998 (aged 16)			(German Football Association) VfL Bochum
16	DF	**Panagiotis Retsos**	9 August 1998 (aged 16)			(Hellenic Football Federation) Olympiacos
17	DF	Antonis Fouasis	13 June 1998 (aged 16)			(Hellenic Football Federation) Olympiacos
18	DF	Stergios Dodontsakis	23 November 1998 (aged 16)			(Hellenic Football Federation) PAOK
19	MF	Konstantinos Chatzidimpas	12 May 1998 (aged 16)			(Hellenic Football Federation) PAOK

=== Russia ===
Head coach: (Russia) Mikhail Galaktionov

No.	Pos.	Player	Date of birth (age)	Caps	Goals	Club
1	GK	Denis Adamov	20 February 1998 (aged 17)			(Russian Football Union) Krasnodar
2	DF	Andrei Kudryavtsev	6 November 1998 (aged 16)			(Russian Football Union) DYuSSh Smena-Zenit
3	DF	Konstantin Kotov	25 June 1998 (aged 16)			(Russian Football Union) Zenit Saint Petersburg
4	DF	Nikita Kalugin	12 March 1998 (aged 17)			(Russian Football Union) Dynamo Moscow
5	DF	Aleksei Tatayev	8 October 1998 (aged 16)			(Russian Football Union) Krasnodar
6	MF	Ivan Galanin	5 June 1998 (aged 16)			(Russian Football Union) Lokomotiv Moscow
7	DF	**Danil Krugovoy**	28 May 1998 (aged 16)			(Russian Football Union) Zenit Saint Petersburg
8	MF	Georgi Makhatadze	26 March 1998 (aged 17)			(Russian Football Union) Lokomotiv Moscow
9	FW	Artyom Galadzhan	22 May 1998 (aged 16)			(Russian Football Union) Lokomotiv Moscow
10	MF	Boris Tsygankov	17 April 1998 (aged 17)			(Russian Football Union) Spartak Moscow
11	DF	Aleksandr Lomovitskiy	27 January 1998 (aged 17)			(Russian Football Union) Spartak Moscow
12	GK	**Aleksandr Maksimenko**	19 March 1998 (aged 17)			(Russian Football Union) Spartak Moscow
13	FW	Yegor Denisov	6 February 1998 (aged 17)			(Russian Football Union) Zenit Saint Petersburg
14	MF	Artyom Selyukov	16 March 1998 (aged 17)			(Russian Football Union) Chertanovo
15	FW	Vladislav Bragin	25 January 1998 (aged 17)			(Russian Football Union) Krasnodar
16	MF	Dmitri Pletnyov	16 January 1998 (aged 17)			(Russian Football Union) Zenit Saint Petersburg
17	MF	Mikhail Lysov	29 January 1998 (aged 17)			(Russian Football Union) Lokomotiv Moscow
18	DF	Amir Gavrilov	13 June 1998 (aged 16)			(Russian Football Union) Rubin Kazan

=== Scotland ===
Head coach: (Scotland) Scot Gemmill

No.	Pos.	Player	Date of birth (age)	Caps	Goals	Club
1	GK	Robby McCrorie	18 March 1998 (aged 17)			(Scottish Football Association) Rangers
2	DF	Mark Finlayson	30 May 1998 (aged 16)			(Scottish Football Association) Falkirk
3	DF	**Ross McCrorie**	18 March 1998 (aged 17)			(Scottish Football Association) Rangers
4	DF	Tom McIntyre	6 November 1998 (aged 16)			(The Football Association) Reading
5	DF	Daniel Harvie	14 July 1998 (aged 16)			(Scottish Football Association) Aberdeen
6	MF	Liam Burt	1 February 1999 (aged 16)			(Scottish Football Association) Rangers
7	FW	Jack Aitchison	5 March 2000 (aged 15)			(Scottish Football Association) Celtic
8	MF	Mark Hill	10 July 1998 (aged 16)			(Scottish Football Association) Celtic
9	FW	Calvin Miller	9 January 1998 (aged 17)			(Scottish Football Association) Celtic
10	MF	Frank Ross	18 February 1998 (aged 17)			(Scottish Football Association) Aberdeen
11	FW	Zak Rudden	6 February 2000 (aged 15)			(Scottish Football Association) Rangers
12	GK	**Ross Doohan**	29 March 1998 (aged 17)			(Scottish Football Association) Celtic
13	MF	Iain Wilson	1 June 1998 (aged 16)			(Scottish Football Association) Kilmarnock
14	MF	Regan Hendry	21 January 1998 (aged 17)			(Scottish Football Association) Celtic
15	MF	Lewis Morrison	12 March 1999 (aged 16)			(Scottish Football Association) Kilmarnock
16	MF	**Harry Souttar**	22 October 1998 (aged 16)			(Scottish Football Association) Dundee United
17	MF	Glenn Middleton	1 October 1998 (aged 16)			(The Football Association) Norwich City
18	DF	Daniel Higgins	8 April 1998 (aged 17)			(Scottish Football Association) Celtic

== Group D ==
=== England ===
Head coach: (England) John Peacock

No.	Pos.	Player	Date of birth (age)	Caps	Goals	Club
1	GK	Paul Woolston	14 August 1998 (aged 16)			(The Football Association) Newcastle United
2	DF	James Yates	3 April 1998 (aged 17)			(The Football Association) Everton
3	DF	**Jay Dasilva**	22 April 1998 (aged 17)			(The Football Association) Chelsea
4	MF	Tom Davies	30 June 1998 (aged 16)			(The Football Association) Everton
6	DF	Danny Collinge	9 April 1998 (aged 17)			(German Football Association) VfB Stuttgart
5	DF	Reece Oxford	16 December 1998 (aged 16)			(The Football Association) West Ham United
7	MF	Nathan Holland	19 June 1998 (aged 16)			(The Football Association) Everton
8	MF	Daniel Wright	4 January 1998 (aged 17)			(The Football Association) Sunderland
9	FW	**Ike Ugbo**	12 September 1998 (aged 16)			(The Football Association) Chelsea
10	MF	**Marcus Edwards**	20 December 1998 (aged 16)			(The Football Association) Tottenham Hotspur
11	MF	Chris Willock	31 January 1998 (aged 17)			(The Football Association) Arsenal
12	DF	Tayo Edun	14 May 1998 (aged 16)			(The Football Association) Fulham
13	GK	Will Huffer	30 October 1998 (aged 16)			(The Football Association) Leeds United
14	MF	**Trent Alexander-Arnold**	7 October 1998 (aged 16)			(The Football Association) Liverpool
15	DF	**Easah Suliman**	26 January 1998 (aged 17)			(The Football Association) Aston Villa
16	FW	**Stephy Mavididi**	31 May 1998 (aged 16)			(The Football Association) Arsenal
17	FW	Layton Ndukwu	24 April 1998 (aged 17)			(The Football Association) Leicester City
18	MF	Herbie Kane	23 November 1998 (aged 16)			(The Football Association) Liverpool

=== Italy ===
Head coach: (Italy) Bruno Tedino

No.	Pos.	Player	Date of birth (age)	Caps	Goals	Club
1	GK	**Gianluigi Donnarumma**	25 February 1999 (aged 16)			(Italian Football Federation) Milan
2	DF	Giuseppe Scalera	26 January 1998 (aged 17)			(Italian Football Federation) Bari
3	DF	Federico Giraudo	11 August 1998 (aged 16)			(Italian Football Federation) Torino
4	DF	Alessandro Mattioli	13 February 1998 (aged 17)			(Italian Football Federation) Inter Milan
5	DF	Andrea Malberti	10 April 1998 (aged 17)			(Italian Football Federation) Milan
6	DF	Andrés Llamas	7 May 1998 (aged 16)			(Italian Football Federation) Milan
7	DF	Luca Coccolo	23 February 1998 (aged 17)			(Italian Football Federation) Juventus
8	MF	Edoardo Degl'Innocenti	7 August 1998 (aged 16)			(Italian Football Federation) Fiorentina
9	MF	Filippo Melegoni	18 February 1999 (aged 16)			(Italian Football Federation) Atalanta
10	MF	**Manuel Locatelli**	8 January 1998 (aged 17)			(Italian Football Federation) Milan
11	MF	Mattia El Hilali	20 January 1998 (aged 17)			(Italian Football Federation) Milan
12	GK	Tommaso Cucchietti	24 January 1998 (aged 17)			(Italian Football Federation) Torino
13	MF	Luca Matarese	16 April 1998 (aged 17)			(Italian Football Federation) Genoa
14	MF	Alessandro Eleuteri	8 June 1998 (aged 16)			(Italian Football Federation) Juventus
15	FW	Simone Lo Faso	18 February 1998 (aged 17)			(Italian Football Federation) Palermo
16	FW	**Patrick Cutrone**	3 January 1998 (aged 17)			(Italian Football Federation) Milan
17	FW	**Gianluca Scamacca**	1 January 1999 (aged 16)			(Royal Dutch Football Association) PSV Eindhoven
18	FW	Simone Mazzocchi	17 August 1998 (aged 16)			(Italian Football Federation) Atalanta

=== Netherlands ===
Head coach: (Netherlands) Maarten Stekelenburg

No.	Pos.	Player	Date of birth (age)	Caps	Goals	Club
1	GK	**Justin Bijlow**	22 January 1998 (aged 17)			(Royal Dutch Football Association) Feyenoord
2	DF	**Giovanni Troupée**	20 March 1998 (aged 17)			(Royal Dutch Football Association) Utrecht
3	DF	**Timothy Fosu-Mensah**	2 January 1998 (aged 17)			(The Football Association) Manchester United
4	DF	Mats Knoester	19 November 1998 (aged 16)			(Royal Dutch Football Association) Feyenoord
5	DF	Rick van Drongelen	20 December 1998 (aged 16)			(Royal Dutch Football Association) Sparta Rotterdam
6	MF	Reda Boultam	3 March 1998 (aged 17)			(Royal Dutch Football Association) Ajax
7	FW	Rashaan Fernandes	29 July 1998 (aged 16)			(Royal Dutch Football Association) Feyenoord
8	MF	Carel Eiting	11 February 1998 (aged 17)			(Royal Dutch Football Association) Ajax
9	FW	Nigel Robertha	13 February 1998 (aged 17)			(Royal Dutch Football Association) Feyenoord
10	MF	Teun Bijleveld	27 May 1998 (aged 16)			(Royal Dutch Football Association) AZ
11	FW	**Javairô Dilrosun**	22 June 1998 (aged 16)			(The Football Association) Manchester City
12	MF	Dani de Wit	28 January 1998 (aged 17)			(Royal Dutch Football Association) Ajax
13	DF	**Sherel Floranus**	23 August 1998 (aged 16)			(Royal Dutch Football Association) Sparta Rotterdam
14	DF	**Matthijs de Ligt**	12 August 1999 (aged 15)			(Royal Dutch Football Association) Ajax
15	MF	Mink Peeters	28 May 1998 (aged 16)			(Royal Spanish Football Federation) Real Madrid
16	GK	Thijmen Nijhuis	25 July 1998 (aged 16)			(Royal Dutch Football Association) Utrecht
17	FW	**Jay-Roy Grot**	13 March 1998 (aged 17)			(Royal Dutch Football Association) NEC/FC Oss
18	FW	**Donyell Malen**	19 January 1999 (aged 16)			(Royal Dutch Football Association) Ajax

=== Republic of Ireland ===
Head coach: (Republic of Ireland) Tom Mohan

No.	Pos.	Player	Date of birth (age)	Caps	Goals	Club
1	GK	**Caoimhin Kelleher**	23 November 1998 (aged 16)			(The Football Association) Liverpool
2	DF	Corey O'Keeffe	5 June 1998 (aged 16)			(The Football Association) Birmingham City
3	MF	Jonathan Lunney	2 February 1998 (aged 17)			(The Football Association) Preston North End
4	DF	Conor Masterson	8 September 1998 (aged 16)			(The Football Association) Liverpool
5	MF	Darragh Leahy	15 April 1998 (aged 17)			(The Football Association) Coventry City
6	MF	Marcus McGuane	2 February 1999 (aged 16)			(The Football Association) Arsenal
7	MF	Zack Elbouzedi	5 April 1998 (aged 17)			(The Football Association) West Bromwich Albion
8	MF	Conor Levingston	21 January 1998 (aged 17)			(The Football Association) Wolverhampton Wanderers
9	FW	Joshua Barrett	21 June 1998 (aged 16)			(The Football Association) Reading
10	MF	Connor Ronan	6 March 1998 (aged 17)			(The Football Association) Wolverhampton Wanderers
11	FW	Trevor Clarke	26 March 1998 (aged 17)			(Football Association of Ireland) St Kevin's Boys
12	DF	Luke Wade-Slater	2 March 1998 (aged 17)			(Football Association of Ireland) St Kevin's Boys
13	FW	Jamie Gray	13 April 1998 (aged 17)			(Football Association of Ireland) St Kevin's Boys
14	DF	Shane Hanney	19 February 1998 (aged 17)			(Football Association of Ireland) Shamrock Rovers
15	MF	Robert McCourt	6 April 1998 (aged 17)			(The Football Association) West Bromwich Albion
16	GK	David Craddock	30 January 1998 (aged 17)			(Football Association of Ireland) Shelbourne
17	FW	Jamie Aherne	8 July 1998 (aged 16)			(Football Association of Ireland) Lucan United
18	MF	Anthony Scully	19 April 1999 (aged 16)			(The Football Association) West Ham United
