= 2019–20 Olympiacos F.C. season =

Olympiacos
2019–20 season
- Owner: Evangelos Marinakis
- President: Yannis Moralis
- Manager: Pedro Martins
- Stadium: Karaiskakis Stadium, Piraeus
- Super League 1: 1st
- Greek Cup: Winners
- Champions League: Group stage
- Europa League: Round of 16
- Top goalscorer: League: Youssef El-Arabi (20); All: Youssef El-Arabi (27)
- Highest home attendance: 31,898
- Biggest win: Olympiacos 5–0 Volos; Asteras Tripolis 0–5 Olympiacos
- Biggest defeat: Tottenham 4–2 Olympiacos
Home colours	Away colours	Third colours

The 2019–20 season was Olympiacos's 61st consecutive season in the Super League 1 and their 95th year in existence. In this season they won a double, Olympiacos's 18th one.

== Players ==
=== First team ===
As of 1 February 2020

Squad No.	Name	Nationality	Position(s)	Place of birth	Date of birth (Age)	Previous club
Goalkeepers
1	José Sá	(Portugal)	GK	Braga, Portugal	17 January 1993 (26)	(Portugal) Porto
16	Bobby Allain	(France)	GK	Clamart, France	28 November 1991 (28)	(France) Dijon
81	Konstantinos Tzolakis	(Greece)	GK	Chania, Greece	8 November 2002 (17)	(Greece) Olympiacos U19
Defenders
3	Rúben Semedo	(Portugal)	CB	Amadora, Portugal	4 April 1994 (25)	(Spain) Villarreal
14	Omar Elabdellaoui	(Norway) (Morocco)	RB	Surnadal, Norway	5 December 1991 (28)	(Germany) Eintracht Braunschweig
21	Kostas Tsimikas	(Greece)	LB	Thessaloniki, Greece	12 May 1996 (23)	(Greece) Olympiacos U19
24	Ousseynou Ba	(Senegal)	CB	Dakar, Senegal	11 November 1995 (24)	(France) Gazélec Ajaccio
34	Avraam Papadopoulos	(Greece)	CB	Melbourne, Australia	3 December 1984 (35)	(Australia) Brisbane Roar
35	Vasilis Torosidis	(Greece)	RB	Xanthi, Greece	10 June 1985 (34)	(Italy) Bologna
66	Pape Abou Cissé	(Senegal)	CB	Pikine, Senegal	14 September 1995 (24)	(France) Ajaccio
76	Bruno Gaspar	(Angola) (Portugal)	LB/RB	Évora, Portugal	21 April 1993 (26)	(Portugal) Sporting CP
Midfielders
2	Hillal Soudani	(Algeria)	LW/RW/FW	Chlef, Algeria	25 November 1987 (32)	(England) Nottingham Forest
4	Mady Camara	(Guinea)	CM	Matam, Guinea	28 February 1997 (22)	(France) Ajaccio
5	Andreas Bouchalakis	(Greece)	CM	Heraklion, Greece	5 April 1993 (26)	(Greece) Ergotelis
7	Kostas Fortounis	(Greece)	AM	Trikala, Greece	16 October 1992 (27)	(Germany) Kaiserslautern
8	Guilherme	(Brazil) (Italy)	DM	Santo André, Brazil	5 April 1991 (28)	(Spain) Deportivo La Coruña
10	Emre Mor	(Turkey) (Denmark)	LW/RW	Brønshøj, Denmark	24 July 1997 (22)	(Spain) Celta Vigo
18	Bruno	(Brazil)	LW/RW/AM	São Paulo, Brazil	26 May 1994 (25)	(Austria) LASK
19	Georgios Masouras	(Greece)	LW/RW	Kechrinia, Greece	1 January 1994 (26)	(Greece) Panionios
22	Maximiliano Lovera	(Argentina)	RW/AM	Laguna Blanca, Argentina	9 March 1999 (20)	(Argentina) Rosario Central
26	Cafú	(Portugal)	CM	Guimarães, Portugal	26 February 1993 (26)	(Poland) Legia Warsaw
28	Mathieu Valbuena	(France)	LW/RW/AM	Bruges, France	28 September 1984 (35)	(Turkey) Fenerbahçe
57	Giorgos Xenitidis	(Greece)	CM	Xanthi, Greece	4 September 1999 (20)	(Greece) Olympiacos U19
77	Lazaros Christodoulopoulos	(Greece)	LW/RW	Thessaloniki, Greece	19 December 1986 (33)	(Greece) AEK Athens
97	Lazar Ranđelović	(Serbia)	RW	Pertate, Serbia	5 August 1997 (22)	(Serbia) Radnički Niš
Forwards
11	Youssef El-Arabi	(Morocco) (France)	FW	Caen, France	3 February 1987 (32)	(Qatar) Al-Duhail
99	Ahmed Hassan	(Egypt) (Portugal)	FW	Cairo, Egypt	5 March 1993 (26)	(Portugal) Braga

=== Out on loan ===
As of 1 February 2020

Name	Nationality	Position(s)	Date of birth (Age)	To Club
Marios Siampanis	(Greece)	GK	28 September 1999 (20)	(England) Nottingham Forest
Fodé Camara	(Guinea)	LB	17 April 1998 (21)	(France) Gazélec Ajaccio
Leonardo Koutris	(Greece) (Brazil)	LB	23 July 1995 (24)	(Spain) Mallorca
Yassine Meriah	(Tunisia)	CB	2 July 1993 (26)	(Turkey) Kasımpaşa
Stefanos Evangelou	(Greece)	CB	12 May 1998 (21)	(Greece) Panionios
Svetozar Marković	(Serbia) (Bosnia and Herzegovina)	CB	23 March 2000 (19)	(Greece) AEL
Igor Silva	(Brazil)	RB	21 August 1996 (23)	(Croatia) Osijek
Giannis Masouras	(Greece)	RB	24 August 1996 (23)	(Greece) AEL
Nemanja Nikolić	(Bosnia and Herzegovina)	RB	21 February 2001 (18)	(Serbia) Radnički Niš
Abdoulaye Keita	(Mali)	DM	5 January 1994 (26)	(France) Ajaccio
Ioannis Kosti	(Cyprus)	CM	17 March 2000 (19)	(Cyprus) Nea Salamina
Marios Vrousai	(Greece)	LW	2 July 1998 (21)	(Netherlands) Willem II
Giorgos Manthatis	(Greece)	RW	11 May 1997 (22)	(Cyprus) Anorthosis
Nikola Čumić	(Serbia)	RW	20 November 1998 (21)	(Serbia) Radnički Niš
Thanasis Androutsos	(Greece)	AM	6 May 1997 (20)	(Greece) Atromitos
Dimitrios Manos	(Greece)	FW	16 September 1994 (25)	(Greece) OFI
Franco Soldano	(Argentina)	FW	14 September 1994 (25)	(Argentina) Boca Juniors
Hugo Cuypers	(Belgium)	FW	7 February 1997 (22)	(France) Ajaccio
Miguel Ángel Guerrero	(Spain)	FW	12 July 1990 (29)	(Spain) Leganés
Fiorin Durmishaj	(Greece) (Albania)	FW	14 November 1996 (23)	(Greece) Aris

== Backroom staff ==
=== Coaching staff ===
Position	Staff
Sport director	(France) Christian Karembeu
Head coach	(Portugal) Pedro Martins
Assistant coaches	(Portugal) Antonio Henriques
Assistant coaches	(Portugal) Rui Pedro Castro
Analysts	(Portugal) Luís Antero Lobo
Analysts	(Greece) Giorgos Martakos
Analysts	(Greece) Giannis Vogiatzakis
Analysts	(Greece) Iosif Loukas
Fitness coach	(Greece) Christos Mourikis
Goalkeepers' trainer	(Greece) Panagiotis Agriogiannis
Rehabilitation trainer	(Greece) Zacharias Paschalidis
Medical team
Head doctor	(Greece) Christos Theos
Head physiotherapist	(Greece) Dimitris Skordis
Physios	(Greece) Nikos Lykouresis
Physios	(Greece) Panagiotis Sivilias
Physios	(Greece) Sifis Kleidis
Nutritionist	(Portugal) Hernani Araujo Gomes
Masseur	(Greece) Aristeidis Chelioudakis
Scouts
Chief Scout	(France) François Modesto
Scout	(Greece) Simos Havos
Scout	(Argentina) Chori Domínguez

== Transfers ==
=== In ===
No.	Pos.	Nat.	Name	Age	EU	Moving from	Type	Transfer window	Ends	Transfer fee	Source
3	DF	(Portugal)	Rúben Semedo	25	EU	(Spain) Villarreal	Transfer	Summer	2023	€4.5M	
22	MF	(Argentina)	Maximiliano Lovera	20	Non-EU	(Argentina) Rosario Central	Transfer	Summer	2024	€3M	
1	GK	(Portugal)	José Sá	26	EU	(Portugal) Porto	Transfer	Summer	2023	€2.5M	
15	DF	(Serbia)	Svetozar Marković	19	EU	(Serbia) Partizan	Transfer	Summer	2024	€1.5M	
18	MF	(Brazil)	Bruno	25	Non-EU	(Austria) LASK	Transfer	Summer	2022	€500k	
	FW	(Greece)	Fiorin Durmishaj	23	EU	(Greece) Panionios	Transfer	Summer	2022	€500k	
	DF	(Guinea)	Fodé Camara	21	Non-EU	(France) Gazélec Ajaccio	Transfer	Summer	2023	€500k	
	MF	(Bosnia and Herzegovina)	Nemanja Nikolić	18	EU	(Bosnia and Herzegovina) Mladost Doboj Kakanj	Transfer	Summer	2023	€300k	
28	MF	(France)	Mathieu Valbuena	34	EU	(Turkey) Fenerbahçe	Transfer	Summer	2020	Free	
16	GK	(France)	Bobby Allain	27	EU	(France) Dijon	Transfer	Summer	2021	Free	
	FW	(Belgium)	Hugo Cuypers	22	EU	(Greece) Ergotelis	Transfer	Summer	2023	Free	
	GK	(Greece)	Marios Siampanis	19	EU	(Greece) PAOK	Transfer	Summer	2023	Free	
11	FW	(Morocco)	Youssef El-Arabi	32	EU	(Qatar) Al-Duhail	Transfer	Summer	2021	Free	
2	MF	(Algeria)	Hilal Soudani	31	Non-EU	(England) Nottingham Forest	Transfer	Summer	2021	Undisclosed	
	MF	(Mali)	Abdoulaye Keita	24	Non-EU	(Greece) Panionios	Transfer	Summer	2023	Undisclosed	
6	MF	(Algeria)	Yassine Benzia	24	EU	(France) Lille	Loan	Summer	2020		
76	DF	(Angola)	Bruno Gaspar	26	EU	(Portugal) Sporting CP	Loan	Summer	2020		
97	MF	(Serbia)	Lazar Ranđelović	21	EU	(Serbia) Radnički Niš	End of loan	Summer	2023		
24	DF	(Senegal)	Ousseynou Ba	23	Non-EU	(France) Gazélec Ajaccio	End of loan	Summer	2023		
	MF	(Cyprus)	Ioannis Kosti	19	EU	(Cyprus) Nea Salamina	Transfer	Winter	2024	€500k	
	MF	(Serbia)	Nikola Čumić	21	EU	(Serbia) Radnički Niš	Transfer	Winter	2022	€500k	
	FW	(Greece)	Fiorin Durmishaj	23	EU	(Belgium) Waasland-Beveren	End of loan	Winter	2022		
	DF	(Greece)	Giannis Masouras	23	EU	(Greece) Panionios	End of loan	Winter	2023		
	FW	(Egypt)	Ahmed Hassan	26	EU	(Portugal) Braga	Loan	Winter	2020		
10	MF	(Turkey)	Emre Mor	22	EU	(Spain) Celta Vigo	Loan	Winter	2020	€410k	
26	MF	(Portugal)	Cafú	26	EU	(Poland) Legia Warsaw	Transfer	Winter	2023	€500k	

▼ Total Spending: €15.21M

=== Out ===
No.	Pos.	Nat.	Name	Age	EU	Moving to	Type	Transfer window	Transfer fee	Source
	DF	(Portugal)	Roderick Miranda	28	EU	(England) Wolves	End of loan	Summer		
	MF	(Portugal)	Gil Dias	22	EU	(France) Monaco	End of loan	Summer		
	FW	(Egypt)	Ahmed Hassan	26	EU	(Portugal) Braga	End of loan	Summer		
	GK	(Russia)	Yuri Lodygin	29	EU	(Russia) Zenit Saint Petersburg	End of loan	Summer		
	DF	(Belgium)	Björn Engels	24	EU	(France) Reims	Transfer	Summer	€4M	
	DF	(Greece)	Dimitris Nikolaou	20	EU	(Italy) Empoli	Transfer	Summer	€3.5M	
	FW	(Argentina)	Franco Soldano	24	Non-EU	(Argentina) Boca Juniors	Loan	Summer	€250k	
	MF	(Israel)	Bibras Natkho	31	Non-EU	(Serbia) Partizan	Transfer	Summer	Free	
	MF	(Spain)	Matías Nahuel	22	EU	(Spain) Tenerife	Transfer	Summer	Free	
	DF	(Greece)	Stefanos Evangelou	21	EU	(Greece) Panionios	Loan	Summer	Free	
	GK	(Greece)	Andreas Gianniotis	26	EU	(Israel) Maccabi Tel Aviv	Transfer	Summer	Free	
	DF	(Greece)	Dimitrios Goutas	25	EU	(Greece) Atromitos	Transfer	Summer	Free	
	DF	(Greece)	Manolis Saliakas	22	EU	(Greece) Lamia	Transfer	Summer	Free	
	DF	(Serbia)	Jagoš Vuković	31	EU		Released	Summer		
	GK	(Greece)	Lefteris Choutesiotis	25	EU	(Greece) PAS Giannina	Transfer	Summer	Free	
	GK	(Greece)	Marios Siampanis	19	EU	(England) Nottingham Forest	Loan	Summer	Free	
	FW	(Belgium)	Hugo Cuypers	22	EU	(France) Ajaccio	Loan	Summer	Free	
	DF	(Brazil)	Igor Silva	23	Non-EU	(Croatia) Osijek	Loan	Summer	Free	
	DF	(Greece)	Giannis Masouras	23	EU	(Greece) Panionios	Loan	Summer	Free	
	DF	(Guinea)	Fodé Camara	21	Non-EU	(France) Gazélec Ajaccio	Loan	Summer	Free	
	DF	(Bosnia and Herzegovina)	Nemanja Nikolić	18	EU	(Serbia) Radnički Niš	Loan	Summer	Free	
	MF	(Mali)	Abdoulaye Keita	24	Non-EU	(France) Ajaccio	Loan	Summer	Free	
	FW	(Greece)	Marios Vrousai	21	EU	(Netherlands) Willem II	Loan	Summer	Free	
	MF	(Greece)	Giorgos Manthatis	22	EU	(Cyprus) Anorthosis	Loan	Summer	Free	
	MF	(Greece)	Thanasis Androutsos	22	EU	(Greece) Atromitos	Loan	Summer	Free	
	FW	(Greece)	Dimitrios Manos	24	EU	(Greece) OFI	Loan	Summer	Free	
	FW	(Greece)	Fiorin Durmishaj	23	EU	(Belgium) Waasland-Beveren	Loan	Summer	Free	
	MF	(Cyprus)	Ioannis Kosti	19	EU	(Cyprus) Nea Salamina	Loan	Winter	Free	
	MF	(Serbia)	Nikola Čumić	21	EU	(Serbia) Radnički Niš	Loan	Winter	Free	
	FW	(Greece)	Fiorin Durmishaj	23	EU	(Greece) Aris	Loan	Winter	Free	
	DF	(Greece)	Giannis Masouras	23	EU	(Greece) AEL	Loan	Winter	Free	
	DF	(Greece)	Leonardo Koutris	24	EU	(Spain) Mallorca	Loan	Winter	Free	
	MF	(Portugal)	Daniel Podence	24	EU	(England) Wolves	Transfer	Winter	€20.2M	
	MF	(Algeria)	Yassine Benzia	25	EU	(France) Lille	End of loan	Winter		
	DF	(Tunisia)	Yassine Meriah	26	Non-EU	(Turkey) Kasımpaşa	Loan	Winter	Free	
	FW	(Spain)	Miguel Ángel Guerrero	29	EU	(Spain) Leganés	Loan	Winter	Free	
	DF	(Serbia)	Svetozar Marković	19	EU	(Greece) AEL	Loan	Winter	Free	
	DF	(Cameroon)	Yaya Banana	28	Non-EU		Released	Winter		

▲ Total Income: €27.95M

Net Income: ▲€12.74M

== Friendlies ==
Win Draw Loss

28 June 2019	Olympiacos	1–1	Pogoń Szczecin	Chojnice, Poland
18:00 CEST	Masouras 65'		Guarrotxena 19'	Stadium: Mistral Stadion

29 June 2019	Hapoel Be'er Sheva	2–2	Olympiacos	Chojnice, Poland
18:00 CEST	Sahar 34'; Marín (yellow card) 37'; Hasselbaink 60'		Durmishaj 28'; Torosidis (yellow card) 37'; Podence (yellow card) 37'; Guerrero (yellow card) 71'; Tsimikas (yellow card) 89'; Valbuena 90' (pen.)	Stadium: Mistral Stadion

3 July 2019	Lechia Gdańsk	1–1	Olympiacos	Gdańsk, Poland
17:00 CEST	Łukasik (yellow card) 32'; Fila (yellow card) 56'; Nalepa (yellow card) 58'; Wolski 69'		Valbuena (yellow card) 56'; Tsimikas (yellow card) 62'; Androutsos (yellow card) 77'; Guerrero 90'	Stadium: Stadion Energa Gdańsk

5 July 2019	Jagiellonia Białystok	0–5	Olympiacos	Sulejówek, Poland
17:00 CEST	Klimala (yellow card) 56' (yellow-red card) 73'		Androutsos (yellow card) 8'; Masouras 11'; Guerrero 31', 45', 57'; Fortounis 77'	Stadium: Stadion Miejski w Sulejówku

8 July 2019	Olympiacos	1–1	Dynamo Kyiv	Schwaz, Austria
18:00 CEST	Bouchalakis 5'		Sol 45' (pen.)	Stadium: Silberstadt-Arena Schwaz; Referee: Walter Altmann

8 July 2019	Olympiacos	1–1	Hamburger SV	Jenbach, Austria
18:00 CEST	Semedo 81'		Gyamerah (yellow card) 43'; Hinterseer 87'	Stadium: Stadion Jenbach

16 July 2019	Olympiacos	3–0	Nottingham Forest	Piraeus, Greece
21:30 EEST	Masouras 3'; Guerrero 7', 32'			Stadium: Karaiskakis Stadium

30 July 2020	Olympiacos	3–0	Omonia	Agios Ioannis Rentis, Greece
17:00 EEST	Camara 42'; Valbuena 45'; Ranđelović 56'			Stadium: Olympiacos training ground Attendance: 0 (closed doors)

== Competitions ==
=== Overview ===
Competition	First match	Last match	Starting round	Final position	Record							
Competition	First match	Last match	Starting round	Final position	Pld	W	D	L	GF	GA	GD	Win %
Super League Greece	24 August 2019	19 July 2020	Matchday 1	Winners	36	28	7	1	74	16	+58	77.78
Greek Football Cup	8 January 2020	12 September 2020	Sixth Round	Winners	7	5	1	1	14	6	+8	71.43
UEFA Champions League	23 July 2019	11 December 2019	Second qualifying round	Group stage	12	6	2	4	21	15	+6	50.00
UEFA Europa League	20 February 2020	6 August 2020	Round of 32	Round of 16	4	1	1	2	3	4	−1	25.00
Total					59	40	11	8	112	41	+71	67.80

Last updated: 12 September 2020
Source: Competitions

=== Super League 1 Greece ===
==== League table ====
Pos	Team	Pld	W	D	L	GF	GA	GD	Pts	Qualification
1	Olympiacos	26	20	6	0	53	9	+44	66	Qualification for the Play-off round
2	PAOK	26	18	5	3	50	23	+27	59	Qualification for the Play-off round
3	AEK Athens	26	15	6	5	42	22	+20	51	Qualification for the Play-off round
4	Panathinaikos	26	12	8	6	35	23	+12	44	Qualification for the Play-off round
5	OFI	26	10	4	12	35	35	0	34 (Note: Head-to-head points: OFI 4, Aris 1.)	Qualification for the Play-off round

Source: Super League Greece
Rules for classification: 1) Points; 2) Head-to-head points; 3) Head-to-head goal difference; 4) Goal difference; 5) Goals scored; 6) Play-offs (neutral ground).
(Note: Criteria 6 is only used if needed to decide champion, teams for relegation or teams for UEFA competitions).

==== Results summary ====
Overall								Home						Away					
Pld	W	D	L	GF	GA	GD	Pts	W	D	L	GF	GA	GD	W	D	L	GF	GA	GD
36	28	7	1	74	16	+58	91	16	1	1	44	9	+35	12	6	0	30	7	+23

Last updated: 19 July 2020.
Source: Super League Greece

==== Results by matchday ====
Matchday	1	2	3	4	5	6	7	8	9	10	11	12	13	14	15	16	17	18	19	20	21	22	23	24	25	26
Ground	H	A	H	A	H	A	H	H	A	H	A	H	A	A	H	A	H	A	H	A	A	H	A	H	A	H
Result	W	W	W	D	W	W	W	W	D	W	D	D	W	W	W	D	W	W	W	W	D	W	W	W	W	W
Position	4	4	1	1	1	1	1	1	1	1	1	1	1	1	1	2	1	1	1	1	2	1	1	1	1	1

Updated to match(es) played on 1 March 2020. Source: Super League Greece
A = Away; H = Home; W = Win; D = Draw; L = Loss

Championship round matchday	1	2	3	4	5	6	7	8	9	10
Ground	A	H	H	A	H	A	A	H	A	H
Result	W	W	W	W	W	D	W	L	W	W
Position	1	1	1	1	1	1	1	1	1	1

Updated to match(es) played on 19 July 2020. Source: Super League Greece
A = Away; H = Home; W = Win; D = Draw; L = Loss

==== Regular season matches ====
Win Draw Loss

24 August 2019 1	Olympiacos	1–0	Asteras Tripolis	Piraeus
21:30 EEST	El-Arabi 6' (pen.)	Report		Stadium: Karaiskakis Stadium; Attendance: 18,921; Referee: Stefanos Koubarakis

1 September 2019 2	AEL	0–1	Olympiacos	Larissa
19:15 EEST	Fatjon (yellow card) 13'; Šećerović (yellow card) 27'	Report	Valbuena 7' (pen.); Tsimikas (yellow card) 28'; Guilherme (yellow card) 45'	Stadium: AEL FC Arena; Attendance: 3,883; Referee: Angelos Evangelou

14 September 2019 3	Olympiacos	5–0	Volos	Piraeus
21:30 EEST	Guilherme 12'; Podence (yellow card) 37'; Elabdellaoui (yellow card) 52'; El-Arabi 72'; Guerrero 79'; Valbuena 83' (pen.); Soudani 90'	Report	Mystakidis (yellow card) 17'; Muñiz (yellow card) 41'; Joao (yellow card) 59'; Augusto (yellow card) 81'; Lyratzis (red card) 82'	Stadium: Karaiskakis Stadium; Attendance: 22,532; Referee: Fotis Fotiadis

21 September 2019 4	Panathinaikos	1–1	Olympiacos	Athens
20:30 EEST	Donis (yellow card) 7'; Kourbelis (yellow card) 42'; Macheda (yellow card) 43'; Insúa (yellow card) 65'; Mollo 90' (pen.); Poungouras (yellow card) 90'	Report	Semedo (yellow card) 27'; Guerrero 36', (yellow card) 45'	Stadium: Olympic Stadium; Attendance: 6,700; Referee: Sascha Stegemann (Germany)

28 September 2019 5	Olympiacos	2–0	Lamia	Piraeus
19:30 EEST	Soudani 61'; El-Arabi 70'	Report	Tzanetopoulos (yellow card) 72'; Dimoutsos (yellow card) 77'	Stadium: Karaiskakis Stadium; Attendance: 21,123; Referee: Aristotelis Diamantopoulos

6 October 2019 6	Aris	1–2	Olympiacos	Thessaloniki
19:30 EEST	Diguiny 7'; Gama (yellow card) 46'; Korhut (yellow card) 65'; Sundgren (yellow card) 69'; Tonso (yellow card) 90'	Report	Masouras 33'; El-Arabi 38'; Torosidis (yellow card) 58'; Papadopoulos (yellow card) 69'; Semedo (yellow card) 77'; Guilherme (yellow card) 90'; Sá (yellow card) 90'	Stadium: Kleanthis Vikelidis Stadium; Attendance: 13,143; Referee: Giorgos Tzovaras

19 October 2019 7	Olympiacos	2–1	OFI	Piraeus
19:30 EEST	Soudani 11', 57'; Lovera (yellow card) 38'; Sá (yellow card) 90'	Report	Nabi 45'; Korovesis (yellow card) 88'; Nabi (yellow card) 90'	Stadium: Karaiskakis Stadium; Attendance: 25,121; Referee: Giannis Papadopoulos

26 October 2019 8	Olympiacos	2–0	AEK Athens	Piraeus
19:30 EEST	Semedo (yellow card) 2', (goal) 9'; Camara 77'; Masouras (yellow card) 87'	Report	Galanopoulos (yellow card) 48'; Lopes (yellow card) 79'; Oliveira (yellow card) 86'	Stadium: Karaiskakis Stadium; Attendance: 31,157; Referee: Jorge Sousa (Portugal)

2 November 2019 9	Xanthi	0–0	Olympiacos	Xanthi
20:00 EET	Abad (yellow card) 90'; Lisgaras (yellow card) 90'	Report	Masouras (yellow card) 69'; Papadopoulos (yellow card) 70'; Tsimikas (yellow card) 85'	Stadium: Xanthi FC Arena; Attendance: 3,315; Referee: Aristotelis Diamantopoulos

9 November 2019 10	Olympiacos	2–0	Atromitos	Piraeus
17:15 EET	Papadopoulos (yellow card) 40' (yellow-red card) 67'; Podence 60'; Soudani 62'	Report	Garoufalias (yellow card) 61'; Natsos (yellow card) 80'; Katranis (yellow card) 87'; Charisis (yellow card) 90'	Stadium: Karaiskakis Stadium; Attendance: 22,532; Referee: Manolis Skoulas

23 November 2019 11	Panionios	1–1	Olympiacos	Athens
19:30 EET	Emmanouilidis 88'; Malherbe (yellow card) 90'	Report	Valbuena 55' (pen.); Camara (yellow card) 62'	Stadium: Nea Smyrni Stadium; Attendance: 3,054; Referee: Giorgos Kominis

1 December 2019 12	Olympiacos	1–1	PAOK	Piraeus
19:30 EET	Valbuena 64' (pen.); Guilherme (yellow card) 65'; Camara (yellow card) 79'	Report	Biseswar (yellow card) 21'; Ingason 29'; Augusto (yellow card) 37'; Mišić (yellow card) 52'; Pelkas (yellow card) 89'; Živković (yellow card) 90'	Stadium: Karaiskakis Stadium; Attendance: 31,616; Referee: José María Sánchez Martínez (Spain)

7 December 2019 13	Panetolikos	0–3	Olympiacos	Agrinio
20:00 EET		Report	Podence 6'; El-Arabi 41', 45'; Semedo (yellow card) 44'; Elabdellaoui (yellow card) 60'; Camara (yellow card) 68'; Soudani (yellow card) 88'	Stadium: Panetolikos Stadium; Attendance: 2,805; Referee: Dimitris Karantonis

15 December 2019 14	Asteras Tripolis	0–5	Olympiacos	Tripoli
19:30 EET	Pasalidis (red card) 16'; Tasoulis (yellow card) 51'	Report	Masouras 5', 73'; Podence 9'; El-Arabi 34', 44'	Stadium: Theodoros Kolokotronis Stadium; Attendance: 4,933; Referee: Anastasios Papapetrou

18 December 2019 15	Olympiacos	4–1	AEL	Piraeus
17:15 EET	Masouras 9', 11'; Soudani 17'; El-Arabi 37' (pen.)	Report	Warda 56'	Stadium: Karaiskakis Stadium; Attendance: 0 (closed doors); Referee: Thanasis Sezos

22 December 2019 16	Volos	0–0	Olympiacos	Volos
17:15 EET	Muñiz (yellow card) 71'; Garavelis (yellow card) 74'; Lyratzis (yellow card) 76'	Report		Stadium: Panthessaliko Stadium; Attendance: 2,372; Referee: Vasilis Fotias

5 January 2020 17	Olympiacos	1–0	Panathinaikos	Piraeus
19:30 EET	Elabdellaoui (yellow card) 45'; El-Arabi 74'; Christodoulopoulos (yellow card) 78'	Report	Chatzigiovanis (yellow card) 18'; Insúa (yellow card) 40'; Poungouras (yellow card) 64'; Kourbelis (yellow card) 90'	Stadium: Karaiskakis Stadium; Attendance: 0 (closed doors); Referee: Mattias Gestranius (Finland)

12 January 2020 18	Lamia	0–4	Olympiacos	Lamia
17:15 EET	Pliatsikas (yellow card) 32' (yellow-red card) 70'	Report	Ba (yellow card) 26'; El-Arabi 40', 51', 81'; Semedo (yellow card) 47'; Valbuena 70' (pen.); Masouras (yellow card) 89'	Stadium: Lamia Municipal Stadium; Attendance: 3,832; Referee: Petros Tsagarakis

19 January 2020 19	Olympiacos	4–2	Aris	Piraeus
19:30 EET	Bouchalakis (yellow card) 20'; Guilherme 22'; El-Arabi 24'; Camara (yellow card) 28'; Elabdellaoui 44'; Valbuena 63' (pen.)	Report	Rose 37'; Mancini (yellow card) 45'; Diguiny (yellow card) 59', (goal) 83'; Vélez (yellow card) 61'; Korhut (yellow card) 80'	Stadium: Karaiskakis Stadium; Attendance: 25,622; Referee: Giorgos Tzovaras

22 January 2020 20	OFI	0–1	Olympiacos	Heraklion
17:15 EET	Neira (yellow card) 30'	Report	Tsimikas (yellow card) 33'; Camara 45'; Elabdellaoui (yellow card) 64'; Semedo (yellow card) 67' (yellow-red card) 90'	Stadium: Theodoros Vardinogiannis Stadium; Attendance: 5,685; Referee: Vangelis Manouchos

26 January 2020 21	AEK Athens	0–0	Olympiacos	Athens
19:30 EET	Simões (yellow card) 70' (yellow-red card) 87'	Report	Masouras (yellow card) 47'	Stadium: Olympic Stadium; Attendance: 23,741; Referee: Matej Jug (Slovenia)

1 February 2020 22	Olympiacos	3–1	Xanthi	Piraeus
19:30 EET	Soudani 5'; El-Arabi 43'; Fasidis 52' (o.g.); Semedo (yellow card) 69'; Guilherme (yellow card) 73'	Report	Thymianis (yellow card) 40'; Castro 71', (yellow card) 80'; Barrientos (yellow card) 77'	Stadium: Karaiskakis Stadium; Attendance: 24,521; Referee: Dimitris Karantonis

9 February 2020 23	Atromitos	0–1	Olympiacos	Peristeri
17:15 EET	Stroungis (yellow card) 34'; Goutas (yellow card) 54'	Report	Elabdellaoui (yellow card) 41' (yellow-red card) 73'; Guilherme (yellow card) 60'; Tsimikas (yellow card) 82'; Hassan 90'; Bouchalakis (yellow card) 90'	Stadium: Peristeri Stadium; Attendance: 1,615; Referee: Urs Schnyder (Switzerland)

15 February 2020 24	Olympiacos	4–0	Panionios	Piraeus
19:30 EET	Hassan 4'; El-Arabi 6', 24'; Fortounis 9'	Report	Saramantas (yellow card) 74'	Stadium: Karaiskakis Stadium; Attendance: 21,231; Referee: Aristidis Vatsios

23 February 2020 25	PAOK	0–1	Olympiacos	Thessaloniki
19:30 EET		Report	Giannoulis 49' (o.g.); Ba (yellow card) 76'; Guilherme (yellow card) 88'	Stadium: Toumba Stadium; Attendance: 26,377; Referee: Tobias Stieler (Germany)

1 March 2020 26	Olympiacos	2–0	Panetolikos	Piraeus
19:00 EET	Ba (yellow card) 23'; Masouras 60'; Cissé (yellow card) 83'; Bouchalakis 90'	Report	Mounier (yellow card) 31'; Martínez (yellow card) 61'; Malis (yellow card) 66'; Dálcio (yellow card) 76'; Martial (yellow card) 82'	Stadium: Karaiskakis Stadium; Attendance: 22,135; Referee: Petros Tsagarakis

==== Play-off round matches ====
7 June 2020 1	PAOK	0–1	Olympiacos	Thessaloniki
19:30 EET	Varela (yellow card) 48'	Report	El-Arabi 23'; Tsimikas (yellow card) 66'; Ranđelović (yellow card) 77'; Sá (yellow card) 90'; Gaspar (yellow card) 90'	Stadium: Toumba Stadium; Attendance: 0 (closed doors); Referee: Anastasios Papapetrou

14 June 2020 2	Olympiacos	3–1	Aris	Piraeus
21:30 EET	Camara 27', 28'; Masouras 38'; Cissé (yellow card) 72'	Report	Vélez (yellow card) 54'; Ideye 64'	Stadium: Karaiskakis Stadium; Attendance: 0 (closed doors); Referee: Vangelis Manouchos

21 June 2020 3	Olympiacos	3–0	Panathinaikos	Piraeus
21:30 EET	Guilherme 5', (yellow card) 48'; El-Arabi 21'; Gaspar (yellow card) 90'; Cafú 90'	Report	Chatzitheodoridis (yellow card) 33'; Kourbelis (yellow card) 42'; Chatzigiovanis (yellow card) 43'; Anuar (yellow card) 74'; Zagaritis (yellow card) 82'	Stadium: Karaiskakis Stadium; Attendance: 0 (closed doors); Referee: Anastasios Sidiropoulos

28 June 2020 4	AEK Athens	1–2	Olympiacos	Athens
21:30 EEST	Livaja (yellow card) 7'; Araujo 66'	Report	El-Arabi 38'; Camara 45'; Semedo (yellow card) 55'; Bouchalakis (yellow card) 83'	Stadium: Olympic Stadium; Attendance: 0 (closed doors); Referee: Clément Turpin (France)

1 July 2020 5	Olympiacos	2–1	OFI	Piraeus
21:30 EEST	Hassan 27', 83'; Camara (yellow card) 81'; Cissé (yellow card) 89'	Report	Sakor 45'; João Victor (yellow card) 79'	Stadium: Karaiskakis Stadium; Attendance: 0 (closed doors); Referee: Giorgos Vreskas

5 July 2020 6	Panathinaikos	0–0	Olympiacos	Athens
21:30 EEST	Theocharis (yellow card) 26'; Kourbelis (yellow card) 77'; Kolovos (yellow card) 80'	Report	Ba (yellow card) 21'; Hassan (yellow card) 58'; El-Arabi (yellow card) 66'; Gaspar (yellow card) 74'; Cissé (yellow card) 90'	Stadium: Olympic Stadium; Attendance: 0 (closed doors); Referee: Giorgos Kominis

8 July 2020 7	Aris	2–4	Olympiacos	Thessaloniki
19:15 EEST	Fetfatzidis 56'; Bagalianis 87'; Matilla (yellow card) 90'	Report	Masouras 34', 49'; Cafú (yellow card) 42'; Hassan 45', 65' (pen.); Bruno (yellow card) 90'	Stadium: Kleanthis Vikelidis Stadium; Attendance: 0 (closed doors); Referee: Menios Koutsiaftis

12 July 2020 8	Olympiacos	0–1	PAOK	Piraeus
21:45 EEST	Elabdellaoui (yellow card) 38'; Bouchalakis (yellow card) 50'; Cissé (yellow card) 71'	Report	Giannoulis (yellow card) 33'; El Kaddouri (yellow card) 47'; Biseswar (yellow card) 52'; Mihaj (yellow card) 85', (goal) 90'	Stadium: Karaiskakis Stadium; Attendance: 0 (closed doors); Referee: Vangelis Manouchos

15 July 2020 9	OFI	1–3	Olympiacos	Heraklion
19:15 EET	Koutroumpis (yellow card) 9'; Korovesis (yellow card) 48'; Marinakis (yellow card) 65'; Deligiannidis 90'	Report	Fortounis 10' (pen.), 61'; Ranđelović 28'; Ba (yellow card) 64'	Stadium: Theodoros Vardinogiannis Stadium; Attendance: 0 (closed doors); Referee: Aristidis Vatsios

19 July 2020 10	Olympiacos	3–0	AEK Athens	Piraeus
20:00 EET	Valbuena 10'; Ranđelović 21'; Camara 73'	Report		Stadium: Karaiskakis Stadium; Attendance: 0 (closed doors); Referee: Anastasios Papapetrou

=== Greek Football Cup ===
Win Draw Loss

==== Round of 16 ====
8 January 2020 First leg	Kalamata	0–2	Olympiacos	Kalamata
15:00 EET			Ranđelović 6'; Christodoulopoulos 53'; Meriah (yellow card) 82'	Stadium: Kalamata Municipal Stadium; Referee: Alexandros Katsikogiannis

15 January 2020 Second leg	Olympiacos	4–1 (6–1 agg.)	Kalamata	Piraeus
17:30 EET	Lovera 3', 68'; Guerrero 17', 51'; Cissé (yellow card) 53'		El Idrissi 66'	Stadium: Karaiskakis Stadium; Referee: Aristidis Vatsios

==== Quarter-finals ====
4 February 2020 First leg	Lamia	0–0	Olympiacos	Lamia
18:00 EET	Sassi (yellow card) 66'; Bouloulis (yellow card) 82'		Gaspar (yellow card) 41'; Torosidis (yellow card) 90'	Stadium: Lamia Municipal Stadium; Referee: Giorgos Vreskas

12 February 2020 Second leg	Olympiacos	3–2 (3–2 agg.)	Lamia	Piraeus
18:00 EET	Hassan 60'; Cissé 72', 77', (yellow card) 89'; Guilherme (yellow card) 87'		Romanić (yellow card) 36' (yellow-red card) 61'; Adejo 45'; Vasilogiannis (yellow card) 55'; Bouloulis (yellow card) 63'; Villalba 90' (pen.)	Stadium: Karaiskakis Stadium; Referee: Menios Koutsiaftis

==== Semi-finals ====
4 March 2020 First leg	PAOK	3–2	Olympiacos	Thessaloniki
21:30 EET	Pelkas 10', 69' (pen.), (yellow card) 62'; Mišić 12', (yellow card) 28'; Matos (yellow card) 43'; Maurício (yellow card) 80'; Giannoulis (red card) 85'		Hassan 3'; Guilherme 8'; Cissé (yellow card) 28'; Semedo (yellow card) 30'; Elabdellaoui (yellow card) 33'; Camara (yellow card) 71'	Stadium: Toumba Stadium; Referee: Xavier Estrada Fernández (Spain)

24 June 2020 Second leg	Olympiacos	2–0 (4–3 agg.)	PAOK	Piraeus
21:30 EET	Bouchalakis (yellow card) 19'; Tsimikas (yellow card) 60'; Masouras 65'; Camara (yellow card) 67', (goal) 85'; Fortounis (yellow card) 84'		Esiti (yellow card) 33'; Ingason (yellow card) 53'; Limnios (yellow card) 58'; El Kaddouri (yellow card) 67' (yellow-red card) 90'; Varela (yellow card) 87'	Stadium: Karaiskakis Stadium; Attendance: 0 (closed doors); Referee: Björn Kuipers (Netherlands)

==== Final ====
12 September 2020	AEK Athens	0–1	Olympiacos	Volos
21:00 EET	Simões (yellow card) 29'; Mantalos (yellow card) 55'; Livaja (yellow card) 83'; Lopes (yellow card) 90'; Krstičić (yellow card) 90'		Ranđelović 10'; Torosidis (yellow card) 55'; Masouras (yellow card) 84'; Cafú (yellow card) 89'	Stadium: Panthessaliko Stadium; Attendance: 0 (closed doors); Referee: Björn Kuipers (Netherlands)

=== UEFA Champions League ===
Win Draw Loss

==== Second qualifying round ====
23 July 2019 First leg	Viktoria Plzeň (Czech Republic)	0–0	(Greece) Olympiacos	Plzeň, Czech Republic
19:00	Havel (yellow card) 74'	Report	Semedo (yellow card) 34'	Stadium: Doosan Arena; Attendance: 10,632; Referee: Marco Guida (Italy)

30 July 2019 Second leg	Olympiacos (Greece)	4–0 (4–0 agg.)	(Czech Republic) Viktoria Plzeň	Piraeus, Greece
21:30	Guilherme 51', 73'; Tsimikas (yellow card) 56'; Guerrero 70'; Semedo 82'	Report	Brabec (yellow card) 53'; Chorý (yellow card) 90'	Stadium: Karaiskakis Stadium; Attendance: 30,123; Referee: Juan Martínez Munuera (Spain)

==== Third qualifying round ====
7 August 2019 First leg	İstanbul Başakşehir (Turkey)	0–1	(Greece) Olympiacos	Istanbul, Turkey
19:45	Crivelli (yellow card) 2'; Višća (yellow card) 7'; Kahveci (yellow card) 21' (yellow-red card) 80'; Clichy (yellow card) 32'; Vieira (yellow card) 76'	Report	Tsimikas (yellow card) 36'; Geo. Masouras 53'; Valbuena (yellow card) 73'; Bruno (yellow card) 87'	Stadium: Başakşehir Fatih Terim Stadium; Attendance: 4,301; Referee: Orel Grinfeld (Israel)

13 August 2019 Second leg	Olympiacos (Greece)	2–0 (3–0 agg.)	(Turkey) İstanbul Başakşehir	Piraeus, Greece
21:30	Semedo 55', (yellow card) 59'; Elabdellaoui (yellow card) 70'; Valbuena 78' (pen.)	Report	Okechukwu (yellow card) 36'; Clichy (yellow card) 62'	Stadium: Karaiskakis Stadium; Attendance: 28,521; Referee: Bobby Madden (Scotland)

==== Play-off round ====
21 August 2019 First leg	Olympiacos (Greece)	4–0	(Russia) Krasnodar	Piraeus, Greece
22:00	Guerrero 30'; Ranđelović 78', 85', (yellow card) 87'; Torosidis (yellow card) 79'; Podence 89'	Report		Stadium: Karaiskakis Stadium; Attendance: 29,132; Referee: Carlos del Cerro Grande (Spain)

27 August 2019 Second leg	Krasnodar (Russia)	1–2 (1–6 agg.)	(Greece) Olympiacos	Krasnodar, Russia
22:00	Utkin 10'; Stotsky (yellow card) 25'; Namli (yellow card) 70'; Olsson (yellow card) 75'; Spajić (yellow card) 76'	Report	El-Arabi 11', 48'	Stadium: Krasnodar Stadium; Attendance: 34,627; Referee: Damir Skomina (Slovenia)

==== Group stage ====
Pos	Team	Pld	W	D	L	GF	GA	GD	Pts	Qualification	BAY	TOT	OLY	RSB
1	(Germany) Bayern Munich	6	6	0	0	24	5	+19	18	Advance to knockout phase	—	3–1	2–0	3–0
2	(England) Tottenham Hotspur	6	3	1	2	18	14	+4	10	Advance to knockout phase	2–7	—	4–2	5–0
3	(Greece) Olympiacos	6	1	1	4	8	14	−6	4	Transfer to Europa League	2–3	2–2	—	1–0
4	(Serbia) Red Star Belgrade	6	1	0	5	3	20	−17	3		0–6	0–4	3–1	—

Source: UEFA
Rules for classification: Group stage tiebreakers

18 September 2019 1	Olympiacos (Greece)	2–2	(England) Tottenham Hotspur	Piraeus, Greece
19:55 EEST	Guilherme (yellow card) 14'; Podence 44'; Valbuena 54' (pen.)	Report	Kane 26' (pen.); Lucas Moura 30'; Winks (yellow card) 88'	Stadium: Karaiskakis Stadium; Attendance: 31,001; Referee: Gianluca Rocchi (Italy)

1 October 2019 2	Red Star Belgrade (Serbia)	3–1	(Greece) Olympiacos	Belgrade, Serbia
22:00 EEST	Rodić (yellow card) 26'; van La Parra (yellow card) 36'; Vulić 62'; Boakye (yellow card) 80', (goal) 90'; Petrović (yellow card) 83'; Milunović 87'; Marin (yellow card) 90'	Report	Semedo 37'; Benzia (yellow card) 42' (yellow-red card) 58'; Torosidis (yellow card) 90'	Stadium: Rajko Mitić Stadium; Attendance: 43,291; Referee: Benoît Bastien (France)

22 October 2019 3	Olympiacos (Greece)	2–3	(Germany) Bayern Munich	Piraeus, Greece
22:00 EEST	El-Arabi 23', (yellow card) 89'; Semedo (yellow card) 73'; Guilherme 79'	Report	Lewandowski 34', 62'; Thiago (yellow card) 50'; Neuer (yellow card) 71'; Tolisso 75'	Stadium: Karaiskakis Stadium; Attendance: 31,670; Referee: Danny Makkelie (Netherlands)

6 November 2019 4	Bayern Munich (Germany)	2–0	(Greece) Olympiacos	Munich, Germany
19:55 EET	Lewandowski 69'; Perišić 89'	Report		Stadium: Allianz Arena; Attendance: 63,646; Referee: Paweł Raczkowski (Poland)

26 November 2019 5	Tottenham Hotspur (England)	4–2	(Greece) Olympiacos	London, England
22:00 EET	Alli 45'; Kane 50', 77'; Alderweireld (yellow card) 61'; Aurier 73'	Report	El-Arabi 6'; Semedo 19', (yellow card) 39'; Bouchalakis (yellow card) 68'; Tsimikas (yellow card) 71'; Podence (yellow card) 75'	Stadium: Tottenham Hotspur Stadium; Attendance: 57,024; Referee: Georgi Kabakov (Bulgaria)

11 December 2019 6	Olympiacos (Greece)	1–0	(Serbia) Red Star Belgrade	Piraeus, Greece
22:00 EET	Camara (yellow card) 29'; Guilherme (yellow card) 42'; Podence (yellow card) 45'; El-Arabi 87' (pen.); Guerrero (yellow card) 90'	Report	Rodić (yellow card) 59'; Degenek (yellow card) 70'; Borjan (yellow card) 81'; Jander (yellow card) 86'	Stadium: Karaiskakis Stadium; Attendance: 31,898; Referee: Daniele Orsato (Italy)

=== UEFA Europa League ===
Win Draw Loss

==== Knockout phase ====
===== Round of 32 =====
20 February 2020 First leg	Olympiacos (Greece)	0–1	(England) Arsenal	Piraeus, Greece
22:00 EET	El-Arabi (yellow card) 19'; Semedo (yellow card) 26'; Bouchalakis (yellow card) 50'; Ba (yellow card) 90'	Report	Mustafi (yellow card) 71'; Lacazette 81'; Xhaka (yellow card) 83'	Stadium: Karaiskakis Stadium; Attendance: 31,456; Referee: Felix Zwayer (Germany)

27 February 2020 Second leg	Arsenal (England)	1–2 (a.e.t.) (2–2 (a) agg.)	(Greece) Olympiacos	London, England
22:00 EET	Aubameyang 113'	Report	Ba (yellow card) 21'; Cissé 53'; Camara (yellow card) 59'; El-Arabi 120'	Stadium: Emirates Stadium; Attendance: 60,242; Referee: Davide Massa (Italy)

===== Round of 16 =====
12 March 2020 First leg	Olympiacos (Greece)	1–1	(England) Wolverhampton Wanderers	Piraeus, Greece
22:00 EET	Semedo (red card) 29'; El-Arabi 54'; Sá (yellow card) 90'	Report	Doherty (yellow card) 8'; Coady (yellow card) 38'; Neto 67', (yellow card) 90'	Stadium: Karaiskakis Stadium; Attendance: 0 (closed doors); Referee: Clément Turpin (France)

6 August 2020 Second leg	Wolverhampton Wanderers (England)	1–0 (2–1 agg.)	(Greece) Olympiacos	Wolverhampton, England
22:00 EET	Jiménez 9' (pen.), (yellow card) 90'; Moutinho (yellow card) 38'; Podence (yellow card) 71'	Report	Tsimikas (yellow card) 45'; Ba (yellow card) 45'; Cissé (yellow card) 75'	Stadium: Molineux Stadium; Attendance: 0 (closed doors); Referee: Szymon Marciniak (Poland)

== Squad statistics ==
=== Appearances ===
As of match played 12 September 2020

No.	Pos.	Nat.	Name	Greek Super League	Greek Cup	UEFA Champions League	UEFA Europa League	Total
No.	Pos.	Nat.	Name	Apps	Apps	Apps	Apps	Apps
19	MF	(Greece)	Georgios Masouras	23(9)	4(1)	11(1)	3(1)	41(12)
5	MF	(Greece)	Andreas Bouchalakis	29(4)	3	12	4	48(4)
4	MF	(Guinea)	Mady Camara	27(4)	5	5(6)	4	41(10)
11	FW	(Morocco)	Youssef El-Arabi	30(4)	2(2)	4(5)	4	40(11)
1	GK	(Portugal)	José Sá	33	1	12	3	49
14	DF	(Norway)	Omar Elabdellaoui	27(1)	3	11(1)	4	45(2)
21	MF	(Greece)	Kostas Tsimikas	27	3	12	4	46
8	MF	(Brazil)	Guilherme	27	3(1)	11	4	45(1)
3	DF	(Portugal)	Rúben Semedo	27	3(1)	12	2	44(1)
28	MF	(France)	Mathieu Valbuena	20(6)	2(1)	7(2)	4	33(9)
97	MF	(Serbia)	Lazar Ranđelović	7(8)	4(2)	1(7)	1(1)	13(18)
24	DF	(Senegal)	Ousseynou Ba	22	2	0(1)	4	28(1)
22	MF	(Argentina)	Maximiliano Lovera	5(14)	5	1(2)	0(2)	11(18)
10	MF	(Portugal)	Daniel Podence	15	0	11(1)	0	26(1)
9	FW	(Spain)	Miguel Ángel Guerrero	3(11)	2	8(3)	0	13(14)
66	DF	(Senegal)	Pape Abou Cissé	10(3)	6	0(1)	2(1)	18(5)
2	MF	(Algeria)	Hillal Soudani	13(6)	0(1)	0(1)	0	13(8)
76	DF	(Angola)	Bruno Gaspar	10(5)	3(1)	0	0(2)	13(8)
7	MF	(Greece)	Kostas Fortounis	7(6)	2(3)	0	0(3)	9(12)
99	FW	(Egypt)	Ahmed Hassan	5(9)	3(1)	0	0(1)	8(11)
20	DF	(Tunisia)	Yassine Meriah	4(1)	2	11	0	17(1)
34	DF	(Greece)	Avraam Papadopoulos	9(3)	2	1	0(1)	12(4)
26	MF	(Portugal)	Cafú	3(4)	1(2)	0	0(1)	4(7)
35	DF	(Greece)	Vasilis Torosidis	3(3)	2	1(1)	0	6(4)
23	DF	(Greece)	Leonardo Koutris	4(2)	2	0(1)	0	6(3)
18	MF	(Brazil)	Bruno	2(5)	1	0(1)	0	3(6)
6	MF	(Algeria)	Yassine Benzia	1(4)	1	1(2)	0	3(6)
16	GK	(France)	Bobby Allain	3	4	0	1	8
77	MF	(Greece)	Lazaros Christodoulopoulos	0(6)	2	0	0	2(6)
81	GK	(Greece)	Konstantinos Tzolakis	0(1)	2	0	0	2(1)
57	MF	(Greece)	Giorgos Xenitidis	0(1)	1(1)	0	0	1(2)
15	DF	(Serbia)	Svetozar Marković	0	1(1)	0	0	1(1)
10	MF	(Turkey)	Emre Mor	0	0(2)	0	0	0(2)
44	GK	(Greece)	Ilias Karargyris	0(1)	0	0	0	0(1)
90	MF	(Greece)	Vasilis Sourlis	0(1)	0	0	0	0(1)
88	DF	(Greece)	Apostolos Martinis	0(1)	0	0	0	0(1)
29	MF	(Serbia)	Kristijan Belić	0	0(1)	0	0	0(1)
27	MF	(Greece)	Christos Liatsos	0	0(1)	0	0	0(1)

=== Goalscorers ===
As of match played 12 September 2020

No.	Pos.	Nat.	Name	Greek Super League	Greek Cup	UEFA Champions League	UEFA Europa League	Total
No.	Pos.	Nat.	Name	Goals	Goals	Goals	Goals	Goals
11	FW	(Morocco)	Youssef El-Arabi	20	0	5	2	27
19	MF	(Greece)	Georgios Masouras	9	1	1	0	11
28	MF	(France)	Mathieu Valbuena	7	0	2	0	9
99	FW	(Egypt)	Ahmed Hassan	6	2	0	0	8
8	MF	(Brazil)	Guilherme	3	1	3	0	7
2	MF	(Algeria)	Hillal Soudani	7	0	0	0	7
4	MF	(Guinea)	Mady Camara	6	1	0	0	7
9	FW	(Spain)	Miguel Ángel Guerrero	2	2	2	0	6
97	MF	(Serbia)	Lazar Ranđelović	2	2	2	0	6
10	MF	(Portugal)	Daniel Podence	3	0	2	0	5
3	DF	(Portugal)	Rúben Semedo	1	0	4	0	5
7	MF	(Greece)	Kostas Fortounis	3	0	0	0	3
66	DF	(Senegal)	Pape Abou Cissé	0	2	0	1	3
22	MF	(Argentina)	Maximiliano Lovera	0	2	0	0	2
5	MF	(Greece)	Andreas Bouchalakis	1	0	0	0	1
26	MF	(Portugal)	Cafú	1	0	0	0	1
14	DF	(Norway)	Omar Elabdellaoui	1	0	0	0	1
77	MF	(Greece)	Lazaros Christodoulopoulos	0	1	0	0	1

Own Goals: 2

== Individual Awards ==
Name	Pos.	Award
(Portugal) Pedro Martins	Manager	Super League Greece Manager of the Season
(Morocco) Youssef El-Arabi	Forward	Olympiacos Player of the Season; Super League Greece Golden Boot; Super League Greece Best Foreign Player; Super League Greece Team of the Season; Super League Greece Player of the Month January 2020
(Greece) Kostas Tsimikas	Left-Back	Super League Greece Greek Footballer of the Season; Super League Greece Team of the Season
(Portugal) José Sá	Goalkeeper	Super League Greece Goalkeeper of the Season; Super League Greece Team of the Season
(France) Mathieu Valbuena	Winger	Super League Greece Player of the Month September 2019; Super League Greece Team of the Season
(Norway) Omar Elabdellaoui	Right-back	Super League Greece Team of the Season
(Portugal) Rúben Semedo	Centre-back	Super League Greece Team of the Season
