= Fodé Camara (footballer, born 1998) =

Guinean footballer (born 1998)

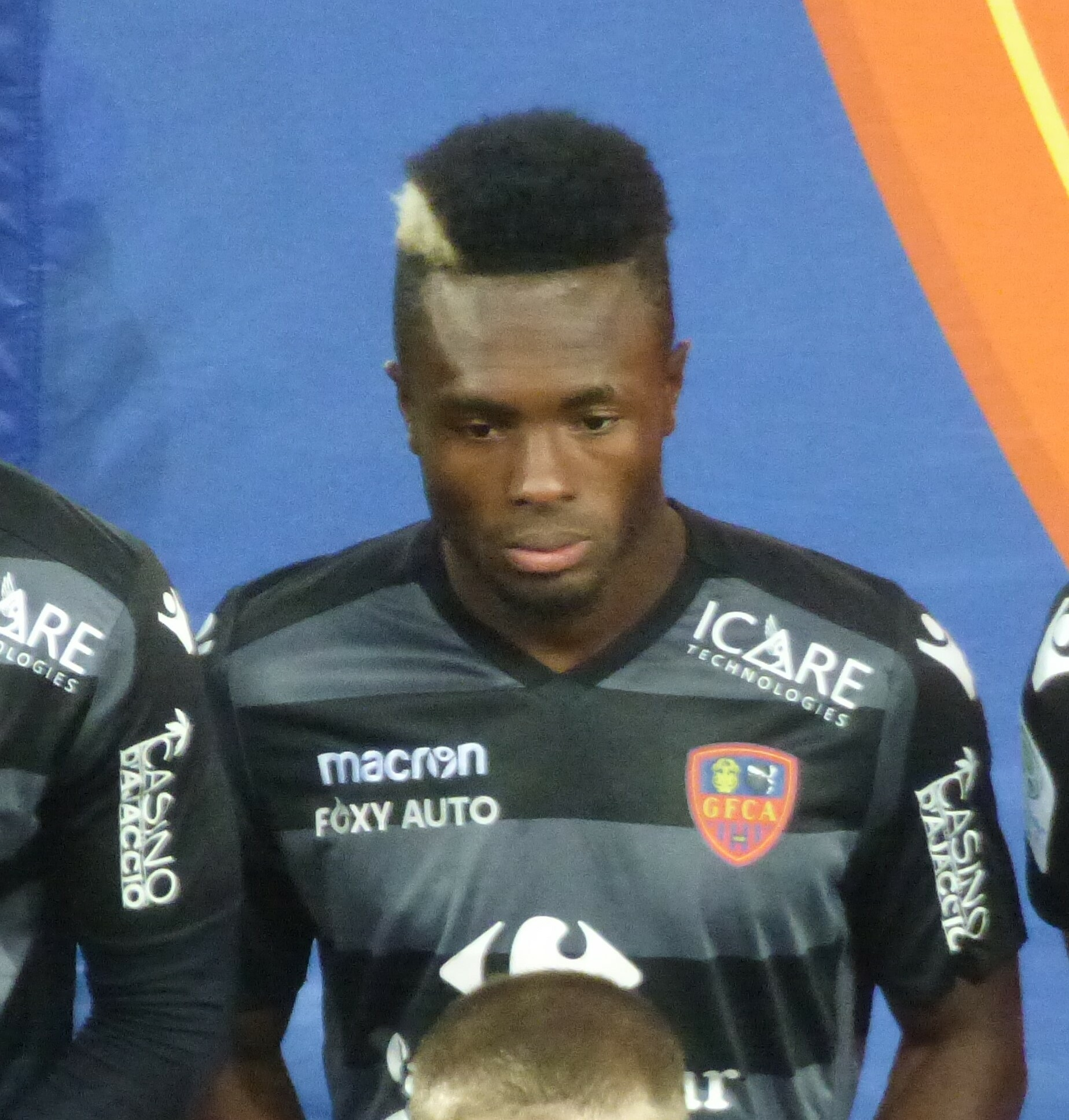
- Camara with Gazélec Ajaccio in 2018

Personal information
- Date of birth: 17 April 1998 (age 28)
- Place of birth: Conakry, Guinea
- Height: 1.67 m (5 ft 6 in)
- Position: Left-back

Team information
- Current team: CS Grevenmacher

Youth career
- 2014–2016: CEFOMIG
- 2016–2018: Bastia

Senior career*
Years	Team	Apps	(Gls)
2016–2017	Bastia B	1	(0)
2017–2018	Bastia	18	(0)
2018–2019	Gazélec Ajaccio	34	(0)
2019–2021	Olympiacos	0	(0)
2019–2020	→ Gazélec Ajaccio (loan)	8	(0)
2020–2021	→ Chania (loan)	12	(1)
2021–2022	Chania	20	(1)
2023–2024	Novi Sad	8	(0)
2023–2024	Zimbru Chișinău	5	(1)
2026–	Grevenmacher	0	(0)

International career^{‡}
2015	Guinea U17	8	(0)
- * Club domestic league appearances and goals as of 15 June 2024 ‡ National team caps and goals as of 12 August 2020

Fodé Camara (born 17 April 1998) is a Guinean professional footballer who plays as a left-back for Luxembourgish club CS Grevenmacher.

== Club career ==
Born in Guinea, Camara went through the CEFOMIG youth academy before moving to SC Bastia in 2016. On 13 June 2018, he joined Gazélec Ajaccio on a three-year deal from Bastia. He made his professional debut for Gazélec Ajaccio in a 1–1 Ligue 2 tie with Paris FC on 27 July 2018.

On 9 July 2019, Camara signed with Greek champions Olympiacos F.C. who loaned him back to Gazélec Ajaccio for the 2019–20 season.

In September 2020, he moved to Super League Greece 2 side Chania FC on loan for the 2020–21 season, along with teammate Nemanja Nikolić.

On 10 February 2023, he signed for Novi Sad as a free agent. In September 2023, Camara signed with Moldovan club Zimbru Chișinău.

In January 2026 he signed for CS Grevenmacher in Luxembourg.

== International career ==
Camara represented the Guinea U17s at the 2015 African U-17 Championship, and the 2015 FIFA U-17 World Cup.
