= Saša Urošević =

Croatian footballer (born 1999)

Personal information
- Date of birth: 26 January 1999 (age 27)
- Place of birth: Pula, Croatia
- Position: Midfielder

Team information
- Current team: Ližnjan

Youth career
- –2010: NK Štinjan
- 2010–2018: Istra 1961

Senior career*
Years	Team	Apps	(Gls)
2015–2018	Istra 1961	6	(0)
2018–2019	Novigrad		
2019–2021	Rudar Labin		
2021	Uljanik		
2022–	Ližnjan		
- * Club domestic league appearances and goals as of 2 January 2019

Saša Urošević (born 26 January 1999) is a Croatian football player who plays for Ližnjan.

== Career ==
He made his professional debut in the Croatian First Football League for NK Istra 1961 on 17 February 2017, in a game against NK Lokomotiva.

In the summer of 2018 he left the club for third-tier NK Novigrad. In July 2019, he joined NK Rudar Labin.
