= Alessandro Eleuteri =

Italian footballer (born 1998)

Personal information
- Date of birth: 8 June 1998 (age 28)
- Place of birth: San Benedetto del Tronto, Italy
- Height: 1.81 m (5 ft 11 in)
- Positions: Right back; right winger

Team information
- Current team: Recanatese
- Number: 27

Youth career
- –2017: Ascoli
- 2014–2016: → Juventus (loan)
- 2017: Atalanta

Senior career*
Years	Team	Apps	(Gls)
2014	Ascoli	2	(0)
2017–2020	Atalanta	0	(0)
2017–2018	→ Pistoiese (loan)	9	(0)
2018	→ Monopoli (loan)	2	(0)
2018–2019	→ Ravenna (loan)	37	(0)
2019–2020	→ Feralpisalò (loan)	12	(0)
2020	→ Alessandria (loan)	5	(0)
2020–2022	Vis Pesaro	25	(0)
2021	→ Carpi (loan)	12	(1)
2022–2024	Fermana	60	(0)
2024–2025	Renate	22	(1)
2026–	Recanatese	0	(0)

International career
2014	Italy U-l16	4	(0)
2015	Italy U17	5	(0)
- * Club domestic league appearances and goals as of 20 February 2026

Alessandro Eleuteri (born 8 June 1998) is an Italian footballer who plays as a right back for Recanatese.

== Club career ==
=== Ascoli ===
Born in San Benedetto del Tronto, Eleuteri started his career in Ascoli. On 6 April 2014 he made his professional debut in Serie C for Ascoli as a substitute replacing Lion Giovannini in the 86th minute of a 3–0 away win over Prato. Three week later, on 27 April he played his second match for Ascoli, again as a substitute replacing Matteo Minnozzi in the 73rd minute of a 1–0 away defeat against Gubbio.

=== Atalanta ===
After spending 2 years in the Juventus youth team he joined to Atalanta Primavera for the second half of the 2016–17 season where he made 8 appearances.

==== Loan to Pistoiese and Monopoli ====
On 14 July 2017, Eleuteri was signed by Serie C side Pistoiese on a season-long loan deal. On 24 September he made his Serie C debut for Pistoiese as a substitute replacing Juan Surraco in the 88th minute of a 2–0 away defeat against Livorno. In January 2018, Eleuteri returned to Atalanta leaving Pistoiese with only 9 appearances, all as a substitute.

On 23 January 2018, Eleuteri was loaned to Monopoli on a 6-month loan deal. On 8 April he made his debut in Serie C for Monopoli as a substitute replacing Leonardo Longo in the 85th minute of a 2–0 home win over Bisceglie. One week later, on 15 April he made his second appearances for Monopoli, again as a substitute replacing Leonardo Longo in the 84th minute of a 2–1 away defeat against Juve Stabia. Eleuteri ended his loan with only 2 appearances, both as a substitute.

==== Loan to Ravenna ====
On 12 July 2018, Eleuteri was loaned to Serie C club Ravenna on a season-long loan deal.

==== Loan to Feralpisalò ====
On 12 July 2019, he joined Serie C club Feralpisalò on loan.

==== Loan to Alessandria ====
On 16 January 2020, he was loaned to Alessandria until the end of the season.

=== Vis Pesaro ===
On 31 August 2020, he joined Vis Pesaro on a 3-year contract.

==== Loan to Carpi ====
On 29 January 2021, he was loaned to Carpi until the end of the 2020–21 season.

=== Fermana ===
On 19 August 2022, Eleuteri signed a two-year contract with Fermana.

== Career statistics ==
=== Club ===
As of 29 May 2018

Club	Season	League			Cup		Europe		Other		Total	
Club	Season	League	Apps	Goals	Apps	Goals	Apps	Goals	Apps	Goals	Apps	Goals
Pistoiese (loan)	2017–18	Serie C	9	0	0	0	—		—		9	0
Monopoli (loan)	2017–18	Serie C	2	0	—		—		—		2	0
Ravenna (loan)	2018–19	Serie C	0	0	0	0	—		—		0	0
Career total			11	0	0	0	—		—		11	0

== Honours ==
=== Club ===
Juventus Primavera

- Torneo di Viareggio: 2016
