= Antonis Fouasis =

Greek footballer

Personal information
- Full name: Antonios Fouasis
- Date of birth: 13 June 1998 (age 28)
- Place of birth: Syros, Greece
- Height: 1.73 m (5 ft 8 in)
- Position: Left-back

Youth career
- Olympiacos

Senior career*
Years	Team	Apps	(Gls)
2017–2018	Olympiacos	0	(0)
2017–2018	→ Chania (loan)	8	(0)
2018–2019	Kalamata		
2019–2020	Panthiraikos		
2020–2021	Ierapetra	23	(1)
2021–2022	Panserraikos	16	(0)
2022–2023	Irodotos	2	(0)
2023	Marko		
2023–2024	Vyzas		
2024–2025	Ionikos		

International career^{‡}
2015	Greece U17	2	(0)
2016–2017	Greece U19	6	(0)
2018	Greece U20	2	(0)
- * Club domestic league appearances and goals as of 20 November 2022 ‡ National team caps and goals as of 11 January 2018

Antonis Fouasis (Greek: Αντώνης Φουάσης; born 13 June 1998) is a Greek professional footballer who plays as a left-back.
