= Stathis Lamprou =

Greek footballer

Personal information
- Full name: Efstathios Lamprou
- Date of birth: 20 September 1998 (age 28)
- Place of birth: Chalcis, Greece
- Height: 1.77 m (5 ft 10 in)
- Position: Defensive midfielder

Team information
- Current team: Ethnikos Asteras

Youth career
- 2012–2017: Olympiacos

Senior career*
| Years | Team | Apps | (Gls) |
| 2017–2018 | Olympiacos | 0 | (0) |
| 2018–2019 | Aittitos Spata | 14 | (0) |
| 2019–2020 | Egaleo | 17 | (0) |
| 2020–2021 | Santorini 2020 | 12 | (0) |
| 2021–2022 | AO Karavas | | |
| 2022–2023 | Agios Nikolaos | | |
| 2023 | A.E. Moschatou | | |
| 2023–2025 | Nea Artaki | | |
| 2025– | Ethnikos Asteras | | |

International career^{‡}
| 2014–2015 | Greece U17 | 13 | (0) |
| 2016–2017 | Greece U19 | 10 | (0) |
| 2018 | Greece U20 | 2 | (0) |
| 2017–2018 | Greece U21 | 1 | (0) |
- * Club domestic league appearances and goals as of 18 August 2020 ‡ National team caps and goals as of 11 January 2018

Stathis Lamprou (Greek: Στάθης Λάμπρου; born 20 September 1998) is a Greek professional footballer who plays as a defensive midfielder.
