= Vitja Valenčič =

Slovenian footballer

Personal information
- Date of birth: 12 March 1999 (age 27)
- Place of birth: Ljubljana, Slovenia
- Height: 1.77 m (5 ft 10 in)
- Position: Midfielder

Youth career
- –2015: Olimpija Ljubljana
- 2015–2018: Fiorentina

Senior career*
Years	Team	Apps	(Gls)
2018	Fiorentina	0	(0)
2018–2022	Olimpija Ljubljana	35	(1)

International career
2014	Slovenia U16	2	(3)
2014–2016	Slovenia U17	26	(2)
2015–2017	Slovenia U18	6	(1)
2016	Slovenia U19	5	(0)
2019	Slovenia U21	6	(0)
- * Club domestic league appearances and goals as of 5 July 2022

Vitja Valenčič (born 12 March 1999) is a Slovenian footballer who plays as a midfielder.

== Career ==
In 2018, Valenčič signed for Olimpija Ljubljana in the Slovenian top flight from Italian Serie A side Fiorentina.

== Honours ==
Olimpija Ljubljana

- Slovenian Cup: 2018–19, 2020–21
