= Nemanja Nikolić (footballer, born 2001) =

Bosnian association footballer

Personal information
- Date of birth: 21 February 2001 (age 25)
- Place of birth: Zvornik, Bosnia and Herzegovina
- Height: 1.80 m (5 ft 11 in)
- Position: Right-back

Team information
- Current team: Manama Club

Youth career
- 2016–2018: Sarajevo

Senior career*
Years	Team	Apps	(Gls)
2018–2019	Mladost Doboj Kakanj	24	(0)
2019–2023	Olympiacos	0	(0)
2019	→ Radnički Niš (loan)	1	(0)
2020	→ Mladost Doboj Kakanj (loan)	3	(0)
2020–2021	→ Chania (loan)	10	(1)
2021–2023	Olympiacos B	41	(2)
2023–2024	Chania	17	(3)
2024–2025	Athens Kallithea	2	(0)
2025–	Manama Club	0	(0)

International career^{‡}
2017–2018	Bosnia and Herzegovina U17	11	(1)
2019	Bosnia and Herzegovina U21	1	(0)
- * Club domestic league appearances and goals as of 18 June 2025 ‡ National team caps and goals as of 5 June 2019

Nemanja Nikolić (Bosnian pronunciation: [němaɲa nǐkolitɕ]; born 21 February 2001) is a Bosnian professional footballer who plays as a right-back.

He started his professional career at Mladost Doboj Kakanj, before joining Olympiacos in 2019, who loaned him to Radnički Niš later that year and to Mladost Doboj Kakanj in 2020.

== Club career ==
=== Early career ===
Nikolić came through Sarajevo's youth academy, which he left in June 2018 to join Mladost Doboj Kakanj. He made his professional debut against Radnik Bijeljina on 18 August 2018 at the age of 17.

=== Olympiacos ===
In August 2019, Nikolić joined Greek side Olympiacos on a four-year contract, but he was immediately loaned to Serbian team Radnički Niš until the end of the season.

In January 2020, he was sent on a six-month loan to his former club Mladost Doboj Kakanj.

== International career ==
Nikolić represented Bosnia and Herzegovina at various youth levels.

== Career statistics ==
=== Club ===
As of match played 21 October 2024

Club	Season	League			Cup		Continental		Other		Total	
Club	Season	Division	Apps	Goals	Apps	Goals	Apps	Goals	Apps	Goals	Apps	Goals
Mladost Doboj Kakanj	2018–19	Bosnian Premier League	19	0	0	0	—		—		19	0
Mladost Doboj Kakanj	2019–20	Bosnian Premier League	5	0	0	0	—		—		5	0
Mladost Doboj Kakanj	Total		24	0	0	0	—		—		24	0
Radnički Niš (loan)	2019–20	Serbian SuperLiga	1	0	2	0	—		—		3	0
Mladost Doboj Kakanj (loan)	2019–20	Bosnian Premier League	3	0	0	0	—		—		3	0
Chania (loan)	2020–21	Superleague Greece 2	10	1	0	0	—		—		10	1
Olympiacos B	2021–22	Superleague Greece 2	21	1	—		—		—		21	1
Olympiacos B	2022–23	Superleague Greece 2	21	1	—		—		—		21	1
Olympiacos B	Total		42	2	—		—		—		42	2
Chania	2023–24	Superleague Greece 2	19	3	3	0	—		—		22	3
Athens Kallithea	2024–25	Superleague Greece 2	1	0	1	0	—		—		2	0
Career total			100	6	6	0	0	0	0	0	106	6
