= Spyros Natsos =

Greek footballer

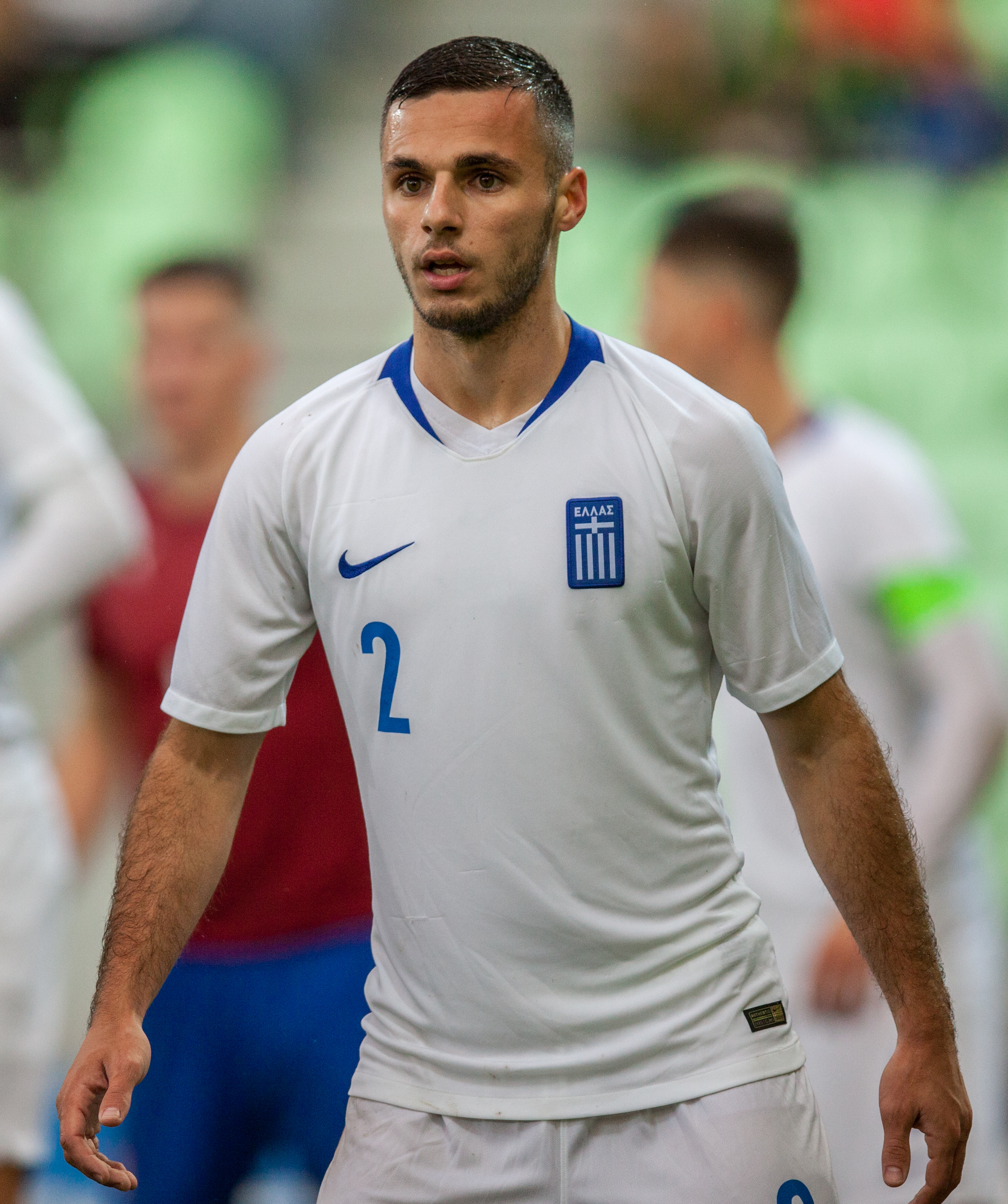
- Natsos with Greece U21 in 2019

Personal information
- Full name: Spyridon Natsos
- Date of birth: 9 June 1998 (age 28)
- Place of birth: Preveza, Greece
- Height: 1.75 m (5 ft 9 in)
- Position: Midfielder

Team information
- Current team: Chania

Youth career
- 2012–2015: Atromitos

Senior career*
Years	Team	Apps	(Gls)
2015–2022	Atromitos	61	(2)
2022–2023	Panserraikos	2	(0)
2023–2024	Kozani	26	(2)
2024–2026	Hellas Syros	24	(1)
2026	Zakynthos	2	(0)
2026–	Chania		

International career^{‡}
2014–2015	Greece U17	13	(0)
2016–2017	Greece U19	13	(0)
2018–2019	Greece U21	7	(0)
- * Club domestic league appearances and goals as of 12 September 2026 ‡ National team caps and goals as of 15 November 2019

Spyros Natsos (Greek: Σπύρος Νάτσος; born 9 June 1998) is a Greek professional footballer who plays as a midfielder for Gamma Ethniki club Chania.

== Career ==
=== Atromitos ===
On 8 February 2020, Natsos signed a contract extension with Atromitos until the summer of 2022.

=== Panserraikos ===
On 4 July 2022, he joined Panserraikos on a two-year deal.

== Career statistics ==
As of 15 August 2023

Club	Season	League			Cup		Continental		Other		Total	
Club	Season	Division	Apps	Goals	Apps	Goals	Apps	Goals	Apps	Goals	Apps	Goals
Atromitos	2016–17	Super League Greece	1	0	3	0	—		—		4	0
Atromitos	2017–18	Super League Greece	4	0	4	0	—		—		8	0
Atromitos	2018–19	Super League Greece	9	0	3	0	1	0	—		13	0
Atromitos	2019–20	Super League Greece	14	1	1	0	4	0	—		19	1
Atromitos	2020–21	Super League Greece	23	1	2	0	—		—		25	2
Atromitos	2021–22	Super League Greece	10	0	1	0	—		—		11	0
Atromitos	Total		61	2	14	0	5	0	—		80	2
Panserraikos	2022–23	Super League Greece 2	2	0	2	0	—		—		4	0
Career total			63	2	16	0	5	0	0	0	84	2
