= 2024–25 AEK Athens F.C. season =

AEK Athens
2024–25 season
- Chairman: Evangelos Aslanidis
- Manager: Matías Almeyda
- Stadium: Agia Sophia Stadium
- Super League: 4th (After play-offs); 2nd (Regular season)
- Greek Cup: Semi-finals
- UEFA Conference League: Third qualifying round
- Top goalscorer: League: Anthony Martial (7); All: Levi García (10)
- Highest home attendance: 30,950 (vs PAOK) (20 October 2024)
- Lowest home attendance: 11,468 (vs Noah) (15 August 2024)
- Average home league attendance: 23,943
- Biggest win: AEK Athens 5–0 Panserraikos
- Biggest defeat: Olympiacos 6–0 AEK Athens
Home colours	Away colours	Third colours

The 2024–25 season was the 101st season in the existence of AEK Athens F.C. and the 64th competitive season and tenth consecutive in the top flight of Greek football. They competed in the Super League, the Greek Cup and the Conference League. The season began on 24 July 2024 and finished on 11 May 2025.

== Kits ==
Supplier: Nike
Sponsor(s): Pame stoixima
Features: Seajets, LG Corp, Piraeus Bank

Home	Away	Third

== Overview ==
Following the unexpected loss of the previous season's championship, the club, as well as its supporters were trying to recover from the shock. Furthermore, on 10 June, Dimitris Melissanidis announced his departure from the club's ownership after 11 years, which handed it over to shipowner, Marios Iliopoulos. The new administration left full control of the transfers to Matías Almeyda and proceeded with the signings of prominent footballers, such as Thomas Strakosha, Roberto Pereyra, Erik Lamela, Aboubakary Koïta and most notably Anthony Martial, while from the domestic market they signed Alberto Brignoli, Moses Odubajo and Sotiris Tsiloulis. Among the departures were Georgios Athanasiadis, Djibril Sidibé, Tom van Weert, Ezequiel Ponce and most notably their captain for the past two seasons, Sergio Araujo. However, Iliopoulos after two months at the wheel, reorganized the football department of the club by appointing Javier Ribalta as its director.

AEK began their European journey in the second qualifying round of the UEFA Conference League by facing Inter Club d'Escaldes. Despite a problematic 4–3 victory at home, they secured the qualification in the rematch with a 0–3 win. In the following round, AEK came across Noah. After a shameful performance at Armavir City Stadium, which resulted in a 3–1 defeat, they were eventually eliminated by the Armenian club, following their 1–0 win at Agia Sophia Stadium. The early elimination of the club sparked doubts about Almeyda.

The differences between the philosophies of Almeyda and Ribalta became evident during the winter transfer window, when Konstantinos Galanopoulos, Nordin Amrabat, Steven Zuber and Levi García left the club, but no gaps within the roster were filled, as the club did not make any signings whatsoever.

In the championship, AEK displayed great performances at times, but two consecutive away defeats removed them from the top of the table. AEK were suffering from constant injuries of key players, as well as by the way they were treated by Greek referees during their matches. The combination of these negatively affected the high-pressure playing style that Almeyda was applying throughout his previous seasons within the team. Furthermore, on 26 November, AEK faced Olympiacos at Karaiskakis Stadium and suffered an embarrassing 4–1 defeat that showed that the playing style of Almeyda was no longer unmatched. The defeat was met by further doubts for the manager, but the majority of the supporters continued to support the club and Almeyda, which was proved at the 4–0 home win over Aris in the following matchday. However, on 19 January 2025, after a 1–0 defeat to Panathinaikos, Almeyda spoke with uncertainty about his future at the club. This resulted in an arrangement of a meeting between Almeyda and Iliopoulos, where it was decided that the Argentine manager would continue at the club. Afterwards, AEK displaying consistent performances, achieved a five-match winning streak and emerged as the only title contenders, behind Olympiacos. One of these was a 2–1 win at Toumba Stadium, where Lamela scored both goals, while the first was voted as goal of the season in the Super League. Their hopes of claiming any title in the season collapsed, when AEK lost at home to Olympiacos in the penultimate matchday.

As in the previous season, AEK entered the Cup at the round of 16, facing Aris. This time however, they managed to overcome their opponent and with a 1–0 win in Athens and a 1–1 draw in Thessaloniki, they qualified to the next round. In the quarter-finals, they came against PAOK. After the end of the match at Nea Filadelfeia Stadium which ended 1–0 for the yellow-blacks, the officials of PAOK reported an attack on their bus by ultras in the parking of the stadium. However, as the security cameras showed, while the squad of PAOK were departing, three supporters of AEK were showing to the squad a yellow-black shirt of the 2018 championship conquest. The officials of PAOK, starring their manager Răzvan Lucescu, got off the bus in a furious state and physically and verbally attacked the three supporters. The Romanian manager and four other members of the staff were punished with a 4-month ban from the stadiums, which was reduced on appeal to 45 days. In the rematch, PAOK managed to equalize the score of the first match, which sent the match to extra time, however, AEK eventually achieved qualification at the 107th minute, with a goal by Odubajo. In the semi-finals, AEK faced Olympiacos. The first match at Piraeus was a complete disaster, as AEK appeared completely unprepared, both competitively and mentally and made lots of mistakes, which Olympiacos took advantage of and scored six goals from as many shots on target. The rematch at Nea Filadelfeia was merely procedural and AEK won by 2–0. The harsh elimination caused a rift among the supporters of AEK referring the presence of Almeyda at the team's bench.

In the play-offs, Olympiacos had gained a 7-point lead over second-placed AEK and the big interest was the final standings and the tickets for European competitions. Even though AEK started with a significant 4-point lead over Panathinaikos and a 7-point lead over PAOK respectively, the situation created by the negative results against Olympiacos, resulted in the team being in a mental and competitive collapse. Thus, AEK finished at the fourth place, losing all six matches of the round, achieving a negative record. After the end of the season, Almeyda met for the last time with Iliopoulos and the following day his contract was terminated. Despite the negative situation, the Argentine manager he had a warm farewell from the ultras at the airport.

== Management team ==
Position	Staff
Manager	(Argentina) Matías Almeyda
Assistant manager	(Argentina) Daniel Vega
Goalkeeping coach	(Argentina) Carlos Roa
Fitness coach	(Argentina) Guido Bonini
Fitness coach	(Greece) Kostas Parousis
Fitness coach	(Greece) Sotiris Mavros
Director of Football	(Spain) Javier Ribalta
Technical director	(Poland) Radosław Kucharski
Sporting director	(Portugal) Bruno Alves
Scout	(Greece) Stamoulis Petrou
Scout	(Greece) Dimitrios Xouris
Scout	(Greece) Fanouris Goundoulakis
Academy manager	(Serbia) Ivan Nedeljković
Head of Medical	(Greece) Lakis Nikolaou

- Source: aekfc.gr

== Players ==
=== Squad information ===
NOTE: The players are the ones that have been announced by the AEK Athens' press release. No edits should be made unless a player's arrival or exit is announced. Updated 11 May 2025, 23:59 UTC+3.

No.	Player	Nat.	Position(s)	Date of birth (Age)	Signed	Previous club	Transfer fee	Contract until
Goalkeepers
1	Thomas Strakosha	(Albania) (Greece)	GK	19 March 1995 (aged 30)	2024	(England) Brentford	Free	2029
91	Alberto Brignoli	(Italy)	GK	19 August 1991 (aged 33)	2024	(Greece) Panathinaikos	Free	2027
—	Cican Stanković	(Austria)	GK	4 November 1992 (aged 32)	2021	(Austria) Red Bull Salzburg	€1,150,000	2025
Defenders
2	Harold Moukoudi	(Cameroon) (France)	CB	27 November 1997 (aged 27)	2022	(France) Saint-Étienne	Free	2028
3	Stavros Pilios	(Greece) (Albania)	LB / LM	10 December 2000 (aged 24)	2023	(Greece) PAS Giannina	Free	2027
12	Lazaros Rota	(Greece) (Albania)	RB / RM	23 August 1997 (aged 27)	2021	(Netherlands) Fortuna Sittard	Free	2026
18	Alexander Callens	(Peru) (Spain)	CB / LB	4 May 1992 (aged 33)	2024	(Spain) Girona	€300,000	2026
21	Domagoj Vida (Captain)	(Croatia)	CB / RB	29 April 1989 (aged 36)	2022	(Turkey) Beşiktaş	Free	2026
24	Gerasimos Mitoglou	(Greece)	CB	20 October 1999 (aged 25)	2021	(Greece) Volos	€300,000	2026
28	Ehsan Hajsafi	(Iran)	LB / LM / LW / AM / CM / DM	25 February 1990 (aged 35)	2021	(Iran) Sepahan	Free	2025
29	Moses Odubajo	(England) (Nigeria)	RB / RM / LB / LM	28 July 1993 (aged 31)	2024	(Greece) Aris	€1,000,000	2026
Midfielders
4	Damian Szymański (Vice-captain)	(Poland)	DM / CM / AM / CB	16 June 1995 (aged 30)	2020	(Russia) Akhmat Grozny	€1,300,000	2027
6	Jens Jønsson	(Denmark)	DM / CM / CB	10 January 1993 (aged 32)	2022	(Spain) Cádiz	Free	2026
8	Mijat Gaćinović	(Serbia) (Bosnia and Herzegovina)	AM / CM / LM / LW / RM / RW	8 February 1995 (aged 30)	2022	(Germany) Hoffenheim	€1,000,000	2026
13	Orbelín Pineda	(Mexico)	AM / CM / LM / LW / RM / RW / SS / DM / RB	24 March 1996 (aged 29)	2023	(Spain) Celta de Vigo	€6,500,000	2027
19	Niclas Eliasson	(Sweden) (Brazil)	RM / LM / RW / LW	7 December 1995 (aged 29)	2022	(France) Nîmes	€2,000,000	2028
20	Petros Mantalos (Vice-captain 3)	(Greece)	AM / LM / CM / LW / SS / RM / RW	31 August 1991 (aged 33)	2014	(Greece) Xanthi	€500,000	2026
22	Paolo Fernandes	(Spain)	AM / RM / LM / RW / LW	19 August 1998 (aged 26)	2023	(Greece) Volos	€700,000	2027
23	Robert Ljubičić	(Croatia) (Austria)	CM / RM / LM / AM / DM / LB	14 July 1999 (aged 25)	2024	(Croatia) Dinamo Zagreb	€4,000,000	2029
37	Roberto Pereyra	(Argentina)	CM / AM / LM / RM / SS	7 January 1991 (aged 34)	2024	(Italy) Udinese	Free	2026
Forwards
9	Erik Lamela	(Argentina)	RW / LW / SS / RM / LM / AM	4 March 1992 (aged 33)	2024	(Spain) Sevilla	Free	2027
11	Aboubakary Koïta	(Mauritania) (Belgium)	LW / LM / SS / ST / RW / RM	20 September 1998 (aged 26)	2024	(Belgium) Sint-Truidense	€4,000,000	2029
14	Frantzdy Pierrot	(Haiti) (United States)	ST	29 March 1995 (aged 30)	2024	(Israel) Maccabi Haifa	€2,500,000	2027
16	Sotiris Tsiloulis	(Greece)	RW / LW / RM / LM / AM / ST / SS / CM	14 February 1995 (aged 30)	2024	(Greece) Lamia	Free	2026
26	Anthony Martial	(France)	ST / RW / LW	5 December 1995 (aged 29)	2024	(England) Manchester United	Free	2027
Left during Winter Transfer Window
69	Dimitris Goumas	(Greece) (Germany)	GK	4 November 2003 (aged 21)	2024	(Germany) SpVgg Greuther Fürth II	Free	2027
25	Konstantinos Galanopoulos (Vice-captain 2)	(Greece)	CM / DM	28 December 1997 (aged 27)	2015	(Greece) AEK Athens U20	—	2025
5	Nordin Amrabat	(Morocco) (Netherlands)	RW / LW / RM / LM / AM / SS / ST	31 March 1987 (aged 38)	2021	(Saudi Arabia) Al Nassr	Free	2025
7	Levi García	(Trinidad and Tobago)	ST / RW / RM / SS / LW / LM	20 November 1997 (aged 27)	2020	(Israel) Beitar Jerusalem	€2,600,000	2028
10	Steven Zuber	(Switzerland)	LW / LM / SS / ST / AM / RW / RM	17 August 1991 (aged 33)	2022	(Germany) Eintracht Frankfurt	€1,600,000	2025
From AEK Athens B
81	Angelos Angelopoulos	(Greece)	GK	19 February 2003 (aged 22)	2021	(Greece) AEK Athens U19	—	2025
99	Georgios Theocharis	(Greece)	GK	30 June 2002 (aged 23)	2020	(Greece) AEK Athens U19	—	2025
34	Christos Kosidis	(Greece)	CB / RB	28 February 2005 (aged 20)	2023	(Greece) AEK Athens U19	—	2026
75	Christos Giannoulis	(Greece)	LB	8 October 2004 (aged 20)	2024	(Greece) AEK Athens U19	—	2029
33	Loukas Maroutsis	(Greece)	DM / CM	15 May 2006 (aged 19)	2024	(Greece) AEK Athens U19	—	2029
73	Christoforos Kolimatsis	(Greece)	DM / CM	4 August 2006 (aged 18)	2024	(Greece) AEK Athens U19	—	2029
80	Hamed Kader Fofana	(Ivory Coast)	CM / DM	7 December 2004 (aged 20)	2024	(Ivory Coast) Ivoire FC	Free	2029
97	Judah García	(Trinidad and Tobago)	AM / RW / RM / LM / LW / CM	24 October 2000 (aged 24)	2021	(India) NEROCA	Free	2025
32	Elián Sosa	(Argentina)	RW / RM / LM / LW / AM	14 May 2003 (aged 22)	2024	(Argentina) Defensa y Justicia	Free	2028
44	Donaldoni Zambou Nguemechieu	(Cameroon)	LW / RW / ST	10 October 2002 (aged 22)	2024	(Greece) Tilikratis	—	2026
82	Spyros Skondras	(Greece)	LW / LM	6 April 2001 (aged 24)	2022	(Greece) Panetolikos	Free	2025
98	Dimitrios Theodoridis	(Greece)	ST	8 August 2002 (aged 22)	2024	(Greece) AO Chaniotis	Free	2025

== Transfers ==
=== In ===
==== Summer ====
No.	Pos.	Player	From	Fee	Date	Contract Until	Source
1	GK	(Albania) Thomas Strakosha	(England) Brentford	Free transfer	8 July 2024	30 June 2029	
9	FW	(Argentina) Erik Lamela	(Spain) Sevilla	Free transfer	21 July 2024	30 June 2027	
11	FW	(Mauritania) Aboubakary Koïta	(Belgium) Sint-Truidense	€4,000,000^{[a]}	13 July 2024	30 June 2029	
14	FW	(Haiti) Frantzdy Pierrot	(Israel) Maccabi Haifa	€2,500,000	10 September 2024	30 June 2027	
16	FW	(Greece) Sotiris Tsiloulis	(Greece) Lamia	Free transfer	1 July 2024	30 June 2026	
18	DF	(Peru) Alexander Callens	(Spain) Girona	€300,000	1 July 2024	30 June 2026	
26	FW	(France) Anthony Martial	(England) Manchester United	Free transfer	19 September 2024	30 June 2027	
27	DF	(Bosnia and Herzegovina) Vedad Radonja	(Greece) AEK Athens Β	Promotion	1 July 2024	30 June 2025	
29	DF	(England) Moses Odubajo	(Greece) Aris	€1,000,000	18 July 2024	30 June 2026	
37	MF	(Argentina) Roberto Pereyra	(Italy) Udinese	Free transfer	12 July 2024	30 June 2026	
55	DF	(Greece) Konstantinos Chrysopoulos	(Greece) AEK Athens Β	Promotion	1 July 2024	30 June 2028	
69	GK	(Greece) Dimitris Goumas	(Germany) SpVgg Greuther Fürth II	Free transfer	24 July 2024	30 June 2027	
91	GK	(Italy) Alberto Brignoli	(Greece) Panathinaikos	Free transfer	2 July 2024	30 June 2027	
—	DF	(Ukraine) Oleh Danchenko	(Ukraine) Zorya Luhansk	Loan return	1 July 2024	30 June 2024	

=== Out ===
==== Summer ====
No.	Pos.	Player	To	Fee	Date	Source
9	FW	(Netherlands) Tom van Weert	(Greece) Atromitos	End of contract	1 July 2024	
11	FW	(Argentina) Sergio Araujo	(Uruguay) Cerro Porteño	End of contract	13 September 2024	
14	FW	(Argentina) Ezequiel Ponce	(United States) Houston Dynamo	€9,000,000	17 June 2024	
18	DF	(Peru) Alexander Callens	(Spain) Girona	Loan return	30 June 2024	
29	DF	(France) Djibril Sidibé	(France) Toulouse	End of contract	2 August 2024	
30	GK	(Greece) Georgios Athanasiadis	(Cyprus) AEK Larnaca	Contract termination	23 August 2024	
53	FW	(Greece) Theodosis Macheras	(Greece) AEK Athens Β		1 July 2024	
70	MF	(Mexico) Rodolfo Pizarro	(Mexico) Mazatlán	Free transfer	16 September 2024	
—	DF	(Ukraine) Oleh Danchenko	Retired		1 July 2024	

==== Winter ====
No.	Pos.	Player	To	Fee	Date	Source
5	FW	(Morocco) Nordin Amrabat	(England) Hull City	Contract termination	17 January 2025	
7	FW	(Trinidad and Tobago) Levi García	(Russia) Spartak Moscow	€18,700,000	7 February 2025	
10	FW	(Switzerland) Steven Zuber	(Switzerland) Zürich	Contract termination	11 December 2024	
25	MF	(Greece) Konstantinos Galanopoulos	(Cyprus) APOEL	Contract termination	2 January 2025	

=== Loan out ===
==== Summer ====
No.	Pos.	Player	To	Fee	Date	Until	Option to buy	Source
27	DF	(Bosnia and Herzegovina) Vedad Radonja	(Greece) Lamia	Free	19 August 2024	30 June 2025	✗	
55	DF	(Greece) Konstantinos Chrysopoulos	(Cyprus) Anorthosis Famagusta	Free	15 August 2024	30 June 2025	✗	
90	FW	(Angola) Zini	(Greece) Levadiakos	Free	11 September 2024	30 June 2025	✗	

==== Winter ====
No.	Pos.	Player	To	Fee	Date	Until	Option to buy	Source
69	GK	(Greece) Dimitris Goumas	(Finland) PK-35	Free	23 March 2025	31 December 2025	✗	

Notes

a. Sint-Truidense keeps the 10% of the player's rights.

=== Contract renewals ===
No.	Pos.	Player	Date	Former Exp. Date	New Exp. Date	Source
2	DF	(Cameroon) Harold Moukoudi	1 August 2024	30 June 2026	30 June 2028	
5	FW	(Morocco) Nordin Amrabat	2 July 2024	30 June 2024	30 June 2025	
19	MF	(Sweden) Niclas Eliasson	24 July 2024	30 June 2027	30 June 2028	
27	DF	(Bosnia and Herzegovina) Vedad Radonja	12 August 2024	30 June 2025	30 June 2026	

=== Overall transfer activity ===
==== Expenditure ====
Summer: ▼€7,800,000

Winter: ▼€0

Total: ▼€7,800,000

==== Income ====
Summer: ▲€9,000,000

Winter: ▲€18,700,000

Total: ▲€27,700,000

==== Net Totals ====
Summer: ▲€1,200,000

Winter: ▲€18,700,000

Total: ▲€19,900,000

== Pre-season and friendlies ==
28 June 2024 Friendly	AZ	6–0	AEK Athens	Alkmaar
12:30 EEST (UTC+3)	Van Bommel 10'; Zeefuik 27'; Buurmeester 43'; Mijnans 63'; Van Brederode 88'; Kasius 89'	Report		Stadium: AFAS Trainingscomplex

3 July 2024 Friendly	AEK Athens	3–0	Beerschot	Burgh-Haamstede
14:00 EEST (UTC+3)	Galanopoulos 9'; Zini 15'; Golfinos 78'	Report		Stadium: Sportpark Van Zuijen
Note: 120-minute match (30-minute quarters).

6 July 2024 Friendly	Club Brugge	4–1	AEK Athens	Westkapelle
15:00 EEST (UTC+3)	Ljubičić 13' (o.g.); Jutglà 29'; Talbi 44'; Et-Taïbi (yellow card) 104'; Barberà 117'	Report	García 12'; Mantalos (yellow card) 52'	Stadium: Belfius Basecamp; Attendance: 20; Referee: Lawrence Visser (Belgium)
Note: 120-minute match (45+30+45 minutes).

10 July 2024 Friendly	AEK Athens	2–2	Gent	Burgh-Haamstede
16:00 EEST (UTC+3)	Zini 1'; Rota 53'; Galanopoulos (yellow card) 64'; Theodoridis (yellow card) 100'	Report	Hong 17'; Yokota 92'	Stadium: Sportpark Van Zuijen
Note: 130-minute match (35+35+30+30 minutes).

18 July 2024 Friendly	Omonia	1–1	AEK Athens	Nicosia
20:00 EEST (UTC+3)	Simić 79'; Kousoulos (yellow card) 82'	Report	Vida 69'; Koïta (yellow card) 83'	Stadium: GSP Stadium

20 March 2025 Friendly	AEK Athens	2–1	Levadiakos	Nea Filadelfeia
17:00 EET (UTC+2)	Goal		Goal	Stadium: Agia Sophia Stadium; Attendance: Behind closed doors

== Competitions ==
=== Overall record ===
Competition	First match	Last match	Starting round	Final position	Record							
Competition	First match	Last match	Starting round	Final position	Pld	W	D	L	GF	GA	GD	Win %
Super League	18 August 2024	9 March 2025	Matchday 1	2nd	26	16	5	5	44	16	+28	61.54
Super League Play-offs	30 March 2025	11 May 2025	Matchday 1	4th	6	0	0	6	4	12	−8	0.00
Greek Cup	30 October 2024	2 April 2025	Round of 16	Semi-finals	6	3	2	1	6	8	−2	50.00
UEFA Conference League	25 July 2024	15 August 2024	Second qualifying round	Third qualifying round	4	3	0	1	10	6	+4	75.00
Total					42	22	7	13	64	42	+22	52.38

Last updated: 11 May 2025
Source: Competitions

=== Super League Greece ===
==== Regular season ====
===== League table =====
Pos	Team	Pld	W	D	L	GF	GA	GD	Pts	Qualification or relegation
1	Olympiacos	26	18	6	2	45	16	+29	60	Qualification for the Championship play-offs
2	AEK Athens	26	16	5	5	44	16	+28	53	Qualification for the Championship play-offs
3	Panathinaikos	26	14	8	4	31	22	+9	50	Qualification for the Championship play-offs
4	PAOK	26	14	4	8	51	26	+25	46	Qualification for the Championship play-offs
5	Aris	26	12	6	8	31	28	+3	42	Qualification for the Europe play-offs

Source: Super League Greece
Rules for classification: 1) Points; 2) Head-to-head points; 3) Head-to-head goal difference; 4) Goal difference; 5) Goals scored; 6) Play-offs (neutral ground).
(Note: Criterion 6 is only used if needed to decide champion, teams for relegation or teams for UEFA competitions).

===== Results summary =====
Overall								Home						Away					
Pld	W	D	L	GF	GA	GD	Pts	W	D	L	GF	GA	GD	W	D	L	GF	GA	GD
26	16	5	5	44	16	+28	53	9	3	1	27	5	+22	7	2	4	17	11	+6

Last updated: 2025-3-9.
Source: Super League Greece

===== Results by Matchday =====
Round	1	2	3	4	5	6	7	8	9	10	11	12	13	14	15	16	17	18	19	20	21	22	23	24	25	26
Ground	H	H	A	H	A	H	A	H	A	A	H	A	H	A	A	H	A	H	A	H	A	H	H	A	H	A
Result	W	D	W	W	D	W	L	D	L	W	W	L	W	W	W	D	W	W	L	W	W	W	W	W	L	D
Position	1	3	3	1	2	1	3	3	3	3	2	4	2	2	2	4	3	2	3	2	2	2	2	2	2	2

Updated to match(es) played on 9 March 2025. Source: slgr.gr
A = Away; H = Home; W = Win; D = Draw; L = Loss; P = Postponed

===== Matches =====
18 August 2024 1	AEK Athens	3–0	OFI	Nea Filadelfeia
22:00 EEST (UTC+3)	García 11', (yellow card) 36'; Pilios 14'; Zuber 82'; Lamela (yellow card) 78'; Moukoudi (yellow card) 90+3'	Report	González (yellow card) 28'; Bakić (yellow card) 69'	Stadium: Agia Sophia Stadium; Attendance: Behind closed doors Referee: Spyros Zabalas (Epirus); Man of the Match: Stavros Pilios
Note: The match was played behind closed doors due to a 1 game punishment due to a firecracker thrown inside the stadium in last season's match against Lamia.

24 August 2024 2	AEK Athens	1–1	Lamia	Nea Filadelfeia
21:30 EEST (UTC+3)	Mantalos (yellow card) 78'; Moukoudi 87'	Report	Furtado 39', (yellow card) 90+3'; Kostić (yellow card) 49'; Bykov (yellow card) 78'; Tereziou (yellow card) 86'	Stadium: Agia Sophia Stadium; Attendance: 16,054; Referee: Konstantinos Poulikidis (Drama); Man of the Match: Ivan Kostić

1 September 2024 3	Levadiakos	0–3	AEK Athens	Levadia
19:00 EEST (UTC+3)	Pedrozo (yellow card) 35'; Romo (yellow card) 86'; Papadopoulos (yellow card) 87'	Report	Lamela (yellow card) 12'; Koïta 45'; Rota (yellow card) 57'; Eliasson 53'; Gaćinović 82', (yellow card) 83'	Stadium: Levadia Municipal Stadium; Attendance: 2,947; Referee: Fotis Polychronis (Pieria); Man of the Match: Aboubakary Koïta

16 September 2024 4	AEK Athens	2–0	Volos	Nea Filadelfeia
20:00 EEST (UTC+3)	Pierrot 21', (yellow card) 45+5'; Mitoglou (yellow card) 45+1'; Koïta 61'	Report	Altman (yellow card) 45+1'; Mygas (yellow card) 45+5'; Kalogeropoulos (yellow card) 88'	Stadium: Agia Sophia Stadium; Attendance: 22,540; Referee: Vasilis Fotias (Pella); Man of the Match: Frantzdy Pierrot

22 September 2024 5	Athens Kallithea	0–0	AEK Athens	Ampelokipoi
21:00 EEST (UTC+3)	Pasalidis (yellow card) 13'; Motoc (yellow card) 23'; Mercati (yellow card) 53'	Report	Koïta (yellow card) 45'; Mantalos (yellow card) 65'; Jønsson (yellow card) 78'; Pineda (yellow card) 90+1'; Pilios (yellow card) 90+6'	Stadium: Leoforos Alexandras Stadium; Attendance: 475; Referee: Athanasios Tzilos (Larissa); Man of the Match: Bernabé Barragán

29 September 2024 6	AEK Athens	2–0	Panathinaikos	Nea Filadelfeia
21:00 EEST (UTC+3)	Rota (yellow card) 9'; Szymański (yellow card) 19'; Pierrot 31'; Eliasson (yellow card) 38'; Mantalos (yellow card) 72'; Jønsson (yellow card) 88'; Amrabat 90+3' (pen.); Pilios (yellow card) 90+7'	Report	Baldock (yellow card) 21'; Arão (yellow card) 45+1'; Tetê (yellow card) 59'; Ingason (yellow card) 19'	Stadium: Agia Sophia Stadium; Attendance: 30,082; Referee: Sascha Stegemann (Germany); Man of the Match: Frantzdy Pierrot

5 October 2024 7	Panetolikos	1–0	AEK Athens	Agrinio
19:30 EEST (UTC+3)	Stajić (yellow card) 51'; Pérez (yellow card) 67'; Luís 73'; Sielis (yellow card) 90'; Bakakis (yellow card) 90+7'	Report	Pereyra (yellow card) 23'; Pierrot (yellow card) 45'; Pineda (yellow card) 70'; Amrabat (yellow card) 86'	Stadium: Panetolikos Stadium; Referee: Konstantinos Poulikidis (Drama); Man of the Match: Miguel Luís

20 October 2024 8	AEK Athens	1–1	PAOK	Nea Filadelfeia
20:30 EEST (UTC+3)	Pierrot 25'; Lamela (yellow card) 26'; Moukoudi (yellow card) 61'	Report	Baba 15'; Ozdoyev (yellow card) 54'	Stadium: Agia Sophia Stadium; Attendance: 30,950; Referee: Rade Obrenovič (Slovenia); Man of the Match: Frantzdy Pierrot

26 October 2024 9	Panserraikos	1–0	AEK Athens	Serres
20:00 EEST (UTC+3)	Betancor 23' (pen.), (yellow card) 29'; Terzić (red card) 27'; Tomás (yellow card) 84'	Report	Hajsafi (yellow card) 6'; Pereyra (yellow card) 22'; Vida (yellow card) 48'	Stadium: Serres Municipal Stadium; Attendance: 5,123; Referee: Panagiotis Tsiaras (Kavala); Man of the Match: Jefté Betancor

3 November 2024 10	Atromitos	0–1	AEK Athens	Peristeri
20:30 EET (UTC+2)	Quini (yellow card) 5'	Report	Odubajo (yellow card) 30'; García 45+1'; Moukoudi (yellow card) 64'; Jønsson (yellow card) 90'	Stadium: Peristeri Stadium; Attendance: 1,835; Referee: Christos Vergetis (Arcadia); Man of the Match: Petros Mantalos

9 November 2024 11	AEK Athens	3–0	Asteras Tripolis	Nea Filadelfeia
20:00 EET (UTC+2)	Hajsafi 9'; Fernandes 32'; García 59'	Report	Alho (yellow card) 17'; Deli (yellow card) 30'; Alagbe (red card) 36'; Triantafyllopoulos (yellow card) 53'; Tzandaris (red card) 70'	Stadium: Agia Sophia Stadium; Attendance: Behind closed doors Referee: Athanasios Tzilos (Larissa); Man of the Match: Paolo Fernandes
Note: The match was behind closed doors, due to punishment because a fan of AEK threw a firecracker after the end of the away match against Panserraikos.

24 November 2024 12	Olympiacos	4–1	AEK Athens	Piraeus
20:30 EET (UTC+2)	El Kaabi 7' (pen.), 49', 51'; Kostoulas (yellow card) 45'; Mouzakitis (yellow card) 45+5'; Martins 62'; Masouras (yellow card) 77'	Report	Mantalos (yellow card) 38'; Martial 43'; Lamela (red card) 81'	Stadium: Georgios Karaiskakis Stadium; Attendance: 32,353; Referee: Harm Osmers (Germany); Man of the Match: Ayoub El Kaabi

30 November 2024 13	AEK Athens	4–0	Aris	Nea Filadelfeia
20:30 EET (UTC+2)	Moukoudi 17'; García (yellow card) 19', (goal) 58'; Martial 45' (pen.); Koïta (yellow card) 80'; Pierrot 89'	Report	Vélez (yellow card) 15'; Frýdek (yellow card) 33'; Mallo (yellow card) 77'	Stadium: Agia Sophia Stadium; Attendance: 22,505; Referee: Fábio Veríssimo (Portugal); Man of the Match: Orbelín Pineda

8 December 2024 14	OFI	1–2	AEK Athens	Heraklion
17:00 EET (UTC+2)	Nuss (red card) 10'; Karachalios 36', (yellow card) 90+2'; Jung (yellow card) 57'; Neira (yellow card) 65'; Bakić (yellow card) 80'; Abanda (yellow card) 85'	Report	Moukoudi (yellow card) 45+2', (goal) 45+6'; Lamela (yellow card) 45+3'; Strakosha (yellow card) 56'; Szymański (yellow card) 57'; Martial 87'; Mantalos (yellow card) 90+4'	Stadium: Theodoros Vardinogiannis Stadium; Attendance: 4,414; Referee: Stavros Tsimenteridis (Kozani); Man of the Match: Levi García

14 December 2024 15	Lamia	0–1	AEK Athens	Lamia
17:00 EET (UTC+2)	Dentakis (yellow card) 20'; Vitlis (yellow card) 66'	Report	Pilios (yellow card) 44'; Fernandes (yellow card) 62'; Mitoglou 76'	Stadium: Lamia Municipal Stadium; Attendance: 4,249; Referee: Ioannis Papadopoulos (Macedonia); Man of the Match: Gerasimos Mitoglou

22 December 2024 16	AEK Athens	1–1	Levadiakos	Nea Filadelfeia
21:00 EET (UTC+2)	Rota (yellow card) 43'; Mitoglou 90+4'; Moukoudi (yellow card) 90+8'	Report	Balzi (yellow card) 8'; Pedrozo 57' (pen.), (yellow card) 70'; Moreira (yellow card) 71'; Garavelis (yellow card) 79'; Tsapras (yellow card) 83'; Erramuspe (yellow card) 86'; Plegas (yellow card) 90+2'; Romo (yellow card) 90+4'	Stadium: Agia Sophia Stadium; Attendance: 21,150; Referee: Alexandros Tsakalidis (Chalkidiki); Man of the Match: Gerasimos Mitoglou

5 January 2025 17	Volos	2–4	AEK Athens	Volos
17:00 EET (UTC+2)	Ferrari (yellow card) 58'; Koszta 70'; Conde 90+4'	Report	Jønsson 18', (yellow card) 63'; Fernandes (yellow card) 45+1'; García 52'; Martial 54'; Pierrot 86'	Stadium: Panthessaliko Stadium; Attendance: 9,597; Referee: Konstantinos Katikos (Athens); Man of the Match: Paolo Fernandes

12 January 2025 18	AEK Athens	2–0	Athens Kallithea	Nea Filadelfeia
20:30 EET (UTC+2)	Gaćinović (yellow card) 5' (yellow-red card) 86'; Mitoglou 18'; Lamela 90+2'	Report	Mercati (yellow card) 20'; Pasalidis (yellow card) 68'; Ndiaye (yellow card) 90'	Stadium: Agia Sophia Stadium; Attendance: 21,180; Referee: Alexandros Katsikogiannis (Epirus); Man of the Match: Gerasimos Mitoglou

19 January 2025 19	Panathinaikos	1–0	AEK Athens	Marousi
20:30 EET (UTC+2)	Đuričić (yellow card) 6'; Palmer-Brown (yellow card) 13'; Ioannidis 38' (pen.); Mladenović (yellow card) 90+6'; Tetê (yellow card) 90+6'	Report	Jønsson (yellow card) 35'; Szymański (yellow card) 76'	Stadium: Olympic Stadium; Attendance: 22,937; Referee: Espen Eskås (Norway); Man of the Match: Erik Palmer-Brown

25 January 2025 20	AEK Athens	1–0	Panetolikos	Nea Filadelfeia
20:00 EET (UTC+2)	Martial 56'; Odubajo (yellow card) 72'	Report	Mavrias (yellow card) 28'; Bouzoukis (yellow card) 49'; Lomonaco (yellow card) 79'	Stadium: Agia Sophia Stadium; Attendance: 21,433; Referee: Fotis Polychronis (Pieria); Man of the Match: Orbelín Pineda

2 February 2025 21	PAOK	1–2	AEK Athens	Thessaloniki
19:30 EET (UTC+2)	Otto (yellow card) 35'; Camara (yellow card) 45+2'; Baba 52'; Pelkas (yellow card) 90+6'	Report	Lamela (yellow card) 22', (goal) 37', 48'; Pierrot (yellow card) 24'; Rota (yellow card) 45+3'; Odubajo (yellow card) 61'; Moukoudi (yellow card) 81'; Pereyra (yellow card) 82'; Koïta (yellow card) 90'; Brignoli (yellow card) 90+4'	Stadium: Toumba Stadium; Attendance: 22,150; Referee: Felix Zwayer (Germany); Man of the Match: Erik Lamela

9 February 2025 22	AEK Athens	5–0	Panserraikos	Nea Filadelfeia
20:30 EET (UTC+2)	Pineda 8'; Martial 23', 81', (yellow card) 75'; Pereyra (yellow card) 50'; Ljubičić 74', 84'	Report	Chatzistravos (yellow card) 75'; Sofianos (yellow card) 79'; Betancor (yellow card) 83'	Stadium: Agia Sophia Stadium; Attendance: Behind closed doors Referee: Angelos Evangelou (Athens); Man of the Match: Niclas Eliasson

15 February 2025 23	AEK Athens	2–1	Atromitos	Nea Filadelfeia
20:00 EET (UTC+2)	Eliasson 32'; Pineda (yellow card) 50'; Jønsson (yellow card) 71'; Lamela (yellow card) 78'; Mantalos 90+4'	Report	Tzovaras 11'; Karamanis (yellow card) 22'; Jubitana (yellow card) 29'; Choutesiotis (yellow card) 80'	Stadium: Agia Sophia Stadium; Attendance: Behind closed doors Referee: Konstantinos Tsetsilas (Kastoria); Man of the Match: Niclas Eliasson

23 February 2025 24	Asteras Tripolis	0–3	AEK Athens	Tripoli
19:30 EET (UTC+2)	Bartolo (yellow card) 48'; Deli (red card) 67'	Report	Gaćinović (yellow card) 15', (goal) 64'; Eliasson 76'; Pierrot 80'	Stadium: Theodoros Kolokotronis Stadium; Attendance: 952; Referee: Anastasios Papapetrou (Athens); Man of the Match: Damian Szymański

2 March 2025 25	AEK Athens	0–1	Olympiacos	Nea Filadelfeia
20:30 EET (UTC+2)	Mantalos (yellow card) 33'; Koïta (yellow card) 73'	Report	Costinha (yellow card) 33'; D. García (yellow card) 45'; Hezze (yellow card) 58'; Rodinei (yellow card) 89'; Chiquinho 90'	Stadium: Agia Sophia Stadium; Attendance: 30,663; Referee: Sven Jablonski (Germany); Man of the Match: Alberto Brignoli

9 March 2025 26	Aris	0–0	AEK Athens	Thessaloniki
19:00 EET (UTC+2)	Mallo (yellow card) 49'; Monchu (yellow card) 68'	Report	Lamela (yellow card) 45+2'; Mitoglou (red card) 58'; Szymański (yellow card) 62'; Ljubičić (yellow card) 84'	Stadium: Kleanthis Vikelidis Stadium; Attendance: 5,281; Referee: Daniel Siebert (Germany); Man of the Match: José Cifuentes

==== Championship play-offs ====
===== Table =====
Pos	Team	Pld	W	D	L	GF	GA	GD	Pts	Qualification
1	Olympiacos (C)	32	23	6	3	58	22	+36	75	Qualification for the Champions League league phase (Note: Olympiacos originally qualified for the 2025–26 UEFA Champions League second qualifying round, but since the 2024–25 UEFA Champions League winner (Paris Saint-Germain) already qualified via their domestic league, Olympiacos was promoted to the Champions League league phase as the league champion with the highest club coefficient in the Champions League Champions Path qualifying rounds.)
2	Panathinaikos	32	17	8	7	42	32	+10	59	Qualification for the Champions League second qualifying round
3	PAOK	32	18	4	10	62	37	+25	58	Qualification for the Europa League third qualifying round (Note: Since the 2024–25 Greek Cup winner (Olympiacos) qualified for the Champions League, the Europa League third qualifying round place was passed to the third-placed team.)
4	AEK Athens	32	16	5	11	48	28	+20	53	Qualification for the Conference League second qualifying round

Source: Super League Greece
Rules for classification: 1) Points; 2) Head-to-head points (Regular season and play-off); 3) Head-to-head goal difference (Regular season and play-off); 4) Regular season position.
(C) Champions

===== Results summary =====
Overall								Home						Away					
Pld	W	D	L	GF	GA	GD	Pts	W	D	L	GF	GA	GD	W	D	L	GF	GA	GD
6	0	0	6	4	12	−8	0	0	0	3	3	7	−4	0	0	3	1	5	−4

Last updated: 2025-4-6.
Source: Super League Greece

===== Results by Matchday =====
Round	1	2	3	4	5	6
Ground	H	A	A	H	H	A
Result	L	L	L	L	L	L
Position	2	3	3	4	4	4

Updated to match(es) played on 11 May 2025. Source: Super League Greece
A = Away; H = Home; W = Win; D = Draw; L = Loss; P = Postponed

===== Matches =====
30 March 2025 1	AEK Athens	2–3	PAOK	Nea Filadelfeia
19:00 EEST (UTC+3)	Mantalos 22' (pen.); Lamela 47'	Report	Michailidis (yellow card) 9'; Kotarski (yellow card) 20'; Kędziora (yellow card) 25'; Konstantelias 58'; Živković 66'; Baba (yellow card) 81'; Pelkas 85'; Ozdoyev (yellow card) 88'	Stadium: Agia Sophia Stadium; Attendance: 25,433; Referee: Felix Brych (Germany); Man of the Match: Giannis Michailidis

6 April 2025 2	Panathinaikos	3–1	AEK Athens	Marousi
21:30 EEST (UTC+3)	Maksimović 17'; Đuričić 80'; Jeremejeff 88'; Mladenović (yellow card) 90+4'	Report	Pierrot (yellow card) 22'; Moukoudi 47'; Gaćinović (yellow card) 78'	Stadium: Olympic Stadium; Attendance: 10,272; Referee: Damian Sylwestrzak (Poland); Man of the Match: Filip Đuričić

13 April 2025 3	Olympiacos	1–0	AEK Athens	Piraeus
21:00 EEST (UTC+3)	El Kaabi 55'; D. García (yellow card) 62'; Yaremchuk (yellow card) 90+2'; Carmo (red card) 90+6'; Paschalakis (red card) 90+6'	Report	Koïta (yellow card) 24'; Pilios (yellow card) 69'; Mitoglou (yellow card) 76'; Odubajo (yellow card) 84'; Moukoudi (red card) 90+6'; Martial (red card) 90+6'	Stadium: Georgios Karaiskakis Stadium; Attendance: 32,600; Referee: Andrea Colombo (Italy); Man of the Match: Ayoub El Kaabi
Note: After the end of the match incidents occurred between the players and as a result Paschalakis, Carmo, Moukoudi, Martial and the manager, Almeyda were shown the red card. The footballers were all punished with a 3-match ban as well.

27 April 2025 4	AEK Athens	0–2	Olympiacos	Nea Filadelfeia
20:00 EEST (UTC+3)	Gaćinović (yellow card) 41'; Mantalos (yellow card) 57'; Pineda (yellow card) 71'; Odubajo (yellow card) 80'	Report	Velde 43'; Pirola (yellow card) 59'; Yaremchuk 74'; Stamenić (yellow card) 87'	Stadium: Agia Sophia Stadium; Attendance: 22,152; Referee: Halil Umut Meler (Turkey); Man of the Match: Konstantinos Tzolakis

4 May 2025 5	AEK Athens	1–2	Panathinaikos	Nea Filadelfeia
20:00 EEST (UTC+3)	Pineda (yellow card) 42'; Lamela 44', (yellow card) 72'; Mantalos (yellow card) 49'; Rota (yellow card) 54'; Szymański (yellow card) 79'	Report	Ounahi 51'; Świderski (yellow card) 54', (goal) 61' (pen.); Palmer-Brown (yellow card) 67'; Pellistri (yellow card) 79'	Stadium: Agia Sophia Stadium; Attendance: 22,172; Referee: Enea Jorgji (Albania); Man of the Match: Georgios Vagiannidis

11 May 2025 6	PAOK	1–0	AEK Athens	Thessaloniki
20:00 EEST (UTC+3)	Michailidis 45'; Živković (yellow card) 69'; Konstantelias (yellow card) 84'; Kotarski (yellow card) 90+6'	Report	Lamela (yellow card) 34'; Vida (yellow card) 44'; Rota (yellow card) 45+2'; Hajsafi (yellow card) 76'	Stadium: Toumba Stadium; Attendance: 22,711; Referee: Seren Storks (Germany); Man of the Match: Giannis Michailidis

=== Greek Cup ===
AEK Athens entered the Greek Cup at the round of 16.

==== Round of 16 ====
30 October 2024 First leg	AEK Athens	1–0	Aris	Nea Filadelfeia
19:30 EET (UTC+2)	Brignoli (yellow card) 33'; Martial 45+1'; Ljubičić (yellow card) 65'; Gaćinović (yellow card) 81'; Lamela (yellow card) 90+4'	Report	Monchu (yellow card) 57'	Stadium: Agia Sophia Stadium; Attendance: 21,582; Referee: Anastasios Sidiropoulos (Dodecanese); Man of the Match: Anthony Martial

3 December 2024 Second leg	Aris	1–1 (1–2 agg.)	AEK Athens	Thessaloniki
19:30 EET (UTC+2)	Morón 45+2'; Montoya (yellow card) 60'; Brabec (yellow card) 74'	Report	Hajsafi (yellow card) 23'; Gaćinović (yellow card) 31'; Odubajo (yellow card) 45+4'; Pereyra (yellow card) 57'; Brignoli (yellow card) 66'; Martial 81'; Eliasson (yellow card) 84'; Szymański (yellow card) 88'	Stadium: Kleanthis Vikelidis Stadium; Referee: Vasilis Fotias (Pella); Man of the Match: Anthony Martial

==== Quarter-finals ====
18 December 2024 First leg	AEK Athens	1–0	PAOK	Nea Filadelfeia
21:00 EET (UTC+2)	Martial (penalty missed) 22'; Lamela 53'	Report	Kotarski (yellow card) 21'; Lovren (yellow card) 79' (red card) 90+2'; Ozdoyev (yellow card) 82'	Stadium: Agia Sophia Stadium; Attendance: 27,612; Referee: Simone Sozza (Italy); Man of the Match: Erik Lamela

9 January 2025 Second leg	PAOK	1–1 (a.e.t.) (1–2 agg.)	AEK Athens	Thessaloniki
19:30 EET (UTC+2)	Kędziora (yellow card) 25'; Živković 90+1', (yellow card) 90+2'; Sastre (yellow card) 94'; Shoretire (yellow card) 99'	Report	Martial (yellow card) 10'; Moukoudi (yellow card) 25'; Odubajo 107'; Brignoli (yellow card) 117'	Stadium: Toumba Stadium; Attendance: 22,837; Referee: Igor Pajač (Croatia); Man of the Match: Alberto Brignoli

==== Semi-finals ====
26 February 2025 First leg	Olympiacos	6–0	AEK Athens	Piraeus
20:00 EET (UTC+2)	Horta 9', 19' (o.g.); Onyemaechi (yellow card) 15'; Yaremchuk 22', 54'; Palma 47'; El Kaabi 78'; Hezze (yellow card) 82'	Report	Pineda (yellow card) 43'; Lamela (yellow card) 63'	Stadium: Karaiskakis Stadium; Referee: Felix Brych (Germany); Man of the Match: André Horta

2 April 2025 Second leg	AEK Athens	2–0 (2–6 agg.)	Olympiacos	Nea Filadelfeia
20:30 EEST (UTC+3)	Frantzdy Pierrot (yellow card) 31'; Carmo 37' (o.g.); Pineda (yellow card) 67'; Odubajo (yellow card) 73'; Mantalos 77'	Report	Palma (yellow card) 41'; Paschalakis (yellow card) 45+2'; Biancone (yellow card) 66'; García (yellow card) 73'	Stadium: Agia Sophia Stadium; Attendance: 14,502; Referee: Rohit Saggi (Norway); Man of the Match: Petros Mantalos

=== UEFA Conference League ===
==== Second qualifying round ====
The draw for the second qualifying round was held on 19 June 2024

24 July 2024 First leg	AEK Athens (Greece)	4–3	(Andorra) Inter Club d'Escaldes	Athens, Greece
21:00 EEST (UTC+3)	Ljubičić 6'; García 20', (penalty missed) 75'; Gaćinović 31'; Moukoudi 52'; Strakosha (yellow card) 76'; Jønsson (yellow card) 82'; Mantalos (yellow card) 86'	Report	Alonso (yellow card) 42'; Vida 65' (o.g.); Muñoz (yellow card) 73'; Andreu 78' (pen.); Martínez 83'	Stadium: Agia Sophia Stadium; Attendance: 19,766; Referee: Lothar D'hondt (Belgium)

1 August 2024 Second leg	Inter Club d'Escaldes (Andorra)	0–4 (3–8 agg.)	(Greece) AEK Athens	Andorra la Vella, Andorra
19:30 EEST (UTC+3)	Lopez (yellow card) 40'	Report	Hajsafi (yellow card) 23'; García 29', 74', 86'; Jønsson (yellow card) 50'; Fernandes (yellow card) 81'; Amrabat 83'	Stadium: Estadi Nacional; Attendance: 870; Referee: Luca Cibelli (Switzerland)

==== Third qualifying round ====
6 August 2024 First leg	Noah (Armenia)	3–1	(Greece) AEK Athens	Armavir, Armenia
19:00 EEST (UTC+3)	Pinson 33'; Gamboš (yellow card) 36'; Santos (yellow card) 54'; Sangaré (yellow card) 59'; Čančarević 67'; Gregório (yellow card) 69', (goal) 90+8'	Report	García 22'; Ljubičić (yellow card) 58'; Koïta (yellow card) 79'; Rota (yellow card) 83'	Stadium: Armavir City Stadium; Attendance: 2,800; Referee: Visar Kastrati (Kosovo)

15 August 2024 Second leg	AEK Athens (Greece)	1–0 (2–3 agg.)	(Armenia) Noah	Athens, Greece
20:30 EEST (UTC+3)	Ljubičić (yellow card) 15'; Pilios (yellow card) 24'; Szymański (yellow card) 45'; Callens (yellow card) 53'; Vida (yellow card) 60'; Silva 90+2' (o.g.); Rota (yellow card) 90+13'	Report	Ferreira (yellow card) 10'; Þórarinsson (yellow card) 68'; Avanesyan (yellow card) 71'; Çinari (yellow card) 78'; Čančarević (yellow card) 90+7'	Stadium: Agia Sophia Stadium; Attendance: 11,468; Referee: Robert Schröder (Germany)

== Statistics ==
=== Squad statistics ===
As of 11 May 2025

No.	Pos	Player	Super League		Super League Play-offs		Greek Cup		Conference League		Total	
No.	Pos	Player	Apps	Goals	Apps	Goals	Apps	Goals	Apps	Goals	Apps	Goals
Goalkeepers
1	GK	(Albania) Thomas Strakosha	23	0	0	0	2	0	4	0	29	0
91	GK	(Italy) Alberto Brignoli	3	0	6	0	4	0	0	0	13	0
—	GK	(Austria) Cican Stanković	0	0	0	0	0	0	0	0	0	0
Defenders
2	DF	(Cameroon) Harold Moukoudi	18	3	3	1	5	0	3	1	29	5
3	DF	(Greece) Stavros Pilios	14	1	3	0	2	0	1	0	20	1
12	DF	(Greece) Lazaros Rota	20	0	4	0	5	0	4	0	33	0
18	DF	(Peru) Alexander Callens	7	0	0	0	1	0	3	0	11	0
21	DF	(Croatia) Domagoj Vida	21	0	5	0	1	0	4	0	31	0
24	DF	(Greece) Gerasimos Mitoglou	11	3	4	0	5	0	0	0	20	3
28	DF	(Iran) Ehsan Hajsafi	14	1	1	0	4	0	4	0	23	1
29	DF	(England) Moses Odubajo	11	0	5	0	3	1	0	0	19	1
Midfielders
4	MF	(Poland) Damian Szymański	21	0	5	0	4	0	4	0	34	0
6	MF	(Denmark) Jens Jønsson	14	1	5	0	4	0	2	0	25	1
8	MF	(Serbia) Mijat Gaćinović	15	2	5	0	5	0	4	1	29	3
13	MF	(Mexico) Orbelín Pineda	24	1	6	0	6	0	2	0	38	1
19	MF	(Sweden) Niclas Eliasson	15	3	6	0	4	0	3	0	28	3
20	MF	(Greece) Petros Mantalos	19	1	6	1	4	1	3	0	32	3
22	MF	(Spain) Paolo Fernandes	15	1	4	0	5	0	3	0	27	1
23	MF	(Croatia) Robert Ljubičić	21	2	1	0	3	0	4	1	29	3
37	MF	(Argentina) Roberto Pereyra	21	0	4	0	4	0	1	0	30	0
Forwards
9	FW	(Argentina) Erik Lamela	18	3	6	2	5	1	2	0	31	6
11	FW	(Mauritania) Aboubakary Koïta	17	2	6	0	3	0	4	0	30	2
14	FW	(Haiti) Frantzdy Pierrot	22	6	6	0	6	0	0	0	34	6
16	FW	(Greece) Sotiris Tsiloulis	5	0	1	0	1	0	0	0	7	0
26	FW	(France) Anthony Martial	16	7	3	0	4	2	0	0	23	9
Left during Winter Transfer Window
69	GK	(Greece) Dimitris Goumas	0	0	0	0	0	0	0	0	0	0
25	MF	(Greece) Konstantinos Galanopoulos	0	0	0	0	1	0	1	0	2	0
5	FW	(Morocco) Nordin Amrabat	6	1	0	0	0	0	3	1	9	2
7	FW	(Trinidad and Tobago) Levi García	16	5	0	0	3	0	3	5	22	10
10	FW	(Switzerland) Steven Zuber	3	1	0	0	1	0	1	0	5	1
From AEK Athens B
81	GK	(Greece) Angelos Angelopoulos	0	0	0	0	0	0	0	0	0	0
99	GK	(Greece) Georgios Theocharis	0	0	0	0	0	0	0	0	0	0
34	DF	(Greece) Christos Kosidis	0	0	0	0	0	0	0	0	0	0
75	DF	(Greece) Christos Giannoulis	0	0	0	0	0	0	0	0	0	0
33	MF	(Greece) Loukas Maroutsis	0	0	0	0	0	0	0	0	0	0
73	MF	(Greece) Christoforos Kolimatsis	0	0	0	0	0	0	0	0	0	0
80	MF	(Ivory Coast) Hamed Kader Fofana	0	0	0	0	0	0	0	0	0	0
97	MF	(Trinidad and Tobago) Judah García	0	0	0	0	0	0	0	0	0	0
32	FW	(Argentina) Elián Sosa	0	0	0	0	0	0	0	0	0	0
44	FW	(Cameroon) Donaldoni Zambou Nguemechieu	0	0	0	0	0	0	0	0	0	0
82	FW	(Greece) Spyros Skondras	0	0	0	0	0	0	0	0	0	0
98	FW	(Greece) Dimitrios Theodoridis	2	0	0	0	1	0	0	0	3	0

=== Goalscorers ===
As of 11 May 2025
The list is sorted by competition order when total goals are equal, then by position and then by squad number.

Rank	No.	Pos.	Player	Super League	Super League Play-offs	Greek Cup	Conference League	Total
1	7	FW	(Trinidad and Tobago) Levi García	5	0	0	5	10
2	26	FW	(France) Anthony Martial	7	0	2	0	9
3	14	FW	(Haiti) Frantzdy Pierrot	6	0	0	0	6
3	9	FW	(Argentina) Erik Lamela	3	2	1	0	6
5	2	DF	(Cameroon) Harold Moukoudi	3	1	0	1	5
6	24	DF	(Greece) Gerasimos Mitoglou	3	0	0	0	3
6	19	MF	(Sweden) Niclas Eliasson	3	0	0	0	3
6	23	MF	(Croatia) Robert Ljubičić	2	0	0	1	3
6	8	MF	(Serbia) Mijat Gaćinović	2	0	0	1	3
6	20	MF	(Greece) Petros Mantalos	1	1	1	0	3
11	11	FW	(Mauritania) Aboubakary Koïta	2	0	0	0	2
11	5	FW	(Morocco) Nordin Amrabat	1	0	0	1	2
13	3	DF	(Greece) Stavros Pilios	1	0	0	0	1
13	28	DF	(Iran) Ehsan Hajsafi	1	0	0	0	1
13	6	MF	(Denmark) Jens Jønsson	1	0	0	0	1
13	22	MF	(Spain) Paolo Fernandes	1	0	0	0	1
13	13	MF	(Mexico) Orbelín Pineda	1	0	0	0	1
13	10	FW	(Switzerland) Steven Zuber	1	0	0	0	1
13	29	DF	(England) Moses Odubajo	0	0	1	0	1
Own goals				0	0	1	1	2
Totals				44	4	6	10	64

=== Hat-tricks ===
Numbers in superscript represent the goals that the player scored.

Player	Against	Result	Date	Competition	Source
(Trinidad and Tobago) Levi García	(Andorra) Inter Club d'Escaldes	4–0 (A)	1 August 2024	Conference League	

=== Assists ===
As of 11 May 2025
The list is sorted by competition order when total assists are equal, then by position and then by squad number.

Rank	No.	Pos.	Player	Super League	Super League Play-offs	Greek Cup	Conference League	Total
1	12	DF	(Greece) Lazaros Rota	4	0	0	0	4
1	11	FW	(Mauritania) Aboubakary Koïta	3	1	0	0	4
1	20	MF	(Greece) Petros Mantalos	3	0	0	1	4
4	4	MF	(Poland) Damian Szymański	3	0	0	0	3
4	23	MF	(Croatia) Robert Ljubičić	3	0	0	0	3
4	9	FW	(Argentina) Erik Lamela	3	0	0	0	3
4	19	MF	(Sweden) Niclas Eliasson	2	0	0	1	3
8	13	MF	(Mexico) Orbelín Pineda	2	0	0	0	2
8	26	FW	(France) Anthony Martial	1	0	1	0	2
8	28	DF	(Iran) Ehsan Hajsafi	1	0	0	1	2
8	7	FW	(Trinidad and Tobago) Levi García	1	0	0	1	2
12	21	DF	(Croatia) Domagoj Vida	1	0	0	0	1
12	3	DF	(Greece) Stavros Pilios	1	0	0	0	1
12	22	MF	(Spain) Paolo Fernandes	1	0	0	0	1
12	5	FW	(Morocco) Nordin Amrabat	1	0	0	0	1
12	8	MF	(Serbia) Mijat Gaćinović	0	0	0	1	1
Totals				30	1	1	5	37

=== Clean sheets ===
As of 11 May 2025
The list is sorted by competition order when total clean sheets are equal and then by squad number. Clean sheets in games where both goalkeepers participated are awarded to the goalkeeper who started the game. Goalkeepers with no appearances are not included.

Rank	No.	Player	Super League	Super League Play-offs	Greek Cup	Conference League	Total
1	1	(Albania) Thomas Strakosha	12	0	1	2	15
2	91	(Italy) Alberto Brignoli	2	0	2	0	4
Totals			14	0	3	2	19

=== Disciplinary record ===
As of 11 May 2025

N	P	Nat.	Name	Super League			Super League Play-offs			Greek Cup			Conference League			Total			Notes
N	P	Nat.	Name	Yellow card	Second yellow card	Red card	Yellow card	Second yellow card	Red card	Yellow card	Second yellow card	Red card	Yellow card	Second yellow card	Red card	Yellow card	Second yellow card	Red card	Notes
Goalkeepers
1	GK	(Albania)	Thomas Strakosha	1									1			2			
91	GK	(Italy)	Alberto Brignoli	1						3						4			
—	GK	(Austria)	Cican Stanković																
Defenders
2	DF	(Cameroon)	Harold Moukoudi	6					1	1						7		1	
3	DF	(Greece)	Stavros Pilios	3			1						1			5			
12	DF	(Greece)	Lazaros Rota	4			2						2			8			
18	DF	(Peru)	Alexander Callens										1			1			
21	DF	(Croatia)	Domagoj Vida	1			1						1			3			
24	DF	(Greece)	Gerasimos Mitoglou	1		1	1									2		1	
28	DF	(Iran)	Ehsan Hajsafi	1			1			1			1			4			
29	DF	(England)	Moses Odubajo	3			2			2						7			
Midfielders
4	MF	(Poland)	Damian Szymański	4			1			1			1			7			
6	MF	(Denmark)	Jens Jønsson	6									2			8			
8	MF	(Serbia)	Mijat Gaćinović	3	1		2			2						7	1		
13	MF	(Mexico)	Orbelín Pineda	3			2			2						7			
19	MF	(Sweden)	Niclas Eliasson	1						1						2			
20	MF	(Greece)	Petros Mantalos	6			2						1			9			
22	MF	(Spain)	Paolo Fernandes	2									1			3			
23	MF	(Croatia)	Robert Ljubičić	1						1			2			4			
37	MF	(Argentina)	Roberto Pereyra	4						1						5			
Forwards
9	FW	(Argentina)	Erik Lamela	7		1	2			2						11		1	
11	FW	(Mauritania)	Aboubakary Koïta	4			1						1			6			
14	FW	(Haiti)	Frantzdy Pierrot	3			1			1						5			
16	FW	(Greece)	Sotiris Tsiloulis																
26	FW	(France)	Anthony Martial	1					1	1						2		1	
Left during Winter Transfer Window
69	GK	(Greece)	Dimitris Goumas																
25	MF	(Greece)	Konstantinos Galanopoulos																
5	FW	(Morocco)	Nordin Amrabat	1												1			
7	FW	(Trinidad and Tobago)	Levi García	2												2			
10	FW	(Switzerland)	Steven Zuber																
From AEK Athens B
81	GK	(Greece)	Angelos Angelopoulos																
99	GK	(Greece)	Georgios Theocharis																
34	DF	(Greece)	Christos Kosidis																
75	DF	(Greece)	Christos Giannoulis																
33	MF	(Greece)	Loukas Maroutsis																
73	MF	(Greece)	Christoforos Kolimatsis																
80	MF	(Ivory Coast)	Hamed Kader Fofana																
97	MF	(Trinidad and Tobago)	Judah García																
32	FW	(Argentina)	Elián Sosa																
44	FW	(Cameroon)	Donaldoni Zambou Nguemechieu																
82	FW	(Greece)	Spyros Skondras																
98	FW	(Greece)	Dimitrios Theodoridis																

=== Starting 11 ===
This section presents the most frequently used formation along with the players with the most starts across all competitions.

N.	Formation	Matchday(s)
17	4–3–3	13–24
13	4–2–3–1	5–8, 10–12, 26
9	4–1–3–2	1–4, 9
1	3–4–3	25

No.	Nat.	Player	Pos.
1	(Albania)	Thomas Strakosha	GK
21	(Croatia)	Domagoj Vida (C)	RCB
2	(Cameroon)	Harold Moukoudi	LCB
12	(Greece)	Lazaros Rota	RB
13	(Mexico)	Orbelín Pineda	LB
4	(Poland)	Damian Szymański	DM
23	(Croatia)	Robert Ljubicic	RCM
6	(Denmark)	Jens Jønsson	LCM
9	(Argentina)	Erik Lamela	RW
26	(France)	Anthony Martial	LW
14	(Haiti)	Frantzdy Pierrot	CF

Last updated: 2025-05-11

== Awards ==
Player	Pos.	Award	Source
(Greece) Stavros Pilios	DF	Stoiximan Best Goal (1st Matchday)	
(Sweden) Niclas Eliasson	MF	Stoiximan Best Goal (3rd Matchday)	
(Greece) Stavros Pilios	DF	Stoiximan Player of the Month (August)	
(Trinidad and Tobago) Levi García	FW	Stoiximan Best Goal (13rd Matchday)	
(France) Anthony Martial	FW	Stoiximan Player of the Month (November)	
(Argentina) Erik Lamela	FW	Stoiximan Best Goal (21st Matchday)	
(Argentina) Erik Lamela	FW	Stoiximan Goal of the Season	
(Greece) Petros Mantalos	MF	Stoiximan Player of the Club	
