= Anthony Martial =

French footballer (born 1995)

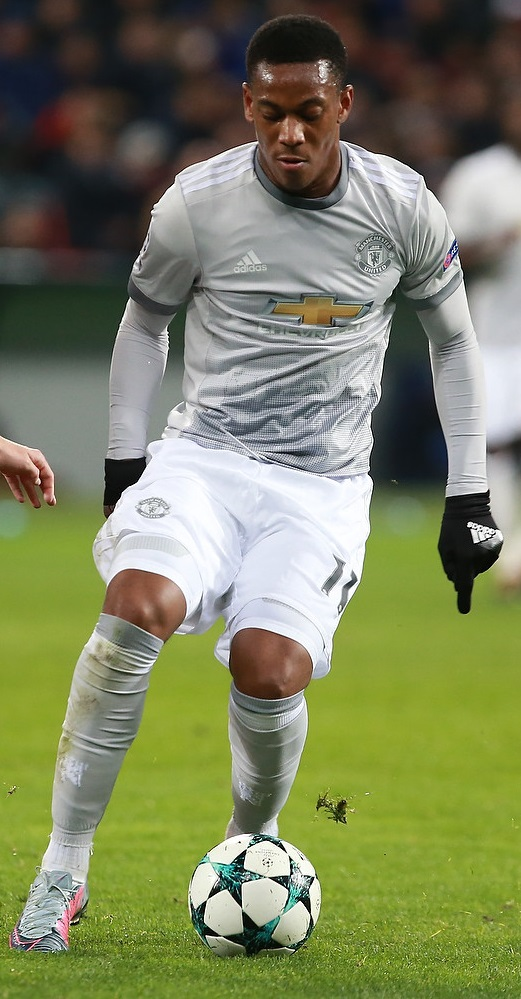
- Martial playing for Manchester United in 2017

Personal information
- Full name: Anthony Jordan Martial
- Date of birth: 5 December 1995 (age 30)
- Place of birth: Massy, France
- Height: 1.81 m (5 ft 11 in)
- Position: Forward

Youth career
- 2001–2009: CO Les Ulis
- 2009–2012: Lyon

Senior career*
Years	Team	Apps	(Gls)
2012–2013	Lyon B	11	(5)
2013	Lyon	3	(0)
2013	Monaco B	4	(3)
2013–2015	Monaco	49	(11)
2015–2024	Manchester United	209	(63)
2022	→ Sevilla (loan)	9	(0)
2024–2025	AEK Athens	16	(7)
2025–2026	Monterrey	17	(1)

International career
2010–2011	France U16	17	(9)
2011–2012	France U17	13	(9)
2012–2013	France U18	4	(3)
2013	France U19	5	(0)
2013–2015	France U21	12	(4)
2015–2021	France	30	(2)
Medal record
Representing France
Men's football
UEFA Nations League
Winner	2021 Italy
UEFA European Championship
Runner-up	2016 France
- * Club domestic league appearances and goals as of 03:58, 15 February 2026 (UTC)

Anthony Jordan Martial (French pronunciation: [maʁsjal]; born 5 December 1995) is a French professional footballer who plays as a forward.

After playing youth football for Les Ulis, Martial began his professional career at Lyon, before transferring to Monaco in 2013 for a fee of €6 million. He was a member of Monaco's squad for two seasons before signing for Premier League side Manchester United in 2015 for an initial fee of £36 million and £21.6 million in potential bonus payments; making it the highest fee paid for a teenager in football history at the time. He was the recipient of the 2015 Golden Boy Award for the best under-21 player in Europe.

In his debut season with Manchester United, Martial won the 2015–16 FA Cup and established himself as one of the most exciting prospects in the world. His trajectory stalled the following season, but he won more trophies under the guidance of Jose Mourinho. Martial had his best ever goalscoring season in 2019–20, netting 23 times in all competitions, and he was awarded Manchester United Players' Player of the Year. However, his form declined in seasons after that and in January 2022, Martial was loaned out to Spanish club Sevilla until the end of the 2021–22 season. He left the club in 2024 after his departure from United and subsequently signed for AEK Athens.

A youth international for France from under-16 to under-21 level, Martial made his senior international debut in 2015. He was named in their squad for UEFA Euro 2016, appearing in the final as France were defeated by Portugal.

== Club career ==
=== Early career and Lyon ===
Born in Massy, Essonne, Martial spent his youth years with Paris-based Les Ulis from 2001, the same team who produced French internationals Thierry Henry and Patrice Evra. Evra closely monitored the progress of Martial, and allowed him to play in one of his pairs of football boots at the age of 12. At the same age, Martial trialled at Manchester City.

At just 14 years old, in 2009, he was spotted by scouts from the Lyon academy and joined it the same year. During his second season in the Under-17 team, he distinguished himself by scoring 32 goals in 21 games, which resulted in a call-up to the France national under-17 football team for the 2012 UEFA European Under-17 Championship in Slovenia.

He made his professional debut for Lyon on 6 December 2012, in a Europa League group stage match against Hapoel Ironi Kiryat Shmona, replacing goalscorer Yassine Benzia for the final 10 minutes of a 2–0 victory at the Stade de Gerland. His first Ligue 1 game was on 3 February 2013 against Ajaccio, when he came on as a substitute in the 79th minute for Rachid Ghezzal in a 3–1 away loss. He made two further appearances from the bench that season.

=== Monaco ===
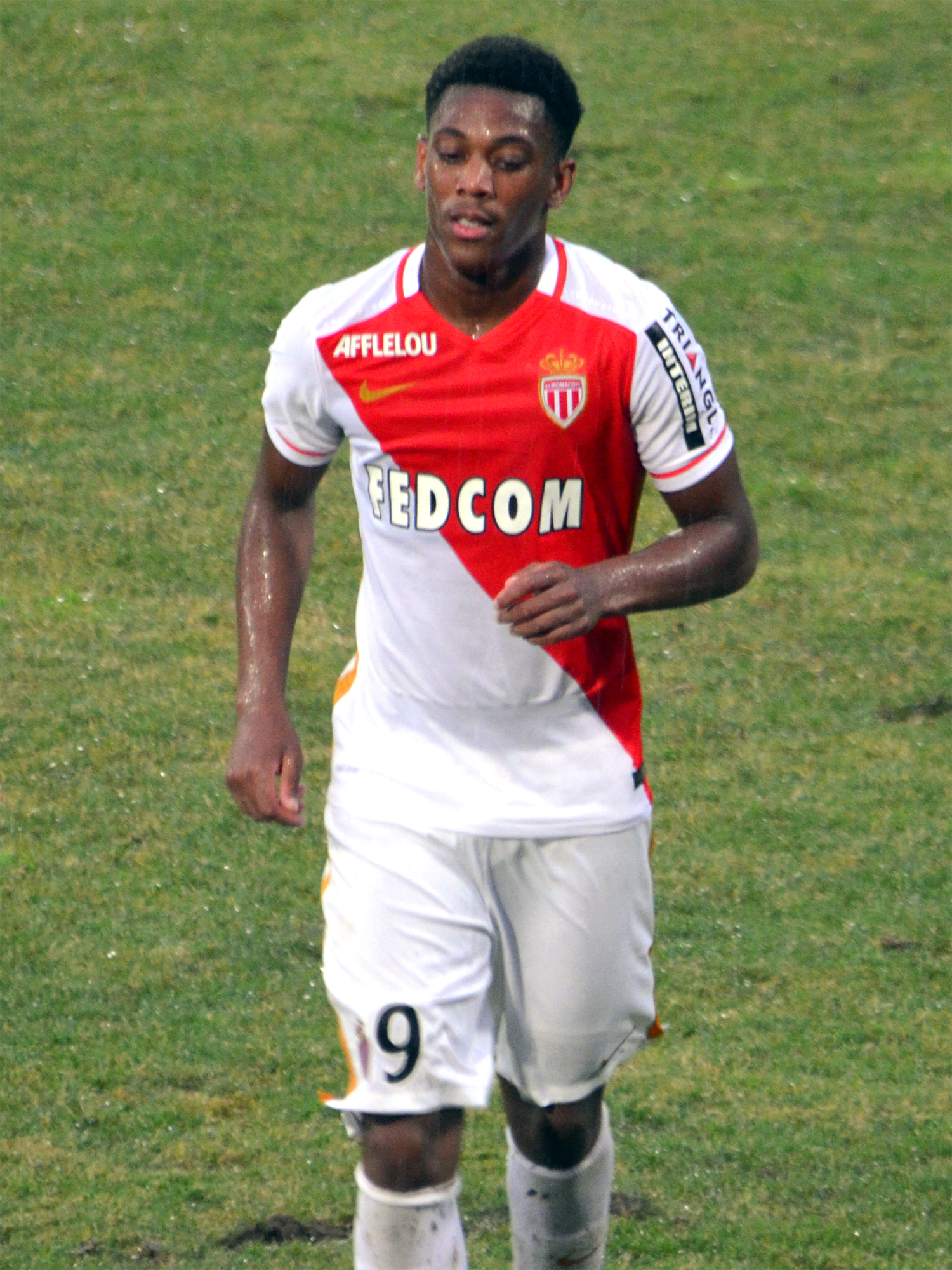
Martial playing for Monaco in 2015

On 30 June 2013, Monaco announced they had signed Martial to a three-year contract for a fee of €5 million plus bonuses. On 24 November, he made his first league appearance for the club at the age of 17, replacing Radamel Falcao after 63 minutes and playing a part in Mounir Obbadi's goal which gave victory away to Nantes. He scored his first goal for the principality club on his first start, a 2–0 win over Rennes at the Stade Louis II six days later. His campaign was disrupted by a sprained ankle against Valenciennes in December. On 27 January 2014, he extended his contract until June 2018.

In his second season at Monaco, Martial scored nine goals in 36 Ligue 1 games, starting on 5 October 2014 when as a substitute for Lucas Ocampos, he gained a 1–1 draw at reigning champions Paris Saint-Germain with a last-minute strike from close range. He scored twice against a 10-man Bastia on 13 March 2015 in a 3–0 home victory. On 26 June, he further extended his link with the team until 2019.

On 4 August 2015, Martial scored his first goal in European competition, in a 4–0 home win over Young Boys in the third qualifying round of the UEFA Champions League; Monaco advanced 7–1 on aggregate.

=== Manchester United ===
==== Transfer ====
On 1 September 2015, Martial completed a move to Manchester United for £36 million, on a four-year contract with the option of another year. This was the highest transfer fee paid for a teenager, breaking the previous record of £27 million that United had paid for Luke Shaw a year earlier, and that Paris Saint-Germain had paid for Marquinhos in 2013. United paid £36 million up front for Martial, but his contract contained three bonus clauses worth £7.2 million each, taking the potential fee to £57.6 million. £44.7 million ended up being the total fee, due to only one of the three bonus clauses being met. The clauses each related to certain accomplishments being achieved in the four years after the transfer, including if Martial scored 25 goals during that span, racked up 25 caps for France or won the Ballon d'Or before June 2019. Manager Louis van Gaal called Martial an acquisition for United's future rather than for immediate use, and called the transfer fee "ridiculous", alleging that Manchester United regularly had to pay £10 million more than other teams.

Upon signing, Martial said: "I'm so excited to join United, I have always wanted to play in the Premier League and to join the biggest club in the world is what every young footballer dreams of." Van Gaal stated, "Anthony is a naturally talented, young, multi-functional forward with great potential. I believe this is the club for him to continue his development." The fee was reportedly met with astonishment by the French public.

==== 2015–16 season ====
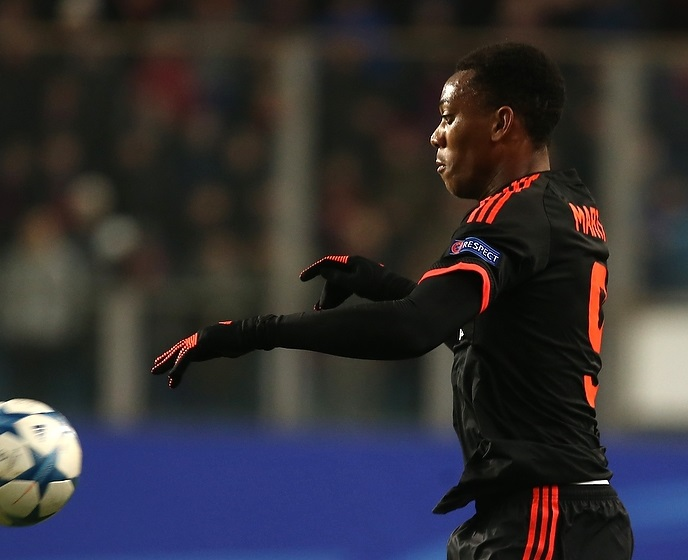
Martial playing for Manchester United in 2015

Martial made his debut in the North-West Derby at Old Trafford on 12 September as a 65th-minute substitute for Juan Mata, and scored the final goal of a 3–1 win over Liverpool. Van Gaal called it a "marvellous goal". Eight days later, in his first Premier League start, he scored twice in an away win, 3–2 at Southampton. On 23 September, again as a replacement for Mata, Martial scored his fourth goal in four games for his new club, concluding a 3–0 win over Ipswich Town in the third round of the League Cup. Martial's early impact was praised by former United manager Sir Alex Ferguson, who stated that "he can do anything".

Martial won his first individual honour at United as he picked up the 'PFA Fan's Player of the Month' for September, in which he notched up three goals from two matches. A few days later, he gained his second trophy at United, as his strike against Liverpool earned him the club's 'Goal of the Month' for September. He was also named Premier League Player of the Month for September, the third-youngest player to receive the award after Micah Richards and Michael Owen.

On 21 October, in a Champions League group stage match away to CSKA Moscow, Martial gave away a penalty – which David de Gea saved from Roman Eremenko – and later equalised to confirm a 1–1 draw. He was awarded the Golden Boy as Europe's best under-21 player on 19 December.

Martial was key in a 2–1 win against Everton in the FA Cup semi-final at Wembley on 23 April 2016: he assisted the first goal by Marouane Fellaini and scored an added-time winner. He finished the season as the club's top scorer in both the league and overall competitions with 11 goals and 17 goals respectively.

==== 2016–17 season ====
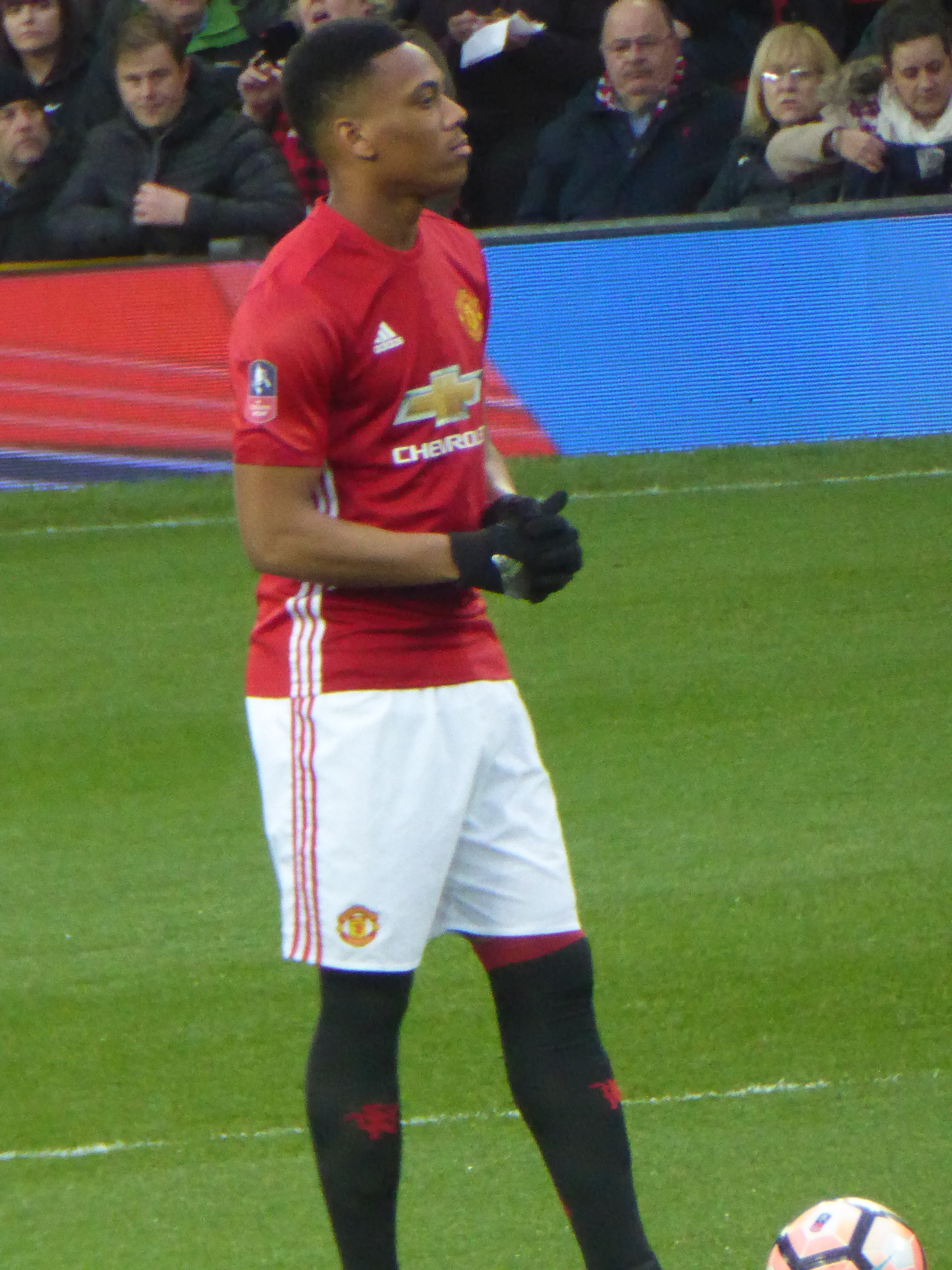
Martial playing for Manchester United in 2017

Martial retained his starting berth at Manchester United under new manager José Mourinho, starting ahead of in-form teammate Marcus Rashford on the left wing for the opening few games of the season. The forward, however, lost his place in the starting line-up after several underwhelming performances, with the club tentatively attributing Martial's difficulties to ongoing problems in his personal life. Nevertheless, on 2 October 2016, Martial came off the bench at Old Trafford to score United's only goal—his first of the new season—against Stoke City, a game that ended in a 1–1 draw.

On 30 November 2016, Martial was recalled to the side to face West Ham in the EFL Cup after receiving warnings about his starting spot in previous weeks from manager José Mourinho, he responded by scoring two goals in a 4–1 win to send United into the semi-final of the competition. Being in and out of the team for a couple of months, Martial was rumoured to leave Manchester United in the summer, but on 6 February he made it clear on his Twitter account, tweeting: "the paper's are wrong don't listen to them". Martial returned to the starting line-up against Watford at Old Trafford on 11 February by providing an assist to Juan Mata and later scoring a goal for himself in the 60th minute, he was later declared the man of the match. On 26 February, he was named in the starting XI that faced Southampton at Wembley for the 2017 EFL Cup Final, which United won 3–2. The victory earned Martial his third piece of silverware for United. In May, he won the first European trophy of his career, coming on as a substitute in the 2017 UEFA Europa League Final.

==== 2017–18 season ====
After a successful spell for Manchester United towards the end of last season, winning the League Cup and Europa League, Martial started the season as a substitute for most matches. Despite this Martial managed to score from the bench in United's first two league matches against West Ham United and Swansea City, and again later against Everton; with all three matches ending in a 4–0 win for United. Martial's first start of the season came on 20 September in a 4–1 win over Burton Albion in the League Cup in which he also scored. Martial repeated this a week later in the Champions League, scoring in a 4–1 win over CSKA Moscow. In October Martial scored United's only goal in their win over Tottenham and again in November against Watford and Newcastle United. In January, Martial scored again against Everton away, scored against Stoke City and provide the winning goal against Burnley. However following the January transfer season, Martial began to fall out of favour following the signing of Chilean forward Alexis Sánchez on 22 January. A lack of game time saw Martial fail to produce another goal for the club all season. Because of this, there was heavy speculation that Martial would leave Manchester United during the summer transfer season.

==== 2018–19 season ====
Martial made his first competitive appearance for Manchester United's 2018–19 season in their 3–2 loss to Brighton in the Premier League. Through August and September, Martial made three other substitute appearance in the Premier League until the September's final game against West Ham United saw him make the starting eleven. However, two weeks prior saw Martial start in Manchester United's Champions League opener and score his first goal of the season in a 3–0 win against Young Boys. Martial's first league goal came in a 3–2 comeback against Newcastle United where he also started. After that match Martial started and scored in every Premier League game up to the November International Break, scoring against Bournemouth, Everton, two goals against Chelsea, and a penalty goal in the Manchester derby. This spell of goal scoring saw Martial become one of seven players to have scored in five consecutive league games for Manchester United. Martial also won Manchester United's October Player of the Month award.

On 24 November, Martial started in United's goalless draw with Crystal Palace, playing the full 90 minutes. This came after speculation that he would miss the game due to an injury picked up on international duty. Martial also played the full 90 minutes against Champions League opponents Young Boys, which United won 1–0, securing their place in the knockout stage. After missing United's tie with Southampton, Martial played in the club's home game against Arsenal in which he scored his eighth goal of the season with the match ending in a 2–2 draw. On 17 December 2018, United triggered an option to extend Martial's contract that would keep him at the club until 2020. On 22 December, under new manager Ole Gunnar Solskjær, Martial scored his ninth of the season in a 5–1 victory over Cardiff City. On 25 January 2019, Martial scored Manchester United's third goal in a 3–1 win over Arsenal in the FA Cup fourth round; it was his first goal of 2019 and his 10th of the season.

On 31 January 2019, Martial signed a new five-year contract with Manchester United, keeping him at the club until summer 2024. On 9 February, Martial assisted Paul Pogba's opener before scoring United's second goal in a 3–0 win over Fulham. On 10 March, Martial returned as a substitute against Arsenal after sustaining an injury against Paris Saint-Germain a month prior. Later that month he scored the second goal in a 2–1 win over Watford.

==== 2019–20 season ====
Martial began the 2019–20 league season by starting and scoring Manchester United's second goal in a 4–0 victory over Chelsea at Old Trafford. He also scored in United's second match, a 1–1 draw away against Wolverhampton Wanderers on 19 August 2019. On his first start since returning from injury in August, Martial scored the winning penalty against Partizan Belgrade in late October, before scoring against Norwich City in a 3–1 victory the following weekend. On 24 June 2020, he scored his first senior hat-trick in a 3–0 home win against Sheffield United. This was United's first Premier League hat-trick since 22 April 2013, when Robin van Persie did so against Aston Villa en route of sealing the club's most recent league title to date.

==== 2020–21 season ====
On 4 October 2020, Martial received the first red card of his career for hitting out at Erik Lamela during United's 1–6 loss to Tottenham Hotspur in the Premier League and was later banned for three domestic games. In the UEFA Champions League group stage match against RB Leipzig on 28 October, Martial scored his first goal of the season, slotting home United's fourth goal in a 5–0 win. He scored his first league goal of the season on 17 December in a 3–2 away win against Sheffield United. He scored two goals – the only one to do so – in United's Premier League record-equalling 9–0 home win against Southampton on 2 February 2021.

==== 2021–22 season: Loan to Sevilla ====
Martial scored his first goal of the season on 2 October 2021, a first-half strike in a 1–1 draw against Everton.

On 25 January 2022, he joined Sevilla on loan until the end of the season. He debuted on 5 February in a 0–0 draw away to Osasuna in La Liga. Six days later he registered his first assist for the club, crossing for Rafa Mir to make it 2–0 in a home win over Elche.

Martial scored his first Sevilla goal on 17 February, the team's third in a 3–1 UEFA Europa League play-off win over Dinamo Zagreb at the Ramón Sánchez Pizjuán. His progress was interrupted by a muscle injury eight days later, forcing him off in the first half of a 1–1 draw at Espanyol. He returned in March and featured in both legs of the Europa League round of 16 against West Ham United.

In total, he made 12 appearances for Sevilla in all competitions, scoring once and recording one assist.

==== 2023–24 season ====
Martial played his last match for United on 9 December 2023, in a 3–0 loss to Bournemouth. On 27 May 2024, Martial announced on his Instagram page that he would leave the club as a free agent, after a nine-year stint at Old Trafford.

=== AEK Athens ===
On 19 September 2024, Martial joined Super League Greece club AEK Athens on a free transfer, signing a three-year deal through 2027 and taking the number 26 shirt. He made his debut on 20 October as a 76th-minute substitute in a 1–1 league draw against PAOK.

Martial scored his first AEK goal on 30 October, deciding the Greek Cup round of 16 first leg with a 1–0 home win over Aris. He also scored the equaliser in the second leg on 3 December (1–1 away; AEK advanced 2–1 on aggregate). His first league goal came five days later, an 87th-minute winner in a 2–1 away victory at OFI on 8 December. He subsequently scored the only goal in a 1–0 home win over Panetolikos on 25 January 2025, and netted a brace in a 5–0 win against Panserraikos on 9 February 2025.

AEK reached the Greek Cup semi-finals, where they were eliminated 6–2 on aggregate by Olympiacos (0–6 away, 2–0 home). Media reaction in Greece described his impact as decisive in tight matches—Sport24 called his winner against Panetolikos on 25 January "a moment of magic" that "unlocked" the game, while his brace in a 5–0 win over Panserraikos on 9 February was highlighted as one of his strongest displays for the club. His momentum was checked by a muscle injury suffered in early March against Olympiacos, which forced him off before half-time. He finished his time with AEK on nine goals and two assists in 24 appearances in all competitions, with Greek outlets noting his role in keeping AEK in the title race through winter in his first season.

=== Monterrey ===
On 12 September 2025, Martial joined Liga MX club Monterrey, signing a two-year deal through 2027. He scored his first goal and provided two assists in a 5–1 away victory over Mazatlán on 17 January 2026. In June 2026, Martial departed the club by mutual consent.

== International career ==
=== Youth ===
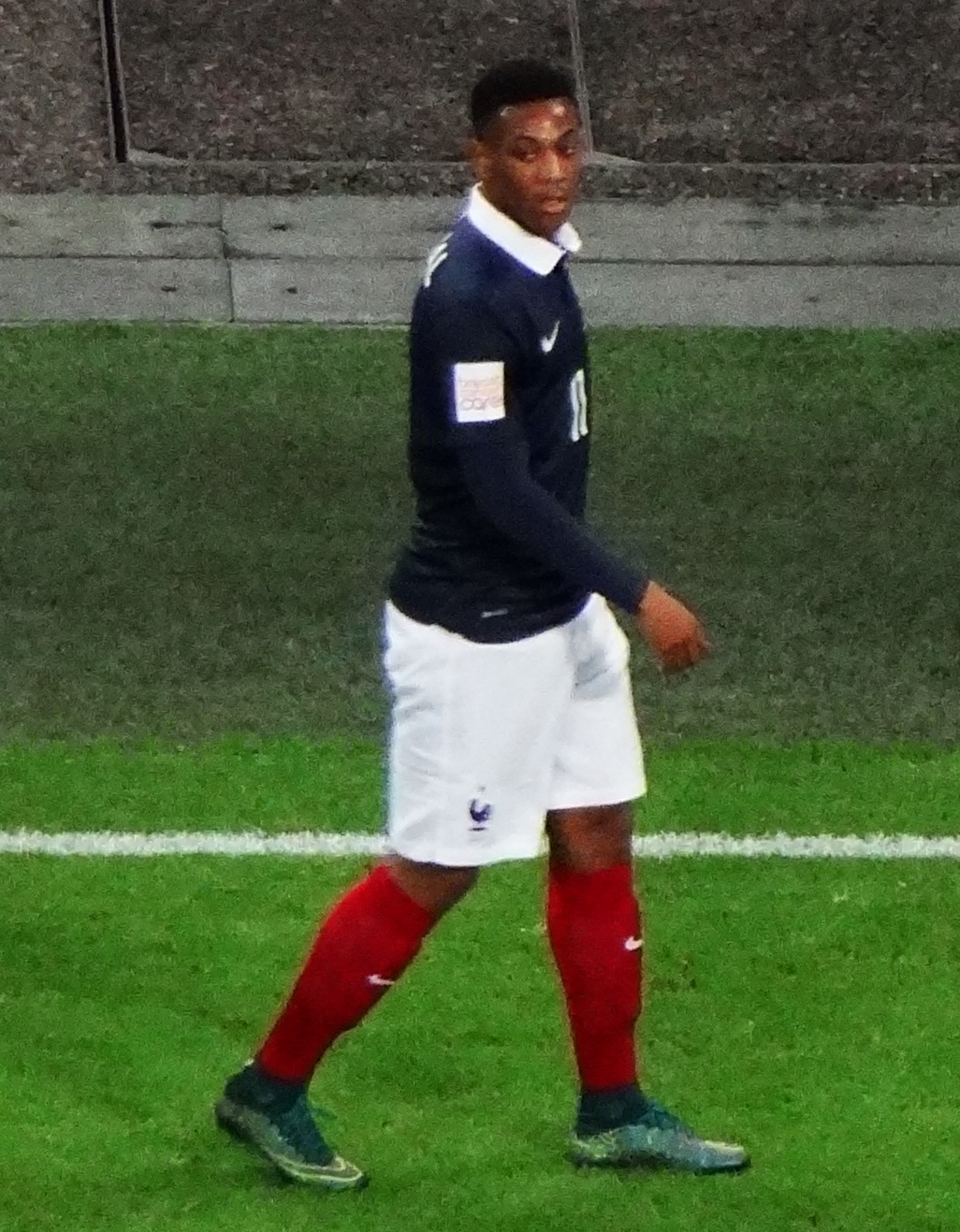
Martial playing for France in 2015

Martial scored five goals as France topped their qualification group for the 2012 UEFA European Under-17 Championship: two goals in a 5–0 win over the Faroe Islands, and a hat-trick against Northern Ireland in Luxembourg. He added two more in elite round victories against Switzerland and Sweden to confirm qualification. He netted once in a group stage exit at the final tournament in Slovenia, a 2–2 opening game draw with Iceland at the Domžale Sports Park.

Martial played all five games for France under-19 at the 2013 European Championship in Lithuania, finishing as runners-up to Serbia. He was one of five Frenchmen selected in the Team of the Tournament.

=== Senior ===
On 26 August 2015, Martial was called up to the senior France squad for the first time, for friendlies against Portugal and Serbia in the following month. He made his debut in the former on 4 September at Lisbon's Estádio José Alvalade, replacing Karim Benzema for the final 16 minutes of a 1–0 win. On 11 October, Martial made his first start for Les Bleus in a 2–1 win against Denmark at Parken Stadium, Copenhagen, and assisted the opening goal by Olivier Giroud.

Due to Martial's performances in the 2015–16 season with Manchester United, he earned a spot on France's 23-man squad for Euro 2016, in which France were the tournament runners up. On 17 May 2018, Martial was named on the standby list for the 23-man French squad for the 2018 World Cup in Russia. However, he did not make the final squad for the tournament which saw France as champions for the second time.

== Style of play ==
Aziz Benaaddane, one of Martial's coaches at Les Ulis, told the BBC Sport in 2015 that as a six-year-old, Martial was able to run in a straight line to the goal: "We've got 400 youngsters playing for us but a talent like that arrives only once every five or six years. We felt it, we saw the potential and we pushed him". Mahamadou Niakite, another coach, added that Martial was put in higher age groups, as at the age of six he had the ability of most eight-year-olds, and at around the age of 12–13 he was focused on becoming a professional.

According to journalist Philippe Auclair, Martial plays in a style similar to former French international Thierry Henry, with speed and technical ability both in wide positions and up front. Henry himself praised Martial after his goalscoring debut, while Martial himself refuted the comparison, saying: "I don't think we have the same type of game – he was very quick whereas I rely more on power and technique. But it's always good to be compared to great players".

In the aftermath of France's 2–1 win over Denmark in October 2015, Fenerbahçe defender Simon Kjær was reportedly stunned after playing against him to learn that Martial was just 19. He told French newspaper L'Équipe: "He's really good for 19. I didn't know him when I was in France. He's very, very hard to mark because he knows how to do a lot of things. Not only is he quick, but he's also technically good."

Although he has been used as a centre-forward, he primarily plays on the left flank. Martial, for his part, has said that he prefers to play up front, but that "if the coach puts me on the wing then that means it is better for the team and for me that is the most important thing."

In 2019, Christopher Simpson of Bleacher Report noted that Martial "...has pace to burn and the dribbling skills to accompany it, making him very difficult to defend against, and he's a composed finisher in front of goal too."

== Personal life ==
Martial is of Guadeloupean descent. His older brother, Johan, is a professional defender, who represented France up to under-20 level. He has another older brother, Dorian, who was the captain of the senior team at Les Ulis. His cousin, Alexis, is also a professional footballer. The Martial family placed high emphasis on the education of their children. His youth coaches describe him as a shy and quiet person. Martial is a Roman Catholic.

Martial was previously married to Samantha Jacquelinet, with whom he has a daughter, Peyton. In July 2018, his then partner, former reality television contestant Mélanie Da Cruz, gave birth to their son, Swan; Martial left Manchester United's pre-season tour to attend the birth. Martial and Da Cruz married in 2019, before announcing their separation in March 2022. He announced the birth of his third child, a son, on 28 June 2025 via Instagram.

== Career statistics ==
=== Club ===
As of match played 17 March 2026

Appearances and goals by club, season and competition
Club	Season	League			National cup (Note: Includes Coupe de France, FA Cup, Greek Cup)		League cup (Note: Includes Coupe de la Ligue, Football League/EFL Cup)		Continental		Other		Total	
Club	Season	Division	Apps	Goals	Apps	Goals	Apps	Goals	Apps	Goals	Apps	Goals	Apps	Goals
Lyon B	2012–13	CFA	11	5	—		—		—		—		11	5
Lyon	2012–13	Ligue 1	3	0	0	0	0	0	1 (Note: Appearance(s) in UEFA Europa League)	0	—		4	0
Monaco B	2013–14	CFA	4	3	—		—		—		—		4	3
Monaco	2013–14	Ligue 1	11	2	3	0	1	0	—		—		15	2
Monaco	2014–15	Ligue 1	35	9	3	2	3	1	7 (Note: Appearances in UEFA Champions League)	0	—		48	12
Monaco	2015–16	Ligue 1	3	0	—		—		4	1	—		7	1
Monaco	Total		49	11	6	2	4	1	11	1	—		70	15
Manchester United	2015–16	Premier League	31	11	7	2	2	1	9 (Note: Six appearances and two goals in UEFA Champions League, three appearances and one goal in UEFA Europa League)	3	—		49	17
Manchester United	2016–17	Premier League	25	4	3	1	3	2	10	1	1 (Note: Appearance in FA Community Shield)	0	42	8
Manchester United	2017–18	Premier League	30	9	4	0	3	1	8	1	0	0	45	11
Manchester United	2018–19	Premier League	27	10	2	1	1	0	8	1	—		38	12
Manchester United	2019–20	Premier League	32	17	5	1	4	1	7	4	—		48	23
Manchester United	2020–21	Premier League	22	4	4	0	2	1	8 (Note: Five appearances and two goals in UEFA Champions League, three appearances in UEFA Europa League)	2	—		36	7
Manchester United	2021–22	Premier League	8	1	0	0	1	0	2	0	—		11	1
Manchester United	2022–23	Premier League	21	6	2	0	3	2	3	1	—		29	9
Manchester United	2023–24	Premier League	13	1	0	0	2	1	4	0	—		19	2
Manchester United	Total		209	63	27	5	21	9	59	13	1	0	317	90
Sevilla (loan)	2021–22	La Liga	9	0	—		—		3	1	—		12	1
AEK Athens	2024–25	Super League Greece	16	7	4	2	—		—		3 (Note: Appearances in Super League Greece championship play-offs)	0	23	9
AEK Athens	2025–26	Super League Greece	0	0	—		—		1 (Note: Appearance in UEFA Conference League)	0	—		1	0
AEK Athens	Total		16	7	4	2	—		1	0	3	0	24	9
Monterrey	2025–26	Liga MX	17	1	—		—		3 (Note: Appearances in CONCACAF Champions Cup)	0	—		20	1
Career total			318	90	37	9	25	10	78	15	4	0	462	124

=== International ===
Appearances and goals by national team and year
National team	Year	Apps	Goals
France	2015	6	0
France	2016	9	1
France	2017	2	0
France	2018	1	0
France	2019	0	0
France	2020	7	0
France	2021	5	1
Total		30	2

France score listed first, score column indicates score after each Martial goal

List of international goals scored by Anthony Martial
No.	Date	Venue	Cap	Opponent	Score	Result	Competition
1	1 September 2016	Stadio San Nicola, Bari, Italy	13	Italy	1–0	3–1	Friendly
2	4 September 2021	Olimpiyskiy National Sports Complex, Kyiv, Ukraine	29	Ukraine	1–1	1–1	2022 FIFA World Cup qualification

== Honours ==
Manchester United

- FA Cup: 2015–16; runner-up: 2017–18, 2022–23
- EFL Cup: 2016–17
- FA Community Shield: 2016
- UEFA Europa League: 2016–17; runner-up: 2020–21

France U19

- UEFA European Under-19 Championship runner-up: 2013

France

- UEFA Nations League: 2020–21
- UEFA European Championship runner-up: 2016

Individual

- Golden Boy: 2015
- Premier League Player of the Month: September 2015
- PFA Fans' Premier League Player of the Month: September 2015
- UEFA European Under-19 Championship Team of the Tournament: 2013
- Manchester United Goal of the Season: 2015–16 (vs. Liverpool, 12 September 2015)
- Manchester United Players' Player of the Year: 2019–20
- Super League Greece Player of the Month: November 2024
