= Sotiris Tsiloulis =

Greek footballer

Personal information
- Full name: Sotirios Tsiloulis
- Date of birth: 14 February 1995 (age 31)
- Place of birth: Larissa, Greece
- Height: 1.85 m (6 ft 1 in)
- Position: Winger

Team information
- Current team: Atromitos
- Number: 23

Youth career
- 2009–2013: AEL

Senior career*
Years	Team	Apps	(Gls)
2013–2014	Dotieas Agia	28	(4)
2014–2015	Serres	19	(3)
2015–2016	Lamia	0	(0)
2016–2017	Anagennisi Karditsa	42	(13)
2017–2018	Apollon Larissa	26	(8)
2018–2020	Panionios	52	(6)
2020–2022	Apollon Smyrnis	49	(5)
2022–2024	Lamia	56	(7)
2024–2025	AEK Athens	6	(0)
2025–	Atromitos	13	(2)
- * Club domestic league appearances and goals as of 19 September 2026

Sotiris Tsiloulis (Greek: Σωτήρης Τσιλούλης; born 14 February 1995) is a Greek professional footballer who plays as a winger for Super League club Atromitos.

== Career ==
=== Panionios ===
On 28 April 2018, Tsiloulis signed a four-year contract with top tier club Panionios.

=== Apollon Smyrnis ===
On 6 September 2020, he joined Apollon Smyrnis on a free transfer. He scored his first goal in a 3–1 home defeat against PAOK, on 8 November 2020. On 30 November 2020, he opened the score in an eventual 3–3 home draw against Volos, despite a three-goal cushion early in the first half.

On 16 January 2021, he scored helping to a 1–0 away win against AEL.

== Career statistics ==
As of 30 March 2025

Club	Season	League			Cup		Continental		Other		Total	
Club	Season	Division	Apps	Goals	Apps	Goals	Apps	Goals	Apps	Goals	Apps	Goals
Dotieas Agias	2013–14	Gamma Ethniki	28	4	0	0	—		—		28	4
Serres	2014–15	Super League Greece 2	19	3	4	0	—		—		23	3
Lamia	2015–16	Super League Greece 2	0	0	0	0	—		—		0	0
Anagennisi Karditsa	2015–16	Super League Greece 2	15	4	—		—		—		15	4
Anagennisi Karditsa	2016–17	Super League Greece 2	27	9	2	0	—		—		29	9
Anagennisi Karditsa	Total		42	13	2	0	—		—		44	13
Apollon Larissa	2017–18	Super League Greece 2	26	8	2	0	—		—		28	8
Panionios	2018–19	Super League Greece	23	2	7	1	—		—		30	3
Panionios	2019–20	Super League Greece	29	4	4	3	—		—		33	7
Panionios	Total		52	6	11	4	—		—		63	10
Apollon Smyrnis	2020–21	Super League Greece	25	4	1	0	—		—		26	4
Apollon Smyrnis	2021–22	Super League Greece	24	1	1	0	—		—		25	1
Apollon Smyrnis	Total		49	5	2	0	—		—		51	5
Lamia	2022–23	Super League Greece	26	2	4	2	—		—		30	4
Lamia	2023–24	Super League Greece	30	5	1	0	—		—		31	5
Lamia	Total		56	7	5	0	—		—		61	9
AEK Athens B	2024–25	Super League Greece 2	2	1	0	0	—		—		2	1
AEK Athens	2024–25	Super League Greece	6	0	1	0	—		—		7	0
Career total			279	47	27	6	0	0	0	0	306	53
