= 2015–16 Manchester United F.C. season =

English football club season

Manchester United
2015–16 season
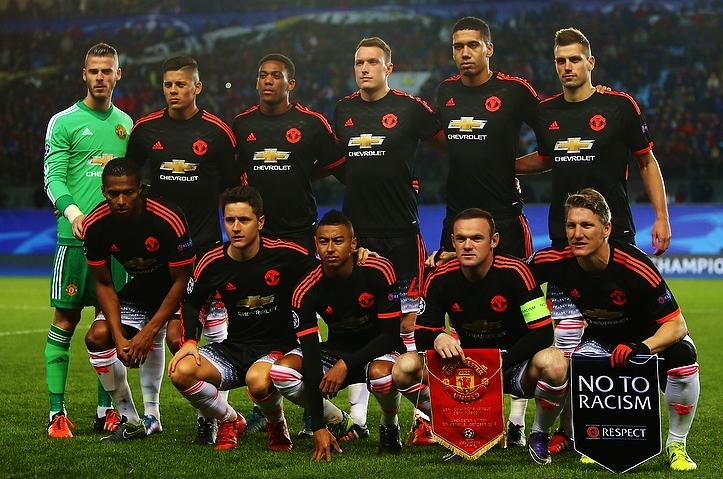
- Manchester United players before the UEFA Champions League game against CSKA Moscow
- Co-chairmen: Joel and Avram Glazer
- Manager: Louis van Gaal
- Stadium: Old Trafford
- Premier League: 5th
- FA Cup: Winners
- League Cup: Fourth round
- UEFA Champions League: Group stage
- UEFA Europa League: Round of 16
- Top goalscorer: League: Anthony Martial (11); All: Anthony Martial (17)
- Highest home attendance: 75,415 (vs. Swansea City, 2 January)
- Lowest home attendance: 56,607 (vs. Ipswich Town, 23 September)
- Average home league attendance: 75,279
Home colours	Away colours	Third colours

The 2015–16 season was Manchester United's 24th season in the Premier League, and their 41st consecutive season in the top flight of English football. Along with the Premier League, the club also competed in the FA Cup, Football League Cup, UEFA Champions League and UEFA Europa League. The season saw Manchester United win a then record-equalling 12th FA Cup with a 2–1 victory over Crystal Palace in the 2016 FA Cup Final.

== Pre-season and friendlies ==
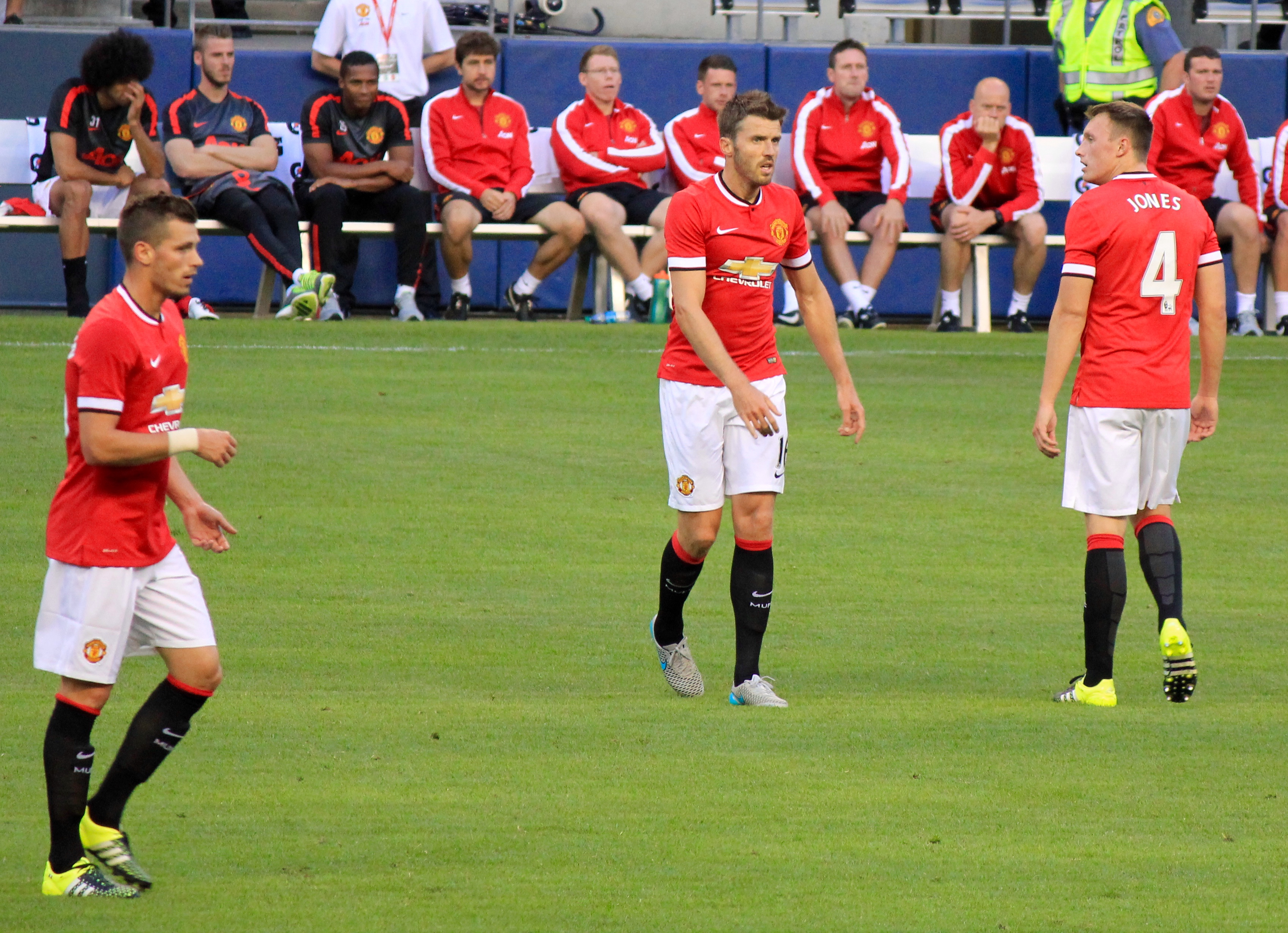
Manchester United players during the match against Club America in July 2015

Manchester United announced a shortened pre-season tour of the United States on 28 April 2015. The first match against Mexican side Club América was played on 17 July at CenturyLink Field in Seattle, and was followed, four days later, by a game against Major League Soccer's San Jose Earthquakes at the Earthquakes' home ground, Avaya Stadium in San Jose. It was originally scheduled to be played at California Memorial Stadium in Berkeley, but it was moved to reduce the amount of travelling the team would have to do. Four days later, Manchester United faced European champions Barcelona at Levi's Stadium in Santa Clara, California, before completing the campaign at Chicago's Soldier Field with a game against Paris Saint-Germain.

Date	Opponents	H / A	Result F–A	Scorers	Attendance
17 July 2015	Club América	N	1–0	Schneiderlin 5'	46,857
21 July 2015	San Jose Earthquakes	A	3–1	Mata 32', Depay 36', A. Pereira 61'	18,000
25 July 2015	Barcelona	N	3–1	Rooney 8', Lingard 65', Januzaj 90'	68,416
29 July 2015	Paris Saint-Germain	N	0–2		61,351

== Premier League ==
=== August ===
The fixtures for this league season were announced on 17 June 2015 at 09:00 BST. Manchester United began their campaign with a 1–0 win at home to Tottenham Hotspur on 8 August, with an own goal from Kyle Walker proving the difference between the two teams.

United then went top of the League for the first time since August 2013 with another 1–0 win over Aston Villa at Villa Park the following Friday; Adnan Januzaj's goal in the 29th minute was his first since April 2014. The game had moved to Friday for policing reasons due to an English Defence League march in nearby Walsall the following day, a decision which also gave United an extra day to prepare for their UEFA Champions League play-off against Club Brugge. United kept a third clean sheet in a row at home to Newcastle United on 22 August, but the forwards were unable to find the net and the match finished as a goalless draw.

In the final fixture before the first international break, United conceded their first goals of the season as they lost 2–1 to Swansea City at the Liberty Stadium. After going ahead early in the second half through Juan Mata, they conceded twice in five minutes just after the hour mark, first to a header from André Ayew, who then provided the assist for Bafétimbi Gomis.

=== September ===
Following the international break, Manchester United returned to action with a home match against Liverpool. The first half was goalless, but goals from Daley Blind and Ander Herrera gave them the lead going into the last ten minutes. Christian Benteke then pulled one back for Liverpool with a bicycle kick before deadline day signing Anthony Martial scored a debut goal to seal a 3–1 win. Martial continued his scoring when United won 3–2 away to Southampton. Graziano Pellè first gave Southampton the lead before Martial scored a brace; the first goal before halftime and the second goal after. United also added a third goal from Juan Mata before Pellè could score his second and the final goal of the match.

On 26 September, United went on top of the league again after beating Sunderland at home. Memphis Depay opened the scoring in first half stoppage time and Wayne Rooney scored 40 seconds into the second half – ending his longest barren spell in the Premier League after not scoring in 11 matches – before Juan Mata scored the final goal in the last minute of regular time to secure a 3–0 win.

=== October ===
In their next match, 4 October, the last match before a new international break, United suffered a 3–0 defeat against Arsenal at Emirates Stadium, which was their worst defeat against the Gunners in the league for 17 years. Arsenal drew first blood through an Alexis Sánchez goal in the sixth minute before Mesut Özil added to the score barely 74 seconds later. Sánchez completed his brace in the 19th minute to condemn United to their second loss in the League this season, which made United drop to third in the league standings, behind Arsenal on goal difference.

After the international break, United travelled to Goodison Park to play Everton. After having lost 3–0 at the stadium the previous season, they won by the same scoreline after two early goals from Morgan Schneiderlin, Ander Herrera and a goal in the 62nd minute from United captain and former Everton player Wayne Rooney.

Their next match was the Manchester derby against Manchester City at Old Trafford. The match ended goalless, for the first time since 2010. Their next game, against Crystal Palace ended goalless as well, meaning United were down to fourth place at the end of the month.

=== November ===
United's first match of November saw them beat West Bromwich Albion 2–0 at Old Trafford. Jesse Lingard scored his first goal for the club seven minutes into the second half. In the first minute of stoppage time, West Brom went down to ten men after Gareth McAuley was sent off following a foul on Anthony Martial, which gave United a penalty, which Juan Mata took to seal the win for United.

After another international break, United faced Watford at Vicarage Road for the first time since 2006. Memphis Depay opened the scoring in the 11th minute after he volleyed a cross from Ander Herrera. Watford equalised late on through a Troy Deeney penalty, but then he put it into his own goal in stoppage time to give United back–to–back victories. On the following Saturday, they travelled to the King Power Stadium to play Leicester City. Jamie Vardy opened the scoring in the 24th minute, scoring in his 11th consecutive game. Bastian Schweinsteiger levelled the match before half–time, and no goals were scored in the second half, meaning both sides shared the points.

=== December ===
The club's first match of December was a goalless draw against West Ham United at Old Trafford. On 12 December, United travelled to Dean Court to face AFC Bournemouth, who were new to the Premier League. They fell behind after two minutes when Junior Stanislas struck the first goal from a corner. Marouane Fellaini levelled 22 minutes later, but Bournemouth hit back after Joshua King headed home the winner in the 54th minute.

They then suffered a second loss in a row, this time at home to another newly promoted side, this time it was Norwich City. Cameron Jerome headed in the opener seven minutes before half–time, then Alexander Tettey put the visitors 2–0 up in the 54th minute. Martial pulled one back but it was not enough, and it meant United were out of the top four (and, like in the 2013–14 season, when David Moyes was manager, they stayed out for the remainder of the season).

On Boxing Day, United travelled to the Britannia Stadium to face Stoke City. Yet again, it was another defeat, this time it was 2–0, meaning that United lost three matches in a row like what happened in May the previous season. Their final game of 2015 was a goalless draw at home to struggling and defending champions Chelsea. This meant United ended 2015 in sixth position after a run of six league games without a win, their worst run of results since January 1990.

=== January ===
United started 2016 with a home game against Swansea, and gained revenge on the Swans for their three–straight defeats by winning 2–1. It was United's first win since the away match against Watford in November. Anthony Martial headed in the opener two minutes into the second half. Gylfi Sigurðsson levelled in the 70th minute, but seven minutes later, Wayne Rooney flicked home the winner. Their next match saw them travel to St James' Park to play Newcastle. Rooney scored a penalty in the ninth minute before Jesse Lingard added his name to the scoresheet 29 minutes later. Georgino Wijnaldum pulled one back for Newcastle before half–time, then in the second half, Newcastle scored a penalty courtesy of Aleksandar Mitrović in the 67th minute. Twelve minutes later, Rooney pulled one back for United, but Paul Dummett equalised in the 90th minute, ending the match 3–3.

United returned to winning ways in their next match, defeating arch-rivals Liverpool 1–0, courtesy of a late Wayne Rooney strike. However United struggled initially to build on this victory, losing their next match at home to Southampton, with Charlie Austin scoring a late winner. United were subsequently booed off at full time by their fans. This result left United five points off of the top four at the end of the month.

=== February ===
United kick-started February in scintillating form, defeating Stoke City 3–0 at Old Trafford. Jesse Lingard, Antony Martial and Wayne Rooney supplied the goals. In the next game, United secured a strong point against Chelsea, drawing 1–1. Jesse Lingard opened the scoring on the hour mark, before a defensive lapse allowed Diego Costa to rescue a point for Chelsea in the closing stages of the match. One week later, United suffered a surprise defeat to relegation-contenders Sunderland, going down 2–1. Anthony Martial cancelled out an early Wahbi Khazri opener, before a De Gea own goal provided Sunderland with the three points.

An injury-hit United however rallied in their next match, gaining a surprise (given the circumstances) victory over Arsenal at Old Trafford, winning 3–2. This game was noticeable for the emergence of Marcus Rashford, who scored a brace on his Premier League debut. Danny Welbeck and Mesut Özil both scored for Arsenal, yet Rashford's brace and a deflected Ander Herrera effort secured the win for United.

=== March ===
United won their opening fixture in March, defeating a stubborn Watford side 1–0, with Juan Mata securing the three points with an 83rd minute free-kick. However, in the next fixture, United lost 1–0 to West Bromwich Albion. Juan Mata was sent off in the first half, with United struggling with the man disadvantage. This was West Bromwich Albion's first home victory over United in 32 years.

United's next match was away to rivals Manchester City. Both sides were embroiled in a battle for a place in the Champions League. United won the derby, with Marcus Rashford continuing his meteoric rise by scoring the winner. Rashford became the youngest scorer in the history of the Manchester derby after his goal. The win kept the top-four hopes of United alive. Manager Louis Van Gaal also attracted praise for placing his faith in his young squad. This faith reaped dividends as United marched on.

=== April ===
United maintained momentum by beating Everton 1–0 at the start of April. Anthony Martial continued his fine season by scoring a second-half winner. This win left United just one point behind fourth-placed Manchester City. Yet United were unable to capitalise on their recent gains, losing 3–0 to Tottenham in the next game. This meant United fell further behind City.

Yet United returned to winning ways in their next match – defeating Aston Villa 1–0. Once again, Marcus Rashford scored the winner. United rounded off April with a 2–0 win over Crystal Palace. A Damien Delaney own goal was followed up by a Matteo Darmian effort to keep United in the top-four race.

=== May ===
United began the final month of the season with a 1–1 home draw against eventual champions Leicester. Anthony Martial gave United an early lead, yet Wes Morgan equalised. Despite dominating possession, United were unable to force a winner. United kept their Champions League hopes alive with a 1–0 away victory over Norwich City. Juan Mata scored the winner.

After Manchester City slipped up, United knew two wins from their final two games would secure a top-four finish. However United failed to capitalise on this opportunity, losing 3–2 at West Ham, a club that also had an outside chance of claiming a top-four finish. This was the final game at the Boleyn Ground. United led the match 2–1 courtesy of an Anthony Martial double, yet West Ham produced a late fightback, which appeared to doom any chance of a top-four finish for United.

United required Manchester City to lose to Swansea to stand any reasonable chance of a top-four finish. United had a home fixture with Bournemouth to end the campaign. However, while both games were due to kick-off at the same time on 15 May, a 'suspect package' was found at Old Trafford, leading to a full stadium evacuation. The match was eventually postponed amid safety fears, and the incident was subsequently revealed to be a hoax, being labelled a 'fiasco'. This bizarre set of circumstances deprived United of a chance to apply pressure on City, who ultimately drew to Swansea to secure a top-four finish. United's match against Bournemouth was re-arranged for 17 May, two days after intended kick-off, and they closed the campaign in style, winning 3–1 with goals from Wayne Rooney, Marcus Rashford and Ashley Young. United would miss out on Champions League football on goal difference to their city rivals, however, a fifth-place finish was good enough to qualify for Europa League football in the next season.

=== Matches ===
Date	Opponents	H / A	Result F–A	Scorers	Attendance	League position
8 August 2015	Tottenham Hotspur	H	1–0	Walker 22' (o.g.)	75,261	4th
14 August 2015	Aston Villa	A	1–0	Januzaj 29'	42,200	1st
22 August 2015	Newcastle United	H	0–0		75,354	2nd
30 August 2015	Swansea City	A	1–2	Mata 48'	20,828	5th
12 September 2015	Liverpool	H	3–1	Blind 49', Herrera 70' (pen.), Martial 86'	75,347	2nd
20 September 2015	Southampton	A	3–2	Martial (2) 34', 50', Mata 68'	31,588	2nd
26 September 2015	Sunderland	H	3–0	Depay 45+4', Rooney 46', Mata 90'	75,328	1st
4 October 2015	Arsenal	A	0–3		60,084	3rd
17 October 2015	Everton	A	3–0	Schneiderlin 18', Herrera 22', Rooney 62'	39,553	2nd
25 October 2015	Manchester City	H	0–0		75,329	4th
31 October 2015	Crystal Palace	A	0–0		24,854	4th
7 November 2015	West Bromwich Albion	H	2–0	Lingard 52', Mata 90+1' (pen.)	75,410	4th
21 November 2015	Watford	A	2–1	Depay 11', Deeney 90' (o.g.)	20,702	2nd
28 November 2015	Leicester City	A	1–1	Schweinsteiger 45'	32,115	3rd
5 December 2015	West Ham United	H	0–0		75,350	4th
12 December 2015	AFC Bournemouth	A	1–2	Fellaini 24'	11,334	4th
19 December 2015	Norwich City	H	1–2	Martial 67'	75,320	5th
26 December 2015	Stoke City	A	0–2		27,426	6th
28 December 2015	Chelsea	H	0–0		75,275	6th
2 January 2016	Swansea City	H	2–1	Martial 47', Rooney 77'	75,415	5th
12 January 2016	Newcastle United	A	3–3	Rooney (2) 9' (pen.), 79', Lingard 38'	49,673	6th
17 January 2016	Liverpool	A	1–0	Rooney 78'	43,865	5th
23 January 2016	Southampton	H	0–1		75,408	5th
2 February 2016	Stoke City	H	3–0	Lingard 14', Martial 23', Rooney 53'	75,234	5th
7 February 2016	Chelsea	A	1–1	Lingard 61'	41,434	5th
13 February 2016	Sunderland	A	1–2	Martial 39'	41,687	5th
28 February 2016	Arsenal	H	3–2	Rashford (2) 29', 32', Herrera 65'	75,329	5th
2 March 2016	Watford	H	1–0	Mata 83'	75,282	5th
6 March 2016	West Bromwich Albion	A	0–1		24,878	6th
20 March 2016	Manchester City	A	1–0	Rashford 16'	54,557	6th
3 April 2016	Everton	H	1–0	Martial 54'	75,341	5th
10 April 2016	Tottenham Hotspur	A	0–3		35,761	5th
16 April 2016	Aston Villa	H	1–0	Rashford 32'	75,411	5th
20 April 2016	Crystal Palace	H	2–0	Delaney 4' (o.g.), Darmian 55'	75,277	5th
1 May 2016	Leicester City	H	1–1	Martial 8'	75,275	5th
7 May 2016	Norwich City	A	1–0	Mata 72'	27,132	5th
10 May 2016	West Ham United	A	2–3	Martial (2) 51', 72'	34,602	5th
17 May 2016	AFC Bournemouth	H	3–1	Rooney 43', Rashford 74', Young 87'	74,363	5th

=== League table ===
Pos	Team	Pld	W	D	L	GF	GA	GD	Pts	Qualification or relegation
3	Tottenham Hotspur	38	19	13	6	69	35	+34	70	Qualification for the Champions League group stage
4	Manchester City	38	19	9	10	71	41	+30	66	Qualification for the Champions League play-off round
5	Manchester United	38	19	9	10	49	35	+14	66	Qualification for the Europa League group stage (Note: Manchester United qualified for the Europa League group stage by winning the 2015–16 FA Cup. As they had also qualified by their virtue of their league position (5th), this spot was passed to the next-highest ranked team (6th), Southampton.)
6	Southampton	38	18	9	11	59	41	+18	63	Qualification for the Europa League group stage
7	West Ham United	38	16	14	8	65	51	+14	62	Qualification for the Europa League third qualifying round (Note: Manchester City qualified for the Europa League third qualifying round by winning the 2015–16 Football League Cup. However, since they already qualified for European competition based on their league position, the spot awarded to the League Cup winners was passed to the next best-placed team (seventh-placed West Ham United).)

Source: Premier League
Rules for classification: 1) Points; 2) Goal difference; 3) Goals scored; 4) Play-offs (only if needed to decide champion, teams for relegation or teams for UEFA competitions).

== FA Cup ==
United entered the FA Cup in the third round together with the other Premier League clubs, as well as those from the Championship. The draw was made on 7 December 2015, which saw United drawn at home to Sheffield United from League One. United got their first shot on target through substitute Memphis Depay, who was fouled in second half stoppage time by Dean Hammond for a penalty kick, from which Wayne Rooney scored the only goal with United's only other shot on target. Manager Louis van Gaal was under pressure for Manchester United's poor form prior to the match, and the victory was compared to one in the same competition in 1990, in which a goal by Mark Robins reportedly saved the career of Alex Ferguson.

Twenty days later in the next round, United travelled to Pride Park to play Derby County, situated in the play-off places in the Championship. Rooney scored the first goal from outside the penalty area, but George Thorne soon equalised. In the second half, further United goals by Daley Blind and Juan Mata relieved Van Gaal of further pressure; it was the first time in 15 games that the team won by a margin of more than one goal.

On 22 February, United played the fifth round away at League One strugglers Shrewsbury Town. Chris Smalling opened the scoring, and Mata doubled the advantage in first-half added time. Jesse Lingard confirmed a 3–0 win with about half an hour left to play; in the closing stages United had to play with only 10 men when Will Keane was injured and no substitutes remained.

United hosted their sixth-round match against top-flight opponents West Ham United on 13 March. The visitors took the lead via a free-kick from Dimitri Payet, and only seven minutes remained when the hosts equalised with Anthony Martial's close-range finish. A month later, the game went to a replay, the final FA Cup match at the Boleyn Ground. A curled effort from Marcus Rashford gave Manchester United a lead in the second half, and the lead was doubled by Marouane Fellaini. West Ham halved the deficit late on after James Tomkins' header passed into David de Gea's net, and they threatened an equaliser but could not achieve it.

On 23 April, Manchester United travelled to Wembley to play Everton in the semi-finals. Martial assisted Fellaini to open the scoring against his former team, giving a half-time lead. After the break, a penalty was given when Timothy Fosu-Mensah fouled Ross Barkley, but De Gea saved the spot-kick after Romelu Lukaku took it. Everton brought on Gerard Deulofeu whose cross was put into United's net via a Chris Smalling own goal to level the scores. In added time, Ander Herrera set up Martial for the winner.

United's opponents for the final were Crystal Palace, in a repeat of the 1990 showpiece which United won after a replay. Palace took the lead in the 78th minute through Jason Puncheon but Juan Mata equalised three minutes later, taking the match into extra time. Chris Smalling became the fourth player in FA Cup final history to be sent off, for a second bookable offence just before the end of the first period of extra time. With 10 minutes to go, Jesse Lingard scored the winner for United with a right-foot volley, clinching the club's record-equalling 12th FA Cup.

Date	Round	Opponents	H / A	Result F–A	Scorers	Attendance
9 January 2016	Round 3	Sheffield United	H	1–0	Rooney 90+3' (pen.)	74,284
29 January 2016	Round 4	Derby County	A	3–1	Rooney 16', Blind 65', Mata 83'	31,134
22 February 2016	Round 5	Shrewsbury Town	A	3–0	Smalling 37', Mata 45'+2, Lingard 61'	9,370
13 March 2016	Round 6	West Ham United	H	1–1	Martial 83'	74,298
13 April 2016	Round 6 Replay	West Ham United	A	2–1	Rashford 54', Fellaini 67'	33,505
23 April 2016	Semi-final	Everton	N	2–1	Fellaini 34', Martial 90+3'	86,064
21 May 2016	Final	Crystal Palace	N	2–1 (a.e.t.)	Mata 81', Lingard 110'	88,610

== League Cup ==
As one of eight English clubs who qualified for European competition in the 2014–15 season, United received a bye to the third round of the League Cup. The draw for the third round took place on 25 August and paired United with Championship side Ipswich Town. United won the game against Ipswich 3–0, with goals from Rooney, a direct free kick by academy product Andreas Pereira, and the final goal from in-form substitute Martial. The draw for the fourth round was held on 23 September 2015. United were drawn at home to Middlesbrough from the Championship. United lost 3–1 on penalties after a goalless draw after extra time.

Date	Round	Opponents	H / A	Result F–A	Scorers	Attendance
23 September 2015	Round 3	Ipswich Town	H	3–0	Rooney 23', A. Pereira 60', Martial 90+2'	56,607
28 October 2015	Round 4	Middlesbrough	H	0–0 (a.e.t.) (1–3p)		67,258

== UEFA Champions League ==
=== Play-off round ===
Having finished fourth in the league last season, Manchester United began their UEFA Champions League campaign in the play-off round. They were seeded in the 'League Route' for the draw, which took place in Nyon on 7 August 2015. United were drawn in a two-legged tie against Belgian Pro League runners-up Club Brugge, which they won 7–1 on aggregate, ensuring their place in the group stage after a one-season absence.

Date	Round	Opponents	H / A	Result F–A	Scorers	Attendance
18 August 2015	Play-off round First leg	Club Brugge	H	3–1	Depay (2) 13', 43', Fellaini 90+4'	75,312
26 August 2015	Play-off round Second leg	Club Brugge	A	4–0	Rooney (3) 20', 49', 57', Herrera 63'	28,733

=== Group stage ===
The group stage draw was made on 27 August 2015 in Monaco. Manchester United were drawn into Group B with Dutch champions PSV, the runners-up from Russia and Germany, CSKA Moscow and VfL Wolfsburg. Manchester United had been drawn in the same group as CSKA Moscow and Wolfsburg in 2009–10, while they had met PSV in the first group stage of the 2000–01 competition. United suffered a shock defeat to PSV in the first game as the hosts came from behind to win 2–1, after Depay scored the opener following his brace against Club Brugge in the play-offs. Héctor Moreno levelled the game at half-time, and Luciano Narsingh sealed the game in the 56th minute. In the 24th minute, United's in-form left-back Luke Shaw suffered a broken leg in a challenge with Moreno, keeping him out for six months.

Date	Opponents	H / A	Result F–A	Scorers	Attendance	Group position
15 September 2015	PSV	A	1–2	Depay 41'	35,292	3rd
30 September 2015	VfL Wolfsburg	H	2–1	Mata 34' (pen.), Smalling 52'	74,811	2nd
21 October 2015	CSKA Moscow	A	1–1	Martial 65'	18,156	2nd
3 November 2015	CSKA Moscow	H	1–0	Rooney 79'	75,165	1st
25 November 2015	PSV	H	0–0		75,321	2nd
8 December 2015	VfL Wolfsburg	A	2–3	Martial 10', Guilavogui 82' (o.g.)	26,400	3rd

Pos	Team	Pld	W	D	L	GF	GA	GD	Pts	Qualification
1	(Germany) VfL Wolfsburg	6	4	0	2	9	6	+3	12	Advance to knockout phase
2	(Netherlands) PSV Eindhoven	6	3	1	2	8	7	+1	10	Advance to knockout phase
3	(England) Manchester United	6	2	2	2	7	7	0	8	Transfer to Europa League
4	(Russia) CSKA Moscow	6	1	1	4	5	9	−4	4	

Source: UEFA
Rules for classification: Group stage tiebreakers

== UEFA Europa League ==
As one of the best four third-placed finishers in the Champions League group stage, United were seeded for the Europa League round of 32 draw, along with the group stage winners. The draw took place on 14 December 2015 and saw United drawn against Danish champions Midtjylland, with the away tie taking place on 18 February and the home tie on 25 February 2016. Despite taking the lead, United overcame a 2–1 deficit from the first leg to win 6–3 on aggregate. The round of 16 draw, which was held on 26 February, pitted United with rivals Liverpool for the first European meeting between the sides. United exited the tournament, losing 3–1 on aggregate.

Date	Round	Opponents	H / A	Result F–A	Scorers	Attendance
18 February 2016	Round of 32; First leg	Midtjylland	A	1–2	Depay 37'	9,182
25 February 2016	Round of 32; Second leg	Midtjylland	H	5–1	Bodurov 32' (o.g.), Rashford (2) 63', 75', Herrera 88' (pen.), Depay 90'	58,609
10 March 2016	Round of 16; First leg	Liverpool	A	0–2		43,228
17 March 2016	Round of 16; Second leg	Liverpool	H	1–1	Martial 32' (pen.)	75,180

== Squad statistics ==
No.	Pos.	Name	League		FA Cup		League Cup		Europe		Total		Discipline	
No.	Pos.	Name	Apps	Goals	Apps	Goals	Apps	Goals	Apps	Goals	Apps	Goals	Yellow card	Red card
1	GK	(Spain) David de Gea	34	0	6	0	1	0	8	0	49	0	0	0
4	DF	(England) Phil Jones	6(4)	0	0	0	0(1)	0	1(1)	0	7(6)	0	0	0
5	DF	(Argentina) Marcos Rojo	15(1)	0	4	0	1	0	5(2)	0	25(3)	0	5	0
6	DF	(Northern Ireland) Jonny Evans	0	0	0	0	0	0	0	0	0	0	0	0
7	FW	(Netherlands) Memphis Depay	16(13)	2	1(2)	0	1(1)	0	9(2)	5	27(18)	7	4	0
8	MF	(Spain) Juan Mata	34(4)	6	4	3	1	0	10(1)	1	49(5)	10	5	1
9	FW	(France) Anthony Martial	29(2)	11	7	2	0(2)	1	9	3	45(4)	17	4	0
10	FW	(England) Wayne Rooney (c)	27(1)	8	4(1)	2	1(1)	1	6	4	38(3)	15	6	0
11	MF	(Belgium) Adnan Januzaj	2(3)	1	0	0	0	0	2	0	4(3)	1	1	0
12	DF	(England) Chris Smalling	35	0	7	1	2	0	11	1	55	2	11	1
13	GK	(Denmark) Anders Lindegaard	0	0	0	0	0	0	0	0	0	0	0	0
14	FW	(Mexico) Javier Hernández	0(1)	0	0	0	0	0	0(2)	0	0(3)	0	0	0
16	MF	(England) Michael Carrick (vc)	22(6)	0	4(1)	0	1	0	6(2)	0	33(9)	0	6	0
17	MF	(Netherlands) Daley Blind	35	1	7	1	2	0	11(1)	0	55(1)	2	3	0
18	MF	(England) Ashley Young	11(7)	1	0(1)	0	1(1)	0	2(3)	0	14(12)	1	6	0
19	FW	(England) James Wilson	0(1)	0	0	0	1	0	0	0	1(1)	0	0	0
20	GK	(Argentina) Sergio Romero	4	0	1	0	1	0	4	0	10	0	0	0
21	MF	(Spain) Ander Herrera	17(10)	3	4(2)	0	1	0	5(2)	2	27(14)	5	8	0
22	MF	(England) Nick Powell	0(1)	0	0	0	0	0	0(1)	0	0(2)	0	0	0
23	DF	(England) Luke Shaw	5	0	0	0	0	0	3	0	8	0	1	0
25	MF	(Ecuador) Antonio Valencia	8(6)	0	1(2)	0	1	0	2(2)	0	12(10)	0	1	0
27	MF	(Belgium) Marouane Fellaini	12(6)	1	6	2	2	0	3(5)	1	23(11)	4	7	0
28	MF	(France) Morgan Schneiderlin	25(4)	1	2(1)	0	0	0	6(1)	0	33(6)	1	4	0
30	MF	(Uruguay) Guillermo Varela	3(1)	0	3	0	0	0	4	0	10(1)	0	2	0
31	MF	(Germany) Bastian Schweinsteiger	13(5)	1	1(1)	0	1	0	6(4)	0	21(10)	1	5	0
33	DF	(Northern Ireland) Paddy McNair	3(5)	0	0	0	0	0	1	0	4(5)	0	0	0
34	GK	(England) Dean Henderson	0	0	0	0	0	0	0	0	0	0	0	0
35	MF	(England) Jesse Lingard	19(6)	4	5(2)	2	1	0	7	0	32(8)	6	8	0
36	DF	(Italy) Matteo Darmian	24(4)	1	1(2)	0	1	0	6(1)	0	32(7)	1	10	0
37	DF	(Scotland) Donald Love	0(1)	0	0	0	0	0	1	0	1(1)	0	1	0
38	DF	(England) Axel Tuanzebe	0	0	0	0	0	0	0	0	0	0	0	0
39	FW	(England) Marcus Rashford	11	5	4	1	0	0	3	2	18	8	1	0
40	GK	(Portugal) Joel Castro Pereira	0	0	0	0	0	0	0	0	0	0	0	0
41	DF	(Wales) Regan Poole	0	0	0	0	0	0	0(1)	0	0(1)	0	0	0
42	DF	(England) Tyler Blackett	0	0	0	0	0	0	0	0	0	0	0	0
43	DF	(England) Cameron Borthwick-Jackson	6(4)	0	3	0	0	0	0(1)	0	9(5)	0	0	0
44	MF	(Brazil) Andreas Pereira	0(4)	0	0(2)	0	2	1	0(3)	0	2(9)	1	2	0
45	MF	(England) Sean Goss	0	0	0	0	0	0	0	0	0	0	0	0
46	MF	(England) Joe Rothwell	0	0	0	0	0	0	0	0	0	0	0	0
47	MF	(England) James Weir	0(1)	0	0	0	0	0	0	0	0(1)	0	0	0
48	FW	(England) Will Keane	0(1)	0	0(1)	0	0	0	0	0	0(2)	0	0	0
49	MF	(England) Joe Riley	0	0	0(1)	0	0	0	1	0	1(1)	0	0	0
50	GK	(England) Sam Johnstone	0	0	0	0	0	0	0	0	0	0	0	0
51	DF	(Netherlands) Timothy Fosu-Mensah	2(6)	0	2	0	0	0	0	0	4(6)	0	1	0
52	DF	(England) Ro-Shaun Williams	0	0	0	0	0	0	0	0	0	0	0	0
Own goals			–	3	–	0	–	0	–	2	–	5	–	–

Statistics accurate as of 21 May 2016.

== Transfers ==
=== In ===
Date	Pos.	Name	From	Fee
1 July 2015	FW	(Netherlands) Memphis Depay	(Netherlands) PSV	Undisclosed (Note: Fee reported as £25 million)
11 July 2015	DF	(Italy) Matteo Darmian	(Italy) Torino	Undisclosed (Note: Fee reported as £12.7 million)
13 July 2015	MF	(Germany) Bastian Schweinsteiger	(Germany) Bayern Munich	Undisclosed (Note: Fee reported as £6.5 million)
13 July 2015	MF	(France) Morgan Schneiderlin	(England) Southampton	Undisclosed (Note: Fee reported as £25 million)
27 July 2015	GK	(Argentina) Sergio Romero	Unattached	Free
1 September 2015	FW	(France) Anthony Martial	(France) Monaco	Undisclosed (Note: Fee reported as £36 million)
1 September 2015	DF	(Wales) Regan Poole	(Wales) Newport County	Undisclosed

=== Out ===
Date	Pos.	Name	To	Fee
1 July 2015	GK	(England) Ben Amos	Released	
1 July 2015	MF	(England) Tom Cleverley	(England) Everton	Free
1 July 2015	DF	(England) Callum Evans	Released	
1 July 2015	DF	(Switzerland) Saidy Janko	(Scotland) Celtic	Free
1 July 2015	DF	(Northern Ireland) Jordan Thompson	(Scotland) Rangers	Free
1 July 2015	DF	(Republic of Ireland) Ryan McConnell	Released	
1 July 2015	DF	(England) Tom Thorpe	Released	
6 July 2015	FW	(Chile) Ángelo Henríquez	(Croatia) Dinamo Zagreb	Undisclosed
6 July 2015	MF	(Portugal) Nani	(Turkey) Fenerbahçe	£4.25m
14 July 2015	FW	(Netherlands) Robin van Persie	(Turkey) Fenerbahçe	Undisclosed (Note: Fee reported as £3.84 million)
21 July 2015	DF	(England) Reece James	(England) Wigan Athletic	Undisclosed
3 August 2015	DF	(Brazil) Rafael	(France) Lyon	Undisclosed
6 August 2015	MF	(Argentina) Ángel Di María	(France) Paris Saint-Germain	Undisclosed (Note: Fee reported as £44.3 million)
29 August 2015	DF	(Northern Ireland) Jonny Evans	(England) West Bromwich Albion	Undisclosed (Note: Fee reported as £8 million)
31 August 2015	FW	(Mexico) Javier Hernández	(Germany) Bayer Leverkusen	Undisclosed (Note: Fee reported as £7.3 million)
31 August 2015	GK	(Denmark) Anders Lindegaard	(England) West Bromwich Albion	Free
November 2015	GK	(Serbia) Vanja Milinković-Savić	Released	
11 January 2016	MF	(England) Ben Pearson	(England) Preston North End	Undisclosed
18 January 2016	MF	(England) Liam Grimshaw	(England) Preston North End	Undisclosed

=== Loan out ===
Date from	Date to	Pos.	Name	To
8 July 2015	1 January 2016	FW	(England) Will Keane	(England) Preston North End
18 July 2015	3 January 2016	MF	(England) Ben Pearson	(England) Barnsley
18 July 2015	13 October 2015	MF	(England) Joe Rothwell	(England) Barnsley
29 August 2015	30 June 2016	DF	(England) Tyler Blackett	(Scotland) Celtic
31 August 2015	6 January 2016	MF	(Belgium) Adnan Januzaj	(Germany) Borussia Dortmund
1 September 2015	4 January 2016	MF	(England) Liam Grimshaw	(Scotland) Motherwell
1 September 2015	29 September 2015	GK	(England) Kieran O'Hara	(England) Morecambe
2 October 2015	2 December 2015	DF	(Scotland) Donald Love	(England) Wigan Athletic
19 November 2015	3 January 2016	GK	(Portugal) Joel Castro Pereira	(England) Rochdale
24 November 2015	24 December 2015	GK	(England) Kieran O'Hara	(England) Stockport County
26 November 2015	30 June 2016	FW	(England) James Wilson	(England) Brighton & Hove Albion
31 December 2015	30 June 2016	GK	(England) Sam Johnstone	(England) Preston North End
7 January 2016	30 June 2016	FW	(England) Ashley Fletcher	(England) Barnsley
24 January 2016	29 April 2016	GK	(Spain) Víctor Valdés	(Belgium) Standard Liège
2 February 2016	30 June 2016	MF	(England) Nick Powell	(England) Hull City
