= Dimitrios Theodoridis =

Greek footballer (born 2002)

Dimitris Theodoridis
Personal information
- Full name: Dimitrios Christoforos Theodoridis
- Date of birth: 8 August 2002 (age 24)
- Place of birth: Thessaloniki, Greece
- Height: 1.85 m (6 ft 1 in)
- Position: Striker

Team information
- Current team: A.E. Kifisia
- Number: 9

Youth career
- 2009–2016: PAOK
- 2016–2018: Olympiacos
- 2019–2021: Asteras Tripolis

Senior career*
Years	Team	Apps	(Gls)
2018–2019	AO Kardias		
2021–2022	Panserraikos	5	(0)
2022	Makedonikos		
2022–2023	Keravnos Angelochori	22	(12)
2023	Anagennisi Karditsas		
2023–2024	AO Chaniotis	10	(2)
2024–2025	AEK Athens B	33	(5)
2025	AEK Athens	2	(0)
2025–2026	De Graafschap	19	(2)
2026–	A.E. Kifisia	28	(4)
- * Club domestic league appearances and goals as of 7 November 2026

Dimitrios Theodoridis (Greek: Δημήτριος Θεοδωρίδης; born 8 August 2002) is a Greek professional footballer who plays as a striker for Super League club A.E. Kifisia.

== Career ==
Theodoridis developed through the youth academies of PAOK, Olympiacos, and Asteras Tripolis, before beginning his senior career with AO Kardias. In late March 2021, he signed his first professional contract with Panserraikos, then competing in the Football League, the third tier of Greek football. He made an immediate impact by scoring on his debut in a 3–0 away win against Apollon Pontus a month later. Following a league restructuring at the end of the season, Panserraikos were promoted to the Super League 2. Theodoridis made five appearances at that level before departing the club in February 2022 and returning to amateur football.

On 3 January 2024, he was given a second chance in the professional ranks when top-flight club, AEK Athens signed him for their reserve team, which competed in the second tier. He scored his first goal for AEK B in April 2024 in a match against Makedonikos. During the 2024–25 season, Theodoridis established himself as a regular starter and frequently captained the team. He also made three appearances for the senior side—twice in the league and once in the Greek Cup.

On 14 May 2025, Dutch Eerste Divisie side De Graafschap announced Theodoridis as their first signing for the upcoming season. He signed a two-year contract with an option for an additional two seasons. With the move, he became the third Greek player in the club's history, following Kostas Dedeletakis and Giannis Mystakidis.

On 12 January 2026, Theodoridis returned to Greece and signed a contract for three-and-a-half years with A.E. Kifisia.
