= Javier Ribalta =

Spanish football manager

Personal information
- Date of birth: 14 September 1980 (age 46)
- Place of birth: Barcelona, Spain

Managerial career
- Years: Team
- 2008–2009: Torino (Scout)
- 2009–2011: AC Milan (Scout)
- 2011–2012: Novara (Chief scout)
- 2012–2017: Juventus (Chief scout)
- 2017–2018: Manchester United (Chief scout)
- 2017–2021: Zenit Saint Petersburg (Sporting director)
- 2021–2022: Parma (Managing Director Sport)
- 2022–2023: Olympique de Marseille (Director of Football)
- 2024–: AEK Athens (Director of Football)

Javier Ribalta (born 14 September 1980) is a Spanish football manager who is the Director of Football of AEK Athens.

== Career ==
Ribalta started in 2008 as scout at the Serie A club, Torino. In 2009 he moved to AC Milan, where he stayed for two seasons. In 2011 he got a job as chief scout of Novara, but he left the club at the end of the season, when they were relegated to Serie B. Afterwards Juventus signed him as chief scout, a position he kept for 5 seasons. In 2017 he moved to England, signing at Manchester United as a chief scout. In 2018 he signed with Zenit Saint Petersburg as their sporting director. After 3 years, he moved back to Italy and signed with Parma as a Managing Director Sport. In the following season he moved to France signing with Olympique de Marseille as director of football. In October 2024 he signed as director of football of AEK Athens.
