= Adrià Muñoz =

Spanish footballer

Adrià
Personal information
- Full name: Adrià Muñoz Fernández
- Date of birth: 13 May 1994 (age 32)
- Place of birth: Girona, Spain
- Height: 1.85 m (6 ft 1 in)
- Position: Goalkeeper

Team information
- Current team: Inter d'Escaldes
- Number: 1

Youth career
- 2011–2013: Girona
- 2013–2015: Llagostera

Senior career*
Years	Team	Apps	(Gls)
2013–2015	Llagostera B	42	(0)
2015	Llagostera	1	(0)
2016	Manlleu	2	(0)
2016	Whitehawk	6	(0)
2016–2017	Lewes		
2017–2018	Mulhouse	18	(0)
2018–2019	Cristo Atlético	20	(0)
2019	Lorca	3	(0)
2020–2021	Llagostera B	14	(0)
2021–2022	FC Santa Coloma	22	(0)
2022–	Inter d'Escaldes	42	(0)
- * Club domestic league appearances and goals as of 15 June 2026

Adrià Muñoz Fernández (born 13 May 1994), simply known as Adrià, is a Spanish footballer who plays as a goalkeeper for Inter Club d'Escaldes in Andorra.

== Club career ==
Born in Girona, Catalonia, Adrià finished his graduation with UE Llagostera. He made his debut as a senior with the reserves in 2013, in the regional leagues.

On 7 June 2015, Adrià made his professional debut, coming on as a late substitute for injured José Moragón in a 4–2 away win against Real Valladolid in the Segunda División championship.

In July 2016 Adrià signed for Brighton-based English National League South side Whitehawk, was released in November 2016 but played on a non-contract basis in the FA Trophy against Weymouth the following month when both other first team goalkeepers were unavailable.

On 31 December 2016 he was given his Lewes debut against Three Bridges.
